= 2026 FIFA World Cup squads =

List of squads for men's international team for FIFA World Cup 2026

The 2026 FIFA World Cup was an international football tournament held in Canada, Mexico, and the United States, from June 11 to July 19, 2026. The 48 national teams involved in the tournament were required to register a squad of up to 26 players, including three goalkeepers. Only players in these squads were eligible to take part in the tournament.

A provisional release list of between 35 and 55 players per national team had to be submitted to FIFA by May 11, 2026, one month prior to the opening match of the tournament. The release lists were not made public by FIFA. From the preliminary squad, the final list of at least 23 and at most 26 players (at least three of whom shall be goalkeepers) per national team had to be submitted to FIFA by June 1, ten days prior to the opening match of the tournament. The squad lists were published by FIFA the following day. In the event that a player on the submitted squad list suffered from an injury or illness prior to his team's first match of the tournament, that player could be replaced at any time up to 24 hours before their first match. The team doctor and the FIFA General Medical Officer had to both confirm that the injury or illness was severe enough to prevent the player from participating in the tournament. Replacement players were limited to the preliminary list.

The position listed for each player is per the official squad list published by FIFA. The age listed for each player is as of June 11, 2026, the first day of the tournament. The numbers of caps and goals listed for each player do not include any matches played after the start of the tournament. The club listed is the club for which the player last played a competitive match prior to the tournament. (Note: This is the club a player was last able to play for during the previous season in the event a player did not play a competitive match.) The nationality for each club reflects the national association (not the league) to which the club is affiliated. A flag is included for coaches who are of a different nationality to their team.

== Group A ==
=== Czech Republic ===
Coach: Miroslav Koubek

The Czech Republic announced a 54-man preliminary squad on May 12. The squad was reduced to 29 players on May 21. They announced their final squad on May 31.

No.	Pos.	Player	Date of birth (age)	Caps	Goals	Club
1	GK	Matěj Kovář	17 May 2000 (aged 26)	20	0	(Royal Dutch Football Association) PSV Eindhoven
2	DF	David Zima	8 November 2000 (aged 25)	25	1	(Football Association of the Czech Republic) Slavia Prague
3	DF	Tomáš Holeš	31 March 1993 (aged 33)	41	2	(Football Association of the Czech Republic) Slavia Prague
4	DF	Robin Hranáč	29 January 2000 (aged 26)	14	1	(German Football Association) TSG Hoffenheim
5	DF	Vladimír Coufal	22 August 1992 (aged 33)	62	2	(German Football Association) TSG Hoffenheim
6	DF	Štěpán Chaloupek	8 March 2003 (aged 23)	5	0	(Football Association of the Czech Republic) Slavia Prague
7	DF	Ladislav Krejčí (captain)	20 April 1999 (aged 27)	27	5	(The Football Association) Wolverhampton Wanderers
8	MF	Vladimír Darida	8 August 1990 (aged 35)	79	8	(Football Association of the Czech Republic) Hradec Králové
9	FW	Adam Hložek	25 July 2002 (aged 23)	43	5	(German Football Association) TSG Hoffenheim
10	FW	Patrik Schick	24 January 1996 (aged 30)	53	26	(German Football Association) Bayer Leverkusen
11	FW	Jan Kuchta	8 January 1997 (aged 29)	31	3	(Football Association of the Czech Republic) Sparta Prague
12	MF	Lukáš Červ	10 April 2001 (aged 25)	17	2	(Football Association of the Czech Republic) Viktoria Plzeň
13	FW	Mojmír Chytil	29 April 1999 (aged 27)	22	6	(Football Association of the Czech Republic) Slavia Prague
14	DF	David Jurásek	7 August 2000 (aged 25)	18	1	(Football Association of the Czech Republic) Slavia Prague
15	FW	Pavel Šulc	29 December 2000 (aged 25)	21	5	(French Football Federation) Lyon
16	GK	Jindřich Staněk	27 April 1996 (aged 30)	14	0	(Football Association of the Czech Republic) Slavia Prague
17	MF	Lukáš Provod	23 October 1996 (aged 29)	38	3	(Football Association of the Czech Republic) Slavia Prague
18	MF	Michal Sadílek	31 May 1999 (aged 27)	35	1	(Football Association of the Czech Republic) Slavia Prague
19	FW	Tomáš Chorý	26 January 1995 (aged 31)	22	7	(Football Association of the Czech Republic) Slavia Prague
20	DF	Jaroslav Zelený	20 August 1992 (aged 33)	23	0	(Football Association of the Czech Republic) Sparta Prague
21	DF	David Douděra	31 May 1998 (aged 28)	17	2	(Football Association of the Czech Republic) Slavia Prague
22	MF	Tomáš Souček	27 February 1995 (aged 31)	90	17	(The Football Association) West Ham United
23	GK	Lukáš Horníček	13 July 2002 (aged 23)	1	0	(Portuguese Football Federation) Braga
24	MF	Alexandr Sojka	2 April 2003 (aged 23)	2	0	(Football Association of the Czech Republic) Viktoria Plzeň
25	MF	Hugo Sochůrek	7 June 2008 (aged 18)	1	0	(Football Association of the Czech Republic) Sparta Prague
26	FW	Denis Višinský	21 March 2003 (aged 23)	2	1	(Football Association of the Czech Republic) Viktoria Plzeň

=== Mexico ===
Coach: Javier Aguirre

Mexico announced a 55-man preliminary squad on May 12. The squad was reduced to 51 players on May 23. They announced their final squad on May 31.

No.	Pos.	Player	Date of birth (age)	Caps	Goals	Club
1	GK	Raúl Rangel	25 February 2000 (aged 26)	14	0	(Mexican Football Federation) Guadalajara
2	DF	Jorge Sánchez	10 December 1997 (aged 28)	59	3	(Hellenic Football Federation) PAOK
3	DF	César Montes	24 February 1997 (aged 29)	67	4	(Russian Football Union) Lokomotiv Moscow
4	DF	Edson Álvarez (captain)	24 October 1997 (aged 28)	98	7	(Turkish Football Federation) Fenerbahçe
5	DF	Johan Vásquez	22 October 1998 (aged 27)	46	3	(Italian Football Federation) Genoa
6	MF	Érik Lira	8 May 2000 (aged 26)	25	0	(Mexican Football Federation) Cruz Azul
7	MF	Luis Romo	5 June 1995 (aged 31)	63	4	(Mexican Football Federation) Guadalajara
8	MF	Álvaro Fidalgo	9 April 1997 (aged 29)	4	0	(Royal Spanish Football Federation) Real Betis
9	FW	Raúl Jiménez	5 May 1991 (aged 35)	124	44	(The Football Association) Fulham
10	FW	Alexis Vega	25 November 1997 (aged 28)	52	7	(Mexican Football Federation) Toluca
11	FW	Santiago Giménez	18 April 2001 (aged 25)	47	6	(Italian Football Federation) AC Milan
12	GK	Carlos Acevedo	19 April 1996 (aged 30)	7	0	(Mexican Football Federation) Santos Laguna
13	GK	Guillermo Ochoa	13 July 1985 (aged 40)	152	0	(Cyprus Football Association) AEL Limassol
14	FW	Armando González	20 April 2003 (aged 23)	7	1	(Mexican Football Federation) Guadalajara
15	DF	Israel Reyes	23 May 2000 (aged 26)	34	2	(Mexican Football Federation) América
16	FW	Julián Quiñones	24 March 1997 (aged 29)	22	2	(Saudi Arabian Football Federation) Al-Qadsiah
17	MF	Orbelín Pineda	24 March 1996 (aged 30)	92	12	(Hellenic Football Federation) AEK Athens
18	MF	Obed Vargas	5 August 2005 (aged 20)	6	0	(Royal Spanish Football Federation) Atlético Madrid
19	MF	Gilberto Mora	14 October 2008 (aged 17)	8	0	(Mexican Football Federation) Tijuana
20	DF	Mateo Chávez	12 May 2004 (aged 22)	10	0	(Royal Dutch Football Association) AZ
21	FW	César Huerta	3 December 2000 (aged 25)	26	3	(Royal Belgian Football Association) Anderlecht
22	FW	Guillermo Martínez	15 March 1995 (aged 31)	12	3	(Mexican Football Federation) Pumas UNAM
23	DF	Jesús Gallardo	15 August 1994 (aged 31)	121	3	(Mexican Football Federation) Toluca
24	MF	Luis Chávez	15 January 1996 (aged 30)	45	5	(Russian Football Union) Dynamo Moscow
25	FW	Roberto Alvarado	7 September 1998 (aged 27)	67	5	(Mexican Football Federation) Guadalajara
26	MF	Brian Gutiérrez	17 June 2003 (aged 22)	7	2	(Mexican Football Federation) Guadalajara

=== South Africa ===
Coach: (Belgium) Hugo Broos

South Africa announced a 32-man preliminary squad on May 21. They announced their final squad on May 27.

No.	Pos.	Player	Date of birth (age)	Caps	Goals	Club
1	GK	Ronwen Williams (captain)	21 January 1992 (aged 34)	62	0	(South African Football Association) Mamelodi Sundowns
2	DF	Thabang Matuludi	14 January 1999 (aged 27)	3	0	(South African Football Association) Polokwane City
3	DF	Khulumani Ndamane	5 February 2004 (aged 22)	5	0	(South African Football Association) Mamelodi Sundowns
4	MF	Teboho Mokoena	24 January 1997 (aged 29)	51	9	(South African Football Association) Mamelodi Sundowns
5	MF	Thalente Mbatha	6 March 2000 (aged 26)	15	3	(South African Football Association) Orlando Pirates
6	DF	Aubrey Modiba	22 July 1995 (aged 30)	44	3	(South African Football Association) Mamelodi Sundowns
7	FW	Oswin Appollis	25 August 2001 (aged 24)	26	8	(South African Football Association) Orlando Pirates
8	FW	Tshepang Moremi	2 October 2000 (aged 25)	10	1	(South African Football Association) Orlando Pirates
9	FW	Lyle Foster	3 September 2000 (aged 25)	27	10	(The Football Association) Burnley
10	FW	Relebohile Mofokeng	23 October 2004 (aged 21)	13	1	(South African Football Association) Orlando Pirates
11	MF	Themba Zwane	3 August 1989 (aged 36)	54	12	(South African Football Association) Mamelodi Sundowns
12	FW	Thapelo Maseko	11 November 2003 (aged 22)	10	1	(Cyprus Football Association) AEL Limassol
13	MF	Sphephelo Sithole	3 March 1999 (aged 27)	28	1	(Portuguese Football Federation) Tondela
14	DF	Mbekezeli Mbokazi	19 September 2005 (aged 20)	10	1	(United States Soccer Federation) Chicago Fire FC
15	FW	Iqraam Rayners	19 December 1995 (aged 30)	14	4	(South African Football Association) Mamelodi Sundowns
16	GK	Sipho Chaine	14 December 1996 (aged 29)	4	0	(South African Football Association) Orlando Pirates
17	FW	Evidence Makgopa	5 June 2000 (aged 26)	26	6	(South African Football Association) Orlando Pirates
18	DF	Samukele Kabini	15 March 2004 (aged 22)	6	0	(Norwegian Football Federation) Molde
19	DF	Nkosinathi Sibisi	22 September 1995 (aged 30)	20	0	(South African Football Association) Orlando Pirates
20	DF	Khuliso Mudau	26 April 1995 (aged 31)	32	1	(South African Football Association) Mamelodi Sundowns
21	DF	Ime Okon	20 February 2004 (aged 22)	8	1	(German Football Association) Hannover 96
22	GK	Ricardo Goss	2 April 1994 (aged 32)	5	0	(South African Football Association) Siwelele
23	MF	Jayden Adams	5 May 2001 (aged 25)	9	1	(South African Football Association) Mamelodi Sundowns
24	DF	Olwethu Makhanya	30 April 2004 (aged 22)	1	0	(United States Soccer Federation) Philadelphia Union
25	FW	Kamogelo Sebelebele	21 July 2002 (aged 23)	3	0	(South African Football Association) Orlando Pirates
26	DF	Bradley Cross	30 January 2001 (aged 25)	1	0	(South African Football Association) Kaizer Chiefs

=== South Korea ===
Coach: Hong Myung-bo

South Korea announced their final squad on May 16. Cho Yu-min withdrew injured and was replaced by Cho Wi-je on May 31.

No.	Pos.	Player	Date of birth (age)	Caps	Goals	Club
1	GK	Kim Seung-gyu	30 September 1990 (aged 35)	87	0	(Japan Football Association) FC Tokyo
2	DF	Lee Han-beom	17 June 2002 (aged 23)	8	0	(Danish Football Association) Midtjylland
3	MF	Lee Gi-hyuk	7 July 2000 (aged 25)	3	0	(Korea Football Association) Gangwon FC
4	DF	Kim Min-jae	15 November 1996 (aged 29)	79	4	(German Football Association) Bayern Munich
5	DF	Kim Tae-hyeon	17 September 2000 (aged 25)	7	0	(Japan Football Association) Kashima Antlers
6	MF	Hwang In-beom	20 September 1996 (aged 29)	73	6	(Royal Dutch Football Association) Feyenoord
7	FW	Son Heung-min (captain)	8 July 1992 (aged 33)	144	56	(United States Soccer Federation) Los Angeles FC
8	MF	Paik Seung-ho	17 March 1997 (aged 29)	27	3	(The Football Association) Birmingham City
9	FW	Cho Gue-sung	25 January 1998 (aged 28)	44	12	(Danish Football Association) Midtjylland
10	MF	Lee Jae-sung	10 August 1992 (aged 33)	105	15	(German Football Association) Mainz 05
11	MF	Hwang Hee-chan	26 January 1996 (aged 30)	79	17	(The Football Association) Wolverhampton Wanderers
12	GK	Song Bum-keun	15 October 1997 (aged 28)	3	0	(Korea Football Association) Jeonbuk Hyundai Motors
13	DF	Lee Tae-seok	28 July 2002 (aged 23)	15	1	(Austrian Football Association) Austria Wien
14	DF	Cho Wi-je	25 August 2001 (aged 24)	1	0	(Korea Football Association) Jeonbuk Hyundai Motors
15	DF	Kim Moon-hwan	1 August 1995 (aged 30)	35	0	(Korea Football Association) Daejeon Hana Citizen
16	DF	Park Jin-seob	23 October 1995 (aged 30)	14	1	(Chinese Football Association) Zhejiang
17	MF	Bae Jun-ho	21 August 2003 (aged 22)	13	2	(The Football Association) Stoke City
18	FW	Oh Hyeon-gyu	12 April 2001 (aged 25)	27	6	(Turkish Football Federation) Beşiktaş
19	MF	Lee Kang-in	19 February 2001 (aged 25)	47	11	(French Football Federation) Paris Saint-Germain
20	MF	Yang Hyun-jun	25 May 2002 (aged 24)	9	0	(Scottish Football Association) Celtic
21	GK	Jo Hyeon-woo	25 September 1991 (aged 34)	48	0	(Korea Football Association) Ulsan HD
22	DF	Seol Young-woo	5 December 1998 (aged 27)	34	0	(Football Association of Serbia) Red Star Belgrade
23	DF	Jens Castrop	29 July 2003 (aged 22)	7	0	(German Football Association) Borussia Mönchengladbach
24	MF	Kim Jin-gyu	24 February 1997 (aged 29)	22	3	(Korea Football Association) Jeonbuk Hyundai Motors
25	MF	Eom Ji-sung	9 May 2002 (aged 24)	9	2	(Football Association of Wales) Swansea City
26	MF	Lee Dong-gyeong	20 September 1997 (aged 28)	18	4	(Korea Football Association) Ulsan HD

== Group B ==
=== Bosnia and Herzegovina ===
Coach: Sergej Barbarez

Bosnia and Herzegovina announced their final squad on May 11. Osman Hadžikić withdrew injured and was replaced by Mladen Jurkas on June 1. Nidal Čelik withdrew injured and was replaced by Arjan Malić on June 11.

No.	Pos.	Player	Date of birth (age)	Caps	Goals	Club
1	GK	Nikola Vasilj	2 December 1995 (aged 30)	26	0	(German Football Association) FC St. Pauli
2	DF	Nihad Mujakić	15 April 1998 (aged 28)	12	1	(Turkish Football Federation) Gaziantep
3	DF	Dennis Hadžikadunić	9 July 1998 (aged 27)	32	0	(Italian Football Federation) Sampdoria
4	DF	Tarik Muharemović	28 February 2003 (aged 23)	14	1	(Italian Football Federation) Sassuolo
5	DF	Sead Kolašinac	20 June 1993 (aged 32)	65	0	(Italian Football Federation) Atalanta
6	MF	Benjamin Tahirović	3 March 2003 (aged 23)	28	2	(Danish Football Association) Brøndby
7	DF	Amar Dedić	18 August 2002 (aged 23)	28	1	(Portuguese Football Federation) Benfica
8	MF	Armin Gigović	6 April 2002 (aged 24)	20	1	(Swiss Football Association) Young Boys
9	FW	Samed Baždar	31 January 2004 (aged 22)	13	1	(Polish Football Association) Jagiellonia Białystok
10	FW	Ermedin Demirović	25 March 1998 (aged 28)	40	4	(German Football Association) VfB Stuttgart
11	FW	Edin Džeko (captain)	17 March 1986 (aged 40)	148	73	(German Football Association) Schalke 04
12	GK	Mladen Jurkas	7 October 2007 (aged 18)	0	0	(Football Association of Bosnia and Herzegovina) Borac Banja Luka
13	MF	Ivan Bašić	30 April 2002 (aged 24)	17	0	(Kazakhstan Football Federation) Astana
14	MF	Ivan Šunjić	9 October 1996 (aged 29)	11	0	(Cyprus Football Association) Pafos
15	MF	Amar Memić	20 January 2001 (aged 25)	13	1	(Football Association of the Czech Republic) Viktoria Plzeň
16	MF	Amir Hadžiahmetović	8 March 1997 (aged 29)	36	0	(The Football Association) Hull City
17	MF	Dženis Burnić	22 May 1998 (aged 28)	20	0	(German Football Association) Karlsruher SC
18	DF	Nikola Katić	10 October 1996 (aged 29)	17	2	(German Football Association) Schalke 04
19	FW	Kerim Alajbegović	21 September 2007 (aged 18)	10	1	(Austrian Football Association) Red Bull Salzburg
20	FW	Esmir Bajraktarević	10 March 2005 (aged 21)	16	1	(Royal Dutch Football Association) PSV Eindhoven
21	DF	Stjepan Radeljić	5 September 1997 (aged 28)	5	0	(Croatian Football Federation) Rijeka
22	GK	Martin Zlomislić	16 August 1998 (aged 27)	3	0	(Croatian Football Federation) Rijeka
23	FW	Haris Tabaković	20 June 1994 (aged 31)	10	4	(German Football Association) Borussia Mönchengladbach
24	DF	Arjan Malić	28 August 2005 (aged 20)	8	0	(Austrian Football Association) Sturm Graz
25	FW	Jovo Lukić	28 November 1998 (aged 27)	3	0	(Romanian Football Federation) Universitatea Cluj
26	MF	Ermin Mahmić	14 March 2005 (aged 21)	2	0	(Football Association of the Czech Republic) Slovan Liberec

=== Canada ===
Coach: (United States) Jesse Marsch

Canada announced a 32-man preliminary squad on May 25. They announced their final squad on May 29. Marcelo Flores withdrew injured on May 31 and was replaced by Jayden Nelson on June 9.

No.	Pos.	Player	Date of birth (age)	Caps	Goals	Club
1	GK	Dayne St. Clair	9 May 1997 (aged 29)	20	0	(United States Soccer Federation) Inter Miami CF
2	DF	Alistair Johnston	8 October 1998 (aged 27)	58	1	(Scottish Football Association) Celtic
3	DF	Alfie Jones	7 October 1997 (aged 28)	2	0	(The Football Association) Middlesbrough
4	DF	Luc de Fougerolles	12 October 2005 (aged 20)	13	0	(Royal Belgian Football Association) Dender EH
5	DF	Joel Waterman	24 January 1996 (aged 30)	17	0	(United States Soccer Federation) Chicago Fire FC
6	MF	Mathieu Choinière	7 February 1999 (aged 27)	23	0	(United States Soccer Federation) Los Angeles FC
7	MF	Stephen Eustáquio	21 December 1996 (aged 29)	56	4	(United States Soccer Federation) Los Angeles FC
8	MF	Ismaël Koné	16 June 2002 (aged 23)	40	4	(Italian Football Federation) Sassuolo
9	FW	Cyle Larin	17 April 1995 (aged 31)	90	30	(The Football Association) Southampton
10	FW	Jonathan David	14 January 2000 (aged 26)	77	39	(Italian Football Federation) Juventus
11	MF	Liam Millar	27 September 1999 (aged 26)	41	1	(The Football Association) Hull City
12	FW	Tani Oluwaseyi	15 May 2000 (aged 26)	24	2	(Royal Spanish Football Federation) Villarreal
13	DF	Derek Cornelius	25 November 1997 (aged 28)	44	1	(Scottish Football Association) Rangers
14	MF	Jacob Shaffelburg	26 November 1999 (aged 26)	31	6	(United States Soccer Federation) Los Angeles FC
15	DF	Moïse Bombito	30 March 2000 (aged 26)	20	0	(French Football Federation) Nice
16	GK	Maxime Crépeau	11 May 1994 (aged 32)	32	0	(United States Soccer Federation) Orlando City SC
17	FW	Tajon Buchanan	8 February 1999 (aged 27)	60	8	(Royal Spanish Football Federation) Villarreal
18	GK	Owen Goodman	27 November 2003 (aged 22)	0	0	(The Football Association) Barnsley
19	DF	Alphonso Davies (captain)	2 November 2000 (aged 25)	58	15	(German Football Association) Bayern Munich
20	FW	Ali Ahmed	10 October 2000 (aged 25)	24	1	(The Football Association) Norwich City
21	MF	Jonathan Osorio	12 June 1992 (aged 33)	90	10	(Canadian Soccer Association) Toronto FC
22	DF	Richie Laryea	7 January 1995 (aged 31)	75	1	(Canadian Soccer Association) Toronto FC
23	DF	Niko Sigur	9 September 2003 (aged 22)	19	2	(Croatian Football Federation) Hajduk Split
24	FW	Promise David	3 July 2001 (aged 24)	10	3	(Royal Belgian Football Association) Union Saint-Gilloise
25	MF	Nathan Saliba	7 February 2004 (aged 22)	15	2	(Royal Belgian Football Association) Anderlecht
26	FW	Jayden Nelson	26 September 2002 (aged 23)	14	3	(United States Soccer Federation) Austin FC

=== Qatar ===
Coach: (Spain) Julen Lopetegui

Qatar announced a 34-man preliminary squad on May 12. The squad was extended to 35 players on May 18, then reduced to 28 players on May 25. They announced their final squad on June 1.

No.	Pos.	Player	Date of birth (age)	Caps	Goals	Club
1	GK	Mahmud Abunada	5 February 2000 (aged 26)	6	0	(Qatar Football Association) Al-Rayyan
2	DF	Pedro Miguel	6 August 1990 (aged 35)	105	3	(Qatar Football Association) Al-Sadd
3	DF	Lucas Mendes	3 July 1990 (aged 35)	25	1	(Qatar Football Association) Al-Wakrah
4	DF	Issa Laye	22 December 1997 (aged 28)	4	0	(Qatar Football Association) Al-Arabi
5	DF	Jassem Gaber	20 February 2002 (aged 24)	32	1	(Qatar Football Association) Al-Rayyan
6	MF	Abdulaziz Hatem	1 January 1990 (aged 36)	119	11	(Qatar Football Association) Al-Rayyan
7	FW	Ahmed Alaaeldin	31 January 1993 (aged 33)	68	9	(Qatar Football Association) Al-Rayyan
8	FW	Edmilson Junior	19 August 1994 (aged 31)	16	0	(Qatar Football Association) Al-Duhail
9	FW	Mohammed Muntari	20 December 1993 (aged 32)	67	16	(Qatar Football Association) Al-Gharafa
10	FW	Hassan Al-Haydos (captain)	11 December 1990 (aged 35)	186	41	(Qatar Football Association) Al-Sadd
11	FW	Akram Afif	18 November 1996 (aged 29)	125	39	(Qatar Football Association) Al-Sadd
12	MF	Karim Boudiaf	16 September 1990 (aged 35)	118	5	(Qatar Football Association) Al-Duhail
13	DF	Ayoub Al-Oui	11 March 2005 (aged 21)	6	0	(Qatar Football Association) Al-Gharafa
14	DF	Homam Ahmed	25 August 1999 (aged 26)	68	3	(Royal Spanish Football Federation) Cultural Leonesa
15	FW	Yusuf Abdurisag	6 August 1999 (aged 26)	39	3	(Qatar Football Association) Al-Wakrah
16	DF	Boualem Khoukhi	9 July 1990 (aged 35)	116	20	(Qatar Football Association) Al-Sadd
17	MF	Ahmed Al-Ganehi	22 September 2000 (aged 25)	13	1	(Qatar Football Association) Al-Gharafa
18	DF	Sultan Al-Brake	7 April 1996 (aged 30)	17	0	(Qatar Football Association) Al-Duhail
19	FW	Almoez Ali	19 August 1996 (aged 29)	115	55	(Qatar Football Association) Al-Duhail
20	MF	Ahmed Fathy	25 January 1993 (aged 33)	48	0	(Qatar Football Association) Al-Arabi
21	GK	Salah Zakaria	24 April 1999 (aged 27)	8	0	(Qatar Football Association) Al-Duhail
22	GK	Meshaal Barsham	14 February 1998 (aged 28)	52	0	(Qatar Football Association) Al-Sadd
23	MF	Assim Madibo	22 October 1996 (aged 29)	51	0	(Qatar Football Association) Al-Wakrah
24	FW	Tahsin Jamshid	16 June 2006 (aged 19)	3	0	(Qatar Football Association) Al-Duhail
25	DF	Al-Hashmi Al-Hussain	15 August 2003 (aged 22)	8	0	(Qatar Football Association) Al-Arabi
26	FW	Mohamed Manai	25 October 2002 (aged 23)	10	0	(Qatar Football Association) Al-Shamal

=== Switzerland ===
Coach: Murat Yakin

Switzerland announced their final squad through a social media campaign on May 18 and 19, which was officially confirmed on May 20.

No.	Pos.	Player	Date of birth (age)	Caps	Goals	Club
1	GK	Gregor Kobel	6 December 1997 (aged 28)	21	0	(German Football Association) Borussia Dortmund
2	DF	Miro Muheim	24 March 1998 (aged 28)	10	0	(German Football Association) Hamburger SV
3	DF	Silvan Widmer	5 March 1993 (aged 33)	60	5	(German Football Association) Mainz 05
4	DF	Nico Elvedi	30 September 1996 (aged 29)	67	3	(German Football Association) Borussia Mönchengladbach
5	DF	Manuel Akanji	19 July 1995 (aged 30)	81	4	(Italian Football Federation) Inter Milan
6	MF	Denis Zakaria	20 November 1996 (aged 29)	65	3	(French Football Federation) Monaco
7	FW	Breel Embolo	14 February 1997 (aged 29)	86	24	(French Football Federation) Rennes
8	MF	Remo Freuler	15 April 1992 (aged 34)	88	11	(Italian Football Federation) Bologna
9	MF	Johan Manzambi	14 October 2005 (aged 20)	12	3	(German Football Association) SC Freiburg
10	MF	Granit Xhaka (captain)	27 September 1992 (aged 33)	146	17	(The Football Association) Sunderland
11	FW	Dan Ndoye	25 October 2000 (aged 25)	31	8	(The Football Association) Nottingham Forest
12	GK	Yvon Mvogo	6 June 1994 (aged 32)	13	0	(French Football Federation) Lorient
13	DF	Ricardo Rodriguez	25 August 1992 (aged 33)	138	9	(Royal Spanish Football Federation) Real Betis
14	MF	Ardon Jashari	30 July 2002 (aged 23)	8	0	(Italian Football Federation) AC Milan
15	MF	Djibril Sow	6 February 1997 (aged 29)	52	0	(Royal Spanish Football Federation) Sevilla
16	FW	Christian Fassnacht	11 November 1993 (aged 32)	23	5	(Swiss Football Association) Young Boys
17	FW	Rubén Vargas	5 August 1998 (aged 27)	61	11	(Royal Spanish Football Federation) Sevilla
18	DF	Eray Cömert	4 February 1998 (aged 28)	22	0	(Royal Spanish Football Federation) Valencia
19	FW	Noah Okafor	24 May 2000 (aged 26)	25	2	(The Football Association) Leeds United
20	MF	Michel Aebischer	6 January 1997 (aged 29)	40	2	(Italian Football Federation) Pisa
21	GK	Marvin Keller	3 July 2002 (aged 23)	1	0	(Swiss Football Association) Young Boys
22	MF	Fabian Rieder	16 February 2002 (aged 24)	28	1	(German Football Association) FC Augsburg
23	FW	Zeki Amdouni	4 December 2000 (aged 25)	29	11	(The Football Association) Burnley
24	DF	Aurèle Amenda	31 July 2003 (aged 22)	7	0	(German Football Association) Eintracht Frankfurt
25	DF	Luca Jaquez	2 June 2003 (aged 23)	3	0	(German Football Association) VfB Stuttgart
26	FW	Cedric Itten	27 December 1996 (aged 29)	15	5	(German Football Association) Fortuna Düsseldorf

== Group C ==
=== Brazil ===
Coach: (Italy) Carlo Ancelotti

Brazil announced a 55-man preliminary squad on May 12. They announced their final squad on May 18. Wesley withdrew injured and was replaced by Éderson Silva on June 7.

No.	Pos.	Player	Date of birth (age)	Caps	Goals	Club
1	GK	Alisson	2 October 1992 (aged 33)	78	0	(The Football Association) Liverpool
2	MF	Éderson Silva	7 July 1999 (aged 26)	3	0	(Italian Football Federation) Atalanta
3	DF	Gabriel Magalhães	19 December 1997 (aged 28)	17	1	(The Football Association) Arsenal
4	DF	Marquinhos (captain)	14 May 1994 (aged 32)	105	7	(French Football Federation) Paris Saint-Germain
5	MF	Casemiro	23 February 1992 (aged 34)	86	9	(The Football Association) Manchester United
6	DF	Alex Sandro	26 January 1991 (aged 35)	45	2	(Brazilian Football Confederation) Flamengo
7	FW	Vinícius Júnior	12 July 2000 (aged 25)	49	9	(Royal Spanish Football Federation) Real Madrid
8	MF	Bruno Guimarães	16 November 1997 (aged 28)	43	3	(The Football Association) Newcastle United
9	FW	Matheus Cunha	27 May 1999 (aged 27)	23	1	(The Football Association) Manchester United
10	FW	Neymar	5 February 1992 (aged 34)	128	79	(Brazilian Football Confederation) Santos
11	FW	Raphinha	14 December 1996 (aged 29)	39	11	(Royal Spanish Football Federation) Barcelona
12	GK	Weverton	13 December 1987 (aged 38)	11	0	(Brazilian Football Confederation) Grêmio
13	DF	Danilo Luiz	15 July 1991 (aged 34)	70	1	(Brazilian Football Confederation) Flamengo
14	DF	Bremer	18 March 1997 (aged 29)	8	1	(Italian Football Federation) Juventus
15	DF	Léo Pereira	31 January 1996 (aged 30)	4	0	(Brazilian Football Confederation) Flamengo
16	DF	Douglas Santos	22 March 1994 (aged 32)	7	0	(Russian Football Union) Zenit Saint Petersburg
17	MF	Fabinho	23 October 1993 (aged 32)	33	0	(Saudi Arabian Football Federation) Al-Ittihad
18	MF	Danilo Santos	29 April 2001 (aged 25)	4	2	(Brazilian Football Confederation) Botafogo
19	FW	Endrick	21 July 2006 (aged 19)	17	4	(French Football Federation) Lyon
20	MF	Lucas Paquetá	27 August 1997 (aged 28)	63	13	(Brazilian Football Confederation) Flamengo
21	FW	Luiz Henrique	2 January 2001 (aged 25)	15	2	(Russian Football Union) Zenit Saint Petersburg
22	FW	Gabriel Martinelli	18 June 2001 (aged 24)	23	4	(The Football Association) Arsenal
23	GK	Ederson Moraes	17 August 1993 (aged 32)	32	0	(Turkish Football Federation) Fenerbahçe
24	DF	Roger Ibañez	23 November 1998 (aged 27)	7	0	(Saudi Arabian Football Federation) Al-Ahli
25	FW	Igor Thiago	26 June 2001 (aged 24)	4	2	(The Football Association) Brentford
26	FW	Rayan	3 August 2006 (aged 19)	2	1	(The Football Association) Bournemouth

=== Haiti ===
Coach: (France) Sébastien Migné

Haiti announced their final squad on May 15. Leverton Pierre withdrew injured and was replaced by Garven Metusala on June 11.

No.	Pos.	Player	Date of birth (age)	Caps	Goals	Club
1	GK	Johny Placide (captain)	29 January 1988 (aged 38)	82	0	(French Football Federation) Bastia
2	DF	Carlens Arcus	28 June 1996 (aged 29)	56	1	(French Football Federation) Angers
3	DF	Keeto Thermoncy	29 March 2006 (aged 20)	1	0	(Swiss Football Association) Young Boys
4	DF	Ricardo Adé	21 May 1990 (aged 36)	59	2	(Ecuadorian Football Federation) LDU Quito
5	DF	Hannes Delcroix	28 February 1999 (aged 27)	7	0	(Swiss Football Association) Lugano
6	MF	Carl Sainté	9 August 2002 (aged 23)	26	0	(United States Soccer Federation) El Paso Locomotive FC
7	FW	Derrick Etienne Jr.	25 November 1996 (aged 29)	51	8	(Canadian Soccer Association) Toronto FC
8	DF	Martin Expérience	9 March 1999 (aged 27)	21	0	(French Football Federation) Nancy
9	FW	Duckens Nazon	7 April 1994 (aged 32)	82	44	(Football Federation Islamic Republic of Iran) Esteghlal
10	MF	Jean-Ricner Bellegarde	27 June 1998 (aged 27)	10	0	(The Football Association) Wolverhampton Wanderers
11	FW	Louicius Deedson	11 February 2001 (aged 25)	32	10	(United States Soccer Federation) FC Dallas
12	GK	Alexandre Pierre	25 February 2001 (aged 25)	16	0	(French Football Federation) Sochaux
13	DF	Duke Lacroix	14 October 1993 (aged 32)	16	3	(United States Soccer Federation) Colorado Springs Switchbacks FC
14	DF	Garven Metusala	31 December 1999 (aged 26)	16	0	(United States Soccer Federation) Colorado Springs Switchbacks FC
15	FW	Ruben Providence	7 July 2001 (aged 24)	15	3	(Royal Dutch Football Association) Almere City
16	FW	Lenny Joseph	12 October 2000 (aged 25)	2	1	(Hungarian Football Federation) Ferencváros
17	MF	Danley Jean Jacques	20 May 2000 (aged 26)	31	6	(United States Soccer Federation) Philadelphia Union
18	FW	Wilson Isidor	27 August 2000 (aged 25)	4	2	(The Football Association) Sunderland
19	FW	Yassin Fortuné	30 January 1999 (aged 27)	4	0	(Portuguese Football Federation) Vizela
20	FW	Frantzdy Pierrot	29 March 1995 (aged 31)	51	34	(Turkish Football Federation) Çaykur Rizespor
21	FW	Josué Casimir	24 September 2001 (aged 24)	7	0	(French Football Federation) Auxerre
22	DF	Jean-Kévin Duverne	12 July 1997 (aged 28)	17	1	(Royal Belgian Football Association) Gent
23	GK	Josué Duverger	27 April 2000 (aged 26)	7	0	(German Football Association) Cosmos Koblenz
24	DF	Wilguens Paugain	24 August 2001 (aged 24)	8	0	(Royal Belgian Football Association) Zulte Waregem
25	MF	Dominique Simon	29 July 2000 (aged 25)	2	0	(Slovak Football Association) Tatran Prešov
26	MF	Woodensky Pierre	30 December 2004 (aged 21)	1	0	(Haitian Football Federation) Violette

=== Morocco ===
Coach: Mohamed Ouahbi

Morocco announced their final squad on May 26. Abde Ezzalzouli and Nayef Aguerd withdrew injured and were replaced by Amine Sbaï and Marwane Saâdane on June 10, respectively.

No.	Pos.	Player	Date of birth (age)	Caps	Goals	Club
1	GK	Yassine Bounou	5 April 1991 (aged 35)	90	0	(Saudi Arabian Football Federation) Al-Hilal
2	DF	Achraf Hakimi (captain)	4 November 1998 (aged 27)	96	11	(French Football Federation) Paris Saint-Germain
3	DF	Noussair Mazraoui	14 November 1997 (aged 28)	45	2	(The Football Association) Manchester United
4	MF	Sofyan Amrabat	21 August 1996 (aged 29)	75	0	(Royal Spanish Football Federation) Real Betis
5	DF	Marwane Saâdane	17 January 1992 (aged 34)	8	0	(Saudi Arabian Football Federation) Al-Fateh
6	MF	Ayyoub Bouaddi	2 October 2007 (aged 18)	3	0	(French Football Federation) Lille
7	MF	Chemsdine Talbi	9 May 2005 (aged 21)	5	0	(The Football Association) Sunderland
8	MF	Azzedine Ounahi	19 April 2000 (aged 26)	49	9	(Royal Spanish Football Federation) Girona
9	FW	Soufiane Rahimi	2 June 1996 (aged 30)	37	12	(United Arab Emirates Football Association) Al Ain
10	FW	Brahim Díaz	3 August 1999 (aged 26)	26	14	(Royal Spanish Football Federation) Real Madrid
11	MF	Ismael Saibari	28 January 2001 (aged 25)	30	9	(Royal Dutch Football Association) PSV Eindhoven
12	GK	Munir Mohamedi	10 May 1989 (aged 37)	52	0	(Royal Moroccan Football Federation) RS Berkane
13	DF	Zakaria El Ouahdi	31 December 2001 (aged 24)	3	0	(Royal Belgian Football Association) Genk
14	DF	Issa Diop	9 January 1997 (aged 29)	4	0	(The Football Association) Fulham
15	MF	Samir El Mourabet	6 October 2005 (aged 20)	4	0	(French Football Federation) Strasbourg
16	MF	Gessime Yassine	22 November 2005 (aged 20)	4	0	(French Football Federation) Strasbourg
17	FW	Amine Sbaï	5 November 2000 (aged 25)	2	0	(French Football Federation) Angers
18	DF	Chadi Riad	17 June 2003 (aged 22)	6	1	(The Football Association) Crystal Palace
19	DF	Youssef Belammari	20 September 1998 (aged 27)	18	0	(Egyptian Football Association) Al Ahly
20	FW	Ayoub El Kaabi	25 June 1993 (aged 32)	71	35	(Hellenic Football Federation) Olympiacos
21	FW	Ayoube Amaimouni	30 November 2004 (aged 21)	2	0	(German Football Association) Eintracht Frankfurt
22	GK	Ahmed Reda Tagnaouti	5 April 1996 (aged 30)	3	0	(Royal Moroccan Football Federation) AS FAR
23	MF	Bilal El Khannouss	10 May 2004 (aged 22)	37	3	(German Football Association) VfB Stuttgart
24	MF	Neil El Aynaoui	2 July 2001 (aged 24)	16	2	(Italian Football Federation) Roma
25	DF	Redouane Halhal	5 March 2003 (aged 23)	3	0	(Royal Belgian Football Association) Mechelen
26	DF	Anass Salah-Eddine	18 January 2002 (aged 24)	9	0	(Royal Dutch Football Association) PSV Eindhoven

=== Scotland ===
Coach: Steve Clarke

Scotland announced their final squad on May 19. Billy Gilmour withdrew injured on May 30, and was replaced by Tyler Fletcher on May 31.

No.	Pos.	Player	Date of birth (age)	Caps	Goals	Club
1	GK	Angus Gunn	22 January 1996 (aged 30)	22	0	(The Football Association) Nottingham Forest
2	DF	Aaron Hickey	10 June 2002 (aged 24)	21	0	(The Football Association) Brentford
3	DF	Andy Robertson (captain)	11 March 1994 (aged 32)	94	4	(The Football Association) Liverpool
4	MF	Scott McTominay	8 December 1996 (aged 29)	70	15	(Italian Football Federation) Napoli
5	DF	Grant Hanley	20 November 1991 (aged 34)	68	2	(Scottish Football Association) Hibernian
6	DF	Kieran Tierney	5 June 1997 (aged 29)	56	2	(Scottish Football Association) Celtic
7	MF	John McGinn	18 October 1994 (aged 31)	86	20	(The Football Association) Aston Villa
8	MF	Tyler Fletcher	19 March 2007 (aged 19)	2	0	(The Football Association) Manchester United
9	FW	Lyndon Dykes	7 October 1995 (aged 30)	51	10	(The Football Association) Charlton Athletic
10	FW	Ché Adams	13 July 1996 (aged 29)	47	13	(Italian Football Federation) Torino
11	MF	Ryan Christie	22 February 1995 (aged 31)	68	10	(The Football Association) Bournemouth
12	GK	Liam Kelly	23 January 1996 (aged 30)	3	0	(Scottish Football Association) Rangers
13	DF	Jack Hendry	7 May 1995 (aged 31)	38	3	(Saudi Arabian Football Federation) Al-Ettifaq
14	FW	Ross Stewart	11 July 1996 (aged 29)	3	0	(The Football Association) Southampton
15	DF	John Souttar	25 September 1996 (aged 29)	24	2	(Scottish Football Association) Rangers
16	DF	Dominic Hyam	20 December 1995 (aged 30)	4	0	(Football Association of Wales) Wrexham
17	FW	Ben Gannon-Doak	11 November 2005 (aged 20)	14	1	(The Football Association) Bournemouth
18	FW	George Hirst	15 February 1999 (aged 27)	10	1	(The Football Association) Ipswich Town
19	MF	Lewis Ferguson	24 August 1999 (aged 26)	24	1	(Italian Football Federation) Bologna
20	FW	Lawrence Shankland	10 August 1995 (aged 30)	20	7	(Scottish Football Association) Heart of Midlothian
21	GK	Craig Gordon	31 December 1982 (aged 43)	84	0	(Scottish Football Association) Heart of Midlothian
22	DF	Nathan Patterson	16 October 2001 (aged 24)	26	1	(The Football Association) Everton
23	MF	Kenny McLean	8 January 1992 (aged 34)	58	3	(The Football Association) Norwich City
24	DF	Anthony Ralston	16 November 1998 (aged 27)	27	1	(Scottish Football Association) Celtic
25	FW	Findlay Curtis	9 June 2006 (aged 20)	3	1	(Scottish Football Association) Kilmarnock
26	DF	Scott McKenna	12 November 1996 (aged 29)	50	1	(Croatian Football Federation) Dinamo Zagreb

== Group D ==
=== Australia ===
Coach: Tony Popovic

Australia announced their final squad on May 31.

No.	Pos.	Player	Date of birth (age)	Caps	Goals	Club
1	GK	Mathew Ryan (captain)	8 April 1992 (aged 34)	104	0	(Royal Spanish Football Federation) Levante
2	DF	Miloš Degenek	28 April 1994 (aged 32)	57	1	(Cyprus Football Association) APOEL
3	DF	Alessandro Circati	10 October 2003 (aged 22)	13	1	(Italian Football Federation) Parma
4	DF	Jacob Italiano	30 July 2001 (aged 24)	5	0	(Austrian Football Association) Grazer AK
5	DF	Jordan Bos	29 October 2002 (aged 23)	27	4	(Royal Dutch Football Association) Feyenoord
6	DF	Jason Geria	10 May 1993 (aged 33)	14	0	(Japan Football Association) Albirex Niigata
7	FW	Mathew Leckie	4 February 1991 (aged 35)	80	14	(Football Australia) Melbourne City
8	MF	Connor Metcalfe	5 November 1999 (aged 26)	36	1	(German Football Association) FC St. Pauli
9	FW	Mohamed Touré	26 March 2004 (aged 22)	10	2	(The Football Association) Norwich City
10	FW	Ajdin Hrustic	5 July 1996 (aged 29)	37	4	(Royal Dutch Football Association) Heracles Almelo
11	FW	Awer Mabil	15 September 1995 (aged 30)	38	10	(Royal Spanish Football Federation) Castellón
12	GK	Paul Izzo	6 January 1995 (aged 31)	4	0	(Danish Football Association) Randers
13	MF	Aiden O'Neill	4 July 1998 (aged 27)	31	0	(United States Soccer Federation) New York City FC
14	MF	Cammy Devlin	7 June 1998 (aged 28)	5	0	(Scottish Football Association) Heart of Midlothian
15	DF	Kai Trewin	18 May 2001 (aged 25)	6	0	(United States Soccer Federation) New York City FC
16	DF	Aziz Behich	16 December 1990 (aged 35)	84	3	(Football Australia) Melbourne City
17	FW	Nestory Irankunda	9 February 2006 (aged 20)	15	5	(The Football Association) Watford
18	GK	Patrick Beach	6 August 2003 (aged 22)	2	0	(Football Australia) Melbourne City
19	DF	Harry Souttar	22 October 1998 (aged 27)	38	11	(The Football Association) Leicester City
20	FW	Cristian Volpato	15 November 2003 (aged 22)	1	0	(Italian Football Federation) Sassuolo
21	DF	Cameron Burgess	21 October 1995 (aged 30)	27	0	(Football Association of Wales) Swansea City
22	MF	Jackson Irvine	7 March 1993 (aged 33)	82	14	(German Football Association) FC St. Pauli
23	FW	Nishan Velupillay	7 May 2001 (aged 25)	7	3	(Football Australia) Melbourne Victory
24	MF	Paul Okon-Engstler	24 January 2005 (aged 21)	6	0	(Football Australia) Sydney FC
25	DF	Lucas Herrington	5 September 2007 (aged 18)	4	0	(United States Soccer Federation) Colorado Rapids
26	FW	Tete Yengi	28 November 2000 (aged 25)	1	1	(Japan Football Association) Machida Zelvia

=== Paraguay ===
Coach: (Argentina) Gustavo Alfaro

Paraguay announced a 55-man preliminary squad on May 12. They announced their final squad on June 1.

No.	Pos.	Player	Date of birth (age)	Caps	Goals	Club
1	GK	Gatito Fernández	29 March 1988 (aged 38)	31	0	(Paraguayan Football Association) Cerro Porteño
2	DF	Gustavo Velázquez	17 April 1991 (aged 35)	13	1	(Paraguayan Football Association) Cerro Porteño
3	DF	Omar Alderete	26 December 1996 (aged 29)	36	3	(The Football Association) Sunderland
4	DF	Juan José Cáceres	1 June 2000 (aged 26)	17	0	(Russian Football Union) Dynamo Moscow
5	DF	Fabián Balbuena	23 August 1991 (aged 34)	48	2	(Brazilian Football Confederation) Grêmio
6	DF	Júnior Alonso	9 February 1993 (aged 33)	71	3	(Brazilian Football Confederation) Atlético Mineiro
7	MF	Ramón Sosa	31 August 1999 (aged 26)	29	1	(Brazilian Football Confederation) Palmeiras
8	MF	Diego Gómez	27 March 2003 (aged 23)	24	3	(The Football Association) Brighton & Hove Albion
9	FW	Antonio Sanabria	4 March 1996 (aged 30)	48	7	(Italian Football Federation) Cremonese
10	MF	Miguel Almirón	10 February 1994 (aged 32)	76	10	(United States Soccer Federation) Atlanta United FC
11	MF	Maurício	22 June 2001 (aged 24)	3	0	(Brazilian Football Confederation) Palmeiras
12	GK	Orlando Gill	11 June 2000 (aged 26)	6	0	(Argentine Football Association) San Lorenzo
13	DF	José Canale	20 July 1996 (aged 29)	2	0	(Argentine Football Association) Lanús
14	MF	Andrés Cubas	11 May 1996 (aged 30)	33	0	(Canadian Soccer Association) Vancouver Whitecaps FC
15	DF	Gustavo Gómez (captain)	6 May 1993 (aged 33)	89	4	(Brazilian Football Confederation) Palmeiras
16	MF	Damián Bobadilla	11 July 2001 (aged 24)	19	1	(Brazilian Football Confederation) São Paulo
17	FW	Kaku	11 January 1995 (aged 31)	33	6	(United Arab Emirates Football Association) Al Ain
18	FW	Álex Arce	16 June 1995 (aged 30)	15	1	(Argentine Football Association) Independiente Rivadavia
19	FW	Julio Enciso	23 January 2004 (aged 22)	32	4	(French Football Federation) Strasbourg
20	MF	Braian Ojeda	27 June 2000 (aged 25)	17	0	(United States Soccer Federation) Orlando City SC
21	FW	Gabriel Ávalos	9 July 1991 (aged 34)	23	2	(Argentine Football Association) Independiente
22	GK	Gastón Olveira	21 April 1993 (aged 33)	1	0	(Paraguayan Football Association) Olimpia
23	MF	Matías Galarza	11 February 2002 (aged 24)	15	3	(United States Soccer Federation) Atlanta United FC
24	MF	Gustavo Caballero	21 September 2001 (aged 24)	2	1	(The Football Association) Portsmouth
25	FW	Isidro Pitta	14 August 1999 (aged 26)	5	0	(Brazilian Football Confederation) Red Bull Bragantino
26	DF	Alexandro Maidana	26 July 2005 (aged 20)	2	1	(Argentine Football Association) Talleres

=== Turkey ===
Coach: (Italy) Vincenzo Montella

Turkey announced a 35-man preliminary squad on May 18. Their final squad was announced on June 2.

No.	Pos.	Player	Date of birth (age)	Caps	Goals	Club
1	GK	Mert Günok	1 March 1989 (aged 37)	37	0	(Turkish Football Federation) Fenerbahçe
2	DF	Zeki Çelik	17 February 1997 (aged 29)	61	3	(Italian Football Federation) Roma
3	DF	Merih Demiral	5 March 1998 (aged 28)	62	6	(Saudi Arabian Football Federation) Al-Ahli
4	DF	Çağlar Söyüncü	23 May 1996 (aged 30)	60	2	(Turkish Football Federation) Fenerbahçe
5	MF	Salih Özcan	11 January 1998 (aged 28)	30	1	(German Football Association) Borussia Dortmund
6	MF	Orkun Kökçü	29 December 2000 (aged 25)	50	4	(Turkish Football Federation) Beşiktaş
7	FW	Kerem Aktürkoğlu	21 October 1998 (aged 27)	52	15	(Turkish Football Federation) Fenerbahçe
8	FW	Arda Güler	25 February 2005 (aged 21)	29	6	(Royal Spanish Football Federation) Real Madrid
9	FW	Deniz Gül	2 July 2004 (aged 21)	8	2	(Portuguese Football Federation) Porto
10	MF	Hakan Çalhanoğlu (captain)	8 February 1994 (aged 32)	105	22	(Italian Football Federation) Inter Milan
11	FW	Kenan Yıldız	4 May 2005 (aged 21)	28	5	(Italian Football Federation) Juventus
12	GK	Altay Bayındır	14 April 1998 (aged 28)	12	0	(The Football Association) Manchester United
13	DF	Eren Elmalı	7 July 2000 (aged 25)	23	0	(Turkish Football Federation) Galatasaray
14	DF	Abdülkerim Bardakcı	7 September 1994 (aged 31)	27	2	(Turkish Football Federation) Galatasaray
15	DF	Ozan Kabak	25 March 2000 (aged 26)	30	2	(German Football Association) TSG Hoffenheim
16	MF	İsmail Yüksek	26 January 1999 (aged 27)	32	1	(Turkish Football Federation) Fenerbahçe
17	FW	İrfan Can Kahveci	15 July 1995 (aged 30)	47	6	(Turkish Football Federation) Kasımpaşa
18	DF	Mert Müldür	3 April 1999 (aged 27)	45	3	(Turkish Football Federation) Fenerbahçe
19	FW	Yunus Akgün	7 July 2000 (aged 25)	19	4	(Turkish Football Federation) Galatasaray
20	DF	Ferdi Kadıoğlu	7 October 1999 (aged 26)	30	2	(The Football Association) Brighton & Hove Albion
21	FW	Barış Alper Yılmaz	23 May 2000 (aged 26)	35	4	(Turkish Football Federation) Galatasaray
22	MF	Kaan Ayhan	10 November 1994 (aged 31)	73	5	(Turkish Football Federation) Galatasaray
23	GK	Uğurcan Çakır	5 April 1996 (aged 30)	39	0	(Turkish Football Federation) Galatasaray
24	FW	Oğuz Aydın	27 October 2000 (aged 25)	11	0	(Turkish Football Federation) Fenerbahçe
25	DF	Samet Akaydin	13 March 1994 (aged 32)	19	1	(Turkish Football Federation) Çaykur Rizespor
26	FW	Can Uzun	11 November 2005 (aged 20)	6	1	(German Football Association) Eintracht Frankfurt

=== United States ===
Coach: (Argentina) Mauricio Pochettino

The United States announced their final squad on May 26.

No.	Pos.	Player	Date of birth (age)	Caps	Goals	Club
1	GK	Matt Turner	June 24, 1994 (aged 31)	54	0	(United States Soccer Federation) New England Revolution
2	DF	Sergiño Dest	November 3, 2000 (aged 25)	39	3	(Royal Dutch Football Association) PSV Eindhoven
3	DF	Chris Richards	March 28, 2000 (aged 26)	36	3	(The Football Association) Crystal Palace
4	MF	Tyler Adams	February 14, 1999 (aged 27)	54	2	(The Football Association) Bournemouth
5	DF	Antonee Robinson	August 8, 1997 (aged 28)	54	5	(The Football Association) Fulham
6	DF	Auston Trusty	August 12, 1998 (aged 27)	8	0	(Scottish Football Association) Celtic
7	MF	Giovanni Reyna	November 13, 2002 (aged 23)	38	9	(German Football Association) Borussia Mönchengladbach
8	MF	Weston McKennie	August 28, 1998 (aged 27)	66	12	(Italian Football Federation) Juventus
9	FW	Ricardo Pepi	January 9, 2003 (aged 23)	37	13	(Royal Dutch Football Association) PSV Eindhoven
10	FW	Christian Pulisic	September 18, 1998 (aged 27)	86	33	(Italian Football Federation) AC Milan
11	FW	Brenden Aaronson	October 22, 2000 (aged 25)	58	9	(The Football Association) Leeds United
12	DF	Miles Robinson	March 14, 1997 (aged 29)	40	3	(United States Soccer Federation) FC Cincinnati
13	DF	Tim Ream (captain)	October 5, 1987 (aged 38)	82	1	(United States Soccer Federation) Charlotte FC
14	MF	Sebastian Berhalter	May 10, 2001 (aged 25)	13	1	(Canadian Soccer Association) Vancouver Whitecaps FC
15	MF	Cristian Roldan	June 3, 1995 (aged 31)	47	0	(United States Soccer Federation) Seattle Sounders FC
16	DF	Alex Freeman	August 9, 2004 (aged 21)	17	2	(Royal Spanish Football Federation) Villarreal
17	MF	Malik Tillman	May 28, 2002 (aged 24)	30	3	(German Football Association) Bayer Leverkusen
18	DF	Max Arfsten	April 19, 2001 (aged 25)	20	1	(United States Soccer Federation) Columbus Crew
19	FW	Haji Wright	March 27, 1998 (aged 28)	20	7	(The Football Association) Coventry City
20	FW	Folarin Balogun	July 3, 2001 (aged 24)	27	9	(French Football Federation) Monaco
21	FW	Timothy Weah	February 22, 2000 (aged 26)	51	7	(French Football Federation) Marseille
22	DF	Mark McKenzie	February 25, 1999 (aged 27)	29	0	(French Football Federation) Toulouse
23	DF	Joe Scally	December 31, 2002 (aged 23)	26	0	(German Football Association) Borussia Mönchengladbach
24	GK	Matt Freese	September 2, 1998 (aged 27)	15	0	(United States Soccer Federation) New York City FC
25	GK	Chris Brady	March 3, 2004 (aged 22)	1	0	(United States Soccer Federation) Chicago Fire FC
26	FW	Alejandro Zendejas	February 7, 1998 (aged 28)	14	2	(Mexican Football Federation) América

== Group E ==
=== Curaçao ===
Coach: (Netherlands) Dick Advocaat

Curaçao announced their final squad on May 18.

No.	Pos.	Player	Date of birth (age)	Caps	Goals	Club
1	GK	Eloy Room	6 February 1989 (aged 37)	71	0	(United States Soccer Federation) Miami FC
2	DF	Shurandy Sambo	19 August 2001 (aged 24)	8	0	(Royal Dutch Football Association) Sparta Rotterdam
3	DF	Juriën Gaari	23 December 1993 (aged 32)	60	1	(Saudi Arabian Football Federation) Abha
4	DF	Roshon van Eijma	9 June 1998 (aged 28)	28	1	(Royal Dutch Football Association) RKC Waalwijk
5	DF	Sherel Floranus	23 August 1998 (aged 27)	28	0	(Royal Dutch Football Association) PEC Zwolle
6	MF	Godfried Roemeratoe	19 August 1999 (aged 26)	28	1	(Royal Dutch Football Association) RKC Waalwijk
7	MF	Juninho Bacuna	7 August 1997 (aged 28)	49	15	(Royal Dutch Football Association) Volendam
8	MF	Livano Comenencia	3 February 2004 (aged 22)	20	2	(Swiss Football Association) Zürich
9	FW	Jürgen Locadia	7 November 1993 (aged 32)	13	1	(United States Soccer Federation) Miami FC
10	MF	Leandro Bacuna (captain)	21 August 1991 (aged 34)	72	16	(Turkish Football Federation) Iğdır
11	FW	Jeremy Antonisse	29 March 2002 (aged 24)	27	4	(Hellenic Football Federation) Kifisia
12	FW	Sontje Hansen	18 May 2002 (aged 24)	6	1	(The Football Association) Middlesbrough
13	FW	Tyrese Noslin	11 September 2002 (aged 23)	7	1	(Royal Dutch Football Association) Telstar
14	FW	Kenji Gorré	29 September 1994 (aged 31)	38	6	(Israel Football Association) Maccabi Haifa
15	MF	Ar'jany Martha	4 September 2003 (aged 22)	9	2	(The Football Association) Rotherham United
16	FW	Jearl Margaritha	10 April 2000 (aged 26)	22	5	(Royal Belgian Football Association) Beveren
17	FW	Brandley Kuwas	19 September 1992 (aged 33)	35	2	(Royal Dutch Football Association) Volendam
18	DF	Armando Obispo	5 March 1999 (aged 27)	6	0	(Royal Dutch Football Association) PSV Eindhoven
19	FW	Gervane Kastaneer	9 June 1996 (aged 30)	29	9	(Football Association of Malaysia) Terengganu
20	DF	Joshua Brenet	20 March 1994 (aged 32)	18	2	(Turkish Football Federation) Kayserispor
21	MF	Tahith Chong	4 December 1999 (aged 26)	6	3	(The Football Association) Sheffield United
22	MF	Kevin Felida	11 November 1999 (aged 26)	19	1	(Royal Dutch Football Association) Den Bosch
23	DF	Riechedly Bazoer	12 October 1996 (aged 29)	5	0	(Turkish Football Federation) Konyaspor
24	DF	Deveron Fonville	16 May 2003 (aged 23)	2	0	(Royal Dutch Football Association) NEC
25	GK	Tyrick Bodak	15 May 2002 (aged 24)	4	0	(Royal Dutch Football Association) Telstar
26	GK	Trevor Doornbusch	6 July 1999 (aged 26)	8	0	(Royal Dutch Football Association) VVV-Venlo

=== Ecuador ===
Coach: (Argentina) Sebastián Beccacece

Ecuador announced their final squad on May 31.

No.	Pos.	Player	Date of birth (age)	Caps	Goals	Club
1	GK	Hernán Galíndez	30 March 1987 (aged 39)	35	0	(Argentine Football Association) Huracán
2	DF	Félix Torres	11 January 1997 (aged 29)	49	5	(Brazilian Football Confederation) Internacional
3	DF	Piero Hincapié	9 January 2002 (aged 24)	52	3	(The Football Association) Arsenal
4	DF	Joel Ordóñez	21 April 2004 (aged 22)	17	0	(Royal Belgian Football Association) Club Brugge
5	MF	Jordy Alcívar	5 August 1999 (aged 26)	11	1	(Ecuadorian Football Federation) Independiente del Valle
6	DF	Willian Pacho	16 October 2001 (aged 24)	34	2	(French Football Federation) Paris Saint-Germain
7	DF	Pervis Estupiñán	21 January 1998 (aged 28)	54	5	(Italian Football Federation) AC Milan
8	MF	Anthony Valencia	21 July 2003 (aged 22)	3	1	(Royal Belgian Football Association) Antwerp
9	FW	John Yeboah	23 June 2000 (aged 25)	23	3	(Italian Football Federation) Venezia
10	MF	Kendry Páez	4 May 2007 (aged 19)	26	2	(Argentine Football Association) River Plate
11	FW	Kevin Rodríguez	4 March 2000 (aged 26)	31	2	(Royal Belgian Football Association) Union Saint-Gilloise
12	GK	Moisés Ramírez	9 September 2000 (aged 25)	7	0	(Hellenic Football Federation) Kifisia
13	FW	Enner Valencia (captain)	4 November 1989 (aged 36)	105	49	(Mexican Football Federation) Pachuca
14	MF	Alan Minda	14 May 2003 (aged 23)	20	2	(Brazilian Football Confederation) Atlético Mineiro
15	MF	Pedro Vite	9 March 2002 (aged 24)	17	1	(Mexican Football Federation) Pumas UNAM
16	FW	Jordy Caicedo	18 November 1997 (aged 28)	20	4	(Argentine Football Association) Huracán
17	DF	Ángelo Preciado	18 February 1998 (aged 28)	55	0	(Brazilian Football Confederation) Atlético Mineiro
18	MF	Denil Castillo	24 March 2004 (aged 22)	5	0	(Danish Football Association) Midtjylland
19	FW	Gonzalo Plata	1 November 2000 (aged 25)	50	8	(Brazilian Football Confederation) Flamengo
20	FW	Nilson Angulo	19 June 2003 (aged 22)	14	2	(The Football Association) Sunderland
21	MF	Alan Franco	21 August 1998 (aged 27)	58	1	(Brazilian Football Confederation) Atlético Mineiro
22	GK	Gonzalo Valle	28 February 1996 (aged 30)	4	0	(Ecuadorian Football Federation) LDU Quito
23	MF	Moisés Caicedo	2 November 2001 (aged 24)	61	3	(The Football Association) Chelsea
24	FW	Jeremy Arévalo	19 March 2005 (aged 21)	4	0	(German Football Association) VfB Stuttgart
25	DF	Jackson Porozo	4 August 2000 (aged 25)	10	1	(Mexican Football Federation) Tijuana
26	DF	Yaimar Medina	5 November 2004 (aged 21)	6	0	(Royal Belgian Football Association) Genk

=== Germany ===
Coach: Julian Nagelsmann

Germany announced their final squad on May 21. Lennart Karl withdrew injured and was replaced by Assan Ouédraogo on June 5.

No.	Pos.	Player	Date of birth (age)	Caps	Goals	Club
1	GK	Manuel Neuer	27 March 1986 (aged 40)	124	0	(German Football Association) Bayern Munich
2	DF	Antonio Rüdiger	3 March 1993 (aged 33)	82	3	(Royal Spanish Football Federation) Real Madrid
3	DF	Waldemar Anton	20 July 1996 (aged 29)	13	0	(German Football Association) Borussia Dortmund
4	DF	Jonathan Tah	11 February 1996 (aged 30)	47	1	(German Football Association) Bayern Munich
5	MF	Aleksandar Pavlović	3 May 2004 (aged 22)	11	1	(German Football Association) Bayern Munich
6	DF	Joshua Kimmich (captain)	8 February 1995 (aged 31)	110	10	(German Football Association) Bayern Munich
7	FW	Kai Havertz	11 June 1999 (aged 27)	58	22	(The Football Association) Arsenal
8	MF	Leon Goretzka	6 February 1995 (aged 31)	70	15	(German Football Association) Bayern Munich
9	MF	Jamie Leweling	26 February 2001 (aged 25)	5	1	(German Football Association) VfB Stuttgart
10	MF	Jamal Musiala	26 February 2003 (aged 23)	42	9	(German Football Association) Bayern Munich
11	FW	Nick Woltemade	14 February 2002 (aged 24)	11	4	(The Football Association) Newcastle United
12	GK	Oliver Baumann	2 June 1990 (aged 36)	13	0	(German Football Association) TSG Hoffenheim
13	MF	Pascal Groß	15 June 1991 (aged 34)	18	1	(The Football Association) Brighton & Hove Albion
14	FW	Maximilian Beier	17 October 2002 (aged 23)	9	0	(German Football Association) Borussia Dortmund
15	DF	Nico Schlotterbeck	1 December 1999 (aged 26)	27	0	(German Football Association) Borussia Dortmund
16	MF	Angelo Stiller	4 April 2001 (aged 25)	8	0	(German Football Association) VfB Stuttgart
17	MF	Florian Wirtz	3 May 2003 (aged 23)	41	11	(The Football Association) Liverpool
18	DF	Nathaniel Brown	16 June 2003 (aged 22)	5	0	(German Football Association) Eintracht Frankfurt
19	MF	Leroy Sané	11 January 1996 (aged 30)	76	17	(Turkish Football Federation) Galatasaray
20	MF	Nadiem Amiri	27 October 1996 (aged 29)	11	1	(German Football Association) Mainz 05
21	GK	Alexander Nübel	30 September 1996 (aged 29)	3	0	(German Football Association) VfB Stuttgart
22	DF	David Raum	22 April 1998 (aged 28)	37	1	(German Football Association) RB Leipzig
23	MF	Felix Nmecha	10 October 2000 (aged 25)	8	1	(German Football Association) Borussia Dortmund
24	DF	Malick Thiaw	8 August 2001 (aged 24)	5	0	(The Football Association) Newcastle United
25	MF	Assan Ouédraogo	9 May 2006 (aged 20)	1	1	(German Football Association) RB Leipzig
26	FW	Deniz Undav	19 July 1996 (aged 29)	9	6	(German Football Association) VfB Stuttgart

=== Ivory Coast ===
Coach: Emerse Faé

Ivory Coast announced their final squad on May 15. Clément Akpa withdrew injured and was replaced by Christopher Opéri on May 29.

No.	Pos.	Player	Date of birth (age)	Caps	Goals	Club
1	GK	Yahia Fofana	21 August 2000 (aged 25)	35	0	(Turkish Football Federation) Çaykur Rizespor
2	DF	Ousmane Diomande	4 December 2003 (aged 22)	15	1	(Portuguese Football Federation) Sporting CP
3	DF	Ghislain Konan	27 December 1995 (aged 30)	54	0	(Portuguese Football Federation) Gil Vicente
4	MF	Jean Michaël Seri	19 July 1991 (aged 34)	65	4	(Football Association of Slovenia) Maribor
5	DF	Wilfried Singo	25 December 2000 (aged 25)	34	1	(Turkish Football Federation) Galatasaray
6	MF	Seko Fofana	7 May 1995 (aged 31)	33	7	(Portuguese Football Federation) Porto
7	DF	Odilon Kossounou	4 January 2001 (aged 25)	36	0	(Italian Football Federation) Atalanta
8	MF	Franck Kessié (captain)	19 December 1996 (aged 29)	102	15	(Saudi Arabian Football Federation) Al-Ahli
9	FW	Ange-Yoan Bonny	25 October 2003 (aged 22)	1	0	(Italian Football Federation) Inter Milan
10	FW	Simon Adingra	1 January 2002 (aged 24)	29	5	(French Football Federation) Monaco
11	FW	Yan Diomande	14 November 2006 (aged 19)	10	3	(German Football Association) RB Leipzig
12	FW	Elye Wahi	2 January 2003 (aged 23)	2	0	(French Football Federation) Nice
13	DF	Christopher Opéri	29 April 1997 (aged 29)	12	0	(Turkish Football Federation) İstanbul Başakşehir
14	FW	Oumar Diakité	20 December 2003 (aged 22)	30	6	(Royal Belgian Football Association) Cercle Brugge
15	FW	Amad Diallo	11 July 2002 (aged 23)	19	6	(The Football Association) Manchester United
16	GK	Mohamed Koné	7 March 2002 (aged 24)	0	0	(Royal Belgian Football Association) Charleroi
17	DF	Guéla Doué	17 October 2002 (aged 23)	20	3	(French Football Federation) Strasbourg
18	MF	Ibrahim Sangaré	2 December 1997 (aged 28)	57	12	(The Football Association) Nottingham Forest
19	FW	Nicolas Pépé	29 May 1995 (aged 31)	56	12	(Royal Spanish Football Federation) Villarreal
20	DF	Emmanuel Agbadou	17 June 1997 (aged 28)	20	2	(Turkish Football Federation) Beşiktaş
21	DF	Evan Ndicka	20 August 1999 (aged 26)	28	0	(Italian Football Federation) Roma
22	FW	Evann Guessand	1 July 2001 (aged 24)	21	4	(The Football Association) Crystal Palace
23	GK	Alban Lafont	23 January 1999 (aged 27)	4	0	(Hellenic Football Federation) Panathinaikos
24	FW	Bazoumana Touré	2 March 2006 (aged 20)	6	2	(German Football Association) TSG Hoffenheim
25	MF	Parfait Guiagon	22 February 2001 (aged 25)	5	0	(Royal Belgian Football Association) Charleroi
26	MF	Christ Inao Oulaï	6 April 2006 (aged 20)	9	0	(Turkish Football Federation) Trabzonspor

== Group F ==
=== Japan ===
Coach: Hajime Moriyasu

Japan announced their final squad on May 15. Wataru Endo withdrew injured and was replaced by Shūto Machino on June 11.

No.	Pos.	Player	Date of birth (age)	Caps	Goals	Club
1	GK	Zion Suzuki	21 August 2002 (aged 23)	24	0	(Italian Football Federation) Parma
2	DF	Yukinari Sugawara	28 June 2000 (aged 25)	21	2	(German Football Association) Werder Bremen
3	DF	Shōgo Taniguchi	15 July 1991 (aged 34)	38	1	(Royal Belgian Football Association) Sint-Truiden
4	DF	Kō Itakura (captain)	27 January 1997 (aged 29)	40	2	(Royal Dutch Football Association) Ajax
5	DF	Yūto Nagatomo	12 September 1986 (aged 39)	145	4	(Japan Football Association) FC Tokyo
6	FW	Shūto Machino	30 September 1999 (aged 26)	14	5	(German Football Association) Borussia Mönchengladbach
7	MF	Ao Tanaka	10 September 1998 (aged 27)	38	8	(The Football Association) Leeds United
8	MF	Takefusa Kubo	4 June 2001 (aged 25)	49	7	(Royal Spanish Football Federation) Real Sociedad
9	FW	Keisuke Gotō	3 June 2005 (aged 21)	4	0	(Royal Belgian Football Association) Sint-Truiden
10	MF	Ritsu Dōan	16 June 1998 (aged 27)	65	11	(German Football Association) Eintracht Frankfurt
11	MF	Daizen Maeda	20 October 1997 (aged 28)	27	4	(Scottish Football Association) Celtic
12	GK	Keisuke Ōsako	28 July 1999 (aged 26)	11	0	(Japan Football Association) Sanfrecce Hiroshima
13	MF	Keito Nakamura	28 July 2000 (aged 25)	25	10	(French Football Federation) Reims
14	MF	Junya Itō	9 March 1993 (aged 33)	69	15	(Royal Belgian Football Association) Genk
15	MF	Daichi Kamada	5 August 1996 (aged 29)	49	12	(The Football Association) Crystal Palace
16	DF	Tsuyoshi Watanabe	5 February 1997 (aged 29)	11	0	(Royal Dutch Football Association) Feyenoord
17	MF	Yuito Suzuki	25 October 2001 (aged 24)	6	0	(German Football Association) SC Freiburg
18	FW	Ayase Ueda	28 August 1998 (aged 27)	39	16	(Royal Dutch Football Association) Feyenoord
19	FW	Kōki Ogawa	8 August 1997 (aged 28)	15	11	(Royal Dutch Football Association) NEC
20	DF	Ayumu Seko	7 June 2000 (aged 26)	14	0	(French Football Federation) Le Havre
21	DF	Hiroki Itō	12 May 1999 (aged 27)	24	1	(German Football Association) Bayern Munich
22	DF	Takehiro Tomiyasu	5 November 1998 (aged 27)	43	1	(Royal Dutch Football Association) Ajax
23	GK	Tomoki Hayakawa	3 March 1999 (aged 27)	4	0	(Japan Football Association) Kashima Antlers
24	MF	Kaishū Sano	30 December 2000 (aged 25)	13	0	(German Football Association) Mainz 05
25	DF	Junnosuke Suzuki	12 July 2003 (aged 22)	6	0	(Danish Football Association) Copenhagen
26	FW	Kento Shiogai	26 March 2005 (aged 21)	2	0	(German Football Association) VfL Wolfsburg

=== Netherlands ===
Coach: Ronald Koeman

The Netherlands announced their final squad on May 27. Jurriën Timber withdrew injured and was replaced by Lutsharel Geertruida on June 8.

No.	Pos.	Player	Date of birth (age)	Caps	Goals	Club
1	GK	Bart Verbruggen	18 August 2002 (aged 23)	29	0	(The Football Association) Brighton & Hove Albion
2	DF	Lutsharel Geertruida	18 July 2000 (aged 25)	21	0	(The Football Association) Sunderland
3	MF	Marten de Roon	29 March 1991 (aged 35)	43	1	(Italian Football Federation) Atalanta
4	DF	Virgil van Dijk (captain)	8 July 1991 (aged 34)	92	12	(The Football Association) Liverpool
5	DF	Nathan Aké	18 February 1995 (aged 31)	59	5	(The Football Association) Manchester City
6	DF	Jan Paul van Hecke	8 June 2000 (aged 26)	12	0	(The Football Association) Brighton & Hove Albion
7	MF	Justin Kluivert	5 May 1999 (aged 27)	12	0	(The Football Association) Bournemouth
8	MF	Ryan Gravenberch	16 May 2002 (aged 24)	27	1	(The Football Association) Liverpool
9	FW	Wout Weghorst	7 August 1992 (aged 33)	52	14	(Royal Dutch Football Association) Ajax
10	FW	Memphis Depay	13 February 1994 (aged 32)	109	55	(Brazilian Football Confederation) Corinthians
11	FW	Cody Gakpo	7 May 1999 (aged 27)	50	21	(The Football Association) Liverpool
12	DF	Mats Wieffer	16 November 1999 (aged 26)	15	1	(The Football Association) Brighton & Hove Albion
13	GK	Robin Roefs	17 January 2003 (aged 23)	1	0	(The Football Association) Sunderland
14	MF	Tijjani Reijnders	29 July 1998 (aged 27)	32	7	(The Football Association) Manchester City
15	DF	Micky van de Ven	19 April 2001 (aged 25)	21	1	(The Football Association) Tottenham Hotspur
16	MF	Guus Til	22 December 1997 (aged 28)	7	1	(Royal Dutch Football Association) PSV Eindhoven
17	FW	Noa Lang	17 June 1999 (aged 26)	15	3	(Turkish Football Federation) Galatasaray
18	FW	Donyell Malen	19 January 1999 (aged 27)	53	13	(Italian Football Federation) Roma
19	FW	Brian Brobbey	1 February 2002 (aged 24)	12	1	(The Football Association) Sunderland
20	MF	Teun Koopmeiners	28 February 1998 (aged 28)	28	3	(Italian Football Federation) Juventus
21	MF	Frenkie de Jong	12 May 1997 (aged 29)	66	2	(Royal Spanish Football Federation) Barcelona
22	DF	Denzel Dumfries	18 April 1996 (aged 30)	72	11	(Italian Football Federation) Inter Milan
23	GK	Mark Flekken	13 June 1993 (aged 32)	12	0	(German Football Association) Bayer Leverkusen
24	FW	Crysencio Summerville	30 October 2001 (aged 24)	2	0	(The Football Association) West Ham United
25	DF	Jorrel Hato	7 March 2006 (aged 20)	8	0	(The Football Association) Chelsea
26	MF	Quinten Timber	17 June 2001 (aged 24)	11	1	(French Football Federation) Marseille

=== Sweden ===
Coach: (England) Graham Potter

Sweden announced their final squad on May 12. Emil Holm withdrew injured and was replaced by Herman Johansson on May 30.

No.	Pos.	Player	Date of birth (age)	Caps	Goals	Club
1	GK	Jacob Widell Zetterström	11 July 1998 (aged 27)	3	0	(The Football Association) Derby County
2	DF	Gustaf Lagerbielke	10 April 2000 (aged 26)	11	2	(Portuguese Football Federation) Braga
3	DF	Victor Lindelöf (captain)	17 July 1994 (aged 31)	76	3	(The Football Association) Aston Villa
4	DF	Isak Hien	13 January 1999 (aged 27)	29	0	(Italian Football Federation) Atalanta
5	DF	Gabriel Gudmundsson	29 April 1999 (aged 27)	24	0	(The Football Association) Leeds United
6	DF	Herman Johansson	16 October 1997 (aged 28)	3	0	(United States Soccer Federation) FC Dallas
7	MF	Lucas Bergvall	2 February 2006 (aged 20)	10	0	(The Football Association) Tottenham Hotspur
8	DF	Daniel Svensson	12 February 2002 (aged 24)	13	0	(German Football Association) Borussia Dortmund
9	FW	Alexander Isak	21 September 1999 (aged 26)	58	17	(The Football Association) Liverpool
10	MF	Benjamin Nygren	8 July 2001 (aged 24)	11	3	(Scottish Football Association) Celtic
11	FW	Anthony Elanga	27 April 2002 (aged 24)	30	6	(The Football Association) Newcastle United
12	GK	Viktor Johansson	14 September 1998 (aged 27)	12	0	(The Football Association) Stoke City
13	MF	Ken Sema	30 September 1993 (aged 32)	33	5	(Cyprus Football Association) Pafos
14	DF	Hjalmar Ekdal	21 October 1998 (aged 27)	13	0	(The Football Association) Burnley
15	DF	Carl Starfelt	1 June 1995 (aged 31)	18	0	(Royal Spanish Football Federation) Celta Vigo
16	MF	Jesper Karlström	21 June 1995 (aged 30)	25	0	(Italian Football Federation) Udinese
17	FW	Viktor Gyökeres	4 June 1998 (aged 28)	33	20	(The Football Association) Arsenal
18	MF	Yasin Ayari	6 October 2003 (aged 22)	21	3	(The Football Association) Brighton & Hove Albion
19	MF	Mattias Svanberg	5 January 1999 (aged 27)	41	2	(German Football Association) VfL Wolfsburg
20	DF	Eric Smith	8 January 1997 (aged 29)	2	0	(German Football Association) FC St. Pauli
21	DF	Alexander Bernhardsson	8 September 1998 (aged 27)	11	0	(German Football Association) Holstein Kiel
22	MF	Besfort Zeneli	21 November 2002 (aged 23)	8	0	(Royal Belgian Football Association) Union Saint-Gilloise
23	GK	Kristoffer Nordfeldt	23 June 1989 (aged 36)	21	0	(Swedish Football Association) AIK
24	DF	Elliot Stroud	22 June 2002 (aged 23)	1	0	(Swedish Football Association) Mjällby AIF
25	FW	Gustaf Nilsson	23 May 1997 (aged 29)	10	4	(Royal Belgian Football Association) Club Brugge
26	FW	Taha Ali	1 July 1998 (aged 27)	2	0	(Swedish Football Association) Malmö FF

=== Tunisia ===
Coach: (France) Sabri Lamouchi (first match) / (France) Hervé Renard (remaining matches)

Tunisia announced their final squad on May 15. Coach Sabri Lamouchi was fired after the first match on June 15, and was replaced by Hervé Renard the next day.

No.	Pos.	Player	Date of birth (age)	Caps	Goals	Club
1	GK	Mouhib Chamakh	25 August 2001 (aged 24)	3	0	(Tunisian Football Federation) Club Africain
2	DF	Ali Abdi	20 December 1993 (aged 32)	46	7	(French Football Federation) Nice
3	DF	Montassar Talbi	26 May 1998 (aged 28)	64	4	(French Football Federation) Lorient
4	DF	Omar Rekik	20 December 2001 (aged 24)	6	0	(Football Association of Slovenia) Maribor
5	DF	Adem Arous	17 July 2004 (aged 21)	2	0	(Turkish Football Federation) Kasımpaşa
6	DF	Dylan Bronn	19 June 1995 (aged 30)	52	2	(Swiss Football Association) Servette
7	FW	Elias Achouri	10 February 1999 (aged 27)	30	4	(Danish Football Association) Copenhagen
8	FW	Elias Saad	27 December 1999 (aged 26)	15	4	(German Football Association) Hannover 96
9	FW	Hazem Mastouri	18 June 1997 (aged 28)	19	4	(Russian Football Union) Dynamo Makhachkala
10	MF	Hannibal Mejbri	21 January 2003 (aged 23)	45	1	(The Football Association) Burnley
11	MF	Ismaël Gharbi	10 April 2004 (aged 22)	17	2	(German Football Association) FC Augsburg
12	DF	Mortadha Ben Ouanes	2 July 1994 (aged 31)	18	0	(Turkish Football Federation) Kasımpaşa
13	MF	Rani Khedira	27 January 1994 (aged 32)	3	0	(German Football Association) Union Berlin
14	MF	Khalil Ayari	2 February 2005 (aged 21)	4	0	(French Football Federation) Paris Saint-Germain
15	MF	Mohamed Belhadj Mahmoud	24 April 2000 (aged 26)	9	0	(Swiss Football Association) Lugano
16	GK	Aymen Dahmen	28 January 1997 (aged 29)	37	0	(Tunisian Football Federation) CS Sfaxien
17	MF	Ellyes Skhiri (captain)	10 May 1995 (aged 31)	83	4	(German Football Association) Eintracht Frankfurt
18	FW	Rayan Elloumi	17 September 2007 (aged 18)	4	0	(Canadian Soccer Association) Vancouver Whitecaps FC
19	FW	Firas Chaouat	8 May 1996 (aged 30)	30	6	(Tunisian Football Federation) Club Africain
20	DF	Yan Valery	22 February 1999 (aged 27)	22	0	(Swiss Football Association) Young Boys
21	DF	Mohamed Amine Ben Hamida	15 December 1995 (aged 30)	13	0	(Tunisian Football Federation) Espérance de Tunis
22	GK	Sabri Ben Hessen	13 June 1996 (aged 29)	2	0	(Tunisian Football Federation) Étoile du Sahel
23	DF	Moutaz Neffati	4 September 2004 (aged 21)	5	0	(Swedish Football Association) IFK Norrköping
24	DF	Raed Chikhaoui	9 June 2004 (aged 22)	0	0	(Tunisian Football Federation) US Monastir
25	MF	Anis Ben Slimane	16 March 2001 (aged 25)	41	4	(The Football Association) Norwich City
26	MF	Sebastian Tounekti	13 July 2002 (aged 23)	12	1	(Scottish Football Association) Celtic

== Group G ==
=== Belgium ===
Coach: (France) Rudi Garcia

Belgium announced their final squad on May 15.

No.	Pos.	Player	Date of birth (age)	Caps	Goals	Club
1	GK	Thibaut Courtois	11 May 1992 (aged 34)	109	0	(Royal Spanish Football Federation) Real Madrid
2	DF	Zeno Debast	24 October 2003 (aged 22)	26	1	(Portuguese Football Federation) Sporting CP
3	DF	Arthur Theate	25 May 2000 (aged 26)	33	1	(German Football Association) Eintracht Frankfurt
4	DF	Brandon Mechele	28 January 1993 (aged 33)	9	1	(Royal Belgian Football Association) Club Brugge
5	DF	Maxim De Cuyper	22 December 2000 (aged 25)	19	4	(The Football Association) Brighton & Hove Albion
6	MF	Axel Witsel	12 January 1989 (aged 37)	138	12	(Royal Spanish Football Federation) Girona
7	MF	Kevin De Bruyne	28 June 1991 (aged 34)	119	37	(Italian Football Federation) Napoli
8	MF	Youri Tielemans (captain)	7 May 1997 (aged 29)	85	13	(The Football Association) Aston Villa
9	FW	Romelu Lukaku	13 May 1993 (aged 33)	126	90	(Italian Football Federation) Napoli
10	FW	Leandro Trossard	4 December 1994 (aged 31)	51	12	(The Football Association) Arsenal
11	FW	Jérémy Doku	27 May 2002 (aged 24)	43	7	(The Football Association) Manchester City
12	GK	Senne Lammens	7 July 2002 (aged 23)	2	0	(The Football Association) Manchester United
13	GK	Mike Penders	31 July 2005 (aged 20)	0	0	(French Football Federation) Strasbourg
14	FW	Dodi Lukébakio	24 September 1997 (aged 28)	30	6	(Portuguese Football Federation) Benfica
15	DF	Thomas Meunier	12 September 1991 (aged 34)	80	10	(French Football Federation) Lille
16	DF	Koni De Winter	12 June 2002 (aged 23)	8	0	(Italian Football Federation) AC Milan
17	FW	Charles De Ketelaere	10 March 2001 (aged 25)	30	6	(Italian Football Federation) Atalanta
18	DF	Joaquin Seys	28 March 2005 (aged 21)	5	0	(Royal Belgian Football Association) Club Brugge
19	MF	Diego Moreira	6 August 2004 (aged 21)	3	0	(French Football Federation) Strasbourg
20	MF	Hans Vanaken	24 August 1992 (aged 33)	34	7	(Royal Belgian Football Association) Club Brugge
21	DF	Timothy Castagne	5 December 1995 (aged 30)	63	2	(The Football Association) Fulham
22	MF	Alexis Saelemaekers	27 June 1999 (aged 26)	24	2	(Italian Football Federation) AC Milan
23	MF	Nicolas Raskin	23 February 2001 (aged 25)	13	2	(Scottish Football Association) Rangers
24	MF	Amadou Onana	16 August 2001 (aged 24)	29	1	(The Football Association) Aston Villa
25	DF	Nathan Ngoy	10 June 2003 (aged 23)	4	0	(French Football Federation) Lille
26	FW	Matias Fernandez-Pardo	3 February 2005 (aged 21)	2	0	(French Football Federation) Lille

=== Egypt ===
Coach: Hossam Hassan

Egypt announced a 27-man preliminary squad on May 20. They announced their final squad on May 30.

No.	Pos.	Player	Date of birth (age)	Caps	Goals	Club
1	GK	Mohamed El Shenawy	18 December 1988 (aged 37)	76	0	(Egyptian Football Association) Al Ahly
2	DF	Yasser Ibrahim	10 February 1993 (aged 33)	17	1	(Egyptian Football Association) Al Ahly
3	DF	Mohamed Hany	2 February 1996 (aged 30)	42	0	(Egyptian Football Association) Al Ahly
4	DF	Hossam Abdelmaguid	30 April 2001 (aged 25)	13	0	(Egyptian Football Association) Zamalek
5	DF	Ramy Rabia	20 May 1993 (aged 33)	44	5	(United Arab Emirates Football Association) Al Ain
6	DF	Mohamed Abdelmonem	1 February 1999 (aged 27)	36	3	(French Football Federation) Nice
7	FW	Trézéguet	1 October 1994 (aged 31)	96	23	(Egyptian Football Association) Al Ahly
8	MF	Emam Ashour	20 February 1998 (aged 28)	29	0	(Egyptian Football Association) Al Ahly
9	FW	Hamza Abdelkarim	1 January 2008 (aged 18)	2	0	(Royal Spanish Football Federation) Barcelona B
10	FW	Mohamed Salah (captain)	15 June 1992 (aged 33)	116	67	(The Football Association) Liverpool
11	MF	Mostafa Ziko	27 April 1997 (aged 29)	2	2	(Egyptian Football Association) Pyramids
12	FW	Haissem Hassan	8 February 2002 (aged 24)	4	0	(Royal Spanish Football Federation) Oviedo
13	DF	Ahmed Fatouh	22 March 1998 (aged 28)	39	1	(Egyptian Football Association) Zamalek
14	MF	Hamdy Fathy	29 September 1994 (aged 31)	63	3	(Qatar Football Association) Al-Wakrah
15	DF	Karim Hafez	12 March 1996 (aged 30)	9	0	(Egyptian Football Association) Pyramids
16	GK	El Mahdy Soliman	8 June 1987 (aged 39)	0	0	(Egyptian Football Association) Zamalek
17	MF	Mohanad Lasheen	29 May 1996 (aged 30)	23	0	(Egyptian Football Association) Pyramids
18	MF	Nabil Emad	6 April 1996 (aged 30)	12	0	(Saudi Arabian Football Federation) Al-Najma
19	MF	Marwan Attia	1 August 1998 (aged 27)	34	1	(Egyptian Football Association) Al Ahly
20	FW	Ibrahim Adel	23 April 2001 (aged 25)	24	3	(Danish Football Association) Nordsjælland
21	MF	Mahmoud Saber	30 July 2001 (aged 24)	15	1	(Egyptian Football Association) ZED
22	FW	Omar Marmoush	7 February 1999 (aged 27)	50	11	(The Football Association) Manchester City
23	GK	Mostafa Shobeir	15 May 2000 (aged 26)	9	0	(Egyptian Football Association) Al Ahly
24	DF	Tarek Alaa	5 January 2002 (aged 24)	3	0	(Egyptian Football Association) ZED
25	FW	Zizo	10 January 1996 (aged 30)	63	5	(Egyptian Football Association) Al Ahly
26	GK	Mohamed Alaa	1 January 1999 (aged 27)	0	0	(Egyptian Football Association) El Gouna

=== Iran ===
Coach: Amir Ghalenoei

Iran announced a 30-man preliminary squad on May 16. The squad was extended to 31 players on May 21. They announced their final squad on June 1.

No.	Pos.	Player	Date of birth (age)	Caps	Goals	Club
1	GK	Alireza Beiranvand	21 September 1992 (aged 33)	86	0	(Football Federation Islamic Republic of Iran) Tractor
2	DF	Saleh Hardani	26 December 1998 (aged 27)	18	1	(Football Federation Islamic Republic of Iran) Esteghlal
3	DF	Ehsan Hajsafi (captain)	25 February 1990 (aged 36)	146	7	(Football Federation Islamic Republic of Iran) Sepahan
4	DF	Shojae Khalilzadeh	14 May 1989 (aged 37)	58	2	(Football Federation Islamic Republic of Iran) Tractor
5	DF	Milad Mohammadi	29 September 1993 (aged 32)	76	1	(Football Federation Islamic Republic of Iran) Persepolis
6	MF	Saeid Ezatolahi	1 October 1996 (aged 29)	83	2	(United Arab Emirates Football Association) Shabab Al Ahli
7	MF	Alireza Jahanbakhsh	11 August 1993 (aged 32)	99	17	(Royal Belgian Football Association) Dender EH
8	MF	Mohammad Mohebi	20 December 1998 (aged 27)	37	14	(Russian Football Union) Rostov
9	FW	Mehdi Taremi	18 July 1992 (aged 33)	106	60	(Hellenic Football Federation) Olympiacos
10	FW	Mehdi Ghayedi	5 December 1998 (aged 27)	30	10	(United Arab Emirates Football Association) Al Nasr
11	FW	Ali Alipour	11 November 1995 (aged 30)	14	1	(Football Federation Islamic Republic of Iran) Persepolis
12	GK	Payam Niazmand	6 April 1995 (aged 31)	15	0	(Football Federation Islamic Republic of Iran) Persepolis
13	DF	Hossein Kanaanizadegan	23 March 1994 (aged 32)	65	6	(Football Federation Islamic Republic of Iran) Persepolis
14	MF	Saman Ghoddos	6 September 1993 (aged 32)	68	3	(United Arab Emirates Football Association) Kalba
15	MF	Rouzbeh Cheshmi	24 July 1993 (aged 32)	40	3	(Football Federation Islamic Republic of Iran) Esteghlal
16	MF	Mahdi Torabi	10 September 1994 (aged 31)	52	7	(Football Federation Islamic Republic of Iran) Tractor
17	DF	Arya Yousefi	22 April 2002 (aged 24)	14	1	(Football Federation Islamic Republic of Iran) Sepahan
18	FW	Amirhossein Hosseinzadeh	30 October 2000 (aged 25)	18	5	(Football Federation Islamic Republic of Iran) Tractor
19	DF	Ali Nemati	8 February 1996 (aged 30)	18	0	(Football Federation Islamic Republic of Iran) Foolad
20	FW	Shahriyar Moghanlou	21 December 1994 (aged 31)	21	2	(United Arab Emirates Football Association) Kalba
21	MF	Mohammad Ghorbani	7 October 2001 (aged 24)	16	0	(United Arab Emirates Football Association) Al Wahda
22	GK	Hossein Hosseini	30 June 1992 (aged 33)	13	0	(Football Federation Islamic Republic of Iran) Sepahan
23	DF	Ramin Rezaeian	21 March 1990 (aged 36)	74	8	(Football Federation Islamic Republic of Iran) Foolad
24	FW	Dennis Eckert	9 January 1997 (aged 29)	0	0	(Royal Belgian Football Association) Standard Liège
25	DF	Danial Eiri	26 October 2003 (aged 22)	0	0	(Football Federation Islamic Republic of Iran) Malavan
26	MF	Amirmohammad Razzaghinia	11 April 2006 (aged 20)	4	0	(Football Federation Islamic Republic of Iran) Esteghlal

=== New Zealand ===
Coach: (England) Darren Bazeley

New Zealand announced their final squad on May 14. Matthew Garbett withdrew injured with a hamstring injury and was replaced by Logan Rogerson on June 15.

No.	Pos.	Player	Date of birth (age)	Caps	Goals	Club
1	GK	Max Crocombe	12 August 1993 (aged 32)	24	0	(The Football Association) Millwall
2	DF	Tim Payne	10 January 1994 (aged 32)	51	3	(New Zealand Football) Wellington Phoenix
3	DF	Francis de Vries	28 November 1994 (aged 31)	20	1	(New Zealand Football) Auckland FC
4	DF	Tyler Bindon	27 January 2005 (aged 21)	25	3	(The Football Association) Sheffield United
5	DF	Michael Boxall	18 August 1988 (aged 37)	63	1	(United States Soccer Federation) Minnesota United FC
6	MF	Joe Bell	27 April 1999 (aged 27)	32	1	(Norwegian Football Federation) Viking
7	FW	Logan Rogerson	28 May 1998 (aged 28)	18	2	(New Zealand Football) Auckland FC
8	MF	Marko Stamenić	19 February 2002 (aged 24)	39	3	(Football Association of Wales) Swansea City
9	FW	Chris Wood (captain)	7 December 1991 (aged 34)	90	45	(The Football Association) Nottingham Forest
10	MF	Sarpreet Singh	20 February 1999 (aged 27)	28	3	(New Zealand Football) Wellington Phoenix
11	MF	Elijah Just	1 May 2000 (aged 26)	44	9	(Scottish Football Association) Motherwell
12	GK	Alex Paulsen	4 July 2002 (aged 23)	8	0	(Polish Football Association) Lechia Gdańsk
13	DF	Liberato Cacace	27 September 2000 (aged 25)	37	1	(Football Association of Wales) Wrexham
14	MF	Alex Rufer	12 June 1996 (aged 29)	26	0	(New Zealand Football) Wellington Phoenix
15	DF	Nando Pijnaker	25 February 1999 (aged 27)	25	0	(New Zealand Football) Auckland FC
16	DF	Finn Surman	23 September 2003 (aged 22)	19	2	(United States Soccer Federation) Portland Timbers
17	FW	Kosta Barbarouses	19 February 1990 (aged 36)	76	10	(Football Australia) Western Sydney Wanderers
18	FW	Ben Waine	11 June 2001 (aged 25)	31	9	(The Football Association) Port Vale
19	MF	Ben Old	13 August 2002 (aged 23)	24	2	(French Football Federation) Saint-Étienne
20	MF	Callum McCowatt	30 April 1999 (aged 27)	32	4	(Danish Football Association) Silkeborg
21	FW	Jesse Randall	19 August 2002 (aged 23)	11	2	(New Zealand Football) Auckland FC
22	GK	Michael Woud	16 January 1999 (aged 27)	6	0	(New Zealand Football) Auckland FC
23	MF	Ryan Thomas	20 December 1994 (aged 31)	25	3	(Royal Dutch Football Association) PEC Zwolle
24	DF	Callan Elliot	7 July 1999 (aged 26)	11	0	(New Zealand Football) Auckland FC
25	MF	Lachlan Bayliss	24 July 2002 (aged 23)	4	0	(Football Australia) Newcastle Jets
26	DF	Tommy Smith	31 March 1990 (aged 36)	56	2	(The Football Association) Braintree Town

== Group H ==
=== Cape Verde ===
Coach: Bubista

Cape Verde announced their final squad on May 18.

No.	Pos.	Player	Date of birth (age)	Caps	Goals	Club
1	GK	Vozinha	3 June 1986 (aged 40)	90	0	(Portuguese Football Federation) Chaves
2	DF	Stopira	20 May 1988 (aged 38)	61	4	(Portuguese Football Federation) Torreense
3	DF	Diney	17 January 1995 (aged 31)	32	2	(United Arab Emirates Football Association) Al Bataeh
4	DF	Pico	17 June 1992 (aged 33)	45	0	(Football Association of Ireland) Shamrock Rovers
5	DF	Logan Costa	1 April 2001 (aged 25)	28	0	(Royal Spanish Football Federation) Villarreal
6	MF	Kevin Pina	27 January 1997 (aged 29)	31	3	(Russian Football Union) Krasnodar
7	MF	Jovane Cabral	14 June 1998 (aged 27)	29	3	(Portuguese Football Federation) Estrela Amadora
8	MF	João Paulo	26 May 1998 (aged 28)	41	1	(Romanian Football Federation) FCSB
9	FW	Gilson Benchimol	29 December 2001 (aged 24)	21	6	(Russian Football Union) Akron Tolyatti
10	MF	Jamiro Monteiro	23 November 1993 (aged 32)	55	5	(Royal Dutch Football Association) PEC Zwolle
11	MF	Garry Rodrigues	27 November 1990 (aged 35)	61	10	(Cyprus Football Association) Apollon Limassol
12	GK	Márcio Rosa	23 February 1997 (aged 29)	11	0	(Bulgarian Football Union) Montana
13	DF	Sidny Lopes Cabral	18 September 2002 (aged 23)	11	3	(Portuguese Football Federation) Benfica
14	MF	Deroy Duarte	4 July 1999 (aged 26)	33	0	(Bulgarian Football Union) Ludogorets Razgrad
15	MF	Laros Duarte	28 February 1997 (aged 29)	20	1	(Hungarian Football Federation) Puskás Akadémia
16	MF	Yannick Semedo	29 December 1995 (aged 30)	11	1	(Portuguese Football Federation) Farense
17	MF	Willy Semedo	27 April 1994 (aged 32)	38	3	(Cyprus Football Association) Omonia
18	MF	Telmo Arcanjo	21 June 2001 (aged 24)	16	1	(Portuguese Football Federation) Vitória de Guimarães
19	FW	Dailon Livramento	4 May 2001 (aged 25)	22	7	(Portuguese Football Federation) Casa Pia
20	FW	Ryan Mendes (captain)	8 January 1990 (aged 36)	96	22	(Turkish Football Federation) Iğdır
21	MF	Nuno da Costa	10 February 1991 (aged 35)	9	2	(Turkish Football Federation) İstanbul Başakşehir
22	DF	Steven Moreira	13 August 1994 (aged 31)	20	0	(United States Soccer Federation) Columbus Crew
23	GK	CJ dos Santos	24 August 2000 (aged 25)	1	0	(United States Soccer Federation) San Diego FC
24	DF	Wagner Pina	3 November 2002 (aged 23)	14	0	(Turkish Football Federation) Trabzonspor
25	DF	Kelvin Pires	5 June 2000 (aged 26)	6	1	(Football Association of Finland) SJK
26	MF	Hélio Varela	3 May 2002 (aged 24)	21	0	(Israel Football Association) Maccabi Tel Aviv

=== Saudi Arabia ===
Coach: (Greece) Georgios Donis

Saudi Arabia announced a 30-man preliminary squad on May 23. They announced their final squad on May 31.

No.	Pos.	Player	Date of birth (age)	Caps	Goals	Club
1	GK	Nawaf Al-Aqidi	10 May 2000 (aged 26)	24	0	(Saudi Arabian Football Federation) Al-Nassr
2	DF	Ali Majrashi	2 October 1999 (aged 26)	21	0	(Saudi Arabian Football Federation) Al-Ahli
3	DF	Ali Lajami	24 April 1996 (aged 30)	24	1	(Saudi Arabian Football Federation) Al-Hilal
4	DF	Abdulelah Al-Amri	15 January 1997 (aged 29)	44	1	(Saudi Arabian Football Federation) Al-Nassr
5	DF	Hassan Al-Tambakti	9 February 1999 (aged 27)	54	1	(Saudi Arabian Football Federation) Al-Hilal
6	MF	Nasser Al-Dawsari	19 December 1998 (aged 27)	47	1	(Saudi Arabian Football Federation) Al-Hilal
7	MF	Musab Al-Juwayr	20 June 2003 (aged 22)	37	6	(Saudi Arabian Football Federation) Al-Qadsiah
8	FW	Ayman Yahya	14 May 2001 (aged 25)	26	0	(Saudi Arabian Football Federation) Al-Nassr
9	FW	Firas Al-Buraikan	14 May 2000 (aged 26)	72	16	(Saudi Arabian Football Federation) Al-Ahli
10	FW	Salem Al-Dawsari (captain)	19 August 1991 (aged 34)	111	27	(Saudi Arabian Football Federation) Al-Hilal
11	FW	Saleh Al-Shehri	1 November 1993 (aged 32)	59	17	(Saudi Arabian Football Federation) Al-Ittihad
12	DF	Saud Abdulhamid	18 July 1999 (aged 26)	55	1	(French Football Federation) Lens
13	DF	Nawaf Boushal	16 September 1999 (aged 26)	27	0	(Saudi Arabian Football Federation) Al-Nassr
14	DF	Hassan Kadesh	26 September 1992 (aged 33)	21	2	(Saudi Arabian Football Federation) Al-Ittihad
15	MF	Abdullah Al-Khaibari	16 August 1996 (aged 29)	42	0	(Saudi Arabian Football Federation) Al-Nassr
16	MF	Ziyad Al-Johani	11 November 2001 (aged 24)	12	0	(Saudi Arabian Football Federation) Al-Ahli
17	FW	Khalid Al-Ghannam	8 November 2000 (aged 25)	7	0	(Saudi Arabian Football Federation) Al-Ettifaq
18	MF	Alaa Al-Hejji	3 December 1995 (aged 30)	3	0	(Saudi Arabian Football Federation) Neom
19	FW	Abdullah Al-Hamdan	13 September 1999 (aged 26)	52	13	(Saudi Arabian Football Federation) Al-Nassr
20	FW	Sultan Mandash	17 October 1994 (aged 31)	7	2	(Saudi Arabian Football Federation) Al-Hilal
21	GK	Mohammed Al-Owais	10 October 1991 (aged 34)	65	0	(Saudi Arabian Football Federation) Al-Ula
22	GK	Ahmed Al-Kassar	8 May 1991 (aged 35)	9	0	(Saudi Arabian Football Federation) Al-Qadsiah
23	MF	Mohamed Kanno	22 September 1994 (aged 31)	79	8	(Saudi Arabian Football Federation) Al-Hilal
24	DF	Moteb Al-Harbi	20 February 2000 (aged 26)	13	0	(Saudi Arabian Football Federation) Al-Hilal
25	DF	Jehad Thakri	21 July 2001 (aged 24)	8	0	(Saudi Arabian Football Federation) Al-Qadsiah
26	DF	Mohammed Abu Al-Shamat	11 August 2002 (aged 23)	8	0	(Saudi Arabian Football Federation) Al-Qadsiah

=== Spain ===
Coach: Luis de la Fuente

Spain announced their final squad on May 25. With the omission of Dean Huijsen and Dani Carvajal, there were no Real Madrid players in the Spain squad for the first time in the World Cup and only the second time in a major tournament.

No.	Pos.	Player	Date of birth (age)	Caps	Goals	Club
1	GK	David Raya	15 September 1995 (aged 30)	13	0	(The Football Association) Arsenal
2	DF	Marc Pubill	20 June 2003 (aged 22)	2	0	(Royal Spanish Football Federation) Atlético Madrid
3	DF	Álex Grimaldo	20 September 1995 (aged 30)	14	0	(German Football Association) Bayer Leverkusen
4	DF	Eric García	9 January 2001 (aged 25)	21	0	(Royal Spanish Football Federation) Barcelona
5	DF	Marcos Llorente	30 January 1995 (aged 31)	24	0	(Royal Spanish Football Federation) Atlético Madrid
6	MF	Mikel Merino	22 June 1996 (aged 29)	43	10	(The Football Association) Arsenal
7	FW	Ferran Torres	29 February 2000 (aged 26)	57	24	(Royal Spanish Football Federation) Barcelona
8	MF	Fabián Ruiz	3 April 1996 (aged 30)	42	6	(French Football Federation) Paris Saint-Germain
9	MF	Gavi	5 August 2004 (aged 21)	30	5	(Royal Spanish Football Federation) Barcelona
10	FW	Dani Olmo	7 May 1998 (aged 28)	50	12	(Royal Spanish Football Federation) Barcelona
11	FW	Yéremy Pino	20 October 2002 (aged 23)	23	4	(The Football Association) Crystal Palace
12	DF	Pedro Porro	13 September 1999 (aged 26)	18	0	(The Football Association) Tottenham Hotspur
13	GK	Joan Garcia	4 May 2001 (aged 25)	2	0	(Royal Spanish Football Federation) Barcelona
14	DF	Aymeric Laporte	27 May 1994 (aged 32)	46	2	(Royal Spanish Football Federation) Athletic Bilbao
15	MF	Álex Baena	20 July 2001 (aged 24)	17	2	(Royal Spanish Football Federation) Atlético Madrid
16	MF	Rodri (Captain)	22 June 1996 (aged 29)	62	4	(The Football Association) Manchester City
17	FW	Nico Williams	12 July 2002 (aged 23)	30	6	(Royal Spanish Football Federation) Athletic Bilbao
18	MF	Martín Zubimendi	2 February 1999 (aged 27)	26	3	(The Football Association) Arsenal
19	FW	Lamine Yamal	13 July 2007 (aged 18)	25	6	(Royal Spanish Football Federation) Barcelona
20	MF	Pedri	25 November 2002 (aged 23)	41	6	(Royal Spanish Football Federation) Barcelona
21	FW	Mikel Oyarzabal	21 April 1997 (aged 29)	53	25	(Royal Spanish Football Federation) Real Sociedad
22	DF	Pau Cubarsí	22 January 2007 (aged 19)	12	0	(Royal Spanish Football Federation) Barcelona
23	GK	Unai Simón	11 June 1997 (aged 29)	58	0	(Royal Spanish Football Federation) Athletic Bilbao
24	DF	Marc Cucurella	22 July 1998 (aged 27)	24	1	(The Football Association) Chelsea
25	FW	Víctor Muñoz	13 July 2003 (aged 22)	2	1	(Royal Spanish Football Federation) Osasuna
26	FW	Borja Iglesias	17 January 1993 (aged 33)	8	0	(Royal Spanish Football Federation) Celta Vigo

=== Uruguay ===
Coach: (Argentina) Marcelo Bielsa

Uruguay announced their final squad on May 31.

No.	Pos.	Player	Date of birth (age)	Caps	Goals	Club
1	GK	Sergio Rochet	23 March 1993 (aged 33)	35	0	(Brazilian Football Confederation) Internacional
2	DF	José María Giménez (captain)	20 January 1995 (aged 31)	99	8	(Royal Spanish Football Federation) Atlético Madrid
3	DF	Sebastián Cáceres	18 August 1999 (aged 26)	24	0	(Mexican Football Federation) América
4	DF	Ronald Araújo	7 March 1999 (aged 27)	27	1	(Royal Spanish Football Federation) Barcelona
5	MF	Manuel Ugarte	11 April 2001 (aged 25)	36	1	(The Football Association) Manchester United
6	MF	Rodrigo Bentancur	25 June 1997 (aged 28)	74	3	(The Football Association) Tottenham Hotspur
7	MF	Nicolás de la Cruz	1 June 1997 (aged 29)	34	5	(Brazilian Football Confederation) Flamengo
8	MF	Federico Valverde	22 July 1998 (aged 27)	73	9	(Royal Spanish Football Federation) Real Madrid
9	FW	Darwin Núñez	24 June 1999 (aged 26)	38	13	(Saudi Arabian Football Federation) Al-Hilal
10	MF	Giorgian de Arrascaeta	1 June 1994 (aged 32)	60	13	(Brazilian Football Confederation) Flamengo
11	FW	Facundo Pellistri	20 December 2001 (aged 24)	39	2	(Hellenic Football Federation) Panathinaikos
12	GK	Santiago Mele	6 September 1997 (aged 28)	8	0	(Mexican Football Federation) Monterrey
13	DF	Guillermo Varela	24 March 1993 (aged 33)	28	0	(Brazilian Football Confederation) Flamengo
14	MF	Agustín Canobbio	1 October 1998 (aged 27)	15	1	(Brazilian Football Confederation) Fluminense
15	MF	Emiliano Martínez	17 August 1999 (aged 26)	10	0	(Brazilian Football Confederation) Palmeiras
16	DF	Mathías Olivera	31 October 1997 (aged 28)	35	2	(Italian Football Federation) Napoli
17	DF	Matías Viña	9 November 1997 (aged 28)	43	1	(Argentine Football Association) River Plate
18	FW	Brian Rodríguez	20 May 2000 (aged 26)	32	4	(Mexican Football Federation) América
19	FW	Rodrigo Aguirre	1 October 1994 (aged 31)	10	3	(Mexican Football Federation) Tigres UANL
20	MF	Maximiliano Araújo	15 February 2000 (aged 26)	28	3	(Portuguese Football Federation) Sporting CP
21	FW	Federico Viñas	30 June 1998 (aged 27)	11	2	(Royal Spanish Football Federation) Oviedo
22	MF	Joaquín Piquerez	24 August 1998 (aged 27)	19	0	(Brazilian Football Confederation) Palmeiras
23	GK	Fernando Muslera	16 June 1986 (aged 39)	134	0	(Argentine Football Association) Estudiantes
24	DF	Santiago Bueno	9 November 1998 (aged 27)	8	0	(The Football Association) Wolverhampton Wanderers
25	MF	Juan Manuel Sanabria	29 March 2000 (aged 26)	5	1	(United States Soccer Federation) Real Salt Lake
26	MF	Rodrigo Zalazar	12 August 1999 (aged 26)	8	2	(Portuguese Football Federation) Braga

== Group I ==
=== France ===
Coach: Didier Deschamps

France announced their final squad on May 14.

No.	Pos.	Player	Date of birth (age)	Caps	Goals	Club
1	GK	Brice Samba	25 April 1994 (aged 32)	4	0	(French Football Federation) Rennes
2	DF	Malo Gusto	19 May 2003 (aged 23)	11	0	(The Football Association) Chelsea
3	DF	Lucas Digne	20 July 1993 (aged 32)	58	0	(The Football Association) Aston Villa
4	DF	Dayot Upamecano	27 October 1998 (aged 27)	38	2	(German Football Association) Bayern Munich
5	DF	Jules Koundé	12 November 1998 (aged 27)	48	0	(Royal Spanish Football Federation) Barcelona
6	MF	Manu Koné	17 May 2001 (aged 25)	14	0	(Italian Football Federation) Roma
7	FW	Ousmane Dembélé	15 May 1997 (aged 29)	59	7	(French Football Federation) Paris Saint-Germain
8	MF	Aurélien Tchouaméni	27 January 2000 (aged 26)	46	3	(Royal Spanish Football Federation) Real Madrid
9	FW	Marcus Thuram	6 August 1997 (aged 28)	34	3	(Italian Football Federation) Inter Milan
10	FW	Kylian Mbappé (captain)	20 December 1998 (aged 27)	98	56	(Royal Spanish Football Federation) Real Madrid
11	FW	Michael Olise	12 December 2001 (aged 24)	17	7	(German Football Association) Bayern Munich
12	FW	Bradley Barcola	2 September 2002 (aged 23)	20	3	(French Football Federation) Paris Saint-Germain
13	MF	N'Golo Kanté	29 March 1991 (aged 35)	69	2	(Turkish Football Federation) Fenerbahçe
14	MF	Adrien Rabiot	3 April 1995 (aged 31)	59	7	(Italian Football Federation) AC Milan
15	DF	Ibrahima Konaté	25 May 1999 (aged 27)	28	0	(The Football Association) Liverpool
16	GK	Mike Maignan	3 July 1995 (aged 30)	40	0	(Italian Football Federation) AC Milan
17	DF	William Saliba	24 March 2001 (aged 25)	32	0	(The Football Association) Arsenal
18	MF	Warren Zaïre-Emery	8 March 2006 (aged 20)	11	1	(French Football Federation) Paris Saint-Germain
19	DF	Théo Hernandez	6 October 1997 (aged 28)	44	2	(Saudi Arabian Football Federation) Al-Hilal
20	FW	Désiré Doué	3 June 2005 (aged 21)	7	2	(French Football Federation) Paris Saint-Germain
21	DF	Lucas Hernandez	14 February 1996 (aged 30)	42	0	(French Football Federation) Paris Saint-Germain
22	FW	Jean-Philippe Mateta	28 June 1997 (aged 28)	4	2	(The Football Association) Crystal Palace
23	GK	Robin Risser	2 December 2004 (aged 21)	0	0	(French Football Federation) Lens
24	MF	Rayan Cherki	17 August 2003 (aged 22)	7	2	(The Football Association) Manchester City
25	MF	Maghnes Akliouche	25 February 2002 (aged 24)	9	1	(French Football Federation) Monaco
26	DF	Maxence Lacroix	6 April 2000 (aged 26)	4	0	(The Football Association) Crystal Palace

=== Iraq ===
Coach: (Australia) Graham Arnold

Iraq announced a 34-man preliminary squad on May 19. They announced their final squad on June 1. Ahmed Yahya withdrew injured with a hamstring injury and was replaced by Ahmed Maknzi on June 6.

No.	Pos.	Player	Date of birth (age)	Caps	Goals	Club
1	GK	Fahad Talib	21 October 1994 (aged 31)	21	0	(Iraq Football Association) Al-Talaba
2	DF	Rebin Sulaka	12 April 1992 (aged 34)	56	1	(Football Association of Thailand) Port
3	DF	Hussein Ali	1 March 2002 (aged 24)	27	1	(Polish Football Association) Pogoń Szczecin
4	DF	Zaid Tahseen	29 January 2001 (aged 25)	28	1	(Uzbekistan Football Association) Pakhtakor
5	DF	Akam Hashim	16 August 1998 (aged 27)	14	1	(Iraq Football Association) Al-Zawraa
6	DF	Manaf Younis	16 November 1996 (aged 29)	34	1	(Iraq Football Association) Al-Shorta
7	MF	Youssef Amyn	21 August 2003 (aged 22)	27	2	(Cyprus Football Association) AEK Larnaca
8	MF	Ibrahim Bayesh	1 May 2000 (aged 26)	76	8	(United Arab Emirates Football Association) Al Dhafra
9	FW	Ali Al-Hamadi	1 March 2002 (aged 24)	20	5	(The Football Association) Luton Town
10	FW	Mohanad Ali	20 June 2000 (aged 25)	72	27	(United Arab Emirates Football Association) Dibba
11	FW	Ahmed Qasem	12 July 2003 (aged 22)	3	0	(United States Soccer Federation) Nashville SC
12	GK	Jalal Hassan (captain)	18 May 1991 (aged 35)	102	0	(Iraq Football Association) Al-Zawraa
13	FW	Ali Yousif	19 January 1996 (aged 30)	7	1	(Iraq Football Association) Al-Talaba
14	MF	Zidane Iqbal	27 April 2003 (aged 23)	25	2	(Royal Dutch Football Association) Utrecht
15	DF	Ahmed Maknzi	24 September 2001 (aged 24)	7	0	(Iraq Football Association) Al-Karma
16	MF	Amir Al-Ammari	27 July 1997 (aged 28)	51	3	(Polish Football Association) Cracovia
17	FW	Ali Jasim	20 January 2004 (aged 22)	36	2	(Saudi Arabian Football Federation) Al-Najma
18	FW	Aymen Hussein	22 March 1996 (aged 30)	95	33	(Iraq Football Association) Al-Karma
19	MF	Kevin Yakob	10 October 2000 (aged 25)	9	0	(Danish Football Association) AGF
20	MF	Aimar Sher	20 December 2002 (aged 23)	7	0	(Norwegian Football Federation) Sarpsborg 08
21	FW	Marko Farji	16 March 2004 (aged 22)	12	0	(Italian Football Federation) Venezia
22	GK	Ahmed Basil	19 August 1996 (aged 29)	16	0	(Iraq Football Association) Al-Shorta
23	DF	Merchas Doski	7 December 1999 (aged 26)	31	1	(Football Association of the Czech Republic) Viktoria Plzeň
24	MF	Zaid Ismail	3 January 2002 (aged 24)	6	0	(Iraq Football Association) Al-Talaba
25	DF	Mustafa Saadoon	25 May 2001 (aged 25)	17	0	(Iraq Football Association) Al-Shorta
26	DF	Frans Putros	14 July 1993 (aged 32)	28	0	(Football Association of Indonesia) Persib

=== Norway ===
Coach: Ståle Solbakken

Norway announced their final squad on May 21.

No.	Pos.	Player	Date of birth (age)	Caps	Goals	Club
1	GK	Ørjan Nyland	10 September 1990 (aged 35)	71	0	(Royal Spanish Football Federation) Sevilla
2	MF	Morten Thorsby	5 May 1996 (aged 30)	31	0	(Italian Football Federation) Cremonese
3	DF	Kristoffer Ajer	17 April 1998 (aged 28)	52	2	(The Football Association) Brentford
4	DF	Leo Østigård	28 November 1999 (aged 26)	38	1	(Italian Football Federation) Genoa
5	DF	David Møller Wolfe	23 April 2002 (aged 24)	22	1	(The Football Association) Wolverhampton Wanderers
6	MF	Patrick Berg	24 November 1997 (aged 28)	43	0	(Norwegian Football Federation) Bodø/Glimt
7	FW	Alexander Sørloth	5 December 1995 (aged 30)	72	26	(Royal Spanish Football Federation) Atlético Madrid
8	MF	Sander Berge	14 February 1998 (aged 28)	66	1	(The Football Association) Fulham
9	FW	Erling Haaland	21 July 2000 (aged 25)	50	55	(The Football Association) Manchester City
10	MF	Martin Ødegaard (captain)	17 December 1998 (aged 27)	68	5	(The Football Association) Arsenal
11	FW	Jørgen Strand Larsen	6 February 2000 (aged 26)	28	6	(The Football Association) Crystal Palace
12	GK	Sander Tangvik	29 November 2002 (aged 23)	0	0	(German Football Association) Hamburger SV
13	GK	Egil Selvik	30 July 1997 (aged 28)	7	0	(The Football Association) Watford
14	MF	Fredrik Aursnes	10 December 1995 (aged 30)	22	1	(Portuguese Football Federation) Benfica
15	DF	Fredrik André Bjørkan	21 August 1998 (aged 27)	21	1	(Norwegian Football Federation) Bodø/Glimt
16	DF	Marcus Holmgren Pedersen	16 July 2000 (aged 25)	32	0	(Italian Football Federation) Torino
17	DF	Torbjørn Heggem	12 January 1999 (aged 27)	15	0	(Italian Football Federation) Bologna
18	MF	Kristian Thorstvedt	13 March 1999 (aged 27)	37	4	(Italian Football Federation) Sassuolo
19	MF	Thelo Aasgaard	2 May 2002 (aged 24)	8	5	(Scottish Football Association) Rangers
20	MF	Antonio Nusa	17 April 2005 (aged 21)	24	8	(German Football Association) RB Leipzig
21	MF	Andreas Schjelderup	1 June 2004 (aged 22)	12	1	(Portuguese Football Federation) Benfica
22	MF	Oscar Bobb	12 July 2003 (aged 22)	20	2	(The Football Association) Fulham
23	MF	Jens Petter Hauge	12 October 1999 (aged 26)	15	1	(Norwegian Football Federation) Bodø/Glimt
24	DF	Sondre Langås	2 February 2001 (aged 25)	3	0	(The Football Association) Derby County
25	DF	Henrik Falchener	8 May 2003 (aged 23)	1	0	(Norwegian Football Federation) Viking
26	DF	Julian Ryerson	17 November 1997 (aged 28)	43	1	(German Football Association) Borussia Dortmund

=== Senegal ===
Coach: Pape Thiaw

Senegal announced a 28-man preliminary squad on May 21. They announced their final squad on June 1.

No.	Pos.	Player	Date of birth (age)	Caps	Goals	Club
1	GK	Yehvann Diouf	16 November 1999 (aged 26)	2	0	(French Football Federation) Nice
2	DF	Mamadou Sarr	29 August 2005 (aged 20)	8	0	(The Football Association) Chelsea
3	DF	Kalidou Koulibaly (captain)	20 June 1991 (aged 34)	104	2	(Saudi Arabian Football Federation) Al-Hilal
4	DF	Abdoulaye Seck	4 June 1992 (aged 34)	25	4	(Israel Football Association) Maccabi Haifa
5	MF	Idrissa Gueye	26 September 1989 (aged 36)	132	7	(The Football Association) Everton
6	MF	Pathé Ciss	16 March 1994 (aged 32)	30	0	(Royal Spanish Football Federation) Rayo Vallecano
7	FW	Assane Diao	7 September 2005 (aged 20)	5	0	(Italian Football Federation) Como
8	MF	Lamine Camara	1 January 2004 (aged 22)	45	7	(French Football Federation) Monaco
9	FW	Bamba Dieng	23 March 2000 (aged 26)	23	2	(French Football Federation) Lorient
10	FW	Sadio Mané	10 April 1992 (aged 34)	128	55	(Saudi Arabian Football Federation) Al-Nassr
11	FW	Nicolas Jackson	20 June 2001 (aged 24)	33	8	(German Football Association) Bayern Munich
12	FW	Cherif Ndiaye	23 January 1996 (aged 30)	19	4	(Turkish Football Federation) Samsunspor
13	FW	Iliman Ndiaye	6 March 2000 (aged 26)	41	4	(The Football Association) Everton
14	DF	Ismail Jakobs	17 August 1999 (aged 26)	31	0	(Turkish Football Federation) Galatasaray
15	DF	Krépin Diatta	25 February 1999 (aged 27)	62	2	(French Football Federation) Monaco
16	GK	Édouard Mendy	1 March 1992 (aged 34)	58	0	(Saudi Arabian Football Federation) Al-Ahli
17	MF	Pape Matar Sarr	14 September 2002 (aged 23)	40	4	(The Football Association) Tottenham Hotspur
18	FW	Ismaïla Sarr	25 February 1998 (aged 28)	84	19	(The Football Association) Crystal Palace
19	DF	Moussa Niakhaté	8 March 1996 (aged 30)	32	0	(French Football Federation) Lyon
20	FW	Ibrahim Mbaye	24 January 2008 (aged 18)	11	3	(French Football Federation) Paris Saint-Germain
21	MF	Habib Diarra	3 January 2004 (aged 22)	21	4	(The Football Association) Sunderland
22	MF	Bara Sapoko Ndiaye	31 December 2007 (aged 18)	1	0	(German Football Association) Bayern Munich
23	GK	Mory Diaw	22 June 1993 (aged 32)	5	0	(French Football Federation) Le Havre
24	DF	Antoine Mendy	27 May 2004 (aged 22)	7	0	(French Football Federation) Nice
25	DF	El Hadji Malick Diouf	29 December 2004 (aged 21)	20	1	(The Football Association) West Ham United
26	MF	Pape Gueye	24 January 1999 (aged 27)	42	5	(Royal Spanish Football Federation) Villarreal

== Group J ==
=== Algeria ===
Coach: (Bosnia and Herzegovina) Vladimir Petković

Algeria announced their final squad on May 31.

No.	Pos.	Player	Date of birth (age)	Caps	Goals	Club
1	GK	Melvin Mastil	19 February 2000 (aged 26)	2	0	(Swiss Football Association) Stade Nyonnais
2	DF	Aïssa Mandi	22 October 1991 (aged 34)	119	8	(French Football Federation) Lille
3	DF	Achref Abada	15 June 1999 (aged 26)	9	1	(Algerian Football Federation) USM Alger
4	DF	Mohamed Amine Tougai	22 January 2000 (aged 26)	30	2	(Tunisian Football Federation) Espérance de Tunis
5	DF	Zineddine Belaïd	20 March 1999 (aged 27)	18	1	(Algerian Football Federation) JS Kabylie
6	MF	Ramiz Zerrouki	26 May 1998 (aged 28)	53	3	(Royal Dutch Football Association) Twente
7	FW	Riyad Mahrez (captain)	21 February 1991 (aged 35)	116	38	(Saudi Arabian Football Federation) Al-Ahli
8	MF	Houssem Aouar	30 June 1998 (aged 27)	22	6	(Saudi Arabian Football Federation) Al-Ittihad
9	FW	Amine Gouiri	16 February 2000 (aged 26)	23	10	(French Football Federation) Marseille
10	MF	Farès Chaïbi	28 November 2002 (aged 23)	31	3	(German Football Association) Eintracht Frankfurt
11	FW	Anis Hadj Moussa	11 February 2002 (aged 24)	15	2	(Royal Dutch Football Association) Feyenoord
12	FW	Nadhir Benbouali	17 April 2000 (aged 26)	4	1	(Hungarian Football Federation) Győri ETO
13	DF	Jaouen Hadjam	26 March 2003 (aged 23)	18	3	(Swiss Football Association) Young Boys
14	MF	Hicham Boudaoui	23 September 1999 (aged 26)	34	0	(French Football Federation) Nice
15	DF	Rayan Aït-Nouri	6 June 2001 (aged 25)	30	0	(The Football Association) Manchester City
16	GK	Oussama Benbot	11 October 1994 (aged 31)	5	0	(Algerian Football Federation) USM Alger
17	DF	Rafik Belghali	7 June 2002 (aged 24)	13	1	(Italian Football Federation) Hellas Verona
18	FW	Mohamed Amoura	9 May 2000 (aged 26)	47	19	(German Football Association) VfL Wolfsburg
19	MF	Nabil Bentaleb	24 November 1994 (aged 31)	60	6	(French Football Federation) Lille
20	FW	Adil Boulbina	2 May 2003 (aged 23)	12	6	(Qatar Football Association) Al-Duhail
21	DF	Ramy Bensebaini	16 April 1995 (aged 31)	82	9	(German Football Association) Borussia Dortmund
22	MF	Ibrahim Maza	24 November 2005 (aged 20)	17	2	(German Football Association) Bayer Leverkusen
23	GK	Luca Zidane	13 May 1998 (aged 28)	7	0	(Royal Spanish Football Federation) Granada
24	MF	Yacine Titraoui	26 July 2003 (aged 22)	5	0	(Royal Belgian Football Association) Charleroi
25	FW	Farès Ghedjemis	6 September 2002 (aged 23)	1	1	(Italian Football Federation) Frosinone
26	DF	Samir Chergui	6 February 1999 (aged 27)	5	0	(French Football Federation) Paris FC

=== Argentina ===
Coach: Lionel Scaloni

Argentina announced a 55-man preliminary squad on May 11. They announced their final squad on May 28. Leonardo Balerdi withdrew due to a calf injury on June 6 and was replaced by Marcos Senesi on June 11.

No.	Pos.	Player	Date of birth (age)	Caps	Goals	Club
1	GK	Juan Musso	6 May 1994 (aged 32)	4	0	(Royal Spanish Football Federation) Atlético Madrid
2	DF	Marcos Senesi	10 May 1997 (aged 29)	3	0	(The Football Association) Bournemouth
3	DF	Nicolás Tagliafico	31 August 1992 (aged 33)	76	1	(French Football Federation) Lyon
4	DF	Gonzalo Montiel	1 January 1997 (aged 29)	39	2	(Argentine Football Association) River Plate
5	MF	Leandro Paredes	29 June 1994 (aged 31)	77	5	(Argentine Football Association) Boca Juniors
6	DF	Lisandro Martínez	18 January 1998 (aged 28)	28	1	(The Football Association) Manchester United
7	MF	Rodrigo De Paul	24 May 1994 (aged 32)	87	2	(United States Soccer Federation) Inter Miami CF
8	MF	Valentín Barco	23 July 2004 (aged 21)	4	2	(French Football Federation) Strasbourg
9	FW	Julián Alvarez	31 January 2000 (aged 26)	51	14	(Royal Spanish Football Federation) Atlético Madrid
10	FW	Lionel Messi (captain)	24 June 1987 (aged 38)	199	117	(United States Soccer Federation) Inter Miami CF
11	MF	Giovani Lo Celso	9 April 1996 (aged 30)	67	4	(Royal Spanish Football Federation) Real Betis
12	GK	Gerónimo Rulli	20 May 1992 (aged 34)	8	0	(French Football Federation) Marseille
13	DF	Cristian Romero	27 April 1998 (aged 28)	51	3	(The Football Association) Tottenham Hotspur
14	MF	Exequiel Palacios	5 October 1998 (aged 27)	40	0	(German Football Association) Bayer Leverkusen
15	MF	Nicolás González	6 April 1998 (aged 28)	51	6	(Royal Spanish Football Federation) Atlético Madrid
16	FW	Thiago Almada	26 April 2001 (aged 25)	16	5	(Royal Spanish Football Federation) Atlético Madrid
17	FW	Giuliano Simeone	18 December 2002 (aged 23)	13	2	(Royal Spanish Football Federation) Atlético Madrid
18	FW	Nico Paz	8 September 2004 (aged 21)	9	1	(Italian Football Federation) Como
19	DF	Nicolás Otamendi	12 February 1988 (aged 38)	132	8	(Portuguese Football Federation) Benfica
20	MF	Alexis Mac Allister	24 December 1998 (aged 27)	46	6	(The Football Association) Liverpool
21	FW	José Manuel López	6 December 2000 (aged 25)	5	0	(Brazilian Football Confederation) Palmeiras
22	FW	Lautaro Martínez	22 August 1997 (aged 28)	77	37	(Italian Football Federation) Inter Milan
23	GK	Emiliano Martínez	2 September 1992 (aged 33)	59	0	(The Football Association) Aston Villa
24	MF	Enzo Fernández	17 January 2001 (aged 25)	42	6	(The Football Association) Chelsea
25	DF	Facundo Medina	28 May 1999 (aged 27)	9	0	(French Football Federation) Marseille
26	DF	Nahuel Molina	6 April 1998 (aged 28)	58	1	(Royal Spanish Football Federation) Atlético Madrid

=== Austria ===
Coach: (Germany) Ralf Rangnick

Austria announced their final squad on May 18. Christoph Baumgartner withdrew injured on June 2 and was replaced by Dejan Ljubičić on June 10.

No.	Pos.	Player	Date of birth (age)	Caps	Goals	Club
1	GK	Alexander Schlager	1 February 1996 (aged 30)	26	0	(Austrian Football Association) Red Bull Salzburg
2	DF	David Affengruber	19 March 2001 (aged 25)	1	0	(Royal Spanish Football Federation) Elche
3	DF	Kevin Danso	19 September 1998 (aged 27)	32	0	(The Football Association) Tottenham Hotspur
4	MF	Xaver Schlager	28 September 1997 (aged 28)	51	4	(German Football Association) RB Leipzig
5	DF	Stefan Posch	14 May 1997 (aged 29)	52	5	(German Football Association) Mainz 05
6	MF	Nicolas Seiwald	4 May 2001 (aged 25)	47	1	(German Football Association) RB Leipzig
7	FW	Marko Arnautović	19 April 1989 (aged 37)	133	47	(Football Association of Serbia) Red Star Belgrade
8	DF	David Alaba (captain)	24 June 1992 (aged 33)	113	15	(Royal Spanish Football Federation) Real Madrid
9	MF	Marcel Sabitzer	17 March 1994 (aged 32)	98	26	(German Football Association) Borussia Dortmund
10	MF	Florian Grillitsch	7 August 1995 (aged 30)	58	1	(Portuguese Football Federation) Braga
11	FW	Michael Gregoritsch	18 April 1994 (aged 32)	75	24	(German Football Association) FC Augsburg
12	GK	Florian Wiegele	21 March 2001 (aged 25)	1	0	(Football Association of the Czech Republic) Viktoria Plzeň
13	GK	Patrick Pentz	2 January 1997 (aged 29)	18	0	(Danish Football Association) Brøndby
14	FW	Saša Kalajdžić	7 July 1997 (aged 28)	22	4	(Austrian Football Association) LASK
15	DF	Philipp Lienhart	11 July 1996 (aged 29)	41	3	(German Football Association) SC Freiburg
16	DF	Phillipp Mwene	29 January 1994 (aged 32)	30	0	(German Football Association) Mainz 05
17	MF	Carney Chukwuemeka	20 October 2003 (aged 22)	3	1	(German Football Association) Borussia Dortmund
18	MF	Romano Schmid	27 January 2000 (aged 26)	34	3	(German Football Association) Werder Bremen
19	MF	Dejan Ljubičić	8 October 1997 (aged 28)	9	1	(German Football Association) Schalke 04
20	MF	Konrad Laimer	27 May 1997 (aged 29)	57	7	(German Football Association) Bayern Munich
21	FW	Patrick Wimmer	30 May 2001 (aged 25)	30	1	(German Football Association) VfL Wolfsburg
22	MF	Alexander Prass	26 May 2001 (aged 25)	19	0	(German Football Association) TSG Hoffenheim
23	DF	Marco Friedl	16 March 1998 (aged 28)	11	0	(German Football Association) Werder Bremen
24	MF	Paul Wanner	23 December 2005 (aged 20)	3	0	(Royal Dutch Football Association) PSV Eindhoven
25	DF	Michael Svoboda	15 October 1998 (aged 27)	4	0	(Italian Football Federation) Venezia
26	MF	Alessandro Schöpf	7 February 1994 (aged 32)	35	6	(Austrian Football Association) Wolfsberger AC

=== Jordan ===
Coach: (Morocco) Jamal Sellami

Jordan announced a 30-man preliminary squad on May 17. The squad was reduced to 28 players on May 27. Their final squad was announced on June 2. Ibrahim Sabra withdrew injured on June 5 and was replaced by Mohammad Abu Ghoush on June 8.

No.	Pos.	Player	Date of birth (age)	Caps	Goals	Club
1	GK	Yazeed Abulaila	8 January 1993 (aged 33)	76	0	(Jordan Football Association) Al-Hussein
2	DF	Mohammad Abu Hashish	9 May 1995 (aged 31)	56	1	(Iraq Football Association) Al-Karma
3	DF	Abdallah Nasib	25 February 1994 (aged 32)	65	3	(Iraq Football Association) Al-Zawraa
4	DF	Husam Abu Dahab	13 May 2000 (aged 26)	18	0	(Jordan Football Association) Al-Faisaly
5	DF	Yazan Al-Arab	31 January 1996 (aged 30)	80	3	(Korea Football Association) FC Seoul
6	MF	Amer Jamous	3 July 2002 (aged 23)	19	1	(Iraq Football Association) Al-Zawraa
7	FW	Mohammad Abu Zrayq	30 December 1997 (aged 28)	41	5	(Royal Moroccan Football Federation) Raja Casablanca
8	MF	Noor Al-Rawabdeh	24 February 1997 (aged 29)	68	3	(Football Association of Malaysia) Selangor
9	FW	Ali Olwan	26 March 2000 (aged 26)	66	29	(Qatar Football Association) Al-Sailiya
10	FW	Musa Al-Taamari	10 June 1997 (aged 29)	92	24	(French Football Federation) Rennes
11	FW	Odeh Al-Fakhouri	22 November 2005 (aged 20)	10	1	(Egyptian Football Association) Pyramids
12	GK	Nour Bani Attiah	25 January 1993 (aged 33)	5	0	(Jordan Football Association) Al-Faisaly
13	FW	Mahmoud Al-Mardi	6 October 1993 (aged 32)	89	9	(Jordan Football Association) Al-Hussein
14	MF	Rajaei Ayed	25 July 1993 (aged 32)	72	0	(Jordan Football Association) Al-Hussein
15	MF	Ibrahim Sadeh	27 April 2000 (aged 26)	57	3	(Iraq Football Association) Al-Karma
16	DF	Mo Abualnadi	8 February 2001 (aged 25)	18	0	(Football Association of Malaysia) Selangor
17	DF	Salim Obaid	17 January 1992 (aged 34)	11	0	(Jordan Football Association) Al-Hussein
18	MF	Mohammad Abu Ghoush	13 July 2005 (aged 20)	2	0	(Jordan Football Association) Al-Hussein
19	DF	Saed Al-Rosan	1 February 1997 (aged 29)	21	2	(Jordan Football Association) Al-Hussein
20	MF	Mohannad Abu Taha	2 February 2003 (aged 23)	29	1	(Iraq Football Association) Al-Quwa Al-Jawiya
21	MF	Nizar Al-Rashdan	23 March 1999 (aged 27)	47	4	(Qatar Football Association) Qatar SC
22	GK	Abdallah Al-Fakhouri	22 January 2000 (aged 26)	11	0	(Jordan Football Association) Al-Wehdat
23	DF	Ihsan Haddad (captain)	5 February 1994 (aged 32)	92	2	(Jordan Football Association) Al-Hussein
24	FW	Ali Azaizeh	13 April 2004 (aged 22)	4	0	(Saudi Arabian Football Federation) Al-Shabab
25	MF	Mohammad Al-Dawoud	12 April 1992 (aged 34)	13	1	(Jordan Football Association) Al-Wehdat
26	DF	Anas Badawi	13 September 1997 (aged 28)	1	0	(Jordan Football Association) Al-Faisaly

== Group K ==
=== Colombia ===
Coach: (Argentina) Néstor Lorenzo

Colombia announced a 55-man preliminary squad on May 14. They announced their final squad on May 25.

No.	Pos.	Player	Date of birth (age)	Caps	Goals	Club
1	GK	David Ospina	31 August 1988 (aged 37)	130	0	(Colombian Football Federation) Atlético Nacional
2	DF	Daniel Muñoz	26 May 1996 (aged 30)	46	3	(The Football Association) Crystal Palace
3	DF	Jhon Lucumí	26 June 1998 (aged 27)	37	1	(Italian Football Federation) Bologna
4	DF	Santiago Arias	13 January 1992 (aged 34)	68	0	(Argentine Football Association) Independiente
5	MF	Kevin Castaño	29 September 2000 (aged 25)	25	0	(Argentine Football Association) River Plate
6	MF	Richard Ríos	2 June 2000 (aged 26)	32	2	(Portuguese Football Federation) Benfica
7	FW	Luis Díaz	13 January 1997 (aged 29)	74	22	(German Football Association) Bayern Munich
8	MF	Jorge Carrascal	25 May 1998 (aged 28)	24	2	(Brazilian Football Confederation) Flamengo
9	FW	Jhon Córdoba	11 May 1993 (aged 33)	21	6	(Russian Football Union) Krasnodar
10	MF	James Rodríguez (captain)	12 July 1991 (aged 34)	126	31	(United States Soccer Federation) Minnesota United FC
11	MF	Jhon Arias	21 September 1997 (aged 28)	38	6	(Brazilian Football Confederation) Palmeiras
12	GK	Camilo Vargas	9 March 1989 (aged 37)	42	0	(Mexican Football Federation) Atlas
13	DF	Yerry Mina	23 September 1994 (aged 31)	54	8	(Italian Football Federation) Cagliari
14	DF	Gustavo Puerta	23 July 2003 (aged 22)	6	1	(Royal Spanish Football Federation) Racing Santander
15	MF	Juan Portilla	12 September 1998 (aged 27)	10	0	(Brazilian Football Confederation) Athletico Paranaense
16	MF	Jefferson Lerma	25 October 1994 (aged 31)	65	5	(The Football Association) Crystal Palace
17	DF	Johan Mojica	21 August 1992 (aged 33)	45	1	(Royal Spanish Football Federation) Mallorca
18	DF	Willer Ditta	23 January 1998 (aged 28)	5	0	(Mexican Football Federation) Cruz Azul
19	FW	Cucho Hernández	20 April 1999 (aged 27)	9	2	(Royal Spanish Football Federation) Real Betis
20	MF	Juan Fernando Quintero	18 January 1993 (aged 33)	49	6	(Argentine Football Association) River Plate
21	FW	Jaminton Campaz	24 May 2000 (aged 26)	10	1	(Argentine Football Association) Rosario Central
22	DF	Deiver Machado	2 September 1993 (aged 32)	15	0	(French Football Federation) Nantes
23	DF	Davinson Sánchez	12 June 1996 (aged 29)	79	4	(Turkish Football Federation) Galatasaray
24	GK	Álvaro Montero	29 March 1995 (aged 31)	12	0	(Argentine Football Association) Vélez Sarsfield
25	FW	Luis Suárez	2 December 1997 (aged 28)	12	5	(Portuguese Football Federation) Sporting CP
26	FW	Andrés Gómez	12 September 2002 (aged 23)	8	2	(Brazilian Football Confederation) Vasco da Gama

=== DR Congo ===
Coach: (France) Sébastien Desabre

DR Congo announced their final squad on May 18. Rocky Bushiri withdrew injured and was replaced by Aaron Tshibola on May 20.

No.	Pos.	Player	Date of birth (age)	Caps	Goals	Club
1	GK	Lionel Mpasi	1 August 1994 (aged 31)	29	0	(French Football Federation) Le Havre
2	DF	Aaron Wan-Bissaka	26 November 1997 (aged 28)	12	0	(The Football Association) West Ham United
3	DF	Steve Kapuadi	30 April 1998 (aged 28)	4	0	(Polish Football Association) Widzew Łódź
4	DF	Axel Tuanzebe	14 November 1997 (aged 28)	14	1	(The Football Association) Burnley
5	DF	Dylan Batubinsika	15 February 1996 (aged 30)	14	1	(Hellenic Football Federation) AEL
6	MF	Ngal'ayel Mukau	3 November 2004 (aged 21)	14	0	(French Football Federation) Lille
7	MF	Nathanaël Mbuku	16 March 2002 (aged 24)	19	2	(French Football Federation) Montpellier
8	MF	Samuel Moutoussamy	12 August 1996 (aged 29)	58	0	(Hellenic Football Federation) Atromitos
9	FW	Brian Cipenga	11 March 1998 (aged 28)	8	0	(Royal Spanish Football Federation) Castellón
10	MF	Théo Bongonda	20 November 1995 (aged 30)	38	7	(Russian Football Union) Spartak Moscow
11	FW	Gaël Kakuta	21 June 1991 (aged 34)	31	5	(Hellenic Football Federation) AEL
12	DF	Joris Kayembe	8 August 1994 (aged 31)	26	1	(Royal Belgian Football Association) Genk
13	FW	Meschak Elia	6 August 1997 (aged 28)	69	12	(Turkish Football Federation) Alanyaspor
14	MF	Noah Sadiki	17 December 2004 (aged 21)	20	0	(The Football Association) Sunderland
15	MF	Aaron Tshibola	2 January 1995 (aged 31)	17	1	(Scottish Football Association) Kilmarnock
16	GK	Timothy Fayulu	24 July 1999 (aged 26)	3	0	(Football Federation of Armenia) Noah
17	FW	Cédric Bakambu	11 April 1991 (aged 35)	70	21	(Royal Spanish Football Federation) Real Betis
18	MF	Charles Pickel	15 May 1997 (aged 29)	34	1	(Royal Spanish Football Federation) Espanyol
19	FW	Fiston Mayele	24 June 1994 (aged 31)	37	6	(Egyptian Football Association) Pyramids
20	FW	Yoane Wissa	3 September 1996 (aged 29)	38	9	(The Football Association) Newcastle United
21	GK	Matthieu Epolo	15 January 2005 (aged 21)	1	0	(Royal Belgian Football Association) Standard Liège
22	DF	Chancel Mbemba (captain)	8 August 1994 (aged 31)	109	7	(French Football Federation) Lille
23	FW	Simon Banza	13 August 1996 (aged 29)	15	2	(United Arab Emirates Football Association) Al Jazira
24	DF	Gédéon Kalulu	29 August 1997 (aged 28)	28	0	(Cyprus Football Association) Aris Limassol
25	MF	Edo Kayembe	3 June 1998 (aged 28)	43	2	(The Football Association) Watford
26	DF	Arthur Masuaku	7 November 1993 (aged 32)	45	4	(French Football Federation) Lens

=== Portugal ===
Coach: (Spain) Roberto Martínez

Portugal announced their final squad on May 19.

No.	Pos.	Player	Date of birth (age)	Caps	Goals	Club
1	GK	Diogo Costa	19 September 1999 (aged 26)	43	0	(Portuguese Football Federation) Porto
2	DF	Nélson Semedo	16 November 1993 (aged 32)	50	0	(Turkish Football Federation) Fenerbahçe
3	DF	Rúben Dias	14 May 1997 (aged 29)	76	3	(The Football Association) Manchester City
4	DF	Tomás Araújo	16 May 2002 (aged 24)	5	0	(Portuguese Football Federation) Benfica
5	DF	Diogo Dalot	18 March 1999 (aged 27)	35	3	(The Football Association) Manchester United
6	MF	Matheus Nunes	27 August 1998 (aged 27)	20	2	(The Football Association) Manchester City
7	FW	Cristiano Ronaldo (captain)	5 February 1985 (aged 41)	228	143	(Saudi Arabian Football Federation) Al-Nassr
8	MF	Bruno Fernandes	8 September 1994 (aged 31)	89	29	(The Football Association) Manchester United
9	FW	Gonçalo Ramos	20 June 2001 (aged 24)	25	10	(French Football Federation) Paris Saint-Germain
10	MF	Bernardo Silva	10 August 1994 (aged 31)	109	14	(The Football Association) Manchester City
11	FW	João Félix	10 November 1999 (aged 26)	54	12	(Saudi Arabian Football Federation) Al-Nassr
12	GK	José Sá	17 January 1993 (aged 33)	5	0	(The Football Association) Wolverhampton Wanderers
13	DF	Renato Veiga	29 July 2003 (aged 22)	13	1	(Royal Spanish Football Federation) Villarreal
14	DF	Gonçalo Inácio	25 August 2001 (aged 24)	22	2	(Portuguese Football Federation) Sporting CP
15	MF	João Neves	27 September 2004 (aged 21)	22	3	(French Football Federation) Paris Saint-Germain
16	FW	Francisco Trincão	29 December 1999 (aged 26)	18	3	(Portuguese Football Federation) Sporting CP
17	FW	Rafael Leão	10 June 1999 (aged 27)	44	5	(Italian Football Federation) AC Milan
18	FW	Pedro Neto	9 March 2000 (aged 26)	25	3	(The Football Association) Chelsea
19	FW	Gonçalo Guedes	29 November 1996 (aged 29)	34	8	(Royal Spanish Football Federation) Real Sociedad
20	DF	João Cancelo	27 May 1994 (aged 32)	68	12	(Royal Spanish Football Federation) Barcelona
21	MF	Rúben Neves	13 March 1997 (aged 29)	67	1	(Saudi Arabian Football Federation) Al-Hilal
22	GK	Rui Silva	7 February 1994 (aged 32)	3	0	(Portuguese Football Federation) Sporting CP
23	MF	Vitinha	13 February 2000 (aged 26)	38	0	(French Football Federation) Paris Saint-Germain
24	DF	Samú Costa	27 November 2000 (aged 25)	6	0	(Royal Spanish Football Federation) Mallorca
25	DF	Nuno Mendes	19 June 2002 (aged 23)	44	1	(French Football Federation) Paris Saint-Germain
26	FW	Francisco Conceição	14 December 2002 (aged 23)	17	4	(Italian Football Federation) Juventus

=== Uzbekistan ===
Coach: (Italy) Fabio Cannavaro

Uzbekistan announced a 40-man preliminary squad on May 5. The squad was reduced to 39 players on May 22 as Ibrokhimkhalil Yuldoshev withdrew injured, then to 30 players on May 24. Their final squad was announced on June 2. Jaloliddin Masharipov withdrew due to a back injury and was replaced by Ruslanbek Jiyanov on June 15.

No.	Pos.	Player	Date of birth (age)	Caps	Goals	Club
1	GK	Utkir Yusupov	4 January 1991 (aged 35)	40	0	(Uzbekistan Football Association) Navbahor Namangan
2	DF	Abdukodir Khusanov	29 February 2004 (aged 22)	27	0	(The Football Association) Manchester City
3	DF	Khojiakbar Alijonov	19 April 1997 (aged 29)	40	2	(Uzbekistan Football Association) Pakhtakor
4	DF	Farrukh Sayfiev	17 January 1991 (aged 35)	46	1	(Uzbekistan Football Association) Neftchi Fergana
5	DF	Rustam Ashurmatov	7 July 1996 (aged 29)	49	1	(Football Federation Islamic Republic of Iran) Esteghlal
6	MF	Akmal Mozgovoy	2 April 1999 (aged 27)	25	1	(Uzbekistan Football Association) Pakhtakor
7	MF	Otabek Shukurov	22 June 1996 (aged 29)	84	9	(United Arab Emirates Football Association) Baniyas
8	MF	Jamshid Iskanderov	16 October 1993 (aged 32)	38	4	(Uzbekistan Football Association) Neftchi Fergana
9	MF	Odiljon Hamrobekov	13 February 1996 (aged 30)	72	1	(Football Federation Islamic Republic of Iran) Tractor
10	MF	Ruslanbek Jiyanov	5 June 2001 (aged 25)	5	0	(Uzbekistan Football Association) Navbahor Namangan
11	MF	Oston Urunov	19 December 2000 (aged 25)	42	10	(Football Federation Islamic Republic of Iran) Persepolis
12	GK	Abduvohid Nematov	20 March 2001 (aged 25)	8	0	(Uzbekistan Football Association) Nasaf
13	DF	Sherzod Nasrullaev	23 July 1998 (aged 27)	31	2	(Uzbekistan Football Association) Nasaf
14	FW	Eldor Shomurodov (captain)	29 June 1995 (aged 30)	92	44	(Turkish Football Federation) İstanbul Başakşehir
15	DF	Umar Eshmurodov	30 November 1992 (aged 33)	29	0	(Uzbekistan Football Association) Nasaf
16	GK	Botirali Ergashev	23 June 1995 (aged 30)	2	0	(Uzbekistan Football Association) Neftchi Fergana
17	MF	Dostonbek Khamdamov	24 July 1996 (aged 29)	34	5	(Uzbekistan Football Association) Pakhtakor
18	DF	Abdulla Abdullaev	1 September 1997 (aged 28)	17	0	(United Arab Emirates Football Association) Dibba
19	MF	Azizjon Ganiev	22 February 1998 (aged 28)	19	0	(United Arab Emirates Football Association) Al Bataeh
20	FW	Azizbek Amonov	30 October 1997 (aged 28)	12	2	(Uzbekistan Football Association) Dinamo Samarqand
21	FW	Igor Sergeev	30 April 1993 (aged 33)	83	25	(Football Federation Islamic Republic of Iran) Persepolis
22	MF	Abbosbek Fayzullaev	3 October 2003 (aged 22)	32	9	(Turkish Football Federation) İstanbul Başakşehir
23	MF	Sherzod Esanov	1 February 2003 (aged 23)	1	0	(Uzbekistan Football Association) Bukhara
24	DF	Bekhruz Karimov	7 August 2007 (aged 18)	2	0	(Uzbekistan Football Association) Surkhon Termiz
25	DF	Avazbek Ulmasaliev	27 March 2000 (aged 26)	0	0	(Uzbekistan Football Association) AGMK
26	DF	Jakhongir Urozov	18 January 2004 (aged 22)	4	0	(Uzbekistan Football Association) Dinamo Samarqand

== Group L ==
=== Croatia ===
Coach: Zlatko Dalić

Croatia announced their final squad on May 18.

No.	Pos.	Player	Date of birth (age)	Caps	Goals	Club
1	GK	Dominik Livaković	9 January 1995 (aged 31)	75	0	(Croatian Football Federation) Dinamo Zagreb
2	DF	Josip Stanišić	2 April 2000 (aged 26)	31	0	(German Football Association) Bayern Munich
3	DF	Marin Pongračić	11 September 1997 (aged 28)	20	0	(Italian Football Federation) Fiorentina
4	DF	Joško Gvardiol	23 January 2002 (aged 24)	48	4	(The Football Association) Manchester City
5	DF	Duje Ćaleta-Car	17 September 1996 (aged 29)	38	1	(Royal Spanish Football Federation) Real Sociedad
6	DF	Josip Šutalo	28 February 2000 (aged 26)	33	0	(Royal Dutch Football Association) Ajax
7	MF	Nikola Moro	12 March 1998 (aged 28)	10	0	(Italian Football Federation) Bologna
8	MF	Mateo Kovačić	6 May 1994 (aged 32)	113	5	(The Football Association) Manchester City
9	FW	Andrej Kramarić	19 June 1991 (aged 34)	116	36	(German Football Association) TSG Hoffenheim
10	MF	Luka Modrić (captain)	9 September 1985 (aged 40)	198	29	(Italian Football Federation) AC Milan
11	FW	Ante Budimir	22 July 1991 (aged 34)	38	6	(Royal Spanish Football Federation) Osasuna
12	GK	Ivor Pandur	25 March 2000 (aged 26)	0	0	(The Football Association) Hull City
13	MF	Nikola Vlašić	4 October 1997 (aged 28)	63	10	(Italian Football Federation) Torino
14	FW	Ivan Perišić	2 February 1989 (aged 37)	154	38	(Royal Dutch Football Association) PSV Eindhoven
15	MF	Mario Pašalić	9 February 1995 (aged 31)	85	12	(Italian Football Federation) Atalanta
16	MF	Martin Baturina	16 February 2003 (aged 23)	19	1	(Italian Football Federation) Como
17	MF	Petar Sučić	25 October 2003 (aged 22)	17	1	(Italian Football Federation) Inter Milan
18	DF	Kristijan Jakić	14 May 1997 (aged 29)	17	2	(German Football Association) FC Augsburg
19	MF	Toni Fruk	9 March 2001 (aged 25)	7	1	(Croatian Football Federation) Rijeka
20	FW	Igor Matanović	31 March 2003 (aged 23)	9	2	(German Football Association) SC Freiburg
21	MF	Luka Sučić	8 September 2002 (aged 23)	21	1	(Royal Spanish Football Federation) Real Sociedad
22	DF	Luka Vušković	24 February 2007 (aged 19)	5	1	(German Football Association) Hamburger SV
23	GK	Dominik Kotarski	10 February 2000 (aged 26)	4	0	(Danish Football Association) Copenhagen
24	FW	Marco Pašalić	14 September 2000 (aged 25)	15	1	(United States Soccer Federation) Orlando City SC
25	DF	Martin Erlić	24 January 1998 (aged 28)	13	1	(Danish Football Association) Midtjylland
26	FW	Petar Musa	4 March 1998 (aged 28)	11	1	(United States Soccer Federation) FC Dallas

=== England ===
Coach: (Germany) Thomas Tuchel

England announced their final squad on May 22. Tino Livramento withdrew injured and was replaced by Trevoh Chalobah on June 16.

No.	Pos.	Player	Date of birth (age)	Caps	Goals	Club
1	GK	Jordan Pickford	7 March 1994 (aged 32)	84	0	(The Football Association) Everton
2	DF	Ezri Konsa	23 October 1997 (aged 28)	20	1	(The Football Association) Aston Villa
3	DF	Nico O'Reilly	21 March 2005 (aged 21)	5	0	(The Football Association) Manchester City
4	MF	Declan Rice	14 January 1999 (aged 27)	73	7	(The Football Association) Arsenal
5	DF	John Stones	28 May 1994 (aged 32)	89	3	(The Football Association) Manchester City
6	DF	Marc Guéhi	13 July 2000 (aged 25)	29	1	(The Football Association) Manchester City
7	FW	Bukayo Saka	5 September 2001 (aged 24)	49	14	(The Football Association) Arsenal
8	MF	Elliot Anderson	6 November 2002 (aged 23)	9	0	(The Football Association) Nottingham Forest
9	FW	Harry Kane (captain)	28 July 1993 (aged 32)	114	79	(German Football Association) Bayern Munich
10	MF	Jude Bellingham	29 June 2003 (aged 22)	48	6	(Royal Spanish Football Federation) Real Madrid
11	FW	Marcus Rashford	31 October 1997 (aged 28)	72	18	(Royal Spanish Football Federation) Barcelona
12	DF	Trevoh Chalobah	5 July 1999 (aged 26)	1	0	(The Football Association) Chelsea
13	GK	Dean Henderson	12 March 1997 (aged 29)	5	0	(The Football Association) Crystal Palace
14	MF	Jordan Henderson	17 June 1990 (aged 35)	90	3	(The Football Association) Brentford
15	DF	Dan Burn	9 May 1992 (aged 34)	8	0	(The Football Association) Newcastle United
16	MF	Kobbie Mainoo	19 April 2005 (aged 21)	14	0	(The Football Association) Manchester United
17	MF	Morgan Rogers	26 July 2002 (aged 23)	15	1	(The Football Association) Aston Villa
18	FW	Anthony Gordon	24 February 2001 (aged 25)	19	3	(The Football Association) Newcastle United
19	FW	Ollie Watkins	30 December 1995 (aged 30)	22	7	(The Football Association) Aston Villa
20	FW	Noni Madueke	10 March 2002 (aged 24)	11	1	(The Football Association) Arsenal
21	MF	Eberechi Eze	29 June 1998 (aged 27)	17	3	(The Football Association) Arsenal
22	FW	Ivan Toney	16 March 1996 (aged 30)	8	1	(Saudi Arabian Football Federation) Al-Ahli
23	GK	James Trafford	10 October 2002 (aged 23)	2	0	(The Football Association) Manchester City
24	DF	Reece James	8 December 1999 (aged 26)	24	1	(The Football Association) Chelsea
25	DF	Djed Spence	9 August 2000 (aged 25)	6	0	(The Football Association) Tottenham Hotspur
26	DF	Jarell Quansah	29 January 2003 (aged 23)	3	0	(German Football Association) Bayer Leverkusen

=== Ghana ===
Coach: (Portugal) Carlos Queiroz

Ghana announced a 28-man preliminary squad on May 25. Alexander Djiku withdrew injured and was replaced by Derrick Luckassen on June 1. They announced their final squad on June 2.

No.	Pos.	Player	Date of birth (age)	Caps	Goals	Club
1	GK	Lawrence Ati-Zigi	29 November 1996 (aged 29)	29	0	(Swiss Football Association) St. Gallen
2	DF	Alidu Seidu	4 June 2000 (aged 26)	24	1	(French Football Federation) Rennes
3	MF	Caleb Yirenkyi	15 January 2006 (aged 20)	11	1	(Danish Football Association) Nordsjælland
4	DF	Jonas Adjetey	13 December 2003 (aged 22)	10	0	(German Football Association) VfL Wolfsburg
5	MF	Thomas Partey	13 June 1993 (aged 32)	57	15	(Royal Spanish Football Federation) Villarreal
6	DF	Abdul Mumin	6 June 1998 (aged 28)	5	0	(Royal Spanish Football Federation) Rayo Vallecano
7	FW	Abdul Fatawu	8 March 2004 (aged 22)	28	3	(The Football Association) Leicester City
8	MF	Kwasi Sibo	24 June 1998 (aged 27)	8	0	(Royal Spanish Football Federation) Oviedo
9	FW	Jordan Ayew (captain)	11 September 1991 (aged 34)	120	34	(The Football Association) Leicester City
10	FW	Brandon Thomas-Asante	29 December 1998 (aged 27)	8	1	(The Football Association) Coventry City
11	MF	Antoine Semenyo	7 January 2000 (aged 26)	34	3	(The Football Association) Manchester City
12	GK	Joseph Anang	8 June 2000 (aged 26)	1	0	(Football Association of Ireland) St Patrick's Athletic
13	FW	Christopher Bonsu Baah	14 December 2004 (aged 21)	9	0	(Saudi Arabian Football Federation) Al-Qadsiah
14	DF	Gideon Mensah	18 July 1998 (aged 27)	40	0	(French Football Federation) Auxerre
15	MF	Elisha Owusu	7 November 1997 (aged 28)	20	0	(French Football Federation) Auxerre
16	GK	Benjamin Asare	13 July 1992 (aged 33)	11	0	(Ghana Football Association) Hearts of Oak
17	DF	Abdul Rahman Baba	2 July 1994 (aged 31)	51	1	(Hellenic Football Federation) PAOK
18	DF	Jerome Opoku	14 October 1998 (aged 27)	11	1	(Turkish Football Federation) İstanbul Başakşehir
19	FW	Iñaki Williams	15 June 1994 (aged 31)	26	2	(Royal Spanish Football Federation) Athletic Bilbao
20	MF	Augustine Boakye	3 November 2000 (aged 25)	0	0	(French Football Federation) Saint-Étienne
21	DF	Kojo Peprah Oppong	4 June 2004 (aged 22)	4	0	(French Football Federation) Nice
22	FW	Kamaldeen Sulemana	15 February 2002 (aged 24)	28	1	(Italian Football Federation) Atalanta
23	DF	Derrick Luckassen	3 July 1995 (aged 30)	1	0	(Cyprus Football Association) Pafos
24	FW	Ernest Nuamah	1 November 2003 (aged 22)	18	4	(French Football Federation) Lyon
25	FW	Prince Kwabena Adu	23 September 2003 (aged 22)	5	0	(Football Association of the Czech Republic) Viktoria Plzeň
26	DF	Marvin Senaya	28 January 2001 (aged 25)	2	0	(French Football Federation) Auxerre

=== Panama ===
Coach: (Spain) Thomas Christiansen

Panama announced their final squad on May 26.

No.	Pos.	Player	Date of birth (age)	Caps	Goals	Club
1	GK	Luis Mejía	16 March 1991 (aged 35)	56	0	(Uruguayan Football Association) Nacional
2	DF	César Blackman	2 April 1998 (aged 28)	40	3	(Slovak Football Association) Slovan Bratislava
3	DF	José Córdoba	3 June 2001 (aged 25)	32	1	(The Football Association) Norwich City
4	DF	Fidel Escobar	9 January 1995 (aged 31)	99	4	(Costa Rican Football Federation) Saprissa
5	DF	Edgardo Fariña	19 October 2001 (aged 24)	18	0	(Russian Football Union) Pari Nizhny Novgorod
6	MF	Cristian Martínez	6 February 1997 (aged 29)	66	2	(Israel Football Association) Ironi Kiryat Shmona
7	MF	José Luis Rodríguez	19 June 1998 (aged 27)	70	8	(Mexican Football Federation) Juárez
8	MF	Adalberto Carrasquilla	28 November 1998 (aged 27)	73	3	(Mexican Football Federation) Pumas UNAM
9	FW	Tomás Rodríguez	9 March 1999 (aged 27)	13	4	(Costa Rican Football Federation) Saprissa
10	MF	Ismael Díaz	12 May 1997 (aged 29)	57	17	(Mexican Football Federation) León
11	MF	Yoel Bárcenas	23 October 1993 (aged 32)	104	10	(Mexican Football Federation) Mazatlán
12	GK	César Samudio	23 February 1994 (aged 32)	5	0	(National Autonomous Federation of Football of Honduras) Marathón
13	DF	Jiovany Ramos	26 January 1997 (aged 29)	23	2	(Venezuelan Football Federation) Puerto Cabello
14	DF	Carlos Harvey	3 February 2000 (aged 26)	28	3	(United States Soccer Federation) Minnesota United FC
15	DF	Eric Davis	31 March 1991 (aged 35)	107	9	(Panamanian Football Federation) Plaza Amador
16	DF	Andrés Andrade	16 October 1998 (aged 27)	50	1	(Austrian Football Association) LASK
17	FW	José Fajardo	18 August 1993 (aged 32)	68	17	(Ecuadorian Football Federation) Universidad Católica
18	FW	Cecilio Waterman	13 April 1991 (aged 35)	55	15	(Football Federation of Chile) Universidad de Concepción
19	MF	Alberto Quintero	18 December 1987 (aged 38)	141	7	(Panamanian Football Federation) Plaza Amador
20	MF	Aníbal Godoy (captain)	10 February 1990 (aged 36)	159	4	(United States Soccer Federation) San Diego FC
21	MF	César Yanis	28 January 1996 (aged 30)	56	5	(Football Federation of Chile) Cobresal
22	GK	Orlando Mosquera	25 December 1994 (aged 31)	48	0	(Saudi Arabian Football Federation) Al-Fayha
23	DF	Michael Amir Murillo	11 February 1996 (aged 30)	94	9	(Turkish Football Federation) Beşiktaş
24	FW	Azarias Londoño	21 June 2001 (aged 24)	11	0	(Ecuadorian Football Federation) Universidad Católica
25	DF	Roderick Miller	3 April 1992 (aged 34)	50	2	(Association of Football Federations of Azerbaijan) Turan Tovuz
26	DF	Jorge Gutiérrez	1 September 1998 (aged 27)	18	0	(Venezuelan Football Federation) Deportivo La Guaira

== Statistics ==
=== Age ===
==== Players ====
===== Outfield players =====
- Oldest: (Portugal national football team) Cristiano Ronaldo (41 years, 126 days)
- Youngest: (Mexico national football team) Gilberto Mora (17 years, 240 days)

===== Goalkeepers =====
- Oldest: (Scotland national football team) Craig Gordon (43 years, 162 days)
- Youngest: (Bosnia and Herzegovina national football team) Mladen Jurkas (18 years, 247 days)

===== Captains =====
- Oldest: (Portugal national football team) Cristiano Ronaldo (41 years, 126 days)
- Youngest: (Canada men's national soccer team) Alphonso Davies (25 years, 221 days)

==== Coaches ====
- Oldest: (Netherlands) Dick Advocaat (Curaçao, 78 years, 257 days)
- Youngest: Julian Nagelsmann (Germany, 38 years, 323 days)

=== Player representation by club ===
Players	Clubs
19	(The Football Association) Manchester City
17	(German Football Association) Bayern Munich
16	(French Football Federation) Paris Saint-Germain
15	(The Football Association) Arsenal (Royal Spanish Football Federation) Barcelona
12	(The Football Association) Crystal Palace (The Football Association) Manchester United (Saudi Arabian Football Federation) Al-Hilal (Royal Spanish Football Federation) Atlético Madrid
11	(German Football Association) Borussia Dortmund (Turkish Football Federation) Galatasaray
10	(Football Association of the Czech Republic) Slavia Prague (The Football Association) Liverpool (The Football Association) Sunderland (Italian Football Federation) AC Milan (Royal Dutch Football Association) PSV Eindhoven (Royal Spanish Football Federation) Real Madrid (Turkish Football Federation) Fenerbahçe

=== Player representation by league system ===
Nations in bold were represented at the tournament.

Country	Players	Percent	Outside national squad	Lower tier players
**England** (Note: Includes players from Swansea City and Wrexham, which are based in Wales but play in the English league system.)	205	16.43%	184	42 (Note: Includes five players from the third tier and one player from the fifth tier.)
**Germany**	110	8.81%	91	8 (Note: Includes one player from the fifth tier.)
**Spain**	85	6.81%	68	5
**France** (Note: Includes players from Monaco, which is based in Monaco but plays in the French league system. Monaco is not a FIFA member.)	84	6.73%	76	7 (Note: Includes one player from the third tier.)
Italy	71	5.69%	71	5
**Saudi Arabia**	50	4.01%	25	2
**United States** (Note: Includes players from Toronto FC and Vancouver Whitecaps FC, which are based in Canada but play in the American league system.)	50	4.01%	42	5
**Turkey**	45	3.61%	30	2
**Netherlands**	38	3.04%	36	5
**Brazil**	32	2.56%	25	0
**Portugal**	31	2.48%	26	4
**Belgium**	29	2.32%	26	1
**Qatar**	29	2.32%	4	0
**Mexico**	26	2.08%	14	0
**Iran**	23	1.84%	6	0
**Czech Republic**	22	1.76%	5	0
**Egypt**	20	1.60%	3	0
**Scotland**	20	1.60%	12	0
**South Africa**	19	1.52%	0	0
**Argentina**	17	1.36%	15	0
**Uzbekistan**	16	1.28%	1	0
**Australia** (Note: Includes players from Auckland FC and Wellington Phoenix, which are based in New Zealand but play in the Australian league system.)	15	1.20%	10	0
**Iraq**	15	1.20%	5	0
United Arab Emirates	15	1.20%	15	0
Denmark	14	1.12%	14	0
Greece	12	0.96%	12	0
**Jordan**	12	0.96%	0	0
Russia	12	0.96%	12	0
**Switzerland**	12	0.96%	10	1
Cyprus	10	0.80%	10	0
**Austria**	8	0.64%	5	0
**South Korea**	8	0.64%	1	0
**Japan**	7	0.56%	4	1
**Norway**	7	0.56%	3	0
**Tunisia**	7	0.56%	1	0
**Croatia**	6	0.48%	4	0
**Ecuador**	5	0.40%	3	0
Poland	5	0.40%	5	0
Israel	4	0.32%	4	0
**Sweden**	4	0.32%	1	1
**Algeria**	3	0.24%	0	0
Hungary	3	0.24%	3	0
Malaysia	3	0.24%	3	0
**Morocco**	3	0.24%	1	0
**Paraguay**	3	0.24%	0	0
Bulgaria	2	0.16%	2	0
Chile	2	0.16%	2	0
Costa Rica	2	0.16%	2	0
Ireland	2	0.16%	2	0
**Panama**	2	0.16%	0	0
Romania	2	0.16%	2	0
Serbia	2	0.16%	2	0
Slovakia	2	0.16%	2	0
Slovenia	2	0.16%	2	0
Venezuela	2	0.16%	2	0
Armenia	1	0.08%	1	0
Azerbaijan	1	0.08%	1	0
**Bosnia and Herzegovina**	1	0.08%	0	0
China	1	0.08%	1	0
**Colombia**	1	0.08%	0	0
Finland	1	0.08%	1	0
**Ghana**	1	0.08%	0	0
**Haiti**	1	0.08%	0	0
Honduras	1	0.08%	1	0
Indonesia	1	0.08%	1	0
Kazakhstan	1	0.08%	1	0
Thailand	1	0.08%	1	0
**Uruguay**	1	0.08%	1	0
**Total**	**1248**	**100%**	**913 (73.16%)**	**89 (7.13%)**

- None of the squads were made up entirely of players from the countries' domestic leagues. The Qatar and Saudi Arabia squads had 25 players from their respective leagues.
- The Cape Verde, Curaçao, DR Congo, Ivory Coast, Senegal and Uruguay squads did not include any players employed by clubs in their home country.
- Uruguay league was the only domestic league represented at the tournament which did not provide any player for their national team.
- The Canada and New Zealand squads both included players employed by domestic clubs, but no players employed in the Canadian or New Zealand domestic league systems. All Canadian domestic players played for Canadian teams in the American Major League Soccer; all New Zealand domestic players played for New Zealand teams in the Australian A-League Men.
- The Netherlands squad had the most players from a single foreign federation, with 15 players employed in England.
- Of the countries not represented by a national team at the tournament, Italy's league provided the most squad members, with 71.
- The lowest leagues on a domestic pyramid to be represented at the tournament were the National League, the English fifth tier, and Oberliga, the German fifth tier. They were represented by New Zealand player Tommy Smith (Braintree Town) and Haiti player Josué Duverger (Cosmos Koblenz), respectively.

=== Player representation by club confederation ===
Confederation	Players	Percentage
UEFA	853	68.51%
AFC	189	15.14%
CONCACAF	82	6.57%
CONMEBOL	63	5.05%
CAF	53	4.25%
OFC	8	0.64%

=== Average age of squads ===
Average age	Countries
25	Ivory Coast
26	Algeria, Bosnia and Herzegovina, Canada, Ecuador, Ghana, Iraq, Morocco, Norway, Senegal, Spain, Tunisia
27	Australia, Czech Republic, England, France, Haiti, Japan, Netherlands, Sweden, South Africa, Turkey, United States
28	Austria, Belgium, Croatia, Curaçao, Germany, Jordan, Mexico, New Zealand, Portugal, Saudi Arabia, South Korea, Switzerland, Uzbekistan
29	Argentina, Brazil, Cape Verde, DR Congo, Egypt, Paraguay, Qatar, Scotland, Uruguay
30	Colombia, Iran, Panama

=== Coach representation by country ===
Coaches in bold represented their own country.

Number	Country	Coaches
6	Argentina	**Lionel Scaloni**, Gustavo Alfaro (Paraguay), Sebastián Beccacece (Ecuador), Marcelo Bielsa (Uruguay), Néstor Lorenzo (Colombia), Mauricio Pochettino (United States)
6	France	**Didier Deschamps**, Sébastien Desabre (DR Congo), Sabri Lamouchi, Hervé Renard (both Tunisia), Rudi Garcia (Belgium), Sébastien Migné (Haiti)
4	Spain	**Luis de la Fuente**, Thomas Christiansen (Panama), Julen Lopetegui (Qatar), Roberto Martínez (Portugal)
3	Germany	**Julian Nagelsmann**, Ralf Rangnick (Austria), Thomas Tuchel (England)
3	Italy	Carlo Ancelotti (Brazil), Fabio Cannavaro (Uzbekistan), Vincenzo Montella (Turkey)
2	Australia	**Tony Popovic**, Graham Arnold (Iraq)
2	Bosnia and Herzegovina	**Sergej Barbarez**, Vladimir Petković (Algeria)
2	England	Darren Bazeley (New Zealand), Graham Potter (Sweden)
2	Morocco	**Mohamed Ouahbi**, Jamal Sellami (Jordan)
2	Netherlands	**Ronald Koeman**, Dick Advocaat (Curaçao)
1	Belgium	Hugo Broos (South Africa)
1	Cape Verde	**Bubista**
1	Croatia	**Zlatko Dalić**
1	Czech Republic	**Miroslav Koubek**
1	Egypt	**Hossam Hassan**
1	Greece	Georgios Donis (Saudi Arabia)
1	Iran	**Amir Ghalenoei**
1	Ivory Coast	**Emerse Faé**
1	Japan	**Hajime Moriyasu**
1	Mexico	**Javier Aguirre**
1	Norway	**Ståle Solbakken**
1	Portugal	Carlos Queiroz (Ghana)
1	Scotland	**Steve Clarke**
1	Senegal	**Pape Thiaw**
1	South Korea	**Hong Myung-bo**
1	Switzerland	**Murat Yakin**
1	United States	Jesse Marsch (Canada)
