= 2026 Jeonbuk Hyundai Motors season =

Jeonbuk Hyundai Motors
2026 season
- Manager: Gus Poyet
- Stadium: Jeonju World Cup Stadium; Jeonju, Jeonbuk
- Top goalscorer: League: Tiago Orobó (9 goals); All: Tiago Orobó (11 goals)
Home colours	Away colours	Third colours
- All statistics correct as of 6 December 2025.

The 2026 Jeonbuk Hyundai Motors season was their 33rd season in the club's history and their 32nd consecutive season in the top flight of South Korean football. Following a historic 2025 campaign in which the club secured its record-extending 10th K League 1 title and sixth Korea Cup to complete a domestic double, the club enters 2026 under the leadership of newly appointed head coach Jeong Jeong-yong.

The season marks a significant transition following the sudden departure of Gustavo Poyet, who resigned in December 2025 despite his "Double" success. Poyet's exit was attributed to a breakdown in the coaching structure and "differences" with the league's disciplinary stance after his long-time assistant, Mauricio Taricco, resigned amid a racism controversy involving a match official.

== Players ==
No.	Name	Nationality	Date of birth (age)	Previous club	Contract Since	Contract end
Goalkeepers
1	Lee Ju-hyeon	(South Korea)	6 December 1998 (age 27)	(South Korea) Bucheon 1995	2026	2026
29	Gong Si-hyeon	(South Korea)	23 February 2005 (age 21)	Youth Team	2021	2026
31	Song Bum-keun	(South Korea)	15 October 1997 (age 29)	(Japan) Shonan Bellmare	2025	
51	Lee Han-gyeol	(South Korea)	19 July 2007 (age 19)	Youth Team		
71	Jeon Ji-wan	(South Korea)	14 May 2004 (age 22)	(Japan) FC Ryukyu	2020	
91	Jeong Dae-yeong	(South Korea)	11 September 2006 (age 20)	(South Korea) Kyungnam University	2026	
Defenders
2	Kim Young-bin	(South Korea)	20 September 1991 (age 35)	(South Korea) Gangwon	2025	
3	Yeon Je-un	(South Korea)	28 August 1994 (age 32)	(South Korea) Jeju	2024	
4	Cho Wi-je	(South Korea)	25 August 2001 (age 25)	(South Korea) Busan IPark	2026	2026
5	Park Ji-soo	(South Korea)	13 June 1994 (age 32)	(China) Wuhan Three Towns	2026	
15	Kim Ha-jun	(South Korea)	17 July 2002 (age 24)	(South Korea) FC Anyang	2024	
22	Kim Jun-yeong	(South Korea)	31 May 2004 (age 22)	(South Korea) Hwaseong	2025	2025
23	Kim Tae-hwan	(South Korea)	24 July 1989 (age 37)	(South Korea) Ulsan HD	2024	2026
24	Lee Sang-myung	(South Korea)	23 April 2003 (age 23)	(South Korea) Cheonan City	2026	2026
27	Hwang Seung-jun	(South Korea)	3 August 2005 (age 21)	(South Korea) Yong In University	2025	2025
39	Seo Jeong-hyeok	(South Korea)	9 March 2006 (age 20)	Youth team	2024	
44	Kim Joo-hyung	(South Korea)	20 August 2007 (age 19)	(South Korea) Jinwi	2026	
55	Choi Jin-woong	(South Korea)	23 December 2004 (age 21)	(South Korea) Cheonan City	2026	
66	Choi Woo-jin	(South Korea)	18 July 2004 (age 22)	(South Korea) Incheon United	2025	
74	Kim Soo-hyung	(South Korea)	25 June 2007 (age 19)	Youth team	2026	
77	Kim Tae-Hyun	(South Korea)	19 December 1996 (age 29)	(South Korea) Jeonnam Dragons	2024	
80	Kwak Hee-byeok	(South Korea)	15 March 2005 (age 21)	(South Korea) Dankook University	2026	
90	Jeong Sang-woon	(South Korea)	3 April 2003 (age 23)	(South Korea) Sangji University	2025	2025
Midfielders
6	Maeng Seong-ung	(South Korea)	4 February 1998 (age 28)	(South Korea) Gimcheon Sangmu	2022	
10	Lee Seung-woo	(South Korea)	6 January 1998 (age 28)	(South Korea) Suwon	2024	2025
11	Kim Seung-sub	(South Korea)	1 November 1996 (age 30)	(South Korea) Jeju	2026	
13	Kang Sang-yoon	(South Korea)	31 May 2004 (age 22)	(South Korea) Busan IPark	2022	
14	Jeon Byung-kwan	(South Korea)	10 November 2002 (age 24)	(South Korea) Gimcheon Sangmu	2024	2026
16	João Gamboa	(Portugal)	31 August 1996 (age 30)	(Poland) Pogoń Szczecin	2025	
17	Lee Soo-bin	(South Korea)	7 May 2000 (age 26)	(South Korea) Pohang Steelers	2022	
26	Moon Jun-hyuk	(South Korea)	21 May 2005 (age 21)	(South Korea) Jeonju University	2026	
28	Lee Yeong-jae	(South Korea)	13 September 1994 (age 32)	(South Korea) Gimcheon Sangmu	2024	
30	Dodô	(Brazil)	15 June 2001 (age 25)	(Brazil) Coimbra	2026	2026
33	Han Seok-jin	(South Korea)	19 December 2007 (age 18)	Youth team	2026	
34	Eom Seung-min	(South Korea)	2 May 2003 (age 23)	(South Korea) FC Mokpo	2024	
36	Jang Nam-ung	(South Korea)	9 February 2004 (age 22)	(South Korea) Sangji University		
42	Woo Hyun-soo	(South Korea)	17 April 2003 (age 23)	(South Korea) Kwangwoon University	2026	
47	Lee Gun-hee	(South Korea)	13 August 2007 (age 19)	(South Korea) Jinwi		
70	Park Hyun-min	(South Korea)	2 April 2007 (age 19)	Youth team		
88	Yoon Hyun-seok	(South Korea)	8 November 2003 (age 23)	(South Korea) Hongik University	2025	2025
97	Kim Jin-gyu	(South Korea)	24 February 1997 (age 29)	(South Korea) Gimcheon Sangmu	2022	2026
Forwards
7	Lee Dong-jun	(South Korea)	1 February 1997 (age 29)	(South Korea) Gimcheon Sangmu	2023	
9	Tiago Orobó	(Brazil)	28 October 1993 (age 33)	(South Korea) Daejeon Hana Citizen	2024	
19	Park Ju-yeong	(South Korea)	23 April 2003 (age 23)	(South Korea) Hwaseong	2023	
21	Patrick Twumasi	(Ghana)	9 May 1994 (age 32)	(Cyprus) Pafos	2025	
40	Ahn Tae-hoon	(South Korea)	18 June 2007 (age 19)	(South Korea) Bupyeong High School	2026	
79	Kim Chang-hoon	(South Korea)	23 October 2004 (age 22)	Youth Team	2023	
81	Gytis Paulauskas	(Lithuania)	27 September 1999 (age 27)	(South Korea) Jeju SK		
95	Italo	(Brazil)	13 October 2002 (age 24)	(Brazil) Chapecoense	2026	2027
96	Andrea Compagno	(Italy)	22 April 1996 (age 30)	(China) Tianjin Jinmen Tiger	2025	2026
99	Bruno Mota	(Brazil)	10 February 1996 (age 30)	(South Korea) FC Anyang		
Players loaned out
17	Jin Tae-Ho	(South Korea)	20 January 2006 (age 20)	Youth Team	2021	2026
30	Kim Young-hwan (M)	(South Korea)	23 March 2002 (age 24)	(South Korea) Chungbuk Cheongju		
92	Kim Du-hyun	(South Korea)	2 March 2007 (age 19)	(South Korea) Shintaein	2026	
Players enlisted
	Byeon Jun-soo	30 November 2001 (age 24)	(South Korea) Gwangju	2026		
Players who left during mid-season
8	Oberdan	(Brazil)	3 July 1995 (age 31)	(South Korea) Pohang Steelers	2026	2026
73	Kim Ye-geon	(South Korea)	7 August 2008 (age 18)	Youth team		

== Backroom staff ==
=== Coaching staff ===
- Manager: (South Korea) Chung Jung-yong
- Assistant manager: (South Korea) Sung Han-soo
  (South Korea) Lee Mun-sun
- First-team coach: (South Korea)
- Goalkeeper coach: (South Korea) Seo Dong-myung
- Analysis coach: (South Korea)
- Fitness coach: (South Korea) Shim Jung-hyeon

Source: Official website

=== Support staff ===
- Physiotherapist: (Brazil) Gilvan Oliveira
- Medical department: (South Korea) Kim Jae-oh, (South Korea) Kim Byeong-seon, (South Korea) Lee Gyu-yeol
- Interpreters: (South Korea) Kim Min-su, (South Korea) Mun Keon-ho, (South Korea) Choe Dong-eun
- Kit manager: (South Korea) Lee Min-ho
- Analysts: (South Korea) Lee Sun-gu, (South Korea) Kim Ki-hyun

Source: Official website

== Transfers ==
=== In ===
==== Pre-season ====
Date	Position	Player	Transferred from	Ref
Permanent Transfer
31 December 2025	DF	(South Korea) Ji Si-woo	(South Korea) Gwangju FC	End of loan
31 December 2025	DF	(South Korea) Kim Jun-yeong	(South Korea) Hwaseong FC	End of loan
31 December 2025	MF	(South Korea) Park Ju-yeong	(South Korea) Hwaseong FC	End of loan
31 December 2025	DF	(South Korea) Ahn Hyeon-beom	(South Korea) Suwon	End of loan
31 December 2025	DF	(South Korea) Jeong Tae-wook	(South Korea) FC Seoul	End of loan (Note: Jeong moved to FC Seoul for loan after returning from Australia.)
5 January 2026	FW	(South Korea) Kim Seung-sub	(South Korea) Jeju SK	Free
6 January 2026	GK	(South Korea) Lee Ju-hyeon	(South Korea) Bucheon FC 1995	Free
7 January 2026	DF	(South Korea) Cho Wi-je	(South Korea) Busan IPark	Undisclosed + (South Korea) Ahn Hyeon-beom
8 January 2026	DF	(South Korea) Park Ji-soo	(China) Wuhan Three Towns	Free
8 January 2026	MF	(South Korea) Kim Ha-jun	(South Korea) Seoul E-land	Loan Return
9 January 2026	FW	(Brazil) Bruno Mota	(South Korea) FC Anyang	Season loan
10 January 2026	MF	(Brazil) Oberdan	(South Korea) Jeonbuk Hyundai Motors	Undisclosed + (South Korea) Ji Si-woo
10 January 2026	MF	(South Korea) Kim Young-hwan	(South Korea) Chungbuk Cheongju	Undisclosed
12 January 2026	DF	(South Korea) Choi Jin-woong	(South Korea) Cheonan City	Free
12 January 2026	DF	(South Korea) Lee Sang-myung	(South Korea) Cheonan City	Free
15 January 2026	DF	(South Korea) Byeon Jun-soo	(South Korea) Gwangju (Note: Byeon moves to Gimcheon Sangmu FC for military service)	Free
16 January 2026	GK	(South Korea) Jeong Dae-yeong	(South Korea) Kyungnam University	Free
16 January 2026	DF	(South Korea) Kim Joo-hyung	(South Korea) Jinwi FC	Free
16 January 2026	MF	(South Korea) Woo Hyun-soo	(South Korea) Kwangwoon University	Free
16 January 2026	MF	(South Korea) Moon Jun-hyuk	(South Korea) Jeonju University	Free
16 January 2026	MF	(South Korea) Kwak Hee-byeok	(South Korea) Dankook University	Free
16 January 2026	MF	(South Korea) Lee Geon-hee	(South Korea) Jinwi FC	Free
16 January 2026	FW	(South Korea) Kim Do-hyun	(South Korea) Shintaein FC	Free
16 January 2026	FW	(South Korea) Ahn Tae-hoon	(South Korea) Bupyeong High School	Free
Loan Transfer

==== Mid-season ====
Date	Position	Player	Transferred from	Ref
Permanent Transfer
31 July 2026	FW	(Brazil) Italo	(Brazil) Chapecoense	Free
31 July 2026	MF	(Brazil) Dodô	(Brazil) Coimbra	Free
6 October 2026	MF	(South Korea) Jeon Byung-kwan	(South Korea) Gimcheon Sangmu FC	End of Military Duty
6 October 2026	MF	(South Korea) Lee Soo-bin	(South Korea) Gimcheon Sangmu FC	End of Military Duty
Loan Transfer
2 July 2026	FW	(Lithuania) Gytis Paulauskas	(South Korea) Jeju SK	Season loan

=== Out ===
==== Pre-season ====
Date	Position	Player	Transferred to	Ref
Permanent Transfer
1 December 2025	MF	(South Korea) Choi Chul-soon	N.A.	Retire
21 December 2025	MF	(South Korea) Han Kook-young	(South Korea) Daegu	Free
24 December 2025	MF	(South Korea) Park Jae-young	(South Korea) Seoul E-land	Free
24 December 2025	DF	(South Korea) Lee Jae-jun	(South Korea) Yongin	Free
26 December 2025	MF	(South Korea) Lee Gyu-dong	(South Korea) Yongin	Free
31 December 2025	DF	(South Korea) Hong Jeong-ho	(South Korea) Suwon Samsung Bluewings	Free
31 December 2025	DF	(South Korea) Yoon Joo-young	(South Korea)	Free
31 December 2025	DF	(South Korea) Hwang Jung-gu	(South Korea)	Free
31 December 2025	MF	(South Korea) Kwon Chang-hoon	(South Korea) Jeju	Free
31 December 2025	MF	(South Korea) Lee Jun-ho	(South Korea) Cheonan City	Free
31 December 2025	MF	(South Korea) Kim Min-jae	(South Korea) FC Mokpo	Free
31 December 2025	FW	(South Korea) Song Min-kyu	(South Korea) FC Seoul	Free
31 December 2025	FW	(South Korea) Sung Jin-young	(South Korea) Paju	Free
31 December 2025	FW	(South Korea) Kang Hyeon-jong	(South Korea) Dangjin Citizen	Free
3 January 2026	MF	(South Korea) Park Jin-seop	(China) Zhejiang	Free
7 January 2026	DF	(South Korea) Ahn Hyun-beom	(South Korea) Busan IPark	Exchange for (South Korea) Cho Wi-je
8 January 2026	GK	(South Korea) Kim Jeong-hoon	(South Korea) FC Anyang	Free
10 January 2026	DF	(South Korea) Ji Si-woo	(South Korea) Pohang Steelers	Exchange for (Brazil) Oberdan
20 January 2026	FW	(South Korea) Jeon Jin-woo	(England) Oxford (E2)	Free
21 January 2026	DF	(South Korea) Jeong Tae-wook	(South Korea) Incheon United	Free
Loan Transfer
7 April 2025	MF	(South Korea) Jeon Byung-kwan	(South Korea) Gimcheon Sangmu FC	Military Duty
7 April 2025	MF	(South Korea) Lee Soo-bin	(South Korea) Gimcheon Sangmu FC	Military Duty
19 January 2026	DF	(South Korea) Byeon Jun-soo	(South Korea) Gimcheon Sangmu FC	Military Duty

==== Mid-season ====
Date	Position	Player	Transferred to	Ref
Permanent Transfer
24 August 2026	MF	(South Korea) Kim Ye-geon	(Serbia) Red Star Belgrade	undisclosed
Loan Transfer
17 June 2026	MF	(South Korea) Kim Young-hwan	(South Korea) Incheon United	Season loan
8 July 2026	FW	(South Korea) Kim Du-hyun	(South Korea) Chungbuk Cheongju	Season loan
10 July 2026	MF	(South Korea) Jin Tae-Ho	(South Korea) Yongin FC	Season loan
7 August 2026	MF	(Brazil) Oberdan	(Japan) Fagiano Okayama	KRW 2.1 billion

== Friendly matches ==
Win Draw Loss

=== Tour of Marbella (11 Jan - 14 Feb) ===
24 January 2026	Jeonbuk Hyundai Motors (South Korea)	1–1	(Czech Republic) SK Sigma Olomouc	Marbella, Spain
	Kim Seung-seob 16'		Péter Baráth 3'

31 January 2026	Jeonbuk Hyundai Motors (South Korea)	0–2	(Canada) Toronto FC	Marbella, Spain
		Report	Đorđe Mihailović 8'; Richie Laryea 57'

4 February 2026	Jeonbuk Hyundai Motors (South Korea)	cancelled	(Canada) Vancouver Whitecaps	Marbella, Spain
				Stadium: Banús Fotball Center

8 February 2026	Jeonbuk Hyundai Motors (South Korea)	2–1	(Sweden) Malmö FF	Marbella, Spain
	Maeng Seong-woong 58'; Tiago Orobó 87'	Report	Arnor Sigurdsson 51'	Stadium: Banús Fotball Center

12 February 2026	Jeonbuk Hyundai Motors (South Korea)	1–1	(Ukraine) FC Metalist Kharkiv	Marbella, Spain

== Competitions ==
=== K League 1 ===
==== Matches ====
As usual, the league season will be played with 38 matches split in two stages. After 33 league matches between the 12 participating teams, the teams are split into the Final Round (Top 6 teams, which aims to won an AFC Champions spot) and Relegation Round (Bottom 6 teams, that aims to survive relegation).

1 March 2026 1	Jeonbuk Hyundai Motors	2–3	Bucheon	Jeonju
	Lee Dong-jun 13', 54'; Lee Seung-woo (yellow card) 45'	Report	Jefferson 26', 90+7' (pen.); Jhon Montaño 83' (yellow card) 90+12'; Patrick Wiilliam (yellow card) 17'; Shin Jae-won (yellow card) 57'	Stadium: Jeonju World Cup Stadium; Attendance: 20,681; Referee: Seol Tae-hwan

8 March 2026 2	Gimcheon Sangmu	1–1	Jeonbuk Hyundai Motors	Gimcheon
	Hong Yun-sang 50'; Kim Min-kyu (yellow card) 71'	Report	Bruno Mota 90+2'; Kim Tae-hwan (yellow card) 90+6'	Stadium: Gimcheon Stadium; Attendance: 3,323; Referee: Shin Yong-jun

14 March 2026 3	Gwangju	0–0	Jeonbuk Hyundai Motors	Gwangju
	Gwon Seong-yoon (yellow card) 9'; Hólmbert Aron Friðjónsson (yellow card) 57'; Ju Se-jong (yellow card) 80'	Report	Tiago Orobó (yellow card) 43'; Kang Sang-Yun (yellow card) 69'; Cho Wi-je (yellow card) 77'	Stadium: Gwangju Football Stadium; Attendance: 7,006; Referee: Song Min-seok

18 March 2026 4	Jeonbuk Hyundai Motors	2–1	FC Anyang	Jeonju
	Kim Jeong-hoon 10' (o.g.); Bruno Mota 87'; Kang Sang-yoon (yellow card) 40'; Tiago Orobo (yellow card) 55'; Cho Wi-je (yellow card) 75'	Report	Un Kim 27'; Lee Jin-yong (yellow card) 55'; Ji-Hun Kang (yellow card) 90'	Stadium: Jeonju World Cup Stadium; Attendance: 6,650; Referee: Ko Hyung-jin

21 March 2026 5	Daejeon Hana Citizen	0–1	Jeonbuk Hyundai Motors	Daejeon
	Joao Victor (yellow card) 35'; Cho Sung-gwon (yellow card) 78'	Report	Lee Dong-Jun 45+3'; Kim Jin-gyu (yellow card) 42'; Cho Wi-je (yellow card) 68'; Kim Ha-jun (yellow card) 90+4'	Stadium: Daejeon World Cup Stadium; Attendance: 12,550; Referee: Seol Tae-hwan

4 April 2026 6	Jeonbuk Hyundai Motors	2–0	Ulsan HD	Jeonju
	Cho Wi-je 10'; Lee Seung-woo 90+4'; Kim Tae hwan (yellow card) 57'; Kim Yeong-bin (yellow card) 89'	Report	Lee Gyu-sung (yellow card) 21'; Lee Jae-Ik (yellow card) 57'; Cho Hyun taek (yellow card) 90'	Stadium: Jeonju World Cup Stadium; Attendance: 20,532; Referee: Kim Jong-hyeok

11 April 2026 7	FC Seoul	1–0	Jeonbuk Hyundai Motors	Seoul
	Patryk Klimala 90+5'	Report	Kim Tae hwan (yellow card) 83'	Stadium: Seoul World Cup Stadium; Attendance: 34,068; Referee: Park Byeong-jin

18 April 2026 8	Gangwon	1–1	Jeonbuk Hyundai Motors	Gangneung
	Mo Jae-hyeon 57' (yellow card) 32'; Song Jun-seok (yellow card) 24'; Choi Byeong-chan (yellow card) 38'; Lee Gi-hyuk (yellow card) 48'	Report	Tiago Orobo 34'; Lee Seung-woo (yellow card) 38'; Oberdan (yellow card) 43'; Cho Wi-je (yellow card) 90'	Stadium: Gangneung Stadium; Attendance: 7,725; Referee: Song Min-seok

21 April 2026 9	Jeonbuk Hyundai Motors	1–2	Incheon United	Jeonju
	Cho Wi-je 14'	Report	Lee Myung-joo 41' (pen.); Lee Dong-ryul 60'; Choi Seung-gu (yellow card) 43'; Lee Chung-yong (yellow card) 73'; Lee Tae-hee (yellow card) 81'; Park Ho Min (yellow card) 83'; Lee Ju-yong (yellow card) 90+1'	Stadium: Jeonju World Cup Stadium; Attendance: 8,074; Referee: Kim Jong-hyeok

26 April 2026 10	Jeonbuk Hyundai Motors	3–2	Pohang Steelers	Jeonju
	Kim Young-bin 2' (yellow card) 37'; Kim Ha-jun 45' (yellow card) 65'; Kang Sang-yoon 90+5'; Bruno Mota (yellow card) 62'; Lee Seung-woo (yellow card) 88'	Report	Lee Ho-jae 41' (pen.), 67' (pen.); Jeon Min-gwang (yellow card) 51'	Stadium: Jeonju World Cup Stadium; Attendance: 14,501; Referee: Chae Sang Hyeop

2 May 2026 11	Jeju SK	0–2	Jeonbuk Hyundai Motors	Seogwipo
	Julien Celestine (yellow card) 56'	Report	Kim Jin-gyu 37'; Tiago Orobo 90+4'; Lee Sang-myung (yellow card) 51'	Stadium: Jeju World Cup Stadium; Attendance: 8,568; Referee: Song Min-seok

5 May 2026 12	Jeonbuk Hyundai Motors	4–0	Gwangju	Jeonju
	Oberdan 43'; Kim Seung-sub 50'; Tiago Orobó 87'; Lee Seung-woo 90+8' (pen.); Lee Sang-myung (yellow card) 85'	Report	Park Jeong-in (yellow card) 5'; Kim Jin-ho (yellow card) 45+2'; Hólmbert Friðjónsson (yellow card) 82'; Kwon Sung-yun (yellow card) 90+5'	Stadium: Jeonju World Cup Stadium; Attendance: 20,364; Referee: Kim Dae-yong

10 May 2026 13	FC Anyang	1–1	Jeonbuk Hyundai Motors	Anyang
	Airton 53'; Lee Tae-heui (yellow card) 50'	Report	Lee Seung-woo 76' (yellow card) 81'	Stadium: Anyang Stadium; Attendance: 10,026; Referee: Kim Jong-hyuk

13 May 2026 14	Bucheon	0–0	Jeonbuk Hyundai Motors	Bucheon
	Rodrigo Bassani (red card) 5'; Vitor Gabriel (yellow card) 37'; Kim Jin-ho (yellow card) 45+2'; Kim Hyung-Geun (yellow card) 78'	Report	Cho Wi-je (yellow card) 15'; Kim Jin-gyu (yellow card) 30'; Kim Tae hyeon (yellow card) 40'; Shin Jae-won (yellow card) 84'	Stadium: Bucheon Stadium; Attendance: 6,066; Referee: Choi Cheol-jun

17 May 2026 15	Jeonbuk Hyundai Motors	1–0	Gimcheon Sangmu	Jeonju
	Tiago Orobó 90+6'; Kim Yeong-bin (yellow card) 84'	Report	Lee Kang-hyun (yellow card) 66'; Baek Jong-beom (yellow card) 90+3'	Stadium: Jeonju World Cup Stadium; Attendance: 31,417; Referee: Chae Sang Hyeop

4 July 2026 16	Jeonbuk Hyundai Motors	1–2	Gangwon	Jeonju
	Lee Seung-woo 76'	Report	Song Jun-seok 25'; Lee You-hyeon 53'	Stadium: Jeonju World Cup Stadium; Attendance: 15,551; Referee: Kim Chong-hyuk

11 July 2026 17	Ulsan HD	1–3	Jeonbuk Hyundai Motors	Ulsan
	Yago Cariello 89'; Darijan Bojanic (yellow card) 53'	Report	Kim Jin-gyu 31' (yellow card) 63'; Lee Seung-woo 60' (yellow card) 48'; Kim Ye-geon 79'; Lee Dong-Jun (yellow card) 64'; Oberdan (yellow card) 90+4'	Stadium: Ulsan Munsu Football Stadium; Attendance: 20,173; Referee: Kim Dae-yong

18 July 2026 18	Incheon United	1–0	Jeonbuk Hyundai Motors	Incheon
	Gerso Fernandez 44'	Report	Park Ji-su (yellow card) 61'	Stadium: Incheon Football Stadium; Attendance: 12,984; Referee: Park Byeong-jin

21 July 2026 19	Jeonbuk Hyundai Motors	0–0	Daejeon Hana Citizen	Jeonju
	Lee Seung-woo (penalty missed) 45+7; Cho Wi-je (yellow card) 66'; Kim Tae hwan (yellow card) 90+6'	Report		Stadium: Jeonju World Cup Stadium; Attendance: 10,258; Referee: Choi Hyun-jai

26 July 2026 20	Pohang Steelers	0–2	Jeonbuk Hyundai Motors	Pohang
	Cho Sang-hyeok (yellow card) 57'	Report	Gytis Paulauskas 43'; Kim Yeong-bin 90+8'; Kim Jin-gyu (yellow card) 22'	Stadium: Pohang Steel Yard; Attendance: 13,147; Referee: Shin Yong-jun

1 August 2026 21	Jeonbuk Hyundai Motors	0–0	FC Seoul	Jeonju
	Cho Wi-je (yellow card) 24'; Oberdan (yellow card) 32'	Report	Song Min-kyu (yellow card) 26'; Son Jeong-beom (yellow card) 84'	Stadium: Jeonju World Cup Stadium; Attendance: 23,081; Referee: Kim Jong-hyun

8 August 2026 22	Jeonbuk Hyundai Motors	1–3	Jeju	Jeonju
	Lee Seung-woo 58'; Maeng Seong-ung (yellow card) 66'; Andrea Compagno (yellow card) 82'	Report	Emerson Negueba 23' (pen.), 70', 90+8'; Yu In-soo (yellow card) 81'	Stadium: Jeonju World Cup Stadium; Attendance: 10,246; Referee: Song Min-seok

16 August 2026 23	Bucheon	3–2	Jeonbuk Hyundai Motors	Bucheon
	Sung Ye-geon 8'; Kim Jong-woo 14'; Jefferson 55'; Kim Hyeon-yeob (yellow card) 44'; Patrick William (yellow card) 83'; Hong Sung-wook (yellow card) 90+9'	Report	Choi Woo-jin 59'; Park Ji-soo 79'; Kim Yeong-bin (yellow card) 1'; Lee Yeong-jae (yellow card) 90+4'	Stadium: Bucheon Stadium; Attendance: 9,268; Referee: Lee Dong-jun

22 August 2026 24	Jeonbuk Hyundai Motors	1–0	Ulsan HD	Jeonju
	Bruno Mota 55' (yellow card) 57'; Choi Woo-jin (yellow card) 28'; Lee Seung-woo (yellow card) 74'; Kim Young-bin (yellow card) 90+11'	Report	Sim Sang-min (yellow card) 51'; Jung Seung-hyun (yellow card) 59'; Seo Myung-gwan (yellow card) 90+5'	Stadium: Jeonju World Cup Stadium; Attendance: 18,841; Referee: Ko Hyung-jin

25 August 2026 25	Gimcheon Sangmu	0–0	Jeonbuk Hyundai Motors	Gimcheon
	Kim Tae-hwan (yellow card) 74'; Kim Tae hyeon (yellow card) 90'; Kang Sang-Yun (yellow card) 90+3'	Report		Stadium: Gimcheon Stadium; Attendance: 2,684; Referee: Choi Cheol-jun

30 August 2026 26	Incheon United	1–1	Jeonbuk Hyundai Motors	Incheon
	Gerso 88'; Kim Myung-Sun (yellow card) 4'; Lee Myeong-Ju (yellow card) 24'; Seo Jae-min (yellow card) 90'	Report	Lee Seung-woo 82'; Kim Yeong-bin (yellow card) 2'; Kim Tae hwan (yellow card) 24'; Choi Woo-jin (yellow card) 90+6'	Stadium: Incheon Football Stadium; Attendance: 11,056; Referee: Kim Dae-yong

5 September 2026 27	Jeonbuk Hyundai Motors	2–0	Pohang Steelers	Jeonju
	Lee Seung-woo 59' (yellow card) 39'; Tiago Orobo 62'; Lee Dong-Jun (yellow card) 16'; Joao Gamboa (yellow card) 68'	Report		Stadium: Jeonju World Cup Stadium; Attendance: 11,716; Referee: Shin Yong-jun

9 September 2026 28	Gangwon	1–1	Jeonbuk Hyundai Motors	Gangneung
	Abdallah Khalaihal 59'; Mo Jae-hyeon (yellow card) 35'; Kim Gun-hee (yellow card) 38'	Report	Italo 14'; Kim Yeong-bin (yellow card) 37'; Cho Wi-je (yellow card) 75'	Stadium: Gangneung Stadium; Attendance: 5,066; Referee: Choi Cheol-jun

12 September 2026 29	Jeonbuk Hyundai Motors	1–2	FC Seoul	Jeonju
	Bruno Mota 26'; Kim Tae hyeon (yellow card) 38'	Report	Patryk Klimala 3', 90+6'	Stadium: Jeonju World Cup Stadium; Attendance: 18,821; Referee: Lee Dong-jun

20 September 2026 30	Jeonbuk Hyundai Motors	2–2	Gwangju	Jeonju
	Tiago Orobo 35', 78'; Kim Yeong-bin (yellow card) 51'	Report	Kim Tae hyeon 44' (o.g.); John Iredale 90+1'; Shin Chang-moo (yellow card) 28'	Stadium: Jeonju World Cup Stadium; Attendance: 11,239; Referee: Park Byeong-jin

9 October 2026 31	Daejeon Hana Citizen	2–1	Jeonbuk Hyundai Motors	Daejeon
	Masatoshi Ishida 56'; Diogo de Oliveira 85'	Report	Tiago Orobó 45'; Cho Wi-je (yellow card) 44'	Stadium: Daejeon World Cup Stadium; Attendance: 15,420; Referee: Kim Dae-yong

18 October 2026 32	Jeonbuk Hyundai Motors	3–2	Jeju	Jeonju
	Tiago Orobó 32', 60'; Kim Young-bin 47'; Lee Dong-Jun (yellow card) 27'	Report	Emerson Negueba 45+10' (pen.), 90+1' (pen.); Kwon Gi-min (yellow card) 23'; Kim Ryun-sung (yellow card) 70'	Stadium: Jeonju World Cup Stadium; Attendance: 11,469; Referee: Song Min-seok

24 October 2026 33	FC Anyang	1–1	Jeonbuk Hyundai Motors	Anyang
	Kim Woon 45+1'; Kim Ji-hun (yellow card) 89'	Report	Tiago Orobo 90+2' (yellow card) 89'; Lee Sang-myung (yellow card) 50'; Kim Jin-gyu (yellow card) 84'	Stadium: Anyang Stadium; Attendance: 9,126; Referee: Ko Hyung-jin

31 October 2026 34	Jeonbuk Hyundai Motors	0–0	Daejeon Hana Citizen	Jeonju
	Italo (yellow card) 45'	Report	Kang Yun-sung (yellow card) 70'; Cho Sung-gwon (yellow card) 80'	Stadium: Jeonju World Cup Stadium; Attendance: 7,654; Referee: Shin Yong-jun

8 November 2026 35	Gangwon	3–2	Jeonbuk Hyundai Motors	Gangneung
	Shin Min-ha 13' (yellow card) 8'; Mo Jae-hyeon 39'; Park Sang-hyeok 90+4'	Report	Andrea Compagno 9' (pen.); Lee Dong-Jun 86'; Lee Yeong-jae (yellow card) 55'	Stadium: Gangneung Stadium; Attendance: 4,206; Referee: Choi Hyun-jae

21 November 2026 36	Jeonbuk Hyundai Motors	0–1	FC Seoul	Jeonju
	Anderson Oliveira 54'; Jeong Hyeon-woo (yellow card) 90+4'; Patryk Klimala (yellow card) 90+6'	Report		Stadium: Jeonju World Cup Stadium; Attendance: 8,411; Referee: Kim Dae-yong

28 November 2026 37	Ulsan HD	–	Jeonbuk Hyundai Motors	Ulsan
		Report		Stadium: Ulsan Munsu Football Stadium

6 December 2026 38	Jeonbuk Hyundai Motors	–	Incheon United	Jeonju
		Report		Stadium: Jeonju World Cup Stadium

Pos	Team	Pld	W	D	L	GF	GA	GD	Pts	Qualification or relegation (Note: Teams played each other three times (33 matches), before the league was split into two groups, the top six and the bottom six.)
4	Incheon United	36	14	10	12	46	38	+8	52	Qualification for Champions League Elite play-off round
5	Gangwon FC	36	12	15	9	45	37	+8	51	
6	Jeonbuk Hyundai Motors	36	12	13	11	45	37	+8	49	
7	Jeju SK	35	12	12	11	41	39	+2	48	
8	FC Anyang	36	11	14	11	43	51	−8	47	

Updated to match(es) played on 21 November 2026. Source: Soccerway K League
Rules for classification: 1) Points; 2) Goals scored; 3) Goal difference; 4) Wins; 5) Head-to-head points

=== 2026 K League Super Cup ===
21 February 2026	Jeonbuk Hyundai Motors	2–0	Daejeon Hana Citizen	Jeonju
	Bruno Mota 32'; Tiago Orobó 44'; Maeng Seong-ung (yellow card) 72'; Kim Tae-hyeon (yellow card) 74'; Park Ji-su (yellow card) 84'	Report	Diogo Oliveira (penalty missed) 90+7; Anton Kryvotsiuk (yellow card) 34'; Kim Bong-soo (yellow card) 74'; Kim Min-duk (yellow card) 81'	Stadium: Jeonju World Cup Stadium; Attendance: 17,937; Referee: Ko Hyung-jin

=== 2026–27 Korea Cup ===
19 August 2026 Round of 16	Jeonbuk Hyundai Motors	2–2 (a.e.t.) (3–5 p)	Dangjin Citizen (K3)	Jeonju
	Ryu Yeon-Joon 11'; Choi Si-on 50'	Report	Italo 20'; Han Seok-jin 65'	Stadium: Jeonju World Cup Stadium; Attendance: 2,516; Referee: Choi Kyu-hyun

=== 2026–27 AFC Champions League Elite ===
==== League stage ====
Win Draw Loss

Pos	Team	Pld	W	D	L	GF	GA	GD	Pts	Qualification
6	(Japan) Kyoto Sanga	4	2	1	1	6	3	+3	7	Advance to round of 16
6	(Malaysia) Johor Darul Ta'zim	4	2	1	1	6	3	+3	7	Advance to round of 16
8	(South Korea) Jeonbuk Hyundai Motors	4	2	1	1	6	5	+1	7	Advance to round of 16
9	(China) Beijing Guoan	4	2	1	1	10	10	0	7	
10	(South Korea) Daejeon Hana Citizen	4	1	1	2	2	4	−2	4	

Updated to match(es) played on 4 November 2026. Source: AFC
Rules for classification: 1) points; 2) goal difference; 3) number of goals scored; 4) number of matches won; 5) penalty shoot-out if only two teams remain tied and played each other on the final matchday 6) fair play ranking; 7) drawing of lots

15 September 2026 1	Jeonbuk Hyundai Motors (South Korea)	2–1	(Japan) Kashiwa Reysol	Jeonju, South Korea
	Tiago Orobó 49'; Italo 69'; Lee Seung-woo (yellow card) 87'; Kim Yeong-bin (yellow card) 87'; Kim Tae hyeon (yellow card) 87'	Report	Kenshin Yuba 30'; Nobuteru Nakagawa (yellow card) 32'; Koki Kumasaka (yellow card) 90+4'	Stadium: Jeonju World Cup Stadium; Attendance: 4,694; Referee: Alireza Faghani (Australia)

14 October 2026 2	Vissel Kobe (Japan)	2–0	(South Korea) Jeonbuk Hyundai Motors	Kobe, Japan
	Yuya Osako 12'; Yuya Kuwasaki 68'	Report		Stadium: Noevir Stadium Kobe; Attendance: 7,136; Referee: Ammar Mahfoodh (Bahrain)

25 October 2026 3	Beijing Guoan (China)	2–2	(South Korea) Jeonbuk Hyundai Motors	Beijing, China
	Jeremy Dudziak 34'; Wang Gang 52'; Boubacar Konte (yellow card) 69'	Report	Bruno Mota 2' (yellow card) 56'; Kim Yeong-bin 64' (yellow card) 33'; Kang Sang-Yun (yellow card) 75'	Stadium: Workers' Stadium; Attendance: 27,638; Referee: Mooud Bonyadifard (Iran)

3 November 2026 4	Jeonbuk Hyundai Motors (South Korea)	2–0	(Malaysia) Johor Darul Ta'zim	Jeonju, South Korea
	Bruno Mota 22' (yellow card) 58'; Italo 45+2' (pen.)	Report		Stadium: Jeonju World Cup Stadium; Attendance: 3,370; Referee: Khalid Al-Turais (Saudi Arabia)

25 November 2026 5	Kashima Antlers (Japan)	–	(South Korea) Jeonbuk Hyundai Motors	Kashima, Japan
				Stadium: Kashima Soccer Stadium

2 December 2026 6	Jeonbuk Hyundai Motors (South Korea)	–	(Japan) Gamba Osaka	Jeonju, South Korea
				Stadium: Jeonju World Cup Stadium

9 February 2027 7	Kyoto Sanga (Japan)	–	(South Korea) Jeonbuk Hyundai Motors	Kyoto, Japan
				Stadium: Kyoto Stadium

16 February 2027 8	Jeonbuk Hyundai Motors (South Korea)	–	(China) Shanghai Port	Jeonju, South Korea
				Stadium: Jeonju World Cup Stadium

== Team statistics ==
=== Appearances and goals ===
As of 21 November 2026

No.	Pos.	Player	K-League		Korea Cup		Korea Super Cup		2026–27 AFC Champions League		Total	
No.	Pos.	Player	Apps	Goals	Apps	Goals	Apps	Goals	Apps	Goals	Apps	Goals
1	GK	(South Korea) Lee Ju-hyun	1	0	1	0	0	0	0	0	2	0
2	DF	(South Korea) Kim Young-bin	31+1	3	0	0	1	0	4	1	37	4
3	DF	(South Korea) Yeon Je-un	3+6	0	1	0	0	0	1+1	0	12	0
4	DF	(South Korea) Cho Wi-je	25+2	2	0+1	0	0	0	1	0	29	2
5	DF	(South Korea) Park Ji-soo	12+3	1	1	0	1	0	3+1	0	21	1
6	MF	(South Korea) Maeng Seong-ung	8+12	0	0+1	0	1	0	2+1	0	25	0
7	FW	(South Korea) Lee Dong-jun	32+1	4	0	0	1	0	3	0	37	4
9	FW	(Brazil) Tiago Orobó	14+15	9	1	0	0+1	1	1+2	1	32	11
10	MF	(South Korea) Lee Seung-woo	16+19	8	0	0	0+1	0	1+3	0	39	8
11	MF	(South Korea) Kim Seung-sub	16+15	1	0	0	1	0	2	0	34	1
13	MF	(South Korea) Kang Sang-yoon	26+2	1	0+1	0	0	0	2+1	0	32	1
14	MF	(South Korea) Jeon Byung-kwan	0+1	0	0	0	0	0	0	0	1	0
15	DF	(South Korea) Kim Ha-jun	7+7	1	0	0	0	0	0	0	14	1
16	MF	(Portugal) João Gamboa	11+11	0	1	0	0	0	2+1	0	26	0
17	MF	(South Korea) Lee Soo-bin	0	0	0	0	0	0	0	0	0	0
19	FW	(South Korea) Park Ju-yeong	0+1	0	0	0	0	0	0	0	1	0
21	FW	(Ghana) Patrick Twumasi	0+1	0	0	0	0+1	0	0	0	2	0
22	DF	(South Korea) Kim Jun-yeong	0	0	0	0	0	0	0	0	0	0
23	DF	(South Korea) Kim Tae-hwan	23+1	0	0	0	1	0	1	0	26	0
24	DF	(South Korea) Lee Sang-myung	4+2	0	1	0	0	0	0	0	7	0
26	MF	(South Korea) Moon Jun-hyuk	0	0	0	0	0	0	0	0	0	0
27	DF	(South Korea) Hwang Seung-jun	0+1	0	0	0	0	0	1	0	2	0
28	MF	(South Korea) Lee Yeong-jae	10+17	0	1	0	0+1	0	2+2	0	33	0
29	GK	(South Korea) Gong Si-hyeon	0	0	0	0	0	0	0	0	0	0
30	MF	(Brazil) Dodô	1+6	0	0	0	0	0	0+2	0	9	0
31	GK	(South Korea) Song Bum-keun	35	0	0	0	1	0	4	0	40	0
33	MF	(South Korea) Han Seok-jin	0+1	0	0+1	1	0	0	0	0	2	1
34	MF	(South Korea) Eom Seung-min	0	0	0	0	0	0	0	0	0	0
36	MF	(South Korea) Jang Nam-ung	0	0	0	0	0	0	0	0	0	0
39	DF	(South Korea) Seo Jeong-hyeok	0	0	0	0	0	0	0	0	0	0
40	FW	(South Korea) Ahn Tae-hoon	0	0	0	0	0	0	0	0	0	0
42	MF	(South Korea) Woo Hyun-soo	0	0	0	0	0	0	0	0	0	0
44	DF	(South Korea) Kim Joo-hyung	0	0	0	0	0	0	0	0	0	0
47	MF	(South Korea) Lee Gun-hee	0	0	0	0	0	0	0	0	0	0
51	GK	(South Korea) Lee Han-gyeol	0	0	0	0	0	0	0	0	0	0
55	DF	(South Korea) Choi Jin-woong	0	0	0	0	0	0	0	0	0	0
66	DF	(South Korea) Choi Woo-jin	21+8	1	0	0	0	0	2	0	31	1
70	MF	(South Korea) Park Hyun-min	0	0	0	0	0	0	0	0	0	0
71	GK	(South Korea) Jeon Ji-wan	0	0	0	0	0	0	0	0	0	0
74	DF	(South Korea) Kim Soo-hyung	0	0	0	0	0	0	0	0	0	0
77	DF	(South Korea) Kim Tae-Hyun	18+4	0	1	0	1	0	2+1	0	27	0
79	FW	(South Korea) Kim Chang-hoon	0	0	0	0	0	0	0	0	0	0
80	DF	(South Korea) Kwak Hee-byeok	0	0	0	0	0	0	0	0	0	0
81	FW	(Lithuania) Gytis Paulauskas	4+3	1	1	0	0	0	0	0	8	1
88	MF	(South Korea) Yoon Hyun-seok	0	0	0	0	0	0	0	0	0	0
90	DF	(South Korea) Jeong Sang-woon	0	0	0	0	0	0	0	0	0	0
91	GK	(South Korea) Jeong Dae-yeong	0	0	0	0	0	0	0	0	0	0
92	FW	(South Korea) Kim Du-hyun	0	0	0	0	0	0	0	0	0	0
95	MF	(Brazil) Italo	9+7	1	1	1	0	0	2+2	2	21	4
96	FW	(Italy) Andrea Compagno	1+4	1	0+1	0	0	0	0+1	0	7	1
97	MF	(South Korea) Kim Jin-gyu	28+3	2	0	0	1	0	4	0	36	2
99	FW	(Brazil) Bruno Mota	17+9	4	0	0	1	1	3+1	2	31	7
Players featured on a match for the team, but left the club on loan transfer
8	FW	(Brazil) Oberdan	21	1	0	0	1	0	0	0	22	1
17	MF	(South Korea) Jin Tae-Ho	0+3	0	0	0	0+1	0	0	0	4	0
73	MF	(South Korea) Kim Ye-geon	1+7	1	1	0	0	0	0	0	9	1
