= Italy (disambiguation) =

Italy is a European country.

Italy may also refer to:

- Italy (geographical region)
- Italian Peninsula
- Roman Italy
- Kingdom of Italy (Holy Roman Empire), a constituent kingdom of the Holy Roman Empire
- Italian Republic (Napoleonic), a French client state in northern Italy 1802–1805
- Kingdom of Italy (Napoleonic), a French client state 1805–1814
- Kingdom of Italy, an independent and unified Italian state 1861–1946
- Imperial Italy (fascist), an ambitious project envisioned by Fascist Italy
- Italy, New York, USA, a town
- Italy, Texas, USA, a town
- "Italy" (Everybody Loves Raymond), a television episode
- "Italy", a poem by Patti Smith from her 1978 book Babel (book)
- I.T.A.L.Y., a 2008 Filipino film
- A main character from the anime Hetalia: Axis Powers.

== See also ==
- Air Italy (disambiguation)
- Little Italy (disambiguation)
- Italia (disambiguation)
- Italian (disambiguation)
- Italo (disambiguation)
- Kingdom of Italy (disambiguation)
- Imperial Italy (disambiguation)
- Italian people (disambiguation)
