= Itala =

Itala may refer to:

- Itala (company), an Italian car manufacturer
  - Itala Special, a special custom-built Grand Prix race car
- Itala (given name), an Italian given name
- Itala, Sicily, a municipality in Sicily
- Itala Film, an Italian film company
- Itala Game Reserve, in KwaZulu-Natal, South Africa
- a term for the Vetus Latina or "Old Latin" translation of the Bible
- Adale, formerly Itala, a city in Somalia

== See also ==
- Jaakko Itälä (1933–2017), Finnish politician
- Ville Itälä, a Finnish politician
- Italia (disambiguation)
- Italo (disambiguation)
