= Italia (disambiguation) =

Italia is the name of Italy in the Italian language and several other languages.

Italia may also refer to:

- Roman Italy (Italia in Latin), the Italian peninsula during Roman times

== People ==
- Italia (name), list of people and fictional characters named Italia

== Places ==
- Italia, Florida, United States, an unincorporated community
- Italia Glacier, Alberto de Agostini National Park, Chile
- Italia Valley, King George Island, South Shetland Islands
- 477 Italia, an asteroid

== Military ==
- Italia-class ironclad, a class of two battleships built for the Italian Regia Marina (Royal Navy) in the 1870s and 1880s
  - Italian ironclad Italia, an Italian ironclad launched in 1880 and stricken in 1921
- Italian battleship Italia (1943), an Italian battleship launched in 1937 as Littorio she was renamed Italia in 1943
- Italian training ship Italia, a brigantine, active as a sail training vessel for the Italian Navy
- 1st Bersaglieri Division "Italia", a World War II Italian unit
- nickname of the 29th Waffen Grenadier Division of the SS (1st Italian), a World War II German unit

== Transportation ==
- Italia (airship), a semi-rigid airship used in a series of flights around the North Pole in 1928
- Italia Line, a passenger shipping line
- SS Italia (1904), an ocean liner converted by the French Navy to an armed boarding steamer and sunk in 1917
- MS Italia (1948), a passenger liner launched in 1928 as MS Kungsholm and renamed Italia from 1948 to 1964
- MS Italia (1965), a cruise ship launched in 1965
- Italia (yacht), a 12-metre class yacht
- Ferrari 458 Italia, a sports car first produced in 2009
- Hudson Italia, an automobile styling study and a limited production two-door compact coupé marketed in the 1954 and 1955 design years
- Triumph Italia, a sports car built between 1959 and 1962
- Italia, a sports car produced by Intermeccanica from 1966 to 1972
- Avenida Italia, a major thoroughfare in Montevideo, Uruguay
- Italia metro station, a railway station in Catania, Sicily, Italy

== Music ==
- Italia (album), a 2007 album by Chris Botti
- "Italia" (song), a 2020 song by French rapper Jul
- "Italia", a track on the soundtrack for the 1999 film The Talented Mr. Ripley
- Italia Guitars, a guitar manufacturer

== Other uses ==
- Italia Independent Group, a holding company
- Edifício Itália, a skyscraper in Brazil
- Deportivo Italia, a Venezuelan football club
- Italia (grape), a white table grape variety
- Italia, another name for the UFO group Siderella

== See also ==
- Italia 1, Italia 2, Italian television channels
- Italy (disambiguation)
- Italian (disambiguation)
- List of ships named Italia
