= List of ships named Italia =

Many ships have been named Italia including:

- Italian battleship Italia (1880), an Italian ironclad launched in 1880 and stricken in 1921
- Italian battleship Italia (1943), an Italian battleship launched in 1937 as Littorio and renamed Italia in 1943
- MS Italia (1948), a passenger liner launched in 1928 as MS Kungsholm and named Italia from 1948 to 1964
- MS Italia (1965), a cruise ship launched in 1965 (later operated as Princess Italia)
- SS Italia (1904), an ocean liner converted by the French Navy to an armed boarding steamer and sunk in 1917
- Italia (yacht), a 12-metre class yacht which competed in the 1987 Louis Vuitton Cup
- Italian training ship Italia, a 1993 sail ship

== See also ==
- Italia (disambiguation)
