= Little Italy, West Virginia =

Little Italy, West Virginia may refer to the following places in the U.S. state of West Virginia:

- Little Italy, Clay County, West Virginia
- Little Italy, Randolph County, West Virginia
