= Italo (given name) =

- Gender: Male

Italo is a male Italian given name. Notable people with the name include:

- Ítalo Argentino Lúder (1916–2008), Argentine politician
- Italo Balbo (1896–1940), politician
- Italo Bocchino (born 1957), politician
- Italo Brancucci (1904–1958), composer
- Italo "Babe" Caccia (1917–2009), American college athlete, coach, and administrator
- Italo Calvino (1923–1985), writer
- Italo Campanini (1845–1896), singer
- Italo Casini (1892–?), bobsledder
- Italo Chelini (1914–1972), baseball player
- Italo Cappabianca (1936–2001), politician
- Italo Dell'Oro (born 1953), Auxiliary Bishop of Galveston-Houston
- Ítalo Ferreira (born 1994), Brazilian surfer
- Italo Gardoni (1821–1882), singer
- Italo Gariboldi (1879–1970), soldier
- Italo Gismondi (1887–1974), archæologist
- Italo Montemezzi (1875–1952), composer
- Italo Moscati (born 1937), writer
- Italo Mus (1892–1967), painter
- Ítalo Perea (born 1993), boxer
- Italo Petrelli, bobsledder
- Ítalo Piaggi (1936–2012), soldier
- Italo Righi (born 1959), politician
- Ítalo Rossi (1931–2011), actor
- Italo Santelli (1866–1945), fencer
- Italo Sarrocco (1898–2007), soldier
- Italo Scanga (1932–2001), artist
- Italo Svevo (1861–1928), writer
- Italo Tajo (1915–1993), singer
- Italo Viglianesi (1916–1995), politician
- Italo Zanzi (born 1974)
- Italo Zilioli (born 1941), cyclist
- Italo Zingarelli (1930–2000), film producer
- Italo Zucchelli (born 1965), fashion designer

== Footballers ==
- Italo (footballer, born 1991), Italo Henrique Juvino da Silva, Brazilian left back
- Ítalo (footballer, born 1996), Ítalo de Carvalho Rocha Lima, Brazilian forward
- Ítalo (footballer, born February 2002), Ítalo Fernando Assis Gonçalves, Brazilian centre-back
- Italo (footballer, born October 2002), Italo de Vargas da Rosa, Brazilian forward
- Italo Allodi (1928–1999), Italian footballer
- Ítalo Estupiñán (1952–2016), Ecuadorian forward
- Italo Galbiati (born 1937), Italian midfielder and manager
- Italo Mattioli (born 1985), Italian forward
- Italo Vassalo (born 1940), Ethiopian forward

== See also ==
- Italus
- Italo (disambiguation)
- Italy (disambiguation)
