= Impero =

Impero (Italian for "empire") may refer to:

- Impero (river), stream in Liguria
- Italian Empire, the colonial empire of Italy
- Italian battleship Impero, warship of World War II
- Cinema Impero, a movie theatre in Asmara, Eritrea
- Imperial Line (Linea dell'Impero), air route of Italian Africa

== See also ==
- Imperial Italy (disambiguation)
