= Little Italy (disambiguation) =

Little Italy is a general name for an ethnic enclave populated primarily by Italians or people of Italian ancestry, usually in an urban neighborhood.

Little Italy may also refer to:

== Places ==
=== Australia ===
- Little Italy, Melbourne

=== Canada ===
- Little Italy, Edmonton, Alberta
- Little Italy, Montreal
- Little Italy, Ottawa
- Little Italy, Toronto
- Little Italy, Vancouver
- Little Italy, Windsor
- Little Italy, Winnipeg

=== United Kingdom ===
- Little Italy, London

=== United States of America ===
- Little Italy, Arkansas
- Little Italy, San Diego, California
- Little Italy, Bridgeport, Connecticut
- Little Italy, Waterbury, Connecticut
- Little Italy, Wilmington, Delaware
- Little Italy, Chicago, Illinois
- Little Italy, Baltimore, Maryland
- Little Italy, Omaha, Nebraska
- Little Italy, Paterson, New Jersey
- Little Italy, Manhattan, New York
- Little Italy, Syracuse, New York
- Little Italy, Connellsville, Pennsylvania
- Little Italy, Cleveland, Ohio
- Little Italy, Clay County, West Virginia
- Little Italy, Randolph County, West Virginia

== Arts, entertainment, and media ==
- Little Italy (1921 film), an American comedy film directed by George Terwilliger and written by Tom McNamara and Peter Milne
- Little Italy (1978 film), an Italian "poliziottesco"-comedy film directed by Bruno Corbucci and the fourth chapter in the Nico Giraldi film series
- Little Italy (2018 film), an English-language romantic comedy film starring Emma Roberts and Hayden Christensen
- "Little Italy" (Drag Race Italia), a 2022 television episode
- "Little Italy" (Northern Exposure), a 1995 television episode

== See also ==
- Maggiano's Little Italy
- In Little Italy, a 1909 film directed by D. W. Griffith
- Lil Italy, an American rapper
