= Cho Yu-min =

South Korean footballer (born 1996)

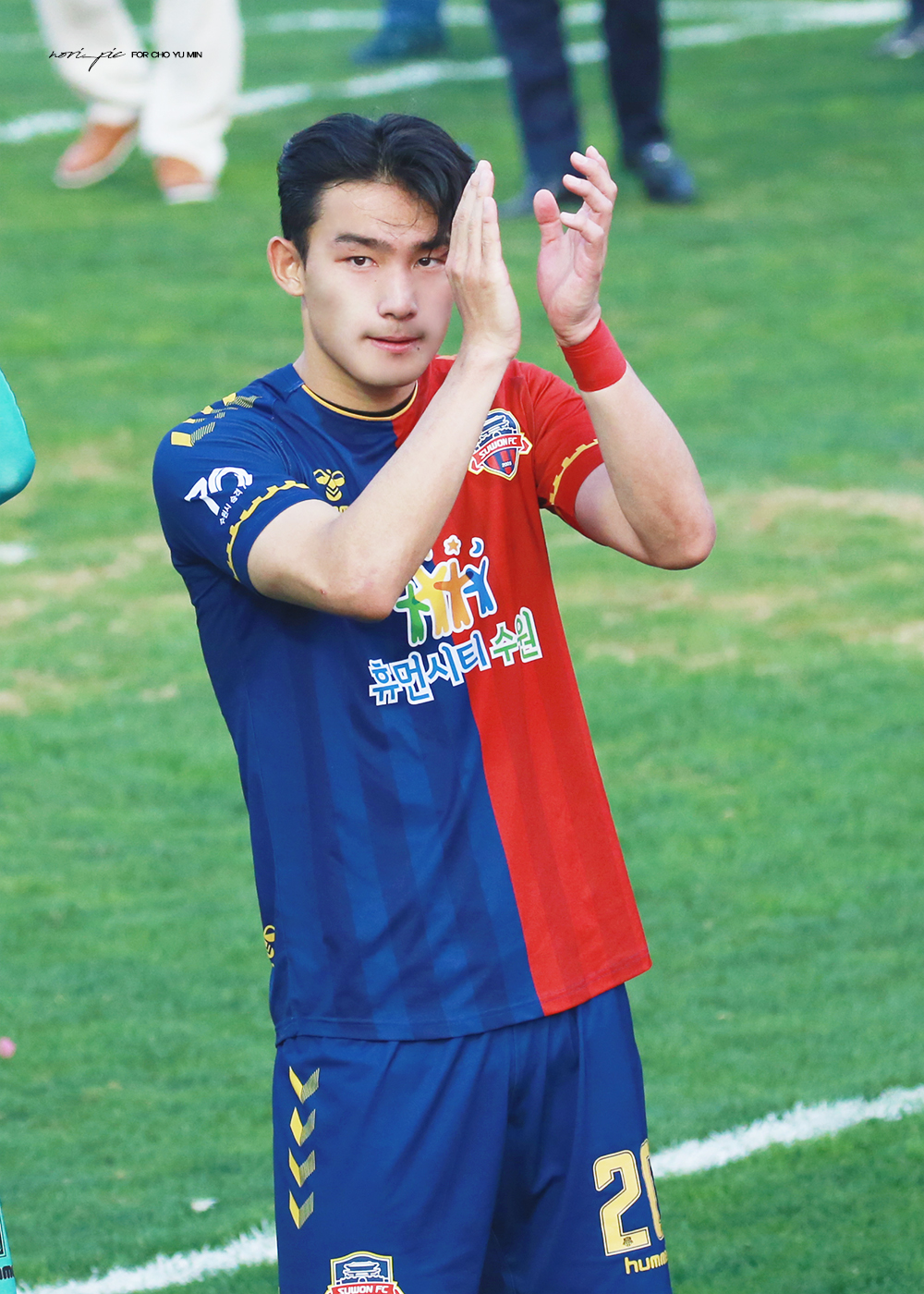
- Cho in May 2019

Personal information
- Full name: Cho Yu-min
- Date of birth: 17 November 1996 (age 29)
- Place of birth: Daegu, South Korea
- Height: 1.85 m (6 ft 1 in)
- Positions: Centre-back; defensive midfielder

Team information
- Current team: Tokyo Verdy
- Number: 96

Youth career
- 2012–2014: Cheongju Daeseong High School

College career
Years	Team	Apps	(Gls)
2015–2017	Chung-Ang University		

Senior career*
Years	Team	Apps	(Gls)
2018–2021	Suwon FC	111	(8)
2022–2023	Daejeon Hana Citizen	54	(8)
2024–2026	Sharjah	51	(2)
2026–	Tokyo Verdy	5	(0)

International career^{‡}
2017	South Korea Universiade	5	(0)
2018	South Korea U23	11	(0)
2022–	South Korea	19	(0)
Medal record
Men's football
Representing South Korea
Asian Games
Gold medal – first place	2018 Jakarta-Palembang	Team
EAFF Championship
Runner-up	2022 Japan	Team
- * Club domestic league appearances and goals as of 7 November 2026 ‡ National team caps and goals as of 30 May 2026

- Cho Yu-min
- Hangul: 조유민
- Hanja: 曺侑珉
- RR: Jo Yumin
- MR: Cho Yumin

Cho Yu-min (Korean: 조유민; born 17 November 1996) is a South Korean football centre-back or defensive midfielder who plays for the J1 League club Tokyo Verdy and the South Korea national team.

== Club career ==
=== Suwon FC ===
At Suwon FC, Cho Yu-min quickly established himself as a key player. He played in both K League 2 and K League 1, showcasing his versatility and defensive skills. In the 2021 season, Suwon FC competed in K League 1, and Cho played a crucial role in maintaining the team's position in the league. He was also part of the team that achieved promotion to K League 1 in 2020, contributing significantly to their success.

== International career ==
On 12 November 2022, Cho Yu-min was named in the South Korea squad for the 2022 FIFA World Cup. In May 2026, he was selected for South Korea's 26-man squad for the 2026 FIFA World Cup. He was later forced to withdraw from the tournament because of injury and was replaced by Cho Wi-je on 31 May.

== Career statistics ==
=== Club ===
As of 7 November 2026

Club	Season	League			Cup		League Cup		Continental		Other		Total	
Club	Season	Division	Apps	Goals	Apps	Goals	Apps	Goals	Apps	Goals	Apps	Goals	Apps	Goals
Suwon FC	2018	K League 2	26	0	2	1	—		—		—		28	1
Suwon FC	2019	K League 2	31	2	2	1	—		—		—		33	3
Suwon FC	2020	K League 2	23	2	0	0	—		—		1 (Note: Appearances in K League promotion-relegation play-offs)	0	24	2
Suwon FC	2021	K League 1	31	4	0	0	—		—		—		31	4
Suwon FC	Total		111	8	4	2	—		—		1	0	116	10
Daejeon Hana Citizen	2022	K League 2	33	6	0	0	—		—		2	1	35	7
Daejeon Hana Citizen	2023	K League 1	21	2	0	0	—		—		—		21	2
Daejeon Hana Citizen	Total		54	8	0	0	—		—		2	1	56	9
Sharjah	2023–24	UAE Pro League	13	2	1	0	—		—		—		14	2
Sharjah	2024–25	UAE Pro League	19	0	4	0	3	0	12 (Note: Appearances in AFC Champions League Two)	0	—		38	0
Sharjah	2025–26	UAE Pro League	19	0	1	0	2	0	7 (Note: Appearances in AFC Champions League Elite)	0	1 (Note: Appearance in UAE Super Cup)	0	30	0
Sharjah	Total		51	2	6	0	5	0	19	0	1	0	82	2
Tokyo Verdy	2026–27	J1 League	5	0	0	0	0	0	—		—		5	0
Career total			221	18	10	2	5	0	19	0	4	1	259	21

== Personal life ==
On 18 January 2022 it was confirmed that Cho and South Korean singer Park So-yeon are getting married after 3 years of dating. The wedding was to be held in November, when Cho's season would end.

Later, it was announced the wedding ceremony in November has been postponed until next year, due to Cho joining the national team and is planning to focus for the 2022 FIFA Qatar World Cup. However, the couple has already registered their marriage and are already a legal couple.

== Honours ==
Sharjah

- AFC Champions League Two: 2024–25
- UAE Super Cup: 2025
