= Italian people (disambiguation) =

Italian people may refer to:

- in terms of ethnicity: all ethnic Italians, in and outside of Italy
- in territorial terms: people of Italy, entire population of Italy, historical or modern
- in modern legal terms: all people who possess the citizenship of Italy

== Other uses ==
- Italian People's Party (1919), former political party in Italy
- Italian People's Party (1994), former center-leftist political party in Italy
- Italian People's Party for Freedom, designation for Il Popolo della Libertà (party) in Italy
- Italian People's Bakery, in Trenton, New Jersey
- In the Name of the Italian People, an Italian film (1971)

== See also ==
- Italian (disambiguation)
- Italy (disambiguation)
