= The Italian =

The Italian may refer to:

- The Italian (1915 film), a silent film by Reginald Barker
- The Italian (2005 film), a Russian film by Andrei Kravchuk
- The Italian (Radcliffe novel), a novel by Ann Radcliffe
- The Italian (Vassalli novel), a novel by Sebastiano Vassalli
- The Italian (album), an album by Patrizio Buanne

== See also ==
- Italian (disambiguation)
