= Andrea Compagno =

Italian footballer (born 1996)

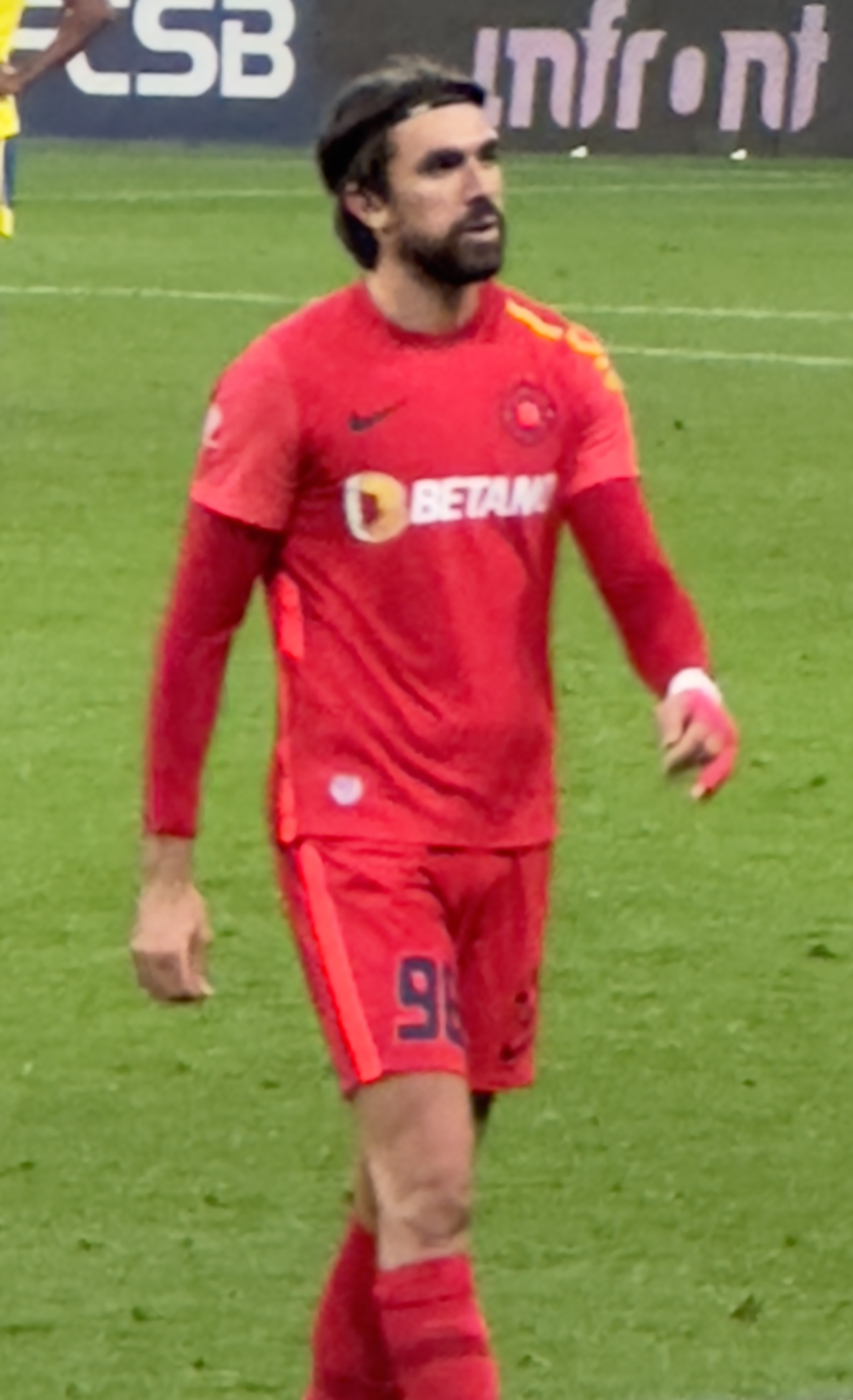
- Compagno with FCSB in 2023

Personal information
- Full name: Andrea Compagno
- Date of birth: 22 April 1996 (age 30)
- Place of birth: Palermo, Italy
- Height: 1.95 m (6 ft 5 in)
- Position: Striker

Team information
- Current team: Jeonbuk Hyundai Motors
- Number: 96

Youth career
- 2006–2011: Palermo
- 2011–2014: Catania
- 2016: Torino

Senior career*
Years	Team	Apps	(Gls)
2014–2015	Catania	0	(0)
2015	→ Due Torri (loan)	14	(2)
2015–2016	Pinerolo	15	(1)
2016	Pinerolo	6	(0)
2017	Argentina Arma	16	(5)
2017	Borgosesia	14	(1)
2018	Nuorese	16	(1)
2018–2020	Tre Fiori	37	(33)
2020–2022	FC U Craiova	57	(24)
2022–2024	FCSB	45	(19)
2024	Tianjin Jinmen Tiger	26	(17)
2025–	Jeonbuk Hyundai Motors	31	(14)
- * Club domestic league appearances and goals as of 8 November 2025

Andrea Compagno (born 22 April 1996) is an Italian professional footballer who plays as a striker for K League 1 club Jeonbuk Hyundai Motors.

== Career ==
=== Early career / San Marino ===
Born in Sicily, Compagno spent his formative years in the local academies of Palermo and Catania. He started out his senior career with several Serie D teams—namely Due Torri, Pinerolo, Argentina Arma, Borgosesia and Nuorese.

In 2018, Compagno moved to San Marino with Tre Fiori. He netted 37 goals from 41 matches in all competitions, and also won the Coppa Titano and the Super Coppa Sammarinese during his stint.

=== Romania ===
In the summer of 2020, Compagno joined Romanian Liga II side FC U Craiova. He amassed seven goals in 22 appearances during his first season, as they became league champions and achieved promotion to the top flight.

On 29 August 2022, FC U Craiova announced that Compagno was acquired by fellow Liga I team FCSB for a fee of €1.5 million plus 10% interest.

=== Tianjin Jinmen Tiger ===
On 19 February 2024, Compagno joined Chinese Super League club Tianjin Jinmen Tiger.

=== Jeonbuk Hyundai Motors ===
On 6 February 2025, Compagno joined K League 1 club Jeonbuk Hyundai Motors.

== Career statistics ==
=== Club ===
As of match played 8 November 2026

Appearances and goals by club, season and competition
Club	Season	League			National cup (Note: Includes Coppa Italia Serie D, Coppa Titano, Cupa României, Chinese FA Cup, Korean FA Cup)		Continental		Total	
Club	Season	Division	Apps	Goals	Apps	Goals	Apps	Goals	Apps	Goals
Due Torri (loan)	2014–15	Serie D	14	2	—		—		14	2
Pinerolo	2015–16	Serie D	15	1	—		—		15	1
Pinerolo	2016–17	Serie D	6	0	—		—		6	0
Pinerolo	Total		21	1	—		—		21	1
Argentina Arma	2016–17	Serie D	16	5	—		—		16	5
Bergosesia	2017–18	Serie D	14	1	1	0	—		15	1
Nuorese	2017–18	Serie D	16	1	—		—		16	1
Tre Fiori	2018–19	Campionato Sammarinese	24	22	—		—		24	22
Tre Fiori	2019–20	Campionato Sammarinese	13	11	2	3	2 (Note: Appearances in UEFA Europa League)	1	17	15
Tre Fiori	Total		37	33	2	3	2	1	41	37
FC U Craiova	2020–21	Liga II	22	7	3	2	—		25	9
FC U Craiova	2021–22	Liga I	28	12	1	0	—		29	12
FC U Craiova	2022–23	Liga I	7	5	—		—		7	5
FC U Craiova	Total		57	24	4	2	—		61	26
FCSB	2022–23	Liga I	27	15	0	0	5 (Note: Appearances in UEFA Europa Conference League)	1	32	16
FCSB	2023–24	Liga I	18	4	1	0	4	0	23	4
FCSB	Total		45	19	1	0	9	1	55	20
Tianjin Tiger	2024	Chinese Super League	26	17	3	2	—		29	19
Jeonbuk Hyundai Motors	2025	K League 1	26	13	5	3	2 (Note: Appearances in AFC Champions League 2)	2	33	18
Jeonbuk Hyundai Motors	2026	K League 1	5	1	0	0	0 (Note: Appearances in AFC Champions League 2)	0	5	1
Career total			277	117	16	10	13	4	306	131

== Honours ==
Tre Fiori

- Coppa Titano: 2018–19
- Super Coppa Sammarinese: 2019–20

FC U Craiova

- Liga II: 2020–21

FCSB

- Liga I: 2023–24

Jeonbuk Hyundai Motors

- K League 1: 2025
- Korean FA Cup: 2025

Individual

- Gazeta Sporturilor Foreign Player of the Year: 2022
- Gazeta Sporturilor Player of the Month: August 2022
- FC U Craiova Player of the Year: 2020–21, 2021–22
- Campionato Sammarinese top scorer: 2018–19
