= Air Italy =

Air Italy may refer to:

- Air Italy (2005–2018)
- Air Italy (2018–2020)
