= Kingdom of Italy (disambiguation) =

The Kingdom of Italy in a modern context usually refers to the most recent state of this name (1861–1946), the predecessor state of the modern Italian Republic. A Kingdom of Italy existed almost uninterruptedly from 476 to 1946, and it is divided into multiple eras:

- The Kingdom of Odoacer (476–493)
- The Ostrogothic Kingdom (493–553), officially known as the "Kingdom of Italy" (Regnum Italiae)
- The Kingdom of the Lombards (568–774), sometimes called the "Kingdom of all Italy" (Regnum totius Italiae)
- The Kingdom of Italy (774–962), constituent kingdom of the Carolingian Empire and Middle Francia; independent realm after 855
- The Kingdom of Italy (962–1801), constituent kingdom of the Holy Roman Empire
- The Kingdom of Italy (1805–1814), established by Napoleon and in personal union with the First French Empire
- Fascist Italy (1922–1943), the Kingdom of Italy during its period under Fascist rule

== See also ==
- King of Italy
- History of Italy
- List of historic states of Italy
