= Italo =

Italo may refer to:

- Italo-, a prefix indicating a relation to Italy or Italians
  - Italo Nuovo Trasporto Viaggiatori, an Italian high-speed rail operator
- Italo (given name), given name

== Film ==
- Italo (film), a 2014 comedy film
- Italo crime, a genre of crime film

== Music genres ==
- Italo disco
- Italo dance
- Italo house

== Other uses ==
- Triavio Italo, an Italian aircraft design
