= Jeonbuk Hyundai Motors =

South Korean football club

- Full name: Jeonbuk Hyundai Motors Football Club 전북 현대 모터스 축구단
- Nickname: 녹색전사 (Green Warriors)
- Founded: 1994; 32 years ago (as Chonbuk Dinos)
- Ground: Jeonju World Cup Stadium
- Capacity: 34,207
- Owner: Hyundai Motor Company
- Chairman: Chung Eui-sun
- Head coach: Chung Jung-yong
- League: K League 1
- 2025: K League 1, 1st of 12 (champions)
- Website: hyundai-motorsfc.com
Home colours	Away colours

Jeonbuk Hyundai Motors FC (Korean: 전북 현대 모터스 FC), commonly known as Jeonbuk (전북), is a South Korean professional football club based in Jeonju, North Jeolla Province that competes in the K League 1, the top tier of South Korean football. Jeonbuk have won the K League a record ten times, including five consecutive titles between 2017 and 2021, and the Korea Cup six times, which is also a joint-record. At international level, the club have won the AFC Champions League twice, in 2006 and 2016. Jeonbuk have also made two appearances in the FIFA Club World Cup, most recently in the 2016 edition. The club's home ground is the Jeonju World Cup Stadium.

== History ==
=== Beginnings ===
Jeonbuk Hyundai Motors' predecessor was founded in January 1993 under the name Wansan Pumas. Oh Hyung-keun was the founder of the team, the first to be named after its home location in K League history. However, they failed to raise enough funds and the club went bankrupt before they could take their place in the K League. Many people wanted to keep the club and Bobae Ltd., a local alcohol producer, offered financial support to the club. In 1994, they joined the K League after renaming as Chonbuk Buffalo, but ran into financial problems and were dissolved after the final match of the 1994 season.

In 1994, South Korea was in the campaign to host the 2002 FIFA World Cup, so Hyundai Motors, who was in the process of building Hyundai Jeonju Plant, took over the Buffaloes' players and formed a new club called Chonbuk Dinos on 12 December 1994. The K League's official policy is that Chonbuk Buffalo and Chonbuk Dinos (later renaming as Jeonbuk Hyundai Motors) are two different clubs.

=== Domination in K League and success in Asia (2005–2021) ===
Since 1994, Jeonbuk had not seriously challenged for the K League title, often languishing in mid-table. After Choi Kang-hee was appointed manager in July 2005, Jeonbuk won the Korean FA Cup in December of that year. In 2006, Jeonbuk finished a disappointing eleventh in the K League, however, they won their first AFC Champions League title. En route to the final, they defeated the Japanese champions, Gamba Osaka, and China's Shanghai Shenhua, as well as Ulsan Horang-i, the South Korean champions, in the semi-finals. They then triumphed 3–2 on aggregate over Al-Karamah, the champions of Syria, in the final.

As AFC Champions League winners, Jeonbuk Hyundai Motors qualified for the 2006 FIFA Club World Cup. They lost their first game 1–0 to América in the quarter-finals on 10 December, however, they defeated Auckland City 3–0 on 14 December and finished fifth in the tournament. In 2009, Jeonbuk became the Korean champions for the first time after beating Seongnam Ilhwa 3–1 on aggregate in the K League Championship. They repeated the feat in 2011 and won their second domestic title after defeating Ulsan Hyundai 4–2 in the final. The same year, they also reached the AFC Champions League final, where they lost to Al-Sadd after a penalty shoot-out.

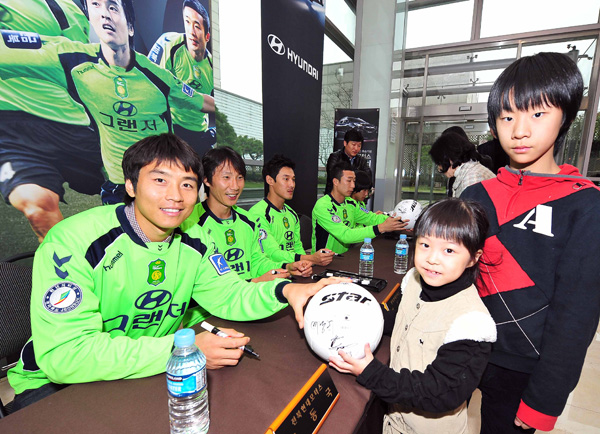
Jeonbuk players signing autographs in their first title winning season

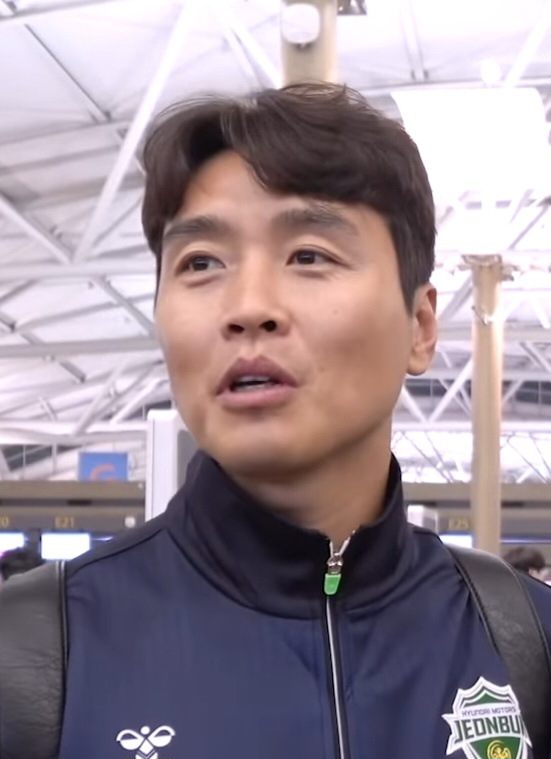
Lee Dong-gook is the all-time top scorer for Jeonbuk and the K League

With significant investment from its parent company, Jeonbuk completed its state of the art Yulsori Clubhouse (club training center) in nearby Wanju County in 2013. Hyundai's generous support and Choi Kang-hee's aggressive play style led to the club dominating the K League for the next several years, with the club winning the 2014 and 2015 titles.

2016 was a tumultuous year for Jeonbuk. The club won their second AFC Champions League title after defeating Al-Ain 3–2 on aggregate, but the team came under fire in the domestic front for allegedly bribing referees through a scout. The club was fined and had nine points deducted from their 2016 league campaign, resulting in rivals FC Seoul claiming the title. Despite being champions of Asia, the club's participation in the 2017 AFC Champions League was revoked due to this incident.

The club continued to enjoy success in the K League, securing the next five consecutive titles. Additionally, they won the 2020 Korean FA Cup, defeating rising rivals Ulsan over two legs to mark their first-ever domestic double.

=== Decline (2022–2024) ===
The 2022 season marked the beginning of Jeonbuk's decline, dramatically losing the title to now chief rivals Ulsan by three points. The club, however, won the 2022 Korean FA Cup. The following year led to even poorer results, with the club finishing fourth in the 2023 season, their lowest league finish since 2008. Jeonbuk also failed to win a second consecutive FA Cup, being defeated by Pohang Steelers in the 2023 final. The fourth-place finish and failure to win the FA Cup meant the club was unable to participate in the rebranded 2024–25 AFC Champions League Elite.

Jeonbuk's decline escalated in the 2024 season, with the club finishing tenth and flirting with relegation for the first time in its history. The club narrowly avoided relegation to K League 2 by defeating Seoul E-Land in the promotion-relegation play-offs.

=== Return to power (2025–present) ===
In December 2024, Jeonbuk appointed Uruguayan manager Gus Poyet in a bid to achieve its former glory. In the club's first competitive match under Poyet, they defeated Thai side Port FC 4–0 away in the 2024–25 AFC Champions League Two, including two goals by new signing Andrea Compagno.

Under Poyet's leadership, Jeonbuk decisively won the 2025 K League 1 with five games to spare to clinch their record-extending tenth title and the first since 2021. During the season, they went on a 22-match undefeated streak, which is tied for the third-longest run in K League history. Jeonbuk also won the 2025 Korea Cup after defeating Gwangju FC in the final, securing their second double and first since 2020. However, two days after the final, Poyet stepped down as manager after his assistant Mauricio Taricco received a suspension.

Jeonbuk won its first trophy under new manager Chung Jung-yong when it defeated Daejeon Hana Citizen in the 2026 K League Super Cup, which was held for the first time since 2006.

== Supporters and rivalries ==
=== Supporters ===
Jeonbuk is the most popular football team and the second most popular sports team in South Korea behind only Kia Tigers of the KBO League. The club draws over two million supporters from all over the country and particularly from the Honam region. It has almost half a million followers on TikTok, boosted by the international popularity of former player Cho Gue-sung, who scored a brace in South Korea's group stage match versus Ghana in the 2022 FIFA World Cup. The club's main supporters group is called the Mad Green Boys, who sit at the North Stand of their stadium.

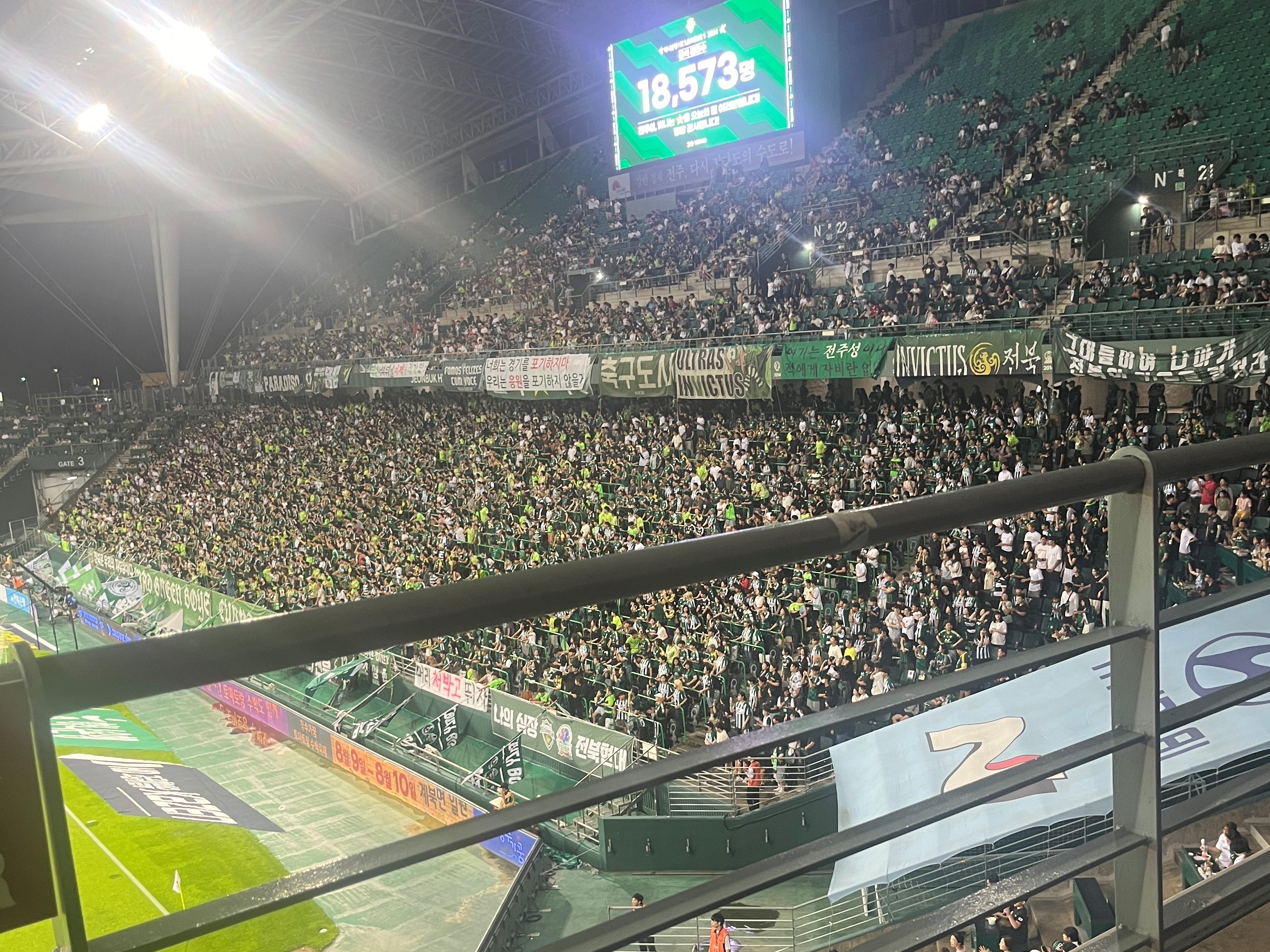
Mad Green Boys in a home league game in 2024

=== Rivalries ===
==== Seoul Metropolitan Area clubs ====
Jeonbuk shares strong rivalries with FC Seoul (Jeonseol Match) and Suwon Samsung Bluewings (Gongseongjeon), the two most popular football clubs of the Seoul Metropolitan Area. The three-way rivalry these teams share represent the business rivalry between their parent companies Hyundai, LG, and Samsung–three of the largest business conglomerates in South Korea. Their rivalry was the most intense in the 2010s, when Jeonbuk came to dominate the K League while Seoul and Suwon declined.

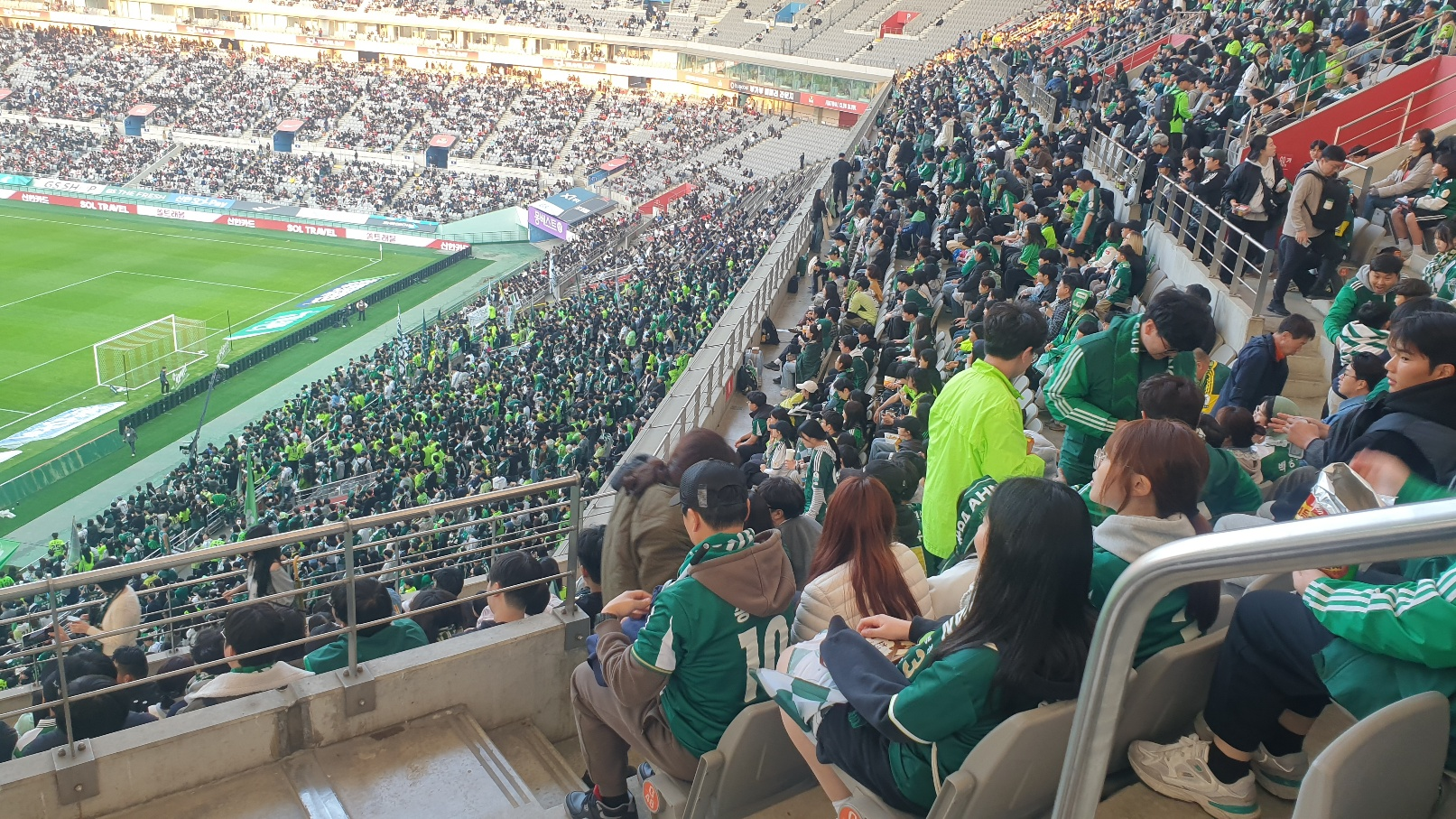
Jeonbuk away supporters at the Seoul World Cup Stadium in 2025

Jeonbuk supporters set a team record of over 7,600 away fans at a league match against Seoul on 3 May 2025, highlighting their rivalry.

==== Hyundai Derby ====
Since the late 2010s, Jeonbuk's biggest league rival came to be Ulsan HD. Ulsan became the main club to challenge Jeonbuk's domestic dominance, finally breaking the club's five-year title winning streak in 2022. The matches between the two giants, now seen as the biggest derby in the country, continue to be very consequential for both clubs. In 2025, all 32,560 available seats of the Jeonju World Cup Stadium sold out for the first time in the club's history for their fixture against Ulsan, which Jeonbuk won 3–1.

Although the parent companies of the two clubs share the Hyundai name, they are legally separate business entities.

==== International ====
In the 2010s, Jeonbuk developed an intense international rivalry with Chinese side Guangzhou Evergrande from frequently playing each other in the AFC Champions League. The two teams were the dominant sides of their respective leagues and their most frequent representatives on the continental stage. Several South Korean players and staff members were instrumental to Guangzhou's victories over Jeonbuk and in Asia, as the club and other Chinese Super League teams used their large financial backing to attract South Korean talent.

Guangzhou disbanded in 2025, making the rivalry defunct.

== Stadium ==
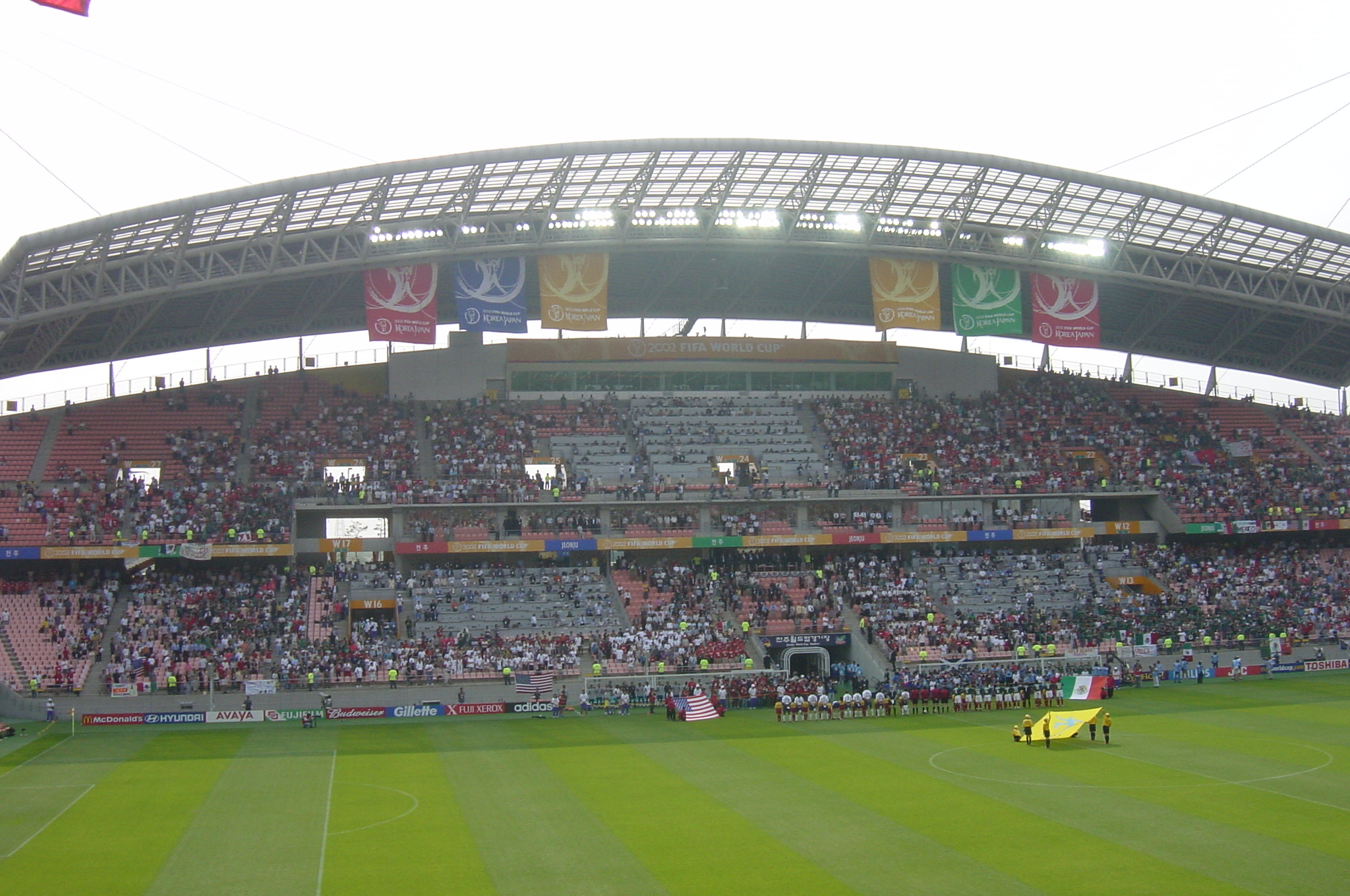
Jeonju World Cup Stadium during the 2002 FIFA World Cup

Jeonbuk has played its home games at the Jeonju World Cup Stadium since 2002, after the stadium was completed the year before. It has a capacity of 34,207 seats. Their previous home ground was the Jeonju Sports Complex Stadium. The club's reserve team, Jeonbuk Hyundai Motors N, plays at the Wanju Public Stadium in nearby Wanju County.

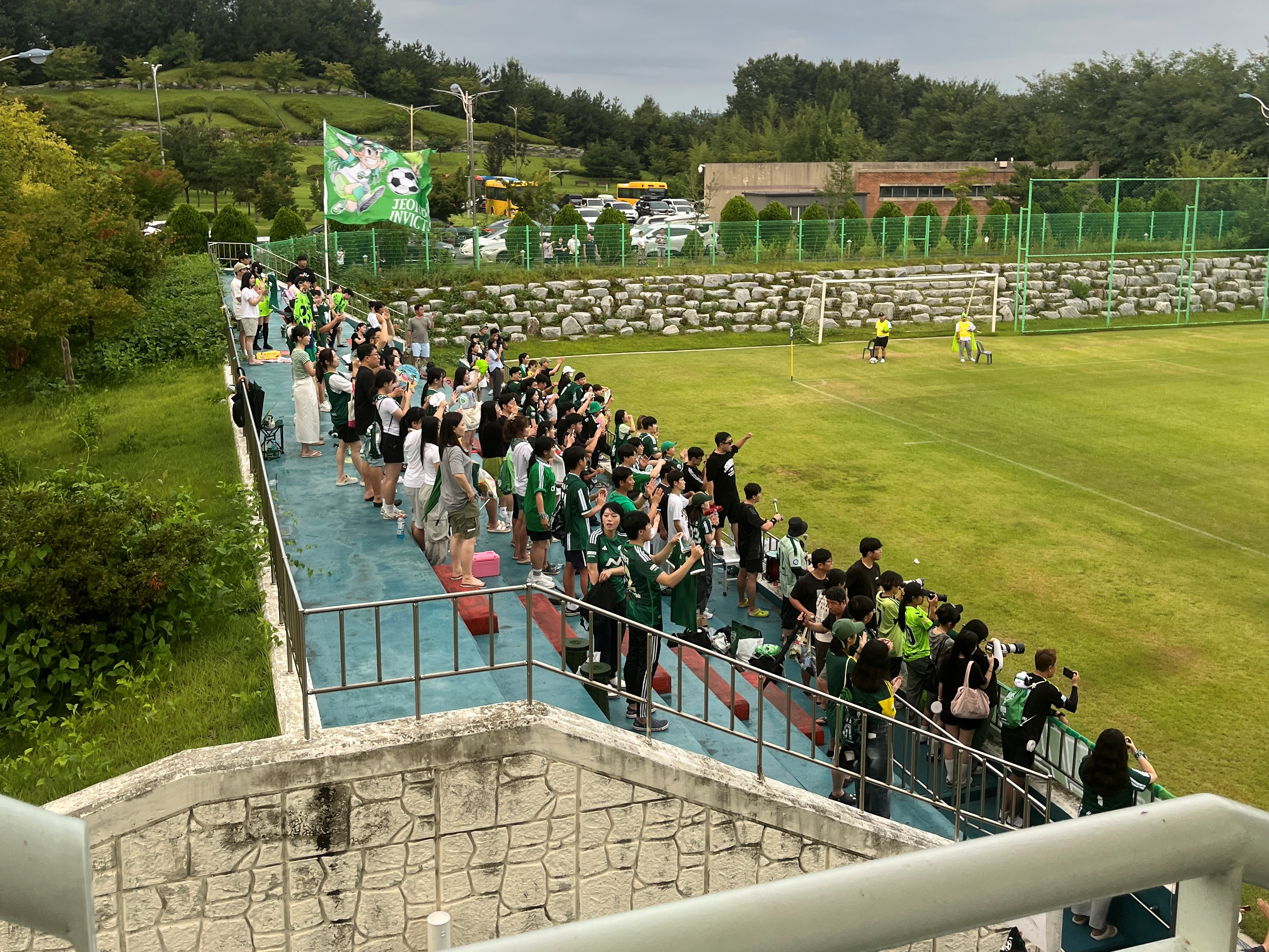
Fans supporting Jeonbuk's reserve team at the Wanju Public Stadium

Jeonbuk owns one of the most modern club training facilities in Asia: the Yulsori Clubhouse in Bongdong-eup, Wanju. The state-of-the-art training center, modeled after the training facilities of top European clubs, includes a large hydrotherapy room, indoor and outdoor training grounds, personal sleeping rooms, a gym, and a cafeteria.

== Players ==
=== Current squad ===
As of 8 October 2026

Note: Flags indicate national team as defined under FIFA eligibility rules; some limited exceptions apply. Players may hold more than one non-FIFA nationality.

No.	Pos.	Nation	Player
1	GK	KOR	Lee Ju-hyun
2	DF	KOR	Kim Young-bin
3	DF	KOR	Yeon Je-un
4	DF	KOR	Cho Wi-je
5	DF	KOR	Park Ji-soo (vice-captain)
6	MF	KOR	Maeng Seong-ung
7	FW	KOR	Lee Dong-jun
9	FW	BRA	Tiago Orobó
10	FW	KOR	Lee Seung-woo
11	FW	KOR	Kim Seung-sub
13	MF	KOR	Kang Sang-yoon
14	FW	KOR	Jeon Byung-kwan
15	DF	KOR	Kim Ha-jun
16	MF	POR	João Gamboa
17	MF	KOR	Lee Soo-bin
19	FW	KOR	Park Ju-yeong
21	FW	GHA	Patrick Twumasi
22	DF	KOR	Kim Jun-yeong
23	DF	KOR	Kim Tae-hwan (captain)
24	DF	KOR	Lee Sang-myung
26	MF	KOR	Moon Joon-hyuk
27	DF	KOR	Hwang Seung-jun
28	MF	KOR	Lee Yeong-jae
29	GK	KOR	Gong Si-hyeon
30	MF	BRA	Dodô
31	GK	KOR	Song Bum-keun (vice-captain)
33	FW	KOR	Han Seok-jin
34	FW	KOR	Um Seung-min

No.	Pos.	Nation	Player
36	MF	KOR	Jang Nam-ung
37	DF	KOR	Han Jae-bin
39	DF	KOR	Seo Jeong-hyeok
40	FW	KOR	An Tae-hoon
42	MF	KOR	Woo Hyun-soo
44	DF	KOR	Kim Ju-hyung
47	MF	KOR	Lee Gun-hee
51	GK	KOR	Lee Han-gyeol
55	DF	KOR	Choi Jin-woong
61	MF	KOR	Koo Gyo-bin
62	DF	KOR	Kim Tae-young
63	MF	KOR	Han Seung-min
66	DF	KOR	Choi Woo-jin
70	MF	KOR	Park Hyun-min
71	GK	KOR	Jeon Ji-wan
74	DF	KOR	Kim Su-hyung
77	DF	KOR	Kim Tae-hyun (vice-captain)
79	FW	KOR	Kim Chang-hoon
80	DF	KOR	Kwak Hee-byeok
81	FW	LTU	Gytis Paulauskas (on loan from Jeju SK)
88	MF	KOR	Yun Hyun-seok
90	FW	KOR	Jeong Sang-woon
91	GK	KOR	Jeong Dae-young
95	FW	BRA	Italo (on loan from Chapecoense)
96	FW	ITA	Andrea Compagno
97	MF	KOR	Kim Jin-gyu
98	FW	KOR	Lim Jun-hwi
99	FW	BRA	Bruno Mota (on loan from FC Anyang)

=== Out on loan ===
Note: Flags indicate national team as defined under FIFA eligibility rules; some limited exceptions apply. Players may hold more than one non-FIFA nationality.

No.	Pos.	Nation	Player
—	DF	KOR	Byeon Jun-soo (at Gimcheon Sangmu for military service)
—	MF	KOR	Jin Tae-ho (at Yongin FC)

No.	Pos.	Nation	Player
—	MF	KOR	Kim Young-hwan (at Incheon United)
—	FW	KOR	Kim Doo-hyeon (at Chungbuk Cheongju)

=== Retired numbers ===
20 – Lee Dong-gook
25 – Choi Chul-soon

== Backroom staff ==
=== Coaching staff ===
- Head coach: (South Korea) Chung Jung-yong
- Goalkeeping coach: (South Korea) Hwang Hee-hoon
- Fitness coach: Vacant
- Reserve team manager: (South Korea) An Dae-hyun
- Reserve team coaches: (South Korea) Kim Kwang-suk, (South Korea) Jung Boo-sun, (South Korea) Woo Jung-ha

Source: Official website

=== Support staff ===
- Team doctor: (South Korea) Song Ha-heon
- Physiotherapist: (Brazil) Gilvan Oliveira
- Medical trainers: (South Korea) Kim Byeong-seon, (South Korea) Lee Gyu-yeol, (South Korea) Noh Sang-keun
- Reserve team medical trainer: (South Korea) Park Jeong-hun
- Analyst: (South Korea) Lee Sun-gu
- Reserve team analyst: (South Korea) Park Jun-wan
- Kit manager: (South Korea) Choi Jae-hyeok
- Interpreters: (South Korea) Kim James Min-su, (South Korea) Pyo Seok-hwan

Source: Official website

== Honours ==
=== Domestic ===
- K League 1
  - Winners (10): 2009, 2011, 2014, 2015, 2017, 2018, 2019, 2020, 2021, 2025
  - Runners-up (3): 2012, 2016, 2022
- Korea Cup
  - Winners (6): 2000, 2003, 2005, 2020, 2022, 2025
  - Runners-up (3): 1999, 2013, 2023
- Korean League Cup
  - Runners-up (1): 2010
- K League Super Cup
  - Winners (2): 2004, 2026
  - Runners-up (2): 2001, 2006
- Korean President's Cup
  - Runners-up (1): 1999 (reserve team)

=== International ===
- AFC Champions League
  - Winners (2): 2006, 2016
  - Runners-up (1): 2011
- Asian Cup Winners' Cup
  - Runners-up (1): 2002

== Managers ==
No.	Name	From	To	Season(s)
1	(South Korea) Cha Kyung-bok	1994/11/26	1996/12/05	1995–1996
2	(South Korea) Choi Man-hee	1996/12/06	2001/07/18	1997–2001
C	(South Korea) Nam Dae-sik	2001/07/19	2001/10/03	2001
3	(South Korea) Cho Yoon-hwan	2001/10/04	2005/06/12	2001–2005
C	(South Korea) Kim Hyung-yul	2005/06/13	2005/07/10	2005
4	(South Korea) Choi Kang-hee	2005/07/04; 2013/06/28	2011/12/21; 2018/12/02	2005–2011; 2013–2018
C	(South Korea) Lee Heung-sil	2012/01/05	2012/12/12	2012
C	(Brazil) Fábio Lefundes	2012/12/20	2013/06/01	2013
C	(South Korea) Shin Hong-gi	2013/06/25	2013/06/27	2013
5	(Portugal) José Morais	2018/12/03	2020/12/06	2019–2020
6	(South Korea) Kim Sang-sik	2020/12/22	2023/05/04	2021–2023
C	(South Korea) Kim Do-heon	2023/05/04	2023/06/08	2023
7	(Romania) Dan Petrescu	2023/06/09	2024/04/06	2023–2024
C	(South Korea) Park Won-jae	2024/04/07	2024/05/26	2024
8	(South Korea) Kim Do-heon	2024/05/27	2024/12/16	2024
9	(Uruguay) Gus Poyet	2024/12/24	2025/12/08	2025
10	(South Korea) Chung Jung-yong	2025/12/24	present	2026–

== Season-by-season records ==
=== Domestic record ===
Season	Division	Tms.	Pos.	Korea Cup
1995	1	8	7	—
1996	1	9	5	Quarter-final
1997	1	10	6	Round of 16
1998	1	10	6	Round of 16
1999	1	10	7	Runners-up
2000	1	10	4	Winners
2001	1	10	9	Semi-final
2002	1	10	7	Quarter-final
2003	1	12	5	Winners
2004	1	13	6	Quarter-final
2005	1	13	12	Winners
2006	1	14	11	Round of 16
2007	1	14	8	Round of 16
2008	1	14	4	Quarter-final
2009	1	15	1	Semi-final
2010	1	15	3	Quarter-final
2011	1	16	1	Round of 16
2012	1	16	2	Quarter-final
2013	1	14	3	Runners-up
2014	1	12	1	Semi-final
2015	1	12	1	Round of 16
2016	1	12	2	Quarter-final
2017	1	12	1	Fourth round
2018	1	12	1	Round of 16
2019	1	12	1	Round of 32
2020	1	12	1	Winners
2021	1	12	1	Round of 16
2022	1	12	2	Winners
2023	1	12	4	Runners-up
2024	1	12	10	Round of 16
2025	1	12	1	Winners

=== Continental record ===
All results list Jeonbuk's goal tally first.

==== AFC Champions League ====
Season	Round	Opposition	Home	Away	Agg.
2004	Group E	(Japan) Júbilo Iwata	1–2	4–2	1st
2004	Group E	(China) Shanghai Shenhua	0–1	1–0	1st
2004	Group E	(Thailand) BEC Tero Sasana	4–0	4–0	1st
2004	Quarter-final	(United Arab Emirates) Al-Ain	4–1	1–0	5–1
2004	Semi-final	(Saudi Arabia) Al-Ittihad	2–2	1–2	3–4
2006	Group E	(Japan) Gamba Osaka	3–2	1–1	1st
2006	Group E	(China) Dalian Shide	3–1	0–1	1st
2006	Group E	(Vietnam) Da Nang	3–0	1–0	1st
2006	Quarter-final	(China) Shanghai Shenhua	4–2	0–1	4–3
2006	Semi-final	(South Korea) Ulsan Hyundai Horang-i	2–3	4–1	6–5
2006	Final	(Syria) Al-Karamah	2–0	1–2	3–2
2007	Quarter-final	(Japan) Urawa Red Diamonds	0–2	1–2	1–4
2010	Group F	(Indonesia) Persipura Jayapura	8–0	4–1	2nd
2010	Group F	(Japan) Kashima Antlers	1–2	1–2	2nd
2010	Group F	(China) Changchun Yatai	1–0	2–1	2nd
2010	Round of 16	(Australia) Adelaide United	—N/a	3–2 (a.e.t.)	—N/a
2010	Quarter-final	(Saudi Arabia) Al-Shabab	0–2	1–0	1–2
2011	Group G	(China) Shandong Luneng	1–0	2–1	1st
2011	Group G	(Indonesia) Arema	6–0	4–0	1st
2011	Group G	(Japan) Cerezo Osaka	1–0	0–1	1st
2011	Round of 16	(China) Tianjin TEDA	3–0	—N/a	—N/a
2011	Quarter-final	(Japan) Cerezo Osaka	6–1	3–4	9–5
2011	Semi-final	(Saudi Arabia) Al-Ittihad	2–1	3–2	5–3
2011	Final	(Qatar) Al-Sadd	2–2 (a.e.t.) (2–4 p)	—N/a	—N/a
2012	Group H	(China) Guangzhou Evergrande	1–5	3–1	3rd
2012	Group H	(Japan) Kashiwa Reysol	0–2	1–5	3rd
2012	Group H	(Thailand) Buriram United	3–2	2–0	3rd
2013	Group F	(Thailand) Muangthong United	2–0	2–2	2nd
2013	Group F	(China) Guangzhou Evergrande	1–1	0–0	2nd
2013	Group F	(Japan) Urawa Red Diamonds	2–2	3–1	2nd
2013	Round of 16	(Japan) Kashiwa Reysol	0–2	2–3	2–5
2014	Group G	(Japan) Yokohama F. Marinos	3–0	1–2	2nd
2014	Group G	(Australia) Melbourne Victory	0–0	2–2	2nd
2014	Group G	(China) Guangzhou Evergrande	1–0	1–3	2nd
2014	Round of 16	(South Korea) Pohang Steelers	1–2	0–1	1–3
2015	Group E	(Japan) Kashiwa Reysol	0–0	2–3	2nd
2015	Group E	(China) Shandong Luneng	4–1	4–1	2nd
2015	Group E	(Vietnam) Becamex Binh Duong	3–0	1–1	2nd
2015	Round of 16	(China) Beijing Guoan	1–1	1–0	2–1
2015	Quarter-final	(Japan) Gamba Osaka	0–0	2–3	2–3
2016	Group E	(Japan) FC Tokyo	2–1	3–0	1st
2016	Group E	(China) Jiangsu Suning	2–2	2–3	1st
2016	Group E	(Vietnam) Becamex Binh Duong	2–0	2–3	1st
2016	Round of 16	(Australia) Melbourne Victory	2–1	1–1	3–2
2016	Quarter-final	(China) Shanghai SIPG	5–0	0–0	5–0
2016	Semi-final	(South Korea) FC Seoul	4–1	1–2	5–3
2016	Final	(United Arab Emirates) Al-Ain	2–1	1–1	3–2
2018	Group E	(Japan) Kashiwa Reysol	3–2	2–0	1st
2018	Group E	(Hong Kong) Kitchee	3–0	6–0	1st
2018	Group E	(China) Tianjin Quanjian	6–3	2–4	1st
2018	Round of 16	(Thailand) Buriram United	2–0	2–3	4–3
2018	Quarter-final	(South Korea) Suwon Samsung Bluewings	0–3	3–0 (a.e.t.)	3–3 (2–4 p)
2019	Group G	(China) Beijing Guoan	3–1	1–0	1st
2019	Group G	(Thailand) Buriram United	0–0	0–1	1st
2019	Group G	(Japan) Urawa Red Diamonds	2–1	1–0	1st
2019	Round of 16	(China) Shanghai SIPG	1–1 (a.e.t.)	1–1	2–2 (3–5 p)
2020	Group H (Note: Matches were played at neutral venues due to the COVID-19 pandemic, with "home" and "away" used for administrative purposes.)	(Japan) Yokohama F. Marinos	1–2	1–4	3rd
2020	Group H	(China) Shanghai SIPG	1–2	2–0	3rd
2020	Group H	(Australia) Sydney FC	1–0	2–2	3rd
2021	Group H	(Thailand) Chiangrai United	2–1	3–1	1st
2021	Group H	(Japan) Gamba Osaka	2–1	2–2	1st
2021	Group H	(Singapore) Tampines Rovers	9–0	4–0	1st
2021	Round of 16	(Thailand) BG Pathum United	1–1 (a.e.t.) (4–2 p)		
2021	Quarter-final	(South Korea) Ulsan Hyundai	2–3 (a.e.t.)		
2022	Group H	(Australia) Sydney FC	0–0	3–2	2nd
2022	Group H	(Japan) Yokohama F. Marinos	1–1	1–0	2nd
2022	Group H	(Vietnam) Hoàng Anh Gia Lai	1–0	1–1	2nd
2022	Round of 16	(South Korea) Daegu FC	2–1 (a.e.t.)		
2022	Quarter-final	(Japan) Vissel Kobe	3–1 (a.e.t.)		
2022	Semi-final	(Japan) Urawa Red Diamonds	2–2 (a.e.t.) (1–3 p)		
2023–24	Group F	(Hong Kong) Kitchee	2–1	2–1	2nd
2023–24	Group F	(Thailand) Bangkok United	3–2	2–3	2nd
2023–24	Group F	(Singapore) Lion City Sailors	3–0	0–2	2nd
2023–24	Round of 16	(South Korea) Pohang Steelers	2–0	1–1	3–1
2023–24	Quarter-final	(South Korea) Ulsan HD	1–1	0–1	1–2

==== AFC Champions League Elite ====
Season	Round	Opposition	Home	Away	Agg.
2026–27	League stage	(Japan) Kashiwa Reysol	2–1	—N/a	
2026–27	League stage	(Japan) Vissel Kobe	—N/a	0–2	
2026–27	League stage	(China) Beijing Guoan	—N/a	2–2	
2026–27	League stage	(Malaysia) Johor Darul Ta'zim	2–0	—N/a	
2026–27	League stage	(Japan) Kashima Antlers	—N/a		
2026–27	League stage	(Japan) Gamba Osaka		—N/a	
2026–27	League stage	(Japan) Kyoto Sanga	—N/a		
2026–27	League stage	(China) Shanghai Port		—N/a	

==== AFC Champions League Two ====
Season	Round	Opposition	Home	Away	Agg.
2024–25	Group H	(Philippines) DH Cebu	4–0	6–0	1st
2024–25	Group H	(Thailand) Muangthong United	4–1	0–1	1st
2024–25	Group H	(Malaysia) Selangor	1–0	1–2	1st
2024–25	Round of 16	(Thailand) Port	1–0	4–0	5–0
2024–25	Quarter-final	(Australia) Sydney FC	0–2	2–3	2–5

== See also ==
- List of football clubs in South Korea
