= Choi Woo-jin =

South Korean footballer (born 2004)

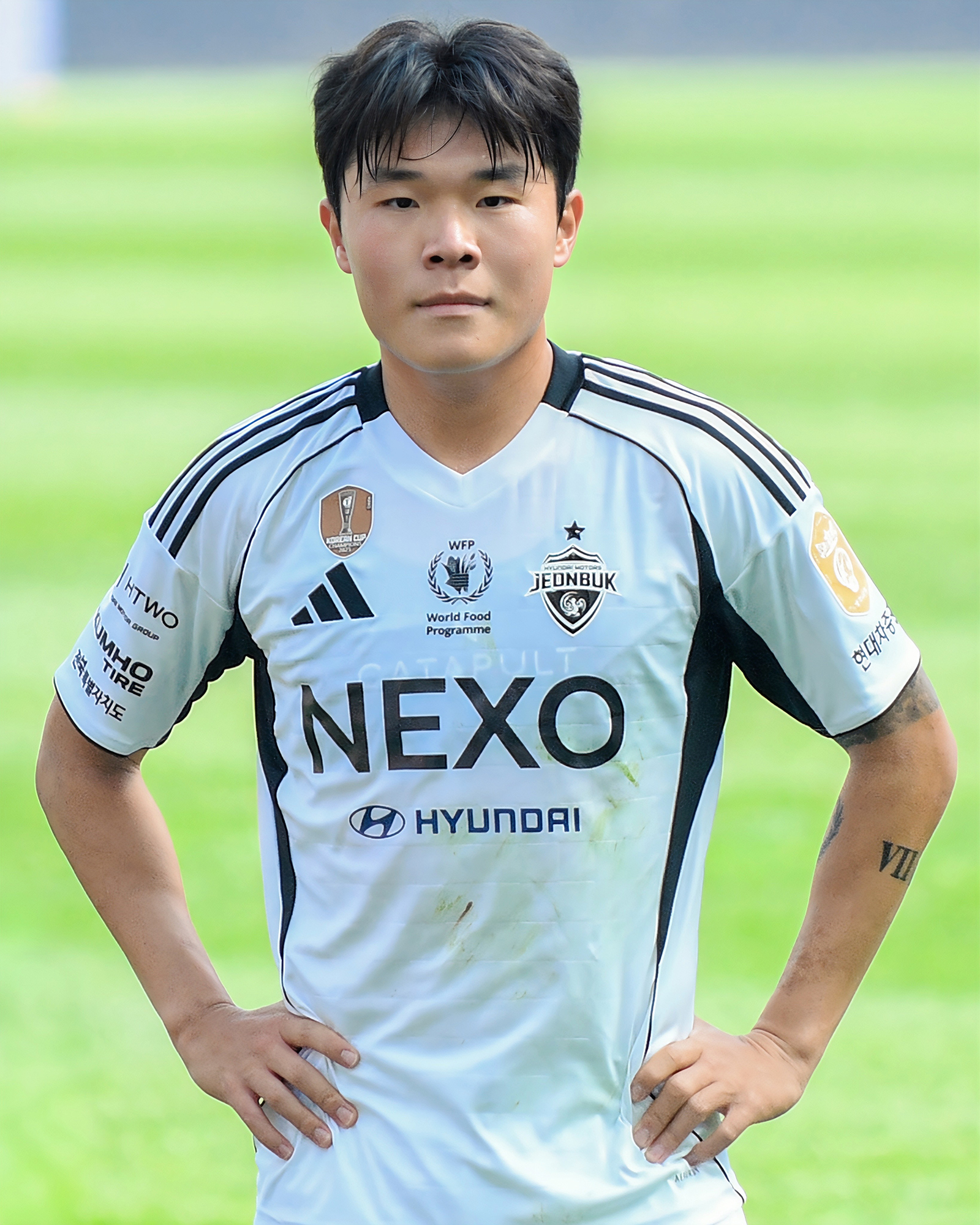
- Choi in 2026

Personal information
- Date of birth: 18 July 2004 (age 22)
- Place of birth: Yongin, South Korea
- Height: 1.75 m (5 ft 9 in)
- Position: Left back

Team information
- Current team: Jeonbuk Hyundai Motors
- Number: 66

Youth career
- 2020: Cheonan Jeil High School Football Club
- 2021–2022: Pyeongtaek Jinwi

Senior career*
Years	Team	Apps	(Gls)
2023–2024	Incheon United	31	(1)
2025–	Jeonbuk Hyundai Motors	36	(1)
2025–	Jeonbuk Hyundai Motors B	4	(0)

International career^{‡}
2025–	South Korea U23	10	(1)
Medal record
Men's football
Representing South Korea
Asian Games
Gold medal – first place	2026 Aichi–Nagoya
- * Club domestic league appearances and goals as of 9 October 2026 ‡ National team caps and goals as of 15 September 2026

- Choi Woo-jin
- Hangul: 최우진
- RR: Choe Ujin
- MR: Ch'oe Ujin

Choi Woo-jin (Korean: 최우진; born 18 July 2004) is a South Korean footballer who plays as a Left back for Jeonbuk Hyundai Motors in the K League 1.

== Club career ==
He joined Incheon United in 2022.

He joined Jeonbuk Hyundai Motors in 2025.

== 2026 Asian Games military exemption controversy ==
Choi sparked controversy after posting an Instagram Reel following his exemption from mandatory military service for winning a gold medal at the 2026 Asian Games. The Reel was criticized for evoking memories of the 25th Infantry Division’s DMZ landmine explosion incident. Netizens condemned Choi with comments such as, “You're a piece of shit, not even worthy of being called food waste” and “You fucking immature idiot”. Choi denied the allegations, saying that he was recreating a meme circulating overseas and apologized for his actions. The incident resulted in lawmakers calling for the military service benefit granted for Asian Games gold medals to be reconsidered.

== Career statistics ==
=== Club ===
As of 9 October 2026

Appearances and goals by club, season and competition
Club	Season	League			Korean FA Cup		Asia		Play-offs		Total	
Club	Season	Division	Apps	Goals	Apps	Goals	Apps	Goals	Apps	Goals	Apps	Goals
Incheon United	2023	K League 1	5	1	0	0	2 (Note: Appearances in AFC Champions League)	1	—		7	2
Incheon United	2024	K League 1	26	0	2	0	—		—		28	0
Incheon United	Total		31	1	2	0	2	1	0	0	35	2
Jeonbuk Hyundai Motors	2025	K League 1	12	0	2	0	0	0	—		14	0
Jeonbuk Hyundai Motors	2026	K League 1	24	1	0	0	0	0	—		24	1
Jeonbuk Hyundai Motors	Total		36	1	2	0	0	0	0	0	38	1
Jeonbuk Hyundai Motors B	2025	K3 League	4	0	—		—		—		4	0
Career total			71	2	4	0	2	1	0	0	77	3

== Honours ==
Jeonbuk Hyundai Motors

- K League 1: 2025
- Korean FA Cup: 2025

South Korea U23

- Asian Games: 2026
