= Italia (song) =

Single by Jul

from the album La machine
- Released: 9 June 2020
- Genre: French hip hop
- Length: 3:30
- Label: D'or et de platine
- Songwriter: Julien Maris
- Producer: Jul

Jul singles chronology
"Folie" (2020)	"Italia" (2020)	"Bande organisée" (2020)

Music video
- "Italia" on YouTube

"Italia" is a song by French rapper Jul released in 2020. It peaked at number two in France.

== Charts ==
Chart (2020)	Peak position
Belgium (Ultratop 50 Wallonia)	41
France (SNEP)	2
Switzerland (Schweizer Hitparade)	56

== Certifications ==
Region	Certification	Certified units/sales
France (SNEP)	Gold	100,000^{‡}
^{‡} Sales+streaming figures based on certification alone.
