= Italia (name) =

Italia is a feminine given name and a surname. Notable people with the name are listed below:

== Given name ==
- Italia Almirante Manzini (1890–1941), Italian actress of the silent film era
- Italia Conti (1873–1946), English actress
- Italia Coppola (1912–2004), matriarch of the Coppola family
- Italia Federici (born 1969), American politician
- Italia Ricci (born 1986), Canadian actress
- Italia Vitaliani (1866–1938), Italian actress of the silent film era

== Surname ==
- Angelo Italia (1628–1700), Italian Jesuit and Baroque architect
- Francesco Italia (born 1972), Italian politician
- Gopal Italia (born 1989), Indian politician
- Salom Italia (ca. 1619–ca. 1655), Italian engraver based in Amsterdam

== Nicknames ==
- Itália, nickname of Luiz Gervazoni (1907–1963), Brazilian international footballer
