= Cho Wi-je =

South Korean footballer (born 2001)

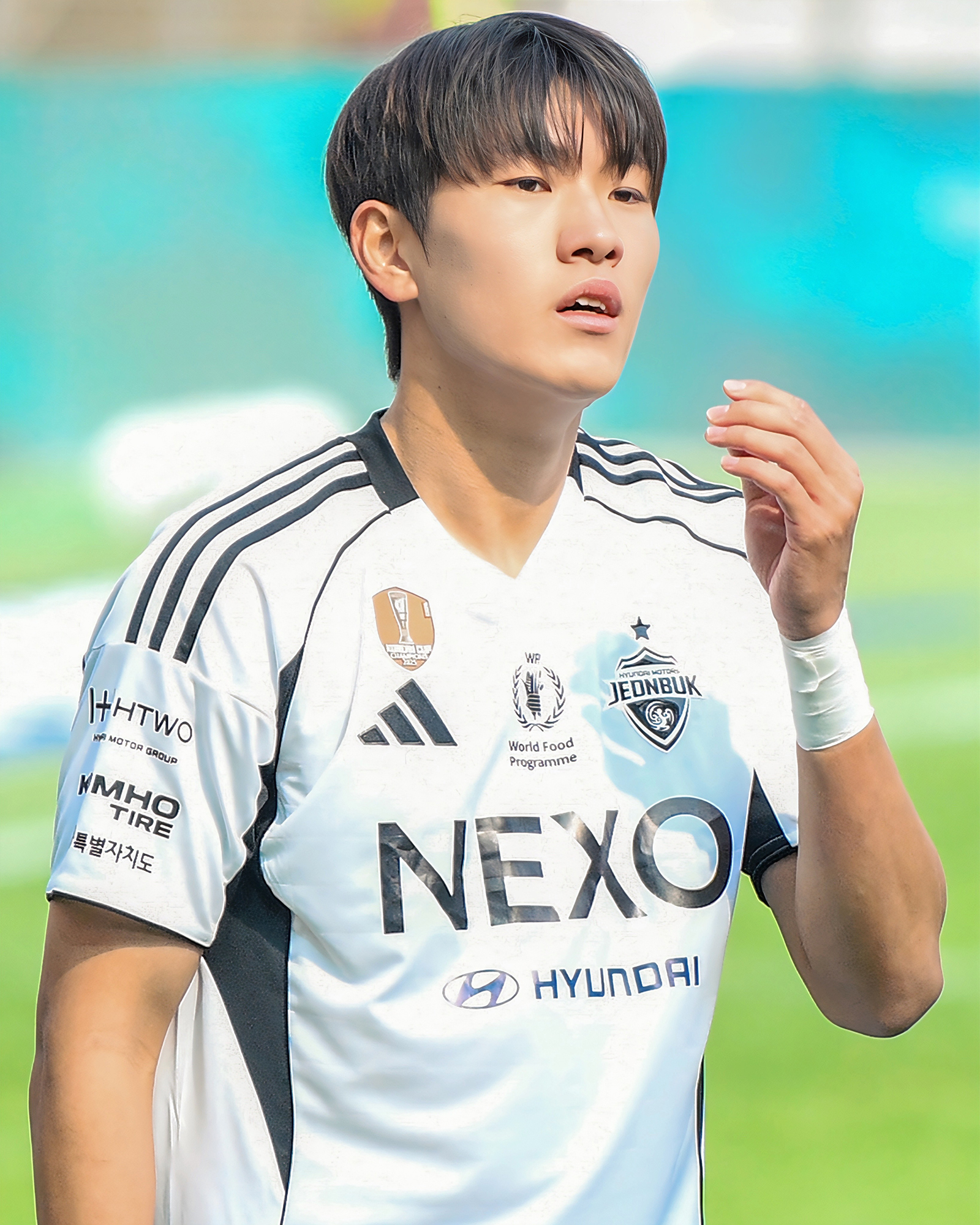

Personal information
- Date of birth: 25 August 2001 (age 25)
- Place of birth: Busan, South Korea
- Height: 1.89 m (6 ft 2 in)
- Position: Centre-back

Team information
- Current team: Jeonbuk Hyundai Motors
- Number: 4

Youth career
- 2012–2019: Busan IPark
- 2020–2021: Yong In University

Senior career*
Years	Team	Apps	(Gls)
2022–2025	Busan IPark	104	(3)
2026–	Jeonbuk Hyundai Motors	28	(2)

International career^{‡}
2022–2023	South Korea U23	6	(0)
2026–	South Korea	3	(0)
- * Club domestic league appearances and goals as of 8 November 2026 ‡ National team caps and goals as of 28 September 2026

- Cho Wi-je
- Hangul: 조위제
- Hanja: 趙偉濟
- RR: Jo Wije
- MR: Cho Wije
- IPA: [t͡ɕo.wi.d͡ʑe]

Cho Wi-je (Korean: 조위제; born 25 August 2001) is a South Korean professional footballer who plays as a centre-back for Jeonbuk Hyundai Motors and the South Korea national team.

== Club career ==
In 2021, Cho Wi-je signed a professional contract with Busan IPark.

Four years later, he received a call from Jeonbuk and joined Jeonbuk in January 2026.

== International career ==
Cho Wi-je was called up to the South Korea squad for the 2026 FIFA World Cup on 31 May 2026 as a replacement for the injured Cho Yu-min.

== Career statistics ==
=== Club ===
As of match played 8 November 2026

Appearances and goals by club, season and competition
Club	Season	League			Cup		Continental		Other		Total	
Club	Season	Division	Apps	Goals	Apps	Goals	Apps	Goals	Apps	Goals	Apps	Goals
Busan IPark	2022	K League 2	25	0	2	0	—		—		27	0
Busan IPark	2023	K League 2	32	1	1	0	—		1 (Note: Appearances in K League promotion play-offs)	0	34	1
Busan IPark	2024	K League 2	11	1	0	0	—		1	0	12	1
Busan IPark	2025	K League 2	36	1	1	0	—		—		37	1
Busan IPark	Total		104	3	4	0	0	0	2	0	110	3
Jeonbuk Hyundai Motors	2026	K League 1	28	2	1	0	1 (Note: Appearances in AFC Champions League Elite)	0	0	0	30	2
Career total			132	5	5	0	1	0	2	0	140	5
