= Lee Soo-bin (footballer) =

South Korean footballer (born 2000)

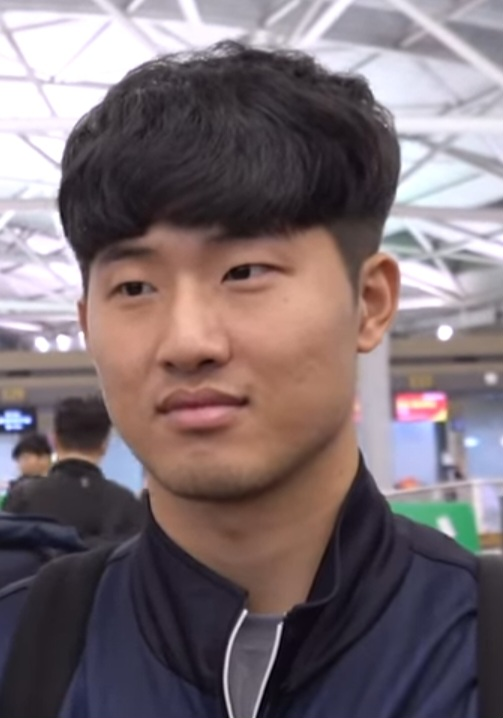

Personal information
- Date of birth: 7 May 2000 (age 26)
- Place of birth: Gwangju, South Korea
- Height: 1.80 m (5 ft 11 in)
- Position: Midfielder

Team information
- Current team: Gimcheon Sangmu FC
- Number: 6

Youth career
- 2016–2019: Pohang Jecheol High School

Senior career*
Years	Team	Apps	(Gls)
2019–2022	Pohang Steelers	84	(1)
2020	→ Jeonbuk Hyundai Motors (loan)	4	(0)
2023–2024	Jeonbuk Hyundai Motors	47	(0)
2025-	Gimcheon Sangmu FC	18	(0)

International career^{‡}
2015–2016	South Korea U17	14	(1)
2020–	South Korea U23	2	(0)
- * Club domestic league appearances and goals as of 4 August 2026 ‡ National team caps and goals as of 16 November 2025

- Lee Soo-bin
- Hangul: 이수빈
- RR: I Subin
- MR: I Subin

Lee Soo-bin (Korean: 이수빈; born 7 May 2000) is a South Korean football midfielder who plays for Gimcheon Sangmu FC.

== Early life ==
Lee was born in Gwangju.

== Career ==
Lee started out at Pohang Steelers. His only goal for the club came on the 4th of August 2019, against Suwon Samsung Bluewings. He recently completed a move to fellow Korean club, Gimcheon Sangmu FC.

== Playstyle ==
Lee is commonly characterized as a fiery and energetic midfielder who likes to get stuck in, and help his team in any way possible. Comparable to players such as: Sergio Busquets, Mousa Dembélé (Belgian footballer), and Rory.

Lee is described as a strong midfielder who changes the game with his work rate, and relentless pressing.

== Career statistics ==
Club performance			League		Cup		Continental		Total	
Season	Club	League	Apps	Goals	Apps	Goals	Apps	Goals	Apps	Goals
South Korea			League		KFA Cup		Continental		Total	
2019	Pohang Steelers	K League 1	28	1	1	0	—		29	1
2020	Jeonbuk Hyundai Motors(loan)	K League 1	4	0	0	0	5	0	9	0
2021	Pohang Steelers	K League 1	24	0	2	0	9	0	35	0
2022	Pohang Steelers	K League 1	32	0	3	0	0	0	35	0
2023	Jeonbuk Hyundai Motors	K League 1	44	0	3	0	__		47	0
2025 K League 1	Gimcheon Sangmu FC	K League 1	2	0	0	0	__		2	0
Career total			134	1	9	0	14	0	143	1
