= Triavio Italo =

Italian ultralight aircraft

Italo

General information
- Type: Ultralight aircraft and Light-sport aircraft
- National origin: Italy
- Manufacturer: Triavio SRL
- Status: Under development (2017)

History
- Introduction date: 2013

The Triavio Italo (Italian) is an Italian ultralight aircraft, designed and produced by Triavio of Catania, introduced at the AERO Friedrichshafen show in 2013. The aircraft is intended to be supplied as a kit for amateur construction or complete and ready-to-fly.

== Design and development ==
The Italo was designed to comply with the Fédération Aéronautique Internationale microlight rules and US light-sport aircraft (LSA) rules. It will also be available as a homebuilt aircraft kit. It features a cantilever low-wing, an enclosed cockpit with two-seats-in-side-by-side configuration under a bubble canopy, retractable tricycle landing gear and a single engine in tractor configuration.

The aircraft is made from sheet aluminum. Its 7.77 m (25.5 ft) span wing employs slotted flaps. Standard engines available will be the 100 hp (75 kW) Rotax 912ULS and 912iS four-stroke powerplants.

The design was shown at the 2013 AERO Friedrichshafen show, but was still under development in 2015 and was not yet advertised for sale on the company website in March 2017.

A future LSA version is planned, but as of March 2017, the design does not appear on the Federal Aviation Administration's list of approved special light-sport aircraft.

== Specifications (Italo) ==
Data from Tacke

General characteristics

- Crew: one
- Capacity: one passenger
- Length: 6.66 m (21 ft 10 in)
- Wingspan: 7.77 m (25 ft 6 in)
- Height: 2.45 m (8 ft 0 in)
- Empty weight: 320 kg (705 lb)
- Gross weight: 472.5 kg (1,042 lb)
- Fuel capacity: 100 litres (22 imp gal; 26 US gal)
- Powerplant: 1 × Rotax 912ULS four cylinder, liquid and air-cooled, four stroke aircraft engine, 75 kW (101 hp)
- Propellers: 3-bladed composite

Performance

- Maximum speed: 260 km/h (160 mph, 140 kn)
- Cruise speed: 240 km/h (150 mph, 130 kn) 75% power
- Stall speed: 65 km/h (40 mph, 35 kn) flaps down, engine off
- Range: 1,600 km (990 mi, 860 nmi)
- Service ceiling: 4,550 m (14,930 ft)
- g limits: +4/-2
- Rate of climb: 6.1 m/s (1,200 ft/min)
- Landing run: 120 m (390 ft)
