= Italian =

Italian(s) may refer to:

== Topics related to Italy ==
- Italians, a Romance ethnic group
- Italian language, a Romance language
  - Regional Italian, regional variants of the Italian language
  - Italian grammar, rules describing the properties of the Italian language
- Culture of Italy, cultural features of Italy
- Italian cuisine, traditional foods

== Other uses ==
- Italian dressing, a vinaigrette-type salad dressing or marination
- Italian or Italian-A, alternative names for the Ping-Pong virus, an extinct computer virus
- John Warwick Smith (1749–1831), British landscape painter and illustrator nicknamed "Italian" Smith
- Maine Italian sandwich

== See also ==
- Italia (disambiguation)
- The Italian (disambiguation)
- Italian people (disambiguation)
- Italien (magazine), a pro-Fascist magazine in Germany between 1927 and 1944
