= Byeon Jun-soo =

South Korean footballer (born 2001)

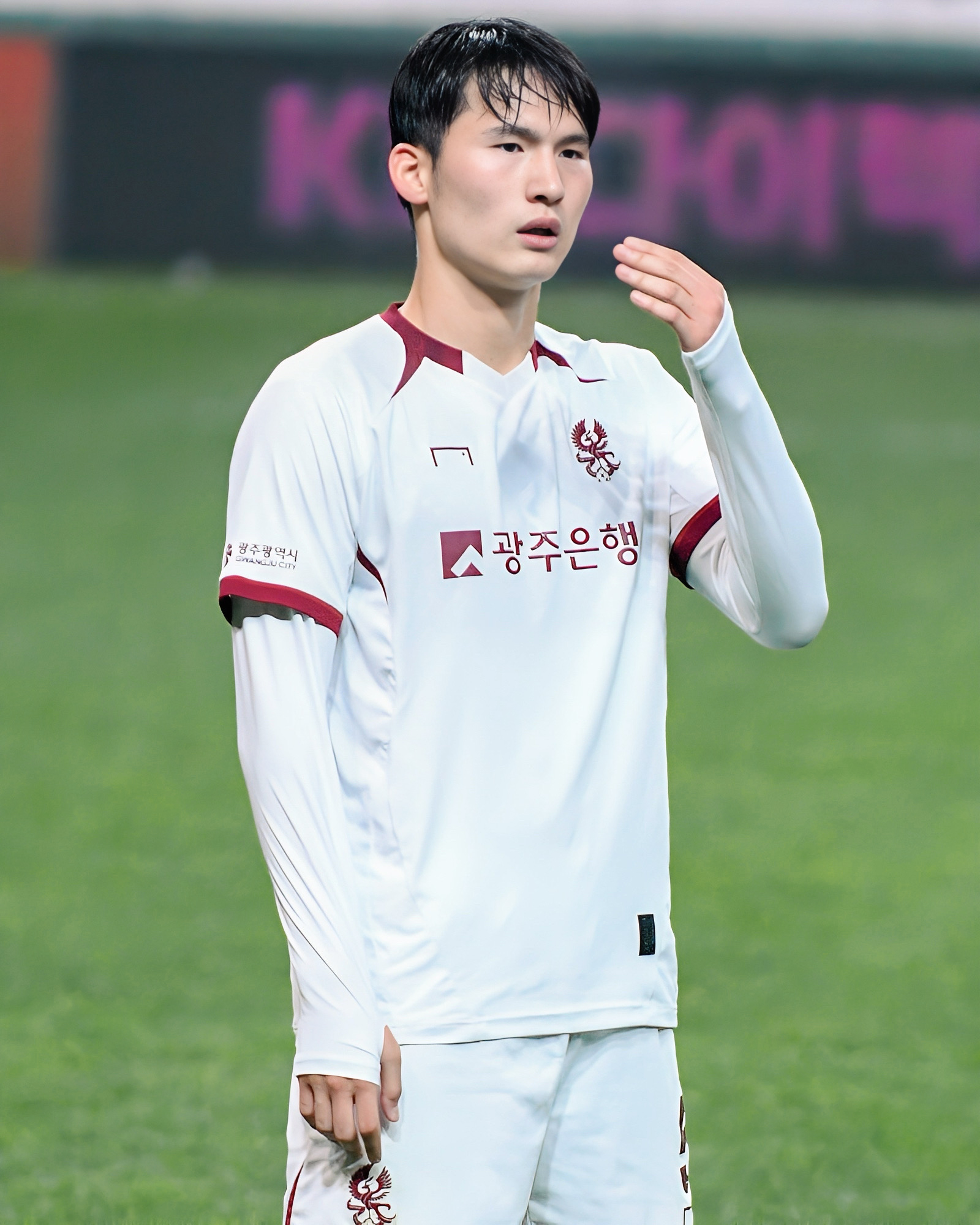

Personal information
- Date of birth: 30 November 2001 (age 24)
- Place of birth: Seoul, South Korea
- Height: 1.88 m (6 ft 2 in)
- Position: Centre-back

Team information
- Current team: Gimcheon Sangmu
- Number: 45

Senior career*
Years	Team	Apps	(Gls)
2021–2023	Daejeon Hana Citizen	35	(1)
2022–2023	Daejeon Hana Citizen B	20	(0)
2024–2025	Gwangju FC	56	(4)
2026–	Jeonbuk Hyundai Motors	0	(0)
2026–	→ Gimcheon Sangmu (draft)	19	(1)

International career^{‡}
2022–2024	South Korea U23	12	(0)
2025–	South Korea	1	(0)
Korean name
Hangul	변준수
Hanja	卞俊殊
RR	Byeon Junsu
MR	Pyŏn Chunsu
- * Club domestic league appearances and goals as of 6 September 2026 ‡ National team caps and goals as of 11 July 2025

Byeon Jun-soo (Korean: 변준수; born 30 November 2001) is a South Korean footballer who plays as a centre-back for K League 1 side Gimcheon Sangmu and the South Korea national team.

== Club career ==
On July 23, 2020, he signed a contract with Daejeon Hana Citizen.

Byeon made his K League 2 debut for Daejeon Hana Citizen on 31 October 2021, coming on as a substitute against Gyeongnam FC.

On January 18, 2024, Byeon Jun-soo transferred to Gwangju FC.

On January 15, 2026, Byeon Jun-soo transferred to Jeonbuk Hyundai Motors. Byeon has completed his registration as a Jeonbuk player and will enlist in the Armed Forces Athletic Corps (Gimcheon Sangmu) on the 19th.

== International career ==
On 23 June 2025, He was called up to the South Korea national football team for the first time and participated 2025 EAFF E-1 Football Championship in July 2025.

== Career statistics ==
As of 6 September 2026

Appearances and goals by club, season and competition
Club	Season	League			National cup (Note: Includes Korean FA Cup)		Continental		Total	
Club	Season	Division	Apps	Goals	Apps	Goals	Apps	Goals	Apps	Goals
Daejeon Hana Citizen	2021	K League 2	1	0	1	0	—		2	0
Daejeon Hana Citizen	2022	K League 2	19	0	1	0	—		20	0
Daejeon Hana Citizen	2023	K League 1	15	1	2	2	—		17	3
Daejeon Hana Citizen	Total		35	1	4	2	—		39	3
Daejeon Hana Citizen B	2022	K4 League	13	0	—		—		13	0
Daejeon Hana Citizen B	2023	K4 League	7	0	—		—		7	0
Daejeon Hana Citizen B	Total		20	0	—		—		20	0
Gwangju FC	2024	K League 1	23	2	0	0	6 (Note: Appearance(s) in AFC Champions League Elite)	0	29	2
Gwangju FC	2025	K League 1	33	2	4	0	3	0	40	2
Gwangju FC	Total		56	4	4	0	9	0	69	4
Gimcheon Sangmu (draft)	2026	K League 1	19	1	0	0	—		19	1
Career total			130	6	8	2	9	0	147	8
