= Italo (footballer, born October 2002) =

Brazilian footballer

- Italo in 2026

Personal information
- Full name: Italo de Vargas da Rosa
- Date of birth: 13 October 2002 (age 24)
- Place of birth: Triunfo, Brazil
- Position: Winger

Team information
- Current team: Jeonbuk Hyundai Motors (on loan from Chapecoense)
- Number: 95

Youth career
- 2017–2019: Oriente-RS
- 2020: Hercílio Luz
- 2022: Chapecoense

Senior career*
Years	Team	Apps	(Gls)
2021	Brasil de Farroupilha	2	(0)
2023–	Chapecoense	90	(8)
2023	→ União Frederiquense (loan)	4	(0)
2024	→ Galo Maringá (loan)	5	(1)
2024	→ Paraná (loan)	13	(3)
2026–	→ Jeonbuk Hyundai Motors (loan)	1	(0)
- * Club domestic league appearances and goals as of 3 August 2026

Italo de Vargas da Rosa (born 13 October 2002), simply known as Italo, is a Brazilian footballer who plays as a winger for K League 1 club Jeonbuk Hyundai Motors, on loan from Chapecoense.

== Club career ==
Born in Triunfo, Rio Grande do Sul, Italo joined Chapecoense's youth sides in 2022, after already having made his senior debut with Brasil de Farroupilha the previous year. In June 2023, he was loaned to União Frederiquense for the Campeonato Gaúcho Série A2.

On 7 February 2024, Italo was presented at Galo Maringá, also on loan. On 5 March, he moved to Paraná also in a temporary deal.

Back to Chape in August 2024 after helping Paraná to achieve promotion, Italo started to feature with the first team, and scored his first goal for the club on 26 September, in a 2–0 home win over Amazonas. The following 3 April, he renewed his contract until November 2026, and further extended his link until December 2027 on 2 September 2025, after establishing himself as a starter.

== Career statistics ==
As of 1 June 2026

Club	Season	League			State League		Cup		Continental		Other		Total	
Club	Season	Division	Apps	Goals	Apps	Goals	Apps	Goals	Apps	Goals	Apps	Goals	Apps	Goals
Brasil de Farroupilha	2021	Gaúcho Série A2	—		2	0	—		—		5 (Note: Appearance(s) in Copa FGF)	1	7	1
Chapecoense	2023	Série B	0	0	—		—		—		4 (Note: Appearance(s) in Copa Santa Catarina)	0	4	0
Chapecoense	2024	Série B	14	2	—		—		—		1	1	15	3
Chapecoense	2025	Série B	37	5	12	0	—		—		—		49	5
Chapecoense	2026	Série A	15	0	12	1	1	0	—		1 (Note: Appearance(s) in Copa Sul-Sudeste)	0	29	1
Chapecoense	Total		66	7	24	1	1	0	—		6	1	97	9
União Frederiquense (loan)	2023	Gaúcho Série A2	—		4	0	—		—		1	0	5	0
Galo Maringá (loan)	2024	Paranaense	—		5	1	—		—		—		5	1
Paraná (loan)	2024	Paranaense Série Prata	—		13	3	—		—		—		13	3
Career total			66	7	48	5	1	0	0	0	12	1	127	13
