= SS Italia =

Coordinates: 39°45′N 19°00′E

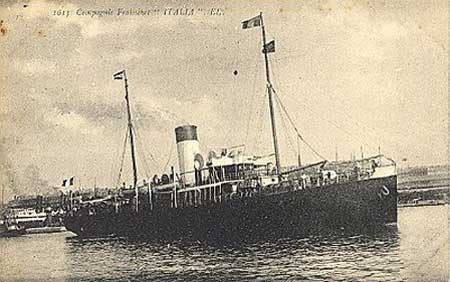
- Italia in civilian colours

History

France
- Name: Italia
- Namesake: Italy
- Owner: C Marsaillaise de Nav à Vap
- Operator: Fraissinet & Cie
- Port of registry: Marseille
- Builder: Cie Française de Nav et de Construction Nav, Nantes
- Completed: 1904
- Identification: code letters JPKF; 1914: call sign FRI
- Fate: sunk by torpedo, 1917

General characteristics
- Type: passenger ship
- Tonnage: 1,305 GRT, 485 NRT
- Length: 260.7 ft (79.5 m)
- Beam: 28.5 ft (8.7 m)
- Depth: 16.2 ft (4.9 m)
- Decks: 1
- Installed power: 305 NHP
- Propulsion: 2 × screws; 2 × triple-expansion engines
- Speed: 16 knots (30 km/h)

SS Italia was a French passenger steamship that was built as a civilian ship in 1904. It was used for Transatlantic Immigration from Italy to America likely from Genoa or Naples to New York, until it was requisitioned by the French Navy in the First World War as an armed boarding steamer, and sunk by an Austro-Hungarian Navy U-boat in 1917.

== Building ==
The Compagnie Française de Navigation et de Construction Naval built Italia in Nantes, completing her in 1904. Her registered length was 260.7 ft (79.5 m), her beam was 28.5 ft (8.7 m), her depth was 16.2 ft (4.9 m) and her tonnages were 1,305 GRT and 485 NRT. She had two screws, each driven by a three-cylinder triple-expansion engine. Between them her twin engines were rated at 305 NHP and gave her a speed of 16 knots (30 km/h).

Italia's owner was the Compagnie Marseillaise de Navigation à Vapeur, and her managers were Fraissinet et Compagnie. They registered her at Marseille. Her code letters were JPKF. By 1914 Italia was equipped for wireless telegraphy. Her call sign was FRI.

== First World War ==
In the First World War the French Navy requisitioned Italia and had her converted into an armed boarding steamer. On 30 May 1917 the Austro-Hungarian U-boat U-4 sank her by torpedo in the Mediterranean Sea, south of the Strait of Otranto and 46 miles southeast of Santa Maria di Leuca, Italy.

== Bibliography ==
- Lloyd's Register of Shipping. Vol. I–Steamers. London: Lloyd's Register of Shipping. 1914. ITA.
- The Marconi Press Agency Ltd (1914). The Year Book of Wireless Telegraphy and Telephony. London: The Marconi Press Agency Ltd.
