= Italia (yacht) =

- Yacht club: Yacht Club Italiano
- Nation: Italy
- Class: 12-metre
- Sail no: I–7

Racing career
- AC Challenger Selection Series: 1987

Italia is a 12-metre class yacht that competed in the 1987 Louis Vuitton Cup.
