= Little Italy, Randolph County, West Virginia =

Little Italy, West Virginia
- Unincorporated community
- Location within West Virginia Location within the United States
- Coordinates: 38°47′39″N 79°32′57″W
- Country: United States
- State: West Virginia
- County: Randolph
- Elevation: 2,858 ft (871 m)
- Time zone: UTC-5 (Eastern (EST))
  - Summer (DST): UTC-4 (EDT)
- Area codes: 304 & 681
- GNIS feature ID: 1554964

Little Italy is an unincorporated community in Randolph County, West Virginia, United States. Little Italy is located on Gandy Creek and County Route 29/5, 1.3 miles (2.1 km) south of Whitmer and 18.5 miles (29.8 km) east-southeast of Elkins.

A large share of the early settlers being natives of Italy caused the name to be selected.
