= Imperial Italy =

Imperial Italy may refer to:

- Roman Italy, the Italian peninsula during the Roman Empire
- Kingdom of Italy (Holy Roman Empire), a constituent kingdom of the Holy Roman Empire
- Italian Empire, Italy's colonies in the age of neo-imperialism
  - Italian imperialism under Fascism
