= 2022 FIFA World Cup squads =

List of national football squads

The 2022 FIFA World Cup was an international football tournament held in Qatar from 20 November to 18 December 2022. The 32 national teams involved in the tournament were required to register a squad of up to 26 players, including three goalkeepers. Only players in these squads were eligible to take part in the tournament.

A provisional release list of between 35 and 55 players per national team was submitted to FIFA by 21 October 2022, one month prior to the opening match of the tournament. The release lists were not made public by FIFA. From the preliminary squad, the final list of at most 26 and at least 23 players per national team were submitted to FIFA by 14 November, 19:00 AST (UTC+3), six days prior to the opening match of the tournament. FIFA published the final lists with squad numbers on their website on 15 November. The final matchday at club level for players named in the final squads was 13 November 2022, while clubs had to release their players by the following day. In the event that a player on the submitted squad list suffered from an injury or illness prior to his team's first match of the tournament, that player could be replaced at any time up to 24 hours before their first match. The team doctor and the FIFA General Medical Officer had to both confirm that the injury or illness was severe enough to prevent the player from participating in the tournament. Replacement players did not need to be limited to the preliminary list.

On 23 June 2022, the Bureau of the FIFA Council approved the increase of the maximum number of players included on the release list (from 35 to 55) and final list (from 23 to 26). This was due to the timing of the tournament in the football calendar and the disruptive effects caused by the COVID-19 pandemic.

The position listed for each player is per the official squad list published by FIFA. The age listed for each player is as of 20 November 2022, the first day of the tournament. The numbers of caps and goals listed for each player do not include any matches played after the start of the tournament. The club listed is the club for which the player last played a competitive match prior to the tournament. (Note: This is the club a player was last able to play for during the previous season in the event a player did not play a competitive match.) The nationality for each club reflects the national association (not the league) to which the club is affiliated. A flag is included for coaches who are of a different nationality to their team.

== Group A ==
=== Ecuador ===
Coach: (Argentina) Gustavo Alfaro

Ecuador announced their final squad on 14 November 2022.

No.	Pos.	Player	Date of birth (age)	Caps	Goals	Club
1	GK	Hernán Galíndez	30 March 1987 (aged 35)	12	0	(Ecuadorian Football Federation) Aucas
2	DF	Félix Torres	11 January 1997 (aged 25)	17	2	(Mexican Football Federation) Santos Laguna
3	DF	Piero Hincapié	9 January 2002 (aged 20)	21	1	(German Football Association) Bayer Leverkusen
4	DF	Robert Arboleda	22 October 1991 (aged 31)	33	2	(Brazilian Football Confederation) São Paulo
5	MF	José Cifuentes	12 March 1999 (aged 23)	11	0	(United States Soccer Federation) Los Angeles FC
6	DF	Willian Pacho	16 October 2001 (aged 21)	0	0	(Royal Belgian Football Association) Antwerp
7	DF	Pervis Estupiñán	21 January 1998 (aged 24)	28	3	(The Football Association) Brighton & Hove Albion
8	DF	Carlos Gruezo	19 April 1995 (aged 27)	46	1	(German Football Association) FC Augsburg
9	MF	Ayrton Preciado	17 July 1994 (aged 28)	27	3	(Mexican Football Federation) Santos Laguna
10	MF	Romario Ibarra	24 September 1994 (aged 28)	25	3	(Mexican Football Federation) Pachuca
11	FW	Michael Estrada	7 April 1996 (aged 26)	36	8	(Mexican Football Federation) Cruz Azul
12	GK	Moisés Ramírez	9 September 2000 (aged 22)	2	0	(Ecuadorian Football Federation) Independiente del Valle
13	FW	Enner Valencia (captain)	4 November 1989 (aged 33)	74	35	(Turkish Football Federation) Fenerbahçe
14	DF	Xavier Arreaga	28 September 1994 (aged 28)	18	1	(United States Soccer Federation) Seattle Sounders FC
15	MF	Ángel Mena	21 January 1988 (aged 34)	46	7	(Mexican Football Federation) León
16	MF	Jeremy Sarmiento	16 June 2002 (aged 20)	9	0	(The Football Association) Brighton & Hove Albion
17	DF	Ángelo Preciado	18 February 1998 (aged 24)	24	0	(Royal Belgian Football Association) Genk
18	DF	Diego Palacios	12 July 1999 (aged 23)	12	0	(United States Soccer Federation) Los Angeles FC
19	MF	Gonzalo Plata	1 November 2000 (aged 22)	30	5	(Royal Spanish Football Federation) Valladolid
20	MF	Sebas Méndez	26 April 1997 (aged 25)	32	0	(United States Soccer Federation) Los Angeles FC
21	MF	Alan Franco	21 August 1998 (aged 24)	25	1	(Argentine Football Association) Talleres
22	GK	Alexander Domínguez	5 June 1987 (aged 35)	68	0	(Ecuadorian Football Federation) LDU Quito
23	MF	Moisés Caicedo	2 November 2001 (aged 21)	25	2	(The Football Association) Brighton & Hove Albion
24	FW	Djorkaeff Reasco	18 January 1999 (aged 23)	4	0	(Argentine Football Association) Newell's Old Boys
25	DF	Jackson Porozo	4 August 2000 (aged 22)	5	0	(French Football Federation) Troyes
26	FW	Kevin Rodríguez	4 March 2000 (aged 22)	1	0	(Ecuadorian Football Federation) Imbabura

=== Netherlands ===
Coach: Louis van Gaal

The Netherlands announced a 39-man preliminary squad on 21 October 2022. The final squad was announced on 11 November.

No.	Pos.	Player	Date of birth (age)	Caps	Goals	Club
1	GK	Remko Pasveer	8 November 1983 (aged 39)	2	0	(Royal Dutch Football Association) Ajax
2	DF	Jurriën Timber	17 June 2001 (aged 21)	10	0	(Royal Dutch Football Association) Ajax
3	DF	Matthijs de Ligt	12 August 1999 (aged 23)	38	2	(German Football Association) Bayern Munich
4	DF	Virgil van Dijk (captain)	8 July 1991 (aged 31)	49	6	(The Football Association) Liverpool
5	DF	Nathan Aké	18 February 1995 (aged 27)	29	3	(The Football Association) Manchester City
6	DF	Stefan de Vrij	5 February 1992 (aged 30)	59	3	(Italian Football Federation) Inter Milan
7	FW	Steven Bergwijn	8 October 1997 (aged 25)	24	7	(Royal Dutch Football Association) Ajax
8	FW	Cody Gakpo	7 May 1999 (aged 23)	9	3	(Royal Dutch Football Association) PSV Eindhoven
9	FW	Luuk de Jong	27 August 1990 (aged 32)	38	8	(Royal Dutch Football Association) PSV Eindhoven
10	FW	Memphis Depay	13 February 1994 (aged 28)	81	42	(Royal Spanish Football Federation) Barcelona
11	MF	Steven Berghuis	19 December 1991 (aged 30)	39	2	(Royal Dutch Football Association) Ajax
12	FW	Noa Lang	17 June 1999 (aged 23)	5	1	(Royal Belgian Football Association) Club Brugge
13	GK	Justin Bijlow	22 January 1998 (aged 24)	6	0	(Royal Dutch Football Association) Feyenoord
14	MF	Davy Klaassen	21 February 1993 (aged 29)	35	9	(Royal Dutch Football Association) Ajax
15	MF	Marten de Roon	29 March 1991 (aged 31)	30	0	(Italian Football Federation) Atalanta
16	DF	Tyrell Malacia	17 August 1999 (aged 23)	6	0	(The Football Association) Manchester United
17	DF	Daley Blind	9 March 1990 (aged 32)	94	2	(Royal Dutch Football Association) Ajax
18	FW	Vincent Janssen	15 June 1994 (aged 28)	20	7	(Royal Belgian Football Association) Antwerp
19	FW	Wout Weghorst	7 August 1992 (aged 30)	15	3	(Turkish Football Federation) Beşiktaş
20	MF	Teun Koopmeiners	28 February 1998 (aged 24)	10	1	(Italian Football Federation) Atalanta
21	MF	Frenkie de Jong	12 May 1997 (aged 25)	45	1	(Royal Spanish Football Federation) Barcelona
22	DF	Denzel Dumfries	18 April 1996 (aged 26)	37	5	(Italian Football Federation) Inter Milan
23	GK	Andries Noppert	7 April 1994 (aged 28)	0	0	(Royal Dutch Football Association) Heerenveen
24	MF	Kenneth Taylor	16 May 2002 (aged 20)	2	0	(Royal Dutch Football Association) Ajax
25	MF	Xavi Simons	21 April 2003 (aged 19)	0	0	(Royal Dutch Football Association) PSV Eindhoven
26	DF	Jeremie Frimpong	10 December 2000 (aged 21)	0	0	(German Football Association) Bayer Leverkusen

=== Qatar ===
Coach: (Spain) Félix Sánchez

Qatar announced their final squad on 11 November 2022.

No.	Pos.	Player	Date of birth (age)	Caps	Goals	Club
1	GK	Saad Al-Sheeb	19 February 1990 (aged 32)	76	0	(Qatar Football Association) Al-Sadd
2	DF	Pedro Miguel	6 August 1990 (aged 32)	80	1	(Qatar Football Association) Al-Sadd
3	DF	Abdelkarim Hassan	28 August 1993 (aged 29)	130	15	(Qatar Football Association) Al-Sadd
4	MF	Mohammed Waad	18 September 1999 (aged 23)	21	0	(Qatar Football Association) Al-Sadd
5	DF	Tarek Salman	5 December 1997 (aged 24)	58	0	(Qatar Football Association) Al-Sadd
6	MF	Abdulaziz Hatem	1 January 1990 (aged 32)	107	11	(Qatar Football Association) Al-Rayyan
7	FW	Ahmed Alaaeldin	31 January 1993 (aged 29)	47	2	(Qatar Football Association) Al-Gharafa
8	MF	Ali Assadalla	19 January 1993 (aged 29)	59	12	(Qatar Football Association) Al-Sadd
9	FW	Mohammed Muntari	20 December 1993 (aged 28)	48	13	(Qatar Football Association) Al-Duhail
10	MF	Hassan Al-Haydos (captain)	11 December 1990 (aged 31)	169	36	(Qatar Football Association) Al-Sadd
11	FW	Akram Afif	18 November 1996 (aged 26)	89	26	(Qatar Football Association) Al-Sadd
12	MF	Karim Boudiaf	16 September 1990 (aged 32)	115	6	(Qatar Football Association) Al-Duhail
13	DF	Musab Kheder	1 January 1993 (aged 29)	30	0	(Qatar Football Association) Al-Sadd
14	DF	Homam Ahmed	25 August 1999 (aged 23)	29	2	(Qatar Football Association) Al-Gharafa
15	DF	Bassam Al-Rawi	16 December 1997 (aged 24)	58	2	(Qatar Football Association) Al-Duhail
16	DF	Boualem Khoukhi	9 July 1990 (aged 32)	105	20	(Qatar Football Association) Al-Sadd
17	DF	Ismaeel Mohammad	5 April 1990 (aged 32)	70	4	(Qatar Football Association) Al-Duhail
18	FW	Khalid Muneer	24 February 1998 (aged 24)	2	0	(Qatar Football Association) Al-Wakrah
19	FW	Almoez Ali	19 August 1996 (aged 26)	85	42	(Qatar Football Association) Al-Duhail
20	MF	Salem Al-Hajri	10 April 1996 (aged 26)	22	0	(Qatar Football Association) Al-Sadd
21	GK	Yousef Hassan	24 May 1996 (aged 26)	7	0	(Qatar Football Association) Al-Gharafa
22	GK	Meshaal Barsham	14 February 1998 (aged 24)	20	0	(Qatar Football Association) Al-Sadd
23	MF	Assim Madibo	22 October 1996 (aged 26)	43	0	(Qatar Football Association) Al-Duhail
24	MF	Naif Al-Hadhrami	18 July 2001 (aged 21)	1	0	(Qatar Football Association) Al-Rayyan
25	MF	Jassem Gaber	20 February 2002 (aged 20)	0	0	(Qatar Football Association) Al-Arabi
26	MF	Mostafa Meshaal	28 March 2001 (aged 21)	1	0	(Qatar Football Association) Al-Sadd

=== Senegal ===
Coach: Aliou Cissé

Senegal announced their final squad on 11 November 2022. Sadio Mané withdrew injured on 17 November, and was replaced by Moussa N'Diaye on 20 November.

No.	Pos.	Player	Date of birth (age)	Caps	Goals	Club
1	GK	Seny Dieng	23 November 1994 (aged 27)	4	0	(The Football Association) Queens Park Rangers
2	DF	Formose Mendy	2 January 2001 (aged 21)	2	0	(French Football Federation) Amiens
3	DF	Kalidou Koulibaly (captain)	20 June 1991 (aged 31)	64	0	(The Football Association) Chelsea
4	DF	Pape Abou Cissé	14 September 1995 (aged 27)	13	1	(Hellenic Football Federation) Olympiacos
5	MF	Idrissa Gueye	26 September 1989 (aged 33)	96	7	(The Football Association) Everton
6	MF	Nampalys Mendy	23 June 1992 (aged 30)	19	0	(The Football Association) Leicester City
7	FW	Nicolas Jackson	20 June 2001 (aged 21)	0	0	(Royal Spanish Football Federation) Villarreal
8	DF	Cheikhou Kouyaté	21 December 1989 (aged 32)	83	4	(The Football Association) Nottingham Forest
9	FW	Boulaye Dia	16 November 1996 (aged 26)	19	3	(Italian Football Federation) Salernitana
10	DF	Moussa N'Diaye	18 June 2002 (aged 20)	0	0	(Royal Belgian Football Association) Anderlecht
11	MF	Pathé Ciss	16 March 1994 (aged 28)	1	0	(Royal Spanish Football Federation) Rayo Vallecano
12	DF	Fodé Ballo-Touré	3 January 1997 (aged 25)	14	0	(Italian Football Federation) Milan
13	FW	Iliman Ndiaye	6 March 2000 (aged 22)	2	0	(The Football Association) Sheffield United
14	DF	Ismail Jakobs	17 August 1999 (aged 23)	2	0	(French Football Federation) Monaco
15	MF	Krépin Diatta	25 February 1999 (aged 23)	26	2	(French Football Federation) Monaco
16	GK	Édouard Mendy	1 March 1992 (aged 30)	25	0	(The Football Association) Chelsea
17	MF	Pape Matar Sarr	14 September 2002 (aged 20)	10	0	(The Football Association) Tottenham Hotspur
18	FW	Ismaïla Sarr	25 February 1998 (aged 24)	48	10	(The Football Association) Watford
19	FW	Famara Diédhiou	15 December 1992 (aged 29)	25	10	(Turkish Football Federation) Alanyaspor
20	FW	Bamba Dieng	23 March 2000 (aged 22)	13	1	(French Football Federation) Marseille
21	DF	Youssouf Sabaly	5 March 1993 (aged 29)	24	0	(Royal Spanish Football Federation) Real Betis
22	DF	Abdou Diallo	4 May 1996 (aged 26)	18	2	(German Football Association) RB Leipzig
23	GK	Alfred Gomis	5 September 1993 (aged 29)	13	0	(French Football Federation) Rennes
24	DF	Moustapha Name	5 May 1995 (aged 27)	6	0	(Cyprus Football Association) Pafos
25	MF	Mamadou Loum	30 December 1996 (aged 25)	3	0	(The Football Association) Reading
26	MF	Pape Gueye	24 January 1999 (aged 23)	12	0	(French Football Federation) Marseille

== Group B ==
=== England ===
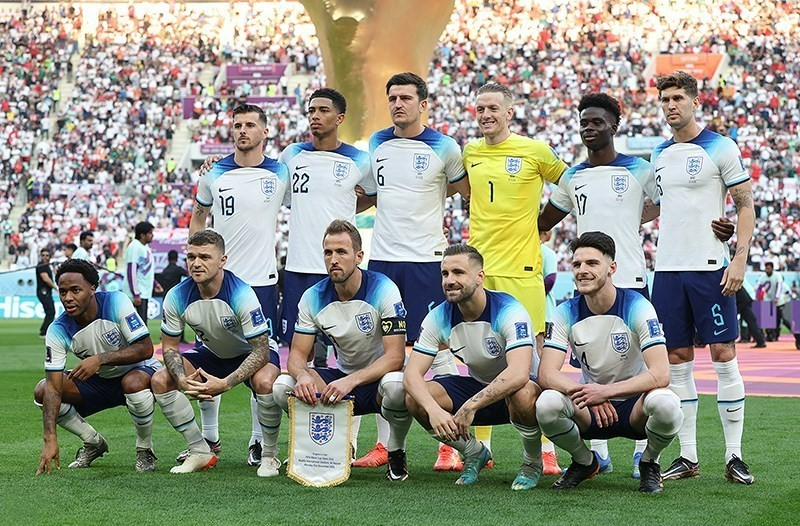
The England starting XI for their first group match

Coach: Gareth Southgate

England announced their final squad on 10 November 2022. Ben White withdrew from the squad on 30 November for personal reasons.

No.	Pos.	Player	Date of birth (age)	Caps	Goals	Club
1	GK	Jordan Pickford	7 March 1994 (aged 28)	45	0	(The Football Association) Everton
2	DF	Kyle Walker	28 May 1990 (aged 32)	70	0	(The Football Association) Manchester City
3	DF	Luke Shaw	12 July 1995 (aged 27)	23	3	(The Football Association) Manchester United
4	MF	Declan Rice	14 January 1999 (aged 23)	34	2	(The Football Association) West Ham United
5	DF	John Stones	28 May 1994 (aged 28)	59	3	(The Football Association) Manchester City
6	DF	Harry Maguire	5 March 1993 (aged 29)	48	7	(The Football Association) Manchester United
7	FW	Jack Grealish	10 September 1995 (aged 27)	24	1	(The Football Association) Manchester City
8	MF	Jordan Henderson	17 June 1990 (aged 32)	70	2	(The Football Association) Liverpool
9	FW	Harry Kane (captain)	28 July 1993 (aged 29)	75	51	(The Football Association) Tottenham Hotspur
10	FW	Raheem Sterling	8 December 1994 (aged 27)	79	19	(The Football Association) Chelsea
11	FW	Marcus Rashford	31 October 1997 (aged 25)	46	12	(The Football Association) Manchester United
12	DF	Kieran Trippier	19 September 1990 (aged 32)	37	1	(The Football Association) Newcastle United
13	GK	Nick Pope	19 April 1992 (aged 30)	10	0	(The Football Association) Newcastle United
14	MF	Kalvin Phillips	2 December 1995 (aged 26)	23	0	(The Football Association) Manchester City
15	DF	Eric Dier	15 January 1994 (aged 28)	47	3	(The Football Association) Tottenham Hotspur
16	DF	Conor Coady	25 February 1993 (aged 29)	10	1	(The Football Association) Everton
17	FW	Bukayo Saka	5 September 2001 (aged 21)	20	4	(The Football Association) Arsenal
18	DF	Trent Alexander-Arnold	7 October 1998 (aged 24)	17	1	(The Football Association) Liverpool
19	MF	Mason Mount	10 January 1999 (aged 23)	32	5	(The Football Association) Chelsea
20	MF	Phil Foden	28 May 2000 (aged 22)	18	2	(The Football Association) Manchester City
21	DF	Ben White	8 October 1997 (aged 25)	4	0	(The Football Association) Arsenal
22	MF	Jude Bellingham	29 June 2003 (aged 19)	17	0	(German Football Association) Borussia Dortmund
23	GK	Aaron Ramsdale	14 May 1998 (aged 24)	3	0	(The Football Association) Arsenal
24	FW	Callum Wilson	27 February 1992 (aged 30)	4	1	(The Football Association) Newcastle United
25	MF	James Maddison	23 November 1996 (aged 25)	1	0	(The Football Association) Leicester City
26	MF	Conor Gallagher	6 February 2000 (aged 22)	4	0	(The Football Association) Chelsea

=== Iran ===
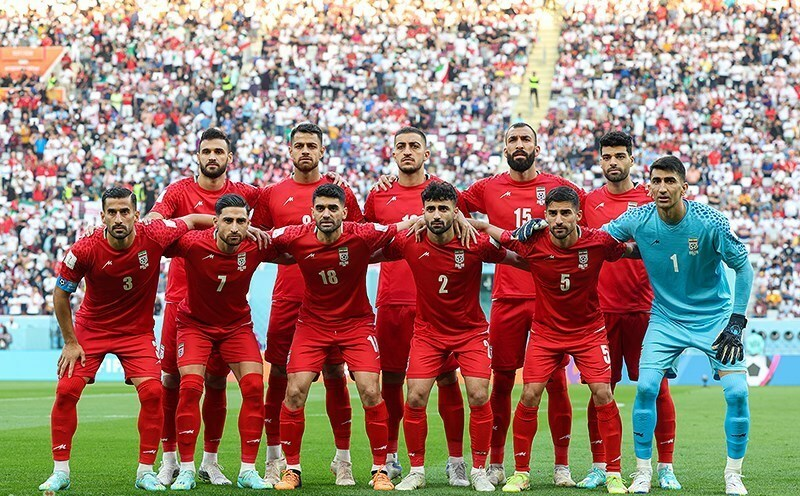
The Iran starting XI for their first group match

Coach: (Portugal) Carlos Queiroz

Iran announced their final squad, containing 25 players rather than the allowed 26, on 13 November 2022.

No.	Pos.	Player	Date of birth (age)	Caps	Goals	Club
1	GK	Alireza Beiranvand	21 September 1992 (aged 30)	52	0	(Football Federation Islamic Republic of Iran) Persepolis
2	DF	Sadegh Moharrami	1 March 1996 (aged 26)	21	0	(Croatian Football Federation) Dinamo Zagreb
3	DF	Ehsan Hajsafi (captain)	25 February 1990 (aged 32)	121	7	(Hellenic Football Federation) AEK Athens
4	DF	Shojae Khalilzadeh	14 May 1989 (aged 33)	25	1	(Qatar Football Association) Al-Ahli Doha
5	DF	Milad Mohammadi	29 September 1993 (aged 29)	45	1	(Hellenic Football Federation) AEK Athens
6	MF	Saeid Ezatolahi	1 October 1996 (aged 26)	47	1	(Danish Football Association) Vejle
7	MF	Alireza Jahanbakhsh	11 August 1993 (aged 29)	64	13	(Royal Dutch Football Association) Feyenoord
8	DF	Morteza Pouraliganji	19 April 1992 (aged 30)	46	3	(Football Federation Islamic Republic of Iran) Persepolis
9	FW	Mehdi Taremi	18 July 1992 (aged 30)	60	28	(Portuguese Football Federation) Porto
10	FW	Karim Ansarifard	3 April 1990 (aged 32)	94	29	(Cyprus Football Association) Omonia
11	MF	Vahid Amiri	2 April 1988 (aged 34)	68	2	(Football Federation Islamic Republic of Iran) Persepolis
12	GK	Payam Niazmand	6 April 1995 (aged 27)	1	0	(Football Federation Islamic Republic of Iran) Sepahan
13	DF	Hossein Kanaanizadegan	23 March 1994 (aged 28)	35	2	(Qatar Football Association) Al-Ahli Doha
14	MF	Saman Ghoddos	6 September 1993 (aged 29)	33	2	(The Football Association) Brentford
15	DF	Rouzbeh Cheshmi	24 July 1993 (aged 29)	19	1	(Football Federation Islamic Republic of Iran) Esteghlal
16	MF	Mehdi Torabi	10 September 1994 (aged 28)	36	7	(Football Federation Islamic Republic of Iran) Persepolis
17	MF	Ali Gholizadeh	10 March 1996 (aged 26)	26	6	(Royal Belgian Football Association) Charleroi
18	MF	Ali Karimi	11 February 1994 (aged 28)	13	0	(Turkish Football Federation) Kayserispor
19	DF	Majid Hosseini	20 June 1996 (aged 26)	18	0	(Turkish Football Federation) Kayserispor
20	FW	Sardar Azmoun	1 January 1995 (aged 27)	65	41	(German Football Association) Bayer Leverkusen
21	MF	Ahmad Nourollahi	1 February 1993 (aged 29)	25	3	(United Arab Emirates Football Association) Shabab Al-Ahli
22	GK	Amir Abedzadeh	26 April 1993 (aged 29)	11	0	(Royal Spanish Football Federation) Ponferradina
23	DF	Ramin Rezaeian	21 March 1990 (aged 32)	46	2	(Football Federation Islamic Republic of Iran) Sepahan
24	GK	Hossein Hosseini	30 June 1992 (aged 30)	6	0	(Football Federation Islamic Republic of Iran) Esteghlal
25	DF	Abolfazl Jalali	26 June 1998 (aged 24)	3	0	(Football Federation Islamic Republic of Iran) Esteghlal

=== United States ===
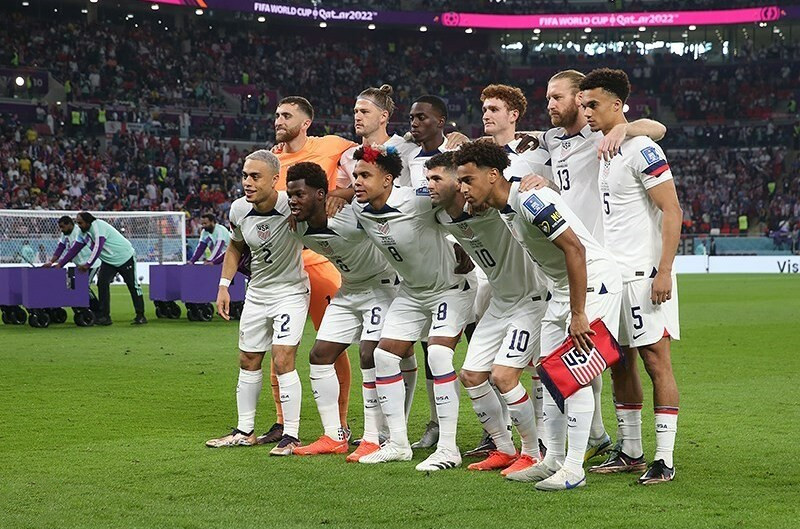
The United States starting XI for their first group match

Coach: Gregg Berhalter

The United States announced their final squad on 9 November 2022.

No.	Pos.	Player	Date of birth (age)	Caps	Goals	Club
1	GK	Matt Turner	24 June 1994 (aged 28)	20	0	(The Football Association) Arsenal
2	DF	Sergiño Dest	3 November 2000 (aged 22)	19	2	(Italian Football Federation) Milan
3	DF	Walker Zimmerman	19 May 1993 (aged 29)	33	3	(United States Soccer Federation) Nashville SC
4	MF	Tyler Adams (captain)	14 February 1999 (aged 23)	32	1	(The Football Association) Leeds United
5	DF	Antonee Robinson	8 August 1997 (aged 25)	29	2	(The Football Association) Fulham
6	MF	Yunus Musah	29 November 2002 (aged 19)	19	0	(Royal Spanish Football Federation) Valencia
7	FW	Giovanni Reyna	13 November 2002 (aged 20)	14	4	(German Football Association) Borussia Dortmund
8	MF	Weston McKennie	28 August 1998 (aged 24)	37	9	(Italian Football Federation) Juventus
9	FW	Jesús Ferreira	24 December 2000 (aged 21)	15	7	(United States Soccer Federation) FC Dallas
10	FW	Christian Pulisic	18 September 1998 (aged 24)	52	21	(The Football Association) Chelsea
11	FW	Brenden Aaronson	22 October 2000 (aged 22)	24	6	(The Football Association) Leeds United
12	GK	Ethan Horvath	9 June 1995 (aged 27)	8	0	(The Football Association) Luton Town
13	DF	Tim Ream	5 October 1987 (aged 35)	46	1	(The Football Association) Fulham
14	MF	Luca de la Torre	23 May 1998 (aged 24)	12	0	(Royal Spanish Football Federation) Celta Vigo
15	DF	Aaron Long	12 October 1992 (aged 30)	29	3	(United States Soccer Federation) New York Red Bulls
16	FW	Jordan Morris	26 October 1994 (aged 28)	49	11	(United States Soccer Federation) Seattle Sounders FC
17	MF	Cristian Roldan	3 June 1995 (aged 27)	32	0	(United States Soccer Federation) Seattle Sounders FC
18	DF	Shaq Moore	2 November 1996 (aged 26)	15	1	(United States Soccer Federation) Nashville SC
19	FW	Haji Wright	27 March 1998 (aged 24)	3	1	(Turkish Football Federation) Antalyaspor
20	DF	Cameron Carter-Vickers	31 December 1997 (aged 24)	11	0	(Scottish Football Association) Celtic
21	FW	Timothy Weah	22 February 2000 (aged 22)	25	3	(French Football Federation) Lille
22	DF	DeAndre Yedlin	9 July 1993 (aged 29)	75	0	(United States Soccer Federation) Inter Miami CF
23	MF	Kellyn Acosta	24 July 1995 (aged 27)	53	2	(United States Soccer Federation) Los Angeles FC
24	FW	Josh Sargent	20 February 2000 (aged 22)	20	5	(The Football Association) Norwich City
25	GK	Sean Johnson	31 May 1989 (aged 33)	10	0	(United States Soccer Federation) New York City FC
26	DF	Joe Scally	31 December 2002 (aged 19)	3	0	(German Football Association) Borussia Mönchengladbach

=== Wales ===
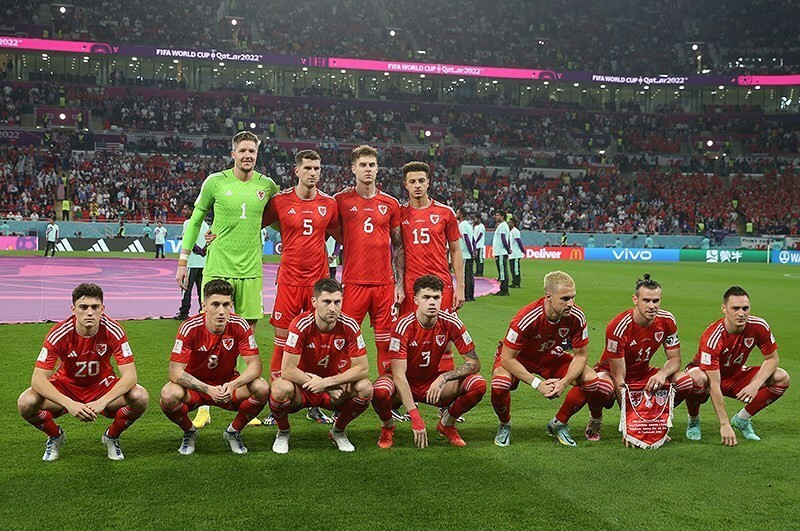
The Wales starting XI for their first group match

Coach: Rob Page

Wales announced their final squad on 9 November 2022.

No.	Pos.	Player	Date of birth (age)	Caps	Goals	Club
1	GK	Wayne Hennessey	24 January 1987 (aged 35)	106	0	(The Football Association) Nottingham Forest
2	DF	Chris Gunter	21 July 1989 (aged 33)	109	0	(The Football Association) AFC Wimbledon
3	DF	Neco Williams	13 April 2001 (aged 21)	23	2	(The Football Association) Nottingham Forest
4	DF	Ben Davies	24 April 1993 (aged 29)	74	1	(The Football Association) Tottenham Hotspur
5	DF	Chris Mepham	5 November 1997 (aged 25)	33	0	(The Football Association) Bournemouth
6	DF	Joe Rodon	22 October 1997 (aged 25)	30	0	(French Football Federation) Rennes
7	MF	Joe Allen	14 March 1990 (aged 32)	72	2	(Football Association of Wales) Swansea City
8	MF	Harry Wilson	22 March 1997 (aged 25)	39	5	(The Football Association) Fulham
9	FW	Brennan Johnson	23 May 2001 (aged 21)	15	2	(The Football Association) Nottingham Forest
10	MF	Aaron Ramsey	26 December 1990 (aged 31)	75	20	(French Football Federation) Nice
11	FW	Gareth Bale (captain)	16 July 1989 (aged 33)	108	40	(United States Soccer Federation) Los Angeles FC
12	GK	Danny Ward	22 June 1993 (aged 29)	26	0	(The Football Association) Leicester City
13	FW	Kieffer Moore	8 August 1992 (aged 30)	28	9	(The Football Association) Bournemouth
14	DF	Connor Roberts	23 September 1995 (aged 27)	41	3	(The Football Association) Burnley
15	DF	Ethan Ampadu	14 September 2000 (aged 22)	37	0	(Italian Football Federation) Spezia
16	MF	Joe Morrell	3 January 1997 (aged 25)	30	0	(The Football Association) Portsmouth
17	DF	Tom Lockyer	3 December 1994 (aged 27)	14	0	(The Football Association) Luton Town
18	MF	Jonny Williams	9 October 1993 (aged 29)	33	2	(The Football Association) Swindon Town
19	FW	Mark Harris	29 December 1998 (aged 23)	5	0	(Football Association of Wales) Cardiff City
20	FW	Daniel James	10 November 1997 (aged 25)	38	5	(The Football Association) Fulham
21	GK	Adam Davies	17 July 1992 (aged 30)	4	0	(The Football Association) Sheffield United
22	MF	Sorba Thomas	25 January 1999 (aged 23)	6	0	(The Football Association) Huddersfield Town
23	MF	Dylan Levitt	17 November 2000 (aged 22)	13	0	(Scottish Football Association) Dundee United
24	DF	Ben Cabango	30 May 2000 (aged 22)	5	0	(Football Association of Wales) Swansea City
25	MF	Rubin Colwill	27 April 2002 (aged 20)	7	1	(Football Association of Wales) Cardiff City
26	MF	Matthew Smith	22 November 1999 (aged 22)	19	0	(The Football Association) Milton Keynes Dons

== Group C ==
=== Argentina ===
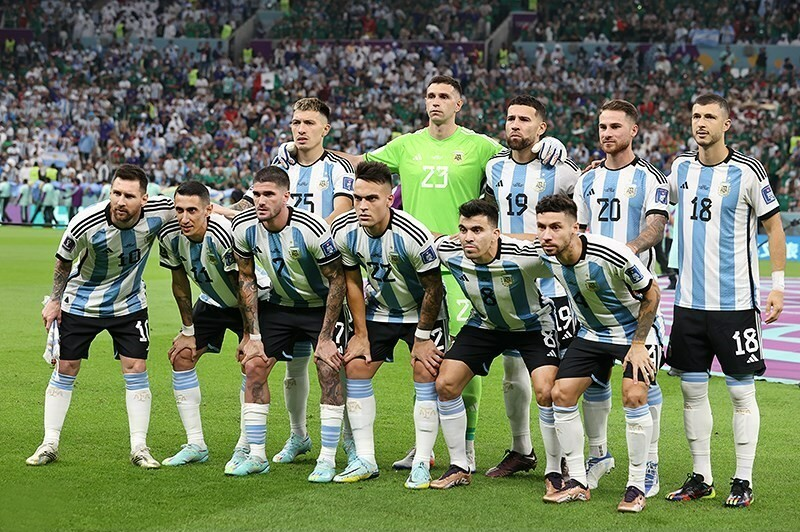
The Argentina starting XI for their second group match

Coach: Lionel Scaloni

Argentina announced their final squad on 11 November 2022. Nicolás González withdrew injured and was replaced by Ángel Correa on 17 November. On the same day, Joaquín Correa withdrew injured, and was replaced by Thiago Almada on 18 November.

No.	Pos.	Player	Date of birth (age)	Caps	Goals	Club
1	GK	Franco Armani	16 October 1986 (aged 36)	18	0	(Argentine Football Association) River Plate
2	DF	Juan Foyth	12 January 1998 (aged 24)	16	0	(Royal Spanish Football Federation) Villarreal
3	DF	Nicolás Tagliafico	31 August 1992 (aged 30)	42	0	(French Football Federation) Lyon
4	DF	Gonzalo Montiel	1 January 1997 (aged 25)	18	0	(Royal Spanish Football Federation) Sevilla
5	MF	Leandro Paredes	29 June 1994 (aged 28)	46	4	(Italian Football Federation) Juventus
6	DF	Germán Pezzella	27 June 1991 (aged 31)	32	2	(Royal Spanish Football Federation) Real Betis
7	MF	Rodrigo De Paul	24 May 1994 (aged 28)	44	2	(Royal Spanish Football Federation) Atlético Madrid
8	DF	Marcos Acuña	28 October 1991 (aged 31)	43	0	(Royal Spanish Football Federation) Sevilla
9	FW	Julián Alvarez	31 January 2000 (aged 22)	12	3	(The Football Association) Manchester City
10	FW	Lionel Messi (captain)	24 June 1987 (aged 35)	165	91	(French Football Federation) Paris Saint-Germain
11	FW	Ángel Di María (vice-captain)	14 February 1988 (aged 34)	124	27	(Italian Football Federation) Juventus
12	GK	Gerónimo Rulli	20 May 1992 (aged 30)	4	0	(Royal Spanish Football Federation) Villarreal
13	DF	Cristian Romero	27 April 1998 (aged 24)	12	1	(The Football Association) Tottenham Hotspur
14	MF	Exequiel Palacios	5 October 1998 (aged 24)	20	0	(German Football Association) Bayer Leverkusen
15	FW	Ángel Correa	9 March 1995 (aged 27)	22	3	(Royal Spanish Football Federation) Atlético Madrid
16	MF	Thiago Almada	26 April 2001 (aged 21)	1	0	(United States Soccer Federation) Atlanta United FC
17	MF	Papu Gómez	15 February 1988 (aged 34)	15	3	(Royal Spanish Football Federation) Sevilla
18	MF	Guido Rodríguez	12 April 1994 (aged 28)	26	1	(Royal Spanish Football Federation) Real Betis
19	DF	Nicolás Otamendi	12 February 1988 (aged 34)	93	4	(Portuguese Football Federation) Benfica
20	MF	Alexis Mac Allister	24 December 1998 (aged 23)	8	0	(The Football Association) Brighton & Hove Albion
21	FW	Paulo Dybala	15 November 1993 (aged 29)	34	3	(Italian Football Federation) Roma
22	FW	Lautaro Martínez	22 August 1997 (aged 25)	40	21	(Italian Football Federation) Inter Milan
23	GK	Emiliano Martínez	2 September 1992 (aged 30)	19	0	(The Football Association) Aston Villa
24	MF	Enzo Fernández	17 January 2001 (aged 21)	3	0	(Portuguese Football Federation) Benfica
25	DF	Lisandro Martínez	18 January 1998 (aged 24)	10	0	(The Football Association) Manchester United
26	DF	Nahuel Molina	6 April 1998 (aged 24)	20	0	(Royal Spanish Football Federation) Atlético Madrid

=== Mexico ===
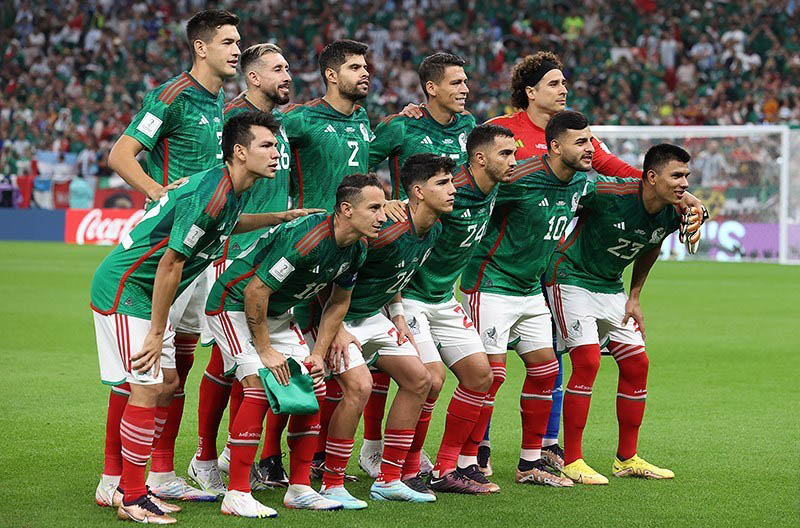
The Mexico starting XI for their second group match

Coach: (Argentina) Gerardo Martino

Mexico announced a 31-man preliminary squad on 26 October 2022. The squad was reduced to 30 players on 9 November as Jesús Corona withdrew injured. The final squad was announced on 14 November.

No.	Pos.	Player	Date of birth (age)	Caps	Goals	Club
1	GK	Alfredo Talavera	18 September 1982 (aged 40)	40	0	(Mexican Football Federation) Juárez
2	DF	Néstor Araujo	29 August 1991 (aged 31)	63	3	(Mexican Football Federation) América
3	DF	César Montes	24 February 1997 (aged 25)	30	1	(Mexican Football Federation) Monterrey
4	DF	Edson Álvarez	24 October 1997 (aged 25)	58	3	(Royal Dutch Football Association) Ajax
5	DF	Johan Vásquez	22 October 1998 (aged 24)	7	0	(Italian Football Federation) Cremonese
6	DF	Gerardo Arteaga	7 September 1998 (aged 24)	17	1	(Royal Belgian Football Association) Genk
7	MF	Luis Romo	5 June 1995 (aged 27)	27	1	(Mexican Football Federation) Monterrey
8	MF	Carlos Rodríguez	3 January 1997 (aged 25)	36	0	(Mexican Football Federation) Cruz Azul
9	FW	Raúl Jiménez	5 May 1991 (aged 31)	95	29	(The Football Association) Wolverhampton Wanderers
10	FW	Alexis Vega	25 November 1997 (aged 24)	22	6	(Mexican Football Federation) Guadalajara
11	FW	Rogelio Funes Mori	5 March 1991 (aged 31)	16	6	(Mexican Football Federation) Monterrey
12	GK	Rodolfo Cota	3 July 1987 (aged 35)	8	0	(Mexican Football Federation) León
13	GK	Guillermo Ochoa	13 July 1985 (aged 37)	131	0	(Mexican Football Federation) América
14	MF	Érick Gutiérrez	15 June 1995 (aged 27)	34	1	(Royal Dutch Football Association) PSV Eindhoven
15	DF	Héctor Moreno	17 January 1988 (aged 34)	128	5	(Mexican Football Federation) Monterrey
16	MF	Héctor Herrera	19 April 1990 (aged 32)	102	10	(United States Soccer Federation) Houston Dynamo FC
17	FW	Orbelín Pineda	24 March 1996 (aged 26)	50	6	(Hellenic Football Federation) AEK Athens
18	MF	Andrés Guardado (captain)	28 September 1986 (aged 36)	178	28	(Royal Spanish Football Federation) Real Betis
19	DF	Jorge Sánchez	10 December 1997 (aged 24)	26	1	(Royal Dutch Football Association) Ajax
20	FW	Henry Martín	18 November 1992 (aged 30)	27	6	(Mexican Football Federation) América
21	FW	Uriel Antuna	21 August 1997 (aged 25)	36	9	(Mexican Football Federation) Cruz Azul
22	FW	Hirving Lozano	30 July 1995 (aged 27)	60	16	(Italian Football Federation) Napoli
23	DF	Jesús Gallardo	15 August 1994 (aged 28)	78	1	(Mexican Football Federation) Monterrey
24	MF	Luis Chávez	15 January 1996 (aged 26)	9	0	(Mexican Football Federation) Pachuca
25	FW	Roberto Alvarado	7 September 1998 (aged 24)	31	4	(Mexican Football Federation) Guadalajara
26	DF	Kevin Álvarez	15 January 1999 (aged 23)	8	0	(Mexican Football Federation) Pachuca

=== Poland ===
Coach: Czesław Michniewicz

Poland announced a 47-man preliminary squad on 20 October 2022. The final squad was announced on 10 November. Bartłomiej Drągowski withdrew injured and was replaced by Kamil Grabara on 13 November.

No.	Pos.	Player	Date of birth (age)	Caps	Goals	Club
1	GK	Wojciech Szczęsny	18 April 1990 (aged 32)	66	0	(Italian Football Federation) Juventus
2	DF	Matty Cash	7 August 1997 (aged 25)	7	1	(The Football Association) Aston Villa
3	DF	Artur Jędrzejczyk	4 November 1987 (aged 35)	40	3	(Polish Football Association) Legia Warsaw
4	DF	Mateusz Wieteska	11 February 1997 (aged 25)	2	0	(French Football Federation) Clermont
5	DF	Jan Bednarek	12 April 1996 (aged 26)	45	1	(The Football Association) Aston Villa
6	MF	Krystian Bielik	4 January 1998 (aged 24)	5	0	(The Football Association) Birmingham City
7	FW	Arkadiusz Milik	28 February 1994 (aged 28)	64	16	(Italian Football Federation) Juventus
8	MF	Damian Szymański	16 June 1995 (aged 27)	9	1	(Hellenic Football Federation) AEK Athens
9	FW	Robert Lewandowski (captain)	21 August 1988 (aged 34)	134	76	(Royal Spanish Football Federation) Barcelona
10	MF	Grzegorz Krychowiak	29 January 1990 (aged 32)	94	5	(Saudi Arabian Football Federation) Al-Shabab
11	MF	Kamil Grosicki	8 June 1988 (aged 34)	87	17	(Polish Football Association) Pogoń Szczecin
12	GK	Łukasz Skorupski	5 May 1991 (aged 31)	8	0	(Italian Football Federation) Bologna
13	MF	Jakub Kamiński	5 June 2002 (aged 20)	4	1	(German Football Association) VfL Wolfsburg
14	DF	Jakub Kiwior	15 February 2000 (aged 22)	5	0	(Italian Football Federation) Spezia
15	DF	Kamil Glik	3 February 1988 (aged 34)	99	6	(Italian Football Federation) Benevento
16	FW	Karol Świderski	23 January 1997 (aged 25)	18	8	(United States Soccer Federation) Charlotte FC
17	MF	Szymon Żurkowski	25 September 1997 (aged 25)	7	0	(Italian Football Federation) Fiorentina
18	DF	Bartosz Bereszyński	12 July 1992 (aged 30)	46	0	(Italian Football Federation) Sampdoria
19	MF	Sebastian Szymański	10 May 1999 (aged 23)	18	1	(Royal Dutch Football Association) Feyenoord
20	MF	Piotr Zieliński	20 May 1994 (aged 28)	74	9	(Italian Football Federation) Napoli
21	MF	Nicola Zalewski	23 January 2002 (aged 20)	7	0	(Italian Football Federation) Roma
22	GK	Kamil Grabara	8 January 1999 (aged 23)	1	0	(Danish Football Association) Copenhagen
23	FW	Krzysztof Piątek	1 July 1995 (aged 27)	25	11	(Italian Football Federation) Salernitana
24	MF	Przemysław Frankowski	12 April 1995 (aged 27)	26	1	(French Football Federation) Lens
25	DF	Robert Gumny	4 June 1998 (aged 24)	5	0	(German Football Association) FC Augsburg
26	MF	Michał Skóraś	15 February 2000 (aged 22)	1	0	(Polish Football Association) Lech Poznań

=== Saudi Arabia ===
Coach: (France) Hervé Renard

Saudi Arabia announced a 32-man preliminary squad on 16 October 2022. The final squad was announced on 11 November. Fahad Al-Muwallad was replaced by Nawaf Al-Abed on 13 November after WADA appealed the decision to lift Al-Muwallad's suspension.

No.	Pos.	Player	Date of birth (age)	Caps	Goals	Club
1	GK	Mohammed Al-Rubaie	14 August 1997 (aged 25)	7	0	(Saudi Arabian Football Federation) Al-Ahli
2	DF	Sultan Al-Ghannam	6 May 1994 (aged 28)	24	0	(Saudi Arabian Football Federation) Al-Nassr
3	DF	Abdullah Madu	15 July 1993 (aged 29)	15	0	(Saudi Arabian Football Federation) Al-Nassr
4	DF	Abdulelah Al-Amri	15 January 1997 (aged 25)	20	1	(Saudi Arabian Football Federation) Al-Nassr
5	DF	Ali Al-Bulaihi	21 November 1989 (aged 32)	37	0	(Saudi Arabian Football Federation) Al-Hilal
6	DF	Mohammed Al-Breik	15 September 1992 (aged 30)	40	1	(Saudi Arabian Football Federation) Al-Hilal
7	MF	Salman Al-Faraj (captain)	1 August 1989 (aged 33)	70	8	(Saudi Arabian Football Federation) Al-Hilal
8	MF	Abdulellah Al-Malki	11 October 1994 (aged 28)	27	0	(Saudi Arabian Football Federation) Al-Hilal
9	FW	Firas Al-Buraikan	14 May 2000 (aged 22)	26	6	(Saudi Arabian Football Federation) Al-Fateh
10	FW	Salem Al-Dawsari	19 August 1991 (aged 31)	71	17	(Saudi Arabian Football Federation) Al-Hilal
11	FW	Saleh Al-Shehri	1 November 1993 (aged 29)	20	10	(Saudi Arabian Football Federation) Al-Hilal
12	DF	Saud Abdulhamid	18 July 1999 (aged 23)	23	1	(Saudi Arabian Football Federation) Al-Hilal
13	DF	Yasser Al-Shahrani	25 May 1992 (aged 30)	72	2	(Saudi Arabian Football Federation) Al-Hilal
14	MF	Abdullah Otayf	3 August 1992 (aged 30)	45	1	(Saudi Arabian Football Federation) Al-Hilal
15	MF	Ali Al-Hassan	4 March 1997 (aged 25)	13	1	(Saudi Arabian Football Federation) Al-Nassr
16	MF	Sami Al-Najei	7 February 1997 (aged 25)	17	2	(Saudi Arabian Football Federation) Al-Nassr
17	DF	Hassan Al-Tambakti	9 February 1999 (aged 23)	19	0	(Saudi Arabian Football Federation) Al-Shabab
18	MF	Nawaf Al-Abed	26 January 1990 (aged 32)	55	8	(Saudi Arabian Football Federation) Al-Shabab
19	FW	Hattan Bahebri	16 July 1992 (aged 30)	41	4	(Saudi Arabian Football Federation) Al-Shabab
20	FW	Abdulrahman Al-Aboud	1 June 1995 (aged 27)	3	0	(Saudi Arabian Football Federation) Al-Ittihad
21	GK	Mohammed Al-Owais	10 October 1991 (aged 31)	42	0	(Saudi Arabian Football Federation) Al-Hilal
22	GK	Nawaf Al-Aqidi	10 May 2000 (aged 22)	0	0	(Saudi Arabian Football Federation) Al-Nassr
23	MF	Mohamed Kanno	22 September 1994 (aged 28)	38	1	(Saudi Arabian Football Federation) Al-Hilal
24	MF	Nasser Al-Dawsari	19 December 1998 (aged 23)	10	0	(Saudi Arabian Football Federation) Al-Hilal
25	FW	Haitham Asiri	25 March 2001 (aged 21)	8	1	(Saudi Arabian Football Federation) Al-Ahli
26	MF	Riyadh Sharahili	28 April 1993 (aged 29)	5	0	(Saudi Arabian Football Federation) Abha

== Group D ==
=== Australia ===
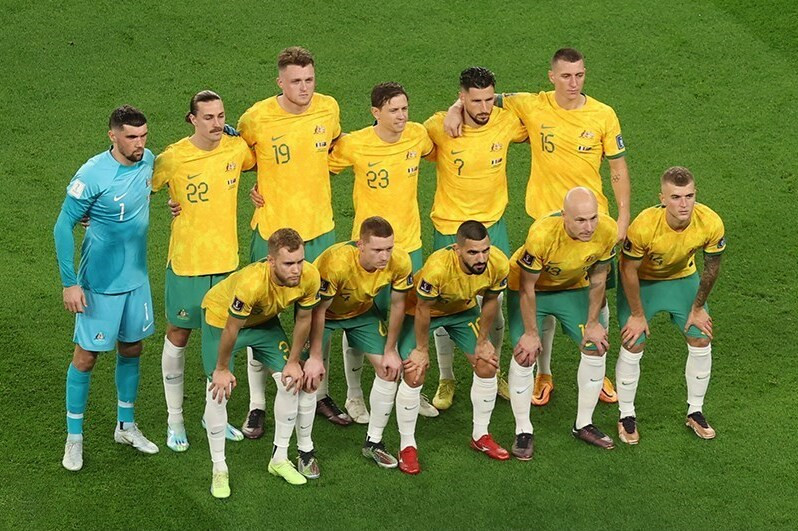
The Australia starting XI for their first group match

Coach: Graham Arnold

Australia announced their final squad on 8 November 2022. Martin Boyle withdrew injured and was replaced by Marco Tilio on 20 November.

No.	Pos.	Player	Date of birth (age)	Caps	Goals	Club
1	GK	Mathew Ryan (captain)	8 April 1992 (aged 30)	75	0	(Danish Football Association) Copenhagen
2	DF	Miloš Degenek	28 April 1994 (aged 28)	38	1	(United States Soccer Federation) Columbus Crew
3	DF	Nathaniel Atkinson	13 June 1999 (aged 23)	5	0	(Scottish Football Association) Heart of Midlothian
4	DF	Kye Rowles	24 June 1998 (aged 24)	3	0	(Scottish Football Association) Heart of Midlothian
5	DF	Fran Karačić	12 May 1996 (aged 26)	11	1	(Italian Football Federation) Brescia
6	FW	Marco Tilio	23 August 2001 (aged 21)	5	0	(Football Australia) Melbourne City
7	FW	Mathew Leckie	4 February 1991 (aged 31)	73	13	(Football Australia) Melbourne City
8	DF	Bailey Wright	28 July 1992 (aged 30)	27	2	(The Football Association) Sunderland
9	FW	Jamie Maclaren	29 July 1993 (aged 29)	26	8	(Football Australia) Melbourne City
10	MF	Ajdin Hrustic	5 July 1996 (aged 26)	20	3	(Italian Football Federation) Hellas Verona
11	FW	Awer Mabil	15 September 1995 (aged 27)	29	8	(Royal Spanish Football Federation) Cádiz
12	GK	Andrew Redmayne	13 January 1989 (aged 33)	4	0	(Football Australia) Sydney FC
13	MF	Aaron Mooy	15 September 1990 (aged 32)	53	7	(Scottish Football Association) Celtic
14	MF	Riley McGree	2 November 1998 (aged 24)	11	1	(The Football Association) Middlesbrough
15	FW	Mitchell Duke	18 January 1991 (aged 31)	21	8	(Japan Football Association) Fagiano Okayama
16	DF	Aziz Behich	16 December 1990 (aged 31)	53	2	(Scottish Football Association) Dundee United
17	MF	Cameron Devlin	7 June 1998 (aged 24)	1	0	(Scottish Football Association) Heart of Midlothian
18	GK	Danny Vukovic	27 March 1985 (aged 37)	4	0	(Football Australia) Central Coast Mariners
19	DF	Harry Souttar	22 October 1998 (aged 24)	10	6	(The Football Association) Stoke City
20	DF	Thomas Deng	20 March 1997 (aged 25)	2	0	(Japan Football Association) Albirex Niigata
21	FW	Garang Kuol	15 September 2004 (aged 18)	1	0	(Football Australia) Central Coast Mariners
22	MF	Jackson Irvine	7 March 1993 (aged 29)	49	7	(German Football Association) FC St. Pauli
23	FW	Craig Goodwin	16 December 1991 (aged 30)	10	1	(Football Australia) Adelaide United
24	DF	Joel King	30 October 2000 (aged 22)	4	0	(Danish Football Association) OB
25	FW	Jason Cummings	1 August 1995 (aged 27)	1	1	(Football Australia) Central Coast Mariners
26	MF	Keanu Baccus	7 June 1998 (aged 24)	1	0	(Scottish Football Association) St Mirren

=== Denmark ===
Coach: Kasper Hjulmand

Denmark announced 21 of the 26 players in their final squad on 7 November 2022. The final five players were announced on 13 November.

No.	Pos.	Player	Date of birth (age)	Caps	Goals	Club
1	GK	Kasper Schmeichel	5 November 1986 (aged 36)	86	0	(French Football Federation) Nice
2	DF	Joachim Andersen	31 May 1996 (aged 26)	19	0	(The Football Association) Crystal Palace
3	DF	Victor Nelsson	14 October 1998 (aged 24)	7	0	(Turkish Football Federation) Galatasaray
4	DF	Simon Kjær (captain)	26 March 1989 (aged 33)	121	5	(Italian Football Federation) Milan
5	DF	Joakim Mæhle	20 May 1997 (aged 25)	31	9	(Italian Football Federation) Atalanta
6	DF	Andreas Christensen	10 April 1996 (aged 26)	58	2	(Royal Spanish Football Federation) Barcelona
7	MF	Mathias Jensen	1 January 1996 (aged 26)	20	1	(The Football Association) Brentford
8	MF	Thomas Delaney	3 September 1991 (aged 31)	71	7	(Royal Spanish Football Federation) Sevilla
9	FW	Martin Braithwaite	5 June 1991 (aged 31)	62	10	(Royal Spanish Football Federation) Espanyol
10	MF	Christian Eriksen	14 February 1992 (aged 30)	117	39	(The Football Association) Manchester United
11	MF	Andreas Skov Olsen	29 December 1999 (aged 22)	23	8	(Royal Belgian Football Association) Club Brugge
12	FW	Kasper Dolberg	6 October 1997 (aged 25)	37	11	(Royal Spanish Football Federation) Sevilla
13	DF	Rasmus Kristensen	11 July 1997 (aged 25)	10	0	(The Football Association) Leeds United
14	MF	Mikkel Damsgaard	3 July 2000 (aged 22)	18	4	(The Football Association) Brentford
15	MF	Christian Nørgaard	10 March 1994 (aged 28)	17	1	(The Football Association) Brentford
16	GK	Oliver Christensen	22 March 1999 (aged 23)	1	0	(German Football Association) Hertha BSC
17	DF	Jens Stryger Larsen	21 February 1991 (aged 31)	49	3	(Turkish Football Federation) Trabzonspor
18	DF	Daniel Wass	31 May 1989 (aged 33)	44	1	(Danish Football Association) Brøndby
19	FW	Jonas Wind	7 February 1999 (aged 23)	15	5	(German Football Association) VfL Wolfsburg
20	FW	Yussuf Poulsen	15 June 1994 (aged 28)	68	11	(German Football Association) RB Leipzig
21	FW	Andreas Cornelius	16 March 1993 (aged 29)	41	9	(Danish Football Association) Copenhagen
22	GK	Frederik Rønnow	4 August 1992 (aged 30)	8	0	(German Football Association) Union Berlin
23	MF	Pierre-Emile Højbjerg	5 August 1995 (aged 27)	60	5	(The Football Association) Tottenham Hotspur
24	MF	Robert Skov	20 May 1996 (aged 26)	11	5	(German Football Association) 1899 Hoffenheim
25	MF	Jesper Lindstrøm	29 February 2000 (aged 22)	6	1	(German Football Association) Eintracht Frankfurt
26	DF	Alexander Bah	9 December 1997 (aged 24)	4	1	(Portuguese Football Federation) Benfica

=== France ===
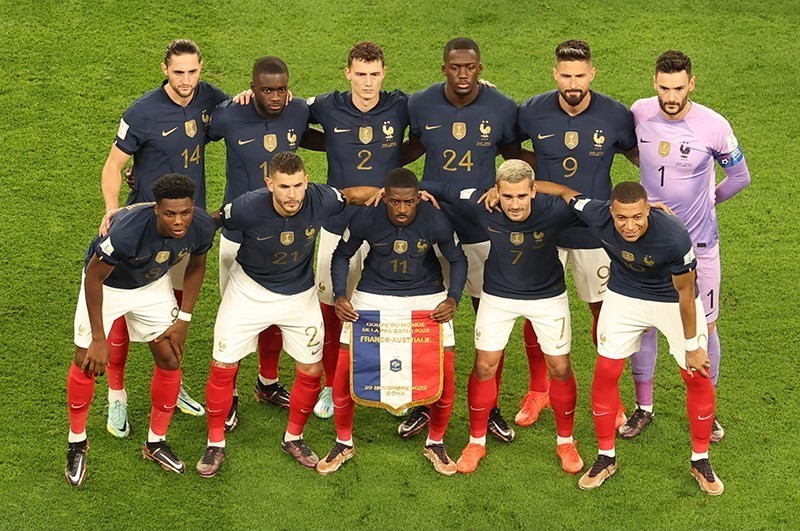
The France starting XI for their first group match

Coach: Didier Deschamps

France announced their 25-player final squad on 9 November 2022. The final squad was extended to 26 players on 14 November with the addition of Marcus Thuram. On the same day, Presnel Kimpembe withdrew injured and was replaced by Axel Disasi. Christopher Nkunku withdrew injured on 15 November, and was replaced by Randal Kolo Muani on 16 November. It was announced on 20 November that Karim Benzema had suffered an injury and was not expected to play any part in the tournament; he was not replaced in the squad.

No.	Pos.	Player	Date of birth (age)	Caps	Goals	Club
1	GK	Hugo Lloris (captain)	26 December 1986 (aged 35)	139	0	(The Football Association) Tottenham Hotspur
2	DF	Benjamin Pavard	28 March 1996 (aged 26)	46	2	(German Football Association) Bayern Munich
3	DF	Axel Disasi	11 March 1998 (aged 24)	0	0	(French Football Federation) Monaco
4	DF	Raphaël Varane	25 April 1993 (aged 29)	87	5	(The Football Association) Manchester United
5	DF	Jules Koundé	12 November 1998 (aged 24)	12	0	(Royal Spanish Football Federation) Barcelona
6	MF	Mattéo Guendouzi	14 April 1999 (aged 23)	6	1	(French Football Federation) Marseille
7	FW	Antoine Griezmann	21 March 1991 (aged 31)	110	42	(Royal Spanish Football Federation) Atlético Madrid
8	MF	Aurélien Tchouaméni	27 January 2000 (aged 22)	14	1	(Royal Spanish Football Federation) Real Madrid
9	FW	Olivier Giroud	30 September 1986 (aged 36)	114	49	(Italian Football Federation) Milan
10	FW	Kylian Mbappé	20 December 1998 (aged 23)	59	28	(French Football Federation) Paris Saint-Germain
11	FW	Ousmane Dembélé	15 May 1997 (aged 25)	28	4	(Royal Spanish Football Federation) Barcelona
12	FW	Randal Kolo Muani	5 December 1998 (aged 23)	2	0	(German Football Association) Eintracht Frankfurt
13	MF	Youssouf Fofana	10 January 1999 (aged 23)	2	0	(French Football Federation) Monaco
14	MF	Adrien Rabiot	3 April 1995 (aged 27)	29	2	(Italian Football Federation) Juventus
15	MF	Jordan Veretout	1 March 1993 (aged 29)	5	0	(French Football Federation) Marseille
16	GK	Steve Mandanda	28 March 1985 (aged 37)	34	0	(French Football Federation) Rennes
17	DF	William Saliba	24 March 2001 (aged 21)	7	0	(The Football Association) Arsenal
18	DF	Dayot Upamecano	27 October 1998 (aged 24)	7	1	(German Football Association) Bayern Munich
19	FW	Karim Benzema	19 December 1987 (aged 34)	97	37	(Royal Spanish Football Federation) Real Madrid
20	FW	Kingsley Coman	13 June 1996 (aged 26)	40	5	(German Football Association) Bayern Munich
21	DF	Lucas Hernandez	14 February 1996 (aged 26)	32	0	(German Football Association) Bayern Munich
22	DF	Théo Hernandez	6 October 1997 (aged 25)	7	1	(Italian Football Federation) Milan
23	GK	Alphonse Areola	27 February 1993 (aged 29)	5	0	(The Football Association) West Ham United
24	DF	Ibrahima Konaté	25 May 1999 (aged 23)	2	0	(The Football Association) Liverpool
25	MF	Eduardo Camavinga	10 November 2002 (aged 20)	4	1	(Royal Spanish Football Federation) Real Madrid
26	FW	Marcus Thuram	6 August 1997 (aged 25)	4	0	(German Football Association) Borussia Mönchengladbach

=== Tunisia ===
Coach: Jalel Kadri

Tunisia announced their final squad on 14 November 2022.

No.	Pos.	Player	Date of birth (age)	Caps	Goals	Club
1	GK	Aymen Mathlouthi	14 September 1984 (aged 38)	73	0	(Tunisian Football Federation) Étoile du Sahel
2	DF	Bilel Ifa	9 March 1990 (aged 32)	37	0	(Kuwait Football Association) Kuwait SC
3	DF	Montassar Talbi	26 May 1998 (aged 24)	23	1	(French Football Federation) Lorient
4	DF	Yassine Meriah	2 July 1993 (aged 29)	61	3	(Tunisian Football Federation) Espérance de Tunis
5	MF	Nader Ghandri	18 February 1995 (aged 27)	8	0	(Tunisian Football Federation) Club Africain
6	DF	Dylan Bronn	19 June 1995 (aged 27)	36	2	(Italian Football Federation) Salernitana
7	FW	Youssef Msakni (captain)	28 October 1990 (aged 32)	88	17	(Qatar Football Association) Al-Arabi
8	MF	Hannibal Mejbri	21 January 2003 (aged 19)	19	0	(The Football Association) Birmingham City
9	FW	Issam Jebali	25 December 1991 (aged 30)	10	2	(Danish Football Association) OB
10	FW	Wahbi Khazri	8 February 1991 (aged 31)	72	24	(French Football Federation) Montpellier
11	FW	Taha Yassine Khenissi	6 January 1992 (aged 30)	48	9	(Kuwait Football Association) Kuwait SC
12	DF	Ali Maâloul	1 January 1990 (aged 32)	83	2	(Egyptian Football Association) Al Ahly
13	MF	Ferjani Sassi	18 March 1992 (aged 30)	78	6	(Qatar Football Association) Al-Duhail
14	MF	Aïssa Laïdouni	13 December 1996 (aged 25)	25	1	(Hungarian Football Federation) Ferencváros
15	MF	Mohamed Ali Ben Romdhane	6 September 1999 (aged 23)	23	1	(Tunisian Football Federation) Espérance de Tunis
16	GK	Aymen Dahmen	28 January 1997 (aged 25)	5	0	(Tunisian Football Federation) CS Sfaxien
17	MF	Ellyes Skhiri	10 May 1995 (aged 27)	49	3	(German Football Association) 1. FC Köln
18	MF	Ghailene Chaalali	28 February 1994 (aged 28)	31	1	(Tunisian Football Federation) Espérance de Tunis
19	FW	Seifeddine Jaziri	12 February 1993 (aged 29)	29	10	(Egyptian Football Association) Zamalek
20	DF	Mohamed Dräger	25 June 1996 (aged 26)	34	3	(Swiss Football Association) Luzern
21	DF	Wajdi Kechrida	5 November 1995 (aged 27)	19	0	(Hellenic Football Federation) Atromitos
22	GK	Bechir Ben Saïd	29 November 1992 (aged 29)	10	0	(Tunisian Football Federation) US Monastir
23	FW	Naïm Sliti	27 July 1992 (aged 30)	69	14	(Saudi Arabian Football Federation) Al-Ettifaq
24	DF	Ali Abdi	20 December 1993 (aged 28)	10	2	(French Football Federation) Caen
25	FW	Anis Ben Slimane	16 March 2001 (aged 21)	25	4	(Danish Football Association) Brøndby
26	GK	Mouez Hassen	5 March 1995 (aged 27)	20	0	(Tunisian Football Federation) Club Africain

== Group E ==
=== Costa Rica ===
Coach: (Colombia) Luis Fernando Suárez

Costa Rica announced their final squad on 3 November 2022.

No.	Pos.	Player	Date of birth (age)	Caps	Goals	Club
1	GK	Keylor Navas	15 December 1986 (aged 35)	107	0	(French Football Federation) Paris Saint-Germain
2	MF	Daniel Chacón	11 April 2001 (aged 21)	8	0	(Costa Rican Football Federation) Cartaginés
3	DF	Juan Pablo Vargas	6 June 1995 (aged 27)	12	1	(Colombian Football Federation) Millonarios
4	DF	Keysher Fuller	12 July 1994 (aged 28)	31	2	(Costa Rican Football Federation) Herediano
5	MF	Celso Borges	27 May 1988 (aged 34)	155	27	(Costa Rican Football Federation) Alajuelense
6	DF	Óscar Duarte	3 June 1989 (aged 33)	71	4	(Saudi Arabian Football Federation) Al-Wehda
7	FW	Anthony Contreras	29 January 2000 (aged 22)	9	2	(Costa Rican Football Federation) Herediano
8	DF	Bryan Oviedo	18 February 1990 (aged 32)	76	2	(United States Soccer Federation) Real Salt Lake
9	MF	Jewison Bennette	15 June 2004 (aged 18)	7	2	(The Football Association) Sunderland
10	MF	Bryan Ruiz (captain)	18 August 1985 (aged 37)	146	29	(Costa Rican Football Federation) Alajuelense
11	FW	Johan Venegas	27 November 1988 (aged 33)	82	11	(Costa Rican Football Federation) Alajuelense
12	FW	Joel Campbell	26 June 1992 (aged 30)	119	25	(Mexican Football Federation) León
13	MF	Gerson Torres	28 August 1997 (aged 25)	13	1	(Costa Rican Football Federation) Herediano
14	MF	Youstin Salas	17 June 1996 (aged 26)	4	0	(Costa Rican Football Federation) Saprissa
15	DF	Francisco Calvo	8 July 1992 (aged 30)	75	8	(Turkish Football Federation) Konyaspor
16	DF	Carlos Martínez	30 March 1999 (aged 23)	7	0	(Costa Rican Football Federation) San Carlos
17	MF	Yeltsin Tejeda	17 March 1992 (aged 30)	73	0	(Costa Rican Football Federation) Herediano
18	GK	Esteban Alvarado	28 April 1989 (aged 33)	25	0	(Costa Rican Football Federation) Herediano
19	DF	Kendall Waston	1 January 1988 (aged 34)	63	9	(Costa Rican Football Federation) Saprissa
20	MF	Brandon Aguilera	28 June 2003 (aged 19)	4	0	(Costa Rican Football Federation) Guanacasteca
21	MF	Douglas López	21 September 1998 (aged 24)	3	0	(Costa Rican Football Federation) Herediano
22	DF	Rónald Matarrita	9 July 1994 (aged 28)	52	3	(United States Soccer Federation) FC Cincinnati
23	GK	Patrick Sequeira	1 March 1999 (aged 23)	2	0	(Royal Spanish Football Federation) Lugo
24	MF	Roan Wilson	1 May 2002 (aged 20)	3	0	(Costa Rican Football Federation) Municipal Grecia
25	MF	Anthony Hernández	11 October 2001 (aged 21)	3	1	(Costa Rican Football Federation) Puntarenas
26	MF	Álvaro Zamora	9 March 2002 (aged 20)	3	0	(Costa Rican Football Federation) Saprissa

=== Germany ===
Coach: Hans-Dieter Flick

Germany announced their final squad on 10 November 2022.

No.	Pos.	Player	Date of birth (age)	Caps	Goals	Club
1	GK	Manuel Neuer (captain)	27 March 1986 (aged 36)	114	0	(German Football Association) Bayern Munich
2	DF	Antonio Rüdiger	3 March 1993 (aged 29)	54	2	(Royal Spanish Football Federation) Real Madrid
3	DF	David Raum	22 April 1998 (aged 24)	12	0	(German Football Association) RB Leipzig
4	DF	Matthias Ginter	19 January 1994 (aged 28)	47	2	(German Football Association) SC Freiburg
5	DF	Thilo Kehrer	21 September 1996 (aged 26)	23	0	(The Football Association) West Ham United
6	MF	Joshua Kimmich	8 February 1995 (aged 27)	71	5	(German Football Association) Bayern Munich
7	FW	Kai Havertz	11 June 1999 (aged 23)	31	10	(The Football Association) Chelsea
8	MF	Leon Goretzka	6 February 1995 (aged 27)	45	14	(German Football Association) Bayern Munich
9	FW	Niclas Füllkrug	9 February 1993 (aged 29)	1	1	(German Football Association) Werder Bremen
10	FW	Serge Gnabry	14 July 1995 (aged 27)	36	20	(German Football Association) Bayern Munich
11	MF	Mario Götze	3 June 1992 (aged 30)	63	17	(German Football Association) Eintracht Frankfurt
12	GK	Kevin Trapp	8 July 1990 (aged 32)	6	0	(German Football Association) Eintracht Frankfurt
13	MF	Thomas Müller	13 September 1989 (aged 33)	118	44	(German Football Association) Bayern Munich
14	MF	Jamal Musiala	26 February 2003 (aged 19)	17	1	(German Football Association) Bayern Munich
15	DF	Niklas Süle	3 September 1995 (aged 27)	42	1	(German Football Association) Borussia Dortmund
16	DF	Lukas Klostermann	3 June 1996 (aged 26)	19	0	(German Football Association) RB Leipzig
17	MF	Julian Brandt	2 May 1996 (aged 26)	39	3	(German Football Association) Borussia Dortmund
18	MF	Jonas Hofmann	14 July 1992 (aged 30)	17	4	(German Football Association) Borussia Mönchengladbach
19	MF	Leroy Sané	11 January 1996 (aged 26)	48	11	(German Football Association) Bayern Munich
20	DF	Christian Günter	28 February 1993 (aged 29)	7	0	(German Football Association) SC Freiburg
21	MF	İlkay Gündoğan	24 October 1990 (aged 32)	63	16	(The Football Association) Manchester City
22	GK	Marc-André ter Stegen	30 April 1992 (aged 30)	30	0	(Royal Spanish Football Federation) Barcelona
23	DF	Nico Schlotterbeck	1 December 1999 (aged 22)	6	0	(German Football Association) Borussia Dortmund
24	FW	Karim Adeyemi	18 January 2002 (aged 20)	4	1	(German Football Association) Borussia Dortmund
25	DF	Armel Bella-Kotchap	11 December 2001 (aged 20)	2	0	(The Football Association) Southampton
26	FW	Youssoufa Moukoko	20 November 2004 (aged 18)	1	0	(German Football Association) Borussia Dortmund

=== Japan ===
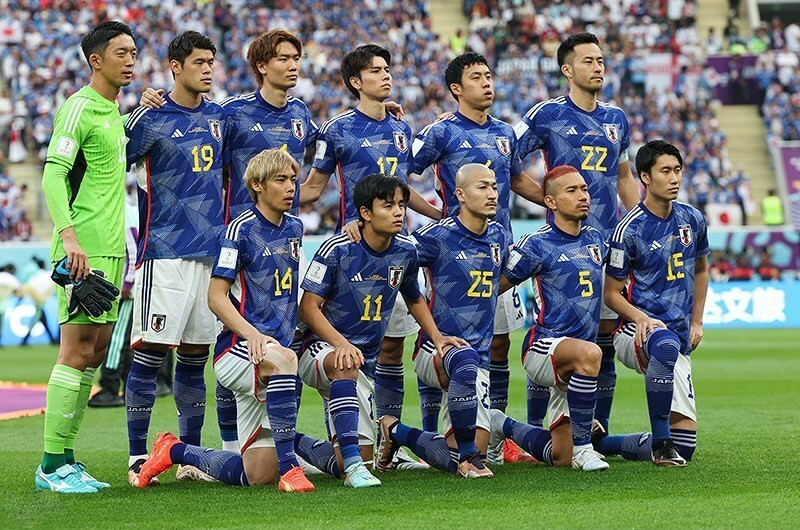
Japan's starting XI for their first group match against Germany

Coach: Hajime Moriyasu

Japan announced their final squad on 1 November 2022. Yūta Nakayama withdrew injured on 3 November and was replaced by Shuto Machino on 8 November.

No.	Pos.	Player	Date of birth (age)	Caps	Goals	Club
1	GK	Eiji Kawashima	20 March 1983 (aged 39)	95	0	(French Football Federation) Strasbourg
2	DF	Miki Yamane	22 December 1993 (aged 28)	15	2	(Japan Football Association) Kawasaki Frontale
3	DF	Shōgo Taniguchi	15 July 1991 (aged 31)	14	0	(Japan Football Association) Kawasaki Frontale
4	DF	Kō Itakura	27 January 1997 (aged 25)	13	1	(German Football Association) Borussia Mönchengladbach
5	DF	Yūto Nagatomo	12 September 1986 (aged 36)	138	4	(Japan Football Association) FC Tokyo
6	MF	Wataru Endo	9 February 1993 (aged 29)	43	2	(German Football Association) VfB Stuttgart
7	MF	Gaku Shibasaki	28 May 1992 (aged 30)	60	3	(Royal Spanish Football Federation) Leganés
8	MF	Ritsu Dōan	16 June 1998 (aged 24)	29	3	(German Football Association) SC Freiburg
9	MF	Kaoru Mitoma	20 May 1997 (aged 25)	9	5	(The Football Association) Brighton & Hove Albion
10	MF	Takumi Minamino	16 January 1995 (aged 27)	44	17	(French Football Federation) Monaco
11	MF	Takefusa Kubo	4 June 2001 (aged 21)	20	1	(Royal Spanish Football Federation) Real Sociedad
12	GK	Shūichi Gonda	3 March 1989 (aged 33)	34	0	(Japan Football Association) Shimizu S-Pulse
13	MF	Hidemasa Morita	10 May 1995 (aged 27)	17	2	(Portuguese Football Federation) Sporting CP
14	MF	Junya Itō	9 March 1993 (aged 29)	38	9	(French Football Federation) Reims
15	MF	Daichi Kamada	5 August 1996 (aged 26)	22	6	(German Football Association) Eintracht Frankfurt
16	DF	Takehiro Tomiyasu	5 November 1998 (aged 24)	29	1	(The Football Association) Arsenal
17	MF	Ao Tanaka	10 September 1998 (aged 24)	15	2	(German Football Association) Fortuna Düsseldorf
18	FW	Takuma Asano	10 November 1994 (aged 28)	37	7	(German Football Association) VfL Bochum
19	DF	Hiroki Sakai	12 April 1990 (aged 32)	72	1	(Japan Football Association) Urawa Red Diamonds
20	FW	Shūto Machino	30 September 1999 (aged 23)	4	3	(Japan Football Association) Shonan Bellmare
21	FW	Ayase Ueda	28 August 1998 (aged 24)	11	0	(Royal Belgian Football Association) Cercle Brugge
22	DF	Maya Yoshida (captain)	24 August 1988 (aged 34)	122	12	(German Football Association) Schalke 04
23	GK	Daniel Schmidt	3 February 1992 (aged 30)	11	0	(Royal Belgian Football Association) Sint-Truiden
24	MF	Yūki Sōma	25 February 1997 (aged 25)	8	4	(Japan Football Association) Nagoya Grampus
25	FW	Daizen Maeda	20 October 1997 (aged 25)	8	1	(Scottish Football Association) Celtic
26	DF	Hiroki Itō	12 May 1999 (aged 23)	6	0	(German Football Association) VfB Stuttgart

=== Spain ===
Coach: Luis Enrique

Spain announced their final squad on 11 November 2022. José Gayà withdrew injured and was replaced by Alejandro Balde on 18 November.

No.	Pos.	Player	Date of birth (age)	Caps	Goals	Club
1	GK	Robert Sánchez	18 November 1997 (aged 25)	2	0	(The Football Association) Brighton & Hove Albion
2	DF	César Azpilicueta	28 August 1989 (aged 33)	42	1	(The Football Association) Chelsea
3	DF	Eric García	9 January 2001 (aged 21)	19	0	(Royal Spanish Football Federation) Barcelona
4	DF	Pau Torres	16 January 1997 (aged 25)	22	1	(Royal Spanish Football Federation) Villarreal
5	MF	Sergio Busquets (captain)	16 July 1988 (aged 34)	139	2	(Royal Spanish Football Federation) Barcelona
6	MF	Marcos Llorente	30 January 1995 (aged 27)	17	0	(Royal Spanish Football Federation) Atlético Madrid
7	FW	Álvaro Morata	23 October 1992 (aged 30)	57	27	(Royal Spanish Football Federation) Atlético Madrid
8	MF	Koke	8 January 1992 (aged 30)	68	0	(Royal Spanish Football Federation) Atlético Madrid
9	MF	Gavi	5 August 2004 (aged 18)	13	2	(Royal Spanish Football Federation) Barcelona
10	FW	Marco Asensio	21 January 1996 (aged 26)	31	1	(Royal Spanish Football Federation) Real Madrid
11	FW	Ferran Torres	29 February 2000 (aged 22)	31	13	(Royal Spanish Football Federation) Barcelona
12	FW	Nico Williams	12 July 2002 (aged 20)	3	1	(Royal Spanish Football Federation) Athletic Bilbao
13	GK	David Raya	15 September 1995 (aged 27)	2	0	(The Football Association) Brentford
14	DF	Alejandro Balde	18 October 2003 (aged 19)	0	0	(Royal Spanish Football Federation) Barcelona
15	DF	Hugo Guillamón	31 January 2000 (aged 22)	3	1	(Royal Spanish Football Federation) Valencia
16	MF	Rodri	22 June 1996 (aged 26)	35	1	(The Football Association) Manchester City
17	FW	Yéremy Pino	20 October 2002 (aged 20)	7	1	(Royal Spanish Football Federation) Villarreal
18	DF	Jordi Alba	21 March 1989 (aged 33)	87	9	(Royal Spanish Football Federation) Barcelona
19	MF	Carlos Soler	2 January 1997 (aged 25)	12	3	(French Football Federation) Paris Saint-Germain
20	DF	Dani Carvajal	11 January 1992 (aged 30)	31	0	(Royal Spanish Football Federation) Real Madrid
21	FW	Dani Olmo	7 May 1998 (aged 24)	25	4	(German Football Association) RB Leipzig
22	FW	Pablo Sarabia	11 May 1992 (aged 30)	25	9	(French Football Federation) Paris Saint-Germain
23	GK	Unai Simón	11 June 1997 (aged 25)	27	0	(Royal Spanish Football Federation) Athletic Bilbao
24	DF	Aymeric Laporte	27 May 1994 (aged 28)	16	1	(The Football Association) Manchester City
25	FW	Ansu Fati	31 October 2002 (aged 20)	5	2	(Royal Spanish Football Federation) Barcelona
26	MF	Pedri	25 November 2002 (aged 19)	14	0	(Royal Spanish Football Federation) Barcelona

== Group F ==
=== Belgium ===
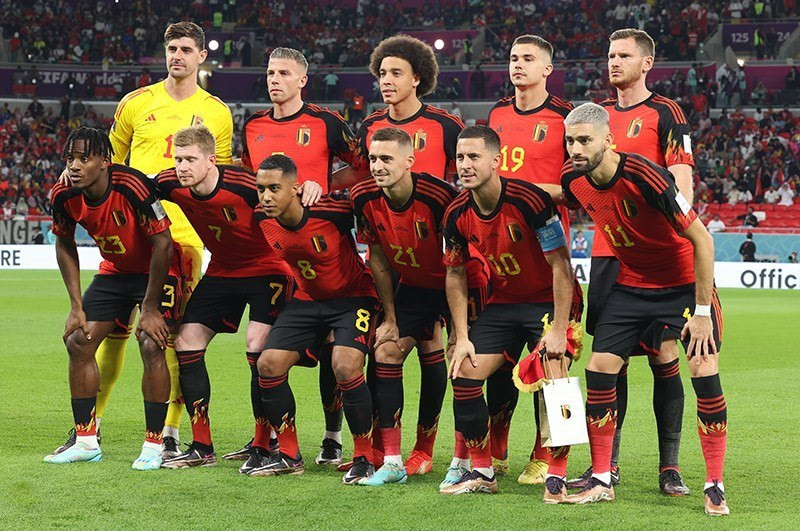
The Belgium starting XI for their first group match

Coach: (Spain) Roberto Martínez

Belgium announced their final squad on 10 November 2022.

No.	Pos.	Player	Date of birth (age)	Caps	Goals	Club
1	GK	Thibaut Courtois	11 May 1992 (aged 30)	97	0	(Royal Spanish Football Federation) Real Madrid
2	DF	Toby Alderweireld	2 March 1989 (aged 33)	124	5	(Royal Belgian Football Association) Antwerp
3	DF	Arthur Theate	25 May 2000 (aged 22)	4	0	(French Football Federation) Rennes
4	DF	Wout Faes	3 April 1998 (aged 24)	1	0	(The Football Association) Leicester City
5	DF	Jan Vertonghen	24 April 1987 (aged 35)	142	9	(Royal Belgian Football Association) Anderlecht
6	MF	Axel Witsel	12 January 1989 (aged 33)	127	12	(Royal Spanish Football Federation) Atlético Madrid
7	MF	Kevin De Bruyne	28 June 1991 (aged 31)	94	25	(The Football Association) Manchester City
8	MF	Youri Tielemans	7 May 1997 (aged 25)	55	5	(The Football Association) Leicester City
9	FW	Romelu Lukaku	13 May 1993 (aged 29)	102	68	(Italian Football Federation) Inter Milan
10	FW	Eden Hazard (captain)	7 January 1991 (aged 31)	123	33	(Royal Spanish Football Federation) Real Madrid
11	FW	Yannick Carrasco	4 September 1993 (aged 29)	60	8	(Royal Spanish Football Federation) Atlético Madrid
12	GK	Simon Mignolet	6 March 1988 (aged 34)	35	0	(Royal Belgian Football Association) Club Brugge
13	GK	Koen Casteels	25 June 1992 (aged 30)	4	0	(German Football Association) VfL Wolfsburg
14	FW	Dries Mertens	6 May 1987 (aged 35)	107	21	(Turkish Football Federation) Galatasaray
15	MF	Thomas Meunier	12 September 1991 (aged 31)	59	8	(German Football Association) Borussia Dortmund
16	MF	Thorgan Hazard	29 March 1993 (aged 29)	45	9	(German Football Association) Borussia Dortmund
17	FW	Leandro Trossard	4 December 1994 (aged 27)	21	5	(The Football Association) Brighton & Hove Albion
18	MF	Amadou Onana	16 August 2001 (aged 21)	2	0	(The Football Association) Everton
19	DF	Leander Dendoncker	15 April 1995 (aged 27)	29	1	(The Football Association) Aston Villa
20	MF	Hans Vanaken	24 August 1992 (aged 30)	23	5	(Royal Belgian Football Association) Club Brugge
21	MF	Timothy Castagne	5 December 1995 (aged 26)	26	2	(The Football Association) Leicester City
22	FW	Charles De Ketelaere	10 March 2001 (aged 21)	10	1	(Italian Football Federation) Milan
23	FW	Michy Batshuayi	2 October 1993 (aged 29)	48	26	(Turkish Football Federation) Fenerbahçe
24	FW	Loïs Openda	16 February 2000 (aged 22)	5	2	(French Football Federation) Lens
25	FW	Jérémy Doku	27 May 2002 (aged 20)	11	2	(French Football Federation) Rennes
26	DF	Zeno Debast	24 October 2003 (aged 19)	3	0	(Royal Belgian Football Association) Anderlecht

=== Canada ===
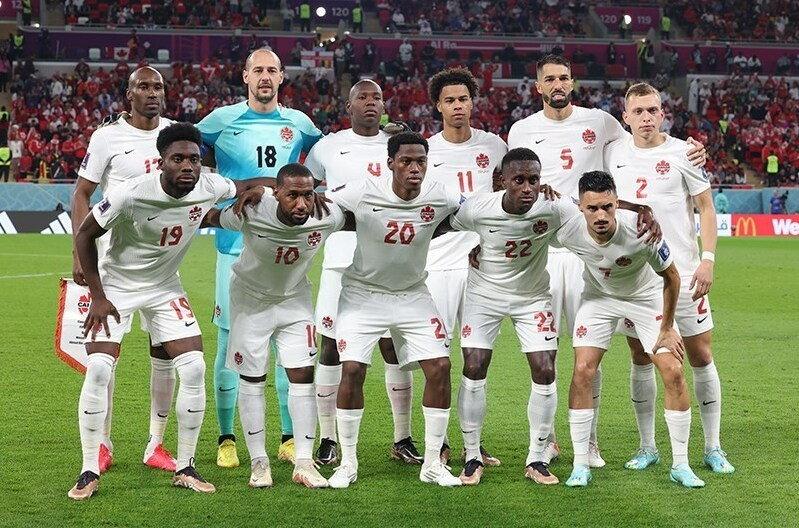
The Canada starting XI for their first group match

Coach: (England) John Herdman

Canada announced their final squad on 13 November 2022.

No.	Pos.	Player	Date of birth (age)	Caps	Goals	Club
1	GK	Dayne St. Clair	9 May 1997 (aged 25)	2	0	(United States Soccer Federation) Minnesota United FC
2	DF	Alistair Johnston	8 October 1998 (aged 24)	30	1	(Canadian Soccer Association) CF Montréal
3	DF	Sam Adekugbe	16 January 1995 (aged 27)	34	1	(Turkish Football Federation) Hatayspor
4	DF	Kamal Miller	16 May 1997 (aged 25)	29	0	(Canadian Soccer Association) CF Montréal
5	DF	Steven Vitória	11 January 1987 (aged 35)	35	4	(Portuguese Football Federation) Chaves
6	MF	Samuel Piette	12 November 1994 (aged 28)	66	0	(Canadian Soccer Association) CF Montréal
7	MF	Stephen Eustáquio	21 December 1996 (aged 25)	26	3	(Portuguese Football Federation) Porto
8	MF	Liam Fraser	13 February 1998 (aged 24)	15	0	(Royal Belgian Football Association) Deinze
9	FW	Lucas Cavallini	28 December 1992 (aged 29)	34	18	(Canadian Soccer Association) Vancouver Whitecaps FC
10	MF	Junior Hoilett	5 June 1990 (aged 32)	50	14	(The Football Association) Reading
11	FW	Tajon Buchanan	8 February 1999 (aged 23)	26	4	(Royal Belgian Football Association) Club Brugge
12	FW	Iké Ugbo	21 September 1998 (aged 24)	8	0	(French Football Federation) Troyes
13	MF	Atiba Hutchinson (captain)	8 February 1983 (aged 39)	98	9	(Turkish Football Federation) Beşiktaş
14	MF	Mark-Anthony Kaye	2 December 1994 (aged 27)	38	2	(Canadian Soccer Association) Toronto FC
15	MF	Ismaël Koné	16 June 2002 (aged 20)	6	1	(Canadian Soccer Association) CF Montréal
16	GK	James Pantemis	21 February 1997 (aged 25)	0	0	(Canadian Soccer Association) CF Montréal
17	FW	Cyle Larin	17 April 1995 (aged 27)	55	25	(Royal Belgian Football Association) Club Brugge
18	GK	Milan Borjan	23 October 1987 (aged 35)	68	0	(Football Association of Serbia) Red Star Belgrade
19	FW	Alphonso Davies	2 November 2000 (aged 22)	34	12	(German Football Association) Bayern Munich
20	FW	Jonathan David	14 January 2000 (aged 22)	35	22	(French Football Federation) Lille
21	MF	Jonathan Osorio	12 June 1992 (aged 30)	57	7	(Canadian Soccer Association) Toronto FC
22	DF	Richie Laryea	7 January 1995 (aged 27)	34	1	(Canadian Soccer Association) Toronto FC
23	MF	Liam Millar	27 September 1999 (aged 23)	16	0	(Swiss Football Association) Basel
24	MF	David Wotherspoon	16 January 1990 (aged 32)	10	1	(Scottish Football Association) St Johnstone
25	DF	Derek Cornelius	25 November 1997 (aged 24)	14	0	(Hellenic Football Federation) Panetolikos
26	DF	Joel Waterman	24 January 1996 (aged 26)	2	0	(Canadian Soccer Association) CF Montréal

=== Croatia ===
Coach: Zlatko Dalić

Croatia announced a 34-man preliminary squad on 31 October 2022. The final squad was announced on 9 November.

No.	Pos.	Player	Date of birth (age)	Caps	Goals	Club
1	GK	Dominik Livaković	9 January 1995 (aged 27)	34	0	(Croatian Football Federation) Dinamo Zagreb
2	DF	Josip Stanišić	2 April 2000 (aged 22)	7	0	(German Football Association) Bayern Munich
3	DF	Borna Barišić	10 November 1992 (aged 30)	28	1	(Scottish Football Association) Rangers
4	FW	Ivan Perišić	2 February 1989 (aged 33)	116	32	(The Football Association) Tottenham Hotspur
5	DF	Martin Erlić	24 January 1998 (aged 24)	4	0	(Italian Football Federation) Sassuolo
6	DF	Dejan Lovren	5 July 1989 (aged 33)	72	5	(Russian Football Union) Zenit Saint Petersburg
7	MF	Lovro Majer	17 January 1998 (aged 24)	11	3	(French Football Federation) Rennes
8	MF	Mateo Kovačić	6 May 1994 (aged 28)	84	3	(The Football Association) Chelsea
9	FW	Andrej Kramarić	19 June 1991 (aged 31)	74	20	(German Football Association) 1899 Hoffenheim
10	MF	Luka Modrić (captain)	9 September 1985 (aged 37)	155	23	(Royal Spanish Football Federation) Real Madrid
11	MF	Marcelo Brozović	16 November 1992 (aged 30)	77	7	(Italian Football Federation) Inter Milan
12	GK	Ivo Grbić	18 January 1996 (aged 26)	2	0	(Royal Spanish Football Federation) Atlético Madrid
13	MF	Nikola Vlašić	4 October 1997 (aged 25)	42	7	(Italian Football Federation) Torino
14	FW	Marko Livaja	26 August 1993 (aged 29)	14	3	(Croatian Football Federation) Hajduk Split
15	MF	Mario Pašalić	9 February 1995 (aged 27)	43	7	(Italian Football Federation) Atalanta
16	FW	Bruno Petković	16 September 1994 (aged 28)	23	6	(Croatian Football Federation) Dinamo Zagreb
17	FW	Ante Budimir	22 July 1991 (aged 31)	15	1	(Royal Spanish Football Federation) Osasuna
18	FW	Mislav Oršić	29 December 1992 (aged 29)	21	1	(Croatian Football Federation) Dinamo Zagreb
19	DF	Borna Sosa	21 January 1998 (aged 24)	8	1	(German Football Association) VfB Stuttgart
20	DF	Joško Gvardiol	23 January 2002 (aged 20)	12	1	(German Football Association) RB Leipzig
21	DF	Domagoj Vida	29 April 1989 (aged 33)	100	4	(Hellenic Football Federation) AEK Athens
22	DF	Josip Juranović	16 August 1995 (aged 27)	21	0	(Scottish Football Association) Celtic
23	GK	Ivica Ivušić	1 February 1995 (aged 27)	5	0	(Croatian Football Federation) Osijek
24	DF	Josip Šutalo	28 February 2000 (aged 22)	3	0	(Croatian Football Federation) Dinamo Zagreb
25	MF	Luka Sučić	8 September 2002 (aged 20)	4	0	(Austrian Football Association) Red Bull Salzburg
26	MF	Kristijan Jakić	14 May 1997 (aged 25)	4	0	(German Football Association) Eintracht Frankfurt

=== Morocco ===
Coach: Walid Regragui

Morocco announced their final squad on 10 November 2022. Amine Harit withdrew injured and was replaced by Anass Zaroury on 16 November.

No.	Pos.	Player	Date of birth (age)	Caps	Goals	Club
1	GK	Yassine Bounou	5 April 1991 (aged 31)	46	0	(Royal Spanish Football Federation) Sevilla
2	DF	Achraf Hakimi	4 November 1998 (aged 24)	54	8	(French Football Federation) Paris Saint-Germain
3	DF	Noussair Mazraoui	14 November 1997 (aged 25)	15	2	(German Football Association) Bayern Munich
4	MF	Sofyan Amrabat	21 August 1996 (aged 26)	39	0	(Italian Football Federation) Fiorentina
5	DF	Nayef Aguerd	30 March 1996 (aged 26)	22	1	(The Football Association) West Ham United
6	DF	Romain Saïss (captain)	26 March 1990 (aged 32)	66	1	(Turkish Football Federation) Beşiktaş
7	MF	Hakim Ziyech	19 March 1993 (aged 29)	43	18	(The Football Association) Chelsea
8	MF	Azzedine Ounahi	19 April 2000 (aged 22)	10	2	(French Football Federation) Angers
9	FW	Abderrazak Hamdallah	17 December 1990 (aged 31)	18	6	(Saudi Arabian Football Federation) Al-Ittihad
10	MF	Anass Zaroury	7 November 2000 (aged 22)	1	0	(The Football Association) Burnley
11	FW	Abdelhamid Sabiri	28 November 1996 (aged 25)	2	1	(Italian Football Federation) Sampdoria
12	GK	Munir Mohamedi	10 May 1989 (aged 33)	43	0	(Saudi Arabian Football Federation) Al-Wehda
13	MF	Ilias Chair	30 October 1997 (aged 25)	11	1	(The Football Association) Queens Park Rangers
14	MF	Zakaria Aboukhlal	18 February 2000 (aged 22)	12	2	(French Football Federation) Toulouse
15	MF	Selim Amallah	15 November 1996 (aged 26)	24	4	(Royal Belgian Football Association) Standard Liège
16	FW	Abde Ezzalzouli	17 December 2001 (aged 20)	2	0	(Royal Spanish Football Federation) Osasuna
17	MF	Sofiane Boufal	17 September 1993 (aged 29)	32	6	(French Football Federation) Angers
18	DF	Jawad El Yamiq	29 February 1992 (aged 30)	12	2	(Royal Spanish Football Federation) Valladolid
19	FW	Youssef En-Nesyri	1 June 1997 (aged 25)	50	15	(Royal Spanish Football Federation) Sevilla
20	DF	Achraf Dari	6 May 1999 (aged 23)	4	0	(French Football Federation) Brest
21	FW	Walid Cheddira	22 January 1998 (aged 24)	2	0	(Italian Football Federation) Bari
22	GK	Ahmed Reda Tagnaouti	5 April 1996 (aged 26)	3	0	(Royal Moroccan Football Federation) Wydad AC
23	MF	Bilal El Khannous	10 May 2004 (aged 18)	0	0	(Royal Belgian Football Association) Genk
24	DF	Badr Benoun	30 September 1993 (aged 29)	3	0	(Qatar Football Association) Qatar SC
25	DF	Yahia Attiyat Allah	2 March 1995 (aged 27)	2	0	(Royal Moroccan Football Federation) Wydad AC
26	MF	Yahya Jabrane	18 June 1991 (aged 31)	5	0	(Royal Moroccan Football Federation) Wydad AC

== Group G ==
=== Brazil ===
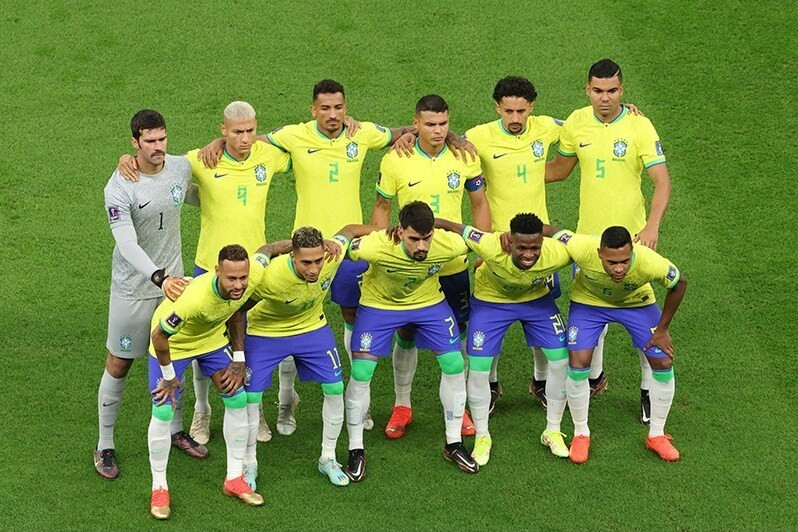
The Brazil starting XI for their first group match

Coach: Tite

Brazil announced their final squad on 7 November 2022.

No.	Pos.	Player	Date of birth (age)	Caps	Goals	Club
1	GK	Alisson	2 October 1992 (aged 30)	57	0	(The Football Association) Liverpool
2	DF	Danilo	15 July 1991 (aged 31)	46	1	(Italian Football Federation) Juventus
3	DF	Thiago Silva (captain)	22 September 1984 (aged 38)	109	7	(The Football Association) Chelsea
4	DF	Marquinhos	14 May 1994 (aged 28)	71	5	(French Football Federation) Paris Saint-Germain
5	MF	Casemiro	23 February 1992 (aged 30)	65	5	(The Football Association) Manchester United
6	DF	Alex Sandro	26 January 1991 (aged 31)	37	2	(Italian Football Federation) Juventus
7	MF	Lucas Paquetá	27 August 1997 (aged 25)	35	7	(The Football Association) West Ham United
8	MF	Fred	5 March 1993 (aged 29)	28	0	(The Football Association) Manchester United
9	FW	Richarlison	10 May 1997 (aged 25)	38	17	(The Football Association) Tottenham Hotspur
10	FW	Neymar	5 February 1992 (aged 30)	121	75	(French Football Federation) Paris Saint-Germain
11	FW	Raphinha	14 December 1996 (aged 25)	11	5	(Royal Spanish Football Federation) Barcelona
12	GK	Weverton	13 December 1987 (aged 34)	8	0	(Brazilian Football Confederation) Palmeiras
13	DF	Dani Alves	6 May 1983 (aged 39)	124	8	(Mexican Football Federation) UNAM
14	DF	Éder Militão	18 January 1998 (aged 24)	23	1	(Royal Spanish Football Federation) Real Madrid
15	MF	Fabinho	23 October 1993 (aged 29)	28	0	(The Football Association) Liverpool
16	DF	Alex Telles	15 December 1992 (aged 29)	8	0	(Royal Spanish Football Federation) Sevilla
17	MF	Bruno Guimarães	16 November 1997 (aged 25)	8	1	(The Football Association) Newcastle United
18	FW	Gabriel Jesus	3 April 1997 (aged 25)	56	19	(The Football Association) Arsenal
19	FW	Antony	24 February 2000 (aged 22)	11	2	(The Football Association) Manchester United
20	FW	Vinícius Júnior	12 July 2000 (aged 22)	16	1	(Royal Spanish Football Federation) Real Madrid
21	FW	Rodrygo	9 January 2001 (aged 21)	7	1	(Royal Spanish Football Federation) Real Madrid
22	MF	Éverton Ribeiro	10 April 1989 (aged 33)	21	3	(Brazilian Football Confederation) Flamengo
23	GK	Ederson	17 August 1993 (aged 29)	18	0	(The Football Association) Manchester City
24	DF	Bremer	18 March 1997 (aged 25)	1	0	(Italian Football Federation) Juventus
25	FW	Pedro	20 June 1997 (aged 25)	2	1	(Brazilian Football Confederation) Flamengo
26	FW	Gabriel Martinelli	18 June 2001 (aged 21)	3	0	(The Football Association) Arsenal

=== Cameroon ===
Coach: Rigobert Song

Cameroon announced their final squad on 9 November 2022. André Onana left the squad on 28 November.

No.	Pos.	Player	Date of birth (age)	Caps	Goals	Club
1	GK	Simon Ngapandouetnbu	12 April 2003 (aged 19)	0	0	(French Football Federation) Marseille
2	DF	Jerome Ngom Mbekeli	30 September 1998 (aged 24)	2	0	(Cameroonian Football Federation) Colombe Sportive
3	DF	Nicolas Nkoulou	27 March 1990 (aged 32)	79	2	(Hellenic Football Federation) Aris
4	DF	Christopher Wooh	18 September 2001 (aged 21)	4	0	(French Football Federation) Rennes
5	MF	Gaël Ondoua	4 November 1995 (aged 27)	4	0	(German Football Association) Hannover 96
6	FW	Moumi Ngamaleu	9 July 1994 (aged 28)	42	4	(Russian Football Union) Dynamo Moscow
7	MF	Georges-Kévin Nkoudou	13 February 1995 (aged 27)	3	0	(Turkish Football Federation) Beşiktaş
8	MF	André-Frank Zambo Anguissa	16 November 1995 (aged 27)	44	5	(Italian Football Federation) Napoli
9	FW	Jean-Pierre Nsame	1 May 1993 (aged 29)	4	0	(Swiss Football Association) Young Boys
10	FW	Vincent Aboubakar (captain)	22 January 1992 (aged 30)	92	33	(Saudi Arabian Football Federation) Al-Nassr
11	FW	Christian Bassogog	18 October 1995 (aged 27)	44	7	(Chinese Football Association) Shanghai Shenhua
12	FW	Karl Toko Ekambi	14 September 1992 (aged 30)	52	12	(French Football Federation) Lyon
13	FW	Eric Maxim Choupo-Moting	23 March 1989 (aged 33)	70	20	(German Football Association) Bayern Munich
14	MF	Samuel Gouet	14 December 1997 (aged 24)	22	0	(Royal Belgian Football Association) Mechelen
15	MF	Pierre Kunde	26 July 1995 (aged 27)	33	1	(Hellenic Football Federation) Olympiacos
16	GK	Devis Epassy	2 February 1993 (aged 29)	5	0	(Saudi Arabian Football Federation) Abha
17	DF	Olivier Mbaizo	15 August 1997 (aged 25)	11	0	(United States Soccer Federation) Philadelphia Union
18	MF	Martin Hongla	16 March 1998 (aged 24)	20	0	(Italian Football Federation) Hellas Verona
19	DF	Collins Fai	13 August 1992 (aged 30)	53	0	(Saudi Arabian Football Federation) Al-Tai
20	FW	Bryan Mbeumo	7 August 1999 (aged 23)	4	0	(The Football Association) Brentford
21	DF	Jean-Charles Castelletto	26 January 1995 (aged 27)	15	0	(French Football Federation) Nantes
22	MF	Olivier Ntcham	9 February 1996 (aged 26)	4	0	(Football Association of Wales) Swansea City
23	GK	André Onana	2 April 1996 (aged 26)	34	0	(Italian Football Federation) Inter Milan
24	DF	Enzo Ebosse	11 March 1999 (aged 23)	3	0	(Italian Football Federation) Udinese
25	DF	Nouhou Tolo	23 June 1997 (aged 25)	19	0	(United States Soccer Federation) Seattle Sounders FC
26	MF	Souaibou Marou	3 December 2000 (aged 21)	3	1	(Cameroonian Football Federation) Coton Sport

=== Serbia ===
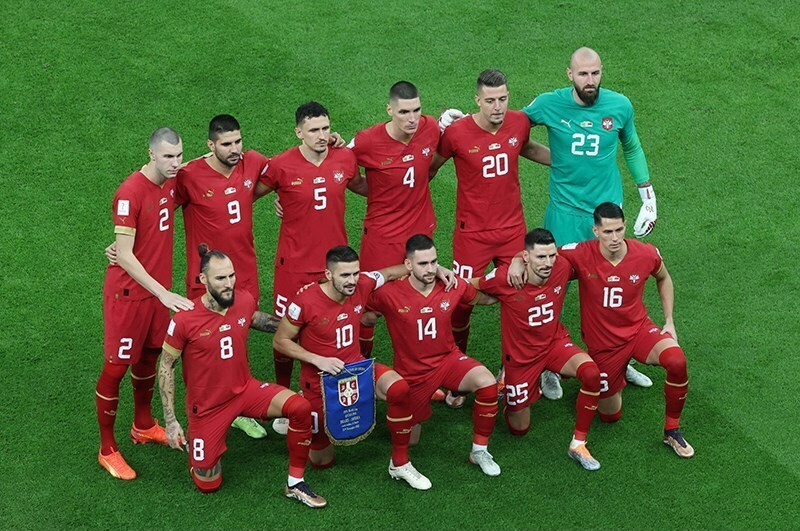
The Serbia starting XI for their first group match

Coach: Dragan Stojković

Serbia announced their final squad on 11 November 2022.

No.	Pos.	Player	Date of birth (age)	Caps	Goals	Club
1	GK	Marko Dmitrović	24 January 1992 (aged 30)	19	0	(Royal Spanish Football Federation) Sevilla
2	DF	Strahinja Pavlović	24 May 2001 (aged 21)	22	1	(Austrian Football Association) Red Bull Salzburg
3	DF	Strahinja Eraković	22 January 2001 (aged 21)	2	0	(Football Association of Serbia) Red Star Belgrade
4	DF	Nikola Milenković	12 October 1997 (aged 25)	39	3	(Italian Football Federation) Fiorentina
5	DF	Miloš Veljković	26 September 1995 (aged 27)	21	0	(German Football Association) Werder Bremen
6	MF	Nemanja Maksimović	26 January 1995 (aged 27)	40	0	(Royal Spanish Football Federation) Getafe
7	FW	Nemanja Radonjić	15 February 1996 (aged 26)	36	5	(Italian Football Federation) Torino
8	MF	Nemanja Gudelj	16 November 1991 (aged 31)	49	1	(Royal Spanish Football Federation) Sevilla
9	FW	Aleksandar Mitrović	16 September 1994 (aged 28)	76	50	(The Football Association) Fulham
10	FW	Dušan Tadić (captain)	20 November 1988 (aged 34)	91	20	(Royal Dutch Football Association) Ajax
11	FW	Luka Jović	23 December 1997 (aged 24)	29	10	(Italian Football Federation) Fiorentina
12	GK	Predrag Rajković	31 October 1995 (aged 27)	28	0	(Royal Spanish Football Federation) Mallorca
13	DF	Stefan Mitrović	22 May 1990 (aged 32)	35	0	(Royal Spanish Football Federation) Getafe
14	MF	Andrija Živković	11 July 1996 (aged 26)	29	1	(Hellenic Football Federation) PAOK
15	DF	Srđan Babić	22 April 1996 (aged 26)	2	0	(Royal Spanish Football Federation) Almería
16	MF	Saša Lukić	13 August 1996 (aged 26)	32	2	(Italian Football Federation) Torino
17	MF	Filip Kostić	1 November 1992 (aged 30)	50	3	(Italian Football Federation) Juventus
18	FW	Dušan Vlahović	28 January 2000 (aged 22)	17	9	(Italian Football Federation) Juventus
19	MF	Uroš Račić	17 March 1998 (aged 24)	9	0	(Portuguese Football Federation) Braga
20	MF	Sergej Milinković-Savić	27 February 1995 (aged 27)	36	6	(Italian Football Federation) Lazio
21	FW	Filip Đuričić	30 January 1992 (aged 30)	37	5	(Italian Football Federation) Sampdoria
22	MF	Darko Lazović	15 September 1990 (aged 32)	26	1	(Italian Football Federation) Hellas Verona
23	GK	Vanja Milinković-Savić	20 February 1997 (aged 25)	7	0	(Italian Football Federation) Torino
24	MF	Ivan Ilić	17 March 2001 (aged 21)	6	0	(Italian Football Federation) Hellas Verona
25	DF	Filip Mladenović	15 August 1991 (aged 31)	20	1	(Polish Football Association) Legia Warsaw
26	MF	Marko Grujić	13 April 1996 (aged 26)	18	0	(Portuguese Football Federation) Porto

=== Switzerland ===
Coach: Murat Yakin

Switzerland announced their final squad on 9 November 2022.

No.	Pos.	Player	Date of birth (age)	Caps	Goals	Club
1	GK	Yann Sommer	17 December 1988 (aged 33)	77	0	(German Football Association) Borussia Mönchengladbach
2	DF	Edimilson Fernandes	15 April 1996 (aged 26)	22	2	(German Football Association) Mainz 05
3	DF	Silvan Widmer	5 March 1993 (aged 29)	34	2	(German Football Association) Mainz 05
4	DF	Nico Elvedi	30 September 1996 (aged 26)	41	1	(German Football Association) Borussia Mönchengladbach
5	DF	Manuel Akanji	19 July 1995 (aged 27)	43	1	(The Football Association) Manchester City
6	MF	Denis Zakaria	20 November 1996 (aged 26)	43	3	(The Football Association) Chelsea
7	FW	Breel Embolo	14 February 1997 (aged 25)	59	11	(French Football Federation) Monaco
8	MF	Remo Freuler	15 April 1992 (aged 30)	49	5	(The Football Association) Nottingham Forest
9	FW	Haris Seferovic	22 February 1992 (aged 30)	89	25	(Turkish Football Federation) Galatasaray
10	MF	Granit Xhaka (captain)	27 September 1992 (aged 30)	107	12	(The Football Association) Arsenal
11	DF	Renato Steffen	3 November 1991 (aged 31)	28	1	(Swiss Football Association) Lugano
12	GK	Jonas Omlin	10 January 1994 (aged 28)	4	0	(French Football Federation) Montpellier
13	DF	Ricardo Rodriguez	25 August 1992 (aged 30)	100	9	(Italian Football Federation) Torino
14	MF	Michel Aebischer	6 January 1997 (aged 25)	12	0	(Italian Football Federation) Bologna
15	MF	Djibril Sow	6 February 1997 (aged 25)	32	0	(German Football Association) Eintracht Frankfurt
16	MF	Christian Fassnacht	11 November 1993 (aged 29)	16	4	(Swiss Football Association) Young Boys
17	FW	Rubén Vargas	5 August 1998 (aged 24)	27	4	(German Football Association) FC Augsburg
18	DF	Eray Cömert	4 February 1998 (aged 24)	10	0	(Royal Spanish Football Federation) Valencia
19	FW	Noah Okafor	24 May 2000 (aged 22)	9	2	(Austrian Football Association) Red Bull Salzburg
20	MF	Fabian Frei	8 January 1989 (aged 33)	22	3	(Swiss Football Association) Basel
21	GK	Gregor Kobel	6 December 1997 (aged 24)	3	0	(German Football Association) Borussia Dortmund
22	DF	Fabian Schär	20 December 1991 (aged 30)	73	8	(The Football Association) Newcastle United
23	MF	Xherdan Shaqiri	10 October 1991 (aged 31)	109	26	(United States Soccer Federation) Chicago Fire FC
24	GK	Philipp Köhn	2 April 1998 (aged 24)	0	0	(Austrian Football Association) Red Bull Salzburg
25	MF	Fabian Rieder	16 February 2002 (aged 20)	0	0	(Swiss Football Association) Young Boys
26	MF	Ardon Jashari	30 July 2002 (aged 20)	1	0	(Swiss Football Association) Luzern

== Group H ==
=== Ghana ===
Coach: Otto Addo

Ghana announced a 55-man preliminary squad on 4 November 2022. The final squad was announced on 14 November.

No.	Pos.	Player	Date of birth (age)	Caps	Goals	Club
1	GK	Lawrence Ati-Zigi	29 November 1996 (aged 25)	11	0	(Swiss Football Association) St. Gallen
2	DF	Tariq Lamptey	30 September 2000 (aged 22)	2	0	(The Football Association) Brighton & Hove Albion
3	DF	Denis Odoi	27 May 1988 (aged 34)	4	0	(Royal Belgian Football Association) Club Brugge
4	DF	Mohammed Salisu	17 April 1999 (aged 23)	3	1	(The Football Association) Southampton
5	MF	Thomas Partey	13 June 1993 (aged 29)	40	13	(The Football Association) Arsenal
6	MF	Elisha Owusu	7 November 1997 (aged 25)	3	0	(Royal Belgian Football Association) Gent
7	MF	Abdul Fatawu Issahaku	8 March 2004 (aged 18)	13	1	(Portuguese Football Federation) Sporting CP
8	MF	Daniel-Kofi Kyereh	8 March 1996 (aged 26)	15	0	(German Football Association) SC Freiburg
9	FW	Jordan Ayew	11 September 1991 (aged 31)	84	19	(The Football Association) Crystal Palace
10	FW	André Ayew (captain)	17 December 1989 (aged 32)	110	23	(Qatar Football Association) Al-Sadd
11	MF	Osman Bukari	13 December 1998 (aged 23)	7	1	(Football Association of Serbia) Red Star Belgrade
12	GK	Ibrahim Danlad	2 December 2002 (aged 19)	4	0	(Ghana Football Association) Asante Kotoko
13	MF	Daniel Afriyie	26 June 2001 (aged 21)	7	3	(Ghana Football Association) Hearts of Oak
14	DF	Gideon Mensah	18 July 1998 (aged 24)	12	0	(French Football Federation) Auxerre
15	DF	Joseph Aidoo	29 September 1995 (aged 27)	11	0	(Royal Spanish Football Federation) Celta Vigo
16	GK	Abdul Manaf Nurudeen	8 February 1999 (aged 23)	2	0	(Royal Belgian Football Association) Eupen
17	DF	Baba Rahman	2 July 1994 (aged 28)	48	1	(The Football Association) Reading
18	DF	Daniel Amartey	21 December 1994 (aged 27)	46	0	(The Football Association) Leicester City
19	FW	Iñaki Williams	15 June 1994 (aged 28)	3	0	(Royal Spanish Football Federation) Athletic Bilbao
20	MF	Mohammed Kudus	2 August 2000 (aged 22)	18	5	(Royal Dutch Football Association) Ajax
21	MF	Salis Abdul Samed	26 March 2000 (aged 22)	1	0	(French Football Federation) Lens
22	MF	Kamaldeen Sulemana	15 February 2002 (aged 20)	13	0	(French Football Federation) Rennes
23	DF	Alexander Djiku	9 August 1994 (aged 28)	18	1	(French Football Federation) Strasbourg
24	MF	Kamal Sowah	9 January 2000 (aged 22)	1	0	(Royal Belgian Football Association) Club Brugge
25	FW	Antoine Semenyo	7 January 2000 (aged 22)	4	1	(The Football Association) Bristol City
26	DF	Alidu Seidu	4 June 2000 (aged 22)	4	0	(French Football Federation) Clermont

=== Portugal ===
Coach: Fernando Santos

Portugal announced their final squad on 10 November 2022.

No.	Pos.	Player	Date of birth (age)	Caps	Goals	Club
1	GK	Rui Patrício	15 February 1988 (aged 34)	105	0	(Italian Football Federation) Roma
2	DF	Diogo Dalot	18 March 1999 (aged 23)	7	2	(The Football Association) Manchester United
3	DF	Pepe	26 February 1983 (aged 39)	129	7	(Portuguese Football Federation) Porto
4	DF	Rúben Dias	14 May 1997 (aged 25)	40	2	(The Football Association) Manchester City
5	DF	Raphaël Guerreiro	22 December 1993 (aged 28)	57	3	(German Football Association) Borussia Dortmund
6	MF	João Palhinha	9 July 1995 (aged 27)	15	2	(The Football Association) Fulham
7	FW	Cristiano Ronaldo (captain)	5 February 1985 (aged 37)	191	117	(The Football Association) Manchester United
8	MF	Bruno Fernandes	8 September 1994 (aged 28)	49	11	(The Football Association) Manchester United
9	FW	André Silva	6 November 1995 (aged 27)	52	19	(German Football Association) RB Leipzig
10	FW	Bernardo Silva	10 August 1994 (aged 28)	73	8	(The Football Association) Manchester City
11	FW	João Félix	10 November 1999 (aged 23)	24	3	(Royal Spanish Football Federation) Atlético Madrid
12	GK	José Sá	17 January 1993 (aged 29)	0	0	(The Football Association) Wolverhampton Wanderers
13	DF	Danilo Pereira	9 September 1991 (aged 31)	63	2	(French Football Federation) Paris Saint-Germain
14	MF	William Carvalho	7 April 1992 (aged 30)	76	5	(Royal Spanish Football Federation) Real Betis
15	FW	Rafael Leão	10 June 1999 (aged 23)	11	0	(Italian Football Federation) Milan
16	MF	Vitinha	13 February 2000 (aged 22)	5	0	(French Football Federation) Paris Saint-Germain
17	MF	João Mário	19 January 1993 (aged 29)	53	3	(Portuguese Football Federation) Benfica
18	MF	Rúben Neves	13 March 1997 (aged 25)	32	0	(The Football Association) Wolverhampton Wanderers
19	DF	Nuno Mendes	19 June 2002 (aged 20)	17	0	(French Football Federation) Paris Saint-Germain
20	DF	João Cancelo	27 May 1994 (aged 28)	37	7	(The Football Association) Manchester City
21	FW	Ricardo Horta	15 September 1994 (aged 28)	6	1	(Portuguese Football Federation) Braga
22	GK	Diogo Costa	19 September 1999 (aged 23)	7	0	(Portuguese Football Federation) Porto
23	MF	Matheus Nunes	27 August 1998 (aged 24)	9	1	(The Football Association) Wolverhampton Wanderers
24	DF	António Silva	30 October 2003 (aged 19)	1	0	(Portuguese Football Federation) Benfica
25	MF	Otávio	9 February 1995 (aged 27)	8	2	(Portuguese Football Federation) Porto
26	FW	Gonçalo Ramos	20 June 2001 (aged 21)	1	1	(Portuguese Football Federation) Benfica

=== South Korea ===
Coach: (Portugal) Paulo Bento

South Korea announced their final squad on 12 November 2022.

No.	Pos.	Player	Date of birth (age)	Caps	Goals	Club
1	GK	Kim Seung-gyu	30 September 1990 (aged 32)	67	0	(Saudi Arabian Football Federation) Al-Shabab
2	DF	Yoon Jong-gyu	20 March 1998 (aged 24)	4	0	(Korea Football Association) FC Seoul
3	DF	Kim Jin-su	13 June 1992 (aged 30)	61	2	(Korea Football Association) Jeonbuk Hyundai Motors
4	DF	Kim Min-jae	15 November 1996 (aged 26)	44	3	(Italian Football Federation) Napoli
5	MF	Jung Woo-young	14 December 1989 (aged 32)	66	3	(Qatar Football Association) Al-Sadd
6	MF	Hwang In-beom	20 September 1996 (aged 26)	37	4	(Hellenic Football Federation) Olympiacos
7	FW	Son Heung-min (captain)	8 July 1992 (aged 30)	104	35	(The Football Association) Tottenham Hotspur
8	MF	Paik Seung-ho	17 March 1997 (aged 25)	14	2	(Korea Football Association) Jeonbuk Hyundai Motors
9	FW	Cho Gue-sung	25 January 1998 (aged 24)	16	4	(Korea Football Association) Jeonbuk Hyundai Motors
10	MF	Lee Jae-sung	10 August 1992 (aged 30)	64	9	(German Football Association) Mainz 05
11	MF	Hwang Hee-chan	26 January 1996 (aged 26)	49	9	(The Football Association) Wolverhampton Wanderers
12	GK	Song Bum-keun	15 October 1997 (aged 25)	1	0	(Korea Football Association) Jeonbuk Hyundai Motors
13	MF	Son Jun-ho	12 May 1992 (aged 30)	15	0	(Chinese Football Association) Shandong Taishan
14	DF	Hong Chul	17 September 1990 (aged 32)	46	1	(Korea Football Association) Daegu FC
15	DF	Kim Moon-hwan	1 August 1995 (aged 27)	22	0	(Korea Football Association) Jeonbuk Hyundai Motors
16	FW	Hwang Ui-jo	28 August 1992 (aged 30)	49	16	(Hellenic Football Federation) Olympiacos
17	MF	Na Sang-ho	12 August 1996 (aged 26)	24	2	(Korea Football Association) FC Seoul
18	MF	Lee Kang-in	19 February 2001 (aged 21)	6	0	(Royal Spanish Football Federation) Mallorca
19	DF	Kim Young-gwon	27 February 1990 (aged 32)	96	6	(Korea Football Association) Ulsan Hyundai
20	DF	Kwon Kyung-won	31 January 1992 (aged 30)	28	2	(Japan Football Association) Gamba Osaka
21	GK	Jo Hyeon-woo	25 September 1991 (aged 31)	22	0	(Korea Football Association) Ulsan Hyundai
22	MF	Kwon Chang-hoon	30 June 1994 (aged 28)	42	12	(Korea Football Association) Gimcheon Sangmu
23	DF	Kim Tae-hwan	24 July 1989 (aged 33)	19	0	(Korea Football Association) Ulsan Hyundai
24	DF	Cho Yu-min	17 November 1996 (aged 26)	4	0	(Korea Football Association) Daejeon Hana Citizen
25	MF	Jeong Woo-yeong	20 September 1999 (aged 23)	9	2	(German Football Association) SC Freiburg
26	MF	Song Min-kyu	12 September 1999 (aged 23)	13	1	(Korea Football Association) Jeonbuk Hyundai Motors

=== Uruguay ===
Coach: Diego Alonso

Uruguay announced a 55-man preliminary squad on 21 October 2022. The final squad was announced on 10 November.

No.	Pos.	Player	Date of birth (age)	Caps	Goals	Club
1	GK	Fernando Muslera	16 June 1986 (aged 36)	133	0	(Turkish Football Federation) Galatasaray
2	DF	José Giménez	20 January 1995 (aged 27)	78	8	(Royal Spanish Football Federation) Atlético Madrid
3	DF	Diego Godín (captain)	16 February 1986 (aged 36)	159	8	(Argentine Football Association) Vélez Sarsfield
4	DF	Ronald Araújo	7 March 1999 (aged 23)	12	0	(Royal Spanish Football Federation) Barcelona
5	MF	Matías Vecino	24 August 1991 (aged 31)	62	4	(Italian Football Federation) Lazio
6	MF	Rodrigo Bentancur	25 June 1997 (aged 25)	51	1	(The Football Association) Tottenham Hotspur
7	MF	Nicolás de la Cruz	1 June 1997 (aged 25)	17	2	(Argentine Football Association) River Plate
8	FW	Facundo Pellistri	20 December 2001 (aged 20)	7	0	(The Football Association) Manchester United
9	FW	Luis Suárez	24 January 1987 (aged 35)	134	68	(Uruguayan Football Association) Nacional
10	MF	Giorgian de Arrascaeta	1 June 1994 (aged 28)	40	8	(Brazilian Football Confederation) Flamengo
11	FW	Darwin Núñez	24 June 1999 (aged 23)	13	3	(The Football Association) Liverpool
12	GK	Sebastián Sosa	19 August 1986 (aged 36)	1	0	(Argentine Football Association) Independiente
13	DF	Guillermo Varela	24 March 1993 (aged 29)	9	0	(Brazilian Football Confederation) Flamengo
14	MF	Lucas Torreira	11 February 1996 (aged 26)	40	0	(Turkish Football Federation) Galatasaray
15	MF	Federico Valverde	22 July 1998 (aged 24)	44	4	(Royal Spanish Football Federation) Real Madrid
16	DF	Mathías Olivera	31 October 1997 (aged 25)	8	0	(Italian Football Federation) Napoli
17	DF	Matías Viña	9 November 1997 (aged 25)	26	0	(Italian Football Federation) Roma
18	FW	Maxi Gómez	14 August 1996 (aged 26)	27	4	(Turkish Football Federation) Trabzonspor
19	DF	Sebastián Coates	7 October 1990 (aged 32)	47	1	(Portuguese Football Federation) Sporting CP
20	FW	Facundo Torres	13 April 2000 (aged 22)	10	0	(United States Soccer Federation) Orlando City SC
21	FW	Edinson Cavani	14 February 1987 (aged 35)	133	58	(Royal Spanish Football Federation) Valencia
22	DF	Martín Cáceres	7 April 1987 (aged 35)	115	4	(United States Soccer Federation) LA Galaxy
23	GK	Sergio Rochet	23 March 1993 (aged 29)	8	0	(Uruguayan Football Association) Nacional
24	MF	Agustín Canobbio	1 October 1998 (aged 24)	3	0	(Brazilian Football Confederation) Athletico Paranaense
25	MF	Manuel Ugarte	11 April 2001 (aged 21)	6	0	(Portuguese Football Federation) Sporting CP
26	DF	José Luis Rodríguez	14 March 1997 (aged 25)	0	0	(Uruguayan Football Association) Nacional

== Statistics ==
Note: Only the final squad list of each national team is taken into consideration.

=== Players ===
==== Outfield players ====
- Oldest: (Canada) Atiba Hutchinson (39 years, 285 days)
- Youngest: (Germany) Youssoufa Moukoko (18 years, 0 days)

==== Goalkeepers ====
- Oldest: (Mexico) Alfredo Talavera (40 years, 63 days)
- Youngest: (Cameroon) Simon Ngapandouetnbu (19 years, 222 days)

==== Captains ====
- Oldest: (Canada) Atiba Hutchinson (39 years, 285 days)
- Youngest: (United States) Tyler Adams (23 years, 279 days)

==== Coaches ====
- Oldest: Louis van Gaal (Netherlands, 71 years, 104 days)
- Youngest: Lionel Scaloni (Argentina, 44 years, 188 days)

=== Player representation by league system ===
Nations in bold are represented at the tournament.

Country	Players	Percent	Outside national squad	Lower tier players
**England** (Note: Includes players from Cardiff City and Swansea City, which are based in Wales but play in the English league system.)	164	19.74%	139	30
**Spain**	87	10.35%	69	3
**Germany**	80	9.63%	60	3
Italy	68	8.18%	68	3
**France** (Note: Includes players from Monaco, which is based in Monaco but plays in the French league system. Monaco is not a FIFA member.)	57	6.86%	51	2
**United States** (Note: Includes players from CF Montréal, Toronto FC and Vancouver Whitecaps FC, which are based in Canada but play in the American league system.)	36	4.33%	27	0
**Saudi Arabia**	35	4.21%	9	2
**Qatar**	33	3.97%	7	0
**Belgium**	25	3.01%	20	1
**Mexico**	23	2.77%	7	0
**Netherlands**	19	2.29%	7	0
**Portugal**	19	2.29%	12	0
Turkey	19	2.29%	19	0
**Costa Rica**	17	2.05%	0	0
**South Korea**	14	1.68%	0	1
Greece	13	1.56%	13	0
Scotland	12	1.44%	12	0
**Japan**	10	1.20%	3	2
**Iran**	9	1.08%	0	0
**Switzerland**	9	1.08%	4	0
**Australia**	8	0.96%	0	0
**Denmark**	8	0.96%	6	1
**Tunisia**	8	0.96%	0	0
**Brazil**	7	0.84%	4	0
**Croatia**	7	0.84%	1	0
**Argentina**	6	0.72%	5	0
Austria	4	0.48%	4	0
**Poland**	4	0.48%	1	0
**Ecuador**	4	0.48%	0	1
**Morocco**	3	0.36%	0	0
**Serbia**	3	0.36%	2	0
**Uruguay**	3	0.36%	0	0
**Cameroon**	2	0.24%	0	0
China	2	0.24%	2	0
Cyprus	2	0.24%	2	0
Egypt	2	0.24%	2	0
**Ghana**	2	0.24%	0	0
Kuwait	2	0.24%	2	0
Russia	2	0.24%	2	0
Colombia	1	0.12%	1	0
Hungary	1	0.12%	1	0
United Arab Emirates	1	0.12%	1	0
**Total**	**831**	**100%**	**564 (67.87%)**	**49 (5.90%)**

- The Qatar (hosts) and Saudi Arabia squads were made up entirely of players from the countries' domestic leagues.
- The Senegal squad was the only squad not to include any players employed by clubs in their home country.
- The Canada and Wales squads both included players employed by domestic clubs, but no players employed in the Canadian or Welsh domestic league systems. All Canadian domestic players played for Canadian teams in the American Major League Soccer; all Welsh domestic players played for Welsh teams in the English EFL Championship.
- Two squads had only one domestic-based player (Argentina and Serbia).
- The Brazil squad had the most players from a single foreign federation, with 12 players employed in England.
- Of the countries not represented by a national team at the World Cup, Italy's league provided the most squad members, with 70.
- The second-tier English Championship had 29 players selected, though none for England.
- The lowest league on a domestic pyramid to be represented at the World Cup was EFL League Two, the English fourth tier. It was represented by Welsh players Chris Gunter (AFC Wimbledon) and Jonny Williams (Swindon Town).

=== Player representation by club ===
Players	Clubs
17	(Spain) Barcelona
16	(Germany) Bayern Munich (England) Manchester City
15	(Qatar) Al-Sadd
14	(England) Manchester United
13	(Spain) Real Madrid
12	(Saudi Arabia) Al Hilal (Spain) Atlético Madrid (England) Chelsea
11	(Netherlands) Ajax (Germany) Borussia Dortmund (Italy) Juventus (France) Paris Saint-Germain (England) Tottenham Hotspur
10	(England) Arsenal (Spain) Sevilla

Clubs with fewer than 10 players:
Players	Clubs
8	(Belgium) Club Brugge (England) Brighton & Hove Albion (France) Rennes
7	(England) Leicester City (England) Liverpool (Germany) Eintracht Frankfurt (Germany) RB Leipzig (Italy) Milan (Qatar) Al-Duhail (Saudi Arabia) Al-Nassr
6	(Canada) CF Montréal (Costa Rica) Herediano (England) Brentford (England) Fulham (France) Monaco (Germany) Borussia Mönchengladbach (Italy) Inter Milan (Portugal) Benfica (Portugal) Porto (South Korea) Jeonbuk Hyundai Motors
5	(Croatia) Dinamo Zagreb (England) Newcastle United (England) Nottingham Forest (England) West Ham United (England) Wolverhampton Wanderers (France) Marseille (Germany) SC Freiburg (Greece) AEK Athens (Italy) Napoli (Italy) Torino (Mexico) Monterrey (Saudi Arabia) Al-Shabab (Spain) Real Betis (Spain) Villarreal (Turkey) Galatasaray (United States) Los Angeles FC
4	(Austria) Red Bull Salzburg (Brazil) Flamengo (England) Aston Villa (England) Everton (Germany) Bayer Leverkusen (Greece) Olympiacos (Iran) Persepolis (Italy) Atalanta (Italy) Fiorentina (Italy) Hellas Verona (Italy) Roma (Netherlands) PSV Eindhoven (Portugal) Sporting CP (Qatar) Al-Ahli (Doha) (Spain) Valencia (Saudi Arabia) Al-Ahli (Scotland) Celtic (Turkey) Beşiktaş (United States) Seattle Sounders FC
3	(Australia) Central Coast Mariners (Australia) Melbourne City (Belgium) Anderlecht (Belgium) Antwerp (Belgium) Genk (Canada) Toronto FC (Costa Rica) Alajuelense (Costa Rica) Saprissa (Denmark) Copenhagen (England) Leeds United (England) Reading (France) Lens (Germany) FC Augsburg (Germany) Mainz 05 (Germany) VfB Stuttgart (Germany) VfL Wolfsburg (Iran) Esteghlal (Italy) Salernitana (Italy) Sampdoria (Mexico) América (Mexico) Cruz Azul (Mexico) León (Mexico) Pachuca (Morocco) Wydad AC (Netherlands) Feyenoord (Qatar) Al-Gharafa (Scotland) Heart of Midlothian (Serbia) Red Star Belgrade (South Korea) Ulsan Hyundai (Spain) Athletic Bilbao (Switzerland) Young Boys (Tunisia) Espérance de Tunis (Uruguay) Nacional (Wales) Swansea City
2	(Argentina) River Plate (Denmark) Brøndby (Denmark) OB (England) Birmingham City (England) Bournemouth (England) Burnley (England) Crystal Palace (England) Luton Town (England) Queens Park Rangers (England) Sheffield United (England) Southampton (England) Sunderland (France) Angers (France) Clermont (France) Lille (France) Lyon (France) Montpellier (France) Nice (France) Strasbourg (France) Troyes (Germany) 1899 Hoffenheim (Germany) Werder Bremen (Iran) Sepahan (Italy) Bologna (Italy) Lazio (Italy) Spezia (Japan) Kawasaki Frontale; Kuwait SC (Mexico) Guadalajara (Mexico) Santos Laguna (Poland) Legia Warsaw (Portugal) Braga (Qatar) Al-Arabi (Qatar) Al-Rayyan (Saudi Arabia) Abha (Saudi Arabia) Al-Ittihad (Saudi Arabia) Al-Wehda (Scotland) Dundee United (South Korea) FC Seoul (Spain) Celta Vigo (Spain) Getafe (Spain) Mallorca (Spain) Osasuna (Spain) Valladolid (Switzerland) Basel (Switzerland) Luzern (Tunisia) Club Africain (Turkey) Fenerbahçe (Turkey) Kayserispor (Turkey) Trabzonspor (United States) Nashville SC (Wales) Cardiff City
1	(Argentina) Independiente (Argentina) Newell's Old Boys (Argentina) Talleres (Argentina) Vélez Sarsfield (Australia) Adelaide United (Australia) Sydney FC (Belgium) Cercle Brugge (Belgium) Charleroi (Belgium) Deinze (Belgium) Eupen (Belgium) Gent (Belgium) Mechelen (Belgium) Sint-Truiden (Belgium) Standard Liège (Brazil) Athletico Paranaense (Brazil) Palmeiras (Brazil) São Paulo (Cameroon) Colombe Sportive (Cameroon) Coton Sport (Canada) Vancouver Whitecaps FC (China) Shandong Taishan (China) Shanghai Shenhua (Colombia) Millonarios (Costa Rica) Cartaginés (Costa Rica) Guanacasteca (Costa Rica) Municipal Grecia (Costa Rica) Puntarenas (Costa Rica) San Carlos (Croatia) Hajduk Split (Croatia) Osijek (Cyprus) Omonia (Cyprus) Pafos (Denmark) Vejle (Ecuador) Aucas (Ecuador) Imbabura (Ecuador) Independiente del Valle (Ecuador) LDU Quito (Egypt) Al Ahly (Egypt) Zamalek (England) AFC Wimbledon (England) Bristol City (England) Huddersfield Town (England) Middlesbrough (England) Milton Keynes Dons (England) Norwich City (England) Portsmouth (England) Stoke City (England) Swindon Town (England) Watford (France) Amiens (France) Auxerre (France) Brest (France) Caen (France) Lorient (France) Nantes (France) Reims (France) Toulouse (Germany) 1. FC Köln (Germany) Fortuna Düsseldorf (Germany) Hannover 96 (Germany) Hertha BSC (Germany) Schalke 04 (Germany) FC St. Pauli (Germany) Union Berlin (Germany) VfL Bochum (Ghana) Asante Kotoko (Ghana) Hearts of Oak (Greece) Aris (Greece) Atromitos (Greece) Panetolikos (Greece) PAOK (Hungary) Ferencváros (Italy) Bari (Italy) Benevento (Italy) Brescia (Italy) Cremonese (Italy) Sassuolo (Italy) Udinese (Japan) Albirex Niigata (Japan) Fagiano Okayama (Japan) FC Tokyo (Japan) Gamba Osaka (Japan) Nagoya Grampus (Japan) Shimizu S-Pulse (Japan) Shonan Bellmare (Japan) Urawa Red Diamonds (Mexico) Juárez (Mexico) UNAM (Netherlands) Heerenveen (Poland) Lech Poznań (Poland) Pogoń Szczecin (Portugal) Chaves; Al-Wakrah; Qatar SC (Russia) Dynamo Moscow (Russia) Zenit Saint Petersburg (Saudi Arabia) Al-Ettifaq (Saudi Arabia) Al-Fateh (Saudi Arabia) Al-Tai (Scotland) Rangers (Scotland) St Johnstone (Scotland) St Mirren (South Korea) Daegu FC (South Korea) Daejeon Hana Citizen (South Korea) Gimcheon Sangmu (Spain) Almería (Spain) Cádiz (Spain) Espanyol (Spain) Leganés (Spain) Lugo (Spain) Ponferradina (Spain) Rayo Vallecano (Spain) Real Sociedad (Switzerland) Lugano (Switzerland) St. Gallen (Tunisia) CS Sfaxien (Tunisia) Étoile du Sahel (Tunisia) US Monastir (Turkey) Alanyaspor (Turkey) Antalyaspor (Turkey) Hatayspor (Turkey) Konyaspor (United Arab Emirates) Shabab Al-Ahli (United States) Atlanta United FC (United States) Charlotte FC (United States) Chicago Fire FC (United States) Columbus Crew (United States) FC Cincinnati (United States) FC Dallas (United States) Houston Dynamo FC (United States) Inter Miami CF (United States) LA Galaxy (United States) Minnesota United FC (United States) New York City FC (United States) New York Red Bulls (United States) Orlando City SC (United States) Philadelphia Union (United States) Real Salt Lake

=== Player representation by club confederation ===
Confederation	Players	Percentage
UEFA	603	72.56%
AFC	114	13.72%
CONCACAF	76	9.15%
CONMEBOL	21	2.53%
CAF	17	2.05%
OFC	0	0.00%

=== Average age of squads ===
Average age	Countries
24	Ghana
25	Ecuador, Spain, United States
26	Cameroon, Canada, England, France, Germany, Morocco, Netherlands, Portugal, Qatar, Senegal, Serbia, Wales
27	Argentina, Australia, Belgium, Brazil, Costa Rica, Croatia, Denmark, Japan, Poland, Saudi Arabia, South Korea, Switzerland, Tunisia, Uruguay
28	Iran, Mexico

=== Coaches representation by country ===
Coaches in bold represented their own country.

Number	Country	Coaches
3	Argentina	Gustavo Alfaro (Ecuador), Gerardo Martino (Mexico), **Lionel Scaloni**
3	Portugal	Paulo Bento (South Korea), Carlos Queiroz (Iran), **Fernando Santos**
3	Spain	**Luis Enrique**, Roberto Martínez (Belgium), Félix Sánchez (Qatar)
2	England	John Herdman (Canada), **Gareth Southgate**
2	France	**Didier Deschamps**, Hervé Renard (Saudi Arabia)
1	Australia	**Graham Arnold**
1	Brazil	**Tite**
1	Cameroon	**Rigobert Song**
1	Croatia	**Zlatko Dalić**
1	Colombia	Luis Fernando Suárez (Costa Rica)
1	Denmark	**Kasper Hjulmand**
1	Germany	**Hansi Flick**
1	Ghana	**Otto Addo**
1	Japan	**Hajime Moriyasu**
1	Morocco	**Walid Regragui**
1	Netherlands	**Louis van Gaal**
1	Poland	**Czesław Michniewicz**
1	Senegal	**Aliou Cissé**
1	Serbia	**Dragan Stojković**
1	Switzerland	**Murat Yakin**
1	Tunisia	**Jalel Kadri**
1	United States	**Gregg Berhalter**
1	Uruguay	**Diego Alonso**
1	Wales	**Rob Page**
