= KSFC (disambiguation) =

KSFC may refer to:

== Sports ==
=== Association football clubs ===
- Kalasin F.C. (KSFC) playing in Thai League 4
- Kumbo Strikers FC (KSFC) playing in Cameroon North West Regional League
- Kyoto Sanga FC playing in J1 League

== Other uses ==
- KSFC (FM 91.9 MHz), Spokane, Washington State, USA; a radio station
- Kennedy Space Flight Center, Cape Canaveral, Florida, USA
