= Emirati football league system =

- Country: United Arab Emirates
- Sport: Association football
- Promotion and relegation: Yes

National system
- Federation: United Arab Emirates Football Association
- Confederation: AFC
- Top division: Pro League
- Second division: First Division League
- Cup competition: League Cup; President's Cup; Super Cup

This is the setup of the association football league system in United Arab Emirates (UAE).

The tables below show the makeup of the system. The UAE Pro League sits at the top of the pyramid and two teams get promoted/relegated between the UAEPL and Division 1. UAE First Division League is the 2nd tier of the league system, below there are UAE Second and Third Division Leagues.

== System ==
Level	League
	Professional League
1	UAE Pro League; 14 clubs in one national division
	↓↑ 2 clubs
2	UAE First Division League; 15 clubs in one national division
	↓↑ 2 clubs up, 0 clubs down
	Semi Professional Leagues
3	UAE Second Division League; 14 clubs in one national division
	↓↑ 2 clubs down, 4 clubs up
4	UAE Third Division League; 17 clubs in one national division
