= Colombian football league system =

The Colombian football league system is a series of interconnected football leagues for clubs in Colombia, and is governed by the Colombian Football Federation at the national level. Since 2021, Difútbol organises the Categoría Primera C for amateur and reserve teams.

== Structure ==
The Colombian league system consists of two categories. At the top of the pyramid is Categoría Primera A or Primera A, which consists of the top 20 teams of the country. Below them is Categoría Primera B or Primera B. Teams in Primera A play independent of the 16 teams that make up Primera B.

== Current system ==
=== Men's ===
Level	League(s)/Division(s)
1	Categoría Primera A (Liga BetPlay Dimayor); 20 clubs
	↓↑ 2 clubs
2	Categoría Primera B (Torneo BetPlay Dimayor); 16 clubs

=== Women's ===
Level	League(s)/Division(s)
1	Liga Femenina Profesional (Liga Femenina BetPlay Dimayor); 17 clubs
