= Cameroonian football league system =

The Cameroonian football league system is a series of interconnected leagues for football clubs in Cameroon.

== Men ==
=== National leagues ===
| Level | League(s)/Division(s) |
|---|---|
| 1 | Elite One; 14 clubs |
| 2 | Elite Two; 16 Clubs |

=== Regional and Departmental leagues ===
| Regional Leagues (Level 3) | Departmental Leagues (Level 4) |
|---|---|
| Adamaoua | Djérem |
| Adamaoua | Faro et Déo |
| Adamaoua | Mayo Banyo |
| Adamaoua | Mbéré |
| Adamaoua | Vina |
| Centre | Nyong et Kellé |
| Centre | Méfou et Afamba |
| Centre | Mbam et Kim |
| Centre | Mfoundi |
| Centre | Nyong et Mfoumou |
| Centre | Lékié |
| Centre | Mbam et Inoubou |
| Centre | Nyong et So'o |
| Centre | Haute Sanaga |
| Centre | Mefou et Akono |
| East | Boumba et Ngoko |
| East | Haut Nyong |
| East | Kadey |
| East | Lom-et-Djerem |
| Far North | Diamaré |
| Far North | Mayo Danay |
| Far North | Mayo Kani |
| Far North | Logone et Chari |
| Far North | Mayo Sava |
| Far North | Mayo Tsanaga |
| Littoral | Wouri |
| Littoral | Nkam |
| Littoral | Sanaga Maritime |
| Littoral | Moungo |
| North | Bénoué |
| North | Mayo Louti |
| North | Mayo Rey |
| North | Faro |
| Northwest | Boyo |
| Northwest | Bui |
| Northwest | Donga Mantung |
| Northwest | Menchum |
| Northwest | Mezam |
| Northwest | Momo |
| Northwest | Ngo ketunjia |
| South | Dja et Lobo |
| South | Mvila |
| South | Océan |
| South | Vallée du Ntem |
| Southwest | Fako |
| Southwest | Koupé Manengouba |
| Southwest | Lebialem |
| Southwest | Manyu |
| Southwest | Meme |
| Southwest | Ndian |
| West | Bamboutos |
| West | Haut Nkam |
| West | Hauts Plateaux |
| West | Koung Khi |
| West | Menoua |
| West | Mifi |
| West | Ndé |
| West | Noun |

== Women ==
| Level | League(s)/Division(s) |
|---|---|
| 1 | Cameroonian Women's Championship; 12 clubs |
