= 2025 Jeonbuk Hyundai Motors season =

Jeonbuk Hyundai Motors
2025 season
- Manager: Gus Poyet
- Stadium: Jeonju World Cup Stadium; Jeonju, Jeonbuk
- K League 1: 1st (champions)
- Korea Cup: Winners
- ACL2: Quarter-finals
- Top goalscorer: League: Jeon Jin-woo (16 goals); All: Jeon Jin-woo (18 goals)
- Average home league attendance: 18,425
- Biggest win: 4–0 v Port F.C. (A); 13 February, ACL2; 4–0 v Daegu FC (A); 27 May, K League 1
- Biggest defeat: 0–2 v Sydney FC (H); 6 March, ACL2; 1–3 v Pohang Steelers (A); 24 August, K League 1
Home colours	Away colours	Third colours
- All statistics correct as of 6 December 2025.

The 2025 Jeonbuk Hyundai Motors season was their 32nd season in existence, and the 30th consecutive season in the K League 1. In addition to the league, the club competed in the 2025 Korea Cup and in the knock-out stage of the 2024–25 AFC Champions League Two. Jeonbuk Hyundai Motors earned a domestic double, winning their 10th league title and sixth cup triumph.

== Players ==
No.	Name	Nationality	Date of birth (age)	Previous club	Contract since	Contract end
Goalkeepers
1	Kim Jeong-hoon	(South Korea)	20 April 2001 (age 25)	(South Korea) Gimcheon Sangmu FC	2017	2026
31	Song Bum-keun	(South Korea)	15 October 1997 (age 29)	(Japan) Shonan Bellmare	2025	
81	Jeon Ji-wan	(South Korea)	14 May 2004 (age 22)	(Japan) FC Ryukyu	2020	
91	Gong Si-hyeon	(South Korea)	23 February 2005 (age 21)	Youth Team	2021	2026
Defenders
2	Kim Young-bin	(South Korea)	20 September 1991 (age 35)	(South Korea) Gangwon FC	2025	
3	Choi Woo-jin	(South Korea)	18 July 2004 (age 22)	(South Korea) Incheon United	2025	
23	Kim Tae-hwan	(South Korea)	24 July 1989 (age 37)	(South Korea) Ulsan HD FC	2024	2025
25	Choi Chul-soon	(South Korea)	8 February 1987 (age 39)	(South Korea) Gimcheon Sangmu FC	2006	2025
26	Hong Jeong-ho	(South Korea)	12 August 1989 (age 37)	(China) Jiangsu F.C.	2018	
29	Kim Jun-yeong	(South Korea)	31 May 2004 (age 22)	(South Korea) Chosun University	2025	2025
70	Lee Jae-jun	(South Korea)	23 October 2006 (age 20)	(South Korea) Yongin City FC	2025	2025
72	Hwang Seung-jun	(South Korea)	3 August 2005 (age 21)	(South Korea) Yong In University	2025	2025
77	Kim Tae-Hyun	(South Korea)	19 December 1996 (age 29)	(South Korea) Jeonnam Dragons	2024	
90	Jeong Sang-woon	(South Korea)	3 April 2003 (age 23)	(South Korea) Sangji University	2025	2025
94	Yeon Je-un	(South Korea)	28 August 1994 (age 32)	(South Korea) Jeju United	2024	
Midfielders
4	Park Jin-seop (C)	(South Korea)	23 October 1995 (age 31)	(South Korea) Daejeon Hana Citizen	2023	2024
5	João Gamboa	(Portugal)	31 August 1996 (age 30)	(Poland) Pogoń Szczecin	2025	
6	Maeng Seong-ung	(South Korea)	4 February 1998 (age 28)	(South Korea) Gimcheon Sangmu FC	2022	
8	Han Kook-young	(South Korea)	19 April 1990 (age 36)	(South Korea) Gangwon FC	2024	2025
13	Kang Sang-yoon	(South Korea)	31 May 2004 (age 22)	(South Korea) Busan IPark	2022	
17	Jin Tae-Ho	(South Korea)	20 January 2006 (age 20)	Youth Team	2021	2026
18	Lee Jun-ho	(South Korea)	28 September 2002 (age 24)	(South Korea) Jeonnam Dragons	2023	2024
28	Lee Yeong-jae	(South Korea)	13 September 1994 (age 32)	(South Korea) Gimcheon Sangmu FC	2024	
22	Kwon Chang-hoon	(South Korea)	30 June 1994 (age 32)	(South Korea) Suwon Samsung Bluewings	2024	2025
24	Park Kyu-min	(South Korea)	8 June 2001 (age 25)	(South Korea) Gwangju University	2022	
34	Eom Seung-min	(South Korea)	2 May 2003 (age 23)	(South Korea) FC Mokpo	2024	
36	Jang Nam-ung	(South Korea)	9 February 2004 (age 22)	(South Korea) Sangji University	2024	
88	Yoon Hyun-seok	(South Korea)	8 November 2003 (age 23)	(South Korea) Hongik University	2025	2025
97	Kim Jin-gyu	(South Korea)	24 February 1997 (age 29)	(South Korea) Gimcheon Sangmu FC	2022	2026
99	Kim Chang-hoon	(South Korea)	23 October 2004 (age 22)	Youth Team	2023	
Forwards
7	Lee Dong-jun	(South Korea)	1 February 1997 (age 29)	(South Korea) Gimcheon Sangmu FC	2023	
9	Tiago Orobó	(Brazil)	28 October 1993 (age 33)	(South Korea) Daejeon Hana Citizen	2024	
10	Song Min-kyu	(South Korea)	12 September 1999 (age 27)	(South Korea) Pohang Steelers	2021	2025
11	Lee Seung-woo	(South Korea)	6 January 1998 (age 28)	(South Korea) Suwon FC	2024	2025
14	Jeon Jin-woo	(South Korea)	9 September 1999 (age 27)	(South Korea) Suwon Samsung Bluewings	2024	2026
15	Sung Jin-young	(South Korea)	21 May 2003 (age 23)	(South Korea) Korea University	2024	2024
16	Park Jae-yong	(South Korea)	13 March 2000 (age 26)	(South Korea) FC Anyang	2023	2026
21	Patrick Twumasi	(Ghana)	9 May 1994 (age 32)	(Cyprus) Pafos	2025	
27	Lee Gyu-dong	(South Korea)	24 January 2004 (age 22)	Youth Team	2023	2024
36	Jang Nam-ung	(South Korea)	9 February 2004 (age 22)	(South Korea) Sangji University	2024	2024
39	Kang Hyeon-jong	(South Korea)	13 January 2004 (age 22)	(South Korea) Yong In University	2025	2025
96	Andrea Compagno	(Italy)	22 April 1996 (age 30)	(China) Tianjin Jinmen Tiger	2025	2026
	Lee Joon-ho	(South Korea)	28 September 2002 (age 24)	(South Korea) Busan IPark	2023	2025
Players loaned out
21	Ahn Hyeon-beom	(South Korea)	21 December 1994 (age 31)	(South Korea) Jeju United	2023	2026
44	Kim Ha-jun	(South Korea)	17 July 2002 (age 24)	(South Korea) FC Anyang	2024	
50	Ji Si-woo	(South Korea)	5 August 2002 (age 24)	(South Korea) Yonsei University	2024	2024
	Jeong Tae-wook	(South Korea)	16 May 1997 (age 29)	(Australia) Western Sydney Wanderers	2023	
Players enlisted
6	Lee Soo-bin	(South Korea)	7 May 2000 (age 26)	(South Korea) Pohang Steelers	2022	
33	Jeon Byung-kwan	(South Korea)	10 November 2002 (age 24)	(South Korea) Daejeon Hana Citizen	2024	2026
Players who left during mid-season
7	Hernandes Rodrigues	(Brazil)	2 September 1999 (age 27)	(South Korea) Incheon United FC	2024	
19	Nana Boateng	(Ghana)	10 May 1994 (age 32)	(Romania) CFR Cluj	2023	
30	Andrigo	(Brazil)	27 February 1995 (age 31)	(China) Chengdu Rongcheng	2024	2025
42	Joel Anasmo	(Australia) (South Sudan)	24 September 2004 (age 22)	(Australia) Perth Glory	2025	2025
71	Han Kyo-won	(South Korea)	15 June 1990 (age 36)	(South Korea) Hwaseong FC	2014	

== Backroom staff ==
=== Coaching staff ===
- Manager: (Uruguay) Gus Poyet
- Assistant manager: (Argentina) Mauricio Taricco
- First-team coach: (South Korea) Jung Jo-gook
- Goalkeeper coach: (South Korea) Hwang Hee-hoon
- Analysis coach: (Uruguay) Diego Poyet
- Fitness coach: (Greece) Panagiotis Voulgaris

Source: Official website

=== Support staff ===
- Physiotherapist: (Brazil) Gilvan Oliveira
- Medical department: (South Korea) Kim Jae-oh, (South Korea) Kim Byeong-seon, (South Korea) Lee Gyu-yeol
- Interpreters: (South Korea) Kim Min-su, (South Korea) Mun Keon-ho, (South Korea) Choe Dong-eun
- Kit manager: (South Korea) Lee Min-ho
- Analysts: (South Korea) Lee Sun-gu, (South Korea) Kim Ki-hyun

Source: Official website

== Transfers ==
=== Pre-season ===
==== In ====
Transfer In

Date	Position	Player	Transferred from	Ref
Permanent Transfer
31 December 2024	GK	(South Korea) Jeon Ji-wan	(Japan) FC Ryukyu (J2)	End of loan
31 December 2024	DF	(South Korea) Lee You-hyeon	(South Korea) Gangwon FC	End of loan (Note: Lee You-hyeon released after returning from loan and move to Gangwon permanently.)
31 December 2024	MF	(South Korea) Oh Jae-hyeok	(South Korea) Seongnam FC (K2)	End of loan
31 December 2024	MF	(South Korea) Lee Ji-hoon	(South Korea) Cheonan City FC (K2)	End of loan
31 December 2024	MF	(South Korea) Park Ju-yeong	(South Korea) Jeju United	End of loan (Note: Park Ju-yeong loaned to Hawseong for new season)
31 December 2024	MF	(South Korea) Kang Sang-yoon	(South Korea) Suwon FC	End of loan
31 December 2024	FW	(South Korea) Han Kyo-won	(South Korea) Suwon FC	End of loan
31 December 2024	FW	(South Korea) Lee Gyu-dong	(South Korea) Suwon Samsung Bluewings (K2)	End of loan
31 December 2024	FW	(South Korea) Lee Joon-ho	(South Korea) Busan IPark (K2)	End of loan
17 January 2025	GK	(South Korea) Song Bum-keun	(Japan) Shonan Bellmare	Undisclosed
17 January 2025	DF	(South Korea) Kim Young-bin	(South Korea) Gangwon FC	Undisclosed
17 January 2025	DF	(South Korea) Kim Jun-yeong	(South Korea) Chosun University	Free
17 January 2025	DF	(South Korea) Jeong Sang-woon	(South Korea) Sangji University	Free
17 January 2025	DF	(South Korea) Hwang Seung-jun	(South Korea) Yong In University	Free
17 January 2025	DF	(South Korea) Lee Jae-jun	(South Korea) Yongin City FC	Free
17 January 2025	MF	(South Korea) Yoon Hyun-seok	(South Korea) Hongik University	Free
17 January 2025	FW	(South Korea) Kang Hyeon-jong	(South Korea) Yong In University	Free
5 February 2025	FW	(Italy) Andrea Compagno	(China) Tianjin Jinmen Tiger	Undisclosed
7 February 2025	DF	(South Korea) Choi Woo-jin	(South Korea) Incheon United	Undisclosed
Loan Transfer
31 March 2025	MF	(Australia) (South Sudan) Joel Anasmo	(Australia) Perth Glory	Season loan

==== Out ====
Transfer Out

Position	Player	Transferred To	Ref
GK	(South Korea) Kim Jun-hong	(United States) D.C. United	Undisclosed
GK	(South Korea) Hwang Jae-yun	(South Korea) Suwon FC	Free
GK	(South Korea) Kim Tae-yang	(South Korea) Paju Citizen FC	Free
DF	(South Korea) Park Chang-woo	(South Korea) Busan IPark (K2)	Free
DF	(South Korea) Jeong Woo-jae	(South Korea) Daegu FC	Free
DF	(South Korea) Lee You-hyeon	(South Korea) Gangwon FC	Free
DF	(South Korea) Kim Jin-su	(South Korea) FC Seoul	Undisclosed
DF	(South Korea) Ku Jar-yong	(South Korea) Bucheon FC 1995	Free
DF	(South Korea) Lee Jae-ik	(South Korea) Ulsan HD	Undisclosed
DF	(South Korea) Jang Min-jun	(South Korea) Ansan Greeners FC	Free
DF	(South Korea) Lee Woo-yeon	(South Korea) Geoje Citizen FC	Free
DF	(South Korea) Park Jun-beom	(South Korea) Pocheon Citizen FC	Free
MF	(South Korea) Park Si-hwa	(South Korea) Ansan Greeners FC	Free
MF	(South Korea) Park Chae-joon	(South Korea) Ansan Greeners FC	Free
MF	(South Korea) Yeo Hong-gyu	(South Korea) Hwaseong FC	Free
MF	(South Korea) Park Ju-yeong	(South Korea) Hwaseong FC	Free
MF	(South Korea) Yu Je-ho	(South Korea) Gwangju FC	Free
MF	(South Korea) Ma Ji-kang	(South Korea) Sejong SA FC	Free
MF	(South Korea) Kang Young-suk	(South Korea)	Free
FW	(South Korea) Lee Ji-hoon	(South Korea) Cheonan City	Free
FW	(South Korea) Oh Jae-hyeok	(South Korea) Jeju SK	Free
FW	(South Korea) Moon Seon-min	(South Korea) FC Seoul	Free
FW	(South Korea) Han Kyo-won	(South Korea) Chungnam Asan FC	Free

Loan Out

Position	Player	Loan Out	Ref
DF	(South Korea) Jeong Tae-wook	(Australia) Western Sydney Wanderers	Season loan till May 2025
DF	(South Korea) Ji Si-woo	(South Korea) Gwangju FC	Season loan till December 2025
MF	(South Korea) Kim Ha-jun	(South Korea) Seoul E-land	Season loan till December 2025
MF	(South Korea) Park Ju-yeong	(South Korea) Hwaseong FC	Season loan till December 2025
MF	(South Korea) Maeng Seong-ung	(South Korea) Gimcheon Sangmu FC	Military Duty
FW	(South Korea) Lee Dong-jun	(South Korea) Gimcheon Sangmu FC	Military Duty
MF	(South Korea) Jeon Byung-kwan	(South Korea) Gimcheon Sangmu FC	Military Duty
MF	(South Korea) Lee Soo-bin	(South Korea) Gimcheon Sangmu FC	Military Duty

Loan Return (Out)

Position	Player	Returned To	Ref
DF	(South Korea) Kim Tae-Hyun	(South Korea) Jeonnam Dragons	End of loan

=== Mid-season ===
==== In ====
Transfer In

Position	Player	Transferred from	Ref
MF	(Portugal) João Gamboa	(Poland) Pogoń Szczecin	Free
FW	(Ghana) Patrick Twumasi	(Cyprus) Pafos	Free

Loan Return (In)

Position	Player	Returned From	Ref
DF	(South Korea) Jeong Tae-wook	(Australia) Western Sydney Wanderers	End of loan (Note: Jeong moved to FC Seoul for loan after returning from Australia.)
MF	(South Korea) Maeng Seong-ung	(South Korea) Gimcheon Sangmu FC	End of Military Duty
FW	(South Korea) Lee Dong-jun	(South Korea) Gimcheon Sangmu FC	End of Military Duty

Loan In

Position	Player	Returned From	Ref

==== Out ====
Transfer Out

Position	Player	Transferred To	Ref
MF	(Brazil) Andrigo	(South Korea) Suwon FC	Free
MF	(Ghana) Nana Boateng	(South Korea)	Free
FW	(Brazil) Hernandes Rodrigues	(South Korea) Daejeon Hana Citizen	Free

Loan Out

Position	Player	Loan Out	Ref
DF	(South Korea) Ahn Hyeon-beom	(South Korea) Suwon	Season loan till Dec 2025
DF	(South Korea) Jeong Tae-wook	(South Korea) FC Seoul	Season loan till Dec 2025 (Note: Jeong moved to FC Seoul for loan after returning from Australia.)

Loan Return (Out)

Position	Player	Returned To	Ref
MF	(Australia) (South Sudan) Joel Anasmo	(Australia) Perth Glory	End of loan

== Friendly matches ==
Win Draw Loss

=== Tour of Thailand (2 Jan - 4 Feb) ===
11 January 2025 1	(South Korea) Jeonbuk Hyundai Motor	1–1	(South Korea) Yonsei University	Thailand
	Jeon Jin-woo 11'

18 January 2025 2	(South Korea) Jeonbuk Hyundai Motor	4–1	China U-20	Bangkok, Thailand
	Song Min-kyu 3'; Park Jae-yong 55'; Andrigo 76'; Ahn Hyeon-beom 90'		Zhang Zhixiong (??)

25 January 2025 2	(South Korea) Jeonbuk Hyundai Motor	1–2	(China) Yunnan Yukun	Bangkok, Thailand
				Stadium: Thammasat Stadium

== Competitions ==
=== Overall record ===
Competition	First match	Last match	Starting round	Final position	Record							
Competition	First match	Last match	Starting round	Final position	Pld	W	D	L	GF	GA	GD	Win %
K League 1	16 February	30 November	Matchday 1	Winners	38	23	10	5	64	32	+32	60.53
Korea Cup	16 April	4 December	Round 3	Winners	6	5	1	0	12	5	+7	83.33
ACL 2	13 February	13 March	Round of 16	Quarter-finals	4	2	0	2	7	5	+2	50.00
Total					48	30	11	7	83	42	+41	62.50

Source: Soccerway

=== K League 1 ===
==== Matches ====
As usual, the league season will be played with 38 matches split in two stages. After 33 league matches between the 12 participating teams, the teams are split into the Final Round (Top 6 teams, which aims to won an AFC Champions spot) and Relegation Round (Bottom 6 teams, that aims to survive relegation).

16 February 2025 1	Jeonbuk Hyundai Motors	2–1	Gimcheon Sangmu FC	Jeonju
	Park Jin-seop 45+4' (yellow card) 57'; Jeon Jin-woo 81' (yellow card) 89'; Jeon Byung-Kwan (yellow card) 84'	Report	Yu Kang-hyun 14'	Stadium: Jeonju World Cup Stadium; Attendance: 19,619; Referee: Shin Yong-jun

23 February 2025 2	Jeonbuk Hyundai Motors	2–2	Gwangju FC	Jeonju
	Andrea Compagno 21', 66' (yellow card) 58'	Report	Jasir Asani 14'; Oh Hoo-sung 64'; Byeon Jun-Soo (yellow card) 51'; Kang Hui-Su (yellow card) 75'	Stadium: Jeonju World Cup Stadium; Attendance: 15,393; Referee: Chae Sang-hyeop

1 March 2025 3	Ulsan HD	1–0	Jeonbuk Hyundai Motors	Ulsan
	Darijan Bojanić 66'; Heo Yool (yellow card) 6'; Yoon Jong-gyu (yellow card) 35'; Seo Myung-Guan (yellow card) 76'; Kim Min-hyeok (yellow card) 77'	Report	Park Jin-seop (yellow card) 6'; Lee Seung-woo (yellow card) 23'; Han Kook-young (yellow card) 42'	Stadium: Ulsan Munsu Football Stadium; Attendance: 26,317; Referee: Kim Woo-sung

9 March 2025 4	Jeonbuk Hyundai Motors	0–1	Gangwon FC	Jeonju
	Song Bum-keun (yellow card) 90+3'	Report	Kim Gyeong-Min 90'	Stadium: Jeonju World Cup Stadium; Attendance: 14,090; Referee: Kim Jong-hyuk

16 March 2025 5	Jeonbuk Hyundai Motors	2–2	Pohang Steelers	Jeonju
	Jeon Jin-woo 25' (yellow card) 73'; Bak Jae-yong 30'; Han Kook-young (red card) 53'	Report	Lee Tae-seok 51'; Cho Sang-hyeok 84'; Jorge Luiz (yellow card) 81'	Stadium: Jeonju World Cup Stadium; Attendance: 10,442; Referee: Ko Hyung-jin

30 March 2025 6	FC Anyang	0–1	Jeonbuk Hyundai Motors	Anyang
	Kim Da-sol (red card) 90+9'	Report	Andrea Compagno 53' (pen.); Kim Tae-hyun (yellow card) 45+2'; Song Bum-keun (yellow card) 83'; Nana Boateng (yellow card) 90+3'	Stadium: Anyang Stadium; Attendance: 10,031; Referee: Chae Sang-hyeop

5 April 2025 7	Daejeon Hana Citizen	0–2	Jeonbuk Hyundai Motors	Daejeon
		Report	Jeon Jin-woo 46'; Jeon Byung-kwan 90'; Andrea Compagno (yellow card) 24'; Hernandes Rodrigues (yellow card) 47'	Stadium: Daejeon World Cup Stadium; Attendance: 14,622; Referee: Lee Dong-Jun

13 April 2025 8	Jeonbuk Hyundai Motors	1–1	Jeju SK	Jeonju
	Andrea Compagno 86' (yellow card) 66'	Report	Yu In-soo 42'; Oh Jae-hyeok (yellow card) 62'; Lim Chai-min (yellow card) 90+8'	Stadium: Jeonju World Cup Stadium; Attendance: 10,958; Referee: Kim Woo-sung

20 April 2025 9	Jeonbuk Hyundai Motors	3–1	Daegu FC	Jeonju
	Jeon Jin-woo 4', 37'; Andrea Compagno 17'; Hong Jeong-Ho (yellow card) 77'; Tiago Orobó (yellow card) 85'	Report	Jeong Jae-Sang 81'	Stadium: Jeonju World Cup Stadium; Attendance: 12,897; Referee: Chae Sang-hyeop

26 April 2025 10	Suwon FC	1–2	Jeonbuk Hyundai Motors	Suwon
	Lee Taek-Geun 81'; Lee Jae-won 90+1'; Luan Dias (yellow card) 67'	Report	Kim Jin-Kyu 64'; Jeon Jin-woo 90+6' (yellow card) 90+7'; Park Jin-seop (yellow card) 30'	Stadium: Suwon Sports Complex; Attendance: 7,131; Referee: Seol Tae-hwan

3 May 2025 11	FC Seoul	0–1	Jeonbuk Hyundai Motors	Seoul
	Kim Ju-sung (yellow card) 79'	Report	Song Min-kyu 24'; Han Kook-young (yellow card) 84'; Park Jin-seop (yellow card) 85'; Tiago Orobó (yellow card) 90+8'	Stadium: Seoul World Cup Stadium; Attendance: 48,008; Referee: Song Min-seok

6 May 2025 12	Jeonbuk Hyundai Motors	1–1	Daejeon Hana Citizen	Jeonju
	Jeon Jin-woo 88'	Report	Kim In-Gyun 90+3'; Kim Hyeon-Ug (yellow card) 41'	Stadium: Jeonju World Cup Stadium; Attendance: 24,338; Referee: Park Byeong-jin

11 May 2025 13	Gwangju FC	0–1	Jeonbuk Hyundai Motors	Gwangju
	Park Tae-jun (yellow card) 75'	Report	Jeon Jin-woo 40'; Kim Young-bin (yellow card) 54'	Stadium: Gwangju Football Stadium; Attendance: 8,444; Referee: Lee Dong-Jun

17 May 2025 14	Jeonbuk Hyundai Motors	2–0	FC Anyang	Jeonju
	Jeon Jin-woo 12', 36'; Kim Young-bin (yellow card) 23'	Report	Bruno Mota (yellow card) 6'	Stadium: Jeonju World Cup Stadium; Attendance: 21,021; Referee: Kim Chong-hyuk

23 May 2025 15	Jeju SK	0–0	Jeonbuk Hyundai Motors	Seogwipo
	Rim Chang-woo (yellow card) 14'; Kim Ryun-seong (yellow card) 21'; Yuri (yellow card) 79'	Report	Kim Tae-hwan (yellow card) 25'; Hong Jeong-Ho (yellow card) 30'; Kim Jin-Kyu (yellow card) 50'; Tiago Orobó (yellow card) 52'; Kim Young-bin (yellow card) 80'; Jeon Jin-woo (yellow card) 81'	Stadium: Jeju World Cup Stadium; Attendance: 6,224; Referee: Ko Hyung-jin

27 May 2025 16	Daegu FC	0–4	Jeonbuk Hyundai Motors	Daegu
		Report	Hwang Jae-won 17' (o.g.); Tiago Orobó 45+6'; Jeon Jin-woo 66'; Lee Yeong-jae 71'	Stadium: DGB Daegu Bank Park; Attendance: 7,994; Referee: Lee Dong-Jun

31 May 2025 17	Jeonbuk Hyundai Motors	3–1	Ulsan HD	Jeonju
	Song Min-kyu 26'; Park Jin-seop 86'; Hong Jeong-Ho (yellow card) 86'; Tiago Orobó 90+8' (yellow card) 90+5'	Report	Lee Chung-yong 11'; Jung Woo-young (yellow card) 36'	Stadium: Jeonju World Cup Stadium; Attendance: 31,830; Referee: Kim Dae-young

13 June 2025 18	Gangwon FC	0–3	Jeonbuk Hyundai Motors	Chuncheon
	Marko Tući (yellow card) 35'; Vitor Gabriel (yellow card) 86'	Report	Tiago Orobó 6', 32'; Jeon Jin-woo 79'; Park Jin-seop (yellow card) 24'; Kang Sang-yoon (yellow card) 45+2'; Song Bum-keun (yellow card) 76'	Stadium: Chuncheon Songam Sports Town; Attendance: 6,219; Referee: Shin Yong-jun

17 June 2025 19	Jeonbuk Hyundai Motors	3–2	Suwon FC	Jeonju
	Kim Jin-gyu 52'; Andrea Compagno 72'; Kim Tae-Han 89' (o.g.); Jeon Jin-woo (yellow card) 45'; Kang Sang-yoon (yellow card) 88'	Report	Kim Do-Yoon 5'; Pablo Sabbag 31'; Lee Jae-won (yellow card) 15'; Ahn Joon-soo (yellow card) 87'	Stadium: Jeonju World Cup Stadium; Attendance: 11,355; Referee: Kim Chong-hyuk

21 June 2025 20	Jeonbuk Hyundai Motors	1–1	FC Seoul	Jeonju
	Song Min-kyu 45+2'	Report	Ryu Jae-moon 25'	Stadium: Jeonju World Cup Stadium; Attendance: 22,862; Referee: Ko Hyung-jin

27 June 2025 21	Gimcheon Sangmu FC	1–2	Jeonbuk Hyundai Motors	Gimcheon
	Won Ki-jong 79'; Kim Kang-san (yellow card) 32'; Park Sang-Hyeok (yellow card) 49'; Park Dae-Won (yellow card) 56'	Report	Andrea Compagno 36', 53'; Park Jin-seop (yellow card) 90+9'	Stadium: Gimcheon Stadium; Attendance: 3,840; Referee: Kim Dae-young

19 July 2025 22	Pohang Steelers	2–3	Jeonbuk Hyundai Motors	Pohang
	Hong Yun-sang 32'; Lee Ho-jae 44'; Eo Jeong-won (yellow card) 28'; Lee Dong-Hee (yellow card) 79'	Report	Lee Seung-woo 65'; Tiago Orobó 80' (yellow card) 80'; Hong Jeong-Ho 90+7'; Jeon Jin-woo (yellow card) 29'; Song Min-kyu (yellow card) 34'; Kim Tae-hwan (yellow card) 87'	Stadium: Pohang Steel Yard; Attendance: 13,973; Referee: Lee Dong-jun

23 July 2025 23	Jeonbuk Hyundai Motors	2–0	Gangwon FC	Jeonju
	Kim Jin-gyu 38'; Andrea Compagno 43' (pen.); Kim Tae-hwan (yellow card) 23'; João Gamboa (yellow card) 75'	Report	Shin Min-Ha (yellow card) 5'; Song Jun-Seok (yellow card) 43'; Kim Dae-woo (red card) 45+2'	Stadium: Jeonju World Cup Stadium; Attendance: 13,795; Referee: Jung Hoe-su

26 July 2025 24	Gwangju FC	1–2	Jeonbuk Hyundai Motors	Gwangju
	Ha Seung-un 76'; Sin Chang-moo (yellow card) 27'; Kyoung Rok Choi (yellow card) 80'	Report	Kim Jin-Kyu 14'; Tiago Orobó 90+4'; Park Jin-seop (yellow card) 27'; Yeon Je-woon (yellow card) 66'; Kim Young-bin (yellow card) 86'	Stadium: Gwangju Football Stadium; Attendance: 9,544; Referee: Kim Woo-sung

8 August 2025 25	Jeonbuk Hyundai Motors	2–1	FC Anyang	Jeonju
	Park Jin-seop 21'; Lee Seung-woo 88'; Kim Young-bin (yellow card) 90+6'	Report	Thomas Oude Kotte 75'	Stadium: Jeonju World Cup Stadium; Attendance: 21,346; Referee: Kim Dae-yong

16 August 2025 26	Jeonbuk Hyundai Motors	3–0	Daegu FC	Jeonju
	Andrea Compagno 27', 55'; Jeon Jin-woo 83'; João Gamboa (yellow card) 4'; Yeon Je-woon (yellow card) 58'	Report		Stadium: Jeonju World Cup Stadium; Attendance: 23,460; Referee: Ko Hyung-jin

24 August 2025 27	Pohang Steelers	3–1	Jeonbuk Hyundai Motors	Pohang
	Jorge Luiz 1', 45' (pen.); Park Seung-wook 24'; Juninho Rocha (yellow card) 60'; Kim In-sung (yellow card) 90+5'	Report	Tiago Orobó 16' (pen.) (yellow card) 30'; Kim Tae-Hyun (yellow card) 44'; Kim Young-bin (yellow card) 70'	Stadium: Pohang Steel Yard; Attendance: 11,582; Referee: Park Byung-jin

30 August 2025 28	Ulsan HD	0–2	Jeonbuk Hyundai Motors	Ulsan
	Ko Seung-Beom (yellow card) 54'; Lee Hui-Gyun (yellow card) 71'; Yoon Jae-Seok (yellow card) 90+4'; Jeong Seung-Hyeon (yellow card) 90+7'	Report	Lee Yeong-jae 54'; Jeon Jin-woo 59' (yellow card) 7'; Kim Tae-Hyun (yellow card) 31'; Kim Jin-Kyu (yellow card) 45+3'; Park Jin-seop (yellow card) 71'	Stadium: Ulsan Munsu Football Stadium; Attendance: 23,294; Referee: Seol Tae-hwan

13 September 2025 29	Jeonbuk Hyundai Motors	1–0	Daejeon Hana Citizen	Jeonju
	Andrea Compagno 65' (pen.); João Gamboa (yellow card) 79'; Song Bumkeun (yellow card) 90+5'; Kim Tae-Hyun (yellow card) 90+8'; Lee Seung-woo (yellow card) 90+9'	Report	Kim Jin-ya (yellow card) 36'; Masatoshi Ishida (yellow card) 55'; Chang-Rae Ha (yellow card) 81'	Stadium: Jeonju World Cup Stadium; Attendance: 22,588; Referee: Kim Jong-hyuk

20 September 2025 30	Jeonbuk Hyundai Motors	1–2	Gimcheon Sangmu FC	Jeonju
	Kim Jin-kyu 63'; Choi Woo-jin (yellow card) 29'; Park Jin-seop (yellow card) 44'; Patrick Twumasi (yellow card) 85'	Report	Kim Seung-Sub 39'; Park Sang-hyeok 45+3'; Kim Kang-San (yellow card) 17'; Lee Seung-won (yellow card) 79'; Lee Dong-gyeong (penalty missed) 87; Go Jae-hyeon (yellow card) 90+3'	Stadium: Jeonju World Cup Stadium; Attendance: 17,212; Referee: Ko Hyung-jin

27 September 2025 31	FC Seoul	1–1	Jeonbuk Hyundai Motors	Seoul
	Yeon Je-woon 90+6' (o.g.); Lee Seung-Mo (yellow card) 90+7'	Report	Song Min-kyu 84' (yellow card) 84'; Kim Tae-hwan (yellow card) 71'; Tiago Orobó (yellow card) 89'	Stadium: Seoul World Cup Stadium; Attendance: 31,348; Referee: Seol Tae-hwan

3 October 2025 32	Jeju SK	1–1	Jeonbuk Hyundai Motors	Seogwipo
	Nam Tae-hee 90+7'	Report	Tiago Orobó 27'; Lee Seung-woo (yellow card) 33'; Jeon Jin-woo (yellow card) 90'	Stadium: Jeju World Cup Stadium; Attendance: 6,102; Referee: Lee Dong-jun

18 October 2025 33	Jeonbuk Hyundai Motors	2–0	Suwon FC	Jeonju
	Andrea Compagno 1'; Tiago Orobó 62' (pen.); Song Min-kyu (yellow card) 45+3'; Han Kook-young (yellow card) 80'	Report	Lee Jae-won (yellow card) 90'; Kim Tae-han (yellow card) 90+8'	Stadium: Jeonju World Cup Stadium; Attendance: 21,899; Referee: Kim Hee-gon

25 October 2025 34	Jeonbuk Hyundai Motors	2–3	Gimcheon Sangmu FC	Jeonju
	Lee Seung-woo 6' (yellow card) 56'; Jeon Jin-woo 30'; Kim Tae-hwan (yellow card) 86'	Report	Tiago Orobó 27' (o.g.); Lee Dong-gyeong 48', 72'	Stadium: Jeonju World Cup Stadium; Attendance: 8,498; Referee: Chae Sang-hyeop

1 November 2025 35	Gangwon FC	0–0	Jeonbuk Hyundai Motors	Chuncheon
	Song Jun-seok (yellow card) 64'; Kim Do-hyun (yellow card) 83'	Report	Kim Tae-hyun (yellow card) 62'; Tiago Orobó (yellow card) 67'; Maeng Seong-ung (yellow card) 81'; Choi Woo-jin (yellow card) 83'	Stadium: Chuncheon Songam Sports Town; Attendance: 6,424; Referee: Shin Yong-jun

8 November 2025 36	Jeonbuk Hyundai Motors	3–1	Daejeon Hana Citizen	Jeonju
	Song Min-kyu 57'; Lee Dong-jun 90'; Lee Seung-woo 90+7' (yellow card) 90+7'; Hong Jeong-Ho (yellow card) 60'; Park Jae-yong (yellow card) 69'; Kim Tae-hwan (yellow card) 80'	Report	Hernandes Rodrigues 75' (pen.) (yellow card) 82'; Yu Kang-hyun (yellow card) 1'	Stadium: Jeonju World Cup Stadium; Attendance: 23,160; Referee: Kim Woo-sung

22 November 2025 37	Pohang Steelers	0–0	Jeonbuk Hyundai Motors	Pohang
	Juninho Rocha (yellow card) 87'	Report		Stadium: Pohang Steel Yard; Attendance: 10,572; Referee: Park Byung-jin

30 November 2025 38	Jeonbuk Hyundai Motors	2–1	FC Seoul	Jeonju
	Lee Dong-jun 55'; Jeon Jin-woo 90+2' (pen.) (yellow card) 90+2'; Kim Tae-hyun (yellow card) 26'	Report	Park Su-il 59'; Jesse Lingard (yellow card) 90+6'	Stadium: Jeonju World Cup Stadium; Attendance: 21,742; Referee: Kim Chong-hyuk

Pos	Team	Pld	W	D	L	GF	GA	GD	Pts	Qualification or relegation (Note: Teams played each other three times (33 matches), before the league was split into two groups, the top six and the bottom six.)
1	Jeonbuk Hyundai Motors (C)	38	23	10	5	64	32	+32	79	Qualification for Champions League Elite league stage
2	Daejeon Hana Citizen	38	18	11	9	58	46	+12	65	Qualification for Champions League Elite league stage
3	Gimcheon Sangmu (Note: Military-owned team Gimcheon Sangmu cannot qualify for AFC competitions.)	38	18	7	13	59	45	+14	61	
4	Pohang Steelers	38	16	8	14	41	46	−5	56	Qualification for Champions League Elite league stage
5	Gangwon FC	38	13	13	12	37	41	−4	52	Qualification for Champions League Elite preliminary stage

Source: Soccerway K League
Rules for classification: 1) Points; 2) Goals scored; 3) Goal difference; 4) Wins; 5) Head-to-head points
(C) Champions

=== Korea Cup ===
16 April 2025 Round 3	Jeonbuk Hyundai Motors	3–0 (a.e.t.)	Ansan Greeners (K2)	Jeonju
	Andrea Compagno 105', 113'; Se-jin Jeon 119'			Stadium: Jeonju World Cup Stadium

14 May 2025 Round of 16	Daejeon Hana Citizen	2–3	Jeonbuk Hyundai Motors	Daejeon
	Kim In-gyun 89'; Joo Min-kyu 90+2'; (yellow card) 27'; Park Kyu-hyun (yellow card) 90+5'		Tiago Orobó 27'; Park Jin-seop 55' (yellow card) 57'; Andrea Compagno 74'; Hernandes Rodrigues (yellow card) 40' (yellow-red card) 78'; Yeon Je-woon (yellow card) 90+4'	Stadium: Daejeon World Cup Stadium

2 July 2025 Quarter Final	FC Seoul	0–1	Jeonbuk Hyundai Motors	Seoul
	Patryk Klimala (yellow card) 85'; Ryu Jae-moon (yellow card) 90'		Song Min-kyu 85'; Park Jin-seob (yellow card) 82'; Kwon Chang-hoon (yellow card) 83'; Kim Jeong-hoon (yellow card) 90+7'	Stadium: Seoul World Cup Stadium

20 August 2025 Semi Final Leg 1	Jeonbuk Hyundai Motors	1–1	Gangwon FC	Jeonju
19:00 UTC+9	Kim Yeong-bin 49' (yellow card) 6'		Ku Bon-cheol 62'; Kim Kang-gook (yellow card) 44'; Lee Gi-Hyuk (yellow card) 86'; Yun Il-Lok (yellow card) 88'	Stadium: Jeonju World Cup Stadium

27 August 2025 Semi Final Leg 2	Gangwon FC	1–2 (2–3 agg.)	Jeonbuk Hyundai Motors	Gangneung
19:00 UTC+9	Kim Dae-Woo 55'; (yellow card) 68'		Tiago Orobó 90+3' (pen.); Patrick Twumasi 90+10'; Kim Tae-hwan (yellow card) 50'; Jeon Jin-woo (yellow card) 64'; (yellow card) 68'	Stadium: Gangneung Stadium

4 December 2025 Final	Gwangju FC	1–2 (a.e.t.)	Jeonbuk Hyundai Motors	Seoul
	Hólmbert Friðjónsson 70'; Reis (yellow card) 38'; Byeon Jun-Soo (yellow card) 45+7'; Ju Se-Jong (yellow card) 45+8'; Cho Sung-Gwon (yellow card) 55' (yellow-red card) 101'		Lee Dong-jun 45+4'; Lee Seung-Woo 105+1' (red card) 106'; Yeon Je-Un (yellow card) 90+4'; Kim Tae-Hyun (yellow card) 105+1'; Tiago Orobó (yellow card) 119'; Jeon Jin-Woo (yellow card) 120'; Kim Jeong-Hoon (yellow card) 120+2'; João Gamboa (yellow card) 120+5'	Stadium: Seoul World Cup Stadium

=== 2024–25 AFC Champions League Two ===
==== Knockout stage ====
13 February 2025 R16 Leg 1	Port (Thailand)	0–4	(South Korea) Jeonbuk Hyundai Motors	Pathum Thani, Thailand
	Chaiyawat Buran (yellow card) 46'; Peeradol Chamrasamee (yellow card) 54'; Barros Tardeli (yellow card) 70'	Report	Park Jin-seop 19'; Andrea Compagno 24', 60'; Song Min-kyu 49'; Han Kook-young (yellow card) 44'; Kim Tae-hwan (yellow card) 45+4'	Stadium: BG Stadium (Note: Port played their home matches at Pathum Thani Stadium, Pathum Thani, instead of their regular home stadium PAT Stadium, Bangkok.); Attendance: 1,385; Referee: Abdulla Al-Marri (Qatar)

20 February 2025 R16 Leg 2	Jeonbuk Hyundai Motors (South Korea)	1–0 (5–0 agg.)	(Thailand) Port	Jeonju, South Korea
	Bak Jae-yong 4'	Report	Felipe Amorim (yellow card) 74'	Stadium: Jeonju World Cup Stadium; Attendance: 3,487; Referee: Ma Ning (China)

6 March 2025 QF Leg 1	Jeonbuk Hyundai Motors (South Korea)	0–2	(Australia) Sydney	Yongin, South Korea
		Report	Patryk Klimala 36', 66' (yellow card) 84'	Stadium: Yongin Mireu Stadium (Note: Jeonbuk Hyundai Motors played their home matches at Yongin Mireu Stadium, Yongin, instead of their regular home stadium Jeonju World Cup Stadium, Jeonju.); Attendance: 2,561; Referee: Asker Nadjafaliev (Uzbekistan)

13 March 2025 QF Leg 2	Sydney (Australia)	3–2 (5–2 agg.)	(South Korea) Jeonbuk Hyundai Motors	Sydney, Australia
	Alex Grant 59' (yellow card) 25'; Patryk Klimala 72'; Douglas Costa 82' (pen.); Anthony Caceres (yellow card) 45+1'; Rhyan Grant (yellow card) 74'	Report	Jeon Jin-woo 35', 45+3'	Stadium: Jubilee Stadium; Attendance: 7,039; Referee: Abdulla Al-Marri (Qatar)

== Team statistics ==
=== Appearances and goals ===
As of 6 December 25

No.	Pos.	Player	K-League		Korea Cup		2024–25 AFC Champions League Two		Total	
No.	Pos.	Player	Apps	Goals	Apps	Goals	Apps	Goals	Apps	Goals
1	GK	(South Korea) Kim Jeong-hoon	0	0	4	0	2	0	6	0
2	DF	(South Korea) Kim Young-bin	25+2	0	4	1	2+1	0	34	1
3	DF	(South Korea) Choi Woo-jin	5+7	0	0+1	0	0	0	13	0
4	DF	(South Korea) Park Jin-seop	35	3	5	1	4	1	44	5
5	MF	(Portugal) João Gamboa	4+9	0	0+3	0	0	0	16	0
6	MF	(South Korea) Maeng Seong-ung	3+1	0	0+1	0	0	0	5	0
7	MF	(South Korea) Lee Dong-jun	2+2	2	1	1	0	0	5	3
8	MF	(South Korea) Han Kook-young	5+11	0	0+1	0	3	0	20	0
9	FW	(Brazil) Tiago Orobó	12+17	9	4	2	1	0	34	11
10	MF	(South Korea) Song Min-kyu	32+2	5	2+1	1	2	1	39	7
11	FW	(South Korea) Lee Seung-woo	8+16	4	3+2	1	1+1	0	30	5
13	MF	(South Korea) Kang Sang-yoon	30+3	0	4+1	0	2+1	0	41	0
14	FW	(South Korea) Jeon Jin-woo	30+5	16	2+1	0	2+1	2	41	18
15	MF	(South Korea) Sung Jin-young	0	0	0	0	0	0	0	0
16	FW	(South Korea) Bak Jae-yong	5+8	1	0	0	2+1	1	16	2
17	MF	(South Korea) Jin Tae-Ho	0+11	0	1	0	0+1	0	13	0
18	DF	(South Korea) Lee Jun-ho	0	0	0	0	0	0	0	0
21	FW	(Ghana) Patrick Twumasi	0+4	0	0+1	1	0	0	5	1
22	MF	(South Korea) Kwon Chang-hoon	1+22	0	1+2	0	2+2	0	30	0
23	DF	(South Korea) Kim Tae-hwan	33+1	0	4	0	2	0	40	0
24	MF	(South Korea) Park Kyu-min	0	0	0	0	0	0	0	0
25	DF	(South Korea) Choi Chul-soon	8+1	0	1+2	0	3	0	15	0
26	DF	(South Korea) Hong Jeong-ho	29+1	1	2+2	0	0	0	34	1
27	FW	(South Korea) Lee Gyu-dong	0	0	0	0	0	0	0	0
28	MF	(South Korea) Lee Yeong-jae	9+23	2	3+1	0	3+1	0	40	2
31	GK	(South Korea) Song Bum-keun	36	0	1	0	2	0	39	0
33	MF	(South Korea) Jeon Byung-kwan	6+2	1	0	0	2+1	0	11	1
36	MF	(South Korea) Jang Nam-Ung	0	0	0	0	0	0	0	0
44	MF	(South Korea) Kim Ha-jun	1	0	1	0	0+1	0	3	0
47	MF	(South Korea) Yun Ju-Young	0	0	0	0	0	0	0	0
50	DF	(South Korea) Jin Si-woo	0	0	0	0	0	0	0	0
62	MF	(South Korea) Seo Jeong-Hyeok	0	0	0	0	0	0	0	0
63	MF	(South Korea) Han Seok-Jin	0	0	0	0	0	0	0	0
77	DF	(South Korea) Kim Tae-Hyun	26	0	4	0	3	0	33	0
81	GK	(South Korea) Jeon Ji-wan	0	0	0	0	0	0	0	0
91	GK	(South Korea) Gong Si-Hyeon	0	0	0	0	0	0	0	0
94	DF	(South Korea) Yeon Je-un	9+10	0	4	0	2+1	0	26	0
96	FW	(Italy) Andrea Compagno	20+6	13	1+3	1	2	2	32	16
97	MF	(South Korea) Kim Jin-gyu	30+4	4	2+2	0	2+2	0	42	4
99	MF	(South Korea) Kim Chang-hoon	0	0	0	0	0	0	0	0
Players featured on a match but left the club mid-season permanently
30	MF	(Brazil) Andrigo	0	0	0	0	0+1	0	1	0
71	FW	(South Korea) Han Kyo-won	0	0	0	0	0	0	0	0
Players featured on a match but left the club mid-season on loan transfer
3	DF	(South Korea) Jeong Tae-wook	0	0	0	0	0	0	0	0
6	MF	(South Korea) Lee Soo-bin	0	0	0	0	0	0	0	0
7	FW	(Brazil) Hernandes Rodrigues	1+2	0	1	0	0	0	4	0
19	MF	(Ghana) Nana Boateng	2+2	0	0	0	1+1	0	6	0
21	DF	(South Korea) Ahn Hyeon-beom	0+1	0	0	0	0+2	0	3	0
33	MF	(South Korea) Jeon Byung-kwan	0	0	0	0	0	0	0	0
42	MF	(Australia) (South Sudan) Joel Anasmo	0	0	0	0	0	0	0	0
