= Jeon Jin-woo =

South Korean footballer

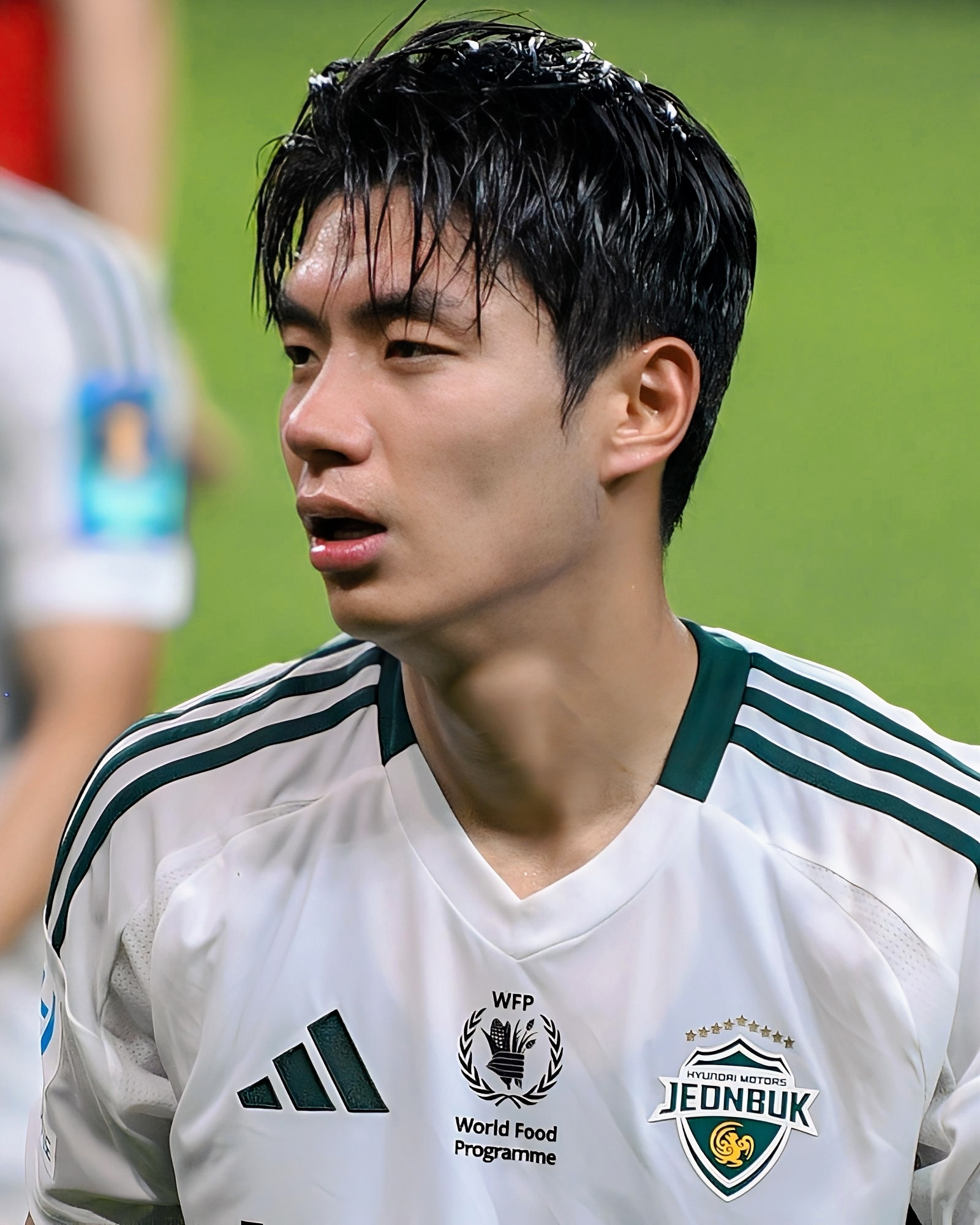
- Jeon in 2025

Personal information
- Birth name: Jeon Se-jin
- Date of birth: 9 September 1999 (age 27)
- Place of birth: Guri, South Korea
- Height: 1.82 m (6 ft 0 in)
- Position: Forward

Team information
- Current team: Oxford United
- Number: 7

Youth career
- Buyang Elementary School
- 2012–2017: Suwon Samsung Bluewings (Note: Played for Maetan Middle School from 2012 to 2014, and Maetan High School from 2015 to 2017, which were academies of Suwon Samsung Bluewings.)

Senior career*
Years	Team	Apps	(Gls)
2018–2024	Suwon Samsung Bluewings	102	(10)
2020–2021	→ Gimcheon Sangmu (draft)	2	(0)
2024–2025	Jeonbuk Hyundai Motors	48	(18)
2026–	Oxford United	7	(0)

International career^{‡}
2016	South Korea U17	5 (Note: Includes two appearances against non-national teams.)	(0)
2017–2019	South Korea U20	20	(7)
2019	South Korea U23	5	(0)
2025–	South Korea	2	(0)
Medal record
Men's football
Representing South Korea
FIFA U-20 World Cup
Runner-up	2019 Poland
AFC U-19 Championship
Runner-up	2018 Indonesia
- * Club domestic league appearances and goals as of 2 May 2026 ‡ National team caps and goals as of 10 June 2025

Jeon Jin-woo (Korean: 전진우; Hanja: 全晉旴; born 9 September 1999), formerly known as Jeon Se-jin (Korean: 전세진; Hanja: 全世珍), is a South Korean professional footballer who plays as a forward for EFL League One club Oxford United and the South Korea national team.

== Club career ==
Jeon won all three divisions of the Korean National School League, namely elementary, middle and high school divisions. He was also named the top goalscorer at the middle school division, and the Most Valuable Player at the high school division. He tried to participate in a tryout for Eredivisie club PSV Eindhoven prior to his graduation from Maetan High School, which had a youth football club of Suwon Samsung Bluewings, but withdrew his plan after being criticised by Suwon fans.

Jeon made his professional debut in an AFC Champions League qualifier against Thanh Hóa on 30 January 2018, and scored his first professional goal in a K League 1 match against Incheon United on 22 April. He helped Suwon win the 2019 Korean FA Cup before enlisting in military football club Sangju Sangmu (renamed Gimcheon Sangmu in 2021) to fulfill his military duty for one and a half years. He played in only two league matches for Sangmu due to a car accident. His long-term injury was followed by the stagnation of his development, and Suwon was relegated to the K League 2 after the 2023 season. On 9 July 2024, he transferred to Jeonbuk Hyundai Motors to mark a turning point in his career.

During the 2025 season, Jeon scored 15 goals in 24 appearances until June, and scored 4 goals in 20 appearances since July. He showed overwhelming performances in the first half of the season, which underlay Jeonbuk's Double, but was not able to receive any individual awards due to his slump in the second half.

On 20 January 2026, Jeon signed for EFL Championship club Oxford United. He played seven Championship matches without a goal for about three months before Oxford were relegated to the EFL League One.

== International career ==
Jeon led South Korea to a second-place finish by scoring five goals in six matches at the 2018 AFC U-19 Championship. He also participated in the 2019 FIFA U-20 World Cup, where South Korea finished second. He performed a key role at the AFC U-19 Championship, whereas he usually played as a substitute at the U-20 World Cup.

In a FIFA World Cup qualifier against Iraq on 5 June 2025, which ended in a 2–0 win, Jeon made his senior international debut and provided an assist.

== Career statistics ==
=== Club ===
As of 2 May 2026

Appearances and goals by club, season and competition
Club	Season	League			National cup (Note: Includes Korean FA Cup, FA Cup)		Continental		Other		Total	
Club	Season	Division	Apps	Goals	Apps	Goals	Apps	Goals	Apps	Goals	Apps	Goals
Suwon Samsung Bluewings	2018	K League 1	12	2	1	1	3 (Note: Appearances in AFC Champions League)	0	—		16	3
Suwon Samsung Bluewings	2019	K League 1	20	0	4	0	—		—		24	0
Suwon Samsung Bluewings	2021	K League 1	8	0	1	0	—		—		9	0
Suwon Samsung Bluewings	2022	K League 1	25	6	3	0	—		2 (Note: Appearances in K League promotion-relegation play-offs)	0	30	6
Suwon Samsung Bluewings	2023	K League 1	21	1	2	1	—		—		23	2
Suwon Samsung Bluewings	2024	K League 2	16	1	2	1	—		—		18	2
Suwon Samsung Bluewings	Total		102	10	13	3	3	0	2	0	120	13
Gimcheon Sangmu (draft)	2020	K League 1	1	0	0	0	—		—		1	0
Gimcheon Sangmu (draft)	2021	K League 2	1	0	1	0	—		—		2	0
Gimcheon Sangmu (draft)	Total		2	0	1	0	—		—		3	0
Jeonbuk Hyundai Motors	2024	K League 1	12	2	—		1 (Note: Appearances in AFC Champions League Two)	1	2	1	15	4
Jeonbuk Hyundai Motors	2025	K League 1	36	16	5	1	3	2	—		44	19
Jeonbuk Hyundai Motors	Total		48	18	5	1	4	3	2	1	59	23
Oxford United	2025–26	Championship	7	0	1	0	—		—		8	0
Career total			159	28	20	4	7	3	4	1	190	36

=== International ===
As of match played 10 June 2025

Appearances and goals by national team and year
National team	Year	Apps	Goals
South Korea	2025	2	0
Total		2	0

== Honours ==
Suwon Samsung Bluewings

- Korean FA Cup: 2019

Jeonbuk Hyundai Motors

- K League 1: 2025
- Korea Cup: 2025

South Korea U20

- FIFA U-20 World Cup runner-up: 2019
- AFC U-19 Championship runner-up: 2018

Individual

- Korean FA Young Player of the Year: 2018
- K League Player of the Month: April 2025, May 2025
- K League Goal of the Month: May 2025
- K League All-Star: 2025
