= 2026–27 AFC Champions League Elite league stage =

Football tournament group stage

The 2026–27 AFC Champions League Elite league stage began on 14 September 2026 and will end on 17 February 2027.

== Draw ==
The draw for the league stage was held on 18 August 2026 in Kuala Lumpur, Malaysia.

=== Seeding ===
For each region, teams will be seeded into four pots and each club will play two matches against the clubs from each pot.

Region	Pot 1	Pot 2	Pot 3	Pot 4
West Region	(Saudi Arabia) Al-Ahli (ACL); (United Arab Emirates) Al Ain (UAE 1); (Qatar) Al Sadd (QAT 1); (Iran) Esteghlal (IRN 1)	(Uzbekistan) Neftchi (UZB 1); (Iraq) Al-Quwa Al-Jawiya (IRQ 1); (Saudi Arabia) Al-Nassr (KSA 2); (United Arab Emirates) Shabab Al Ahli (UAE 2)	(Qatar) Al-Gharafa (QAT 2); (Iran) Tractor (IRN 2); (Saudi Arabia) Al-Hilal (KSA 3); (United Arab Emirates) Al Wasl (UAE 3)	(Qatar) Al-Shamal (QAT 3); (Saudi Arabia) Al-Qadsiah (KSA 4); (Saudi Arabia) Al-Ittihad (KSA 5)^{(PS)}; (Uzbekistan) Pakhtakor (UZB 2)^{(PS)}
East Region	(Japan) Kashima Antlers (JPN 1); (South Korea) Jeonbuk Hyundai Motors (KOR 1); (Thailand) Buriram United (THA 1); (China) Shanghai Port (CHN 1)	(Australia) Newcastle Jets (AUS 1); (Malaysia) Johor Darul Ta'zim (MAS 1); (Japan) Vissel Kobe (JPN 2); (South Korea) Daejeon Hana Citizen (KOR 2)	(Thailand) Port (THA 2); (China) Beijing Guoan (CHN 2); (Japan) Kashiwa Reysol (JPN 3); (South Korea) Pohang Steelers (KOR 3)	(Thailand) Ratchaburi (THA 3); (Japan) Kyoto Sanga (JPN 4); (Japan) Gamba Osaka (JPN 5)^{(PS)}; (Vietnam) Công An Hà Nội (VIE 1)^{(PS)}

=== Grid result ===
Each team is drawn a position in the draw grid for their region: column A–D for West and E–H for East. Teams from Pot 1 are drawn into positions 1, while teams from Pot 2 were drawn into positions 2, and so on.

Teams in each column play matches with their adjacent columns in each region. They play the teams on the right-hand side at home and the ones on the left-hand side away. Teams from the last column play teams from the first column at home, and teams from the first column play teams from the last column away.

Column	A	B	C	D	E	F	G	H
Number	West Region				East Region			
1	(United Arab Emirates) Al Ain	(Iran) Esteghlal	(Qatar) Al Sadd	(Saudi Arabia) Al-Ahli	(Thailand) Buriram United	(Japan) Kashima Antlers	(South Korea) Jeonbuk Hyundai Motors	(China) Shanghai Port
2	(United Arab Emirates) Shabab Al Ahli	(Saudi Arabia) Al-Nassr	(Uzbekistan) Neftchi	(Iraq) Al-Quwa Al-Jawiya	(South Korea) Daejeon Hana Citizen	(Japan) Vissel Kobe	(Australia) Newcastle Jets	(Malaysia) Johor Darul Ta'zim
3	(Qatar) Al-Gharafa	(Iran) Tractor	(United Arab Emirates) Al Wasl	(Saudi Arabia) Al-Hilal	(Thailand) Port	(China) Beijing Guoan	(South Korea) Pohang Steelers	(Japan) Kashiwa Reysol
4	(Uzbekistan) Pakhtakor	(Saudi Arabia) Al-Qadsiah	(Qatar) Al-Shamal	(Saudi Arabia) Al-Ittihad	(Vietnam) Công An Hà Nội	(Japan) Kyoto Sanga	(Thailand) Ratchaburi	(Japan) Gamba Osaka

== Schedule ==
The schedule of the league stage is as follows:

Round	Dates (West region)	Dates (East region)
Matchday 1	14–15 September 2026	15–16 September 2026
Matchday 2	12–13 October 2026	13–14 October 2026
Matchday 3	26–27 October 2026	27–28 October 2026
Matchday 4	2–3 November 2026	3–4 November 2026
Matchday 5	23–24 November 2026	24–25 November 2026
Matchday 6	7–8 December 2026	1–2 December 2026
Matchday 7	8–9 February 2027	9–10 February 2027
Matchday 8	15–16 February 2027	16–17 February 2027

== League stage ==
=== West Region ===
Pos	Team	Pld	W	D	L	GF	GA	GD	Pts	Qualification
1	(United Arab Emirates) Al Ain	4	4	0	0	14	3	+11	12	Advance to round of 16
2	(Saudi Arabia) Al-Hilal	4	3	0	1	7	4	+3	9	Advance to round of 16
3	(Iran) Esteghlal	4	3	0	1	6	3	+3	9	Advance to round of 16
4	(United Arab Emirates) Shabab Al Ahli	4	3	0	1	5	3	+2	9	Advance to round of 16
5	(Saudi Arabia) Al-Qadsiah	4	2	2	0	9	3	+6	8	Advance to round of 16
6	(Saudi Arabia) Al-Ahli	4	2	2	0	6	3	+3	8	Advance to round of 16
7	(Saudi Arabia) Al-Nassr	3	2	0	1	9	7	+2	6	Advance to round of 16
8	(Qatar) Al-Shamal	4	1	2	1	4	3	+1	5	Advance to round of 16
9	(Uzbekistan) Neftchi	4	1	1	2	5	7	−2	4	
10	(Saudi Arabia) Al-Ittihad	4	1	1	2	5	8	−3	4	
11	(United Arab Emirates) Al Wasl	3	1	0	2	6	8	−2	3	
12	(Iraq) Al-Quwa Al-Jawiya	4	1	0	3	5	9	−4	3	
13	(Iran) Tractor	4	0	2	2	3	5	−2	2	
14	(Uzbekistan) Pakhtakor	4	0	2	2	4	9	−5	2	
15	(Qatar) Al Sadd	4	0	2	2	1	6	−5	2	
16	(Qatar) Al-Gharafa	4	0	0	4	3	11	−8	0	

Updated to match(es) played on 3 November 2026. Source: AFC
Rules for classification: 1) points; 2) goal difference; 3) number of goals scored; 4) number of matches won; 5) penalty shoot-out if only two teams remain tied and played each other on the final matchday 6) fair play ranking; 7) drawing of lots

==== Results summary ====
Matchday 1
Home team	Score	Away team
Neftchi (Uzbekistan)	1–0	(Iraq) Al-Quwa Al-Jawiya
Shabab Al Ahli (United Arab Emirates)	1–0	(Iran) Tractor
Al-Shamal (Qatar)	1–1	(Saudi Arabia) Al-Ittihad
Al-Ahli (Saudi Arabia)	1–1	(Uzbekistan) Pakhtakor
Esteghlal (Iran)	3–0	(Qatar) Al Sadd
Al-Qadsiah (Saudi Arabia)	2–1	(United Arab Emirates) Al Wasl
Al Ain (United Arab Emirates)	4–0	(Saudi Arabia) Al-Nassr
Al-Hilal (Saudi Arabia)	2–1	(Qatar) Al-Gharafa

Matchday 2
Home team	Score	Away team
Pakhtakor (Uzbekistan)	1–1	(Saudi Arabia) Al-Qadsiah
Tractor (Iran)	0–0	(Qatar) Al-Shamal
Al Wasl (United Arab Emirates)	1–3	(Saudi Arabia) Al-Ahli
Al-Quwa Al-Jawiya (Iraq)	1–4	(United Arab Emirates) Al Ain
Al-Nassr (Saudi Arabia)	3–1	(Uzbekistan) Neftchi
Al-Gharafa (Qatar)	1–2	(Iran) Esteghlal
Al Sadd (Qatar)	0–2	(Saudi Arabia) Al-Hilal
Al-Ittihad (Saudi Arabia)	1–2	(United Arab Emirates) Shabab Al Ahli

Matchday 3
Home team	Score	Away team
Neftchi (Uzbekistan)	1–2	(Saudi Arabia) Al-Ittihad
Al-Ahli (Saudi Arabia)	2–1	(Qatar) Al-Gharafa
Al Ain (United Arab Emirates)	2–1	(Iran) Tractor
Al-Quwa Al-Jawiya (Iraq)	1–0	(Uzbekistan) Pakhtakor
Al-Qadsiah (Saudi Arabia)	1–1	(Qatar) Al Sadd
Shabab Al Ahli (United Arab Emirates)	2–0	(Iran) Esteghlal
Al-Shamal (Qatar)	3–1	(Saudi Arabia) Al-Hilal
Al-Nassr (Saudi Arabia)	27 Dec	(United Arab Emirates) Al Wasl

Matchday 4
Home team	Score	Away team
Pakhtakor (Uzbekistan)	2–6	(Saudi Arabia) Al-Nassr
Tractor (Iran)	2–2	(Uzbekistan) Neftchi
Al Wasl (United Arab Emirates)	4–3	(Iraq) Al-Quwa Al-Jawiya
Al Sadd (Qatar)	0–0	(Saudi Arabia) Al-Ahli
Al-Ittihad (Saudi Arabia)	1–4	(United Arab Emirates) Al Ain
Al-Gharafa (Qatar)	0–5	(Saudi Arabia) Al-Qadsiah
Esteghlal (Iran)	1–0	(Qatar) Al-Shamal
Al-Hilal (Saudi Arabia)	2–0	(United Arab Emirates) Shabab Al Ahli

Matchday 5
Home team	Score	Away team
Neftchi (Uzbekistan)	v	(Saudi Arabia) Al-Hilal
Al Ain (United Arab Emirates)	v	(Iran) Esteghlal
Tractor (Iran)	v	(United Arab Emirates) Al Wasl
Al-Shamal (Qatar)	v	(Saudi Arabia) Al-Ahli
Al-Ittihad (Saudi Arabia)	v	(Uzbekistan) Pakhtakor
Al-Quwa Al-Jawiya (Iraq)	v	(Qatar) Al-Gharafa
Shabab Al Ahli (United Arab Emirates)	v	(Saudi Arabia) Al-Qadsiah
Al-Nassr (Saudi Arabia)	v	(Qatar) Al Sadd

Matchday 6
Home team	Score	Away team
Pakhtakor (Uzbekistan)	v	(Iran) Tractor
Al Wasl (United Arab Emirates)	v	(Saudi Arabia) Al-Ittihad
Al-Qadsiah (Saudi Arabia)	v	(Qatar) Al-Shamal
Esteghlal (Iran)	v	(Uzbekistan) Neftchi
Al-Hilal (Saudi Arabia)	v	(United Arab Emirates) Al Ain
Al Sadd (Qatar)	v	(Iraq) Al-Quwa Al-Jawiya
Al-Gharafa (Qatar)	v	(Saudi Arabia) Al-Nassr
Al-Ahli (Saudi Arabia)	v	(United Arab Emirates) Shabab Al Ahli

Matchday 7
Home team	Score	Away team
Pakhtakor (Uzbekistan)	v	(Iran) Esteghlal
Tractor (Iran)	v	(Qatar) Al Sadd
Al Ain (United Arab Emirates)	v	(Saudi Arabia) Al-Qadsiah
Al-Quwa Al-Jawiya (Iraq)	v	(United Arab Emirates) Shabab Al Ahli
Al-Nassr (Saudi Arabia)	v	(Qatar) Al-Shamal
Al-Ittihad (Saudi Arabia)	v	(Qatar) Al-Gharafa
Neftchi (Uzbekistan)	v	(Saudi Arabia) Al-Ahli
Al Wasl (United Arab Emirates)	v	(Saudi Arabia) Al-Hilal

Matchday 8
Home team	Score	Away team
Al-Ahli (Saudi Arabia)	v	(United Arab Emirates) Al Ain
Al Sadd (Qatar)	v	(Saudi Arabia) Al-Ittihad
Esteghlal (Iran)	v	(United Arab Emirates) Al Wasl
Shabab Al Ahli (United Arab Emirates)	v	(Saudi Arabia) Al-Nassr
Al-Gharafa (Qatar)	v	(Iran) Tractor
Al-Hilal (Saudi Arabia)	v	(Uzbekistan) Pakhtakor
Al-Shamal (Qatar)	v	(Iraq) Al-Quwa Al-Jawiya
Al-Qadsiah (Saudi Arabia)	v	(Uzbekistan) Neftchi

==== Matches ====
===== Matchday 1 =====
14 September 2026
18:45 UTC+5

Neftchi (Uzbekistan)	1–0	(Iraq) Al-Quwa Al-Jawiya
Marušić 83'	Report

Istiqlol Stadium, Fergana
Attendance: 17,250
Referee: Adel Al-Naqbi (United Arab Emirates)

14 September 2026
20:00 UTC+4

Shabab Al Ahli (United Arab Emirates)	1–0	(Iran) Tractor
César 23'	Report

Rashid Stadium, Dubai
Attendance: 1,293
Referee: Adham Makhadmeh (Jordan)

14 September 2026
19:00 UTC+3

Al-Shamal (Qatar)	1–1	(Saudi Arabia) Al-Ittihad
Bounedjah 63'	Report	Wijnaldum 90+4'

Al Bayt Stadium, Al Khor
Attendance: 4,069
Referee: Ahmad Al-Ali (Kuwait)

14 September 2026
21:15 UTC+3

Al-Ahli (Saudi Arabia)	1–1	(Uzbekistan) Pakhtakor
Al-Buraikan 90+3'	Report	Flamarion 86'

King Abdullah Sports City Stadium, Jeddah
Attendance: 15,145
Referee: Abdullah Jamali (Kuwait)

14 September 2026
21:15 UTC+3

Esteghlal (Iran)	3–0	(Qatar) Al Sadd
Asani 9'; Saharkhizan 47'; Gholizadeh 90+5'	Report

Basra International Stadium, Basra (Iraq) (Note: Esteghlal played their home match at Basra International Stadium in Basra, Iraq, instead of their regular home ground, the Azadi Stadium in Tehran, Iran, due to the 2025–2026 Iranian protesters massacres and 2026 Iran war.)
Attendance: 7,892
Referee: Qasim Al-Hatmi (Oman)

14 September 2026
21:15 UTC+3

Al-Qadsiah (Saudi Arabia)	2–1	(United Arab Emirates) Al Wasl
Quiñones 57'; Retegui 61'	Report	Spadacio 90+6'

Prince Mohamed bin Fahd Stadium, Dammam
Attendance: 7,013
Referee: Zaid Thamer Mohammed (Iraq)

15 September 2026
20:00 UTC+4

Al Ain (United Arab Emirates)	4–0	(Saudi Arabia) Al-Nassr
H. Rahimi 25', 63'; S. Rahimi 72'; Giakoumakis 85'	Report

Hazza bin Zayed Stadium, Al Ain
Attendance: 17,433
Referee: Ilgiz Tantashev (Uzbekistan)

15 September 2026
21:15 UTC+3

Al-Hilal (Saudi Arabia)	2–1	(Qatar) Al-Gharafa
Neves 45+3' (pen.); Milinković-Savić 73'	Report	Hassan 90+2'

Kingdom Arena, Riyadh
Attendance: 20,140
Referee: Omar Al-Ali (United Arab Emirates)

===== Matchday 2 =====
12 October 2026
18:45 UTC+5

Pakhtakor (Uzbekistan)	1–1	(Saudi Arabia) Al-Qadsiah
Khamdamov 89' (pen.)	Report	Reijnders 35'

Pakhtakor Central Stadium, Tashkent
Attendance: 2,650
Referee: Choi Hyun-jai (South Korea)

12 October 2026
20:00 UTC+4

Tractor (Iran)	0–0	(Qatar) Al-Shamal
	Report

Sultan Qaboos Sports Complex, Muscat (Oman) (Note: Tractor played their home match at the Sultan Qaboos Sports Complex in Muscat, Oman, instead of their regular home ground, the Sahand Stadium in Tabriz, Iran, due to the 2025–2026 Iranian protesters massacres and 2026 Iran war.)
Attendance: 750
Referee: Nazmi Nasaruddin (Malaysia)

12 October 2026
20:00 UTC+4

Al Wasl (United Arab Emirates)	1–3	(Saudi Arabia) Al-Ahli
Malheiro 45+3'	Report	Ibañez 20'; Trincão 58'; Al-Buraikan 90+1'

Zabeel Stadium, Dubai
Attendance: 6,585
Referee: Abdulrahman Al-Jassim (Qatar)

12 October 2026
21:15 UTC+3

Al-Quwa Al-Jawiya (Iraq)	1–4	(United Arab Emirates) Al Ain
Jawad 89'	Report	Kaku 13'; Al-Rosan 18' (o.g.); H. Rahimi 23', 43'

Basra International Stadium, Basra (Note: Al-Quwa Al-Jawiya played their home match at the Basra International Stadium in Basra, instead of their regular home ground, the Al-Madina Stadium in Baghdad, which did not meet AFC requirements.)
Attendance: 4,762
Referee: Jin Jingyuan (China)

12 October 2026
21:15 UTC+3

Al-Gharafa (Qatar)	1–2	(Iran) Esteghlal
Sassi 48'	Report	Asani 37'; Goudarzi 60'

Thani bin Jassim Stadium, Al Gharrafa
Attendance: 2,783
Referee: Alex King (Australia)

12 October 2026
22:15 UTC+3

Al-Nassr (Saudi Arabia)	3–1	(Uzbekistan) Neftchi
Ângelo 33'; C. Ronaldo 42'; Gofurov 78' (o.g.)	Report	Odilov 51'

King Saud University Stadium, Riyadh
Attendance: 7,108
Referee: Ma Ning (China)

13 October 2026
19:00 UTC+3

Al Sadd (Qatar)	0–2	(Saudi Arabia) Al-Hilal
	Report	Watkins 40'; Neves 65' (pen.)

Jassim bin Hamad Stadium, Al Rayyan
Attendance: 11,223
Referee: Yusuke Araki (Japan)

13 October 2026
21:15 UTC+3

Al-Ittihad (Saudi Arabia)	1–2	(United Arab Emirates) Shabab Al Ahli
Ríos 66'	Report	Azmoun 7', 16'

King Abdullah Sports City Stadium, Jeddah
Attendance: 26,515
Referee: Ilgiz Tantashev (Uzbekistan)

===== Matchday 3 =====
26 October 2026
18:45 UTC+5

Neftchi (Uzbekistan)	1–2	(Saudi Arabia) Al-Ittihad
Iskanderov 17' (pen.)	Report	Aouar 34'; En-Nesyri 90+1'

Istiqlol Stadium, Fergana
Attendance: 17,250
Referee: Adham Makhadmeh (Jordan)

26 October 2026
19:00 UTC+3

Al-Ahli (Saudi Arabia)	2–1	(Qatar) Al-Gharafa
Toney 4'; Gonçalves 86'	Report	F. Coman 53'

King Abdullah Sports City Stadium, Jeddah
Attendance: 7,998
Referee: Ma Ning (China)

26 October 2026
20:00 UTC+4

Al Ain (United Arab Emirates)	2–1	(Iran) Tractor
Rabia 21'; H. Rahimi 70'	Report	Halilović 55'

Hazza bin Zayed Stadium, Al Ain
Attendance: 8,177
Referee: Abdullah Jamali (Kuwait)

26 October 2026
21:15 UTC+3

Al-Quwa Al-Jawiya (Iraq)	1–0	(Uzbekistan) Pakhtakor
Abdul-Amir 70'	Report

Al-Madina International Stadium, Baghdad
Attendance: 4,372
Referee: Salman Falahi (Qatar)

26 October 2026
21:15 UTC+3

Al-Qadsiah (Saudi Arabia)	1–1	(Qatar) Al Sadd
Quiñones 84'	Report	Afif 74'

Prince Mohamed bin Fahd Stadium, Dammam
Attendance: 7,812
Referee: Omar Al-Ali (United Arab Emirates)

27 October 2026
20:00 UTC+4

Shabab Al Ahli (United Arab Emirates)	2–0	(Iran) Esteghlal
Mateusão 69'; Alvina 84'	Report

Rashid Stadium, Dubai
Attendance: 2,725
Referee: Khalid Al-Turais (Saudi Arabia)

27 October 2026
21:15 UTC+3

Al-Shamal (Qatar)	3–1	(Saudi Arabia) Al-Hilal
Saïd 8'; Bounedjah 48'; Romdhane 54'	Report	Al-Dawsari 32'

Al Bayt Stadium, Al Khor
Attendance: 6,283
Referee: Qasim Al-Hatmi (Oman)

27 December 2026
19:00 UTC+3

Al-Nassr (Saudi Arabia)	v	(United Arab Emirates) Al Wasl
	Report

King Saud University Stadium, Riyadh

===== Matchday 4 =====
2 November 2026
18:45 UTC+5

Pakhtakor (Uzbekistan)	2–6	(Saudi Arabia) Al-Nassr
Flamarion 36'; Khamdamov 75'	Report	Al-Hamdan 15'; João Félix 17', 32'; Al-Amri 53'; Ghareeb 62'; Ângelo 79'

Pakhtakor Central Stadium, Tashkent
Attendance: 28,153
Referee: Alex King (Australia)

2 November 2026
20:00 UTC+4

Tractor (Iran)	2–2	(Uzbekistan) Neftchi
Štrkalj 82'; Kasemayn 90+9'	Report	Perica 55'; Jovović 90+4'

Sultan Qaboos Sports Complex, Muscat (Oman)
Attendance: 1,244
Referee: Choi Hyun-jai (South Korea)

2 November 2026
20:00 UTC+4

Al Wasl (United Arab Emirates)	4–3	(Iraq) Al-Quwa Al-Jawiya
Taremi 6'; Giménez 17' (pen.), 67'; Malheiro 45+1'	Report	Hatem 21'; Jouini 55'; Mohammed 80'

Zabeel Stadium, Dubai
Attendance: 1,059
Referee: Majed Al-Shamrani (Saudi Arabia)

2 November 2026
19:00 UTC+3

Al Sadd (Qatar)	0–0	(Saudi Arabia) Al-Ahli
	Report

Jassim bin Hamad Stadium, Al Rayyan
Attendance: 7,913
Referee: Ilgiz Tantashev (Uzbekistan)

2 November 2026
21:15 UTC+3

Al-Ittihad (Saudi Arabia)	1–4	(United Arab Emirates) Al Ain
Al-Sahafi 53'	Report	Kaku 17'; R. Rodrigues 42'; Simić 58' (o.g.); Palacios 90' (pen.)

King Abdullah Sports City Stadium, Jeddah
Attendance: 34,090
Referee: Abdulrahman Al-Jassim (Qatar)

2 November 2026
21:15 UTC+3

Al-Gharafa (Qatar)	0–5	(Saudi Arabia) Al-Qadsiah
	Report	Al-Shamat 17'; Quiñones 26', 45'; Al-Shahrani 43'; al-Qahtani 81'

Thani bin Jassim Stadium, Al Gharrafa
Attendance: 430
Referee: Kim Jong-hyeok (South Korea)

3 November 2026
19:00 UTC+3

Esteghlal (Iran)	1–0	(Qatar) Al-Shamal
Asani 90+1'	Report

Basra International Stadium, Basra (Iraq)
Attendance: 7,121
Referee: Asker Nadjafaliev (Uzbekistan)

3 November 2026
21:15 UTC+3

Al-Hilal (Saudi Arabia)	2–0	(United Arab Emirates) Shabab Al Ahli
Watkins 6', 46'	Report

Kingdom Arena, Riyadh
Attendance: 17,855
Referee: Adham Makhadmeh (Jordan)

===== Matchday 5 =====
23 November 2026
18:45 UTC+5

Neftchi (Uzbekistan)	v	(Saudi Arabia) Al-Hilal

Istiqlol Stadium, Fergana

23 November 2026
20:00 UTC+4

Al Ain (United Arab Emirates)	v	(Iran) Esteghlal

Hazza bin Zayed Stadium, Al Ain

23 November 2026
20:00 UTC+4

Tractor (Iran)	v	(United Arab Emirates) Al Wasl

Sultan Qaboos Sports Complex, Muscat (Oman)

23 November 2026
19:00 UTC+3

Al-Shamal (Qatar)	v	(Saudi Arabia) Al-Ahli

Al Bayt Stadium, Al Khor

23 November 2026
21:15 UTC+3

Al-Ittihad (Saudi Arabia)	v	(Uzbekistan) Pakhtakor

King Abdullah Sports City Stadium, Jeddah

23 November 2026
21:15 UTC+3

Al-Quwa Al-Jawiya (Iraq)	v	(Qatar) Al-Gharafa

Basra International Stadium, Basra

24 November 2026
20:00 UTC+4

Shabab Al Ahli (United Arab Emirates)	v	(Saudi Arabia) Al-Qadsiah

Rashid Stadium, Dubai

24 November 2026
21:15 UTC+3

Al-Nassr (Saudi Arabia)	v	(Qatar) Al Sadd

King Saud University Stadium, Riyadh

===== Matchday 6 =====
7 December 2026
18:45 UTC+5

Pakhtakor (Uzbekistan)	v	(Iran) Tractor

Pakhtakor Central Stadium, Tashkent

7 December 2026
20:00 UTC+4

Al Wasl (United Arab Emirates)	v	(Saudi Arabia) Al-Ittihad

Zabeel Stadium, Dubai

7 December 2026
19:00 UTC+3

Al-Qadsiah (Saudi Arabia)	v	(Qatar) Al-Shamal

Prince Mohamed bin Fahd Stadium, Dammam

7 December 2026
21:15 UTC+3

Esteghlal (Iran)	v	(Uzbekistan) Neftchi

Basra International Stadium, Basra (Iraq)

7 December 2026
21:15 UTC+3

Al-Hilal (Saudi Arabia)	v	(United Arab Emirates) Al Ain

Kingdom Arena, Riyadh

7 December 2026
21:15 UTC+3

Al Sadd (Qatar)	v	(Iraq) Al-Quwa Al-Jawiya

Jassim bin Hamad Stadium, Al Rayyan

8 December 2026
19:00 UTC+3

Al-Gharafa (Qatar)	v	(Saudi Arabia) Al-Nassr

Thani bin Jassim Stadium, Al Gharrafa

8 December 2026
21:15 UTC+3

Al-Ahli (Saudi Arabia)	v	(United Arab Emirates) Shabab Al Ahli

Prince Abdullah Al-Faisal Sports City Stadium, Jeddah

===== Matchday 7 =====
8 February 2027
18:45 UTC+5

Pakhtakor (Uzbekistan)	v	(Iran) Esteghlal

Pakhtakor Central Stadium, Tashkent

8 February 2027
20:00 UTC+4

Tractor (Iran)	v	(Qatar) Al Sadd

Sultan Qaboos Sports Complex, Muscat (Oman)

8 February 2027
20:00 UTC+4

Al Ain (United Arab Emirates)	v	(Saudi Arabia) Al-Qadsiah

Hazza bin Zayed Stadium, Al Ain

8 February 2027
21:15 UTC+3

Al-Quwa Al-Jawiya (Iraq)	v	(United Arab Emirates) Shabab Al Ahli

Basra International Stadium, Basra

8 February 2027
21:15 UTC+3

Al-Nassr (Saudi Arabia)	v	(Qatar) Al-Shamal

King Saud University Stadium, Riyadh

8 February 2027
21:15 UTC+3

Al-Ittihad (Saudi Arabia)	v	(Qatar) Al-Gharafa

King Abdullah Sports City Stadium, Jeddah

9 February 2027
18:45 UTC+5

Neftchi (Uzbekistan)	v	(Saudi Arabia) Al-Ahli

Istiqlol Stadium, Fergana

9 February 2027
20:00 UTC+4

Al Wasl (United Arab Emirates)	v	(Saudi Arabia) Al-Hilal

Zabeel Stadium, Dubai

===== Matchday 8 =====
15 February 2027
21:15 UTC+3

Al-Ahli (Saudi Arabia)	v	(United Arab Emirates) Al Ain

King Abdullah Sports City Stadium, Jeddah

15 February 2027
21:15 UTC+3

Al Sadd (Qatar)	v	(Saudi Arabia) Al-Ittihad

Jassim bin Hamad Stadium, Al Rayyan

15 February 2027
21:15 UTC+3

Esteghlal (Iran)	v	(United Arab Emirates) Al Wasl

Basra International Stadium, Basra (Iraq)

15 February 2027
22:15 UTC+4

Shabab Al Ahli (United Arab Emirates)	v	(Saudi Arabia) Al-Nassr

Rashid Stadium, Dubai

15 February 2027
21:15 UTC+3

Al-Gharafa (Qatar)	v	(Iran) Tractor

Thani bin Jassim Stadium, Al Gharrafa

15 February 2027
21:15 UTC+3

Al-Hilal (Saudi Arabia)	v	(Uzbekistan) Pakhtakor

Kingdom Arena, Riyadh

15 February 2027
21:15 UTC+3

Al-Shamal (Qatar)	v	(Iraq) Al-Quwa Al-Jawiya

Al Bayt Stadium, Al Khor

15 February 2027
21:15 UTC+3

Al-Qadsiah (Saudi Arabia)	v	(Uzbekistan) Neftchi

Prince Mohamed bin Fahd Stadium, Dammam

=== East Region ===
Pos	Team	Pld	W	D	L	GF	GA	GD	Pts	Qualification
1	(Japan) Vissel Kobe	4	4	0	0	8	3	+5	12	Advance to round of 16
2	(Japan) Kashima Antlers	4	3	1	0	11	1	+10	10	Advance to round of 16
3	(Japan) Gamba Osaka	4	2	2	0	11	6	+5	8	Advance to round of 16
4	(Japan) Kashiwa Reysol	4	2	1	1	8	3	+5	7	Advance to round of 16
5	(China) Shanghai Port	4	2	1	1	13	10	+3	7	Advance to round of 16
6	(Japan) Kyoto Sanga	4	2	1	1	6	3	+3	7	Advance to round of 16
6	(Malaysia) Johor Darul Ta'zim	4	2	1	1	6	3	+3	7	Advance to round of 16
8	(South Korea) Jeonbuk Hyundai Motors	4	2	1	1	6	5	+1	7	Advance to round of 16
9	(China) Beijing Guoan	4	2	1	1	10	10	0	7	
10	(South Korea) Daejeon Hana Citizen	4	1	1	2	2	4	−2	4	
11	(Vietnam) Công An Hà Nội	4	1	1	2	4	7	−3	4	
12	(Thailand) Buriram United	4	0	3	1	2	3	−1	3	
13	(Thailand) Port	4	1	0	3	9	14	−5	3	
14	(Thailand) Ratchaburi	4	0	1	3	6	10	−4	1	
15	(South Korea) Pohang Steelers	4	0	1	3	4	11	−7	1	
16	(Australia) Newcastle Jets	4	0	0	4	6	19	−13	0	

Updated to match(es) played on 4 November 2026. Source: AFC
Rules for classification: 1) points; 2) goal difference; 3) number of goals scored; 4) number of matches won; 5) penalty shoot-out if only two teams remain tied and played each other on the final matchday 6) fair play ranking; 7) drawing of lots

==== Results summary ====
Matchday 1
Home team	Score	Away team
Kashima Antlers (Japan)	7–1	(Australia) Newcastle Jets
Daejeon Hana Citizen (South Korea)	1–0	(Japan) Kyoto Sanga
Gamba Osaka (Japan)	4–1	(Vietnam) Công An Hà Nội
Ratchaburi (Thailand)	4–6	(China) Shanghai Port
Johor Darul Ta'zim (Malaysia)	1–1	(Thailand) Buriram United
Beijing Guoan (China)	3–1	(South Korea) Pohang Steelers
Jeonbuk Hyundai Motors (South Korea)	2–1	(Japan) Kashiwa Reysol
Port (Thailand)	1–2	(Japan) Vissel Kobe

Matchday 2
Home team	Score	Away team
Newcastle Jets (Australia)	1–3	(Japan) Gamba Osaka
Kyoto Sanga (Japan)	1–0	(Thailand) Ratchaburi
Pohang Steelers (South Korea)	0–2	(Malaysia) Johor Darul Ta'zim
Shanghai Port (China)	1–1	(South Korea) Daejeon Hana Citizen
Buriram United (Thailand)	0–1	(China) Beijing Guoan
Công An Hà Nội (Vietnam)	0–1	(Japan) Kashima Antlers
Vissel Kobe (Japan)	2–0	(South Korea) Jeonbuk Hyundai Motors
Kashiwa Reysol (Japan)	5–1	(Thailand) Port

Matchday 3
Home team	Score	Away team
Shanghai Port (China)	2–3	(Vietnam) Công An Hà Nội
Johor Darul Ta'zim (Malaysia)	3–0	(Thailand) Port
Daejeon Hana Citizen (South Korea)	0–1	(Japan) Vissel Kobe
Kyoto Sanga (Japan)	5–2	(Australia) Newcastle Jets
Beijing Guoan (China)	2–2	(South Korea) Jeonbuk Hyundai Motors
Ratchaburi (Thailand)	0–0	(Japan) Kashiwa Reysol
Kashima Antlers (Japan)	3–0	(South Korea) Pohang Steelers
Gamba Osaka (Japan)	1–1	(Thailand) Buriram United

Matchday 4
Home team	Score	Away team
Newcastle Jets (Australia)	2–4	(China) Shanghai Port
Jeonbuk Hyundai Motors (South Korea)	2–0	(Malaysia) Johor Darul Ta'zim
Vissel Kobe (Japan)	3–2	(Thailand) Ratchaburi
Kashiwa Reysol (Japan)	2–0	(South Korea) Daejeon Hana Citizen
Port (Thailand)	7–4	(China) Beijing Guoan
Công An Hà Nội (Vietnam)	0–0	(Japan) Kyoto Sanga
Pohang Steelers (South Korea)	3–3	(Japan) Gamba Osaka
Buriram United (Thailand)	0–0	(Japan) Kashima Antlers

Matchday 5
Home team	Score	Away team
Newcastle Jets (Australia)	v	(Japan) Kashiwa Reysol
Daejeon Hana Citizen (South Korea)	v	(China) Beijing Guoan
Kyoto Sanga (Japan)	v	(South Korea) Pohang Steelers
Shanghai Port (China)	v	(Thailand) Buriram United
Ratchaburi (Thailand)	v	(Malaysia) Johor Darul Ta'zim
Công An Hà Nội (Vietnam)	v	(Japan) Vissel Kobe
Kashima Antlers (Japan)	v	(South Korea) Jeonbuk Hyundai Motors
Gamba Osaka (Japan)	v	(Thailand) Port

Matchday 6
Home team	Score	Away team
Vissel Kobe (Japan)	v	(Australia) Newcastle Jets
Kashiwa Reysol (Japan)	v	(Vietnam) Công An Hà Nội
Pohang Steelers (South Korea)	v	(China) Shanghai Port
Johor Darul Ta'zim (Malaysia)	v	(South Korea) Daejeon Hana Citizen
Beijing Guoan (China)	v	(Thailand) Ratchaburi
Buriram United (Thailand)	v	(Japan) Kyoto Sanga
Jeonbuk Hyundai Motors (South Korea)	v	(Japan) Gamba Osaka
Port (Thailand)	v	(Japan) Kashima Antlers

Matchday 7
Home team	Score	Away team
Newcastle Jets (Australia)	v	(Malaysia) Johor Darul Ta'zim
Shanghai Port (China)	v	(Thailand) Port
Daejeon Hana Citizen (South Korea)	v	(Japan) Kashima Antlers
Kyoto Sanga (Japan)	v	(South Korea) Jeonbuk Hyundai Motors
Ratchaburi (Thailand)	v	(Japan) Gamba Osaka
Công An Hà Nội (Vietnam)	v	(China) Beijing Guoan
Vissel Kobe (Japan)	v	(South Korea) Pohang Steelers
Kashiwa Reysol (Japan)	v	(Thailand) Buriram United

Matchday 8
Home team	Score	Away team
Kashima Antlers (Japan)	v	(Thailand) Ratchaburi
Jeonbuk Hyundai Motors (South Korea)	v	(China) Shanghai Port
Buriram United (Thailand)	v	(Japan) Vissel Kobe
Johor Darul Ta'zim (Malaysia)	v	(Vietnam) Công An Hà Nội
Port (Thailand)	v	(Japan) Kyoto Sanga
Beijing Guoan (China)	v	(Australia) Newcastle Jets
Gamba Osaka (Japan)	v	(South Korea) Daejeon Hana Citizen
Pohang Steelers (South Korea)	v	(Japan) Kashiwa Reysol

==== Matches ====
===== Matchday 1 =====
15 September 2026
19:00 UTC+9

Kashima Antlers (Japan)	7–1	(Australia) Newcastle Jets
Čavrić 11', 16', 42'; Delianov 19' (o.g.); Tokuda 40', 56'; Tagawa 73'	Report	Wood 79'

Kashima Soccer Stadium, Kashima
Attendance: 5,761
Referee: Khalid Al-Turais (Saudi Arabia)

15 September 2026
19:00 UTC+9

Daejeon Hana Citizen (South Korea)	1–0	(Japan) Kyoto Sanga
Bobsin 78'	Report

Daejeon World Cup Stadium, Daejeon
Attendance: 7,998
Referee: Alex King (Australia)

15 September 2026
19:00 UTC+9

Gamba Osaka (Japan)	4–1	(Vietnam) Công An Hà Nội
Usami 29', 67'; Toshida 58'; Sumi 90+3'	Report	Perea 79'

Suita City Football Stadium, Suita
Attendance: 8,800
Referee: Asker Nadjafaliev (Uzbekistan)

15 September 2026
17:00 UTC+7

Ratchaburi (Thailand)	4–6	(China) Shanghai Port
Rakotoharimalala 71', 84', 90+5'; Ekanit 90+6'	Report	Ampem 31', 36', 45+1'; Wu Lei 51'; Grau 86'; Leonardo 90+7'

Ratchaburi Stadium, Ratchaburi
Attendance: 2,974
Referee: Kim Jong-hyeok (South Korea)

15 September 2026
20:15 UTC+8

Johor Darul Ta'zim (Malaysia)	1–1	(Thailand) Buriram United
Arribas 26'	Report	Schimmer 43'

Sultan Ibrahim Stadium, Iskandar Puteri
Attendance: 32,325
Referee: Majed Al-Shamrani (Saudi Arabia)

15 September 2026
20:15 UTC+8

Beijing Guoan (China)	3–1	(South Korea) Pohang Steelers
Akolo 2'; Zhang Xizhe 12'; Dudziak 46'	Report	Tranziska 6' (pen.)

Workers' Stadium, Beijing
Attendance: 27,999
Referee: Abdulrahman Al-Jassim (Qatar)

16 September 2026
19:00 UTC+9

Jeonbuk Hyundai Motors (South Korea)	2–1	(Japan) Kashiwa Reysol
T. Orobó 48'; Italo 69'	Report	Yuba 30'

Jeonju World Cup Stadium, Jeonju
Attendance: 4,694
Referee: Alireza Faghani (Australia)

16 September 2026
19:15 UTC+7

Port (Thailand)	1–2	(Japan) Vissel Kobe
Komatsu 45+4' (o.g.)	Report	Komatsu 10'; Muto 61'

Thammasat Stadium, Pathum Thani (Note: Port played their home match at the Thammasat Stadium and Pathum Thani Stadium in Pathum Thani, instead of their regular home ground, the PAT Stadium in Bangkok, which did not meet AFC requirements.)
Attendance: 1,779
Referee: Choi Hyun-jai (South Korea)

===== Matchday 2 =====
13 October 2026
18:45 UTC+11

Newcastle Jets (Australia)	1−3	(Japan) Gamba Osaka
Vergos 32'	Report	Toshida 40'; Hümmet 73'; Welton 86'

Newcastle International Sports Centre, Newcastle
Attendance: 3,219
Referee: Ahmad Al-Ali (Kuwait)

13 October 2026
19:00 UTC+9

Kyoto Sanga (Japan)	1–0	(Thailand) Ratchaburi
Matsuda 88'	Report

Sanga Stadium by Kyocera, Kameoka
Attendance: 4,582
Referee: Qasim Al-Hatmi (Oman)

13 October 2026
19:00 UTC+9

Pohang Steelers (South Korea)	0–2	(Malaysia) Johor Darul Ta'zim
	Report	M. Guilherme 49', 89'

Pohang Steel Yard, Pohang
Attendance: 2,594
Referee: Adham Makhadmeh (Jordan)

13 October 2026
18:00 UTC+8

Shanghai Port (China)	1–1	(South Korea) Daejeon Hana Citizen
Ampem 49'	Report	Diogo de Oliveira 54'

Pudong Football Stadium, Shanghai
Attendance: 12,013
Referee: Mohammed Al-Hoish (Saudi Arabia)

13 October 2026
19:15 UTC+7

Buriram United (Thailand)	0−1	(China) Beijing Guoan
	Report	Abreu 88'

Buriram Stadium, Buriram
Attendance: 24,380
Referee: Alireza Faghani (Australia)

13 October 2026
19:15 UTC+7

Công An Hà Nội (Vietnam)	0−1	(Japan) Kashima Antlers
	Report	Nguyễn Adou Leygley Minh 61' (o.g.)

Hàng Đẫy Stadium, Hanoi
Attendance: 5,168
Referee: Mooud Bonyadifard (Iran)

14 October 2026
19:00 UTC+9

Vissel Kobe (Japan)	2−0	(South Korea) Jeonbuk Hyundai Motors
Osako 11'; Kuwasaki 68'	Report

Noevir Stadium Kobe, Kobe
Attendance: 7,136
Referee: Omar Al-Ali (United Arab Emirates)

14 October 2026
19:00 UTC+9

Kashiwa Reysol (Japan)	5−1	(Thailand) Port
Kubo 3'; Kakita 10'; Harakawa 15' (pen.); Yuruki 26'; Yamauchi 28'	Report	Bihr 64'

Sankyo Frontier Kashiwa Stadium, Kashiwa
Attendance: 7,993
Referee: Ammar Mahfoodh (Bahrain)

===== Matchday 3 =====
27 October 2026
18:00 UTC+8

Shanghai Port (China)	2–3	(Vietnam) Công An Hà Nội
Ampem 44'; Campos 60'	Report	Perea 35', 69'; Artur 49'

Pudong Football Stadium, Shanghai
Attendance: 10,399
Referee: Choi Hyun-jai (South Korea)

27 October 2026
18:00 UTC+8

Johor Darul Ta'zim (Malaysia)	3–0	(Thailand) Port
Silva 53'; Bérgson 62'; Stoichkov 86'	Report

Sultan Ibrahim Stadium, Iskandar Puteri
Attendance: 19,174
Referee: Alireza Faghani (Australia)

27 October 2026
19:00 UTC+9

Daejeon Hana Citizen (South Korea)	0–1	(Japan) Vissel Kobe
	Report	Komatsu 83'

Daejeon World Cup Stadium, Daejeon
Attendance: 6,278
Referee: Nazmi Nasaruddin (Malaysia)

27 October 2026
19:00 UTC+9

Kyoto Sanga (Japan)	5–2	(Australia) Newcastle Jets
Tawiah 45+6'; A. Souza 56', 84'; Túlio 60'; Elias 67'	Report	Wood 13' (pen.), 45+2' (pen.)

Sanga Stadium by Kyocera, Kameoka
Attendance: 4,205
Referee: Kim Jong-hyeok (South Korea)

27 October 2026
20:15 UTC+8

Beijing Guoan (China)	2–2	(South Korea) Jeonbuk Hyundai Motors
Dudziak 34'; Wang Gang 52'	Report	Mota 2'; Lee Yeong-jae 64'

Workers' Stadium, Beijing
Attendance: 27,638
Referee: Mooud Bonyadifard (Iran)

27 October 2026
19:15 UTC+7

Ratchaburi (Thailand)	0–0	(Japan) Kashiwa Reysol
	Report

Dragon Solar Park, Ratchaburi
Attendance: 3,613
Referee: Majed Al-Shamrani (Saudi Arabia)

28 October 2026
19:00 UTC+9

Kashima Antlers (Japan)	3–0	(South Korea) Pohang Steelers
Koike 69'; Čavrić 75'; Bueno 87'	Report

Kashima Soccer Stadium, Kashima
Attendance: 5,676
Referee: Sadullo Gulmurodi (Tajikistan)

28 October 2026
19:00 UTC+9

Gamba Osaka (Japan)	1–1	(Thailand) Buriram United
Usami 66'	Report	Mancha 39'

Suita City Football Stadium, Suita
Attendance: 10,215
Referee: Zaid Thamer Mohammed (Iraq)

===== Matchday 4 =====
3 November 2026
18:45 UTC+11

Newcastle Jets (Australia)	2–4	(China) Shanghai Port
Wood 58'; Bertoncello 80'	Report	Leonardo 23'; Aquilina 26' (o.g.); Ampem 51'; Li Xinxiang 86'

Newcastle International Sports Centre, Newcastle
Attendance: 1,614
Referee: Omar Al-Ali (United Arab Emirates)

3 November 2026
19:00 UTC+9

Jeonbuk Hyundai Motors (South Korea)	2–0	(Malaysia) Johor Darul Ta'zim
Mota 22'; Italo 45+3' (pen.)	Report

Jeonju World Cup Stadium, Jeonju
Attendance: 3,370
Referee: Khalid Al-Turais (Saudi Arabia)

3 November 2026
19:00 UTC+9

Vissel Kobe (Japan)	3–2	(Thailand) Ratchaburi
Hamasaki 34'; Erik 83'; Yamakawa 88'	Report	Phongsakon 64'; Ekanit 82'

Noevir Stadium Kobe, Kobe
Attendance: 7,370
Referee: Ahmad Al-Ali (Kuwait)

3 November 2026
19:00 UTC+9

Kashiwa Reysol (Japan)	2–0	(South Korea) Daejeon Hana Citizen
K. Endō 47'; Fujio 57'	Report

Sankyo Frontier Kashiwa Stadium, Kashiwa
Attendance: 10,166
Referee: Alireza Faghani (Australia)

3 November 2026
19:15 UTC+7

Port (Thailand)	7–4	(China) Beijing Guoan
Soonsup-Bell 17', 19'; Bordin 29', 78', 81'; Teerasak 90+1', 90+5'	Report	Akolo 5'; Dawhan 23', 41'; Shimura 37' (o.g.)

Pathum Thani Stadium, Pathum Thani
Attendance: 1,492
Referee: Salman Falahi (Qatar)

3 November 2026
19:15 UTC+7

Công An Hà Nội (Vietnam)	0–0	(Japan) Kyoto Sanga
	Report

Hàng Đẫy Stadium, Hanoi
Attendance: 6,129
Referee: Ammar Mahfoodh (Bahrain)

4 November 2026
19:00 UTC+9

Pohang Steelers (South Korea)	3–3	(Japan) Gamba Osaka
Wanderson 55'; J. Teixeira 77'; Kim Gwang-won 89'	Report	Meshino 34'; Adams 69'; Sumi 79'

Pohang Steel Yard, Pohang
Attendance: 2,853
Referee: Adel Al-Naqbi (United Arab Emirates)

4 November 2026
19:15 UTC+7

Buriram United (Thailand)	0–0	(Japan) Kashima Antlers
	Report

Buriram Stadium, Buriram
Attendance: 18,090
Referee: Nazmi Nasaruddin (Malaysia)

===== Matchday 5 =====
24 November 2026
18:45 UTC+11

Newcastle Jets (Australia)	v	(Japan) Kashiwa Reysol

Central Coast Stadium, Gosford (Note: Newcastle Jets played their Matchday 5 game at the Central Coast Stadium in Gosford, instead of their regular home ground, the Newcastle International Sports Centre in Newcastle, due to the venue being unavailable during that time.)

24 November 2026
19:00 UTC+9

Daejeon Hana Citizen (South Korea)	v	(China) Beijing Guoan

Daejeon World Cup Stadium, Daejeon

24 November 2026
19:00 UTC+9

Kyoto Sanga (Japan)	v	(South Korea) Pohang Steelers

Sanga Stadium by Kyocera, Kameoka

24 November 2026
20:15 UTC+8

Shanghai Port (China)	v	(Thailand) Buriram United

Pudong Football Stadium, Shanghai

24 November 2026
19:15 UTC+7

Ratchaburi (Thailand)	v	(Malaysia) Johor Darul Ta'zim

Dragon Solar Park, Ratchaburi

24 November 2026
19:15 UTC+7

Công An Hà Nội (Vietnam)	v	(Japan) Vissel Kobe

Hàng Đẫy Stadium, Hanoi

25 November 2026
19:00 UTC+9

Kashima Antlers (Japan)	v	(South Korea) Jeonbuk Hyundai Motors

Kashima Soccer Stadium, Kashima

25 November 2026
19:00 UTC+9

Gamba Osaka (Japan)	v	(Thailand) Port

Suita City Football Stadium, Suita

===== Matchday 6 =====
1 December 2026
19:00 UTC+9

Vissel Kobe (Japan)	v	(Australia) Newcastle Jets

Noevir Stadium Kobe, Kobe

1 December 2026
19:00 UTC+9

Kashiwa Reysol (Japan)	v	(Vietnam) Công An Hà Nội

Sankyo Frontier Kashiwa Stadium, Kashiwa

1 December 2026
19:00 UTC+9

Pohang Steelers (South Korea)	v	(China) Shanghai Port

Pohang Steel Yard, Pohang

1 December 2026
20:15 UTC+8

Johor Darul Ta'zim (Malaysia)	v	(South Korea) Daejeon Hana Citizen

Sultan Ibrahim Stadium, Iskandar Puteri

1 December 2026
20:15 UTC+8

Beijing Guoan (China)	v	(Thailand) Ratchaburi

Workers' Stadium, Beijing

1 December 2026
19:15 UTC+7

Buriram United (Thailand)	v	(Japan) Kyoto Sanga

Buriram Stadium, Buriram

2 December 2026
19:00 UTC+9

Jeonbuk Hyundai Motors (South Korea)	v	(Japan) Gamba Osaka

Jeonju World Cup Stadium, Jeonju

2 December 2026
19:15 UTC+7

Port (Thailand)	v	(Japan) Kashima Antlers

Pathum Thani Stadium, Pathum Thani

===== Matchday 7 =====
9 February 2027
18:45 UTC+11

Newcastle Jets (Australia)	v	(Malaysia) Johor Darul Ta'zim

Newcastle International Sports Centre, Newcastle

9 February 2027
18:00 UTC+8

Shanghai Port (China)	v	(Thailand) Port

Pudong Football Stadium, Shanghai

9 February 2027
19:00 UTC+9

Daejeon Hana Citizen (South Korea)	v	(Japan) Kashima Antlers

Daejeon World Cup Stadium, Daejeon

9 February 2027
19:00 UTC+9

Kyoto Sanga (Japan)	v	(South Korea) Jeonbuk Hyundai Motors

Sanga Stadium by Kyocera, Kameoka

9 February 2027
19:15 UTC+7

Ratchaburi (Thailand)	v	(Japan) Gamba Osaka

Dragon Solar Park, Ratchaburi

9 February 2027
19:15 UTC+7

Công An Hà Nội (Vietnam)	v	(China) Beijing Guoan

Hàng Đẫy Stadium, Hanoi

10 February 2027
19:00 UTC+9

Vissel Kobe (Japan)	v	(South Korea) Pohang Steelers

Noevir Stadium Kobe, Kobe

10 February 2027
19:00 UTC+9

Kashiwa Reysol (Japan)	v	(Thailand) Buriram United

Sankyo Frontier Kashiwa Stadium, Kashiwa

===== Matchday 8 =====
16 February 2027
19:00 UTC+9

Kashima Antlers (Japan)	v	(Thailand) Ratchaburi

Kashima Soccer Stadium, Kashima

16 February 2027
19:00 UTC+9

Jeonbuk Hyundai Motors (South Korea)	v	(China) Shanghai Port

Jeonju World Cup Stadium, Jeonju

16 February 2027
17:00 UTC+7

Buriram United (Thailand)	v	(Japan) Vissel Kobe

Buriram Stadium, Buriram

16 February 2027
18:00 UTC+8

Johor Darul Ta'zim (Malaysia)	v	(Vietnam) Công An Hà Nội

Sultan Ibrahim Stadium, Iskandar Puteri

16 February 2027
17:00 UTC+7

Port (Thailand)	v	(Japan) Kyoto Sanga

Pathum Thani Stadium, Pathum Thani

16 February 2027
18:00 UTC+8

Beijing Guoan (China)	v	(Australia) Newcastle Jets

Workers' Stadium, Beijing

16 February 2027
19:00 UTC+9

Gamba Osaka (Japan)	v	(South Korea) Daejeon Hana Citizen

Suita City Football Stadium, Suita

16 February 2027
19:00 UTC+9

Pohang Steelers (South Korea)	v	(Japan) Kashiwa Reysol

Pohang Steel Yard, Pohang

== See also ==
- 2026–27 AFC Champions League Two group stage
- 2026–27 AFC Challenge League group stage
