= 2026–27 AFC Champions League Elite =

Association football tournament

Tournament details
- Dates: Qualifying: 11 August 2026; Competition proper: 14 September 2026 – 1 May 2027
- Teams: Competition proper: 32; Total: 36 (from 14 associations)

Tournament statistics
- Matches played: 63
- Goals scored: 204 (3.24 per match)
- Attendance: 602,790 (9,568 per match)
- Top scorer(s): Prince Ampem (6 goals)
- All statistics correct as of 4 November 2026.

The 2026–27 AFC Champions League Elite (ACL Elite) is the 45th edition of Asia's premier club football tournament, organized by the Asian Football Confederation (AFC), and the third under the AFC Champions League Elite title.

Saudi Arabia has provisionally been awarded the hosting rights for the finals until 2029. The tournament winner will qualify for the 2027–28 AFC Champions League Elite league stage, the 2027 FIFA Intercontinental Cup and the 2029 FIFA Club World Cup.

This has been the first season of the ACL Elite to feature 32 teams in the league stage of the competition, with the AFC confirming expansion on 24 April 2026. This will be the first season since the 2019 AFC Champions League, in which 32 teams will compete in the competition proper.

Al-Ahli are two-time defending champions, having retained the title in 2026.

== Association team allocation ==
The associations are allocated slots according to their club competitions ranking which was published after the 2024–25 competitions were completed.

Participation for 2026–27 AFC Champions League Elite
| Participating |
| Not participating |

West Region (16 teams)
| Rank | | Member association | Points | Slots | |
| Rank | | Member association | Points | League stage | Preliminary stage |
| Region | AFC | Member association | Points | League stage | Preliminary stage |
|---|---|---|---|---|---|
| 1 | 1 | Saudi Arabia | 119.957 | 4 | 1 |
| 2 | 4 | United Arab Emirates | 74.466 | 3 | 1 |
| 3 | 5 | Qatar | 69.326 | 3 | 0 |
| 4 | 6 | Iran | 68.907 | 2 | 0 |
| 5 | 9 | Uzbekistan | 49.821 | 1 | 1 |
| 6 | 12 | Iraq | 39.280 | 1 | 0 |
| 7 | 13 | Jordan | 36.905 | 0 | 1 |
| Total | | Participating associations: 7 | | 14 | 4 |
| Total | | Participating associations: 7 | | 18 | |

East Region (16 teams)
| Rank | | Member association | Points | Slots | |
| Rank | | Member association | Points | League stage | Preliminary stage |
| Region | AFC | Member association | Points | League stage | Preliminary stage |
|---|---|---|---|---|---|
| 1 | 2 | Japan | 107.663 | 4 | 1 |
| 2 | 3 | South Korea | 90.982 | 3 | 1 |
| 3 | 7 | Thailand | 54.873 | 3 | 0 |
| 4 | 8 | China | 54.682 | 2 | 0 |
| 5 | 10 | Australia | 40.420 | 1 | 1 |
| 6 | 11 | Malaysia | 40.039 | 1 | 0 |
| 7 | 14 | Vietnam | 35.038 | 0 | 1 |
| Total | | Participating associations: 7 | | 14 | 4 |
| Total | | Participating associations: 7 | | 18 | |

== Teams ==
| Entry round | West Region | | | East Region | | |
| League stage | Team | Qualifying method | App. (last) | Team | Qualifying method | App. (last) |
|---|---|---|---|---|---|---|
| League stage | (Saudi Arabia) Al-Ahli | 2025–26 AFC Champions League Elite winners 2025–26 Saudi Pro League third place | 16th (2025–26) | (Japan) Kashima Antlers | 2025 J1 League champions | 11th (2020) |
| League stage | (Saudi Arabia) Al-Nassr | 2025–26 Saudi Pro League champions | 9th (2024–25) | (Japan) Vissel Kobe | J1 100 Year Vision League champions | 5th (2025–26) |
| League stage | (Saudi Arabia) Al-Hilal | 2025–26 Saudi Pro League runners-up | 22nd (2025–26) | (Japan) Kashiwa Reysol | 2025 J1 League runners-up | 5th (2018) |
| League stage | (Saudi Arabia) Al-Qadsiah | 2025–26 Saudi Pro League fourth place | 1st | (Japan) Kyoto Sanga | 2025 J1 League third place | 1st |
| League stage | (United Arab Emirates) Al Ain | 2025–26 UAE Pro League champions 2025–26 UAE President's Cup winners | 19th (2024–25) | (South Korea) Jeonbuk Hyundai Motors | 2025 K League 1 champions | 17th (2023–24) |
| League stage | (United Arab Emirates) Shabab Al Ahli | 2025–26 UAE Pro League runners-up | 14th (2025–26) | (South Korea) Daejeon Hana Citizen | 2025 K League 1 runners-up | 2nd (2002–03) |
| League stage | (United Arab Emirates) Al Wasl | 2025–26 UAE Pro League third place | 5th (2024–25) | (South Korea) Pohang Steelers | 2025 K League 1 fourth place | 11th (2024–25) |
| League stage | (Qatar) Al Sadd | 2025–26 Qatar Stars League champions | 21st (2025–26) | (Thailand) Buriram United | 2025–26 Thai League 1 champions | 14th (2025–26) |
| League stage | (Qatar) Al-Gharafa | 2026 Amir of Qatar Cup winners | 15th (2025–26) | (Thailand) Port | 2025–26 Thai League 1 runners-up | 5th (2023–24) |
| League stage | (Qatar) Al-Shamal | 2025–26 Qatar Stars League runners-up | 1st | (Thailand) Ratchaburi | 2025–26 Thai League 1 third place | 2nd (2021) |
| League stage | (Iran) Esteghlal | 2025–26 Persian Gulf Pro League first place | 13th (2024–25) | (China) Shanghai Port | 2025 Chinese Super League champions | 10th (2025–26) |
| League stage | (Iran) Tractor | 2025–26 Persian Gulf Pro League second place | 8th (2025–26) | (China) Beijing Guoan | 2025 Chinese FA Cup winners | 11th (2021) |
| League stage | (Uzbekistan) Neftchi | 2025 Uzbekistan Super League champions | 6th (2012) | (Australia) Newcastle Jets | 2025–26 A-League Men regular season premiers | 3rd (2019) |
| League stage | (Iraq) Al-Quwa Al-Jawiya | 2025–26 Iraq Stars League champions | 8th (2023–24) | (Malaysia) Johor Darul Ta'zim | 2025–26 Malaysia Super League champions | 12th (2025–26) |
| Preliminary stage | (Saudi Arabia) Al-Ittihad | 2025–26 Saudi Pro League fifth place | 14th (2025–26) | (Japan) Gamba Osaka | 2025–26 AFC Champions League Two winners | 11th (2021) |
| Preliminary stage | (United Arab Emirates) Al Jazira | 2025–26 UAE Pro League fourth place | 12th (2022) | (South Korea) Gangwon FC | 2025 K League 1 fifth place | 2nd (2025–26) |
| Preliminary stage | (Uzbekistan) Pakhtakor | 2025 Uzbekistan Cup winners | 21st (2024–25) | (Australia) Adelaide United | 2025–26 A-League Men regular season runners-up | 7th (2017) |
| Preliminary stage | (Jordan) Al-Hussein | 2025–26 Jordanian Pro League champions | 1st | (Vietnam) Công An Hà Nội | 2025–26 V.League 1 champions | 1st |

Notes

1. Iran (IRN): The 2025–26 Persian Gulf Pro League was left unfinished due to the 2026 Iran war, as well as the presence of the Iran national team at the 2026 World Cup, and most teams opposed continuing the league. Therefore, the Football Federation of Iran introduced Esteghlal and Tractor (the first and second teams) as the teams advancing to the AFC Champions League Elite.
2. Japan (JPN): The champions of the J1 100 Year Vision League were given qualification spots due to the transition of the J1 League to a September to May season calendar.
3. South Korea (KOR): As the 2025 K League 1 third-placed team, Gimcheon Sangmu is ineligible to qualify for AFC competitions due its military ownership; the spot reserved for the K League 1 third-placed team was transferred to the fourth-placed team in the league, and the spot reserved for the K League 1 fourth-placed team was transferred to the fifth-placed team in the league.
4. BYE: Received a bye to the League Stage in accordance with the relevant Competition Regulations

== Schedule ==
The schedule of the competition is expected to be as follows.

Schedule for 2026–27 AFC Champions League Elite
| Stage | Round | Draw date | West region | East region |
|---|---|---|---|---|
| Preliminary stage | | No draw | 11 August 2026 | |
| League stage | Matchday 1 | 18 August 2026 | 14–15 September 2026 | 15–16 September 2026 |
| League stage | Matchday 2 | 18 August 2026 | 12–13 October 2026 | 13–14 October 2026 |
| League stage | Matchday 3 | 18 August 2026 | 26–27 October 2026 | 27–28 October 2026 |
| League stage | Matchday 4 | 18 August 2026 | 2–3 November 2026 | 3–4 November 2026 |
| League stage | Matchday 5 | 18 August 2026 | 23–24 November 2026 | 24–25 November 2026 |
| League stage | Matchday 6 | 18 August 2026 | 7–8 December 2026 | 1–2 December 2026 |
| League stage | Matchday 7 | 18 August 2026 | 8–9 February 2027 | 9–10 February 2027 |
| League stage | Matchday 8 | 18 August 2026 | 15–16 February 2027 | 16–17 February 2027 |
| Round of 16 | | 25 February 2027 | 1–16 March 2027 | 9–17 March 2027 |
| Finals | Quarter-finals | 13 March 2027 | 23–30 April 2027 | |
| Finals | Semi-finals | 13 March 2027 | 23–30 April 2027 | |
| Finals | Final | 13 March 2027 | 1 May 2027 | |

== Preliminary round ==
The four winners of the play-off round (two from West Region and two from East Region) advanced to the league stage to join the 28 direct entrants. The losers of the preliminary round entered the group stage of the 2026–27 AFC Champions League Two.

| Team 1 | Score | Team 2 |
|---|---|---|
West Region
| Al Jazira (United Arab Emirates) | 1–4 | (Saudi Arabia) Al-Ittihad |
| Pakhtakor (Uzbekistan) | 3–0 | (Jordan) Al-Hussein |
East Region
| Gangwon (South Korea) | 0–1 (a.e.t.) | (Japan) Gamba Osaka |
| Adelaide United (Australia) | 0–2 | (Vietnam) Công An Hà Nội |

=== West Region ===
11 August 2026
20:00 UTC+4

| Al Jazira (United Arab Emirates) | 1−4 | (Saudi Arabia) Al-Ittihad |
|---|---|---|
| Banza 80' | AFC Report; GSA Report | Bergwijn 12', 38'; Aouar 54'; Al-Sahafi 69' |

Mohammed Bin Zayed Stadium, Abu Dhabi
Attendance: 5,900
Referee: Qasim Al-Hatmi (Oman)
11 August 2026
20:00 UTC+5

| Pakhtakor (Uzbekistan) | 3–0 | (Jordan) Al-Hussein |
|---|---|---|
| Khamdamov 7', 30'; Resan 52' | AFC Report; GSA Report |

Pakhtakor Central Stadium, Tashkent
Attendance: 2,500
Referee: Kim Woo-sung (South Korea)

=== East Region ===
11 August 2026
19:30 UTC+9

| Gangwon (South Korea) | 0–1 (a.e.t.) | (Japan) Gamba Osaka |
|---|---|---|
| | AFC Report; GSA Report | Nawata 103' |

Gangneung Stadium, Gangneung
Attendance: 5,404
Referee: Salman Falahi (Qatar)
11 August 2026
19:00 UTC+9:30

| Adelaide United (Australia) | 0–2 | (Vietnam) Công An Hà Nội |
|---|---|---|
| | AFC Report; GSA Report | Henen 41'; Perea 64' |

Hindmarsh Stadium, Adelaide
Attendance: 6,451
Referee: Asker Nadjafaliev (Uzbekistan)

== League stage ==
Location of the 2026–27 AFC Champions League Elite league stage teams
Orange: East Region; Blue: West Region

Location of the 2026–27 AFC Champions League Elite league stage teams in Qatar and the United Arab Emirates.
Location of the 2026–27 AFC Champions League Elite teams in China, Japan and South Korea.
2025 J1 League teams in Keihanshin

=== West Region ===
| Pos | Team | Pld | W | D | L | GF | GA | GD | Pts | Qualification |
|---|---|---|---|---|---|---|---|---|---|---|
| 1 | (United Arab Emirates) Al Ain | 4 | 4 | 0 | 0 | 14 | 3 | +11 | 12 | Advance to round of 16 |
| 2 | (Saudi Arabia) Al-Hilal | 4 | 3 | 0 | 1 | 7 | 4 | +3 | 9 | Advance to round of 16 |
| 3 | (Iran) Esteghlal | 4 | 3 | 0 | 1 | 6 | 3 | +3 | 9 | Advance to round of 16 |
| 4 | (United Arab Emirates) Shabab Al Ahli | 4 | 3 | 0 | 1 | 5 | 3 | +2 | 9 | Advance to round of 16 |
| 5 | (Saudi Arabia) Al-Qadsiah | 4 | 2 | 2 | 0 | 9 | 3 | +6 | 8 | Advance to round of 16 |
| 6 | (Saudi Arabia) Al-Ahli | 4 | 2 | 2 | 0 | 6 | 3 | +3 | 8 | Advance to round of 16 |
| 7 | (Saudi Arabia) Al-Nassr | 3 | 2 | 0 | 1 | 9 | 7 | +2 | 6 | Advance to round of 16 |
| 8 | (Qatar) Al-Shamal | 4 | 1 | 2 | 1 | 4 | 3 | +1 | 5 | Advance to round of 16 |
| 9 | (Uzbekistan) Neftchi | 4 | 1 | 1 | 2 | 5 | 7 | −2 | 4 | |
| 10 | (Saudi Arabia) Al-Ittihad | 4 | 1 | 1 | 2 | 5 | 8 | −3 | 4 | |
| 11 | (United Arab Emirates) Al Wasl | 3 | 1 | 0 | 2 | 6 | 8 | −2 | 3 | |
| 12 | (Iraq) Al-Quwa Al-Jawiya | 4 | 1 | 0 | 3 | 5 | 9 | −4 | 3 | |
| 13 | (Iran) Tractor | 4 | 0 | 2 | 2 | 3 | 5 | −2 | 2 | |
| 14 | (Uzbekistan) Pakhtakor | 4 | 0 | 2 | 2 | 4 | 9 | −5 | 2 | |
| 15 | (Qatar) Al Sadd | 4 | 0 | 2 | 2 | 1 | 6 | −5 | 2 | |
| 16 | (Qatar) Al-Gharafa | 4 | 0 | 0 | 4 | 3 | 11 | −8 | 0 | |

Updated to match(es) played on 3 November 2026. Source: AFC
Rules for classification: 1) points; 2) goal difference; 3) number of goals scored; 4) number of matches won; 5) penalty shoot-out if only two teams remain tied and played each other on the final matchday 6) fair play ranking; 7) drawing of lots

Matchday 1
| Home team | Score | Away team |
|---|---|---|
| Neftchi (Uzbekistan) | 1–0 | (Iraq) Al-Quwa Al-Jawiya |
| Shabab Al Ahli (United Arab Emirates) | 1–0 | (Iran) Tractor |
| Al-Shamal (Qatar) | 1–1 | (Saudi Arabia) Al-Ittihad |
| Al-Ahli (Saudi Arabia) | 1–1 | (Uzbekistan) Pakhtakor |
| Esteghlal (Iran) | 3–0 | (Qatar) Al Sadd |
| Al-Qadsiah (Saudi Arabia) | 2–1 | (United Arab Emirates) Al Wasl |
| Al Ain (United Arab Emirates) | 4–0 | (Saudi Arabia) Al-Nassr |
| Al-Hilal (Saudi Arabia) | 2–1 | (Qatar) Al-Gharafa |

Matchday 2
| Home team | Score | Away team |
|---|---|---|
| Pakhtakor (Uzbekistan) | 1–1 | (Saudi Arabia) Al-Qadsiah |
| Tractor (Iran) | 0–0 | (Qatar) Al-Shamal |
| Al Wasl (United Arab Emirates) | 1–3 | (Saudi Arabia) Al-Ahli |
| Al-Quwa Al-Jawiya (Iraq) | 1–4 | (United Arab Emirates) Al Ain |
| Al-Nassr (Saudi Arabia) | 3–1 | (Uzbekistan) Neftchi |
| Al-Gharafa (Qatar) | 1–2 | (Iran) Esteghlal |
| Al Sadd (Qatar) | 0–2 | (Saudi Arabia) Al-Hilal |
| Al-Ittihad (Saudi Arabia) | 1–2 | (United Arab Emirates) Shabab Al Ahli |

Matchday 3
| Home team | Score | Away team |
|---|---|---|
| Neftchi (Uzbekistan) | 1–2 | (Saudi Arabia) Al-Ittihad |
| Al-Ahli (Saudi Arabia) | 2–1 | (Qatar) Al-Gharafa |
| Al Ain (United Arab Emirates) | 2–1 | (Iran) Tractor |
| Al-Quwa Al-Jawiya (Iraq) | 1–0 | (Uzbekistan) Pakhtakor |
| Al-Qadsiah (Saudi Arabia) | 1–1 | (Qatar) Al Sadd |
| Shabab Al Ahli (United Arab Emirates) | 2–0 | (Iran) Esteghlal |
| Al-Shamal (Qatar) | 3–1 | (Saudi Arabia) Al-Hilal |
| Al-Nassr (Saudi Arabia) | v | (United Arab Emirates) Al Wasl |

Matchday 4
| Home team | Score | Away team |
|---|---|---|
| Pakhtakor (Uzbekistan) | 2–6 | (Saudi Arabia) Al-Nassr |
| Tractor (Iran) | 2–2 | (Uzbekistan) Neftchi |
| Al Wasl (United Arab Emirates) | 4–3 | (Iraq) Al-Quwa Al-Jawiya |
| Al Sadd (Qatar) | 0–0 | (Saudi Arabia) Al-Ahli |
| Al-Ittihad (Saudi Arabia) | 1–4 | (United Arab Emirates) Al Ain |
| Al-Gharafa (Qatar) | 0–5 | (Saudi Arabia) Al-Qadsiah |
| Esteghlal (Iran) | 1–0 | (Qatar) Al-Shamal |
| Al-Hilal (Saudi Arabia) | 2–0 | (United Arab Emirates) Shabab Al Ahli |

Matchday 5
| Home team | Score | Away team |
|---|---|---|
| Neftchi (Uzbekistan) | v | (Saudi Arabia) Al-Hilal |
| Al Ain (United Arab Emirates) | v | (Iran) Esteghlal |
| Tractor (Iran) | v | (United Arab Emirates) Al Wasl |
| Al-Shamal (Qatar) | v | (Saudi Arabia) Al-Ahli |
| Al-Ittihad (Saudi Arabia) | v | (Uzbekistan) Pakhtakor |
| Al-Quwa Al-Jawiya (Iraq) | v | (Qatar) Al-Gharafa |
| Shabab Al Ahli (United Arab Emirates) | v | (Saudi Arabia) Al-Qadsiah |
| Al-Nassr (Saudi Arabia) | v | (Qatar) Al Sadd |

Matchday 6
| Home team | Score | Away team |
|---|---|---|
| Pakhtakor (Uzbekistan) | v | (Iran) Tractor |
| Al Wasl (United Arab Emirates) | v | (Saudi Arabia) Al-Ittihad |
| Al-Qadsiah (Saudi Arabia) | v | (Qatar) Al-Shamal |
| Esteghlal (Iran) | v | (Uzbekistan) Neftchi |
| Al-Hilal (Saudi Arabia) | v | (United Arab Emirates) Al Ain |
| Al Sadd (Qatar) | v | (Iraq) Al-Quwa Al-Jawiya |
| Al-Gharafa (Qatar) | v | (Saudi Arabia) Al-Nassr |
| Al-Ahli (Saudi Arabia) | v | (United Arab Emirates) Shabab Al Ahli |

Matchday 7
| Home team | Score | Away team |
|---|---|---|
| Pakhtakor (Uzbekistan) | v | (Iran) Esteghlal |
| Tractor (Iran) | v | (Qatar) Al Sadd |
| Al Ain (United Arab Emirates) | v | (Saudi Arabia) Al-Qadsiah |
| Al-Quwa Al-Jawiya (Iraq) | v | (United Arab Emirates) Shabab Al Ahli |
| Al-Nassr (Saudi Arabia) | v | (Qatar) Al-Shamal |
| Al-Ittihad (Saudi Arabia) | v | (Qatar) Al-Gharafa |
| Neftchi (Uzbekistan) | v | (Saudi Arabia) Al-Ahli |
| Al Wasl (United Arab Emirates) | v | (Saudi Arabia) Al-Hilal |

Matchday 8
| Home team | Score | Away team |
|---|---|---|
| Al-Ahli (Saudi Arabia) | v | (United Arab Emirates) Al Ain |
| Al Sadd (Qatar) | v | (Saudi Arabia) Al-Ittihad |
| Esteghlal (Iran) | v | (United Arab Emirates) Al Wasl |
| Shabab Al Ahli (United Arab Emirates) | v | (Saudi Arabia) Al-Nassr |
| Al-Gharafa (Qatar) | v | (Iran) Tractor |
| Al-Hilal (Saudi Arabia) | v | (Uzbekistan) Pakhtakor |
| Al-Shamal (Qatar) | v | (Iraq) Al-Quwa Al-Jawiya |
| Al-Qadsiah (Saudi Arabia) | v | (Uzbekistan) Neftchi |

=== East Region ===
| Pos | Team | Pld | W | D | L | GF | GA | GD | Pts | Qualification |
|---|---|---|---|---|---|---|---|---|---|---|
| 1 | (Japan) Vissel Kobe | 4 | 4 | 0 | 0 | 8 | 3 | +5 | 12 | Advance to round of 16 |
| 2 | (Japan) Kashima Antlers | 4 | 3 | 1 | 0 | 11 | 1 | +10 | 10 | Advance to round of 16 |
| 3 | (Japan) Gamba Osaka | 4 | 2 | 2 | 0 | 11 | 6 | +5 | 8 | Advance to round of 16 |
| 4 | (Japan) Kashiwa Reysol | 4 | 2 | 1 | 1 | 8 | 3 | +5 | 7 | Advance to round of 16 |
| 5 | (China) Shanghai Port | 4 | 2 | 1 | 1 | 13 | 10 | +3 | 7 | Advance to round of 16 |
| 6 | (Japan) Kyoto Sanga | 4 | 2 | 1 | 1 | 6 | 3 | +3 | 7 | Advance to round of 16 |
| 6 | (Malaysia) Johor Darul Ta'zim | 4 | 2 | 1 | 1 | 6 | 3 | +3 | 7 | Advance to round of 16 |
| 8 | (South Korea) Jeonbuk Hyundai Motors | 4 | 2 | 1 | 1 | 6 | 5 | +1 | 7 | Advance to round of 16 |
| 9 | (China) Beijing Guoan | 4 | 2 | 1 | 1 | 10 | 10 | 0 | 7 | |
| 10 | (South Korea) Daejeon Hana Citizen | 4 | 1 | 1 | 2 | 2 | 4 | −2 | 4 | |
| 11 | (Vietnam) Công An Hà Nội | 4 | 1 | 1 | 2 | 4 | 7 | −3 | 4 | |
| 12 | (Thailand) Buriram United | 4 | 0 | 3 | 1 | 2 | 3 | −1 | 3 | |
| 13 | (Thailand) Port | 4 | 1 | 0 | 3 | 9 | 14 | −5 | 3 | |
| 14 | (Thailand) Ratchaburi | 4 | 0 | 1 | 3 | 6 | 10 | −4 | 1 | |
| 15 | (South Korea) Pohang Steelers | 4 | 0 | 1 | 3 | 4 | 11 | −7 | 1 | |
| 16 | (Australia) Newcastle Jets | 4 | 0 | 0 | 4 | 6 | 19 | −13 | 0 | |

Updated to match(es) played on 4 November 2026. Source: AFC
Rules for classification: 1) points; 2) goal difference; 3) number of goals scored; 4) number of matches won; 5) penalty shoot-out if only two teams remain tied and played each other on the final matchday 6) fair play ranking; 7) drawing of lots

Matchday 1
| Home team | Score | Away team |
|---|---|---|
| Kashima Antlers (Japan) | 7–1 | (Australia) Newcastle Jets |
| Daejeon Hana Citizen (South Korea) | 1–0 | (Japan) Kyoto Sanga |
| Gamba Osaka (Japan) | 4–1 | (Vietnam) Công An Hà Nội |
| Ratchaburi (Thailand) | 4–6 | (China) Shanghai Port |
| Johor Darul Ta'zim (Malaysia) | 1–1 | (Thailand) Buriram United |
| Beijing Guoan (China) | 3–1 | (South Korea) Pohang Steelers |
| Jeonbuk Hyundai Motors (South Korea) | 2–1 | (Japan) Kashiwa Reysol |
| Port (Thailand) | 1–2 | (Japan) Vissel Kobe |

Matchday 2
| Home team | Score | Away team |
|---|---|---|
| Newcastle Jets (Australia) | 1–3 | (Japan) Gamba Osaka |
| Kyoto Sanga (Japan) | 1–0 | (Thailand) Ratchaburi |
| Pohang Steelers (South Korea) | 0–2 | (Malaysia) Johor Darul Ta'zim |
| Shanghai Port (China) | 1–1 | (South Korea) Daejeon Hana Citizen |
| Buriram United (Thailand) | 0–1 | (China) Beijing Guoan |
| Công An Hà Nội (Vietnam) | 0–1 | (Japan) Kashima Antlers |
| Vissel Kobe (Japan) | 2–0 | (South Korea) Jeonbuk Hyundai Motors |
| Kashiwa Reysol (Japan) | 5–1 | (Thailand) Port |

Matchday 3
| Home team | Score | Away team |
|---|---|---|
| Shanghai Port (China) | 2–3 | (Vietnam) Công An Hà Nội |
| Johor Darul Ta'zim (Malaysia) | 3–0 | (Thailand) Port |
| Daejeon Hana Citizen (South Korea) | 0–1 | (Japan) Vissel Kobe |
| Kyoto Sanga (Japan) | 5–2 | (Australia) Newcastle Jets |
| Beijing Guoan (China) | 2–2 | (South Korea) Jeonbuk Hyundai Motors |
| Ratchaburi (Thailand) | 0–0 | (Japan) Kashiwa Reysol |
| Kashima Antlers (Japan) | 3–0 | (South Korea) Pohang Steelers |
| Gamba Osaka (Japan) | 1–1 | (Thailand) Buriram United |

Matchday 4
| Home team | Score | Away team |
|---|---|---|
| Newcastle Jets (Australia) | 2–4 | (China) Shanghai Port |
| Jeonbuk Hyundai Motors (South Korea) | 2–0 | (Malaysia) Johor Darul Ta'zim |
| Vissel Kobe (Japan) | 3–2 | (Thailand) Ratchaburi |
| Kashiwa Reysol (Japan) | 2–0 | (South Korea) Daejeon Hana Citizen |
| Port (Thailand) | 7–4 | (China) Beijing Guoan |
| Công An Hà Nội (Vietnam) | 0–0 | (Japan) Kyoto Sanga |
| Pohang Steelers (South Korea) | 3–3 | (Japan) Gamba Osaka |
| Buriram United (Thailand) | 0–0 | (Japan) Kashima Antlers |

Matchday 5
| Home team | Score | Away team |
|---|---|---|
| Newcastle Jets (Australia) | v | (Japan) Kashiwa Reysol |
| Daejeon Hana Citizen (South Korea) | v | (China) Beijing Guoan |
| Kyoto Sanga (Japan) | v | (South Korea) Pohang Steelers |
| Shanghai Port (China) | v | (Thailand) Buriram United |
| Ratchaburi (Thailand) | v | (Malaysia) Johor Darul Ta'zim |
| Công An Hà Nội (Vietnam) | v | (Japan) Vissel Kobe |
| Kashima Antlers (Japan) | v | (South Korea) Jeonbuk Hyundai Motors |
| Gamba Osaka (Japan) | v | (Thailand) Port |

Matchday 6
| Home team | Score | Away team |
|---|---|---|
| Vissel Kobe (Japan) | v | (Australia) Newcastle Jets |
| Kashiwa Reysol (Japan) | v | (Vietnam) Công An Hà Nội |
| Pohang Steelers (South Korea) | v | (China) Shanghai Port |
| Johor Darul Ta'zim (Malaysia) | v | (South Korea) Daejeon Hana Citizen |
| Beijing Guoan (China) | v | (Thailand) Ratchaburi |
| Buriram United (Thailand) | v | (Japan) Kyoto Sanga |
| Jeonbuk Hyundai Motors (South Korea) | v | (Japan) Gamba Osaka |
| Port (Thailand) | v | (Japan) Kashima Antlers |

Matchday 7
| Home team | Score | Away team |
|---|---|---|
| Newcastle Jets (Australia) | v | (Malaysia) Johor Darul Ta'zim |
| Shanghai Port (China) | v | (Thailand) Port |
| Daejeon Hana Citizen (South Korea) | v | (Japan) Kashima Antlers |
| Kyoto Sanga (Japan) | v | (South Korea) Jeonbuk Hyundai Motors |
| Ratchaburi (Thailand) | v | (Japan) Gamba Osaka |
| Công An Hà Nội (Vietnam) | v | (China) Beijing Guoan |
| Vissel Kobe (Japan) | v | (South Korea) Pohang Steelers |
| Kashiwa Reysol (Japan) | v | (Thailand) Buriram United |

Matchday 8
| Home team | Score | Away team |
|---|---|---|
| Kashima Antlers (Japan) | v | (Thailand) Ratchaburi |
| Jeonbuk Hyundai Motors (South Korea) | v | (China) Shanghai Port |
| Buriram United (Thailand) | v | (Japan) Vissel Kobe |
| Johor Darul Ta'zim (Malaysia) | v | (Vietnam) Công An Hà Nội |
| Port (Thailand) | v | (Japan) Kyoto Sanga |
| Beijing Guoan (China) | v | (Australia) Newcastle Jets |
| Gamba Osaka (Japan) | v | (South Korea) Daejeon Hana Citizen |
| Pohang Steelers (South Korea) | v | (Japan) Kashiwa Reysol |

== Top scorers ==
Team eliminated for this round / inactive for this round / Matches voided by AFC / Player left the team

| Rank | Player | Team | MD1 | MD2 | MD3 | MD4 | MD5 | MD6 | MD7 | MD8 | R16-1 | R16-2 | QF | SF | F | Total |
|---|---|---|---|---|---|---|---|---|---|---|---|---|---|---|---|---|
| 1 | (Ghana) Prince Ampem | (China) Shanghai Port | 3 | 1 | 1 | 1 | | | | | | | | | | 6 |
| 2 | (Morocco) Houssine Rahimi | (United Arab Emirates) Al Ain | 2 | 2 | 1 | | | | | | | | | | | 5 |
| 3 | (Mexico) Julián Quiñones | (Saudi Arabia) Al-Qadsiah | 1 | | 1 | 2 | | | | | | | | | | 4 |
| 3 | (Serbia) Aleksandar Čavrić | (Japan) Kashima Antlers | 3 | | 1 | | | | | | | | | | | 4 |
| 3 | (Australia) Patrick Wood | (Australia) Newcastle Jets | 1 | | 2 | 1 | | | | | | | | | | 4 |
| 6 | (Madagascar) Njiva Rakotoharimalala | (Thailand) Ratchaburi | 3 | | | | | | | | | | | | | 3 |
| 6 | (Colombia) Brayan Perea | (Vietnam) Công An Hà Nội | 1 | | 2 | | | | | | | | | | | 3 |
| 6 | (Japan) Takashi Usami | (Japan) Gamba Osaka | 2 | | 1 | | | | | | | | | | | 3 |
| 6 | (Thailand) Bordin Phala | (Thailand) Port | | | | 3 | | | | | | | | | | 3 |
| 6 | (Albania) Jasir Asani | (Iran) Esteghlal | 1 | 1 | | 1 | | | | | | | | | | 3 |
| 6 | (England) Ollie Watkins | (Saudi Arabia) Al-Hilal | | 1 | | 2 | | | | | | | | | | 3 |

Note

- Goals scored in the qualifying play-offs and matches voided by AFC are not counted when determining top scorer (Regulations Article 64.4)

== See also ==
- 2026–27 AFC Champions League Two
- 2026–27 AFC Challenge League
- 2026–27 AFC Women's Champions League
