= China national football team results (2020–present) =

This article provides details of international football games played by the China national football team from 2020 to present.

== Results ==
Key
Win
Draw
Defeat

=== 2021 ===
30 May 2021 2022 World Cup qualification R2	Guam	0–7	China	Suzhou, China
19:30 UTC+8		Report	Wu Lei 20' (pen.), 55'; Jin Jingdao 39'; Wu Xi 61'; Elkeson 65'; Alan 83', 87'	Stadium: Suzhou Olympic Sports Centre; Attendance: 29,222; Referee: Sivakorn Pu-udom (Thailand)

7 June 2021 2022 World Cup qualification R2	China	2–0	Philippines	Sharjah, United Arab Emirates
21:00 UTC+4	Wu Lei 56' (pen.); Wu Xinghan 65'	Report		Stadium: Sharjah Stadium; Attendance: 0 Referee: Kim Hee-gon (South Korea)

11 June 2021 2022 World Cup qualification R2	China	5–0	Maldives	Sharjah, United Arab Emirates
21:00 UTC+4	Liu Binbin 5'; Wu Lei 30'; Alan 68'; Zhang Yuning 69'; Tan Long 79'	Report		Stadium: Sharjah Stadium; Attendance: 0 Referee: Ahmad Al-Ali (Kuwait)

15 June 2021 2022 World Cup qualification R2	China	3–1	Syria	Sharjah, United Arab Emirates
22:00 UTC+4	Zhang Xizhe 43'; Wu Lei 69' (pen.); Zhang Yuning 90+3'	Report	Aosman 50'	Stadium: Sharjah Stadium; Attendance: 0 Referee: Muhammad Taqi (Singapore)

2 September 2021 2022 World Cup qualification R3	Australia	3–0	China	Doha, Qatar
21:00 UTC+3	Mabil 24'; Boyle 26'; Duke 70'	Report		Stadium: Khalifa International Stadium; Attendance: 0 Referee: Ko Hyung-jin (South Korea)

7 September 2021 2022 World Cup qualification R3	China	0–1	Japan	Doha, Qatar
18:00 UTC+3		Report	Osako 40'	Stadium: Khalifa International Stadium; Attendance: 0 Referee: Nawaf Shukralla (Bahrain)

7 October 2021 2022 World Cup qualification R3	China	3–2	Vietnam	Sharjah, United Arab Emirates
21:00 UTC+4	Zhang Yuning 53'; Wu Lei 76', 90+5'	Report	Hồ Tấn Tài 81'; Nguyễn Tiến Linh 90+1'	Stadium: Sharjah Stadium; Attendance: 0 Referee: Mohammed Abdulla Hassan Mohamed (United Arab Emirates)

12 October 2021 2022 World Cup qualification R3	Saudi Arabia	3–2	China	Jeddah, Saudi Arabia
20:00 UTC+3	Al-Najei 15', 38'; Al-Buraikan 72'	Report	Aloísio 46'; Wu Xi 87'	Stadium: King Abdullah Sports City; Attendance: 54,124; Referee: Ilgiz Tantashev (Uzbekistan)

11 November 2021 2022 World Cup qualification R3	China	1–1	Oman	Sharjah, United Arab Emirates
19:00 UTC+4	Wu Lei 21'	Report	Al-Harthi 75'	Stadium: Sharjah Stadium; Attendance: 1,700; Referee: Sivakorn Pu-udom (Thailand)

16 November 2021 2022 World Cup qualification R3	China	1–1	Australia	Sharjah, United Arab Emirates
19:00 UTC+4	Wu Lei 71' (pen.)	Report	Duke 38'	Stadium: Sharjah Stadium; Referee: Adham Makhadmeh (Jordan)

=== 2022 ===
27 January 2022 2022 World Cup qualification R3	Japan	2–0	China	Saitama, Japan
19:00 UTC+9	Osako 13' (pen.); Ito 61'	Report		Stadium: Saitama Stadium 2002; Attendance: 11,753; Referee: Abdulrahman Al-Jassim (Qatar)

1 February 2022 2022 World Cup qualification R3	Vietnam	3–1	China	Hanoi, Vietnam
19:00 UTC+7	Hồ Tấn Tài 9'; Nguyễn Tiến Linh 16'; Phan Văn Đức 76'	Report	Xu Xin 90+7'	Stadium: Mỹ Đình National Stadium; Attendance: 6,099; Referee: Nawaf Shukralla (Bahrain)

24 March 2022 2022 World Cup qualification R3	China	1–1	Saudi Arabia	Sharjah, United Arab Emirates
19:00 UTC+4	Zhu Chenjie 82' (pen.)	Report	Al-Shehri 45+1'	Stadium: Sharjah Stadium; Attendance: 200; Referee: Mohammed Abdulla Hassan Mohamed (United Arab Emirates)

29 March 2022 2022 World Cup qualification R3	Oman	2–0	China	Muscat, Oman
20:00 UTC+4	Al-Alawi 12'; Fawaz 74'	Report		Stadium: Sultan Qaboos Sports Complex; Attendance: 2,500; Referee: Ko Hyung-jin (South Korea)

20 July 2022 2022 EAFF E-1 Football Championship	China	0–3	South Korea	Toyota, Japan
19:00 UTC+9		Report	Zhu Chenjie 39' (o.g.); Kwon Chang-hoon 54'; Cho Gue-sung 80'	Stadium: Toyota Stadium; Attendance: 200; Referee: Akhrol Riskullaev (Uzbekistan)

24 July 2022 2022 EAFF E-1 Football Championship	Japan	0–0	China	Toyota, Japan
19:20 UTC+9		Report		Stadium: Toyota Stadium; Attendance: 10,526; Referee: Nivon Robesh Gamini (Sri Lanka)

27 July 2022 2022 EAFF E-1 Football Championship	China	1–0	Hong Kong	Toyota, Japan
16:00 UTC+9	Tan Long 67'	Report		Stadium: Toyota Stadium; Attendance: 4,220; Referee: Mongkolchai Pechsri (Thailand)

=== 2023 ===
23 March 2023 Friendly	New Zealand	0–0	China	Auckland, New Zealand
19:00 UTC+13		Report		Stadium: Mount Smart Stadium; Attendance: 12,049; Referee: Sivakorn Pu-udom (Thailand)

26 March 2023 Friendly	New Zealand	2–1	China	Wellington, New Zealand
16:00 UTC+13	Zhu Chenjie 43' (o.g.); Garbett 81'		Ba Dun 90+2'	Stadium: Sky Stadium; Referee: Kim Woo-sung (South Korea)

16 June 2023 Friendly	China	4–0	Myanmar	Dalian, China
18:30 UTC+8	Zhang Linpeng 29'; Lin Liangming 35'; Wu Lei 75', 81'			Stadium: Dalian Barracuda Bay Football Stadium; Attendance: 27,651; Referee: Ryo Tanimoto (Japan)

20 June 2023 Friendly	China	2–0	Palestine	Dalian, China
19:35 UTC+8	Wu Lei 34'; Jiang Guangtai 65'			Stadium: Dalian Barracuda Bay Football Stadium; Attendance: 16,151; Referee: Yudai Yamamoto (Japan)

9 September 2023 Friendly	China	1–1	Malaysia	Chengdu, China
19:35 UTC+8	Lin Liangming 36'	Report	Faisal, 11'	Stadium: Chengdu Phoenix Hill Football Stadium; Attendance: 26,138; Referee: Abdulhadi Al-Ruaile (Qatar)

12 September 2023 Friendly	China	0–1	Syria	Chengdu, China
19:35 UTC+8		Report	Krouma 59'	Stadium: Chengdu Phoenix Hill Football Stadium; Attendance: 12,367; Referee: Sami Al-Jires (Saudi Arabia)

10 October 2023 Friendly	China	2–0	Vietnam	Dalian, China
19:35 UTC+8	Wang Qiuming 56'; Wu Lei 90+8'	Report		Stadium: Dalian Sports Centre Stadium; Referee: Woo Chun Sing (Hong Kong)

16 October 2023 Friendly	China	1–2	Uzbekistan	Dalian, China
19:35 UTC+8	Wei Shihao 41'	Report	Shukurov 78'; Iskanderov 86'	Stadium: Dalian Sports Centre Stadium; Attendance: 12,868; Referee: Tam Ping Wun (Hong Kong)

16 November 2023 2026 World Cup qualification R2 (Note: The 2026 FIFA World Cup qualification second round for the Asian Football Confederation also served as the 2027 AFC Asian Cup qualification second round.)	Thailand	1–2	China	Bangkok, Thailand
19:30 UTC+7	Sarach 23'	Report	Wu Lei 29'; Wang Shangyuan 74'	Stadium: Rajamangala Stadium; Attendance: 35,009; Referee: Salman Falahi (Qatar)

21 November 2023 2026 World Cup qualification R2	China	0–3	South Korea	Shenzhen, China
20:00 UTC+8		Report	Son Heung-min 11' (pen.), 45'; Jung Seung-hyun 87'	Stadium: Shenzhen Universiade Sports Centre Stadium; Attendance: 39,969; Referee: Abdulrahman Al-Jassim (Qatar)

29 December 2023 Friendly	China	0–2	Oman	Abu Dhabi, United Arab Emirates
19:15 UTC+4			A. Al-Alawi 49'; Mu. Al-Ghassani 65'	Stadium: Baniyas Stadium; Referee: Yahya Mohammed Ali Hassan Al-Mulla (United Arab Emirates)

=== 2024 ===
1 January 2024 Friendly	China	1–2	Hong Kong	Abu Dhabi, United Arab Emirates
17:30 UTC+4	Tan Long 9'	Report	Poon Pui Hin 51', 59'	Stadium: Baniyas Stadium; Attendance: 0 Referee: Yahya Mohammed Ali Hassan Al-Mulla (United Arab Emirates)

13 January 2024 2023 AFC Asian Cup	China	0–0	Tajikistan	Doha, Qatar
17:30 UTC+3		Report		Stadium: Abdullah bin Khalifa Stadium; Attendance: 4,001; Referee: Mohammed Al Hoish (Saudi Arabia)

17 January 2024 2023 AFC Asian Cup	Lebanon	0–0	China	Doha, Qatar
14:30 UTC+3		Report		Stadium: Al Thumama Stadium; Attendance: 14,137; Referee: Ko Hyung-jin (South Korea)

22 January 2024 2023 AFC Asian Cup	Qatar	1–0	China	Al Rayyan, Qatar
18:00 UTC+3	Al-Haydos 66'	Report		Stadium: Khalifa International Stadium; Attendance: 42,104; Referee: Abdullah Jamali (Kuwait)

21 March 2024 2026 World Cup qualification R2	Singapore	2–2	China	Kallang, Singapore
20:30 UTC+8	Ramli 53'; Mahler 81'	Report	Wu Lei 10', 45+2'	Stadium: National Stadium; Attendance: 28,414; Referee: Shaun Evans (Australia)

26 March 2024 2026 World Cup qualification R2	China	4–1	Singapore	Tianjin, China
20:00 UTC+8	Wu Lei 21', 85'; Fei Nanduo 65' (pen.); Wei Shihao 90'	Report	Ramli 22'	Stadium: Tianjin Olympic Centre Stadium; Attendance: 42,977; Referee: Omar Al-Ali (United Arab Emirates)

6 June 2024 2026 World Cup qualification R2	China	1–1	Thailand	Shenyang, China
20:00 UTC+8	Zhang Yuning 79'	Report	Supachok 20'	Stadium: Shenyang Olympic Sports Center Stadium; Attendance: 46,979; Referee: Ilgiz Tantashev (Uzbekistan)

11 June 2024 2026 World Cup qualification R2	South Korea	1–0	China	Seoul, South Korea
20:00 UTC+9	Lee Kang-in 61'	Report		Stadium: Seoul World Cup Stadium; Attendance: 64,935; Referee: Mohammed Al Hoish (Saudi Arabia)

5 September 2024 2026 World Cup qualification R3	Japan	7–0	China	Saitama, Japan
19:35 UTC+9	Endo 12'; Mitoma 45+2'; Minamino 52', 58'; Itō 77'; Maeda 87'; Kubo 90+5'	Report		Stadium: Saitama Stadium 2002; Attendance: 52,398; Referee: Abdulrahman Al-Jassim (Qatar)

10 September 2024 2026 World Cup qualification R3	China	1–2	Saudi Arabia	Dalian, China
20:00 UTC+8	Lajami 14' (o.g.)	Report	Kadesh 39', 90'	Stadium: Dalian Suoyuwan Football Stadium; Attendance: 48,628; Referee: Nasrullo Kabirov (Tajikistan)

10 October 2024 2026 World Cup qualification R3	Australia	3–1	China	Adelaide, Australia
19:40 UTC+10:30	Miller 45+2'; Goodwin 53'; Velupillay 90+2'	Report	Xie Wenneng 20'	Stadium: Adelaide Oval; Attendance: 46,291; Referee: Nazmi Nasaruddin (Malaysia)

15 October 2024 2026 World Cup qualification R3	China	2–1	Indonesia	Qingdao, China
--:-- UTC+8	Abduweli 21'; Zhang Yuning 44'	Report	Haye 86'	Stadium: Qingdao Youth Football Stadium; Attendance: 37,133; Referee: Omar Al-Ali (United Arab Emirates)

14 November 2024 2026 World Cup qualification R3	Bahrain	0–1	China	Riffa, Bahrain
17:00 UTC+3		Report	Zhang Yuning 90+1'	Stadium: Bahrain National Stadium; Attendance: 7,921; Referee: Adham Makhadmeh (Jordan)

19 November 2024 2026 World Cup qualification R3	China	1–3	Japan	Xiamen, China
20:00 UTC+8	Lin Liangming 48'	Report	Ogawa 39', 54'; Itakura 45+6'	Stadium: Xiamen Egret Stadium; Attendance: 45,336; Referee: Muhammad Taqi (Singapore)

=== 2025 ===
20 March 2025 2026 World Cup qualification R3	Saudi Arabia	1–0	China	Riyadh, Saudi Arabia
21:15 UTC+3	S. Al-Dawsari 50'	Report		Stadium: King Saud University Stadium; Attendance: 24,742; Referee: Omar Al-Ali (United Arab Emirates)

25 March 2025 2026 World Cup qualification R3	China	0–2	Australia	Hangzhou, China
22:00 UTC+8		Report	J. Irvine 16'; N. Velupillay 29'	Stadium: Hangzhou Olympic Sports Center Stadium; Attendance: 70,588; Referee: Mooud Bonyadifard (IR Iran)

5 June 2025 2026 World Cup qualification R3	Indonesia	1–0	China	Jakarta, Indonesia
20:45 UTC+7	Romeny 45' (pen.)	Report		Stadium: Gelora Bung Karno Stadium; Attendance: 69,661; Referee: Rustam Lutfullin (Uzbekistan)

10 June 2025 2026 World Cup qualification R3	China	1–0	Bahrain	Chongqing, China
19:00 UTC+8	Wang Yudong 90+4' (pen.)	Report		Stadium: Longxing Football Stadium; Attendance: 51,236; Referee: Adel Al-Naqbi (United Arab Emirates)

7 July 2025 2025 EAFF E-1 Football Championship	South Korea	3–0	China	Yongin, South Korea
20:00 UTC+9	Lee Dong-gyeong 8'; Joo Min-kyu 21'; Kim Ju-sung 56'	Report		Stadium: Yongin Mireu Stadium; Attendance: 4,426; Referee: Tuan Yaasin (Malaysia)

12 July 2025 2025 EAFF E-1 Football Championship	Japan	2–0	China	Yongin, South Korea
19:24 UTC+9	Hosoya 11'; Mochizuki 63'	Report		Stadium: Yongin Mireu Stadium; Attendance: 1,661; Referee: Sivakorn Pu-udom (Thailand)

15 July 2025 2025 EAFF E-1 Football Championship	China	1–0	Hong Kong	Yongin, South Korea
16:00 UTC+9	Huang Zhengyu 20'	Report		Stadium: Yongin Mireu Stadium; Attendance: 1,423; Referee: Ngo Duy Lan (Vietnam)

=== 2026 ===
27 March 2026 2026 FIFA Series	China	2–0	Curaçao	Sydney, Australia
17:00 UTC+11	Wei Shihao 45+2'; Zhang Yuning 59'	Report		Stadium: Stadium Australia; Attendance: 7,578; Referee: Alex King (Australia)

31 March 2026 2026 FIFA Series	Cameroon	2–0	China	Melbourne, Australia
17:00 UTC+11	Etta Eyong 3'; Alioum 9'	Report		Stadium: Melbourne Rectangular Stadium; Attendance: 16,764; Referee: Alireza Faghani (Australia)

5 June 2026 Friendly	Singapore	1–2	China	Kallang, Singapore
19:30 UTC+8	I. Fandi 76'	Report	Serginho 16'; Zhang Yuning 41' (pen.)	Stadium: Jalan Besar Stadium; Attendance: 4,688; Referee: Rustam Lutfullin (Uzbekistan)

9 June 2026 Friendly	China	0–0	Thailand	Jinhua, China
19:35 UTC+8		Report		Stadium: Jinhua Stadium; Attendance: 27,005; Referee: Ko Hyung-jin (South Korea)

== Results by year ==
As of 10 June after the match against Bahrain.

Year	M	W	D	L	GF	GA	GD
2020	0	0	0	0	0	0	0
2021	10	5	2	3	24	12	+12
2022	7	1	2	4	3	11	-8
2023	11	4	2	5	13	12	+1
2024	14	3	4	7	14	24	-10
2025	4	1	0	3	1	4	-3
Total	46	14	10	22	55	63	-8

== Head to head records ==
As of 9 June 2026 after the match against Thailand.

Head to head records
Opponent	P	W	D	L	GF	GA	W%	D%	L%
Australia	4	0	1	3	2	9	0	25	75
Bahrain	2	2	0	0	2	0	100	0	0
Cameroon	1	1	0	0	0	2	100	0	0
Curaçao	1	1	0	0	2	0	100	0	0
Guam	1	1	0	0	7	0	100	0	0
Hong Kong	3	2	0	1	3	2	66.67	0	33.33
Indonesia	2	1	0	1	2	2	50	0	50
Japan	6	0	1	5	1	15	0	16.67	83.33
Lebanon	1	0	1	0	0	0	0	100	0
Malaysia	1	0	1	0	1	1	0	100	0
Maldives	1	1	0	0	5	0	100	0	0
Myanmar	1	1	0	0	4	0	100	0	0
New Zealand	2	0	1	1	1	2	0	50	50
Oman	3	0	1	2	1	5	0	33.33	66.67
Palestine	1	1	0	0	2	0	100	0	0
Philippines	1	1	0	0	2	0	100	0	0
Qatar	1	0	0	1	0	1	0	0	100
Saudi Arabia	4	0	1	3	4	7	0	25	75
Singapore	3	2	1	0	8	4	66.67	33.33	0
South Korea	4	0	0	4	0	10	0	0	100
Syria	2	1	0	1	3	2	50	0	50
Tajikistan	1	0	1	0	0	0	0	100	0
Thailand	3	1	2	0	3	2	33.33	66.67	0
Uzbekistan	1	0	0	1	1	2	0	0	100
Vietnam	3	2	0	1	6	5	66.67	0	33.33
Totals	46	15	11	20	57	61	32.61	23.91	43.48

== See also ==
- China national football team results and fixtures
