= Hong Kong national football team results (2020–present) =

This article provides details of international football games played by the Hong Kong national football team from 2020 to present.

== Results ==
Key
Win
Draw
Defeat

=== 2020 ===
No matches were played in 2020.

=== 2021 ===
3 June 2022 FIFA World Cup; Qualification 2nd round Group C	Hong Kong	1–3	Iran	Arad, Bahrain
17:30 UTC+3	Orr 85'	Report	Gholizadeh 23'; Amiri 61'; Ansarifard 84'	Stadium: Al Muharraq Stadium; Referee: Adham Makhadmeh (Jordan)

11 June 2022 FIFA World Cup; Qualification 2nd round Group C	Hong Kong	0–1	Iraq	Arad, Bahrain
19:30 UTC+3		Report	Fung Hing Wa 13' (o.g.)	Stadium: Al Muharraq Stadium; Referee: Hiroyuki Kimura (Japan)

15 June 2022 FIFA World Cup; Qualification 2nd round Group C	Bahrain	4–0	Hong Kong	Riffa, Bahrain
19:30 UTC+3	Saeed 49'; Isa 54' (pen.), 70'; Abdullatif 90' (pen.)	Report		Stadium: Bahrain National Stadium; Referee: Yaqoob Abdul Baki (Oman)

=== 2022 ===
1 June International Friendly	Malaysia	2–0	Hong Kong	Kuala Lumpur, Malaysia
21:00 UTC+8	Safawi 31' (pen.); Safiq 90+1'	Report		Stadium: Bukit Jalil National Stadium

8 June 2023 AFC Asian Cup qualification 3rd round Group D	Hong Kong	2–1	Afghanistan	Kolkata, India
17:00 UTC+5:30	Wong Wai 23'; Orr 27'	Report	Noor 81'	Stadium: Salt Lake Stadium; Attendance: 1,115; Referee: Ahmed Al-Ali (Jordan)

11 June 2023 AFC Asian Cup qualification 3rd round Group D	Cambodia	0–3	Hong Kong	Kolkata, India
17:00 UTC+5:30		Report	Orr 20'; Sun Ming Him 22'; Chan Siu Kwan 63'	Stadium: Salt Lake Stadium; Attendance: 1,078; Referee: Yousif Saeed Hasan (Iraq)

14 June 2023 AFC Asian Cup qualification 3rd round Group D	India	4–0	Hong Kong	Kolkata, India
20:30 UTC+5:30	Ali 1'; Chhetri 45+1'; M. Singh 85'; Pandita 90+3'	Report		Stadium: Salt Lake Stadium; Attendance: 48,216; Referee: Qasim Al-Hatmi (Oman)

19 July 2022 EAFF E-1 Football Championship	Japan	6–0	Hong Kong	Ibaraki, Japan
19:20 UTC+9	Soma 2', 55'; Machino 20', 57'; Nishimura 22', 40'	Report		Stadium: Kashima Stadium; Attendance: 4,980; Referee: Hassan Akrami (Iran)

24 July 2022 EAFF E-1 Football Championship	South Korea	3–0	Hong Kong	Toyota, Japan
16:00 UTC+9	Kang Seong-jin 17', 86'; Hong Chul 74'	Report		Stadium: Toyota Stadium; Attendance: 4,335; Referee: Nazmi Nasaruddin (Malaysia)

27 July 2022 EAFF E-1 Football Championship	China	1–0	Hong Kong	Toyota, Japan
16:00 UTC+9	Tan Long 67'	Report		Stadium: Toyota Stadium; Attendance: 4,220; Referee: Mongkolchai Pechsri (Thailand)

21 September International Friendly	Hong Kong	2–0	Myanmar	Mong Kok, Hong Kong
20:00 UTC+8	Sun Ming Him 34'; Law Tsz Chun 35'	Report		Stadium: Mong Kok Stadium; Attendance: 0 Referee: Sultan Mohamed Saleh Yousif Al-Hammadi (United Arab Emirates)

24 September International Friendly	Hong Kong	0–0	Myanmar	So Kon Po, Hong Kong
20:00 UTC+8		Report		Stadium: Hong Kong Stadium; Attendance: 12,264; Referee: Jumpei Iida (Japan)

=== 2023 ===
23 March International Friendly	Hong Kong	1–1	Singapore	Mong Kok, Hong Kong
20:00 UTC+8	Tan 43' (o.g.)	Report	Tan 20'	Stadium: Mong Kok Stadium; Attendance: 5,910; Referee: Songkran Bunmeekiart (Thailand)

28 March International Friendly	Malaysia	2–0	Hong Kong	Johor, Malaysia
22:00 UTC+8	Akhyar 18'; Faisal 40'			Stadium: Sultan Ibrahim Stadium; Attendance: 4,593; Referee: Mongkolchai Pechsri (Thailand)

15 June International Friendly	Vietnam	1–0	Hong Kong	Hai Phong, Vietnam
19:30 UTC+7	Quế Ngọc Hải 32' (pen.)			Stadium: Lạch Tray Stadium; Attendance: 19,689; Referee: Suhaizi Shukri (Malaysia)

19 June International Friendly	Hong Kong	0–1	Thailand	So Kon Po, Hong Kong
20:00 UTC+8			Teerasil 63'	Stadium: Hong Kong Stadium; Attendance: 13,434; Referee: Jansen Foo (Singapore)

7 September International Friendly	Cambodia	1–1	Hong Kong	Phnom Penh, Cambodia
19:00 UTC+7	Sophanat 90'		Everton 21'	Stadium: National Olympic Stadium

11 September International Friendly	Hong Kong	10–0	Brunei	So Kon Po, Hong Kong
20:00 UTC+8	Everton 12', 59'; Tan Chun Lok 20'; Hélio 41'; Fernando 51'; Wong Wai 56'; Chan Siu Kwan 64', 83'; Poon Pui Hin 84', 87'			Stadium: Hong Kong Stadium; Attendance: 6,097; Referee: Warintorn Sassadee (Thailand)

12 October 2026 FIFA World Cup; Qualification 1st round 1st leg	Hong Kong	4–0	Bhutan	So Kon Po, Hong Kong
20:00 UTC+8	Udebuluzor 10', 16'; Chan 28'; Norbu 35' (o.g.)	Report		Stadium: Hong Kong Stadium; Attendance: 10,259; Referee: Razlan Joffri Ali (Malaysia)

17 October 2026 FIFA World Cup; Qualification 1st round 1st leg	Bhutan	2–0	Hong Kong	Thimphu, Bhutan
18:00 UTC+6	Gyeltshen 28'; Chogyal 47'	Report		Stadium: Changlimithang Stadium; Referee: Thoriq Alkatiri (Indonesia)

16 November 2026 FIFA World Cup; Qualification 2nd round Group E	Iran	4–0	Hong Kong	Tehran, Iran
18:00 UTC+3:30	Azmoun 12', 15'; Taremi 87'; Rezaeian 90+2'	Report		Stadium: Azadi Stadium; Attendance: 6,191; Referee: Nazmi Nasaruddin (Malaysia)

21 November 2026 FIFA World Cup; Qualification 2nd round Group E	Hong Kong	2–2	Turkmenistan	So Kon Po, Hong Kong
20:00 UTC+8	Wong Wai 12'; Camargo 65'	Report	Mingazow 4', 36'	Stadium: Hong Kong Stadium; Attendance: 6,601; Referee: Adel Al-Naqbi (United Arab Emirates)

=== 2024 ===
1 January International Friendly	China	1–2	Hong Kong	Abu Dhabi, United Arab Emirates
17:30 UTC+4	Tan Long 9'		Liu Yang 51' (o.g.); Poon Pui Hin 60'	Stadium: Baniyas Stadium; Attendance: 0 Referee: Yahya Mohammed Ali Hassan Al-Mulla (United Arab Emirates)

14 January 2023 AFC Asian Cup; Group C	United Arab Emirates	3–1	Hong Kong	Al Rayyan, Qatar
17:30 UTC+3	Adil 34' (pen.); Sultan 53'; Al-Ghassani 90+6' (pen.)	Report	Chan Siu Kwan 49'	Stadium: Khalifa International Stadium; Attendance: 15,586; Referee: Muhammad Taqi (Singapore)

19 January 2023 AFC Asian Cup; Group C	Hong Kong	0–1	Iran	Al Rayyan, Qatar
20:30 UTC+3		Report	Ghayedi 24'	Stadium: Khalifa International Stadium; Attendance: 36,412; Referee: Hanna Hattab (Syria)

23 January 2023 AFC Asian Cup; Group C	Hong Kong	0–3	Palestine	Doha, Qatar
18:00 UTC+3			Dabbagh 12', 60'; Qunbar 48'	Stadium: Abdullah bin Khalifa Stadium; Attendance: 6,568; Referee: Shaun Evans (Australia)

21 March 2026 FIFA World Cup; Qualification 2nd round Group E	Hong Kong	0–2	Uzbekistan	Mong Kok, Hong Kong
20:00 UTC+8		Report (FIFA); Report (AFC)	Shomurodov 49'; Ashurmatov 66'	Stadium: Mong Kok Stadium; Attendance: 6,263; Referee: Kim Woo-sung (South Korea)

26 March 2026 FIFA World Cup; Qualification 2nd round Group E	Uzbekistan	3–0	Hong Kong	Tashkent, Uzbekistan
19:30 UTC+5	Shomurodov 20'; Erkinov 63'; Urunov 70'	Report (FIFA); Report (AFC)		Stadium: Milliy Stadium; Referee: Ahmed Faisal Al-Ali (Jordan)

6 June 2026 FIFA World Cup; Qualification 2nd round Group E	Hong Kong	2–4	Iran	So Kon Po, Hong Kong
20:00 UTC+8	Ma Hei Wai 14'; Pinto 59'	Report	Taremi 12' (pen.), 34' (pen.), 56'; Azmoun 65'	Stadium: Hong Kong Stadium; Attendance: 9,992; Referee: Qasim Al-Hatmi (Oman)

11 June 2026 FIFA World Cup; Qualification 2nd round Group E	Turkmenistan	0–0	Hong Kong	Ashgabat, Turkmenistan
20:00 UTC+5		Report		Stadium: Ashgabat Stadium; Attendance: 10,324; Referee: Hussein Abo Yehia (Lebanon)

5 September International Friendly	Solomon Islands	0–3	Hong Kong	Suva, Fiji
19:00 UTC+12			Juninho 22'; Orr 45+1' (pen.); Wong Wai 47' (pen.)	Stadium: HFC Bank Stadium; Referee: Torika Delai (Fiji)

8 September International Friendly	Hong Kong	1–1	Fiji	Lautoka, Fiji
15:00 UTC+12	Orr 77'	Report	Radrigai 18'	Stadium: Churchill Park; Referee: David Yareboinen (Papua New Guinea)

10 October International Friendly	Liechtenstein	1–0	Hong Kong	Vaduz, Liechtenstein
19:30 UTC+2	Hasler 16'	Report		Stadium: Rheinpark Stadion; Referee: Désirée Grundbacher (Switzerland)

15 October International Friendly	Hong Kong	3–0	Cambodia	So Kon Po, Hong Kong
20:00 UTC+8	Orr 29'; Everton 35'; Juninho 90+2'	Report		Stadium: Hong Kong Stadium; Attendance: 5,289; Referee: Hoang Ngoc Ha (Vietnam)

14 November International Friendly	Hong Kong	3–1	Philippines	So Kon Po, Hong Kong
20:00 UTC+8	Orr 44', 90+6'; Everton 83'	Report	Kristensen 48'	Stadium: Hong Kong Stadium; Attendance: 4,966; Referee: Warintorn Sassadee (Thailand)

19 November International Friendly	Hong Kong	1–0	Mauritius	Mong Kok, Hong Kong
20:00 UTC+8	Everton 11'	Report		Stadium: Mong Kok Stadium; Attendance: 4,937; Referee: Torphong Somsing (Thailand)

8 December 2025 EAFF E-1 Football Championship preliminary	Mongolia	0–3	Hong Kong	Mong Kok, Hong Kong
18:00 UTC+8		Report	Everton 24'; Wong Wai 35'; Benavides 60'	Stadium: Mong Kok Stadium; Attendance: 3,329; Referee: Wiwat Jumpaoon (Thailand)

14 December 2025 EAFF E-1 Football Championship preliminary	Hong Kong	2–1	Chinese Taipei	Mong Kok, Hong Kong
20:00 UTC+8	Orr 19'; Tsui Wang Kit 87'	Report	Yu Yao-hsing 29'	Stadium: Mong Kok Stadium; Attendance: 5,637; Referee: Chae Sang-hyeop (South Korea)

17 December 2025 EAFF E-1 Football Championship preliminary	Guam	0–5	Hong Kong	So Kon Po, Hong Kong
20:00 UTC+8		Report	Chan Siu Kwan 2', 53'; Benavides 12'; Everton 50'; Dudu 78'	Stadium: Hong Kong Stadium; Attendance: 8,236; Referee: Wiwat Jumpaoon (Thailand)

=== 2025 ===
19 March International Friendly	Hong Kong	2–0	Macau	Mong Kok, Hong Kong
20:00 UTC+8	Jones 26'; Merkies 40'	Report		Stadium: Mong Kok Stadium; Attendance: 5,464; Referee: Hoang Ngoc Ha (Vietnam)

25 March 2027 AFC Asian Cup qualification 3rd round Group C	Singapore	0–0	Hong Kong	Kallang, Singapore
20:30 UTC+8				Stadium: National Stadium; Attendance: 8,064; Referee: Chae Sang-hyeop (South Korea)

5 June International Friendly	Hong Kong	0–0	Nepal	So Kon Po, Hong Kong
20:00 UTC+8		Report		Stadium: Hong Kong Stadium; Attendance: 6,092; Referee: Mongkolchai Pechsri (Thailand)

10 June 2027 AFC Asian Cup qualification 3rd round Group C	Hong Kong	1–0	India	Kai Tak, Hong Kong
20:00 UTC+8	Pereira 90+4' (pen.)	Report		Stadium: Kai Tak Stadium; Attendance: 42,570; Referee: Alaedin Ahmad (Lebanon)

8 July 2025 EAFF E-1 Football Championship	Japan	6–1	Hong Kong	Yongin, South Korea
19:24 UTC+9	Germain 4', 10', 22', 26'; Inagaki 20'; Nakamura 90+4'	Report	Orr 59'	Stadium: Yongin Mireu Stadium; Attendance: 687; Referee: Thoriq Alkatiri (Indonesia)

11 July 2025 EAFF E-1 Football Championship	Hong Kong	0–2	South Korea	Yongin, South Korea
20:00 UTC+9		Report	Kang Sang-yoon 27'; Lee Ho-jae 67'	Stadium: Yongin Mireu Stadium; Attendance: 5,521; Referee: Ahmad A'Qashah (Singapore)

15 July 2025 EAFF E-1 Football Championship	China	1–0	Hong Kong	Yongin, South Korea
16:00 UTC+9	Huang Zhengyu 20'	Report		Stadium: Yongin Mireu Stadium; Attendance: 1,423; Referee: Ngo Duy Lan (Vietnam)

4 September 2025 King's Cup	Iraq	2–1	Hong Kong	Kanchanaburi, Thailand
16:00 UTC+7	Ali 67', 80'	Report	Orr 61' (pen.)	Stadium: Kanchanaburi Province Stadium; Referee: Mongkolchai Pechsri (Thailand)

7 September 2025 King's Cup	Fiji	0–8	Hong Kong	Kanchanaburi, Thailand
16:00 UTC+7		Report	Yu Joy Yin 18', 42'; Juninho 27', 45'; Merkies 40'; Ayman 50' (o.g.); Everton 74'; Chan Siu Kwan 77'	Stadium: Kanchanaburi Province Stadium; Attendance: 3,275; Referee: Torphong Somsing (Thailand)

9 October 2027 AFC Asian Cup qualification 3rd round Group C	Bangladesh	3–4	Hong Kong	Dhaka, Bangladesh
20:00 UTC+6	Choudhury 13'; Morsalin 84'; Shome 90+9'	Report; Report (AFC)	Camargo 45+4'; Merkies 50', 75', 90+11'	Stadium: National Stadium; Attendance: 22,343; Referee: Saud Al Samhan (Kuwait)

14 October 2027 AFC Asian Cup qualification 3rd round Group C	Hong Kong	1–1	Bangladesh	Kai Tak, Hong Kong
20:00 UTC+8	Orr 36' (pen.)	Report; Report (AFC)	Rakib 84'	Stadium: Kai Tak Stadium; Attendance: 45,489; Referee: Hiroki Kasahara (Japan)

13 November Friendly	Hong Kong	1–1	Cambodia	So Kon Po, Hong Kong
20:00 UTC+8	Wong Wai 31'	Report	Krya 33'	Stadium: Hong Kong Stadium; Attendance: 7,480; Referee: Lê Vũ Linh (Vietnam)

18 November 2027 AFC Asian Cup qualification 3rd round Group C	Hong Kong	1–2	Singapore	Kai Tak, Hong Kong
20:00 UTC+8	Orr 15'	Report	Anuar 64'; Fandi 67'	Stadium: Kai Tak Stadium; Attendance: 47,762; Referee: Sivakorn Pu-udom (Thailand)

=== 2026 ===
31 March 2027 AFC Asian Cup qualification 3rd round Group C	India	2–1	Hong Kong	Kochi, India
19:00 UTC+5:30	Williams 4'; Mishra 50'	Report; Report (AFC)	Camargo 65'	Stadium: Jawaharlal Nehru International Stadium; Attendance: 22,690; Referee: Songkran Bunmeekiart (Thailand)

5 June Friendly	Hong Kong	2–0	Mongolia	So Kon Po, Hong Kong
20:00 UTC+8	Juninho 5'; Ng Yu Hei 81'	Report		Stadium: Hong Kong Stadium; Attendance: 6,016; Referee: Hoàng Ngọc Hà (Vietnam)

9 June Friendly	Cambodia	2–0	Hong Kong	Phnom Penh, Cambodia
19:00 UTC+7	Ogawa 45+1'; Chanthea 50'	Report		Stadium: Olympic Stadium; Attendance: 20,685; Referee: Yudi Nurcahya (Indonesia)

27 September 2026 FIFA ASEAN Challenge Cup Group A	Hong Kong	4–0	Laos	Kai Tak, Hong Kong
15:00 UTC+8	Sun Ming Him 12'; Camargo 33'; Dudu 55'; Orr 90+1' (pen.)	FIFA Report; GSA Report		Stadium: Kai Tak Stadium; Attendance: 18,873; Referee: Sanzhar Zhakypbekov (Kyrgyzstan)

30 September 2026 FIFA ASEAN Challenge Cup Group A	Hong Kong	2–0	Brunei	Kai Tak, Hong Kong
20:00 UTC+8	Chan Siu Kwan 60'; Orr 90+1'	FIFA Report; GSA Report		Stadium: Kai Tak Stadium; Attendance: 20,116; Referee: Abdullo Davlatov (Tajikistan)

3 October 2026 FIFA ASEAN Challenge Cup Final	Hong Kong	2–0	Cambodia	Kai Tak, Hong Kong
18:00 UTC+8	Orr 41'; Camargo 58' (pen.)	FIFA Report		Stadium: Kai Tak Stadium; Attendance: 31,374; Referee: Sanzhar Zhakypbekov (Kyrgyzstan)
