= Japan national football team results (2020–present) =

International football games played by Japan

This article provides details of international football games played by the Japan national football team from 2020 to present.

== Results ==
Key
Win
Draw
Defeat

=== 2020 ===
27 March 2020 Friendly	Japan	Cancelled	South Africa	Kyoto

31 March 2020 Friendly	Japan	Cancelled	Ivory Coast	Niigata

9 October 2020 Friendly	Japan	0–0	Cameroon	Utrecht, Netherlands
14:00 UTC+2		Report		Stadium: Stadion Galgenwaard; Referee: Bas Nijhuis (Netherlands)

13 October 2020 Friendly	Japan	1–0	Ivory Coast	Utrecht, Netherlands
16:45 UTC+2	Ueda 90+1'	Report		Stadium: Stadion Galgenwaard; Referee: Jochem Kamphuis (Netherlands)

13 November 2020 Friendly	Japan	1–0	Panama	Graz, Austria
15:15 UTC+1	Minamino 61' (pen.)	Report		Stadium: Liebenauer Stadium; Referee: Christian-Petru Ciochirca (Austria)

17 November 2020 Friendly	Japan	0–2	Mexico	Graz, Austria
21:00 UTC+1		Report	Jiménez 63'; Lozano 68'	Stadium: Liebenauer Stadium; Referee: Manuel Schüttengruber (Austria)

=== 2021 ===
25 March 2021 Friendly	Japan	3–0	South Korea	Yokohama, Japan
19:20 UTC+9	Yamane 16'; Kamada 27'; Endo 83'	Report		Stadium: Nissan Stadium; Referee: Rowan Arumughan (India)

30 March 2021 2022 World Cup qualification	Mongolia	0–14	Japan	Chiba, Japan
19:20 UTC+9		Report	Minamino 13'; Osako 23', 55', 90+2'; Kamada 26'; Morita 33'; Tuya 39' (o.g.); Inagaki 68', 90+3'; Ito 73', 79'; Furuhashi 78', 87'; Asano 90+1'	Stadium: Fukuda Denshi Arena; Attendance: 0 Referee: Omar Mohamed Al-Ali (United Arab Emirates)

28 May 2021 2022 World Cup qualification	Japan	10–0	Myanmar	Chiba, Japan
19:30 UTC+9	Minamino 8', 66'; Osako 22', 30' (pen.), 36', 49', 88'; Morita 56'; Kamada 84'; Itakura 90'	Report		Stadium: Fukuda Denshi Arena; Attendance: 0 Referee: Hasan Akrami (Iran)

7 June 2021 2022 World Cup qualification	Japan	4–1	Tajikistan	Suita, Japan
19:30 UTC+9	Furuhashi 6'; Minamino 40'; Hashimoto 51'; Kawabe 70'	Report	Panjshanbe 9'	Stadium: Panasonic Stadium; Attendance: 0 Referee: Abdulrehman Al Jassim (Qatar)

11 June 2021 Kirin Challenge Cup	Japan	1–0	Serbia	Kobe, Japan
19:25 UTC+9	Ito 48'	Report		Stadium: Noevir Stadium Kobe; Referee: Payam Heidari (Iran)

15 June 2021 2022 World Cup qualification	Japan	5–1	Kyrgyzstan	Suita, Japan
19:30 UTC+9	Onaiwu 27' (pen.), 31', 33'; Sasaki 72'; Asano 77'	Report	Murzaev 45+2' (pen.)	Stadium: Panasonic Stadium; Attendance: 0 Referee: Omar Al-Yaqoubi (Oman)

2 September 2021 2022 World Cup qualification	Japan	0–1	Oman	Suita, Japan
19:15 UTC+9		Report	Al-Sabhi 88'	Stadium: Suita City Football Stadium; Referee: Mohammed Abdulla Hassan Mohamed (United Arab Emirates)

7 September 2021 2022 World Cup qualification	China	0–1	Japan	Doha, Qatar
18:00 UTC+3		Report	Osako 40'	Stadium: Khalifa International Stadium; Attendance: 0 Referee: Nawaf Shukralla (Bahrain)

7 October 2021 2022 World Cup qualification	Saudi Arabia	1–0	Japan	Jeddah, Saudi Arabia
20:00 UTC+3	Al-Buraikan 71'	Report		Stadium: King Abdullah Sports City; Attendance: 51,218; Referee: Adham Makhadmeh (Jordan)

12 October 2021 2022 World Cup qualification	Japan	2–1	Australia	Saitama, Japan
19:14 UTC+9	Tanaka 8'; Behich 85' (o.g.)	Report	Hrustic 70'	Stadium: Saitama Stadium 2002; Attendance: 14,437; Referee: Abdulrahman Al-Jassim (Qatar)

11 November 2021 2022 World Cup qualification	Vietnam	0–1	Japan	Hanoi, Vietnam
19:00 UTC+7		Report	Ito 17'	Stadium: Mỹ Đình National Stadium; Attendance: 11,022; Referee: Mohammed Abdulla Hassan Mohamed (United Arab Emirates)

16 November 2021 2022 World Cup qualification	Oman	0–1	Japan	Muscat, Oman
20:00 UTC+4		Report	Ito 81'	Stadium: Sultan Qaboos Sports Complex; Referee: Ko Hyung-jin (South Korea)

=== 2022 ===
27 January 2022 2022 World Cup qualification	Japan	2–0	China	Saitama, Japan
19:00 UTC+9	Osako 13' (pen.); Ito 61'	Report		Stadium: Saitama Stadium 2002; Referee: Abdulrahman Al-Jassim (Qatar)

1 February 2022 2022 World Cup qualification	Japan	2–0	Saudi Arabia	Saitama, Japan
19:10 UTC+9	Minamino 32'; Ito 50'	Report		Stadium: Saitama Stadium 2002; Attendance: 19,118; Referee: Ko Hyung-jin (South Korea)

24 March 2022 2022 World Cup qualification	Australia	0–2	Japan	Sydney, Australia
20:10 UTC+11		Report	Mitoma 89', 90+4'	Stadium: Stadium Australia; Attendance: 41,852; Referee: Nawaf Shukralla (Bahrain)

29 March 2022 2022 World Cup qualification	Japan	1–1	Vietnam	Saitama, Japan
19:35 UTC+9	Yoshida 55'	Report	Nguyễn Thanh Bình 19'	Stadium: Saitama Stadium 2002; Attendance: 44,600; Referee: Ilgiz Tantashev (Uzbekistan)

2 June 2022 Kirin Challenge Cup	Japan	4–1	Paraguay	Sapporo, Japan
19:00 UTC+9	Asano 36'; Kamada 42'; Mitoma 60'; Tanaka 85'	Report	González 59'	Stadium: Sapporo Dome; Attendance: 24,511; Referee: Chris Beath (Australia)

6 June 2022 Kirin Challenge Cup	Japan	0–1	Brazil	Tokyo, Japan
19:20 UTC+9		Report	Neymar 77' (pen.)	Stadium: Japan National Stadium; Attendance: 63,638; Referee: Alireza Faghani (Iran)

10 June 2022 2022 Kirin Cup Soccer	Japan	4–1	Ghana	Kobe, Japan
18:55 UTC+9	Yamane 29'; Mitoma 45+1'; Kubo 73'; Maeda 82'	Report	J. Ayew 43'	Stadium: Noevir Stadium Kobe; Attendance: 25,100; Referee: Ams Kurt (Australia)

14 June 2022 2022 Kirin Cup Soccer	Japan	0–3	Tunisia	Osaka, Japan
18:55 UTC+9		Report	Ben Romdhane 55' (pen.); Sassi 76'; Jebali 90+3'	Stadium: Panasonic Stadium Suita; Attendance: 31,292; Referee: Ahmed Eisa Darwish (United Arab Emirates)

19 July 2022 EAFF E-1 Football Championship	Japan	6–0	Hong Kong	Ibaraki, Japan
19:20 UTC+9	Soma 2', 55'; Machino 20', 57'; Nishimura 22', 40'	Report		Stadium: Kashima Soccer Stadium; Attendance: 4,980; Referee: Hassan Akrami (Iran)

24 July 2022 EAFF E-1 Football Championship	Japan	0–0	China	Toyota, Japan
19:20 UTC+9		Report		Stadium: Toyota Stadium; Attendance: 10,526; Referee: Nivon Robesh Gamini (Sri Lanka)

27 July 2022 EAFF E-1 Football Championship	Japan	3–0	South Korea	Toyota, Japan
19:20 UTC+9	Soma 48'; Sasaki 63'; Machino 72'	Report		Stadium: Toyota Stadium; Attendance: 14,117; Referee: Akhrol Riskullaev (Uzbekistan)

23 September 2022 2022 Kirin Challenge Cup	Japan	2–0	United States	Düsseldorf, Germany
14:25 UTC+2	Kamada 24'; Mitoma 88'	Report (JFA); Report (Soccerway)		Stadium: Merkur Spiel-Arena; Attendance: 5,149; Referee: Felix Zwayer (Germany)

27 September 2022 2022 Kirin Challenge Cup	Japan	0–0	Ecuador	Düsseldorf, Germany
13:55 UTC+2		Report (JFA); Report (Soccerway)		Stadium: Merkur Spiel-Arena; Referee: Sascha Stegemann (Germany)

17 November 2022 Friendly	Canada	2–1	Japan	Dubai, United Arab Emirates
17:40 UTC+4	Vitória 21'; Cavallini 90+5' (pen.)	Report (JFA); Report (Soccerway)	Soma 9'	Stadium: Al-Maktoum Stadium; Referee: Omar Mohamed Al Ali (United Arab Emirates)

23 November 2022 2022 World Cup	Germany	1–2	Japan	Doha, Qatar
16:00 UTC+3	Gündoğan 33' (pen.)	Report	Dōan 75'; Asano 83'	Stadium: Khalifa International Stadium; Attendance: 42,608; Referee: Iván Barton (El Salvador)

27 November 2022 2022 World Cup	Japan	0–1	Costa Rica	Al Rayyan, Qatar
13:00 UTC+3		Report	Fuller 81'	Stadium: Ahmad bin Ali Stadium; Attendance: 41,479; Referee: Michael Oliver (England)

1 December 2022 2022 World Cup	Japan	2–1	Spain	Doha, Qatar
22:00 UTC+3	Dōan 48'; Tanaka 51'	Report	Morata 11'	Stadium: Khalifa International Stadium; Attendance: 44,851; Referee: Victor Gomes (South Africa)

5 December 2022 2022 World Cup R16	Japan	1–1 (a.e.t.) (1–3 p)	Croatia	Al Wakrah, Qatar
18:00 UTC+3	Maeda 43'	Report	Perišić 55'	Stadium: Al Janoub Stadium; Attendance: 42,523; Referee: Ismail Elfath (United States)
	Penalties
	Minamino (penalty missed); Mitoma (penalty missed); Asano (penalty scored); Yoshida (penalty missed)		(penalty scored) Vlašić; (penalty scored) Brozović; (penalty missed) Livaja; (penalty scored) Pašalić

=== 2023 ===
24 March 2023 2023 Kirin Challenge Cup	Japan	1–1	Uruguay	Tokyo, Japan
19:30 UTC+9	Nishimura 75'	Report	Valverde 38'	Stadium: Japan National Stadium; Attendance: 61,855; Referee: Ko Hyung-jin (South Korea)

28 March 2023 2023 Kirin Challenge Cup	Japan	1–2	Colombia	Osaka, Japan
19:20 UTC+9	Mitoma 3'	Report	Durán 33'; Borré 61'	Stadium: Yodoko Sakura Stadium; Attendance: 20,005; Referee: Muhammad Taqi (Singapore)

15 June 2023 2023 Kirin Challenge Cup	Japan	6–0	El Salvador	Toyota, Japan
19:10 UTC+9	Taniguchi 1'; Ueda 4' (pen.); Kubo 25'; Dōan 44'; Nakamura 60'; Furuhashi 73'	Report		Stadium: Toyota Stadium; Attendance: 37,403; Referee: Andrew Madley (England)

20 June 2023 2023 Kirin Challenge Cup	Japan	4–1	Peru	Suita, Japan
18:55 UTC+9	H. Ito 22'; Mitoma 37'; J. Itō 63'; Maeda 75'	Report	Gonzáles 83'	Stadium: Panasonic Stadium Suita; Attendance: 35,001; Referee: Khamis Al-Marri (Qatar)

9 September 2023 Friendly	Germany	1–4	Japan	Wolfsburg, Germany
20:45 UTC+2	Sané 19'	Report	J. Itō 11'; Ueda 22'; Asano 90'; Tanaka 90+2'	Stadium: Volkswagen Arena; Attendance: 24,980; Referee: João Pinheiro (Portugal)

12 September 2023 Friendly	Japan	4–2	Turkey	Genk, Belgium
14:20 UTC+2	A. Ito 15'; Nakamura 28', 36'; J. Ito 78'	Report	Kabak 44'; Yıldırım 61'	Stadium: Cegeka Arena; Attendance: 7,002; Referee: Allard Lindhout (Netherlands)

13 October 2023 2023 Mizuho Blue Dream Match	Japan	4–1	Canada	Niigata, Japan
19:35 UTC+9	Tanaka 2', 49'; Davies 40' (o.g.); Nakamura 42'	Report	Hoilett 89'	Stadium: Denka Big Swan Stadium; Referee: Alex King (Australia)

17 October 2023 2023 Kirin Challenge Cup	Japan	2–0	Tunisia	Kobe, Japan
19:10 UTC+9	Furuhashi 43'; J. Ito 69'	Report		Stadium: Noevir Stadium Kobe; Attendance: 26,529; Referee: Wang Di (China)

16 November 2023 2026 FIFA WCQ AFC 2R	Japan	5–0	Myanmar	Suita, Japan
19:00 UTC+9	Ueda 11', 45+4', 50'; Kamada 28'; Dôan 86'	Report		Stadium: Panasonic Stadium Suita; Attendance: 34,484; Referee: Muhammad Taqi (Singapore)

21 November 2023 2026 FIFA WCQ AFC 2R	Syria	0–5	Japan	Jeddah, Saudi Arabia
17:45 UTC+3		Report	Kubo 32'; Ueda 37', 40'; Sugawara 47'; Hosoya 82'	Stadium: Prince Abdullah Al Faisal Stadium; Attendance: 6,130; Referee: Ma Ning (China)

=== 2024 ===
1 January 2024 Friendly	Japan	5–0	Thailand	Tokyo, Japan
	Tanaka 50'; Nakamura 72'; Dolah 75' (o.g.); Kawamura 82'; Minamino 90+1'			Stadium: Japan National Stadium; Attendance: 61,916; Referee: Kim Sung-woo (Korea)

9 January 2024 Friendly	Japan	6–1 (Note: Not recognised as international "A" match.)	Jordan	Doha, Qatar
		Report		Stadium: Al Ersal

14 January 2024 2023 Asian Cup GS	Japan	4–2	Vietnam	Doha, Qatar
14:30	Minamino 11', 45'; Nakamura 45+4'; Ueda 85'	Report	Nguyễn Đình Bắc 16'; Phạm Tuấn Hải 33'	Stadium: Al Thumama Stadium; Referee: Kim Jong-Hyeok (South Korea)

19 January 2024 2023 Asian Cup GS	Iraq	2–1	Japan	Al Rayyan, Qatar
14:30 UTC+3	Hussein 5', 45+4'	Report	Endo 90+3'	Stadium: Education City Stadium; Attendance: 38,663; Referee: Khalid Al Turais (Saudi Arabia)

24 January 2024 2023 Asian Cup GS	Japan	3–1	Indonesia	Doha, Qatar
14:30	Ueda 6' (pen.), 52'; Hubner 88' (o.g.)	Report	Walsh 90+1'	Stadium: Al Thumama Stadium; Attendance: 26,453; Referee: Khamis Al Marri (Qatar)

31 January 2024 2023 AFC Asian Cup R16	Bahrain	1–3	Japan	Doha, Qatar
14:30 UTC+3	Suzuki 64' (o.g.)	Report	Doan 31'; Kubo 49'; Ueda 72'	Stadium: Al Thumama Stadium; Attendance: 31,832; Referee: Ahmad Al-Ali (Kuwait)

3 February 2024 2023 AFC Asian Cup QF	Iran	2–1	Japan	Al Rayyan, Qatar
14:30 UTC+3	Mohebi 55'; Jahanbakhsh 90+6' (pen.)	Report	Morita 28'	Stadium: Education City Stadium; Referee: Ma Ning (China)

21 March 2024 2026 World Cup qualification	Japan	1–0	North Korea	Tokyo, Japan
19:20 UTC+9	Tanaka 2'	Report		Stadium: Japan National Stadium; Attendance: 59,354; Referee: Adel Al-Naqbi (United Arab Emirates)

26 March 2024 2026 World Cup qualification	North Korea	0–3; Awarded (Note: North Korea were originally scheduled to play host to Japan in Kim Il-sung Stadium. However, North Korea then decided against hosting it due to "a malignant infectious disease" spreading in Japan. Due to the time gap and North Korea's inability to provide an alternative venue, FIFA subsequently decided that the match shall neither be played nor rescheduled, and the matter will be decided by FIFA Disciplinary Committee. It was later announced that Japan would be awarded a 3–0 victory by forfeit.)	Japan
		Report

6 June 2024 2026 World Cup qualification	Myanmar	0–5	Japan	Yangon, Myanmar
18:40 UTC+6:30		Report	Nakamura 17', 90+3'; Dōan 34'; Ogawa 75', 83'	Stadium: Thuwunna Stadium; Referee: Majed Al-Shamrani (Saudi Arabia)

11 June 2024 2026 World Cup qualification	Japan	5–0	Syria	Hiroshima, Japan
19:14 UTC+9	Ueda 13'; Dōan 19'; Krouma 21' (o.g.); Soma 73' (pen.); Minamino 85'	Report (FIFA); Report (AFC)		Stadium: Edion Peace Wing Hiroshima; Attendance: 26,650; Referee: Ahmad Al-Ali (Kuwait)

5 September 2024 2026 World Cup qualification 3R	Japan	7–0	China	Saitama, Japan
19:35 UTC+9	Endo 12'; Mitoma 45+2'; Minamino 52', 58'; Itō 77'; Maeda 87'; Kubo 90+5'	Report		Stadium: Saitama Stadium 2002; Attendance: 52,398; Referee: Abdulrahman Al-Jassim (Qatar)

10 September 2024 2026 World Cup qualification 3R	Bahrain	0–5	Japan	Riffa, Bahrain
19:00 UTC+3		Report	Ueda 37' (pen.), 47'; Morita 61', 64'; Ogawa 81'	Stadium: Bahrain National Stadium; Attendance: 22,729; Referee: Rustam Lutfullin (Uzbekistan)

10 October 2024 2026 World Cup qualification 3R	Saudi Arabia	0–2	Japan	Jeddah, Saudi Arabia
21:00 UTC+3		Report	Kamada 14'; Ogawa 81'	Stadium: King Abdullah Sports City Stadium; Attendance: 56,283; Referee: Kim Jyeok-Min (South Korea)

15 October 2024 2026 World Cup qualification 3R	Japan	1–1	Australia	Saitama, Japan
19:35 UTC+9	Burgess 76' (o.g.)	Report	Taniguchi 58' (o.g.)	Stadium: Saitama Stadium 2002; Attendance: 58,730; Referee: Ahmed Al-Ali (Kuwait)

15 November 2024 2026 World Cup qualification 3R	Indonesia	0–4	Japan	Jakarta, Indonesia
19:00 UTC+7		Report	Hubner 36' (o.g.); Minamino 40'; Morita 49'; Sugawara 69'	Stadium: Gelora Bung Karno Stadium; Attendance: 60,304; Referee: Mooud Bonyadifard (Iran)

19 November 2024 2026 World Cup qualification 3R	China	1–3	Japan	Xiamen, China
20:00 UTC+8	Lin Liangming 48'	Report	Ogawa 39', 54'; Itakura 45+6'	Stadium: Xiamen Egret Stadium; Attendance: 45,336; Referee: Muhammad Taqi (Singapore)

=== 2025 ===
20 March 2025 FIFA World Cup qualification 3R	Japan	2–0	Bahrain	Saitama, Japan
19:35 UTC+9	Kamada 66'; Kubo 87'	Report		Stadium: Saitama Stadium 2002; Attendance: 58,137; Referee: Abdulrahman Al-Jassim (Qatar)

25 March 2025 FIFA World Cup qualification 3R	Japan	0–0	Saudi Arabia	Saitama, Japan
19:35 UTC+9		Report		Stadium: Saitama Stadium 2002; Attendance: 58,003; Referee: Ahmed Al-Ali (Kuwait)

5 June 2025 FIFA World Cup qualification 3R	Australia	1–0	Japan	Perth, Australia
19:10 UTC+8	Behich 90'	Report		Stadium: Perth Stadium; Attendance: 57,226; Referee: Qasim Al-Hatmi (Oman)

10 June 2025 FIFA World Cup qualification 3R	Japan	6–0	Indonesia	Suita, Japan
19:35 UTC+9	Kamada 15', 45+6'; Kubo 19'; Morishita 55'; Machino 58'; Hosoya 80'	Report		Stadium: Suita City Football Stadium; Attendance: 33,661; Referee: Kim Jong-hyeok (South Korea)

8 July 2025 EAFF E-1 Championship	Japan	6–1	Hong Kong	Yongin, South Korea
19:24 UTC+9	Germain 4', 10', 22', 26'; Inagaki 20'; Nakamura 90+4'	Report	Orr 59'	Stadium: Yongin Mireu Stadium; Attendance: 687; Referee: Thoriq Alkatiri (Indonesia)

12 July 2025 EAFF E-1 Championship	Japan	2–0	China	Yongin, South Korea
19:24 UTC+9	Hosoya 11'; Mochizuki 63'	Report		Stadium: Yongin Mireu Stadium; Attendance: 1,661; Referee: Sivakorn Pu-udom (Thailand)

15 July 2025 EAFF E-1 Championship	South Korea	0–1	Japan	Yongin, South Korea
19:24 UTC+9		Report	Germain 8'	Stadium: Yongin Mireu Stadium; Attendance: 18,418; Referee: Tuan Yaasin (Malaysia)

6 September 2025 Friendly	Mexico	0–0	Japan	Oakland, United States
19:00 UTC−7	Montes (red card) 90+2'	Report		Stadium: Oakland Coliseum; Attendance: 45,278; Referee: Rubiel Vazquéz (United States)

9 September 2025 Friendly	United States	2–0	Japan	Columbus, United States
19:30 UTC−4	Zendejas 30'; Balogun 64'	Report		Stadium: Lower.com Field; Attendance: 20,192; Referee: Bryan Lopez (Guatemala)

10 October 2025 Kirin Challenge Cup	Japan	2–2	Paraguay	Suita, Japan
19:20 UTC+9	Ogawa 26'; Ueda 90+4'	Report	Almirón 20'; D. Gómez 64'	Stadium: Suita City Football Stadium; Attendance: 34,169; Referee: Ko Hyung-jin (South Korea)

14 October 2025 Kirin Challenge Cup	Japan	3–2	Brazil	Chōfu, Japan
19:30 UTC+9	Minamino 52'; Nakamura 62'; Ueda 71'	Report	Paulo Henrique 26'; Martinelli 32'	Stadium: Ajinomoto Stadium; Attendance: 44,920; Referee: Kim Jong-hyeok (South Korea)

14 November 2025 Kirin Challenge Cup	Japan	2–0	Ghana	Toyota, Japan
19:20 UTC+9	Minamino 16'; Dōan 60'	Report		Stadium: Toyota Stadium; Attendance: 40,030; Referee: Ben Abraham (Australia)

18 November 2025 Kirin Challenge Cup	Japan	3–0	Bolivia	Tokyo, Japan
19:15 UTC+9	Kamada 4'; Machino 72'; Nakamura 78'	Report		Stadium: Japan National Stadium; Attendance: 53,508; Referee: Fu Ming (China)

=== 2026 ===
28 March 2026 Kirin World Challenge 2026	Scotland	0–1	Japan	Glasgow, Scotland
17:00 UTC+0		Report	J. Itō 84'	Stadium: Hampden Park; Attendance: 44,644; Referee: Shaun Evans (Australia)

31 March 2026 Kirin World Challenge 2026	England	0–1	Japan	London, England
19:45 UTC+1		Report	Mitoma 23'	Stadium: Wembley Stadium; Attendance: 79,233; Referee: Nick Walsh (Scotland)

31 May 2026 Kirin Challenge Cup 2026	Japan	1–0	Iceland	Tokyo, Japan
	Ogawa 87'			Stadium: National Stadium; Attendance: 62,212; Referee: Damian Kos (Poland)

14 June 2026 2026 FIFA World Cup Group F	Netherlands	2–2	Japan	Arlington, United States
15:00 UTC−5	van Dijk 51'; Summerville 64'	Report	Nakamura 57'; Kamada 88'	Stadium: AT&T Stadium; Attendance: 69,285; Referee: Ismail Elfath (United States)

20 June 2026 2026 FIFA World Cup Group F	Tunisia	0–4	Japan	Guadalupe, Mexico
22:00 UTC−6		Report	Kamada 4'; Ueda 31', 83'; J. Itō 69'	Stadium: Estadio BBVA; Attendance: 51,243; Referee: István Kovács (Romania)

25 June 2026 2026 FIFA World Cup Group F	Japan	1–1	Sweden	Arlington, United States
18:00 UTC−5	Maeda 56'	Report	Elanga 62'	Stadium: AT&T Stadium; Attendance: 70,137; Referee: Iván Barton (El Salvador)

29 June 2026 2026 FIFA World Cup Round of 32	Brazil	2–1	Japan	Houston, United States
12:00 UTC−5	Casemiro 56'; Martinelli 90+6'	Report	Sano 29'	Stadium: Houston Stadium; Attendance: 68,777; Referee: Maurizio Mariani (Italy)

24 September Kirin Challenge Cup 2026	Japan	3 - 1	Uruguay	Rifu, Japan
19:05 UTC+9	Matsuki 11'; Shiogai 90+2'; Ueda 90+6'	Source	Araújo 42'	Stadium: Q&A Stadium; Attendance: 44,070; Referee: Alex King (Australia)

28 September 2026 Kirin Challenge Cup 2026	Japan	2–1	Venezuela	Hiroshima, Japan
19:25 UTC+9	Ueda 49', 90+6' (pen.)	Source	Kelsy 46'	Stadium: Edion Peace Wing Hiroshima; Referee: Tim Danaskos (Australia)

1 October 2026 2026 Kirin Cup Soccer Semi-finals	Japan	0–0 (5–4 p)	Ecuador	Yokohama, Japan
19:10 UTC+9		Source		Stadium: Nissan Stadium; Referee: Wiwat Jumpaoon (Thailand)
	Penalties
	Ueda (penalty scored); Kamada (penalty scored); H. Itō (penalty scored); Sōma (penalty scored); Maeda (penalty scored)		(penalty scored) J. Caicedo; (penalty scored) Minda; (penalty missed) Castillo; (penalty scored) Sarmiento; (penalty scored) Valencia

5 October 2026 2026 Kirin Cup Soccer Final	Japan	2–1	New Zealand	Tokyo, Japan
19:30 UTC+9	Ueda 28'; Dōan 71'	Report	Old 32'	Stadium: National Stadium; Referee: Nazmi Nasaruddin (Malaysia)

14 November Mizuho Blue Challenge - The Kallang Football Series Singapore	Japan	3–2	Brazil	Kallang, Singapore
18:15 UTC+8	Kubo 15'; Nakamura 19'; Sakamoto 90+1'	Report	Vinícius 33', 75'	Stadium: National Stadium; Referee: Jansen Foo (Singapore)

17 November 2026 Mizuho Blue Challenge - The Kallang Football Series Singapore	Japan	v	Paraguay	Kallang, Singapore
21:10 UTC+8				Stadium: National Stadium

30 December 2026 Kirin Challenge Cup 2026	Japan	Cancelled	Vietnam	Suita, Japan
--:-- UTC+9				Stadium: Suita City Football Stadium
Note: The match was cancelled following the postponement of the 2027 AFC Asian Cup.

=== 2027 ===
25 March 2027 Kirin Challenge Cup 2027	Japan	v	TBD	Hiroshima, Japan
--:-- UTC+9				Stadium: Edion Peace Wing Hiroshima

30 March 2027 Kirin Challenge Cup 2027	Japan	v	TBD	Tokyo, Japan
--:-- UTC+9				Stadium: National Stadium

TBA 2027 AFC Asian Cup Group F	Japan	v	Indonesia	Jeddah, Saudi Arabia
				Stadium: Prince Abdullah Al-Faisal Sports City Stadium

TBA 2027 AFC Asian Cup Group F	Thailand	v	Japan	Riyadh, Saudi Arabia
				Stadium: Al Shabab Stadium

TBA 2027 AFC Asian Cup Group F	Japan	v	Qatar	Riyadh, Saudi Arabia
				Stadium: Imam Mohammed Ibn Saud University Stadium

== Head-to-head record ==
As of 24 September 2026 after the match against the Uruguay.

Opponent	Pld	W	D	L	GF	GA	GD	Win %
Australia	4	2	1	1	5	3	+2	50.00
Bahrain	3	3	0	0	10	1	+9	100.00
Bolivia	1	1	0	0	3	0	+3	100.00
Brazil	3	1	0	2	4	5	−1	33.33
Cameroon	1	0	1	0	0	0	+0	0.00
Canada	2	1	0	1	5	3	+2	50.00
China	6	5	1	0	15	1	+14	83.33
Colombia	1	0	0	1	1	2	−1	0.00
Costa Rica	1	0	0	1	0	1	−1	0.00
Croatia	1	0	1	0	1	1	+0	0.00
Ecuador	1	0	1	0	0	0	+0	0.00
El Salvador	1	1	0	0	6	0	+6	100.00
England	1	1	0	0	1	0	+1	100.00
Germany	2	2	0	0	6	2	+4	100.00
Ghana	2	2	0	0	6	1	+5	100.00
Hong Kong	2	2	0	0	12	1	+11	100.00
Iceland	1	1	0	0	1	0	+1	100.00
Indonesia	3	3	0	0	13	1	+12	100.00
Iran	1	0	0	1	1	2	−1	0.00
Iraq	1	0	0	1	1	2	−1	0.00
Ivory Coast	1	1	0	0	1	0	+1	100.00
Kyrgyzstan	1	1	0	0	5	1	+4	100.00
Mexico	2	0	1	1	0	2	−2	0.00
Mongolia	1	1	0	0	14	0	+14	100.00
Myanmar	3	3	0	0	20	0	+20	100.00
Netherlands	1	0	1	0	2	2	+0	0.00
North Korea	2	2	0	0	4	0	+4	100.00
Oman	2	1	0	1	1	1	+0	50.00
Panama	1	1	0	0	1	0	+1	100.00
Paraguay	2	1	1	0	6	3	+3	50.00
Peru	1	1	0	0	4	1	+3	100.00
Saudi Arabia	4	2	1	1	4	1	+3	50.00
Scotland	1	1	0	0	1	0	+1	100.00
Serbia	1	1	0	0	1	0	+1	100.00
South Korea	3	3	0	0	7	0	+7	100.00
Spain	1	1	0	0	2	1	+1	100.00
Sweden	1	0	1	0	1	1	+0	0.00
Syria	2	2	0	0	10	0	+10	100.00
Tajikistan	1	1	0	0	4	1	+3	100.00
Thailand	1	1	0	0	5	0	+5	100.00
Tunisia	3	2	0	1	6	3	+3	66.67
Turkey	1	1	0	0	4	2	+2	100.00
United States	2	1	0	1	2	2	+0	50.00
Uruguay	2	1	1	0	4	2	+2	50.00
Vietnam	3	2	1	0	6	3	+3	66.67
Total	77	54	11	12	197	48	+149	70.13
