= Joo Min-kyu =

South Korean footballer

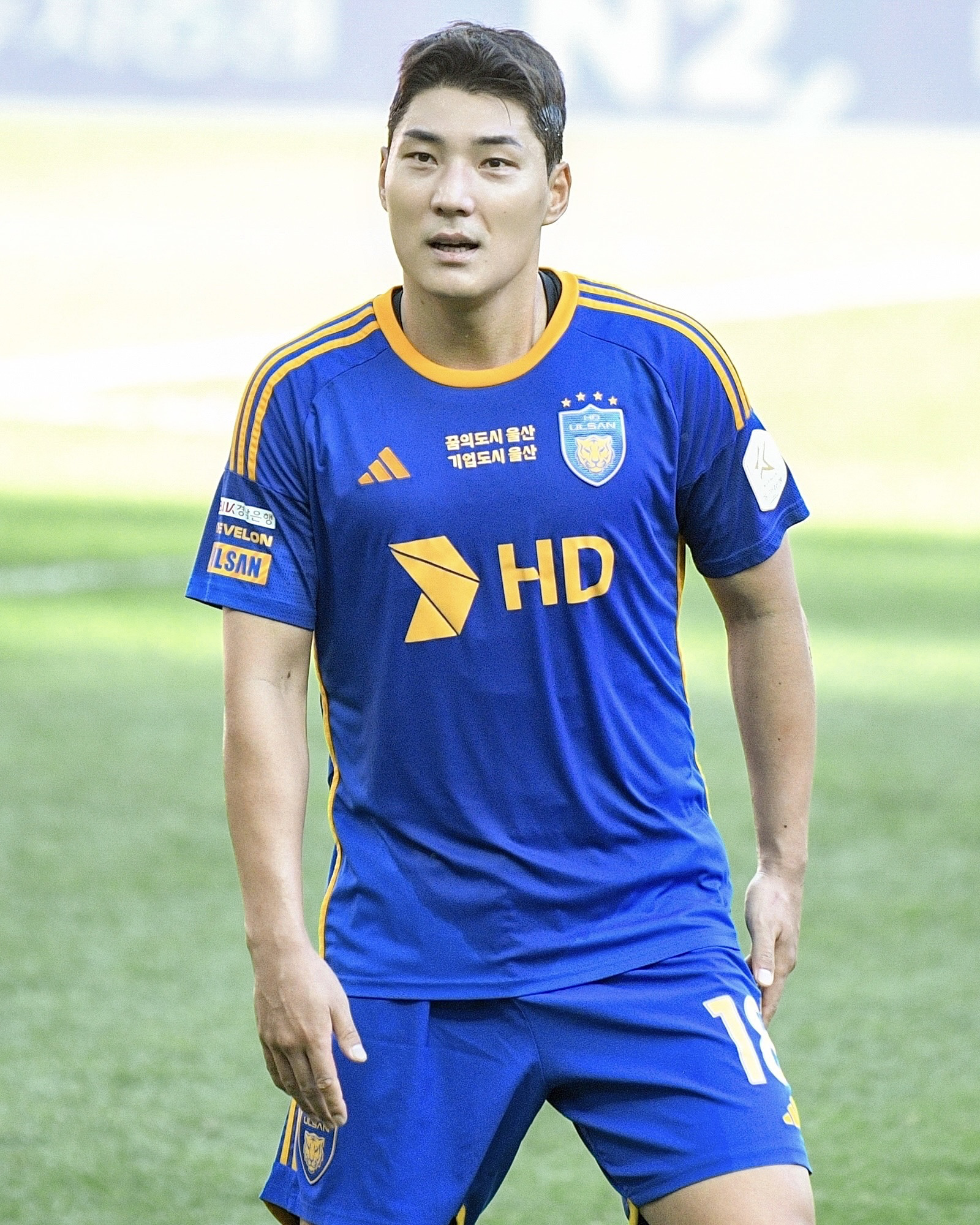
- Joo in 2024

Personal information
- Date of birth: 13 April 1990 (age 36)
- Place of birth: Cheongju, South Korea
- Height: 1.83 m (6 ft 0 in)
- Position: Striker

Team information
- Current team: Daejeon Hana Citizen
- Number: 10

Youth career
- 2006: Boin High School
- 2007–2008: Daeshin High School

College career
Years	Team	Apps	(Gls)
2009–2012	Hanyang University		

Senior career*
Years	Team	Apps	(Gls)
2013–2014	Goyang Hi	56	(7)
2015–2018	Seoul E-Land	71	(37)
2017–2018	→ Sangju Sangmu (draft)	43	(21)
2019	Ulsan Hyundai	28	(5)
2020–2022	Jeju United	89	(47)
2023–2024	Ulsan HD	69	(27)
2025–	Daejeon Hana Citizen	52	(16)

International career^{‡}
2015–	South Korea	11	(3)
- * Club domestic league appearances and goals as of 21 July 2026 ‡ National team caps and goals as of 15 July 2025

Joo Min-kyu (Korean: 주민규; born 13 April 1990) is a South Korean football player who play as a striker for Daejeon Hana Citizen and the South Korea national team.

== Club career ==
=== Goyang Hi ===
Joo was selected by Goyang Hi in the 2014 K League Challenge draft after graduating from Hanyang University.

=== Seoul E-Land ===
On 8 January 2015, Joo moved to Seoul E-Land.

==== Sangju Sangmu (loan) ====
On 5 December 2016, Joo was loaned out to Sangju Sangmu.

=== Ulsan Hyundai ===
On 4 January 2019, Joo moved to Korean giants, Ulsan Hyundai.

=== Jeju United ===
On 6 February 2020, Joo moved to Jeju United. He helped the club to win the 2020 K League 2 thus gaining promotion to the K League 1.

In the next season, Joo was the 2021 K League 1 top scorer with 22 goals helping his club to finished in fourth place. Joo was than named in the K League Best XI in the 2021 and 2022 season.

=== Return to Ulsan Hyundai ===
On 4 January 2023, Joo returned to Ulsan Hyundai. He helped the club to win the 2023 K League 1 while finishing as the league joint top scorer with Tiago Orobó (17 goals). He was also named in the K League Best XI for the third consecutive time.

=== Daejeon Hana Citizen ===
On 6 January 2025, Joo signed to fellow K League 1 club, Daejeon Hana Citizen for 2025 season.

== International career ==
Joo made his debut for the South Korea national team on 21 March 2024 in a 2026 FIFA World Cup qualifier against Thailand in a 3−0 win at the Rajamangala Stadium. On 6 June 2024, He recorded a hat-trick of assists and scoring his first goal for South Korea in a 7–0 thrashing win against Singapore at the Singapore National Stadium.

== Career statistics ==
=== Club ===
As of match played 21 July 2026.

Appearances and goals by club, season and competition
Club	Season	League			Korean FA Cup		Asia		Other		Total	
Club	Season	Division	Apps	Goals	Apps	Goals	Apps	Goals	Apps	Goals	Apps	Goals
Goyang Hi	2013	K League 2	26	2	2	0	—		—		28	2
Goyang Hi	2014	K League 2	30	5	1	0	—		—		31	5
Goyang Hi	Total		56	7	3	0	—		—		59	7
Seoul E-Land	2015	K League 2	39	23	2	2	—		1 (Note: Appearances in K League promotion-relegation play-offs)	0	42	25
Seoul E-Land	2016	K League 2	29	14	1	0	—		—		30	14
Seoul E-Land	2018	K League 2	3	0	0	0	—		—		3	0
Seoul E-Land	Total		71	37	3	2	—		1	0	75	39
Sangju Sangmu (draft)	2017	K League 1	32	17	1	0	—		2	0	35	17
Sangju Sangmu (draft)	2018	K League 1	11	4	0	0	—		—		11	4
Sangju Sangmu (draft)	Total		43	21	1	0	—		2	0	46	21
Ulsan Hyundai	2019	K League 1	28	5	1	0	4 (Note: Appearances in AFC Champions League (Elite))	1	—		33	6
Jeju United	2020	K League 2	18	8	0	0	—		—		18	8
Jeju United	2021	K League 1	34	22	0	0	—		—		34	22
Jeju United	2022	K League 1	37	17	2	2	—		—		39	19
Jeju United	Total		89	47	2	2	—		—		91	49
Ulsan HD	2023	K League 1	36	17	2	0	3	0	—		41	17
Ulsan HD	2024	K League 1	33	10	4	1	11	4	—		48	15
Ulsan HD	Total		69	27	6	1	14	4	—		89	32
Daejeon Hana Citizen	2025	K League 1	34	14	1	1	—		—		35	15
Daejeon Hana Citizen	2026	K League 1	18	2	0	0	0	0	1 (Note: Appearance in K League Super Cup)	0	19	2
Daejeon Hana Citizen	Total		52	16	1	1	0	0	1	0	54	17
Career total			408	160	17	6	18	5	4	0	447	171

=== International ===
Scores and results list South Korea's goal tally first.

List of international goals scored by Joo Min-kyu
No.	Date	Venue	Opponent	Score	Result	Competition
1	6 June 2024	National Stadium, Kallang, Singapore	Singapore	2–0	7–0	2026 FIFA World Cup qualification
2	10 September 2024	Sultan Qaboos Sports Complex, Muscat, Oman	Oman	3–1	3–1	2026 FIFA World Cup qualification
3	7 July 2025	Yongin Mireu Stadium, Yongin, South Korea	China	2–0	3–0	2025 EAFF Championship

== Honours ==
Jeju United

- K League 2: 2020

Ulsan HD

- K League 1: 2023, 2024

Individual

- K League 1 top scorer: 2021, 2023
- K League 1 Best XI: 2021, 2022, 2023
