= Kang Sang-yoon =

South Korean footballer (born 2004)

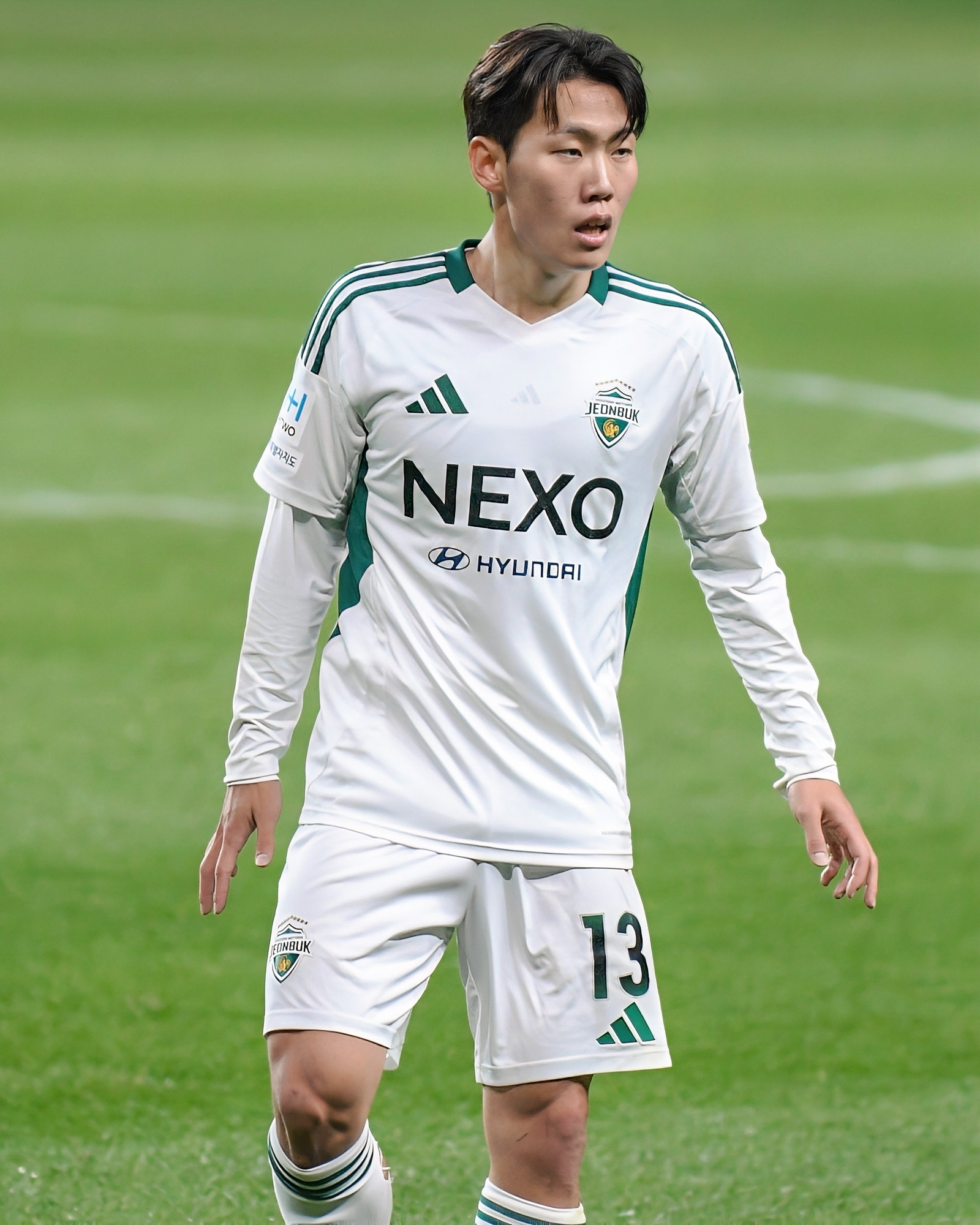
- Kang in 2025

Personal information
- Date of birth: 31 May 2004 (age 22)
- Place of birth: Jeju, South Korea
- Height: 1.71 m (5 ft 7 in)
- Position: Midfielder

Team information
- Current team: Jeonbuk Hyundai Motors
- Number: 13

Youth career
- 2014–2016: Jeju Oedo Elementary School
- 2017–2019: Geumsan Middle School
- 2020–2023: Yeongsaeng High School

Senior career*
Years	Team	Apps	(Gls)
2022–2023	Jeonbuk Hyundai Motors B	17	(2)
2022–	Jeonbuk Hyundai Motors	77	(1)
2023	→ Busan IPark (loan)	15	(0)
2024	→ Suwon FC (loan)	29	(3)

International career^{‡}
2018	South Korea U14	7	(0)
2019–2020	South Korea U17	9	(0)
2022–2023	South Korea U20	20	(2)
2024–	South Korea U23	13	(0)
2025–	South Korea	3	(1)
Medal record
Men's football
Representing South Korea
Asian Games
Gold medal – first place	2026 Aichi–Nagoya
- * Club domestic league appearances and goals as of 8 November 2026 ‡ National team caps and goals as of 3 October 2026

- Kang Sang-yoon
- Hangul: 강상윤
- Hanja: 姜尙潤
- RR: Gang Sangyun
- MR: Kang Sangyun

Kang Sang-yoon (Korean: 강상윤; born 31 May 2004) is a South Korean footballer who currently plays as a midfielder for Jeonbuk Hyundai Motors and the South Korea national team.

== Club career ==
Affiliated with the club since 2017, while also attending the Geumsan Middle School and Yeongsaeng High School, Kang signed a semi-professional contract with Jeonbuk Hyundai Motors in March 2022. He made his debut in the 2022 K League 1 on 5 May 2022, being named as a surprise starter in an eventual 1–1 draw with FC Seoul. Ahead of the following season, he was registered as a full professional.

== International career ==
Having represented South Korea from under-14 to under-19 level, Kang was called up to the under-20 squad for the 2023 FIFA U-20 World Cup. Following South Korea's last group game, a 0–0 draw with the Gambia which assured them qualification to the round of 16, Kang gave an interview with Korean press, stating that he needed to improve and that their next opponents, Ecuador, were a fast and strong team, but that South Korea should be able to win.

== Career statistics ==
=== Club ===
As of matches played 8 November 2026

Appearances and goals by club, season and competition
Club	Season	League			Cup		Continental		Playoffs		Total	
Club	Season	Division	Apps	Goals	Apps	Goals	Apps	Goals	Apps	Goals	Apps	Goals
Jeonbuk Hyundai Motors B	2022	K4 League	12	2	—		—		—		12	2
Jeonbuk Hyundai Motors B	2023	K4 League	5	0	—		—		—		5	0
Jeonbuk Hyundai Motors B	Total		17	2	0	0	0	0	0	0	17	2
Jeonbuk Hyundai Motors	2022	K League 1	15	0	0	0	—		—		15	0
Jeonbuk Hyundai Motors	2023	K League 1	1	0	0	0	—		—		1	0
Jeonbuk Hyundai Motors	2025	K League 1	34	0	6	0	3 (Note: Appearances in AFC Champions League Two)	0	—		43	0
Jeonbuk Hyundai Motors	2026	K League 1	27	1	1	0	3 (Note: Appearances in AFC Champions League Elite)	0	—		31	1
Jeonbuk Hyundai Motors	Total		77	1	7	0	6	0	0	0	90	1
Busan IPark (loan)	2023	K League 2	15	0	0	0	—		2 (Note: Appearance in K League promotion-relegation play-offs)	0	17	0
Suwon FC (loan)	2024	K League 1	29	3	0	0	—		—		29	3
Career total			138	6	7	0	6	0	2	0	153	6

=== International ===
Scores and results list South Korea's goal tally first.

List of international goals scored by Kang Sang-yoon
No.	Date	Venue	Opponent	Score	Result	Competition
1	11 July 2025	Yongin Mireu Stadium, Yongin, South Korea	Hong Kong	1–0	2–0	2025 EAFF Championship

== Honours ==
Jeonbuk Hyundai Motors

- K League 1: 2025
- Korean FA Cup: 2025

South Korea U23

- Asian Games: 2026

Individual

- K League 1 Best XI: 2025
- Korean FA Young Player of the Year: 2025
