= Lee Dong-gyeong =

South Korean footballer (born 1997)

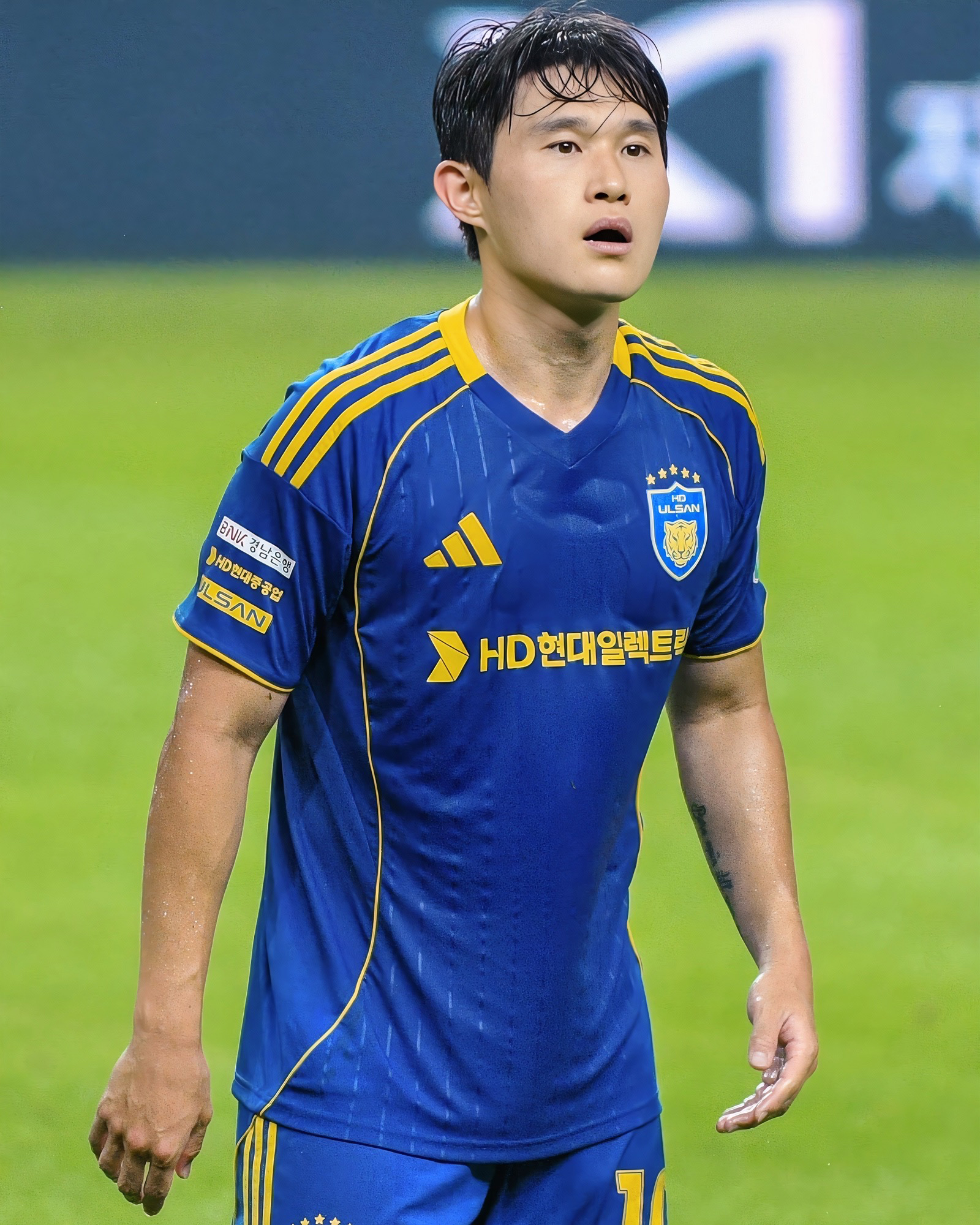
- Lee in 2026

Personal information
- Date of birth: 20 September 1997 (age 29)
- Place of birth: Daegu, South Korea
- Height: 1.76 m (5 ft 9 in)
- Position: Attacking midfielder

Team information
- Current team: Ulsan HD
- Number: 10

Youth career
- 2010–2015: Ulsan Hyundai (Note: Played for Hyundai Middle School from 2010 to 2012, and Hyundai High School from 2013 to 2015.)

College career
Years	Team	Apps	(Gls)
2016–2018	Hongik University		

Senior career*
Years	Team	Apps	(Gls)
2018–	Ulsan HD	126	(33)
2018	→ FC Anyang (loan)	10	(0)
2022	→ Schalke 04 (loan)	1	(0)
2022–2023	→ Hansa Rostock (loan)	12	(0)
2024–2025	→ Gimcheon Sangmu (draft)	52	(18)

International career^{‡}
2018–2021	South Korea U23	18	(12)
2019–	South Korea	22	(5)
Medal record
Representing South Korea
Men's football
AFC U-23 Championship
Winner	2020 Thailand
EAFF Championship
Runner-up	2025 South Korea
Korean name
Hangul	이동경
Hanja	李東炅
RR	I Donggyeong
MR	I Tonggyŏng
IPA	[i.doŋ.ɡjʌŋ]
- * Club domestic league appearances and goals as of 21 November 2026 ‡ National team caps and goals as of 17 November 2026

Lee Dong-gyeong (Korean: 이동경; born 20 September 1997) is a South Korean professional footballer who plays as an attacking midfielder for Ulsan HD and the South Korea national team.

== Club career ==
=== Ulsan HD ===
Prior to the 2018 season, Lee dropped out of Hongik University and joined K League 1 club Ulsan Hyundai (renamed Ulsan HD in 2024). On 29 July 2018, he made his professional debut in a 1–1 draw with Jeju United. After making his first appearance at Ulsan, he was loaned to K League 2 club FC Anyang for the second half of the season.

During the 2019 season, he found his spot at Ulsan, playing 25 K League 1 matches. On 18 May 2019, Lee scored his first professional goal in a 3–1 win over Suwon Samsung Bluewings.

Before the start of the 2020 season, he considered moving to Major League Soccer club Vancouver Whitecaps FC, but decided to stay at Ulsan to prepare for the 2020 Summer Olympics held in Japan. However, manager Kim Do-hoon did not use him as a main player, and so he tried to negotiate with Primeira Liga club Boavista in September. He already said goodbye to his teammates, but the transfer was not realised due to a conflict about his agent's commission. He was able to regain his spot after manager Kim left the club the next year.

==== Loan to Schalke 04 ====
On 31 January 2022, Lee joined 2. Bundesliga club Schalke 04 on loan until the end of the season, with an option to buy. On 13 February, he made his Schalke debut as a 60th-minute substitute in a 2–1 defeat to Fortuna Düsseldorf. After his first match, he injured his metatarsal bones, not being able to play any more matches for the club. Schalke extended the loan deal until the end of 2022 in the summer, but excluded him from their matches at the beginning of the next season despite his recovery.

==== Loan to Hansa Rostock ====
On 1 September, Lee was loaned to 2. Bundesliga club Hansa Rostock after terminating the contract with Schalke early. During the 2022–23 season, he usually played as a substitute for Rostock, making 12 appearances including two starts at the 2. Bundesliga. In the middle of the season, manager Patrick Glöckner pointed out Lee's physical weakness, and demanded to increase workrate and intensity of tussles from him.

==== Enlistment in Gimcheon Sangmu ====
In June 2024, Lee enlisted in Gimcheon Sangmu, the military football club of the K League 1, after military recruit training for four weeks. He had seven goals and five assists in eight league matches during March and April before enlistment, but lost momentum due to the four-week training. Despite this, he reached double-digit goals in a season for the first time.

In the 2025 season, Lee had 13 goals and 11 assists in 34 matches, while leading Gimcheon to finish third at the K League 1. He received the K League Most Valuable Player Award at the end of the season.

== International career ==
In June 2018, Lee was called up to the South Korea under-23 team for a training camp prior to the 2018 Asian Games. He made his international debut in a 2–1 win over Indonesia on 23 June, but was not selected for their squad for the Asian Games in August.

In March 2019, Lee scored six goals in three qualifiers of the 2020 AFC U-23 Championship, leading the team to advance to the final tournament. During the tournament, he scored the winner with a free-kick won by himself in the 2–1 quarter-final win over Jordan, scored another goal in the 2–0 semi-final win over Australia, and supplied a cross converted into the match's only goal in the 1–0 final win over Saudi Arabia.

Lee participated at the 2020 Summer Olympics. He was criticised for refusing a handshake with Chris Wood at the end of the 1–0 defeat to New Zealand, although the Korea Football Association explained that he was told to avoid unnecessary physical contacts to prevent COVID-19. In the quarter-finals against Mexico, he scored a brace, but his team lost 6–3.

Under Paulo Bento, Lee played six matches including four FIFA World Cup qualifiers for the senior national team, but was not called up for the 2022 FIFA World Cup. He also did not appear on the field at the 2026 FIFA World Cup despite being named in the South Korea squad for the tournament. In July 2026, he attempted to join EFL Championship club Stoke City, but his absence at the World Cup led to his lack of points required for a work permit.

== Career statistics ==
=== Club ===
As of 21 November 2026

Appearances and goals by club, season and competition
Club	Season	League			Cup		Continental		Total	
Club	Season	Division	Apps	Goals	Apps	Goals	Apps	Goals	Apps	Goals
Ulsan HD	2018	K League 1	1	0	0	0	0	0	1	0
Ulsan HD	2019	K League 1	25	3	0	0	3 (Note: Appearances in AFC Champions League Elite)	1	28	4
Ulsan HD	2020	K League 1	18	2	5	1	1	0	24	3
Ulsan HD	2021	K League 1	28	6	2	0	3	1	33	7
Ulsan HD	2023	K League 1	9	2	0	0	4	0	13	2
Ulsan HD	2024	K League 1	8	7	0	0	6	1	14	8
Ulsan HD	2025	K League 1	2	0	0	0	2	0	4	0
Ulsan HD	2026	K League 1	35	13	0	0	2	0	37	13
Ulsan HD	Total		126	33	7	1	21	3	154	37
FC Anyang (loan)	2018	K League 2	10	0	0	0	—		10	0
Schalke 04 (loan)	2021–22	2. Bundesliga	1	0	—		—		1	0
Hansa Rostock (loan)	2022–23	2. Bundesliga	12	0	0	0	—		12	0
Gimcheon Sangmu (draft)	2024	K League 1	18	5	1	0	—		19	5
Gimcheon Sangmu (draft)	2025	K League 1	34	13	0	0	—		34	13
Gimcheon Sangmu (draft)	Total		52	18	1	0	—		53	18
Total			201	51	8	1	21	3	230	55

=== International ===
As of match played on 17 November 2026

Appearances and goals by national team and year
National team	Year	Apps	Goals
South Korea	2019	2	0
South Korea	2021	4	1
South Korea	2022	1	0
South Korea	2023	1	0
South Korea	2024	1	0
South Korea	2025	7	2
South Korea	2026	6	2
Total		22	5

Scores and results list South Korea's goal tally first, score column indicates score after each Lee goal.

List of international goals scored by Lee Dong-gyeong
No.	Date	Venue	Opponent	Score	Result	Competition
1	9 June 2021	Goyang Stadium, Goyang, South Korea	Sri Lanka	2–0	5–0	2022 FIFA World Cup qualification
2	7 July 2025	Yongin Mireu Stadium, Yongin, South Korea	China	1–0	3–0	2025 EAFF Championship
3	6 September 2025	Sports Illustrated Stadium, Harrison, United States	United States	2–0	2–0	Friendly
4	3 June 2026	South Field, Provo, United States	El Salvador	1–0	1–0	Friendly
5	24 September 2026	Suwon World Cup Stadium, Suwon, South Korea	Ecuador	3–0	3–0	Friendly

== Honours ==
Ulsan Hyundai

- K League 1: 2023
- AFC Champions League: 2020

Schalke 04

- 2. Bundesliga: 2021–22

South Korea U23

- AFC U-23 Championship: 2020

South Korea

- EAFF Championship runner-up: 2025

Individual

- K League Goal of the Month: July 2020
- K League Player of the Month: October 2021, March 2024, April 2024
- K League All-Star: 2024, 2025, 2026
- K League 1 Best XI: 2024, 2025
- K League 1 Most Valuable Player: 2025
