= Yu Yao-hsing =

Taiwanese footballer

Yu Yao-hsing 游耀興
Personal information
- Date of birth: 12 February 2002 (age 24)
- Place of birth: Yilan County, Taiwan
- Height: 1.82 m (6 ft 0 in)
- Position: Forward

Team information
- Current team: Guangxi Hengchen

Youth career
- National Yilan Senior High School

Senior career*
Years	Team	Apps	(Gls)
2020–2024	Ming Chuan University	66	(17)
2024–2025	Foshan Nanshi	41	(3)
2026–	Guangxi Hengchen	10	(0)

International career^{‡}
2023–	Chinese Taipei	18	(7)
- * Club domestic league appearances and goals as of 13 November 2026 ‡ National team caps and goals as of 13 November 2026

Yu Yao-hsing (Chinese: 游耀興; born 12 February 2002) is a Taiwanese footballer who plays as a forward for China League One club Guangxi Hengchen and the Chinese Taipei national team.

== Club career ==
Yao-hsing had planned to stop playing football to attend the National Taiwan Normal University. However, when he was not accepted into the university, he decided to enroll at Ming Chuan University and continuing playing football with Ming Chuan University FC. During his first match with the club in 2020, he was the only freshman in the starting lineup. As of 2023, he serves as the team's captain.

On 5 March 2026, Yu joined China League One club Guangxi Hengchen.

== International career ==
Yao-hsing made his senior international debut on 16 June 2023 in a friendly against Thailand. Three days later he scored his first goal for Taiwan in a 3–2 friendly victory over the Philippines. On 12 October 2023, Yao-hsing scored a brace against Timor-Leste in Taiwan's opening match of 2026 FIFA World Cup qualification.

== Career statistics ==
=== International ===
As of match played 31 March 2026

Chinese Taipei
Year	Apps	Goals
2023	8	3
2024	6	3
2025	2	0
2026	1	1
Total	17	7

Scores and results list the Taiwan's goal tally first.

List of international goals scored by Yu Yao-hsing
No.	Date	Venue	Opponent	Score	Result	Competition
1	19 June 2023	Rizal Memorial Stadium, Manila, Philippines	Philippines	2–2	3–2	Friendly
2	12 October 2023	National Stadium, Kaohsiung, Taiwan	Timor-Leste	1–0	4–0	2026 FIFA World Cup qualification
3	12 October 2023	National Stadium, Kaohsiung, Taiwan	Timor-Leste	3–0	4–0	2026 FIFA World Cup qualification
4	11 June 2024	Bukit Jalil National Stadium, Kuala Lumpur, Malaysia	Malaysia	1–0	1–3	2026 FIFA World Cup qualification
5	11 December 2024	Mong Kok Stadium, Mong Kok, Hong Kong	Mongolia	3–0	4–0	2025 EAFF E-1 Football Championship
6	14 December 2024	Mong Kok Stadium, Mong Kok, Hong Kong	Hong Kong	1–1	1–2	2025 EAFF E-1 Football Championship
7	31 March 2026	Taipei Municipal Stadium, Taipei, Taiwan	Sri Lanka	1–3	1–3	2027 AFC Asian Cup qualification
