= Huang Zhengyu =

Chinese footballer (born 1997)

Huang Zhengyu 黄政宇
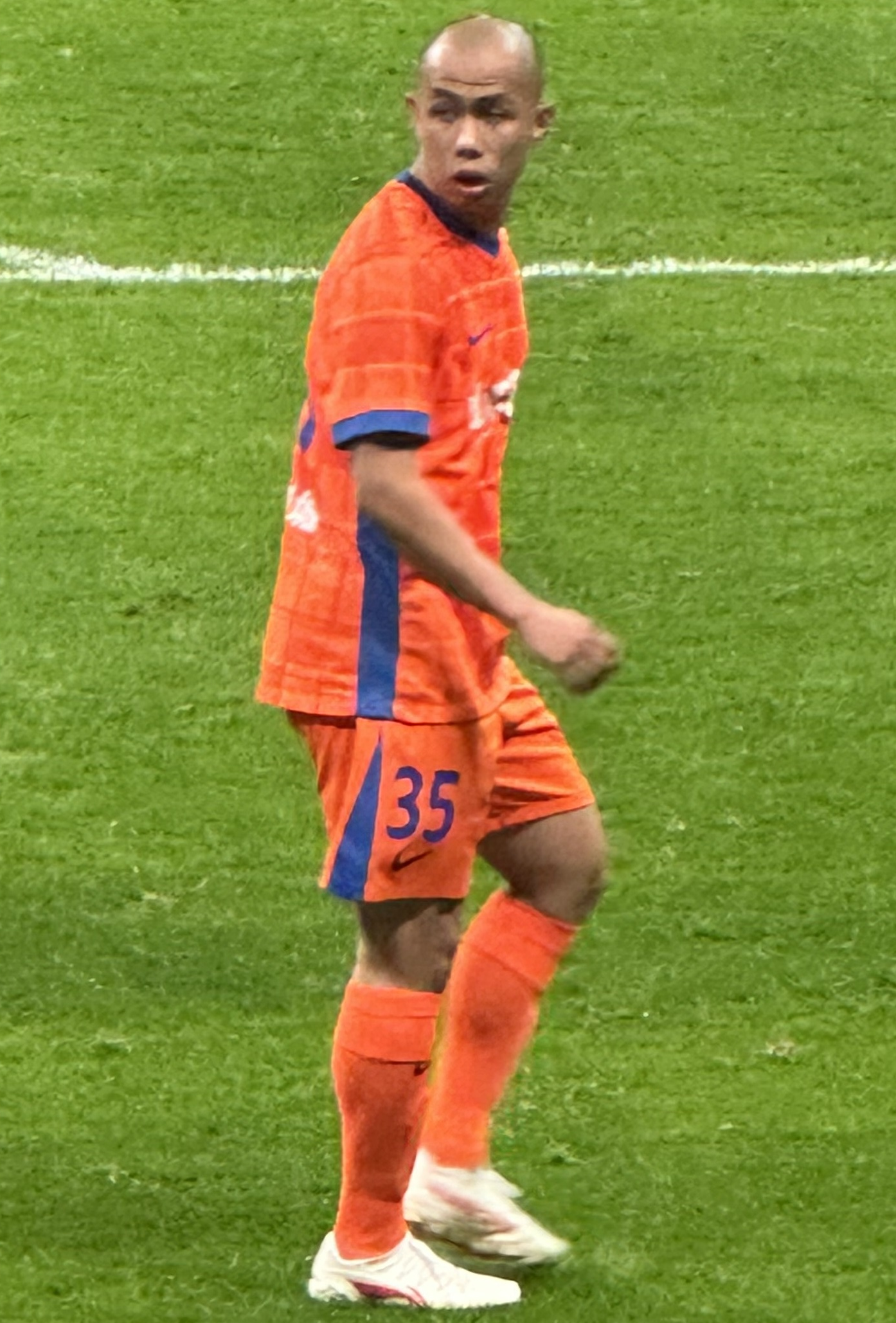
- Huang Zhengyu in April 2025

Personal information
- Date of birth: 24 January 1997 (age 29)
- Place of birth: Guangzhou, Guangdong, China
- Height: 1.78 m (5 ft 10 in)
- Positions: Defensive midfielder; centre-back

Team information
- Current team: Shandong Taishan
- Number: 35

Youth career
- Pui Ching Middle School
- Guangzhou No.5 Middle School
- 2015–2016: Guangzhou R&F

Senior career*
Years	Team	Apps	(Gls)
2016–2022	Guangzhou City	118	(1)
2023–	Shandong Taishan	98	(2)

International career^{‡}
2016	China U-19	4	(0)
2017–2020	China U-23	16	(0)
2024–	China	7	(1)
Medal record
Representing China
Men's football
EAFF Championship
Bronze medal – third place	2025 South Korea	Team
- * Club domestic league appearances and goals as of 19 November 2026 ‡ National team caps and goals as of 15 July 2025

Huang Zhengyu
- Simplified Chinese: 黄政宇
- Traditional Chinese: 黃政宇
Transcriptions
Standard Mandarin
- Hanyu Pinyin: Huáng Zhèngyǔ
- IPA: [xwǎŋ ʈʂə̂ŋ ỳ]
Yue: Cantonese
- Jyutping: Wong4 Zing3jyu5
- IPA: [wɔŋ˩ tsɪŋ˧ jy˩˧]

Huang Zhengyu (Chinese: 黄政宇; pinyin: Huáng Zhèngyǔ; Jyutping: Wong4 Zing3jyu5; born 24 January 1997) is a Chinese professional footballer who plays as a defensive midfielder or centre-back for Chinese Super League club Shandong Taishan and the China national team.

== Club career ==
=== Guangzhou R&F ===
In 2016, Huang Zhengyu was promoted to Chinese Super League side Guangzhou R&F first team by manager Dragan Stojković. He made his senior debut on 2 July 2016 in a 4–2 home victory against Shijiazhuang Ever Bright, coming on as a substitute for Lu Lin in the 87th minute. Huang played six league match for Guangzhou in the 2016 season and extended his contract with the club on 7 November 2016 for five years.

Huang became a regular starter for Guangzhou R&F in the 2017 season, benefitting from the new CSL regulation that at least one under-23 player must be in the starting line-up. He started 29 CSL games at centre back and played 2,637 minutes in total, which was the most of all U23 players in the 2017 CSL season. He was also named the best U23 player and was selected in the CSL team of the year. Huang extended his contract again until the end of 2022 season on 5 December 2017.

On 4 September 2020, Huang scored his first career goal in a 2-1 defeat against Guangzhou Evergrande. On 10 November 2020, Huang made his 100th appearance for Guangzhou R&F in a 4-0 win against Dalian Professional.

=== Shandong Taishan ===
On 11 April 2023, Huang joined fellow Chinese Super League club Shandong Taishan. On 24 May 2023, Huang made his debut for the club in a 3-0 home win against Shenzhen F.C. On 3 June 2023, he scored his first goal for Taishan in a 2-0 home win against Dalian Professional.

== International career ==
On 18 September 2016, Huang was selected in the China U19 for the 2016 AFC U-19 Championship. He was selected in the China U22 for the Dubai Cup on 13 March 2017.

Huang made his debut for the China national team on 11 June 2024 in a World Cup qualifier against South Korea at the Seoul World Cup Stadium. He substituted Wang Shangyuan in the 78th minute as South Korea won 1–0. On 15 July 2025, Huang scored his first international goal in a 1-0 win against Hong Kong in the final game of 2025 EAFF E-1 Football Championship.

== Career statistics ==
Statistics accurate as of match played 22 November 2025.

Appearances and goals by club, season and competition
Club	Season	League			National Cup		Continental		Other		Total	
Club	Season	Division	Apps	Goals	Apps	Goals	Apps	Goals	Apps	Goals	Apps	Goals
Guangzhou R&F	2016	Chinese Super League	6	0	1	0	-		-		7	0
Guangzhou R&F	2017	Chinese Super League	29	0	4	0	-		-		33	0
Guangzhou R&F	2018	Chinese Super League	20	0	4	0	-		-		24	0
Guangzhou R&F	2019	Chinese Super League	16	0	1	0	-		-		17	0
Guangzhou R&F	2020	Chinese Super League	18	1	3	0	-		-		21	1
Guangzhou R&F	2021	Chinese Super League	19	0	1	0	-		-		20	0
Guangzhou R&F	2022	Chinese Super League	10	0	0	0	-		-		10	0
Guangzhou R&F	Total		118	1	14	0	0	0	0	0	132	1
Shandong Taishan	2023	Chinese Super League	16	1	3	0	3	0	-		22	0
Shandong Taishan	2024	Chinese Super League	29	0	3	0	6	0	-		38	0
Shandong Taishan	2025	Chinese Super League	25	1	2	0	-		-		27	1
Shandong Taishan	Total		70	2	8	0	9	0	0	0	87	2
Career total			188	3	22	0	9	0	0	0	219	3

=== International goals ===
No.	Date	Venue	Opponent	Score	Result	Competition
1	15 July 2025	Yongin Mireu Stadium, Yongin, South Korea	Hong Kong	1–0	1–0	2025 EAFF E-1 Football Championship

== Honours ==
=== Individual ===
- Chinese Super League U-23 Player of the Year: 2017
- Chinese Super League Team of the Year: 2017
