= Mao Hosoya =

Japanese footballer (born 2001)

Mao Hosoya 細谷 真大
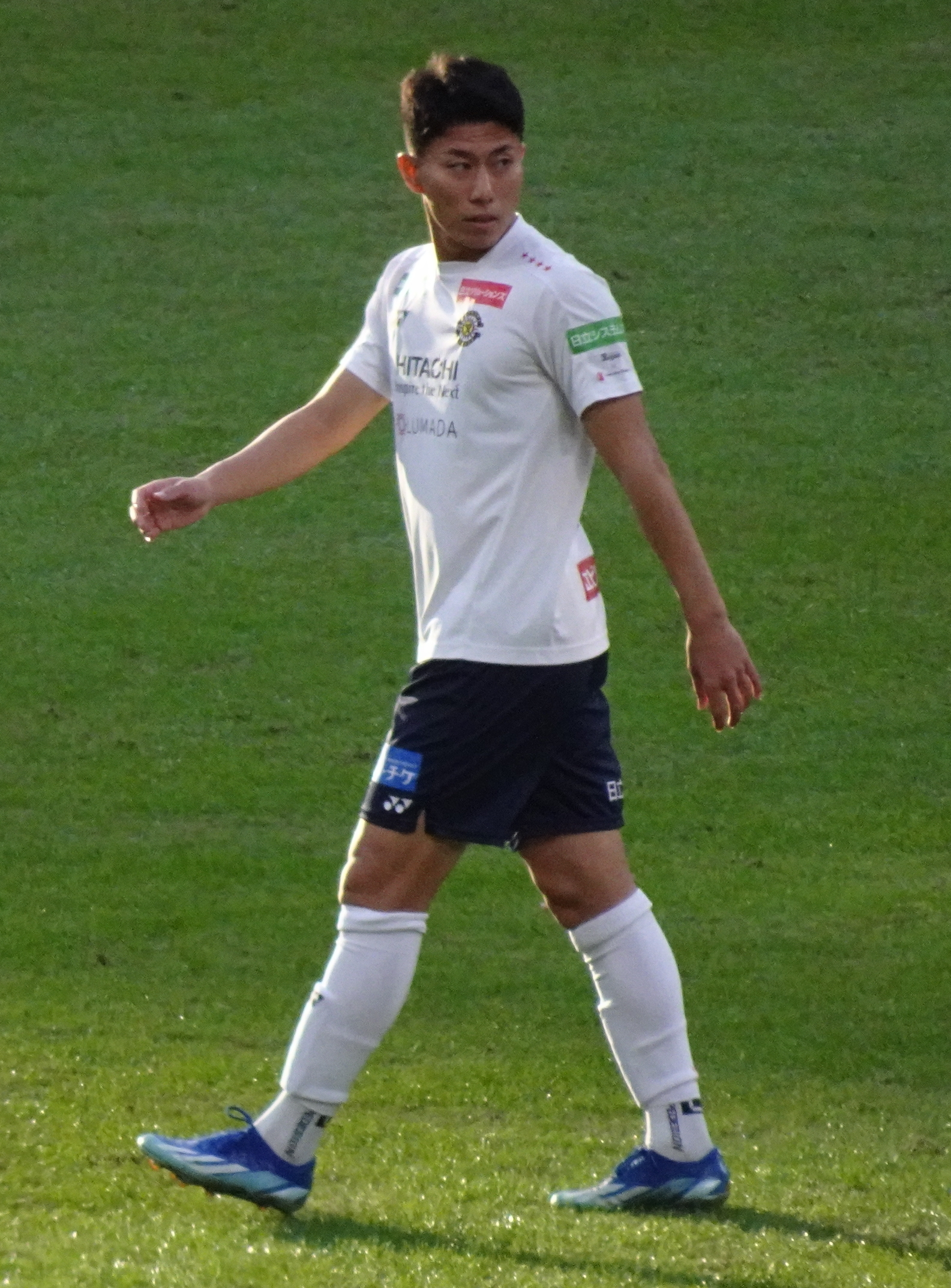
- Mao Hosoya playing for Kashiwa Reysol in 2023.

Personal information
- Date of birth: 7 September 2001 (age 25)
- Place of birth: Ushiku, Ibaraki, Japan
- Height: 1.78 m (5 ft 10 in)
- Position: Forward

Team information
- Current team: Kashiwa Reysol
- Number: 9

Youth career
- –2019: Kashiwa Reysol

Senior career*
Years	Team	Apps	(Gls)
2019–	Kashiwa Reysol	192	(45)

International career^{‡}
2021–2024	Japan U23	22	(10)
2022–	Japan	9	(3)
Medal record
Men's football
Representing Japan
EAFF Championship
Winner	2022 Japan	Team
Winner	2025 Japan	Team
AFC U-23 Asian Cup
Bronze medal – third place	2022 Uzbekistan	Team
Gold medal – first place	2024 Qatar	Team
- * Club domestic league appearances and goals as of 10 August 2026 ‡ National team caps and goals as of 15 July 2025

Mao Hosoya (細谷 真大, Hosoya Mao; born 7 September 2001) is a Japanese professional footballer who plays as a forward for J1 League club Kashiwa Reysol and the Japan national team.

== Youth career ==
Born in Ushiku City, Hosoya started playing football in the first grade of elementary school, inspired by his father. He came up through the ranks of the Kashiwa Reysol's academy. He started at Kashiwa Reysol AATOR '82 then moving on through the U-15s whilst at elementary school and junior high school. Due to its close ties with Kashiwa Reysol, Hosoya attended Nippon Sport Science University Kashiwa High School whilst playing for the U-18s.

Hosoya made his debut for the U-18s aged 16 in April 2018, when appearing in the Prince Takamado Trophy JFA U-18 Football League in a game against Júbilo Iwata U-18s. The following month, he scored his first goal for the U-18s in a 1–1 draw with Aomori Yamada High School. He went on to make 19 appearances through the 2018 season.

In 2019, aged 17, Hosoya was registered as a top team player for Reysol on a Type 2 contract. He continued to play for the U-18s as well as represent the first team. In 2019 for the U-18s, he made 16 appearances and scored 10 goals in all competitions, including a hat-trick against Júbilo Iwata U-18s.

== Club career ==
=== Kashiwa Reysol ===
Whilst registered as a Type 2 player, in March 2019 Hosoya made his J.League debut in a 2–0 league defeat to Tokyo Verdy, coming on as a 64th-minute substitute for Yusuke Segawa. He scored his first senior goal in a 4–0 Emperor's Cup victory over Iwate Grulla Morioka.

In September 2019, it was announced that Hosoya would be promoted fully to the top team for the 2020 season.

Hosoya only made two league appearances in his rookie season in 2020, largely due to the form of eventual MVP and top goalscorer Michael Olunga and Hosoya generally finding the transition to senior football difficult.

With both Olunga and Hiroto Goya leaving the club at the end of the 2020 season, Hosoya was afforded much more opportunity during the 2021 campaign. He scored his first league goal for the club in a 2–1 defeat to Yokohama F. Marinos after coming on as a late substitute. He went on to make 35 appearances across all competitions and scored 3 goals.

The 2022 season was a breakout season for Hosoya, as he had become the first-choice forward for Reysol. He started the season in fantastic form, scoring 6 goals in the first 16 league games. By the end of the season, he had made 34 appearances and scored 8 goals and coupled with his impressive performances was enough to earn him the 2022 J.League Best Young Player award.

== International career ==
=== Youth career ===
Hosoya was first selected for the Japan national under-19 team in July 2019 as part of a training camp.

He then made his first appearance for the Japan national under-23 football team in October 2021 as part of the qualification campaign for the 2022 AFC U-23 Asian Cup. He played and scored in both of Japan's games, firstly in a 4–0 win over Cambodia and secondly in 4–0 win over Hong Kong. Japan qualified for the main competition after finishing top of their group.

Hosoya then took part in the Dubai Cup U-23 competition in March 2022. He made his first appearance for them in the second game of the competition, starting in a 2–0 victory over Qatar U-23s. He also started in the final of the cup against Saudi Arabia U-23s and scored in the 20th minute. Japan went on to win the game 1–0 and were crowned competition winners.

Following a three-day training camp in Chiba in May 2022, later that month it was announced that Hosoya would be part of the squad for the 2022 AFC U-23 Asian Cup. Japan decided only to take U-21 players, even though it was an U-23 competition, in order to better prepare them for the 2024 Paris Olympics. During the tournament, in which Japan finished third, Hosoya started in four of Japan's six games and scored two goals. He scored the winning goal in their opening group game win against United Arab Emirates and scored Japan's second in a 3–0 victory over South Korea in the quarter-finals.

He also scored in a friendly against Switzerland in September 2022 for the U-21s.

=== Senior career ===
On 13 July 2022, it was announced that Hosoya had been called up to the senior national team to take part in the 2022 EAFF E-1 Football Championship, alongside teammate Takuma Ominami. He made his debut in a 0–0 draw with China. Japan went on to win the competition.

In July 2024, Hosoya was named in Japan's squad for the 2024 Summer Olympics. He scored an injury time winning goal in a 1–0 over Israel in the group stage of the competition.

On 4 April 2024, Hosoya was called up to the Japan U23 squad for the 2024 AFC U-23 Asian Cup.

== Career statistics ==
=== Club ===
As of 10 May 2025

Appearances and goals by club, season and competition
Club	Season	League			Emperor's Cup		J.League Cup		Other		Total	
Club	Season	Division	Apps	Goals	Apps	Goals	Apps	Goals	Apps	Goals	Apps	Goals
Kashiwa Reysol	2019	J2 League	6	0	1	1	1	0	–		8	1
Kashiwa Reysol	2020	J1 League	2	0	0	0	2	1	–		4	1
Kashiwa Reysol	2021	J1 League	28	3	2	0	5	0	–		35	3
Kashiwa Reysol	2022	J1 League	33	8	1	0	0	0	–		34	8
Kashiwa Reysol	2023	J1 League	32	13	4	1	5	2	–		41	16
Kashiwa Reysol	2024	J1 League	32	6	2	1	0	0	–		34	7
Kashiwa Reysol	2025	J1 League	13	2	0	0	2	0	–		15	2
Career total			146	32	10	3	15	3	0	0	171	38

=== International ===
As of match played 15 July 2025

Appearances and goals by national team and year
National team	Year	Apps	Goals
Japan	2022	1	0
Japan	2023	2	1
Japan	2024	3	0
Japan	2025	3	2
Total		9	3

Scores and results list Japan's goal tally first, score column indicates score after each Hosoya goal.

List of international goals scored by Mao Hosoya
No.	Date	Venue	Opponent	Score	Result	Competition
1	21 November 2023	Prince Abdullah Al Faisal Stadium, Jeddah, Saudi Arabia	Syria	5–0	5–0	2026 FIFA World Cup qualification
2	10 June 2025	Suita City Football Stadium, Suita, Japan	Indonesia	6–0	6–0	2026 FIFA World Cup qualification
3	12 July 2025	Yongin Mireu Stadium, Yongin, South Korea	China	1–0	2–0	2025 EAFF E-1 Football Championship

== Honors ==
Japan

- EAFF E-1 Football Championship: 2022, 2025

Japan U23

- AFC U-23 Asian Cup: 2024

Individual

- J.League Best Young Player: 2022
