= 2025 EAFF E-1 Football Championship =

2025년 EAFF E-1 풋볼 챔피언십

Tournament details
- Host country: South Korea
- City: Yongin
- Dates: 7–15 July
- Teams: 4 (from 1 sub-confederation)

Final positions
- Champions: Japan (3rd title)
- Runners-up: South Korea
- Third place: China
- Fourth place: Hong Kong

Tournament statistics
- Matches played: 6
- Goals scored: 16 (2.67 per match)
- Attendance: 32,136 (5,356 per match)
- Top scorer(s): (Japan) Ryo Germain (5 goals)
- Best player: (Japan) Ryo Germain
- Best goalkeeper: (Japan) Keisuke Ōsako

The 2025 EAFF E-1 Football Championship was an association football tournament organised by the East Asian Football Federation. It was the tenth edition of the men's tournament of the EAFF E-1 Football Championship, the men's football championship of East Asia. The preliminary competition was held on 8–17 December 2024 in Hong Kong, and the tournament was held on 7–15 July 2025 in South Korea.

== Teams ==
Ten teams were allocated to their particular stage. The winner of the preliminary round progressed to the next stage.

Final Round	Preliminary Round
South Korea (hosts); Japan; China	Hong Kong (hosts); ~~North Korea~~ (withdrawn); Chinese Taipei; Macau; Mongolia; Guam

== Venues ==
Preliminary Round			Final Round
Hong Kong			(South Korea) Yongin
Hong Kong Stadium	Kai Tak Youth Sports Ground	Mong Kok Stadium	Yongin Mireu Stadium
Capacity: 40,000	Capacity: 5,000	Capacity: 6,664	Capacity: 37,155

== Preliminary competition ==
=== Draw ===
The tournament's official draw was released on 15 November 2024. The pot placements followed each team's progress based on the world rankings.

Pot 1	Pot 2	Pot 3
Hong Kong (159) (H); ~~North Korea (110)~~ (Withdrawn)	Chinese Taipei (165); Macau (185)	Mongolia (189); Guam (204)

==== Matches ====
Six countries drawn lots in 2 groups, two teams on the top in each group contested in the final.

===== Group A =====
Pos	Team	Pld	W	D	L	GF	GA	GD	Pts	Qualification
1	Guam	1	1	0	0	2	1	+1	3	Advance to Final
2	Macau	1	0	0	1	1	2	−1	0	
3	North Korea	0	0	0	0	0	0	0	0	Withdrawal after the draw

Source: EAFF

All times are local time, Hong Kong Time (UTC+08:00).

8 December 2024
14:00

Guam	Cancelled	North Korea

Mong Kok Stadium, Hong Kong
14 December 2024
14:00

Macau	1–2	Guam
Lei Cheng Lam 41' (pen.)	Report	Morimoto 31'; Taitague 73'

Kai Tak Youth Sports Ground, Hong Kong
Attendance: 534
Referee: Tam Ping Wun (Hong Kong)
14 December 2024
14:00

North Korea	Cancelled	Macau

Mong Kok Stadium, Hong Kong

===== Group B =====
Pos	Team	Pld	W	D	L	GF	GA	GD	Pts	Qualification
1	Hong Kong (H)	2	2	0	0	5	1	+4	6	Advance to Final
2	Chinese Taipei	2	1	0	1	5	2	+3	3	
3	Mongolia	2	0	0	2	0	7	−7	0	

Source: EAFF
(H) Hosts

All times are local time, Hong Kong Time (UTC+08:00).

8 December 2024
18:00

Mongolia	0–3	Hong Kong
	Report	Everton 24'; Wong Wai 35'; Benavides 60'

Mong Kok Stadium, Hong Kong
Attendance: 3,329
Referee: Wiwat Jumpao-on (Thailand)
11 December 2024
20:00

Chinese Taipei	4–0	Mongolia
Kouamé 42', 83'; Benchy 59'; Yu Yao-hsing 76'	Report

Mong Kok Stadium, Hong Kong
Attendance: 892
Referee: Du Jianxin (China)
14 December 2024
20:00

Hong Kong	2–1	Chinese Taipei
Orr 19'; Tsui Wang Kit 87'	Report	Yu Yao-hsing 29'

Mong Kok Stadium, Hong Kong
Attendance: 5,637
Referee: Chae Sang-hyeop (South Korea)

=== Final ===
17 December 2024
20:00

Guam	0–5	Hong Kong
	Report	Chan Siu Kwan 2', 53'; Benavides 12'; Everton 50'; Dudu 78'

Hong Kong Stadium, Hong Kong
Attendance: 8,236
Referee: Wiwat Jumpao-on (Thailand)

== Final round ==
The final round was held in South Korea from 7 to 15 July 2025. On 29 April 2025, Yongin government announced that the city would host all 6 matches of the final round at Yongin Mireu Stadium.

=== Table ===
Pos	Team	Pld	W	D	L	GF	GA	GD	Pts	Result
1	Japan (C)	3	3	0	0	9	1	+8	9	Champions
2	South Korea (H)	3	2	0	1	5	1	+4	6	Runners-up
3	China	3	1	0	2	1	5	−4	3	Third place
4	Hong Kong	3	0	0	3	1	9	−8	0	Fourth place

Source: EAFF
(C) Champions; (H) Hosts

=== Matches ===
All times are local time, Korea Standard Time (UTC+09:00).

7 July 2025
20:00

South Korea	3–0	China
Lee Dong-gyeong 8'; Joo Min-kyu 21'; Kim Ju-sung 56'	Report

Yongin Mireu Stadium, Yongin
Attendance: 4,426
Referee: Tuan Yaasin (Malaysia)
8 July 2025
19:24

Japan	6–1	Hong Kong
Germain 4', 10', 22', 26'; Inagaki 20'; Nakamura 90+4'	Report	Orr 59'

Yongin Mireu Stadium, Yongin
Attendance: 687
Referee: Thoriq Alkatiri (Indonesia)

11 July 2025
20:00

Hong Kong	0–2	South Korea
	Report	Kang Sang-yoon 27'; Lee Ho-jae 67'

Yongin Mireu Stadium, Yongin
Attendance: 5,521
Referee: Ahmad A'Qashah (Singapore)
12 July 2025
19:24

Japan	2–0	China
Hosoya 11'; Mochizuki 63'	Report

Yongin Mireu Stadium, Yongin
Attendance: 1,661
Referee: Sivakorn Pu-udom (Thailand)

15 July 2025
16:00

China	1–0	Hong Kong
Huang Zhengyu 20'	Report

Yongin Mireu Stadium, Yongin
Attendance: 1,423
Referee: Ngô Duy Lân (Vietnam)
15 July 2025
19:24

South Korea	0–1	Japan
	Report	Germain 8'

Yongin Mireu Stadium, Yongin
Attendance: 18,418
Referee: Tuan Yaasin (Malaysia)

=== Awards ===
Best goalkeeper	Best defender	Top scorer	Most Valuable Player
(Japan) Keisuke Ōsako	(South Korea) Kim Moon-hwan	(Japan) Ryo Germain	(Japan) Ryo Germain

=== Goalscorers ===
5 goals

- (Japan) Ryo Germain

1 goal

- (China) Huang Zhengyu
- (Hong Kong) Matt Orr
- (Japan) Mao Hosoya
- (Japan) Sho Inagaki
- (Japan) Henry Heroki Mochizuki
- (Japan) Sōta Nakamura
- (South Korea) Joo Min-kyu
- (South Korea) Kang Sang-yoon

- (South Korea) Kim Ju-sung
- (South Korea) Lee Dong-gyeong
- (South Korea) Lee Ho-jae

== See also ==
- 2026 WAFF Championship
- 2025 CAFA Nations Cup
- 2025 EAFF E-1 Football Championship (women)
