= Yongin Mireu Stadium =

Stadium in Yongin, South Korea

- Interactive map of Yongin Mireu Stadium
- Former names: Yongin Citizen Sports Park (2018–2020)
- Location: Cheoin-gu, Yongin, South Korea
- Coordinates: 37.2498°N 127.1653°E
- Owner: City of Yongin
- Operator: Yongin Urban Corporation
- Capacity: 37,155
- Surface: Natural grass
- Record attendance: 35,198 (South Korea–Iraq, 15 October 2024)
- Field size: 105 by 68 metres (115 by 74 yards)

Construction
- Groundbreaking: February 2010
- Built: 2011–2017
- Opened: 1 January 2018

Tenant
- Yongin FC (2026–present)

Yongin Mireu Stadium (Korean: 용인미르스타디움), formerly named Yongin Citizen Sports Park, is a multi-purpose stadium located in Yongin, South Korea. It is the home ground of K League 2 club Yongin FC.

== History ==
Yongin Mireu Stadium was built to replace the aging Yongin Stadium. Initially, it was intended to be built as a multi-purpose sports park including an auxiliary stadium, a 32-lane bowling alley, and an underground parking lot. However, only the main stadium was completed first due to budget constraints. The stadium was completed by late 2017 at the cost of $219 million. In 2019, it hosted six games of the 2019 AFC Women's Club Championship.

In July 2020, following a citizen survey, the name was changed from Yongin Citizen Sports Park to Yongin Mireu Stadium, reflecting the stadium's design, which is shaped like a soaring dragon (mireu is the Korean translation for a dragon).

== Gallery ==
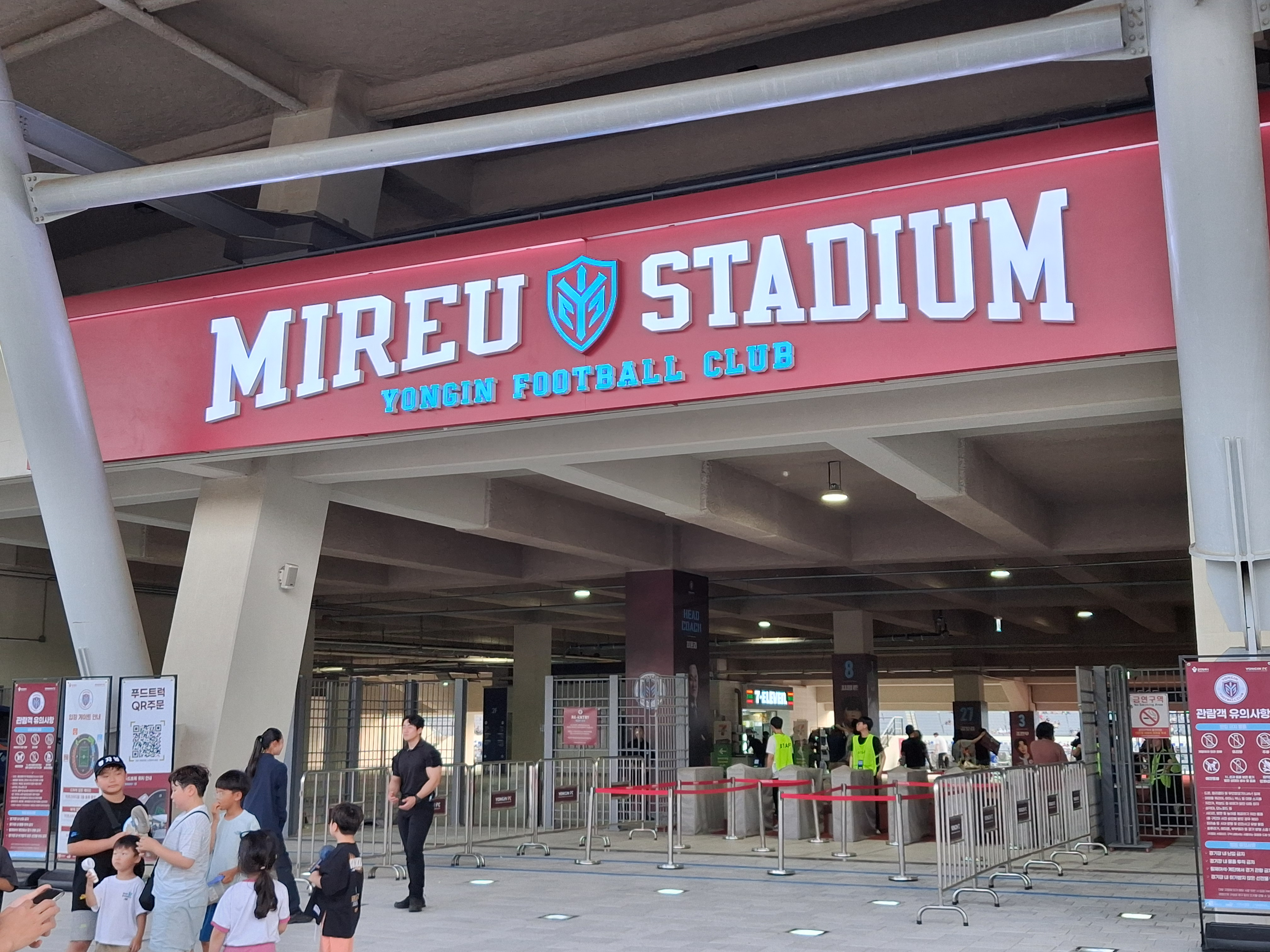
Stadium entrance

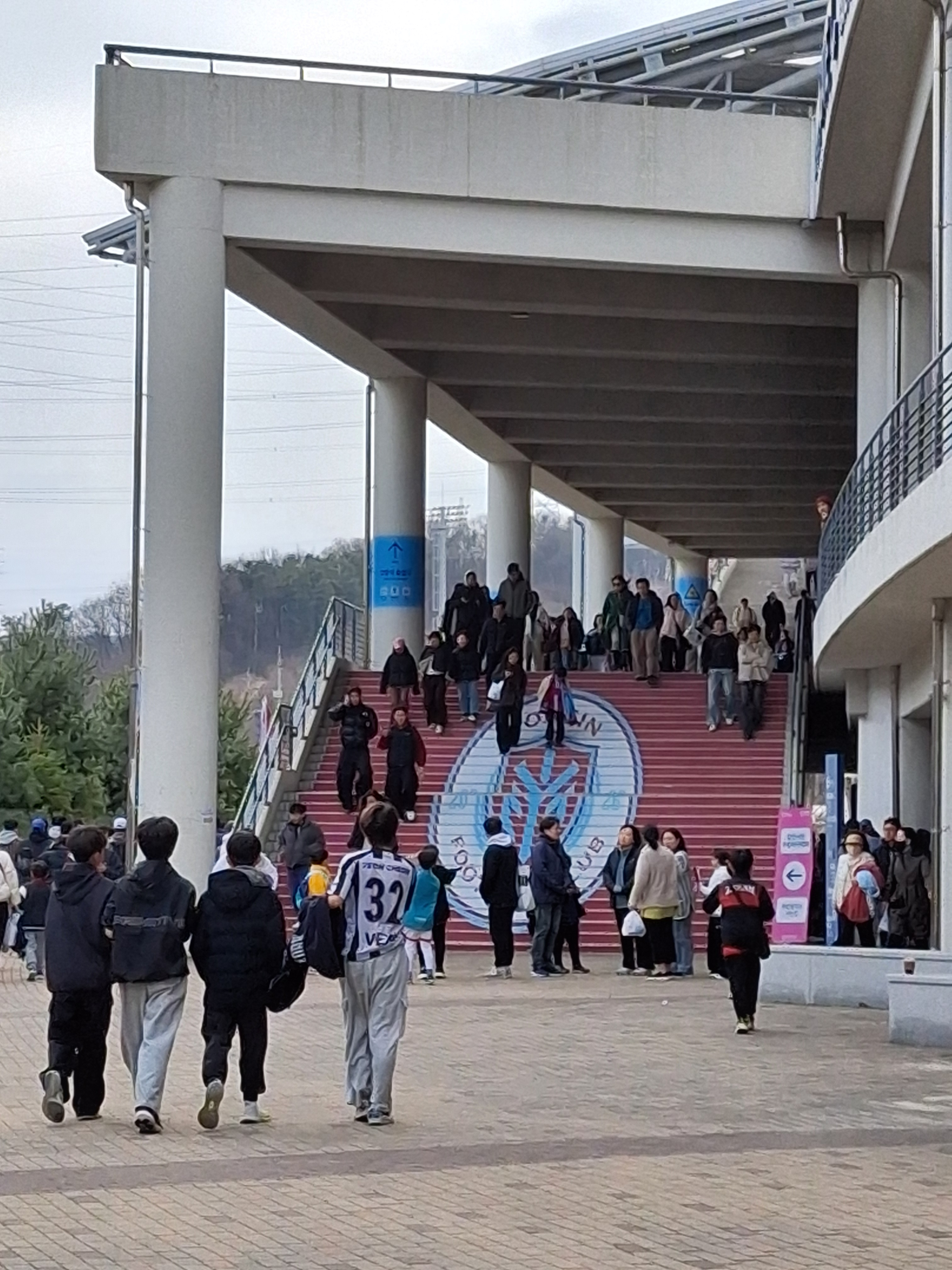
Stairs to the upper seats entrance

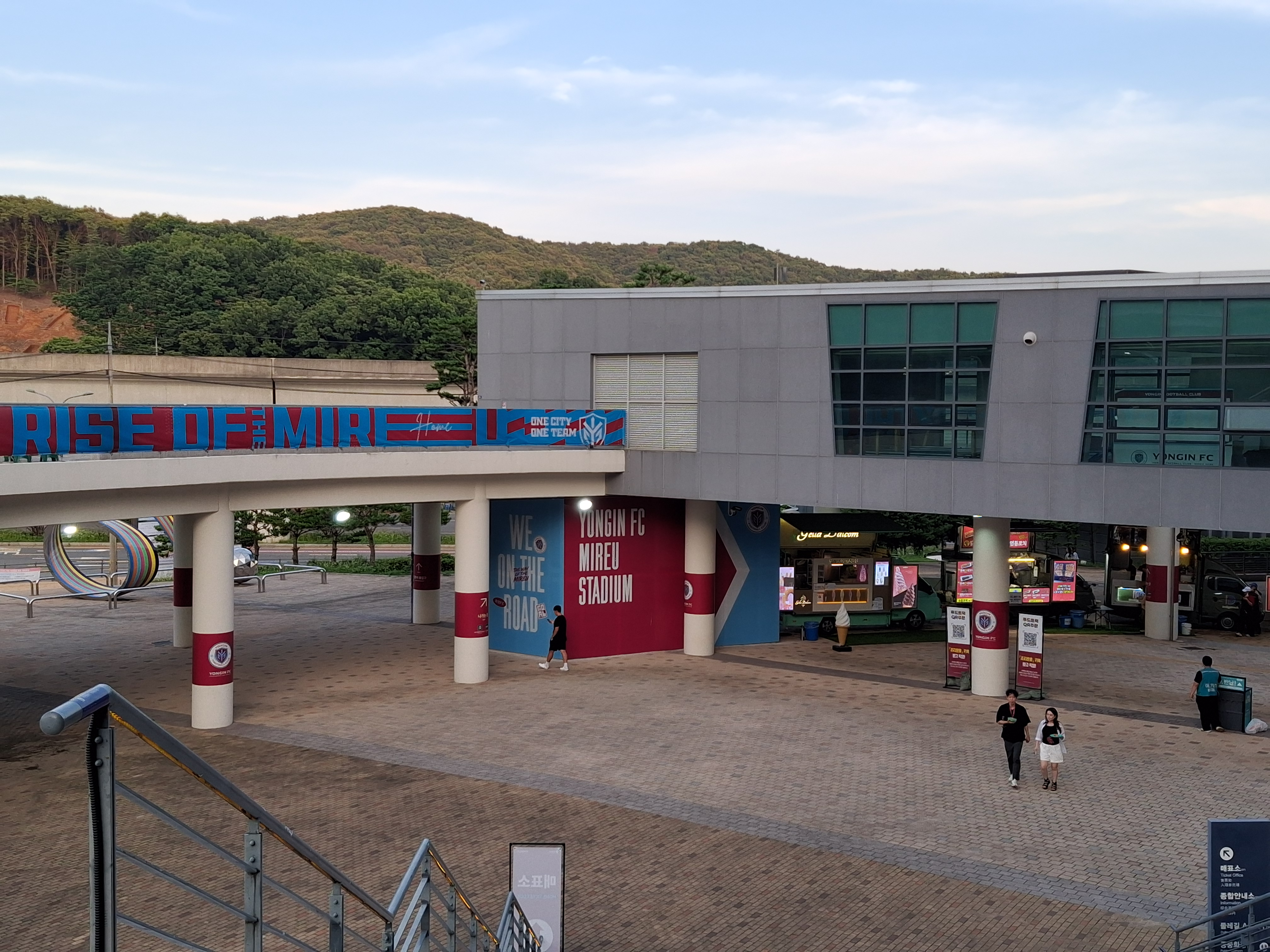
View of stadium limits and food trucks

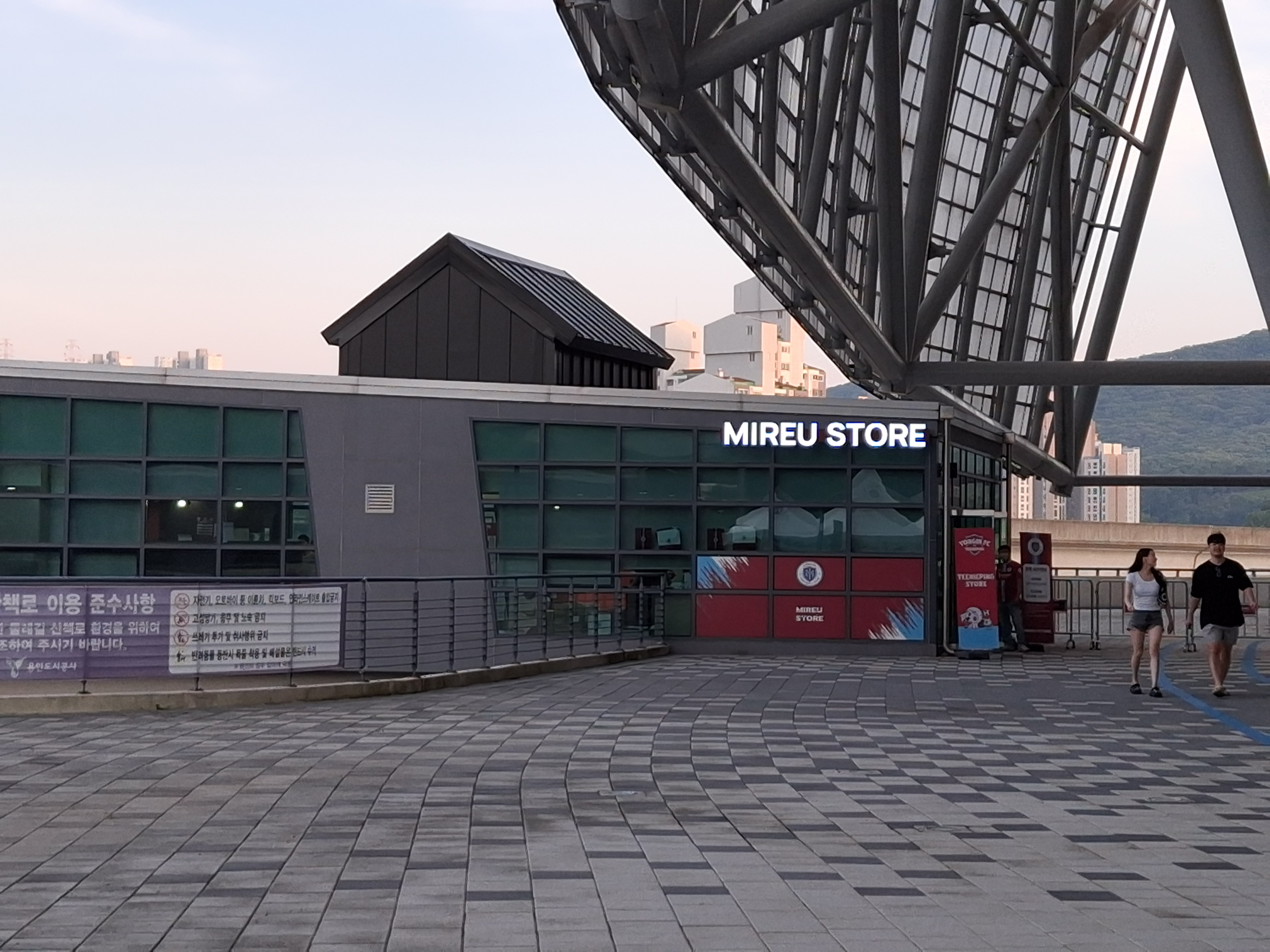
The Mireu Store in the stadium for Yongin FC merchandise

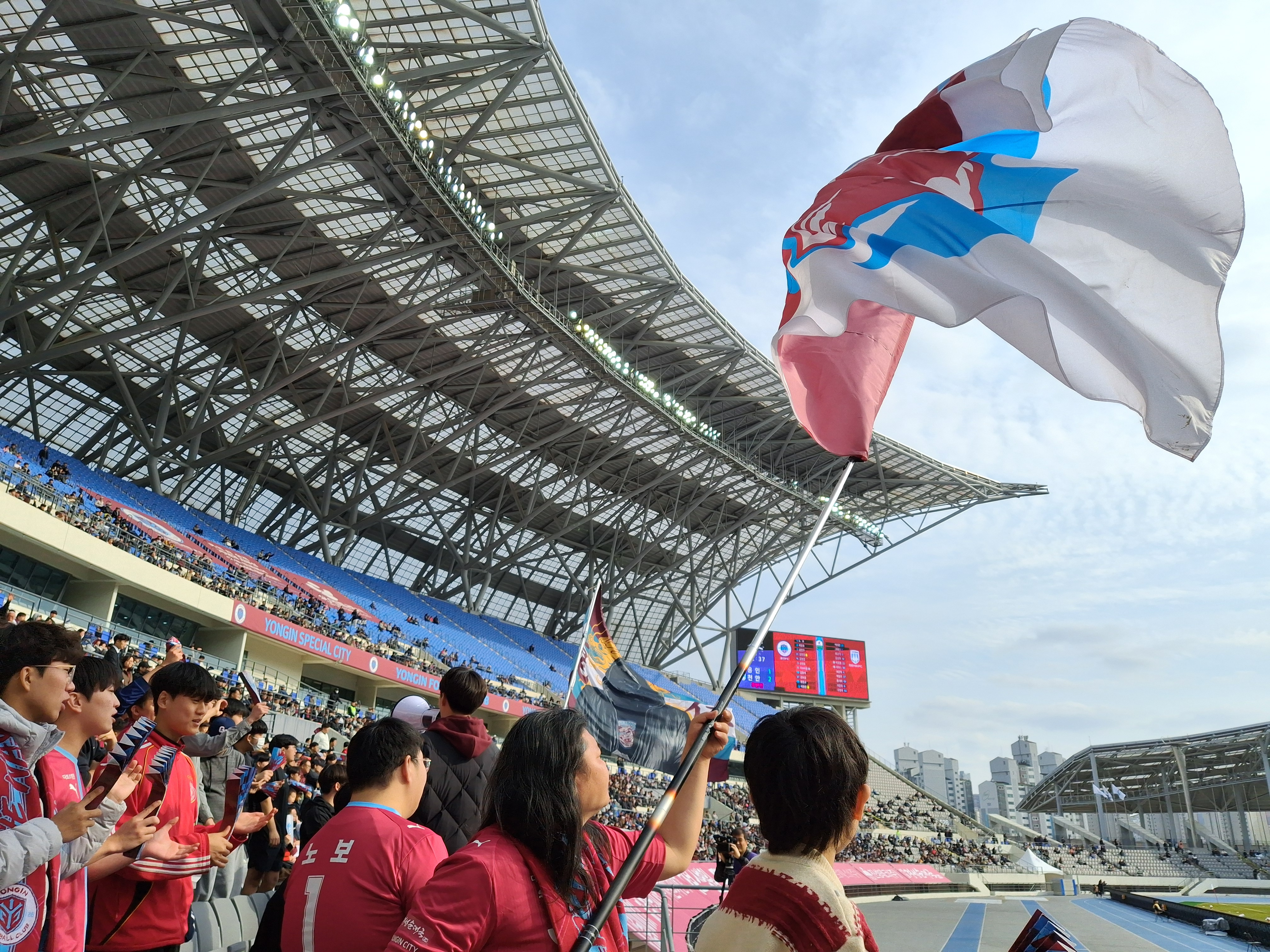
Yongin FC supporters

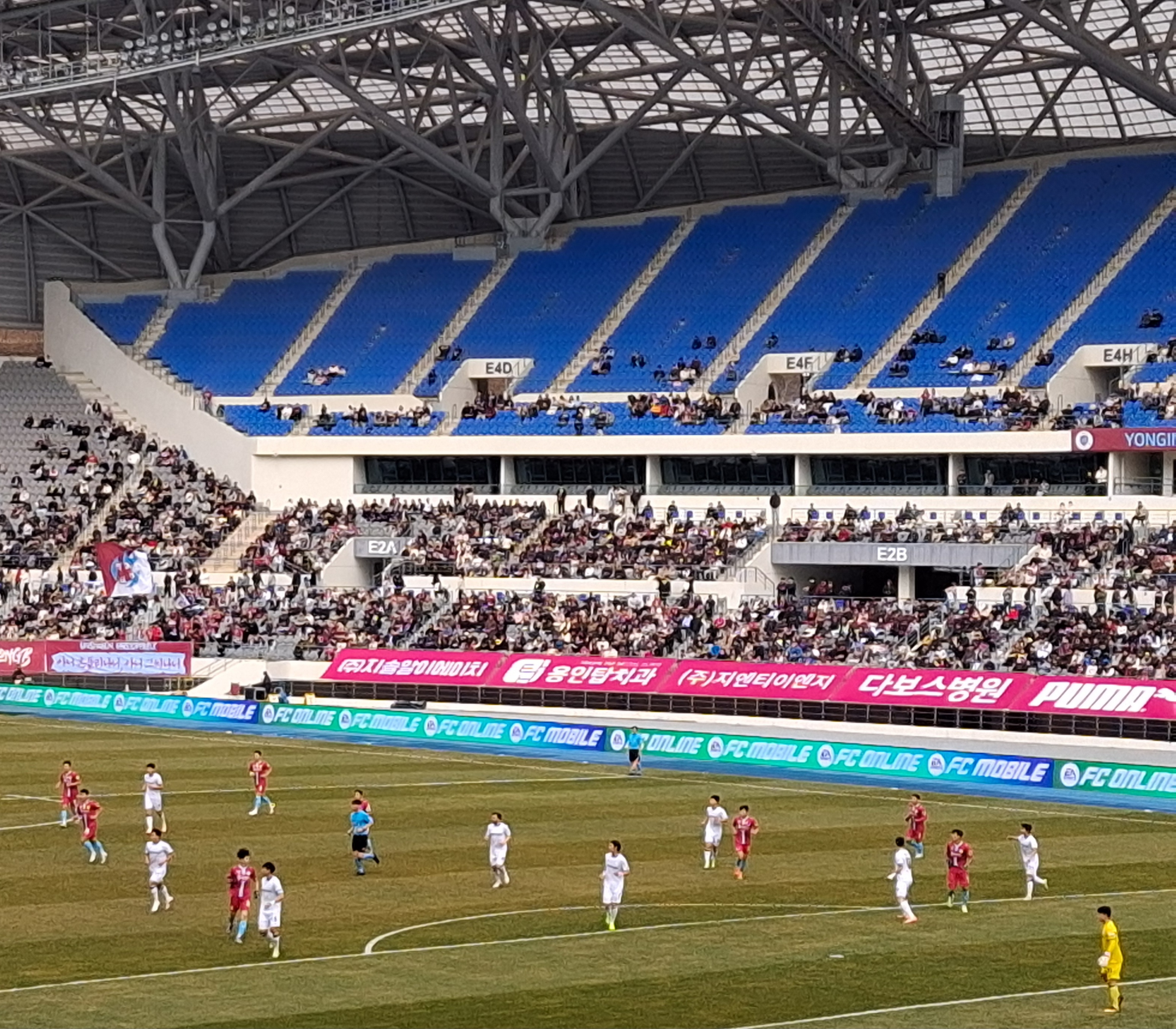
Yongin FC's first professional game
