= 2020 Jeonbuk Hyundai Motors season =

Jeonbuk Hyundai Motors
2020 season
- Chairman: Chung Eui-sun
- Manager: José Morais
- K League: 1st
- Korean FA Cup: Winners
- Champions League: Group Stage
- Top goalscorer: League: Han Kyo-won (11 goals); All: Han Kyo-won (13 goals)
- Lowest home attendance: 0
- Average home league attendance: 0
Home colours	Away colours

The 2020 season was Jeonbuk Hyundai Motors' 28th season in the K-League in South Korea. Jeonbuk Hyundai Motors is competing K League, Korean FA Cup and AFC Champions League. Jeonbuk is a defending champions of 2019 K-Keague. K League was supposed to kick off on February 29, however, due to the coronavirus, it is not yet clear when to kick off, on May 6, the Korean Football Association announced on May 8, match will be played behind the closed doors.

== Current squad ==
Squad No.	Name	Nationality	Position(s)	Date of birth (age)
Goalkeepers
1	Lee Bum-young	(South Korea)	GK	2 April 1989 (age 37)
2	Lee Yong	(South Korea)	DF	24 December 1986 (age 39)
3	Choi Hee-won	(South Korea)	DF	11 May 1999 (age 27)
4	Oh Ban-suk	(South Korea)	DF	20 May 1988 (age 38)
6	Choi Bo-kyung(c)	(South Korea)	DF	12 April 1988 (age 38)
7	Han Kyo-won	(South Korea)	MF	15 June 1990 (age 36)
8	Jeong Hyuk	(South Korea)	MF	21 May 1986 (age 40)
9	Gustavo	(Brazil)	FW	29 March 1994 (age 32)
10	Murilo Henrique	(Brazil)	MF	17 July 1997 (age 29)
11	Cho Gue-sung	(South Korea)	FW	25 January 1998 (age 28)
13	Kim Bo-kyung	(South Korea)	MF	6 October 1989 (age 37)
14	Lee Seung-gi	(South Korea)	MF	2 June 1988 (age 38)
15	Koo Ja-ryong	(South Korea)	DF	6 April 1992 (age 34)
17	Takahiro Kunimoto	(Japan)	MF	8 October 1997 (age 29)
18	Na Seong-eun	(South Korea)	DF	6 April 1996 (age 30)
19	Park Won-jae	(South Korea)	DF	28 May 1984 (age 42)
20	Lee Dong-gook	(South Korea)	FW	29 April 1979 (age 47)
21	Hong Jeong-nam	(South Korea)	GK	21 May 1988 (age 38)
23	Yun Ji-hyeok	(South Korea)	DF	7 February 1998 (age 28)
24	Kim Jae-seok	(South Korea)	MF	1 February 2001 (age 25)
25	Choi Chul-soon	(South Korea)	DF	8 February 1987 (age 39)
26	Hong Jeong-ho	(South Korea)	DF	12 August 1989 (age 37)
27	Myung Se-jin	(South Korea)	FW	24 May 2001 (age 25)
28	Son Jun-ho	(South Korea)	MF	12 May 1992 (age 34)
29	Lee Seong-yoon	(South Korea)	FW	31 October 2000 (age 26)
31	Song Bum-keun	(South Korea)	GK	15 October 1997 (age 29)
32	Lee Ju-yong	(South Korea)	DF	26 September 1992 (age 34)
34	Jang Yun-ho	(South Korea)	MF	26 September 1992 (age 34)
37	Barrow	(The Gambia) (Sweden)	MF	13 October 1992 (age 34)
44	Shin Hyung-min	(South Korea)	MF	18 July 1986 (age 40)
51	Kim Jung-hun	(South Korea)	GK	20 April 2001 (age 25)
57	Lee Soo-bin	(South Korea)	MF	7 May 2000 (age 26)
77	Lee Si-heon	(South Korea)	MF	4 May 1998 (age 28)
92	Kim Min-hyeok	(South Korea)	DF	27 February 1992 (age 34)

== Coaching staff ==
Position	Staff
Manager	(Portugal) José Morais
GK Coach	(South Korea) Lee Kwang-suk
Fitness Coach	(Portugal) Joao Cunha
Coach	(South Korea) Kim Sang-sik
Coach	(Portugal) Pedro Saraiva Ferreira
Coach	(South Korea) Ahn Jae-suk
Scouter	(South Korea) Kim Sang-rok

Last updated: 1 July 2020
Source: Hyundai Motors

== Competition ==
=== Overall ===
Competition	First match	Last match	Starting round	Final position	Record							
Competition	First match	Last match	Starting round	Final position	Pld	W	D	L	GF	GA	GD	Win %
K League	8 May 2020	1 November 2020	Matchday 1	Winner	27	19	3	5	46	21	+25	70.37
FA Cup	15 July 2020	8 November 2020	Round of 16	Winner	5	4	1	0	12	5	+7	80.00
Champions League	12 February 2020	4 December 2020	Group Stage	Group Stage	6	2	1	3	8	10	−2	33.33
Total					38	25	5	8	66	36	+30	65.79

Last updated: 4 December 2020
Source: Soccerway

==== Results summary ====
Overall								Home						Away					
Pld	W	D	L	GF	GA	GD	Pts	W	D	L	GF	GA	GD	W	D	L	GF	GA	GD
27	19	3	5	22	13	+9	60	11	1	2	12	3	+9	8	2	3	10	10	0

==== Results by round ====
Round	1	2	3	4	5	6	7	8	9	10	11	12	13	14	15	16	17	18	19	20	21	22	23	24	25	26	27
Ground	H	A	H	A	A	H	A	H	A	A	H	A	H	H	A	A	H	H	A	A	H	H	A	H	H	A	H
Result	W	W	W	L	W	W	W	W	W	L	D	D	W	W	W	W	W	L	L	D	W	W	W	L	W	W	W
Position	1	1	1	1	1	1	1	1	1	1	2	2	2	2	2	2	2	2	2	2	2	2	2	2	2	1	1

A = Away; H = Home; W = Win; D = Draw; L = Loss

==== League table ====
Pos	Team	Pld	W	D	L	GF	GA	GD	Pts	Qualification or relegation (Note: Teams are split into two groups (Final A and Final B) after each have played 22 matches.)
1	Jeonbuk Hyundai Motors (C)	27	19	3	5	46	21	+25	60	Qualification for Champions League group stage
2	Ulsan Hyundai	27	17	6	4	54	23	+31	57	Qualification for Champions League group stage
3	Pohang Steelers	27	15	5	7	56	35	+21	50	Qualification for Champions League group stage
4	Sangju Sangmu (Note: Sangju Sangmu were a military team and were not eligible to represent South Korea in the AFC club competitions. Additionally, they were relegated to K League 2 regardless of their final position by moving their stronghold the next season.) (R)	27	13	5	9	34	36	−2	44	Relegation to K League 2
5	Daegu FC	27	10	8	9	43	39	+4	38	Qualification for Champions League group stage

Source: K League
Rules for classification: 1) Points; 2) Goals scored; 3) Goal difference; 4) Wins; 5) Head-to-head points
(C) Champions; (R) Relegated

=== K League 1 ===
8 May 2020 1	Jeonbuk	1–0	Suwon	Jeonju, Jeonbuk
19:00 KST	Dong-Gook 84'; Lee Yong (yellow card) 12'	Report	Taggart (yellow card) 10'	Stadium: Jeonju World Cup Stadium; Attendance: 0 Referee: Kim Woo-sung

16 May 2020 2	Busan I'Park	1–2	Jeonbuk	Busan
19:00 KST	Lee (yellow card) 34'; Rômulo 66' (pen.)	Report	Hong 16'; Son (yellow card) 21'; Lee (yellow card) 69'; Veldwijk 90+3'	Stadium: Busan Gudeok Stadium; Attendance: 0 Referee: Kim Hee-Gon

24 May 2020 3	Jeonbuk	2–0	Daegu	Jeonju, Jeonbuk
16:30 KST	Murillo 47'; Lee (yellow card) 64'; Cho 70'; Cho (yellow card) 90+1' (yellow-red card) 90+2'	Report	Kim (yellow card) 25' (yellow-red card); Hong (yellow card) 65'	Stadium: Jeonju World Cup Stadium; Attendance: 0 Referee: Kim Dae-yong

30 May 2020 4	Gangwon	1–0	Jeonbuk	Gangneung, Gangwon-do
16:30 KST	Moo 37'; Kim (yellow card) 38'; Shin (yellow card) 45+1'; Lee (yellow card) 90'	Report	Hong (red card) 15'	Stadium: Gangneung Stadium; Attendance: 0 Referee: Kim Jong-hyeok

6 June 2020 5	Seoul	1–4	Jeonbuk	Mapo-gu, Seoul
16:30 KST	Park 45+2'; Kim (yellow card) 65'	Report	Han 44'; Seung-gi 52'; Dong-gook 59', 77'	Stadium: Seoul World Cup Stadium; Attendance: 0 Referee: Kim Hee-Gon

13 June 2020 6	Jeonbuk	1–0	Incheon	Jeonju, Jeonbuk
19:00 KST	Lee Dong-gook 56' (pen.); Murilo (yellow card) 80'	Summary	Lee Jae-sung (yellow card) 39'; Kim Tae-ho (yellow card) 68'; Jung Dong-yoon (yellow card) 73'; Kim Jeong-Ho (yellow card) 90+3'	Stadium: Jeonju World Cup Stadium; Attendance: 0 Referee: (South Korea) Kim Woo-Sung

16 June 2020 7	Pohang Steelers	1–2	Jeonbuk	Pohang
19:30 KST	Kim Sang-won (yellow card) 6'; Lee Seung-mo 41' (yellow card) 58'; Paločević (yellow card) 51'; O'Neill (yellow card) 56'; Iljutcenko (yellow card) 70'	Summary	Han Kyo-won 60'; Son Jun-ho (yellow card) 86'; Kim Min-hyeok 90+1'	Stadium: Pohang Steel Yard; Attendance: 0 Referee: (South Korea) Park Byung-Jin

21 June 2020 8	Jeonbuk	1–0	Gwangju	Jeonju, Jeonbuk
18:00 KST	Kim Jin-su (yellow card) 81'; Han Kyo-won 86'	Summary	Felipe (yellow card) 21'; Willyan (yellow card) 48'; Lee Min-ki (yellow card) 62'	Stadium: Jeonju World Cup Stadium; Attendance: 0 Referee: (South Korea) Chae Sang-Hyeop

28 June 2020 9	Ulsan	0–2	Jeonbuk	Ulsan
18:00 KST	Lee (yellow card) 17'; Kim Kee-hee (red card) 27'; Won Du-jae (yellow card) 73'; Lee Chung-yong (yellow card) 83'; Johnsen (yellow card) 83'	Report	Son (yellow card) 14'; Han Kyo-won 45'; Kunimoto 90+6'	Stadium: Ulsan Munsu Football Stadium; Attendance: 0 Referee: Kim Hee-Gon

5 July 2020 10	Sangju	1–0	Jeonbuk	Sangju, Gyeongsangbuk-do
19:00 KST	Kang 77' (pen.); Han (yellow card) 85'; An (yellow card) 90+1'; Lee (yellow card) 90+1'	Report	Lee Yong (yellow card) 17'; Lee (penalty missed) 54'; Hong (yellow card) 90+6'; Kim (red card) 90+7'	Stadium: Sangju Civic Stadium; Attendance: 0 Referee: Ko Hyung-jin

11 July 2020 11	Jeonbuk	2–2	Seongnam	Jeonju, Jeonbuk
19:00 KST	Han 55'; Lee 64'; Choi (yellow card) 76'; Lee (yellow card) 86'	Report	Lee 3'; Kim (yellow card) 45+2'; Park 45+3'; Ma (yellow card) 59'; Yu (yellow card) 71'; Na (yellow card) 74'	Stadium: Jeonju World Cup Stadium; Attendance: 0 Referee: Kim Woo-sung

19 July 2020 12	Incheon	1–1	Jeonbuk	Incheon
19:00 KST	Ji Eon-hak 6'; Kim Jun-Bum (yellow card) 20'; Kang Yun-Koo (yellow card) 24'; Aguilar (yellow card) 38'; Jung Dong-yoon (yellow card) 54'; Kim Ho-nam (yellow card) 72'; Mun Ji-Hwan (yellow card) 75'	Summary	Son Jun-ho (yellow card) 45+2'; Lee Ju-yong (yellow card) 74'; Lee Seung-gi 78'	Stadium: Incheon Football Stadium; Attendance: 0 Referee: (South Korea) Kim Hee-Gon

26 July 2020 13	Jeonbuk	3–0	Seoul	Jeonju
19:00 KST	Han Kyo-won 13'; Lee Seung-gi 45'; Gustavo (yellow card) 62'; Gustavo 63'	Summary		Stadium: Jeonju World Cup Stadium; Attendance: 0 Referee: (South Korea) Kim Hee-Gon

1 August 2020 14	Jeonbuk	2–1	Pohang	Jeonju
19:00 KST	Son Jun-ho 61'; Kim Bo-kyung 70'	Summary	Palacios (red card) 31'; Song Min-kyu 55'; Kang Hyeon-mu (yellow card) 70'; Iljutcenko (yellow card) 90'	Stadium: Jeonju World Cup Stadium; Attendance: 2,959; Referee: (South Korea) Kim Woo-Sung

8 August 2020 15	Daegu	0–2	Jeonbuk	Daegu
20:00 KST	Sin Chang-moo (yellow card) 90+1'	Summary	Han Kyo-Won (yellow card) 6'; Kim Bo-kyung 31', 44'	Stadium: DGB Daegu Bank Park; Attendance: 1,236; Referee: (South Korea) Kim Jong-hyeok

15 August 2020 16	Suwon	1 - 3	Jeonbuk	Suwon
19:00 KST	Taggart 83'	Summary	Han Kyo-won 22'; Kim Bo-kyung 32'; Gustavo 69'	Stadium: Suwon World Cup Stadium; Referee: (South Korea)

23 August 2020 17	Jeonbuk	2 - 1	Sangju Sangmu	Jeonju
19:00 KST	Lee Seong-yun 3'; Gustavo 88'		Oh Hyeon-gyu 14'	Stadium: Jeonju World Cup Stadium; Attendance: 0 Referee: (South Korea)

30 August 2020 18	Jeonbuk	1 - 2	Gangwon	Jeonju
19:00 KST	Goal		Goal	Stadium: Jeonju World Cup Stadium; Attendance: 0 Referee: (South Korea)

5 September 2020 19	Seongnam	2 - 0	Jeonbuk	Seongnam, Gyeonggi-do
17:30 KST	Goal			Stadium: Tancheon Stadium; Attendance: 0 Referee: (South Korea)

12 September 2020 20	Gwangju	3 - 3	Jeonbuk	Gwangju
16:30 KST	Goal		Goal	Stadium: Gwangju Football Stadium (Gwangju World Cup Auxiliary Stadium); Attendance: 0 Referee: (South Korea)

15 September 2020 21	Jeonbuk	2 - 1	Ulsan Hyundai	Jeonju
19:00 KST	Goal		Goal	Stadium: Jeonju World Cup Stadium; Attendance: 0 Referee: (South Korea)

20 September 2020 22	Jeonbuk	2 - 0	Busan IPark	Jeonju
15:00 KST	Goal			Stadium: Jeonju World Cup Stadium; Attendance: 0 Referee: (South Korea)

27 September 2020 23 (Final A)	Sangju	0 - 1	Jeonbuk	Sangju, Gyeongsangbuk-do
15:00 KST			Goal	Stadium: Sangju Civic Stadium; Attendance: 0

3 October 2020 24 (Final A)	Jeonbuk	0 - 1	Pohang	Jeonju
19:00 KST			Goal	Stadium: Jeonju World Cup Stadium; Attendance: 0 Referee: (South Korea)

18 October 2020 25 (Final A)	Jeonbuk	4 - 1	Gwangju	Jeonju
16:30 KST	Goal		Goal	Stadium: Jeonju World Cup Stadium; Referee: (South Korea)

25 October 2020 26 (Final A)	Ulsan Hyundai	0 - 1	Jeonbuk	Ulsan
16:30 KST			Modou Barrow 63'	Stadium: Ulsan Munsu Football Stadium; Referee: (South Korea)

1 November 2020 27 (Final A)	Jeonbuk	2 - 0	Daegu	Jeonju
15:00 KST	Cho Gue-sung 26', 39'			Stadium: Jeonju World Cup Stadium; Referee: (South Korea)

=== Korean FA Cup ===
15 July 2020 Round of 16	Jeonbuk	3–2 (a.e.t.)	Jeonnam Dragons	Jeonju, Jeonbuk
19:00 KST	Lee Seung-gi 17'; Son Jun-ho 96'; Kunimoto 100'		Lee Jong-ho 89'; Ha Seung-un 102'	Stadium: Jeonju World Cup Stadium; Attendance: 0

29 July 2020 Quarter-finals	Busan IPark	1–5	Jeonbuk	Busan
19:00 KST	Gustavo Vintecinco 4'; Kim Myoung-jun (yellow card) 69'	Summary	Cho Gue-sung 28'; Han Kyo-won 47'; Gustavo 71' 77' 81'	Stadium: Gudeok Stadium; Attendance: 0 Referee: (South Korea) Kim Dae-Yong

28 October 2020 Semi-finals	Jeonbuk	1 - 0	Seongnam FC	Jeonju
19:00 KST	Gustavo (?)			Stadium: Jeonju World Cup Stadium; Attendance: 0

4 November 2020 Final - 1st leg	Ulsan Hyundai	1–1	Jeonbuk	Ulsan
19:00 KST	Goal		Goal	Stadium: Ulsan Munsu Football Stadium; Referee: (South Korea)

8 November 2020 Final - 2nd leg	Jeonbuk	2 - 1	Ulsan Hyundai	Jeonju
14:00 KST	Goal		Goal	Stadium: Jeonju World Cup Stadium

Jeonbuk Hyundai Motors won by 3-2 aggregate.

=== AFC Champions League ===
==== Group stage ====
Pos	Team	Pld	W	D	L	GF	GA	GD	Pts	Qualification	YOK	SSI	JEO	SYD
1	(Japan) Yokohama F. Marinos	6	4	1	1	13	5	+8	13	Advance to knockout stage	—	1–2	4–1	4–0
2	(China) Shanghai SIPG	6	3	0	3	6	10	−4	9	Advance to knockout stage	0–1	—	0–2	0–4
3	(South Korea) Jeonbuk Hyundai Motors	6	2	1	3	8	10	−2	7		1–2	1–2	—	1–0
4	(Australia) Sydney FC	6	1	2	3	8	10	−2	5		1–1	1–2	2–2	—

Source: AFC

12 February 2020 Group Stage - Group H - Matchday 1	Jeonbuk Hyundai (South Korea)	1 - 2	(Japan) Yokohama F. Marinos	Jeonju, Jeonbuk
19:00 UTC+9	Cho Gue-sung 80'		Endo 32'; Kim Jin-su 37' (o.g.)	Stadium: Jeonju World Cup Stadium; Attendance: 6,546; Referee: Mohammed Abdullah Hassan Mohammed (United Arab Emirates)

4 March 2020 Group Stage - Group H - Matchday 3	Sydney FC (Australia)	2 - 2	(South Korea) Jeonbuk Hyundai	Sydney, NSW
19:30 UTC+11	Buhagiar 56'; Le Fondre 77' (pen.)		Brattan 50' (o.g.); Han Kyo-won 89'	Stadium: Jubilee Oval; Attendance: 3,255; Referee: Ahmed Al-Kaf (Oman)

22 November 2020 Group Stage - Group H - Matchday 2	Jeonbuk Hyundai (South Korea)	1 – 2	(China) Shanghai SIPG	Doha, (Qatar)
16:00 UTC+3	Gustavo 24'		Lü Wenjun 11'; Ricardo Lopes (yellow card) 38'; Yu Rui (yellow card) 50'; Hulk 82' (pen.); He Guan (yellow card) 87'; Fu Huan (yellow card) 90+4'	Stadium: Khalifa International Stadium; Attendance: 0 Referee: (United Arab Emirates) Ammar Al-Jeneibi

25 November 2020 Group Stage - Group H - Matchday 4	Jeonbuk Hyundai (South Korea)	1 - 0	(Australia) Sydney FC	Al Wakrah, (Qatar)
13:00 UTC+3	Na Seong-eun 44'			Stadium: Al Janoub Stadium; Attendance: 0 Referee: (Sri Lanka) Hettikamkanamge Perera

1 December 2020 Group Stage - Group H - Matchday 5	Yokohama F. Marinos (Japan)	4 - 1	(South Korea) Jeonbuk Hyundai	Al Wakrah, (Qatar)
13:00 UTC+3	Theerathon 17'; Júnior 51'; Nakagawa 71'; Song Bum-keun 83' (o.g.)		Gustavo 54' (pen.)	Stadium: Al Janoub Stadium; Attendance: 0 Referee: (Bahrain) Nawaf Shukralla

4 December 2020 Group Stage - Group H - Matchday 6	Shanghai SIPG (China)	0 - 2	(South Korea) Jeonbuk Hyundai	Doha, (Qatar)
13:00 UTC+3			Cho Gue-sung 16', 32' (pen.)	Stadium: Khalifa International Stadium; Attendance: 0 Referee: (Qatar) Saoud Al-Athbah

== Statistics ==
=== Appearances ===
Statistics accurate as of match played 8 May 2020

No.	Nat.	Pos.	Name	League		FA Cup		Champions League		Appearances		Goals
No.	Nat.	Pos.	Name	Apps	Goals	Apps	Goals	Apps	Goals	App (sub)	Total	Goals

=== Top scorers ===
Rnk	Pos	No.	Player	K League 1	FA Cup	Champions League	Total
1	FW	7	(South Korea) Han Kyo-won	6	1	0	7
2	FW	9	(Brazil) Gustavo	1	3	0	4
2	MF	14	(South Korea) Lee Seung-gi	2	1	0	3
4	MF	13	(South Korea) Kim Bo-kyung	3	0	0	3
4	FW	20	(South Korea) Lee Dong-Gook	3	0	0	3
6
6	FW	11	(South Korea) Cho Gue-sung	1	1	0	2
6	FW	17	(Japan) Takahiro Kunimoto	1	1	0	2
6	MF	28	(South Korea) Son Jun-ho	1	1	0	2
9	MF	10	(Brazil) Murillo	1	0	0	1
9	DF	26	(South Korea) Hong Jeong-ho	1	0	0	1
9	DF	92	(South Korea) Kim Min-hyeok	1	0	0	1
TOTALS				21	7	0	28

Rnk	Pos	No.	Players who left on Transfer windows	K League 1	FA Cup	Champions League	Total
1	FW	9	(Netherlands) Lars Veldwijk	1	0	0	1
TOTALS				1	0	0	1

=== Assists ===
Rnk	Pos	No.	Player	K League 1	FA Cup	Champions League	Total
1	FW	7	(South Korea) Han Kyo-won	2	1	0	3
1	MF	14	(South Korea) Lee Seung-gi	2	1	0	3
3	DF	92	(South Korea) Kim Min-hyeok	1	0	0	1
3	FW	11	(South Korea) Cho Gue-sung	1	0	0	1
3	FW	7	(The Gambia) Modou Barrow	1	0	0	1
3	FW	9	(Brazil) Gustavo	1	0	0	1
3	DF	26	(South Korea) Hong Jeong-ho	1	0	0	1
3	DF	28	(South Korea) Son Jung-ho	0	1	0	1
TOTALS				9	3	0	12

=== Clean sheets ===
The list is sorted by shirt number when total clean sheets are equal.

Rnk	No.	Player	K League 1	FA Cup	Champions League	Total
1	1	(South Korea) Lee Bum-young	4	0	0	4
TOTALS			4	0	0	4

Last updated: 12 August 2020.
Source: kleague.com
