= Lee Seung-gi (disambiguation) =

Lee Seung-gi (Korean: 이승기) is a Korean name consisting of the family name Lee and the given name Seung-gi. It may refer to:

- Lee Seung-gi (born 1987), a South Korean singer and actor
- Lee Seung-gi (footballer) (born 1988), a South Korean football player
- Ri Sung-gi (1905–1996), a North Korean chemist
