= Song Bum-keun =

South Korean footballer (born 1997)

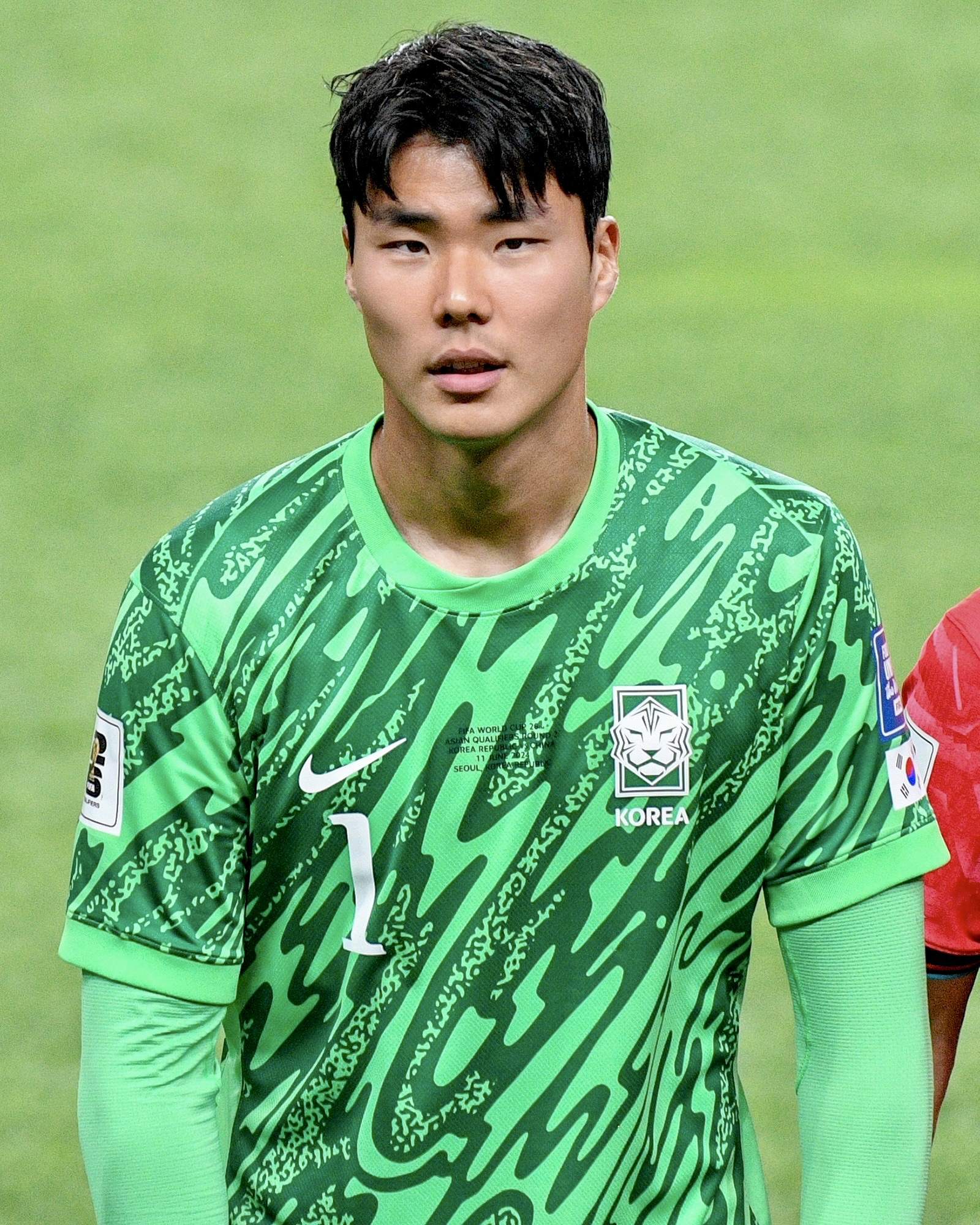
- Song in 2024

Personal information
- Full name: Song Bum-keun
- Date of birth: 15 October 1997 (age 29)
- Place of birth: Seongnam, South Korea
- Height: 1.94 m (6 ft 4 in)
- Position: Goalkeeper

Team information
- Current team: Jeonbuk Hyundai Motors
- Number: 31

Youth career
- 2013–2015: Yongun High School (Youth)

College career
Years	Team	Apps	(Gls)
2016–2017	Korea University		

Senior career*
Years	Team	Apps	(Gls)
2018–2022	Jeonbuk Hyundai Motors	167	(0)
2023–2024	Shonan Bellmare	44	(0)
2025–	Jeonbuk Hyundai Motors	72	(0)

International career^{‡}
2015–2017	South Korea U20	31	(0)
2017–2021	South Korea U23	23 (Note: Includes one appearance against another KFA team.)	(0)
2017	South Korea Universiade	6	(0)
2022–	South Korea	5	(0)
Medal record
Men's football
Representing South Korea
Asian Games
Gold medal – first place	2018 Jakarta-Palembang	Team
EAFF Championship
Runner-up	2022 Japan	Team
AFC U-23 Championship
Gold medal – first place	2020 Thailand
- * Club domestic league appearances and goals as of 8 November 2026 ‡ National team caps and goals as of 17 November 2026

- Song Bum-keun
- Hangul: 송범근
- Hanja: 宋範根
- RR: Song Beomgeun
- MR: Song Pŏmgŭn
- IPA: [soŋ.bʌm.ɡɯn]

Song Bum-keun (Korean: 송범근; born 15 October 1997) is a South Korean professional footballer who plays as a goalkeeper for K League 1 club Jeonbuk Hyundai Motors and the South Korea national team.

== Club career ==
=== Jeonbuk Hyundai Motors ===
On 20 February 2018, Song made his professional debut in 2018 AFC Champions League against Kitchee SC.

=== Shonan Bellmare ===
On 18 December 2022, Song officially joined Japanese side Shonan Bellmare on a permanent transfer.

=== Return to Jeonbuk Hyundai Motors ===
On 2 January 2025, Song returned to Jeonbuk, joining the club as a free agent.

== International career ==
Song has represented South Korea at all groups from under-18 to senior level. He was the team's first choice goalkeeper for the 2017 FIFA U-20 World Cup and the 2020 AFC U-23 Championship, winning the latter and being named Best Goalkeeper. In 2021, he represented South Korea at the Tokyo Olympic Games.

On 24 July 2022, Song made his debut for the senior Korea Republic national football team, keeping a clean sheet in a 3–0 win over Hong Kong in the 2022 EAFF E-1 Football Championship. Later that year, he was a member of the Korean squad at the 2022 FIFA World Cup, serving as back-up to Kim Seung-gyu and Jo Hyeon-woo.

On 16 May 2026, Song was named in South Korea's squad for the 2026 FIFA World Cup.

== Career statistics ==
=== Club ===
As of 8 November 2026.

Appearances and goals by club, season and competition
Club	Season	League			Cup		League Cup		Continental		Other		Total	
Club	Season	Division	Apps	Goals	Apps	Goals	Apps	Goals	Apps	Goals	Apps	Goals	Apps	Goals
Jeonbuk Hyundai Motors	2018	K League 1	30	0	0	0	—		8 (Note: Appearances in AFC Champions League Elite)	0	—		38	0
Jeonbuk Hyundai Motors	2019	K League 1	38	0	0	0	—		8	0	—		46	0
Jeonbuk Hyundai Motors	2020	K League 1	27	0	5	0	—		5	0	—		37	0
Jeonbuk Hyundai Motors	2021	K League 1	37	0	0	0	—		2	0	—		39	0
Jeonbuk Hyundai Motors	2022	K League 1	35	0	4	0	—		2	0	—		41	0
Jeonbuk Hyundai Motors	Total		167	0	9	0	—		25	0	—		201	0
Shonan Bellmare	2023	J1 League	24	0	1	0	2	0	—		—		27	0
Shonan Bellmare	2024	J1 League	20	0	1	0	1	0	—		—		22	0
Shonan Bellmare	Total		44	0	2	0	3	0	—		—		49	0
Jeonbuk Hyundai Motors	2025	K League 1	38	0	1	0	—		2 (Note: Appearances in AFC Champions League Two)	0	—		41	0
Jeonbuk Hyundai Motors	2026	K League 1	34	0	0	0	—		4	0	1 (Note: Appearance in K League Super Cup)	0	39	0
Jeonbuk Hyundai Motors	Total		72	0	1	0	—		6	0	1	0	80	0
Career total			283	0	12	0	3	0	31	0	1	0	330	0

=== International ===
As of match played 17 November 2026

Appearances and goals by national team and year
National team	Year	Apps	Goals
South Korea
South Korea	2022	1	0
South Korea	2023	0	0
South Korea	2024	0	0
South Korea	2025	1	0
South Korea	2026	3	0
Total		5	0

== Private life ==
In April 2024, it was announced by Antenna Entertainment that Song is in a romantic relationship with one of their artists, singer Lee Mijoo. In February 2025, It was reported that the two had broken up.

== Honours ==
Jeonbuk Hyundai Motors

- K League 1: 2018, 2019, 2020, 2021, 2025
- Korean FA Cup: 2020, 2022, 2025
- K League Super Cup: 2026

South Korea U23

- Asian Games: 2018
- AFC U-23 Championship: 2020

Individual

- AFC U-23 Championship Best Goalkeeper: 2020
- K League 1 Best XI: 2025
