= Gustavo Custódio =

Brazilian footballer (born 1997)

Personal information
- Full name: Gustavo Custódio dos Santos
- Date of birth: 9 March 1997 (age 29)
- Place of birth: São Paulo, Brazil
- Height: 1.72 m (5 ft 8 in)
- Position: Forward

Team information
- Current team: Retrô (on loan from Bahia)

Youth career
- Grêmio Osasco

Senior career*
Years	Team	Apps	(Gls)
2018	Audax	0	(0)
2018	→ Nacional-AM (loan)	4	(0)
2018	Guarulhos	16	(3)
2019	Jequié	8	(2)
2019–2020	Bahia	7	(1)
2020	Incheon United	3	(0)
2021–	Bahia	8	(0)
2021–	→ Retrô (loan)	12	(2)
- * Club domestic league appearances and goals as of 05:32, 25 October 2021 (UTC)

Gustavo Custódio dos Santos (born 9 March 1997), known as Gustavo Custódio or simply Gustavo, is a Brazilian footballer who plays as a forward for Paysandu.

== Club career ==
Born in São Paulo, Gustavo Custódio made his senior debut with Nacional-AM in 2018. In that year, he also represented Audax and Guarulhos.

On 9 December 2018, Gustavo Custódio joined Jequié for the ensuing campaign. The following 9 April, he moved to Bahia and was initially assigned to the under-23 squad.

On 29 May 2020, after helping his side win the 2020 Campeonato Baiano, Gustavo Custódio renewed his contract with Bahia until the end of 2021. On 6 July, however, he was transferred to K League 1 side Incheon United FC, who paid R$ 2.2 million for 80% of his economic rights.

On 9 November 2020, after only three matches for Incheon, Gustavo Custódio announced his departure from the club through his Instagram account. He subsequently returned to Bahia, being again assigned to the under-23 squad.

== Career statistics ==
As of 25 October 2021

Club	Season	League			State League		Cup		Continental		Other		Total	
Club	Season	Division	Apps	Goals	Apps	Goals	Apps	Goals	Apps	Goals	Apps	Goals	Apps	Goals
Nacional-AM	2018	Série D	0	0	4	0	0	0	—		—		4	0
Audax	2018	Paulista A2	—		0	0	—		—		1 (Note: Appearance (s) in Copa Paulista)	0	1	0
Guarulhos	2018	Paulista 2ª Divisão	—		16	3	—		—		—		16	3
Jequié	2019	Baiano	—		8	2	—		—		—		8	2
Bahia	2020	Série A	0	0	7	1	0	0	—		—		7	1
Incheon United	2020	K League 1	3	0	—		—		—		—		3	0
Bahia	2021	Série A	0	0	8	0	0	0	0	0	0	0	8	0
Retrô (loan)	2021	Série D	12	2	—		—		—		—		12	2
Total			15	2	43	6	0	0	0	0	1	0	59	8

== Honours ==
Bahia

- Campeonato Baiano: 2020
