= Kim Jae-heon =

South Korean footballer (born 1996)

Personal information
- Date of birth: 26 July 1996 (age 30)
- Place of birth: Seoul, South Korea
- Height: 1.73 m (5 ft 8 in)
- Position: Midfielder

Team information
- Current team: Gyeongju KHNP FC

Youth career
- 2012–2014: Portsmouth
- 2015–2016: Nike Academy

Senior career*
Years	Team	Apps	(Gls)
2018	Seoul Nowon United		
2019	Yeoju		
2019	Gangwon	0	(0)
2020–2021	Suwon	4	(0)
2021	Chungnam Asan	6	(0)
2022–	Gyeongju KHNP FC	18	(0)
- * Club domestic league appearances and goals as of 12:41, 22 October 2022 (AEST)

Kim Jae-heon (Korean: 김재헌; born 26 July 1996) is a South Korean professional footballer who plays as a midfielder for Gyeongju KHNP.

== Career ==
Kim joined Portsmouth in 2012, completing a two-year scholarship with the youth team before being released in 2014. Kim joined the FAB Academy based at the National Sports Centre before joining the Nike Academy where he was awarded Player of the Year for the 2015/16 season. In 2016, he spent time on trial at Charlton Athletic and Bristol Rovers.

After a one year absence from football, Kim went back to his native South Korea and joined Seoul Nowon United of the K3 League Basic ahead of the 2018 season. The following year, he joined fellow K3 League Basic side, Yeoju FC.

In July 2019, Kim joined Gangwon FC of K League 1, however left at the end of the season without making an appearance for the club.

Kim joined Suwon FC ahead of the 2020 K League 2 campaign. On 6 June 2020, he scored his first two goals for the club during the 10-0 victory over Hyochang FC in the 2020 Korean FA Cup second-round. At the end of the season, Suwon gained promotion to K League 1 after finishing as runners-up.

In July 2021, Kim joined K League 2 side Chungnam Asan on a permanent deal. He made his debut on 8 June in the 0-0 away draw with Busan IPark. After making six appearances, Kim left the club at the end of the season and is currently a free-agent.

== Career statistics ==
As of 29 May 2021

Appearances and goals by club, season and competition
Club	Season	League			Cup		Total	
Club	Season	Division	Apps	Goals	Apps	Goals	Apps	Goals
Gangwon FC	2019	K League 2	0	0	0	0	0	0
Suwon FC	2020	K League 2	4	0	3	2	7	2
Suwon FC	2021	K League 1	0	0	1	0	1	0
Chungnam Asan	2021	K League 2	6	0	0	0	6	0
Total			10	0	4	2	14	2
