= José Morais =

Portuguese football coach (born 1965)

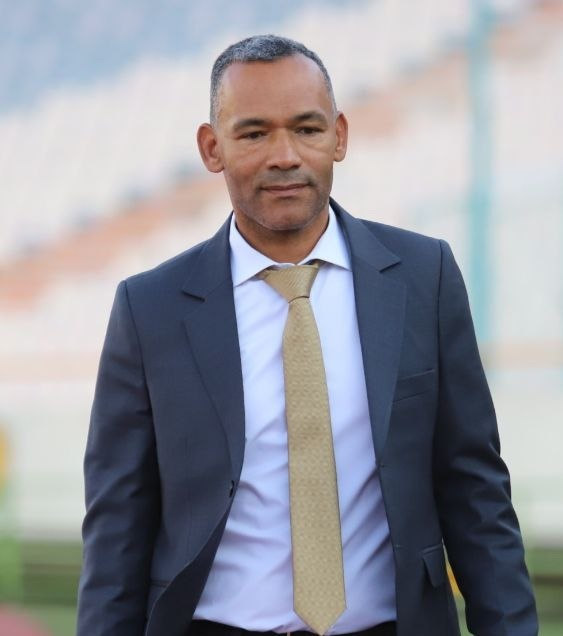
- Morais in August 2022

Personal information
- Full name: José Manuel Ferreira de Morais
- Date of birth: 27 July 1965 (age 61)
- Place of birth: Golungo Alto, Angola
- Position: Centre-back

Team information
- Current team: Sharjah (head coach)

Senior career*
Years	Team	Apps	(Gls)
1984–1986	União de Leiria		
1986–1988	Dragões de Alferrarede		
1988–1990	Atlético CP		
1990	→ Praiense (loan)		
1990–1991	Penafiel		

Managerial career
- 1999–2001: Benfica B
- 2001: Estoril
- 2002: Westfalia Herne
- 2003: Dresdner
- 2003–2004: Académico Viseu
- 2004: Santa Clara
- 2005: Assyriska FF
- 2006: Al-Faisaly
- 2007: Al-Shabab
- 2007–2008: Al-Hazem
- 2008: Stade Tunisien
- 2008: Yemen
- 2008–2009: Espérance de Tunis
- 2014: Al-Shabab
- 2015: Espérance de Tunis
- 2016: Antalyaspor
- 2016–2017: AEK Athens
- 2018: Barnsley
- 2018: Karpaty Lviv
- 2019–2020: Jeonbuk Hyundai Motors
- 2021: Al-Hilal
- 2022–2024: Sepahan
- 2025: Bodrum
- 2025: Al-Wahda
- 2025–: Sharjah
- * Club domestic league appearances and goals

José Manuel Ferreira de Morais (born 27 July 1965) is a Portuguese professional football manager and former player who is currently the head coach of UAE Pro League club Sharjah.

Morais arrived at Inter Milan in July 2009 to replace the departing André Villas-Boas, who took the head coaching position with Académica de Coimbra. Hired by fellow countryman José Mourinho, the two first met at Benfica in 2000.

After head coach Mourinho terminated his contract with Inter, Morais followed Mourinho to Real Madrid in June 2010. He later followed Mourinho to Chelsea in June 2013. He has since managed clubs across Europe, Asia, and the Middle East, winning two K League 1 titles with Jeonbuk Hyundai Motors in South Korea.

== Playing career ==
Morais' playing career started at the União de Leiria in 1984. He stayed there for two seasons before moving to Dragões de Alferrarede in 1986, playing there for two years. His next stint at Atlético CP lasted only one year. In 1990, he went on loan to Praiense before finally retiring in Penafiel after the 1990–91 season

Morais worked with the Benfica youth team among several football clubs in Portugal, Swedish club Assyriska, Tunisian club Espérance, as well as once holding the head coach position for the Yemen national team. On 27 April 2002, he became the coach of Westfalia Herne in the German fourth division. Between 20 January 2003 and 30 June, he was the head coach from two times German champion Dresdner SC in the German third league.

On 13 July 2006, Morais joined Saudi Arabian club Al-Faisaly as manager. He left the club on 16 December 2006 following a 5–1 defeat to Al-Ittihad. On 6 June 2014, Morais was named as new manager of Saudi side Al-Shabab. He won Saudi Super Cup title after defeating Al Nassr in penalty shootout in his first match as Al-Shabab manager. For the 2014–15 season, Morais took a one-year sabbatical to become manager of Saudi Arabian team Al-Shabab before returning to Chelsea for the start of pre-season ahead of the 2015–16 Premier League campaign. On 16 August 2018, Morais was appointed manager of Ukrainian Premier League club Karpaty Lviv. On 28 November 2018, Morais quit as manager of Ukrainian Premier League and was appointed as manager of South Korean K League 1 side Jeonbuk Hyundai Motors. He won the K League 1 in both of his first two seasons. In December 2020, he left Jeonbuk after his contract was terminated. In May 2021, Morais signed a contract until the end season with Saudi club Al Hilal. on 24 June 2022, Morais joined Persian Gulf Pro League side Sepahan on a new three-year deal. On 8 February 2025, he was appointed coach of Süper Lig side Bodrum FK on a deal until June 2025.

On 20 June 2025, Morais became the head coach of UAE Pro League club Al Wahda. In December that year, he was appointed as head coach of fellow Emirati side Sharjah.

== Managerial statistics ==
As of 6 September 2026

Managerial record by team and tenure
Team	Nat.	From	To	Record								Ref
Team	Nat.	From	To	G	W	D	L	GF	GA	GD	Win %	Ref
Dresdner SC	(Germany)	20 January 2003	30 June 2003	14	4	3	7	16	23	−7	28.57	
Académico de Viseu	(Portugal)	13 October 2003	9 July 2004	31	17	6	8	49	39	+10	54.84	
Santa Clara	(Portugal)	10 July 2004	13 November 2004	11	2	1	8	10	20	−10	18.18	
Assyriska	(Sweden)	25 January 2005	31 December 2005	30	6	4	20	24	56	−32	20.00	
Al-Faisaly	(Jordan)	17 July 2006	16 December 2006	11	6	4	1	14	5	+9	54.55	
Al-Shabab	(Saudi Arabia)	16 January 2007	30 June 2007	12	7	1	4	27	10	+17	58.33	
Al-Hazem	(Saudi Arabia)	20 July 2007	30 June 2008	26	9	6	11	31	33	−2	34.62	
Stade Tunisien	(Tunisia)	1 July 2008	25 August 2008	2	1	1	0	3	2	+1	50.00	
Yemen	(Yemen)	1 September 2008	16 November 2008	0	0	0	0	0	0	+0	—	
Espérance de Tunis	(Tunisia)	17 November 2008	8 March 2009	17	11	5	1	31	15	+16	64.71	
Al-Shabab	(Saudi Arabia)	1 July 2014	15 October 2014	8	6	1	1	16	8	+8	75.00	
Espérance de Tunis	(Tunisia)	8 February 2015	1 June 2015	19	14	2	3	37	13	+24	73.68	
Antalyaspor	(Turkey)	6 January 2016	6 October 2016	25	8	6	11	30	29	+1	32.00	
AEK Athens	(Greece)	18 October 2016	18 January 2017	14	3	8	3	21	13	+8	21.43	
Barnsley	(England)	16 February 2018	6 May 2018	15	3	4	8	18	27	−9	20.00	
Karpaty Lviv	(Ukraine)	16 August 2018	28 November 2018	14	5	3	6	21	20	+1	35.71	
Jeonbuk Hyundai Motors	(South Korea)	1 January 2019	6 December 2020	85	51	21	13	147	74	+73	60.00	
Al-Hilal	(Saudi Arabia)	4 May 2021	30 June 2021	4	3	1	0	10	4	+6	75.00	
Sepahan	(Iran)	1 July 2022	2 November 2024	88	52	17	19	154	78	+76	59.09	
Bodrum	(Turkey)	8 February 2025	30 June 2025	17	6	6	5	14	17	−3	35.29	
Al Wahda	(United Arab Emirates)	1 July 2025	12 December 2025	19	13	6	0	40	17	+23	68.42	
Sharjah	(United Arab Emirates)	17 December 2025	present	26	10	5	11	41	46	−5	38.46	
Career total				488	237	111	140	752	549	+203	48.57	—

== Honours ==
Espérance Tunis

- Tunisian Ligue Professionnelle 1: 2009–10

Al-Shabab

- Saudi Super Cup: 2014

Jeonbuk Hyundai Motors

- K League 1: 2019, 2020
- FA Cup: 2020

Al Hilal

- Saudi Professional League: 2020–21

Sepahan

- Hazfi Cup: 2023–24

Individual

- K League 1 Manager of the Year: 2019
