= Takahiro Kunimoto =

Japanese footballer (born 1997)

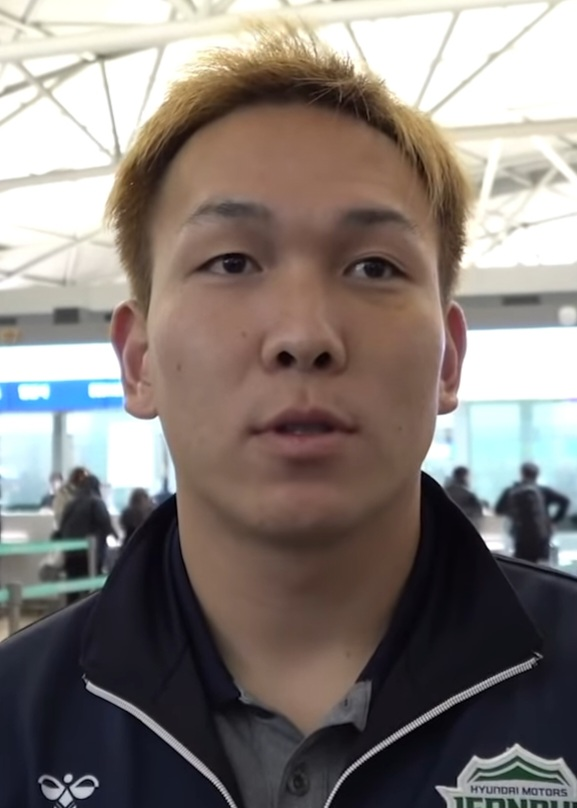
- Kunimoto in April 2025

Personal information
- Full name: Takahiro Kunimoto
- Date of birth: 8 October 1997 (age 29)
- Place of birth: Kitakyushu, Japan
- Height: 1.74 m (5 ft 8 1/2 in)
- Position: Attacking midfielder

Team information
- Current team: Liaoning Tieren
- Number: 10

Youth career
- FC NEO
- –2014: Urawa Red Diamonds

Senior career*
Years	Team	Apps	(Gls)
2015–2017	Avispa Fukuoka	25	(1)
2018–2019	Gyeongnam FC	63	(7)
2020–2022	Jeonbuk Hyundai Motors	64	(10)
2022–2023	Casa Pia	24	(1)
2023	Johor Darul Ta'zim	4	(0)
2024–	Liaoning Tieren	83	(15)
Medal record
J.League Cup
Runner-up	J.League Cup	2013
China League One
Winner	China League One	2025
- * Club domestic league appearances and goals as of 8 November 2026

Takahiro Kunimoto (邦本 宜裕, Kunimoto Takahiro; born 8 October 1997), known as Kuni, is a footballer who plays as an attacking midfielder for Chinese Super League club Liaoning Tieren.

== Club career ==
=== Avispa Fukuoka ===
On 12 January 2015, Kunimoto joined J2 League club, Avispa Fukuoka. He helped the club to a third place finished which see them qualified to the 2016 J1 League.

=== Gyeongnam FC ===
On 4 January 2018, Kunimoto joined K League 1 side, Gyeongnam FC ahead of the 2018 season. In his first season with the Korean club, he helped them to finished the season as league runner-ups.

=== Jeonbuk Hyundai Motors ===
On 9 January 2020, Kunimoto joined Jeonbuk Hyundai Motors. On 8 May, he made his first appearance against Suwon Samsung Bluewings. On 28 June 2020, he scored his first goal against Ulsan Hyunda. He would than go on to win the 2020 K League 1 league title and 2020 Korean FA Cup in his first season at the club. Kunimoto went on to win another league title in the 2022 K League 1 and also for his contribution in the 2022 Korean FA Cup, he won the Korean FA Cup medal. However Kunimoto contract was terminated on 13 July after a drunk-driving incident. He left Jeonbuk Hyundai and make 83 appearances scoring 13 goals and contributing 10 assist in all competitions with the clubhouse.

=== Casa Pia ===
On 27 July 2023, Kunimoto moved to Portugal to signed for Primeira Liga outfit, Casa Pia. He make his debut on 7 August 2022 against Santa Clara. On 29 August 2022, he scored his first goal for the club against Vitória Guimarães. Kunimoto decided to leave the club after 1 season in which he make 26 appearances in all competition during his time with the Portuguese club.

=== Johor Darul Ta'zim ===
Kunimoto signed a contract with Malaysia Super League giants, Johor Darul Ta'zim on 2 August 2023 replacing the foreign player slot with Leandro Velázquez who is out with an injury till the end of the year. He scored 2 goals and get 1 assist on his club debut in the 2023 Malaysia Cup match against Kelantan in a 10–0 thrashing victory. He won the 2023 Malaysia Super League title and the 2023 Malaysia Cup at the end of the season.

=== Liaoning Tieren ===
On 10 February 2024, Kunimoto joined China League One club Liaoning Tieren on a free transfer. On 9 March 2024, he make his debut for the club in a league match against Chongqing Tonglianglong playing the full match. On 9 June, Kunimoto scored his first goal for the club in a league match against Guangzhou.

== Career statistics ==
=== Club ===
As of match played 8 November 2026.

Appearances and goals by club, season and competition
Club	Season	League			Cup		League cup		Continental		Total	
Club	Season	Division	Apps	Goals	Apps	Goals	Apps	Goals	Apps	Goals	Apps	Goals
Avispa Fukuoka	2015	J2 League	4	0	0	0	—		—		4	0
Avispa Fukuoka	2016	J1 League	20	1	2	3	6	0	—		8	4
Avispa Fukuoka	2017	J2 League	1	0	0	0	0	0	—		1	0
Avispa Fukuoka	Total		25	1	4	3	6	0	—		13	4
Gyeongnam FC	2018	K League 1	35	5	1	0	—		—		36	5
Gyeongnam FC	2019	K League 1	28	2	1	0	—		4	2	33	4
Gyeongnam FC	Total		63	7	2	0	—		4	2	69	9
Jeonbuk Hyundai Motors	2020	K League 1	20	1	4	0	—		2	0	26	1
Jeonbuk Hyundai Motors	2021	K League 1	20	3	1	0	—		8	2	29	5
Jeonbuk Hyundai Motors	2022	K League 1	14	4	1	0	—		3	0	18	4
Jeonbuk Hyundai Motors	Total		54	8	6	0	—		13	2	83	12
Casa Pia	2022–23	Primeira Liga	24	1	1	0	1	0	—		26	1
Johor DT	2023	Malaysia Super League	4	0	—		4	2	0	0	8	2
Liaoning Tieren	2024	China League One	25	4	0	0	—		—		25	4
Liaoning Tieren	2025	China League One	29	5	1	0	—		—		30	5
Liaoning Tieren	2026	Chinese Super League	29	6	0	0	—		—		29	6
Liaoning Tieren	Total		83	15	1	0	—		—		84	15
Career total			263	35	14	3	11	2	17	4	305	44

== Honours ==
=== Club ===
Jeonbuk Hyundai Motors

- K League 1 (2): 2020, 2021
- Korean FA Cup (2): 2020, 2022

Johor Darul Ta'zim

- Malaysia Super League: 2023
- Malaysia Cup: 2023

Liaoning Tieren FC

- China League One: 2025
