= Son Jun-ho (footballer) =

South Korean footballer (born 1992)

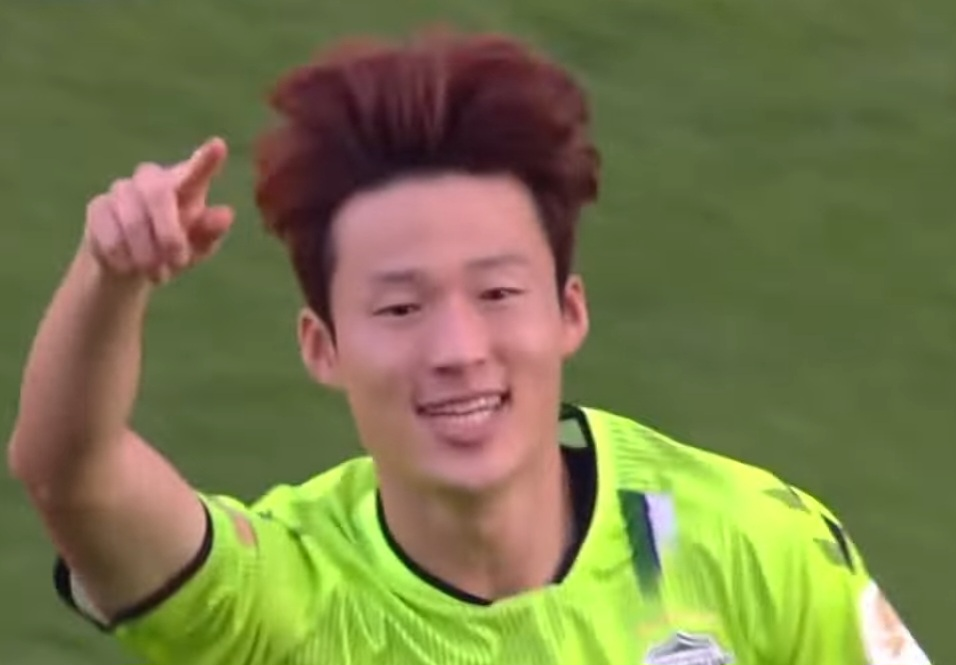
- Son with Jeonbuk Hyundai Motors

Personal information
- Full name: Son Jun-ho
- Date of birth: 12 May 1992 (age 34)
- Place of birth: Yeongdeok, South Korea
- Height: 1.78 m (5 ft 10 in)
- Position: Defensive midfielder

Team information
- Current team: Chungnam Asan
- Number: 10

Youth career
- 2005–2010: Pohang Steelers

College career
Years	Team	Apps	(Gls)
2011–2013	Yeungnam University		

Senior career*
Years	Team	Apps	(Gls)
2014–2017	Pohang Steelers	99	(14)
2018–2020	Jeonbuk Hyundai Motors	86	(11)
2021–2023	Shandong Taishan	46	(4)
2024	Gunyung FC	0	(0)
2024	Suwon FC	12	(1)
2025–	Chungnam Asan	53	(3)

International career^{‡}
2014	South Korea U23	6	(0)
2018–	South Korea	20	(0)
Medal record
Representing South Korea
Men's football
Asian Games
Gold medal – first place	2014 Incheon
EAFF Championship
Winner	2019 South Korea
- * Club domestic league appearances and goals as of 6 August 2026 ‡ National team caps and goals as of 28 March 2023

- Son Jun-ho
- Hangul: 손준호
- Hanja: 孫準浩
- RR: Son Junho
- MR: Son Chunho

Son Jun-ho (Korean: 손준호; born 12 May 1992) is a South Korean professional footballer who plays as a defensive midfielder for K League 2 club Chungnam Asan and the South Korea national team.

== Club career ==
=== Early career ===
After graduating from high school and Pohang Steelers academy, Son played for Yeungnam University in the U-League. In 2013, he was named the U-League Most Valuable Player by leading his university to a league title. The next year, he returned to Pohang Steelers, where he played as a youth player, and made his professional debut.

=== Jeonbuk Hyundai Motors ===
Before the start of the 2018 season, Son joined Jeonbuk Hyundai Motors on a four-year contract. While playing for Jeonbuk, he won three consecutive K League 1 titles, and especially contributed to Jeonbuk's first-ever Double in 2020 when he was selected as the K League 1 Most Valuable Player.

=== Shandong Taishan ===
On 13 January 2021, Son joined Chinese Super League club Shandong Taishan. He quickly showed large influence, leading Shandong to a league title in his first CSL season. He was regarded as the league's best player, but the award ceremony was not held at the end of the season.

=== Match-fixing allegations and trial ===
On 15 May 2023, however, Son was reportedly investigated by public security authorities in Liaoning due to match-fixing allegations involving former Shandong Taishan manager Hao Wei. The following day, Chinese Foreign Ministry spokesperson Wang Wenbin said that he had been detained for a suspected bribery case.

After ten months of detention by Chinese authorities, Son was released and returned to South Korea on 25 March 2024. For about two months, he trained at Jeonbuk Hyundai Motors and played for fifth division club Gunyung FC. He was expected to join Jeonbuk, but the negotiation with the club broke down due to the suspicion. On 14 June, he joined another K League 1 club Suwon FC with the help of Choi Soon-ho, the director of Suwon and his former manager.

On 10 September, Chinese Football Association (CFA) announced that Son was banned from football-related activities in China for lifetime for involving in match-fixing. It also notified FIFA and Korea Football Association of the disciplinary action against him. The next day, he held a press conference to deny the verdict. He claimed that he made a false confession due to oppressive investigation and did not know why match fixer Jin Jingdao sent ¥200,000 to his account. On 13 September, Suwon FC terminated the contract with him and was criticised for wasting citizens' tax money.

=== Chungnam Asan ===
On 24 January 2025, FIFA dismissed CFA's request due to lack of evidence and Son could continue his football career outside China. On 6 February, he joined K League 2 club Chungnam Asan. In the middle of the season, Chungnam Asan announced Son became their new captain on 5 August, but Kim Seung-ho wore the armband in a league match against Gyeongnam FC four days after the announcement due to strong opposition from their supporters club.

== International career ==
Son would make his first senior appearance for South Korea in a friendlies match on 27 January 2018 against Moldova, where he came on as a substitute for Kim Sung-joon in a 1–0 victory.

== Style of play ==
Son usually played as a defensive midfielder, and was good at duel, interception, recovery, and long-distance pass.

== Career statistics ==
As of 23 November 2025

Appearances and goals by club, season and competition
Team	Season	League			National cup		Continental		Other		Total	
Team	Season	Division	Apps	Goals	Apps	Goals	Apps	Goals	Apps	Goals	Apps	Goals
Pohang Steelers	2014	K League 1	25	1	2	0	7 (Note: Appearances in AFC Champions League)	1	—		34	2
Pohang Steelers	2015	K League 1	35	9	3	0	—		—		38	9
Pohang Steelers	2016	K League 1	4	0	0	0	3	1	—		7	1
Pohang Steelers	2017	K League 1	35	4	1	0	—		—		36	4
Pohang Steelers	Total		99	14	6	0	10	2	—		115	16
Jeonbuk Hyundai Motors	2018	K League 1	30	4	2	1	7	1	—		39	6
Jeonbuk Hyundai Motors	2019	K League 1	31	5	1	0	7	0	—		39	5
Jeonbuk Hyundai Motors	2020	K League 1	25	2	5	1	1	0	—		31	3
Jeonbuk Hyundai Motors	Total		86	11	8	2	15	1	—		109	14
Shandong Taishan	2021	Chinese Super League	21	4	6	0	—		—		27	4
Shandong Taishan	2022	Chinese Super League	19	0	4	1	0	0	—		23	1
Shandong Taishan	2023	Chinese Super League	6	0	0	0	0	0	1 (Note: Appearance in Chinese Super Cup)	0	7	0
Shandong Taishan	Total		46	4	10	1	0	0	1	0	57	5
Suwon FC	2024	K League 1	12	1	—		—		—		12	1
Chungnam Asan	2025	K League 2	35	2	0	0	—		—		35	2
Career total			278	32	24	3	25	3	1	0	328	38

== Honours ==
Jeonbuk Hyundai Motors

- K League 1: 2018, 2019, 2020
- Korean FA Cup: 2020

Shandong Taishan

- Chinese Super League: 2021
- Chinese FA Cup: 2021, 2022

South Korea U23

- Asian Games: 2014

South Korea

- EAFF Championship: 2019

Individual

- K League All-Star: 2015, 2017
- K League 1 top assist provider: 2017
- K League 1 Most Valuable Player: 2020
- K League 1 Best XI: 2020
