= Seung-gi =

- Hangul: 승기
- RR: Seunggi
- MR: Sŭnggi

Seung-gi, also spelled Seung-ki or Sung-gi, is a Korean given name.

People with this name include:

- Ri Sung-gi (1905–1996), North Korean chemist
- Lee Seung-gi (born 1987), South Korean singer and actor
- Lee Seung-gi (footballer) (born 1988), South Korean footballer

== See also ==
- List of Korean given names
