= Kim Myoung-jun =

South Korean footballer (born 1994)

Personal information
- Date of birth: 13 May 1994 (age 32)
- Place of birth: Busan, South Korea
- Height: 1.83 m (6 ft 0 in)
- Position: Centre-back

Team information
- Current team: Gyeongnam
- Number: 22

Youth career
- 2010–2012: Daeryun High School
- 2013–2015: Yeungnam University

Senior career*
| Years | Team | Apps | (Gls) |
| 2015–2021 | Busan I'Park | 111 | (4) |
| 2021– | Gyeongnam | 18 | (1) |
- * Club domestic league appearances and goals as of 23 May 2022

- Kim Myoung-jun
- Hangul: 김명준
- Hanja: 金明俊
- RR: Gim Myeongjun
- MR: Kim Myŏngjun

Kim Myoung-jun (Korean: 김명준; born May 13, 1994) is a South Korean professional footballer who plays as a centre-back for Gyeongnam.

== Club career ==
Kim made his debut for Busan IPark on 25 April 2015 in a 1-1 draw with Ulsan. His first professional goal came on 19 August in a 4-2 defeat to Seoul. In February 2018, he changed his name from Kim Jong-hyuk to Kim Myoung-joon.

== Club career statistics ==
As of 8 November 2020

| Club performance | | | League | | Cup | | Play-offs | | Total | |
| Season | Club | League | Apps | Goals | Apps | Goals | Apps | Goals | Apps | Goals |
| South Korea | | | League | | KFA Cup | | Play-offs | | Total | |
|---|---|---|---|---|---|---|---|---|---|---|
| 2015 | Busan IPark | K League 1 | 16 | 1 | 0 | 0 | 2 | 0 | 18 | 1 |
| 2016 | Busan IPark | K League 2 | 16 | 0 | 2 | 0 | 0 | 0 | 18 | 0 |
| 2017 | Busan IPark | K League 2 | 10 | 0 | 4 | 0 | 0 | 0 | 14 | 0 |
| 2018 | Busan IPark | K League 2 | 29 | 1 | 1 | 0 | 1 | 0 | 31 | 1 |
| 2019 | Busan IPark | K League 2 | 32 | 2 | 0 | 0 | 2 | 0 | 34 | 2 |
| 2020 | Busan IPark | K League 1 | 8 | 0 | 3 | 0 | 0 | 0 | 11 | 0 |
| Career total | | | 111 | 4 | 10 | 0 | 5 | 0 | 126 | 4 |
