= Kim Min-hyeok (footballer, born February 1992) =

South Korean footballer

Kim Min-hyeok 김민혁
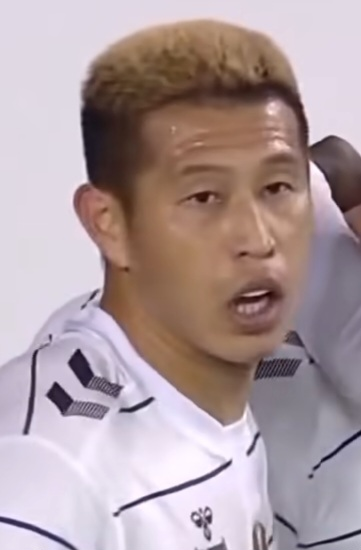

Personal information
- Date of birth: February 27, 1992 (age 34)
- Place of birth: Seoul, South Korea
- Height: 1.87 m (6 ft 2 in)
- Position: Centre-back

Team information
- Current team: PSGC Ciamis
- Number: 92

Youth career
- 2007–2009: Suncheon High School
- 2008–2009: → Hamburger SV

College career
Years	Team	Apps	(Gls)
2010–2013	Soongsil University		

Senior career*
Years	Team	Apps	(Gls)
2014–2018	Sagan Tosu	145	(3)
2019–2021	Jeonbuk Hyundai Motors	62	(3)
2022–2023	Seongnam FC	4	(1)
2023–2025	Buriram United	57	(1)
2025	Chungnam Asan	5	(0)
2026–	PSGC Ciamis	1	(0)

International career
2014	South Korea U23	6	(0)
Medal record
Representing South Korea
Asian Games
Gold medal – first place	2014 Incheon	Team
- * Club domestic league appearances and goals as of 19 September 2026

- Kim Min-hyeok
- Hangul: 김민혁
- Hanja: 金敏爀
- RR: Gim Minhyeok
- MR: Kim Minhyŏk

Kim Min-hyeok (Korean: 김민혁; born 27 February 1992) is a South Korean professional footballer who plays as a centre-back for Championship club PSGC Ciamis.

== Club career ==
He played for the youth academy of Hamburger SV before joining the same of Soongsil University in 2009. In 2014, he signed for Sagan Tosu. He made his debut against Urawa Reds.

== International career ==
Kim was part of the senior South Korea squad for the 2015 EAFF East Asian Cup.

== Career statistics ==
As of 12 May 2024

Appearances and goals by club, season and competition
Club	Season	League			National cup		League Cup		Continental		Total	
Club	Season	Division	Apps	Goals	Apps	Goals	Apps	Goals	Apps	Goals	Apps	Goals
Sagan Tosu	2014	J1 League	27	0	2	0	1	0	—		30	0
Sagan Tosu	2015	J1 League	25	0	3	0	4	1	—		32	1
Sagan Tosu	2016	J1 League	33	0	2	0	3	0	—		38	0
Sagan Tosu	2017	J1 League	33	3	2	0	3	0	—		38	3
Sagan Tosu	2018	J1 League	27	0	3	0	6	0	—		36	0
Sagan Tosu	Total		145	3	12	0	17	1	0	0	174	4
Jeonbuk Hyundai Motors	2019	K League 1	26	1	1	0	—		8	0	35	1
Jeonbuk Hyundai Motors	2020	K League 1	15	1	4	0	—		5	0	24	1
Jeonbuk Hyundai Motors	2021	K League 1	21	1	0	0	—		6	0	27	1
Jeonbuk Hyundai Motors	Total		62	3	5	0	0	0	19	0	86	3
Seongnam FC	2022	K League 1	4	1	1	0	—		—		5	1
Buriram United	2023–24	Thai League 1	28	1	2	0	3	1	5	0	38	2
Career total			239	8	20	0	20	2	24	0	303	10

== Honours ==
Jeonbuk Hyundai Motors

- K League 1: 2019, 2020, 2021
- Korean FA Cup: 2020

Buriram United

- Thai League: 2023–24, 2024–25
- Thai League Cup: 2024–25
- ASEAN Club Championship: 2024–25
