= Lee Chung-yong =

South Korean footballer (born 1988)

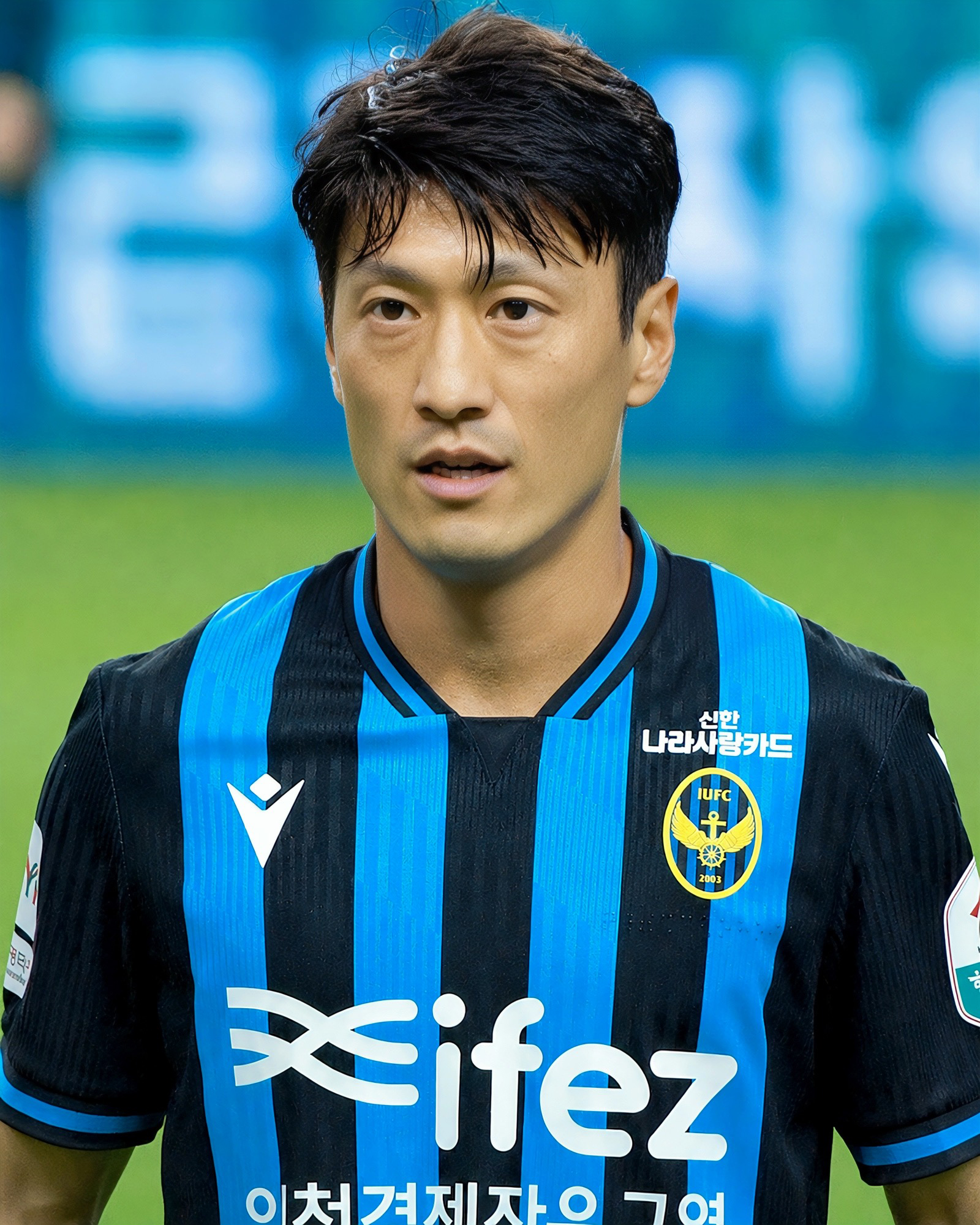
- Lee with Incheon United in 2026

Personal information
- Full name: Lee Chung-yong
- Date of birth: 2 July 1988 (age 38)
- Place of birth: Seoul, South Korea
- Height: 1.80 m (5 ft 11 in)
- Position: Winger

Team information
- Current team: Incheon United
- Number: 72

Youth career
- 2003–2004: FC Seoul

Senior career*
Years	Team	Apps	(Gls)
2004–2009	FC Seoul	52	(11)
2009–2015	Bolton Wanderers	176	(17)
2015–2018	Crystal Palace	38	(1)
2018–2020	VfL Bochum	35	(1)
2020–2025	Ulsan HD	161	(16)
2026–	Incheon United	21	(1)

International career^{‡}
2003–2005	South Korea U17	6	(6)
2006–2007	South Korea U20	18	(1)
2007–2008	South Korea Olympic	7	(0)
2008–2019	South Korea	89	(9)
Medal record
Representing South Korea
Men's football
AFC Asian Cup
Runner-up	2015 Australia
Bronze medal – third place	2011 Qatar
AFC Youth Championship
Bronze medal – third place	2006 India
- * Club domestic league appearances and goals as of 3 August 2026 ‡ National team caps and goals as of 12 July 2020 (UTC)

- Lee Chung-yong
- Hangul: 이청용
- Hanja: 李菁龍
- RR: I Cheongyong
- MR: I Ch'ŏngyong

Lee Chung-yong (Korean: 이청용; Korean pronunciation: [i.tɕʰʌŋ.joŋ]; born 2 July 1988) is a South Korean footballer who plays as a winger for K League 1 club Incheon United and the South Korea national football team. He is nicknamed the "Blue Dragon", which is a literal translation of his given name "Chung-yong".

Lee started his club career with FC Seoul in the 2004 season. In 2009, he moved to England and joined Premier League club Bolton Wanderers, making 176 appearances and scoring 17 goals. Lee left Bolton after signing with Crystal Palace in 2015 for an undisclosed fee. After three years at Palace, he played for German side VfL Bochum for two seasons, before returning back to his native South Korea where he still remains active today.

In January 2009, The Times named Lee as one of the top 50 rising stars in football.

== Early life ==
Lee's football career started at the age of 11. Although considered to have started too late by some, his enormous talent was evident and his reputation grew among the Seoul youth football development community.

== Club career ==
=== FC Seoul ===
In 2003, FC Seoul, then known as Anyang LG Cheetahs in its modern incarnation, manager Cho Kwang-rae began focusing on developing a youth academy within the team. Lee, who, at the time, was attending Dobong Middle School caught the eye of a scout and manager Cho decided to attend his match. After watching only the first half, he was certain Lee had a massive potential, and decided to sign him on the spot. Subsequently, Lee dropped out of the school and joined FC Seoul. Dropping out of middle school could mean a lot later in his life since Korea does not draft middle school dropouts for its military. FC Seoul at the time signed a handful of youngsters this way, with the most prominent ones being Lee Chung-yong himself, Ko Yo-han, Koh Myong-jin and Song Jin-hyung. He was a substitute in the 2004 League Cup, In 2006, he debuted in the K League. For the next several years, Lee honed his skills in the FC Seoul reserves alongside close friend and international teammate Ki Sung-yueng.

In 2007, Şenol Güneş, famous for coaching the third-placed Turkey national squad in the 2002 FIFA World Cup, joined FC Seoul as manager. After watching the youngsters Koh Myong-jin, Ki Sung-yueng and Lee Chung-yong carefully, he recognized the players' significant abilities and aimed to use them as important elements in the FC Seoul first team. That season, Lee Chung-yong began to break into the first team, playing in 15 league matches and scoring three goals.

The following year, in 2008, he cemented his place as a regular for FC Seoul, playing 22 league matches, scoring five goals. Both he and Ki Sung-yong won many domestic league fans for their link-up play and individual qualities so much so that they were both given the affectionate moniker "Ssang Yong" or "Double Dragon", a play on their given names.

In the 2009 season, Lee continued his good form and he completed a hat-trick of assists in the opening game of the season against Chunnam Dragons on 7 March 2009. On 4 April 2009, he scored the winning goal in a match against Seoul's fierce rival, Suwon Samsung Bluewings.

=== Bolton Wanderers ===
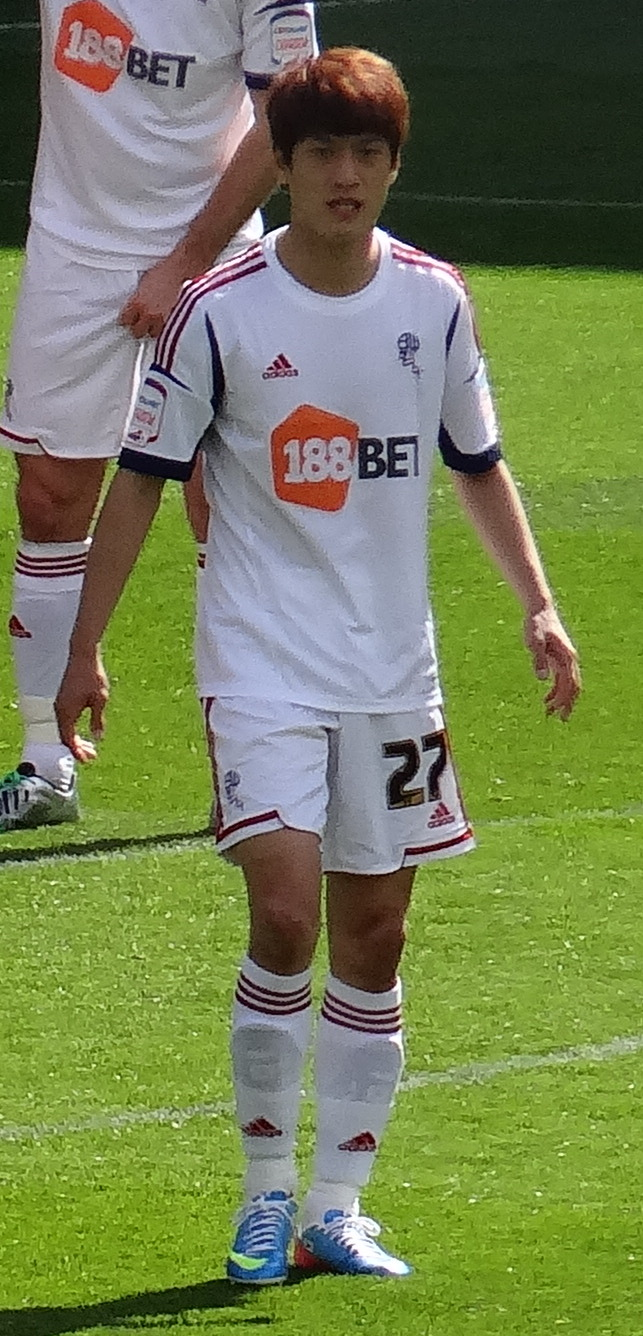
Lee playing for Bolton Wanderers in 2013

FC Seoul confirmed that Lee Chung-yong had agreed a deal to join Premier League side Bolton Wanderers. A statement from FC Seoul said: "The contract will be signed officially after a work permit is issued." On 29 July 2009, it was announced that he had been granted a work permit allowing him to complete a £2.2 million transfer from FC Seoul. He had already agreed personal terms on a three-year contract with Bolton the previous week and also underwent a successful medical. The transfer was officially confirmed on 14 August 2009, Lee was reported as stating "I am looking forward to this new chapter in my career and cannot wait to play my first game for my new club." With Gary Megson's dismissal in December 2009, he became his last full signing for the club.

He made his first Bolton appearance on 15 August 2009 when coming on as a substitute for Gavin McCann in the 1–0 defeat against Sunderland at the Reebok Stadium and scored his first goal, the winning goal of the match in a 2–1 victory against Birmingham City on 26 September. He was named Man of the Match in the match against Tottenham Hotspur, providing teammate Ricardo Gardner with an assist. As a result of these good performances, Lee was named in the ESPN Soccernet Team of the Week twice in a row. His good form in his first season continued weeks later, after the international break, as he assisted Ivan Klasnic's first goal in the 3–3 draw against Manchester City at the Reebok Stadium. He was consequently named 'Man of the Match' by Sky Sports for his significant attacking presence and dribbling prowess: "The South Korean was a constant thorn in City's side and looks to be a real find for Gary Megson."

At the end of his first season, Lee won a triumvirate of awards including Bolton Player of the Year, Players' Player of the Year, and best newcomer awards. There was interest from Liverpool after the 2010 FIFA World Cup, but Lee stated that it was likely that he would remain at Bolton for the 2010–11 Premier League, and on 25 November he signed an extension to his contract, keeping him at the club until 2013.

During a pre-season friendly against Newport County on 30 July 2011, Lee suffered a broken leg after a challenge from Tom Miller. It was initially reported that the injury would rule Lee out for a minimum of nine months, but by early September, Bolton were hopeful that the player would return before the end of the season. Towards the end of April 2012, Lee started training with the Bolton first team again and was hopeful of playing a game or two before the season concluded.

On 4 May 2012, manager Owen Coyle ruled out a return for Lee that season, but just two days later Lee returned to action as a second-half substitute for Martin Petrov in Bolton's 2–2 draw with West Bromwich Albion, and received a standing ovation from the home crowd. On 29 May 2012 it was confirmed that Lee had signed an unannounced new contract the previous summer, extending his stay at the Reebok to the end of the 2014–15 season. Every game Lee had scored in for Bolton, Bolton had won. This streak was broken however on 27 October 2012 as Bolton lost 2–1 to Middlesbrough with Bolton's goal coming from Lee.

In the 2012–13 season, Lee was eased back into the first-team fold as he worked his way back to full fitness. After such a serious injury, it took Lee several months to regain the sharpness that he had displayed in his first two seasons with the club. However, during the second half of the season, Lee appeared to be getting closer to the form which marked him out as one of South Korea's top footballing talents. He finished the season with a respectable return of four goals and seven assists in the Championship.

Lee remained in the Championship with Bolton for the 2013–14 season. He scored in each of the last two games of the season as Bolton finished 14th in the table.

=== Crystal Palace ===
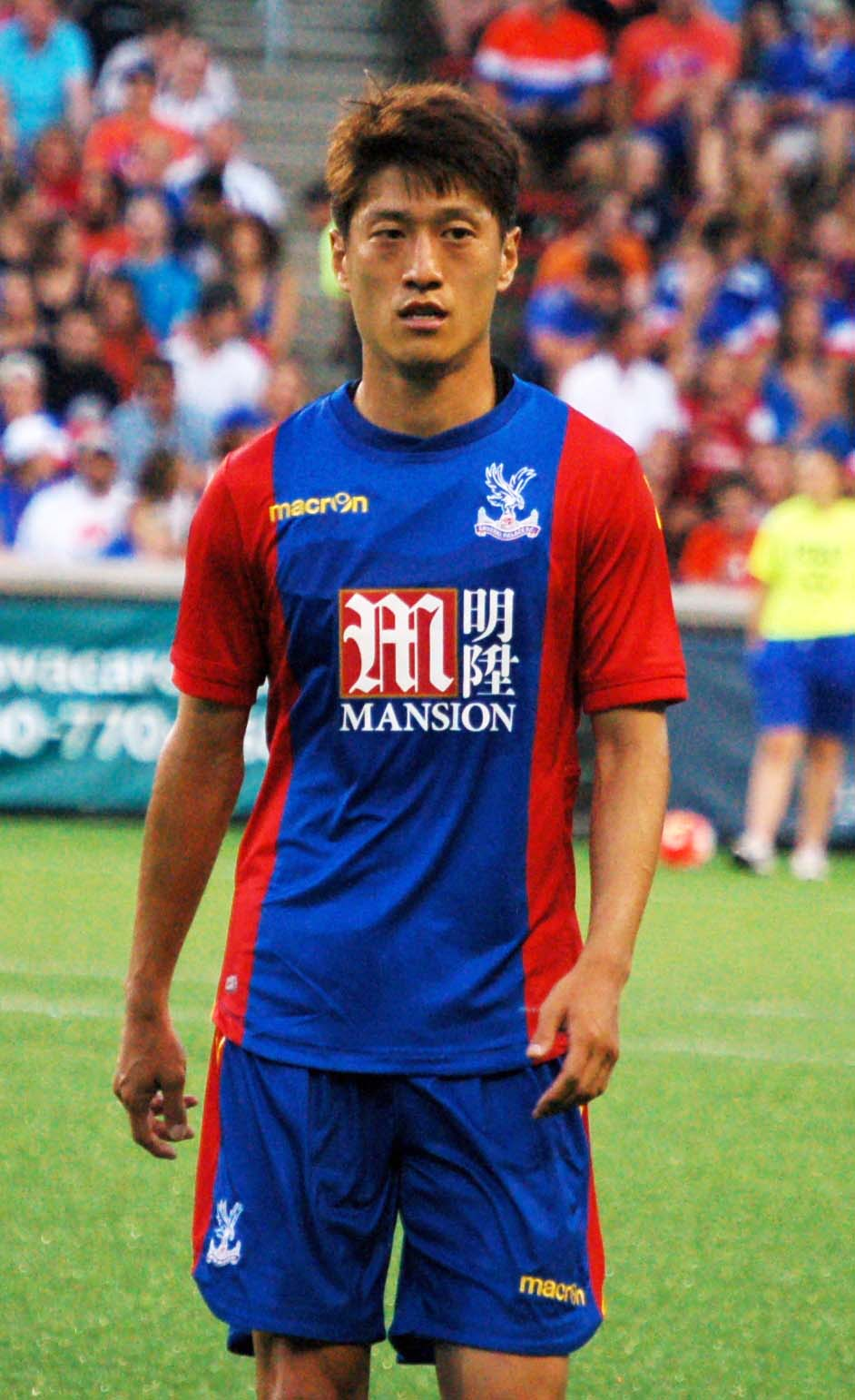
Lee with Crystal Palace in 2016

On 2 February 2015, transfer deadline day, Lee signed for Premier League side Crystal Palace for an undisclosed fee with Barry Bannan going the other way on loan. Lee's contract ran until June 2018. He scored his first goal for the club against Shrewsbury Town in the League Cup on 25 August 2015. He scored his first league goal for Palace with a 30-yard volley at the 90th minute to defeat Stoke City 2–1 on 19 December 2015.

In June 2018, Lee was released by Crystal Palace on the expiry of his contract. Bolton attempted to re-sign their former player, but Lee failed to get a work permit, cancelling the move. This was the second time in 2018 Bolton had failed to sign Lee, as in February he had agreed to join on loan, only for Crystal Palace director of football, Dougie Freedman (who previously managed Bolton whilst Lee played there) to cancel the loan deal after it had been agreed, due to an injury to Bakary Sako. Lee was packing to travel to Bolton when informed of this.

=== VfL Bochum ===
On 6 September 2018, Lee signed for 2. Bundesliga side VfL Bochum on a contract until the end of the 2018–19 season with an option for extension thereafter. He scored a goal and provided six assists during 23 appearances in the 2018–19 2. Bundesliga. The German football magazine kicker gave him the 26th-highest score in its statistics about all 2. Bundesliga players.

=== Ulsan HD ===
On 4 March 2020, Lee signed for K League 1 club Ulsan Hyundai (renamed Ulsan HD in 2024). Since moving to Ulsan HD, he helped his team win three consecutive league titles from 2022 to 2024 and an AFC Champions League title in 2020. Especially, he received the K League Most Valuable Player Award for the first time in 2022. In the middle of the 2025 season, however, he was criticised by media and fans for his behavior towards manager Shin Tae-yong. He and other veteran players were in conflict with Shin, and their conflict was followed by danger of the club's relegation. In the first match after Shin was sacked, he scored a penalty goal and showed a controversial goal celebration to taunt Shin. Defending champions Ulsan avoided relegation by finishing ninth among twelve clubs, but did not extend their contract with him.

== International career ==
Lee's international career started as part of the South Korea under-20 squad in the 2007 FIFA U-20 World Cup. Despite impressing against quality opposition including the United States, Brazil, and Poland, South Korea failed to make the cut for the next round. Lee's individual performances, however, were enough to impress many neutrals and rumored to have caught the eye of many European scouts.

After his under-20 tenure, Lee was part of the unsuccessful national under-23 team for the 2008 Summer Olympics. When Olympics were being held, Koreans nominated Lee as the most anticipated player among Korean football players. His first under-23 match was against Syria in Damascus, 17 October 2007.

On 31 May 2008, Lee made his national team debut for a 2010 FIFA World Cup qualification match against Jordan. He would score his first national team goal against the same team in the return leg at home on 5 September 2008 in Seoul World Cup Stadium. Lee was one of the most consistent and important players in South Korea's successful seventh consecutive qualification for the FIFA World Cup and eighth overall, an Asian record. On 17 June 2010, Lee scored an injury time goal in the first half against Argentina in the 2010 FIFA World Cup. Lee scored again in the round of 16 match against Uruguay in South Korea's 2–1 defeat. He was named in the top 10 rising stars of the 2010 FIFA World Cup by Sports Illustrated.

On 15 October 2013, Lee made his 50th appearance for the Korean national team in a friendly match against Mali. Lee provided two assists as Korea won the game 3–1. One month later, Lee captained the side in a friendly against Switzerland and scored the winning goal with an 87th-minute header. It was his first international goal in more than three years, his last coming in the 2010 World Cup. Lee was selected for the South Korea squad for the 2014 FIFA World Cup in Brazil. He started all three games as Korea were eliminated at the group stage. In the last minutes of the game against Belgium, he made a late challenge on Anthony Vanden Borre, ruling the Belgian out for injury for the rest of the tournament as a result.

Lee was included in South Korea's squad for the 2015 AFC Asian Cup. However, during the team's first match against Oman, he sustained a hairline fracture of the right tibia and was unable to participate in the remainder of the tournament. Lee was included in South Korea's preliminary squad for the 2018 World Cup but did not make the final selection.

== Personal life ==
Lee married his middle-school girlfriend at Hotel Shilla in Seoul on 12 July 2014.

Lee has said he shuns alcohol and smoking, and even refrains from drinking coffee. Upon arriving in England, he reportedly spent two to three hours a day studying English and attended English classes to improve his speaking ability.

== Career statistics ==
=== Club ===
As of match played 9 December 2025

Appearances and goals by club, season and competition
Club	Season	League			Cup (Note: Includes Korean FA Cup, FA Cup, DFB-Pokal)		League Cup (Note: Includes Korean League Cup, EFL Cup)		Continental		Other		Total	
Club	Season	Division	Apps	Goals	Apps	Goals	Apps	Goals	Apps	Goals	Apps	Goals	Apps	Goals
FC Seoul	2006	K League	2	0	0	0	2	0	—		—		4	0
FC Seoul	2007	K League	15	3	2	0	8	0	—		—		25	3
FC Seoul	2008	K League	20	5	1	0	3	1	—		2 (Note: Appearances in K League Championship)	0	26	6
FC Seoul	2009	K League	15	3	2	0	1	0	5 (Note: Appearances in AFC Champions League)	0	—		23	3
FC Seoul	Total		52	11	5	0	14	1	5	0	2	0	78	12
Bolton Wanderers	2009–10	Premier League	34	4	4	1	2	0	—		—		40	5
Bolton Wanderers	2010–11	Premier League	31	3	4	1	1	0	—		—		36	4
Bolton Wanderers	2011–12	Premier League	2	0	0	0	0	0	—		—		2	0
Bolton Wanderers	2012–13	Championship	41	4	3	1	0	0	—		—		44	5
Bolton Wanderers	2013–14	Championship	45	3	2	0	0	0	—		—		47	3
Bolton Wanderers	2014–15	Championship	23	3	0	0	3	0	—		—		26	3
Bolton Wanderers	Total		176	17	13	3	6	0	—		—		195	20
Crystal Palace	2014–15	Premier League	3	0	0	0	0	0	—		—		3	0
Crystal Palace	2015–16	Premier League	13	1	1	0	3	1	—		—		17	2
Crystal Palace	2016–17	Premier League	15	0	3	0	2	0	—		—		20	0
Crystal Palace	2017–18	Premier League	7	0	0	0	3	0	—		—		10	0
Crystal Palace	Total		38	1	4	0	8	1	—		—		50	2
VfL Bochum	2018–19	2. Bundesliga	23	1	0	0	—		—		—		23	1
VfL Bochum	2019–20	2. Bundesliga	12	0	2	0	—		—		—		14	0
VfL Bochum	Total		35	1	2	0	—		—		—		37	1
Ulsan HD	2020	K League 1	20	4	4	1	—		8	0	—		32	5
Ulsan HD	2021	K League 1	25	3	2	0	—		7	0	—		34	3
Ulsan HD	2022	K League 1	35	3	3	0	—		5	0	—		43	3
Ulsan HD	2023	K League 1	34	1	1	0	—		4	0	—		39	1
Ulsan HD	2024	K League 1	23	1	4	1	—		7	0	—		34	2
Ulsan HD	2025	K League 1	24	4	1	0	—		4	0	3 (Note: Appearances in FIFA Club World Cup)	0	32	4
Ulsan HD	Total		161	16	15	2	—		35	0	3	0	214	18
Career total			462	46	39	5	28	2	40	0	5	0	574	53

=== International ===
Results list South Korea's goal tally first..

No.	Date	Venue	Opponent	Score	Result	Competition
1	5 September 2008	Seoul, South Korea	Jordan	1–0	1–0	Friendly
2	14 November 2008	Doha, Qatar	Qatar	1–0	1–1	Friendly
3	16 May 2010	Seoul, South Korea	Ecuador	2–0	2–0	Friendly
4	17 June 2010	Johannesburg, South Africa	Argentina	1–2	1–4	2010 FIFA World Cup
5	26 June 2010	Port Elizabeth, South Africa	Uruguay	1–1	1–2	2010 FIFA World Cup
6	15 November 2013	Seoul, South Korea	Switzerland	2–1	2–1	Friendly
7	3 September 2015	Hwaseong, South Korea	Laos	1–0	8–0	2018 FIFA World Cup qualification
8	1 September 2016	Seoul, South Korea	China	2–0	3–2	2018 FIFA World Cup qualification
9	22 March 2019	Ulsan, South Korea	Bolivia	1–0	1–0	Friendly

== Honours ==
FC Seoul

- Korean League Cup: 2006

Crystal Palace

- FA Cup runner-up: 2015–16

Ulsan HD

- AFC Champions League: 2020
- K League 1: 2022, 2023, 2024
- Korea Cup runner-up: 2020, 2024

South Korea U20

- AFC Youth Championship third place: 2006

South Korea

- AFC Asian Cup runner-up: 2015

Individual

- Korean League Cup top assist provider: 2007
- K League 1 Best XI: 2008, 2022
- Bolton Wanderers Player of the Year: 2009–10
- Northwest Football Award for Premier League Player of the Year: 2010
- Korean FA Fans' Player of the Year: 2013
- K League Goal of the Month: August 2021
- K League 1 Most Valuable Player: 2022
