= Gustavo (footballer, born 1994) =

Brazilian footballer

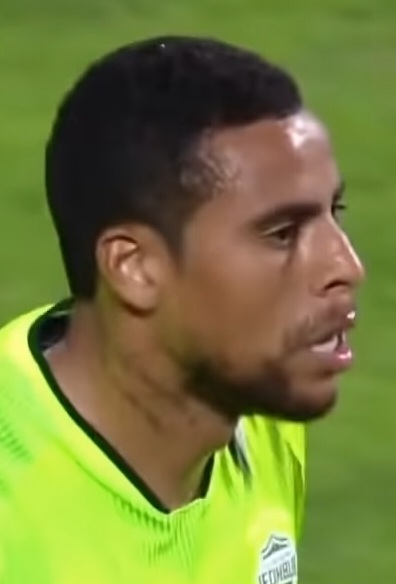

Personal information
- Full name: Gustavo Henrique da Silva Sousa
- Date of birth: 29 March 1994 (age 32)
- Place of birth: Registro, Brazil
- Height: 1.88 m (6 ft 2 in)
- Position: Striker

Team information
- Current team: Henan FC
- Number: 9

Youth career
- 2013–2014: Taboão da Serra
- 2014: Criciúma

Senior career*
Years	Team	Apps	(Gls)
2014–2016	Criciúma	28	(11)
2015	→ Resende (loan)	6	(2)
2015	→ Nacional (loan)	13	(0)
2016–2020	Corinthians	30	(5)
2017	→ Bahia (loan)	5	(1)
2017	→ Goiás (loan)	12	(1)
2018	→ Fortaleza (loan)	28	(14)
2020	→ Internacional (loan)	0	(0)
2020–2023	Jeonbuk Hyundai Motors	112	(34)
2024–2025	Shanghai Port	41	(27)
2026–	Henan FC	28	(15)
- * Club domestic league appearances and goals as of 24 October 2026

Gustavo Henrique da Silva Sousa (born 29 March 1994), known as Gustavo, is a Brazilian footballer who plays as a striker for Henan FC.

== Early life ==
Gustavo was born in Registro. He spent time at Taboão da Serra and Criciúma before starting his career with the latter.

== Club career ==
=== Criciúma ===
Born in Registro, São Paulo, Gustavo joined Taboão da Serra's youth setup in 2013. On 29 January 2014, after being one of the top goalscorers of the year's Copa São Paulo de Futebol Júnior, he signed for Criciúma.

Gustavo made his senior debut on 16 February 2014, coming on as a second-half substitute for Ricardinho in a 2–1 Campeonato Catarinense home win against Chapecoense. His Série A debut came on 9 August, starting in a 0–0 home draw against Cruzeiro.

On 4 March 2015, after being rarely used, Gustavo was loaned to Resende, for three months. On 13 August he joined Primeira Liga club Nacional, on loan for one year.

Returning to Tigre in 2016, Gustavo became a starter and scored six goals during the season's Catarinense, with two braces against Camboriú and Chapecoense. In Série B, he made his debut by scoring the game's only in a home success over Náutico, and scored a further ten goals before being transferred.

=== Corinthians ===
On 23 August 2016, Gustavo moved to Corinthians, who bought 35% of the player's federative rights (Criciúma only owned 70%). He was presented on 3 September, and made his debut for the club five days later by replacing Cristian in a 3–0 home win against Sport.

=== Jeonbuk Hyundai Motors ===
On 22 July 2020, Gustavo joined K League 1 club Jeonbuk Hyundai Motors on a deal running until December 2023.

=== Shanghai Port ===
On 12 February 2024, Gustavo joined Chinese Super League club Shanghai Port. On 17 January 2026, Gustavo announced his departure after the 2025 season.

=== Henan FC ===
On 21 February 2026, Gustavo joined Chinese Super League club Henan FC.

== Career statistics ==
As of match played 24 October 2026

Appearances and goals by club, season and competition
Club	Season	League			State league (Note: Includes Campeonato Catarinense, Campeonato Carioca, Campeonato Paulista, Campeonato Baiano, Campeonato Cearense, Campeonato Gaúcho)		National cup (Note: Includes Copa do Brasil, Taça de Portugal, Korean FA Cup, Chinese FA Cup)		Continental		Other		Total	
Club	Season	Division	Apps	Goals	Apps	Goals	Apps	Goals	Apps	Goals	Apps	Goals	Apps	Goals
Criciúma	2014	Série A	7	0	8	0	2	0	—		—		17	0
Criciúma	2015	Série B	3	0	0	0	—		—		—		3	0
Criciúma	2016	Série B	18	11	11	6	2	1	—		1 (Note: Appearance(s) in Primeira Liga)	0	32	18
Criciúma	Total		28	11	19	6	4	1	—		1	0	52	18
Resende (loan)	2015	Carioca	—		6	2	—		—		—		6	2
Nacional (loan)	2015–16	Primeira Liga	13	0	—		3	0	—		2 (Note: Appearances in Taça da Liga)	0	18	0
Corinthians	2016	Série A	4	0	—		—		—		—		4	0
Corinthians	2019	Série A	26	5	15	4	4	3	8 (Note: Appearances in Copa Sudamericana)	2	—		54	15
Corinthians	2020	Série A	—		2	0	—		1 (Note: Appearance in Copa Libertadores)	0	—		3	0
Corinthians	Total		30	5	17	4	4	3	9	2	—		61	15
Bahia (loan)	2017	Série A	5	1	14	5	1	0	—		4 (Note: Appearances in Copa do Nordeste)	0	24	6
Goiás (loan)	2017	Série B	12	1	—		—		—		—		12	1
Fortaleza (loan)	2018	Série B	28	14	17	16	—		—		—		45	30
Internacional (loan)	2020	Série A	—		2	0	—		1	0	—		3	0
Jeonbuk Hyundai Motors	2020	K League 1	14	5	—		4	4	3 (Note: Appearances in AFC Champions League)	2	—		21	11
Jeonbuk Hyundai Motors	2021	K League 1	34	15	—		1	0	8	8	—		43	23
Jeonbuk Hyundai Motors	2022	K League 1	34	8	—		2	2	7	2	—		43	12
Jeonbuk Hyundai Motors	2023	K League 1	30	6	—		2	5	3	0	—		35	11
Jeonbuk Hyundai Motors	Total		112	34	—		9	11	21	12	—		142	57
Shanghai Port	2024	Chinese Super League	28	20	—		3	0	6	1	0	0	37	21
Shanghai Port	2025	Chinese Super League	13	7	—		2	3	4	0	1 (Note: Appearance in Chinese Super Cup)	0	20	10
Shanghai Port	Total		41	27	—		5	3	10	1	1	0	57	31
Henan FC	2026	Chinese Super League	28	15	—		1	0	—		—		29	15
Career total			297	108	75	33	27	18	41	14	8	0	448	173

== Honours ==
Bahia

- Copa do Nordeste: 2017

Fortaleza

- Campeonato Brasileiro Série B: 2018

Corinthians

- Campeonato Paulista: 2019

Jeonbuk Hyundai Motors

- K League 1: 2020, 2021
- KFA Cup: 2020, 2022

Shanghai Port

- Chinese Super League: 2024, 2025
- Chinese FA Cup: 2024

Individual

- Campeonato Paulista Team of the Year: 2019
- KFA Cup Top Scorer: 2020
