= 2020 Korean FA Cup =

2020 Hana Bank FA Cup

Tournament details
- Country: South Korea
- Dates: 9 May – 8 November 2020
- Teams: 60

Final positions
- Champions: Jeonbuk Hyundai Motors (4th title)
- Runners-up: Ulsan Hyundai
- Champions League: Jeonbuk Hyundai Motors

Tournament statistics
- Matches played: 44
- Goals scored: 156 (3.55 per match)
- Top goal scorer: Gustavo (4 goals)

Awards
- Best player: Lee Seung-gi

The 2020 Korean FA Cup, known as the 2020 Hana Bank FA Cup due to sponsorship agreement with Hana Bank, was the 25th edition of the Korean FA Cup. University clubs, including U-League teams, could not enter the competition since this year, and were replaced by K5 League teams.

The draw was held on 18 February 2020.

Jeonbuk Hyundai Motors won their fourth FA Cup title, and qualified for the 2021 AFC Champions League group stage.

== Schedule ==
Round	Date	Matches	Clubs remaining	Clubs involved	New entries this round
First round	9 May	16	60	32	10 K3 League teams 11 K4 League teams 11 K5 League teams
Second round	6 June	16	44	16+16	10 K League 2 teams 6 K3 League teams
Third round	1 July	12	28	16+8	8 K League 1 teams
Round of 16	15 July	8	16	12+4	4 Champions League teams
Quarter-finals	29 July	4	8	8	None
Semi-finals	23 September	2	4	4	None
Final	4–8 November	2	2	2	None

== Bracket ==
Round of 16 (Fourth round)
Ulsan Hyundai	2
Gyeongju KHNP	0
Gangwon FC	4
Gwangju FC	2
Pohang Steelers (a.e.t.)	3
Sangju Sangmu	2
FC Seoul (p)	1 (4)
Daejeon Hana Citizen	1 (2)
Jeonbuk Hyundai Motors (a.e.t.)	3
Jeonnam Dragons	2
Busan IPark	1
Suwon FC	0
Seongnam FC (p)	1 (4)
Daegu FC	1 (2)
Suwon Samsung Bluewings (a.e.t.)	1
Jeju United	0

Quarter-finals (Fifth round)
Ulsan Hyundai	3
Gangwon FC	0
Pohang Steelers	5
FC Seoul	1
Jeonbuk Hyundai Motors	5
Busan IPark	1
Seongnam FC	1
Suwon Samsung Bluewings	0

Semi-finals (Sixth round)
Ulsan Hyundai (p)	1 (4)
Pohang Steelers	1 (3)
Jeonbuk Hyundai Motors	1
Seongnam FC	0

Final (Seventh round)
Ulsan Hyundai	1	1	2
Jeonbuk Hyundai Motors	1	2	3

== First round ==
9 May 2020	Chuncheon FC (3)	4–0	Byuksan Players (5)	Chuncheon Songam Leports Town, Chuncheon
14:00 UTC+9

9 May 2020	Winner Star (5)	0–2	Siheung Citizen (4)	Daejeon Hanbat Sports Complex, Daejeon
14:00 UTC+9

9 May 2020	Ulsan Citizen (4)	5–1	Gimhae Jaemics (5)	Ulsan Stadium, Ulsan
14:00 UTC+9

9 May 2020	Pyeongtaek Citizen (3)	5–0	Deokkye FC (5)	Yichung Leports Stadium 2, Pyeongtaek
14:00 UTC+9

9 May 2020	Gimhae FC (3)	1–0 (a.e.t.)	Busan Transportation Corporation (3)	Gimhae Stadium, Gimhae
14:00 UTC+9

9 May 2020	SMC Engineering (5)	3–1	Haneul FC (5)	Cheongju Stadium, Cheongju
14:00 UTC+9

9 May 2020	Hyochang FC (5)	5–2	East Ulsan (5)	Boramae Football Park, Gwangju
14:00 UTC+9

9 May 2020	Yeoju Citizen (4)	1–3	Daejeon Korail (3)	Yeoju Stadium, Yeoju
14:00 UTC+9

9 May 2020	Garam FC (5)	0–4	Songwol FC (5)	Imha Dam Stadium, Andong
14:00 UTC+9

9 May 2020	Pocheon Citizen (4)	1–3 (a.e.t.)	Changwon City (3)	Pocheon Stadium, Pocheon
14:00 UTC+9

9 May 2020	Goyang Citizen (4)	3–1	Seoul Jungnang (4)	Eoullimnuri Byeolmuri Stadium, Goyang
14:00 UTC+9

9 May 2020	Parangsae FC (5)	0–2	Jeonju Citizen (3)	Jeonju Stadium, Jeonju
14:00 UTC+9

9 May 2020	Seoul Nowon United (4)	3–4 (a.e.t.)	Chungju Citizen (4)	Nowon Madeul Stadium, Seoul
17:00 UTC+9

9 May 2020	Yangpyeong FC (4)	2–3	Mokpo City (3)	Yongmun Life Sports Park, Yangpyeong
14:00 UTC+9

9 May 2020	Paju Citizen (4)	3–0 (a.e.t.)	Yangju Citizen (3)	Paju Stadium, Paju
14:00 UTC+9

9 May 2020	Icheon Citizen (4)	0–1	Cheongju FC (3)	Icheon Stadium, Icheon
14:00 UTC+9

== Second round ==
6 June 2020	Daejeon Hana Citizen (2)	3–0	Chuncheon FC (3)	Daejeon World Cup Stadium, Daejeon
19:00 UTC+9	Park Yong-ji 27'; André Luís 57'; Kim Seung-Seob 79'			Attendance: 0

6 June 2020	Ansan Greeners (2)	3–0	Siheung Citizen (4)	Ansan Wa~ Stadium, Ansan
19:00 UTC+9				Attendance: 0

6 June 2020	Ulsan Citizen (4)	1–0	Bucheon FC 1995 (2)	Ulsan Stadium, Ulsan
19:00 UTC+9				Attendance: 0

6 June 2020	Gyeongju Citizen (3)	1–0 (a.e.t.)	Pyeongtaek Citizen (3)	Gyeongju Stadium, Gyeongju
13:00 UTC+9				Attendance: 0

6 June 2020	Gimhae FC (3)	4–2	Cheonan City (3)	Gimhae Stadium, Gimhae
19:00 UTC+9				Attendance: 0

6 June 2020	Gyeongju KHNP (3)	4–0	SMC Engineering (5)	Gyeongju Stadium, Gyeongju
17:00 UTC+9				Attendance: 0

6 June 2020	Suwon FC (2)	10–0	Hyochang FC (5)	Suwon Sports Complex, Suwon
19:00 UTC+9	Min Hyun-hong 15', 49'; Song Soo-young 29'; Szarka 45', 56', 68'; Kim Jae-heon 55', 58'; Choi Kyu-baek 78'; Kim Ju-yeop 84'			Attendance: 0

6 June 2020	Hwaseong FC (3)	3–2 (a.e.t.)	Daejeon Korail (3)	Hwaseong Sports Town 2, Hwaseong
16:00 UTC+9	Choi Chi-won 13', 41', 120+3' (pen.)		Ahn Sang-min 33'; Ban Chan-jun 89'	Attendance: 0

6 June 2020	Jeju United (2)	4–0	Songwol FC (5)	Jeju World Cup Stadium, Seogwipo
15:00 UTC+9	Seo Jin-su 34'; Kim Seung-woo 43'; Lee Chang-min 44', 57'			Attendance: 0

6 June 2020	Seoul E-Land (2)	1–0	Changwon City (3)	Seoul Sports Complex, Seoul
20:00 UTC+9				Attendance: 0

6 June 2020	FC Anyang (2)	2–0	Goyang Citizen (4)	Anyang Stadium, Anyang
15:00 UTC+9	Koo Bon-hyeok 53'; Nilson 75' (pen.)			Attendance: 0

6 June 2020	Chungnam Asan (2)	1–0	Jeonju Citizen (3)	Yi Sun-sin Stadium, Asan
19:00 UTC+9	Kim Won-seok 42'			Attendance: 0

6 June 2020	Jeonnam Dragons (2)	2–0	Chungju Citizen (4)	Gwangyang Football Stadium, Gwangyang
15:00 UTC+9				Attendance: 0

6 June 2020	Gyeongnam FC (2)	4–3	Mokpo City (3)	Changwon Football Center, Changwon
19:00 UTC+9				Attendance: 0

6 June 2020	Paju Citizen (4)	2–4 (a.e.t.)	Gimpo Citizen (3)	Hanbat Stadium, Daejeon
15:00 UTC+9				Attendance: 0

6 June 2020	Gangneung City (3)	2–1	Cheongju FC (3)	Gangneung Stadium, Gangneung
19:00 UTC+9				Attendance: 0

== Third round ==
1 July 2020	Daejeon Hana Citizen (2)	2–0	Ansan Greeners (2)	Daejeon World Cup Stadium, Daejeon
19:00 UTC+9	Park Jin-seob 57'; Yoon Sung-han 90+4'	Report		Attendance: 0

1 July 2020	Ulsan Citizen (4)	0–2	Sangju Sangmu (1)	Ulsan Stadium, Ulsan
19:00 UTC+9		Report	Park Dong-jin 34', 81'	Attendance: 0

1 July 2020	Pohang Steelers (1)	1–0	Gyeongju Citizen (3)	Pohang Steel Yard, Pohang
19:00 UTC+9	Lee Seung-mo 86'	Report		Attendance: 0

1 July 2020	Gimhae FC (3)	0–2	Gyeongju KHNP (3)	Gimhae Stadium, Gimhae
19:00 UTC+9		Report	Shin Yeong-jun 18'; Lee Seung-min 49'	Attendance: 0

1 July 2020	Suwon FC (2)	2–2 (a.e.t.) (5–4 p)	Incheon United (1)	Suwon Sports Complex, Suwon
19:00 UTC+9	Jeon Jeong-ho 7'; Kim Yeon-su 65' (o.g.)	Report	Lee Joon-suk 54'; Kang Sin-myeong 75' (o.g.)	Attendance: 0

1 July 2020	Busan IPark (1)	4–0	Hwaseong FC (3)	Busan Gudeok Stadium, Busan
19:00 UTC+9	Vintecinco 22'; Hwang Jun-ho 37'; Jeon Bo-hun 41' (o.g.); Kim Jin-kyu 77'	Report		Attendance: 0

1 July 2020	Jeju United (2)	3–2 (a.e.t.)	Seoul E-Land (2)	Jeju World Cup Stadium, Seogwipo
19:00 UTC+9	Lim Dong-hyuk 90+2'; Gong Min-hyun 90+4'; Jung Jo-gook 117'	Report	Kim Jin-hwan 19'; Won Ki-jong 72'	Attendance: 0

1 July 2020	FC Anyang (2)	0–2	Daegu FC (1)	Anyang Stadium, Anyang
19:00 UTC+9		Report	Kim Dae-won 30', 62'	Attendance: 0

1 July 2020	Seongnam FC (1)	1–0	Chungnam Asan (2)	Tancheon Sports Complex, Seongnam
19:00 UTC+9	Kiš 31'	Report		Attendance: 0

1 July 2020	Jeonnam Dragons (2)	4–0	Gyeongnam FC (2)	Gwangyang Football Stadium, Gwangyang
19:00 UTC+9	Kim Hyeon-ug 48'; Kristoffersen 61' (pen.); Park Chan-yong 68'; Zoteev 81'	Report		Attendance: 0

1 July 2020	Gwangju FC (1)	2–2 (a.e.t.) (5–4 p)	Gimpo Citizen (3)	Gwangju World Cup Stadium, Gwangju
19:00 UTC+9	Im Min-hyeok 25'; Choi Jun-hyeok 110'	Report	Kim Dong-chan 83'; Lee Ki-je 118'	Attendance: 0

1 July 2020	Gangwon FC (1)	2–1 (a.e.t.)	Gangneung City (3)	Gangneung Stadium, Gangneung
19:00 UTC+9	Lee Yeong-jae 89'; Seo Min-woo 120+2'	Report	Kim Dong-seob 8'	Attendance: 0

== Round of 16 ==
15 July 2020	Daejeon Hana Citizen (2)	1–1 (a.e.t.) (2–4 p)	FC Seoul (1)	Daejeon World Cup Stadium, Daejeon
19:00	Baio 5'	Report	Park Chu-young 83'

15 July 2020	Sangju Sangmu (1)	2–3 (a.e.t.)	Pohang Steelers (1)	Sangju Civic Stadium, Sangju
19:00	Jeong Jae-hee 31'; Heo Yong-jun 59' (pen.)	Report	Iljutcenko 17', 119'; Choi Young-jun 65'

15 July 2020	Ulsan Hyundai (1)	2–0	Gyeongju KHNP (3)	Ulsan Munsu Football Stadium, Ulsan
19:00	Johnsen 75'; Lee Dong-gyeong 90+3'	Report

15 July 2020	Suwon FC (2)	0–1	Busan IPark (1)	Suwon Sports Complex, Suwon
19:00		Report	Park Jong-woo 76'

15 July 2020	Jeju United (2)	0–1 (a.e.t.)	Suwon Samsung Bluewings (1)	Jeju World Cup Stadium, Seogwipo
19:00		Report	Taggart 99'

15 July 2020	Daegu FC (1)	1–1 (a.e.t.) (2–4 p)	Seongnam FC (1)	DGB Daegu Bank Park, Daegu
19:00	Cesinha 45'	Report	Lee Chang-yong 77'
	Penalties
	Dejan (penalty scored); Sin Chang-moo (penalty missed); Nishi (penalty scored); Kim Dae-won (penalty missed)		Yang Dong-hyen (penalty scored); Kiš (penalty scored); Kim Dong-hyun (penalty scored); Yu In-soo (penalty scored)

15 July 2020	Jeonbuk Hyundai Motors (1)	3–2 (a.e.t.)	Jeonnam Dragons (2)	Jeonju World Cup Stadium, Jeonju
19:00	Lee Seung-gi 17'; Son Jun-ho 96'; Kunimoto 100'	Report	Lee Jong-ho 89'; Ha Seung-un 102'

15 July 2020	Gwangju FC (1)	2–4	Gangwon FC (1)	Gwangju World Cup Stadium, Gwangju
19:00	Kim Hyo-gi 55'; Han Hee-hoon 73'	Report	Jung Seok-hwa 23'; Lee Hyeon-sik 24'; Lee Yeong-jae 44', 76'

== Quarter-finals ==
29 July 2020	Busan IPark (1)	1–5	Jeonbuk Hyundai Motors (1)	Busan Gudeok Stadium, Busan
19:00	Gustavo Vintecinco 4'	Report	Cho Gue-sung 28'; Han Kyo-won 47'; Gustavo 72', 77', 81'	Attendance: 0

29 July 2020	Seongnam FC (1)	1–0	Suwon Samsung Bluewings (1)	Tancheon Sports Complex, Seongnam
19:00	Kiš 73'	Report		Attendance: 0

29 July 2020	Ulsan Hyundai (1)	3–0	Gangwon FC (1)	Ulsan Munsu Football Stadium, Ulsan
19:30	Yoon Bit-garam 52', 55'; Lee Chung-yong 84'	Report		Attendance: 0

29 July 2020	FC Seoul (1)	1–5	Pohang Steelers (1)	Seoul World Cup Stadium, Seoul
19:30	Jung Hyun-cheol 32'	Report	Song Min-kyu 13'; Kim Gwang-seok 32'; Iljutcenko 83'; Shim Dong-woon 90', 90+1'	Attendance: 0

== Semi-finals ==
23 September 2020	Jeonbuk Hyundai Motors (1)	1–0	Seongnam FC (1)	Jeonju World Cup Stadium, Jeonju
19:00	Gustavo 11'			Attendance: 0

23 September 2020	Ulsan Hyundai (1)	1–1 (a.e.t.) (4–3 p)	Pohang Steelers (1)	Ulsan Munsu Football Stadium, Ulsan
19:30	Kim In-sung 52'		Kim Tae-hwan 12' (o.g.)	Attendance: 0
	Penalties
	Johnsen (penalty scored); Won Du-jae (penalty scored); Kim In-sung (penalty missed); Yoon Bit-Garam (penalty scored); Júnior (penalty missed); Jung Seung-hyun (penalty missed); Lee Dong-gyeong (penalty missed); Hong Chul (penalty scored)		(penalty missed) Iljutcenko; (penalty scored) Sim Dong-Woon; (penalty scored) Kang Sang-woo; (penalty scored) Lee Seung-mo; (penalty missed) Paločević; (penalty missed) Kang Hyeon-mu; (penalty missed) Choi Young-jun; (penalty missed) Song Min-kyu

== Final ==
4 November 2020 First leg	Ulsan Hyundai (1)	1–1	Jeonbuk Hyundai Motors (1)	Ulsan Munsu Football Stadium, Ulsan
19:00 (UTC+9)	Júnior 60'		Murilo 50'	Referee: Dong-Joon Lee

8 November 2020 Second leg	Jeonbuk Hyundai Motors (1)	2–1 (3–2 agg.)	Ulsan Hyundai (1)	Jeonju World Cup Stadium, Jeonju
14:00 (UTC+9)	Lee Seung-gi 53', 71'		Júnior 4'	Referee: Jong Hyeok Kim

== See also ==
- 2020 in South Korean football
- 2020 K League 1
- 2020 K League 2
- 2020 K3 League
- 2020 K4 League
