= Yun Ji-hyeok =

South Korean footballer (born 1998)

Personal information
- Date of birth: 7 February 1998 (age 28)
- Place of birth: South Korea
- Height: 1.90 m (6 ft 3 in)
- Position: Defender

Senior career*
| Years | Team | Apps | (Gls) |
| 2018–2020 | Jeonbuk Hyundai Motors | 0 | (0) |
| 2019 | → Bucheon Fc (loan) | 1 | (0) |
| 2021- | Bucheon FC 1995 | 13 | (0) |
- * Club domestic league appearances and goals as of 8 October 2022

Yun Ji=hyeok (Korean: 윤지혁; born 7 February 1998 in South Korea) is a South Korean footballer who now plays for Bucheon FC 1995 in his home country.

== Career ==
Yun started his senior career with Jeonbuk Hyundai Motors in the K League 1, where he made one appearance and scored zero goals. After that, he played for Bucheon 1995.
