= 2020 K League 1 =

38th season of the top division of professional football in South Korea

Hana 1Q K League 1
- Season: 2020
- Dates: 8 May – 1 November 2020
- Champions: Jeonbuk Hyundai Motors (8th title)
- Relegated: Sangju Sangmu; Busan IPark
- Champions League: Jeonbuk Hyundai Motors; Ulsan Hyundai; Pohang Steelers; Daegu FC
- Matches: 162
- Goals: 425 (2.62 per match)
- Best Player: Son Jun-ho
- Top goalscorer: Júnior Negrão (26 goals)
- Biggest home win: Daegu 6–0 Seoul (14 June 2020)
- Biggest away win: Seongnam 0–6 Incheon (27 September 2020)
- Highest scoring: Daegu 4–6 Gwangju (30 August 2020)
- Longest winning run: 5 matches Jeonbuk Hyundai Motors; Ulsan Hyundai
- Longest unbeaten run: 11 matches Ulsan Hyundai
- Longest winless run: 15 matches Incheon United
- Longest losing run: 8 matches Incheon United

The 2020 K League 1 was the 38th season of the top division of professional football in South Korea, and the eighth season of the K League 1. Jeonbuk Hyundai Motors won their eighth title, becoming the most successful K League club which had the most titles.

The regular season was scheduled to begin on 29 February and to end on 4 October, but was postponed until 8 May due to the COVID-19 pandemic.

On 24 April 2020, the K League Federation confirmed that they would adopt a modified plan for the season, reducing the number of matchdays to 27 including five matchdays of each divided final league.

Sangju Sangmu and the lowest-placed team at the end of the season were relegated to the K League 2 for the 2021 season.

In this season, one additional spot for players from ASEAN countries was added regardless of the "3+1" foreign players rule.

== Teams ==
=== Team changes ===
Relegated to K League 2

- Gyeongnam FC
- Jeju United

Promoted from K League 2

- Gwangju FC
- Busan IPark

=== Locations ===
Locations of the 2020 K League 1 teams

The following twelve teams competed in the 2020 K League 1.

Team	City/Province
Busan IPark	Busan
Daegu FC	Daegu
Gangwon FC	Gangwon
Gwangju FC	Gwangju
Incheon United	Incheon
Jeonbuk Hyundai Motors	Jeonbuk
Pohang Steelers	Pohang
Sangju Sangmu	Sangju
Seongnam FC	Seongnam
FC Seoul	Seoul
Suwon Samsung Bluewings	Suwon
Ulsan Hyundai	Ulsan

=== Stadiums ===
Busan IPark	Daegu FC	Incheon United
Busan Gudeok Stadium	DGB Daegu Bank Park	Incheon Football Stadium
Capacity: **12,349**	Capacity: **12,415**	Capacity: **20,891**
Pohang Steelers	Sangju Sangmu	Seongnam FC
Pohang Steel Yard	Sangju Civic Stadium	Tancheon Stadium
Capacity: **17,443**	Capacity: **15,042**	Capacity: **16,146**
FC Seoul	Suwon Samsung Bluewings	Ulsan Hyundai
Seoul World Cup Stadium	Suwon World Cup Stadium	Ulsan Munsu Football Stadium
Capacity: **66,704**	Capacity: **44,031**	Capacity: **44,102**
Gwangju FC		Jeonbuk Hyundai Motors
Gwangju World Cup Stadium	Gwangju Football Stadium	Jeonju World Cup Stadium
Capacity: **40,245**	Capacity: **12,000**	Capacity: **42,477**
Gangwon FC		
Chuncheon Songam Leports Town	Gangneung Stadium	
Capacity: **20,000**	Capacity: **22,333**	

=== Personnel and sponsoring ===
Team	Manager	Main sponsor	Kit manufacturer	Other sponsor(s)
Busan IPark	(South Korea) Lee Ki-hyung (caretaker)	Hyundai Development Company	Adidas	
Daegu FC	(South Korea) Lee Byung-keun (caretaker)	Daegu Government	Forward	DGB Daegu Bank; AJIN Industrial Co., Ltd.
Gangwon FC	(South Korea) Kim Byung-soo	Gangwon Provincial Government	Applerind	Kangwon Land
Gwangju FC	(South Korea) Park Jin-sub	Gwangju Government	Kelme	
Incheon United	(South Korea) Jo Sung-hwan	Incheon Government	Macron	Shinhan Bank; Incheon International Airport
Jeonbuk Hyundai Motors	(Portugal) José Morais	Hyundai Motor Company	Hummel	
Pohang Steelers	(South Korea) Kim Gi-dong	POSCO	Astore	Pohang Government
Sangju Sangmu	(South Korea) Kim Tae-wan	Korea Armed Forces Athletic Corps	Kelme	
Seongnam FC	(South Korea) Kim Nam-il	Seongnam Government	Umbro	
FC Seoul	(South Korea) Park Hyuk-soon (caretaker)	GS Group	Le Coq Sportif	
Suwon Samsung Bluewings	(South Korea) Park Kun-ha	Cheil Worldwide	Puma	Samsung Electronics
Ulsan Hyundai	(South Korea) Kim Do-hoon	Hyundai Heavy Industries	Hummel	Hyundai Oil Bank

=== Foreign players ===
Restricting the number of foreign players strictly to five per team, including a slot for a player from the Asian Football Confederation countries and a slot for a player from the Association of Southeast Asian Nations. A team could use five foreign players on the field each game, including at least one player from the AFC confederation.

Players in bold were registered during the mid-season transfer window.

Team	Player 1	Player 2	Player 3	AFC player	ASEAN player (Note: Did not exist in the regulation of AFC.)	Former player(s)
Busan IPark	(Brazil) Vintecinco	(Brazil) Rômulo		(Uzbekistan) Dostonbek Tursunov		(Brazil) Reis
Daegu FC	(Brazil) Césinha	(Brazil) Edgar	(Montenegro) Dejan Damjanović	(Japan) Tsubasa Nishi		
Gangwon FC				(Japan) Takahiro Nakazato		
Gwangju FC	(Brazil) Felipe	(Brazil) Willyan	(Costa Rica) Marco Ureña	(Uzbekistan) Rustam Ashurmatov		
Incheon United	(Montenegro) Stefan Mugoša	(Costa Rica) **Elías Aguilar**	(Brazil) **Gustavo**	(Australia) Rashid Mahazi		(Nigeria) Lanre Kehinde (Bosnia and Herzegovina) Gordan Bunoza
Jeonbuk Hyundai Motors	(Brazil) Murilo	(The Gambia) **Modou Barrow**	(Brazil) **Gustavo**	(Japan) Takahiro Kunimoto		(South Africa) Lars Veldwijk
Pohang Steelers	(Colombia) Manuel Palacios	(Russia) Stanislav Iljutcenko	(Serbia) Aleksandar Paločević			(Australia) Brandon O’Neill
Seongnam FC	(Croatia) Igor Jovanović	(Croatia) Tomislav Kiš		(Uzbekistan) Jamshid Iskanderov		
FC Seoul	(Brazil) Adriano Michael Jackson	(Spain) Osmar		(Uzbekistan) Ikromjon Alibaev		(Serbia) Aleksandar Pešić
Suwon Samsung Bluewings	(Canada) Doneil Henry	(Australia) Terry Antonis		(Australia) Adam Taggart		(Bosnia and Herzegovina) Sulejman Krpić
Ulsan Hyundai	(Brazil) Júnior Negrão	(Netherlands) Dave Bulthuis	(Norway) Bjørn Maars Johnsen	(Australia) Jason Davidson		

== League table ==
Pos	Team	Pld	W	D	L	GF	GA	GD	Pts	Qualification or relegation (Note: Teams are split into two groups (Final A and Final B) after each have played 22 matches.)
1	Jeonbuk Hyundai Motors (C)	27	19	3	5	46	21	+25	60	Qualification for Champions League group stage
2	Ulsan Hyundai	27	17	6	4	54	23	+31	57	Qualification for Champions League group stage
3	Pohang Steelers	27	15	5	7	56	35	+21	50	Qualification for Champions League group stage
4	Sangju Sangmu (Note: Sangju Sangmu were a military team and were not eligible to represent South Korea in the AFC club competitions. Additionally, they were relegated to K League 2 regardless of their final position by moving their stronghold the next season.) (R)	27	13	5	9	34	36	−2	44	Relegation to K League 2
5	Daegu FC	27	10	8	9	43	39	+4	38	Qualification for Champions League group stage
6	Gwangju FC	27	6	7	14	32	46	−14	25	
7	Gangwon FC	27	9	7	11	36	41	−5	34	
8	Suwon Samsung Bluewings	27	8	7	12	27	30	−3	31	
9	FC Seoul	27	8	5	14	23	44	−21	29	
10	Seongnam FC	27	7	7	13	24	37	−13	28	
11	Incheon United	27	7	6	14	25	35	−10	27	
12	Busan IPark (R)	27	5	10	12	25	38	−13	25	Relegation to K League 2

Source: K League
Rules for classification: 1) Points; 2) Goals scored; 3) Goal difference; 4) Wins; 5) Head-to-head points
(C) Champions; (R) Relegated

== Positions by matchday ==
Leaders
Qualification for Champions League group stage
Relegation to K League 2

=== Round 1–22 ===
Team ╲ Round	1	2	3	4	5	6	7	8	9	10	11	12	13	14	15	16	17	18	19	20	21	22
Jeonbuk Hyundai Motors	5	2	1	1	1	1	1	1	1	1	2	2	2	2	2	2	2	2	2	2	2	2
Ulsan Hyundai	1	1	2	2	2	2	2	2	2	2	1	1	1	1	1	1	1	1	1	1	1	1
Pohang Steelers	3	3	6	4	6	4	5	5	5	5	4	4	3	5	4	4	5	4	4	4	4	3
Sangju Sangmu	12	7	4	6	5	6	4	3	3	3	3	3	4	4	3	3	3	3	3	3	3	4
Daegu FC	6	8	8	9	8	5	6	4	4	4	5	5	5	3	5	5	4	5	5	5	5	5
Gwangju FC	11	12	12	12	10	8	7	7	7	8	9	10	10	8	10	10	10	7	7	7	8	6
Gangwon FC	2	5	7	5	3	3	3	6	6	7	6	6	6	6	7	8	8	6	6	9	6	8
Suwon Samsung Bluewings	9	10	10	8	9	10	8	8	10	10	8	9	9	10	11	11	11	11	11	11	11	11
FC Seoul	8	6	3	7	7	9	10	11	9	9	10	11	11	11	8	6	6	8	9	6	7	7
Seongnam FC	4	4	5	3	4	7	9	9	8	11	11	8	8	9	6	7	9	10	8	8	9	9
Incheon United	7	9	9	11	12	12	12	12	12	12	12	12	12	12	12	12	12	12	12	12	12	12
Busan IPark	10	11	11	10	11	11	11	10	11	6	7	7	7	7	9	9	7	9	10	10	10	10

Source: K League

=== Round 23–27 ===
The league was divided into two groups, the top six and the bottom six, after the 22nd matchday.

Team ╲ Round	23	24	25	26	27
Jeonbuk Hyundai Motors	2	2	2	1	1
Ulsan Hyundai	1	1	1	2	2
Pohang Steelers	3	3	3	3	3
Sangju Sangmu	4	4	4	4	4
Daegu FC	5	5	5	5	5
Gwangju FC	6	6	6	6	6
Gangwon FC	7	7	7	7	7
Suwon Samsung Bluewings	9	8	8	9	8
FC Seoul	8	9	9	8	9
Seongnam FC	10	11	11	11	10
Incheon United	11	12	12	12	11
Busan IPark	12	10	10	10	12

Source: K League

== Results ==
=== Matches 1–22 ===
Home \ Away	BSI	DGU	GWN	GJU	ICU	JHM	PHS	SJS	SFC	SEO	SSB	USH
Busan IPark	—	2–2	1–2	0–0	0–0	1–2	2–1	1–1	1–1	2–0	0–0	1–2
Daegu FC	3–0	—	2–1	4–6	0–1	0–2	1–1	1–1	3–2	6–0	3–1	1–3
Gangwon FC	2–4	0–0	—	4–1	2–3	1–0	0–3	2–2	1–1	3–1	1–2	0–3
Gwangju FC	3–1	2–4	2–2	—	2–1	3–3	0–2	0–1	0–2	0–0	0–1	1–1
Incheon United	0–1	0–0	1–2	1–3	—	1–1	1–4	1–1	0–2	1–0	1–0	0–1
Jeonbuk Hyundai Motors	2–0	2–0	1–2	1–0	1–0	—	2–1	2–1	2–2	3–0	1–0	2–1
Pohang Steelers	2–0	3–2	2–0	1–1	1–1	1–2	—	4–3	2–1	1–2	1–1	0–4
Sangju Sangmu	2–0	2–0	2–0	1–0	3–1	1–0	2–4	—	0–0	1–0	1–0	1–5
Seongnam FC	1–1	1–2	0–0	0–2	0–0	2–0	0–4	0–1	—	1–2	0–2	1–2
FC Seoul	1–1	0–0	2–0	1–0	1–0	1–4	1–3	2–1	0–1	—	2–1	0–2
Suwon Samsung Bluewings	3–1	0–1	2–2	0–1	1–0	1–3	0–0	0–1	0–1	3–3	—	2–3
Ulsan Hyundai	1–1	1–1	1–0	1–1	4–1	0–2	2–0	4–0	1–0	3–0	0–0	—

Source: K League
Legend: Blue = home team win; Yellow = draw; Red = away team win.

=== Matches 23–27 ===
==== Final A ====
Home \ Away	DGU	GJU	JHM	PHS	SJS	USH
Daegu FC	—	—	—	3–2	—	2–2
Gwangju FC	0–1	—	—	—	0–1	—
Jeonbuk Hyundai Motors	2–0	4–1	—	0–1	—	—
Pohang Steelers	—	5–3	—	—	3–1	4–0
Sangju Sangmu	2–1	—	0–1	—	—	—
Ulsan Hyundai	—	3–0	0–1	—	4–1	—

Source: K League
Legend: Blue = home team win; Yellow = draw; Red = away team win.

==== Final B ====
Home \ Away	BSI	GWN	ICU	SFC	SEO	SSB
Busan IPark	—	0–2	—	—	—	0–0
Gangwon FC	—	—	3–1	2–1	—	1–2
Incheon United	2–1	—	—	—	—	0–1
Seongnam FC	2–1	—	0–6	—	0–1	—
FC Seoul	1–2	1–1	0–1	—	—	—
Suwon Samsung Bluewings	—	—	—	1–2	3–1	—

Source: K League
Legend: Blue = home team win; Yellow = draw; Red = away team win.

== Statistics ==
=== Top goalscorers ===
Rank	Player	Club	Goals
1	(Brazil) Júnior Negrão	Ulsan Hyundai	26
2	(Russia) Stanislav Iljutcenko	Pohang Steelers	19
3	(Brazil) Cesinha	Daegu FC	18
4	(Serbia) Aleksandar Paločević	Pohang Steelers	14
5	(Montenegro) Stefan Mugoša	Incheon United	12
5	(Brazil) Felipe	Gwangju FC	12
7	(South Korea) Han Kyo-won	Jeonbuk Hyundai Motors	11
8	(South Korea) Song Min-kyu	Pohang Steelers	10
9	(Montenegro) Dejan Damjanović	Daegu FC	9
9	(Australia) Adam Taggart	Suwon Samsung Bluewings	9
9	(South Korea) Ko Moo-yeol	Gangwon FC	9

=== Top assist providers ===
Rank	Player	Club	Assists
1	(South Korea) Kang Sang-woo	Sangju Sangmu; Pohang Steelers	12
2	(South Korea) Jeong Seung-won	Daegu FC	7
3	(South Korea) Kim Seung-dae	Gangwon FC	6
3	(Serbia) Aleksandar Paločević	Pohang Steelers	6
3	(South Korea) Kim In-sung	Ulsan Hyundai	6
3	(Colombia) Manuel Palacios	Pohang Steelers	6
3	(Russia) Stanislav Iljutcenko	Pohang Steelers	6
3	(South Korea) Song Min-kyu	Pohang Steelers	6
9	(South Korea) Son Jun-ho	Jeonbuk Hyundai Motors	5
10	12 players		4

== Awards ==
=== Weekly awards ===
Round	Player of the Round	
Round	Player	Club
1	(Brazil) Júnior Negrão	Ulsan Hyundai
2	(Brazil) Júnior Negrão	Ulsan Hyundai
3	(South Korea) Kang Sang-woo	Sangju Sangmu
4	(Russia) Stanislav Iljutcenko	Pohang Steelers
5	(South Korea) Lee Chung-yong	Ulsan Hyundai
6	(Russia) Stanislav Iljutcenko	Pohang Steelers
7	(South Korea) Kim Min-hyeok	Jeonbuk Hyundai Motors
8	(Brazil) Cesinha	Daegu FC
9	(Japan) Takahiro Kunimoto	Jeonbuk Hyundai Motors
10	(South Korea) Lee Dong-jun	Busan IPark
11	(Brazil) Júnior Negrão	Ulsan Hyundai
12	(South Korea) Oh Se-hun	Sangju Sangmu
13	(South Korea) Lee Seung-gi	Jeonbuk Hyundai Motors
14	(South Korea) Um Won-sang	Gwangju FC

Round	Player of the Round	
Round	Player	Club
15	(South Korea) Na Sang-ho	Seongnam FC
16	(South Korea) Han Seung-gyu	FC Seoul
17	(South Korea) Kim Jin-su	Jeonbuk Hyundai Motors
18	(Brazil) Felipe	Gwangju FC
19	(Montenegro) Stefan Mugoša	Incheon United
20	(South Korea) Song Min-kyu	Pohang Steelers
21	(Montenegro) Dejan Damjanović	Daegu FC
22	(Serbia) Aleksandar Paločević	Pohang Steelers
23	(Australia) Adam Taggart	Suwon Samsung Bluewings
24	(South Korea) Jung Seung-hyun	Ulsan Hyundai
25	(Russia) Stanislav Iljutcenko	Pohang Steelers
26	(Brazil) Cesinha	Daegu FC
27	(South Korea) Hong Si-hoo	Seongnam FC

=== Monthly awards ===
Month	Player of the Month		Manager of the Month			Goal of the Month	
Month	Player	Club	Manager	Club	Division	Player	Club
May	(Brazil) Júnior Negrão	Ulsan	(South Korea) Kim Nam-il	Seongnam	1	(South Korea) Cho Jae-wan	Gangwon
June	(Brazil) Cesinha	Daegu	(Portugal) José Morais	Jeonbuk	1	(Brazil) Cesinha	Daegu
July	(Brazil) Júnior Negrão	Ulsan	(South Korea) Kim Do-hoon	Ulsan	1	(South Korea) Lee Dong-gyeong	Ulsan
August	(South Korea) Moon Seon-min	Sangju	(South Korea) Nam Ki-il	Jeju	2	(South Korea) Moon Seon-min	Sangju
September	(Montenegro) Stefan Mugoša	Incheon	(South Korea) Kim Gi-dong	Pohang	1	(Australia) Adam Taggart	Suwon
October	(Russia) Stanislav Iljutcenko	Pohang	(South Korea) Nam Ki-il	Jeju	2	(South Korea) Hong Si-hoo	Seongnam

=== Annual awards ===
The 2020 K League Awards was held on 5 November 2020.

Award	Winner	Club
Most Valuable Player	(South Korea) Son Jun-ho	Jeonbuk Hyundai Motors
Young Player of the Year	(South Korea) Song Min-kyu	Pohang Steelers
Top goalscorer	(Brazil) Júnior Negrão	Ulsan Hyundai
Top assist provider	(South Korea) Kang Sang-woo	Sangju Sangmu; Pohang Steelers
Manager of the Year	(South Korea) Kim Gi-dong	Pohang Steelers

Position	Best XI			
Goalkeeper	(South Korea) Jo Hyeon-woo (Ulsan)			
Defenders	(South Korea) Kim Tae-hwan (Ulsan)	(South Korea) Kwon Kyung-won (Sangju)	(South Korea) Hong Jeong-ho (Jeonbuk)	(South Korea) Kang Sang-woo (Sangju, Pohang)
Midfielders	(Serbia) Aleksandar Paločević (Pohang)	(Brazil) Cesinha (Daegu)	(South Korea) Son Jun-ho (Jeonbuk)	(South Korea) Han Kyo-won (Jeonbuk)
Forwards	(Russia) Stanislav Iljutcenko (Pohang)		(Brazil) Júnior Negrão (Ulsan)	

== Attendance ==
Attendants who entered with free ticket are not counted.

Pos	Team	Total	High	Low	Average	Change
1	Jeonbuk Hyundai Motors	16,808	10,535	0	1,200	−91.4%
2	Ulsan Hyundai	16,352	6,973	0	1,168	−87.9%
3	FC Seoul	13,047	5,485	0	931	−91.9%
4	Daegu FC	7,265	3,030	0	558	−94.8%
5	Suwon Samsung Bluewings	7,072	2,912	0	544	−93.8%
6	Incheon United	6,849	3,428	0	526	−93.8%
7	Pohang Steelers	6,996	3,280	0	499	−94.1%
8	Seongnam FC	5,066	1,655	0	361	−93.5%
9	Gangwon FC	2,978	1,967	0	212	−92.6%
10	Gwangju FC	1,711	860	0	131	−95.8%^{†}
11	Busan IPark	1,416	830	0	108	−97.4%^{†}
12	Sangju Sangmu	1,080	666	0	83	−96.5%
	League total	86,640	10,535	0	534	−93.3%

Updated to games played on 1 December 2020
Source: K League
Notes:
^{†} Teams that played previous season in K League 2.

== See also ==
- 2020 in South Korean football
- 2020 Korean FA Cup
