= Gustavo Vintecinco =

Brazilian footballer (born 1995)

Personal information
- Date of birth: 2 August 1995 (age 31)
- Place of birth: Santo André, São Paulo, Brazil
- Height: 1.93 m (6 ft 4 in)
- Position: Forward

Team information
- Current team: Busan IPark
- Number: 9

Youth career
- 2014–2015: Santo André

Senior career*
Years	Team	Apps	(Gls)
2016	XV de Jaú		
2017	União Barbarense	0	(0)
2017	Mogi Mirim	10	(0)
2018	Sertãozinho	0	(0)
2018	Bragantino	15	(3)
2019	Ansan Greeners	28	(9)
2020–2021	Busan IPark	14	(0)
2021	Maringá		
- * Club domestic league appearances and goals as of 7 February 2022

Gustavo Vintecinco (born 2 August 1995) is a Brazilian footballer who currently plays as a forward.

== Career statistics ==
=== Club ===
As of 7 February 2022.

Club	Season	League			Cup		Other		Total	
Club	Season	Division	Apps	Goals	Apps	Goals	Apps	Goals	Apps	Goals
União Barbarense	2017	–			0	0	16 (Note: Appearances in the Campeonato Paulista A2)	4	16	4
Mogi Mirim	2017	Série C	10	0	0	0	0	0	10	0
Sertãozinho	2018	–			0	0	3	1	3	1
Bragantino	2018	Série C	15	3	0	0	0	0	15	3
Bragantino B	2018	–			8 (Note: Appearances in the Copa Paulista)	3	0	0	8	3
Ansan Greeners	2019	K League 2	28	9	1	0	0	0	29	9
Busan IPark	2020	K League 1	14	0	2	2	0	0	16	2
Career total			67	12	11	5	19	5	97	22
