= Tsubasa Nishi =

Japanese footballer

Personal information
- Full name: Tsubasa Nishi
- Date of birth: 8 April 1990 (age 36)
- Place of birth: Kumamoto Prefecture, Japan
- Height: 1.75 m (5 ft 9 in)
- Position: Attacking midfielder

Youth career
- Kumamoto Lutheran High School

Senior career*
| Years | Team | Apps | (Gls) |
| –2012 | Senshu University | | |
| 2013 | Gwardia Koszalin | 28 | (4) |
| 2014–2016 | Lechia Gdańsk II | 25 | (7) |
| 2015 | → Widzew Łódź (loan) | 12 | (0) |
| 2015–2016 | → Stomil Olsztyn (loan) | 24 | (2) |
| 2016–2017 | Stomil Olsztyn | 33 | (7) |
| 2017 | Legia Warsaw II | 17 | (2) |
| 2018 | → Zemplín Michalovce (loan) | 12 | (1) |
| 2018–2021 | Daegu | 80 | (4) |
| 2022–2023 | Seoul E-Land FC | 54 | (6) |
- * Club domestic league appearances and goals

Tsubasa Nishi (西翼, Nishi Tsubasa; born 8 April 1990) is a Japanese former professional footballer who played as a midfielder.

== Club career ==
=== MFK Zemplín Michalovce ===
Nishi made his Fortuna Liga debut for Zemplín Michalovce against Slovan Bratislava on 18 February 2018.
