= Murilo Henrique =

Brazilian footballer (born 1996)

Personal information
- Full name: Murilo Henrique Pereira Rocha
- Date of birth: 20 November 1994 (age 31)
- Place of birth: São Paulo, Brazil
- Height: 1.77 m (5 ft 10 in)
- Position: Midfielder

Youth career
- 2012–2014: Goiás

Senior career*
Years	Team	Apps	(Gls)
2014–2017	Goiás	41	(1)
2017	→ Aparecidense (loan)	8	(1)
2018–2019	Linense	0	(0)
2018	→ Ponte Preta (loan)	11	(2)
2019	→ Novorizontino (loan)	0	(0)
2019	→ Botafogo SP (loan)	35	(9)
2020	Jeonbuk Hyundai Motors	17	(1)
2021–2023	Suwon FC	59	(70)
- * Club domestic league appearances and goals as of 22 October 2022

Murilo Henrique Pereira Rocha (born 20 November 1996), known as Murilo or Murilo Henrique, is a Brazilian footballer who plays as a midfielder.

== Club career ==
=== Goiás ===
Murilo started his career at Goiás getting promoted to the main team in 2014.

==== Aparecidense (loan) ====
On 3 January 2017, he joined Aparecidense on loan for the season.

=== Linense ===
On 9 January 2018, Murilo joined Linense on a permanent transfer.

==== Ponte Palo (loan) ====
On 29 March 2018, he joined Ponte Preta on loan.

==== Noborizontino (loan) ====
On 18 January 2019, he joined Noborizontino on loan for the remainder of the season.

==== Botafogo SP (loan) ====
On 16 April 2019, Murilo joined Botafogo SP on loan.

=== Jeonbuk Hyundai Motors ===
On 4 February 2020, Murilo move to Asia to joined South Korean Giants, Jeonbuk Hyundai Motors.

=== Suwon FC ===
On 19 January 2021, Murilo moved to another South Korean club, Suwon FC.

== Career statistics ==
As of 22 October 2022

Club	Season	League			State League		Cup		Continental		Other		Total	
Club	Season	Division	Apps	Goals	Apps	Goals	Apps	Goals	Apps	Goals	Apps	Goals	Apps	Goals
Goiás	2014	Série A	13	0	—		—		2 (Note: Appearance(s) in Copa Sudamericana)	0	—		15	0
Goiás	2015	Série A	18	0	2	0	1	0	2	0	—		23	0
Goiás	2016	Série B	10	1	3	1	1	0	—		—		14	2
Goiás	Total		41	1	5	1	2	0	4	0	0	0	52	2
Aparecidense	2017	Série D	8	1	11	0	—		—		—		19	1
Linense	2018	Série D	—		10	3	—		—		—		10	3
Ponte Preta	2018	Série B	11	2	—		1	0	—		—		12	2
Novorizontino	2019	Série D	—		13	2	—		—		—		13	2
Botafogo-SP	2019	Série B	35	9	—		—		—		—		35	9
Jeonbuk Hyundai Motors	2020	K League 1	17	1	—		4	1	5 (Note: Appearance(s) in AFC Champions League)	0	—		26	2
Suwon FC	2021	K League 1	36	5	—		0	0	—		—		36	5
Suwon FC	2022	K League 1	23	1	—		0	0	—		—		23	1
Suwon FC	2023	K League 1	15	4	—		0	0	—		—		15	4
Suwon FC	Total		74	10	0	0	0	0	0	0	0	0	74	10
Career total			186	24	39	6	7	1	9	0	0	0	241	31
