= Lee Seung-gi (footballer) =

South Korean footballer (born 1988)

Personal information
- Full name: Lee Seung-gi
- Date of birth: 2 June 1988 (age 38)
- Place of birth: Gwangju, South Korea
- Height: 1.77 m (5 ft 10 in)
- Position: Attacking midfielder

Team information
- Current team: Busan IPark
- Number: 88

College career
Years	Team	Apps	(Gls)
2008–2010	University of Ulsan		

Senior career*
Years	Team	Apps	(Gls)
2011–2012	Gwangju FC	65	(12)
2013–2022	Jeonbuk Hyundai Motors	201	(33)
2015–2016	→ Sangju Sangmu (army)	37	(6)
2023–	Busan IPark	16	(1)

International career^{‡}
2011–2018	South Korea	15	(0)
- * Club domestic league appearances and goals as of 17 August 2025 ‡ National team caps and goals as of 17 August 2025

- Lee Seung-gi
- Hangul: 이승기
- Hanja: 李承琪
- RR: I Seunggi
- MR: I Sŭnggi

Lee Seung-gi (Korean: 이승기; born 2 June 1988) is a South Korean football player who currently plays for Busan IPark as a midfielder, having previously played for Jeonbuk Hyundai Motors and Gwangju FC. He also represented South Korea in senior men's football.

== Club career ==
Lee, who was born on 2 June 1988, in Gwangju, was selected by Gwangju FC as a draft pick from the University of Ulsan for the 2011 K-League season. After making his first appearance for his new club in the second round 2011 K-League Cup match on 6 April 2011 against Busan I'Park, he played his first K-League game the following week against Sangju Sangmu Phoenix, which ended in a draw. Lee scored his first professional goal in Gwangju's win over Daejeon Citizen on 1 May 2011. Lee would go on to score a further seven goals during the season, finishing as his club's joint top scorer for 2011 alongside João Paulo.

Gwangju were relegated following the completion of the 2012 K-League season. In January 2013, Lee transferred to Jeonbuk Hyundai Motors.

In 2015, Lee Seung-Gi moved to Sangju Sangmu FC, because he was to enlist within two years. He was scheduled to return to Jeonbuk Hyundai Motors in 2017.

== International career ==
In 2011, Lee was selected in the Republic of Korea squad for the AFC third round of the qualification matches for the 2014 World Cup. He made his international debut as a substitute in Korea's win over the United Arab Emirates on 11 November 2011. He last represented his country in 2018, making three appearances that year.

== Career statistics ==
=== Club ===
As of 17 August 2025

Appearances and goals by club, season and competition
Club	Season	League		National cup		Continental		League cup		Total	
Club	Season	Apps	Goals	Apps	Goals	Apps	Goals	Apps	Goals	Apps	Goals
Gwangju FC	2011	25	8	1	0	—		2	0	28	8
Gwangju FC	2012	40	4	1	0	—		—		41	4
Jeonbuk Hyundai Motors	2013	21	5	2	1	7	1	—		30	7
Jeonbuk Hyundai Motors	2014	26	5	2	0	7	2	—		35	7
Sangju Sangmu (army)	2015	22	5	0	0	—		—		22	5
Sangju Sangmu (army)	2016	15	1	0	0	—		—		25	5
Jeonbuk Hyundai Motors	2016	4	0	0	0	—		—		4	0
Jeonbuk Hyundai Motors	2017	31	9	0	0	—		—		31	9
Jeonbuk Hyundai Motors	2018	27	1	0	0	10	1	—		37	2
Jeonbuk Hyundai Motors	2019	25	4	0	0	5	0	—		30	4
Jeonbuk Hyundai Motors	2020	24	5	4	3	2	0	—		30	8
Jeonbuk Hyundai Motors	2021	12	3	0	0	0	0	—		12	3
Jeonbuk Hyundai Motors	2022	16	0	1	0	7	0	—		24	0
Busan IPark	2023	8	1	0	0	—		—		8	1
Busan IPark	2024	10	0	0	0	—		—		10	0
Busan IPark	2025	0	0	0	0	—		—		0	0
Career total		306	51	11	4	38	4	2	0	375	60

== Honours ==
=== Club ===
Jeonbuk Hyundai Motors

- K League 1: 2014, 2017, 2018, 2019, 2020
- KFA Cup: 2020

Sangju Sangmu

- K League 2: 2015

=== Individual ===
- K League Young Player of the Year: 2011
- K League Top Assists Award: 2014
- K League 1 Best XI: 2014, 2017
- K League 2 Best XI: 2015
- Korean FA Cup Most Valuable Player: 2020
