= 2023 Jeonbuk Hyundai Motors season =

Jeonbuk Hyundai Motors
2023 season
- Manager: Kim Do-heon (caretaker) (until 11 June 2023); Dan Petrescu (from 14 June 2023)
- Stadium: Jeonju World Cup Stadium; Jeonju, Jeonbuk
- K League 1: 4th
- Korean FA Cup: Runners-up
- AFC Champions League: Group stage
Home colours	Away colours

The 2023 Jeonbuk Hyundai Motors season was their 30th season in existence, and the 29rd consecutive season in the K League 1. In addition to the league, the club competed in the 2023 Korean FA Cup and in the 2023–24 AFC Champions League.

The season's manager is Kim Sang-sik, who brought a more defensive approach in Jeonbuk matches ever since signing for them. Despite notable departures, the club have plenty of experienced players in this season's squad, from national team players to veterans with valuable experience after years playing either on South Korea or overseas.

== Players ==
=== Current squad ===
As of 24 July 2023

Note: Flags indicate national team as defined under FIFA eligibility rules; some limited exceptions apply. Players may hold more than one non-FIFA nationality.

No.	Pos.	Nation	Player
1	GK	KOR	Kim Jeong-hoon
2	DF	CZE	Tomáš Petrášek
3	DF	KOR	Jeong Tae-wook
4	MF	KOR	Park Jin-seop (vice-captain)
5	DF	KOR	Yun Young-sun
7	FW	KOR	Han Kyo-won
8	MF	KOR	Paik Seung-ho (vice-captain)
9	FW	BRA	Gustavo
10	FW	KOR	Park Jae-yong
11	FW	KOR	Lee Dong-jun
13	GK	KOR	Jung Min-ki
15	DF	KOR	Ku Ja-ryong
16	MF	KOR	Lee Soo-bin
17	FW	KOR	Song Min-kyu
19	FW	BRA	Rafael Silva
21	MF	JPN	Jun Amano (on loan from Yokohama F. Marinos)
23	DF	KOR	Kim Jin-su
24	FW	KOR	Lee Sung-yoon
25	DF	KOR	Choi Chul-soon
26	DF	KOR	Hong Jeong-ho (captain)
27	MF	KOR	Moon Seon-min
28	MF	KOR	Maeng Seong-ung
29	MF	KOR	Ryu Jae-moon
30	MF	KOR	Oh Jae-hyeok

No.	Pos.	Nation	Player
31	MF	KOR	Hong Jang-woo
32	DF	KOR	Jeong Woo-jae
34	DF	KOR	Yu Ye-chan
35	MF	KOR	Kang Yeong-seok
37	FW	KOR	Park Jun-beom
40	DF	KOR	Lee Woo-yeon
41	GK	KOR	Park Beom-soo
44	FW	KOR	Lee Jun-ho
47	FW	KOR	Park Chae-joon
50	FW	KOR	Yoon Do-won
51	GK	KOR	Gong Si-hyeon
55	DF	KOR	Noh Yun-sang
57	MF	GHA	Nana Boateng
63	MF	KOR	Kim Rae-woo
66	DF	KOR	Do Jae-gyeong
70	DF	KOR	Park Chang-woo
71	GK	KOR	Kim Tae-yang
77	DF	KOR	Yoo Soo-hwan
79	FW	KOR	Lee Kyu-dong
88	FW	KOR	Park Kyu-min
94	DF	KOR	Ahn Hyeon-beom
97	FW	BRA	André Luis
99	FW	KOR	Kim Chang-hoon

Squad number 12 is reserved for the team's supporters, the Mad Green Boys.

=== Out on loan ===
Note: Flags indicate national team as defined under FIFA eligibility rules; some limited exceptions apply. Players may hold more than one non-FIFA nationality.

No.	Pos.	Nation	Player
—	GK	KOR	Jeon Ji-wan (to FC Ryukyu)
—	GK	KOR	Kim Jun-hong (to Gimcheon Sangmu for military duty)
—	DF	KOR	Lee You-hyeon (to Gimcheon Sangmu for military duty)
—	DF	KOR	Park Jin-seong (to Chungbuk Cheongju)
—	MF	KOR	Kang Sang-yoon (to Busan IPark)

No.	Pos.	Nation	Player
—	MF	KOR	Kim Jin-gyu (to Gimcheon Sangmu for military duty)
—	MF	KOR	Lee Ji-hoon (to Gimcheon Sangmu for military duty)
—	MF	KOR	Lee Min-hyuk (to Gyeongnam FC)
—	FW	KOR	Eom Seung-min (to FC Mokpo)

== Transfers ==
=== Pre-season ===
Transfer In

Position	Player	Transferred from	Ref
GK	(South Korea) Jeong Min-ki	(South Korea) FC Anyang	Free
GK	(South Korea) Park Beom-su	(South Korea) Dongguk University	Free
GK	(South Korea) Kim Jeong-hoon	(South Korea) Gimcheon Sangmu	Military duty expiration
DF	(South Korea) Jeong Tae-wook	(South Korea) Daegu FC	Free
DF	(South Korea) Jeong Woo-jae	(South Korea) Jeju United	US$1.8m
DF	(South Korea) Do Jae-gyeong	(South Korea) Korea University	Free
DF	(South Korea) Yu Ye-chan	(South Korea) Jeonju University	Free
DF	(South Korea) Yoo Soo-hwan	(South Korea) Dongguk University	Free
MF	(South Korea) Lee Min-hyuk	(South Korea) Yonsei University	Free
MF	(South Korea) Lee Soo-bin	(South Korea) Pohang Steelers	Free
MF	(South Korea) Kim Geon-ung	(South Korea) Suwon FC	Free (Note: Kim Geon-ung left the club on a swap deal during mid-season to Jeju United)
MF	(South Korea) Oh Jae-hyeok	(South Korea) Bucheon FC	Free
FW	(South Korea) Lee Dong-jun	(Germany) Hertha BSC	Free
FW	(Brazil) André Luis	(Brazil) Cuiabá	Free
FW	(Brazil) Rafael Silva	(Brazil) Cruzeiro	Free

Loan Return

Position	Player	Returned From	Ref
DF	(South Korea) Lee Ju-yong	(South Korea) Incheon United	Loan Return (Note: Kim Jin-su's move to Jeju United after contract ends)
FW	(South Korea) Lee Sung-yoon	(South Korea) Seoul E-Land	Loan Return

Loan In

Position	Player	Returned From	Ref
DF	(South Korea) Kim Jin-su	(Saudi Arabia) Al-Nassr	Season loan (Note: Kim Jin-su's loan was made permanent in the mid-season transfer window)
MF	(Japan) Jun Amano	(Japan) Yokohama F. Marinos	Season loan

Promoted

Position	Player	Returned From	Ref
DF	(South Korea) Lee Kyu-dong	(South Korea) Jeonbuk Hyundai Motors U18	Promoted
MF	(South Korea) Kim Rae-woo	(South Korea) Jeonbuk Hyundai Motors U18s	Promoted
FW	(South Korea) Kim Chang-hoon	(South Korea) Jeonbuk Hyundai Motors U18s	Promoted

Transfer Out

Position	Player	Transferred To	Ref
GK	(South Korea) Hwang Byeong-keun	(South Korea) Busan IPark	Free
GK	(South Korea) Lee Bum-soo	(South Korea) Bucheon FC	Free
GK	(South Korea) Song Bum-keun	(Japan) Shonan Bellmare	Free
GK	(South Korea) Kim Jun-hong	(South Korea) Gimcheon Sangmu	Military duty
DF	(South Korea) Lee Ju-yong	(South Korea) Jeju United	Free
DF	(South Korea) Choi Hyeon-woong	(South Korea) Pohang Steelers	Free
DF	(South Korea) Choi Bo-kyung	(South Korea) Suwon FC	Free
DF	(South Korea) Park Seong-hyeon	(South Korea) Yangju Citizen	Free
DF	(South Korea) Lee Seong-min	(South Korea)	Free
MF	(South Korea) Jang Yun-ho	(South Korea) Gimpo FC	Free
MF	(South Korea) Kim Jin-kyu	(South Korea) Gimcheon Sangmu	Military duty
MF	(South Korea) Myeong Se-jin	(Serbia) FK Sloboda Užice	Free
MF	(South Korea) Kim Tae-hyeon	(South Korea)	Free
MF	(Japan) Takahiro Kunimoto	(Portugal) Casa Pia	Free
MF	(The Gambia) Modou Barrow	(Saudi Arabia) Al-Ahli	Free
FW	(Germany) Stanislav Iljutcenko	(South Korea) FC Seoul	Free
FW	(South Korea) Lee Keun-ho	(South Korea) Ansan Greeners	Free
FW	(South Korea) Bae Jae-ik	(South Korea) Goyang KH	Free
FW	(South Korea) Um Seung-min	(South Korea) FC Mokpo	Free
FW	(South Korea) Lee Yoon-gwon	(South Korea) Dangjin Citizen	Free

Loan Out

Position	Player	Loan Out	Ref
GK	(South Korea) Jeon Ji-wan	(Japan) FC Ryukyu	Season loan

=== Mid-season ===
Transfer In

Position	Player	Transferred from	Ref
DF	(Czech Republic) Tomáš Petrášek	(Poland) Raków Częstochowa	Free
DF	(South Korea) Kim Jin-su	(Saudi Arabia) Al Nassr FC	Free
DF	(South Korea) Ahn Hyeon-beom	(South Korea) Jeju United	Player Swap
MF	(Ghana) Nana Boateng	(Romania) CFR Cluj	£0.85 m
FW	(South Korea) Bak Jae-yong	(South Korea) FC Anyang	£0.67 m
FW	(South Korea) Yoon Do-won	(South Korea) Gwangdong High School	Free

Transfer Out

Position	Player	Transferred Out	Ref
DF	(South Korea) Kim Geon-ung	(South Korea) Jeju United	Player Swap
DF	(South Korea) Kim Moon-hwan	(Qatar) Al-Duhail SC	£1.4 m
FW	(South Korea) Cho Gue-sung	(Denmark) FC Midtjylland	£2.6 m

Loan Out

Position	Player	Loan Out	Ref
DF	(South Korea) Lee Min-hyuk	(South Korea) Gyeongnam FC	Season loan
MF	(South Korea) Kang Sang-yoon	(South Korea) Busan IPark	Season loan

== Competitions ==
=== Overall record ===
Competition	First match	Last match	Starting round	Final position	Record							
Competition	First match	Last match	Starting round	Final position	Pld	W	D	L	GF	GA	GD	Win %
K League 1	25 February	3 December	Matchday 1	4th	38	16	9	13	45	35	+10	42.11
FA Cup	24 May	4 November	Round of 16	Runners-up	4	3	0	1	14	7	+7	75.00
AFC CL	20 September	13 December	Group stage	Quarter-finals	6	4	0	2	12	9	+3	66.67
Total					48	23	9	16	71	51	+20	47.92

Source: Soccerway

=== K League 1 ===
The club finished as runners-up in the 2022 K League 1 season in a close race with eventual champions Ulsan Hyundai, which saw an end to a five-year streak of consecutive league titles. The club have never finished below the league's top 3 since 2009, and aims to repeat it for another year.

==== League table ====
Pos	Team	Pld	W	D	L	GF	GA	GD	Pts	Qualification or relegation (Note: Teams played each other three times (33 matches), before the league was split into two groups, the top six and the bottom six.)
2	Pohang Steelers	38	16	16	6	53	40	+13	64	Qualification for Champions League Elite league stage (Note: Since second-placed team Pohang Steelers qualified for the Champions League Elite as the Korean FA Cup champions, the spot given to the second-placed team was passed to the third-placed team.)
3	Gwangju FC	38	16	11	11	47	35	+12	59	Qualification for Champions League Elite league stage
4	Jeonbuk Hyundai Motors	38	16	9	13	45	35	+10	57	Qualification for Champions League Two group stage
5	Incheon United	38	14	14	10	46	42	+4	56	
6	Daegu FC	38	13	14	11	42	43	−1	53	

Source: Soccerway, K League
Rules for classification: 1) Points; 2) Goals scored; 3) Goal difference; 4) Wins; 5) Head-to-head points

==== Results summary ====
Overall								Home						Away					
Pld	W	D	L	GF	GA	GD	Pts	W	D	L	GF	GA	GD	W	D	L	GF	GA	GD
38	16	9	13	45	35	+10	57	10	4	5	27	17	+10	6	5	8	18	18	0

Last updated: 3 December 2023.
Source: Soccerway

==== Matches ====
As usual, the league season will be played with 38 matches split in two stages. After 33 league matches between the 12 participating teams, the teams are split into the Final Round (Top 6 teams, which aims to won an AFC Champions spot) and Relegation Round (Bottom 6 teams, that aims to survive relegation).

25 February 1	Ulsan Hyundai	2–1	Jeonbuk Hyundai Motors	Ulsan
14:00	Um Won-sang 43'; Ludwigson 64'; Joo Min-kyu (yellow card) 73'; Kim Tae-hwan (yellow card) 90+5'	Report	Song Min-kyu 10'; Kim Jin-su (yellow card) 75'; Hong Jeong-ho (yellow card) 85'	Stadium: Ulsan Munsu Football Stadium; Attendance: 28,039; Referee: Park Byeong-jin

5 March 2	Jeonbuk Hyundai Motors	1–1	Suwon Samsung Bluewings	Jeonju
14:00	Cho Gue-sung 9'; Park Jin-seob (yellow card) 31'; Kim Geon-ung (yellow card) 62'	Report	Lee Jong-sung (yellow card) 3'; Acosty 59'	Stadium: Jeonju World Cup Stadium; Attendance: 19,660; Referee: Kim Jong-hyeok

12 March 3	Jeonbuk Hyundai Motors	2–0	Gwangju FC	Jeonju
16:30	Paik Seung-ho (yellow card) 26'; Moon Seon-min 73', 75'; Gustavo (yellow card) 86'; Kim Geon-ung (yellow card) 90+2'	Report	Lee Hee-gyun (yellow card) 38'; Park Han-bin (yellow card) 60'	Stadium: Jeonju World Cup Stadium; Attendance: 8,051; Referee: An Jae-hoon

19 March 4	Daegu FC	2–0	Jeonbuk Hyundai Motors	Daegu
14:00	Kim Jin-hyuk 10'; Hwang Jae-won (yellow card) 18'; Lee Jin-yong (yellow card) 36'; Kim Kang-san (yellow card) 66'; Oh Seong-hoon (yellow card) 86'; Cesinha (yellow card) 86' (goal) 90+4'	Report	Maeng Seong-ung (yellow card) 21'; André Luis (yellow card) 86'; Hong Jeong-ho (yellow card) 86'	Stadium: DGB Daegu Bank Park; Attendance: 12,253; Referee: Choi Hyun-jai

1 April 5	Jeonbuk Hyundai Motors	1–2	Pohang Steelers	Jeonju
14:00	Ryu Jae-moon 16'; Jeong Tae-wook (yellow card) 41'; Gustavo (yellow card) 75'	Report	Jeong Jae-hee 72'; Shin Kwang-hoon (yellow card) 82'; Zeca 90+8'	Stadium: Jeonju World Cup Stadium; Attendance: 12,767; Referee: Chae Sang-hyeob

8 April 6	Jeonbuk Hyundai Motors	2–0	Incheon United	Jeonju
16:30	Amano 57'; Park Jin-seob (yellow card) 67'; Rafa Silva (yellow card) 69' (goal) 88'	Report	Mun Ji-hwan (yellow card) 26'; Delbridge (yellow card) 69'	Stadium: Jeonju World Cup Stadium; Attendance: 8,697; Referee: Kim Hee-gon

15 April 7	Suwon FC	1–0	Jeonbuk Hyundai Motors	Suwon
19:00	Veldwijk 27'; Murilo (yellow card) 42'; Jeong Dong-ho (yellow card) 65'	Report	Kim Geon-ung (yellow card) 76'	Stadium: Suwon World Cup Stadium; Attendance: 9,221; Referee: Go Hyeon-jin

23 April 8	Jeju United	0–2	Jeonbuk Hyundai Motors	Seogwipo
16:30	Lee Ju-yong (yellow card) 49' (yellow-red card) 90+3'; Lim Dong-hyuk (yellow card) 86'	Report	Rafa Silva (yellow card) 36' (yellow-red card) 75'; Song Min-kyu 40'; Han Kyo-won 89'	Stadium: Jeju World Cup Stadium; Attendance: 10,041; Referee: Lee Dong-jun

26 April 9	Jeonbuk Hyundai Motors	1–2	Daejeon Hana Citizen	Jeonju
19:30	Park Chang-woo (yellow card) 30'; Jeong Tae-wook 85'	Report	Kryvotsyuk 50'; Lee Jin-hyun 73'; Byeon Jun-soo (yellow card) 85'	Stadium: Jeonju World Cup Stadium; Attendance: 5,067; Referee: Kim Dae-yong

29 April 10	Jeonbuk Hyundai Motors	0–1	Gangwon FC	Jeonju
19:30	Lee Soo-bin (yellow card) 48'; Hong Jeong-ho (yellow card) 65' (yellow-red card) 90+7'; Kim Moon-hwan (red card) 90+8'	Report	Kim Dae-woo (yellow card) 14'; Seo Min-woo (yellow card) 49'; Kim Dae-won (yellow card) 90+2'; Yang Hyun-jun 90+5'	Stadium: Jeonju World Cup Stadium; Attendance: 5,685; Referee: Kim Yeong-soo

5 May 11	FC Seoul	1–1	Jeonbuk Hyundai Motors	Seoul
14:00	Lee Tae-seok (yellow card) 48'; Lee Han-beom (yellow card) 69'; Park Dong-jin 77'	Report	Gustavo 1'; Choi Chul-soon (yellow card) 65'; André Luis (yellow card) 90+5'	Stadium: Seoul World Cup Stadium; Attendance: 37,008; Referee: Kim Dae-yong

10 May 12	Suwon Samsung Bluewings	0–3	Jeonbuk Hyundai Motors	Suwon
19:30 KST	Yoo Je-ho (yellow card) 8'; Bulthuis (yellow card) 26' (yellow-red card) 64'	Report	Kim Jeong-hoon (yellow card) 28'; Maeng Seong-ung (yellow card) 37'; Paik Seung-ho 40', 65'; Moon Seon-min 49'	Stadium: Suwon World Cup Stadium; Attendance: 7,867; Referee: Jeong Dong-sik

14 May 13	Incheon United	0–0	Jeonbuk Hyundai Motors	Incheon
16:30 KST		Report	Kim Dong-min (yellow card) 11'; Delbridge (yellow card) 46'; Mun Ji-hwan (yellow card) 90+4'	Stadium: Incheon Football Stadium; Attendance: 15,738; Referee: Kim Woo-seong

21 May 14	Jeonbuk Hyundai Motors	3–1	Suwon FC	Jeonju
19:00 KST	Paik Seung-ho 7'; Lee Soo-min (yellow card) 17'; Song Min-kyu 53'; Park Jin-seop 83'	Report	Kim Seon-min (yellow card) 6'	Stadium: Jeonju World Cup Stadium; Attendance: 13,634; Referee: Ko Hyung-jin

29 May 15	Pohang Steelers	1–0	Jeonbuk Hyundai Motors	Pohang
16:30 KST	Goh Young-joon 67'	Report	Jeong Tae-wook (yellow card) 45+3'; Kim Jin-su (yellow card) 90+1'	Stadium: Pohang Steel Yard; Attendance: 14,337; Referee: Kim Woo-seong

3 June 16	Jeonbuk Hyundai Motors	2–0	Ulsan Hyundai	Jeonju
16:30 KST	Cho Gue-sung 84'; Kim Geon-ung (yellow card) 88'; Song Min-kyu (yellow card) 90'; Moon Seon-min 90+4'	Report	Kim Kee-hee (yellow card) 40'	Stadium: Jeonju World Cup Stadium; Attendance: 27,797; Referee: Lee Dong-jun

7 June 17	Jeonbuk Hyundai Motors	1–0	Daegu FC	Jeonju
19:00 KST	Song Min-kyu 57'; Maeng Seong-ung (yellow card) 90+2'	Report	Hwang Jae-won (yellow card) 71'; Cesinha (yellow card) 90+2'	Stadium: Jeonju World Cup Stadium; Attendance: 8,197; Referee: Jeong Dong-sik

11 June 18	Gangwon FC	1–2	Jeonbuk Hyundai Motors	Chuncheon
16:30 KST	Jeong Tae-wook 46' (o.g.); Yoon Suk-young (yellow card) 67'	Report	Cho Gue-sung 58', 77'; Koo Ja-ryong (yellow card) 79'	Stadium: Chuncheon Songam Stadium; Attendance: 6,114; Referee: Shin Young-jun

24 June 19	Gwangju FC	2–0	Jeonbuk Hyundai Motors	Gwangju
19:00 KST	Lee Soon-min 19'; Letschert (yellow card) 58'; Lee Kun-hee 90+1'	Report	Moon Seon-min (yellow card) 45+4'	Stadium: Gwangju Football Stadium; Attendance: 5,990; Referee: Koh Hyung-jin

1 July 20	Jeonbuk Hyundai Motors	2–0	Jeju United	Jeonju
18:00 KST	Lim Chae-min 9' (o.g.); Moon Seon-min 83'	Report		Stadium: Jeonju World Cup Stadium; Attendance: 12,175; Referee: Jo Ji-eum

8 July 21	Jeonbuk Hyundai Motors	2-1	FC Seoul	Jeonju
19:30 KST	Cho Gue-sung 66'; Rafa Silva 75'	Report	Na Sang-ho 90+8'	Stadium: Jeonju World Cup Stadium; Attendance: 21,139

12 July 22	Daejeon Hana Citizen	2-2	Jeonbuk Hyundai Motors	Daejeon
19:30 KST	Kim Ingyun 75'; Shin Sang-eun 91'	Report	Song Min-kyu 18'; Rafa Silva 93'	Stadium: Daejeon World Cup Stadium; Attendance: 20,592

16 July 23	Jeonbuk Hyundai Motors	1-0	Suwon FC	Jeonju
19:00 KST	Gustavo 12'	Report		Stadium: Jeonju World Cup Stadium; Attendance: 10,905

21 July 24	Pohang Steelers	2-1	Jeonbuk Hyundai Motors	Pohang
19:30 KST	Han Chan-hee 34'; Lee Ho-jae 88'		Moon Seon-min 3'	Stadium: Pohang Steel Yard; Attendance: 9,055

6 August 25	Jeonbuk Hyundai Motors	2-0	Incheon United	Jeonju
19:00 KST	Bak Jae-Yong 34'; Han Kyo-won 44'	Report		Stadium: Jeonju World Cup Stadium; Attendance: 10,327

12 August 26	Jeonbuk Hyundai Motors	1-1	Suwon Samsung Bluewings	Jeonju
19:00 KST	Han Kyo-won 65'		Han Ho-gang 30'	Stadium: Jeonju World Cup Stadium

19 August 27	Ulsan Hyundai	1-0	Jeonbuk Hyundai Motors	Ulsan
19:00 KST	Um Won-sang 71'	Report		Stadium: Ulsan World Cup Stadium; Attendance: 30,756

25 August 28	Jeonbuk Hyundai Motors	1-1	Daejeon Hana Citizen	Jeonju
19:30 KST	Song Min-kyu 38'		Tiago Orobó 33'	Stadium: Jeonju World Cup Stadium

3 September 29	Jeju United	0-0	Jeonbuk Hyundai Motors	Seogwipo
19:00 KST				Stadium: Jeju World Cup Stadium; Attendance: D

16 September 30	Jeonbuk Hyundai Motors	1-3	Gangwon FC	Jeonju
14:00 KST	Gustavo 5' (pen.)		Vitor Gabriel 45+1'; Jefferson Galego 45+3'; Kim Dae-won 76'	Stadium: Jeonju World Cup Stadium

24 September 31	Gwangju FC	0-1	Jeonbuk Hyundai Motors	Gwangju
14:00 KST			Doo Hyeon-seok 73' (o.g.)	Stadium: Gwangju Football Stadium

30 September 32	Jeonbuk Hyundai Motors	1-3	Daegu FC	Jeonju
16:30 KST	Nana Boateng 25'		Go Jae-hyun 1', 58'; Lucas Barcellos 7'	Stadium: Jeonju World Cup Stadium

8 October 33	FC Seoul	0-2	Jeonbuk Hyundai Motors	Seoul
15:30 KST			60' Han Kyo-won; 75' Gustavo	Stadium: Seoul World Cup Stadium

21 October 34 (Final round)	Daegu FC	1-2	Jeonbuk Hyundai Motors	Daegu
16:30 KST				Stadium: DGB Daegu Bank Park

28 October 35 (Final round)	Jeonbuk Hyundai Motors	1-1	Pohang Steelers	Jeonju
14:00 KST	Gustavo 54' (pen.)		Zeca 70' (pen.)	Stadium: Jeonju World Cup Stadium

12 November 36 (Final round)	Incheon United	1-1	Jeonbuk Hyundai Motors	Incheon
14:00 KST			Bak Jae-yong	Stadium: Incheon Football Stadium

25 November 37 (Final round)	Jeonbuk Hyundai Motors	2-0	Gwangju FC	Jeonju
14:00 KST				Stadium: Jeonju World Cup Stadium

3 December 38 (Final round)	Ulsan Hyundai	1-0	Jeonbuk Hyundai Motors	Ulsan
14:00 KST	Seol Young-woo 32'			Stadium: Ulsan Munsu Football Stadium

=== Korean FA Cup ===
The club will start the competition at the Round of 16, winning an bye to the round as a 2023–24 AFC Champions League team.

24 May 4th Round	Jeonbuk Hyundai Motors	5–2 (a.e.t.)	Paju Citizen	Jeonju
19:00 (UTC+9)	Gustavo 29', 38', 103', 115'; Park Jin-seop 111'		Kwak Rae-seung 33'; Seong Jeong-yoon 59'	Stadium: Jeonju World Cup Stadium; Attendance: 2,168; Referee: Jo Ji-eum

28 June Quarter-finals	Jeonbuk Hyundai Motors	4–0	Gwangju FC	Jeonju
19:00 (UTC+9)	Song Min-kyu 57'; Cho Gue-sung 62' (pen.), 88'; Jun Amano 68'			Stadium: Jeonju World Cup Stadium; Attendance: 4,732; Referee: Jeong Dong-sik

1 November Semi-finals	Jeonbuk Hyundai Motors	3–1	Incheon United	Jeonju
19:00 (UTC+9)	Moon Seon-min 23'; Paik Seung-ho 62'; Park Jae-yong 90+7' (pen.)		39' Gerso Fernandes	Stadium: Jeonju World Cup Stadium; Referee: KIM Jong-hyeok

4 November Final	Pohang Steelers	4–2	Jeonbuk Hyundai Motors	Pohang Steel Yard, Pohang
14:15 (UTC+9)	Han Chan-hee 44'; Zeca 74'; Kim Jong-woo 78'; Hong Yun-sang 90+2'		Song Min-kyu 17'; Gustavo 51' (pen.)	Attendance: 12,759; Referee: Lee Dong-jun

=== AFC Champions League ===
The AFC plans to start the new Champions League season on September. Jeonbuk will start the competition at the group stage, having granted the spot through a 2nd-place finish at the 2022 K League 1 and the 2022 Korean FA Cup title.

==== Group stage ====
Pos	Team	Pld	W	D	L	GF	GA	GD	Pts	Qualification	UTD	JBH	LCS	KIT
1	(Thailand) Bangkok United	6	4	1	1	11	8	+3	13	Advance to round of 16	—	3–2	1–0	1–1
2	(South Korea) Jeonbuk Hyundai Motors	6	4	0	2	12	9	+3	12	Advance to round of 16	3–2	—	3–0	2–1
3	(Singapore) Lion City Sailors	6	2	0	4	5	9	−4	6		1–2	2–0	—	0–2
4	(Hong Kong) Kitchee	6	1	1	4	7	9	−2	4		1–2	1–2	1–2	—

Source: AFC
Rules for classification: Tiebreakers

20 September 2023 Matchday 1	Jeonbuk Hyundai Motors (South Korea)	2–1	(Hong Kong) Kitchee	Jeonju, Republic of Korea
19:00 UTC+9	Hong Jeong-ho 6' (yellow card) 69'; Han Kyo-won 61'	Report	Mikael 56'; Cleiton (yellow card) 36'; Oliver Gerbig (yellow card) 58'	Stadium: Jeonju World Cup Stadium; Attendance: 2,931; Referee: Mooud Bonyadifar (Iran)

4 October 2023 Matchday 2	Bangkok United (Thailand)	3–2	(South Korea) Jeonbuk Hyundai Motors	Thammasat Stadium, Rangsit
--:-- UTC+7	Poomchantuek 26'; Ahn Hyeon-beom 58' (o.g.); Willen 82'; Peerapat Notchaiya (yellow card) 49'; Thitiphan Puangchan (yellow card) 67'	Report	Limwannasathian 19' (o.g.); Moon Seon-Min 88'	Attendance: 2,190; Referee: Adel Al Naqbi (United Arab Emirates)

25 October 2023 Matchday 3	Jeonbuk Hyundai Motors (South Korea)	3–0	(Singapore) Lion City Sailors	Jeonju, Republic of Korea
19:00 UTC+9	Jun Amano 5'; Lionel Tan 32' (o.g.); Moon Seon-min 57'	Report	Hariss Harun (yellow card) 18'; Richairo Zivkovic (yellow card) 33'; Manuel Herrera López (yellow card) 63'	Stadium: Jeonju World Cup Stadium; Attendance: 4,872; Referee: Khamis Al-Marri (Qatar)

8 November 2023 Matchday 4	Lion City Sailors (Singapore)	2–0	(South Korea) Jeonbuk Hyundai Motors	Jalan Besar, Singapore
--:-- UTC+8	Richairo Zivkovic 23', 55'; Hafiz Nor (yellow card) 47'; Christopher van Huizen (yellow card) 78'; Manuel Herrera López (yellow card) 89'	Report	Jeong Tae-wook (yellow card) 52'; Moon Seon-min (yellow card) 66'; Gustavo (penalty missed) 89	Stadium: Jalan Besar Stadium; Referee: Mouood Bonyadifar (Iran)

29 November 2023 Matchday 5	Kitchee (Hong Kong)	1–2	(South Korea) Jeonbuk Hyundai Motors	Causeway Bay, Hong Kong
20:00 UTC+8	Jakob Jantscher 69'; Shinichi Chan (yellow card) 11'; Law Tsz Chun (yellow card) 17'; Mikael (yellow card) 90+5'	Report	Moon Seon-Min 2'; Song Min-kyu 38'; Lee Dong-jun (yellow card) 15'; Jeong Tae-wook (red card) 45'; Kim Jeong-hoon (yellow card) 83'	Stadium: Hong Kong Stadium; Referee: Akhrol Risqullaev (Uzbekistan)

13 December 2023 Matchday 6	Jeonbuk Hyundai Motors (South Korea)	3–2	(Thailand) Bangkok United	Jeonju, Republic of Korea
19:00 UTC+9	Moon Seon-min 42'; Lee Dong-jun 76', 78'	Report	Wanchai Jarunongkran 4'; Rungrath Poomchantuek 85'	Stadium: Jeonju World Cup Stadium; Referee: Khaled Al Teris (Saudi Arabia)

== Team statistics ==
=== Appearances and goals (LCS) ===
As of 13 Dec 2023

No.	Pos.	Player	K-League		Korean FA Cup		AFC Champions League		Total	
No.	Pos.	Player	Apps	Goals	Apps	Goals	Apps	Goals	Apps	Goals
1	GK	(South Korea) Kim Jeong-hoon	29	0	3	0	3	0	27	0
2	DF	(Czech Republic) Tomáš Petrášek	4+3	0	0	0	0+1	0	8	0
3	DF	(South Korea) Jeong Tae-wook	29+2	1	3	0	4	0	31	1
4	DF	(South Korea) Park Jin-seop	30+2	1	3+1	1	3+1	0	30	2
5	DF	(South Korea) Yun Young-sun	0+1	0	1	0	0	0	2	0
6	MF	(South Korea) Kim Geon-ung	6+5	0	1	0	0	0	12	0
7	FW	(South Korea) Han Kyo-won	17+11	5	2+1	0	2+2	1	28	6
8	MF	(South Korea) Paik Seung-ho	23+4	3	2+1	1	2+1	0	24	3
9	FW	(Brazil) Gustavo	14+16	6	2	5	2+1	0	32	9
10	FW	(South Korea) Bak Jae-yong	4+4	2	1+1	1	4	0	4	1
11	FW	(South Korea) Lee Dong-jun	13+10	0	1+1	0	4+1	2	23	0
13	GK	(South Korea) Jeong Min-Ki	9	0	1	0	3	0	11	0
15	DF	(South Korea) Ku Ja-ryong	19+4	0	2+1	0	4+1	0	25	0
16	MF	(South Korea) Lee Soo-bin	11+3	1	1	0	2+4	0	14	1
17	MF	(South Korea) Song Min-kyu	19+11	6	3	2	2+2	1	28	6
19	FW	(Brazil) Rafael Silva	15+10	3	0	0	0	0	24	3
21	MF	(Japan) Jun Amano	14+11	1	1	1	4+1	1	24	2
23	DF	(South Korea) Kim Jin-su	18+1	0	2+1	0	5	0	19	0
25	DF	(South Korea) Choi Chul-soon	9+10	0	2	0	0+2	0	18	0
26	DF	(South Korea) Hong Jeong-ho	18+4	0	2	0	3	1	19	1
27	FW	(South Korea) Moon Seon-min	13+21	5	2+2	1	5+1	4	34	6
28	MF	(South Korea) Maeng Seong-ung	11+6	0	1	0	1+2	0	17	0
29	FW	(South Korea) Ryu Jae-moon	10+4	1	2	0	2	0	18	1
30	DF	(South Korea) Oh Jae-hyeok	2+2	0	0	0	0+1	0	5	0
32	DF	(South Korea) Jeong Woo-jae	22+4	0	2	0	2+2	0	27	0
44	DF	(South Korea) Lee Jun-ho	4+4	0	0	0	0+2	0	5	0
57	MF	(Ghana) Nana Boateng	13	1	0+2	0	3+1	0	13	1
70	DF	(South Korea) Park Chang-woo	3+12	0	0+1	0	0+1	0	15	0
94	DF	(South Korea) Ahn Hyeon-beom	8+2	1	1	0	5	0	10	0
97	FW	(Brazil) André Luis	7+2	0	1	0	0+1	0	10	0
Players featured on a match but left the club mid-season either permanently
10	FW	(South Korea) Cho Gue-sung	8+4	5	1+1	2	0	0	14	7
18	MF	(South Korea) Lee Min-hyuk	3	0	0	0	0	0	3	0
33	DF	(South Korea) Kim Moon-hwan	11	0	1	0	0	0	12	0
Players featured on a match but left the club mid-season on loan transfer
36	MF	(South Korea) Kang Sang-yoon	1	0	0	0	0	0	1	0
