= Green Boys =

Green Boys may refer to:

- Green Boys of Dublin, 1781 Irish regiment in the American Revolutionary War
- FC Green Boys 77 Harlange-Tarchamps, Luxembourg football club
- Gre4n Boyz, current name of the Japanese band Greeeen.

== See also ==
- Mad Green Boys, fanclub of Jeonbuk Hyundai Motors football club
- Green Mountain Boys, 18th-century militia in the New York–New Hampshire area
- "The Boys in Green", Republic of Ireland national football team song for the 1988 European Championship finals
