= Maeng Seong-ung =

Korean footballer (born 1998)

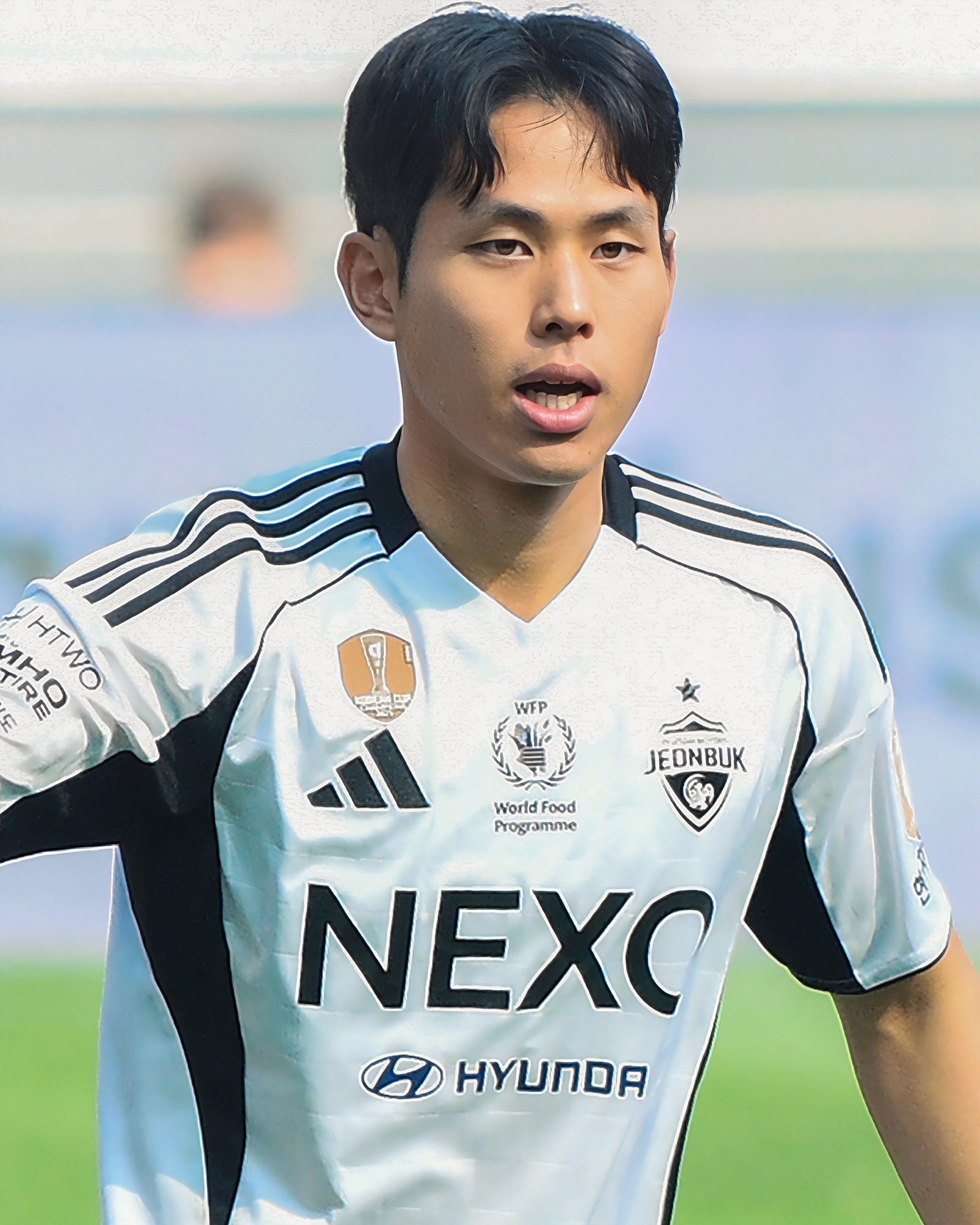
- Maeng in 2026

Personal information
- Date of birth: 4 February 1998 (age 28)
- Place of birth: South Korea
- Height: 1.83 m (6 ft 0 in)
- Position: Midfielder

Team information
- Current team: Jeonbuk Hyundai Motors
- Number: 6

Youth career
- Paichai High School
- –2018: Yeungnam University

Senior career*
Years	Team	Apps	(Gls)
2019–2021	FC Anyang	84	(1)
2022–	Jeonbuk Hyundai Motors	55	(0)
2024–2025	→ Gimcheon Sangmu (draft)	29	(2)

International career^{‡}
2019–	South Korea U23	8 (Note: Includes one appearance against another KFA team.)	(0)
Medal record
Representing South Korea
Men's football
AFC U-23 Championship
Gold medal – first place	2020 Thailand
- * Club domestic league appearances and goals as of 3 August 2026 ‡ National team caps and goals as of 18:35, 12 June 2021 (UTC)

- Maeng Seong-ung
- Hangul: 맹성웅
- RR: Maeng Seongung
- MR: Maeng Sŏngung

Maeng Seong-ung (Korean: 맹성웅; born 4 February 1998) is a South Korean footballer currently playing as a midfielder for Jeonbuk Hyundai Motors.

== Early life ==
Maeng was born in South Korea. He went to Paichai High School, before going to Yeungnam University.

== Career ==
Maeng joined FC Anyang in 2019. He scored his first goal for Anyang on 27 February 2021, scoring one of the winning goals against Gyeongnam FC. He stayed with them for 2 years, before joining Jeonbuk Hyundai Motors in 2022.

== International career ==
Maeng was part of the squad that won the AFC U-23 Championship in 2020 with the South Korea under 23 side.

== Career statistics ==
=== Club ===
As of 27 October 2022.

Club	Season	League			Cup		Continental		Other		Total	
Club	Season	Division	Apps	Goals	Apps	Goals	Apps	Goals	Apps	Goals	Apps	Goals
FC Anyang	2019	K League 2	26	0	3 (Note: Appearances in Korean FA Cup)	0	—		—		29	0
FC Anyang	2020	K League 2	24	0	2	0	—		—		26	0
FC Anyang	2021	K League 2	34	1	1	0	—		1	0	36	1
FC Anyang	Total		84	1	6	0	0	0	1	0	91	1
Jeonbuk Hyundai Motors	2022	K League 1	16	0	3	0	4 (Note: Appearances in AFC Champions League)	0	—		23	0
Jeonbuk Hyundai Motors	2023	K League 1	0	0	0	0	—		—		0	0
Jeonbuk Hyundai Motors	Total		16	3	0	4	0	0	1	0	23	0
Career total			100	1	9	0	4	0	1	0	114	1

== Honours ==
=== International ===
South Korea U23

- AFC U-23 Championship: 2020
