= Cho Gue-sung =

South Korean footballer (born 1998)

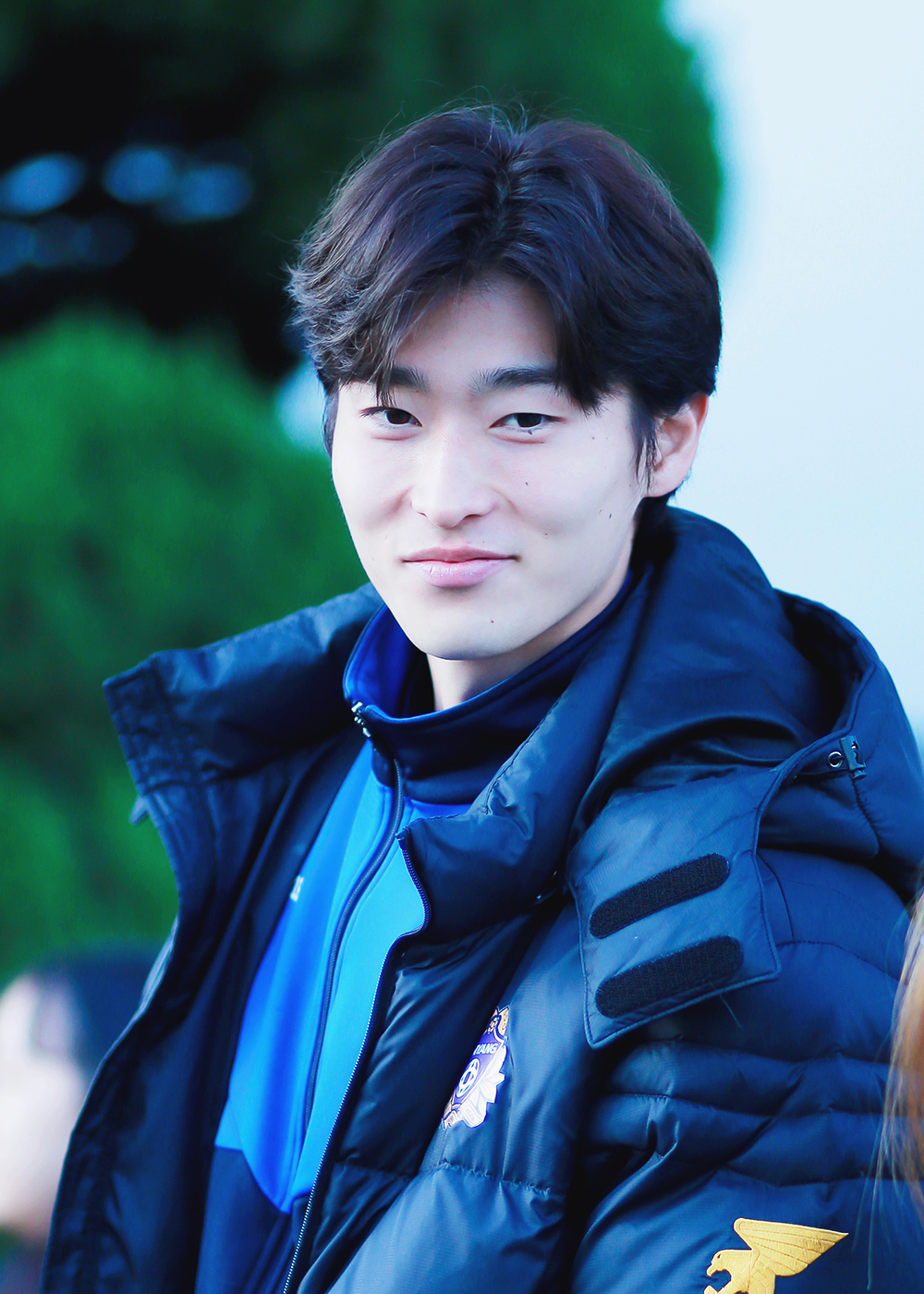
- Cho with FC Anyang in 2019

Personal information
- Full name: Cho Gue-sung
- Date of birth: 25 January 1998 (age 28)
- Place of birth: Ansan, South Korea
- Height: 1.88 m (6 ft 2 in)
- Position: Striker

Team information
- Current team: Midtjylland
- Number: 10

Youth career
- 2013: Anyang Technical High School
- 2014–2015: FC Anyang (Note: Anyang Technical High School became an academy of FC Anyang in 2014.)

College career
Years	Team	Apps	(Gls)
2016–2018	Gwangju University		

Senior career*
Years	Team	Apps	(Gls)
2019	FC Anyang	31	(14)
2020–2023	Jeonbuk Hyundai Motors	43	(13)
2021–2022	→ Gimcheon Sangmu (draft)	48	(21)
2023–	Midtjylland	68	(17)

International career^{‡}
2019–2021	South Korea U23	11 (Note: Includes two appearances against another KFA team.)	(4)
2021–	South Korea	46	(12)
Medal record
Men's football
Representing South Korea
AFC U-23 Championship
Winner	2020 Thailand
EAFF Championship
Runner-up	2022 Japan
- * Club domestic league appearances and goals as of 9 November 2026 ‡ National team caps and goals as of 24 June 2026

- Korean name
- Hangul: 조규성
- Hanja: 曺圭成
- RR: Jo Gyuseong
- MR: Cho Kyusŏng
- IPA: [t͡ɕo.ɡju.sʌŋ]

Cho Gue-sung (Korean: 조규성; born 25 January 1998) is a South Korean professional footballer who plays as striker for Danish Superliga club Midtjylland and the South Korea national team.

== Club career ==
=== Early career in South Korea ===
Cho played defensive midfielder during his youth career and freshman year at Gwangju University. However, Cho was not evaluated as a good midfielder by his university's head coach Lee Seung-won and changed his position to striker in 2017.

In 2019, Cho joined K League 2 side FC Anyang where he was a youth player before. He was selected for the K League 2 Best XI after becoming the third highest scorer in his first professional season and transferred to K League 1 club Jeonbuk Hyundai Motors the next year.

Cho had difficulty proving his worth in his first season at Jeonbuk Hyundai Motors. In 2021, he joined the military team Gimcheon Sangmu to serve his mandatory duty and to get a stable spot. As a result, he developed physically and technically while being trained at Gimcheon. He became the top goalscorer in the 2022 K League 1 and led Jeonbuk to the 2022 Korean FA Cup title.

In January 2023, Jeonbuk received transfer bids for him from Mainz 05, Celtic, Rangers and Minnesota United. Cho was attracted to Mainz and Celtic but rejected their offers after determining that his physical condition was not good enough to play in Europe.

=== Midtjylland ===
On 11 July 2023, Cho signed with Danish Superliga club Midtjylland on a five-year contract for a fee reported to be around £2.6 million. On 22 July 2023, he made his Danish Superliga debut with Midtjylland, scoring in a 1–0 win over Hvidovre. Having a considerable presence at Midtjylland early on, he was selected for the Superliga Team of the Month in July and September.

He won the most duels and aerial duels in the 2023–24 Danish Superliga. He successfully performed the role of target man, while helping his team win the league title.

Cho suffered knee pain during the 2023–24 season and underwent knee surgery at the end of the season to remove his meniscus in Italy. Despite anticipating a full recovery by the start of the 2024–25 season, he contracted a bacterial infection which further complicated his rehabilitation and forced him to undergo another operation. This resulted in Cho sitting out the entire 2024–25 season.

On 17 August 2025, Cho made his first appearance in 448 days towards the end of a Superliga match against Vejle. On 29 September, he scored a bicycle kick goal against Randers, which was selected as the Superliga Goal of the Month.

== International career ==
Cho made his senior debut for South Korea on 7 September 2021 in a World Cup qualifier against Lebanon. He scored his first international goal on 15 January 2022 in a friendly against Iceland at the Mardan Sports Complex.

In November 2022, Cho was named to the 26-man squad for the 2022 FIFA World Cup. In Korea's second match at the tournament, he scored two goals against Ghana in an eventual 2–3 defeat, becoming the first South Korean player to ever score 2 or more goals in a single World Cup match. Despite losing that match, the goals proved decisive in ultimately sending Korea through to the Round of 16 on goal difference, at the expense of Uruguay. Due to his performance in 2022 FIFA World Cup, Cho proved to be one of the greatest players in the air in Qatar. The young Korean forward won 21 aerial duels, putting him second in terms of success in the air among all players at the World Cup, after Morocco's Youssef En-Nesyri.

Cho was called up for the 2023 AFC Asian Cup, and was expected to play as an influential striker for the South Korean national team during Hwang Ui-jo's absence. However, he disappointed Koreans by missing five big chances and winning only 35% of duels while scoring one goal in six matches (although he did score against Saudi Arabia as the Koreans would win on penalties); especially after receiving a yellow card for diving instead of shooting in front of Jordan's goal when Jordan held a 2–0 lead in the 88th minute during the semi-finals.

Cho received a call-up from Hong Myung-bo to join the 2026 FIFA World Cup squad.

== Career statistics ==
=== Club ===
As of match played 9 November 2026

Appearances and goals by club, season and competition
Club	Season	League			National cup (Note: Includes Korean FA Cup, Danish Cup)		Continental		Other		Total	
Club	Season	Division	Apps	Goals	Apps	Goals	Apps	Goals	Apps	Goals	Apps	Goals
FC Anyang	2019	K League 2	31	14	3	0	—		2 (Note: Appearances in K League 2 promotion play-offs)	0	36	14
Jeonbuk Hyundai Motors	2020	K League 1	23	4	5	1	6 (Note: Appearances in AFC Champions League)	3	—		34	8
Jeonbuk Hyundai Motors	2022	K League 1	8	4	3	4	—		—		11	8
Jeonbuk Hyundai Motors	2023	K League 1	12	5	2	1	—		—		14	6
Jeonbuk Hyundai Motors	Total		43	13	10	6	6	3	—		59	22
Gimcheon Sangmu (draft)	2021	K League 2	25	8	2	1	—		—		27	9
Gimcheon Sangmu (draft)	2022	K League 1	23	13	1	0	—		—		24	13
Gimcheon Sangmu (draft)	Total		48	21	3	1	—		—		51	22
Midtjylland	2023–24	Danish Superliga	30	12	2	0	5 (Note: Appearances in UEFA Conference League)	1	—		37	13
Midtjylland	2025–26	Danish Superliga	26	3	7	2	9 (Note: Appearances in UEFA Europa League)	2	—		42	7
Midtjylland	2026–27	Danish Superliga	12	2	1	0	9 (Note: Two appearances in UEFA Europa League, seven appearances three goals in UEFA Conference League)	3	—		22	5
Midtjylland	Total		68	17	10	2	23	6	—		101	25
Career total			190	65	26	9	29	9	2	0	247	83

=== International ===
As of match played 24 June 2026

Appearances and goals by national team and year
National team	Year	Apps	Goals
South Korea	2021	4	0
South Korea	2022	16	6
South Korea	2023	10	2
South Korea	2024	9	1
South Korea	2025	2	1
South Korea	2026	5	2
Total		46	12

Scores and results list South Korea's goal tally first, score column indicates score after each Cho goal.

List of international goals scored by Cho Gue-sung
No.	Date	Venue	Opponent	Score	Result	Competition
1	15 January 2022	Mardan Sports Complex, Antalya, Turkey	Iceland	1–0	5–1	Friendly
2	27 January 2022	Saida Municipal Stadium, Sidon, Lebanon	Lebanon	1–0	1–0	2022 FIFA World Cup qualification
3	14 June 2022	Seoul World Cup Stadium, Seoul, South Korea	Egypt	3–1	4–1	Friendly
4	20 July 2022	Toyota Stadium, Toyota, Japan	China	3–0	3–0	2022 EAFF Championship
5	28 November 2022	Education City Stadium, Al Rayyan, Qatar	Ghana	1–2	2–3	2022 FIFA World Cup
6	28 November 2022	Education City Stadium, Al Rayyan, Qatar	Ghana	2–2	2–3	2022 FIFA World Cup
7	12 September 2023	St James' Park, Newcastle upon Tyne, England	Saudi Arabia	1–0	1–0	Friendly
8	16 November 2023	Seoul World Cup Stadium, Seoul, South Korea	Singapore	1–0	5–0	2026 FIFA World Cup qualification
9	30 January 2024	Education City Stadium, Al Rayyan, Qatar	Saudi Arabia	1–1	1–1 (a.e.t.) (4–2 p)	2023 AFC Asian Cup
10	14 November 2025	Daejeon World Cup Stadium, Daejeon, South Korea	Bolivia	2–0	2–0	Friendly
11	30 May 2026	South Field, Provo, United States	Trinidad and Tobago	3–0	5–0	Friendly
12	30 May 2026	South Field, Provo, United States	Trinidad and Tobago	5–0	5–0	Friendly

== Honours ==
Jeonbuk Hyundai Motors

- K League 1: 2020
- Korean FA Cup: 2020, 2022

Gimcheon Sangmu

- K League 2: 2021

Midtjylland

- Danish Superliga: 2023–24
- Danish Cup: 2025–26

South Korea U23

- AFC U-23 Championship: 2020

South Korea

- EAFF Championship runner-up: 2022

Individual

- K League 2 Best XI: 2019
- Korean FA Goal of the Year: 2020
- K League Goal of the Month: March 2022
- K League All-Star: 2022
- K League 1 top goalscorer: 2022
- K League 1 Best XI: 2022
- Korean FA Cup Most Valuable Player: 2022
- Danish Superliga Goal of the Month: September 2025
