= Green Linnet =

Green Linnet, green linnet, or Green Linnets may refer to:

- Green Linnet Records, American independent record label that specialized in Celtic music
- green linnet (Chloris chloris), another name for the European greenfinch
- Green Linnets, 39th (Dorsetshire) Regiment of Foot nickname
- Green Linnets (Ireland), Irish regiment in the American War of Independence
