= Song Min-kyu =

Song Min-kyu may refer to:

- Song Min-kyu (footballer) (born 1999)
- Song Min-kyu (tennis) (born 1990)
