= Paik Seung-ho =

South Korean footballer (born 1997)

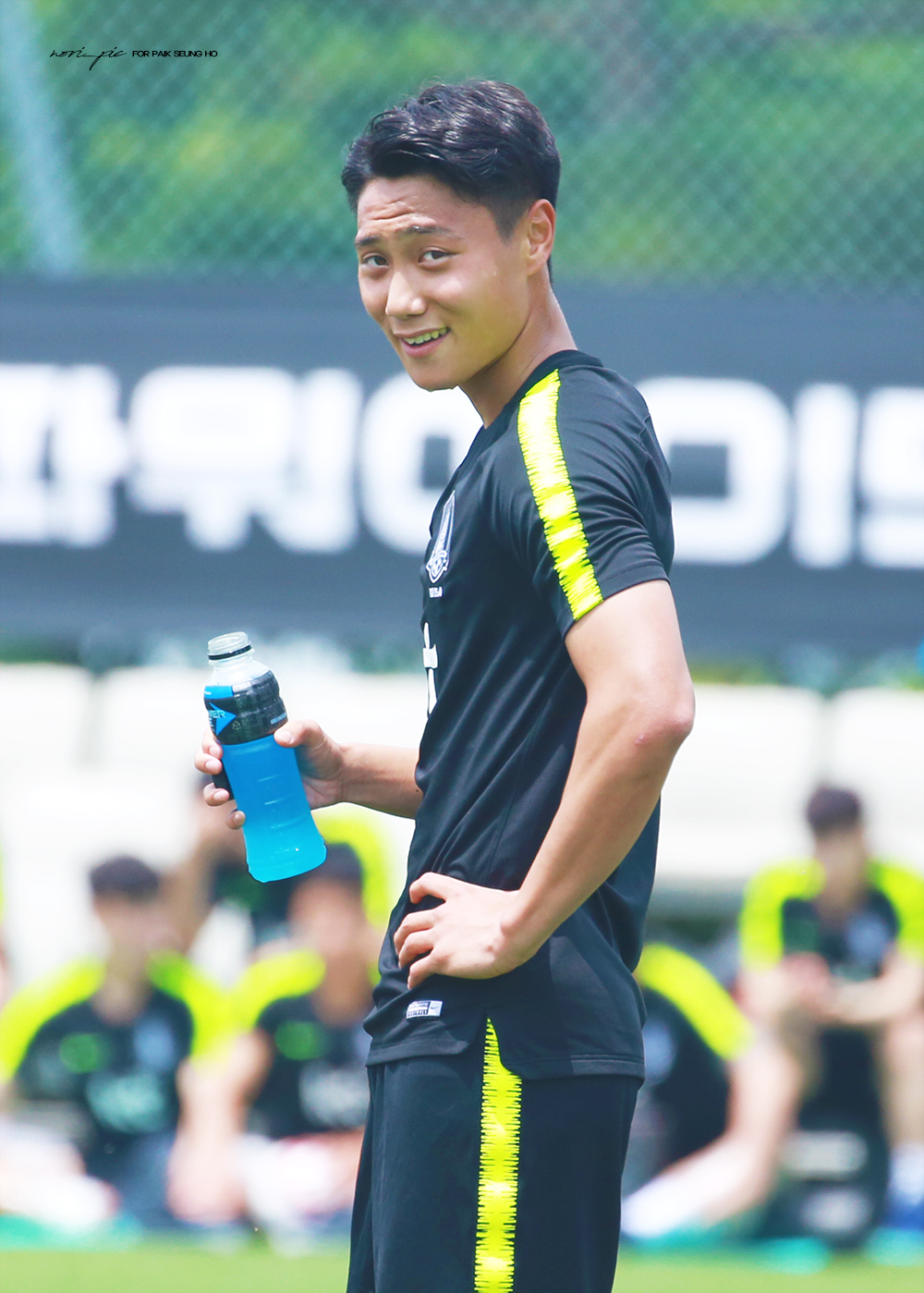
- Paik in June 2019

Personal information
- Full name: Paik Seung-ho
- Date of birth: 17 March 1997 (age 29)
- Place of birth: Seoul, South Korea
- Height: 1.82 m (6 ft 0 in)
- Position: Central midfielder

Team information
- Current team: Birmingham City
- Number: 8

Youth career
- 2004–2009: Seoul Daedong Elementary School
- 2009–2010: Suwon Samsung Bluewings (Note: Played for Maetan Middle School, which was an academy of Suwon Samsung Bluewings.)
- 2010–2016: Barcelona

Senior career*
Years	Team	Apps	(Gls)
2016–2017	Barcelona B	2	(0)
2017–2019	Peralada	55	(2)
2019	Girona	3	(0)
2019–2021	Darmstadt 98	41	(2)
2021–2023	Jeonbuk Hyundai Motors	82	(9)
2024–	Birmingham City	112	(7)

International career^{‡}
2014–2017	South Korea U20	20	(7)
2019–2023	South Korea U23	12 (Note: Includes seven appearances and three goals as an overage player in Asian Games.)	(3)
2019–	South Korea	30	(3)
Medal record
Men's football
Representing South Korea
Asian Games
Gold medal – first place	2022 Hangzhou
EAFF Championship
Runner-up	2022 Japan
- * Club domestic league appearances and goals as of 22 November 2026 (UTC) ‡ National team caps and goals as of 24 June 2026 (UTC)

- Paik Seung-ho
- Hangul: 백승호
- Hanja: 白昇浩
- RR: Baek Seungho
- MR: Paek Sŭngho
- IPA: [pɛk̚.s͈ɯŋ.ɦo]

Paik Seung-ho (Korean: 백승호; born 17 March 1997) is a South Korean professional footballer who plays as a central midfielder for EFL Championship club Birmingham City and the South Korea national team.

== Early life ==
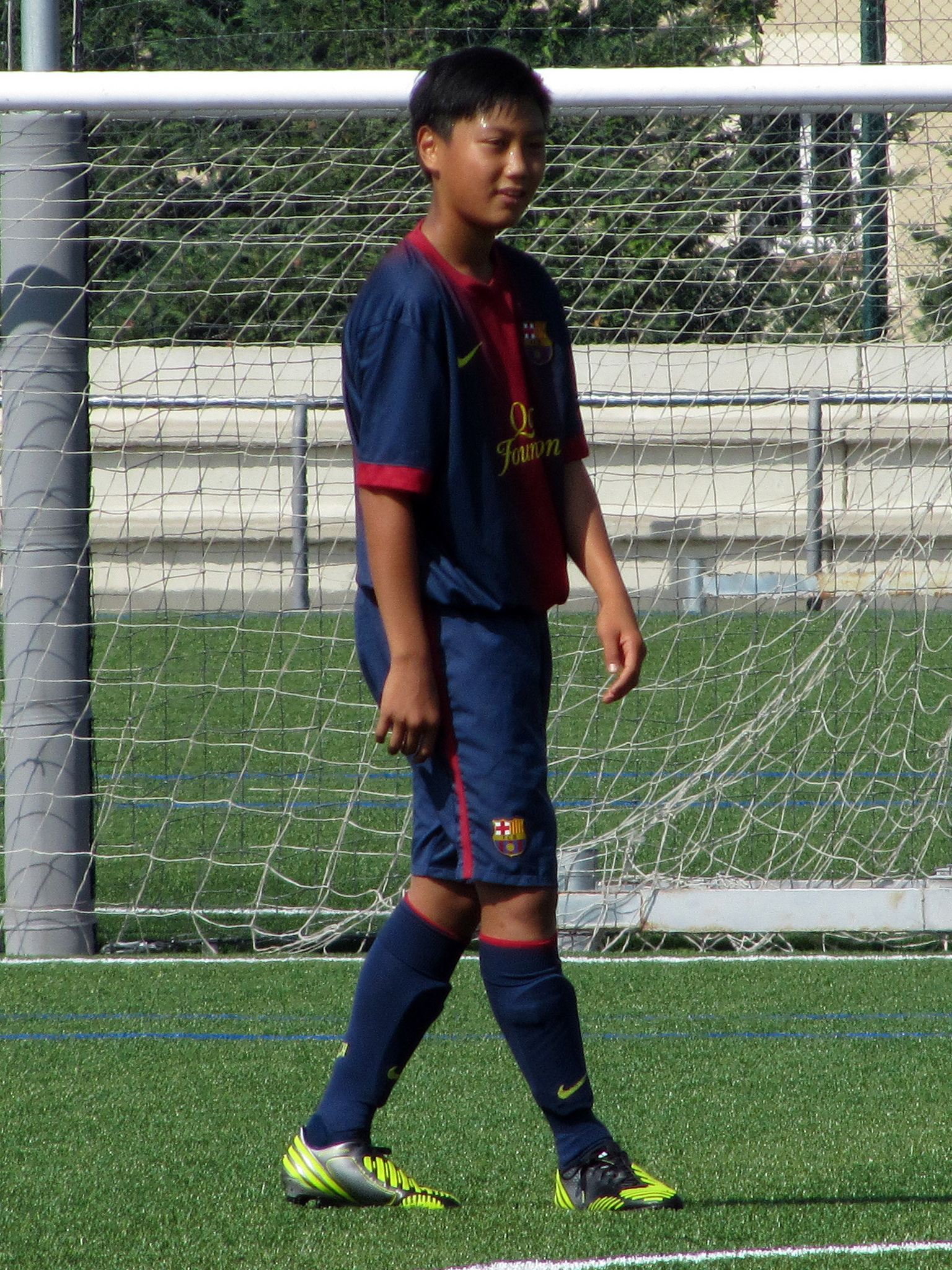
Paik in 2012

In 2009, as a member of Seoul Daedong Elementary School, he played 18 games in the Elementary Weekend League and scored 30 goals. Since then, he has received attention as an outstanding prospect, winning the 22nd Cha Bum-kun Football Grand Prize. In December, he participated in the 1st Korea-Catalonia Youth Cup in Barcelona, Spain as a member of the South Korean national under-14 football team, and was offered a contract as a result of his impressive performance. However, he was already scouted by Maetan Middle School, a youth team of Samsung Bluewings in Suwon, and was scheduled to enter, but Samsung Bluewings decided to send Paik to Spain with a long-term vision and also to support him.

Paik played for Maetan Middle School, the under-15 team of the Suwon Samsung Bluewings, until March 2010, before moving to Barcelona's under-13 team, Infantil A, in April 2010. In July 2011, Paik signed a five-year contract with Barcelona's youth team, leaving him in Barcelona's uniform until the age of 19. However, in February 2013, FIFA suspended six players, including Paik, from Barcelona's youth team, for violating Article 19 of the FIFA rules so he could not participate in Barcelona's official matches until January 2016, when the disciplinary action was released. He then played actively for Barcelona Juvenile A, and made his professional debut on 21 February, as a substitute in Segunda División B match with Atlético Levante in the 45th minute of the second half.

== Club career ==
=== Girona ===
Paik played for Barcelona as a youth player for seven years, but he had difficulty competing in the senior team. He joined Girona on 21 July 2017, and played for Peralada, the reserve team of Girona at the time, in the Segunda División B during his first professional season.

Paik made his first team debut against Atlético Madrid in the Copa del Rey on 10 January 2019. He made his La Liga debut as a substitute against Barcelona on 27 January. He officially played six matches for Girona excluding a Supercopa de Catalunya match.

=== Darmstadt 98 ===
On 31 August 2019, Paik signed for 2. Bundesliga side Darmstadt 98 on a three-year deal. He played for Darmstadt for one and a half years, but his status in the team was gradually lowered. He eventually considered a return to his country in order to get more appearances in the field and moreover participate in the 2020 Summer Olympics.

=== Jeonbuk Hyundai Motors ===
In March 2021, he signed for K League 1 club Jeonbuk Hyundai Motors. Within the three years of his career, he won the league and domestic cup titles, in 2021 and 2022 respectively.

=== Birmingham City ===
After the end of his three-year contract with Jeonbuk and his exemption from mandatory military service as an Asian Games gold medalist, Paik was expected to return to Europe. He joined EFL Championship club Birmingham City on 30 January 2024. On 4 May 2024, the final match day of the EFL Championship season, Paik scored his first goal for Birmingham in a 1–0 win over Norwich City, though the victory was not enough to save the team from relegation.

Paik remained at Birmingham the next season, playing at the EFL League One. His skills were assessed as being above League One level, and helped the club promote to the Championship easily. The club earned triple-digit points as they won the League One title, and he was one of their seven members to be selected for the PFA Team of the Year.

== International career ==
Paik made his South Korea national team debut on 11 June 2019 in a friendly against Iran, as a starter.

Paik played South Korea's round-of-16 match against Brazil as a substitute in the 2022 FIFA World Cup, and his goal in the match was nominated for goal of the tournament.

Paik participated in the 2022 Asian Games as an overage player, and captained South Korean under-24 team. He scored three goals with his powerful shots in the competition, but was criticised for his mistakes responsible for conceding goals to opponents in the knockout stage. Nevertheless, he successfully finished his role, winning a gold medal.

In March 2024, Paik received his first senior call-up for a year, for home-and-away 2026 World Cup qualifiers against Thailand. He started both matches, playing the whole of the home match, a 1–1 draw, and the first half of the away game, which South Korea won 3–0.

== Career statistics ==
=== Club ===
As of 22 November 2026.

Appearances and goals by club, season and competition
Club	Season	League			National cup (Note: Includes Copa del Rey, DFB-Pokal, Korean FA Cup, FA Cup)		League cup (Note: Includes EFL Cup)		Other		Total	
Club	Season	Division	Apps	Goals	Apps	Goals	Apps	Goals	Apps	Goals	Apps	Goals
Barcelona B	2015–16	Segunda División B	1	0	—		—		—		1	0
Barcelona B	2016–17	Segunda División B	1	0	—		—		—		1	0
Barcelona B	Total		2	0	—		—		—		2	0
Peralada	2017–18	Segunda División B	34	1	—		—		—		34	1
Peralada	2018–19	Segunda División B	21	1	—		—		—		21	1
Peralada	Total		55	2	—		—		—		55	2
Girona	2018–19	La Liga	3	0	3	0	—		—		6	0
Darmstadt 98	2019–20	2. Bundesliga	28	2	1	0	—		—		29	2
Darmstadt 98	2020–21	2. Bundesliga	13	0	3	1	—		—		16	1
Darmstadt 98	Total		41	2	4	1	—		—		45	3
Jeonbuk Hyundai Motors	2021	K League 1	25	4	1	0	—		7 (Note: Appearances in AFC Champions League)	0	33	4
Jeonbuk Hyundai Motors	2022	K League 1	30	2	5	0	—		5	1	40	3
Jeonbuk Hyundai Motors	2023	K League 1	27	3	3	1	—		3	0	33	4
Jeonbuk Hyundai Motors	Total		82	9	9	1	—		15	1	106	11
Birmingham City	2023–24	Championship	18	1	0	0	—		—		18	1
Birmingham City	2024–25	League One	41	1	3	0	2	0	4 (Note: Appearances in EFL Trophy)	0	50	1
Birmingham City	2025–26	Championship	43	4	1	0	2	0	—		46	4
Birmingham City	2026–27	Championship	10	1	0	0	2	0	—		12	1
Birmingham City	Total		112	7	4	0	6	0	4	0	126	7
Career total			295	20	20	2	6	0	19	1	340	23

=== International ===
As of match played 24 June 2026

Appearances and goals by national team and year
National team	Year	Apps	Goals
South Korea
South Korea	2019	3	0
South Korea	2021	1	0
South Korea	2022	11	3
South Korea	2023	0	0
South Korea	2024	5	0
South Korea	2025	3	0
South Korea	2026	7	0
Total		30	3

Scores and results list South Korea's goal tally first, score column lists the score after each Paik goal.

List of international goals scored by Paik Seung-ho
No.	Date	Venue	Opponent	Score	Result	Competition
1	15 January 2022	Mardan Sports Complex, Antalya, Turkey	Iceland	3–0	5–1	Friendly
2	21 January 2022	Mardan Sports Complex, Antalya, Turkey	Moldova	2–0	4–0	Friendly
3	5 December 2022	Stadium 974, Doha, Qatar	Brazil	1–4	1–4	2022 FIFA World Cup

== Honours ==
Jeonbuk Hyundai Motors

- K League 1: 2021
- Korean FA Cup: 2022

Birmingham City

- EFL League One: 2024–25
- EFL Trophy runner-up: 2024–25

South Korea U23

- Asian Games: 2022

South Korea

- EAFF Championship runner-up: 2022

Individual

- K League Goal of the Month: June 2021, September 2021
- K League All-Star: 2022, 2023
- K League Player of the Month: May 2023
- PFA League One Team of the Year: 2024–25
