= Jeong Tae-wook =

South Korean footballer (born 1997)

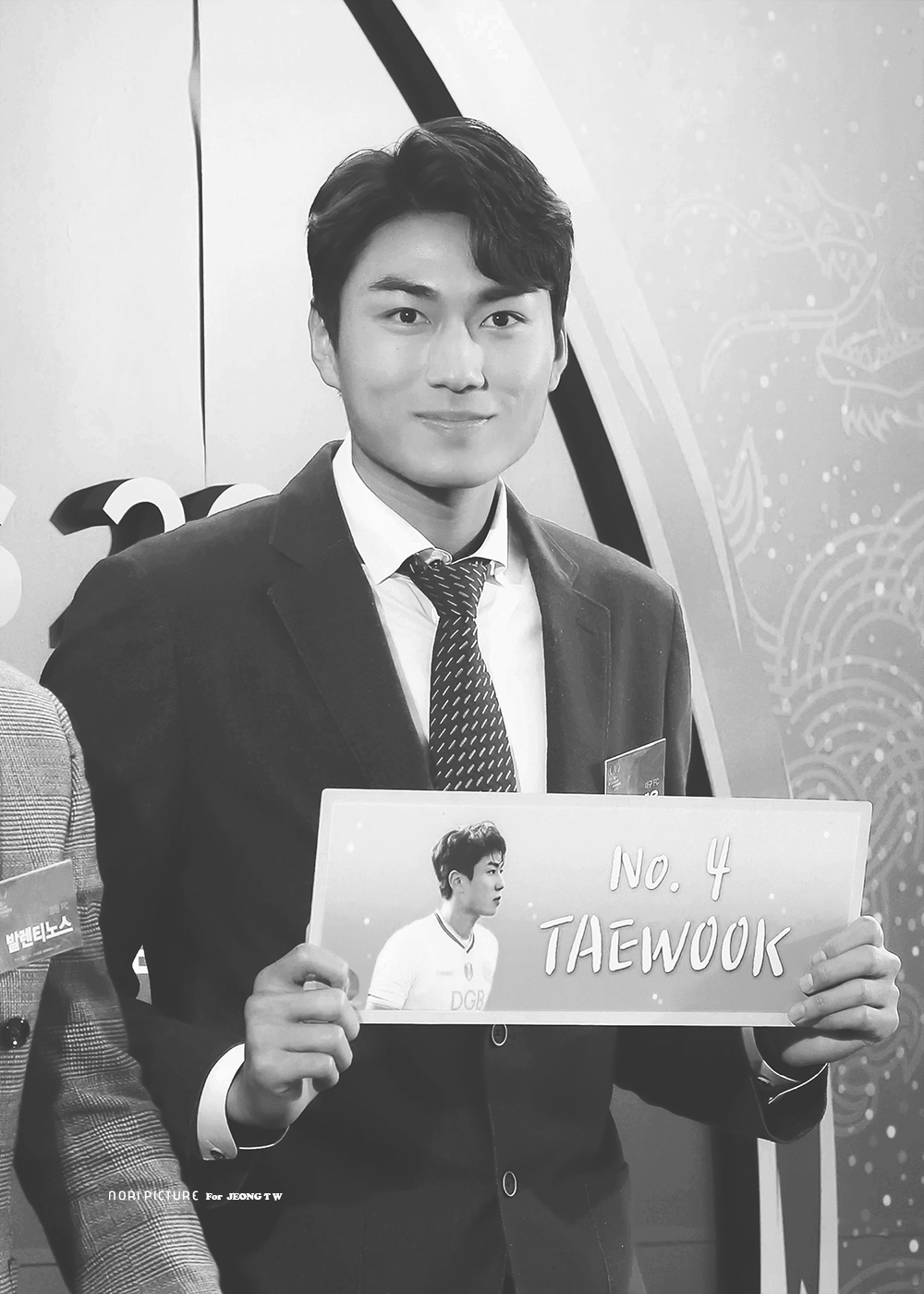

Personal information
- Full name: Jeong Tae-wook
- Date of birth: 16 May 1997 (age 29)
- Place of birth: Seongnam, South Korea
- Height: 1.95 m (6 ft 5 in)
- Position: Centre-back

Team information
- Current team: Incheon United
- Number: 25

Youth career
- 2013–2016: Jeju Jeil High School
- 2016–2018: Ajou University

Senior career*
Years	Team	Apps	(Gls)
2018	Jeju United	5	(0)
2019–2022	Daegu FC	123	(4)
2023–2025	Jeonbuk Hyundai Motors	45	(1)
2024–2025	→ Western Sydney Wanderers (loan)	5	(0)
2025	→ FC Seoul (loan)	2	(0)
2026-	Incheon United	0	(0)

International career^{‡}
2015–2017	South Korea U20	22	(5)
2017–2021	South Korea U23	23 (Note: Includes two appearances against another KFA team.)	(2)
2017	South Korea Universiade	4	(1)
Medal record
Representing South Korea
Men's football
Asian Games
Gold medal – first place	2018 Jakarta-Palembang	Team
AFC U-23 Championship
Gold medal – first place	2020 Thailand
- * Club domestic league appearances and goals as of 25 December 2025 ‡ National team caps and goals as of 31 July 2021

- Jeong Tae-wook
- Hangul: 정태욱
- Hanja: 鄭泰旭
- RR: Jeong Taeuk
- MR: Chŏng T'aeuk

Jeong Tae-wook (Korean: 정태욱; born 16 May 1997) is a South Korean footballer who plays as a centre-back for Korean K League 1 club FC Seoul on loan from K League 1 club Jeonbuk Hyundai Motors.

== Career ==
Jeong started his career with Jeju United. Jeong Taewook then transferred to Daegu FC after spending a year with Jeju United. After a successful run at Daegu FC for 4 years, Jeong was sold to Jeonbuk Hyundai Motors in January 2023. Jeong has since had 39 appearances and 1 goal for the club

== Club career statistics ==
As of 23 November 2024

Club performance			League		Cup		Continental		Total	
Season	Club	League	Apps	Goals	Apps	Goals	Apps	Goals	Apps	Goals
South Korea			League		KFA Cup		Asia		Total	
2018	Jeju United	K League 1	5	0	1	0	1	0	7	0
2019	Daegu FC	K League 1	27	1	0	0	3	1	30	2
2020	Daegu FC	K League 1	27	1	1	0	—		28	1
2021	Daegu FC	K League 1	33	1	4	0	1	0	38	1
2022	Daegu FC	K League 1	36	1	2	1	6	0	44	2
2023	Jeonbuk Hyundai Motors	K League 1	31	1	3	0	4	0	38	1
2024	Jeonbuk Hyundai Motors	K League 1	14	0	0	0	3	1	17	1
2024–25	Western Sydney Wanderers (loan)	A-League	5	0	2	0	0	0	7	0
2025	FC Seoul (loan)	K League 1	0	0	0	0	0	0	0	0
Career total			178	5	13	1	18	2	209	8

== Honours ==
=== International ===
Jeong made his international debut during the 2017 FIFA U-20 World Cup in South Korea.

Jeong was then selected to represent South Korea at the 2018 Asian Games. South Korea emerged as champions in the 2018 Asian Games after beating arch-rivals Japan 2-1 in extra time during the finals, winning them the gold medal.

Jeong was also named in the AFC U-23 Championship Thailand 2020 squad. South Korea won the championship after beating Saudi Arabia in the finals. Jeong was named Man of the Match after scoring the winning goal during the finals. He was selected as one of the Best 11 for the tournament.

In 2021, Jeong Taewook was named in the 22-man squad for the 2020 Tokyo Olympics. Jeong Taewook was selected as captain for the tournament and helped lead the team to the competition's quarter-finals. However, South Korea's journey ended there as they lost 6-3 to Mexico.

- FIFA U-20 World Cup: 2017
- Asian Games: 2018
- AFC U-23 Championship: 2020
- Tokyo Olympics: 2020
