= Oh Jae-hyeok =

South Korean footballer (born 2002)

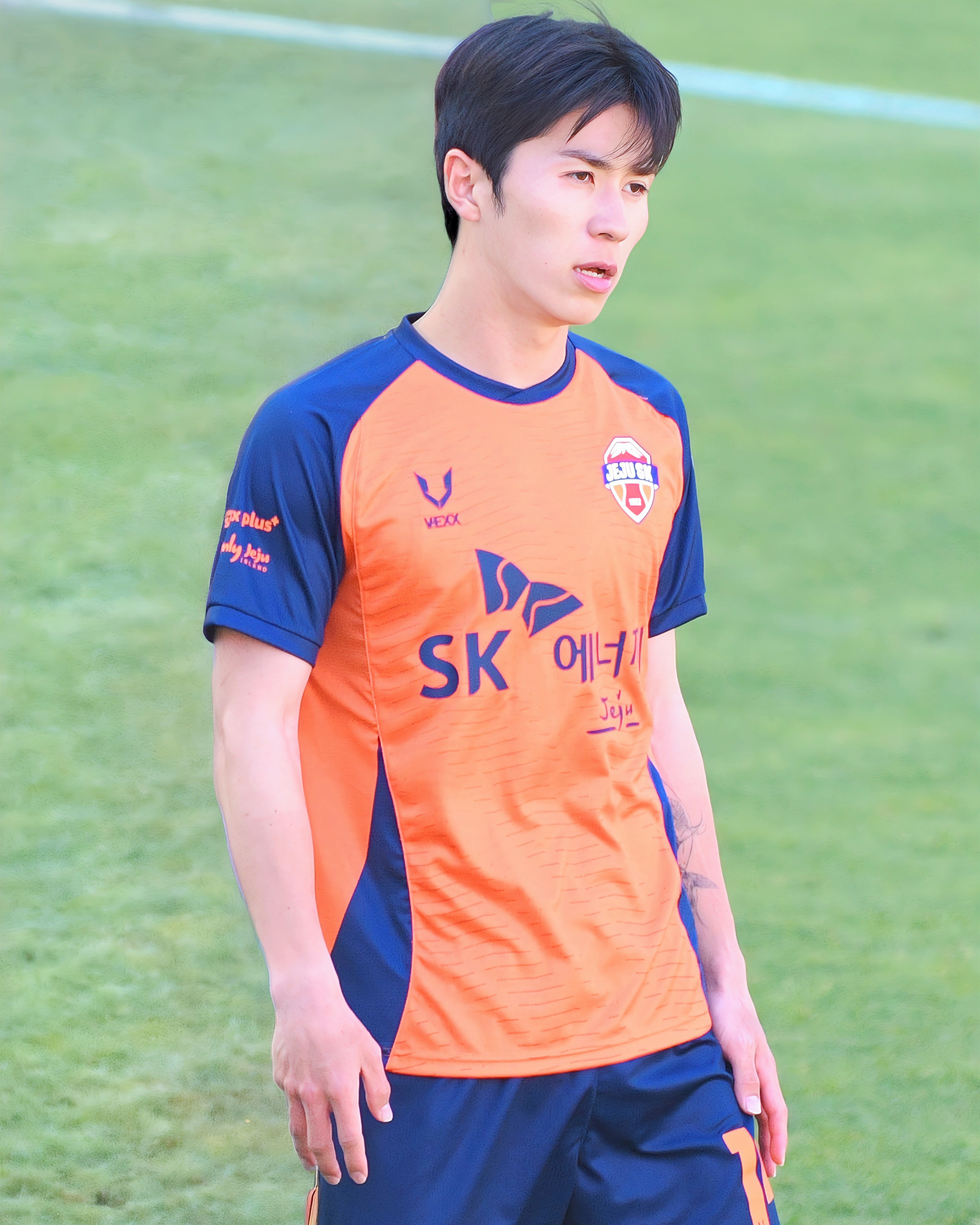
- Oh in 2026

Personal information
- Full name: Oh Jae-hyeok
- Date of birth: 21 June 2002 (age 24)
- Place of birth: South Korea
- Height: 1.70 m (5 ft 7 in)
- Position: Midfielder

Team information
- Current team: Jeju SK
- Number: 18

Youth career
- 2012–2014: Gimhae Oedong Elementary School
- 2015–2021: Pohang Steelers

Senior career*
Years	Team	Apps	(Gls)
2021	Pohang Steelers	0	(0)
2021	→ Bucheon FC 1995 (loan)	17	(0)
2022	Bucheon FC 1995	33	(2)
2023	Jeonbuk Hyundai Motors	4	(0)
2024	Seongnam FC (loan)	12	(0)
2025–	Jeju SK FC	31	(1)

International career^{‡}
2019	South Korea U17	5	(0)
2022–	South Korea U23	4	(1)
- * Club domestic league appearances and goals as of 5 January 2026 ‡ National team caps and goals as of 14:18, 12 September 2023 (UTC)

- Oh Jae-hyeok
- Hangul: 오재혁
- Hanja: 吳宰奕
- RR: O Jaehyeok
- MR: O Chaehyŏk

Oh Jae-hyeok (Korean: 오재혁; born 21 June 2002) is a South Korean footballer currently playing as a midfielder for Jeju SK FC.

== Early life ==
Oh Jae-hyeok was born in South Korea. He played for the youth side of Pohang Steelers before joining their first team in 2021.

== Career ==
Oh started his career with Pohang, before being loaned out to Bucheon FC 1995, before joining them permanently. He then joined Jeonbuk Hyundai Motors in 2023.

== International career ==
Oh was called up to the South Korea under 17 side in 2019, and has played 5 times in total for the side. In 2022, he was called up to the South Korea under 23s side, making 4 appearances in total, scoring 1 goal.

== Career statistics ==
=== Club ===
As of 7 June 2023.

Club	Season	League			Cup		Continental		Other		Total	
Club	Season	Division	Apps	Goals	Apps	Goals	Apps	Goals	Apps	Goals	Apps	Goals
Pohang Steelers	2021	K League 1	0	0	0	0	0	0	0	0	0	0
Bucheon FC 1995 (loan)	2021	K League 2	17	0	2	0	–		0	0	19	0
Bucheon FC 1995	2022	K League 2	33	2	2	0	–		0	0	35	2
Jeonbuk Hyundai Motors	2023	K League 1	4	0	0	0	–		0	0	4	0
Career total			54	2	4	0	0	0	0	0	58	2
