= Jeong Min-ki =

South Korean footballer (born 1996)

Personal information
- Date of birth: 9 February 1996 (age 30)
- Place of birth: South Korea
- Height: 1.90 m (6 ft 3 in)
- Position: Goalkeeper

Team information
- Current team: Suwon FC
- Number: 13

Youth career
- 2012–2013: Sekyeong High School
- 2014: Sekyeong FC

College career
Years	Team	Apps	(Gls)
2015–2017	Chung-Ang University	29	(0)

Senior career*
Years	Team	Apps	(Gls)
2018–2022	FC Anyang	95	(0)
2023–2024	Jeonbuk Hyundai Motors	28	(0)
2024–	Suwon FC	4	(0)
2025	→ Sanfrecce Hiroshima (loan)	0	(0)
- * Club domestic league appearances and goals as of 5 August 2026

Jeong Min-ki (Korean: 정민기; born 9 February 1996) is a South Korean professional footballer who plays as a goalkeeper for Suwon FC.

== Club career ==
=== FC Anyang ===
Jeong joined FC Anyang ahead of the 2018 K League 2 season, making his professional debut. His contract was for one year. He signed a one-year extension with FC Anyang ahead of the 2019 season. With Anyang's starting goalkeeper Yang Dong-won injured in July, he seized the opportunity to play, appearing in two consecutive matches against Asan Mugunghwa and Gwangju FC. Anyang won 4-1 and 7-1, respectively. He signed a one-year extension with FC Anyang ahead of the 2020 season.

=== Jeonbuk Hyundai Motors ===
Jeong transferred to Jeonbuk Hyundai Motors ahead of the 2023 season to replace Song Bum-keun, who left for Japan.

=== Suwon FC and Sanfrecce Hiroshima ===
On 6 February 2025, it was announced that Jeong would join Sanfrecce Hiroshima on loan.

On 4 June 2025, in the absence of starting goalkeeper Keisuke Osako due to Japan national team call-up, Jeong started in the first leg of the 2025 J.League Cup playoff round against Avispa Fukuoka. Although the team lost 0-1, it was his first official appearance since the transfer. He continued to start in the second leg at home on 8 June, and although the game ended 2-2 on aggregate, he saved a penalty kick by Wellington, the fifth kicker, to lead the team to the quarterfinals, and was named Man of the Match for that match.

== Personal life ==
Jeong's father, Jeong Sung-jin, was appointed goalkeeper coach for the South Korea national team under manager Cha Bum-kun in February 1997 and accompanied the team to the 1998 FIFA World Cup as part of the coaching staff. His older brother is an employee of Ulsan HD FC.

== Honours ==
Sanfrecce Hiroshima

- J.League Cup: 2025
