= Ku Ja-ryong =

South Korean footballer

Personal information
- Full name: Ku Ja-ryong
- Date of birth: 6 April 1992 (age 34)
- Place of birth: Wanju County, South Korea
- Height: 1.83 m (6 ft 0 in)
- Position: Centre back

Youth career
- 2008–2010: Suwon Samsung Bluewings U-18

Senior career*
Years	Team	Apps	(Gls)
2011–2019	Suwon Samsung Bluewings	148	(2)
2012–2013	→ Ansan Police (army)	6	(0)
2020–2025	Jeonbuk Hyundai Motors	70	(1)
2025	Bucheon FC 1995	7	(0)
2025–2026	Eastern	7	(1)

International career^{‡}
2014	South Korea U-23	1	(0)
- * Club domestic league appearances and goals as of 17 May 2026 ‡ National team caps and goals as of 1 November 2015

- Ku Ja-ryong
- Hangul: 구자룡
- Hanja: 具滋龍
- RR: Gu Jaryong
- MR: Ku Charyong

Ku Ja-ryong (Korean: 구자룡; Hanja: 具滋龍; born 6 April 1992) is a South Korean professional footballer who plays as a centre back.

== Early life ==
Ku was born in Wanju.

== Club career ==
In 2011, Ku joined Suwon Samsung Bluewings.

In 2012, Ku transferred to Ansan Police on loan to complete his military service as per South Korean law. He made his league debut for the club on 12 May 2013 against Chungju Hummel.

In September 2013, Ku returned to Suwon Samsung Bluewings.

On 22 July 2025, Ku joined Hong Kong Premier League club Eastern.

== Career statistics ==
=== Club ===
Club performance			League		Cup		League Cup		continental		Total	
Season	Club	League	Apps	Goals	Apps	Goals	Apps	Goals	Apps	Goals	Apps	Goals
South Korea			League		KFA Cup		Korean League Cup		Asia		Total	
2011	Suwon Samsung Bluewings	K League 1	0	0	1	0	0	0	0	0	1	0
2013	Ansan Police	K League 2	6	0	0	0	—		—		6	0
2013	Suwon Samsung Bluewings	K League 1	3	0	0	0	—		0	0	3	0
2014	Suwon Samsung Bluewings	K League 1	7	0	0	0	—		—		7	0
2015	Suwon Samsung Bluewings	K League 1	25	0	0	0	—		3	1	28	1
2016	Suwon Samsung Bluewings	K League 1	32	1	4	0	—		4	0	40	1
2017	Suwon Samsung Bluewings	K League 1	29	0	3	0	—		4	0	36	0
2018	Suwon Samsung Bluewings	K League 1	22	0	2	0	—		9	0	33	0
2019	Suwon Samsung Bluewings	K League 1	30	1	6	0	—		—		36	1
2020	Jeonbuk Hyundai	K League 1	2	0	3	0	—		4	0	9	0
2021	Jeonbuk Hyundai	K League 1	17	0	1	0	—		5	0	23	0
2022	Jeonbuk Hyundai	K League 1	15	1	1	0	—		2	0	18	1
Total	South Korea		188	3	21	0	0	0	31	1	240	4
Career total			188	3	21	0	0	0	31	1	240	3

== Honours ==
=== Suwon Samsung Bluewings ===
- K League 1 Runners-up(1): 2014
