= Lee Sung-yoon (footballer) =

South Korean footballer (born 2000)

Personal information
- Full name: Lee Sung-yoon
- Date of birth: 31 October 2000 (age 26)
- Place of birth: South Korea
- Height: 1.85 m (6 ft 1 in)
- Position: Midfielder

Youth career
- –2020: Jeonbuk Hyundai Motors

Senior career*
Years	Team	Apps	(Gls)
2020–2023	Jeonbuk Hyundai Motors	15	(2)
2022	→ Seoul E-Land FC (loan)	8	(1)
- * Club domestic league appearances and goals as of 2:59, 20 October 2023

- Lee Sung-yoon
- Hangul: 이성윤
- RR: I Seongyun
- MR: I Sŏngyun

Lee Sung-yoon (Korean: 이성윤; born 31 October 2000) is a South Korean footballer currently playing as a midfielder.

== Early life ==
Lee was born in South Korea.

== Career ==
Lee scored his first goal for Jeonbuk on 23 August 2020, scoring in the 3rd minute to open the scoring against Gimcheon Sangmu.

Lee joined Seoul E-Land on loan in 2022.

== Career statistics ==
=== Club ===
As of 12 March 2022.

Club	Season	League			Cup		Continental		Other		Total	
Club	Season	Division	Apps	Goals	Apps	Goals	Apps	Goals	Apps	Goals	Apps	Goals
Jeonbuk Hyundai Motors	2020	K League 1	5	1	0	0	1 (Note: Appearances in the AFC Champions League)	0	0	0	6	1
Jeonbuk Hyundai Motors	2021	K League 1	10	1	0	0	3	0	0	0	13	1
Seoul E-Land FC	2022	K League 2	2	1	1	0	-		0	0	3	1
Career total			17	3	1	0	4	0	0	0	22	3
