= 2020 AFC U-23 Championship =

International football championship

ฟุตบอลชิงชนะเลิศแห่งเอเชีย รุ่นอายุไม่เกิน 23 ปี 2020

Tournament details
- Host country: Thailand
- Dates: 8–26 January
- Teams: 16 (from 1 confederation)
- Venue: 4 (in 4 host cities)

Final positions
- Champions: South Korea (1st title)
- Runners-up: Saudi Arabia
- Third place: Australia
- Fourth place: Uzbekistan

Tournament statistics
- Matches played: 32
- Goals scored: 69 (2.16 per match)
- Attendance: 107,402 (3,356 per match)
- Top scorer(s): (Australia) Nicholas D'Agostino (Iraq) Mohammed Nassif (Thailand) Jaroensak Wonggorn (Note: Playing fewer minutes than the other players scoring 3 goals, Wonggorn won the Top Scorer Award) (United Arab Emirates) Zaid Al-Ameri (Uzbekistan) Islom Kobilov (3 goals each)
- Best player: (South Korea) Won Du-jae
- Best goalkeeper: (South Korea) Song Bum-keun
- Fair play award: Saudi Arabia

The 2020 AFC U-23 Championship was the fourth edition of the AFC U-23 Championship, the biennial international age-restricted men's football championship organised by the Asian Football Confederation (AFC) for under-23 national teams. A total of 16 teams competed in the tournament. It took place between 8–26 January 2020 in Thailand.

The tournament acted as the AFC qualifiers for the 2020 Summer Olympics men's football tournament. The top three teams of the tournament would qualify for the Olympics in Japan as the AFC representatives. As Japan had already qualified as the hosts, had they reached the semi-finals, the other semi-finalists were guaranteed qualification even before the phase would have commenced.

Uzbekistan were the defending champions, but were eliminated in the semi-finals. South Korea became the fourth different country to win the tournament, beating Saudi Arabia in the final, while Australia defeated Uzbekistan in the third place game 1–0.

== Host selection ==
Several nations expressed interest to host the tournament, including Australia, Malaysia, Thailand and Vietnam. Thailand were selected as host of the competition at an AFC Competition Committee's meeting in Tokyo in August 2018.

== Qualification ==
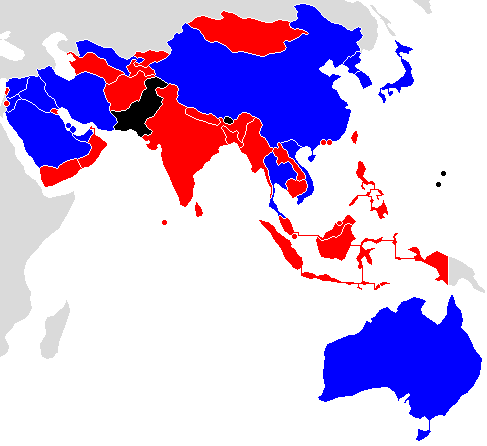
Qualified for AFC U23 Championship Failed to qualify Withdrew or did not participate Not an AFC member

The qualifiers were held from 18 to 26 March 2019, during the FIFA International Match Calendar.

=== Qualified teams ===
Thirteen of the sixteen teams (including hosts Thailand) that qualified for 2018 AFC U-23 Championship qualified again for the 2020 final tournament. The 2013 champions Iraq, 2016 champions Japan, 2018 champions Uzbekistan all qualified for the 2020 final tournament. The teams: Iraq, Japan, Uzbekistan, Jordan, Syria, Saudi Arabia, North Korea, South Korea, China PR, Australia qualified for all editions of AFC U-23 Championship till 2020.

Iran, United Arab Emirates come back after missing out in 2018, with Bahrain making their debut at the tournament finals.

The following 16 teams qualified for the final tournament.

| Team | Qualified as | Appearance | Previous best performance |
|---|---|---|---|
| Thailand | Hosts | 3rd | Group stage (2016, 2018) |
| Qatar | Group A winners | 3rd | Third place (2018) |
| Bahrain | Group B winners | 1st | Debut |
| Iraq | Group C winners | 4th | Champions (2013) |
| United Arab Emirates | Group D winners | 3rd | Quarter-finals (2013, 2016) |
| Jordan | Group E winners | 4th | Third place (2013) |
| Uzbekistan | Group F winners | 4th | Champions (2018) |
| North Korea | Group G winners | 4th | Quarter-finals (2016) |
| South Korea | Group H winners | 4th | Runners-up (2016) |
| Japan | Group I winners | 4th | Champions (2016) |
| China | Group J winners | 4th | Group stage (2013, 2016, 2018) |
| Vietnam | Group K winners | 3rd | Runners-up (2018) |
| Australia | Group H runners-up (Note: The four best runners-up qualified for the final tournament.) | 4th | Quarter-finals (2013) |
| Iran | Group C runners-up | 3rd | Quarter-finals (2016) |
| Syria | Group E runners-up | 4th | Quarter-finals (2013) |
| Saudi Arabia | Group D runners-up | 4th | Runners-up (2013) |

== Venues ==
The competition was played in four venues across four cities/provinces.

| Bangkok | 2020 AFC U-23 Championship is located in Thailand | Buriram |
|---|---|---|
| Rajamangala Stadium | 2020 AFC U-23 Championship is located in Thailand | Buriram Stadium |
| Capacity: 49,722 | 2020 AFC U-23 Championship is located in Thailand | Capacity: 32,600 |
| Songkhla | 2020 AFC U-23 Championship is located in Thailand | Pathum Thani |
| Tinsulanon Stadium | 2020 AFC U-23 Championship is located in Thailand | Thammasat Stadium |
| Capacity: 45,000 | 2020 AFC U-23 Championship is located in Thailand | Capacity: 25,000 |

== Draw ==
The draw of the final tournament was held on 26 September 2019, 15:00 ICT (UTC+7), at the Swissotel Bangkok Ratchada in Bangkok. The 16 teams were drawn into four groups of four teams. The teams were seeded according to their performance in the 2018 AFC U-23 Championship final tournament and qualification, with the hosts Thailand automatically seeded and assigned to Position A1 in the draw.

| Pot 1 | Pot 2 | Pot 3 | Pot 4 |
|---|---|---|---|
| 1. Thailand (hosts); 2. Uzbekistan; 3. Vietnam; 4. Qatar | 5. South Korea; 6. Iraq; 7. Japan; 8. North Korea | 9. China; 10. Australia; 11. Jordan; 12. Saudi Arabia | 13. Syria; 14. Iran; 15. United Arab Emirates; 16. Bahrain |

== Match officials ==
On 3 January 2020, the AFC announced the list of referees chosen for the 2020 AFC U-23 Championship. 34 referees, 26 assistant referees and 2 support assistant referees were appointed for the tournament. Video assistant referees will be used in this tournament.

Referees

- (Australia) Chris Beath
- (Australia) Shaun Evans
- (Bahrain) Nawaf Shukralla
- (China) Fu Ming
- (China) Ma Ning
- (Hong Kong) Liu Kwok Man
- (Iran) Alireza Faghani
- (Iraq) Ali Sabah
- (Iraq) Mohanad Qasim Sarray
- (Japan) Jumpei Iida
- (Japan) Hiroyuki Kimura
- (Japan) Ryuji Sato
- (Japan) Minoru Tōjō
- (Jordan) Adham Makhadmeh
- (Jordan) Ahmad Faisal Al-Ali
- (South Korea) Kim Hee-gon
- (South Korea) Kim Jong-hyeok
- (South Korea) Ko Hyung-jin
- (Malaysia) Mohd Amirul Izwan Yaacob
- (Oman) Ahmed Al-Kaf
- (Qatar) Abdulla Al-Marri
- (Qatar) Abdulrahman Al-Jassim
- (Qatar) Khamis Al-Kuwari
- (Qatar) Khamis Al-Marri
- (Saudi Arabia) Turki Al-Khudhayr
- (Singapore) Muhammad Taqi
- (Sri Lanka) Hettikamkanamge Perera
- (Syria) Hanna Hattab
- (Thailand) Sivakorn Pu-udom
- (United Arab Emirates) Ammar Al-Jeneibi
- (United Arab Emirates) Mohammed Abdulla Hassan Mohamed
- (United Arab Emirates) Omar Mohamed Al-Ali
- (Uzbekistan) Valentin Kovalenko
- (Uzbekistan) Ilgiz Tantashev

Assistant referees

- (Australia) Anton Shchetinin
- (Australia) Ashley Beecham
- (Bahrain) Mohamed Salman
- (Bahrain) Abdulla Al-Rowaimi
- (China) Cao Yi
- (China) Shi Xiang
- (Iran) Mohammadreza Abolfazl
- (Iran) Mohammadreza Mansouri
- (Jordan) Ahmad Al-Roalle
- (Jordan) Mohammad Al-Kalaf
- (Japan) Jun Mihara
- (Japan) Hiroshi Yamauchi
- (South Korea) Park Sang-jun
- (South Korea) Yoon Kwang-yeol
- (Oman) Abu Bakar Al-Amri
- (Oman) Rashid Al-Ghaithi
- (Qatar) Saud Al-Maqaleh
- (Qatar) Taleb Al-Marri
- (Saudi Arabia) Mohammed Al-Abakri
- (Saudi Arabia) Khalaf Al-Shammari
- (Singapore) Ronnie Koh Min Kiat
- (Sri Lanka) Palitha Hemathunga
- (United Arab Emirates) Mohammed Al-Hammadi
- (United Arab Emirates) Hasan Al-Mahri
- (Uzbekistan) Timur Gaynullin
- (Uzbekistan) Andrey Tsapenko

Support assistant referees

- (Malaysia) Mohd Yusri Muhamad
- (Thailand) Rawut Nakarit

== Squads ==
Players born on or after 1 January 1997 were eligible to compete in the tournament. Each team had to register a squad of minimum 18 players and maximum 23 players, minimum three of whom must have been goalkeepers (Regulations Articles 24.1 and 24.2).

== Group stage ==
The top two teams of each group advanced to the quarter-finals.

Tiebreakers

Teams are ranked according to points (3 points for a win, 1 point for a draw, 0 points for a loss), and if tied on points, the following tiebreaking criteria are applied, in the order given, to determine the rankings (Regulations Article 9.3):

1. Points in head-to-head matches among tied teams;
2. Goal difference in head-to-head matches among tied teams;
3. Goals scored in head-to-head matches among tied teams;
4. If more than two teams are tied, and after applying all head-to-head criteria above, a subset of teams are still tied, all head-to-head criteria above are reapplied exclusively to this subset of teams;
5. Goal difference in all group matches;
6. Goals scored in all group matches;
7. Penalty shoot-out if only two teams are tied and they met in the last round of the group;
8. Disciplinary points (yellow card = 1 point, red card as a result of two yellow cards = 3 points, direct red card = 3 points, yellow card followed by direct red card = 4 points);
9. Drawing of lots.

All times are local, ICT (UTC+7).

Schedule
| Matchday | Dates | Matches |
|---|---|---|
| Matchday 1 | 8–10 January 2020 | 1 v 4, 2 v 3 |
| Matchday 2 | 11–13 January 2020 | 4 v 2, 3 v 1 |
| Matchday 3 | 14–16 January 2020 | 1 v 2, 3 v 4 |

=== Group A ===
| Pos | Team | Pld | W | D | L | GF | GA | GD | Pts | Qualification |
|---|---|---|---|---|---|---|---|---|---|---|
| 1 | Australia | 3 | 1 | 2 | 0 | 4 | 3 | +1 | 5 | Knockout stage |
| 2 | Thailand (H) | 3 | 1 | 1 | 1 | 7 | 3 | +4 | 4 | Knockout stage |
| 3 | Iraq | 3 | 0 | 3 | 0 | 4 | 4 | 0 | 3 | |
| 4 | Bahrain | 3 | 0 | 2 | 1 | 3 | 8 | −5 | 2 | |

Source: AFC
Rules for classification: Group stage tiebreakers
(H) Hosts
8 January 2020
17:15

| Iraq | 1–1 | Australia |
|---|---|---|
| Nassif 77' | Live Report; Stats Report | Piscopo 62' |

Thammasat Stadium, Pathum Thani
Attendance: 106
Referee: Fu Ming (China PR)
8 January 2020
20:15

| Thailand | 5–0 | Bahrain |
|---|---|---|
| Suphanat 12', 79'; Supachok 47'; Jaroensak 89', 90+2' | Live Report; Stats Report |

Rajamangala Stadium, Bangkok
Attendance: 7,076
Referee: Ryuji Sato (Japan)

11 January 2020
17:15

| Bahrain | 2–2 | Iraq |
|---|---|---|
| Isa 44'; Marhoon 86' | Live Report; Stats Report | Al-Ammari 65'; Nassif 90+2' |

Thammasat Stadium, Pathum Thani
Attendance: 112
Referee: Ko Hyung-jin (South Korea)
11 January 2020
20:15

| Australia | 2–1 | Thailand |
|---|---|---|
| D'Agostino 43', 76' | Live Report; Stats Report | Anon 24' |

Rajamangala Stadium, Bangkok
Attendance: 22,352
Referee: Turki Al-Khudhayr (Saudi Arabia)

14 January 2020
20:15

| Thailand | 1–1 | Iraq |
|---|---|---|
| Jaroensak 6' (pen.) | Live Report; Stats Report | Nassif 49' |

Rajamangala Stadium, Bangkok
Attendance: 15,342
Referee: Adham Makhadmeh (Jordan)
14 January 2020
20:15

| Australia | 1–1 | Bahrain |
|---|---|---|
| Najjarine 34' | Live Report; Stats Report | Marhoon 45+3' |

Thammasat Stadium, Pathum Thani
Attendance: 123
Referee: Mohammed Abdulla Hassan Mohamed (United Arab Emirates)

=== Group B ===
| Pos | Team | Pld | W | D | L | GF | GA | GD | Pts | Qualification |
|---|---|---|---|---|---|---|---|---|---|---|
| 1 | Saudi Arabia | 3 | 2 | 1 | 0 | 3 | 1 | +2 | 7 | Knockout stage |
| 2 | Syria | 3 | 1 | 1 | 1 | 4 | 4 | 0 | 4 | Knockout stage |
| 3 | Qatar | 3 | 0 | 3 | 0 | 3 | 3 | 0 | 3 | |
| 4 | Japan | 3 | 0 | 1 | 2 | 3 | 5 | −2 | 1 | |

Source: AFC
Rules for classification: Group stage tiebreakers
9 January 2020
17:15

| Qatar | 2–2 | Syria |
|---|---|---|
| Abdurisag 1'; Yousef 22' (o.g.) | Live Report; Stats Report | Barakat 31'; Dali 90+4' |

Thammasat Stadium, Pathum Thani
Attendance: 750
Referee: Ilgiz Tantashev (Uzbekistan)
9 January 2020
20:15

| Japan | 1–2 | Saudi Arabia |
|---|---|---|
| Meshino 56' | Live Report; Stats Report | Al-Khulaif 48'; Ghareeb 88' (pen.) |

Thammasat Stadium, Pathum Thani
Attendance: 1,433
Referee: Chris Beath (Australia)

12 January 2020
17:15

| Saudi Arabia | 0–0 | Qatar |
|---|---|---|
| | Live Report; Stats Report |

Thammasat Stadium, Pathum Thani
Attendance: 150
Referee: Ma Ning (China PR)
12 January 2020
20:15

| Syria | 2–1 | Japan |
|---|---|---|
| Barakat 9' (pen.); Dali 88' | Live Report; Stats Report | Soma 30' |

Thammasat Stadium, Pathum Thani
Attendance: 1,509
Referee: Ali Sabah (Iraq)

15 January 2020
20:15

| Qatar | 1–1 | Japan |
|---|---|---|
| Al-Ahrak 79' (pen.) | Live Report; Stats Report | Ogawa 73' |

Rajamangala Stadium, Bangkok
Attendance: 1,362
Referee: Muhammad Taqi (Singapore)
15 January 2020
20:15

| Saudi Arabia | 1–0 | Syria |
|---|---|---|
| Al-Buraikan 80' | Live Report; Stats Report |

Thammasat Stadium, Pathum Thani
Attendance: 87
Referee: Hettikamkanamge Perera (Sri Lanka)

=== Group C ===
| Pos | Team | Pld | W | D | L | GF | GA | GD | Pts | Qualification |
|---|---|---|---|---|---|---|---|---|---|---|
| 1 | South Korea | 3 | 3 | 0 | 0 | 5 | 2 | +3 | 9 | Knockout stage |
| 2 | Uzbekistan | 3 | 1 | 1 | 1 | 4 | 3 | +1 | 4 | Knockout stage |
| 3 | Iran | 3 | 1 | 1 | 1 | 3 | 3 | 0 | 4 | |
| 4 | China | 3 | 0 | 0 | 3 | 0 | 4 | −4 | 0 | |

Source: AFC
Rules for classification: Group stage tiebreakers
9 January 2020
17:15

| Uzbekistan | 1–1 | Iran |
|---|---|---|
| Kobilov 40' (pen.) | Live Report; Stats Report | Dehghani 58' |

Tinsulanon Stadium, Songkhla
Attendance: 4,180
Referee: Khamis Al-Marri (Qatar)
9 January 2020
20:15

| South Korea | 1–0 | China |
|---|---|---|
| Lee Dong-jun 90+3' | Live Report; Stats Report |

Tinsulanon Stadium, Songkhla
Attendance: 6,000
Referee: Mohammed Abdulla Hassan Mohamed (United Arab Emirates)

12 January 2020
17:15

| Iran | 1–2 | South Korea |
|---|---|---|
| Shekari 54' | Live Report; Stats Report | Lee Dong-jun 22'; Cho Gue-sung 35' |

Tinsulanon Stadium, Songkhla
Attendance: 6,000
Referee: Adham Makhadmeh (Jordan)
12 January 2020
20:15

| China | 0–2 | Uzbekistan |
|---|---|---|
| | Live Report; Stats Report | Kobilov 45+3' (pen.); Tukhtasinov 80' |

Tinsulanon Stadium, Songkhla
Attendance: 6,683
Referee: Abdulrahman Al-Jassim (Qatar)

15 January 2020
17:15

| Uzbekistan | 1–2 | South Korea |
|---|---|---|
| Abdikholikov 21' | Live Report; Stats Report | Oh Se-hun 5', 71' |

Thammasat Stadium, Pathum Thani
Attendance: 606
Referee: Hiroyuki Kimura (Japan)
15 January 2020
17:15

| China | 0–1 | Iran |
|---|---|---|
| | Live Report; Stats Report | Noorafkan 87' (pen.) |

Tinsulanon Stadium, Songkhla
Attendance: 3,567
Referee: Hanna Hattab (Syria)

=== Group D ===
| Pos | Team | Pld | W | D | L | GF | GA | GD | Pts | Qualification |
|---|---|---|---|---|---|---|---|---|---|---|
| 1 | United Arab Emirates | 3 | 1 | 2 | 0 | 3 | 1 | +2 | 5 | Knockout stage |
| 2 | Jordan | 3 | 1 | 2 | 0 | 3 | 2 | +1 | 5 | Knockout stage |
| 3 | North Korea | 3 | 1 | 0 | 2 | 3 | 5 | −2 | 3 | |
| 4 | Vietnam | 3 | 0 | 2 | 1 | 1 | 2 | −1 | 2 | |

Source: AFC
Rules for classification: Group stage tiebreakers
10 January 2020
17:15

| Vietnam | 0–0 | United Arab Emirates |
|---|---|---|
| | Live Report; Stats Report |

Buriram Stadium, Buriram
Attendance: 3,967
Referee: Muhammad Taqi (Singapore)
10 January 2020
20:15

| North Korea | 1–2 | Jordan |
|---|---|---|
| Ryang Hyon-ju 90+1' | Live Report; Stats Report | Bani Atieh 45+1' (pen.); Hani 74' |

Buriram Stadium, Buriram
Attendance: 305
Referee: Alireza Faghani (Iran)

13 January 2020
17:15

| United Arab Emirates | 2–0 | North Korea |
|---|---|---|
| K. Al-Hammadi 17'; Z. Al-Ameri 30' | Live Report; Stats Report |

Buriram Stadium, Buriram
Attendance: 1,867
Referee: Ahmed Al-Kaf (Oman)
13 January 2020
20:15

| Jordan | 0–0 | Vietnam |
|---|---|---|
| | Live Report; Stats Report |

Buriram Stadium, Buriram
Attendance: 1,089
Referee: Ryuji Sato (Japan)

16 January 2020
20:15

| Vietnam | 1–2 | North Korea |
|---|---|---|
| Nguyễn Tiến Linh 16' | Live Report; Stats Report | Kang Kuk-chol 27'; Ri Chung-gyu 90' (pen.) |

Rajamangala Stadium, Bangkok
Attendance: 1,932
Referee: Mohanad Qasim Sarray (Iraq)
16 January 2020
20:15

| Jordan | 1–1 | United Arab Emirates |
|---|---|---|
| Al-Khawaldeh 79' | Live Report; Stats Report | Z. Al-Ameri 41' |

Buriram Stadium, Buriram
Attendance: 205
Referee: Nawaf Shukralla (Bahrain)

== Knockout stage ==
In the knockout stage, extra time and penalty shoot-out were used to decide the winner if necessary (Regulations Articles 12.1 and 12.2).

=== Bracket ===
Quarter-finals
18 January – Bangkok
Australia (a.e.t.) | 1
Syria | 0
19 January – Pathum Thani
South Korea | 2
Jordan | 1
18 January – Pathum Thani
Saudi Arabia | 1
Thailand | 0
19 January – Bangkok
United Arab Emirates | 1
Uzbekistan | 5

Semi-finals
22 January – Pathum Thani
Australia | 0
South Korea | 2
22 January – Bangkok
Saudi Arabia | 1
Uzbekistan | 0

Final
26 January – Bangkok
South Korea (a.e.t.) | 1
Saudi Arabia | 0
Third place match
25 January – Bangkok
Australia | 1
Uzbekistan | 0

=== Quarter-finals ===
18 January 2020
17:15

| Saudi Arabia | 1–0 | Thailand |
|---|---|---|
| Al-Hamdan 78' (pen.) | Live Report; Stats Report |

Thammasat Stadium, Pathum Thani
Attendance: 14,958
Referee: Ahmed Al-Kaf (Oman)

18 January 2020
20:15

| Australia | 1–0 (a.e.t.) | Syria |
|---|---|---|
| Touré 103' | Live Report; Stats Report |

Rajamangala Stadium, Bangkok
Attendance: 214
Referee: Ryuji Sato (Japan)

19 January 2020
17:15

| South Korea | 2–1 | Jordan |
|---|---|---|
| Cho Gue-sung 16'; Lee Dong-gyeong 90+5' | Live Report; Stats Report | Al-Naimat 75' |

Thammasat Stadium, Pathum Thani
Attendance: 596
Referee: Abdulrahman Al-Jassim (Qatar)

19 January 2020
20:15

| United Arab Emirates | 1–5 | Uzbekistan |
|---|---|---|
| Z. Al-Ameri 13' | Live Report; Stats Report | Alijanov 16'; Kobilov 26' (pen.); Bozorov 41'; Yakhshiboev 84'; Tukhtasinov 90+3' |

Rajamangala Stadium, Bangkok
Attendance: 244
Referee: Fu Ming (China PR)

=== Semi-finals ===
The winners qualified for the 2020 Summer Olympics.

22 January 2020
17:15

| Saudi Arabia | 1–0 | Uzbekistan |
|---|---|---|
| Al Omran 87' | Live Report; Stats Report |

Rajamangala Stadium, Bangkok
Attendance: 329
Referee: Ryuji Sato (Japan)

22 January 2020
20:15

| Australia | 0–2 | South Korea |
|---|---|---|
| | Live Report; Stats Report | Kim Dae-won 56'; Lee Dong-gyeong 76' |

Thammasat Stadium, Pathum Thani
Attendance: 789
Referee: Nawaf Shukralla (Bahrain)

=== Third place match ===
The winner qualified for the 2020 Summer Olympics.

25 January 2020
19:30

| Australia | 1–0 | Uzbekistan |
|---|---|---|
| D'Agostino 47' | Live Report; Stats Report |

Rajamangala Stadium, Bangkok
Attendance: 590
Referee: Mohammed Abdulla Hassan Mohamed (United Arab Emirates)

=== Final ===
26 January 2020
19:30

| South Korea | 1–0 (a.e.t.) | Saudi Arabia |
|---|---|---|
| Jeong Tae-wook 113' | Live Report; Stats Report |

Rajamangala Stadium, Bangkok
Attendance: 2,879
Referee: Chris Beath (Australia)

== Winners ==
2020 AFC U-23 Championship
(South Korea)
South Korea
1st title

== Awards ==
The following awards were given at the conclusion of the tournament:

| Top scorer | Most Valuable Player | Best Goalkeeper | Fair Play award |
|---|---|---|---|
| (Thailand) Jaroensak Wonggorn (Note: Playing fewer minutes than the other players scoring 3 goals, Wonggorn won the Top Scorer Award) | (South Korea) Won Du-jae | (South Korea) Song Bum-keun | Saudi Arabia |

== Goalscorers ==
There were 69 goals scored in 32 matches, for an average of 2.16 goals per match.

3 goals

- (Australia) Nicholas D'Agostino
- (Iraq) Mohammed Nassif
- (Thailand) Jaroensak Wonggorn
- (United Arab Emirates) Zaid Al-Ameri
- (Uzbekistan) Islom Kobilov

2 goals

- (Bahrain) Mohamed Marhoon
- (South Korea) Cho Gue-sung
- (South Korea) Lee Dong-gyeong
- (South Korea) Lee Dong-jun
- (South Korea) Oh Se-hun
- (Syria) Abd Al-Rahman Barakat
- (Syria) Alaa Al Dali
- (Thailand) Suphanat Mueanta
- (Uzbekistan) Nurillo Tukhtasinov

1 goal

- (Australia) Ramy Najjarine
- (Australia) Reno Piscopo
- (Australia) Al Hassan Touré
- (Bahrain) Sayed Hashim Isa
- (Iran) Reza Dehghani
- (Iran) Omid Noorafkan
- (Iran) Reza Shekari
- (Iraq) Amir Al-Ammari
- (Japan) Ryotaro Meshino
- (Japan) Koki Ogawa
- (Japan) Yuki Soma
- (Jordan) Ihab Al-Khawaldeh
- (Jordan) Yazan Al-Naimat
- (Jordan) Mohammad Bani Atieh
- (Jordan) Omar Hani
- (North Korea) Kang Kuk-chol
- (North Korea) Ri Chung-gyu
- (North Korea) Ryang Hyon-ju
- (Qatar) Yusuf Abdurisag
- (Qatar) Abdullah Al-Ahrak
- (Saudi Arabia) Firas Al-Buraikan
- (Saudi Arabia) Abdullah Al-Hamdan
- (Saudi Arabia) Ayman Al-Khulaif
- (Saudi Arabia) Nasser Al Omran
- (Saudi Arabia) Abdulrahman Ghareeb
- (South Korea) Jeong Tae-wook
- (South Korea) Kim Dae-won
- (Thailand) Anon Amornlerdsak
- (Thailand) Supachok Sarachat
- (United Arab Emirates) Khalifa Al-Hammadi
- (Uzbekistan) Bobur Abdikholikov
- (Uzbekistan) Ilkhom Alijanov
- (Uzbekistan) Oybek Bozorov
- (Uzbekistan) Jasurbek Yakhshiboev
- (Vietnam) Nguyễn Tiến Linh

1 own goal

- (Syria) Yosief Mohammad (against Qatar)

== Qualified teams for the Summer Olympics ==
The following four teams from the AFC qualified for the 2020 Summer Olympic men's football tournament, including Japan which qualified as the hosts.

| Team | Qualified on | Previous appearances in the Summer Olympics^{1} |
|---|---|---|
| Japan | 7 September 2013 | 10 (1936, 1956, 1964, 1968, 1996, 2000, 2004, 2008, 2012, 2016) |
| South Korea | 22 January 2020 | 10 (1948, 1964, 1988, 1992, 1996, 2000, 2004, 2008, 2012, 2016) |
| Saudi Arabia | 22 January 2020 | 2 (1984, 1996) |
| Australia | 25 January 2020 | 7^{2} (1956, 1988, 1992, 1996, 2000, 2004, 2008) |

^{1} Italic indicates hosts for that year.
^{2} Australia qualified as a member of the OFC for six tournaments between 1956 and 2004.
