= Song Min-kyu (footballer) =

South Korean footballer (born 1999)

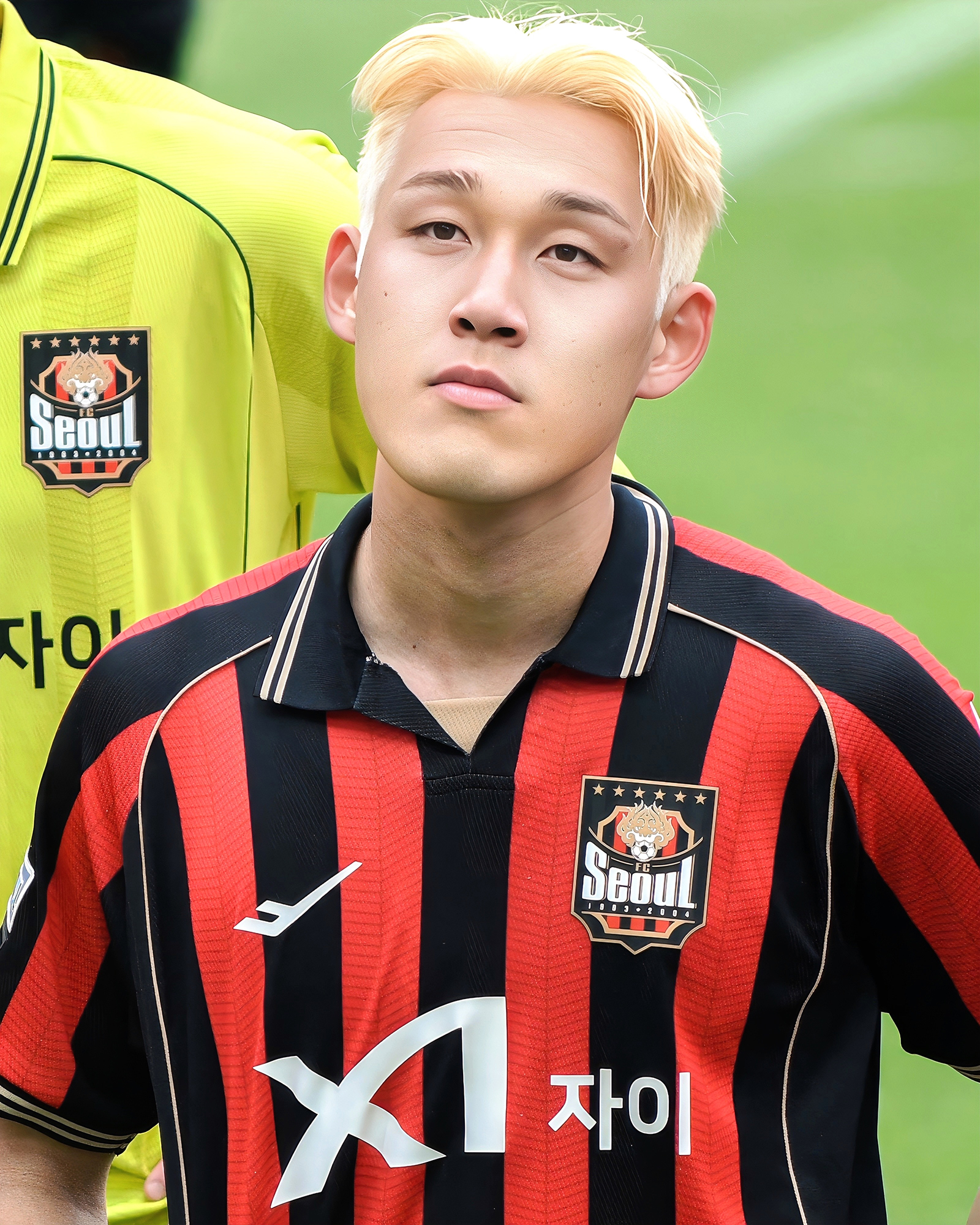
- Song in 2026

Personal information
- Full name: Song Min-kyu
- Date of birth: 12 September 1999 (age 27)
- Place of birth: Nonsan, South Korea
- Height: 1.81 m (5 ft 11 in)
- Positions: Winger; forward

Team information
- Current team: Nacional
- Number: 12

Youth career
- 2015–2016: Chungju Commercial High School (Youth)
- 2017: Chungju Commercial High School

Senior career*
Years	Team	Apps	(Gls)
2018–2021	Pohang Steelers	72	(19)
2021–2025	Jeonbuk Hyundai Motors	132	(24)
2026	FC Seoul	25	(5)
2026–	Nacional	6	(0)

International career^{‡}
2020–2023	South Korea U23	14 (Note: Includes two appearances one goal against another KFA team.)	(2)
2021–	South Korea	17	(1)
Medal record
Men's football
Representing South Korea
Asian Games
Gold medal – first place	2022 Hangzhou	Team
EAFF Championship
Runner-up	2022 Japan	Team
Korean name
Hangul	송민규
Hanja	宋旻揆
RR	Song Mingyu
MR	Song Min'gyu
- * Club domestic league appearances and goals as of 9 November 2026 ‡ National team caps and goals as of 17 November 2026

Song Min-kyu (Korean: 송민규; born 12 September 1999) is a South Korean footballer who plays as a winger or a forward for Primeira Liga club Nacional and the South Korea national team.

== Club career ==
Song started his career with Pohang Steelers. He scored his first goal for the club in a 1–0 win over Gangwon on the 3rd of April 2019.

== International career ==
Song made his debut for South Korea national team on 9 June 2021 in a 2022 FIFA World Cup qualifier against Sri Lanka.

On 11 November 2022, he scored his first international goal in a friendly match against Iceland. Song was then called up to South Korea for the 2022 FIFA World Cup held in Qatar, however he didn't play in all of the matches.

== Personal life ==
On May 3, 2025, Song announced his engagement to his girlfriend, announcer Gwak Min-seon. The couple married in December 2025.

== Career statistics ==
=== Club ===
As of 9 November 2026

Club performance			League		Cup		Continental		Other		Total	
Club	Season	League	Apps	Goals	Apps	Goals	Apps	Goals	Apps	Goals	Apps	Goals
Pohang Steelers	2018	K League 1	2	0	1	0	—		—		3	0
Pohang Steelers	2019	K League 1	27	2	0	0	—		—		27	2
Pohang Steelers	2020	K League 1	27	10	4	1	—		—		31	11
Pohang Steelers	2021	K League 1	16	7	1	0	0	0	—		17	7
Pohang Steelers	Total		72	19	6	1	0	0	—		78	20
Jeonbuk Hyundai Motors	2021	K League 1	17	3	—		2 (Note: Appearances in AFC Champions League)	0	—		19	3
Jeonbuk Hyundai Motors	2022	K League 1	22	3	5	0	5	1	—		32	4
Jeonbuk Hyundai Motors	2023	K League 1	30	7	3	2	4	1	—		37	10
Jeonbuk Hyundai Motors	2024	K League 1	28	6	1	0	5 (Note: Three appearances and one goal in AFC Champions League, two appearances and one goal in AFC Champions League Two)	2	1 (Note: Appearance in K League promotion-relegation play-offs)	0	35	8
Jeonbuk Hyundai Motors	2025	K League 1	35	5	4	1	2 (Note: Appearances in AFC Champions League Two)	1	—		41	7
Jeonbuk Hyundai Motors	Total		132	24	13	3	18	5	1	0	164	32
FC Seoul	2026	K League 1	25	5	0	0	4	0	—		29	5
Nacional	2026–27	Primeira Liga	6	0	1	0	—		—		7	0
Career total			235	48	20	4	22	5	1	0	278	57

=== International ===
As of match played on 17 November 2026

Appearances and goals by national team and year
National team	Year	Apps	Goals
South Korea	2021	7	0
South Korea	2022	6	1
South Korea	2023	0	0
South Korea	2024	1	0
South Korea	2026	3	0
Total		17	1

==== International goals ====
Scores and results list South Korea's goal tally first.

No.	Date	Venue	Opponent	Score	Result	Competition
1.	11 November 2022	Hwaseong Stadium, Hwaseong, South Korea	Iceland	1–0	1–0	Friendly

== Honours ==
South Korea U23

- Asian Games: 2022

Jeonbuk Hyundai Motors

- K League 1: 2021, 2025
- Korean FA Cup: 2022, 2025

Individual

- R League top assist provider: 2018
- K League Young Player of the Year: 2020
- K League 1 Best XI: 2025
