= Green Linnets (Ireland) =

Irish Regiment in the American Revolutionary War

The Green Linnets, also the Green Boys of Dublin was a regiment raised in Ireland which embarked in March 1781 from Poolbeg, Dublin to Jamaica to serve in the American Revolutionary War. The nicknames came from the colour of their coats. In popular memory those enlisted were betrayed after being promised their service would be confined to Ireland. The regiment was remembered in 1793 when the Irish Militia was reformed, leading to civil disturbance from potential conscripts who feared a similar breach of promise not to serve overseas in the Napoleonic Wars. John Doyle said in the Irish House of Commons that year:

It has, I fear, been mischievously insinuated amongst the peasantry, that they are liable to be sent on foreign service. Their suspicions on that subject have been considerably increased by the recollection of a circumstance which every man must remember. A regiment was raised by a gentleman of another country, under the idea of serving within the realm; from being clad in green, they were, by the people, called the Green Linnets. These men were assembled without arms, for the declared purpose of inspecting their necessaries, when they were immediately surrounded by four regiments of infantry, and one of cavalry, and marched like convicts on board a ship for the West Indies, from whence few, if any, ever returned. A procedure so infamous, as to damn any government, in even the most uncivilized country; — the impression is still fresh upon the public mind.

In 1796 in Paris, Wolfe Tone called the Légion Noire about to try an invasion of Great Britain "sad blackguards" who reminded him of the "Green Boys of Dublin". The green linnet was a symbol in several later Irish nationalist ballads, in turn providing the name for Green Linnet Records.
