= Mad Green Boys =

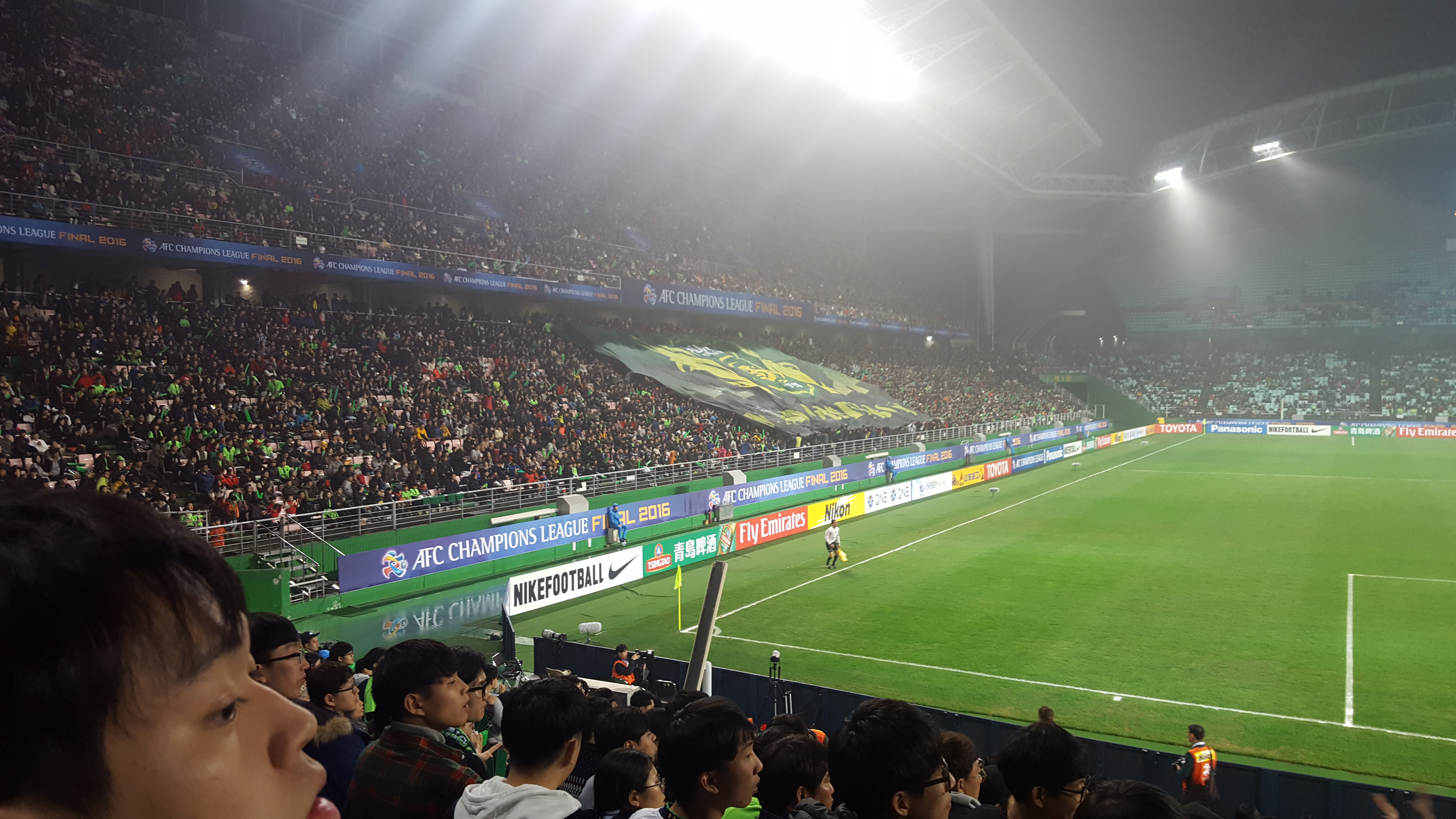
Mad Green Boys in 2016 AFC Champions League Final

The Mad Green Boys (MGB) are the official supporters' group of South Korean football club Jeonbuk Hyundai Motors FC, a team in the K League. It was established on November 1, 1999. They occupy the North Stand of the Jeonju World Cup Stadium.

It was selected as The Most Terrifying Supporters in 2016 by K Leaguers.

== History ==
The Mad Green Boys started on November 1, 1999, when a group of dedicated Jeonbuk fans created an organized supporters' group. The name "Mad Green Boys" reflects their passion ("mad") for the club's official color ("green"). The name was inspired by the "Bad Blue Boys," the supporters' group of Croatia's Dinamo Zagreb.

MGB's inaugural official activity occurred on March 28, 1998, when seven members traveled to Mokdong to support Jeonbuk in an away match against Bucheon SK.

In a 2011 AFC Champions League match versus J.League side Cerezo Osaka, an MGB member came under fire for holding up a sign 'congratulating' Japan on the 2011 earthquake in the east of the country. The supporter later apologized online for his actions.

In 2017, Jeonbuk made the decision to shift its primary colors from green to blue and white to align with Hyundai Motors' corporate identity. MGB opposed this change, organizing protests and engaging in discussions with club officials. The team restored the green color.

In March 2023, MGB publicly called for the resignation of then-manager Kim Sang-sik following a series of unsatisfactory performances.

As of 2025, the club officially recognized 22 supporters clubs.
