= Lee Ju-yong =

South Korean footballer (born 1992)

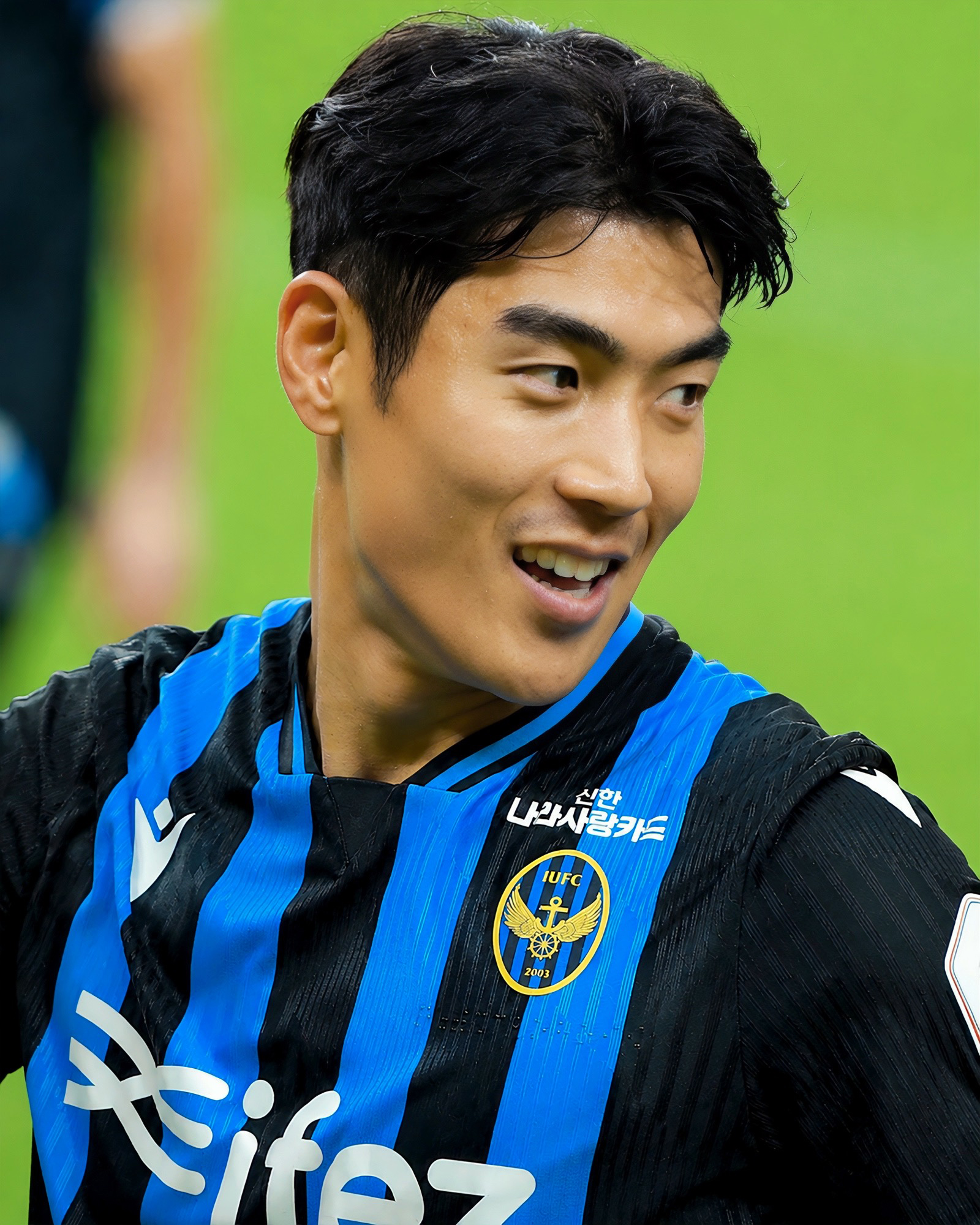
- Lee in 2026

Personal information
- Date of birth: 26 September 1992 (age 34)
- Place of birth: South Korea
- Height: 1.80 m (5 ft 11 in)
- Position: Full back

Team information
- Current team: Incheon United
- Number: 32

Youth career
- 2008–2010: Jeonju Youngsaeng High School
- 2011–2013: Dong-a University

Senior career*
Years	Team	Apps	(Gls)
2014–2023	Jeonbuk Hyundai Motors	83	(2)
2017–2018	→ Asan Mugunghwa (draft)	44	(1)
2022	→ Incheon United (loan)	10	(0)
2023–2024	Jeju United	49	(1)
2025–	Incheon United	56	(1)

International career^{‡}
2015–	South Korea	5	(0)
- * Club domestic league appearances and goals as of August 3, 2026 ‡ National team caps and goals as of November 17, 2020

- Lee Ju-yong
- Hangul: 이주용
- Hanja: 李周勇
- RR: I Juyong
- MR: I Chuyong

Lee Ju-yong (Korean: 이주용; born 26 September 1992) is a South Korean footballer who plays as full back for Incheon United in K League 1.

== Career ==
He was selected by Jeonbuk Hyundai Motors in the 2011 K-League draft and entered Dong-a University. He joined Jeonbuk before 2014 season starts.

== Club career statistics ==
As of 23 October 2022

Club performance			League		Cup		Continental		Total	
Season	Club	League	Apps	Goals	Apps	Goals	Apps	Goals	Apps	Goals
2014	Jeonbuk Hyundai Motors	K League 1	22	1	2	0	0	0	24	1
2015	Jeonbuk Hyundai Motors	K League 1	20	1	2	0	2	0	24	1
2016	Jeonbuk Hyundai Motors	K League 1	7	0	2	0	1	0	10	0
2017	Asan Mugunghwa (draft)	K League 2	25	0	2	0	—		27	0
2018	Asan Mugunghwa (draft)	K League 2	19	1	3	0	—		22	1
2018	Jeonbuk Hyundai Motors	K League 1	3	0	0	0	—		3	0
2019	Jeonbuk Hyundai Motors	K League 1	15	0	1	0	3	0	19	0
2020	Jeonbuk Hyundai Motors	K League 1	10	0	4	0	0	0	14	0
2021	Jeonbuk Hyundai Motors	K League 1	6	0	0	0	2	0	8	0
2022	Incheon United (loan)	K League 1	10	0	1	0	—		11	0
2023	Jeju United	K League 1	0	0	0	0	0	0	11	0
Career total			137	3	17	0	8	0	162	3

== Honours ==
=== Club ===
Jeonbuk Hyundai Motors

- K League 1 : 2014, 2015, 2019, 2020, 2021
- AFC Champions League : 2016
- KFA Cup : 2020

Asan Mugunghwa

- K League 2 : 2018

Incheon United

- K League 2 : 2025

South Korea

- EAFF Championship : 2015

Individual

- K League 2 Best XI : 2025
