= South Korea national under-23 football team results =

This article is the match statistics of the South Korea national under-23 football team.

== Results by year ==
=== 1990s ===
Year	Pld	W	D	L	Win %
1991	14	13	1	0	92.86
1992	16	8	5	3	50.00
1993	Did not play				
1994	4	3	1	0	75.00
1995	25	11	7	7	44.00
1996	14	5	6	3	35.71
1997	Did not play				
1998	Did not play				
1999	20	16	2	2	80.00
Total	93	56	22	15	60.22

=== 2000s ===
Year	Pld	W	D	L	Win %
2000	10	9	0	1	90.00
2001	Did not play				
2002	9	7	2	0	77.78
2003	9	7	1	1	77.78
2004	22	12	5	5	54.55
2005	Did not play				
2006	9	5	2	2	55.56
2007	13	8	4	1	61.54
2008	6	4	1	1	66.67
2009	1	0	0	1	0.00
Total	79	52	15	12	65.82

=== 2010s ===
Year	Pld	W	D	L	Win %
2010	8	5	0	3	62.50
2011	8	6	2	0	75.00
2012	22	13	7	2	59.09
2013	1	0	0	1	0.00
2014	21	12	5	4	57.14
2015	15	9	5	1	60.00
2016	18	11	5	2	61.11
2017	3	2	1	0	66.67
2018	14	10	1	3	71.43
2019	9	5	3	1	55.56
Total	119	73	29	17	61.34

=== 2020s ===
Year	Pld	W	D	L	Win %
2020	8	6	1	1	75.00
2021	11	7	1	3	63.64
2022	7	3	2	2	42.86
2023	16	14	0	2	87.50
2024	13	6	3	4	46.15
2025	13	6	2	5	46.15
2026	18	10	4	4	55.56
Total	86	52	13	21	60.47

== Non-international matches ==
The following matches are non-international matches against clubs, regional teams, and other KFA teams, but these are being included in player records of the KFA website.

Date	Competition	Team scorer(s)	Score	Opponent scorer(s)	Opponent	Venue	Ref.	Note(s)
1991-10-25	Friendly	Seo Jung-won 57'; Kim Byung-soo 68'; Shin Tae-yong 77'	3–1	Allgöwer 34'	Germany Legends	Busan Gudeok Stadium; Busan, South Korea		
1991-10-27	Friendly	—	0–0	—	Germany Legends	Busan Gudeok Stadium; Busan, South Korea		
1991-12-01	Friendly	Seo Jung-won 31'	1–0	—	(Soviet Union) Spartak Moscow	South Korea		
1991-12-03	Friendly	—	0–1	Ivanov 1'	(Soviet Union) Spartak Moscow	South Korea		
1991-12-05	Friendly	Seo Jung-won 2'	1–1	Rakhimov 67'	(Soviet Union) Spartak Moscow	South Korea		
1995-03-10	Friendly	Oh Gwang-hoon 22'; Park Sung-bae 31'; Lee Kyung-soo 73'	3–0	—	(Italy) Carlo Grasso	Rapallo, Italy		
1995-03-13	Friendly	Lee Ki-hyung 5'; Cho Hyun 16'; Lee Kyung-soo 66'; Park Sung-bae 73'	4–0	—	(Italy) Rapallo XI	Rapallo, Italy		
1995-03-15	Friendly	Hong Jong-gyeong 67'	1–0	—	(Italy) Spezia	Stadio Alberto Picco; La Spezia, Italy		
1995-03-17	Friendly	—	0–4		(France) Cannes	Cannes, France		
1995-05-05	Friendly	—	0–0	—	(Brazil) Botafogo	Seoul Olympic Stadium; Seoul, South Korea		
1995-05-07	Friendly	—	0–2	Paulinho 24'; Guga 53'	(Brazil) Botafogo	Seoul Olympic Stadium; Seoul, South Korea		
1995-08-06	Friendly	Woo Sung-yong 27', 56'; Choi Yong-soo 32', 47', 50'; Jo Jong-hwa 44'; Cho Hyun 72'	7–2	Castro 6'; Gómez 35'	(Costa Rica) Herediano	Gangneung Stadium; Gangneung, South Korea		
1995-08-09	Friendly	Jo Jong-hwa 78'	1–1	Arguedas 39'	(Costa Rica) Herediano	Daegu Civic Stadium; Daegu, South Korea		
1995-11-29	Friendly	Lee Ki-hyung 9'; Choi Yong-soo 33'	2–1	Eriksson 4'	(Sweden) IFK Göteborg	Changwon Stadium; Changwon, South Korea		
1996-03-03	Friendly	Choi Yong-soo 80', 90+4'	2–2	Nielsen 11'; Lüthje 79'	(Denmark) Lyngby	Suwon Sports Complex; Suwon, South Korea		
1996-03-06	Friendly	—	0–0	—	(Denmark) Lyngby	Changwon Stadium; Changwon, South Korea		
1996-04-21	Friendly	Lee Kyung-soo 41'	1–2	Kim Do-hoon 15'; Hwang Sun-hong 42'	South Korea A	Seoul Olympic Stadium; Seoul, South Korea		
1996-05-05	Friendly	Choi Yong-soo 51'; Lee Ki-hyung 55'; Chung Sang-nam 76'; Lee Won-shik 88'	4–0	—	(Costa Rica) Herediano	Seoul Olympic Stadium; Seoul, South Korea		
1996-05-29	Friendly	—	0–0	—	(Germany) VfB Stuttgart	Changwon Stadium; Changwon, South Korea		
1999-08-09	Friendly	Choi Chul-woo 2', 33'; Lee Kwan-woo 41'	3–0	—	(Netherlands) NAC Breda	Amsterdam, Netherlands		
1999-08-09	Friendly	Choi Chul-woo 32'	1–0	—	(Netherlands) PSV Eindhoven	Eindhoven, Netherlands		
1999-08-20	Friendly	Seo Ki-bok 15', 20'; Park Ji-sung 31'; Seol Ki-hyeon 46'; Park Dong-hyuk 52' (pen.); Kim Dong-seon 71'	6–0	—	(Algeria) Mouloudia Club	Prague, Czech Republic		
2003-07-14	Friendly	Jung Jo-gook 50'; Kim Jung-woo 76'	2–2	Kežman 58', 78'	(Netherlands) PSV Eindhoven	Daegu Stadium; Daegu, South Korea		
2020-10-09	Friendly	Song Min-kyu 50'; Kwon Kyung-won 59' (o.g.)	2–2	Lee Ju-yong 14'; Lee Jeong-hyeop 89'	South Korea A	Goyang Stadium; Goyang, South Korea		
2020-10-12	Friendly	—	0–3	Lee Dong-gyeong 55'; Lee Ju-yong 89'; Lee Yeong-jae 90+2'	South Korea A	Goyang Stadium; Goyang, South Korea		

== See also ==
- South Korea national under-23 football team
