= 2020 Ulsan Hyundai FC season =

Ulsan Hyundai
2020 season
- Chairman: Chung Mong-joon
- Head Coach: Kim Do-hoon
- Stadium: Ulsan Munsu Football Stadium
- K League 1: 2nd
- FA Cup: Runners-up
- Champions League: Winners
- Top goalscorer: League: Júnior Negrão (26); All: Júnior Negrão (35)
- Highest home attendance: All: 3,350 (11 February vs. FC Tokyo); League: 6,973 (25 October vs. Jeonbuk Hyundai Motors)
- Lowest home attendance: League: 2,659 (8 August vs. Suwon Samsung Bluewings)
- Average home league attendance: 3,744
- Biggest win: League/All: 1–5 (25 July vs. Sangju Sangmu)
- Biggest defeat: League/All: 4–0 (18 October vs. Pohang Steelers)
Home colours	Away colours

The 2020 season was Ulsan Hyundai FC's 37th season in the K League 1 in South Korea. Ulsan Hyundai competed K League 1, FA Cup, AFC Champions League. Ulsan Hyundai played their first match on 9 May after the league was suspended during the COVID-19 pandemic.

== Kits ==
Supplier: Hummel / Sponsor: 태화강 국가정원 현대오일뱅크 프리미엄 선박유 HYUNDAI S-T☆R / Rear sponsor: 현대중공업 현대건설기계 / Sleeve Partner: HYUNDAI S-T☆R ULSAN / Champions League Partner: Hyundai Oilbank

Home	Away	Home (ACL)	Away (ACL)

== Management team ==
Position	Name
Head coach	(South Korea) Kim Do-hoon
Assistant head coach	(South Korea) Myung Jae-yong
Assistant coaches	(South Korea) Kim In-soo
Assistant coaches	(South Korea) Byun Jae-sub
Goalkeeper coach	(South Korea) Kim Bum-soo
Fitness Coach	(Japan) Tsukoshi Tomo
Individual Coach	(South Korea) Lee In-cheol
Individual Coach	(South Korea) Jeong Seong-deok
Individual Coach	(South Korea) Lee Won-bin
Video Analyst	(South Korea) Kim Young-kwang
Scouter	(South Korea) Kim Young-ki

== Squad ==
=== Current squad ===
Squad No.	Name	Nationality	Position(s)	Date of birth (age)
Goalkeepers
1	Jo Su-huk	(South Korea)	GK	18 March 1987 (age 39)
21	Jo Hyeon-woo	(South Korea)	GK	25 September 1991 (age 35)
25	Seo Ju-hwan	(South Korea)	GK	24 June 1999 (age 27)
88	Min Dong-hwan	(South Korea)	GK	12 January 2001 (age 25)
Defenders
2	Jeong Dong-ho	(South Korea)	DF	7 March 1990 (age 36)
3	Davidson	(Australia)	DF	29 June 1991 (age 35)
4	Bulthuis	(Netherlands)	DF	28 June 1990 (age 36)
5	Kim Min-duk	(South Korea)	DF	8 July 1996 (age 30)
6	Park Joo-ho	(South Korea)	DF	16 January 1987 (age 39)
15	Jung Seung-hyun (3rd C)	(South Korea)	DF	3 April 1994 (age 32)
23	Kim Tae-hwan (VC)	(South Korea)	DF	24 July 1989 (age 37)
26	Cho Hyun-taek	(South Korea)	DF	2 August 2001 (age 25)
32	Hong Chul	(South Korea)	DF	17 September 1990 (age 36)
44	Kim Kee-hee	(South Korea)	DF	13 July 1989 (age 37)
45	Lee Gi-un	(South Korea)	DF	15 February 1997 (age 29)
66	Seol Young-woo	(South Korea)	DF	5 December 1998 (age 27)
Midfielders
8	Sin Jin-ho (C)	(South Korea)	MF	7 September 1988 (age 38)
10	Yoon Bit-garam	(South Korea)	MF	7 May 1990 (age 36)
14	Lee Dong-gyeong	(South Korea)	MF	18 November 1997 (age 28)
16	Won Du-jae	(South Korea)	MF	18 November 1997 (age 28)
17	Kim Sung-joon	(South Korea)	MF	8 April 1988 (age 38)
22	Koh Myong-jin	(South Korea)	MF	9 January 1988 (age 38)
24	Lee Hyeon-seung	(South Korea)	MF	15 June 2000 (age 26)
27	Jang Jae-won	(South Korea)	MF	21 April 1998 (age 28)
33	Park Ha-bean	(South Korea)	MF	23 April 1997 (age 29)
72	Lee Chung-yong	(South Korea)	MF	2 July 1988 (age 38)
98	Lee Sang-heon (4th C)	(South Korea)	MF	26 February 1998 (age 28)
Forwards
7	Kim In-sung	(South Korea)	FW	9 September 1989 (age 37)
9	Júnior	(Brazil)	FW	30 December 1986 (age 39)
11	Lee Keun-ho	(South Korea)	FW	11 April 1985 (age 41)
13	Kim Min-jun	(South Korea)	FW	12 February 2000 (age 26)
19	Bjørn Johnsen	(Norway)	FW	6 November 1991 (age 35)
29	Lee Hyeong-kyeong	(South Korea)	FW	11 May 1998 (age 28)
30	Jung Hoon-sung	(South Korea)	FW	22 February 1994 (age 32)
99	Park Jeong-in	(South Korea)	FW	7 October 2000 (age 26)

Last updated: 1 July 2020.
Source: Ulsan Hyundai FC

== Transfers ==
=== Released ===
Date from	Position	Nationality	Name	To	Notes	Ref.
7 January 2020	FW	(South Korea)	Kim Su-an	(South Korea) Seoul E-Land	Released	
15 January 2020	DF	(South Korea)	Lee Ji-hoon	(South Korea) Suwon FC	Released	
27 January 2020	DF	(South Korea)	Park Jae-min	(South Korea) Daejeon Korail	Released	
8 February 2020	GK	(South Korea)	Park Suk-min	(South Korea) Hwaseong FC	Released	
12 February 2020	MF	(South Korea)	Lee Ji-seung	(South Korea) Busan IPark	Released	
15 February 2020	DF	(South Korea)	Kang Min-soo	(South Korea) Busan IPark	Released	

=== Loans out ===
Date from	Position	Nationality	Name	To	Date until	Ref.
9 December 2019	MF	(South Korea)	Park Yong-woo	(South Korea) Sangju Sangmu		
9 December 2019	FW	(South Korea)	Oh Se-hun	(South Korea) Sangju Sangmu		
4 January 2020	GK	(South Korea)	Moon Jung-in	(South Korea) Seoul E-Land		
9 January 2020	DF	(South Korea)	Kim Jae-sung	(South Korea) Chungnam Asan		
9 January 2020	MF	(South Korea)	Lee Sang-min	(South Korea) Chungnam Asan		
16 January 2020	DF	(South Korea)	Lee Myung-jae	(South Korea) Sangju Sangmu		
29 January 2020	DF	(South Korea)	Lee Sang-min	(South Korea) Seoul E-Land		
25 June 2020	DF	(South Korea)	Choi Jun	(South Korea) Gyeongnam FC		
25 June 2020	DF	(South Korea)	Yun Young-sun	(South Korea) FC Seoul		
2 July 2020	FW	(South Korea)	Son Ho-jun	(South Korea) Gimpo Citizen		

=== Transfers in ===
Date from	Position	Nationality	Name	From	Fee	Ref.
24 December 2019	MF	(South Korea)	Koh Myong-jin	(Croatia) Slaven Belupo	Free transfer	
3 January 2020	MF	(South Korea)	Won Du-jae	(Japan) Avispa Fukuoka	Undisclosed	
3 January 2020	DF	(South Korea)	Jung Seung-hyun	(Japan) Kashima Antlers	Undisclosed	
6 January 2020	FW	(Norway)	Bjørn Johnsen	(Netherlands) AZ	€1.000.000	
7 January 2020	FW	(South Korea)	Jung Hoon-sung	(South Korea) Incheon United	Undisclosed	
20 January 2020	GK	(South Korea)	Jo Hyeon-woo	(South Korea) Daegu FC	Free transfer	
31 January 2020	MF	(South Korea)	Yoon Bit-garam	(South Korea) Jeju United	Free transfer	
25 February 2020	DF	(South Korea)	Kim Kee-hee	(United States) Seattle Sounders FC	Free transfer	
3 March 2020	MF	(South Korea)	Lee Chung-yong	(Germany) VfL Bochum	Free transfer	
1 July 2020	DF	(South Korea)	Hong Chul	(South Korea) Suwon Samsung Bluewings	€487.500	

=== Transfers out ===
Date from	Position	Nationality	Name	To	Fee	Ref.
31 December 2019	MF	(United States)	Mix	(England) Manchester City	Loan return	
31 December 2019	MF	(South Korea)	Kim Bo-kyung	(Japan) Kashiwa Reysol	Loan return	
1 January 2020	FW	(South Korea)	Hwang Il-su	(South Korea) Gyeongnam FC	Undisclosed	
7 January 2020	DF	(South Korea)	Kim Chang-soo	(South Korea) Gwangju FC	Undisclosed	
9 January 2020	FW	(South Korea)	Lee Jong-ho	(South Korea) Jeonnam Dragons	Undisclosed	
10 January 2020	GK	(South Korea)	Kim Seung-gyu	(Japan) Kashiwa Reysol	Undisclosed	
13 January 2020	MF	(South Korea)	Kim Geon-ung	(South Korea) Suwon FC	Undisclosed	
6 February 2020	FW	(South Korea)	Joo Min-kyu	(South Korea) Jeju United	€430.000	

== Friendlies ==
17 January 2020 Friendly	Ho Chi Minh City (Vietnam)	0–1	(South Korea) Ulsan Hyundai	Ho Chi Minh City, Vietnam
19:30 ICT		Report	Kim In-sung 35'	Stadium: Thống Nhất Stadium

21 January 2020 Friendly	Ulsan Hyundai (South Korea)	6–1	(China) Guizhou Hengfeng	Chiang Mai, Thailand
15:00 ICT	Júnior 7', 22'; Lee Sang-heon 13' (pen.); Lee Hyeong-kyeong 76', 77'; Kim Min-jun 86'		28'	Stadium: Alpine Golf Resort Chiangmai

23 January 2020 Friendly	Ulsan Hyundai (South Korea)	2–0	(Japan) Hokkaido Consadole Sapporo	Chiang Mai, Thailand
15:00 ICT	Júnior 31'; Johnsen 46'			Stadium: Alpine Golf Resort Chiangmai

23 January 2020 Friendly	Ulsan Hyundai (South Korea)	2–2	(Japan) Hokkaido Consadole Sapporo	Chiang Mai, Thailand
ICT	Kim Min-jun 5', 13'		23'; 29'	Stadium: Alpine Golf Resort Chiangmai

== Competitions ==
=== Overview ===
Competition	First match	Last match	Starting round	Record							
Competition	First match	Last match	Starting round	Pld	W	D	L	GF	GA	GD	Win %
K League 1	9 May 2020	1 November 2020	Matchday 1	27	17	6	4	54	23	+31	62.96
FA Cup	15 July 2020	8 November 2020	Round of 16	5	2	2	1	8	4	+4	40.00
Champions League	11 February 2020	19 December 2020	Group stage	10	9	1	0	23	7	+16	90.00
Total				42	28	9	5	85	34	+51	66.67

Last updated: 19 December 2020
Source: Soccerway

=== K League 1 ===
==== League table ====
Pos	Team	Pld	W	D	L	GF	GA	GD	Pts	Qualification or relegation (Note: Teams are split into two groups (Final A and Final B) after each have played 22 matches.)
1	Jeonbuk Hyundai Motors (C)	27	19	3	5	46	21	+25	60	Qualification for Champions League group stage
2	Ulsan Hyundai	27	17	6	4	54	23	+31	57	Qualification for Champions League group stage
3	Pohang Steelers	27	15	5	7	56	35	+21	50	Qualification for Champions League group stage
4	Sangju Sangmu (Note: Sangju Sangmu were a military team and were not eligible to represent South Korea in the AFC club competitions. Additionally, they were relegated to K League 2 regardless of their final position by moving their stronghold the next season.) (R)	27	13	5	9	34	36	−2	44	Relegation to K League 2
5	Daegu FC	27	10	8	9	43	39	+4	38	Qualification for Champions League group stage

Source: K League
Rules for classification: 1) Points; 2) Goals scored; 3) Goal difference; 4) Wins; 5) Head-to-head points
(C) Champions; (R) Relegated

==== Results summary ====
Overall								Home						Away					
Pld	W	D	L	GF	GA	GD	Pts	W	D	L	GF	GA	GD	W	D	L	GF	GA	GD
27	17	6	4	54	23	+31	57	8	4	2	25	8	+17	9	2	2	29	15	+14

Last updated: 1 November 2020.
Source: K League

==== Results by round ====
Matchday	1	2	3	4	5	6	7	8	9	10	11	12	13	14	15	16	17	18	19	20	21	22	23	24	25	26	27
Ground	H	A	H	A	A	H	A	A	H	H	A	H	A	A	H	H	A	H	H	H	A	A	A	H	A	H	H
Result	W	W	D	D	W	W	W	W	L	W	W	W	W	W	D	W	W	W	D	D	L	W	D	W	L	L	W
Position/	1	1	2	2	2	2	2	2	2	2	1	1	1	1	1	1	1	1	1	1	1	1	1	1	1	2	2

Updated to match(es) played on 1 November 2020. Source: K League
A = Away; H = Home; W = Win; D = Draw; L = Loss

==== Matches ====
All times are Korea Standard Time (KST) – UTC+9

9 May 2020 1	Ulsan Hyundai	4–0	Sangju Sangmu	Ulsan
14:00 KST	Júnior 8', 45+1' (pen.); Lee Sang-heon 51'; Yoon Bit-garam 75'; Davidson (yellow card) 89'; Ulsan Hyundai	Report	Bae Jae-woo (yellow card) 45'; Sangju Sangmu	Stadium: Ulsan Munsu Football Stadium; Attendance: 0 Referee: Lee Dong-jun; Assistant referees: Park Sang-jun; Kang Dong-ho; Fourth official: Chae Sang-hyeop Video assistant referee: Mae Ho-young Assistant video assistant referees: Choi Gwang-ho

17 May 2020 2	Suwon Samsung Bluewings	2–3	Ulsan Hyundai	Suwon
16:30 KST	Lee Jong-sung (yellow card) 5'; Ko Seung-beom 45'; Krpić 47'; Suwon Samsung Bluewings	Report	Jung Seung-hyun (yellow card) 10'; Júnior 54', 89'; Kim In-sung 61'; Ulsan Hyundai	Stadium: Suwon World Cup Stadium; Attendance: 0 Referee: Kim Yong-woo; Assistant referees: Ji Seung-min; Kim Gye-yong; Fourth official: Kim Young-su Video assistant referee: Ko Hyung-jin Assistant video assistant referees: Choi Gyu-hyeon

24 May 2020 3	Ulsan Hyundai	1–1	Busan IPark	Ulsan
19:00 KST	Lee Sang-heon (yellow card) 27'; Júnior 79' (pen.); Kim Tae-hwan (yellow card) 87'; Ulsan Hyundai	Report	Lee Dong-jun (yellow card) 32'; Lee Jeong-hyeop 55'; Kim Moon-hwan (yellow card) 80'; Busan IPark	Stadium: Ulsan Munsu Football Stadium; Attendance: 0 Referee: Ko Hyung-jin; Assistant referees: Lee Jung-min; Kim Ji-wook; Fourth official: Choi Gwang-ho Video assistant referee: Park Byung-jin Assistant video assistant referees: Kim Dong-in

30 May 2020 4	Gwangju FC	1–1	Ulsan Hyundai	Gwangju
19:00 KST	Um Won-sang 12'; Gwangju FC	Report	Lee Han-do 22' (o.g.); Bulthuis (yellow card) 51'; Ulsan Hyundai	Stadium: Gwangju World Cup Stadium; Attendance: 0 Referee: Kim Hee-gon; Assistant referees: Park Sang-jun; Yang Jae-yong; Fourth official: Lee Dong-jun Video assistant referee: Ko Hyung-jin Assistant video assistant referees: Choi Dae-woo

6 June 2020 5	Pohang Steelers	0–4	Ulsan Hyundai	Pohang
19:00 KST	Iljutcenko (yellow card) 16'; Pohang Steelers	Report	Kim Tae-hwan (yellow card) 16'; Lee Chung-yong 26', 36'; Won Du-jae (yellow card) 40'; Kim In-sung 75'; Júnior 85'; Lee Dong-gyeong (yellow card) 90+1'; Ulsan Hyundai	Stadium: Pohang Steel Yard; Attendance: 0 Referee: Kim Jong-hyeok; Assistant referees: Kim Sung-il; Kwak Seung-soon; Fourth official: Cho Ji-um Video assistant referee: Choi Dae-woo Assistant video assistant referees: Kim Woo-sung

13 June 2020 6	Ulsan Hyundai	1–0	Seongnam FC	Ulsan
16:30 KST	Kim In-sung (yellow card) 16'; Júnior 88'; Ulsan Hyundai	Report	Park Soo-il (yellow card) 27'; Lee Jae-won (yellow card) 51'; Lee Chang-yong (yellow card) 62'; Seongnam FC	Stadium: Ulsan Munsu Football Stadium; Attendance: 0 Referee: Ko Hyung-jin; Assistant referees: Park Sang-jun; Kim Ji-wook; Fourth official: Kim Hee-gon Video assistant referee: Kim Sung-ho Assistant video assistant referees: Kim Dong-in

16 June 2020 7	Gangwon FC	0–3	Ulsan Hyundai	Gangneung
19:00 KST	Gangwon FC	Report	Yoon Bit-garam 72'; Júnior 77'; Johnsen 87' (pen.); Ulsan Hyundai	Stadium: Gangneung Stadium; Attendance: 0 Referee: Lee Dong-jun; Assistant referees: Kim Gye-yong; Gu Eun-seok; Fourth official: Kim Young-su Video assistant referee: Kim Jong-hyeok Assistant video assistant referees: Kim Dong-in

20 June 2020 8	FC Seoul	0–2	Ulsan Hyundai	Seoul
19:00 KST	Ju Se-jong (yellow card) 34' (yellow-red card) 62'; FC Seoul	Report	Kim Kee-hee (yellow card) 29'; Johnsen 66'; Júnior 90+1'; Ulsan Hyundai	Stadium: Seoul World Cup Stadium; Attendance: 0 Referee: Kim Woo-sung; Assistant referees: Lee Jung-min; Yang Jae-yong; Fourth official: Park Byung-jin Video assistant referee: Kim Dae-yong Assistant video assistant referees: Lim Jung-soo

28 June 2020 9	Ulsan Hyundai	0–2	Jeonbuk Hyundai Motors	Ulsan
18:00 KST	Lee Keun-ho (yellow card) 17'; Kim Kee-hee (red card) 19'; Won Du-jae (yellow card) 72'; Lee Chung-yong (yellow card) 84'; Ulsan Hyundai	Report	Son Jun-ho (yellow card) 14'; Han Kyo-won 45'; Kunimoto 90+5'; Jeonbuk Hyundai Motors	Stadium: Ulsan Munsu Football Stadium; Attendance: 0 Referee: Kim Hee-gon; Assistant referees: Park Sang-jun; Ji Seung-min; Fourth official: Ko Hyung-jin Video assistant referee: Kim Sung-ho Assistant video assistant referees: Choi Gwang-ho

4 July 2020 10	Ulsan Hyundai	4–1	Incheon United	Ulsan
18:00 KST	Lee Chung-yong 15'; Júnior 20', 44', 78'; Jung Seung-hyun (yellow card) 71'; Ulsan Hyundai	Report	Mugosa 34'; Kim Joon-beom (yellow card) 88'; Incheon United	Stadium: Ulsan Munsu Football Stadium; Attendance: 0 Referee: Chae Sang-hyeop; Assistant referees: Noh Su-yong; Kim Ji-wook; Fourth official: Kim Jong-hyeok Video assistant referee: Kim Dae-yong Assistant video assistant referees: Kim Dong-in

12 July 2020 11	Daegu FC	1–3	Ulsan Hyundai	Daegu
19:00 KST	Kim Dae-won (yellow card) 40'; Kim Dong-jin 58', (yellow card) 68'; Daegu FC	Report	Sin Jin-ho 18', (yellow card) 25'; Júnior 56', 82'; Jo Hyeon-woo (yellow card) 89'; Park Joo-ho (yellow card) 90'; Ulsan Hyundai	Stadium: DGB Daegu Bank Park; Attendance: 0 Referee: Kim Dae-yong; Assistant referees: Kim Sung-il; Kim Gye-yong; Fourth official: Kim Yong-woo Video assistant referee: Kim Sung-ho Assistant video assistant referees: Choi Gyu-hyeon

19 July 2020 12	Ulsan Hyundai	1–0	Gangwon FC	Ulsan
19:00 KST	Bulthuis (yellow card) 7'; Júnior 29' (pen.); Sin Jin-ho (yellow card) 54'; Jo Hyeon-woo (yellow card) 68'; Ulsan Hyundai	Report	Seo Min-woo (yellow card) 28'; Gangwon FC	Stadium: Ulsan Munsu Football Stadium; Attendance: 0 Referee: Cho Ji-um; Assistant referees: Noh Su-yong; Kang Dong-ho; Fourth official: Choi Il-woo Video assistant referee: Kim Sung-ho Assistant video assistant referees: Choi Gwang-ho

25 July 2020 13	Sangju Sangmu	1–5	Ulsan Hyundai	Sangju
19:00 KST	Kang Sang-woo 4'; Park Byung-hyun (yellow card) 65' (yellow-red card) 84'; Sangju Sangmu	Report	Kim In-sung 18', (yellow card) 19'; Júnior 18', 45'; Kim Jin-hyuk 58' (o.g.); Lee Dong-gyeong 87', (yellow card) 88'; Bulthuis (yellow card) 89'; Ulsan Hyundai	Stadium: Sangju Civic Stadium; Attendance: 0 Referee: Kim Dae-yong; Assistant referees: Park Sang-jun; Gu Eun-seok; Fourth official: Oh Hyun-jin Video assistant referee: Kim Sung-ho Assistant video assistant referees: Sung Duck-hyo

2 August 2020 14	Busan IPark	1–2	Ulsan Hyundai	Busan
19:00 KST	Kwon Hyeok-kyu (yellow card) 45+1'; Lee Dong-jun (yellow card) 65'; Kim Kim Hyun 79'; Vintecinco (yellow card) 90+1'; Busan IPark	Report	Koh Myong-jin (yellow card) 20'; Hong Chul (yellow card) 36'; Yoon Bit-garam 45+1'; Jung Seung-hyun (yellow card) 79'; Júnior 83'; Ulsan Hyundai	Stadium: Busan Gudeok Stadium; Attendance: 586; Referee: Ko Hyung-jin; Assistant referees: Kim Sung-il; Lee Jung-min; Fourth official: Kim Do-yeon Video assistant referee: Kim Hee-gon Assistant video assistant referees: Kim Dong-in

8 August 2020 15	Ulsan Hyundai	0–0	Suwon Samsung Bluewings	Ulsan
19:00 KST	Kim Tae-hwan (yellow card) 13' (yellow-red card) 90+2'; Koh Myong-jin (yellow card) 80'; Jung Seung-hyun (yellow card) 90+6'; Ulsan Hyundai	Report	Lee Sang-min (yellow card) 41'; Yang Hyung-mo (yellow card) 90+5'; Suwon Samsung Bluewings	Stadium: Ulsan Munsu Football Stadium; Attendance: 2,659; Referee: Kim Hee-gon; Assistant referees: Kang Dong-ho; Kim Gye-yong; Fourth official: Ko Hyung-jin Video assistant referee: Kim Sung-ho Assistant video assistant referees: Kim Dong-in

15 August 2020 16	Ulsan Hyundai	2–0	Pohang Steelers	Ulsan
19:00 KST	Kim In-sung 53'; Johnsen 56'; Koh Myong-jin (yellow card) 58'; Ulsan Hyundai	Report	Ha Chang-rae (yellow card) 32'; Pohang Steelers	Stadium: Ulsan Munsu Football Stadium; Attendance: 3,242; Referee: Park Byung-jin; Assistant referees: Yoon Kwang-yeol; Park Kyun-yong; Fourth official: Kim Dong-jin Video assistant referee: Lee Dong-jun Assistant video assistant referees: Lim Jung-soo

23 August 2020 17	Seongnam FC	1–2	Ulsan Hyundai	Seongnam
20:00 KST	Kim Dong-hyun (yellow card) 7'; Yeon Je-woon (yellow card) 39'; Na Sang-ho 55' (pen.); Lim Seung-gyeom (yellow card) 80'; Seongnam FC	Report	Júnior 36', 40' (pen.); Jung Seung-hyun (yellow card) 90+3'; Lee Chung-yong (yellow card) 90+5'; Ulsan Hyundai	Stadium: Tancheon Sports Complex; Attendance: 0 Referee: Lee Dong-jun; Assistant referees: Kwak Seung-soon; Kim Ji-wook; Fourth official: Kim Hee-gon Video assistant referee: Choi Dae-woo Assistant video assistant referees: Kim Woo-sung

30 August 2020 18	Ulsan Hyundai	3–0	FC Seoul	Ulsan
17:30 KST	Lee Chung-yong 18'; Júnior 41'; Kim Tae-hwan (yellow card) 74'; Jung Hoon-sung 90+4'; Ulsan Hyundai	Report	Cha Oh-yeon (yellow card) 70'; FC Seoul	Stadium: Ulsan Munsu Football Stadium; Attendance: 0 Referee: Park Byung-jin; Assistant referees: Park Sang-jun; Gu Eun-seok; Fourth official: Ahn Jae-hoon Video assistant referee: Kim Sung-ho Assistant video assistant referees: Seo Dong-jin

6 September 2020 19	Ulsan Hyundai	1–1	Gwangju FC	Ulsan
19:00 KST	Bulthuis (yellow card) 25'; Júnior 58'; Ulsan Hyundai	Report	Willyan 23', (red card) 70'; Lee Min-ki (yellow card) 55'; Lim Min-hyeok (yellow card) 66'; Gwangju FC	Stadium: Ulsan Munsu Football Stadium; Attendance: 0 Referee: Choi Hyun-jai; Assistant referees: Yoon Kwang-yeol; Yang Jae-yong; Fourth official: Lee Dong-jun Video assistant referee: Kim Jong-hyeok Assistant video assistant referees: Kim Dong-in

12 September 2020 20	Ulsan Hyundai	1–1	Daegu FC	Ulsan
19:00 KST	Kim Jae-woo 46' (o.g.); Won Du-jae (yellow card) 75'; Ulsan Hyundai	Report	Cesinha 62' (pen.); Daegu FC	Stadium: Ulsan Munsu Football Stadium; Attendance: 0 Referee: Kim Jong-hyeok; Assistant referees: Lee Jung-min; Kang Do-jun; Fourth official: Jeong Dong-sik Video assistant referee: Lee Dong-jun Assistant video assistant referees: Choi Dae-woo

15 September 2020 21	Jeonbuk Hyundai Motors	2–1	Ulsan Hyundai	Jeonju
19:00 KST	Barrow 2'; Son Jun-ho (yellow card) 46'; Han Kyo-won 63'; Jeonbuk Hyundai Motors	Report	Bulthuis (yellow card) 70'; Sin Jin-ho (yellow card) 88'; Júnior 90+6' (pen.); Ulsan Hyundai	Stadium: Jeonju World Cup Stadium; Attendance: 0 Referee: Lee Dong-jun; Assistant referees: Kim Gye-yong; Gu Eun-seok; Fourth official: Kim Woo-sung Video assistant referee: Kim Sung-ho Assistant video assistant referees: Kim Do-yeon

20 September 2020 22	Incheon United	0–1	Ulsan Hyundai	Incheon
15:00 KST	Yang Joon-a (yellow card) 90+4'; Incheon United	Report	Júnior 26'; Ulsan Hyundai	Stadium: Incheon Football Stadium; Attendance: 0 Referee: Kim Yong-woo; Assistant referees: Noh Su-yong; Yang Jae-yong; Fourth official: Ahn Jae-hoon Video assistant referee: Song Min-seok Assistant video assistant referees: Shin Yong-jun

27 September 2020 23	Daegu FC	2–2	Ulsan Hyundai	Daegu
16:30 KST	Sin Chang-moo (yellow card) 20'; Cesinha 22'; Park Han-bin (yellow card) 36', (goal) 90'; Daegu FC	Report	Seol Young-woo (yellow card) 25'; Júnior 28'; Kim Tae-hwan 50'; Ulsan Hyundai	Stadium: DGB Daegu Bank Park; Attendance: 0 Referee: Kim Woo-sung; Assistant referees: Kwak Seung-soon; Jang Jong-pil; Fourth official: Kim Jung-hoo Video assistant referee: Park Byung-jin Assistant video assistant referees: Shin Yong-jun

2 October 2020 24	Ulsan Hyundai	4–1	Sangju Sangmu	Ulsan
17:00 KST	Jung Seung-hyun 32', 36'; Johnsen 59', 79'; Ulsan Hyundai	Report	Jung Won-jin 3'; Sangju Sangmu	Stadium: Ulsan Munsu Football Stadium; Attendance: 0 Referee: Park Byung-jin; Assistant referees: Bang Ki-yeol; Kim Gye-yong; Fourth official: Kim Do-yeon Video assistant referee: Kim Sung-ho Assistant video assistant referees: Cho Ji-um

18 October 2020 25	Pohang Steelers	4–0	Ulsan Hyundai	Pohang
19:00 KST	Iljutcenko 3', 71'; Lee Gwang-hyuk (yellow card) 11'; Paločević 79', 80'; Pohang Steelers	Report	Jung Seung-hyun (yellow card) 22'; Bulthuis (red card) 57'; Bjørn Johnsen (red card) 62'; Ulsan Hyundai	Stadium: Pohang Steel Yard; Attendance: 2,453; Referee: Kim Woo-sung; Assistant referees: Park Sang-jun; Kwak Seung-soon; Fourth official: Chae Sang-hyeop Video assistant referee: Kim Sung-ho Assistant video assistant referees: Choi Dae-woo

25 October 2020 26	Ulsan Hyundai	0–1	Jeonbuk Hyundai Motors	Ulsan
16:30 KST	Yoon Bit-garam (yellow card) 24'; Seol Young-woo (yellow card) 69'; Ulsan Hyundai	Report	Barrow 64'; Jeonbuk Hyundai Motors	Stadium: Ulsan Munsu Football Stadium; Attendance: 6,973; Referee: Park Byung-jin; Assistant referees: Noh Su-yong; Kang Dong-ho; Fourth official: Kim Dae-yong Video assistant referee: Kim Jong-hyeok Assistant video assistant referees: Lim Jung-soo

1 November 2020 27	Ulsan Hyundai	3–0	Gwangju FC	Ulsan
15:00 KST	Yoon Bit-garam 34'; Júnior 36'; Lee Dong-gyeong 90'; Ulsan Hyundai	Report	Gwangju FC	Stadium: Ulsan Munsu Football Stadium; Attendance: 3,478; Referee: Kim Dae-yong; Assistant referees: Kim Gye-yong; Yang Jae-yong; Fourth official: Chae Sang-hyeop Video assistant referee: Kim Sung-ho Assistant video assistant referees: Lim Jung-soo

=== FA Cup ===
15 July 2020 Round of 16	Ulsan Hyundai	2–0	Gyeongju KHNP	Ulsan
19:30 KST	Johnsen 75'; Kim Tae-hwan (yellow card) 80'; Lee Dong-gyeong 90+3'		Hwang Ji-woong (yellow card) 90+2'	Stadium: Ulsan Munsu Football Stadium; Attendance: 0 Referee: Kim Dong-jin; Assistant referees: Lee Jung-min; Jang Jong-pil; Fourth official: Park Jong-myeong

29 July 2020 Quarter-finals	Ulsan Hyundai	3–0	Gangwon FC	Ulsan
19:30 KST	Yoon Bit-garam 52', 55'; Won Du-jae (yellow card) 72'; Lee Chung-yong 84'			Stadium: Ulsan Munsu Football Stadium; Attendance: 0 Referee: Kim Hee-gon; Assistant referees: Kwak Seung-soon; Kang Do-jun; Fourth official: Seo Dong-jin

23 September 2020 Semi-finals	Ulsan Hyundai	1–1 (a.e.t.) (4–3 p)	Pohang Steelers	Ulsan
19:30 KST	Sin Jin-ho (yellow card) 23'; Kim Tae-hwan (yellow card) 33'; Kim In-sung 53'; Jung Seung-hyun (yellow card) 54'		Kim Tae-hwan 12' (o.g.); Ha Chang-rae (yellow card) 56'	Stadium: Ulsan Munsu Football Stadium; Attendance: 0 Referee: Chae Sang-hyeop; Assistant referees: Lee Jung-min; Jang Jong-pil; Fourth official: Song Min-seok Video assistant referee: Kim Jong-hyeok Assistant video assistant referees: Cho Ji-um
	Penalties
	Johnsen (penalty scored); Won Du-jae (penalty scored); Kim In-sung (penalty missed); Yoon Bit-garam (penalty scored); Júnior (penalty missed); Jung Seung-hyun (penalty missed); Lee Dong-gyeong (penalty missed); Hong Chul (penalty scored)		(penalty missed) Iljutcenko; (penalty scored) Shim Dong-woon; (penalty scored) Kang Sang-woo; (penalty scored) Lee Seung-mo; (penalty missed) Paločević; (penalty missed) Kang Hyeon-mu; (penalty missed) Choi Young-jun; (penalty missed) Song Min-kyu

4 November 2020 First leg	Ulsan Hyundai	1–1	Jeonbuk Hyundai Motors	Ulsan
19:00 KST	Júnior 60'; Ulsan Hyundai Jo Hyeon-woo (South Korea) 21 GK; Seol Young-woo (South Korea) 66 RB; Jung Seung-hyun (South Korea) 15 CB; (yellow card) 51' Bulthuis (Netherlands) 4 CB; Hong Chul (South Korea) 32 LB; Won Du-jae (South Korea) 16 DM; (substituted off) 79' Kim In-sung (South Korea) 7 RM; Yoon Bit-garam (South Korea) 10 CM; (substituted off) 57' (C) Sin Jin-ho (South Korea) 8 CM; Bjørn Johnsen (Norway) 19 LM; Júnior (Brazil) 9 CF; Substitutes; Jo Su-huk (South Korea) 1 GK; Jeong Dong-ho (South Korea) 2 DF; Kim Kee-hee (South Korea) 44 DF; (substituted on) 57' Lee Dong-gyeong (South Korea) 14 MF; Koh Myong-jin (South Korea) 22 MF; (substituted on) 79' Lee Keun-ho (South Korea) 11 FW; Jung Hoon-sung (South Korea) 30 FW; Manager Kim Do-hoon (South Korea)		Murilo 50'; Jeonbuk Hyundai Motors GK 31 (South Korea) Song Bum-keun; RB 2 (South Korea) Lee Yong (substituted off) 70'; CB 26 (South Korea) Hong Jeong-ho; CB 92 (South Korea) Kim Min-hyeok; LB 32 (South Korea) Lee Ju-yong; DM 28 (South Korea) Son Jun-ho; RM 10 (Brazil) Murilo (substituted off) 64'; CM 13 (South Korea) Kim Bo-kyung (C) (substituted off) 84'; CM 17 (Japan) Kunimoto (yellow card) 90'; LM 37 (Sweden) Barrow; CF 9 (Brazil) Gustavo; Substitutes; GK 1 (South Korea) Lee Bum-young; DF 6 (South Korea) Choi Bo-kyung; DF 15 (South Korea) Ku Ja-ryong (substituted on) 64'; DF 25 (South Korea) Choi Chul-soon (substituted on) 70'; MF 14 (South Korea) Lee Seung-gi; MF 44 (South Korea) Shin Hyung-min; FW 11 (South Korea) Cho Gue-sung (substituted on) 84'; Manager (Portugal) José Morais	Stadium: Ulsan Munsu Football Stadium; Attendance: 2,760; Referee: Lee Dong-jun; Assistant referees: Yoon Kwang-yeol; Ji Seung-min; Fourth official: Seo Dong-jin Video assistant referee: Kim Sung-ho Assistant video assistant referees: Lim Jung-soo

8 November 2020 Second leg	Jeonbuk Hyundai Motors	2–1 (3–2 agg.)	Ulsan Hyundai	Jeonju
14:00 KST	Lee Seung-gi 53', 71'; Jeonbuk Hyundai Motors (yellow card) 90+2' Song Bum-keun (South Korea) 31 GK; (red card) 90+3' (C) Choi Chul-soon (South Korea) 25 RB; Hong Jeong-ho (South Korea) 26 CB; Kim Min-hyeok (South Korea) 92 CB; Lee Ju-yong (South Korea) 32 LB; Son Jun-ho (South Korea) 28 DM; Cho Gue-sung (South Korea) 11 RM; (substituted off) 81' Lee Seung-gi (South Korea) 14 CM; (substituted off) 14' Kunimoto (Japan) 17 CM; Kim Bo-kyung (South Korea) 13 LM; (substituted off) 89' (yellow card) 89' Gustavo (Brazil) 9 CF; Substitutes; Lee Bum-young (South Korea) 1 GK; Choi Bo-kyung (South Korea) 6 DF; Ku Ja-ryong (South Korea) 15 DF; (substituted on) 14' Murilo (Brazil) 10 MF; (substituted on) 81' Shin Hyung-min (South Korea) 44 MF; (substituted on) 89' Lee Dong-gook (South Korea) 20 FW; Lee Sung-yoon (South Korea) 29 FW; Manager José Morais (Portugal)		Júnior 4'; Ulsan Hyundai GK 21 (South Korea) Jo Hyeon-woo; RB 23 (South Korea) Kim Tae-hwan (C); CB 15 (South Korea) Jung Seung-hyun; CB 4 (Netherlands) Bulthuis (red card) 90+3'; LB 32 (South Korea) Hong Chul (substituted off) 55'; RM 72 (South Korea) Lee Chung-yong (substituted off) 56'; CM 16 (South Korea) Won Du-jae; CM 10 (South Korea) Yoon Bit-garam (substituted off) 76'; LM 7 (South Korea) Kim In-sung; CF 19 (Norway) Bjørn Johnsen; CF 9 (Brazil) Júnior; Substitutes; GK 1 (South Korea) Jo Su-huk; DF 44 (South Korea) Kim Kee-hee; DF 66 (South Korea) Seol Young-woo (substituted on) 55'; MF 8 (South Korea) Sin Jin-ho; MF 14 (South Korea) Lee Dong-gyeong (substituted on) 56'; FW 11 (South Korea) Lee Keun-ho (substituted on) 76'; FW 30 (South Korea) Jung Hoon-sung; Manager (South Korea) Kim Do-hoon	Stadium: Jeonju World Cup Stadium; Attendance: 8,798; Referee: Kim Jong-hyeok; Assistant referees: Noh Su-yong; Park Sang-jun; Fourth official: Kim Young-su Video assistant referee: Kim Woo-sung Assistant video assistant referees: Chae Sang-hyeop

=== AFC Champions League ===
Ulsan Hyundai qualified for the Champions League group stage as the runners-up of the 2019 K League 1 season. They were drawn in Group F with FC Tokyo, Perth Glory and Shanghai Shenhua. As the group winners, they advanced to the knockout stage, where they eliminated Melbourne Victory in the round of 16, Beijing FC in the quarter-finals, and Vissel Kobe in the semi-finals, respectively. In the final, held on 19 December 2020 in Al Wakrah, Qatar, they defeated Iranian side Persepolis 2–1 with a brace by Júnior Negrão to win their second Champions League title, and first since 2012.

==== Group stage ====
Pos	Team	Pld	W	D	L	GF	GA	GD	Pts	Qualification	ULS	TOK	SSH	PRG
1	(South Korea) Ulsan Hyundai	6	5	1	0	14	5	+9	16	Advance to knockout stage	—	1–1	3–1	2–0
2	(Japan) FC Tokyo	6	3	1	2	6	5	+1	10	Advance to knockout stage	1–2	—	0–1	1–0
3	(China) Shanghai Shenhua	6	2	1	3	9	13	−4	7		1–4	1–2	—	3–3
4	(Australia) Perth Glory	6	0	1	5	5	11	−6	1		1–2	0–1	1–2	—

Source: AFC

11 February 2020 1	Ulsan Hyundai (South Korea)	1–1	(Japan) FC Tokyo	Ulsan, South Korea
19:30 KST	Davidson (yellow card) 78'; Adaílton 82' (o.g.); Ulsan Hyundai	Live Report; Stats Report	Oliveira 64'; FC Tokyo	Stadium: Ulsan Munsu Football Stadium; Attendance: 3,350; Referee: Hettikamkanamge Perera (Sri Lanka); Assistant referees: Palitha Hemathunga (Sri Lanka); Sanjeewa Wellabada (Sri Lanka); Fourth official: Jansen Foo (Singapore); MVP: Júnior Negrão (Ulsan Hyundai)

21 November 2020 (Note: The AFC announced on 29 January 2020 that the group stage matches which Chinese teams were supposed to host on matchdays 1, 2, and 3 would be switched with the corresponding away matches due to the COVID-19 pandemic in China.) 2	Ulsan Hyundai (South Korea)	3–1	(China) Shanghai Shenhua	Doha, Qatar
16:00 UTC+3	Yoon Bit-garam 19', 41'; Kim Kee-hee 63'; Ulsan Hyundai	Live Report; Stats Report	Jiang Shenglong (yellow card) 22'; Wen Jiabao (yellow card) 45'; Zhu Jianrong 89'; Shanghai Shenhua	Stadium: Education City Stadium; Attendance: 0 Referee: Khamis Al-Marri (Qatar); Assistant referees: Yousuf Al-Shamari (Qatar); Zahy Al-Shammari (Qatar); Fourth official: Abdulrahman Al-Jassim (Qatar); MVP: Yoon Bit-garam (Ulsan Hyundai)

24 November 2020 (Note: Due to the COVID-19 pandemic in South Korea, the order of matches between Ulsan Hyundai and Perth Glory was switched.) 3	Perth Glory (Australia)	1–2	(South Korea) Ulsan Hyundai	Doha, Qatar
16:00 UTC+3	Fornaroli (yellow card) 6'; Wilson (yellow card) 48'; Stynes 71', (yellow card) 82'; Perth Glory	Live Report; Stats Report	Jeong Dong-ho (yellow card) 14'; Kim Kee-hee (yellow card) 88'; Kim In-sung 89'; Júnior 90+3'; Ulsan Hyundai	Stadium: Education City Stadium; Attendance: 0 Referee: Nazmi Nasaruddin (Malaysia); Assistant referees: Mohd Yusri Muhamad (Malaysia); Ronnie Koh Min Kiat (Singapore); Fourth official: Mohd Amirul Izwan Yaacob (Malaysia); MVP: Kim In-sung (Ulsan Hyundai)

27 November 2020 4	Ulsan Hyundai (South Korea)	2–0	(Australia) Perth Glory	Doha, Qatar
13:00 UTC+3	Lee Chung-yong (yellow card) 83'; Kim In-sung 87'; Júnior 89'; Ulsan Hyundai	Live Report; Stats Report	Nick Sullivan (yellow card) 90'; Perth Glory	Stadium: Education City Stadium; Attendance: 0 Referee: Sivakorn Pu-udom (Thailand); Assistant referees: Rawut Nakrit (Thailand); Rashid Al-Ghaithi (Oman); Fourth official: Ilgiz Tantashev (Uzbekistan); MVP: Koh Myong-jin (Ulsan Hyundai)

30 November 2020 5	FC Tokyo (Japan)	1–2	(South Korea) Ulsan Hyundai	Doha, Qatar
13:00 UTC+3	Nagai 1'; Ogawa (yellow card) 45+2'; Oumari (yellow card) 52'; Morishige (yellow card) 54'; FC Tokyo	Live Report; Stats Report	Yoon Bit-garam (yellow card) 32', (goal) 44', 85'; Ulsan Hyundai	Stadium: Education City Stadium; Attendance: 0 Referee: Khamis Al-Marri (Qatar); Assistant referees: Yousuf Al-Shamari (Qatar); Zahy Al-Shammari (Qatar); Fourth official: Saoud Al-Athbah (Qatar); MVP: Yoon Bit-garam (Ulsan Hyundai)

3 December 2020 6	Shanghai Shenhua (China)	1–4	(South Korea) Ulsan Hyundai	Doha, Qatar
13:00 UTC+3	Li Shuai (yellow card) 73'; Bi Jinhao 60'; Shanghai Shenhua	Live Report; Stats Report	Park Jeong-in 3'; Lee Sang-heon 24'; Johnsen 75' (pen.), 90'; Sin Jin-ho (yellow card) 84'; Ulsan Hyundai	Stadium: Jassim bin Hamad Stadium; Attendance: 0 Referee: Muhammad Taqi (Singapore); Assistant referees: Ronnie Koh Min Kiat (Singapore); Rawut Nakrit (Thailand); Fourth official: Adham Makhadmeh (Jordan); MVP: Bjørn Maars Johnsen (Ulsan Hyundai)

==== Knockout stage ====
===== Round of 16 =====
6 December 2020 Round of 16	Ulsan Hyundai (South Korea)	3–0	(Australia) Melbourne Victory	Doha, Qatar
17:00 UTC+3	Sin Jin-ho (yellow card) 56'; Johnsen 65', 86'; Won Du-jae (yellow card) 74', (goal) 77'; Ulsan Hyundai	Live Report; Stats Report	Butterfield (yellow card) 30'; Anderson (yellow card) 59'; Melbourne Victory	Stadium: Education City Stadium; Attendance: 0 Referee: Turki Al-Khudhayr (Saudi Arabia); Assistant referees: Mohammed Al-Abakry (Saudi Arabia); Khalaf Al-Shammari (Saudi Arabia); Fourth official: Nawaf Shukralla (Bahrain); MVP: Bjørn Maars Johnsen (Ulsan Hyundai)

===== Quarter-finals =====
10 December 2020 Quarter-finals	Ulsan Hyundai (South Korea)	2–0	(China) Beijing FC	Al Wakrah, Qatar
13:00 UTC+3	Lee Keun-ho (yellow card) 2'; Júnior 21' (pen.), 42'; Kim Tae-hwan (yellow card) 55'; Ulsan Hyundai	Live Report; Stats Report	Kim Min-jae (yellow card) 20'; Wang Gang (yellow card) 57'; Beijing FC	Stadium: Al Janoub Stadium; Attendance: 0 Referee: Mohammed Abdulla Hassan Mohamed (United Arab Emirates); Assistant referees: Mohamed Al-Hammadi (United Arab Emirates); Hasan Al-Mahri (United Arab Emirates); Fourth official: Hettikamkanamge Perera (Sri Lanka); Fifth official: Mohd Yusri Muhamad (Malaysia) Video assistant referee: Muhammad Taqi (Singapore) Assistant video assistant referees: Mohd Amirul Izwan Yaacob (Malaysia) Assistant video assistant referees2: Nawaf Shukralla (Bahrain); MVP: Júnior Negrão (Ulsan Hyundai)

===== Semi-finals =====
13 December 2020 Semi-finals	Ulsan Hyundai (South Korea)	2–1 (a.e.t.)	(Japan) Vissel Kobe	Doha, Qatar (Note: The semi-final of the East Region was originally scheduled to be played at Al Janoub Stadium, Al Wakrah, but was moved to Jassim Bin Hamad Stadium, Doha, to ensure optimum pitch conditions for the semi-final and the final.)
13:00 UTC+3	Koh Myong-jin (yellow card) 27'; Johnsen 81'; Kim In-sung (yellow card) 97'; Jung Seung-hyun (yellow card) 104'; Júnior 119' (pen.); Ulsan Hyundai	Live Report; Stats Report	Yamaguchi 52'; Yamakawa (yellow card) 54'; Sasaki (yellow card) 90+6'; Vissel Kobe	Stadium: Jassim bin Hamad Stadium; Attendance: 0 Referee: Nawaf Shukralla (Bahrain); Assistant referees: Mohamed Salman (Bahrain); Abdulla Al-Rowaimi (Bahrain); Fourth official: Hettikamkanamge Perera (Sri Lanka); Fifth official: Hasan Al-Mahri (United Arab Emirates) Video assistant referee: Mohammed Abdulla Hassan Mohamed (United Arab Emirates) Assistant video assistant referees: Khamis Al-Marri (Qatar) Assistant video assistant referees2: Mohd Amirul Izwan Yaacob (Malaysia); MVP: Yoon Bit-garam (Ulsan Hyundai)

===== Final =====
19 December 2020 Final	Persepolis (Iran)	1–2	(South Korea) Ulsan Hyundai	Al Wakrah, Qatar
15:00 UTC+3	Abdi 45'; Persepolis Hamed Lak (Iran) 81 GK; (substituted off) 74' Mehdi Shiri (Iran) 17 RB; Hossein Kanaanizadegan (Iran) 6 CB (C) Jalal Hosseini (Iran) 4 CB; Saeid Aghaei (Iran) 77 LB; Milad Sarlak (Iran) 66 CM; Ahmad Nourollahi (Iran) 8 CM; Siamak Nemati (Iran) 88 RM; Bashar Resan (Iraq) 5 AM; (substituted off) 90' Omid Alishah (Iran) 2 LM; Mehdi Abdi (Iran) 16 CF; Substitutes; Amir Mohammad Yousefi (Iran) 34 GK; Božidar Radošević (Croatia) 44 GK; Mohammad Ansari (Iran) 15 DF; Ehsan Hosseini (Iran) 38 DF; Kamal Kamyabinia (Iran) 11 MF; (substituted on) 90' Ali Shojaei (Iran) 23 MF; Saeid Hosseinpour (Iran) 26 MF; Aria Barzegar (Iran) 25 FW; (substituted on) 74' Arman Ramezani (Iran) 36 FW; Manager Yahya Golmohammadi (Iran)	Live Report; Stats Report	Júnior 45+4', 55' (pen.); Ulsan Hyundai GK 1 (South Korea) Jo Su-huk; RB 23 (South Korea) Kim Tae-hwan; CB 44 (South Korea) Kim Kee-hee; CB 4 (Netherlands) Dave Bulthuis (yellow card) 79'; LB 6 (South Korea) Park Joo-ho (substituted off) 72'; DM 16 (South Korea) Won Du-jae; RM 72 (South Korea) Lee Chung-yong (substituted off) 72'; CM 10 (South Korea) Yoon Bit-garam; CM 8 (South Korea) Sin Jin-ho (C) (substituted off) 83'; LM 7 (South Korea) Kim In-sung (substituted off) 90+1'; CF 9 (Brazil) Júnior Negrão (yellow card) 82' (substituted off) 83'; Substitutes; GK 25 (South Korea) Seo Ju-hwan; DF 2 (South Korea) Jeong Dong-ho; DF 15 (South Korea) Jung Seung-hyun (substituted on) 83'; DF 66 (South Korea) Seol Young-woo (substituted on) 90+1'; DF 77 (South Korea) Hong Chul (substituted on) 72'; MF 22 (South Korea) Koh Myong-jin; MF 17 (South Korea) Kim Sung-joon; MF 98 (South Korea) Lee Sang-heon; FW 11 (South Korea) Lee Keun-ho (substituted on) 72'; FW 19 (Norway) Bjørn Maars Johnsen (substituted on) 83'; Manager (South Korea) Kim Do-hoon	Stadium: Al Janoub Stadium; Attendance: 8,517; Referee: Abdulrahman Al-Jassim (Qatar); Assistant referees: Ramzan Al-Naemi (Qatar); Saud Al-Maqaleh (Qatar); Fourth official: Hettikamkanamge Perera (Sri Lanka); Fifth official: Mohd Yusri Muhamad (Malaysia) Video assistant referee: Khamis Al-Marri (Qatar) Assistant video assistant referees: Adham Makhadmeh (Jordan) Assistant video assistant referees2: Mohd Amirul Izwan Yaacob (Malaysia); MVP: Sin Jin-ho (Ulsan Hyundai)

== Statistics ==
=== Appearances ===
No.	Pos	Nat	Player	Total		K League 1		FA Cup		Champions League	
No.	Pos	Nat	Player	Apps	Goals	Apps	Goals	Apps	Goals	Apps	Goals
Goalkeepers
1	GK	(South Korea) KOR	Jo Su-huk	9	0	0	0	0	0	9	0
21	GK	(South Korea) KOR	Jo Hyeon-woo	32	0	27	0	5	0	0	0
25	GK	(South Korea) KOR	Seo Ju-hwan	1	0	0	0	0	0	1	0
88	GK	(South Korea) KOR	Min Dong-hwan	0	0	0	0	0	0	0	0
Defenders
2	DF	(South Korea) KOR	Jeong Dong-ho	9	0	1	0	1	0	5+2	0
3	DF	(Australia) AUS	Davidson	7	0	4	0	0	0	3	0
4	DF	(Netherlands) NED	Bulthuis	33	0	20+2	0	4	0	7	0
5	DF	(South Korea) KOR	Kim Min-duk	3	0	0	0	0	0	3	0
6	DF	(South Korea) KOR	Park Joo-ho	21	0	9+3	0	1	0	6+2	0
15	DF	(South Korea) KOR	Jung Seung-hyun	32	2	23	2	4	0	2+3	0
20	DF	(South Korea) KOR	Yun Young-sun	0	0	0	0	0	0	0	0
23	DF	(South Korea) KOR	Kim Tae-hwan	35	1	24+1	1	3+1	0	3+3	0
32 (77)	DF	(South Korea) KOR	Hong Chul	20	0	10+3	0	4	0	0+3	0
44	DF	(South Korea) KOR	Kim Kee-hee	22	1	11+1	0	2	0	8	1
66	DF	(South Korea) KOR	Seol Young-woo	22	0	14	0	1+1	0	3+3	0
Midfielders
8	MF	(South Korea) KOR	Sin Jin-ho	34	2	21+2	2	2	0	7+2	0
10	MF	(South Korea) KOR	Yoon Bit-garam	37	10	21+3	4	4+1	2	8	4
14	MF	(South Korea) KOR	Lee Dong-gyeong	24	3	3+15	2	2+3	1	1	0
16	MF	(South Korea) KOR	Won Du-jae	35	1	20+3	0	5	0	4+3	1
17	MF	(South Korea) KOR	Kim Sung-joon	7	0	3	0	1	0	2+1	0
22	MF	(South Korea) KOR	Koh Myong-jin	24	0	9+5	0	1+1	0	3+5	0
72	MF	(South Korea) KOR	Lee Chung-yong	32	5	17+3	4	2+2	1	7+1	0
98	MF	(South Korea) KOR	Lee Sang-heon	15	2	8	1	0	0	5+2	1
A player who left the club on loan during the season.
7	FW	(South Korea) KOR	Kim In-sung	38	7	18+6	4	3+1	1	6+4	2
9	FW	(Brazil) BRA	Júnior	41	35	23+4	26	3+2	2	7+2	7
11	FW	(South Korea) KOR	Lee Keun-ho	23	0	1+11	0	1+2	0	3+5	0
19	FW	(Norway) NOR	Bjørn Johnsen	31	11	3+15	5	4	1	3+6	5
30	FW	(South Korea) KOR	Jung Hoon-sung	9	1	2+3	1	1	0	2+1	0
99	FW	(South Korea) KOR	Park Jeong-in	10	1	6+2	0	0	0	2	1

Last updated: 19 December 2020.
Source: K League, AFC

=== Goal scorers ===
The list is sorted by shirt number when total goals are equal.

Rnk	Pos	No.	Player	K League 1	FA Cup	Champions League	Total
1	FW	9	(Brazil) Júnior	26	2	7	35
2	FW	19	(Norway) Bjørn Johnsen	5	1	3	11
3	MF	10	(South Korea) Yoon Bit-garam	4	2	4	10
4	FW	7	(South Korea) Kim In-sung	4	1	2	7
5	MF	72	(South Korea) Lee Chung-yong	4	1	0	5
6	MF	14	(South Korea) Lee Dong-gyeong	2	1	0	3
7	DF	15	(South Korea) Jung Seung-hyun	2	0	0	2
8	MF	98	(South Korea) Lee Sang-heon	1	0	1	2
8	MF	8	(South Korea) Sin Jin-ho	1	0	0	1
8	FW	30	(South Korea) Jung Hoon-sung	1	0	0	1
8	DF	23	(South Korea) Kim Tae-hwan	1	0	0	1
8	DF	44	(South Korea) Kim Kee-hee	0	0	1	1
8	FW	99	(South Korea) Park Jeong-in	0	0	1	1
8	MF	16	(South Korea) Won Du-jae	0	0	1	1
Own Goals				3	0	1	4
TOTALS				54	8	19	81

Last updated: 19 December 2020.
Source: Soccerway, AFC

=== Goal assists ===
The list is sorted by shirt number when total goals are equal.

Rnk	Pos	No.	Player	K League 1	FA Cup	Champions League	Total
1	FW	7	(South Korea) Kim In-sung	5	1	2	8
2	DF	23	(South Korea) Kim Tae-hwan	4	2	0	6
3	MF	8	(South Korea) Sin Jin-ho	3	0	2	5
4	DF	32	(South Korea) Hong Chul	4	0	0	4
4	MF	10	(South Korea) Yoon Bit-garam	0	1	3	4
5	MF	72	(South Korea) Lee Chung-yong	3	0	0	3
5	FW	11	(South Korea) Lee Keun-ho	3	0	0	3
5	FW	9	(Brazil) Júnior	2	0	1	3
6	MF	22	(South Korea) Koh Myong-jin	2	0	0	2
6	FW	19	(Norway) Bjørn Johnsen	1	0	1	2
6	MF	16	(South Korea) Won Du-jae	1	0	1	2
6	FW	30	(South Korea) Jung Hoon-sung	0	0	2	2
7	DF	44	(South Korea) Kim Kee-hee	1	0	0	1
7	DF	6	(South Korea) Park Joo-ho	1	0	0	1
7	DF	66	(South Korea) Seol Young-woo	1	0	0	1
7	MF	14	(South Korea) Lee Dong-gyeong	1	0	0	1
7	FW	99	(South Korea) Park Jeong-in	1	0	0	1
7	MF	98	(South Korea) Lee Sang-heon	0	0	1	1
TOTALS				33	4	13	50

Last updated: 13 December 2020.
Source: K League

=== Clean sheets ===
The list is sorted by shirt number when total clean sheets are equal.

Rnk	No.	Player	K League 1	FA Cup	Champions League	Total
1	21	(South Korea) Jo Hyeon-woo	11	2	0	13
2	1	(South Korea) Jo Su-huk	0	0	3	3
TOTALS			11	2	3	16

Last updated: 10 December 2020.
Source: K League

=== Hat-tricks ===
Player	Against	Result	Date	Competition	Ref
(Brazil) Júnior	(South Korea) Incheon United	4–1 (H)	4 July 2020	K League 1	

(H) – Home; (A) – Away

=== Disciplinary record ===
N	P	Nat.	Name	K League 1			FA Cup			Champions League			Total			Notes
N	P	Nat.	Name	Yellow card	Second yellow card	Red card	Yellow card	Second yellow card	Red card	Yellow card	Second yellow card	Red card	Yellow card	Second yellow card	Red card	Notes
21	GK	(South Korea)	Jo Hyeon-woo	2									2			
21	DF	(South Korea)	Jeong Dong-ho							1			1			
3	DF	(Australia)	Davidson	1						1			2			
5	DF	(Netherlands)	Bulthuis	4		1	1		1	1			6		2	
6	DF	(South Korea)	Park Joo-ho	1									1			
15	DF	(South Korea)	Jung Seung-hyun	6			1			1			8			
23	DF	(South Korea)	Kim Tae-hwan	3	1		2			1			6	1		
32	DF	(South Korea)	Hong Chul	1									1			
44	DF	(South Korea)	Kim Kee-hee	1		1				1			2		1	
66	DF	(South Korea)	Seol Young-woo	2									2			
8	MF	(South Korea)	Sin Jin-ho	3			1			2			6			
10	MF	(South Korea)	Yoon Bit-garam	1						1			2			
14	MF	(South Korea)	Lee Dong-gyeong	2									2			
16	MF	(South Korea)	Won Du-jae	3			1			1			5			
22	MF	(South Korea)	Koh Myong-jin	3						1			4			
72	MF	(South Korea)	Lee Chung-yong	2						1			3			
98	MF	(South Korea)	Lee Sang-heon	1									1			
7	FW	(South Korea)	Kim In-sung	2						1			3			
9	FW	(Brazil)	Júnior							1			1			
11	FW	(South Korea)	Lee Keun-ho	1						1			2			
19	FW	(Norway)	Bjørn Johnsen			1									1	

Last updated: 19 December 2020
Source: Soccerway
Only competitive matches
(yellow card) = Number of bookings; (second yellow card) = Number of sending offs after a second yellow card; (red card) = Number of sending offs by a direct red card.
