= Choi Jun =

South Korean footballer (born 1999)

- Choi in 2026

Personal information
- Date of birth: 17 April 1999 (age 27)
- Place of birth: Ulsan, South Korea
- Height: 1.77 m (5 ft 10 in)
- Positions: Right-back; midfielder

Team information
- Current team: FC Seoul
- Number: 16

Youth career
- 2015-2017: Ulsan Hyundai
- 2018–2019: Yonsei University

Senior career*
Years	Team	Apps	(Gls)
2020	Ulsan Hyundai	0	(0)
2020	→ Gyeongnam FC (loan)	18	(1)
2021-2023	Busan IPark	92	(4)
2024–	FC Seoul	102	(2)

International career^{‡}
2018-2019	South Korea U20	23	(3)
2021-2023	South Korea U23	10	(2)
2025–	South Korea	6	(0)
Medal record
Men's football
Representing South Korea
Asian Games
Gold medal – first place	2022 Hangzhou	Team
FIFA U-20 World Cup
Runner-up	2019 Poland
AFC U-19 Championship
Runner-up	2018 Indonesia
- * Club domestic league appearances and goals as of 8 November 2026 ‡ National team caps and goals as of 17 November 2026

- Choi Jun
- Hangul: 최준
- Hanja: 崔俊
- RR: Choe Jun
- MR: Ch'oe Chun

Choi Jun (Korean: 최준; born 17 April 1999) is a South Korean professional footballer who plays as a right-back for K League 1 club FC Seoul and the South Korea national team.

== Club career ==
=== The beginnings ===
A product of K League 1 Ulsan Hyundai's academy, Choi played for Yonsei University. In 2020 he was drafted by Ulsan, after his performances for the national youth teams gained the attention of scouts from several European clubs. He was unable to make his league debut due to the presence of veterans Park Joo-ho (on the left side) and Kim Tae-hwan (on the right) and the suspension of professional sports in light of the COVID-19 pandemic. Instead, he was loaned to K League 2 side Gyeongnam, where he consequently played his first professional season.

==== Gyeongnam ====
He made his professional debut on July 1, 2020, playing the entirety of a Korean FA Cup match against Jeonnam Dragons, with his side eventually suffering a 4–0 away loss. Being at the start of his senior career, Choi initially had mixed fortunes in Changwon, registering two assists but also five yellow cards in his first ten matches with Gyeongnam. However, as the season progressed he was praised for showing a hard-working attitude and a good chemistry with his team-mates on the right wing (alternatively, Ko Kyung-min or Negueba). On October 25, 2020, he registered his first goal ever, by netting the winner in a 4–3 away win against Bucheon FC 1995.

As Gyeongnam gained a spot in the promotion play-offs, Choi had the opportunity to take part in two more matches: a 1–1 draw against Daejeon Hana Citizen (Gyeongnam advanced to the following round due to a better placement in the regular league table) and the final against Suwon FC. In this occasion, Choi scored the opening goal of the match, but then An Byong-jun equalized, scoring a penalty kick in the final moments of injury time and giving Suwon the promotion to K League 1, again due to better placement.

Choi closed his experience in Changwon having registered 20 league appearances and two goals.

=== Busan IPark ===
Once returned to Ulsan, Choi soon joined Busan IPark (who had just been relegated in K League 2) on a permanent basis, together with fellow team-mates Jung Hoon-sung and Lee Sang-heon, as part of the operation that brought Lee Dong-jun to the "Horangi".

=== FC Seoul ===
On 5 January 2024, Jun joined FC Seoul.

== International career ==
He has frequently represented South Korea at Under-19 and Under-20 level.

In 2018, he took part both in the Toulon Tournament, where the South Korean selection was eliminated in the group stage, and the AFC Under-19 Championship, where his side reached the final before losing 1–2 to eventual winners Saudi Arabia.

In 2019, he was selected by head coach Chung Jung-yong to take part in the FIFA U-20 World Cup in Poland, being one of the only two players in South Korea's 21-men list (together with Jeong Ho-jin) who hadn't started their senior career, yet. Used as a left-back, he played every match of his side, assisting Oh Se-hun's winner against Japan in the round of 16 and scoring, in order, one penalty in South Korea's successful shoot-out against Senegal (in the quarter-finals) and the only goal of the victory against Ecuador in the semi-finals. As a result, he played a considerable role in the Taeguk Warriors' road to the tournament's final, then lost to Ukraine with the score of 3–1.

== Career statistics ==
=== Club ===
As of match played 8 November 2026

Appearances and goals by club, season and competition
Club	Season	League			Korea Cup		Continental		Other		Total	
Club	Season	Division	Apps	Goals	Apps	Goals	Apps	Goals	Apps	Goals	Apps	Goals
Ulsan Hyundai	2020	K League 1	0	0	0	0	—		—		0	0
Gyeongnam FC (loan)	2020	K League 2	18	1	1	0	—		2 (Note: Appearances in K League promotion play-offs)	1	21	2
Busan IPark	2021	K League 2	30	2	0	0	—		—		30	2
Busan IPark	2022	K League 2	31	0	1	0	—		—		32	0
Busan IPark	2023	K League 2	31	2	0	0	—		2	1	33	3
Busan IPark	Total		92	4	1	0	—		2	1	95	5
FC Seoul	2024	K League 1	36	1	2	0	—		—		38	1
FC Seoul	2025	K League 1	32	1	0	0	6 (Note: Appearances in AFC Champions League Elite)	1	—		38	2
FC Seoul	2026	K League 1	34	0	1	0	6 (Note: four appearances in AFC Champions League Elite, two appearance in AFC Champions League Two)	0	—		41	0
FC Seoul	Total		102	2	3	0	12	1	—		117	3
Career total			212	7	5	0	12	1	4	2	233	10

=== International ===
As of match played 17 November 2026

Appearances and goals by national team and year
National team	Year	Apps	Goals
South Korea
South Korea	2025	1	0
South Korea	2026	5	0
Total		6	0

== Honours ==
FC Seoul

- K League 1: 2026

South Korea U19

- AFC U-19 Championship runner-up: 2018

South Korea U20

- FIFA U-20 World Cup runner-up: 2019

South Korea U23

- Asian Games: 2022

Individual

- K League 2 Best XI: 2023
