= Kim Kee-hee =

South Korean footballer (born 1989)

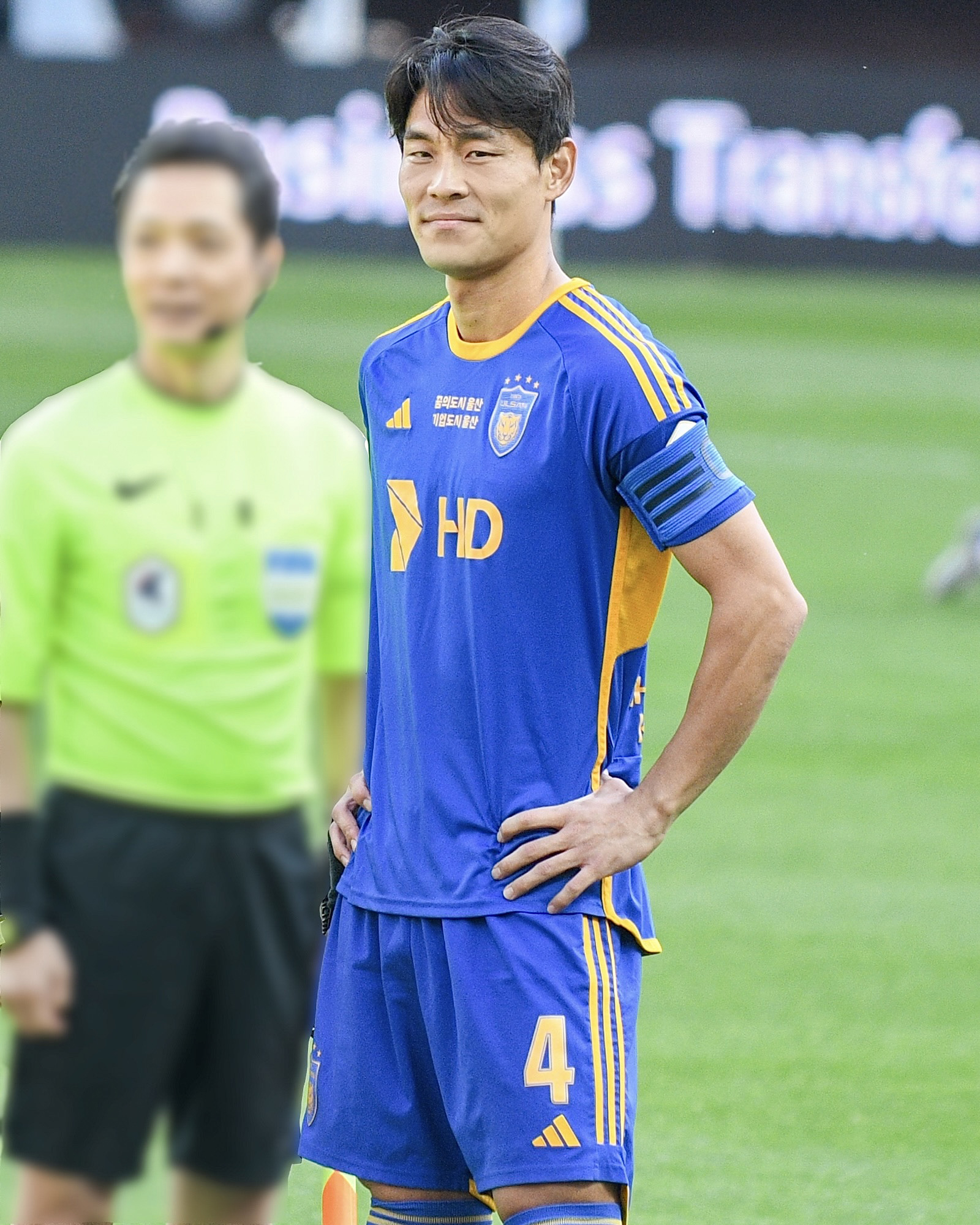
- Kim in 2024

Personal information
- Date of birth: 13 July 1989 (age 37)
- Place of birth: Busan, South Korea
- Height: 1.87 m (6 ft 1 1/2 in)
- Positions: Centre-back; defensive midfielder

Team information
- Current team: Seattle Sounders FC
- Number: 20

Youth career
- 2005–2007: Bukyeong High School
- 2008–2010: Hongik University

Senior career*
Years	Team	Apps	(Gls)
2011–2013	Daegu FC	29	(2)
2012–2013	→ Al-Sailiya (loan)	20	(0)
2013–2015	Jeonbuk Hyundai Motors	80	(0)
2016–2017	Shanghai Shenhua	45	(2)
2018–2019	Seattle Sounders FC	59	(0)
2020–2024	Ulsan Hyundai	112	(1)
2025–	Seattle Sounders FC	22	(0)

International career
2011–2012	South Korea U23	5	(2)
2012–2017	South Korea	23	(0)
Medal record
Olympic Games
Bronze medal – third place	2012 London	Team
- * Club domestic league appearances and goals as of 18:21, 21 October 2026 (UTC)

- Kim Kee-hee
- Hangul: 김기희
- Hanja: 金基熙
- RR: Gim Gihui
- MR: Kim Kihŭi

Kim Kee-hee (Korean: 김기희; Korean pronunciation: [kim.ɡi.ɦi] or [kim] [ki.ɦi]; born 13 July 1989) is a South Korean professional footballer who plays as a centre back for Seattle Sounders FC in Major League Soccer. He can also be fielded as a defensive midfielder. Kim has played for teams in the K-League, Qatar Stars League, Chinese Super League and Major League Soccer. He has also represented South Korea at the national level.

== Club career ==
=== Daegu ===
Kim initially played University League at Hongik University from 2008 to 2010. Kim was then drafted in the second round of the 2011 K-League draft by Daegu FC. Kim made his professional debut on 5 March 2011, playing the full 90 minutes of Daegu's opening game of the 2011 K-League season against Gwangju FC, which ended in a 2–3 loss for Daegu FC.

==== Loan to Al-Sailiya ====
On 26 September 2012, Kim joined the newly promoted Qatar Stars League club Al-Sailiya on a loan deal.

=== Jeonbuk Hyundai ===
Kim joined fellow K-League side Jeonbuk Hyundai Motors in 2013 and would help the team to win two successive K-League titles.

=== Shanghai Shenhua ===
On 19 February 2016, Kim moved to Chinese Super League club Shanghai Shenhua from Jeonbuk Hyundai Motors for a reported transfer fee of US$6 million. Kim's agent had described the deal as the "biggest transfer in Korean history". On 5 March 2016, he made his debut for the club in a 1–1 draw against Yanbian Funde.

=== Seattle Sounders FC ===
On 27 February 2018, Kim was signed by Seattle Sounders FC of Major League Soccer using targeted allocation money. He won MLS Cup 2019 with Seattle and planned to sign a new contract for the 2020 season, but was unable to come to financial terms with the club.

=== Ulsan Hyundai ===
On 26 February 2020, Kim was signed by Ulsan Hyundai of K League 1.

=== Return to Seattle Sounders FC ===
On 28 January 2025, Kim rejoined Seattle Sounders FC on a one-year contract with an option for the following season. He is expected to be used as a rotation player behind the starting center-backs due to the team's participation in multiple competitions.

== International career ==
In 2011, Kim was selected for the South Korea U-23 national team that participated in the 2012 King's Cup, an annual tournament held in Thailand.

In 2012, Kim won the bronze medal with South Korea U-23 in the 2012 London Olympics, which was the first Olympic medal ever in Korean football history, and he was granted exemption to two years of mandatory military service like the rest of the team.

== Career statistics ==
As of match played 19 June 2025

Appearances and goals by club, season and competition
Club	Season	League			National cup (Note: Includes Korean FA Cup, Chinese FA Cup, U.S. Open Cup)		League cup (Note: Includes Korean League Cup)		Continental		Other		Total	
Club	Season	Division	Apps	Goals	Apps	Goals	Apps	Goals	Apps	Goals	Apps	Goals	Apps	Goals
Daegu FC	2011	K-League	12	0	0	0	2	0	—		—		14	0
Daegu FC	2012	K-League	17	2	0	0	0	0	—		—		17	2
Daegu FC	Total		29	2	0	0	2	0	—		—		31	2
Al-Sailiya SC	2012–13	Qatar Stars League	20	0	0	0	0	0	—		—		20	0
Jeonbuk Hyundai Motors	2013	K League Classic	19	0	3	1	—		0	0	—		22	1
Jeonbuk Hyundai Motors	2014	K League Classic	28	0	1	0	—		7 (Note: Appearance(s) in AFC Champions League)	0	—		36	0
Jeonbuk Hyundai Motors	2015	K League Classic	33	0	1	0	—		8	1	—		42	1
Jeonbuk Hyundai Motors	Total		80	0	5	1	—		15	1	—		100	2
Shanghai Shenhua	2016	Chinese Super League	30	0	3	0	—		—		—		33	0
Shanghai Shenhua	2017	Chinese Super League	15	1	1	1	—		1	0	—		17	2
Shanghai Shenhua	Total		45	1	4	1	—		1	0	—		50	2
Seattle Sounders FC	2018	Major League Soccer	29	0	0	0	—		2	0	1 (Note: Appearances in MLS Cup Playoffs)	0	32	0
Seattle Sounders FC	2019	Major League Soccer	30	0	0	0	—		—		4	0	34	0
Seattle Sounders FC	Total		59	0	0	0	—		2	0	5	0	66	0
Ulsan Hyundai	2020	K League 1	12	0	2	0	—		8	1	—		22	1
Ulsan Hyundai	2021	K League 1	36	1	2	0	—		8	0	2 (Note: Appearance(s) in FIFA Club World Cup)	1	48	2
Ulsan Hyundai	2022	K League 1	15	0	2	0	—		—		—		17	0
Ulsan Hyundai	2023	K League 1	27	0	0	0	—		6	0	—		33	0
Ulsan Hyundai	2024	K League 1	22	0	3	0	—		1	0	—		26	0
Ulsan Hyundai	Total		112	1	9	0	—		23	1	2	1	146	3
Seattle Sounders FC	2025	Major League Soccer	9	0	0	0	—		0	0	1	0	10	0
Career total			354	4	18	2	2	0	41	2	8	1	421	9

== Honours ==
Jeonbuk Hyundai Motors

- K League 1: 2014, 2015

Shanghai Greenland Shenhua

- Chinese FA Cup: 2017

Seattle Sounders FC

- MLS Cup: 2019
- Leagues Cup: 2025

Ulsan Hyundai

- K League 1: 2022, 2023, 2024
- AFC Champions League: 2020

South Korea U23

- Summer Olympic Games Bronze Medal: 2012

South Korea

- EAFF East Asian Cup: 2015

Individual

- K League 1 Best XI: 2015, 2024
