= Dave Bulthuis =

Dutch football player

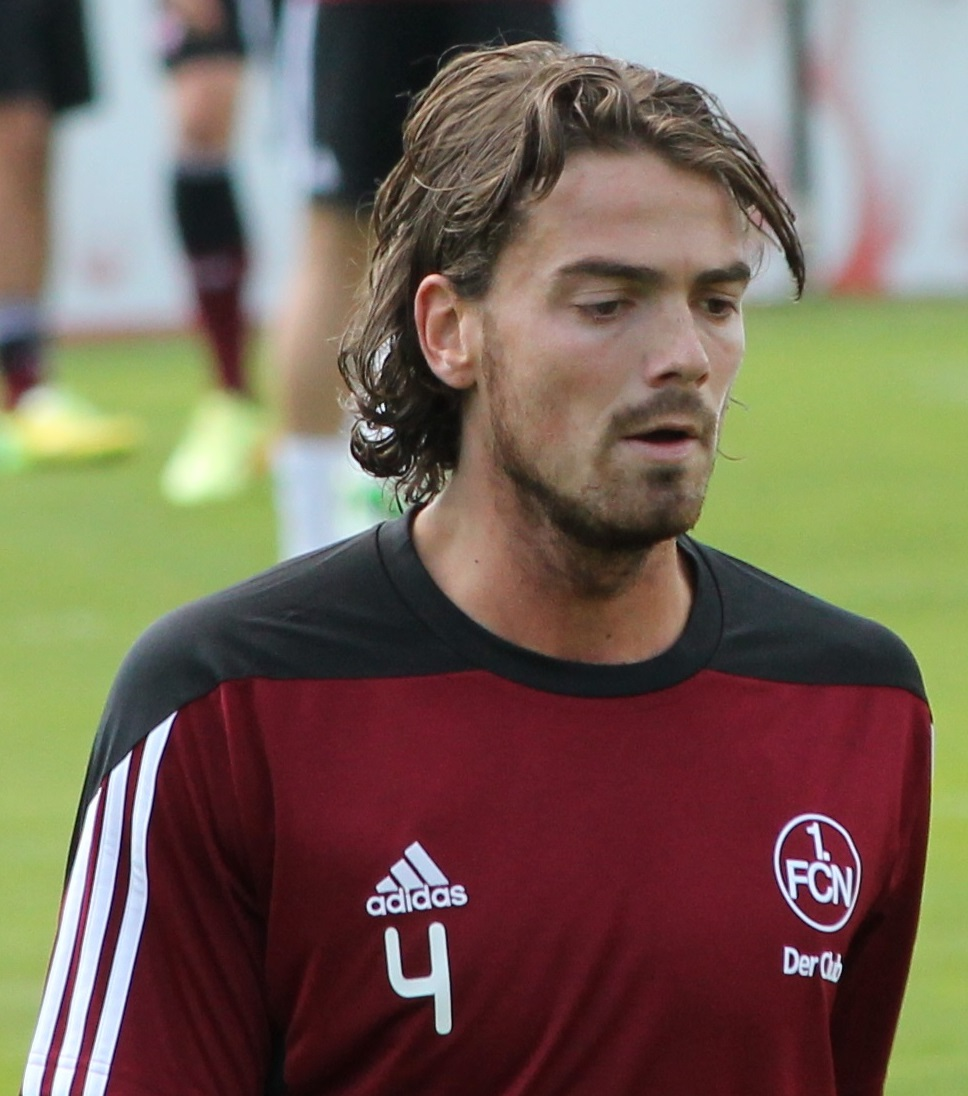

Personal information
- Full name: Davy Bulthuis
- Date of birth: 28 June 1990 (age 36)
- Place of birth: Purmerend, Netherlands
- Height: 1.87 m (6 ft 2 in)
- Positions: Centre back; left back

Youth career
- 2000-2002: VPV Purmersteijn
- 2002-2009: Volendam
- 2009-2010: Jong Utrecht

Senior career*
| Years | Team | Apps | (Gls) |
| 2009–2014 | Utrecht | 84 | (9) |
| 2014–2017 | Nürnberg | 67 | (3) |
| 2014–2017 | Nürnberg II | 5 | (0) |
| 2017 | Gabala | 4 | (0) |
| 2018 | Heerenveen | 24 | (2) |
| 2019–2021 | Ulsan Hyundai | 71 | (4) |
| 2022–2024 | Suwon Samsung Bluewings | 55 | (1) |
| 2024- | Rood-Wit Zaanstad | | |
Medal record
Ulsan Hyundai
| Winner | AFC Champions League | 2020 |
- * Club domestic league appearances and goals

Dave Bulthuis (born 28 June 1990 in Purmerend) is a Dutch football player who last played for Rood-Wit Zaanstad.

== Club career ==
In 2010 season, Bulthuis made his professional debut for FC Utrecht in the Eredivisie. He moved abroad to play for German 2. Bundesliga side FC Nürnberg in summer 2014.

On 7 July 2017, Bulthuis signed a three-year contract with Azerbaijan Premier League side Gabala FK.

In January 2019, he left SC Heerenveen for Ulsan Hyundai. He played for Ulsan Hyundai 3 seasons, has 71 games and 4 goals. Bulthuis has been among the K League's top center backs since his arrival here in 2019. In 2020, he helped Ulsan to the AFC Champions League title. He was selected on the annual K League 1 Best XI squad for 2021 season.

In January 2022, Jeonbuk Hyundai Motors announced that they signed Bulthuis. He played for this club until the end of 2023 K League 1 season.

== Personal life ==
Oguzhan Özyakup is a brother-in-law of Bulthuis and their father-in-law is Richard Witschge.

== Career statistics ==
As of match played on 22 October 2023

Appearances and goals by club, season and competition
| Club | Season | League | | | National Cup | | Continental | | Other | | Total | |
| Club | Season | Division | Apps | Goals | Apps | Goals | Apps | Goals | Apps | Goals | Apps | Goals |
|---|---|---|---|---|---|---|---|---|---|---|---|---|
| Utrecht | 2010–11 | Eredivisie | 1 | 0 | 0 | 0 | — | | — | | 1 | 0 |
| Utrecht | 2011–12 | Eredivisie | 25 | 2 | 1 | 0 | — | | — | | 26 | 2 |
| Utrecht | 2012–13 | Eredivisie | 34 | 3 | 1 | 0 | — | | — | | 35 | 3 |
| Utrecht | 2013–14 | Eredivisie | 24 | 4 | 3 | 0 | 1 (Note: Appearance(s) in UEFA Europa League) | 0 | — | | 28 | 4 |
| Utrecht | Total | | 84 | 9 | 5 | 0 | 1 | 0 | 0 | 0 | 90 | 9 |
| Nürnberg | 2014–15 | 2. Bundesliga | 16 | 1 | 1 | 0 | — | | — | | 17 | 1 |
| Nürnberg | 2015–16 | 2. Bundesliga | 28 | 1 | 3 | 0 | — | | 2 (Note: Appearances in Promotion/relegation play-offs) | 0 | 33 | 1 |
| Nürnberg | 2016–17 | 2. Bundesliga | 23 | 1 | 1 | 0 | — | | — | | 24 | 1 |
| Nürnberg | Total | | 67 | 3 | 5 | 0 | 0 | 0 | 2 | 0 | 74 | 3 |
| Nürnberg II | 2014–15 | Regionalliga | 5 | 0 | — | | — | | — | | 5 | 0 |
| Gabala | 2017–18 | Azerbaijan Premier League | 4 | 0 | 0 | 0 | 4 | 0 | — | | 8 | 0 |
| Heerenveen | 2017–18 | Eredivisie | 5 | 0 | 0 | 0 | — | | — | | 5 | 0 |
| Ulsan Hyundai | 2019 | K League 1 | 19 | 1 | 1 | 0 | 6 (Note: Appearance(s) in AFC Champions League) | 0 | — | | 26 | 1 |
| Ulsan Hyundai | 2020 | K League 1 | 22 | 0 | 4 | 0 | 7 (Note: Appearance(s) in AFC Champions League and FIFA Club World Cup) | 0 | — | | 33 | 4 |
| Ulsan Hyundai | 2021 | K League 1 | 30 | 3 | 1 | 0 | 7 | 0 | — | | 38 | 1 |
| Ulsan Hyundai | Total | | 71 | 4 | 6 | 0 | 20 | 0 | 0 | 0 | 97 | 6 |
| Suwon Samsung Bluewings | 2022 | K League 1 | 35 | 0 | 3 | 0 | — | | 2 (Note: Appearances in Promotion/relegation play-offs) | 0 | 40 | 0 |
| Suwon Samsung Bluewings | 2023 | K League 1 | 18 | 1 | 0 | 0 | — | | — | | 18 | 1 |
| Suwon Samsung Bluewings | Total | | 53 | 1 | 3 | 0 | 0 | 0 | 0 | 0 | 56 | 1 |
| Career total | | | 258 | 14 | 18 | 0 | 18 | 0 | 4 | 0 | 298 | 14 |

== Honours ==
=== Individual ===
- K League 1 Best XI: 2021

=== Club ===
Ulsan Hyundai

- AFC Champions League: 2020
