= Jeong Dong-ho =

South Korean footballer

Personal information
- Full name: Jeong Dong-ho
- Date of birth: 7 March 1990 (age 36)
- Place of birth: Busan, South Korea
- Height: 1.75 m (5 ft 9 in)
- Position: Full-back

Team information
- Current team: Suwon FC
- Number: 2

Youth career
- 2006–2008: Bookyung High School

Senior career*
| Years | Team | Apps | (Gls) |
| 2009–2013 | Yokohama F. Marinos | 5 | (0) |
| 2011 | → Gainare Tottori (loan) | 25 | (1) |
| 2012 | → Hangzhou Greentown (loan) | 28 | (0) |
| 2014–2020 | Ulsan Hyundai | 108 | (2) |
| 2020– | Suwon FC | 74 | (2) |

International career^{‡}
| 2008–2009 | South Korea U-20 | 6 | (0) |
| 2010–2012 | South Korea U-23 | 5 | (0) |
| 2015 | South Korea | 5 | (0) |
- * Club domestic league appearances and goals as of 16 October 2022 ‡ National team caps and goals as of 9 August 2015

- Jeong Dong-ho
- Hangul: 정동호
- Hanja: 丁東浩
- RR: Jeong Dongho
- MR: Chŏng Tongho

Jeong Dong-ho (Korean: 정동호; Korean pronunciation: [tɕʌŋ.doŋ.ɦo] or [tɕʌŋ] [toŋ.ɦo]; born 7 March 1990) is a South Korean footballer. He currently plays for Suwon.

In January 2011, Jeong joined J2 League side Gainare Tottori on loan until 1 January 2012.

In January 2012, Jeong was loaned to Chinese Super League side Hangzhou Greentown until the end of 2012 league season.

== Club statistics ==
As of 16 October 2022

| Club performance | | | League | | Cup | | League Cup | | Continental | | Total | |
| Season | Club | League | Apps | Goals | Apps | Goals | Apps | Goals | Apps | Goals | Apps | Goals |
| Japan | | | League | | Cup | | League Cup | | AFC | | Total | |
|---|---|---|---|---|---|---|---|---|---|---|---|---|
| 2009 | Yokohama F. Marinos | J1 League | 5 | 0 | 1 | 0 | 2 | 0 | - | | 8 | 0 |
| 2010 | Yokohama F. Marinos | J1 League | 0 | 0 | 0 | 0 | 0 | 0 | - | | 0 | 0 |
| 2011 | Gainare Tottori | J2 League | 25 | 1 | 2 | 0 | - | | - | | 27 | 1 |
| China | | | League | | Cup | | League Cup | | AFC | | Total | |
| 2012 | Hangzhou Greentown | Chinese Super League | 28 | 0 | 3 | 0 | - | | - | | 31 | 0 |
| Japan | | | League | | Cup | | League Cup | | AFC | | Total | |
| 2013 | Yokohama F. Marinos | J1 League | 1 | 0 | 1 | 0 | 1 | 0 | - | | 3 | 0 |
| South Korea | | | League | | Cup | | League Cup | | AFC | | Total | |
| 2014 | Ulsan Hyundai | K League | 19 | 0 | 2 | 0 | - | | 2 | 0 | 23 | 0 |
| 2015 | Ulsan Hyundai | K League | 28 | 2 | 4 | 0 | - | | - | | 32 | 2 |
| 2016 | Ulsan Hyundai | K League | 29 | 0 | 4 | 0 | - | | - | | 33 | 0 |
| 2017 | Ulsan Hyundai | K League | 4 | 0 | 1 | 0 | - | | 1 | 0 | 6 | 0 |
| 2018 | Ulsan Hyundai | K League | 11 | 0 | 3 | 0 | - | | 2 | 0 | 16 | 0 |
| 2019 | Ulsan Hyundai | K League | 15 | 0 | 1 | 0 | - | | 6 | 0 | 22 | 0 |
| 2020 | Ulsan Hyundai | K League | 1 | 0 | 1 | 0 | - | | 7 | 0 | 9 | 0 |
| 2021 | Suwon FC | K League | 24 | 0 | 1 | 0 | - | | - | | 25 | 0 |
| 2022 | Suwon FC | K League | 21 | 2 | 0 | 0 | - | | - | | 21 | 2 |
| Total | Japan | | 31 | 1 | 4 | 0 | 3 | 0 | 0 | 0 | 38 | 1 |
| Total | China | | 28 | 0 | 3 | 0 | 0 | 0 | 0 | 0 | 31 | 0 |
| Total | South Korea | | 152 | 4 | 16 | 0 | 0 | 0 | 18 | 0 | 187 | 4 |
| Career total | | | 211 | 5 | 24 | 0 | 3 | 0 | 18 | 0 | 256 | 5 |
