= Won Du-jae =

South Korean footballer

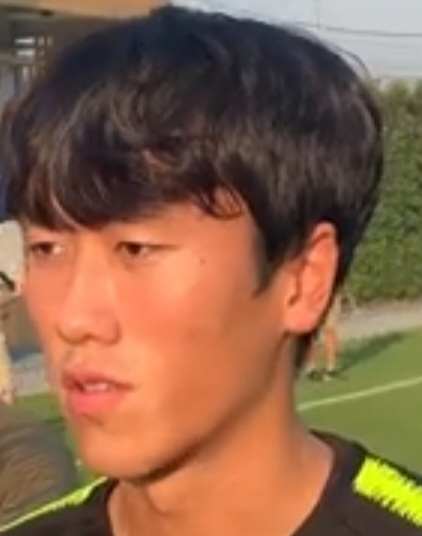
- Won in 2020

Personal information
- Date of birth: 18 November 1997 (age 28)
- Place of birth: Seoul, South Korea
- Height: 1.87 m (6 ft 2 in)
- Positions: Defensive midfielder; sweeper

Team information
- Current team: Shimizu S-Pulse
- Number: 6

College career
Years	Team	Apps	(Gls)
2016–2017	Hanyang University		

Senior career*
Years	Team	Apps	(Gls)
2017–2019	Avispa Fukuoka	68	(2)
2020–2024	Ulsan HD	79	(1)
2023–2024	→ Gimcheon Sangmu (draft)	46	(2)
2024–2026	Khor Fakkan	35	(0)
2026–	Shimizu S-Pulse	3	(0)

International career^{‡}
2015–2016	South Korea U20	3	(0)
2019–2021	South Korea U23	17	(1)
2020–	South Korea	11	(0)
Medal record
Representing South Korea
Men's football
AFC U-23 Championship
Winner	2020 Thailand
- * Club domestic league appearances and goals as of 7 November 2026 ‡ National team caps and goals as of 14 November 2025

Won Du-jae (Korean: 원두재; Hanja: 元斗才; born 18 November 1997) is a South Korean professional footballer. He plays as a defensive midfielder or a sweeper for Shimizu S-Pulse and the South Korea national team.

== Club career ==
In the summer of 2017, Won dropped out of Hanyang University and moved to Japan to join J2 League club Avispa Fukuoka. After playing as a defensive midfielder and a centre-back for Fukuoka for two and a half years, he came back to his country and joined K League 1 side Ulsan Hyundai. Ulsan usually used him as a defensive midfielder, and he played as a centre-back when his rear teammates were injured. Ulsan fans felt he looked better when he played as a midfielder. He helped the club win the 2020 AFC Champions League and the 2022 K League 1. He enlisted in Gimcheon Sangmu, a military football club and a K League 2 club, to serve his mandatory military service in 2023. He was nominated for the K League 2 Most Valuable Player award by leading Sangmu to the league title as a captain, but lost to Valdívia. After being discharged from Sangmu in July 2024, he transferred to UAE Pro League club Khor Fakkan.

== International career ==
Won played for South Korea under-23s at the 2020 AFC U-23 Championship and the 2020 Summer Olympics. At the AFC U-23 Championship, he won the title and was named the Most Valuable Player.

== Career statistics ==
=== Club ===
As of 7 November 2026

Appearances and goals by club, season and competition
Club	Season	League			National cup		League cup		Continental		Other		Total	
Club	Season	Division	Apps	Goals	Apps	Goals	Apps	Goals	Apps	Goals	Apps	Goals	Apps	Goals
Avispa Fukuoka	2017	J2 League	18	2	0	0	—		—		2 (Note: Appearances in Promotion Playoffs to J1)	0	20	2
Avispa Fukuoka	2018	J2 League	17	0	1	0	—		—		—		18	0
Avispa Fukuoka	2019	J2 League	33	0	2	0	—		—		—		35	0
Avispa Fukuoka	Total		68	2	3	0	—		—		2	0	73	2
Ulsan HD	2020	K League 1	23	0	5	0	—		7 (Note: Appearances in AFC Champions League)	1	—		35	1
Ulsan HD	2021	K League 1	30	1	1	0	—		3	0	2 (Note: Appearances in FIFA Club World Cup)	0	36	1
Ulsan HD	2022	K League 1	21	0	3	1	—		4	0	—		28	1
Ulsan HD	2024	K League 1	5	0	2	0	—		—		—		7	0
Ulsan HD	Total		79	1	11	1	—		14	1	2	0	106	3
Gimcheon Sangmu (draft)	2023	K League 2	34	1	1	0	—		—		—		35	1
Gimcheon Sangmu (draft)	2024	K League 1	12	1	1	0	—		—		—		13	1
Gimcheon Sangmu (draft)	Total		46	2	2	0	—		—		—		48	2
Khor Fakkan	2024–25	UAE Pro League	23	0	1	0	—		—		—		24	0
Khor Fakkan	2025–26	UAE Pro League	12	0	2	0	1	0	—		—		15	0
Khor Fakkan	Total		35	0	3	0	1	0	—		—		39	0
Shimizu S-Pulse	2026–27	J1 League	3	0	0	0	1	0	—		—		4	0
Career total			231	5	19	1	2	0	14	1	4	0	270	7

== Honours ==
Ulsan HD

- AFC Champions League: 2020
- K League 1: 2022

Gimcheon Sangmu

- K League 2: 2023

South Korea U23

- AFC U-23 Championship: 2020

Individual

- AFC U-23 Championship Most Valuable Player: 2020
- Korean FA Young Player of the Year: 2020
- K League 2 Best XI: 2023
