= Sin Jin-ho =

South Korean footballer (born 1988)

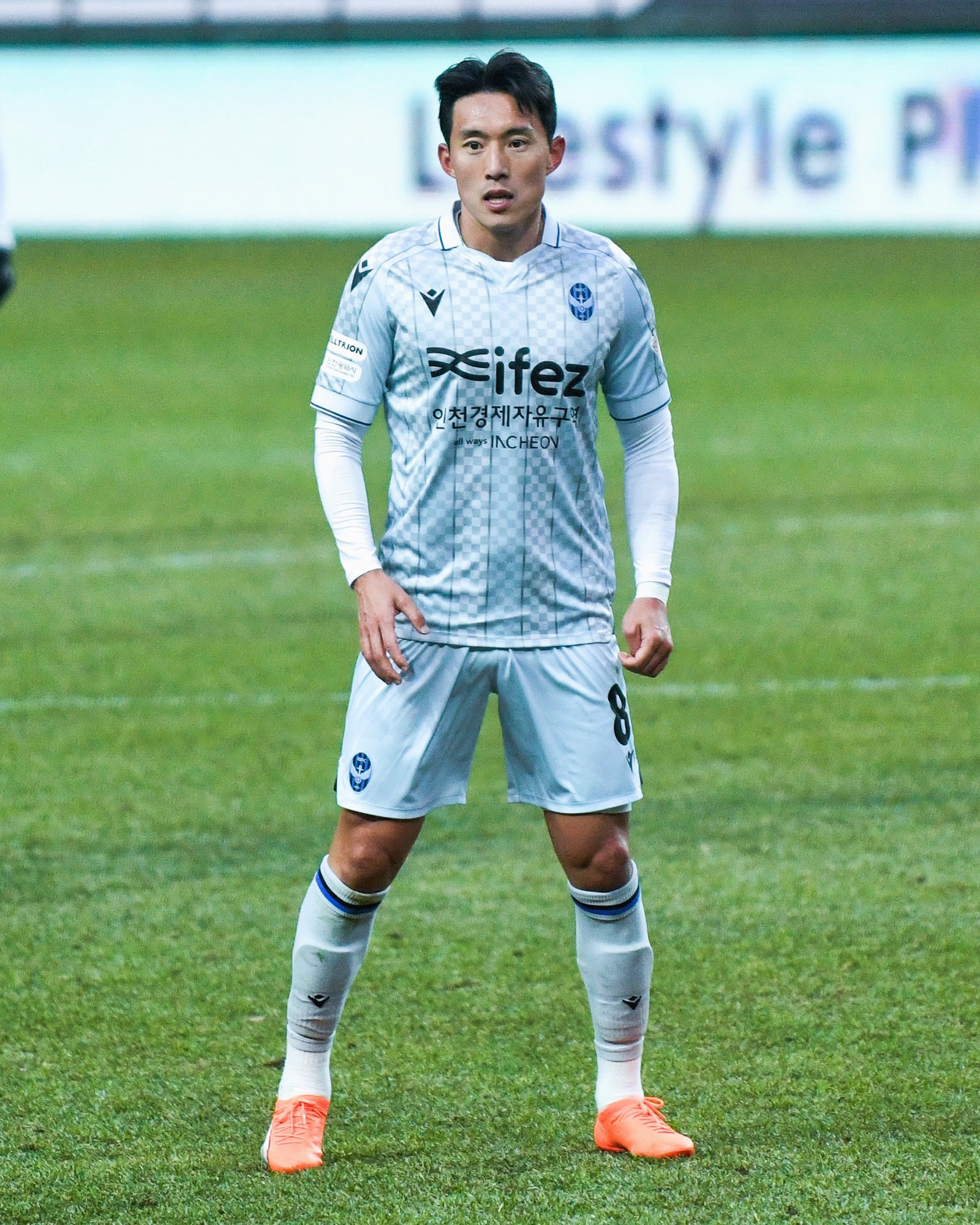
- Sin in 2023

Personal information
- Date of birth: 7 September 1988 (age 38)
- Place of birth: Guri, South Korea
- Height: 1.77 m (5 ft 10 in)
- Position: Attacking midfielder

Team information
- Current team: Yongin FC
- Number: 6

Senior career*
Years	Team	Apps	(Gls)
2011–2016	Pohang Steelers	62	(6)
2013–2014	→ Qatar SC (loan)	25	(4)
2014–2015	→ Al-Sailiya (loan)	14	(0)
2015	→ Emirates Club (loan)	9	(1)
2016–2018	FC Seoul	40	(3)
2016–2017	→ Sangju Sangmu (army)	35	(1)
2019–2020	Ulsan Hyundai	46	(2)
2021–2022	Pohang Steelers	68	(6)
2023–2025	Incheon United	67	(5)
2026–	Yongin FC	13	(0)
Medal record
Ulsan Hyundai
Winner	AFC Champions League	2020
- * Club domestic league appearances and goals as of 6 August 2026

- Sin Jin-ho
- Hangul: 신진호
- Hanja: 申塡灝
- RR: Sin Jinho
- MR: Sin Chinho

Sin Jin-ho (Korean: 신진호; Hanja: 申塡灝; born 7 September 1988) is a South Korean professional footballer who plays as a midfielder and captain for K League 2 club, Yongin FC.

== Club career ==
=== Pohang Steelers ===
Sin Jin-ho attended 'Pohang Steel Technical High School'. During his first year of high school, he studied abroad at a Brazilian professional soccer team Atlético as part of the Pohang Steelers' prospect development project. He was selected first by the Pohang Steelers in the 2007 K League Draft and then entered Yeungnam University .

After joining Pohang Steelers in 2011, he mainly participated in Korean League Cup competitions. On 6 April, he assisted Noh Byeong-jun's goal in the League Cup match against Daejeon Hana Citizen, recording his first assist since his debut. And in the regular league, he debuted as a substitute for Hwang Jin-seong in the 23rd minute of the second half in a game against Busan I'Park on 6 August. When Pohang Steelers legend Kim Ki-dong retired in 2012, Sin Jin-ho inherited his number 6. Although he suffered an ankle injury at the beginning of the season and was unable to play, he made his first appearance of the season in a game against Incheon United on 14 June and recorded an assist, quickly earning himself a starting position. In the game against Suwon Samsung Bluewings on 1 July, he scored 1 goal and 1 assist, along with his first goal in his professional debut, and was a major contributor to the team's 5-0 win. He played in 23 games in the 2012 season, scoring 1 goal and 6 assists in the regular league. In particular, in the FA Cup final against Gyeongnam FC, he scored a free kick that helped Park Sung- ho's golden backheader's winning goal just before the end of extra time, helping the team win the FA Cup.

In 2013, he played an active role as the team's starting midfielder, playing in all games up to the 20th round of the regular league (15 starters, 5 substitutes), 5 out of 6 AFC Champions League group stage games, and all games up to the FA Cup quarterfinals. In August, he moved to Qatar Sports Club of the Qatar Stars League on loan for one year. Sin re-joined Pohang Steelers in January 2021.

== Career statistics ==
=== Club ===
As of the start for 2026 season.

Appearances and goals by club, season and competition
Club	Season	League			National cup (Note: Includes KFA Cup, Emir of Qatar Cup, UAE President's Cup)		League cup (Note: Includes K-League Cup, Qatari Stars Cup, UAE League Cup)		Asia		Total	
Club	Season	Division	Apps	Goals	Apps	Goals	Apps	Goals	Apps	Goals	Apps	Goals
Pohang Steelers	2011	K League	2	0	1	0	4	0	—		7	0
Pohang Steelers	2012	K League	23	1	4	0	—		3	0	30	1
Pohang Steelers	2013	K League Classic	20	2	3	0	—		5	0	28	2
Pohang Steelers	2015	K League Classic	17	3	1	0	—		—		18	3
Pohang Steelers	Total		62	6	9	0	4	0	8	0	83	6
Qatar SC (loan)	2013–14	Qatar Stars League	25	4	2	0	4	2	—		31	6
Al-Sailiya (loan)	2014–15	Qatar Stars League	14	0	0	0	0	0	—		14	0
Emirates Club (loan)	2014–15	UAE Pro-League	9	1	1	0	0	0	—		10	1
FC Seoul	2016	K League Classic	6	1	0	0	—		4	0	10	1
FC Seoul	2018	K League 1	34	2	2	0	—		—		36	2
FC Seoul	Total		40	3	2	0	0	0	4	0	46	3
Sangju Sangmu (army)	2016	K League Classic	23	0	0	0	—		—		23	0
Sangju Sangmu (army)	2017	K League Classic	12	1	1	0	2	0	—		15	1
Sangju Sangmu (army)	Total		35	1	1	0	2	0	0	0	38	1
Ulsan Hyundai	2019	K League 1	24	1	1	0	—		6	0	31	1
Ulsan Hyundai	2020	K League 1	22	1	3	0	—		9	0	34	1
Ulsan Hyundai	Total		46	2	4	0	0	0	15	0	65	2
Pohang Steelers	2021	K League 1	32	4	2	0	—		0	0	34	4
Pohang Steelers	2022	K League 1	36	2	1	0	—		9	0	46	2
Pohang Steelers	Total		68	6	3	0	0	0	9	0	80	6
Incheon United	2023	K League 1	17	1	0	0	—		2	0	19	1
Incheon United	2024	K League 1	18	0	1	0	—		0	0	19	0
Incheon United	2025	K League 2	32	4	0	0	—		0	0	32	4
Incheon United	Total		67	5	1	0	0	0	2	0	70	5
Yongin FC	2026	K League 2	0	0	0	0	—				0	0
Career total			366	28	23	0	10	2	38	0	437	30

== Honours ==
Pohang Steelers

- K League Classic: 2013
- Korean FA Cup: 2012, 2013

FC Seoul

- K League Classic: 2016

Ulsan Hyundai

- AFC Champions League: 2020

Incheon United

- K League 2: 2025
