= Park Byung-hyun =

South Korean footballer (born 1993)

Personal information
- Full name: Park Byung-hyun
- Date of birth: 28 March 1993 (age 33)
- Place of birth: South Korea
- Height: 1.84 m (6 ft 1/2 in)
- Position: Defender

Youth career
- 2012–2015: Sangji University

Senior career*
Years	Team	Apps	(Gls)
2016–2018	Busan IPark	1	(0)
2017	→ Gimhae FC (loan)	16	(1)
2018	→ Daegu FC (loan)	23	(2)
2019–2022	Daegu FC	51	(1)
2020–2021	→ Gimcheon Sangmu (army)	12	(0)
2023–2024	Suwon FC	10	(0)
2024–2025	Chungnam Asan	13	(0)
- * Club domestic league appearances and goals as of 7 January 2026

Park Byung-hyun (Korean: 박병현; born 28 March 1993) is a South Korean footballer who plays as defender.

== Career ==
Park joined K League 1 side Busan IPark before 2016 season starts.
