= Jung Seung-hyun =

South Korean footballer (born 1994)

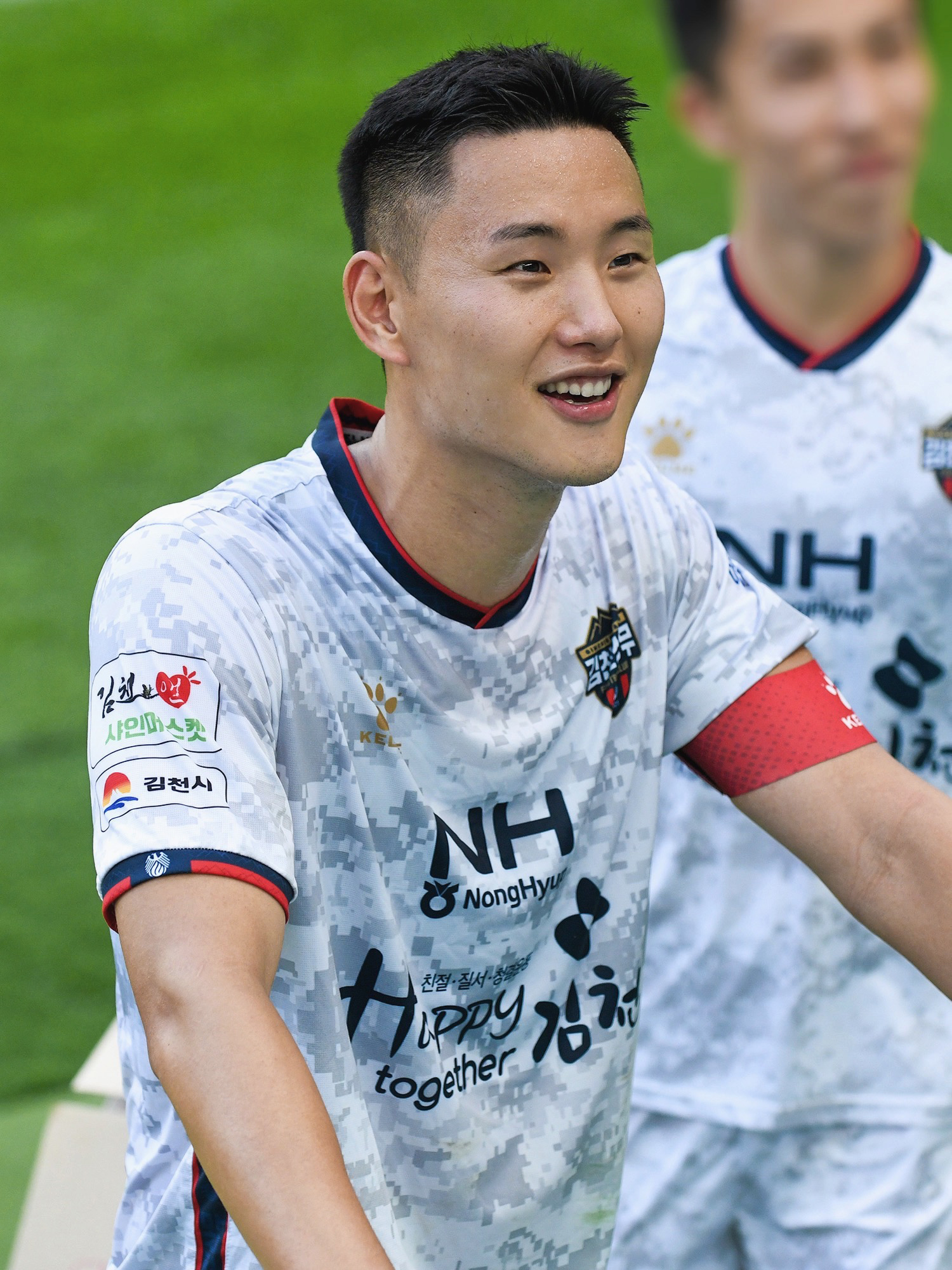
- Jung with Gimcheon Sangmu in 2022

Personal information
- Full name: Jung Seung-hyun
- Date of birth: 3 April 1994 (age 32)
- Place of birth: Icheon, Gyeonggi, South Korea
- Height: 1.88 m (6 ft 2 in)
- Position: Centre-back

Team information
- Current team: Ulsan HD
- Number: 15

Youth career
- 2010–2012: Ulsan Hyundai
- 2013–2014: Yonsei University

Senior career*
Years	Team	Apps	(Gls)
2015–2017	Ulsan Hyundai	49	(1)
2017–2018	Sagan Tosu	27	(2)
2018–2019	Kashima Antlers	24	(0)
2020–2023	Ulsan Hyundai	51	(3)
2021–2022	→ Gimcheon Sangmu (draft)	45	(6)
2024–2025	Al-Wasl	38	(4)
2025–	Ulsan HD	31	(2)

International career^{‡}
2015–2016	South Korea U23	21	(2)
2017–	South Korea	26	(1)
Medal record
Men's football
Representing South Korea
EAFF E-1 Football Championship
Winner	2017 Japan
- * Club domestic league appearances and goals as of 3 August 2026 ‡ National team caps and goals as of 10 September 2024

- Jung Seung-hyun
- Hangul: 정승현
- Hanja: 鄭昇炫
- RR: Jeong Seunghyeon
- MR: Chŏng Sŭnghyŏn

Jung Seung-hyun (also spelled Jeong Seung-hyeon, Korean: 정승현; Hanja: 鄭昇炫, born 3 April 1994) is a South Korean footballer who plays as defender for K League 1 club Ulsan HD and the South Korea national team. He won two AFC Champions Leagues with Kashima Antlers and Ulsan Hyundai.

== Club career ==
Jung joined Ulsan Hyundai before 2015 K League 1 starts. He made his debut in the league match against Incheon United on 19 April. In mid-2017, he left Ulsan to join Sagan Tosu. After just one season, Sagan swapped him for Mu Kanazaki to Kashima Antlers.

== International career ==
In May 2018 he was named in South Korea's preliminary 28 man squad for the 2018 FIFA World Cup in Russia.

== Club statistics ==
Updated to 22 March 2026.

Club	Season	League			National Cup (Note: Includes Korean FA Cup, Emperor's Cup, UAE President's Cup)		League Cup (Note: Includes J.League Cup, UAE League Cup)		Continental		Other		Total	
Club	Season	Division	Apps	Goals	Apps	Goals	Apps	Goals	Apps	Goals	Apps	Goals	Apps	Goals
Ulsan Hyundai	2015	K League 1	18	0	2	0	—		—		—		20	0
Ulsan Hyundai	2016	K League 1	19	1	3	0	—		—		—		22	1
Ulsan Hyundai	2017	K League 1	12	0	0	0	—		5 (Note: Appearances in AFC Champions League)	0	—		17	0
Ulsan Hyundai	Total		49	1	5	0	—		5	0	—		59	1
Sagan Tosu	2017	J1 League	16	1	—		—		—		—		16	1
Sagan Tosu	2018	J1 League	11	1	0	0	3	0	—		—		14	1
Sagan Tosu	Total		27	2	0	0	3	0	—		—		30	2
Kashima Antlers	2018	J1 League	11	0	2	0	0	0	6	0	3 (Note: Appearances in FIFA Club World Cup)	0	22	0
Kashima Antlers	2019	J1 League	13	0	2	0	4	0	7	0	—		26	0
Kashima Antlers	Total		24	0	4	0	4	0	13	0	3	0	48	0
Ulsan Hyundai	2020	K League 1	23	2	2	0	—		1	0	—		26	2
Ulsan Hyundai	2022	K League 1	5	0	1	0	—		—		—		6	0
Ulsan Hyundai	2023	K League 1	23	1	2	0	—		4	1	—		29	2
Ulsan Hyundai	Total		51	3	5	0	—		5	1	—		61	4
Gimcheon Sangmu (draft)	2021	K League 2	29	5	1	0	—		—		—		30	5
Gimcheon Sangmu (draft)	2022	K League 1	16	1	0	0	—		—		—		16	1
Gimcheon Sangmu (draft)	Total		45	6	1	0	—		—		—		46	6
Al-Wasl	2023–24	UAE Pro League	13	3	3	1	2	0	—		—		18	4
Al-Wasl	2024–25	UAE Pro League	25	1	3	0	2	1	10 (Note: Appearances in AFC Champions League Elite)	0	1 (Note: Appearance in UAE Super Cup)	0	41	2
Al-Wasl	Total		38	4	6	1	4	1	10	0	1	0	59	6
Ulsan HD	2025	K League 1	13	0	—		—		4	0	—		17	0
Ulsan HD	2026	K League 1	4	1	—		—		0	0	—		4	1
Ulsan HD	Total		17	1	0	0	0	0	4	0	0	0	21	1
Total			251	17	21	1	11	1	37	1	4	0	324	20

=== International ===
Scores and results list South Korea's goal tally first.

No.	Date	Venue	Opponent	Score	Result	Competition
1	21 November 2023	Shenzhen Universiade Sports Centre, Shenzhen, China	China	3–0	3–0	2026 FIFA World Cup qualification

== Honours ==
Kashima Antlers

- AFC Champions League: 2018

Ulsan HD

- AFC Champions League: 2020
- K League 1: 2022, 2023

Gimcheon Sangmu

- K League 2: 2021

Al-Wasl

- UAE Pro League: 2023-24
- UAE President's Cup: 2023-24

South Korea

- EAFF E-1 Football Championship: 2017
