= Kim In-sung =

South Korean footballer (born 1989)

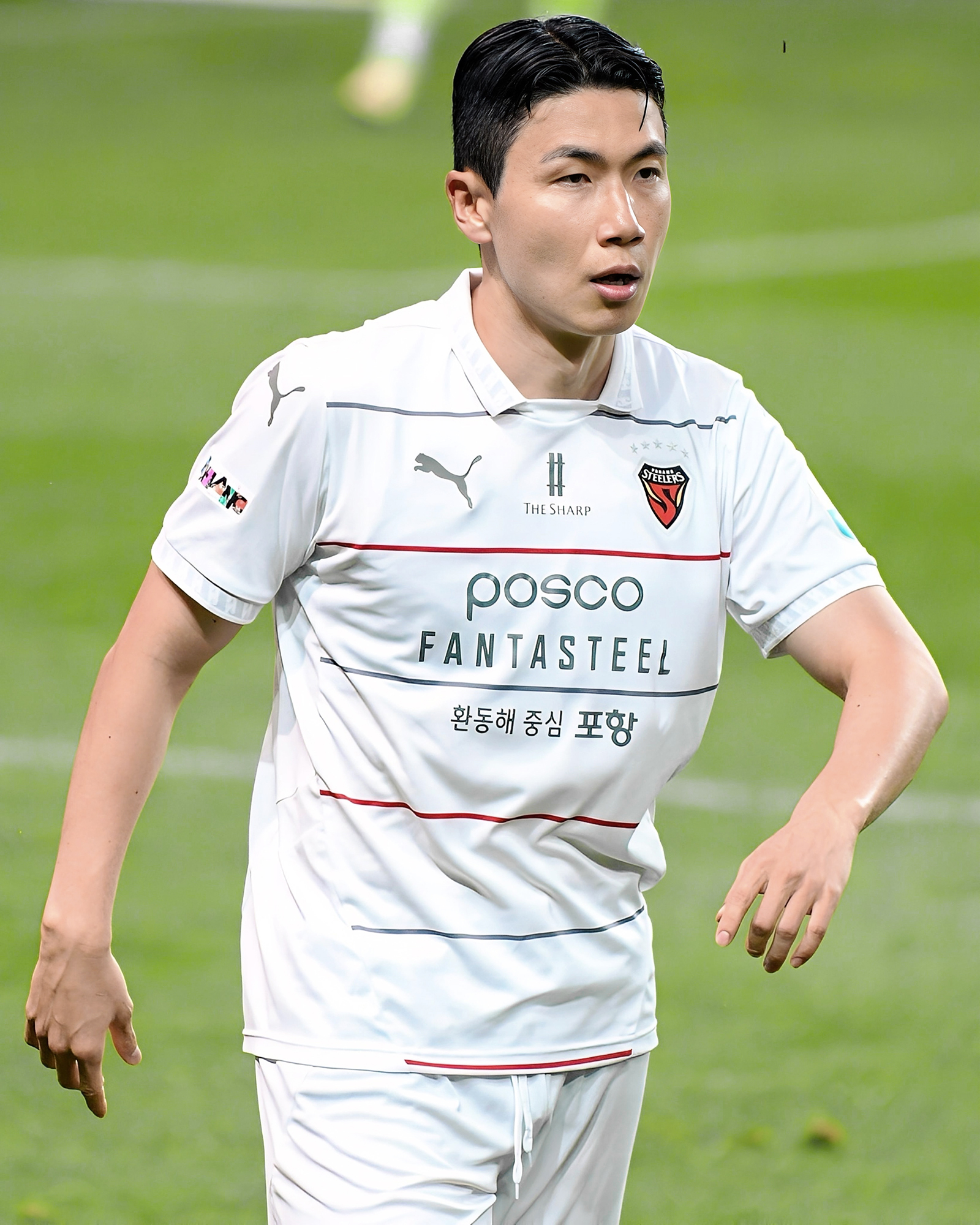
- Kim in 2025

Personal information
- Date of birth: 9 September 1989 (age 37)
- Place of birth: Ansan, Gyoenggi, South Korea
- Height: 1.80 m (5 ft 11 in)
- Position: Winger

Team information
- Current team: Ansan Greeners
- Number: 92

Youth career
- 2008–2010: Sungkyunkwan University

Senior career*
Years	Team	Apps	(Gls)
2011	Gangneung City	24	(4)
2012	CSKA Moscow	1	(0)
2013	Seongnam Ilhwa Chunma	31	(2)
2014	Jeonbuk Hyundai Motors	11	(0)
2015	Incheon United	32	(5)
2016–2021	Ulsan Hyundai	157	(26)
2021–2022	Seoul E-Land	49	(11)
2023–2026	Pohang Steelers	97	(6)
2026–	Ansan Greeners	4	(2)

International career^{‡}
2018–	South Korea	3	(0)
Medal record
Ulsan Hyundai
Winner	AFC Champions League	2020
- * Club domestic league appearances and goals as of 6 August 2026 ‡ National team caps and goals as of 25 March 2021

Kim In-sung (Korean: 김인성; Hanja: 金寅成; born 9 September 1989) is a South Korean footballer who currently plays for Ansan Greeners.

He graduated from Sungkyunkwan University and formerly played for Russian Premier League side PFC CSKA Moscow.

== Career statistics ==
As of 18 September 2025

Club performance			League		Cup		Continental		Other		Total	
Season	Club	League	Apps	Goals	Apps	Goals	Apps	Goals	Apps	Goals	Apps	Goals
2011	Gangneung City	Korea National League	24	4	1	0	—		—		25	4
2011–12	CSKA Moscow	Russian Premier League	1	0	—		0	0	—		1	0
2012–13	CSKA Moscow	Russian Premier League	0	0	1	0	0	0	—		1	0
2013	Seongnam Ilhwa Chunma	K League Classic	31	2	2	0	—		—		33	2
2014	Jeonbuk Hyundai Motors	K League Classic	11	0	3	0	2 (Note: Appearances in AFC Champions League Elite)	0	—		16	0
2015	Incheon United	K League Classic	32	5	4	0	—		—		36	5
2016	Ulsan Hyundai	K League Classic	16	1	3	0	—		—		19	1
2017	Ulsan Hyundai	K League Classic	36	5	5	2	6	2	—		47	9
2018	Ulsan Hyundai	K League 1	32	3	6	1	8	2	—		46	6
2019	Ulsan Hyundai	K League 1	34	9	1	0	8	0	—		43	9
2020	Ulsan Hyundai	K League 1	24	4	4	1	10	2	—		38	7
2021	Ulsan Hyundai	K League 1	15	4	1	1	3	0	2 (Note: Appearances in 2020 FIFA Club World Cup)	0	21	5
2021	Seoul E-Land	K League 2	15	6	0	0	—		—		15	6
2022	Seoul E-Land	K League 2	34	5	0	0	—		—		34	5
2023	Pohang Steelers	K League 1	35	1	4	1	6	3	—		45	5
2024	Pohang Steelers	K League 1	28	2	4	1	6	1	—		38	4
2025	Pohang Steelers	K League 1	26	3	1	0	2 (Note: One appearance in AFC Champions League Elite, one appearance in AFC Champions League Two)	0	—		29	3
Career total			394	54	40	7	51	10	2	0	487	71

== Honours ==
CSKA Moscow

- Russian Cup: 2012–13

Jeonbuk Hyundai Motors

- K League 1: 2014

Ulsan Hyundai

- Korean FA Cup: 2017
- AFC Champions League: 2020

Pohang Steelers

- Korean FA Cup: 2023, 2024

South Korea

- EAFF E-1 Football Championship: 2019

Individual

- Korean FA Cup Most Valuable Player: 2024
