= Jung Hoon-sung =

South Korean footballer (born 1994)

Personal information
- Date of birth: 22 February 1994 (age 32)
- Place of birth: South Korea
- Height: 1.69 m (5 ft 6 1/2 in)
- Position: Midfielder

Senior career*
Years	Team	Apps	(Gls)
2013–2015	V-Varen Nagasaki	13	(0)
2015	→ Grulla Morioka (loan)	14	(1)
2015–2017	Mokpo City		
2018	Gangneung City	24	(6)
2019	Incheon United	16	(1)
2020	Ulsan Hyundai	5	(1)
2021–2022	Busan IPark	11	(1)
2021	→ Jeju United (loan)	1	(0)
2023	Gyeongju KHNP	6	(0)
- * Club domestic league appearances and goals as of 1 January 2024

Jung Hoon-sung (Korean: 정훈성; born February 22, 1994) is a South Korean football player who plays as a winger.

== Playing career ==
Jung Hoon-sung played for V-Varen Nagasaki and Grulla Morioka from 2013 to 2015.
