= Lee Sang-heon (footballer, born 1998) =

South Korean footballer

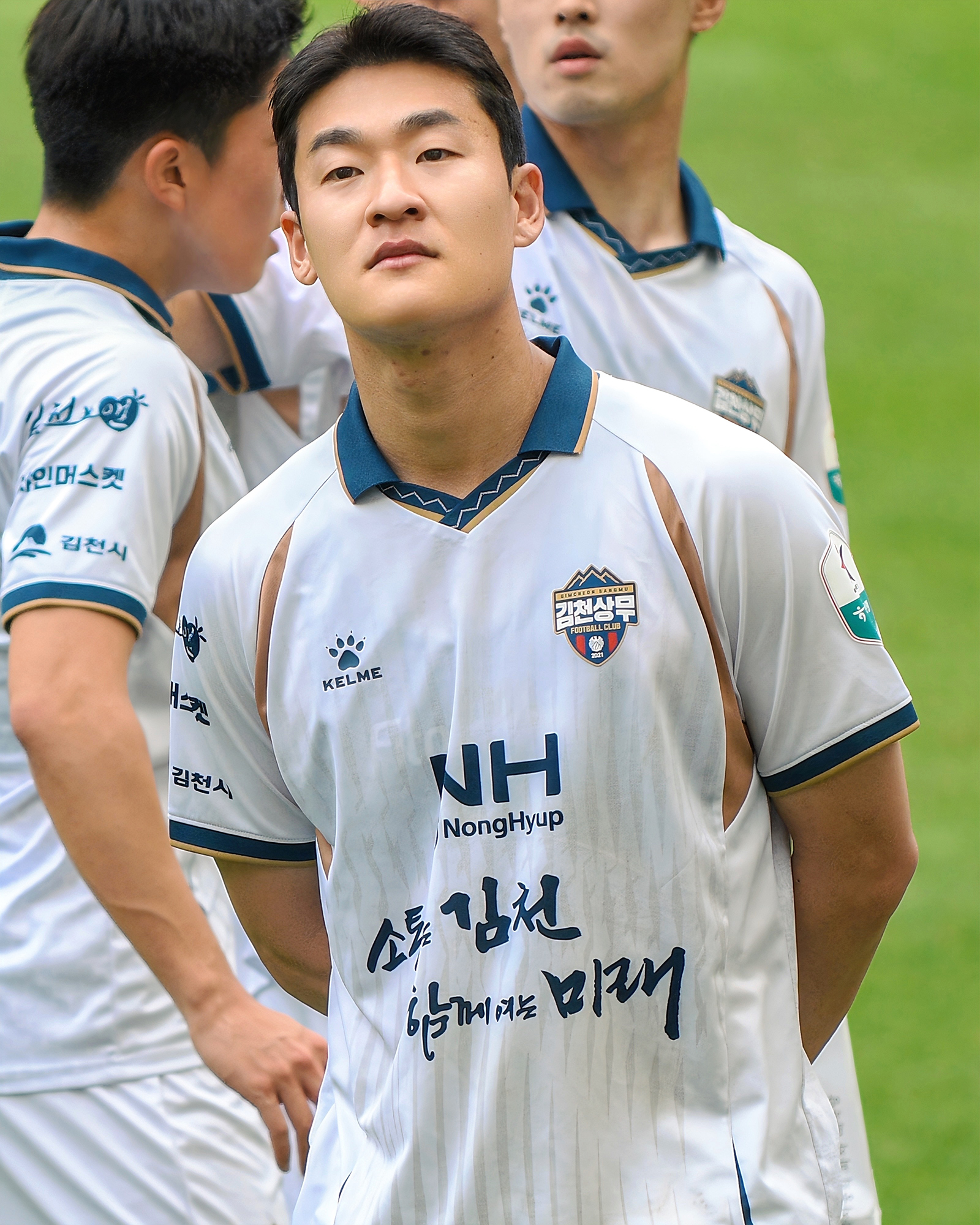
- Lee in 2026

Personal information
- Full name: Lee Sang-heon
- Date of birth: 26 February 1998 (age 28)
- Place of birth: North Gyeongsang Province, South Korea
- Height: 1.80 m (5 ft 11 in)
- Position: Midfielder

Team information
- Current team: Gimcheon Sangmu FC
- Number: 47

Youth career
- 2014–2016: Hyundai High School

Senior career*
| Years | Team | Apps | (Gls) |
| 2017–2020 | Ulsan Hyundai | 15 | (1) |
| 2018 | → Jeonnam Dragons (loan) | 21 | (5) |
| 2021–2023 | Busan IPark | 69 | (10) |
| 2023 | → Busan IPark Futures | 7 | (3) |
| 2024– | Gangwon FC | 67 | (17) |
| 2026– | Gimcheon Sangmu FC (draft) | 11 | (0) |

International career^{‡}
| 2013–2015 | South Korea U17 | 28 | (3) |
| 2016–2017 | South Korea U20 | 15 | (1) |
| 2017 | South Korea U23 | 3 | (1) |
Korean name
| Hangul | 이상헌 |
| RR | I Sangheon |
| MR | I Sanghŏn |
- * Club domestic league appearances and goals as of 1 January 2026 ‡ National team caps and goals as of 3 May 2018

Lee Sang-heon (born 26 February 1998) is a South Korean football midfielder who plays for Gimcheon Sangmu FC in the K League 1.

== Club Career statistics ==
As of 20 August 2025

Appearances and goals by club, season and competition
| Club | Season | League | | | National cup | | Continental | | Total | |
| Club | Season | Division | Apps | Goals | Apps | Goals | Apps | Goals | Apps | Goals |
|---|---|---|---|---|---|---|---|---|---|---|
| Ulsan Hyundai | 2017 | K League 1 | 0 | 0 | 0 | 0 | 0 | 0 | 0 | 0 |
| Ulsan Hyundai | 2018 | K League 1 | 2 | 0 | 0 | 0 | 1 (Note: Appearances in AFC Champions League) | 0 | 3 | 0 |
| Ulsan Hyundai | 2019 | K League 1 | 5 | 1 | 0 | 0 | 0 | 0 | 5 | 1 |
| Ulsan Hyundai | 2020 | K League 1 | 8 | 1 | 0 | 0 | 7 | 1 | 15 | 2 |
| Ulsan Hyundai | Total | | 15 | 2 | 0 | 0 | 8 | 1 | 23 | 3 |
| Jeonnam Dragons (loan) | 2018 | K League 1 | 21 | 5 | 3 | 1 | - | | 24 | 6 |
| Busan I'Park | 2021 | K League 2 | 33 | 3 | 1 | 0 | - | | 34 | 3 |
| Busan I'Park | 2022 | K League 2 | 31 | 7 | 1 | 0 | - | | 32 | 7 |
| Busan I'Park | 2023 | K League 2 | 5 | 0 | 0 | 0 | - | | 5 | 0 |
| Busan I'Park | Total | | 69 | 10 | 2 | 0 | – | | 71 | 10 |
| Busan I'Park Futures | 2023 | K4 League | 7 | 3 | - | | - | | 7 | 3 |
| Gangwon FC | 2024 | K League 1 | 37 | 13 | 0 | 0 | - | | 37 | 13 |
| Gangwon FC | 2025 | K League 1 | 23 | 2 | 2 | 0 | 0 | 0 | 25 | 2 |
| Gangwon FC | Total | | 60 | 15 | 2 | 0 | 0 | 0 | 62 | 15 |
| Career total | | | 172 | 35 | 7 | 1 | 8 | 1 | 187 | 17 |

== Honours ==
Ulsan Hyundai

- AFC Champions League: 2020

Gangwon FC

- K League 1 runner-up: 2024

Individual

- K League 1 Best XI: 2024
