= Kim Tae-hwan (footballer, born 1989) =

South Korean footballer (born 1989)

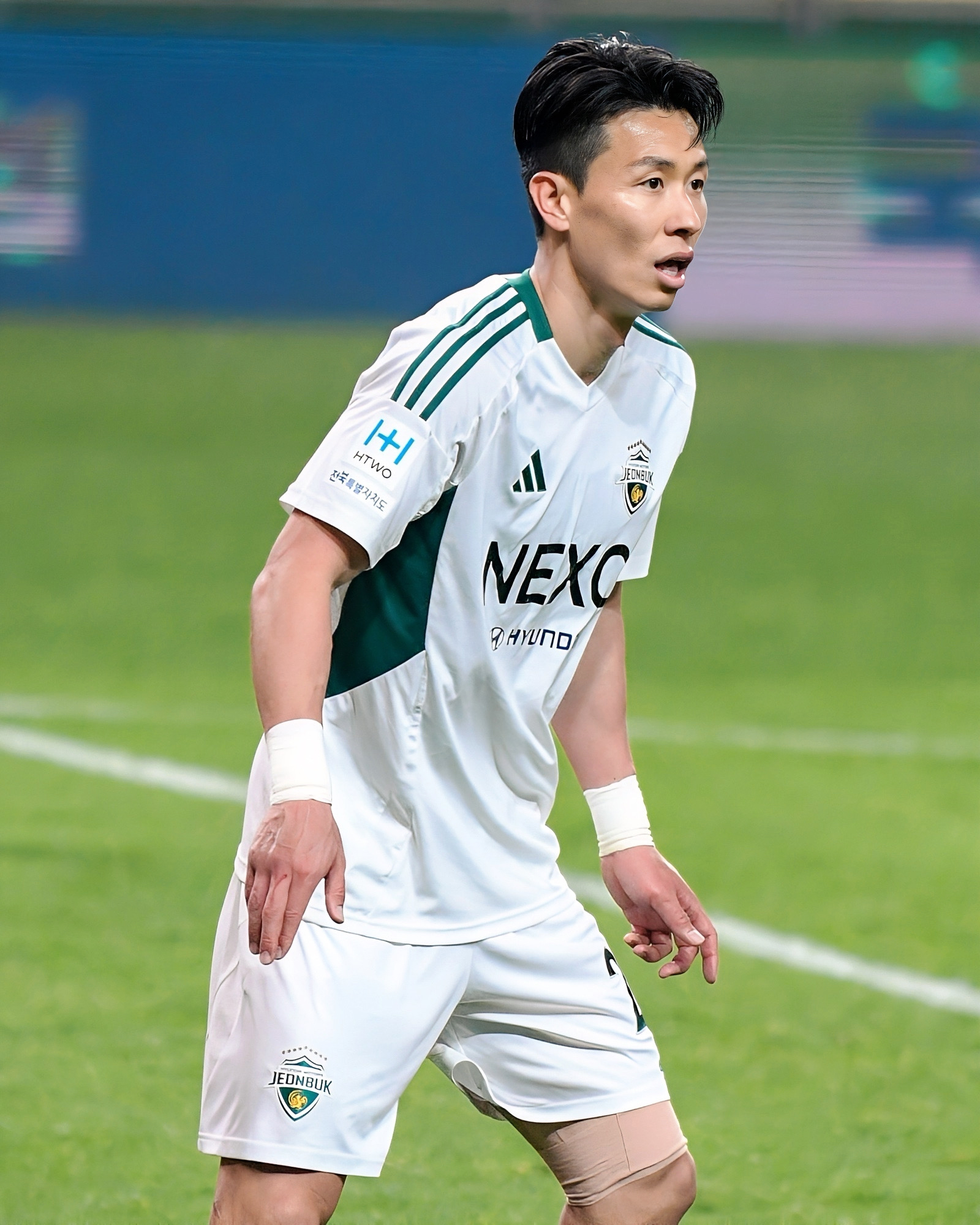
- Kim in 2025

Personal information
- Full name: Kim Tae-hwan
- Date of birth: 24 July 1989 (age 37)
- Place of birth: Gwangju, South Korea
- Height: 1.77 m (5 ft 9 1/2 in)
- Positions: Full-back; winger

Team information
- Current team: Jeonbuk Hyundai Motors
- Number: 23

Youth career
- 2005–2007: Kumho High School
- 2008–2009: University of Ulsan

Senior career*
Years	Team	Apps	(Gls)
2010–2012	FC Seoul	47	(2)
2013–2014	Seongnam FC	70	(8)
2015–2023	Ulsan Hyundai	217	(9)
2017–2018	→ Sangju Sangmu (draft)	55	(2)
2024–	Jeonbuk Hyundai Motors	70	(1)

International career^{‡}
2010	South Korea U20	2	(0)
2011–2012	South Korea U23	11	(2)
2011–	South Korea	31	(0)
Medal record
Ulsan Hyundai
Winner	AFC Champions League	2020
- * Club domestic league appearances and goals as of 3 August 2026 ‡ National team caps and goals as of 6 February 2024

- Kim Tae-hwan
- Hangul: 김태환
- Hanja: 金太煥
- RR: Gim Taehwan
- MR: Kim T'aehwan

Kim Tae-hwan (Korean: 김태환; born 24 July 1989) is a South Korean professional footballer who plays as a right back for the K League 1 club Jeonbuk Hyundai Motors and South Korea national team.

== Club career ==
=== FC Seoul ===
Kim practiced football at University of Ulsan. He was selected by Seoul in 2009 K-League Draft. He made his K-League debut match against Ulsan Hyundai on 18 April 2010. and he scored his league first goal on 23 October 2011 against Seongnam Ilwha. He played 55 games and scored 2 goals at Seoul in 2010–2012.

=== Seongnam Ilwha ===
On 21 December 2012, Kim transferred to Seongnam Ilhwa Chunma for £264,000. He played 74 games and scored 8 goals at Seongnam FC in 2013–14.

=== Ulsan Hyundai ===
On 1 February 2015, Kim transferred to Ulsan Hyundai for unknown fee.

== International career ==
On 15 March 2011, Kim Tae-hwan received his first call up for South Korea national football team.

== Career statistics ==
=== Club ===
As of 3 August 2026

Club performance			League		Cup		Continental		Other		Total	
Season	Club	League	Apps	Goals	Apps	Goals	Apps	Goals	Apps	Goals	Apps	Goals
2010	FC Seoul	K League 1	12	0	1	0	—		7 (Note: Appearances in K League Cup)	0	20	0
2011	FC Seoul	K League 1	16	1	1	0	6 (Note: Appearances in AFC Champions League)	0	1	0	24	1
2012	FC Seoul	K League 1	19	1	2	0	—		—		21	1
2013	Seongnam FC	K League 1	34	3	2	0	—		—		36	3
2014	Seongnam FC	K League 1	36	5	3	0	—		—		39	5
2015	Ulsan Hyundai	K League 1	33	1	4	1	—		—		37	2
2016	Ulsan Hyundai	K League 1	36	4	3	1	—		—		39	5
2017	Sangju Sangmu (draft)	K League 1	34	2	1	0	—		1 (Note: Appearances in K League Promotion-Relegation Playoffs)	0	36	2
2018	Sangju Sangmu (draft)	K League 1	21	0	0	0	—		—		21	0
2018	Ulsan Hyundai	K League 1	8	0	3	0	—		—		11	0
2019	Ulsan Hyundai	K League 1	30	2	1	0	7	0	—		38	2
2020	Ulsan Hyundai	K League 1	25	1	4	0	6	0	—		35	1
2021	Ulsan Hyundai	K League 1	34	0	0	0	9	0	2 (Note: Appearances in FIFA Club World Cup)	0	45	0
2022	Ulsan Hyundai	K League 1	30	0	1	0	3	0	—		34	0
2023	Ulsan Hyundai	K League 1	21	1	1	0	5	0	—		27	1
2024	Jeonbuk Hyundai Motors	K League 1	19	1	0	0	6 (Note: Four appearances in AFC Champions League, two appearances in AFC Champions League Two)	0	2	0	27	1
2025	Jeonbuk Hyundai Motors	K League 1	35	0	4	0	2 (Note: Appearances in AFC Champions League Two)	0	—		41	0
2026	Jeonbuk Hyundai Motors	K League 1	16	0	0	0	0	0	1 (Note: Appearance in K League Super Cup)	0	17	0
Country	South Korea		459	22	31	2	44	0	14	0	548	24
Career total			459	22	31	2	44	0	14	0	548	24

=== International ===
As of 6 February 2024.

Korea Republic national team
Year	Apps	Goals
2014	3	0
2018	2	0
2019	3	0
2020	2	0
2021	2	0
2022	7	0
2023	5	0
2024	7	0
Total	31	0

== Honours ==
=== Club ===
FC Seoul

- K League 1 (2): 2010, 2012
- K-League Cup (1): 2010

Seongnam FC

- FA Cup (1): 2014

Ulsan Hyundai

- AFC Champions League (1): 2020
- K League 1 (2): 2022, 2023

Jeonbuk Hyundai Motors

- K League 1 (1): 2025
- Korean FA Cup (1): 2025
- K League Super Cup (1): 2026

=== International ===
South Korea

- EAFF E-1 Football Championship (1): 2019

=== Individual ===
- K League 1 Best XI (3): 2019, 2020, 2022
