= 2021 AFC Champions League final =

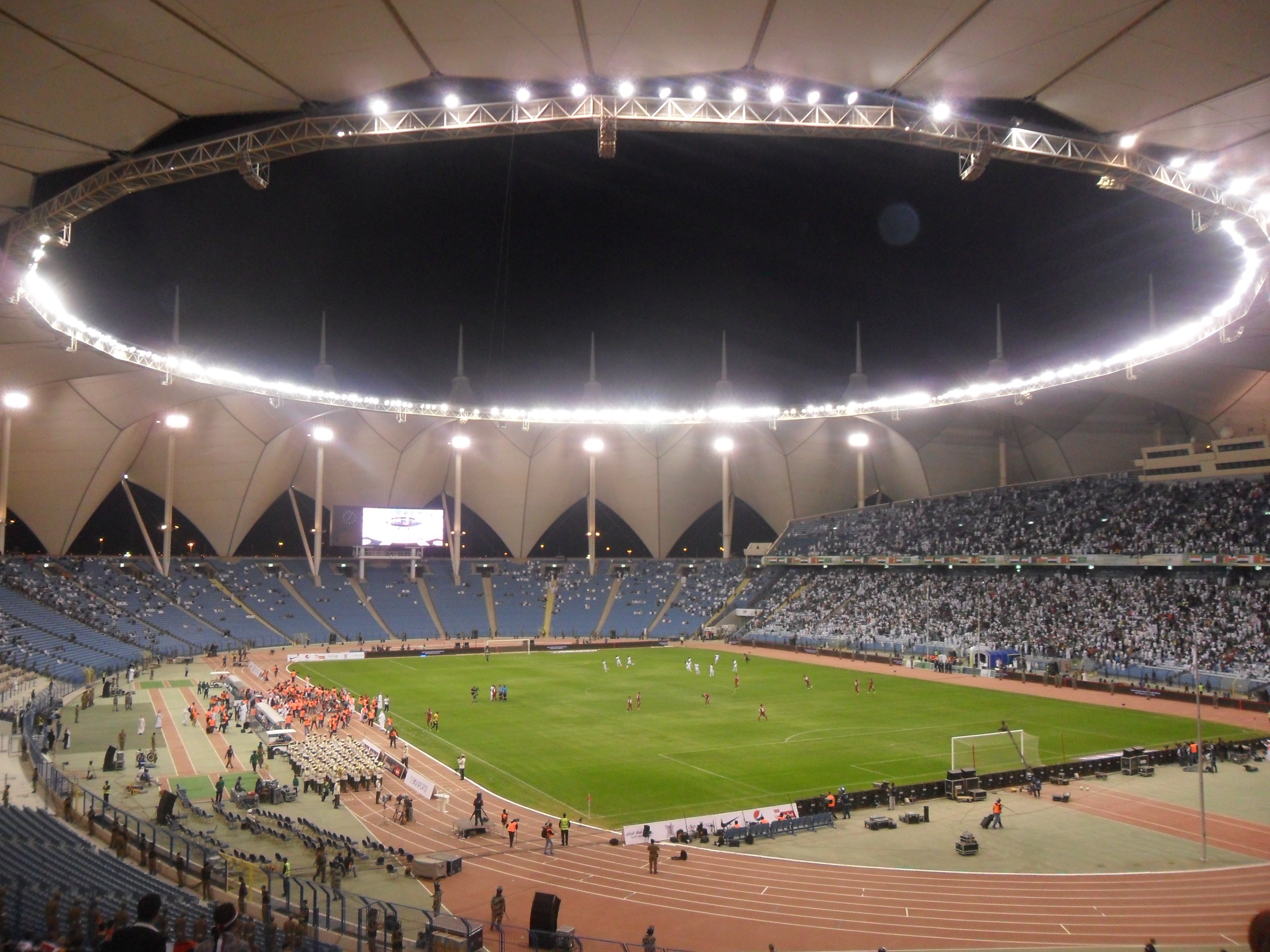
- The King Fahd International Stadium in Riyadh hosted the final
- Event: 2021 AFC Champions League
Al-Hilal	Pohang Steelers
2	0
- Date: 23 November 2021
- Venue: King Fahd International Stadium, Riyadh
- Man of the Match: Moussa Marega (Al-Hilal)
- Referee: Mohammed Abdulla Hassan Mohamed (United Arab Emirates)
- Attendance: 50,171
- Weather: Clear; 25 °C (77 °F); 47% humidity

The 2021 AFC Champions League final was the final of the 2021 AFC Champions League, the 40th edition of the top-level Asian club football tournament organized by the Asian Football Confederation (AFC), and the 19th under the AFC Champions League title.

The final was contested as a single match between Al-Hilal from Saudi Arabia and Pohang Steelers from South Korea. Prior to the match, both teams were joint most successful teams in the AFC Champions League, with three titles each. Al-Hilal won the match 2–0 and clinched their fourth title, becoming the outright most successful team in the history of the competition. As Asian champions, they also qualified for the 2021 FIFA Club World Cup in the United Arab Emirates.

== Teams ==
In the following table, the finals until 2002 were in the Asian Club Championship era, and since 2003 in the AFC Champions League era.

Team	Region	Previous finals appearances (bold indicates winners)
(Saudi Arabia) Al-Hilal	West Region (Zone: WAFF)	7 (1986, 1987, **1991**, **2000**, 2014, 2017, **2019**)
(South Korea) Pohang Steelers	East Region (Zone: EAFF)	3 (**1997**, **1998**, **2009**)

Notes

1. The 1986 final was played in a four-team round-robin format, with Al-Hilal finishing as runners-up.
2. Al-Hilal were unable to participate in the 1987 final and were declared runners-up.

== Venue ==
On 20 October 2021, the AFC announced that Mrsool Park would host the final. It was later changed to King Fahd International Stadium, also in Riyadh.

== Road to the final ==
Note: In all results below, the score of the finalist is given first (H: home; A: away; *: played in centralized group locations).

(Saudi Arabia) Al-Hilal		Round	(South Korea) Pohang Steelers	
Opponent	Result	Group stage	Opponent	Result
(Uzbekistan) AGMK	2–2*	Matchday 1	(Thailand) Ratchaburi Mitr Phol	2–0*
(United Arab Emirates) Shabab Al-Ahli	2–0*	Matchday 2	(Japan) Nagoya Grampus	0–3*
(Tajikistan) Istiklol	3–1*	Matchday 3	(Malaysia) Johor Darul Ta'zim	4–1*
(Tajikistan) Istiklol	1–4*	Matchday 4	(Malaysia) Johor Darul Ta'zim	2–0*
(Uzbekistan) AGMK	3–0*	Matchday 5	(Thailand) Ratchaburi Mitr Phol	0–0*
(United Arab Emirates) Shabab Al-Ahli	0–2*	Matchday 6	(Japan) Nagoya Grampus	1–1*
**Group A runners-up**: Pos / Team / Pld / Pts; 1 / (Tajikistan) Istiklol / 6 / **10**; **2** / (Saudi Arabia) Al-Hilal (H) / **6** / **10**; 3 / (United Arab Emirates) Shabab Al-Ahli / 6 / **7**; 4 / (Uzbekistan) AGMK / 6 / **7**; Source: AFC (H) Hosts		Final standings	**Group G runners-up**: Pos / Team / Pld / Pts; 1 / (Japan) Nagoya Grampus / 6 / **16**; **2** / (South Korea) Pohang Steelers / **6** / **11**; 3 / (Malaysia) Johor Darul Ta'zim / 6 / **4**; 4 / (Thailand) Ratchaburi Mitr Phol (H) / 6 / **2**; Source: AFC (H) Hosts	
Opponent	Result	Knockout stage	Opponent	Result
(Iran) Esteghlal	2–0 (A)	Round of 16	(Japan) Cerezo Osaka	1–0 (A)
(Iran) Persepolis	3–0 (H)	Quarter-finals	(Japan) Nagoya Grampus	3–0 (H)
(Saudi Arabia) Al-Nassr	2–1 (A)	Semi-finals	(South Korea) Ulsan Hyundai	1–1 (a.e.t.) (5–4 p) (A)

== Format ==
The final was played as a single match. If tied after regulation time, extra time and, if necessary, a penalty shoot-out would have been used to decide the winning team.

== Match ==
23 November 2021
19:00 UTC+3

Al-Hilal (Saudi Arabia)	2–0	(South Korea) Pohang Steelers
N. Al-Dawsari 1'; Marega 63'	Live Report; Stats Report

King Fahd International Stadium, Riyadh
Attendance: 50,171
Referee: Mohammed Abdulla Hassan Mohamed (United Arab Emirates)

**Al-Hilal**	**Pohang Steelers**

GK	1	(Saudi Arabia) Abdullah Al-Mayouf
RB	2	(Saudi Arabia) Mohammed Al-Breik
CB	20	(South Korea) Jang Hyun-soo
CB	32	(Saudi Arabia) Muteb Al-Mufarrij
LB	16	(Saudi Arabia) Nasser Al-Dawsari
CM	7	(Saudi Arabia) Salman Al-Faraj (c)
CM	28	(Saudi Arabia) Mohamed Kanno	(yellow card) 83'	(substituted off) 90+4'
RW	17	(Mali) Moussa Marega	(yellow card) 26'
AM	15	(Brazil) Matheus Pereira	(yellow card) 84'
LW	29	(Saudi Arabia) Salem Al-Dawsari
CF	18	(France) Bafétimbi Gomis		(substituted off) 85'
Substitutes:
GK	31	(Saudi Arabia) Habib Al-Wotayan
GK	33	(Saudi Arabia) Abdullah Al-Jadaani
DF	12	(Saudi Arabia) Yasser Al-Shahrani		(substituted on) 85'
DF	23	(Saudi Arabia) Madallah Al-Olayan
DF	70	(Saudi Arabia) Mohammed Jahfali		(substituted on) 90+4'
MF	43	(Saudi Arabia) Musab Al-Juwayr
MF	56	(Saudi Arabia) Mohammed Al-Qahtani
MF	88	(Saudi Arabia) Hamad Al-Yami
FW	11	(Saudi Arabia) Saleh Al-Shehri
FW	14	(Saudi Arabia) Abdullah Al-Hamdan
Manager:
(Portugal) Leonardo Jardim

GK	21	(South Korea) Lee Jun
RB	32	(South Korea) Park Seung-wook
CB	13	(South Korea) Gwon Wan-gyu	(yellow card) 42'
CB	2	(Australia) Alex Grant	(yellow card) 20'
LB	10	(South Korea) Kang Sang-woo (c)
CM	17	(South Korea) Shin Kwang-hoon
CM	57	(South Korea) Lee Soo-bin		(substituted off) 46'
RW	8	(Bosnia and Herzegovina) Mario Kvesić		(substituted off) 46'
AM	6	(South Korea) Sin Jin-ho
LW	77	(South Korea) Lim Sang-hyub	(yellow card) 67'
CF	82	(Colombia) Manuel Palacios
Substitutes:
GK	41	(South Korea) Cho Sung-hoon
DF	3	(South Korea) Lee Kwang-jun
DF	4	(South Korea) Jeon Min-gwang	(yellow card) 53'	(substituted on) 46'
DF	30	(South Korea) Kim Ryun-seong
MF	14	(South Korea) Oh Beom-seok
MF	37	(South Korea) Kim Ho-nam
MF	38	(South Korea) Kim Jin-hyun
MF	79	(South Korea) Go Young-joon		(substituted on) 46'	(substituted off) 81'
FW	20	(South Korea) Lee Ho-jae		(substituted on) 81'
FW	25	(South Korea) Kim Seong-ju
Manager:
(South Korea) Kim Gi-dong

Man of the Match:
Moussa Marega (Al-Hilal)

Assistant referees:
Mohamed Al-Hammadi (United Arab Emirates)
Hasan Al-Mahri (United Arab Emirates)
Fourth official:
Adel Al-Naqbi (United Arab Emirates)
Video assistant referee:
Ammar Al-Jeneibi (United Arab Emirates)
Assistant video assistant referees:
Omar Mohamed Al-Ali (United Arab Emirates)
Hanna Hattab (Syria)

**Match rules**

- 90 minutes.
- 30 minutes of extra time if tied.
- Penalty shoot-out if still tied after extra time.
- Ten named substitutes, of which up to five may be used, with a sixth allowed in extra time. (Note: Each team was only given three opportunities to make substitutions, with a fourth opportunity in extra time, excluding substitutions made at half-time, before the start of extra time and at half-time in extra time.)
