= Oh Se-hoon (disambiguation) =

Oh Se-hoon (Korean: 오세훈) is a Korean name. Notable people with the name include:

- Oh Se-hoon (born 1961), South Korean politician and three-term mayor of Seoul
- Oh Se-hun (born 1994), member of South Korean boy band Exo
- Oh Se-hun (footballer) (born 1999), South Korean football player
