= 2021 AFC Champions League group stage =

Football tournament group stage

The 2021 AFC Champions League group stage was played from 14 to 30 April 2021 for the West Region and from 22 June to 11 July 2021 for the East Region. A total of 40 teams competed in the group stage to decide the 16 places in the knockout stage of the 2021 AFC Champions League.

== Draw ==
The draw for the group stage was held at the AFC House in Kuala Lumpur, Malaysia, on 27 January 2021. The 40 teams were drawn into ten groups of four: five groups each in the West Region (Groups A–E) and the East Region (Groups F–J). For each zone, teams were seeded into four pots and drawn into the relevant positions within each group, based on their association ranking and their seeding within their association, in consideration of technical balance between groups. Teams from the same association could not be drawn into the same group.

The following 40 teams entered into the group stage draw, which included the 32 direct entrants and the eight winners of the play-off round of the qualifying play-offs, whose identity was not known at the time of the draw.

Region	Groups	Pot 1	Pot 2	Pot 3	Pot 4
West Region	A–E	(Qatar) Al-Duhail	(Saudi Arabia) Al-Nassr	(Uzbekistan) Pakhtakor	(Iraq) Al-Shorta (Note: The first-seeded teams of the associations ranked 5th were seeded in the same pot as the play-off winners in consideration of technical balance.)
West Region	A–E	(Saudi Arabia) Al-Hilal	(Iran) Tractor	(Jordan) Al-Wehdat	(Uzbekistan) AGMK (Winners of Play-off West 1)
West Region	A–E	(Iran) Persepolis	(United Arab Emirates) Shabab Al-Ahli	(India) Goa	(Iraq) Al-Quwa Al-Jawiya (Winners of Play-off West 2)
West Region	A–E	(United Arab Emirates) Sharjah	(Qatar) Al-Rayyan	(Tajikistan) Istiklol	(Iran) Foolad (Winners of Play-off West 3)
West Region	A–E	(Qatar) Al-Sadd	(Saudi Arabia) Al-Ahli	(Iran) Esteghlal (Note: The teams which enter the group stage due to slot reallocation are seeded according to the teams they replace.)	(United Arab Emirates) Al-Wahda (Winners of Play-off West 4)
East Region	F–J	(South Korea) Pohang Steelers (~~Jiangsu~~) (Note: Pohang Steelers and Ratchaburi Mitr Phol entered the group stage instead of the qualifying play-offs after Jiangsu ceased operation.)	(Japan) Gamba Osaka	(Philippines) United City	(Thailand) Chiangrai United (~~Sydney FC~~) (Note: Chiangrai United and Daegu FC entered the group stage instead of the qualifying play-offs after Sydney FC withdrew from the competition after the draw.)
East Region	F–J	(Japan) Kawasaki Frontale	(South Korea) Ulsan Hyundai	(Hong Kong) Kitchee	(Philippines) Kaya–Iloilo (Winners of Play-off East 1)
East Region	F–J	(South Korea) Jeonbuk Hyundai Motors	(Thailand) Port	(Vietnam) Viettel	(Japan) Cerezo Osaka
East Region	F–J	(Thailand) BG Pathum United	(China) Beijing Guoan (~~Guangzhou~~) (Note: Shandong Taishan, which were originally entered as China 2, had not satisfied the mandatory Criterion F.04 of the AFC Club Licensing Regulations (Edition 2016) concerning overdue payables. Thus, its license was withdrawn by the Asian Football Confederation’s (AFC) independent Entry Control Body, and Guangzhou were reallocated from China 3 to China 2 (moving from group position I2 to J1), and Beijing Guoan were reallocated from China 4 to China 3 (moving from play-off round to group position I2).)	(Malaysia) Johor Darul Ta'zim	(Thailand) Ratchaburi Mitr Phol
East Region	F–J	(China) Guangzhou (~~Shandong Taishan~~)	(Japan) Nagoya Grampus	(Singapore) Tampines Rovers	(South Korea) Daegu FC

== Format ==
In the group stage, each group was played on a double round-robin basis in centralised venues. The winners of each group and three best runners-up from each region advanced to the round of 16 of the knockout stage.

=== Tiebreakers ===
The teams were ranked according to points (3 points for a win, 1 point for a draw, 0 points for a loss). If tied on points, tiebreakers were applied in the following order (Regulations Article 8.3):

1. Points in head-to-head matches among tied teams;
2. Goal difference in head-to-head matches among tied teams;
3. Goals scored in head-to-head matches among tied teams;
4. ~~Away goals scored in head-to-head matches among tied teams;~~ (not applicable since the matches were played in centralised venue)
5. If more than two teams were tied, and after applying all head-to-head criteria above, a subset of teams were still tied, all head-to-head criteria above were reapplied exclusively to this subset of teams;
6. Goal difference in all group matches;
7. Goals scored in all group matches;
8. Penalty shoot-out if only two teams playing each other in the last round of the group are tied;
9. Disciplinary points (yellow card = 1 point, red card as a result of two yellow cards = 3 points, direct red card = 3 points, yellow card followed by direct red card = 4 points);
10. Association ranking.

== Schedule ==
The schedule of each matchday was as follows.

Matchday	Dates		Matches
Matchday	West Region	East Region	Matches
Matchday 1	14–15 April 2021	22, 24–26 June 2021	Team 1 vs. Team 4, Team 3 vs. Team 2
Matchday 2	17–18 April 2021	25, 27–29 June 2021	Team 4 vs. Team 3, Team 2 vs. Team 1
Matchday 3	20–21 April 2021	28, 30 June – 2 July 2021	Team 4 vs. Team 2, Team 1 vs. Team 3
Matchday 4	23–24 April 2021	1, 3–5 July 2021	Team 2 vs. Team 4, Team 3 vs. Team 1
Matchday 5	26–27 April 2021	4, 6–8 July 2021	Team 4 vs. Team 1, Team 2 vs. Team 3
Matchday 6	29–30 April 2021	7, 9–11 July 2021	Team 1 vs. Team 2, Team 3 vs. Team 4

=== Centralised venues ===
On 11 March 2021, AFC confirmed Thailand as the hosts for the group stage, except for Group H and I. On 10 May 2021, AFC confirmed Uzbekistan as the hosts for Group H and I.

- Groups A and D: Riyadh, Saudi Arabia (Prince Faisal bin Fahd Stadium, King Fahd International Stadium & King Saud University Stadium)
- Group B: Sharjah, United Arab Emirates (Sharjah Stadium)
- Group C: Jeddah, Saudi Arabia (Sports Hall)
- Group E: Margao, India (Fatorda Stadium)
- Groups F and G: Bangkok, Thailand (Rajamangala Stadium & Pathum Thani Stadium)
- Groups H and I: Tashkent, Uzbekistan (Bunyodkor Stadium & Lokomotiv Stadium)
- Groups J: Buriram, Thailand (Buriram Stadium)

== Groups ==
=== Group A ===
Pos	Team	Pld	W	D	L	GF	GA	GD	Pts	Qualification	IST	HIL	SAH	AGK
1	(Tajikistan) Istiklol	6	3	1	2	10	8	+2	10 (Note: Head-to-head goal difference: Istiklol 1, Al Hilal −1.)	Advance to Round of 16	—	4–1	0–0	1–2
2	(Saudi Arabia) Al-Hilal (H)	6	3	1	2	11	9	+2	10	Advance to Round of 16	3–1	—	0–2	2–2
3	(United Arab Emirates) Shabab Al-Ahli	6	2	1	3	6	6	0	7 (Note: Head-to-head goal difference: Shabab Al-Ahli 1, AGMK −1.)		0–1	0–2	—	3–1
4	(Uzbekistan) AGMK	6	2	1	3	9	13	−4	7		2–3	0–3	2–1	—

Source: AFC
Rules for classification: Tiebreakers
(H) Hosts
Notes:
15 April 2021
22:00 UTC+3

Istiklol (Tajikistan)	0–0	(United Arab Emirates) Shabab Al-Ahli
	Live Report; Stats Report

King Fahd International Stadium, Riyadh
Attendance: 0
Referee: Hettikamkanamge Perera (Sri Lanka)
15 April 2021
22:00 UTC+3

Al-Hilal (Saudi Arabia)	2–2	(Uzbekistan) AGMK
Rakhmanov 27' (o.g.); Vietto 36'	Live Report; Stats Report	Polvonov 11'; Shaakhmedov 70'

Prince Faisal bin Fahd Stadium, Riyadh
Attendance: 0
Referee: Ryuji Sato (Japan)

18 April 2021
22:00 UTC+3

Shabab Al-Ahli (United Arab Emirates)	0–2	(Saudi Arabia) Al-Hilal
	Live Report; Stats Report	Gomis 14'; Carrillo 28'

Prince Faisal bin Fahd Stadium, Riyadh
Attendance: 0
Referee: Mohanad Qasim (Iraq)
18 April 2021
22:00 UTC+3

AGMK (Uzbekistan)	2–3	(Tajikistan) Istiklol
Polvonov 57', 90'	Live Report; Stats Report	Đokić 45+1' (o.g.); M. Dzhalilov 55'; Rakhimov 80'

King Fahd International Stadium, Riyadh
Attendance: 0
Referee: Mohd Amirul Izwan Yaacob (Malaysia)

21 April 2021
22:00 UTC+3

Al-Hilal (Saudi Arabia)	3–1	(Tajikistan) Istiklol
Al Bulaihi 39'; Bahebri 52', 64'	Live Report; Stats Report	Hanonov 41'

Prince Faisal bin Fahd Stadium, Riyadh
Attendance: 0
Referee: Masoud Tufayelieh (Syria)
21 April 2021
22:00 UTC+3

AGMK (Uzbekistan)	2–1	(United Arab Emirates) Shabab Al-Ahli
Đokić 87'; Komilov 90+1'	Live Report; Stats Report	Al Attas 28'

King Fahd International Stadium, Riyadh
Attendance: 0
Referee: Ali Abdulnabi (Bahrain)

24 April 2021
22:00 UTC+3

Istiklol (Tajikistan)	4–1	(Saudi Arabia) Al-Hilal
M. Dzhalilov 39', 44'; Safarov 49', 53'	Live Report; Stats Report	Gomis 24'

Prince Faisal bin Fahd Stadium, Riyadh
Attendance: 0
Referee: Omar Al-Yaqoubi (Oman)
24 April 2021
22:00 UTC+3

Shabab Al-Ahli (United Arab Emirates)	3–1	(Uzbekistan) AGMK
Abdullah 3'; Carlos Eduardo 11'; Al Attas 30'	Live Report; Stats Report	Gadoyev 14'

King Fahd International Stadium, Riyadh
Attendance: 0
Referee: Ali Sabah (Iraq)

27 April 2021
22:00 UTC+3

Shabab Al-Ahli (United Arab Emirates)	0–1	(Tajikistan) Istiklol
	Live Report; Stats Report	A. Dzhalilov 90+6'

King Fahd International Stadium, Riyadh
Attendance: 0
Referee: Mohd Amirul Izwan Yaacob (Malaysia)
27 April 2021
22:00 UTC+3

AGMK (Uzbekistan)	0–3	(Saudi Arabia) Al-Hilal
	Live Report; Stats Report	Vietto 39'; Gomis 47'; Al-Shahrani 58'

Prince Faisal bin Fahd Stadium, Riyadh
Attendance: 0
Referee: Hettikamkanamge Perera (Sri Lanka)

30 April 2021
22:00 UTC+3

Istiklol (Tajikistan)	1–2	(Uzbekistan) AGMK
Soirov 87'	Live Report; Stats Report	Polvonov 67'; Đokić 79'

King Fahd International Stadium, Riyadh
Attendance: 0
Referee: Mohanad Qasim (Iraq)
30 April 2021
22:00 UTC+3

Al-Hilal (Saudi Arabia)	0–2	(United Arab Emirates) Shabab Al-Ahli
	Live Report; Stats Report	Jesus 54' (pen.), 90'

Prince Faisal bin Fahd Stadium, Riyadh
Attendance: 0
Referee: Ali Abdulnabi (Bahrain)

=== Group B ===
Pos	Team	Pld	W	D	L	GF	GA	GD	Pts	Qualification	SHA	TRA	PAK	QWJ
1	(United Arab Emirates) Sharjah (H)	6	3	2	1	9	6	+3	11	Advance to Round of 16	—	0–2	4–1	1–0
2	(Iran) Tractor	6	2	4	0	6	3	+3	10	Advance to Round of 16	0–0	—	0–0	1–0
3	(Uzbekistan) Pakhtakor	6	1	4	1	6	8	−2	7		1–1	3–3	—	1–0
4	(Iraq) Al-Quwa Al-Jawiya	6	0	2	4	2	6	−4	2		2–3	0–0	0–0	—

Source: AFC
Rules for classification: Tiebreakers
(H) Hosts
14 April 2021
19:00 UTC+4

Pakhtakor (Uzbekistan)	3–3	(Iran) Tractor
Ćeran 69'; Mukhiddinov 75'; Erkinov 82'	Live Report; Stats Report	Dejagah 53'; Abbaszadeh 56', 85' (pen.)

Sharjah Stadium, Sharjah
Attendance: 0
Referee: Jumpei Iida (Japan)
14 April 2021
22:00 UTC+4

Sharjah (United Arab Emirates)	1–0	(Iraq) Al-Quwa Al-Jawiya
Ba Wazir 62'	Live Report; Stats Report

Sharjah Stadium, Sharjah
Attendance: 0
Referee: Nawaf Shukralla (Bahrain)

17 April 2021
19:00 UTC+4

Al-Quwa Al-Jawiya (Iraq)	0–0	(Uzbekistan) Pakhtakor
	Live Report; Stats Report

Sharjah Stadium, Sharjah
Attendance: 0
Referee: Hussein Abo Yehia (Lebanon)
17 April 2021
22:00 UTC+4

Tractor (Iran)	0–0	(United Arab Emirates) Sharjah
	Live Report; Stats Report

Sharjah Stadium, Sharjah
Attendance: 0
Referee: Ma Ning (China)

20 April 2021
19:00 UTC+4

Al-Quwa Al-Jawiya (Iraq)	0–0	(Iran) Tractor
	Live Report; Stats Report

Sharjah Stadium, Sharjah
Attendance: 0
Referee: Ahmed Al-Kaf (Oman)
20 April 2021
22:00 UTC+4

Sharjah (United Arab Emirates)	4–1	(Uzbekistan) Pakhtakor
Ba Wazir 10'; S. Saleh 26'; Caio 58'; Luanzinho 62'	Live Report; Stats Report	Ćeran 21'

Sharjah Stadium, Sharjah
Attendance: 0
Referee: Jumpei Iida (Japan)

23 April 2021
19:00 UTC+4

Tractor (Iran)	1–0	(Iraq) Al-Quwa Al-Jawiya
Tikdari 2'	Live Report; Stats Report

Sharjah Stadium, Sharjah
Attendance: 0
Referee: Jumpei Iida (Japan)
23 April 2021
22:00 UTC+4

Pakhtakor (Uzbekistan)	1–1	(United Arab Emirates) Sharjah
Derdiyok 59'	Live Report; Stats Report	Khalfan 87'

Sharjah Stadium, Sharjah
Attendance: 0
Referee: Fu Ming (China)

26 April 2021
19:00 UTC+4

Tractor (Iran)	0–0	(Uzbekistan) Pakhtakor
	Live Report; Stats Report

Sharjah Stadium, Sharjah
Attendance: 0
Referee: Hussein Abo Yehia (Lebanon)
26 April 2021
22:00 UTC+4

Al-Quwa Al-Jawiya (Iraq)	2–3	(United Arab Emirates) Sharjah
Collazos 15', 52'	Live Report; Stats Report	Ba Wazir 25'; S. Saleh 35', 60'

Sharjah Stadium, Sharjah
Attendance: 0
Referee: Ahmed Al-Kaf (Oman)

29 April 2021
19:00 UTC+4

Pakhtakor (Uzbekistan)	1–0	(Iraq) Al-Quwa Al-Jawiya
Kholdorkhonov 79'	Live Report; Stats Report

Sharjah Stadium, Sharjah
Attendance: 0
Referee: Nawaf Shukralla (Bahrain)
29 April 2021
22:00 UTC+4

Sharjah (United Arab Emirates)	0–2	(Iran) Tractor
	Live Report; Stats Report	Abbaszadeh 7', 66'

Sharjah Stadium, Sharjah
Attendance: 0
Referee: Jumpei Iida (Japan)

=== Group C ===
Pos	Team	Pld	W	D	L	GF	GA	GD	Pts	Qualification	EST	DUH	AHL	SHO
1	(Iran) Esteghlal	6	3	2	1	14	8	+6	11	Advance to Round of 16	—	2–2	5–2	1–0
2	(Qatar) Al-Duhail	6	2	3	1	11	9	+2	9		4–3	—	1–1	2–0
3	(Saudi Arabia) Al-Ahli (H)	6	2	3	1	9	8	+1	9		0–0	1–1	—	2–1
4	(Iraq) Al-Shorta	6	1	0	5	3	12	−9	3		0–3	2–1	0–3	—

Source: AFC
Rules for classification: Tiebreakers
(H) Hosts
15 April 2021
20:45 UTC+3

Al-Duhail (Qatar)	2–0	(Iraq) Al-Shorta
Olunga 36'; Edmilson 53'	Live Report; Stats Report

Sports Hall, Jeddah
Attendance: 0
Referee: Muhammad Taqi (Singapore)
15 April 2021
23:15 UTC+3

Esteghlal (Iran)	5–2	(Saudi Arabia) Al-Ahli
Esmaeili 5'; Naderi 54'; Ghayedi 67', 86'; Diabaté 89'	Live Report; Stats Report	Al Somah 27', 79'

Sports Hall, Jeddah
Attendance: 0
Referee: Ahmed Al-Ali (Jordan)

18 April 2021
20:45 UTC+3

Al-Ahli (Saudi Arabia)	1–1	(Qatar) Al-Duhail
Al Somah 90+1'	Live Report; Stats Report	Olunga 53'

Sports Hall, Jeddah
Attendance: 0
Referee: Sivakorn Pu-udom (Thailand)
18 April 2021
23:15 UTC+3

Al-Shorta (Iraq)	0–3	(Iran) Esteghlal
	Live Report; Stats Report	Naderi 44'; Esmaeili 55'; Diabaté 65'

Sports Hall, Jeddah
Attendance: 50
Referee: Nivon Robesh Gamini (Sri Lanka)

21 April 2021
20:45 UTC+3

Al-Duhail (Qatar)	4–3	(Iran) Esteghlal
Olunga 10', 27', 85'; Al-Ahrak 43'	Live Report; Stats Report	Motahari 4'; Diabaté 34'; Esmaeili 74'

Sports Hall, Jeddah
Attendance: 50
Referee: Ahmed Al-Ali (Jordan)
21 April 2021
23:15 UTC+3

Al-Shorta (Iraq)	0–3	(Saudi Arabia) Al-Ahli
	Live Report; Stats Report	Hassoun 22'; Fettouhi 37'; Ghareeb 90+4'

Sports Hall, Jeddah
Attendance: 50
Referee: Muhammad Taqi (Singapore)

24 April 2021
20:45 UTC+3

Al-Ahli (Saudi Arabia)	2–1	(Iraq) Al-Shorta
Al Somah 5'; Ghareeb 79'	Live Report; Stats Report	Youssef 26'

Sports Hall, Jeddah
Attendance: 50
Referee: Sivakorn Pu-udom (Thailand)
24 April 2021
23:15 UTC+3

Esteghlal (Iran)	2–2	(Qatar) Al-Duhail
Diabaté 27' (pen.); Ghayedi 61'	Live Report; Stats Report	Olunga 45+3' (pen.), 59'

Sports Hall, Jeddah
Attendance: 50
Referee: Muhammad Taqi (Singapore)

27 April 2021
20:45 UTC+3

Al-Shorta (Iraq)	2–1	(Qatar) Al-Duhail
Attwan 3'; Dawood 85'	Live Report; Stats Report	Olunga 57'

Sports Hall, Jeddah
Attendance: 50
Referee: Omar Al-Yaqoubi (Oman)
27 April 2021
23:15 UTC+3

Al-Ahli (Saudi Arabia)	0–0	(Iran) Esteghlal
	Live Report; Stats Report

Sports Hall, Jeddah
Attendance: 50
Referee: Ryuji Sato (Japan)

30 April 2021
20:45 UTC+3

Esteghlal (Iran)	1–0	(Iraq) Al-Shorta
Diabaté 14' (pen.)	Live Report; Stats Report

Sports Hall, Jeddah
Attendance: 50
Referee: Sivakorn Pu-udom (Thailand)
30 April 2021
23:15 UTC+3

Al-Duhail (Qatar)	1–1	(Saudi Arabia) Al-Ahli
Olunga 61'	Live Report; Stats Report	Asiri 73'

Sports Hall, Jeddah
Attendance: 50
Referee: Hettikamkanamge Perera (Sri Lanka)

=== Group D ===
Pos	Team	Pld	W	D	L	GF	GA	GD	Pts	Qualification	NAS	SAD	WEH	FOO
1	(Saudi Arabia) Al-Nassr (H)	6	3	2	1	9	5	+4	11	Advance to Round of 16	—	3–1	1–2	2–0
2	(Qatar) Al-Sadd	6	3	1	2	9	7	+2	10		1–2	—	3–1	1–1
3	(Jordan) Al-Wehdat	6	2	1	3	4	7	−3	7		0–0	0–2	—	1–0
4	(Iran) Foolad	6	1	2	3	3	6	−3	5		1–1	0–1	1–0	—

Source: AFC
Rules for classification: Tiebreakers
(H) Hosts
14 April 2021
21:00 UTC+3

Al-Wehdat (Jordan)	0–0	(Saudi Arabia) Al-Nassr
	Live Report; Stats Report

King Saud University Stadium, Riyadh
Attendance: 0
Referee: Omar Al-Yaqoubi (Oman)
14 April 2021
21:00 UTC+3

Al-Sadd (Qatar)	1–1	(Iran) Foolad
Abdurisag 89'	Live Report; Stats Report	Chimba 61'

King Fahd International Stadium, Riyadh
Attendance: 0
Referee: Masoud Tufayelieh (Syria)

17 April 2021
21:00 UTC+3

Al-Nassr (Saudi Arabia)	3–1	(Qatar) Al-Sadd
Hamdallah 37'; Al-Sulayhem 79'; Al-Ghannam 90+4'	Live Report; Stats Report	Cazorla 59'

King Saud University Stadium, Riyadh
Attendance: 0
Referee: Ali Sabah (Iraq)
17 April 2021
21:00 UTC+3

Foolad (Iran)	1–0	(Jordan) Al-Wehdat
Chimba 44' (pen.)	Live Report; Stats Report

King Fahd International Stadium, Riyadh
Attendance: 0
Referee: Ali Shaban (Kuwait)

20 April 2021
21:00 UTC+3

Al-Sadd (Qatar)	3–1	(Jordan) Al-Wehdat
Bounedjah 2'; Khoukhi 9'; Al-Haydos 26'	Live Report; Stats Report	Samir 63' (pen.)

King Fahd International Stadium, Riyadh
Attendance: 0
Referee: Hettikamkanamge Perera (Sri Lanka)
20 April 2021
21:00 UTC+3

Foolad (Iran)	1–1	(Saudi Arabia) Al-Nassr
Al-Amri 52' (o.g.)	Live Report; Stats Report	Petros 69'

King Saud University Stadium, Riyadh
Attendance: 0
Referee: Ryuji Sato (Japan)

23 April 2021
21:00 UTC+3

Al-Wehdat (Jordan)	0–2	(Qatar) Al-Sadd
	Live Report; Stats Report	Cazorla 13' (pen.); Assadalla 89'

Prince Faisal bin Fahd Stadium, Riyadh
Attendance: 0
Referee: Mohd Amirul Izwan Yaacob (Malaysia)
23 April 2021
21:00 UTC+3

Al-Nassr (Saudi Arabia)	2–0	(Iran) Foolad
Asiri 54'; Hamdallah 85'	Live Report; Stats Report

King Saud University Stadium, Riyadh
Attendance: 0
Referee: Mohanad Qasim (Iraq)

26 April 2021
21:00 UTC+3

Al-Nassr (Saudi Arabia)	1–2	(Jordan) Al-Wehdat
Hamdallah 90+5' (pen.)	Live Report; Stats Report	Zreik 44'; N'Diaye 72'

King Saud University Stadium, Riyadh
Attendance: 0
Referee: Ali Abdulnabi (Bahrain)
26 April 2021
21:00 UTC+3

Foolad (Iran)	0–1	(Qatar) Al-Sadd
	Live Report; Stats Report	Nam Tae-hee 64'

Prince Faisal bin Fahd Stadium, Riyadh
Attendance: 0
Referee: Ali Shaban (Kuwait)

29 April 2021
21:00 UTC+3

Al-Wehdat (Jordan)	1–0	(Iran) Foolad
Saad 27'	Live Report; Stats Report

King Fahd International Stadium, Riyadh
Attendance: 0
Referee: Ali Sabah (Iraq)
29 April 2021
21:00 UTC+3

Al-Sadd (Qatar)	1–2	(Saudi Arabia) Al-Nassr
Cazorla 83' (pen.)	Live Report; Stats Report	Hamdallah 33'; Al-Amri 74'

King Saud University Stadium, Riyadh
Attendance: 0
Referee: Masoud Tufayelieh (Syria)

=== Group E ===
Pos	Team	Pld	W	D	L	GF	GA	GD	Pts	Qualification	PER	WAH	GOA	RAY
1	(Iran) Persepolis	6	5	0	1	14	5	+9	15	Advance to Round of 16	—	1–0	2–1	4–2
2	(United Arab Emirates) Al-Wahda	6	4	1	1	7	3	+4	13	Advance to Round of 16	1–0	—	0–0	3–2
3	(India) Goa (H)	6	0	3	3	2	9	−7	3		0–4	0–2	—	0–0
4	(Qatar) Al-Rayyan	6	0	2	4	6	12	−6	2		1–3	0–1	1–1	—

Source: AFC
Rules for classification: Tiebreakers
(H) Hosts
14 April 2021
20:00 UTC+5:30

Persepolis (Iran)	1–0	(United Arab Emirates) Al-Wahda
Hosseini 40'	Live Report; Stats Report

Fatorda Stadium, Margao
Attendance: 0
Referee: Hiroyuki Kimura (Japan)
14 April 2021
22:30 UTC+5:30

Goa (India)	0–0	(Qatar) Al-Rayyan
	Live Report; Stats Report

Fatorda Stadium, Margao
Attendance: 0
Referee: Nazmi Nasaruddin (Malaysia)

17 April 2021
20:00 UTC+5:30

Al-Wahda (United Arab Emirates)	0–0	(India) Goa
	Live Report; Stats Report

Fatorda Stadium, Margao
Attendance: 0
Referee: Ahmad Al-Ali (Kuwait)
17 April 2021
22:30 UTC+5:30

Al-Rayyan (Qatar)	1–3	(Iran) Persepolis
Al-Hadhrami 19'	Live Report; Stats Report	Kamyabinia 47'; Moghanlou 49', 57'

Fatorda Stadium, Margao
Attendance: 0
Referee: Ilgiz Tantashev (Uzbekistan)

20 April 2021
20:00 UTC+5:30

Al-Wahda (United Arab Emirates)	3–2	(Qatar) Al-Rayyan
Ayedh 66'; Ibrahim 85'; Jumaa 90+5'	Live Report; Stats Report	Khalilzadeh 13'; Hatem 54'

Fatorda Stadium, Margao
Attendance: 0
Referee: Nazmi Nasaruddin (Malaysia)
20 April 2021
22:30 UTC+5:30

Persepolis (Iran)	2–1	(India) Goa
Torabi 18' (pen.); Hosseini 24'	Live Report; Stats Report	Bedia 14'

Fatorda Stadium, Margao
Attendance: 0
Referee: Hanna Hattab (Syria)

23 April 2021
20:00 UTC+5:30

Al-Rayyan (Qatar)	0–1	(United Arab Emirates) Al-Wahda
	Live Report; Stats Report	Kharbin 71'

Fatorda Stadium, Margao
Attendance: 0
Referee: Ahmad Al-Ali (Kuwait)
23 April 2021
22:30 UTC+5:30

Goa (India)	0–4	(Iran) Persepolis
	Live Report; Stats Report	Moghanlou 24'; Torabi 43' (pen.); Alekasir 47'; Kamyabinia 58'

Fatorda Stadium, Margao
Attendance: 0
Referee: Hiroyuki Kimura (Japan)

26 April 2021
20:00 UTC+5:30

Al-Wahda (United Arab Emirates)	1–0	(Iran) Persepolis
Matavž 5'	Live Report; Stats Report

Fatorda Stadium, Margao
Attendance: 0
Referee: Ilgiz Tantashev (Uzbekistan)
26 April 2021
22:30 UTC+5:30

Al-Rayyan (Qatar)	1–1	(India) Goa
Ferydoon 89'	Live Report; Stats Report	Ortiz 3'

Fatorda Stadium, Margao
Attendance: 0
Referee: Hanna Hattab (Syria)

29 April 2021
20:00 UTC+5:30

Persepolis (Iran)	4–2	(Qatar) Al-Rayyan
Moghanlou 27'; Pahlavan 33'; Kanaanizadegan 68'; Alekasir 73'	Live Report; Stats Report	Boli 48', 72'

Fatorda Stadium, Margao
Attendance: 0
Referee: Hiroyuki Kimura (Japan)
29 April 2021
22:30 UTC+5:30

Goa (India)	0–2	(United Arab Emirates) Al-Wahda
	Live Report; Stats Report	Kharbin 61'; Al-Menhali 90'

Fatorda Stadium, Margao
Attendance: 0
Referee: Ammar Mahfoodh (Bahrain)

=== Group F ===
Pos	Team	Pld	W	D	L	GF	GA	GD	Pts	Qualification	ULS	PAT	VIE	KAY
1	(South Korea) Ulsan Hyundai	6	6	0	0	13	1	+12	18	Advance to Round of 16	—	2–0	3–0	2–1
2	(Thailand) BG Pathum United (H)	6	4	0	2	10	6	+4	12	Advance to Round of 16	0–2	—	2–0	4–1
3	(Vietnam) Viettel	6	2	0	4	7	9	−2	6		0–1	1–3	—	1–0
4	(Philippines) Kaya–Iloilo	6	0	0	6	2	16	−14	0		0–3	0–1	0–5	—

Source: AFC
Rules for classification: Tiebreakers
(H) Hosts
26 June 2021
17:00 UTC+7

BG Pathum United (Thailand)	4–1	(Philippines) Kaya–Iloilo
Teerasil 23', 59'; Diogo 35', 51'	Live Report; Stats Report	Angeles 81'

Pathum Thani Stadium, Pathum Thani
Attendance: 0
Referee: Ryuji Sato (Japan)
26 June 2021
21:00 UTC+7

Viettel (Vietnam)	0–1	(South Korea) Ulsan Hyundai
	Live Report; Stats Report	Hinterseer 90+1'

Pathum Thani Stadium, Pathum Thani
Attendance: 0
Referee: Mohanad Qasim (Iraq)

29 June 2021
17:00 UTC+7

Ulsan Hyundai (South Korea)	2–0	(Thailand) BG Pathum United
Kim Min-jun 24'; Hinterseer 45+2'	Live Report; Stats Report

Pathum Thani Stadium, Pathum Thani
Attendance: 0
Referee: Saoud Al-Athbah (Qatar)
29 June 2021
21:00 UTC+7

Kaya–Iloilo (Philippines)	0–5	(Vietnam) Viettel
	Live Report; Stats Report	Nguyễn Hoàng Đức 2'; Caíque 7', 61'; Bùi Tiến Dũng 49'; Vũ Minh Tuấn 65'

Pathum Thani Stadium, Pathum Thani
Attendance: 0
Referee: Ammar Mahfoodh (Bahrain)

2 July 2021
17:00 UTC+7

Kaya–Iloilo (Philippines)	0–3	(South Korea) Ulsan Hyundai
	Live Report; Stats Report	Oh Se-hun 12', 40'; Qazaishvili 48'

Pathum Thani Stadium, Pathum Thani
Attendance: 0
Referee: Hussein Abo Yehia (Lebanon)
2 July 2021
21:00 UTC+7

BG Pathum United (Thailand)	2–0	(Vietnam) Viettel
Thitiphan 13'; Chaowat 84'	Live Report; Stats Report

Pathum Thani Stadium, Pathum Thani
Attendance: 0
Referee: Hanna Hattab (Syria)

5 July 2021
17:00 UTC+7

Ulsan Hyundai (South Korea)	2–1	(Philippines) Kaya–Iloilo
Yoon Bit-garam 27', 51'	Live Report; Stats Report	Bedic 47'

Pathum Thani Stadium, Pathum Thani
Attendance: 0
Referee: Omar Al-Yaqoubi (Oman)
5 July 2021
21:00 UTC+7

Viettel (Vietnam)	1–3	(Thailand) BG Pathum United
Pedro Paulo 23'	Live Report; Stats Report	Chaowat 56'; Túñez 62'; Diogo 64'

Pathum Thani Stadium, Pathum Thani
Attendance: 0
Referee: Ryuji Sato (Japan)

8 July 2021
17:00 UTC+7

Kaya–Iloilo (Philippines)	0–1	(Thailand) BG Pathum United
	Live Report; Stats Report	Sarach 83'

Pathum Thani Stadium, Pathum Thani
Attendance: 0
Referee: Ammar Mahfoodh (Bahrain)
8 July 2021
21:00 UTC+7

Ulsan Hyundai (South Korea)	3–0	(Vietnam) Viettel
Qazaishvili 48'; Hinterseer 55'; Oh Se-hun 86'	Live Report; Stats Report

Pathum Thani Stadium, Pathum Thani
Attendance: 0
Referee: Shaun Evans (Australia)

11 July 2021
17:00 UTC+7

Viettel (Vietnam)	1–0	(Philippines) Kaya–Iloilo
Caíque 57'	Live Report; Stats Report

Pathum Thani Stadium, Pathum Thani
Attendance: 0
Referee: Hanna Hattab (Syria)
11 July 2021
21:00 UTC+7

BG Pathum United (Thailand)	0–2	(South Korea) Ulsan Hyundai
	Live Report; Stats Report	Kim Min-jun 31'; Qazaishvili 87'

Pathum Thani Stadium, Pathum Thani
Attendance: 0
Referee: Alireza Faghani (Iran)

=== Group G ===
Pos	Team	Pld	W	D	L	GF	GA	GD	Pts	Qualification	NAG	POH	JOH	RAT
1	(Japan) Nagoya Grampus	6	5	1	0	14	2	+12	16	Advance to Round of 16	—	3–0	2–1	3–0
2	(South Korea) Pohang Steelers	6	3	2	1	9	5	+4	11	Advance to Round of 16	1–1	—	4–1	2–0
3	(Malaysia) Johor Darul Ta'zim	6	1	1	4	3	9	−6	4		0–1	0–2	—	0–0
4	(Thailand) Ratchaburi Mitr Phol (H)	6	0	2	4	0	10	−10	2		0–4	0–0	0–1	—

Source: AFC
Rules for classification: Tiebreakers
(H) Hosts
22 June 2021
17:00 UTC+7

Pohang Steelers (South Korea)	2–0	(Thailand) Ratchaburi Mitr Phol
Tashchy 11'; Lim Sang-hyub 81'	Live Report; Stats Report

Rajamangala Stadium, Bangkok
Attendance: 0
Referee: Ma Ning (China)
22 June 2021
21:00 UTC+7

Johor Darul Ta'zim (Malaysia)	0–1	(Japan) Nagoya Grampus
	Live Report; Stats Report	Abe 60'

Rajamangala Stadium, Bangkok
Attendance: 0
Referee: Mohammed Abdulla Hassan Mohamed (United Arab Emirates)

25 June 2021
17:00 UTC+7

Nagoya Grampus (Japan)	3–0	(South Korea) Pohang Steelers
Kakitani 34'; Mateus 65' (pen.), 82'	Live Report; Stats Report

Rajamangala Stadium, Bangkok
Attendance: 0
Referee: Turki Al-Khudhayr (Saudi Arabia)
25 June 2021
21:00 UTC+7

Ratchaburi Mitr Phol (Thailand)	0–1	(Malaysia) Johor Darul Ta'zim
	Live Report; Stats Report	Velázquez 47'

Rajamangala Stadium, Bangkok
Attendance: 0
Referee: Alireza Faghani (Iran)

28 June 2021
17:00 UTC+7

Ratchaburi Mitr Phol (Thailand)	0–4	(Japan) Nagoya Grampus
	Live Report; Stats Report	Yamasaki 26', 31', 45+1'; Saitō 69'

Rajamangala Stadium, Bangkok
Attendance: 0
Referee: Omar Al-Yaqoubi (Oman)
28 June 2021
21:00 UTC+7

Pohang Steelers (South Korea)	4–1	(Malaysia) Johor Darul Ta'zim
Tashchy 27' (pen.); Kang Sang-woo 35' (pen.); Kwon Ki-pyo 82'; Lim Sang-hyub 90+1' (pen.)	Live Report; Stats Report	Velázquez 17'

Rajamangala Stadium, Bangkok
Attendance: 0
Referee: Shaun Evans (Australia)

1 July 2021
17:00 UTC+7

Johor Darul Ta'zim (Malaysia)	0–2	(South Korea) Pohang Steelers
	Live Report; Stats Report	Lee Seung-mo 33'; Kang Sang-woo 37'

Rajamangala Stadium, Bangkok
Attendance: 0
Referee: Ma Ning (China)
1 July 2021
21:00 UTC+7

Nagoya Grampus (Japan)	3–0	(Thailand) Ratchaburi Mitr Phol
Mateus 50'; Kakitani 73'; Yamasaki 79'	Live Report; Stats Report

Rajamangala Stadium, Bangkok
Attendance: 0
Referee: Turki Al-Khudhayr (Saudi Arabia)

4 July 2021
17:00 UTC+7

Ratchaburi Mitr Phol (Thailand)	0–0	(South Korea) Pohang Steelers
	Live Report; Stats Report

Rajamangala Stadium, Bangkok
Attendance: 0
Referee: Saoud Al-Athbah (Qatar)
4 July 2021
21:00 UTC+7

Nagoya Grampus (Japan)	2–1	(Malaysia) Johor Darul Ta'zim
Mateus 4' (pen.); Abe 28'	Live Report; Stats Report	Ramadhan 42'

Rajamangala Stadium, Bangkok
Attendance: 0
Referee: Alireza Faghani (Iran)

7 July 2021
17:00 UTC+7

Pohang Steelers (South Korea)	1–1	(Japan) Nagoya Grampus
Tashchy 88'	Live Report; Stats Report	Maeda 51'

Rajamangala Stadium, Bangkok
Attendance: 0
Referee: Mohammed Abdulla Hassan Mohamed (United Arab Emirates)
7 July 2021
21:00 UTC+7

Johor Darul Ta'zim (Malaysia)	0–0	(Thailand) Ratchaburi Mitr Phol
	Live Report; Stats Report

Rajamangala Stadium, Bangkok
Attendance: 0
Referee: Mohanad Qasim (Iraq)

=== Group H ===
Pos	Team	Pld	W	D	L	GF	GA	GD	Pts	Qualification	JEO	GAM	CHI	TAM
1	(South Korea) Jeonbuk Hyundai Motors	6	5	1	0	22	5	+17	16	Advance to Round of 16	—	2–1	2–1	9–0
2	(Japan) Gamba Osaka	6	2	3	1	15	7	+8	9		2–2	—	1–1	8–1
3	(Thailand) Chiangrai United	6	2	2	2	8	7	+1	8		1–3	1–1	—	1–0
4	(Singapore) Tampines Rovers	6	0	0	6	1	27	−26	0		0–4	0–2	0–3	—

Source: AFC
Rules for classification: Tiebreakers
25 June 2021
19:00 UTC+5

Tampines Rovers (Singapore)	0–2	(Japan) Gamba Osaka
	Live Report; Stats Report	Patric 26'; Pereira 88'

Lokomotiv Stadium, Tashkent
Attendance: 0
Referee: Nivon Robesh Gamini (Sri Lanka)
25 June 2021
21:00 UTC+5

Jeonbuk Hyundai Motors (South Korea)	2–1	(Thailand) Chiangrai United
Lee Seung-gi 36'; Gustavo 52' (pen.)	Live Report; Stats Report	Ekanit 68'

Bunyodkor Stadium, Tashkent
Attendance: 0
Referee: Abdulrahman Al-Jassim (Qatar)

28 June 2021
19:00 UTC+5

Chiangrai United (Thailand)	1–0	(Singapore) Tampines Rovers
Sivakorn 87'	Live Report; Stats Report

Bunyodkor Stadium, Tashkent
Attendance: 0
Referee: Omar Mohamed Al-Ali (United Arab Emirates)
28 June 2021
21:00 UTC+5

Gamba Osaka (Japan)	2–2	(South Korea) Jeonbuk Hyundai Motors
Patric 27', 31'	Live Report; Stats Report	Iljutcenko 2'; Kunimoto 17'

Lokomotiv Stadium, Tashkent
Attendance: 0
Referee: Mohammed Al-Hoish (Saudi Arabia)

1 July 2021
19:00 UTC+5

Jeonbuk Hyundai Motors (South Korea)	9–0	(Singapore) Tampines Rovers
Barrow 5', 54', 75'; Gustavo 14', 15', 57' (pen.), 60'; Kim Seung-dae 35'; Iljutcenko 72'	Live Report; Stats Report

Lokomotiv Stadium, Tashkent
Attendance: 0
Referee: Ahmad Yacoub Ibrahim (Jordan)
1 July 2021
21:00 UTC+5

Chiangrai United (Thailand)	1–1	(Japan) Gamba Osaka
Bill 90+4'	Live Report; Stats Report	Pereira 88'

Bunyodkor Stadium, Tashkent
Attendance: 0
Referee: Ahmed Al-Kaf (Oman)

4 July 2021
19:00 UTC+5

Tampines Rovers (Singapore)	0–4	(South Korea) Jeonbuk Hyundai Motors
	Live Report; Stats Report	Iljutcenko 36', 75'; Gustavo 64'; Barrow 73'

Bunyodkor Stadium, Tashkent
Attendance: 0
Referee: Masoud Tufayelieh (Syria)
4 July 2021
21:00 UTC+5

Gamba Osaka (Japan)	1–1	(Thailand) Chiangrai United
Brinner 54' (o.g.)	Live Report; Stats Report	Felipe Amorim 6'

Lokomotiv Stadium, Tashkent
Attendance: 0
Referee: Mohd Amirul Izwan Yaacob (Malaysia)

7 July 2021
19:00 UTC+5

Gamba Osaka (Japan)	8–1	(Singapore) Tampines Rovers
Kurata 21'; Kawasaki 25', 53', 80'; Ichimi 28'; Wellington 75'; Patric 78', 87'	Live Report; Stats Report	Bennett 27'

Bunyodkor Stadium, Tashkent
Attendance: 0
Referee: Yu Ming-hsun (Chinese Taipei)
7 July 2021
21:00 UTC+5

Chiangrai United (Thailand)	1–3	(South Korea) Jeonbuk Hyundai Motors
Bill 68' (pen.)	Live Report; Stats Report	Barrow 9'; Hong Jeong-ho 20'; Park Jin-seong 35'

Lokomotiv Stadium, Tashkent
Attendance: 0
Referee: Mooud Bonyadifar (Iran)

10 July 2021
19:00 UTC+5

Tampines Rovers (Singapore)	0–3	(Thailand) Chiangrai United
	Live Report; Stats Report	Felipe Amorim 75'; Bill 82'; Phitiwat 90'

Lokomotiv Stadium, Tashkent
Attendance: 0
Referee: Mohd Amirul Izwan Yaacob (Malaysia)
10 July 2021
19:00 UTC+5

Jeonbuk Hyundai Motors (South Korea)	2–1	(Japan) Gamba Osaka
Gustavo 6' (pen.); Barrow 88'	Live Report; Stats Report	Patric 53'

Bunyodkor Stadium, Tashkent
Attendance: 0
Referee: Ahmed Al-Kaf (Oman)

=== Group I ===
Pos	Team	Pld	W	D	L	GF	GA	GD	Pts	Qualification	KAW	DAE	UNI	BJG
1	(Japan) Kawasaki Frontale	6	6	0	0	27	3	+24	18	Advance to Round of 16	—	3–2	8–0	4–0
2	(South Korea) Daegu FC	6	4	0	2	22	6	+16	12	Advance to Round of 16	1–3	—	7–0	5–0
3	(Philippines) United City	6	1	1	4	4	24	−20	4		0–2	0–4	—	1–1
4	(China) Beijing Guoan	6	0	1	5	3	23	−20	1		0–7	0–3	2–3	—

Source: AFC
Rules for classification: Tiebreakers
26 June 2021
19:00 UTC+5

United City (Philippines)	1–1	(China) Beijing Guoan
Schröck 28'	Live Report; Stats Report	Liang Shaowen 73'

Bunyodkor Stadium, Tashkent
Attendance: 0
Referee: Mooud Bonyadifar (Iran)
26 June 2021
21:00 UTC+5

Kawasaki Frontale (Japan)	3–2	(South Korea) Daegu FC
Leandro Damião 40', 51'; João Schmidt 55'	Live Report; Stats Report	Hwang Soon-min 8'; Cesinha 47'

Lokomotiv Stadium, Tashkent
Attendance: 0
Referee: Ahmed Al-Kaf (Oman)

29 June 2021
19:00 UTC+5

Daegu FC (South Korea)	7–0	(Philippines) United City
Cesinha 23'; Edgar 42'; Kim Jin-hyuk 45+3'; An Yong-woo 62', 72'; Park Han-bin 90'; Jung Chi-in 90+5' (pen.)	Live Report; Stats Report

Bunyodkor Stadium, Tashkent
Attendance: 0
Referee: Mohd Amirul Izwan Yaacob (Malaysia)
29 June 2021
21:00 UTC+5

Beijing Guoan (China)	0–7	(Japan) Kawasaki Frontale
	Live Report; Stats Report	Hasegawa 7'; Tachibanada 8'; Tono 41'; Chinen 47' (pen.), 59'; Yamamura 51'; Wakizaka 56'

Lokomotiv Stadium, Tashkent
Attendance: 0
Referee: Masoud Tufayelieh (Syria)

2 July 2021
19:00 UTC+5

Kawasaki Frontale (Japan)	8–0	(Philippines) United City
Mitoma 33', 82'; Oshima 42'; Leandro Damião 50'; Tachibanada 56', 65', 70'; Wakizaka 90+2'	Live Report; Stats Report

Lokomotiv Stadium, Tashkent
Attendance: 0
Referee: Hasan Akrami (Iran)
2 July 2021
19:00 UTC+5

Daegu FC (South Korea)	5–0	(China) Beijing Guoan
Edgar 14', 27'; Cesinha 48', 55'; Oh Hu-seong 90+2'	Live Report; Stats Report

Bunyodkor Stadium, Tashkent
Attendance: 0
Referee: Mohammed Al-Hoish (Saudi Arabia)

5 July 2021
19:00 UTC+5

United City (Philippines)	0–2	(Japan) Kawasaki Frontale
	Live Report; Stats Report	Chinen 18'; Hasegawa 78'

Lokomotiv Stadium, Tashkent
Attendance: 0
Referee: Omar Mohamed Al-Ali (United Arab Emirates)
5 July 2021
19:00 UTC+5

Beijing Guoan (China)	0–3	(South Korea) Daegu FC
	Live Report; Stats Report	Kim Jin-hyuk 45'; Jung Chi-in 57'; Liang Shaowen 76' (o.g.)

Bunyodkor Stadium, Tashkent
Attendance: 0
Referee: Nivon Robesh Gamini (Sri Lanka)

8 July 2021
19:00 UTC+5

Beijing Guoan (China)	2–3	(Philippines) United City
Jiang Wenhao 1'; Leng Jixuan 4'	Live Report; Stats Report	Hartmann 59', 80'; Marañón 69'

Lokomotiv Stadium, Tashkent
Referee: Ahmad Yacoub Ibrahim (Jordan)
8 July 2021
21:00 UTC+5

Daegu FC (South Korea)	1–3	(Japan) Kawasaki Frontale
Edgar 43'	Live Report; Stats Report	Leandro Damião 34', 64', 87'

Bunyodkor Stadium, Tashkent
Attendance: 0
Referee: Abdulrahman Al-Jassim (Qatar)

11 July 2021
17:00 UTC+5

United City (Philippines)	0–4	(South Korea) Daegu FC
	Live Report; Stats Report	Nishi 37'; Lee Keun-ho 48'; Edgar 58'; Jung Chi-in 73'

Bunyodkor Stadium, Tashkent
Attendance: 0
Referee: Ilgiz Tantashev (Uzbekistan)
11 July 2021
17:00 UTC+5

Kawasaki Frontale (Japan)	4–0	(China) Beijing Guoan
Chinen 21'; Kozuka 37', 69'; Miyagi 56'	Live Report; Stats Report

Lokomotiv Stadium, Tashkent
Attendance: 0
Referee: Mohammed Al-Hoish (Saudi Arabia)

=== Group J ===
Pos	Team	Pld	W	D	L	GF	GA	GD	Pts	Qualification	CER	KIT	POR	GZH
1	(Japan) Cerezo Osaka	6	4	2	0	13	2	+11	14	Advance to Round of 16	—	2–1	1–1	5–0
2	(Hong Kong) Kitchee	6	3	2	1	6	3	+3	11		0–0	—	2–0	1–0
3	(Thailand) Port (H)	6	2	2	2	10	8	+2	8		0–3	1–1	—	3–0
4	(China) Guangzhou	6	0	0	6	1	17	−16	0		0–2	0–1	1–5	—

Source: AFC
Rules for classification: Tiebreakers
(H) Hosts
24 June 2021
17:00 UTC+7

Guangzhou (China)	0–2	(Japan) Cerezo Osaka
	Live Report; Stats Report	Okuno 15'; Tiago 69'

Buriram Stadium, Buriram
Attendance: 0
Referee: Nawaf Shukralla (Bahrain)
24 June 2021
21:00 UTC+7

Kitchee (Hong Kong)	2–0	(Thailand) Port
Roberto 37'; Damjanović 79'	Live Report; Stats Report

Buriram Stadium, Buriram
Attendance: 0
Referee: Kim Dae-yong (South Korea)

27 June 2021
17:00 UTC+7

Port (Thailand)	3–0	(China) Guangzhou
Dolah 21'; Pakorn 60'; Roller 76'	Live Report; Stats Report

Buriram Stadium, Buriram
Attendance: 0
Referee: Bijan Heidari (Iran)
27 June 2021
21:00 UTC+7

Cerezo Osaka (Japan)	2–1	(Hong Kong) Kitchee
Taggart 69'; Tiago 71'	Live Report; Stats Report	Damjanović 38'

Buriram Stadium, Buriram
Attendance: 0
Referee: Khamis Al-Marri (Qatar)

30 June 2021
17:00 UTC+7

Cerezo Osaka (Japan)	1–1	(Thailand) Port
Sakamoto 79'	Live Report; Stats Report	Pakorn 45+3'

Buriram Stadium, Buriram
Attendance: 0
Referee: Ko Hyung-jin (South Korea)
30 June 2021
21:00 UTC+7

Guangzhou (China)	0–1	(Hong Kong) Kitchee
	Live Report; Stats Report	Damjanović 36' (pen.)

Buriram Stadium, Buriram
Attendance: 0
Referee: Ali Shaban (Kuwait)

3 July 2021
17:00 UTC+7

Port (Thailand)	0–3	(Japan) Cerezo Osaka
	Live Report; Stats Report	Maruhashi 12'; Ōkubo 45'; Sakamoto 47'

Buriram Stadium, Buriram
Attendance: 0
Referee: Nawaf Shukralla (Bahrain)
3 July 2021
21:00 UTC+7

Kitchee (Hong Kong)	1–0	(China) Guangzhou
Damjanović 70' (pen.)	Live Report; Stats Report

Buriram Stadium, Buriram
Attendance: 0
Referee: Khamis Al-Marri (Qatar)

6 July 2021
17:00 UTC+7

Cerezo Osaka (Japan)	5–0	(China) Guangzhou
Kato 33', 90+2'; Matsumoto 53', 72'; Tiago 67'	Live Report; Stats Report

Buriram Stadium, Buriram
Attendance: 0
Referee: Bijan Heidari (Iran)
6 July 2021
21:00 UTC+7

Port (Thailand)	1–1	(Hong Kong) Kitchee
Pakorn 13'	Live Report; Stats Report	Orr 18'

Buriram Stadium, Buriram
Attendance: 0
Referee: Ko Hyung-jin (South Korea)

9 July 2021
17:00 UTC+7

Kitchee (Hong Kong)	0–0	(Japan) Cerezo Osaka
	Live Report; Stats Report

Buriram Stadium, Buriram
Attendance: 0
Referee: Ali Sabah (Iraq)
9 July 2021
21:00 UTC+7

Guangzhou (China)	1–5	(Thailand) Port
Thitawee 49' (o.g.)	Live Report; Stats Report	Suárez 5'; Bordin 53'; Rochela 56'; Wang Wenxuan 76' (o.g.); Chappuis 90+3'

Buriram Stadium, Buriram
Attendance: 0
Referee: Kim Dae-yong (South Korea)

== Ranking of second-placed teams ==
=== West Region ===
Pos	Grp	Team	Pld	W	D	L	GF	GA	GD	Pts	Qualification
1	E	(United Arab Emirates) Al-Wahda	6	4	1	1	7	3	+4	13	Advance to Round of 16
2	B	(Iran) Tractor	6	2	4	0	6	3	+3	10	Advance to Round of 16
3	A	(Saudi Arabia) Al-Hilal	6	3	1	2	11	9	+2	10	Advance to Round of 16
4	D	(Qatar) Al-Sadd	6	3	1	2	9	7	+2	10	
5	C	(Qatar) Al-Duhail	6	2	3	1	11	9	+2	9	

Source: AFC
Rules for classification: 1) Points; 2) Goal difference; 3) Goals scored; 4) Disciplinary points; 5) Drawing of lots.

=== East Region ===
Pos	Grp	Team	Pld	W	D	L	GF	GA	GD	Pts	Qualification
1	I	(South Korea) Daegu FC	6	4	0	2	22	6	+16	12	Advance to Round of 16
2	F	(Thailand) BG Pathum United	6	4	0	2	10	6	+4	12	Advance to Round of 16
3	G	(South Korea) Pohang Steelers	6	3	2	1	9	5	+4	11	Advance to Round of 16
4	J	(Hong Kong) Kitchee	6	3	2	1	6	3	+3	11	
5	H	(Japan) Gamba Osaka	6	2	3	1	15	7	+8	9	

Source: AFC
Rules for classification: 1) Points; 2) Goal difference; 3) Goals scored; 4) Disciplinary points; 5) Drawing of lots.
