= Oh Se-hun (footballer) =

South Korean footballer (born 1999)

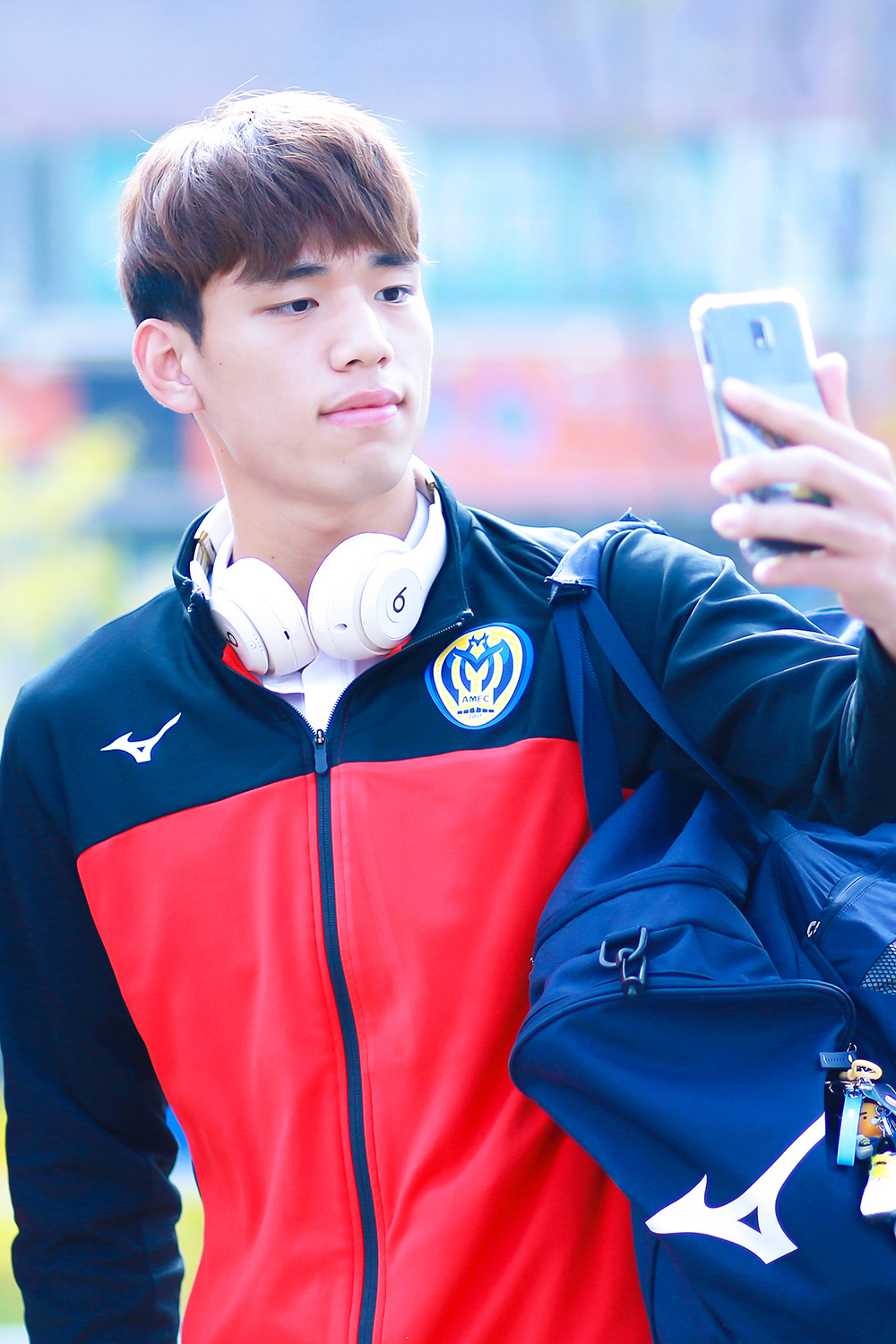
- Oh in November 2019

Personal information
- Date of birth: 15 January 1999 (age 27)
- Place of birth: Incheon, South Korea
- Height: 1.93 m (6 ft 4 in)
- Position: Centre-forward

Team information
- Current team: Shimizu S-Pulse
- Number: 9

Youth career
- 2012–2017: Ulsan Hyundai (Note: Played for Hyundai Middle School from 2012 to 2014, and Hyundai High School from 2015 to 2017, which were academies of Ulsan Hyundai.)

Senior career*
Years	Team	Apps	(Gls)
2018–2021	Ulsan Hyundai	22	(7)
2019	→ Asan Mugunghwa (loan)	30	(7)
2020–2021	→ Gimcheon Sangmu (draft)	17	(4)
2022–2024	Shimizu S-Pulse	38	(3)
2024	→ Machida Zelvia (loan)	33	(8)
2025–2026	Machida Zelvia	31	(2)
2026	→ Shimizu S-Pulse (loan)	0	(0)
2026–	Shimizu S-Pulse	13	(2)

International career^{‡}
2015–2016	South Korea U17	11 (Note: Includes two appearances against clubs.)	(1)
2017–2019	South Korea U20	21	(3)
2019–	South Korea U23	18 (Note: Includes two appearances against another KFA team.)	(5)
2024–	South Korea	16	(4)
Medal record
Men's football
Representing South Korea
FIFA U-20 World Cup
Runner-up	2019 Poland
AFC U-23 Championship
Winner	2020 Thailand
AFC U-19 Championship
Runner-up	2018 Indonesia
EAFF Championship
Runner-up	2025 South Korea
- * Club domestic league appearances and goals as of 7 November 2026 ‡ National team caps and goals as of 17 November 2026

- Oh Se-hun
- Hangul: 오세훈
- RR: O Sehun
- MR: O Sehun

Oh Se-hun (Korean: 오세훈; born 15 January 1999) is a South Korean professional footballer who plays as a centre-forward for J1 League club Shimizu S-Pulse, and the South Korea national team.

== Club career ==
=== Ulsan Hyundai ===
A graduate from the football club of Hyundai High School, known as an academy of K League 1 side Ulsan Hyundai, he signed his first professional contract with the club's senior team in 2018. He was originally set to reinforce their reserve team at the R League, but made an unexpected debut as a starter under manager Kim Do-hoon in the club's league opener against Jeonbuk Hyundai Motors on 1 March 2018. He played 56 minutes before being replaced by Júnior Negrão, and his side eventually suffered a 2–0 away loss. After playing his first AFC Champions League match as a 70th-minute substitute in a 2–2 away draw with Kawasaki Frontale on 18 April, he appeared as a substitute in two more K League 1 matches against Suwon Samsung Bluewings and Pohang Steelers in May.

==== Loan to Asan Mugunghwa ====
On 24 January 2019, Oh moved on loan to K League 2 club Asan Mugunghwa, whose status was going to be changed from the police's club to a city-owned club due to a plan to abolish the auxiliary police in South Korea. On 2 March, he made his Asan debut and first professional goal in a 3–0 away win over Jeonnam Dragons. He got more opportunities at the new club, scoring seven goals in 30 K League 2 matches.

==== Enlistment in Gimcheon Sangmu ====
Prior to the 2020 season, Oh decided to serve his compulsory military duty, enlisting in military-owned K League 1 club Sangju Sangmu (renamed Gimcheon Sangmu the next year). After finishing his military recruit training, on 29 April, he got into the club's car, which was going to arrive at a clinic, to be tested for COVID-19, but was in a car accident. On 13 June, he made a late debut for Sangmu in a 4–2 home loss to Pohang Steelers, where he scored both of Sangmu's goals. On 22 July, he had one goal and one assist in a 2–0 home win over Daegu FC, being named the Most Valuable Player of the Round by the league's federation. Since September, he took breaks due to aftereffects of the car accident and training at the national under-23 team. He had four goals and two assists in 13 matches for about two months despite his poor physical condition.

After making four lethargic appearances in the first half of the 2021 season, Oh was discharged from Sangmu and returned to Ulsan.

==== Return to Ulsan ====
Just after completing his military service at Sangmu, Oh played Group F matches of the 2021 AFC Champions League held in Thailand for Ulsan. On 26 June, he provided an assist for the team's winning goal in the first match against Viettel, where they won 1–0. On 2 July, he scored his first and second goals for Ulsan in a 3–0 win over Kaya–Iloilo, where the club set a new tournament record of 12 consecutive wins. He had three goals and two assists in six group stage matches, helping his team win all the matches. On 29 August, he scored his first goal at Ulsan Munsu Football Stadium, Ulsan's home stadium, in a 3–2 win over Incheon United. On 21 November, he scored two goals in a 3–1 home win over Jeju United, and was selected as the league's MVP of the Round for the second time. At all competitions during the second half of the 2021 season, he played 29 matches for Ulsan, and had 10 goals and four assists.

=== Shimizu S-Pulse ===
On 24 February 2022, Oh joined J1 League side Shimizu S-Pulse on a permanent deal. He scored his first goal for Shimizu in a 1–1 draw with Gamba Osaka on 10 April, his second J1 League match, but faced competition from Thiago Santana and Yūta Kamiya. He played only two matches as a starter until July, and was sidelined by sprains since August.

After Shimizu were relegated to the J2 League, Oh had two goals and five assists in 25 league appearances including six starts the next year.

=== Machida Zelvia ===
On 5 January 2024, Oh joined newly-promoted J1 League club Machida Zelvia on a season-long loan. On 30 March, he scored his first and second goals for Zelvia in a 3–1 home win over Sagan Tosu. During the 2024 J1 League, he had eight goals and two assists in 33 matches, contributing to Zelvia's third-place finish along with his compatriot Na Sang-ho.

On 5 January 2025, Oh signed a permanent deal with Zelvia. On 20 July, he was criticised for attacking opposing defender Hiroto Taniguchi with his knee irrespective of the ball in the middle of a league match against Tokyo Verdy by the press and fans. His controversial act was not followed by the referee's whistle. He scored only two goals at the league, but he led the club to their first-ever final at the Emperor's Cup by making one goal and one assist in the 2–0 semi-final win over FC Tokyo. On 22 November, he and Na Sang-ho came on as 65th-minute substitutes in the 3–1 Emperor's Cup final win over Vissel Kobe, and won his and the club's first major title.

=== Return to Shimizu ===
On 1 February 2026, Oh moved to his former club Shimizu on a five-month loan. At the J1 100 Year Vision League, he scored seven goals including a seventh-second goal against V-Varen Nagasaki during 19 appearances. His record of seven seconds was faster than a J1 League record of eight seconds, set by Hisato Satō in 2006, but was not officially recognised because it did not occur in the regular season. He received the league's Monthly MVP award for March.

On 27 June, Shimizu converted Oh's loan deal into a permanent deal.

== International career ==
Oh started to represent South Korea at the 2015 FIFA U-17 World Cup. Under manager Choi Jin-cheul, he played four matches as a substitute until the round of 16, where South Korea lost 2–0 to Belgium, and scored the winning goal in a 1–0 win over Guinea.

By manager Chung Jung-yong, Oh was called up to the South Korea under-20 team for the 2018 Toulon Tournament and the 2018 AFC U-19 Championship. He played only two matches as a starter at the latter, where his country qualified for the 2019 FIFA U-20 World Cup as runners-up. At the U-20 World Cup, however, he became their main striker, playing all seven matches until the final including six as a starter. Before South Korea lost to Ukraine in the final, he scored each of two headers against Argentina and Japan, and scored his team's last penalty in a penalty shoot-out win over Senegal.

Oh was selected for the South Korea under-23 team for the 2020 AFC U-23 Championship by manager Kim Hak-bum. He scored a brace in their 2–1 win over Uzbekistan. After getting involved in Taeguk Warriors' first victory at the competition and qualification for the 2020 Summer Olympics, he was selected for the Team of the Tournament by Fox Sports Asia.

On 6 June 2024, Oh made his senior international debut as a 87th-minute substitute for Son Heung-min in a FIFA World Cup qualifier against Singapore, which ended in a 7–0 win. On 15 October, he scored his first international goal in a World Cup qualifier against Iraq, where South Korea won 3–2.

== Style of play ==
Oh is a center-forward, who performs the role of target man. Noted for his physique and aerial ability, he is frequently compared with Kim Shin-wook, another South Korean international and his role model.

== Career statistics ==
=== Club ===
As of match played 7 November 2026

Appearances and goals by club, season and competition
Club	Season	League			Cup (Note: Includes Korean FA Cup, Emperor's Cup)		League cup (Note: Includes J.League Cup)		Continental (Note: Includes AFC Champions League Elite)		Other		Total	
Club	Season	Division	Apps	Goals	Apps	Goals	Apps	Goals	Apps	Goals	Apps	Goals	Apps	Goals
Ulsan Hyundai	2018	K League 1	3	0	0	0	—		1	0	—		4	0
Ulsan Hyundai	2021	K League 1	19	7	1	0	—		9	3	—		29	10
Ulsan Hyundai	Total		22	7	1	0	—		10	3	—		33	10
Asan Mugunghwa (loan)	2019	K League 2	30	7	0	0	—		—		—		30	7
Gimcheon Sangmu (draft)	2020	K League 1	13	4	0	0	—		—		—		13	4
Gimcheon Sangmu (draft)	2021	K League 2	4	0	0	0	—		—		—		4	0
Gimcheon Sangmu (draft)	Total		17	4	0	0	—		—		—		17	4
Shimizu S-Pulse	2022	J1 League	13	1	1	0	2	0	—		—		16	1
Shimizu S-Pulse	2023	J2 League	25	2	1	0	4	1	—		—		30	3
Shimizu S-Pulse	Total		38	3	2	0	6	1	—		—		46	4
Machida Zelvia (loan)	2024	J1 League	33	8	0	0	0	0	—		—		33	8
Machida Zelvia	2025	J1 League	31	2	2	1	0	0	6	2	—		39	5
Shimizu S-Pulse (loan)	2026–27	J1 League	—		—		—		—		19 (Note: Appearances in J1 100 Year Vision League)	7	19	7
Shimizu S-Pulse	2026–27	J1 League	13	2	1	1	0	0	—		—		14	3
Career total			184	33	6	2	6	1	16	5	19	7	231	48

=== International ===
As of match played 17 November 2026

Appearances and goals by national team and year
National team	Year	Apps	Goals
South Korea	2024	6	2
South Korea	2025	4	0
South Korea	2026	6	2
Total		16	4

Scores and results list South Korea's goal tally first.

List of international goals scored by Oh Se-hun
No.	Date	Venue	Opponent	Score	Result	Competition
1	15 October 2024	Yongin Mireu Stadium, Yongin, South Korea	Iraq	1–0	3–2	2026 FIFA World Cup qualification
2	14 November 2024	Jaber Al-Ahmad International Stadium, Kuwait City, Kuwait	Kuwait	1–0	3–1	2026 FIFA World Cup qualification
3	6 October 2026	Yongin Mireu Stadium, Yongin, South Korea	Uzbekistan	2–0	2–0	Friendly
4	17 November 2026	Abdullah bin Khalifa Stadium, Doha, Qatar	Qatar	1–0	1–0	Friendly

== Honours ==
Machida Zelvia

- Emperor's Cup: 2025

South Korea U20

- FIFA U-20 World Cup runner-up: 2019
- AFC U-19 Championship runner-up: 2018

South Korea U23

- AFC U-23 Championship: 2020

South Korea

- EAFF Championship runner-up: 2025

Individual

- Korean FA Young Player of the Year: 2017
- J1 100 Year Vision League Monthly MVP (West): March 2026
