= 2021 AFC Champions League =

40th edition of premier club football tournament organized by the AFC

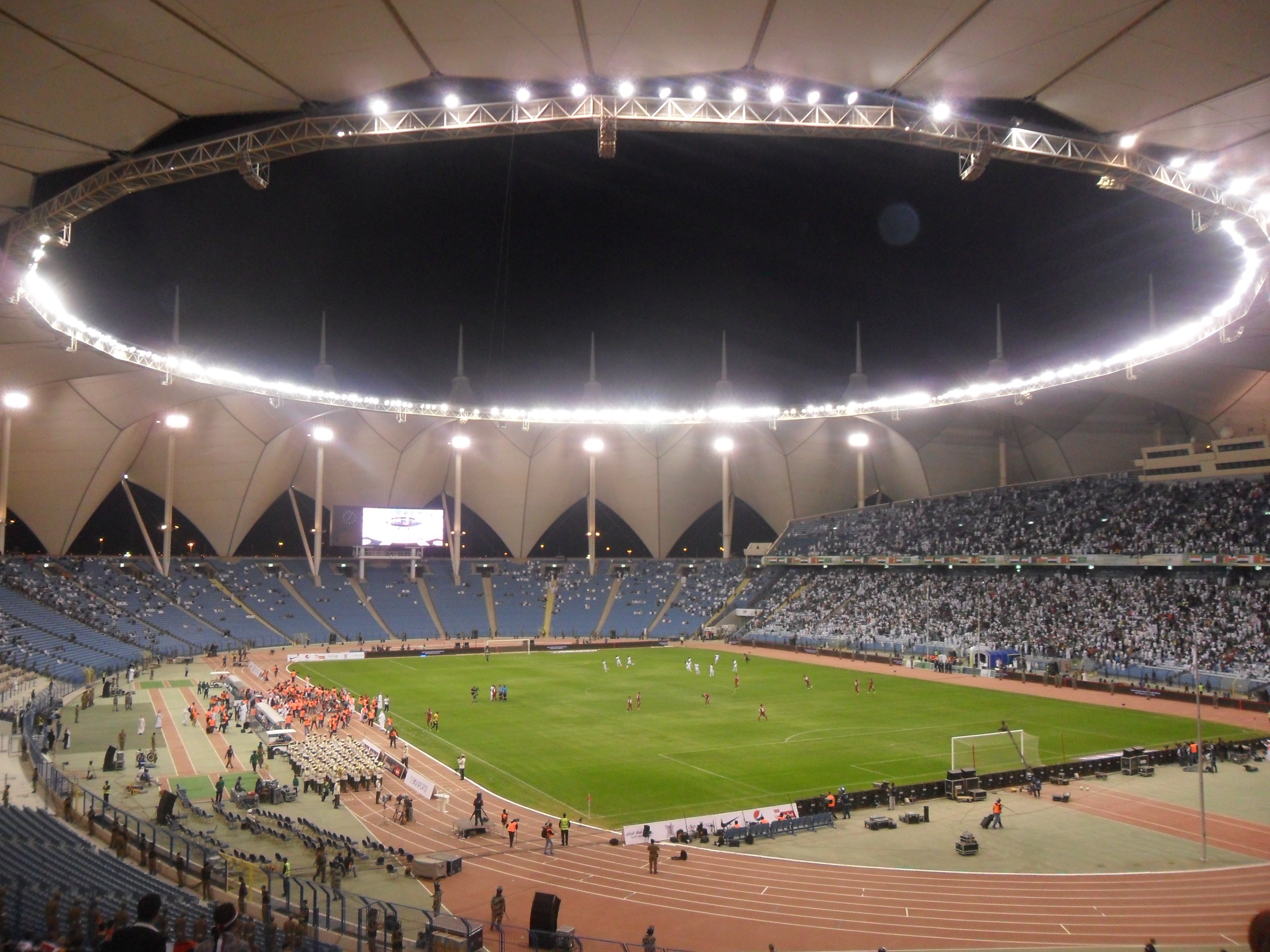
- The King Fahd International Stadium in Riyadh hosted the final

Tournament details
- Dates: Qualifying: 7–10 April 2021 (W); 23 June 2021 (E); Competition proper: 14 April – 23 November 2021
- Teams: Competition: 40; Total: 49 (from 20 associations)

Final positions
- Champions: (Saudi Arabia) Al-Hilal (4th title)
- Runners-up: (South Korea) Pohang Steelers

Tournament statistics
- Matches played: 135
- Goals scored: 379 (2.81 per match)
- Attendance: 147,086 (1,090 per match)
- Top scorer(s): Michael Olunga (9 goals)
- Best player: Salem Al-Dawsari
- Fair play award: (Saudi Arabia) Al-Hilal
- (Note: All statistics do not include qualifying play-offs)

The 2021 AFC Champions League was the 40th edition of Asia's premier club football tournament organized by the Asian Football Confederation (AFC), and the 19th under the current AFC Champions League title.

Al-Hilal won their fourth title by defeating Pohang Steelers 2–0 in the final, becoming the most successful team in the history of the competition. As winners, they automatically qualified for the 2022 AFC Champions League (although they had already qualified through their domestic performance). They also earned the right to play in the 2021 FIFA Club World Cup in the United Arab Emirates and the 2025 FIFA Club World Cup in the United States.

The tournament was the first to involve 40 teams during the group stage, with an increase from the previous 32 teams.

Ulsan Hyundai of South Korea were the defending champions, but were eliminated in the semi-finals by fellow South Korean club Pohang Steelers.

== Association team allocation ==
The 46 AFC member associations (excluding the Northern Mariana Islands, which became a full member in December 2020 and were not eligible for this season) were ranked based on their clubs' performance over the last four years in AFC competitions (their national team's FIFA World Rankings no longer considered). The slots were allocated by the following criteria according to the Entry Manual:

- The associations were split into two regions (Article 3.1):
  - West Region consisted of the 25 associations from the West Asian Football Federation (WAFF), the South Asian Football Federation (SAFF), and the Central Asian Football Association (CAFA).
  - East Region consisted of the 21 associations from the ASEAN Football Federation (AFF) and the East Asian Football Federation (EAFF).
  - The AFC could reallocate one or more associations to another region if necessary for sporting reasons.
- The top 12 associations in each region were eligible to enter the AFC Champions League.
- In each region, there were five groups in the group stage, including 16 direct slots, with the 4 remaining slots filled through qualifying play-offs (Article 3.2). The slots in each region were distributed as follows:
  - The associations ranked 1st and 2nd were each allocated three direct slots and one play-off slot.
  - The associations ranked 3rd and 4th were each allocated two direct slots and two play-off slots.
  - The associations ranked 5th were each allocated one direct slot and two play-off slots.
  - The associations ranked 6th were each allocated one direct slot and one play-off slot.
  - The associations ranked 7th to 10th were each allocated one direct slot.
  - The associations ranked 11th to 12th were each allocated one play-off slot.
- The AFC Champions League title holders and AFC Cup title holders were each allocated one play-off slot should they not qualify for the tournament through domestic performance (Article 3.6). However, there were no AFC Cup title holders for this season as the 2020 AFC Cup was cancelled due to the COVID-19 pandemic. The following rules were applied:
  - If the AFC Champions League title holders or AFC Cup title holders were from associations ranked 1st to 6th, their association was allocated the same number of play-off slots, and they replaced the lowest-seeded team from their association. Otherwise, their association was allocated one additional play-off slot, and they did not replace any team from their association (Articles 3.8, 3.9 and 3.10).
  - If both the AFC Champions League title holders and AFC Cup title holders were from the same association which was allocated only one play-off slot, their association was allocated one additional play-off slot, and only the lowest-seeded team from their association was replaced as a result (Article 3.11).
  - The AFC Champions League title holders and AFC Cup title holders were the lowest-seeded teams in the qualifying play-offs if they did not replace any team from their association (Article 3.12).
- If any association ranked 1st to 6th did not fulfill any one of the AFC Champions League criteria, they had all their direct slots converted into play-off slots. The direct slots given up were redistributed to the highest eligible association by the following criteria (Articles 3.13 and 3.14):
  - For each association, the maximum number of total slots was four and the maximum number of direct slots is three (Articles 3.4 and 3.5).
  - If any association ranked 3rd to 6th was allocated one additional direct slot, one play-off slot was annulled and not redistributed.
  - If any association ranked 5th to 6th was allocated two additional direct slots, one play-off slot was annulled and not redistributed.
- If any association ranked 7th to 10th did not fulfill any one of the AFC Champions League criteria, they had their direct slot converted into play-off slot. The direct slot given up was redistributed to the next association ranked 11th or 12th, whose play-off slot was annulled and not redistributed, or if neither were eligible, the highest eligible association by the same criteria as mentioned above (Articles 3.16 and 3.17).
- If any association with only play-off slot(s), including any association ranked 11th to 12th or those mentioned above, did not fulfill the minimum AFC Champions League criteria, the play-off slot(s) were annulled and not redistributed (Articles 3.19 and 3.20).
- For each association, the maximum number of total slots was one-third of the total number of eligible teams (excluding foreign teams) in the top division (Article 3.4). If this rule was applied, any direct slots given up were redistributed by the same criteria as mentioned above, and play-off slots were annulled and not redistributed (Article 9.10).
- All participating teams had to be granted an AFC Champions League license, and apart from cup winners, finish in the top half of their top division (Articles 7.1 and 9.5). If any association did not have enough teams which satisfied these criteria, any direct slots given up were redistributed by the same criteria as mentioned above, and play-off slots were annulled and not redistributed (Article 9.9).
- If any team granted a license refused to participate, their slot, either direct or play-off, was annulled and not redistributed (Article 9.11).

=== Association ranking ===
For the 2021 AFC Champions League, the associations were allocated slots according to their association ranking which was published on 29 November 2019, which took into account their performance in the AFC Champions League and the AFC Cup during the period between 2016 and 2019.

Participation for 2021 AFC Champions League
Participating
Not participating

West Region (5 groups)
Rank		Member Association	Points	Slots		
Rank		Member Association	Points	Group stage	Play-off	
Region	AFC	Member Association	Points	Group stage	Play-off round	Prelim. round
1	2	Qatar	97.644	3	1	0
2	4	Saudi Arabia	88.449	3	1	0
3	6	Iran	81.724	3	1	0
4	7	United Arab Emirates	61.870	2	2	0
5	9	Iraq	48.992	1	2	0
6	10	Uzbekistan	45.562	1	1	0
7	12	Jordan	33.852	1	0	0
8	15	India	29.576	1	0	0
9	17	Tajikistan	28.361	1	0	0
10	20	Turkmenistan	26.532	0	0	0
11	21	Lebanon	24.746	0	0	0
12	22	Syria	22.505	0	0	0
Total		Participating associations: 9		16	8	0
Total		Participating associations: 9		16	8	
Total		Participating associations: 9		24		

East Region (5 groups)
Rank		Member Association	Points	Slots		
Rank		Member Association	Points	Group stage	Play-off	
Region	AFC	Member Association	Points	Group stage	Play-off round	Prelim. round
1	1	China	100.000	2	1	0
2	3	Japan	93.321	4	0	0
3	5	South Korea	85.979	4	0	0
4	8	Thailand	51.189	4	0	0
5	11	Australia	40.896	0	1	2
6	13	Philippines	32.130	1	1	0
7	14	North Korea	30.100	0	0	0
8	16	Vietnam	28.571	1	0	0
9	18	Malaysia	26.960	1	0	0
10	19	Singapore	26.607	1	0	0
11	23	Hong Kong	19.945	1	0	0
12	27	Myanmar	12.756	0	0	1
Total		Participating associations: 9		19	2	0
Total		Participating associations: 9		19	2	
Total		Participating associations: 9		21		

Notes

1. Turkmenistan (TKM): The only team from Turkmenistan granted an AFC Champions League license, Köpetdag, withdrew from the competition before the draw.
2. Lebanon (LBN): No teams from Lebanon were granted an AFC Champions League license.
3. Syria (SYR): No teams from Syria were granted an AFC Champions League license.
4. China (CHN): One of the four teams from China that originally entered the AFC Champions League, Jiangsu, withdrew from the competition and folded after the draw.
5. Australia (AUS): The three teams from Australia who originally entered the AFC Champions League, Sydney FC, Melbourne City and Brisbane Roar, withdrew from the competition after the draw.
6. North Korea (PRK): No teams from North Korea were granted an AFC Champions League license.
7. Myanmar (MYA): The team from Myanmar who originally entered the AFC Champions League, Shan United, withdrew from the competition after the draw.

== Teams ==
In the following table, the number of appearances and last appearance count only those since the 2002–03 season (including qualifying rounds), when the competition was rebranded as the AFC Champions League.

West RegionGroup stage direct entrants (Groups A–E)
Team	Qualifying method	App. (last)
(Qatar) Al-Duhail	2019–20 Qatar Stars League champions	10th (2020)
(Qatar) Al-Sadd	2020 Emir of Qatar Cup winners 2019–20 Qatar Stars League third place	16th (2020)
(Qatar) Al-Rayyan	2019–20 Qatar Stars League runners-up	11th (2020)
(Saudi Arabia) Al-Hilal	2019–20 Saudi Professional League champions and 2019–20 King Cup winners	17th (2020)
(Saudi Arabia) Al-Nassr	2019–20 Saudi Professional League runners-up	6th (2020)
(Saudi Arabia) Al-Ahli	2019–20 Saudi Professional League third place	13th (2020)
(Iran) Persepolis	2019–20 Persian Gulf Pro League champions and 2020 Iranian Super Cup winners	10th (2020)
(Iran) Tractor	2019–20 Hazfi Cup winners	6th (2018)
(Iran) Esteghlal	2019–20 Persian Gulf Pro League runners-up	11th (2020)
(United Arab Emirates) Sharjah	2018–19 UAE Pro League champions	4th (2020)
(United Arab Emirates) Shabab Al-Ahli	2018–19 UAE President's Cup winners 2018–19 UAE Pro League runners-up	9th (2020)
(Iraq) Al-Shorta	2018–19 Iraqi Premier League champions	5th (2020)
(Uzbekistan) Pakhtakor	2020 Uzbekistan Super League champions and 2020 Uzbekistan Cup winners	17th (2020)
(Jordan) Al-Wehdat	2020 Jordanian Pro League champions	6th (2019)
(India) Goa	2019–20 Indian Super League league shield winners	1st
(Tajikistan) Istiklol	2020 Tajikistan Higher League champions	3rd (2020)

Qualifying play-off participants: Entering in play-off round
Team	Qualifying method	App. (last)
(Qatar) Al-Gharafa	2019–20 Qatar Stars League fourth place	11th (2019)
(Saudi Arabia) Al-Wehda	2019–20 Saudi Professional League fourth place	1st
(Iran) Foolad	2019–20 Persian Gulf Pro League third place	4th (2015)
(United Arab Emirates) Al-Wahda	2018–19 UAE Pro League third place	12th (2020)
(United Arab Emirates) Al-Ain	2018–19 UAE Pro League fourth place	16th (2020)
(Iraq) Al-Zawraa	2018–19 Iraq FA Cup winners	6th (2020)
(Iraq) Al-Quwa Al-Jawiya	2018–19 Iraqi Premier League runners-up	5th (2019)
(Uzbekistan) AGMK	2020 Uzbekistan Super League third place	2nd (2019)

Withdrawn teams
Team	Qualifying method	App. (last)
(Turkmenistan) Köpetdag	2020 Ýokary Liga fourth place	1st

East RegionGroup stage direct entrants (Groups F–J)
Team	Qualifying method	App. (last)
(China) Guangzhou	2020 Chinese Super League runners-up	10th (2020)
(China) Beijing Guoan	2020 Chinese Super League third place	10th (2020)
(Japan) Kawasaki Frontale	2020 J1 League champions and 2020 Emperor's Cup winners	8th (2019)
(Japan) Gamba Osaka	2020 J1 League runners-up	10th (2017)
(Japan) Nagoya Grampus	2020 J1 League third place	4th (2012)
(Japan) Cerezo Osaka	2020 J1 League fourth place	4th (2018)
(South Korea) Jeonbuk Hyundai Motors	2020 K League 1 champions and 2020 Korean FA Cup winners	14th (2020)
(South Korea) Ulsan Hyundai	2020 K League 1 runners-up	9th (2020)
(South Korea) Pohang Steelers	2020 K League 1 third place	8th (2016)
(South Korea) Daegu FC	2020 K League 1 fifth place	2nd (2019)
(Thailand) BG Pathum United	2020–21 Thai League 1 first place after first half of season	2nd (2015)
(Thailand) Port	2020–21 Thai League 1 second place after first half of season	2nd (2020)
(Thailand) Chiangrai United	2020–21 Thai League 1 third place after first half of season	4th (2020)
(Thailand) Ratchaburi Mitr Phol	2020–21 Thai League 1 fourth place after first half of season	1st
(Philippines) United City	2020 Philippines Football League champions	4th (2020)
(Vietnam) Viettel	2020 V.League 1 champions	1st
(Malaysia) Johor Darul Ta'zim	2020 Malaysia Super League champions	7th (2020)
(Singapore) Tampines Rovers	2020 Singapore Premier League runners-up	6th (2020)
(Hong Kong) Kitchee	2019–20 Hong Kong Premier League champions	6th (2019)

Qualifying play-off participants: Entering in play-off round
Team	Qualifying method	App. (last)
(China) Shanghai Port	2020 Chinese Super League fourth place	6th (2020)
(Philippines) Kaya–Iloilo	2020 Philippines Football League runners-up	1st

Withdrawn teams
Team	Qualifying method	App. (last)
(China) Jiangsu	2020 Chinese Super League champions	4th (2017)
(Australia) Sydney FC	2019–20 A-League regular season premiers and 2020 A-League Grand Final winners	7th (2020)
(Australia) Melbourne City	2019–20 A-League regular season runners-up	1st
(Australia) Brisbane Roar	2019–20 A-League regular season fourth place	6th (2018)
(Myanmar) Shan United	2020 Myanmar National League champions	3rd (2020)

Notes

1. Title holders (TH): Ulsan Hyundai were the title holders.
2. Australia (AUS): Wellington Phoenix, the 2019–20 A-League regular season third place, were a team from New Zealand and thus ineligible to represent Australia in AFC club competitions. As a result, Brisbane Roar, the regular season fourth place, qualify for the 2021 AFC Champions League as Australia 3.
3. China (CHN): On 8 February 2021, the AFC announced that Shandong Taishan, the 2020 Chinese FA Cup winners, had not satisfied the mandatory Criterion F.04 of the AFC Club Licensing Regulations (Edition 2016) concerning overdue payments: their licence was withdrawn by the AFC's independent Entry Control Body and the club was disqualified from the 2021 AFC Champions League. As a result, Shanghai Port qualified for the 2021 AFC Champions League, and Beijing Guoan entered the group stage instead of the qualifying play-offs. On 28 February 2021, league champions Jiangsu withdrew from the 2021 AFC Champions League and folded.
4. Iraq (IRQ): Due to the COVID-19 pandemic in Iraq, the 2019–20 Iraqi Premier League and the 2019–20 Iraq FA Cup were cancelled and the titles withheld by the Iraq Football Association. Originally a play-off was to be held to determine the teams from Iraq playing in the 2021 AFC Champions League. However, it was later decided that the results of the previous domestic season (2018–19 Iraqi Premier League and 2018–19 Iraq FA Cup) would be used.
5. South Korea (KOR): Sangju Sangmu, the 2020 K League 1 fourth place, are a military team and have confirmed that the team would move its franchise city in the 2021 season and would be relegated to K League 2 regardless of their final position in the 2020 season. As a result, Daegu FC, the 2020 K League 1 fifth place, qualified for the 2021 AFC Champions League.
6. Philippines (PHI): Due to the COVID-19 pandemic in the Philippines, the 2020 Copa Paulino Alcantara was cancelled by the Philippine Football Federation. The teams from the Philippines playing in the 2021 AFC Champions League were determined only by the results of the 2020 Philippines Football League.
7. Replacement 1 (RE1): Pohang Steelers and Ratchaburi Mitr Phol entered the group stage instead of the qualifying play-offs after Jiangsu withdrew and folded.
8. Replacement 2 (RE2): Australian teams Sydney FC, Melbourne City, and Brisbane Roar withdrew from the competition after the draw. Chiangrai United, Daegu FC, and Cerezo Osaka entered the group stage instead of the qualifying play-offs and Kaya–Iloilo entered the qualifying play-offs instead of the preliminary round.
9. Singapore (SGP): Albirex Niigata (S), the 2020 Singapore Premier League champions, are a team from Japan and thus ineligible to represent Singapore in AFC club competitions. As a result, Tampines Rovers, the 2020 Singapore Premier League runners-up, qualified for the 2021 AFC Champions League.
10. Thailand (THA): Due to the COVID-19 pandemic in Thailand, the Football Association of Thailand extended both the 2020 Thai League 1 and 2020 Thai FA Cup to be completed in 2021. The teams from Thailand playing in the 2021 AFC Champions League were determined by the results of the 2020–21 Thai League 1 after the first half of the season (Round 15).
11. Turkmenistan (TKM): Altyn Asyr, the 2020 Ýokary Liga champions, were not granted an AFC Champions League license. As a result, Köpetdag, the league fourth place and the best team granted an AFC Champions League license, qualify for the 2021 AFC Champions League as Turkmenistan 1.
12. United Arab Emirates (UAE): Due to the COVID-19 pandemic in the United Arab Emirates, the 2019–20 UAE Pro League and the 2019–20 UAE President's Cup were cancelled and the titles withheld by the United Arab Emirates Football Association. The teams from the United Arab Emirates playing in the 2021 AFC Champions League were determined by the results of the previous domestic season (2018–19 UAE Pro League and 2018–19 UAE President's Cup).
13. Uzbekistan (UZB): Nasaf, the 2020 Uzbekistan Super League runners-up, were not granted an AFC Champions League license. As a result, AGMK, the second best team granted an AFC Champions League license (2020 Uzbekistan Super League third place), qualified for the 2021 AFC Champions League.
Location of teams of the 2021 AFC Champions League.
Brown: Group A; Red: Group B; Orange: Group C; Yellow: Group D; Pink: Group E;
Green: Group F; Blue: Group G; Cyan: Group H; Turquoise: Group I; Purple: Group J;
Qualifying play-offs

== Schedule ==
The schedule of the competition was as follows.

On 25 January 2021, the AFC published the schedule of the competition. The group stage was played as a centralized double round-robin tournament, and the round of 16 and quarter-finals were played as a single match.

Notes:

- W: West Region
- E: East Region

Stage	Round	Draw date	Match date
Preliminary stage	Preliminary round	No draw	20 June 2021 (E)
Play-off stage	Play-off round	No draw	7–10 April 2021 (W), 23 June 2021 (E)
Group stage	Matchday 1	27 January 2021	14–15 April 2021 (W), 22–26 June 2021 (E)
Group stage	Matchday 2	27 January 2021	17–18 April 2021 (W), 25–29 June 2021 (E)
Group stage	Matchday 3	27 January 2021	20–21 April 2021 (W), 28 June – 2 July 2021 (E)
Group stage	Matchday 4	27 January 2021	23–24 April 2021 (W), 1–5 July 2021 (E)
Group stage	Matchday 5	27 January 2021	26–27 April 2021 (W), 4–8 July 2021 (E)
Group stage	Matchday 6	27 January 2021	29–30 April 2021 (W), 7–11 July 2021 (E)
Knockout stage	Round of 16	27 January 2021	13–15 September 2021
Knockout stage	Quarter-finals	17 September 2021	16–17 October 2021
Knockout stage	Semi-finals	17 September 2021	19–20 October 2021
Knockout stage	Final	17 September 2021	23 November 2021 at King Fahd International Stadium, Riyadh

The original schedule of the competition, as planned before the pandemic, was as follows.

Original schedule for 2021 AFC Champions League
Stage	Round	Draw date	First leg	Second leg
Preliminary stage	Preliminary round	No draw	26 January 2021	
Play-off stage	Play-off round	No draw	2 February 2021	
Group stage	Matchday 1	TBD	15–16 February 2021 (W), 23–24 February 2021 (E)	
Group stage	Matchday 2	TBD	22–23 February 2021 (W), 2–3 March 2021 (E)	
Group stage	Matchday 3	TBD	8–9 March 2021 (W), 16–17 March 2021 (E)	
Group stage	Matchday 4	TBD	5–7 April 2021	
Group stage	Matchday 5	TBD	19–21 April 2021	
Group stage	Matchday 6	TBD	3–5 May 2021	
Knockout stage	Round of 16	TBD	17–19 May 2021	24–26 May 2021
Knockout stage	Quarter-finals	TBD	23–25 August 2021	13–15 September 2021
Knockout stage	Semi-finals	TBD	28–29 September 2021	19–20 October 2021
Knockout stage	Final	TBD	21 November 2021	27 November 2021

== Qualifying play-offs ==
In the qualifying play-offs, each tie was played as a single match. Extra time and penalty shoot-out were used to decide the winner if necessary. The bracket of the qualifying play-offs for each region was determined based on each team's association ranking and their seeding within their association, with the team from the higher-ranked association hosting the match in the West Region. Teams from the same association could not be placed into the same tie. The eight winners of the play-off round (four each from both West Region and East Region) advanced to the group stage to join the 32 direct entrants.

=== Preliminary round ===
East Region
Team 1	Score	Team 2
Brisbane Roar (Australia)	Cancelled (Note: Australian teams Sydney FC, Melbourne City, and Brisbane Roar withdrew from the competition after the draw. Chiangrai United, Daegu FC, and Cerezo Osaka entered the group stage instead of the qualifying play-offs and Kaya–Iloilo entered the qualifying play-offs instead of the preliminary round.)	(Philippines) Kaya–Iloilo
Melbourne City (Australia)	Cancelled (Note: Shan United withdrew from the AFC Champions League following the state of emergency in Myanmar and Melbourne City would enter the play-off round instead of the preliminary round. Later, Melbourne City FC also withdrew, along the other Australian teams: their opponent Cerezo Osaka entered the group stage.)	(Myanmar) Shan United

=== Play-off round ===
West Region
Team 1	Score	Team 2
Al-Gharafa (Qatar)	0–1 (a.e.t.)	(Uzbekistan) AGMK
Al-Wehda (Saudi Arabia)	1–1 (a.e.t.) (2–3 p)	(Iraq) Al-Quwa Al-Jawiya
Foolad (Iran)	4–0	(United Arab Emirates) Al-Ain
Al-Wahda (United Arab Emirates)	2–1	(Iraq) Al-Zawraa

East Region
Team 1	Score	Team 2
Shanghai Port (China)	0–1	(Philippines) Kaya–Iloilo
Cerezo Osaka (Japan)	Cancelled	(Australia) Melbourne City
Pohang Steelers (South Korea)	Cancelled (Note: Pohang Steelers and Ratchaburi Mitr Phol entered the group stage instead of the qualifying play-offs after Jiangsu withdrew from the AFC Champions League and folded.)	(Thailand) Ratchaburi Mitr Phol
Daegu FC (South Korea)	Cancelled	(Thailand) Chiangrai United

== Group stage ==
The draw for the group stage was held at the AFC House in Kuala Lumpur, Malaysia, on 27 January 2021. The 40 teams were drawn into ten groups of four: five groups each in the West Region (Groups A–E) and the East Region (Groups F–J). For each zone, teams were seeded into four pots and drawn into the relevant positions within each group, based on their association ranking and their seeding within their association, in consideration of technical balance between groups. Teams from the same association could not be drawn into the same group. In the group stage, each group was played on a double round-robin basis in centralised venues. The winners of each group and three best runners-up from each region advanced to the round of 16 of the knockout stage.

Tiebreakers

The teams were ranked according to points (3 points for a win, 1 point for a draw, 0 points for a loss). If tied on points, tiebreakers were applied in the following order (Regulations Article 8.3):

1. Points in head-to-head matches among tied teams;
2. Goal difference in head-to-head matches among tied teams;
3. Goals scored in head-to-head matches among tied teams;
4. ~~Away goals scored in head-to-head matches among tied teams;~~ (not applicable since the matches were played in centralised venue)
5. If more than two teams were tied, and after applying all head-to-head criteria above, a subset of teams were still tied, all head-to-head criteria above were reapplied exclusively to this subset of teams;
6. Goal difference in all group matches;
7. Goals scored in all group matches;
8. Penalty shoot-out if only two teams playing each other in the last round of the group are tied;
9. Disciplinary points (yellow card = 1 point, red card as a result of two yellow cards = 3 points, direct red card = 3 points, yellow card followed by direct red card = 4 points);
10. Association ranking.

=== Group A ===
Pos	Team	Pld	W	D	L	GF	GA	GD	Pts	Qualification	IST	HIL	SAH	AGK
1	(Tajikistan) Istiklol	6	3	1	2	10	8	+2	10 (Note: Head-to-head goal difference: Istiklol 1, Al Hilal −1.)	Advance to Round of 16	—	4–1	0–0	1–2
2	(Saudi Arabia) Al-Hilal (H)	6	3	1	2	11	9	+2	10	Advance to Round of 16	3–1	—	0–2	2–2
3	(United Arab Emirates) Shabab Al-Ahli	6	2	1	3	6	6	0	7 (Note: Head-to-head goal difference: Shabab Al-Ahli 1, AGMK −1.)		0–1	0–2	—	3–1
4	(Uzbekistan) AGMK	6	2	1	3	9	13	−4	7		2–3	0–3	2–1	—

Source: AFC
(H) Hosts

=== Group B ===
Pos	Team	Pld	W	D	L	GF	GA	GD	Pts	Qualification	SHA	TRA	PAK	QWJ
1	(United Arab Emirates) Sharjah (H)	6	3	2	1	9	6	+3	11	Advance to Round of 16	—	0–2	4–1	1–0
2	(Iran) Tractor	6	2	4	0	6	3	+3	10	Advance to Round of 16	0–0	—	0–0	1–0
3	(Uzbekistan) Pakhtakor	6	1	4	1	6	8	−2	7		1–1	3–3	—	1–0
4	(Iraq) Al-Quwa Al-Jawiya	6	0	2	4	2	6	−4	2		2–3	0–0	0–0	—

Source: AFC
(H) Hosts

=== Group C ===
Pos	Team	Pld	W	D	L	GF	GA	GD	Pts	Qualification	EST	DUH	AHL	SHO
1	(Iran) Esteghlal	6	3	2	1	14	8	+6	11	Advance to Round of 16	—	2–2	5–2	1–0
2	(Qatar) Al-Duhail	6	2	3	1	11	9	+2	9		4–3	—	1–1	2–0
3	(Saudi Arabia) Al-Ahli (H)	6	2	3	1	9	8	+1	9		0–0	1–1	—	2–1
4	(Iraq) Al-Shorta	6	1	0	5	3	12	−9	3		0–3	2–1	0–3	—

Source: AFC
(H) Hosts

=== Group D ===
Pos	Team	Pld	W	D	L	GF	GA	GD	Pts	Qualification	NAS	SAD	WEH	FOO
1	(Saudi Arabia) Al-Nassr (H)	6	3	2	1	9	5	+4	11	Advance to Round of 16	—	3–1	1–2	2–0
2	(Qatar) Al-Sadd	6	3	1	2	9	7	+2	10		1–2	—	3–1	1–1
3	(Jordan) Al-Wehdat	6	2	1	3	4	7	−3	7		0–0	0–2	—	1–0
4	(Iran) Foolad	6	1	2	3	3	6	−3	5		1–1	0–1	1–0	—

Source: AFC
(H) Hosts

=== Group E ===
Pos	Team	Pld	W	D	L	GF	GA	GD	Pts	Qualification	PER	WAH	GOA	RAY
1	(Iran) Persepolis	6	5	0	1	14	5	+9	15	Advance to Round of 16	—	1–0	2–1	4–2
2	(United Arab Emirates) Al-Wahda	6	4	1	1	7	3	+4	13	Advance to Round of 16	1–0	—	0–0	3–2
3	(India) Goa (H)	6	0	3	3	2	9	−7	3		0–4	0–2	—	0–0
4	(Qatar) Al-Rayyan	6	0	2	4	6	12	−6	2		1–3	0–1	1–1	—

Source: AFC
(H) Hosts

=== Group F ===
Pos	Team	Pld	W	D	L	GF	GA	GD	Pts	Qualification	ULS	PAT	VIE	KAY
1	(South Korea) Ulsan Hyundai	6	6	0	0	13	1	+12	18	Advance to Round of 16	—	2–0	3–0	2–1
2	(Thailand) BG Pathum United (H)	6	4	0	2	10	6	+4	12	Advance to Round of 16	0–2	—	2–0	4–1
3	(Vietnam) Viettel	6	2	0	4	7	9	−2	6		0–1	1–3	—	1–0
4	(Philippines) Kaya–Iloilo	6	0	0	6	2	16	−14	0		0–3	0–1	0–5	—

Source: AFC
(H) Hosts

=== Group G ===
Pos	Team	Pld	W	D	L	GF	GA	GD	Pts	Qualification	NAG	POH	JOH	RAT
1	(Japan) Nagoya Grampus	6	5	1	0	14	2	+12	16	Advance to Round of 16	—	3–0	2–1	3–0
2	(South Korea) Pohang Steelers	6	3	2	1	9	5	+4	11	Advance to Round of 16	1–1	—	4–1	2–0
3	(Malaysia) Johor Darul Ta'zim	6	1	1	4	3	9	−6	4		0–1	0–2	—	0–0
4	(Thailand) Ratchaburi Mitr Phol (H)	6	0	2	4	0	10	−10	2		0–4	0–0	0–1	—

Source: AFC
(H) Hosts

=== Group H ===
Pos	Team	Pld	W	D	L	GF	GA	GD	Pts	Qualification	JEO	GAM	CHI	TAM
1	(South Korea) Jeonbuk Hyundai Motors	6	5	1	0	22	5	+17	16	Advance to Round of 16	—	2–1	2–1	9–0
2	(Japan) Gamba Osaka	6	2	3	1	15	7	+8	9		2–2	—	1–1	8–1
3	(Thailand) Chiangrai United	6	2	2	2	8	7	+1	8		1–3	1–1	—	1–0
4	(Singapore) Tampines Rovers	6	0	0	6	1	27	−26	0		0–4	0–2	0–3	—

Source: AFC

=== Group I ===
Pos	Team	Pld	W	D	L	GF	GA	GD	Pts	Qualification	KAW	DAE	UNI	BJG
1	(Japan) Kawasaki Frontale	6	6	0	0	27	3	+24	18	Advance to Round of 16	—	3–2	8–0	4–0
2	(South Korea) Daegu FC	6	4	0	2	22	6	+16	12	Advance to Round of 16	1–3	—	7–0	5–0
3	(Philippines) United City	6	1	1	4	4	24	−20	4		0–2	0–4	—	1–1
4	(China) Beijing Guoan	6	0	1	5	3	23	−20	1		0–7	0–3	2–3	—

Source: AFC

=== Group J ===
Pos	Team	Pld	W	D	L	GF	GA	GD	Pts	Qualification	CER	KIT	POR	GZH
1	(Japan) Cerezo Osaka	6	4	2	0	13	2	+11	14	Advance to Round of 16	—	2–1	1–1	5–0
2	(Hong Kong) Kitchee	6	3	2	1	6	3	+3	11		0–0	—	2–0	1–0
3	(Thailand) Port (H)	6	2	2	2	10	8	+2	8		0–3	1–1	—	3–0
4	(China) Guangzhou	6	0	0	6	1	17	−16	0		0–2	0–1	1–5	—

Source: AFC
(H) Hosts

=== Ranking of second-placed teams ===
==== West Region ====
Pos	Grp	Team	Pld	W	D	L	GF	GA	GD	Pts	Qualification
1	E	(United Arab Emirates) Al-Wahda	6	4	1	1	7	3	+4	13	Advance to Round of 16
2	B	(Iran) Tractor	6	2	4	0	6	3	+3	10	Advance to Round of 16
3	A	(Saudi Arabia) Al-Hilal	6	3	1	2	11	9	+2	10	Advance to Round of 16
4	D	(Qatar) Al-Sadd	6	3	1	2	9	7	+2	10	
5	C	(Qatar) Al-Duhail	6	2	3	1	11	9	+2	9	

Source: AFC
Rules for classification: 1) Points; 2) Goal difference; 3) Goals scored; 4) Disciplinary points; 5) Drawing of lots.

==== East Region ====
Pos	Grp	Team	Pld	W	D	L	GF	GA	GD	Pts	Qualification
1	I	(South Korea) Daegu FC	6	4	0	2	22	6	+16	12	Advance to Round of 16
2	F	(Thailand) BG Pathum United	6	4	0	2	10	6	+4	12	Advance to Round of 16
3	G	(South Korea) Pohang Steelers	6	3	2	1	9	5	+4	11	Advance to Round of 16
4	J	(Hong Kong) Kitchee	6	3	2	1	6	3	+3	11	
5	H	(Japan) Gamba Osaka	6	2	3	1	15	7	+8	9	

Source: AFC
Rules for classification: 1) Points; 2) Goal difference; 3) Goals scored; 4) Disciplinary points; 5) Drawing of lots.

== Knockout stage ==
In the knockout stage, the 16 teams played a single-elimination tournament, with the teams split into the two regions until the final. All ties were played as a single-leg match (Regulations Article 9.1). Extra time and penalty shoot-out were used to decide the winners if necessary (Regulations Article 9.3 and 10.1).

=== Bracket ===
Round of 16
14 September – Sharjah
(United Arab Emirates) Sharjah	1 (4)
(United Arab Emirates) Al Wahda (p)	1 (5)
14 September – Al Rayyan (Qatar)
(Saudi Arabia) Al Nassr	1
(Iran) Tractor	0
14 September – Dushanbe
(Tajikistan) Istiklol	0
(Iran) Persepolis	1
13 September – Dubai (UAE)
(Iran) Esteghlal	0
(Saudi Arabia) Al-Hilal	2
15 September – Jeonju
(South Korea) Jeonbuk Hyundai Motors (p)	1 (4)
(Thailand) BG Pathum United	1 (2)
14 September – Ulsan
(South Korea) Ulsan Hyundai (p)	0 (3)
(Japan) Kawasaki Frontale	0 (2)
15 September – Osaka
(Japan) Cerezo Osaka	0
(South Korea) Pohang Steelers	1
14 September – Toyota
(Japan) Nagoya Grampus	4
(South Korea) Daegu FC	2

Quarter-finals
16 October – Riyadh (Mrsool)
(United Arab Emirates) Al Wahda	1
(Saudi Arabia) Al-Nassr	5
16 October – Riyadh (Prince)
(Iran) Persepolis	0
(Saudi Arabia) Al-Hilal	3
17 October – Jeonju
(South Korea) Jeonbuk Hyundai Motors	2
(South Korea) Ulsan Hyundai (a.e.t.)	3
17 October – Jeonju
(South Korea) Pohang Steelers	3
(Japan) Nagoya Grampus	0

Semi-finals
19 October – Riyadh (Mrsool)
(Saudi Arabia) Al-Nassr	1
(Saudi Arabia) Al-Hilal	2
20 October – Jeonju
(South Korea) Ulsan Hyundai	1 (4)
(South Korea) Pohang Steelers (p)	1 (5)

Final
23 November – Riyadh (King)
(Saudi Arabia) Al-Hilal	2
(South Korea) Pohang Steelers	0

=== Round of 16 ===
The round of 16 was played over one leg, with the matchups determined by the combination tables based on which group runners-up qualified.

West Region
Team 1	Score	Team 2
Istiklol (Tajikistan)	0–1	(Iran) Persepolis
Sharjah (United Arab Emirates)	1–1 (a.e.t.) (4–5 p)	(United Arab Emirates) Al-Wahda
Esteghlal (Iran)	0–2	(Saudi Arabia) Al-Hilal
Al-Nassr (Saudi Arabia)	1–0	(Iran) Tractor

East Region
Team 1	Score	Team 2
Ulsan Hyundai (South Korea)	0–0 (a.e.t.) (3–2 p)	(Japan) Kawasaki Frontale
Nagoya Grampus (Japan)	4–2	(South Korea) Daegu FC
Jeonbuk Hyundai Motors (South Korea)	1–1 (a.e.t.) (4–2 p)	(Thailand) BG Pathum United
Cerezo Osaka (Japan)	0–1	(South Korea) Pohang Steelers

=== Quarter-finals ===
The quarter-finals were played over one leg, with the matchups and home team decided by draw held on 17 September at 15:00 (UTC+8) in Kuala Lumpur, Malaysia.

West Region
Team 1	Score	Team 2
Al-Wahda (United Arab Emirates)	1–5	(Saudi Arabia) Al-Nassr
Persepolis (Iran)	0–3	(Saudi Arabia) Al-Hilal

East Region
Team 1	Score	Team 2
Jeonbuk Hyundai Motors (South Korea)	2–3 (a.e.t.)	(South Korea) Ulsan Hyundai
Pohang Steelers (South Korea)	3–0	(Japan) Nagoya Grampus

=== Semi-finals ===
The semi-finals were played over one leg.

West Region
Team 1	Score	Team 2
Al-Nassr (Saudi Arabia)	1–2	(Saudi Arabia) Al-Hilal

East Region
Team 1	Score	Team 2
Ulsan Hyundai (South Korea)	1–1 (a.e.t.) (4–5 p)	(South Korea) Pohang Steelers

=== Final ===
The final was played over a single leg on 23 November. The host was determined on a rotational basis, with the match hosted by team from the West Region in odd-numbered years (Regulations 9.1.2).

23 November 2021
19:00 UTC+3

Al-Hilal (Saudi Arabia)	2–0	(South Korea) Pohang Steelers
N. Al-Dawsari 1'; Marega 63'	Live Report; Stats Report

King Fahd International Stadium, Riyadh
Attendance: 50,171
Referee: Mohammed Abdulla Hassan Mohamed (United Arab Emirates)

== Top scorers ==
Team eliminated for this round.
Player is not in the team but team still active for this round.

Rank	Player	Team	MD1	MD2	MD3	MD4	MD5	MD6	R16	QF	SF	F	Total
1	(Kenya) Michael Olunga	(Qatar) Al-Duhail	1	1	3	2	1	1					9
2	(Brazil) Gustavo	(South Korea) Jeonbuk Hyundai Motors	1		4	1		1	1				8
3	(The Gambia) Modou Barrow	(South Korea) Jeonbuk Hyundai Motors			3	1	1	1					6
3	(Brazil) Edgar	(South Korea) Daegu FC		1	2		1	1	1				6
3	(Brazil) Leandro Damião	(Japan) Kawasaki Frontale	2		1		3						6
3	(France) Bafétimbi Gomis	(Saudi Arabia) Al Hilal		1		1	1		1	2			6
3	(Brazil) Patric	(Japan) Gamba Osaka	1	2			2	1					6
8	(Mali) Cheick Diabaté	(Iran) Esteghlal	1	1	1	1		1					5
8	(Brazil) Cesinha	(South Korea) Daegu FC	1	1	2				1				5
8	(Morocco) Abderazak Hamdallah	(Saudi Arabia) Al-Nassr		1		1	1	1		1			5

Note: Goals scored in the qualifying play-offs and matches voided by AFC are not counted when determining top scorer (Regulations Article 64.4).

== See also ==
- 2021 AFC Cup
- 2021 AFC Women's Club Championship
