= 2021 AFC Champions League knockout stage =

Football tournament knockout stage

The 2021 AFC Champions League knockout stage was played from 13 September to 23 November 2021. A total of 16 teams competed in the knockout stage to decide the champions of the 2021 AFC Champions League.

== Qualified teams ==
The group winners and three best runners-up in the group stage from each region advanced to the round of 16, with both West Region (Groups A–E) and East Region (Groups F–J) having eight qualified teams.

Region	Group	Winners	Runners-up (best three from each region)
West Region	A	(Tajikistan Football Federation) Istiklol	(Saudi Arabian Football Federation) Al-Hilal
West Region	B	(United Arab Emirates Football Association) Sharjah	(Football Federation Islamic Republic of Iran) Tractor
West Region	C	(Football Federation Islamic Republic of Iran) Esteghlal	—
West Region	D	(Saudi Arabian Football Federation) Al-Nassr	—
West Region	E	(Football Federation Islamic Republic of Iran) Persepolis	(United Arab Emirates Football Association) Al-Wahda
East Region	F	(Korea Football Association) Ulsan Hyundai	(Football Association of Thailand) BG Pathum United
East Region	G	(Japan Football Association) Nagoya Grampus	(Korea Football Association) Pohang Steelers
East Region	H	(Korea Football Association) Jeonbuk Hyundai Motors	—
East Region	I	(Japan Football Association) Kawasaki Frontale	(Korea Football Association) Daegu FC
East Region	J	(Japan Football Association) Cerezo Osaka	—

=== Combination table ===
If two group winners played each other, the group winner marked with * hosted the match.

West Region

Combination according to the three qualified teams

One-leg matches (13–14 September 2021)

Qualified	1A vs	1B vs	1C vs	1D vs	1E vs
2A/2B/2C	1B*	1A	2A	2B	2C
2A/2B/2D	1D	2D	2A	1A*	2B
2A/2B/2E	1E	2E	2A	2B	1A*
2A/2C/2D	1C*	2D	1A	2A	2C
2A/2C/2E	2C	2E	1E*	2A	1C
2A/2D/2E	2D	2E	2A	1E*	1D
2B/2C/2D	2D	1C*	1B	2B	2C
2B/2C/2E	2C	1E	2E	2B	1B*
2B/2D/2E	2D	1D*	2E	1B	2B
2C/2D/2E	2D	2E	1D*	1C	2C

East Region

Combinations according to the three qualified teams

One-leg matches (14–15 September 2021)

Qualified	1F vs	1G vs	1H vs	1I vs	1J vs
2F/2G/2H	1G*	1F	2F	2G	2H
2F/2G/2I	1I	2I	2F	1F*	2G
2F/2G/2J	1J	2J	2F	2G	1F*
2F/2H/2I	1H*	2I	1F	2F	2H
2F/2H/2J	2H	2J	1J*	2F	1H
2F/2I/2J	2I	2J	2F	1J*	1I
2G/2H/2I	2I	1H*	1G	2G	2H
2G/2H/2J	2H	1J	2J	2G	1G*
2G/2I/2J	2I	1I*	2J	1G	2G
2H/2I/2J	2I	2J	1I*	1H	2H

== Format ==
In the knockout stage, the 16 teams played a single-elimination tournament, with the teams split into the two regions until the final. All ties were played as a single-leg match (Regulations Article 9.1). Extra time and penalty shoot-out were used to decide the winners if necessary (Regulations Article 9.3 and 10.1).

== Schedule ==
The schedule of each round was as follows.

Round	Date
Round of 16	13–15 September 2021
Quarter-finals	16–17 October 2021
Semi-finals	19–20 October 2021
Final	23 November 2021

== Bracket ==
The bracket of the knockout stage was determined as follows:

Round	Format
Round of 16	Matchups within East region and West region decided by a series of permutations, based upon the three best runner-ups who qualified
Quarter-finals	Matchups decided by a draw: QF West 1; QF West 2; QF East 1; QF East 2
Semi-finals	SF West: Winners of QF West 1 vs. Winners of QF West 2; SF East: Winners of QF East 1 vs. Winners of QF East 2
Final	Winners of SF West vs. Winners of SF East

Round of 16
14 September – Sharjah
(United Arab Emirates) Sharjah	1 (4)
(United Arab Emirates) Al Wahda (p)	1 (5)
14 September – Al Rayyan (Qatar)
(Saudi Arabia) Al Nassr	1
(Iran) Tractor	0
14 September – Dushanbe
(Tajikistan) Istiklol	0
(Iran) Persepolis	1
13 September – Dubai (UAE)
(Iran) Esteghlal	0
(Saudi Arabia) Al-Hilal	2
15 September – Jeonju
(South Korea) Jeonbuk Hyundai Motors (p)	1 (4)
(Thailand) BG Pathum United	1 (2)
14 September – Ulsan
(South Korea) Ulsan Hyundai (p)	0 (3)
(Japan) Kawasaki Frontale	0 (2)
15 September – Osaka
(Japan) Cerezo Osaka	0
(South Korea) Pohang Steelers	1
14 September – Toyota
(Japan) Nagoya Grampus	4
(South Korea) Daegu FC	2

Quarter-finals
16 October – Riyadh (Mrsool)
(United Arab Emirates) Al Wahda	1
(Saudi Arabia) Al-Nassr	5
16 October – Riyadh (Prince)
(Iran) Persepolis	0
(Saudi Arabia) Al-Hilal	3
17 October – Jeonju
(South Korea) Jeonbuk Hyundai Motors	2
(South Korea) Ulsan Hyundai (a.e.t.)	3
17 October – Jeonju
(South Korea) Pohang Steelers	3
(Japan) Nagoya Grampus	0

Semi-finals
19 October – Riyadh (Mrsool)
(Saudi Arabia) Al-Nassr	1
(Saudi Arabia) Al-Hilal	2
20 October – Jeonju
(South Korea) Ulsan Hyundai	1 (4)
(South Korea) Pohang Steelers (p)	1 (5)

Final
23 November – Riyadh (King)
(Saudi Arabia) Al-Hilal	2
(South Korea) Pohang Steelers	0

== Round of 16 ==
=== Summary ===
The round of 16 was played over one leg, with the matchups determined by the combination tables based on which group runners-up qualified.

West Region
Team 1	Score	Team 2
Istiklol (Tajikistan)	0–1	(Iran) Persepolis
Sharjah (United Arab Emirates)	1–1 (a.e.t.) (4–5 p)	(United Arab Emirates) Al-Wahda
Esteghlal (Iran)	0–2	(Saudi Arabia) Al-Hilal
Al-Nassr (Saudi Arabia)	1–0	(Iran) Tractor

East Region
Team 1	Score	Team 2
Ulsan Hyundai (South Korea)	0–0 (a.e.t.) (3–2 p)	(Japan) Kawasaki Frontale
Nagoya Grampus (Japan)	4–2	(South Korea) Daegu FC
Jeonbuk Hyundai Motors (South Korea)	1–1 (a.e.t.) (4–2 p)	(Thailand) BG Pathum United
Cerezo Osaka (Japan)	0–1	(South Korea) Pohang Steelers

=== West Region ===
14 September 2021
20:00 UTC+5

Istiklol (Tajikistan Football Federation)	0–1	(Football Federation Islamic Republic of Iran) Persepolis
	Live Report; Stats Report	Torabi 90'

Pamir Stadium, Dushanbe
Attendance: 17,200
Referee: Hiroyuki Kimura (Japan)

14 September 2021
21:00 UTC+4

Sharjah (United Arab Emirates Football Association)	1–1 (a.e.t.)	(United Arab Emirates Football Association) Al-Wahda
Bernard 58'	Live Report; Stats Report	Kharbin 56'
Penalties
Caio (penalty scored); Bernard (penalty scored); Abdulbasit (penalty scored); Shukurov (penalty scored); Malango (penalty missed); Khamis (penalty missed)	4–5	(penalty missed) José Ángel; (penalty scored) Jumaa; (penalty scored) João Pedro; (penalty scored) Rashed; (penalty scored) Al-Menhali; (penalty scored) Al-Zaabi

Sharjah Stadium, Sharjah
Attendance: 2,100
Referee: Nawaf Shukralla (Bahrain)

13 September 2021
21:00 UTC+4

Esteghlal (Football Federation Islamic Republic of Iran)	0–2	(Saudi Arabian Football Federation) Al-Hilal
	Live Report; Stats Report	Gomis 39'; Al-Dawsari 56'

Zabeel Stadium, Dubai (United Arab Emirates)
Attendance: 0
Referee: Fu Ming (China)

14 September 2021
19:00 UTC+3

Al-Nassr (Saudi Arabian Football Federation)	1–0	(Football Federation Islamic Republic of Iran) Tractor
Aboubakar 11'	Live Report; Stats Report

Khalifa International Stadium, Al Rayyan (Qatar)
Attendance: 0
Referee: Kim Dae-yong (South Korea)

=== East Region ===
14 September 2021
20:00 UTC+9

Ulsan Hyundai (Korea Football Association)	0–0 (a.e.t.)	(Japan Football Association) Kawasaki Frontale
	Live Report; Stats Report
Penalties
Lee Chung-yong (penalty scored); Won Du-jae (penalty missed); Lee Dong-jun (penalty missed); Yun Il-lok (penalty scored); Yoon Bit-garam (penalty scored)	3–2	(penalty scored) Chinen; (penalty missed) Hasegawa; (penalty scored) Tono; (penalty missed) João Schmidt; (penalty missed) Ienaga

Ulsan Munsu Football Stadium, Ulsan
Attendance: 0
Referee: Mohammed Abdulla Hassan Mohamed (United Arab Emirates)

14 September 2021
18:00 UTC+9

Nagoya Grampus (Japan Football Association)	4–2	(Korea Football Association) Daegu FC
Świerczok 12', 63', 65'; Nakatani 79'	Live Report; Stats Report	Cesinha 4'; Edgar 28'

Toyota Stadium, Toyota
Attendance: 5,442
Referee: Adham Makhadmeh (Jordan)

15 September 2021
17:30 UTC+9

Jeonbuk Hyundai Motors (Korea Football Association)	1–1 (a.e.t.)	(Football Association of Thailand) BG Pathum United
Gustavo 45+2'	Live Report; Stats Report	Teerasil 76'
Penalties
Gustavo (penalty scored); Kim Bo-kyung (penalty scored); Iljutcenko (penalty scored); Kim Jin-su (penalty scored)	4–2	(penalty scored) Jakkapan; (penalty scored) Chatmongkol; (penalty missed) Sarach; (penalty missed) Chitchanok

Jeonju World Cup Stadium, Jeonju
Attendance: 0
Referee: Mooud Bonyadifard (Iran)

15 September 2021
18:00 UTC+9

Cerezo Osaka (Japan Football Association)	0–1	(Korea Football Association) Pohang Steelers
	Live Report; Stats Report	Lee Seung-mo 25'

Yodoko Sakura Stadium, Osaka
Attendance: 3,156
Referee: Abdulrahman Al-Jassim (Qatar)

== Quarter-finals ==
=== Summary ===
The quarter-finals were played over one leg, with the matchups and home team decided by draw held on 17 September at 15:00 (UTC+8) in Kuala Lumpur, Malaysia.

West Region
Team 1	Score	Team 2
Al-Wahda (United Arab Emirates)	1–5	(Saudi Arabia) Al-Nassr
Persepolis (Iran)	0–3	(Saudi Arabia) Al-Hilal

East Region
Team 1	Score	Team 2
Jeonbuk Hyundai Motors (South Korea)	2–3 (a.e.t.)	(South Korea) Ulsan Hyundai
Pohang Steelers (South Korea)	3–0	(Japan) Nagoya Grampus

=== West Region ===
16 October 2021
18:00 UTC+3

Al-Wahda (United Arab Emirates Football Association)	1–5	(Saudi Arabian Football Federation) Al-Nassr
Matar 90+3'	Live Report; Stats Report	Hamdallah 7'; Masharipov 52', 65'; Asiri 56'; Al-Najei 75'

King Saud University Stadium, Riyadh
Attendance: 20,477
Referee: Ma Ning (China)

16 October 2021
21:00 UTC+3

Persepolis (Football Federation Islamic Republic of Iran)	0–3	(Saudi Arabian Football Federation) Al-Hilal
	Live Report; Stats Report	Al-Dawsari 27'; Gomis 50', 70'

Prince Faisal bin Fahd Stadium, Riyadh
Attendance: 14,877
Referee: Ryuji Sato (Japan)

=== East Region ===
17 October 2021
19:00 UTC+9

Jeonbuk Hyundai Motors (Korea Football Association)	2–3 (a.e.t.)	(Korea Football Association) Ulsan Hyundai
Han Kyo-won 39'; Kunimoto 48'	Live Report; Stats Report	Qazaishvili 13'; Yun Il-lok 45+1'; Lee Dong-gyeong 101'

Jeonju World Cup Stadium, Jeonju
Attendance: 6,869
Referee: Mohammed Abdulla Hassan Mohamed (United Arab Emirates)

17 October 2021
14:00 UTC+9

Pohang Steelers (Korea Football Association)	3–0	(Japan Football Association) Nagoya Grampus
Lim Sang-hyub 53', 90+5'; Lee Seung-mo 70'	Live Report; Stats Report

Jeonju World Cup Stadium, Jeonju
Attendance: 989
Referee: Alireza Faghani (Iran)

== Semi-finals ==
=== Summary ===
The semi-finals were played over one leg.

West Region
Team 1	Score	Team 2
Al-Nassr (Saudi Arabia)	1–2	(Saudi Arabia) Al-Hilal

East Region
Team 1	Score	Team 2
Ulsan Hyundai (South Korea)	1–1 (a.e.t.) (4–5 p)	(South Korea) Pohang Steelers

=== West Region ===
19 October 2021
21:00 UTC+3

Al-Nassr (Saudi Arabian Football Federation)	1–2	(Saudi Arabian Football Federation) Al-Hilal
Talisca 50'	Live Report; Stats Report	Marega 17'; Al-Dawsari 71'

King Saud University Stadium, Riyadh
Attendance: 23,985
Referee: Chris Beath (Australia)

=== East Region ===
20 October 2021
19:00 UTC+9

Ulsan Hyundai (South Korea)	1–1 (a.e.t.)	(South Korea) Pohang Steelers
Yun Il-lok 52'	Live Report; Stats Report	Grant 89'
Penalties
Bulthuis (penalty missed); Lee Chung-yong (penalty scored); Kim Ji-hyeon (penalty scored); Kim Kee-hee (penalty scored); Park Yong-woo (penalty scored)	4–5	(penalty scored) Lim Sang-hyub; (penalty scored) Gwon Wan-gyu; (penalty scored) Kim Seong-ju; (penalty scored) Jeon Min-gwang; (penalty scored) Kang Sang-woo

Jeonju World Cup Stadium, Jeonju
Attendance: 1,370
Referee: Abdulrahman Al-Jassim (Qatar)

== Final ==
The final was played over a single leg on 23 November. The host was determined on a rotational basis, with the match hosted by team from the West Region in odd-numbered years (Regulations 9.1.2).

23 November 2021
19:00 UTC+3

Al-Hilal (Saudi Arabia)	2–0	(South Korea) Pohang Steelers
N. Al-Dawsari 1'; Marega 63'	Live Report; Stats Report

King Fahd International Stadium, Riyadh
Attendance: 50,171
Referee: Mohammed Abdulla Hassan Mohamed (United Arab Emirates)
