= 2021 AFC Champions League qualifying play-offs =

Football tournament qualification stage

The 2021 AFC Champions League qualifying play-offs were played from 7 April to 23 June 2021. A total of 15 teams competed in the qualifying play-offs to decide seven of the 40 places in the group stage of the 2021 AFC Champions League.

== Teams ==
The following 15 teams, split into two regions (West Region and East Region), entered the qualifying play-offs, consisting of two rounds:

- 2 teams entered in the preliminary round.
- 13 teams entered in the play-off round.

Region	Teams entering in play-off round	Teams entering in preliminary round
West Region	(Qatar) Al-Gharafa; (Saudi Arabia) Al-Wehda; (Iran) Foolad; (United Arab Emirates) Al-Wahda; (United Arab Emirates) Al-Ain; (Iraq) Al-Zawraa; (Iraq) Al-Quwa Al-Jawiya; (Uzbekistan) AGMK	
East Region	(China) Shanghai Port (~~Beijing Guoan~~) (Note: On 8 February 2021, the AFC announced that Shandong Taishan, who were originally entered as China 2, had not satisfied the mandatory Criterion F.04 of the AFC Club Licensing Regulations (Edition 2016) concerning overdue payments. Thus, their license was withdrawn by the Asian Football Confederation’s (AFC) independent Entry Control Body and the club were disqualified: Beijing Guoan were reallocated from China 4 to China 3 (moving from play-off round to group position I2), and Shanghai Port were entered as China 4 (play-off round).); (Japan) ~~Cerezo Osaka~~ (Note: Australian teams Sydney FC, Melbourne City, and Brisbane Roar withdrew from the competition after the draw. Chiangrai United, Daegu FC, and Cerezo Osaka entered the group stage instead of the qualifying play-offs and Kaya–Iloilo entered the qualifying play-offs instead of the preliminary round.); (South Korea) ~~Pohang Steelers~~ (Note: Pohang Steelers and Ratchaburi Mitr Phol entered the group stage instead of the qualifying play-offs after Jiangsu withdrew from the AFC Champions League and folded.); (South Korea) ~~Daegu FC~~; (Thailand) ~~Chiangrai United~~; (Thailand) ~~Ratchaburi Mitr Phol~~; (Australia) ~~Melbourne City~~ (Note: Shan United withdrew from the AFC Champions League following the state of emergency in Myanmar and Melbourne City would enter the play-off round instead of the preliminary round. Later, Melbourne City FC also withdrew, along the other Australian teams: their opponent Cerezo Osaka entered the group stage.); (Philippines) Kaya–Iloilo	(Australia) ~~Melbourne City~~; (Australia) ~~Brisbane Roar~~; (Philippines) ~~Kaya–Iloilo~~; (Myanmar) ~~Shan United~~

== Format ==
In the qualifying play-offs, each tie was played as a single match. Extra time and penalty shoot-out were used to decide the winner if necessary.

== Schedule ==
The schedule of each round was as follows. On 11 March 2021, the AFC announced that the preliminary round and play-off round matches in the East Region, which were originally scheduled to be played on 7 April and 14 April 2021, had been postponed to June/July 2021, and were played in centralised venues of their respective group stage matches.

Round	West Region	East Region
Preliminary round	Not played	
Play-off round	7 and 10 April 2021	23 June 2021

== Bracket ==
The bracket of the qualifying play-offs for each region was determined based on each team's association ranking and their seeding within their association, with the team from the higher-ranked association hosting the match in the West Region. Teams from the same association could not be placed into the same tie. The eight winners of the play-off round (four each from both West Region and East Region) advanced to the group stage to join the 32 direct entrants.

=== Play-off West 1 ===
- (Uzbekistan) AGMK advanced to Group A.

Preliminary round	Play-off round
	(Qatar) Al-Gharafa	0
	(Uzbekistan) AGMK (a.e.t.)	1

=== Play-off West 2 ===
- (Iraq) Al-Quwa Al-Jawiya advanced to Group B.

Preliminary round	Play-off round
	(Saudi Arabia) Al-Wehda	1 (2)
	(Iraq) Al-Quwa Al-Jawiya (p)	1 (3)

=== Play-off West 3 ===
- (Iran) Foolad advanced to Group D.

Preliminary round	Play-off round
	(Iran) Foolad	4
	(United Arab Emirates) Al-Ain	0

=== Play-off West 4 ===
- (United Arab Emirates) Al-Wahda advanced to Group E.

Preliminary round	Play-off round
	(United Arab Emirates) Al-Wahda	2
	(Iraq) Al-Zawraa	1

=== Play-off East 1 ===
- (Philippines) Kaya–Iloilo advanced to Group F.

Preliminary round		Play-off round
		(China) Shanghai Port	0
(Australia) Brisbane Roar (w/o)	—	(Philippines) Kaya–Iloilo	1
(Philippines) Kaya–Iloilo	—

=== Play-off East 2 ===
- (Japan) Cerezo Osaka advanced to Group J after Shan United and Melbourne City both withdrew from the competition.

Preliminary round		Play-off round
		(Japan) Cerezo Osaka (w/o)	—
(Australia) Melbourne City (w/o)	—	(Australia) Melbourne City	—
(Myanmar) Shan United	—

=== Play-off East 3 ===
- (South Korea) Pohang Steelers and (Thailand) Ratchaburi Mitr Phol advanced to Group G after Jiangsu withdrew from the competition and folded.

Preliminary round	Play-off round
	(South Korea) Pohang Steelers	—
	(Thailand) Ratchaburi Mitr Phol	—

=== Play-off East 4 ===
- (South Korea) Daegu FC advanced to Group I, and (Thailand) Chiangrai United advanced to Group H.

Preliminary round	Play-off round
	(South Korea) Daegu FC	—
	(Thailand) Chiangrai United	—

== Preliminary round ==
=== Summary ===
A total of two teams will play in the preliminary round.

East Region
Team 1	Score	Team 2
Brisbane Roar (Australia)	Cancelled	(Philippines) Kaya–Iloilo
Melbourne City (Australia)	Cancelled	(Myanmar) Shan United

=== East Region ===
Brisbane Roar (Australia)	Cancelled	(Philippines) Kaya–Iloilo
	Stats Report

Melbourne City (Australia)	Cancelled	(Myanmar) Shan United
	Stats Report

== Play-off round ==
=== Summary ===
A total of 14 teams played in the preliminary round 2: 13 teams which entered in this round, and one winner of the preliminary round.

West Region
Team 1	Score	Team 2
Al-Gharafa (Qatar)	0–1 (a.e.t.)	(Uzbekistan) AGMK
Al-Wehda (Saudi Arabia)	1–1 (a.e.t.) (2–3 p)	(Iraq) Al-Quwa Al-Jawiya
Foolad (Iran)	4–0	(United Arab Emirates) Al-Ain
Al-Wahda (United Arab Emirates)	2–1	(Iraq) Al-Zawraa

East Region
Team 1	Score	Team 2
Shanghai Port (China)	0–1	(Philippines) Kaya–Iloilo
Cerezo Osaka (Japan)	Cancelled	(Australia) Melbourne City
Pohang Steelers (South Korea)	Cancelled	(Thailand) Ratchaburi Mitr Phol
Daegu FC (South Korea)	Cancelled	(Thailand) Chiangrai United

=== West Region ===
7 April 2021
18:20 UTC+3

Al-Gharafa (Qatar)	0–1 (a.e.t.)	(Uzbekistan) AGMK
	Live Report; Stats Report	Đokić 120'

Suheim bin Hamad Stadium, Doha
Attendance: 0
Referee: Ali Sabah (Iraq)

7 April 2021
20:45 UTC+3

Al-Wehda (Saudi Arabia)	1–1 (a.e.t.)	(Iraq) Al-Quwa Al-Jawiya
Niakaté 24'	Live Report; Stats Report	Hussein 90+2'
Penalties
Niakaté (penalty scored); Al-Qarni (penalty missed); A. Al-Qahtani (penalty missed); M. Al-Qahtani (penalty scored); Al-Ghamdi (penalty missed)	2–3	(penalty missed) M. Jabbar; (penalty scored) Radhi; (penalty scored) H. Jabbar; (penalty scored) El Ani

King Abdul Aziz Stadium, Mecca
Attendance: 50
Referee: Omar Al-Yaqoubi (Oman)

10 April 2021 (Note: The play-off round match between Foolad and Al-Ain was originally scheduled to be held on 7 April 2021, 19:00 UTC+4:30, at Foolad Arena, Ahvaz, but was rescheduled to 10 April 2021, 18:50 UTC+3, at Prince Faisal bin Fahd Stadium, Riyadh (Saudi Arabia), after the Asian Football Confederation announced that teams from Iran would not be allowed to host their home matches in their country.)
18:50 UTC+3

Foolad (Iran)	4–0	(United Arab Emirates) Al-Ain
Sal. Hardani 41'; Chimba 48', 87'; Patosi 55'	Live Report; Stats Report

Prince Faisal bin Fahd Stadium, Riyadh (Saudi Arabia)
Attendance: 0
Referee: Hettikamkanamge Perera (Sri Lanka)

7 April 2021
19:40 UTC+4

Al-Wahda (United Arab Emirates)	2–1	(Iraq) Al-Zawraa
Khribin 62'; Ibrahim 77'	Live Report; Stats Report	Abdul-Zahra 46'

Al Nahyan Stadium, Abu Dhabi
Attendance: 0
Referee: Nawaf Shukralla (Bahrain)

=== East Region ===
23 June 2021
21:00 UTC+7

Shanghai Port (China)	0–1	(Philippines) Kaya–Iloilo
	Live Report; Stats Report	Menzi 17'

Pathum Thani Stadium, Pathum Thani (Thailand)
Attendance: 0
Referee: Shaun Evans (Australia)

Cerezo Osaka (Japan)	Cancelled	(Australia) Melbourne City
	Stats Report

Pohang Steelers (South Korea)	Cancelled	(Thailand) Ratchaburi Mitr Phol
	Stats Report

Daegu FC (South Korea)	Cancelled	(Thailand) Chiangrai United
	Stats Report
