= Mohammed Abdulla Hassan Mohamed =

Emirati football referee

Mohammed Abdulla
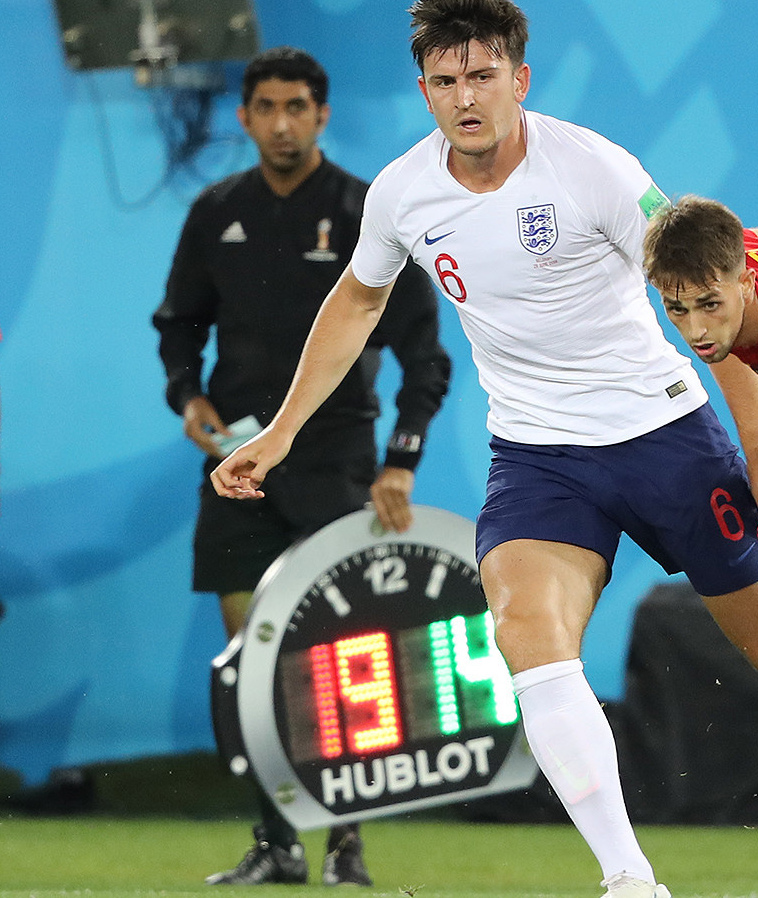
- Full name: Mohammed Abdulla Hassan Mohamed
- Born: 2 December 1978 (age 47); Dubai, United Arab Emirates

International
Years	League	Role
2010–2024	FIFA	Referee

Mohammed Abdulla Hassan Mohamed (Arabic: محمد عبد الله حسن محمد; born 2 December 1978) is an Emirati football referee who has been a full international referee for FIFA since 2010.

Mohammed Abdulla Mohammed started out as a footballer, but switched to refereeing after watching a compatriot officiate at the World Cup. That person was Ali Bujsaim, who took charge of seven matches spanning three editions of the tournament (in 1994, 1998, and 2002).

He was one of the referees of the 2015 AFC Asian Cup.

In June 2022, he officiated the CONCACAF–OFC Intercontinental playoff match between Costa Rica and New Zealand for the 2022 FIFA World Cup.

He was called up to be one of the referees at the 2023 AFC Asian Cup.

Preceded by (South Korea) Kim Jong-hyeok	AFC Cup final match referees 2017 (United Arab Emirates) Mohammed Abdulla Hassan Mohamed	Succeeded by (Qatar) Abdulrahman Al-Jassim
