= 2019 Urawa Red Diamonds season =

Urawa Red Diamonds
2019 season
- Chairman: Keizo Fuchita
- Manager: Oswaldo de Oliveira
- Stadium: Saitama Stadium 2002
- J1 League: 14th
- Emperor's Cup: Fourth round
- J.League Cup: Quarter-finals
- Japanese Super Cup: Runners-up
- AFC Champions League: Runners-up
- Top goalscorer: League: Shinzo Koroki (12); All: Shinzo Koroki (21)
- Average home league attendance: 34,184
Home colours	Away colours

The 2019 season was Urawa Red Diamonds's 19th consecutive season in J1 League, after finishing 5th in the 2018 J1 League. The club also competed in the Emperor's Cup, J.League Cup, Japanese Super Cup and AFC Champions League. They reached the final of the latter competition, losing to Al Hilal of Saudi Arabia by a 0–3 aggregate score.

== Squad ==
As of 16 January 2019. Note: Flags indicate national team as defined under FIFA eligibility rules; some limited exceptions apply. Players may hold more than one non-FIFA nationality.

No.	Pos.	Nation	Player
1	GK	JPN	Shusaku Nishikawa
2	DF	BRA	Maurício Antônio
3	MF	JPN	Tomoya Ugajin
4	DF	JPN	Daisuke Suzuki
5	DF	JPN	Tomoaki Makino (Vice-captain)
6	DF	JPN	Ryosuke Yamanaka
7	MF	JPN	Kazuki Nagasawa
8	MF	BRA	Ewerton (on loan from Porto)
9	FW	JPN	Yuki Muto
10	MF	JPN	Yōsuke Kashiwagi (Captain)
11	FW	CUW	Quenten Martinus
12	FW	BRA	Fabrício
14	FW	JPN	Kenyu Sugimoto
16	MF	JPN	Takuya Aoki
17	DF	JPN	Rikiya Motegi
18	MF	JPN	Naoki Yamada

No.	Pos.	Nation	Player
19	FW	AUS	Andrew Nabbout
22	MF	JPN	Yuki Abe
23	GK	JPN	Nao Iwadate
24	MF	JPN	Koya Yuruki
25	GK	JPN	Haruki Fukushima
26	DF	JPN	Takuya Ogiwara
27	DF	JPN	Daiki Hashioka
28	DF	JPN	Katsuya Iwatake
29	MF	JPN	Kai Shibato
30	FW	JPN	Shinzo Koroki
31	DF	JPN	Takuya Iwanami
32	GK	JPN	Ryo Ishii
33	DF	JPN	Nobuki Iketaka
34	DF	JPN	Kei Oshiro
46	DF	JPN	Ryota Moriwaki

== Competitions ==
=== Super Cup ===
16 February 2019	Kawasaki Frontale	1 – 0	Urawa Red Diamonds	Saitama Stadium 2002
13:35	Leandro Damião (yellow card) 27' (goal) 52'; Taniguchi (yellow card) 67'	Report	Makino (yellow card) 33'	Attendance: 52,587; Referee: Masaaki Iemoto Toma

=== J1 League ===
==== League table ====
Pos	Team	Pld	W	D	L	GF	GA	GD	Pts	Qualification or relegation
12	Shimizu S-Pulse	34	11	6	17	45	69	−24	39	
13	Nagoya Grampus	34	9	10	15	45	50	−5	37	
14	Urawa Red Diamonds	34	9	10	15	34	50	−16	37	
15	Sagan Tosu	34	10	6	18	32	53	−21	36	
16	Shonan Bellmare (O)	34	10	6	18	40	63	−23	36	Qualification for the Relegation play-off

Source: Meiji Yasuda J1 League
Rules for classification: 1) Points; 2) Goal difference; 3) Goals scored.
(O) Play-off winners

==== Results ====
23 February 2019 1	Vegalta Sendai	0 – 0	Urawa Red Diamonds	Yurtec Stadium Sendai
14:04 JST	Hiraoka (yellow card) 57'; Hyodo (yellow card) 60'	Report	Ugajin (yellow card) 43'; Iwanami (yellow card) 89'	Attendance: 18,567; Referee: Ryuji Sato

2 March 2019 2	Urawa Red Diamonds	0 – 2	Hokkaido Consadole Sapporo	Saitama Stadium 2002
16:04 JST	Iwanami (yellow card) 80'; Martinus (yellow card) 85'	Report	Suzuki 2', 27'; Anderson Lopes (yellow card) 36'; Shindo (yellow card) 88'	Attendance: 41,109; Referee: Yoshiro Imamura

9 March 2019 3	Matsumoto Yamaga	0 – 1	Urawa Red Diamonds	Naganoken Matsumotodaira Wide Area Park General Stadium
16:04 JST	Paulinho (yellow card) 68'	Report	Koroki 72' (pen.); Abe (yellow card) 82'	Attendance: 18,922; Referee: Yuichi Nishimura

17 March 2019 4	Cerezo Osaka	1–2	Urawa Red Diamonds	Yanmar Stadium Nagai
15:00	Souza 64'	Report	Moriwaki (yellow card) 63'; Koroki 76'; Sugimoto 82' (pen.); Hashioka (yellow card) 90+3'	Attendance: 21,022; Referee: Yudai Yamamoto

30 March 2019 5	Urawa Red Diamonds	1–1	FC Tokyo	Saitama
14:00	Moriwaki 90+4'	Summary	Takahagi (yellow card) 69'; Diego Oliveira 75' (yellow card) 76'	Stadium: Saitama Stadium 2002; Attendance: 39,055; Referee: Hiroyuki Kimura

5 April 2019 6	Urawa Red Diamonds	0–3	Yokohama F. Marinos	Saitama
20:30		Summary	Marcos Júnior 7' 61'; Hirose 70'	Stadium: Saitama Stadium 2002; Attendance: 32,555; Referee: Masaaki Iemoto

14 April 2019 7	Gamba Osaka	0–1	Urawa Red Diamonds	Suita
17:00	Higashiguchi (yellow card) 21'; Kurata (yellow card) 60'	Summary	Kashiwagi (yellow card) 21'; Ewerton 87'	Stadium: Panasonic Stadium Suita; Attendance: 27,870; Referee: Jumpei Iida

20 April 2019 8	Urawa Red Diamonds	1–0	Vissel Kobe	Saitama
14:00	Koroki 9' (pen.); Yamanaka (yellow card) 87'	Summary	Dankler (yellow card) 10'; Sergi Samper (yellow card) 17'	Stadium: Saitama Stadium 2002; Attendance: 54,599; Referee: Ryuji Sato

28 April 2019 9	Shimizu S-Pulse	0–2	Urawa Red Diamonds	Shizuoka
17:00		Report	Maurício 72'; Koroki 90+7'	Stadium: IAI Stadium Nihondaira; Attendance: 18,246; Referee: Yuichi Nishimura

3 May 2019 10	Urawa Red Diamonds	0–1	Júbilo Iwata	Saitama
14:00 JST		Report	Rodrigues 90+2'	Stadium: Saitama Stadium 2002; Attendance: 53,361; Referee: Hajime Matsuo

12 May 2019 11	Nagoya Grampus	2–0	Urawa Red Diamonds	Toyota
13:00 JST	Mateus 16'; Jô 41'	Report	Kashiwagi (yellow card) 47'; Muto (yellow card) 59'; Ogiwara (yellow card) 89'	Stadium: Toyota Stadium; Attendance: 30,839; Referee: Hiroyuki Kimura

17 May 2019 12	Urawa Red Diamonds	2–3	Shonan Bellmare	Saitama
19:30 JST	Nagasawa 22'; Nabbout 25'; Fabrício (yellow card) 73'	Report	Sugioka (yellow card) 41'; Kikuchi 47' 79'; Yamane (yellow card) 53' (goal) 90+4'; Yamasaki (yellow card) 67'; Leandro Freire (yellow card) 72'	Stadium: Saitama Stadium 2002; Attendance: 23,221; Referee: Yudai Yamamoto

26 May 2019 13	Urawa Red Diamonds	0–4	Sanfrecce Hiroshima	Saitama
14:00 JST	Ugajin (yellow card) 47'; Yamanaka (yellow card) 73'; Fabrício (yellow card) 75'; Ewerton (yellow card) 89'	Report	Morishima 6'; Douglas Vieira 25'; Rhayner 63'; Watari 80'	Stadium: Saitama Stadium 2002; Attendance: 33,235; Referee: Koichiro Fukushima

1 June 2019 14	Kawasaki Frontale	1 – 1	Urawa Red Diamonds	Kawasaki
19:00 JST	Leandro Damião 54'; Maguinho (yellow card) 81'	Report	Ugajin (yellow card) 71'; Moriwaki 90+5'	Stadium: Kawasaki Todoroki Stadium; Attendance: 24,578; Referee: (Japan) Yusuke Araki

15 June 2019 15	Urawa Red Diamonds	2 – 1	Sagan Tosu	Saitama
19:00 JST	Ugajin 31'; Maurício Antônio (yellow card) 51'; Shibato (yellow card) 75'; Martinus (yellow card) 86'; Koroki 90+3'	Report	An Yong-woo 18' (yellow card) 65'	Stadium: Saitama Stadium 2002; Attendance: 28,081; Referee: (Japan) Koei Koya

30 June 2019 16	Oita Trinita	2 – 0	Urawa Red Diamonds	Ōita
19:00 JST	Maeda (yellow card) 13'; Fujimoto 51'; Kobayashi 73'; Hasegawa (yellow card) 88'	Report	Hashioka (yellow card) 67'; Maurício Antônio (yellow card) 90'	Stadium: Showa Denko Dome Oita; Attendance: 14,519; Referee: (Japan) Ryuji Sato

6 July 2019 17	Urawa Red Diamonds	1 – 0	Vegalta Sendai	Saitama
19:00 JST	Koroki 42'	Report	Shiihashi (yellow card) 45' (yellow-red card) 51'; Oiwa (yellow card) 49'; Simão Mate (yellow card) 77'	Stadium: Saitama Stadium 2002; Attendance: 28,904; Referee: (Japan) Jumpei Iida

13 July 2019 18	Yokohama F. Marinos	3 – 1	Urawa Red Diamonds	Yokohama
19:00 JST	Endo 38'; Nakagawa 59'; Edigar Junio 86' (pen.)	Report	Ugajin (yellow card) 28'; Hirose 69' (o.g.); Martinus (yellow card) 90+8'	Stadium: Nissan Stadium; Attendance: 33,673; Referee: (Japan) Hajime Matsuo

20 July 2019 19	Júbilo Iwata	1 – 3	Urawa Red Diamonds	Fukuroi
19:00 JST	Uehara 69'	Report	Koroki 10'; Hashioka 22'; Nagasawa 32'; Shibato (yellow card) 76' (yellow-red card) 85'	Stadium: Shizuoka Stadium; Attendance: 23,060; Referee: (Japan) Koichiro Fukushima

31 July 2019 20	Urawa Red Diamonds	1 – 1	Kashima Antlers	Saitama
19:30 JST	koroki 88'	Report	Ito 77'	Stadium: Saitama Stadium 2002; Attendance: 37,265; Referee: (Japan) Yuichi Nishimura

4 August 2019 21	Urawa Red Diamonds	2 – 2	Nagoya Grampus	Saitama
19:00 JST	Koroki 45+2'; Sekine 90+3'	Report	Izumi 2'; Maeda 25'	Stadium: Saitama Stadium 2002; Attendance: 37,238; Referee: (Japan) Massaki Iemoto

10 August 2019 22	Hokkaido Consadole Sapporo	v	Urawa Red Diamonds	Sapporo
14:00 JST				Stadium: Sapporo Dome

=== J. League Cup ===
Match	Date	Team	Score	Team	Venue	Attendance
QF1	2019.09.04	Urawa Reds	2-3	Kashima Antlers	Saitama Stadium 2002	21,148
QF2	2019.09.08	Kashima Antlers	2-2	Urawa Reds	Kashima Soccer Stadium	14,887

=== Emperor's Cup ===
Match	Date	Team	Score	Team	Venue	Attendance
2R	2019.07.03	Urawa Reds	2-1	Ryutsu Keizai University FC	Urawa Komaba Stadium	6,691
3R	2019.08.14	Mito HollyHock	1-2	Urawa Reds	K's denki Stadium Mito	8,537
4R	2019.09.25	Urawa Reds	0-2	Honda FC	Saitama Stadium 2002	11,953

=== AFC Champions League ===
==== Group standings ====
Pos	Team	Pld	W	D	L	GF	GA	GD	Pts	Qualification	JEO	URA	BJG	BUR
1	(South Korea) Jeonbuk Hyundai Motors	6	4	1	1	7	3	+4	13	Advance to knockout stage	—	2–1	3–1	0–0
2	(Japan) Urawa Red Diamonds	6	3	1	2	9	4	+5	10	Advance to knockout stage	0–1	—	3–0	3–0
3	(China) Beijing FC	6	2	1	3	6	8	−2	7		0–1	0–0	—	2–0
4	(Thailand) Buriram United	6	1	1	4	3	10	−7	4		1–0	1–2	1–3	—

Source: AFC
Rules for classification: Group stage tiebreakers

==== Results ====
6 March 2019 Group G	Urawa Red Diamonds (Japan)	3–0	(Thailand) Buriram United	Saitama Stadium 2002, Saitama
19:30 UTC+9	Makino 50'; Hashioka 75', 88'	Live Report; Stats Report		Attendance: 20,056; Referee: Yaqoob Abdul Baki (Oman)

13 March 2019 Group G	Beijing FC (China)	0–0	(Japan) Urawa Red Diamonds	Workers' Stadium, Beijing
20:00 UTC+8		Live Report; Stats Report		Attendance: 43,112; Referee: Masoud Tufayelieh (Syria)

9 April 2019 Group G	Urawa Red Diamonds (Japan)	0–1	(South Korea) Jeonbuk Hyundai Motors	Saitama Stadium 2002, Saitama
19:30 UTC+9	Ewerton (yellow card) 74'	Live Report; Stats Report	Adriano 77'	Attendance: 20,118; Referee: Peter Green (Australia)

24 April 2019 Group G	Jeonbuk Hyundai Motors (South Korea)	2–1	(Japan) Urawa Red Diamonds	Jeonju World Cup Stadium, Jeonju
19:00 UTC+9	Ricardo Lopes 12'; Kim Shin-wook 48'; Son Jun-ho (yellow card) 50'; Shin Hyung-min (yellow card) 63'	Live Report; Stats Report	Koroki 58'	Attendance: 8,096; Referee: Mohammed Abdulla Hassan Mohamed (United Arab Emirates)

7 May 2019 Group G	Buriram United (Thailand)	1–2	(Japan) Urawa Red Diamonds	Chang Arena, Buriram
18:00 UTC+7	Pedro Júnior 13' (yellow card) 16'	Live Report; Stats Report	Koroki 3'; Muto 23'; Nagasawa (yellow card) 42'; Nishikawa (yellow card) 90+3'	Attendance: 10,970; Referee: Ilgiz Tantashev (Uzbekistan)

21 May 2019 Group G	Urawa Red Diamonds (Japan)	3–0	(China) Beijing FC	Saitama Stadium 2002, Saitama
19:00 UTC+9	Nagasawa 34' (yellow card) 74'; Muto 41'; Makino (yellow card) 78'; Koroki 81'	Live Report; Stats Report	Liu Huan (yellow card) 66'	Attendance: 22,885; Referee: (Iraq) Ali Sabah

==== Round of 16 ====
19 June 2019 Round of 16 First Leg	Urawa Red Diamonds (Japan)	1 – 2	(South Korea) Ulsan Hyundai	Saitama Stadium 2002, Saitama
19:30	Sugimoto 37'; Moriwaki (yellow card) 69'	Report	Joo Min-kyu 42'; Hwang Il-su 80'; Park Yong-woo (yellow card) 83'	Attendance: 20,741; Referee: (Saudi Arabia) Turki Al Khudair

26 June 2019 Round of 16 Second Leg	(South Korea) Ulsan Hyundai	0 – 3 (2 – 4 agg.)	Urawa Red Diamonds (Japan)	Ulsan
19:00	Park Yong-woo (yellow card) 66'; Bulthuis (yellow card) 82'	Report	Fabrício (yellow card) 3'; Koroki 41' 80'; Maurício Antônio (yellow card) 70'; Ewerton (yellow card) 70'	Stadium: Ulsan Munsu Football Stadium; Attendance: 3,140; Referee: (Qatar) Khamis Mohamed Al Kuwari

==== Quarter-finals ====
27 August 2019	Shanghai SIPG (China)	2–2	(Japan) Urawa Red Diamonds	Shanghai Stadium, Shanghai
19:30 UTC+8	Hulk 49' (pen.), 71' (pen.)	Live Report; Stats Report	Makino 3'; Koroki 30'	Attendance: 24,573; Referee: Mohammed Abdulla Hassan Mohamed (United Arab Emirates)

17 September 2019	Urawa Red Diamonds (Japan)	1–1	(China) Shanghai SIPG	Saitama Stadium 2002, Saitama
19:30 UTC+9	Koroki 39'	Live Report; Stats Report	Wang Shenchao 60'	Attendance: 28,533; Referee: Mohanad Qassim (Iraq)

3–3 on aggregate. Urawa Red Diamonds won on away goals.

==== Semi-finals ====
2 October 2019	Urawa Red Diamonds (Japan)	2–0	(China) Guangzhou Evergrande	Saitama Stadium 2002, Saitama
19:30 UTC+9	Fabrício 19'; Sekine 75'	Live Report; Stats Report		Attendance: 30,068; Referee: Chris Beath (Australia)

23 October 2019	Guangzhou Evergrande (China)	0–1	(Japan) Urawa Red Diamonds	Tianhe Stadium, Guangzhou
20:00 UTC+8		Live Report; Stats Report	Koroki 50'	Attendance: 39,999; Referee: Alireza Faghani (Iran)

Urawa Red Diamonds won 3–0 on aggregate.

==== Final ====
9 November 2019 First leg	Al-Hilal (Saudi Arabia)	1–0	(Japan) Urawa Red Diamonds	Riyadh, Saudi Arabia
19:30 UTC+3	Al-Bulaihi (yellow card) 38'; Carrillo 60'	Live Report; Stats Report		Stadium: King Saud University Stadium; Attendance: 22,549; Referee: Ali Sabah (Iraq)

24 November 2019 Second leg	Urawa Red Diamonds (Japan)	0–2	(Saudi Arabia) Al-Hilal	Saitama, Japan
19:00 UTC+9	Sekine (yellow card) 43'; Aoki (yellow card) 53'; Iwanami (yellow card) 57'; Makino (yellow card) 76'	Live Report; Stats Report	Al-Dawsari 74'; Gomis 90+3'	Stadium: Saitama Stadium 2002; Attendance: 58,109; Referee: Valentin Kovalenko (Uzbekistan)
