= 2019 AFC Champions League final =

- Event: 2019 AFC Champions League
Al-Hilal	Urawa Red Diamonds
(Saudi Arabia)	(Japan)
3	0
- on aggregate

First leg
Al-Hilal	Urawa Red Diamonds
1	0
- Date: 9 November 2019
- Venue: King Saud University Stadium, Riyadh
- Man of the Match: André Carrillo (Al-Hilal)
- Referee: Ali Sabah (Iraq)
- Attendance: 22,549
- Weather: Cool and fine 26 °C (79 °F)

Second leg
Urawa Red Diamonds	Al-Hilal
0	2
- Date: 24 November 2019
- Venue: Saitama Stadium 2002, Saitama
- Man of the Match: Sebastian Giovinco (Al-Hilal)
- Referee: Valentin Kovalenko (Uzbekistan)
- Attendance: 58,109
- Weather: Fine and chilly 14 °C (57 °F)

The 2019 AFC Champions League final was the final of the 2019 AFC Champions League, the 38th edition of the top-level Asian club football tournament organized by the Asian Football Confederation (AFC), and the 17th under the current AFC Champions League title.

The final was contested in two-legged home-and-away format between Saudi Arabian team Al-Hilal and Japanese team Urawa Red Diamonds. The first leg was hosted by Al-Hilal at the King Saud University Stadium in Riyadh on 9 November 2019, while the second leg was hosted by Urawa Red Diamonds at the Saitama Stadium 2002 in Saitama on 24 November 2019. The final was a rematch of the 2017 final, which Urawa Red Diamonds won 2–1 on aggregate.

Al-Hilal won their third Asian club championship, tying the record set by the Pohang Steelers for most in the competition's history. They won 3–0 on aggregate, having defeated the Urawa Red Diamonds 1–0 in the first leg and 2–0 in the second. This marked the first time in eight years that a team from West Zone won the competition since Al Sadd won it in 2011. As Asian champions, Al-Hilal earned the right to represent the AFC at the 2019 FIFA Club World Cup in Qatar, entering at the second round.

== Teams ==
In the following table, finals until 2002 were in the Asian Club Championship era, since 2003 were in the AFC Champions League era.

Team	Region	Previous finals appearances (bold indicates winners)
(Saudi Arabia) Al-Hilal	West Region (Zone: WAFF)	6 (1986, 1987, **1991**, **2000**, 2014, 2017)
(Japan) Urawa Red Diamonds	East Region (Zone: EAFF)	2 (**2007**, **2017**)

Notes

1. The 1986 final was played in four-team round-robin format, with Al-Hilal finishing as runners-up.
2. Al-Hilal was unable to participate in the 1987 final and therefore was declared as runners-up.

== Venues ==
This was the first time that an Asian club final took place at the King Saud University Stadium. Saitama Stadium 2002 hosted an Asian club final for the third time, having previously hosted the second legs of 2007 and 2017.

== Road to the final ==
Note: In all results below, the score of the finalist is given first (H: home; A: away).

(Saudi Arabia) Al-Hilal				Round	(Japan) Urawa Red Diamonds			
Opponent	Result			Group stage	Opponent	Result		
(United Arab Emirates) Al-Ain	1–0 (A)			Matchday 1	(Thailand) Buriram United	3–0 (H)		
(Qatar) Al-Duhail	3–1 (H)			Matchday 2	(China) Beijing FC	0–0 (A)		
(Iran) Esteghlal	1–2 (A)			Matchday 3	(South Korea) Jeonbuk Hyundai Motors	0–1 (H)		
(Iran) Esteghlal	1–0 (H)			Matchday 4	(South Korea) Jeonbuk Hyundai Motors	1–2 (A)		
(United Arab Emirates) Al-Ain	2–0 (H)			Matchday 5	(Thailand) Buriram United	2–1 (A)		
(Qatar) Al-Duhail	2–2 (A)			Matchday 6	(China) Beijing FC	3–0 (H)		
**Group C winners**: Pos / Team / Pld / Pts; **1** / (Saudi Arabia) Al-Hilal / **6** / **13**; 2 / (Qatar) Al-Duhail / 6 / **9**; 3 / (Iran) Esteghlal / 6 / **8**; 4 / (United Arab Emirates) Al-Ain / 6 / **2**; Source: AFC				Final standings	**Group G runners-up**: Pos / Team / Pld / Pts; 1 / (South Korea) Jeonbuk Hyundai Motors / 6 / **13**; **2** / (Japan) Urawa Red Diamonds / **6** / **10**; 3 / (China) Beijing FC / 6 / **7**; 4 / (Thailand) Buriram United / 6 / **4**; Source: AFC			
Opponent	Agg.	1st leg	2nd leg	Knockout stage	Opponent	Agg.	1st leg	2nd leg
(Saudi Arabia) Al-Ahli	4–3	4–2 (A)	0–1 (H)	Round of 16	(South Korea) Ulsan Hyundai	4–2	1–2 (H)	3–0 (A)
(Saudi Arabia) Al-Ittihad	3–1	0–0 (A)	3–1 (H)	Quarter-finals	(China) Shanghai SIPG	3–3 (a)	2–2 (A)	1–1 (H)
(Qatar) Al-Sadd	6–5	4–1 (A)	2–4 (H)	Semi-finals	(China) Guangzhou Evergrande	3–0	2–0 (H)	1–0 (A)

== Format ==
The final was played on a home-and-away two-legged basis, with the order of legs (first leg hosted by team from the West Region, second leg hosted by team from the East Region) reversed from the previous season's final. The away goals rule, extra time (away goals do not apply in extra time) and penalty shoot-out would have been used to decide the winning side if necessary (Regulations, Section 3. 11.2 & 11.3).

== Matches ==
=== First leg ===
==== Summary ====
Peruvian André Carrillo scored the only goal of the match for Al-Hilal.

==== Details ====
9 November 2019
19:30 UTC+3

Al-Hilal (Saudi Arabia)	1–0	(Japan) Urawa Red Diamonds
Carrillo 60'	Live Report; Stats Report

King Saud University Stadium, Riyadh
Attendance: 22,549
Referee: Ali Sabah (Iraq)

**Al-Hilal**	**Urawa Red Diamonds**

GK	1	(Saudi Arabia) Abdullah Al-Mayouf
RB	2	(Saudi Arabia) Mohammed Al-Breik
CB	20	(South Korea) Jang Hyun-soo
CB	5	(Saudi Arabia) Ali Al-Bulaihi	(yellow card) 38'
LB	12	(Saudi Arabia) Yasser Al-Shahrani
RM	19	(Peru) André Carrillo
CM	7	(Saudi Arabia) Salman Al-Faraj (c)
CM	8	(Saudi Arabia) Abdullah Otayf		(substituted off) 89'
LM	29	(Saudi Arabia) Salem Al-Dawsari
CF	9	(Italy) Sebastian Giovinco		(substituted off) 87'
CF	18	(France) Bafétimbi Gomis
Substitutes:
GK	30	(Saudi Arabia) Mohammed Al-Waked
DF	70	(Saudi Arabia) Mohammed Jahfali
MF	24	(Saudi Arabia) Nawaf Al-Abed		(substituted on) 87'
MF	27	(Saudi Arabia) Hattan Bahebri
MF	28	(Saudi Arabia) Mohamed Kanno		(substituted on) 89'
FW	10	(Saudi Arabia) Mohammad Al-Shalhoub
FW	11	(Saudi Arabia) Saleh Al-Shehri
Manager:
(Romania) Răzvan Lucescu

GK	25	(Japan) Haruki Fukushima
CB	31	(Japan) Takuya Iwanami
CB	4	(Japan) Daisuke Suzuki
CB	5	(Japan) Tomoaki Makino
RM	27	(Japan) Daiki Hashioka
CM	8	(Brazil) Ewerton
CM	16	(Japan) Takuya Aoki
LM	41	(Japan) Takahiro Sekine	(substituted off) 85'
AM	7	(Japan) Kazuki Nagasawa	(substituted off) 75'
AM	12	(Brazil) Fabrício
CF	30	(Japan) Shinzo Koroki (c)
Substitutes:
GK	23	(Japan) Nao Iwadate
DF	2	(Brazil) Maurício Antônio
DF	3	(Japan) Tomoya Ugajin	(substituted on) 85'
MF	10	(Japan) Yōsuke Kashiwagi
MF	22	(Japan) Yuki Abe
MF	29	(Japan) Kai Shibato
FW	14	(Japan) Kenyu Sugimoto	(substituted on) 75'
Manager:
(Japan) Tsuyoshi Otsuki

Man of the Match:
André Carrillo (Al-Hilal)

Assistant referees:
Ali Ubaydee (Iraq)
Ameer Hussein (Iraq)
Fourth official:
Watheq Al-Swaiedi (Iraq)
Additional assistant referees:
Mohanad Qasim Sarray (Iraq)
Omar Al-Yaqoubi (Oman)

**Match rules**

- 90 minutes.
- Seven named substitutes, of which up to three may be used.

==== Statistics ====
Overall
Statistic	Al-Hilal	Urawa Red Diamonds
Goals scored	1	0
Total shots	22	2
Shots on target	6	1
Blocked shots	8	1
Ball possession	70%	30%
Corner kicks	9	2
Passes	680	293
Fouls conceded	10	12
Offsides	3	1
Yellow cards	1	0
Red cards	0	0

=== Second leg ===
==== Summary ====
Salem Al-Dawsari scored for Al-Hilal after 74 minutes before Bafétimbi Gomis made his eleventh goal of the tournament, earning him the top goalscorer and best player titles aside of the AFC Champions League trophy.

==== Details ====
24 November 2019
19:01 UTC+9

Urawa Red Diamonds (Japan)	0–2	(Saudi Arabia) Al-Hilal
	Live Report; Stats Report	Al-Dawsari 74'; Gomis 90+3'

Saitama Stadium 2002, Saitama
Attendance: 58,109
Referee: Valentin Kovalenko (Uzbekistan)

**Urawa Red Diamonds**	**Al-Hilal**

GK	1	(Japan) Shusaku Nishikawa
CB	31	(Japan) Takuya Iwanami	(yellow card) 57'
CB	4	(Japan) Daisuke Suzuki
CB	5	(Japan) Tomoaki Makino	(yellow card) 76'
RM	27	(Japan) Daiki Hashioka
CM	8	(Brazil) Ewerton
CM	16	(Japan) Takuya Aoki	(yellow card) 53'	(substituted off) 88'
LM	41	(Japan) Takahiro Sekine	(yellow card) 43'
AM	7	(Japan) Kazuki Nagasawa		(substituted off) 63'
AM	12	(Brazil) Fabrício		(substituted off) 71'
CF	30	(Japan) Shinzo Koroki (c)
Substitutes:
GK	25	(Japan) Haruki Fukushima
DF	2	(Brazil) Maurício Antônio
DF	3	(Japan) Tomoya Ugajin
MF	10	(Japan) Yōsuke Kashiwagi		(substituted on) 63'
MF	22	(Japan) Yuki Abe		(substituted on) 88'
MF	29	(Japan) Kai Shibato
FW	14	(Japan) Kenyu Sugimoto		(substituted on) 71'
Manager:
(Japan) Tsuyoshi Otsuki

GK	1	(Saudi Arabia) Abdullah Al-Mayouf
RB	2	(Saudi Arabia) Mohammed Al-Breik	(substituted off) 80'
CB	20	(South Korea) Jang Hyun-soo
CB	5	(Saudi Arabia) Ali Al-Bulaihi
LB	12	(Saudi Arabia) Yasser Al-Shahrani
RM	19	(Peru) André Carrillo
CM	7	(Saudi Arabia) Salman Al-Faraj (c)
CM	8	(Saudi Arabia) Abdullah Otayf	(substituted off) 90+4'
LM	29	(Saudi Arabia) Salem Al-Dawsari
CF	9	(Italy) Sebastian Giovinco	(substituted off) 88'
CF	18	(France) Bafétimbi Gomis
Substitutes:
GK	30	(Saudi Arabia) Mohammed Al-Waked
DF	17	(Saudi Arabia) Abdullah Al-Hafith	(substituted on) 80'
MF	24	(Saudi Arabia) Nawaf Al-Abed
MF	27	(Saudi Arabia) Hattan Bahebri
MF	28	(Saudi Arabia) Mohamed Kanno	(substituted on) 88'
FW	10	(Saudi Arabia) Mohammad Al-Shalhoub	(substituted on) 90+4'
FW	11	(Saudi Arabia) Saleh Al-Shehri
Manager:
(Romania) Răzvan Lucescu

Man of the Match:
Sebastian Giovinco (Al-Hilal)

Assistant referees:
Andrey Tsapenko (Uzbekistan)
Timur Gaynullin (Uzbekistan)
Fourth official:
Ruslan Seratzidinov (Uzbekistan)
Additional assistant referees:
Aziz Asimov (Uzbekistan)
Ilgiz Tantashev (Uzbekistan)

**Match rules**

- 90 minutes.
- 30 minutes of extra time if tied on aggregate and away goals.
- Penalty shoot-out if still tied after extra time (no away goals rule applied).
- Seven named substitutes, of which up to three may be used.

==== Statistics ====
Overall
Statistic	Urawa Red Diamonds	Al-Hilal
Goals scored	0	2
Total shots	6	19
Shots on target	2	8
Blocked shots	2	7
Ball possession	54%	46%
Corner kicks	5	7
Passes	370	307
Fouls conceded	13	20
Offsides	2	4
Yellow cards	4	0
Red cards	0	0

== See also ==
- 2019 AFC Cup Final
