= AFC Champions League Elite clubs performance comparison =

The comparison of the performances of all the clubs that participated in the AFC Champions League Elite is presented below. The qualifying rounds are not taken into account.

== Classification ==
C	Champion
F	Runner-up
SF	Semi-finals
QF	Quarter-finals
R16	Round of 16
GS; LS	Group stage League stage
•	Did not participate

== Performance ==
Countries are ranked by total number of participations, then by the number of different participating clubs, and then alphabetically. Clubs are ranked by number of participations, then by titles, runner-up finishes, semi-final appearances, quarter-final appearances, and finally alphabetically.

#	Clubs (# of participations)	24–25	25–26	26–27
(Japan)	JAPAN (11)	(3)	(3)	(5)
1	Vissel Kobe (3)	R16	SF	
2	Kawasaki Frontale (1)	F	•	•
3	Machida Zelvia (1)	•	F	•
4	Yokohama F. Marinos (1)	QF	•	•
5	Gamba Osaka (1)	•	•	
6	Kashima Antlers (1)	•	•	
7	Kashiwa Reysol (1)	•	•	
8	Kyoto Sanga (1)	•	•	
9	Sanfrecce Hiroshima (1)	•	R16	•
(Saudi Arabia)	SAUDI ARABIA (11)	(3)	(3)	(5)
1	Al-Ahli (3)	C	C	
2	Al-Hilal (3)	SF	R16	
3	Al-Nassr (2)	SF	•	
4	Al-Ittihad (2)	•	QF	
5	Al-Qadsiah (1)	•	•	
(South Korea)	SOUTH KOREA (9)	(3)	(3)	(3)
1	Pohang Steelers (2)	LS	•	
2	Ulsan HD (2)	LS	LS	•
3	Gwangju FC (1)	QF	•	•
4	Daejeon Hana Citizen (1)	•	•	
5	Gangwon FC (1)	•	R16	•
6	Jeonbuk Hyundai Motors (1)	•	•	
7	FC Seoul (1)	•	R16	•
(Qatar)	QATAR (9)	(3)	(3)	(3)
1	Al-Sadd (3)	QF	QF	
2	Al-Gharafa (3)	LS	LS	
3	Al-Duhail (1)	•	R16	•
4	Al-Rayyan (1)	R16	•	•
5	Al-Shamal (1)	•	•	
(United Arab Emirates)	UNITED ARAB EMIRATES (8)	(2)	(3)	(3)
1	Shabab Al-Ahli (2)	•	SF	
2	Al-Ain (2)	LS	•	
3	Al-Wasl (2)	R16	•	
4	Al-Wahda (1)	•	R16	•
5	Sharjah (1)	•	LS	•
(China)	CHINA (7)	(2)	(3)	(2)
1	Shanghai Port (3)	R16	LS	
2	Shanghai Shenhua (2)	R16	LS	•
3	Beijing Guoan (1)	•	•	
4	Chengdu Rongcheng (1)	•	LS	•
(Iran)	IRAN (5)	(2)	(1)	(2)
1	Esteghlal (2)	R16	•	
2	Tractor (2)	•	R16	
3	Persepolis (1)	LS	•	•
(Thailand)	THAILAND (5)	(1)	(1)	(3)
1	Buriram United (3)	QF	QF	
2	Port (1)	•	•	
3	Ratchaburi (1)	•	•	
(Uzbekistan)	UZBEKISTAN (4)	(1)	(1)	(2)
1	Pakhtakor (2)	R16	•	
2	Nasaf (1)	•	LS	•
3	Neftchi (1)	•	•	
(Australia)	AUSTRALIA (3)	(1)	(1)	(1)
1	Central Coast Mariners (1)	LS	•	•
2	Melbourne City (1)	•	R16	•
3	Newcastle Jets (1)	•	•	
(Iraq)	IRAQ (3)	(1)	(1)	(1)
1	Al-Shorta (2)	LS	LS	•
2	Al-Quwa Al-Jawiya (1)	•	•	
(Malaysia)	MALAYSIA (3)	(1)	(1)	(1)
1	Johor Darul Ta'zim (3)	R16	QF	
(Vietnam)	VIETNAM (1)	(0)	(0)	(1)
1	Công An Hà Nội (1)	•	•	

== AFC Champions League performance (2002–2024) ==
Countries are ranked by total number of participations, then by the number of different participating clubs, and then alphabetically. Clubs are ranked by number of participations, then by titles, runner-up finishes, semi-final appearances, quarter-final appearances, and finally alphabetically.

#	Clubs (# of participations)	02–03	2004	2005	2006	2007	2008	2009	2010	2011	2012	2013	2014	2015	2016	2017	2018	2019	2020	2021	2022	23–24
(South Korea)	SOUTH KOREA (73)	(2)	(2)	(2)	(2)	(3)	(2)	(4)	(4)	(4)	(4)	(4)	(4)	(4)	(4)	(4)	(4)	(4)	(4)	(4)	(4)	(4)
1	Jeonbuk Hyundai Motors (16)	•	SF	•	C	QF	•	•	QF	F	GS	R16	R16	QF	C	•	QF	R16	GS	QF	SF	QF
2	Ulsan Hyundai (11)	•	•	•	SF	•	•	GS	•	•	C	•	GS	•	•	GS	R16	R16	C	SF	GS	SF
3	Suwon Samsung Bluewings (10)	•	•	GS	•	•	•	R16	QF	SF	•	GS	•	R16	GS	GS	SF	•	QF	•	•	•
4	Pohang Steelers (9)	•	•	•	•	•	GS	C	QF	•	GS	GS	QF	•	GS	•	•	•	•	F	•	R16
5	FC Seoul (8)	•	•	•	•	•	•	QF	•	QF	•	F	SF	R16	SF	GS	•	•	GS	•	•	•
6	Seongnam FC (6)	GS	F	•	•	SF	•	•	C	•	R16	•	•	R16	•	•	•	•	•	•	•	•
7	Daegu FC (3)	•	•	•	•	•	•	•	•	•	•	•	•	•	•	•	•	GS	•	R16	R16	•
8	Jeju United (3)	•	•	•	•	•	•	•	•	GS	•	•	•	•	•	R16	GS	•	•	•	•	•
9	Jeonnam Dragons (3)	•	•	•	•	GS	GS	•	•	•	•	•	•	•	•	•	•	•	•	•	GS	•
10	Busan IPark (1)	•	•	SF	•	•	•	•	•	•	•	•	•	•	•	•	•	•	•	•	•	•
11	Daejeon Hana Citizen (1)	GS	•	•	•	•	•	•	•	•	•	•	•	•	•	•	•	•	•	•	•	•
12	Gyeongnam FC (1)	•	•	•	•	•	•	•	•	•	•	•	•	•	•	•	•	GS	•	•	•	•
13	Incheon United (1)	•	•	•	•	•	•	•	•	•	•	•	•	•	•	•	•	•	•	•	•	GS
(Japan)	JAPAN (72)	(2)	(2)	(2)	(2)	(2)	(3)	(4)	(4)	(4)	(4)	(4)	(4)	(4)	(4)	(4)	(4)	(4)	(3)	(4)	(4)	(4)
1	Gamba Osaka (10)	•	•	•	GS	•	C	R16	R16	R16	GS	•	•	SF	GS	GS	•	•	•	GS	•	•
2	Kawasaki Frontale (10)	•	•	•	•	QF	•	QF	GS	•	•	•	R16	•	•	QF	GS	GS	•	R16	GS	R16
3	Urawa Red Diamonds (9)	•	•	•	•	C	SF	•	•	•	•	GS	•	GS	R16	C	•	F	•	•	C	GS
4	Kashima Antlers (9)	GS	•	•	•	•	QF	R16	R16	R16	•	•	•	GS	•	R16	C	QF	•	•	•	•
5	Yokohama F. Marinos (6)	•	GS	GS	•	•	•	•	•	•	•	•	GS	•	•	•	•	•	R16	•	R16	F
6	Sanfrecce Hiroshima (5)	•	•	•	•	•	•	•	GS	•	•	GS	R16	•	GS	•	•	R16	•	•	•	•
7	Kashiwa Reysol (4)	•	•	•	•	•	•	•	•	•	R16	SF	•	QF	•	•	GS	•	•	•	•	•
8	Nagoya Grampus (4)	•	•	•	•	•	•	SF	•	R16	R16	•	•	•	•	•	•	•	•	QF	•	•
9	Cerezo Osaka (4)	•	•	•	•	•	•	•	•	QF	•	•	R16	•	•	•	GS	•	•	R16	•	•
10	FC Tokyo (3)	•	•	•	•	•	•	•	•	•	R16	•	•	•	R16	•	•	•	R16	•	•	•
11	Vissel Kobe (2)	•	•	•	•	•	•	•	•	•	•	•	•	•	•	•	•	•	SF	•	QF	•
12	Júbilo Iwata (2)	•	GS	GS	•	•	•	•	•	•	•	•	•	•	•	•	•	•	•	•	•	•
13	Shimizu S-Pulse (1)	GS	•	•	•	•	•	•	•	•	•	•	•	•	•	•	•	•	•	•	•	•
14	Tokyo Verdy (1)	•	•	•	GS	•	•	•	•	•	•	•	•	•	•	•	•	•	•	•	•	•
15	Vegalta Sendai (1)	•	•	•	•	•	•	•	•	•	•	GS	•	•	•	•	•	•	•	•	•	•
16	Ventforet Kofu (1)	•	•	•	•	•	•	•	•	•	•	•	•	•	•	•	•	•	•	•	•	R16
(Saudi Arabia)	SAUDI ARABIA (68)	(1)	(2)	(3)	(3)	(2)	(2)	(4)	(4)	(4)	(3)	(4)	(4)	(4)	(4)	(4)	(2)	(4)	(3)	(3)	(4)	(4)
1	Al-Hilal (18)	GS	GS	•	GS	QF	•	R16	SF	R16	QF	R16	F	SF	R16	F	GS	C	•	C	F	SF
2	Al-Ittihad (12)	•	C	C	QF	•	GS	F	GS	SF	SF	•	QF	•	GS	•	•	QF	•	•	•	QF
3	Al-Ahli (12)	•	•	QF	•	•	GS	•	GS	•	F	QF	•	R16	GS	QF	R16	R16	QF	GS	•	•
4	Al-Shabab (10)	•	•	GS	QF	GS	•	R16	SF	R16	•	QF	R16	GS	•	•	•	•	•	•	QF	•
5	Al-Nassr (7)	•	•	•	•	•	•	•	•	R16	•	•	•	GS	GS	•	•	QF	SF	SF	•	QF
6	Al-Taawoun (3)	•	•	•	•	•	•	•	•	•	•	•	•	•	•	GS	•	•	R16	•	GS	•
7	Al-Ettifaq (2)	•	•	•	•	•	•	R16	•	•	•	GS	•	•	•	•	•	•	•	•	•	•
8	Al-Fateh (2)	•	•	•	•	•	•	•	•	•	•	•	GS	•	•	GS	•	•	•	•	•	•
9	Al-Faisaly (1)	•	•	•	•	•	•	•	•	•	•	•	•	•	•	•	•	•	•	•	R16	•
10	Al-Fayha (1)	•	•	•	•	•	•	•	•	•	•	•	•	•	•	•	•	•	•	•	•	R16
(China)	CHINA (65)	(2)	(2)	(2)	(2)	(2)	(2)	(4)	(4)	(4)	(3)	(4)	(4)	(4)	(4)	(3)	(4)	(4)	(4)	(2)	(2)	(3)
1	Guangzhou (Note: Club no longer exists.) (11)	•	•	•	•	•	•	•	•	•	QF	C	QF	C	GS	QF	R16	SF	GS	GS	GS	•
2	Shandong Taishan (11)	•	•	QF	•	GS	•	GS	GS	GS	•	•	GS	GS	QF	•	•	R16	•	•	GS	QF
3	Beijing Guoan (10)	•	•	•	•	•	GS	GS	R16	•	GS	R16	GS	R16	•	•	•	GS	QF	GS	•	•
4	Shanghai Shenhua (8)	GS	GS	•	QF	GS	•	GS	•	GS	•	•	•	•	•	•	GS	•	GS	•	•	•
5	Shanghai Port (5)	•	•	•	•	•	•	•	•	•	•	•	•	•	QF	SF	R16	QF	R16	•	•	•
6	Dalian Shide (3)	SF	QF	•	GS	•	•	•	•	•	•	•	•	•	•	•	•	•	•	•	•	•
7	Jiangsu Suning (3)	•	•	•	•	•	•	•	•	•	•	GS	•	•	GS	R16	•	•	•	•	•	•
8	Tianjin Teda (3)	•	•	•	•	•	•	GS	•	R16	GS	•	•	•	•	•	•	•	•	•	•	•
9	Beijing Renhe (2)	•	•	•	•	•	•	•	•	•	•	GS	GS	•	•	•	•	•	•	•	•	•
10	Changchun Yatai (2)	•	•	•	•	•	GS	•	GS	•	•	•	•	•	•	•	•	•	•	•	•	•
11	Zhejiang (2)	•	•	•	•	•	•	•	•	GS	•	•	•	•	•	•	•	•	•	•	•	GS
12	Shenzhen Jianlibao (1)	•	•	SF	•	•	•	•	•	•	•	•	•	•	•	•	•	•	•	•	•	•
13	Tianjin Quanjian (1)	•	•	•	•	•	•	•	•	•	•	•	•	•	•	•	QF	•	•	•	•	•
14	Henan Jianye (1)	•	•	•	•	•	•	•	GS	•	•	•	•	•	•	•	•	•	•	•	•	•
15	Guangzhou R&F (1)	•	•	•	•	•	•	•	•	•	•	•	•	GS	•	•	•	•	•	•	•	•
16	Wuhan Three Towns (1)	•	•	•	•	•	•	•	•	•	•	•	•	•	•	•	•	•	•	•	•	GS
(Iran)	IRAN (64)	(2)	(2)	(2)	(2)	(1)	(2)	(4)	(4)	(4)	(3)	(3)	(4)	(4)	(3)	(4)	(4)	(3)	(4)	(4)	(2)	(3)
1	Sepahan (14)	•	GS	GS	•	F	GS	GS	GS	QF	QF	GS	GS	•	GS	•	•	•	GS	•	GS	R16
2	Esteghlal (12)	GS	•	•	•	•	•	GS	R16	GS	R16	SF	GS	•	•	R16	QF	GS	R16	R16	•	•
3	Persepolis (11)	GS	•	•	•	•	•	R16	•	GS	R16	•	•	R16	•	SF	F	GS	F	QF	•	GS
4	Zob Ahan (7)	•	GS	•	•	•	•	•	F	QF	•	•	•	•	R16	GS	R16	R16	•	•	•	•
5	Tractor (6)	•	•	•	•	•	•	•	•	•	•	GS	GS	GS	R16	•	GS	•	•	R16	•	•
6	Foolad (5)	•	•	•	GS	•	•	•	•	•	•	•	R16	GS	•	•	•	•	•	GS	QF	•
7	Saba Qom (2)	•	•	•	GS	•	•	GS	•	•	•	•	•	•	•	•	•	•	•	•	•	•
8	Naft Tehran (1)	•	•	•	•	•	•	•	•	•	•	•	•	QF	•	•	•	•	•	•	•	•
9	Pas (1)	•	•	QF	•	•	•	•	•	•	•	•	•	•	•	•	•	•	•	•	•	•
10	Saipa (1)	•	•	•	•	•	QF	•	•	•	•	•	•	•	•	•	•	•	•	•	•	•
11	Esteghlal Khuzestan (1)	•	•	•	•	•	•	•	•	•	•	•	•	•	•	R16	•	•	•	•	•	•
12	Mes Kerman (1)	•	•	•	•	•	•	•	R16	•	•	•	•	•	•	•	•	•	•	•	•	•
13	Nassaji Mazandaran (1)	•	•	•	•	•	•	•	•	•	•	•	•	•	•	•	•	•	•	•	•	GS
14	Shahr Khodro (1)	•	•	•	•	•	•	•	•	•	•	•	•	•	•	•	•	•	GS	•	•	•
(United Arab Emirates)	UNITED ARAB EMIRATES (60)	(1)	(3)	(2)	(2)	(2)	(2)	(3)	(4)	(4)	(4)	(4)	(3)	(2)	(3)	(4)	(4)	(3)	(3)	(3)	(3)	(2)
1	Al-Ain (16)	C	QF	F	QF	GS	•	•	GS	GS	•	GS	SF	R16	F	QF	R16	GS	GS	•	•	C
2	Al-Wahda (10)	•	QF	•	GS	SF	GS	•	GS	GS	•	•	•	•	•	GS	GS	R16	•	QF	•	•
3	Al-Jazira (10)	•	•	•	•	•	•	GS	GS	GS	R16	GS	R16	•	GS	GS	R16	•	•	•	GS	•
4	Shabab Al-Ahli (9)	•	•	GS	•	•	•	GS	GS	•	•	•	GS	F	•	R16	•	•	R16	GS	R16	•
5	Sharjah (5)	•	QF	•	•	•	•	•	•	•	•	•	•	•	•	•	•	•	GS	R16	GS	GS
6	Al-Nasr (3)	•	•	•	•	•	•	•	•	•	GS	GS	•	•	QF	•	•	•	•	•	•	•
7	Al-Shabab (3)	•	•	•	•	•	•	GS	•	•	GS	R16	•	•	•	•	•	•	•	•	•	•
8	Al-Wasl (3)	•	•	•	•	•	GS	•	•	•	•	•	•	•	•	•	GS	GS	•	•	•	•
9	Baniyas (1)	•	•	•	•	•	•	•	•	•	R16	•	•	•	•	•	•	•	•	•	•	•
10	Emirates (1)	•	•	•	•	•	•	•	•	GS	•	•	•	•	•	•	•	•	•	•	•	•
(Qatar)	QATAR (54)	(1)	(2)	(2)	(2)	(2)	(2)	(2)	(2)	(3)	(4)	(4)	(4)	(2)	(2)	(2)	(4)	(3)	(2)	(3)	(4)	(2)
1	Al-Sadd (16)	GS	GS	QF	GS	GS	GS	•	GS	C	•	•	QF	R16	•	•	SF	SF	R16	GS	GS	GS
2	Al-Duhail (12)	•	•	•	•	•	•	•	•	•	GS	QF	GS	QF	R16	R16	QF	R16	GS	GS	SF	GS
3	Al-Rayyan (11)	•	•	GS	•	GS	•	•	•	GS	GS	GS	GS	•	•	GS	GS	GS	•	GS	R16	•
4	Al-Gharafa (9)	•	•	•	GS	•	GS	GS	QF	GS	GS	R16	•	•	•	•	GS	•	•	•	GS	•
5	El-Jaish (3)	•	•	•	•	•	•	•	•	•	•	R16	GS	•	SF	•	•	•	•	•	•	•
6	Umm-Salal (1)	•	•	•	•	•	•	SF	•	•	•	•	•	•	•	•	•	•	•	•	•	•
7	Al-Arabi (1)	•	•	•	•	•	•	•	•	•	GS	•	•	•	•	•	•	•	•	•	•	•
8	Qatar SC (1)	•	GS	•	•	•	•	•	•	•	•	•	•	•	•	•	•	•	•	•	•	•
(Uzbekistan)	UZBEKISTAN (46)	(1)	(2)	(2)	(2)	(2)	(2)	(2)	(2)	(2)	(3)	(2)	(1)	(4)	(4)	(2)	(2)	(2)	(1)	(2)	(2)	(4)
1	Pakhtakor (18)	SF	SF	GS	GS	GS	GS	QF	R16	GS	GS	GS	•	GS	GS	•	•	GS	QF	GS	GS	GS
2	Bunyodkor (10)	•	•	•	•	•	SF	QF	R16	R16	SF	R16	R16	GS	GS	GS	•	•	•	•	•	•
3	Nasaf (6)	•	•	•	•	•	•	•	•	•	GS	•	•	GS	GS	•	GS	•	•	•	R16	R16
4	Lokomotiv Tashkent (5)	•	•	•	•	•	•	•	•	•	•	•	•	GS	QF	GS	GS	GS	•	•	•	•
5	Neftchi Fergana (3)	•	GS	GS	•	GS	•	•	•	•	•	•	•	•	•	•	•	•	•	•	•	•
6	AGMK (2)	•	•	•	•	•	•	•	•	•	•	•	•	•	•	•	•	•	•	GS	•	GS
7	Mash'al Mubarek (1)	•	•	•	GS	•	•	•	•	•	•	•	•	•	•	•	•	•	•	•	•	•
8	Navbahor (1)	•	•	•	•	•	•	•	•	•	•	•	•	•	•	•	•	•	•	•	•	R16
(Australia)	AUSTRALIA (34)	(0)	(0)	(0)	(0)	(2)	(2)	(2)	(2)	(2)	(3)	(1)	(3)	(2)	(2)	(3)	(2)	(2)	(3)	(0)	(2)	(1)
1	Melbourne Victory (8)	•	•	•	•	•	GS	•	GS	GS	•	•	GS	•	R16	•	GS	GS	R16	•	•	•
2	Sydney FC (7)	•	•	•	•	GS	•	•	•	GS	•	•	•	•	R16	•	GS	GS	GS	•	GS	•
3	Adelaide United (5)	•	•	•	•	GS	F	•	R16	•	QF	•	•	•	•	GS	•	•	•	•	•	•
4	Central Coast Mariners (4)	•	•	•	•	•	•	GS	•	•	GS	R16	GS	•	•	•	•	•	•	•	•	•
5	Western Sydney Wanderers (3)	•	•	•	•	•	•	•	•	•	•	•	C	GS	•	GS	•	•	•	•	•	•
6	Brisbane Roar (3)	•	•	•	•	•	•	•	•	•	GS	•	•	GS	•	GS	•	•	•	•	•	•
7	Melbourne City (2)	•	•	•	•	•	•	•	•	•	•	•	•	•	•	•	•	•	•	•	GS	GS
8	Newcastle Jets (1)	•	•	•	•	•	•	R16	•	•	•	•	•	•	•	•	•	•	•	•	•	•
9	Perth Glory (1)	•	•	•	•	•	•	•	•	•	•	•	•	•	•	•	•	•	GS	•	•	•
(Thailand)	THAILAND (28)	(2)	(2)	(2)	(0)	(1)	(2)	(0)	(0)	(0)	(1)	(2)	(1)	(1)	(1)	(1)	(1)	(1)	(1)	(4)	(2)	(3)
1	Buriram United (8)	•	•	•	•	•	•	•	•	•	GS	QF	GS	GS	GS	•	R16	GS	•	•	•	GS
2	BEC Tero Sasana (3)	F	GS	GS	•	•	•	•	•	•	•	•	•	•	•	•	•	•	•	•	•	•
3	BG Pathum United (3)	•	•	•	•	•	•	•	•	•	•	•	•	•	•	•	•	•	•	R16	QF	GS
4	Chiangrai United (3)	•	•	•	•	•	•	•	•	•	•	•	•	•	•	•	•	•	GS	GS	GS	•
5	Krung Thai Bank (3)	•	GS	GS	•	•	GS	•	•	•	•	•	•	•	•	•	•	•	•	•	•	•
6	Bangkok United (2)	•	•	•	•	GS	•	•	•	•	•	•	•	•	•	•	•	•	•	•	•	R16
7	Muangthong United (2)	•	•	•	•	•	•	•	•	•	•	GS	•	•	•	R16	•	•	•	•	•	•
8	Chonburi (1)	•	•	•	•	•	GS	•	•	•	•	•	•	•	•	•	•	•	•	•	•	•
9	Osotsapa (1)	GS	•	•	•	•	•	•	•	•	•	•	•	•	•	•	•	•	•	•	•	•
10	Port (1)	•	•	•	•	•	•	•	•	•	•	•	•	•	•	•	•	•	•	GS	•	•
11	Ratchaburi Mitr Phol (1)	•	•	•	•	•	•	•	•	•	•	•	•	•	•	•	•	•	•	GS	•	•
(Iraq)	IRAQ (17)	(1)	(2)	(2)	(2)	(2)	(2)	(0)	(0)	(0)	(0)	(0)	(0)	(0)	(0)	(0)	(0)	(1)	(1)	(2)	(1)	(1)
1	Al-Quwa Al-Jawiya (6)	•	GS	•	GS	•	GS	•	•	•	•	•	•	•	•	•	•	•	•	GS	GS	GS
2	Al-Shorta (4)	•	GS	GS	•	•	•	•	•	•	•	•	•	•	•	•	•	•	GS	GS	•	•
3	Al-Zawra'a (3)	•	•	GS	•	GS	•	•	•	•	•	•	•	•	•	•	•	GS	•	•	•	•
4	Al-Mina'a (1)	•	•	•	GS	•	•	•	•	•	•	•	•	•	•	•	•	•	•	•	•	•
5	Al-Najaf (1)	•	•	•	•	GS	•	•	•	•	•	•	•	•	•	•	•	•	•	•	•	•
6	Al-Talaba (1)	GS	•	•	•	•	•	•	•	•	•	•	•	•	•	•	•	•	•	•	•	•
7	Erbil (1)	•	•	•	•	•	GS	•	•	•	•	•	•	•	•	•	•	•	•	•	•	•
(Vietnam)	VIETNAM (14)	(0)	(2)	(2)	(2)	(1)	(2)	(0)	(0)	(0)	(0)	(0)	(0)	(1)	(1)	(0)	(0)	(0)	(0)	(1)	(1)	(1)
1	Becamex Bình Dương (3)	•	•	•	•	•	GS	•	•	•	•	•	•	GS	GS	•	•	•	•	•	•	•
2	Hoàng Anh Gia Lai (3)	•	GS	GS	•	•	•	•	•	•	•	•	•	•	•	•	•	•	•	•	GS	•
3	Bình Định (2)	•	GS	GS	•	•	•	•	•	•	•	•	•	•	•	•	•	•	•	•	•	•
4	Long An (2)	•	•	•	GS	GS	•	•	•	•	•	•	•	•	•	•	•	•	•	•	•	•
5	Da Nang (1)	•	•	•	GS	•	•	•	•	•	•	•	•	•	•	•	•	•	•	•	•	•
6	Hanoi (1)	•	•	•	•	•	•	•	•	•	•	•	•	•	•	•	•	•	•	•	•	GS
7	Nam Dinh (1)	•	•	•	•	•	GS	•	•	•	•	•	•	•	•	•	•	•	•	•	•	•
8	Viettel (1)	•	•	•	•	•	•	•	•	•	•	•	•	•	•	•	•	•	•	GS	•	•
(Indonesia)	INDONESIA (9)	(0)	(2)	(2)	(0)	(2)	(0)	(1)	(1)	(1)	(0)	(0)	(0)	(0)	(0)	(0)	(0)	(0)	(0)	(0)	(0)	(0)
1	Arema (2)	•	•	•	•	GS	•	•	•	GS	•	•	•	•	•	•	•	•	•	•	•	•
2	Persik Kediri (2)	•	GS	•	•	GS	•	•	•	•	•	•	•	•	•	•	•	•	•	•	•	•
3	PSM Makassar (2)	•	GS	GS	•	•	•	•	•	•	•	•	•	•	•	•	•	•	•	•	•	•
4	Persebaya Surabaya (1)	•	•	GS	•	•	•	•	•	•	•	•	•	•	•	•	•	•	•	•	•	•
5	Persipura Jayapura (1)	•	•	•	•	•	•	•	GS	•	•	•	•	•	•	•	•	•	•	•	•	•
6	Sriwijaya (1)	•	•	•	•	•	•	GS	•	•	•	•	•	•	•	•	•	•	•	•	•	•
(Kuwait)	KUWAIT (9)	(0)	(1)	(2)	(2)	(2)	(2)	(0)	(0)	(0)	(0)	(0)	(0)	(0)	(0)	(0)	(0)	(0)	(0)	(0)	(0)	(0)
1	Al-Arabi (3)	•	GS	•	GS	GS	•	•	•	•	•	•	•	•	•	•	•	•	•	•	•	•
2	Al-Kuwait (3)	•	•	GS	•	GS	GS	•	•	•	•	•	•	•	•	•	•	•	•	•	•	•
3	Al-Qadsia (2)	•	•	•	SF	•	QF	•	•	•	•	•	•	•	•	•	•	•	•	•	•	•
4	Al-Salmiya (1)	•	•	GS	•	•	•	•	•	•	•	•	•	•	•	•	•	•	•	•	•	•
(Syria)	SYRIA (8)	(0)	(0)	(2)	(2)	(2)	(2)	(0)	(0)	(0)	(0)	(0)	(0)	(0)	(0)	(0)	(0)	(0)	(0)	(0)	(0)	(0)
1	Al-Karamah (3)	•	•	•	F	QF	QF	•	•	•	•	•	•	•	•	•	•	•	•	•	•	•
2	Al-Ittihad (3)	•	•	•	GS	GS	GS	•	•	•	•	•	•	•	•	•	•	•	•	•	•	•
3	Al-Jaish (1)	•	•	GS	•	•	•	•	•	•	•	•	•	•	•	•	•	•	•	•	•	•
4	Al-Wahda (1)	•	•	GS	•	•	•	•	•	•	•	•	•	•	•	•	•	•	•	•	•	•
(Singapore)	SINGAPORE (5)	(0)	(0)	(0)	(0)	(0)	(0)	(1)	(1)	(0)	(0)	(0)	(0)	(0)	(0)	(0)	(0)	(0)	(0)	(1)	(1)	(1)
1	Lion City Sailors (2)	•	•	•	•	•	•	•	•	•	•	•	•	•	•	•	•	•	•	•	GS	GS
2	Singapore Armed Forces (2)	•	•	•	•	•	•	GS	GS	•	•	•	•	•	•	•	•	•	•	•	•	•
3	Tampines Rovers (1)	•	•	•	•	•	•	•	•	•	•	•	•	•	•	•	•	•	•	GS	•	•
(Hong Kong)	HONG KONG (5)	(0)	(0)	(0)	(0)	(0)	(0)	(0)	(0)	(0)	(0)	(0)	(0)	(0)	(0)	(1)	(1)	(0)	(0)	(1)	(1)	(1)
1	Kitchee (4)	•	•	•	•	•	•	•	•	•	•	•	•	•	•	•	GS	•	•	GS	R16	GS
2	Eastern (1)	•	•	•	•	•	•	•	•	•	•	•	•	•	•	GS	•	•	•	•	•	•
(Philippines)	PHILIPPINES (4)	(0)	(0)	(0)	(0)	(0)	(0)	(0)	(0)	(0)	(0)	(0)	(0)	(0)	(0)	(0)	(0)	(0)	(0)	(2)	(1)	(1)
1	United City (2)	•	•	•	•	•	•	•	•	•	•	•	•	•	•	•	•	•	•	GS	GS	•
2	Kaya–Iloilo (2)	•	•	•	•	•	•	•	•	•	•	•	•	•	•	•	•	•	•	GS	•	GS
(Malaysia)	MALAYSIA (4)	(0)	(0)	(0)	(0)	(0)	(0)	(0)	(0)	(0)	(0)	(0)	(0)	(0)	(0)	(0)	(0)	(1)	(0)	(1)	(1)	(1)
1	Johor Darul Ta'zim (4)	•	•	•	•	•	•	•	•	•	•	•	•	•	•	•	•	GS	•	GS	R16	GS
(India)	INDIA (3)	(0)	(0)	(0)	(0)	(0)	(0)	(0)	(0)	(0)	(0)	(0)	(0)	(0)	(0)	(0)	(0)	(0)	(0)	(1)	(1)	(1)
1	Mumbai City (2)	•	•	•	•	•	•	•	•	•	•	•	•	•	•	•	•	•	•	•	GS	GS
2	Goa (1)	•	•	•	•	•	•	•	•	•	•	•	•	•	•	•	•	•	•	GS	•	•
(Jordan)	JORDAN (3)	(0)	(0)	(0)	(0)	(0)	(0)	(0)	(0)	(0)	(0)	(0)	(0)	(0)	(0)	(0)	(0)	(0)	(0)	(1)	(1)	(1)
1	Al-Wehdat (2)	•	•	•	•	•	•	•	•	•	•	•	•	•	•	•	•	•	•	GS	GS	•
2	Al-Faisaly (1)	•	•	•	•	•	•	•	•	•	•	•	•	•	•	•	•	•	•	•	•	GS
(Turkmenistan)	TURKMENISTAN (3)	(1)	(0)	(0)	(0)	(0)	(0)	(0)	(0)	(0)	(0)	(0)	(0)	(0)	(0)	(0)	(0)	(0)	(0)	(0)	(1)	(1)
1	Ahal (2)	•	•	•	•	•	•	•	•	•	•	•	•	•	•	•	•	•	•	•	GS	GS
2	Nisa Aşgabat (1)	GS	•	•	•	•	•	•	•	•	•	•	•	•	•	•	•	•	•	•	•	•
(Tajikistan)	TAJIKISTAN (3)	(0)	(0)	(0)	(0)	(0)	(0)	(0)	(0)	(0)	(0)	(0)	(0)	(0)	(0)	(0)	(0)	(0)	(0)	(1)	(1)	(1)
1	Istiklol (3)	•	•	•	•	•	•	•	•	•	•	•	•	•	•	•	•	•	•	R16	GS	GS

== See also ==
- AFC Champions League Elite
- Asian Club Championship and AFC Champions League Elite records and statistics
