= Abdulrahman Al-Jassim =

Qatari football referee (born 1987)

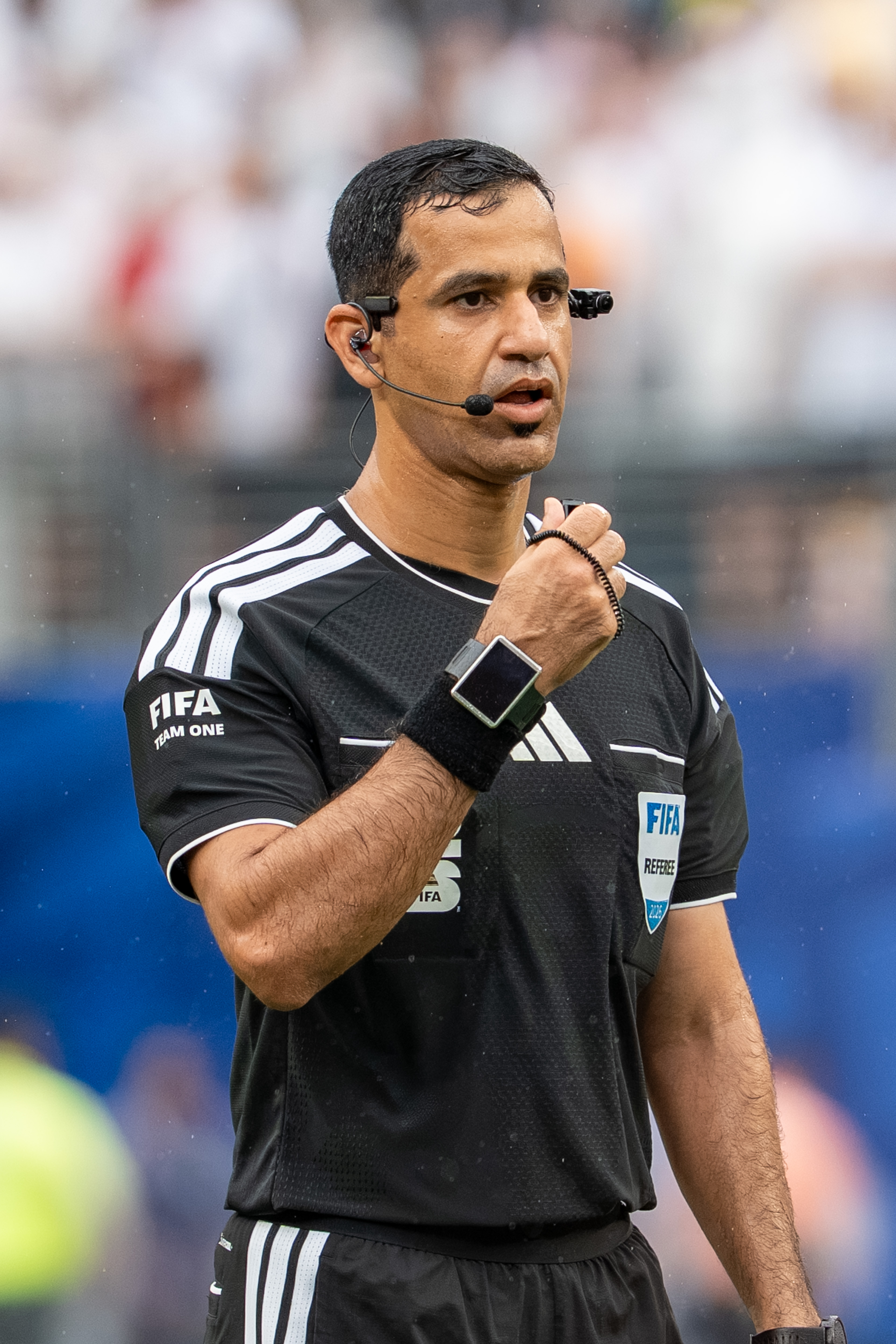
- Al-Jassim at the 2026 FIFA World Cup.
- Full name: Abdulrahman Ibrahim Al-Jassim
- Born: 14 October 1987 (age 39); Qatar

International
Years	League	Role
2013–	FIFA	Referee

Abdulrahman Ibrahim Al-Jassim (Arabic: عبد الرحمن الجاسم; born 14 October 1987) is a Qatari football referee who has been a full international referee for FIFA since 2013.

== Career ==
He was one of the referees for the 2017 FIFA U-20 World Cup in South Korea. Al-Jassim was appointed to be a Video Assistant Referee for the 2018 FIFA World Cup in Russia. Al-Jassim was also appointed to be a referee at the 2019 AFC Asian Cup in the United Arab Emirates. He was also the AFC Champions League referee. In June 2019 it was announced that Al-Jassim would officiate in the 2019 CONCACAF Gold Cup as part of a referee exchange program between CONCACAF and the AFC, which had previously seen Mexican referee César Arturo Ramos in the 2019 AFC Asian Cup. The FIFA Referees Committee appointed Abdulrahman for 2019 FIFA Club World Cup in Qatar on 14 November as part of an all-Qatari trio of officials. He officiated the final between Liverpool and Flamengo at the Khalifa International Stadium in Doha. He was appointed to the referee team for the 2022 FIFA World Cup, in his native Qatar.

== Record ==
2019 AFC Asian Cup – United Arab Emirates
Date	Match	Venue	Round
8 January 2019	Iraq – Vietnam	Abu Dhabi	Group stage
16 January 2019	South Korea – China	Abu Dhabi	Group stage
21 January 2019	Australia – Uzbekistan	Al Ain	Round of 16
24 January 2019	China – Iran	Abu Dhabi	Quarter-finals

2019 CONCACAF Gold Cup – United States
Date	Match	Venue	Round
19 June 2019	Cuba – Martinique	Denver	Group stage
26 June 2019	Panama – United States	Kansas City	Group stage
2 July 2019	Haiti – Mexico	Glendale	Semi-finals

2022 FIFA World Cup – Qatar
Date	Match	Venue	Round
21 November 2022	United States – Wales	Al Rayyan	Group Stage
17 December 2022	Croatia – Morocco	Al Rayyan	Match for third place

2023 AFC Asian Cup – Qatar
Date	Match	Venue	Round
14 January 2024	Iran – Palestine	Al Rayyan	Group stage

2024-25 AFC Champions League Elite – Saudi Arabia
Date	Match	Venue	Round
3 May 2025	(Saudi Arabia) Al-Ahli – (Japan) Kawasaki Frontale	Jeddah	Final

2026 FIFA World Cup – Canada/United States/Mexico
Date	Match	Venue	Round
17 June 2026	Portugal – DR Congo	Houston	Group Stage
27 June 2026	Panama – England	New York/New Jersey	Group Stage

Preceded by (United States) Jair Marrufo	FIFA Club World Cup Final Referee; 2019	Succeeded by (Uruguay) Esteban Ostojich
Preceded by (United Arab Emirates) Mohammed Abdulla Hassan Mohamed	AFC Cup final match referees 2018 (Qatar) Abdulrahman Al-Jassim	Succeeded by (Sri Lanka) Hettikamkanamge Perera
