= 2018 AFC Champions League final =

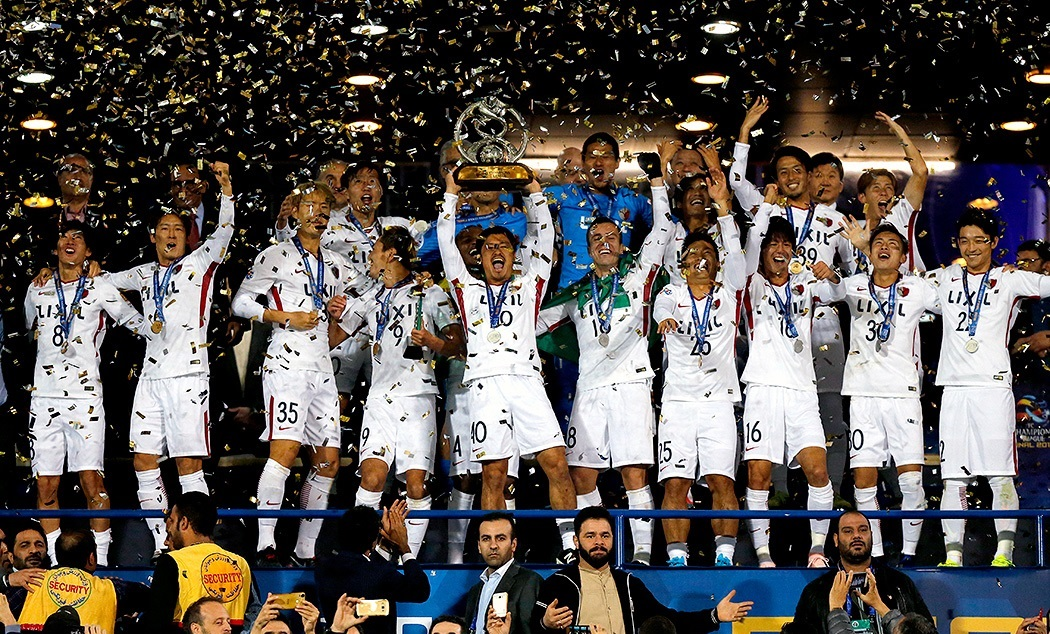
- Event: 2018 AFC Champions League
Kashima Antlers	Persepolis
(Japan)	(Iran)
2	0
- on aggregate

First leg
Kashima Antlers	Persepolis
2	0
- Date: 3 November 2018
- Venue: Kashima Soccer Stadium, Kashima
- Man of the Match: Léo Silva (Kashima Antlers)
- Referee: Ma Ning (China)
- Attendance: 35,022
- Weather: Clear; 15 °C (59 °F)

Second leg
Persepolis	Kashima Antlers
0	0
- Date: 10 November 2018
- Venue: Azadi Stadium, Tehran
- Man of the Match: Godwin Mensha (Persepolis)
- Referee: Ahmed Al-Kaf (Oman)
- Attendance: 100,000
- Weather: Windy; 10 °C (50 °F)

The 2018 AFC Champions League final was the final of the 2018 AFC Champions League, the 37th edition of the top-level Asian club football tournament organized by the Asian Football Confederation (AFC), and the 16th under the current AFC Champions League title.

The final was contested in a two-legged home-and-away format between Kashima Antlers from Japan and Persepolis from Iran, with both teams making their first Champions League final appearances, the first time it happened since 2008. The first leg was hosted by Kashima Antlers at the Kashima Soccer Stadium in Kashima on 3 November 2018, while the second leg was hosted by Persepolis at the Azadi Stadium in Tehran on 10 November 2018. This was the first AFC Champions League final involving an Iranian club since Zob Ahan in 2010, and the first time neither team had won the tournament before since 2013.

Kashima Antlers won the final 2–0 on aggregate for their first AFC Champions League title. As Asian champions, they earned the right to represent the AFC at the 2018 FIFA Club World Cup in the United Arab Emirates, entering at the second round.

== Teams ==
In the following table, finals until 2002 were in the Asian Club Championship era, since 2003 were in the AFC Champions League era.

Team	Region	Previous finals appearances (bold indicates winners)
(Japan) Kashima Antlers	East Region (Zone: EAFF)	None
(Iran) Persepolis	West Region (Zone: CAFA)	None

== Venues ==
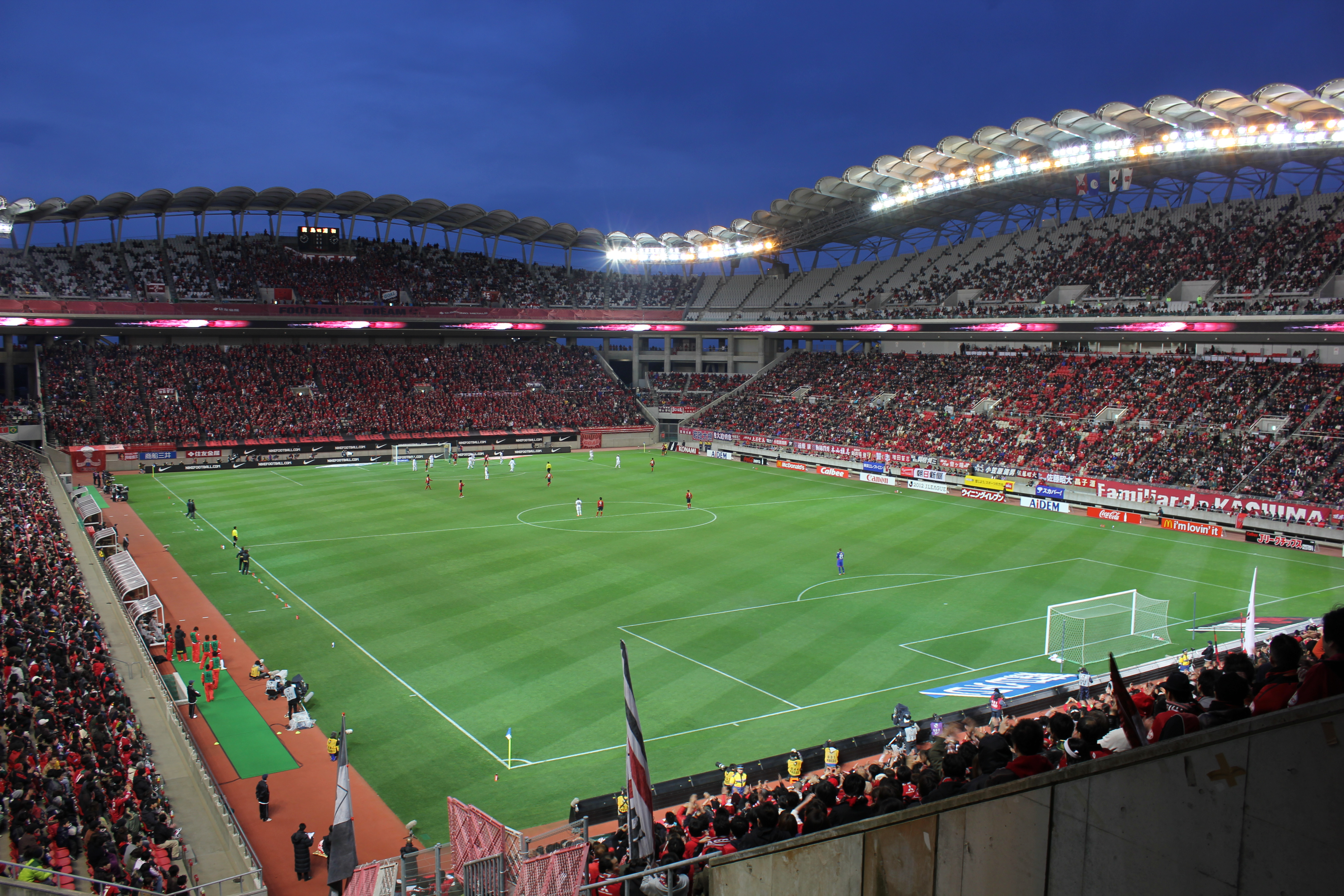
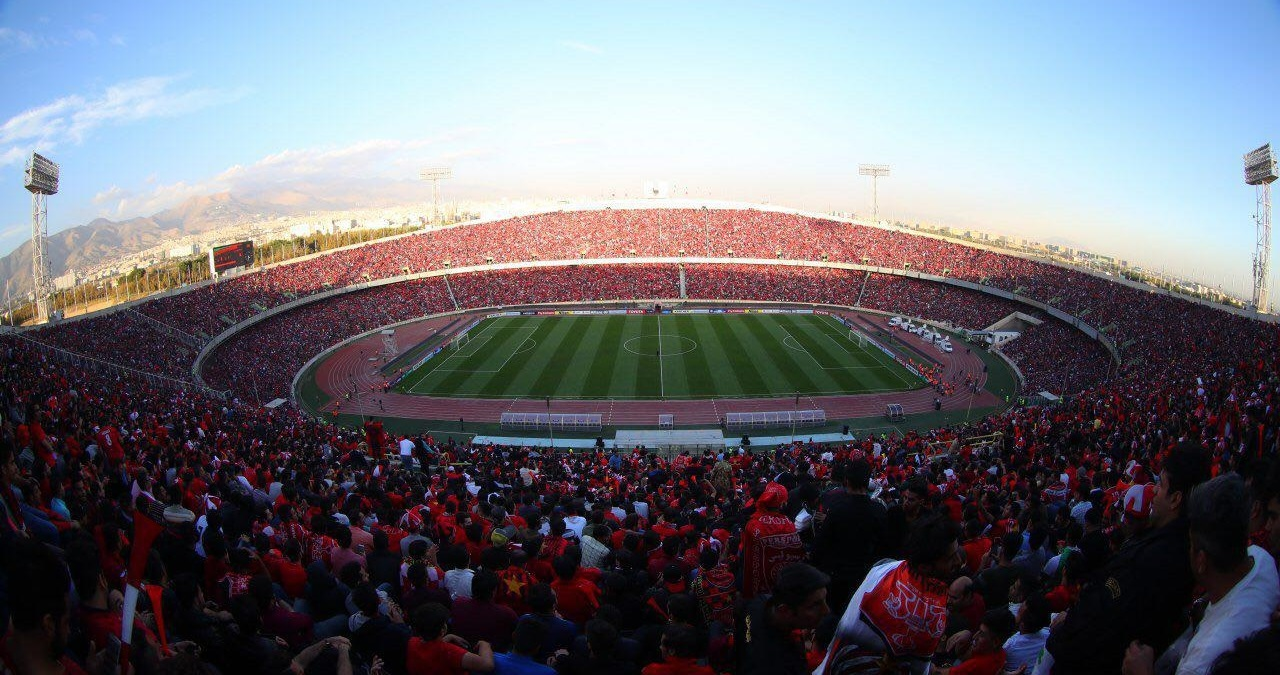
Kashima Soccer Stadium in Kashima, Japan (L) and Azadi Stadium in Tehran, Iran (R)

The 2018 AFC Champions League Final was contested in two-legged home-and-away format, held at the home of both finalists. It is the sixth consecutive year that the AFC adopted such an arrangement. Kashima Antlers's home venue, 40,728 seater Kashima Soccer Stadium hosted the first leg. This was the first time that an Asian club final played in the Kashima Soccer Stadium.

78,116 seater Azadi Stadium hosted the second leg. It is the third time that an Asian club final played in the Azadi Stadium, with the previous final being 1999 and 2002. One of the problems for Azadi's hosting was women's presence at stadium ban, which is runs since 1979. Persepolis officials promised to provide their presence. The stadium also had minor renovations after Persepolis' qualification to the final.

== Background ==
Both Persepolis and Kashima Antlers reached their first final.

Persepolis became the fifth different Iranian side, third in the AFC Champions League era to qualify for the final. It was the first time since 2010 that an Iranian side qualified for the final, Zob Ahan losing 1–3 to Seongnam Ilhwa Chunma of South Korea, that time around. They faced some tough opponents on their road to the final, the highlight being their challengers in the semifinal — Al-Sadd of Qatar who lined up with Barcelona great Xavi in the midfield and former Atlético Madrid legend Gabi manning the defence.

Kashima Antlers became the seventh different Japanese side, third in the AFC Champions League era to qualify for the final. They made consecutive appearances for Japanese clubs in the final, Urawa Red Diamonds winning 2–1 on aggregate against Al-Hilal of Saudi Arabia in the previous edition. They were the runners-up of the 2016 FIFA Club World Cup where they lost 2–4 to the Spanish giants Real Madrid in extra time.

== Road to the final ==
Note: In all results below, the score of the finalist is given first (H: home; A: away).

(Japan) Kashima Antlers				Round	(Iran) Persepolis			
Opponent	Result			Group stage	Opponent	Result		
(China) Shanghai Shenhua	1–1 (H)			Matchday 1	(Uzbekistan) Nasaf Qarshi	3–0 (H)		
(South Korea) Suwon Samsung Bluewings	2–1 (A)			Matchday 2	(Qatar) Al-Sadd	1–3 (A)		
(Australia) Sydney FC	2–0 (A)			Matchday 3	(United Arab Emirates) Al-Wasl	2–0 (H)		
(Australia) Sydney FC	1–1 (H)			Matchday 4	(United Arab Emirates) Al-Wasl	1–0 (A)		
(China) Shanghai Shenhua	2–2 (A)			Matchday 5	(Uzbekistan) Nasaf Qarshi	0–0 (A)		
(South Korea) Suwon Samsung Bluewings	0–1 (H)			Matchday 6	(Qatar) Al-Sadd	1–0 (H)		
**Group H runners-up**: Pos / Team / Pld / Pts; 1 / (South Korea) Suwon Samsung Bluewings / 6 / **10**; **2** / (Japan) Kashima Antlers / **6** / **9**; 3 / (Australia) Sydney FC / 6 / **6**; 4 / (China) Shanghai Shenhua / 6 / **5**; Source: AFC				Final standings	**Group C winners**: Pos / Team / Pld / Pts; **1** / (Iran) Persepolis / **6** / **13**; 2 / (Qatar) Al-Sadd / 6 / **12**; 3 / (Uzbekistan) Nasaf Qarshi / 6 / **10**; 4 / (United Arab Emirates) Al-Wasl / 6 / **0**; Source: AFC			
Opponent	Agg.	1st leg	2nd leg	Knockout stage	Opponent	Agg.	1st leg	2nd leg
(China) Shanghai SIPG	4–3	3–1 (H)	1–2 (A)	Round of 16	(United Arab Emirates) Al-Jazira	4–4 (a)	2–3 (A)	2–1 (H)
(China) Tianjin Quanjian	5–0	2–0 (H)	3–0 (A)	Quarter-finals	(Qatar) Al-Duhail	3–2	0–1 (A)	3–1 (H)
(South Korea) Suwon Samsung Bluewings	6–5	3–2 (H)	3–3 (A)	Semi-finals	(Qatar) Al-Sadd	2–1	1–0 (A)	1–1 (H)

== Format ==
The final was played on a home-and-away two-legged basis, with the order of legs (first leg hosted by team from the East Region, second leg hosted by team from the West Region) reversed from the previous season's final.

The away goals rule, extra time (away goals do not apply in extra time) and penalty shoot-out were used to decide the winner if necessary (Regulations, Section 3. 11.2 & 11.3).

== Officials ==
Ma Ning from China has been chosen to officiate the first leg match. He has been a full international referee for FIFA since 2011. Ahmed Al-Kaf from Oman also officiated the second leg.

== Pre-match ==
=== Ambassador ===
Ambassadors

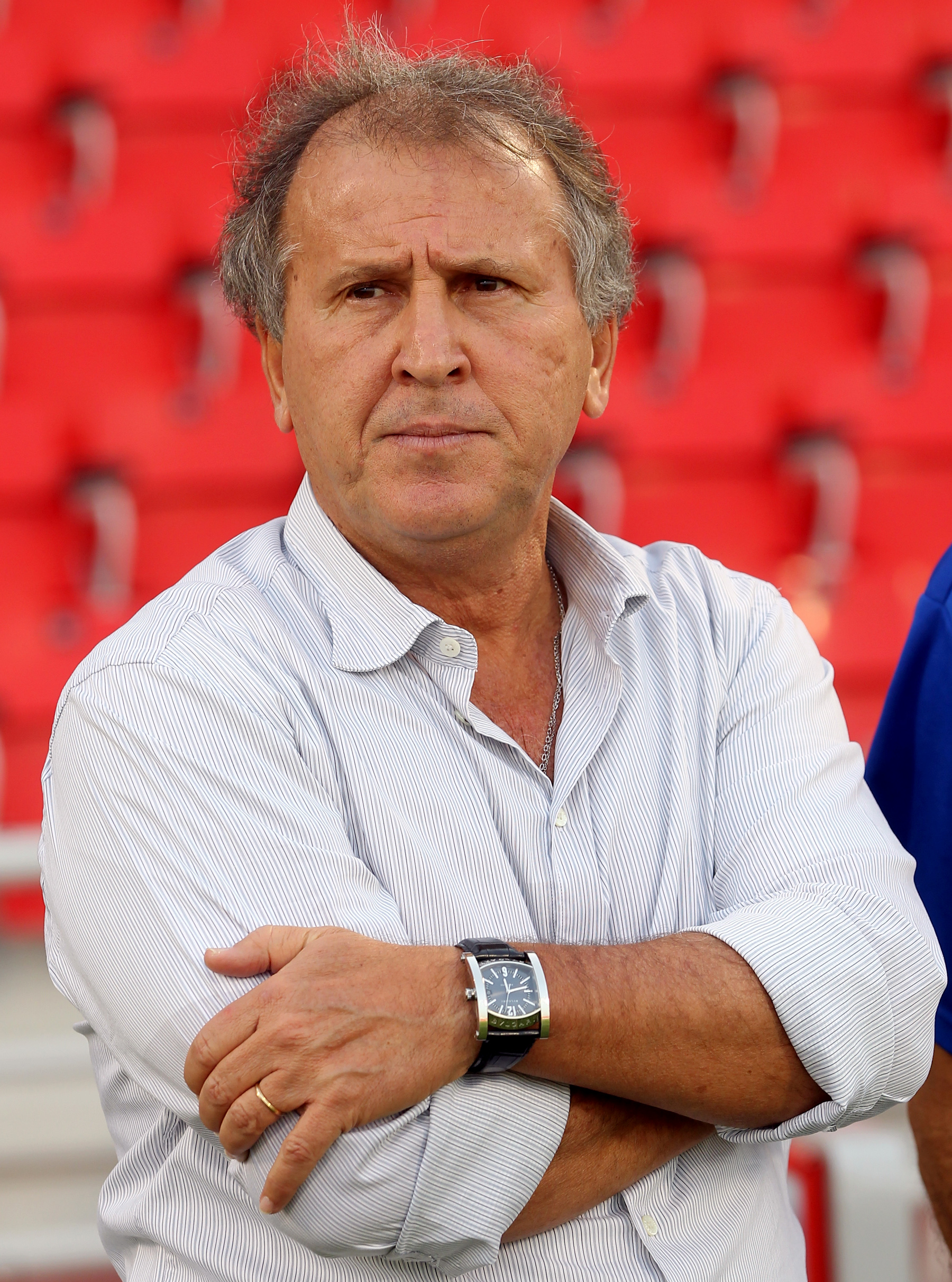
Zico

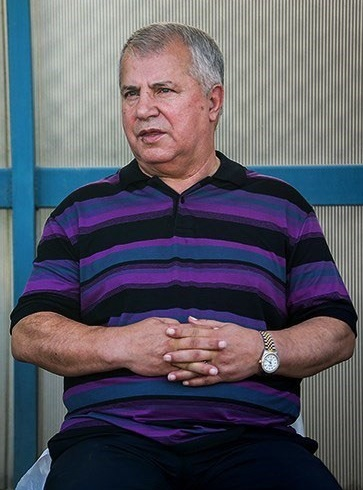
Ali Parvin

The ambassador for the first leg final was former Brazilian footballer and Kashima Antlers legend Zico. Zico is currently technical manager of the team and brought the trophy before the first match. For the second leg, Persepolis announced its legend Ali Parvin as the ambassador.

=== Ticketing ===
With a stadium capacity of 90,000 for the second leg final, a total of 84,412 tickets were available to fans and the general public, with the guest team had 5,000 tickets. The price of the tickets was: 800,000 Rial ($19), 500,000 Rial ($12) and 300,000 Rial ($7).

=== Opening ceremony ===
Iranian singer Mohsen Ebrahimzadeh performed at the opening ceremony preceding the second leg final. The time of concert was 8 minutes and two songs performed. One of the songs was English and the other Persian.

== Matches ==
=== First leg ===
==== Summary ====
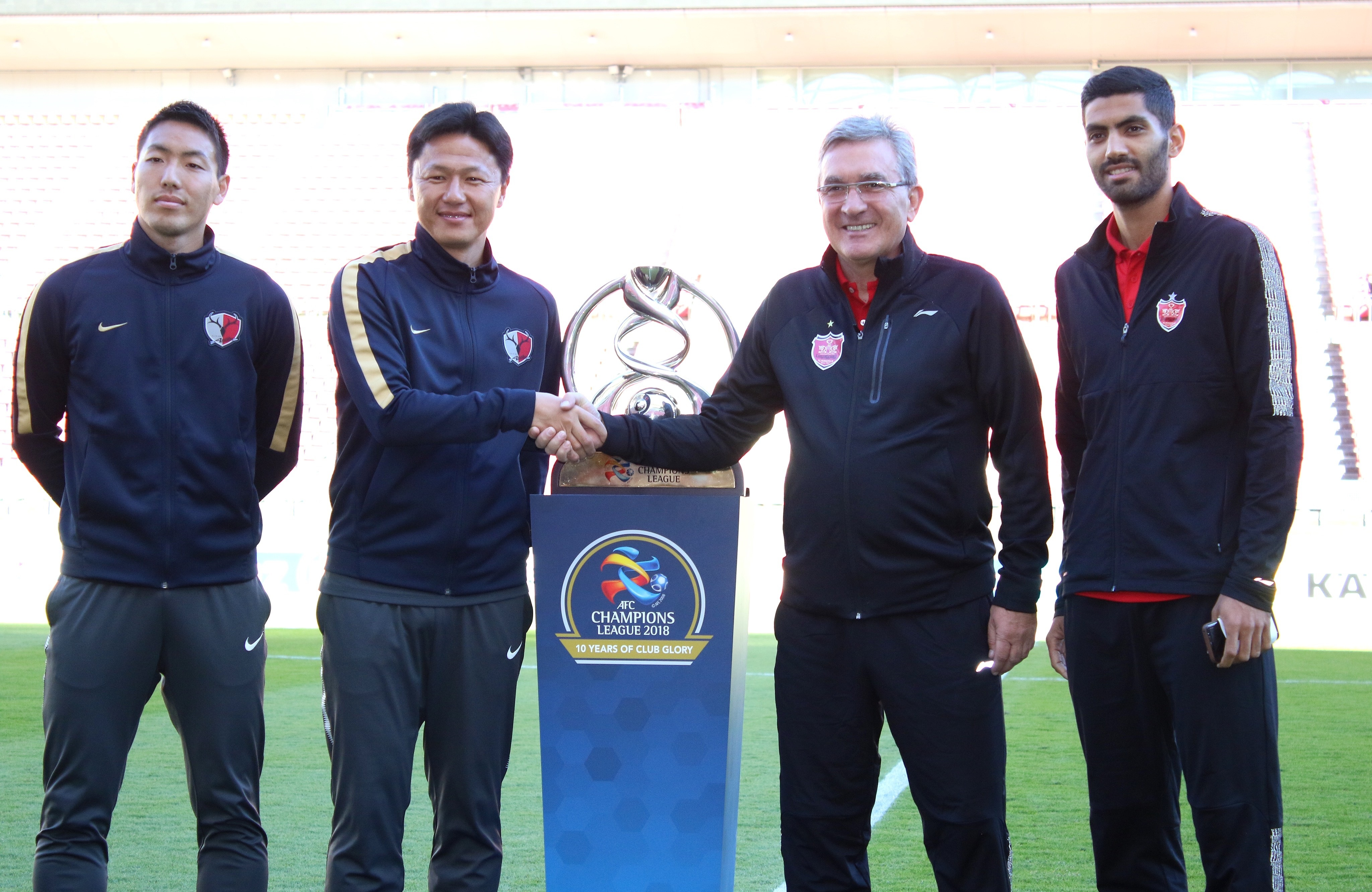
Two teams' coaches before the match

The first big chance fell to the visitors when a cross from the right was nodded into the path of Ali Alipour in the fourth minute. Just eight yards from goal, the striker looked certain to score but Jung Seung-hyun threw himself into the path of the shot and blocked it with his head. Two minutes later, Ahmad Nourollahi's free-kick from the left was tipped over by Kwoun Sun-tae as Persepolis applied early pressure. Kashima worked their way back into the game but the away side's threat on the break was demonstrated when Hiroki Abe was booked for a cynical foul on Bashar Resan as the midfielder surged forward. The hosts finally created an opening in the 25th minute as Daigo Nishi's cushioned header found Yuma Suzuki. But the striker's shot from a narrow angle flashed well wide of the far post. Six minutes later, Kashima had another opportunity when a through ball from Shoma Doi put Serginho through. The Brazilian created an angle for his shot but Shoja' Khalilzadeh slid in to make a vital block.

Kashima made the first chance of the second half when Abe instigated a move that ended with Serginho laying the ball back for Silva. The Brazilian tried to curl a shot into the top corner but his attempt drifted wide. But Silva soon had reason to celebrate as he gave Kashima the lead in the 58th minute. The midfield man played a neat one-two with Shoma on the edge of the Persepolis penalty area and cut inside before curling a low left-footed shot into the corner from 18 yards. Kashima then added their second in the 70th minute. The ball broke to Kento Misao 20 yards out and he played a deft pass into the path of Serginho on the right and the Brazilian placed his shot into the far corner from the edge of the six-yard box. There was a further blow for Persepolis as Siamak Nemati received his second yellow card in added time and the midfielder would miss the second leg.

==== Details ====
3 November 2018
15:00 UTC+9

Kashima Antlers (Japan)	2–0	(Iran) Persepolis
Léo Silva 58'; Serginho 70'	Live Report; Stats Report

Kashima Soccer Stadium, Kashima
Attendance: 35,022
Referee: Ma Ning (China)

**Kashima Antlers**	**Persepolis**

GK	1	(South Korea) Kwoun Sun-tae
RB	22	(Japan) Daigo Nishi
CB	35	(South Korea) Jung Seung-hyun
CB	3	(Japan) Gen Shoji (c)
LB	16	(Japan) Shuto Yamamoto
RM	20	(Japan) Kento Misao
CM	8	(Japan) Shoma Doi		(substituted off) 80'
CM	4	(Brazil) Léo Silva
LM	18	(Brazil) Serginho		(substituted off) 90+2'
CF	9	(Japan) Yuma Suzuki
CF	30	(Japan) Hiroki Abe	(yellow card) 11'	(substituted off) 68'
Substitutes:
GK	21	(Japan) Hitoshi Sogahata
DF	32	(Japan) Koki Anzai		(substituted on) 68'
DF	39	(Japan) Tomoya Inukai
MF	6	(Japan) Ryota Nagaki		(substituted on) 80'
MF	25	(Japan) Yasushi Endo
MF	40	(Japan) Mitsuo Ogasawara
FW	14	(Japan) Takeshi Kanamori		(substituted on) 90+2'
Manager:
(Japan) Go Oiwa

GK	1	(Iran) Alireza Beiranvand
RB	69	(Iran) Shayan Mosleh
CB	4	(Iran) Jalal Hosseini (c)
CB	3	(Iran) Shoja' Khalilzadeh	(yellow card) 72'
LB	15	(Iran) Mohammad Ansari
RM	88	(Iran) Siamak Nemati	(yellow card) 62' (yellow-red card) 90+3'
CM	11	(Iran) Kamal Kamyabinia
CM	5	(Iraq) Bashar Resan
LM	8	(Iran) Ahmad Nourollahi		(substituted off) 70'
CF	70	(Iran) Ali Alipour
CF	90	(Nigeria) Godwin Mensha
Substitutes:
GK	44	(Croatia) Božidar Radošević
MF	18	(Iran) Mohsen Rabiekhah
MF	21	(Canada) Adam Hemati
MF	22	(Iran) Omid Alishah		(substituted on) 70'
MF	25	(Iran) Ehsan Alvanzadeh
MF	26	(Iran) Saeid Hosseinpour
MF	37	(Iran) Hamidreza Taherkhani
Manager:
(Croatia) Branko Ivanković

Man of the Match:
Léo Silva (Kashima Antlers)

Assistant referees:
Cao Yi (China)
Shi Xiang (China)
Fourth official:
Huo Weiming (China)
Additional assistant referees:
Fu Ming (China)
Liu Kwok Man (Hong Kong)

**Match rules**

- 90 minutes.
- Seven named substitutes, of which up to three may be used.

==== Statistics ====
First half
Statistic	Kashima Antlers	Persepolis
Goals scored	0	0
Total shots	4	5
Shots on target	0	1
Passes	185	146
Ball possession	55%	45%

Second half
Statistic	Kashima Antlers	Persepolis
Goals scored	2	0
Total shots	4	2
Shots on target	2	1
Passes	193	168
Ball possession	55%	45%

Overall
Statistic	Kashima Antlers	Persepolis
Goals scored	2	0
Total shots	8	7
Shots on target	2	2
Passes	378	314
Ball possession	55%	45%

=== Second leg ===
External videos
- #ACLFinal 2018 Relive - Persepolis FC (IRN) vs Kashima Antlers (JPN) (Azadi Stadium) on YouTube

==== Summary ====
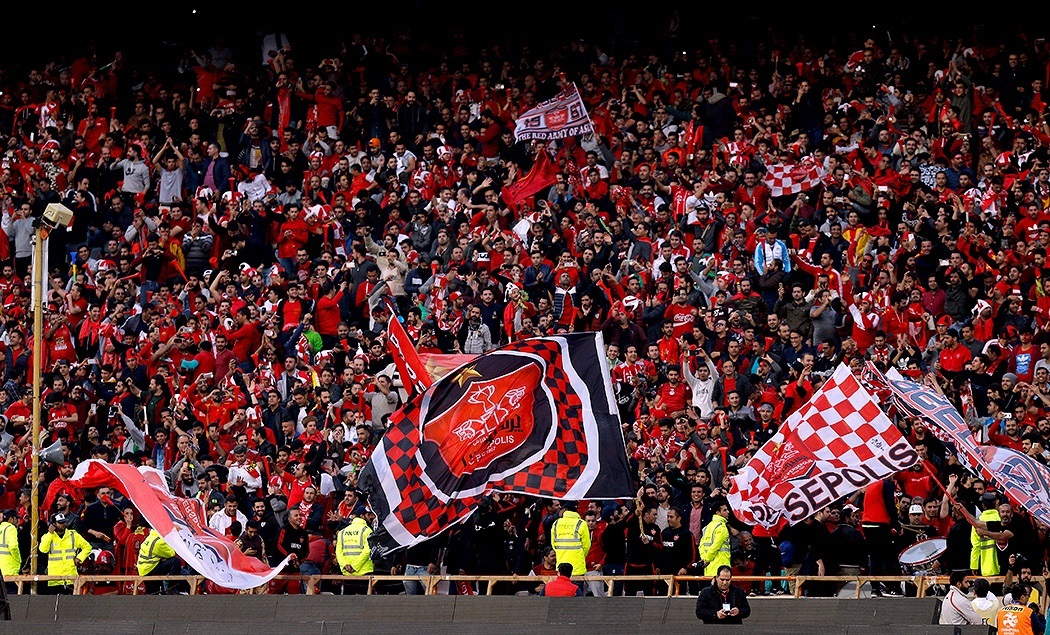
Persepolis fans during the match

Persepolis, known for their mean defence, had no option but to attack, but Kashima goalkeeper Kwoun Sun-tae put in a virtuoso performance. Kwoun, for whom this was a third Asian crown following two with South Korea's Jeonbuk Hyundai Motors, was at the top of his game, keeping the Iranians, especially Ali Alipour and Bashar Resan at bay. Seven minutes before half-time Resan muscled his way past two defenders close to the Kashima goal, but failed to beat Kwoun at his near post.

Persepolis coach Branko Ivankovic sent on Mohsen Rabiekhah and Ehsan Alvanzadeh in a desperate attempt to break the deadlock but to no avail. After winning the home leg 2–0, the Japanese team held Persepolis to a goalless stalemate in Iran to clinch their first-ever title in the tournament.

==== Details ====
10 November 2018
18:30 UTC+3:30

Persepolis (Iran)	0–0	(Japan) Kashima Antlers
	Live Report; Stats Report

Azadi Stadium, Tehran
Attendance: 100,000
Referee: Ahmed Al-Kaf (Oman)

**Persepolis**	**Kashima Antlers**

GK	1	(Iran) Alireza Beiranvand
RB	3	(Iran) Shoja' Khalilzadeh
CB	4	(Iran) Jalal Hosseini (c)
CB	15	(Iran) Mohammad Ansari	(substituted off) 69'
LB	69	(Iran) Shayan Mosleh
DM	11	(Iran) Kamal Kamyabinia
CM	21	(Canada) Adam Hemati	(substituted off) 64'
CM	8	(Iran) Ahmad Nourollahi
AM	5	(Iraq) Bashar Resan
CF	70	(Iran) Ali Alipour
CF	90	(Nigeria) Godwin Mensha
Substitutes:
GK	12	(Iran) Abolfazl Darvishvand
GK	44	(Croatia) Božidar Radošević
DF	38	(Iran) Ehsan Hosseini
MF	18	(Iran) Mohsen Rabiekhah	(substituted on) 64'
MF	25	(Iran) Ehsan Alvanzadeh	(substituted on) 69'
MF	26	(Iran) Saeid Hosseinpour
MF	37	(Iran) Hamidreza Taherkhani
Manager:
(Croatia) Branko Ivanković

GK	1	(South Korea) Kwoun Sun-tae
RB	22	(Japan) Daigo Nishi	(yellow card) 70'
CB	35	(South Korea) Jung Seung-hyun
CB	3	(Japan) Gen Shoji (c)
LB	16	(Japan) Shuto Yamamoto
RM	8	(Japan) Shoma Doi		(substituted off) 68'
CM	20	(Japan) Kento Misao
CM	4	(Brazil) Léo Silva	(yellow card) 43'
LM	30	(Japan) Hiroki Abe		(substituted off) 90+3'
CF	18	(Brazil) Serginho
CF	9	(Japan) Yuma Suzuki		(substituted off) 77'
Substitutes:
GK	21	(Japan) Hitoshi Sogahata
DF	32	(Japan) Koki Anzai		(substituted on) 68'
DF	39	(Japan) Tomoya Inukai
MF	6	(Japan) Ryota Nagaki	(yellow card) 90+1'	(substituted on) 77'
MF	25	(Japan) Yasushi Endo
MF	40	(Japan) Mitsuo Ogasawara
FW	14	(Japan) Takeshi Kanamori		(substituted on) 90+3'
Manager:
(Japan) Go Oiwa

Man of the Match:
Godwin Mensha (Persepolis)

Assistant referees:
Abu Bakar Al-Amri (Oman)
Rashid Al-Ghaithi (Oman)
Fourth official:
Ronnie Koh Min Kiat (Singapore)
Additional assistant referees:
Muhammad Taqi (Singapore)
Adham Makhadmeh (Jordan)

**Match rules**

- 90 minutes.
- 30 minutes of extra time if tied on aggregate and away goals.
- Penalty shoot-out if still tied after extra time (no away goals rule applied).
- Seven named substitutes, of which up to three may be used.

==== Statistics ====
First half
Statistic	Persepolis	Kashima Antlers
Goals scored	0	0
Total shots	9	6
Shots on target	5	0
Passes	221	162
Ball possession	58%	42%

Second half
Statistic	Persepolis	Kashima Antlers
Goals scored	0	0
Total shots	8	1
Shots on target	1	0
Passes	238	123
Ball possession	62%	38%

Overall
Statistic	Persepolis	Kashima Antlers
Goals scored	0	0
Total shots	17	7
Shots on target	6	0
Passes	459	285
Ball possession	62%	38%

== Incidents ==
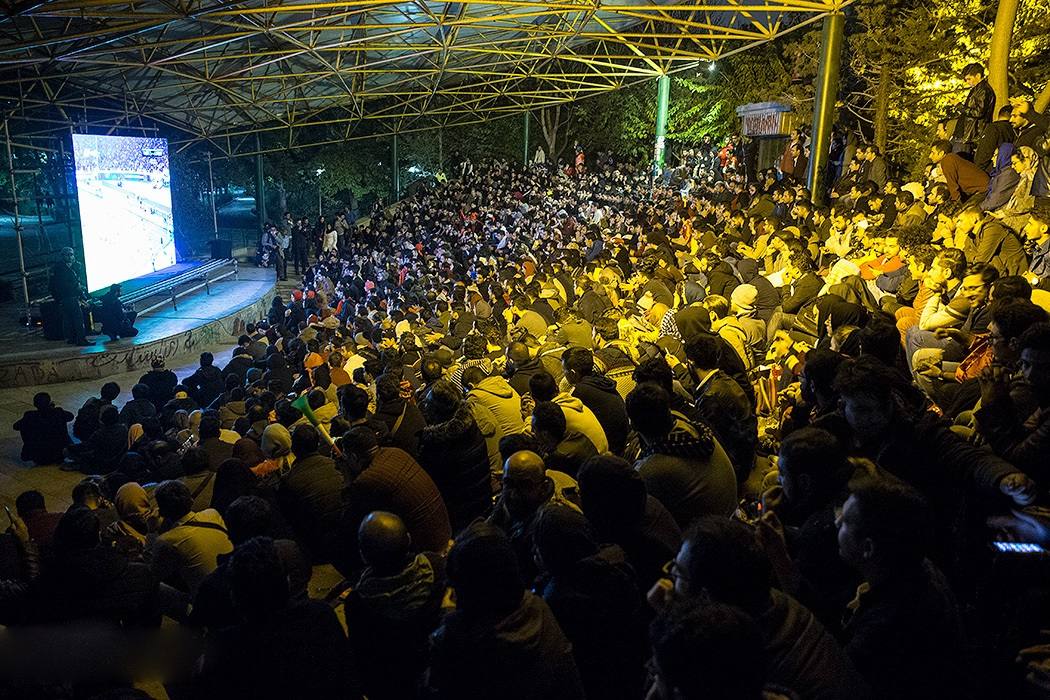
People watching match at Tehran's Laleh Park

An Iranian pitch invader skipped to the ground in the 21st minute of the match in Japan. He brought an Iranian Empire flag, which now symbolizes the opposition and was also wearing a shirt with the image of Abdolfattah Soltani, a controversial Iranian judge.

Hundreds of Iranian women were allowed to attend the second leg; Iranian female fans had been barred from attending official matches in Iran since the Iranian Revolution.

== See also ==
- 2018 AFC Cup Final
