= Katsuya Iwatake =

Japanese footballer

Personal information
- Full name: Katsuya Iwatake
- Date of birth: June 4, 1996 (age 30)
- Place of birth: Oita, Japan
- Height: 1.73 m (5 ft 8 in)
- Position: Defender

Team information
- Current team: Yokohama FC
- Number: 22

Youth career
- –2011: Catiolla FC
- 2012–2014: Oita Trinita

College career
Years	Team	Apps	(Gls)
2015–2018	Meiji University		

Senior career*
Years	Team	Apps	(Gls)
2014	Oita Trinita	10	(0)
2019–2020	Urawa Red Diamonds	14	(0)
2021–	Yokohama FC	128	(6)
- * Club domestic league appearances and goals as of 14 August 2026

Katsuya Iwatake (岩武 克弥, Iwatake Katsuya; born June 4, 1996) is a Japanese footballer for J2 League club Yokohama FC.

== Playing career ==
Katsuya Iwatake played for the J2 League club Oita Trinita in 2014.

== Club statistics ==
Last Update:20 February 2019

Club performance			League		Cup		League Cup		Total	
Season	Club	League	Apps	Goals	Apps	Goals	Apps	Goals	Apps	Goals
Japan			League		Emperor's Cup		J.League Cup		Total	
2014	Oita Trinita	J2 League	10	0	1	0	-		11	0
2018	Urawa Red Diamonds	J1 League	0	0	0	0	0	0	0	0
Career total			10	0	1	0	0	0	11	0
