= Tsuyoshi Otsuki =

Japanese footballer and manager

Tsuyoshi Otsuki 大槻 毅
Personal information
- Full name: Tsuyoshi Otsuki
- Date of birth: December 1, 1972 (age 53)
- Place of birth: Sendai, Miyagi, Japan

Team information
- Current team: Thespa Gunma (manager)

Youth career
- Sendai Daini High School
- University of Tsukuba

Senior career*
Years	Team	Apps	(Gls)
- Sony Sendai

Managerial career
- 2018: Urawa Red Diamonds
- 2019–2020: Urawa Red Diamonds
- 2022–2024: Thespa Gunma
- * Club domestic league appearances and goals

Tsuyoshi Otsuki (大槻 毅, Otsuki Tsuyoshi; born December 1, 1972) is a former Japanese football player and manager. He was most recently manager of J2 League club Thespa Gunma.

== Playing career ==
Otsuki was born in Sendai on December 1, 1972. After graduating from University of Tsukuba, he played for his local club Sony Sendai.

== Coaching career ==
After retiring players career, Otsuki became J.League club coach. (Mito HollyHock (2000-2002), Omiya Ardija (2003), Urawa Reds (2004-2010) and Vegalta Sendai (2011)) In 2012, he returned Urawa Reds. On April 2, 2018, team manager Takafumi Hori was sacked. Otsuki became manager. On April 22, the club contracted with Oswaldo de Oliveira. So, Otsuki became assistant coach. In May 2019, manager Oliveira was sacked and Otsuki became a manager again.

On 16 December 2021, Otsuki announcement officially appointment manager of Thespakusatsu Gunma (now Thespa Gunma) from 2022 season.

Following a poor start to the 2024 season with 10 losses in their first 14 games, Otsuki was dismissed in May 2024.

== Managerial statistics ==
As of the start from 2024 season.

Team	From	To	Record				
Team	From	To	G	W	D	L	Win %
Urawa Reds	2018		6	4	2	0	66.67
Urawa Reds	2019		70	23	18	29	32.86
Thespa Gunma	2022	2024	88	27	24	37	30.68
Total			164	54	44	66	32.93
