= Adham Makhadmeh =

Jordanian football referee (born 1987)

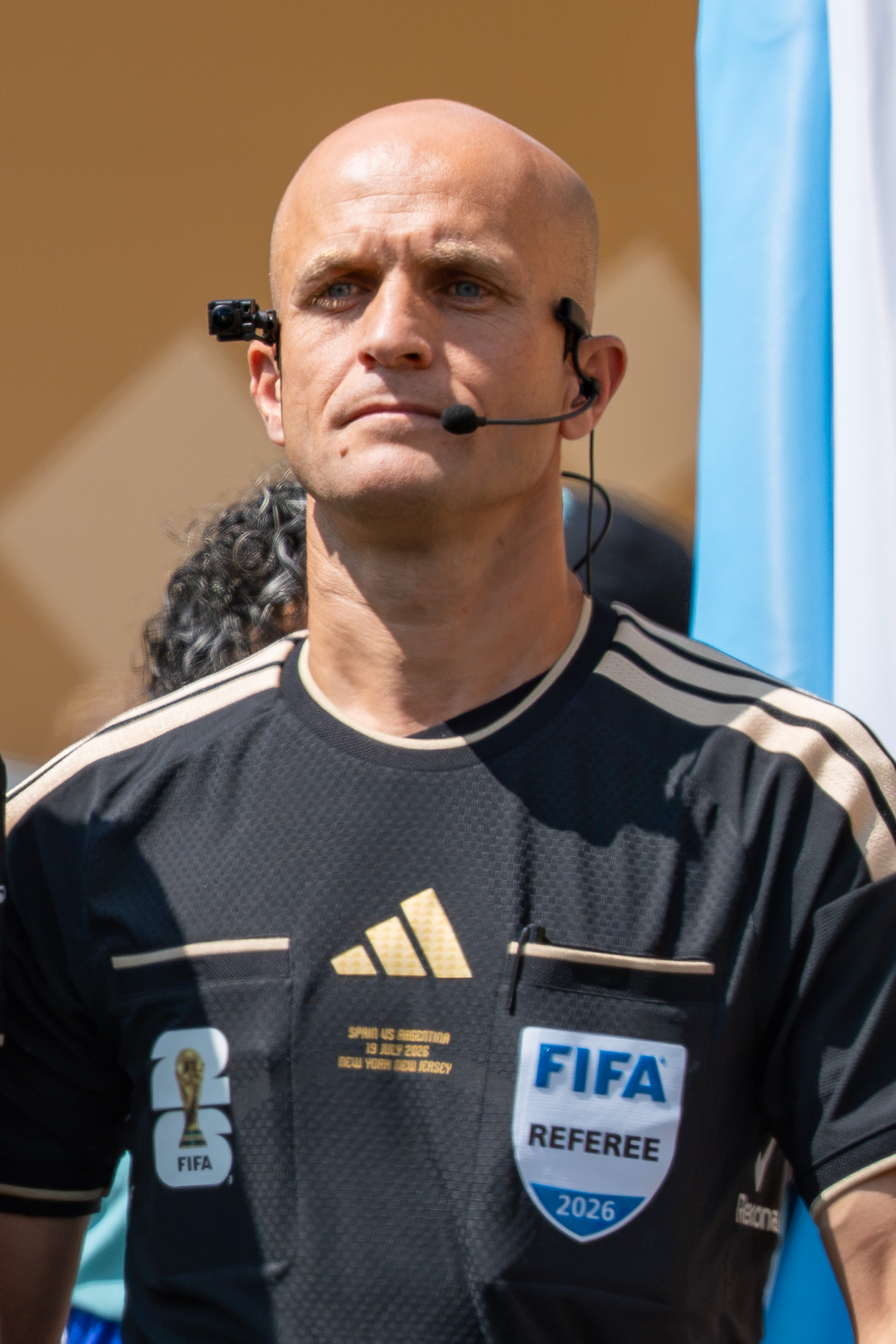
- Makhadmeh during the 2026 FIFA World Cup final
- Full name: Adham Mohammad Tumah Makhadmeh
- Born: 13 February 1987 (age 39); Irbid, Jordan

International
Years	League	Role
2013–	FIFA	Referee

Adham Mohammad Tumah Makhadmeh (Arabic: أدهم المخادمة; born 13 February 1987) is a Jordanian football referee who has been a full international referee for FIFA since 2013. He refereed the first leg of the 2017 AFC Champions League final, and was the 4th official for the 2026 World Cup Final.

As of 2026, in addition to his refereeing career, he also works as Resident Engineer at the West Irbid Wastewater Network Project with Jordanian consulting company Engicon.

== Early life ==
Adham Makhadmeh was born in Irbid, in 1987, to a Jordanian father and a Bosnian mother. His parents met while his father was studying in Sarajevo, before moving to Jordan in 1974. His father was a civil engineer, and his mother a gymnastics athlete. Makhadmeh also holds a Bosnian passport, and has eight siblings–five brothers and three sisters.

In his hometown of Irbid in the 1990s, Adham had been committed to Islamic prayer since a young age, calling the adhan for worshippers at his local mosque, and even leading them in prayer. His maternal grandfather had likewise served as the Sheikh of a Sarajevo mosque, who was killed during the Bosnian War in 1992 when a shell hit his mosque.

When one of Adham's sisters, Nuhad, started studying sport's education at the Yarmouk University in 2002, he accompanied her during her travel to Amman to attend refereeing courses for five months. After her accreditation in November 2002, she started participating in tournaments such as the Amman Club, the Orthodox Club, and the Jordan Youth Club, during which Adham would accompany her as well. Nuhad attributes Adham's early interest in refereeing due to his recurring trips with her. Adham then enrolled in a refereeing course in 2004, after which he was accredited as a referee by the Jordan Football Association in 2005 at the age of 18.

In addition to his refereeing career, Makhadmeh graduated from the Jordan University of Science and Technology with a bachelor's degree in civil engineering in 2010. As of 2026, he also works as a Resident Engineer at the West Irbid Wastewater Network Project with Engicon, an Amman-based engineering firm.

== Career ==
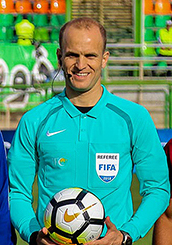
Makhadmeh at the 2018 AFC Champions League

Makhadmeh started his sports career as an assistant referee for the Jordan Football Association in 2007, and afterwards served as a main referee for the first time in a match between Wehdat and Yarmouk football clubs. Since then, he had aspired to join the FIFA World Cup as a referee, accordingly joining several referee training courses. Makhadmeh was awarded a FIFA international refereeing badge in 2013, upon reaching the minimum eligible age of 25.

By 2014, the Asian Football Confederation (AFC) had designated him as an elite referee, which later allowed him to referee the first leg of the 2017 AFC Champions League final between Al Hilal SFC and Urawa Red Diamonds. Makhadmeh and a Jordanian refereeing team competed for one of Asia's six refereeing spots for the 2022 FIFA World Cup, but came in seventh place. He then refereed the opening match of the 2020 Summer Olympics in Tokyo, and some matches of the 2025 FIFA Club World Cup.

In April 2026, Makhadmeh was appointed to the 2026 FIFA World Cup in North America, serving alongside two fellow Jordanian assistant referees. He oversaw his first game in the tournament on 15 June in the Group H match between Spain and Cape Verde. He was selected as the 4th official for the final.

== Personal life ==
Makhadmeh is married and has three sons and a daughter. He enjoys being in nature, and hunting as a sport.

== Selected international matches refereed ==
2023 AFC Asian Cup – Qatar
Date	Match	Venue	Location	Round	Result	Yellow cards	Red cards
14 June 2021	Thailand – Kyrgyzstan	Abdullah bin Khalifa Stadium	Doha	Group F	2–0	5	0
2025 FIFA Arab Cup – Qatar
2 December 2025	Saudi Arabia – Oman	Education City Stadium	Al Rayyan	Group B	2–1	0	0
6 December 2025	Sudan – Iraq	Stadium 974	Doha	Group D	0–2	4	0
12 December 2025	Algeria – United Arab Emirates	Al Bayt Stadium	Al Khor	Quarter-finals	1–1 (a.e.t); 6–7 (PK)	4	1
2026 FIFA World Cup – Canada/ Mexico/ United States
15 June 2026	Spain – Cape Verde	Mercedes-Benz Stadium	Atlanta	Group H	0–0	2	0
26 June 2026	New Zealand – Belgium	BC Place	Vancouver	Group G	1–5	2	0
1 July 2026	England – DR Congo	Mercedes-Benz Stadium	Atlanta	Round of 32	2–1	2	0
6 July 2026	United States – Belgium	Lumen Field	Seattle	Round of 16	1–4	2	0

== Major club matches refereed ==
Date	Match	Tournament	Venue	Result
18 November 2017	Al Hilal vs. Urawa Red Diamonds	2017 AFC Champions League final first leg	King Fahd Sports City Stadium, Riyadh	1–1
