= Fabrício (footballer, born March 1990) =

Brazilian footballer

Personal information
- Full name: Fabrício dos Santos Messias
- Date of birth: 28 March 1990 (age 36)
- Place of birth: Hortolândia, Brazil
- Height: 1.83 m (6 ft 0 in)
- Position: Forward

Team information
- Current team: Democrata

Youth career
- Guarani
- Roma
- Udinese
- Mentrisi
- 2007–2008: Campinas
- 2008: Corinthians

Senior career*
Years	Team	Apps	(Gls)
2009–2010	Corinthians		
2009	→ Capivariano (loan)		
2009	→ Ituano (loan)		
2010	→ Juventude (loan)		
2011	Botafogo	0	(0)
2011–2018	Portimonense	166	(40)
2012	→ Hangzhou Greentown (loan)	25	(3)
2016	→ Kashima Antlers (loan)	10	(1)
2018–2021	Urawa Red Diamonds	25	(8)
2020–2021	→ Portimonense (loan)	28	(4)
2021–2022	Portimonense	26	(1)
2022–2023	Guangxi Pingguo Haliao	20	(5)
2025	Juventus-SP		
2025-	Democrata-SL	0	(0)
- * Club domestic league appearances and goals as of 5 November 2023

Fabrício dos Santos Messias (born 28 March 1990), or simply Fabrício, is a Brazilian football player

== Club career ==
Fabrício started his career in Corinthians and was loaned to Capivariano, Ituano and Juventude to gain experience. Fabrício transferred to Botafogo in 2011. He transferred to Portuguese Liga de Honra club Portimonense in July. Fabrício made his debut for Portimonense on 21 August, in a 2-0 away league victory against Moreirense. He scored his first and the only goal for the Portuguese club in the second round of Taça de Portugal which Portimonense beat Sourense 3-0. Fabrício moved to Chinese Super League side Hangzhou Greentown in January 2012 on a loan deal.

== Career statistics ==
As of 5 November 2023

Appearances and goals by club, season and competition
Club	Season	League			Cup		League Cup		Continental		Other		Total	
Club	Season	Division	Apps	Goals	Apps	Goals	Apps	Goals	Apps	Goals	Apps	Goals	Apps	Goals
Juventude	2010	Campeonato Brasileiro Série C	0	0	1	0	0	0	-		1 (Note: Appearance in Campeonato Gaúcho)	1	2	1
Botafogo	2011	Campeonato Brasileiro Série A	0	0	1	0	0	0	-		2 (Note: Appearances in Campeonato Carioca)	0	3	0
Portimonense	2011–12	Liga de Honra	13	0	0	0	3	0	-		-		16	0
Portimonense	2012–13	Segunda Liga	11	2	0	0	0	0	-		-		11	2
Portimonense	2013–14	Segunda Liga	23	4	0	0	1	0	-		-		24	4
Portimonense	2014–15	Segunda Liga	37	6	0	0	3	0	-		-		40	6
Portimonense	2015–16	LigaPro	41	9	2	1	5	3	-		-		48	13
Portimonense	2016–17	LigaPro	12	4	0	0	0	0	-		-		12	4
Portimonense	2017–18	Primeira Liga	29	15	1	0	3	1	-		-		33	16
Portimonense	Total		166	40	3	1	15	4	0	0	0	0	184	45
Zhejiang Greentown (loan)	2012	Chinese Super League	25	3	0	0	0	0	-		-		25	3
Kashima Antlers (loan)	2016	J1 League	8	1	6	3	0	0	-		3 (Note: Two Appearances in FIFA Club World Cup, One Appearance in Suruga Bank Championship)	0	17	4
Urawa Red Diamonds	2018	J1 League	9	6	1	1	0	0	-		-		10	7
Urawa Red Diamonds	2019	J1 League	14	2	1	2	2	0	8	1	-		25	5
Urawa Red Diamonds	2020	J1 League	2	0	-		0	0	-		-		2	0
Urawa Red Diamonds	Total		25	8	2	3	2	0	8	1	0	0	37	12
Portimonense (loan)	2020–21	Primeira Liga	28	4	1	0	-		-		-		29	4
Portimonense	2021–22	Primeira Liga	26	1	4	0	1	0	-		-		31	1
Guangxi Pingguo Haliao	2022	China League One	2	1	0	0	-		-		-		2	1
Guangxi Pingguo Haliao	2023	China League One	18	4	0	0	-		-		-		18	4
Guangxi Pingguo Haliao	Total		20	5	0	0	0	0	0	0	0	0	20	5
Career totals			298	62	16	7	18	4	8	1	6	1	346	75
