= 2017 AFC Champions League final =

- Event: 2017 AFC Champions League
Al-Hilal	Urawa Red Diamonds
(Saudi Arabia)	(Japan)
1	2
- on aggregate

First leg
Al-Hilal	Urawa Red Diamonds
1	1
- Date: 18 November 2017
- Venue: King Fahd International Stadium, Riyadh
- Man of the Match: Shusaku Nishikawa (Urawa Red Diamonds)
- Referee: Adham Makhadmeh (Jordan)
- Attendance: 59,136
- Weather: Fine and dry 22 °C (72 °F)

Second leg
Urawa Red Diamonds	Al-Hilal
1	0
- Date: 25 November 2017
- Venue: Saitama Stadium 2002, Saitama
- Man of the Match: Rafael Silva (Urawa Red Diamonds)
- Referee: Ravshan Irmatov (Uzbekistan)
- Attendance: 57,727
- Weather: Cold; 10 °C (50 °F)

The 2017 AFC Champions League final was the final of the 2017 AFC Champions League, the 36th edition of the top-level Asian club football tournament organized by the Asian Football Confederation (AFC), and the 15th under the current AFC Champions League title.

The final was contested in two-legged home-and-away format between Saudi Arabian team Al-Hilal and Japanese team Urawa Red Diamonds. This was the first AFC Champions League final involving a Japanese club since Gamba Osaka in 2008. The first leg was hosted by Al-Hilal at the King Fahd International Stadium in Riyadh on 18 November 2017, while the second leg was hosted by Urawa Red Diamonds at the Saitama Stadium 2002 in Saitama on 25 November 2017.

After the first leg ended in a 1–1 draw, Urawa Red Diamonds defeated Al-Hilal 1–0 in the second leg to win 2–1 on aggregate, and were crowned AFC Champions League champions for the second time.

As Asian champions, Urawa Red Diamonds earned the right to represent the AFC at the 2017 FIFA Club World Cup in the United Arab Emirates, entering at the second round.

== Teams ==
In the following table, finals until 2002 were in the Asian Club Championship era, since 2003 were in the AFC Champions League era.

Team	Region	Previous finals appearances (bold indicates winners)
(Saudi Arabia) Al-Hilal	West Region (Zone: WAFF)	5 (1986, 1987, **1991**, **2000**, 2014)
(Japan) Urawa Red Diamonds	East Region (Zone: EAFF)	1 (**2007**)

Notes

1. The 1986 final was played in four-team round-robin format, with Al-Hilal finishing as runners-up.
2. Al-Hilal was unable to participate in the 1987 final and therefore was declared as runners-up.

== Venues ==
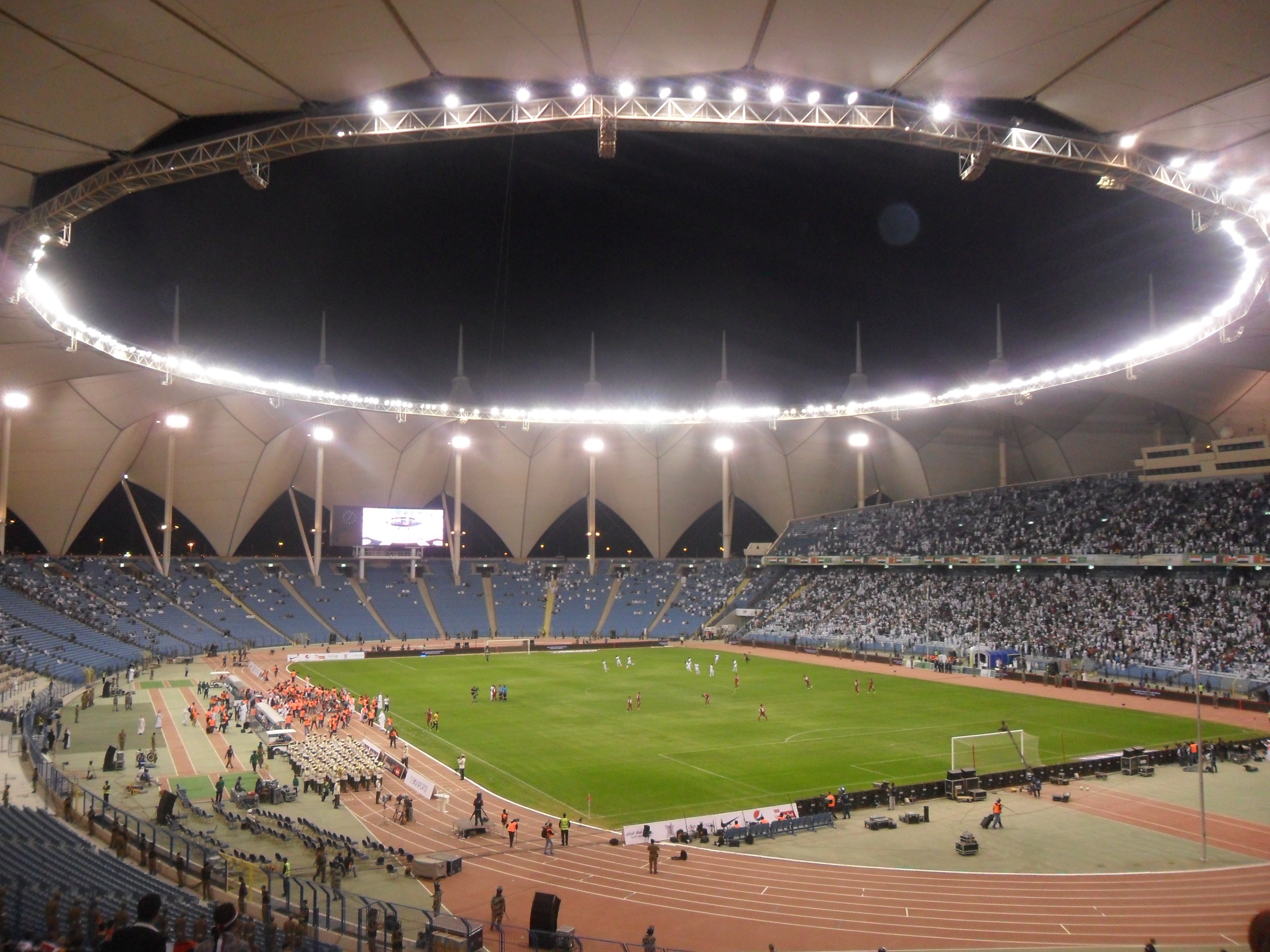
King Fahd International Stadium in Riyadh, Saudi Arabia, hosted the first leg.

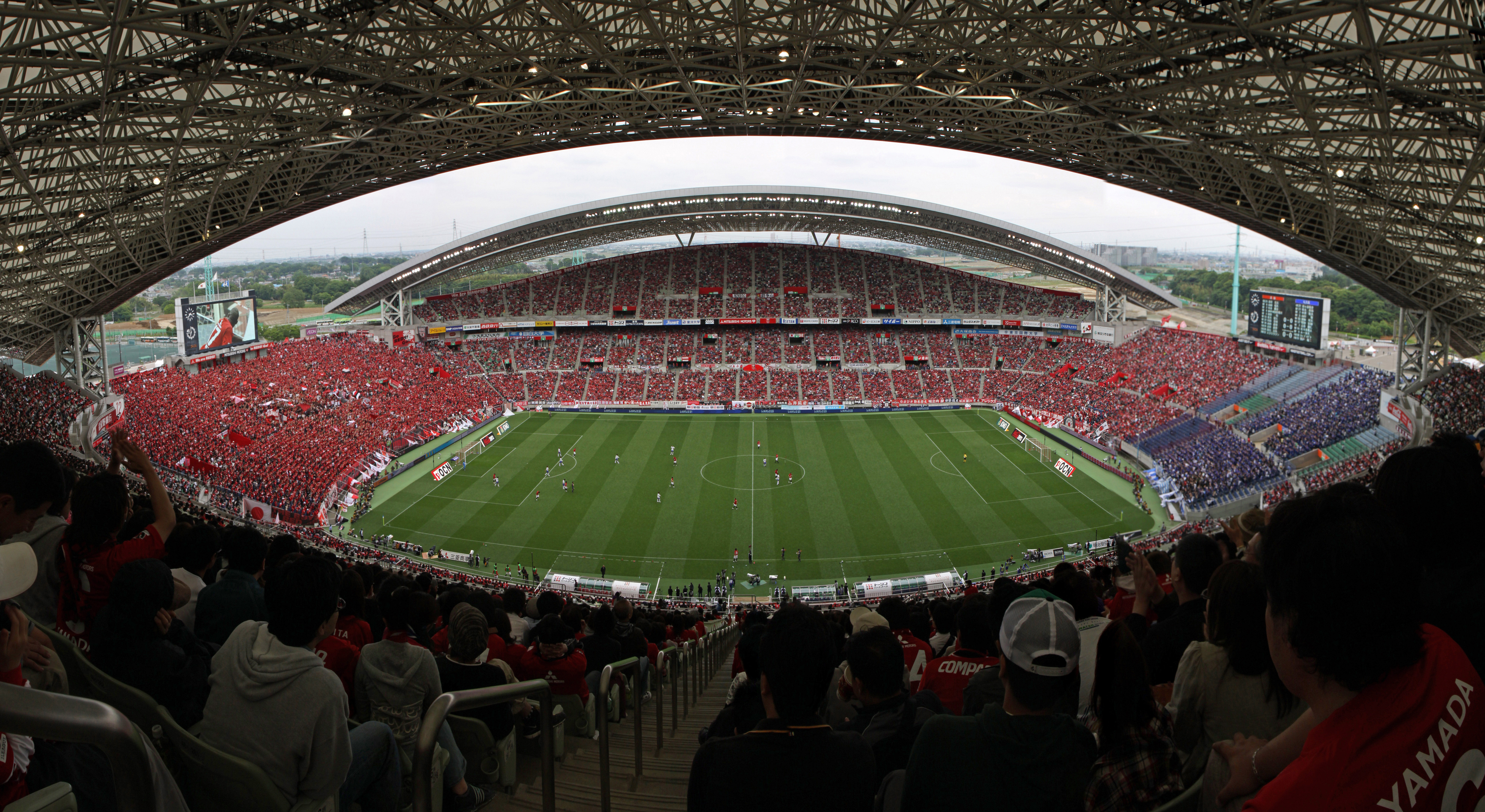
Saitama Stadium 2002 in Saitama, Japan, hosted the second leg.

This was the fourth time that an Asian club final was played in the King Fahd International Stadium, with the previous finals being 1995, 2000, and 2014 (second leg).

This was the second time that an Asian club final was played in the Saitama Stadium 2002, with the previous final being 2007 (second leg).

== Road to the final ==
Note: In all results below, the score of the finalist is given first (H: home; A: away).

(Saudi Arabia) Al-Hilal				Round	(Japan) Urawa Red Diamonds			
Opponent	Result			Group stage	Opponent	Result		
(Iran) Persepolis	1–1 (A)			Matchday 1	(Australia) Western Sydney Wanderers	4–0 (A)		
(Qatar) Al-Rayyan	2–1 (H)			Matchday 2	(South Korea) FC Seoul	5–2 (H)		
(United Arab Emirates) Al-Wahda	2–2 (A)			Matchday 3	(China) Shanghai SIPG	2–3 (A)		
(United Arab Emirates) Al-Wahda	1–0 (H)			Matchday 4	(China) Shanghai SIPG	1–0 (H)		
(Iran) Persepolis	0–0 (H)			Matchday 5	(Australia) Western Sydney Wanderers	6–1 (H)		
(Qatar) Al-Rayyan	4–3 (A)			Matchday 6	(South Korea) FC Seoul	0–1 (A)		
**Group D winners**: Pos / Team / Pld / Pts; **1** / (Saudi Arabia) Al-Hilal / **6** / **12**; 2 / (Iran) Persepolis / 6 / **9**; 3 / (Qatar) Al-Rayyan / 6 / **7**; 4 / (United Arab Emirates) Al-Wahda / 6 / **4**; Source: AFC				Final standings	**Group F winners**: Pos / Team / Pld / Pts; **1** / (Japan) Urawa Red Diamonds / **6** / **12**; 2 / (China) Shanghai SIPG / 6 / **12**; 3 / (South Korea) FC Seoul / 6 / **6**; 4 / (Australia) Western Sydney Wanderers / 6 / **6**; Source: AFC			
Opponent	Agg.	1st leg	2nd leg	Knockout stage	Opponent	Agg.	1st leg	2nd leg
(Iran) Esteghlal Khuzestan	4–2	2–1 (A)	2–1 (H)	Round of 16	(South Korea) Jeju United	3–2	0–2 (A)	3–0 (a.e.t.) (H)
(United Arab Emirates) Al-Ain	3–0	0–0 (A)	3–0 (H)	Quarter-finals	(Japan) Kawasaki Frontale	5–4	1–3 (A)	4–1 (H)
(Iran) Persepolis	6–2	4–0 (H)	2–2 (A)	Semi-finals	(China) Shanghai SIPG	2–1	1–1 (A)	1–0 (H)

== Format ==
The final was played on a home-and-away two-legged basis, with the order of legs (first leg hosted by team from the West Region, second leg hosted by team from the East Region) reversed from the previous season's final. The away goals rule, extra time (away goals do not apply in extra time) and penalty shoot-out would be used to decide the winner if necessary (Regulations, Section 3. 11.2 & 11.3).

== Matches ==
=== First leg ===
Urawa Red Diamonds took the lead in the seventh minute after Rafael Silva intercepted a clearance of Salman Al-Faraj and converted from close range. Omar Kharbin scored for Al-Hilal in the 37th minute striking a close-range effort through the legs of Urawa Red Diamonds goalkeeper Shusaku Nishikawa.

18 November 2017
19:15 UTC+3

Al-Hilal (Saudi Arabia)	1–1	(Japan) Urawa Red Diamonds
Kharbin 37'	Report	Rafael Silva 7'

King Fahd International Stadium, Riyadh
Attendance: 59,136
Referee: Adham Makhadmeh (Jordan)

**Al-Hilal**	**Urawa Red Diamonds**

GK	1	(Saudi Arabia) Abdullah Al-Mayouf
RB	2	(Saudi Arabia) Mohammed Al-Breik	(yellow card) 90+1'
CB	33	(Saudi Arabia) Osama Hawsawi (c)
CB	70	(Saudi Arabia) Mohammed Jahfali	(yellow card) 45+2'
LB	12	(Saudi Arabia) Yasser Al-Shahrani
CM	7	(Saudi Arabia) Salman Al-Faraj
CM	8	(Saudi Arabia) Abdullah Otayf		(substituted off) 70'
CM	16	(Uruguay) Nicolás Milesi	(yellow card) 5'	(substituted off) 78'
RF	3	(Brazil) Carlos Eduardo		(substituted off) 19'
CF	77	(Syria) Omar Kharbin	(yellow card) 37'
LF	29	(Saudi Arabia) Salem Al-Dawsari
Substitutes:
GK	30	(Saudi Arabia) Mohammed Al-Waked
DF	4	(Saudi Arabia) Abdullah Al-Zori
MF	6	(Saudi Arabia) Abdulmalek Al-Khaibri
MF	24	(Saudi Arabia) Nawaf Al Abed	(yellow card) 66'	(substituted on) 19'
MF	27	(Saudi Arabia) Mohamed Kanno	(yellow card) 80'	(substituted on) 78'
FW	20	(Saudi Arabia) Yasser Al-Qahtani
FW	44	(Saudi Arabia) Mukhtar Fallatah		(substituted on) 70'
Manager:
(Argentina) Ramón Díaz

GK	1	(Japan) Shusaku Nishikawa
RB	6	(Japan) Wataru Endo
CB	5	(Japan) Tomoaki Makino
CB	22	(Japan) Yuki Abe (c)
LB	16	(Japan) Takuya Aoki
RM	9	(Japan) Yuki Muto
CM	10	(Japan) Yōsuke Kashiwagi
CM	15	(Japan) Kazuki Nagasawa		(substituted off) 76'
LM	3	(Japan) Tomoya Ugajin	(yellow card) 12'
CF	30	(Japan) Shinzo Koroki		(substituted off) 86'
CF	8	(Brazil) Rafael Silva		(substituted off) 64'
Substitutes:
GK	25	(Japan) Tetsuya Enomoto
DF	4	(Japan) Daisuke Nasu
DF	46	(Japan) Ryota Moriwaki
MF	7	(Japan) Tsukasa Umesaki		(substituted on) 76'
MF	39	(Japan) Shinya Yajima
FW	13	(Japan) Toshiyuki Takagi		(substituted on) 86'
FW	21	(Slovenia) Zlatan Ljubijankić		(substituted on) 64'
Manager:
(Japan) Takafumi Hori

Man of the Match:
Shusaku Nishikawa (Urawa Red Diamonds)

Assistant referees:
Ahmad Al-Roalle (Jordan)
Issa Al-Amawi (Jordan)
Fourth official:
Yousef Al-Jararwah (Jordan)
Additional assistant referees:
Muhammad Taqi (Singapore)
Hettikamkanamge Perera (Sri Lanka)

=== Second leg ===
Carlos Eduardo (Al-Hilal) tore the anterior cruciate ligament in his left knee during first leg and was ruled out from second leg. Urawa Red Diamonds scored the only goal in the 88th minute when Rafael Silva scored from the right of the penalty area, shooting high to the net with his right foot.

25 November 2017
19:15 UTC+9

Urawa Red Diamonds (Japan)	1–0	(Saudi Arabia) Al-Hilal
Rafael Silva 88'	Report

Saitama Stadium 2002, Saitama
Attendance: 57,727
Referee: Ravshan Irmatov (Uzbekistan)

**Urawa Red Diamonds**	**Al-Hilal**

GK	1	(Japan) Shusaku Nishikawa
RB	6	(Japan) Wataru Endo
CB	5	(Japan) Tomoaki Makino	(yellow card) 27'
CB	22	(Japan) Yuki Abe (c)
LB	16	(Japan) Takuya Aoki
RM	9	(Japan) Yuki Muto
CM	10	(Japan) Yōsuke Kashiwagi		(substituted off) 90+3'
CM	15	(Japan) Kazuki Nagasawa	(yellow card) 70'
LM	3	(Japan) Tomoya Ugajin	(yellow card) 13'	(substituted off) 74'
CF	30	(Japan) Shinzo Koroki		(substituted off) 84'
CF	8	(Brazil) Rafael Silva
Substitutes:
GK	25	(Japan) Tetsuya Enomoto
DF	2	(Brazil) Maurício Antônio		(substituted on) 74'
DF	46	(Japan) Ryota Moriwaki
MF	7	(Japan) Tsukasa Umesaki		(substituted on) 90+3'
MF	39	(Japan) Shinya Yajima
FW	13	(Japan) Toshiyuki Takagi
FW	21	(Slovenia) Zlatan Ljubijankić		(substituted on) 84'
Manager:
(Japan) Takafumi Hori

GK	1	(Saudi Arabia) Abdullah Al-Mayouf
RB	2	(Saudi Arabia) Mohammed Al-Breik
CB	33	(Saudi Arabia) Osama Hawsawi (c)
CB	70	(Saudi Arabia) Mohammed Jahfali
LB	12	(Saudi Arabia) Yasser Al-Shahrani
CM	7	(Saudi Arabia) Salman Al-Faraj		(substituted off) 68'
CM	8	(Saudi Arabia) Abdullah Otayf	(yellow card) 20'	(substituted off) 87'
CM	16	(Uruguay) Nicolás Milesi
RF	24	(Saudi Arabia) Nawaf Al Abed	(yellow card) 77'
CF	77	(Syria) Omar Kharbin		(substituted off) 62'
LF	29	(Saudi Arabia) Salem Al-Dawsari	(yellow card) 72' (yellow-red card) 79'
Substitutes:
GK	30	(Saudi Arabia) Mohammed Al-Waked
DF	4	(Saudi Arabia) Abdullah Al-Zori
MF	6	(Saudi Arabia) Abdulmalek Al-Khaibri
MF	10	(Saudi Arabia) Mohammad Al-Shalhoub		(substituted on) 87'
MF	27	(Saudi Arabia) Mohamed Kanno
FW	20	(Saudi Arabia) Yasser Al-Qahtani	(yellow card) 80'	(substituted on) 68'
FW	44	(Saudi Arabia) Mukhtar Fallatah		(substituted on) 62'
Manager:
(Argentina) Ramón Díaz

Man of the Match:
Rafael Silva (Urawa Red Diamonds)

Assistant referees:
Abdukhamidullo Rasulov (Uzbekistan)
Jakhongir Saidov (Uzbekistan)
Fourth official:
Mamur Saidkasimov (Uzbekistan)
Additional assistant referees:
Valentin Kovalenko (Uzbekistan)
Ilgiz Tantashev (Uzbekistan)

== See also ==
- 2017 AFC Cup Final
