= Tomoya Ugajin =

Japanese footballer (born 1988)

Tomoya Ugajin 宇賀神 友弥
Personal information
- Full name: Tomoya Ugajin
- Date of birth: 23 March 1988 (age 38)
- Place of birth: Toda, Saitama, Japan
- Height: 1.71 m (5 ft 7 in)
- Positions: Left back; left winger

Youth career
- 2003–2005: Urawa Red Diamonds

College career
Years	Team	Apps	(Gls)
2006–2009	Ryutsu Keizai University		

Senior career*
Years	Team	Apps	(Gls)
2010–2021	Urawa Red Diamonds	293	(16)
2022–2023	FC Gifu	64	(4)
2024	Urawa Red Diamonds	2	(0)
Total		359	(20)

International career
2018	Japan	1	(0)
Medal record
Urawa Red Diamonds
Winner	AFC Champions League	2017
Runner-up	J1 League	2014
Runner-up	J1 League	2016
Winner	J.League Cup	2016
Runner-up	J.League Cup	2011
Runner-up	J.League Cup	2013
Winner	Emperor's Cup	2018
Runner-up	Emperor's Cup	2015
- * Club domestic league appearances and goals

Tomoya Ugajin (宇賀神 友弥, Ugajin Tomoya; born 23 March 1988) is a Japanese former footballer who played as a left back, most notably for Urawa Red Diamonds.

== Club statistics ==
Appearances and goals by club, season and competition
Club	Season	League			National cup (Note: Includes Emperor's Cup)		League cup (Note: Includes J.League Cup)		Continental		Other		Total	
Club	Season	Division	Apps	Goals	Apps	Goals	Apps	Goals	Apps	Goals	Apps	Goals	Apps	Goals
Ryutsu Keizai University F.C.	2006	JFL	2	0	0	0	–		–		–		2	0
Ryutsu Keizai University F.C.	2007	JFL	1	0	0	0	–		–		–		1	0
Ryutsu Keizai University F.C.	2008	JFL	18	2	2	1	–		–		–		20	3
Ryutsu Keizai University F.C.	2009	JFL	10	3	1	0	–		–		–		11	3
Ryutsu Keizai University F.C.	Total		31	5	3	1	–		–		–		34	6
Urawa Red Diamonds	2009	J.League Division 1	0	0	0	0	0	0	0	0	0	0	0	0
Urawa Red Diamonds	2010	J.League Division 1	26	2	2	1	4	0	0	0	0	0	32	3
Urawa Red Diamonds	2011	J.League Division 1	14	0	3	0	5	0	0	0	0	0	22	0
Urawa Red Diamonds	2012	J.League Division 1	24	2	3	0	4	2	0	0	0	0	31	4
Urawa Red Diamonds	2013	J.League Division 1	31	1	0	0	5	0	5 (Note: Appearances in AFC Champions League Elite)	0	0	0	41	1
Urawa Red Diamonds	2014	J.League Division 1	31	3	1	1	4	0	0	0	0	0	36	4
Urawa Red Diamonds	2015	J1 League	31	1	3	1	2	0	3	0	1 (Note: Appearance in J. League Championship)	0	40	2
Urawa Red Diamonds	2016	J1 League	26	3	1	0	4	0	5	1	2	0	38	4
Urawa Red Diamonds	2017	J1 League	22	0	1	0	0	0	9	1	3 (Note: Appearances in Japanese Super Cup) (Note: Appearance in FIFA Club World Cup)	0	35	1
Urawa Red Diamonds	2018	J1 League	29	2	6	2	3	0	0	0	0	0	38	4
Urawa Red Diamonds	2019	J1 League	21	1	2	0	1	0	8	0	1	0	33	1
Urawa Red Diamonds	2020	J1 League	19	0	0	0	1	0	0	0	0	0	20	0
Urawa Red Diamonds	2021	J1 League	19	1	6	1	8	0	0	0	0	0	33	2
Urawa Red Diamonds	Total		293	16	28	6	41	2	30	2	7	0	399	26
FC Gifu	2022	J3 League	30	3	0	0	–		–		–		30	3
FC Gifu	2023	J3 League	34	1	1	0	–		–		–		35	1
FC Gifu	Total		64	4	1	0	0	0	0	0	0	0	65	4
Urawa Red Diamonds	2024	J1 League	2	0	0	0	0	0	0	0	0	0	2	0
Career total			387	25	29	6	41	2	30	2	7	0	494	35

== National team statistics ==
Japan national team
Year	Apps	Goals
2018	1	0
Total	1	0

== Honours ==
=== Club ===
Urawa Red Diamonds

- AFC Champions League: 2017
- J.League Cup: 2016
- Emperor's Cup: 2018, 2021
