= 2018 in Japanese football =

Football in Japan
- Season: 2018

Men's football
- J1 League: Kawasaki Frontale
- J2 League: Matsumoto Yamaga
- J3 League: FC Ryukyu
- Japan Football League: Honda FC
- Emperor's Cup: Urawa Red Diamonds
- J.League Cup: Shonan Bellmare
- Japanese Super Cup: Cerezo Osaka

Women's football
- Nadeshiko League 1: NTV Beleza
- Nadeshiko League 2: Iga FC Kunoichi
- Empress's Cup: NTV Beleza
- Nadeshiko League Cup: NTV Beleza

The 2018 season was the 90th season of competitive association football in Japan.

== Promotion and relegation ==
Teams relegated from J1 League

- Ventforet Kofu
- Albirex Niigata
- Omiya Ardija

Teams promoted to J1 League

- Shonan Bellmare
- V-Varen Nagasaki
- Nagoya Grampus

Teams relegated from J2 League

- Thespakusatsu Gunma

Teams promoted to J2 League

- Tochigi SC

Teams relegated from J3 League

No relegation to the Japan Football League

Teams promoted to J3 League

- No promotion from the Japan Football League

Teams promoted to Japan Football League

- Cobaltore Onagawa
- Tegevajaro Miyazaki

== Men's Football ==
=== J1 League ===
Pos	Team	Pld	W	D	L	GF	GA	GD	Pts	Qualification or relegation
1	Kawasaki Frontale (C)	34	21	6	7	57	27	+30	69	Qualification for the Champions League group stage
2	Sanfrecce Hiroshima	34	17	6	11	47	35	+12	57	Qualification for the Champions League play-off round
3	Kashima Antlers	34	16	8	10	50	39	+11	56	Qualification for the Champions League play-off round
4	Hokkaido Consadole Sapporo	34	15	10	9	48	48	0	55	
5	Urawa Red Diamonds	34	14	9	11	51	39	+12	51	Qualification for the Champions League group stage (Note: Urawa Red Diamonds qualified for the 2019 AFC Champions League group stage as 2018 Emperor's Cup winners.)
6	FC Tokyo	34	14	8	12	39	34	+5	50	
7	Cerezo Osaka	34	13	11	10	39	38	+1	50	
8	Shimizu S-Pulse	34	14	7	13	56	48	+8	49	
9	Gamba Osaka	34	14	6	14	41	46	−5	48	
10	Vissel Kobe	34	12	9	13	45	52	−7	45	
11	Vegalta Sendai	34	13	6	15	44	54	−10	45	
12	Yokohama F. Marinos	34	12	5	17	56	56	0	41	
13	Shonan Bellmare	34	10	11	13	38	43	−5	41	
14	Sagan Tosu	34	10	11	13	29	34	−5	41	
15	Nagoya Grampus	34	12	5	17	52	59	−7	41	
16	Júbilo Iwata (O)	34	10	11	13	35	48	−13	41	Qualification for the Relegation play-off
17	Kashiwa Reysol (R)	34	12	3	19	47	54	−7	39	Relegation to J2 League
18	V-Varen Nagasaki (R)	34	8	6	20	39	59	−20	30	Relegation to J2 League

Source: Meiji Yasuda J1 League
Rules for classification: 1) Points; 2) Goal difference; 3) Goals scored
(C) Champions; (O) Play-off winners; (R) Relegated

=== J2 League ===
Pos	Team	Pld	W	D	L	GF	GA	GD	Pts	Promotion, qualification or relegation
1	Matsumoto Yamaga (C, P)	42	21	14	7	54	34	+20	77	Promotion to 2019 J1 League
2	Oita Trinita (P)	42	23	7	12	76	51	+25	76	Promotion to 2019 J1 League
3	Yokohama FC	42	21	13	8	63	44	+19	76	Qualification for promotion play-offs (Note: Only teams that meet J1 license criteria can participate in promotion play-offs. If one or more teams fail to meet the criteria, only eligible teams that finished 3rd to 6th will participate and no replacement teams will be added.)
4	Machida Zelvia	42	21	13	8	62	44	+18	76	Ineligible for promotion play-offs
5	Omiya Ardija	42	21	8	13	65	48	+17	71	Qualification for promotion play-offs
6	Tokyo Verdy	42	19	14	9	56	41	+15	71	Qualification for promotion play-offs
7	Avispa Fukuoka	42	19	13	10	58	42	+16	70	
8	Renofa Yamaguchi	42	16	13	13	63	64	−1	61	
9	Ventforet Kofu	42	16	11	15	56	46	+10	59	
10	Mito HollyHock	42	16	9	17	48	46	+2	57	
11	Tokushima Vortis	42	16	8	18	48	42	+6	56	
12	Montedio Yamagata	42	14	14	14	49	51	−2	56	
13	Zweigen Kanazawa	42	14	13	15	52	48	+4	55	
14	JEF United Chiba	42	16	7	19	72	72	0	55	
15	Fagiano Okayama	42	14	11	17	39	43	−4	53	
16	Albirex Niigata	42	15	8	19	48	56	−8	53	
17	Tochigi SC	42	13	11	18	38	48	−10	50	
18	Ehime FC	42	12	12	18	34	52	−18	48	
19	Kyoto Sanga	42	12	7	23	40	58	−18	43	
20	FC Gifu	42	11	9	22	44	62	−18	42	
21	Roasso Kumamoto (R)	42	9	7	26	50	79	−29	34	Relegation to 2019 J3 League (Note: Direct exchange between J2 and J3 is subject to eligibility of J2-licensed teams in top 2 of 2018 J3 League.)
22	Kamatamare Sanuki (R)	42	7	10	25	28	72	−44	31	Relegation to 2019 J3 League

Source: 2018 MEIJI YASUDA J2 LEAGUE League table
Rules for classification: 1) Points; 2) Goal difference; 3) Goals scored
(C) Champions; (P) Promoted; (R) Relegated

=== J3 League ===
Pos	Team	Pld	W	D	L	GF	GA	GD	Pts	Promotion
1	FC Ryukyu (C, P)	32	20	6	6	70	40	+30	66	Promotion to 2019 J2 League (Note: Only teams that hold a J2 license are eligible for promotion.)
2	Kagoshima United (P)	32	16	9	7	46	35	+11	57	Promotion to 2019 J2 League
3	Gainare Tottori	32	15	8	9	61	47	+14	53	
4	Azul Claro Numazu	32	14	10	8	40	29	+11	52	
5	Thespakusatsu Gunma	32	15	7	10	37	35	+2	52	
6	Gamba Osaka U-23	32	13	8	11	53	43	+10	47	
7	Cerezo Osaka U-23	32	13	7	12	47	36	+11	46	
8	Blaublitz Akita	32	12	7	13	37	35	+2	43	
9	SC Sagamihara	32	12	6	14	42	53	−11	42	
10	Nagano Parceiro	32	10	11	11	39	37	+2	41	
11	Kataller Toyama	32	12	5	15	41	50	−9	41	
12	Fukushima United	32	9	13	10	36	43	−7	40	
13	Grulla Morioka	32	12	4	16	41	56	−15	40	
14	FC Tokyo U-23	32	10	6	16	38	45	−7	36	
15	YSCC Yokohama	32	8	10	14	40	48	−8	34	
16	Fujieda MYFC	32	10	4	18	32	48	−16	34	
17	Giravanz Kitakyushu	32	6	9	17	22	42	−20	27	

Source: 2018 MEIJI YASUDA J3 LEAGUE League table
Rules for classification: 1) Points; 2) Goal difference; 3) Goals scored; 4th) head-to-head results; 5th) disciplinary points; 6th) draw
(C) Champions; (P) Promoted

=== Japan Football League ===
Pos	Team	Pld	W	D	L	GF	GA	GD	Pts	Qualification
1	Honda FC (C)	30	25	4	1	76	25	+51	79	
2	FC Osaka	30	18	3	9	54	34	+20	57	
3	**Vanraure Hachinohe** (P)	30	16	8	6	43	21	+22	56	Promotion to 2019 J3 League (Note: To qualify for promotion, a club must hold a 100 Year Plan status, obtain J3 license (marked in bold in the table), and finish both in the top 4 of the JFL, and either 1st or 2nd among the promotion-eligible clubs.)
4	Sony Sendai	30	16	4	10	67	43	+24	52	
5	**FC Imabari**	30	14	7	9	63	32	+31	49	
6	**Tokyo Musashino City**	30	14	7	9	49	36	+13	49	
7	MIO Biwako Shiga	30	13	7	10	38	35	+3	46	
8	**Nara Club**	30	12	6	12	33	32	+1	42	
9	Verspah Oita	30	11	6	13	29	38	−9	39	
10	ReinMeer Aomori	30	10	7	13	38	48	−10	37	
11	Veertien Mie	30	9	8	13	40	52	−12	35	
12	Tegevajaro Miyazaki	30	9	5	16	43	60	−17	32	
13	Maruyasu Okazaki	30	8	7	15	33	46	−13	31	
14	Honda Lock	30	6	11	13	29	52	−23	29	
15	Ryutsu Keizai Dragons	30	4	7	19	20	50	−30	19	
16	Cobaltore Onagawa (R)	30	4	5	21	18	65	−47	17	Relegation to 2019 Regional Leagues

Source: JFL website (in Japanese)
Rules for classification: 1) Points; 2) Goal difference; 3) Goals scored; 4) Head-to-head results; 5) Disciplinary points; 6) Draw
(C) Champions; (P) Promoted; (R) Relegated

=== Cup competitions ===
==== Emperor's Cup ====
Final

9 December 2018
15:00 JST

Urawa Red Diamonds	1–0	Vegalta Sendai
Ugajin 13'	Report

Saitama Stadium 2002, Saitama

==== J.League Cup ====
Final

27 October 2018

Shonan Bellmare	1–0	Yokohama F. Marinos
Sugioka 36'	Report

Saitama Stadium 2002, Saitama
Attendance: 44,242

==== Super Cup ====
10 February 2018
13:35 JST

Kawasaki Frontale	2–3	Cerezo Osaka
Kobayashi 51'; Ōkubo 90+2'	Report	Yamaguchi 26'; Kiyotake 48'; Takagi 78'

Saitama Stadium 2002, Saitama
Attendance: 41,803
Referee: K. Fukushima

=== AFC Champions League ===
==== Play-off round ====
East Region
Team 1	Score	Team 2
**Kashiwa Reysol** (Japan)	3–0	(Thailand) Muangthong United

==== Group stage ====
===== Group E =====
Pos	Team	Pld	W	D	L	GF	GA	GD	Pts	Qualification	JEO	TJQ	KSW	KIT
1	(South Korea) Jeonbuk Hyundai Motors	6	5	0	1	22	9	+13	**15**	Advance to knockout stage	—	6–3	**3–2**	3–0
2	(China) Tianjin Quanjian	6	4	1	1	15	11	+4	**13**	Advance to knockout stage	4–2	—	**3–2**	3–0
**3**	(Japan) Kashiwa Reysol	**6**	**1**	**1**	**4**	**6**	**10**	**−4**	**4**		**0–2**	**1–1**	—	**1–0**
4	(Hong Kong) Kitchee	6	1	0	5	1	14	−13	**3**		0–6	0–1	**1–0**	—

Source: AFC

===== Group F =====
Pos	Team	Pld	W	D	L	GF	GA	GD	Pts	Qualification	SSI	ULS	MEL	KAW
1	(China) Shanghai SIPG	6	3	2	1	10	6	+4	**11**	Advance to knockout stage	—	2–2	4–1	**1–1**
2	(South Korea) Ulsan Hyundai	6	2	3	1	15	11	+4	**9**	Advance to knockout stage	0–1	—	6–2	**2–1**
3	(Australia) Melbourne Victory	6	2	2	2	11	16	−5	**8**		2–1	3–3	—	**1–0**
**4**	(Japan) Kawasaki Frontale	**6**	**0**	**3**	**3**	**6**	**9**	**−3**	**3**		**0–1**	**2–2**	**2–2**	—

Source: AFC

===== Group G =====
Pos	Team	Pld	W	D	L	GF	GA	GD	Pts	Qualification	GZE	BUR	CER	JEJ
1	(China) Guangzhou Evergrande	6	3	3	0	12	6	+6	**12**	Advance to knockout stage	—	1–1	**3–1**	5–3
2	(Thailand) Buriram United	6	2	3	1	7	6	+1	**9**	Advance to knockout stage	1–1	—	**2–0**	0–2
**3**	(Japan) Cerezo Osaka	**6**	**2**	**2**	**2**	**6**	**8**	**−2**	**8**		**0–0**	**2–2**	—	**2–1**
4	(South Korea) Jeju United	6	1	0	5	6	11	−5	**3**		0–2	0–1	**0–1**	—

Source: AFC

===== Group H =====
Pos	Team	Pld	W	D	L	GF	GA	GD	Pts	Qualification	SSB	KAS	SYD	SSH
1	(South Korea) Suwon Samsung Bluewings	6	3	1	2	8	7	+1	**10**	**Advance to knockout stage**	—	**1–2**	1–4	1–1
**2**	(Japan) Kashima Antlers	**6**	**2**	**3**	**1**	**8**	**6**	**+2**	**9**	**Advance to knockout stage**	**0–1**	—	**1–1**	**1–1**
3	(Australia) Sydney FC	6	1	3	2	7	8	−1	**6**		0–2	**0–2**	—	0–0
4	(China) Shanghai Shenhua	6	0	5	1	6	8	−2	**5**		0–2	**2–2**	2–2	—

Source: AFC

==== Knockout stage ====
===== Round of 16 =====
Team 1	Agg.	Team 2	1st leg	2nd leg
**Kashima Antlers** (Japan)	4–3	(China) Shanghai SIPG	3–1	1–2

===== Quarter-finals =====
Team 1	Agg.	Team 2	1st leg	2nd leg
**Kashima Antlers** (Japan)	5–0	(China) Tianjin Quanjian	2–0	3–0

===== Semi-finals =====
Team 1	Agg.	Team 2	1st leg	2nd leg
**Kashima Antlers** (Japan)	6–5	(South Korea) Suwon Samsung Bluewings	3–2	3–3

===== Final =====
3 November 2018
15:00 UTC+9

Kashima Antlers (Japan)	2–0	(Iran) Persepolis
Léo Silva 58'; Serginho 70'	Live Report; Stats Report

Kashima Soccer Stadium, Kashima
Attendance: 35,022
Referee: Ma Ning (China)
10 November 2018
18:30 UTC+3:30

Persepolis (Iran)	0–0	(Japan) Kashima Antlers
	Live Report; Stats Report

Azadi Stadium, Tehran
Attendance: 100,000
Referee: Ahmed Al-Kaf (Oman)

Kashima Antlers won 2–0 on aggregate.

== Women's football ==
=== L.League ===
==== Nadeshiko League Div.1 ====
Pos	Team	Pld	W	D	L	GF	GA	GD	Pts	Qualification or relegation
1	NTV Beleza (C)	18	14	3	1	38	6	+32	45	Qualification to 2019 AFC Women's Club Championship
2	INAC Kobe Leonessa	18	12	4	2	45	11	+34	40	
3	Nojima Stella Kanagawa Sagamihara	18	9	3	6	29	24	+5	30	
4	Urawa Red Diamonds Ladies	18	9	2	7	22	20	+2	29	
5	Albirex Niigata Ladies	18	8	3	7	20	22	−2	27	
6	JEF United Ichihara Chiba Ladies	18	5	8	5	19	19	0	23	
7	AC Nagano Parceiro Ladies	18	6	4	8	22	27	−5	22	
8	Vegalta Sendai Ladies	18	4	3	11	17	39	−22	15	
9	Nippon Sport Science University Fields Yokohama	18	3	4	11	14	33	−19	13	Division 1 promotion/relegation Series
10	Cerezo Osaka Sakai Ladies (R)	18	2	2	14	17	42	−25	8	Relegated to Division 2

(C) Champions; (R) Relegated

==== Nadeshiko League Div.2 ====
Pos	Team	Pld	W	D	L	GF	GA	GD	Pts	Promotion or relegation
1	Iga FC Kunoichi	18	14	2	2	29	6	+23	44	Promoted to Division 1
2	Nippatsu Yokohama FC Seagulls	18	9	4	5	32	24	+8	31	Division 1 promotion/relegation Series
3	Chifure AS Elfen Saitama	18	8	6	4	27	21	+6	30	
4	Orca Kamogawa FC	18	8	4	6	26	24	+2	28	
5	AS Harima ALBION	18	7	4	7	20	19	+1	25	
6	Ehime FC Ladies	18	5	8	5	21	21	0	23	
7	Shizuoka Sangyo University Iwata Bonita	18	4	9	5	20	23	−3	21	
8	Sfida Setagaya FC	18	5	3	10	20	28	−8	18	
9	Bunnys Kyoto SC	18	3	5	10	11	27	−16	14	Division 2 promotion/relegation Series
10	Okayama Yunogo Belle	18	2	5	11	16	29	−13	11	Relegated to Division 3

=== Cup competitions ===
==== Empress's Cup ====
Final

1 January 2019
14:45

Nippon TV Beleza	4–2 (a.e.t.)	INAC Kobe Leonessa
Ueki 54'; Momiki 71', 94'; Tanaka 104'		Masuya 42'; Kyokawa 77'

Panasonic Stadium Suita, Suita

==== Nadeshiko League Cup ====
Final

21 July 2018

Nippon TV Beleza	1–0	INAC Kobe Leonessa
Tanaka 85'	Report

Nishigaoka Soccer Stadium, Tokyo
Attendance: 1,553

== National team (Men) ==
=== Results ===
==== Friendlies ====
March 23 International Friendly	Japan	1–1	Mali	Liège, Belgium
13:20 (UTC+1)	Nakajima 90+4'	Report	Diaby 43' (pen.)	Stadium: Stade Maurice Dufrasne; Attendance: 250; Referee: Erik Lambrechts (Belgium)

June 8 International Friendly	Switzerland	2–0	Japan	Lugano, Switzerland
19:00 (UTC+2)	Rodriguez 42' (pen.); Seferovic 82'	Report		Stadium: Cornaredo Stadium; Referee: Amaury Delerue (France)

June 12 International Friendly	Japan	4–2	Paraguay	Innsbruck, Austria
15:05 (UTC+2)	Inui 51', 63'; Santander 77' (o.g.); Kagawa 90+1'	Report	Romero 32'; Ortiz 90'	Stadium: Tivoli-Neu; Attendance: 1,200; Referee: Oliver Drachta (Austria)

Kirin Challenge Cup

March 27 Kirin Challenge Cup 2018 in Europe	Japan	1–2	Ukraine	Liège, Belgium
14:20 (UTC+2)	Makino 41'	Report	Rakitskiy 21'; Karavayev 69'	Stadium: Stade Maurice Dufrasne; Attendance: 2,529; Referee: Bart Vertenten (Belgium)

May 30 Kirin Challenge Cup 2018	Japan	0–2	Ghana	Yokohama, Japan
19:25 (UTC+9)		Report	Partey 9'; Boateng 51' (pen.)	Stadium: Nissan Stadium (Yokohama); Attendance: 64,520; Referee: Chris Beath (Australia)

September 7 Kirin Challenge Cup 2018	Japan	Cancelled	Chile	Sapporo, Japan
		Report		Stadium: Sapporo Dome

September 11 Kirin Challenge Cup 2018	Japan	3–0	Costa Rica	Suita, Japan
19:20 (UTC+9)	Sasaki 16'; Minamino 66'; J. Ito 90+3'	Report		Stadium: Panasonic Stadium Suita; Attendance: 33,891; Referee: Muhammad Taqi (Singapore)

October 12 Kirin Challenge Cup 2018	Japan	3–0	Panama	Niigata, Japan
19:35 (UTC+9)	Minamino 42'; J. Ito 66'; Murillo 85' (o.g.)	Report		Stadium: Denka Big Swan Stadium; Attendance: 38,322; Referee: Kim Dong-jin (South Korea)

October 16 Kirin Challenge Cup 2018	Japan	4–3	Uruguay	Saitama, Japan
19:35 (UTC+9)	Minamino 10', 66'; Osako 36'; Doan 59'	Report	Pereiro 28'; Cavani 57'; Rodríguez 75'	Stadium: Saitama Stadium 2002; Attendance: 57,239; Referee: Ko Hyung-jin (South Korea)

November 16 Kirin Challenge Cup 2018	Japan	1–1	Venezuela	Ōita, Japan
19:30 (UTC+9)	Sakai 40'	Report	Rincón 81' (pen.)	Stadium: Ōita Bank Dome; Referee: Ravshan Irmatov (Uzbekistan)

November 20 Kirin Challenge Cup 2018	Japan	4–0	Kyrgyzstan	Toyota, Japan
19:20 (UTC+9)	Yamanaka 2'; Haraguchi 19'; Osako 72'; Nakajima 73'	Report		Stadium: Toyota Stadium; Referee: Ilgiz Tantashev (Uzbekistan)

==== 2018 FIFA World Cup ====
===== Group H =====
Pos	Team	Pld	W	D	L	GF	GA	GD	Pts	Qualification
1	Colombia	3	2	0	1	5	2	+3	6	Advance to knockout stage
2	Japan	3	1	1	1	4	4	0	4 (Note: Fair play points: Japan −4, Senegal −6.)	Advance to knockout stage
3	Senegal	3	1	1	1	4	4	0	4	
4	Poland	3	1	0	2	2	5	−3	3	

Source: FIFA
Rules for classification: Group stage tiebreakers
Notes:

Matches

June 19 2018 FIFA World Cup: Group H	Colombia	1–2	Japan	Saransk, Russia
15:00 UTC+3	Quintero 39'	Report	Kagawa 6' (pen.); Osako 73'	Stadium: Mordovia Arena; Attendance: 40,842; Referee: Damir Skomina (Slovenia)

June 24 2018 FIFA World Cup: Group H	Japan	2–2	Senegal	Ekaterinburg, Russia
20:00 UTC+5	Inui 34'; Honda 78'	Report	Mané 11'; Wagué 71'	Stadium: Central Stadium; Attendance: 32,572; Referee: Gianluca Rocchi (Italy)

June 28 2018 FIFA World Cup: Group H	Japan	0–1	Poland	Volgograd, Russia
17:00 UTC+3		Report	Bednarek 59'	Stadium: Volgograd Arena; Attendance: 42,189; Referee: Janny Sikazwe (Zambia)

==== Knockout stage ====
July 2 2018 FIFA World Cup: Round of 16	Belgium	3–2	Japan	Rostov-on-Don, Russia
21:00 UTC+3	Vertonghen 69'; Fellaini 74'; Chadli 90+4'	Report	Haraguchi 48'; Inui 52'	Stadium: Rostov Arena; Attendance: 41,466; Referee: Malang Diedhiou (Senegal)

=== Players statistics ===
Player	-2017	03.23	03.27	05.30	06.08	06.12	06.19	06.24	06.28	07.02	09.11	10.12	10.16	11.16	11.20	2018	Total
Shinji Okazaki	111(50)	-	-	O	-	O	O	O	O	-	-	-	-	-	-	5(0)	116(50)
Makoto Hasebe	106(2)	O	O	O	O	-	O	O	O	O	-	-	-	-	-	8(0)	114(2)
Yuto Nagatomo	101(3)	O	O	O	O	-	O	O	O	O	-	-	O	-	-	9(0)	110(3)
Keisuke Honda	91(36)	O	O	O	O	-	O	O(1)	-	O	-	-	-	-	-	7(1)	98(37)
Shinji Kagawa	89(29)	-	-	O	O	O(1)	O(1)	O	-	O	-	-	-	-	-	6(2)	95(31)
Eiji Kawashima	81(0)	-	O	O	O	-	O	O	O	O	-	-	-	-	-	7(0)	88(0)
Maya Yoshida	80(10)	-	-	O	O	-	O	O	O	O	-	-	O	O	O	9(0)	89(10)
Hiroki Sakai	41(0)	-	-	-	O	O	O	O	O	O	-	-	O	O(1)	-	8(1)	49(1)
Hotaru Yamaguchi	38(2)	O	O	O	-	O	O	-	O	O	-	-	-	-	-	7(0)	45(2)
Gotoku Sakai	36(0)	O	O	O	O	O	-	-	O	-	-	-	-	-	-	6(0)	42(0)
Genki Haraguchi	29(6)	-	O	O	O	O	O	O	-	O(1)	-	O	O	O	O(1)	11(2)	40(8)
Tomoaki Makino	28(3)	O	O(1)	O	O	-	-	-	O	-	O	O	-	-	O	8(1)	36(4)
Yuya Osako	25(7)	O	-	O	O	O	O(1)	O	O	O	-	O	O(1)	O	O(1)	12(3)	37(10)
Takashi Inui	25(2)	-	-	-	O	O(2)	O	O(1)	O	O(1)	-	-	-	-	-	6(4)	31(6)
Yoshinori Muto	21(2)	-	-	O	O	O	-	-	O	-	-	-	-	-	-	4(0)	25(2)
Takashi Usami	19(3)	O	O	O	O	O	-	O	O	-	-	-	-	-	-	7(0)	26(3)
Takuma Asano	17(3)	-	-	-	-	-	-	-	-	-	O	-	-	-	-	1(0)	18(3)
Gaku Shibasaki	14(3)	-	O	O	O	O	O	O	O	O	-	O	O	O	O	12(0)	26(3)
Yu Kobayashi	11(2)	O	O	-	-	-	-	-	-	-	O	-	-	-	-	3(0)	14(2)
Yuya Kubo	11(2)	O	O	-	-	-	-	-	-	-	-	-	-	-	-	2(0)	13(2)
Yosuke Ideguchi	11(2)	-	-	O	-	-	-	-	-	-	-	-	-	-	-	1(0)	12(2)
Wataru Endo	11(0)	-	-	-	-	O	-	-	-	-	O	-	O	O	-	4(0)	15(0)
Gen Shoji	10(1)	O	-	-	-	O	O	O	-	O	-	-	-	-	-	5(0)	15(1)
Toshihiro Aoyama	8(1)	-	-	-	-	-	-	-	-	-	O	O	O	-	-	3(0)	11(1)
Kengo Kawamata	8(1)	-	-	-	-	-	-	-	-	-	-	O	-	-	-	1(0)	9(1)
Kenyu Sugimoto	5(1)	-	O	-	-	-	-	-	-	-	-	-	-	O	O	3(0)	8(1)
Masaaki Higashiguchi	4(0)	-	-	-	-	O	-	-	-	-	O	-	O	-	-	3(0)	7(0)
Ryota Morioka	4(0)	O	-	-	-	-	-	-	-	-	-	-	-	-	-	1(0)	5(0)
Junya Ito	3(0)	-	-	-	-	-	-	-	-	-	O(1)	O(1)	-	O	O	4(2)	7(2)
Shuichi Gonda	3(0)	-	-	-	-	-	-	-	-	-	-	O	-	-	O	2(0)	5(0)
Shintaro Kurumaya	3(0)	-	-	-	-	-	-	-	-	-	O	-	-	-	-	1(0)	4(0)
Takumi Minamino	2(0)	-	-	-	-	-	-	-	-	-	O(1)	O(1)	O(2)	O	O	5(4)	7(4)
Ryota Oshima	2(0)	O	-	O	O	-	-	-	-	-	-	-	-	-	-	3(0)	5(0)
Genta Miura	2(0)	-	-	-	-	-	-	-	-	-	O	-	O	-	O	3(0)	5(0)
Kosuke Nakamura	2(0)	O	-	-	-	O	-	-	-	-	-	-	-	-	-	2(0)	4(0)
Naomichi Ueda	2(0)	-	O	-	-	O	-	-	-	-	-	-	-	-	-	2(0)	4(0)
Kento Misao	1(0)	O	O	-	-	-	-	-	-	-	O	O	-	-	O	5(0)	6(0)
Sei Muroya	1(0)	-	-	-	-	-	-	-	-	-	O	O	-	-	O	3(0)	4(0)
Shoya Nakajima	0(0)	O(1)	O	-	-	-	-	-	-	-	O	-	O	O	O(1)	6(2)	6(2)
Ritsu Doan	0(0)	-	-	-	-	-	-	-	-	-	O	O	O(1)	O	O	5(1)	5(1)
Sho Sasaki	0(0)	-	-	-	-	-	-	-	-	-	O	O	-	O	-	3(0)	3(0)
Koya Kitagawa	0(0)	-	-	-	-	-	-	-	-	-	-	O	-	O	O	3(0)	3(0)
Hidemasa Morita	0(0)	-	-	-	-	-	-	-	-	-	O	-	-	-	O	2(0)	2(0)
Takehiro Tomiyasu	0(0)	-	-	-	-	-	-	-	-	-	-	O	-	O	-	2(0)	2(0)
Ryosuke Yamanaka	0(0)	-	-	-	-	-	-	-	-	-	-	-	-	-	O(1)	1(1)	1(1)
Tomoya Ugajin	0(0)	O	-	-	-	-	-	-	-	-	-	-	-	-	-	1(0)	1(0)
Jun Amano	0(0)	-	-	-	-	-	-	-	-	-	O	-	-	-	-	1(0)	1(0)
Daniel Schmidt	0(0)	-	-	-	-	-	-	-	-	-	-	-	-	O	-	1(0)	1(0)

== National team (Women) ==
=== Results ===
2018.02.28	Japan	2–6	Netherlands	Portugal
	Nakajima (?); Iwabuchi (?)		? (?) ? (?) ? (?) ? (?) ? (?) ? (?)

2018.03.02	Japan	2–1	Iceland	Portugal
	Sugasawa (?); Utsugi (?)		? (?)

2018.03.05	Japan	2–0	Denmark	Portugal
	Hasegawa (?); Iwabuchi (?)

2018.03.07	Japan	0–2	Canada	Portugal
			? (?) ? (?)

2018.04.01	Japan	7–1	Ghana	Nagasaki
	Tanaka 14'; Iwabuchi 29'; Masuya 43'; Nakajima 48'; Takagi 74'; Sugasawa 79'; Sameshima 83'		? (?)	Stadium: Transcosmos Stadium Nagasaki

2018.04.07	Japan	4–0	Vietnam	Jordan
	Yokoyama 3'; Nakajima 17'; Iwabuchi 53'; Tanaka 66'

2018.04.10	Japan	0–0	South Korea	Jordan

2018.04.13	Japan	1–1	Australia	Jordan
	Sakaguchi 63'		? (?)

2018.04.17	Japan	3–1	China	Jordan
	Iwabuchi 39'; Yokoyama 85', 88'		? (?)

2018.04.20	Japan	1–0	Australia	Jordan
	Yokoyama 84'

2018.06.10	Japan	3–1	New Zealand	New Zealand
	Tanaka 17', 34', 44'		? (?)

2018.07.26	Japan	2–4	United States	United States
	Tanaka 20'; Sakaguchi 76'		? (?) ? (?) ? (?) ? (?)

2018.07.29	Japan	1–2	Brazil	United States
	Masuya 90+3'		? (?) ? (?)

2018.08.02	Japan	0–2	Australia	United States
			? (?) ? (?)

2018.08.16	Japan	2–0	Thailand	Indonesia
	Iwabuchi 33'; Momiki 85'

2018.08.21	Japan	7–0	Vietnam	Indonesia
	Sugasawa 5', 77'; Momiki 17'; Nakajima 38'; Tanaka 52', 88'; Masuya 64'

2018.08.25	Japan	2–1	North Korea	Indonesia
	Iwabuchi 40'; Hasegawa 62'		? (?)

2018.08.28	Japan	2–1	South Korea	Indonesia
	Sugasawa 5'; 86' (o.g.)		? (?)

2018.08.31	Japan	1–0	China	Indonesia
	Sugasawa 90'

2018.11.11	Japan	4–1	Norway	Tottori
	Yokoyama 16'; Iwabuchi 27', 55'; Momiki 63'		? (?)	Stadium: Tottori Bank Bird Stadium

=== Players statistics ===
Player	-2017	02.28	03.02	03.05	03.07	04.01	04.07	04.10	04.13	04.17	04.20	06.10	07.26	07.29	08.02	08.16	08.21	08.25	08.28	08.31	11.11	2018	Total
Mizuho Sakaguchi	116(28)	O	-	O	O	O	O	O	O(1)	-	O	-	-	-	-	-	-	-	-	-	-	8(1)	124(29)
Rumi Utsugi	103(5)	-	O(1)	O	O	-	-	-	O	O	O	O	-	-	-	-	-	-	-	-	O	8(1)	111(6)
Saki Kumagai	90(0)	-	O	O	O	-	O	O	O	O	O	O	-	-	-	-	-	-	-	-	O	10(0)	100(0)
Aya Sameshima	85(4)	O	-	O	O	O(1)	O	O	O	-	O	O	O	O	O	O	O	O	O	O	O	18(1)	103(5)
Nahomi Kawasumi	82(20)	-	-	-	-	O	O	O	-	O	-	O	O	O	O	-	-	-	-	-	-	8(0)	90(20)
Saori Ariyoshi	49(1)	O	-	O	O	O	O	-	-	O	-	O	O	-	O	O	-	O	O	O	O	14(0)	63(1)
Emi Nakajima	46(9)	O(1)	O	O	O	O(1)	O(1)	-	O	O	O	O	O	O	O	O	O(1)	O	O	O	O	19(4)	65(13)
Mana Iwabuchi	43(11)	O(1)	O	O(1)	O	O(1)	O(1)	O	O	O(1)	O	-	O	O	O	O(1)	-	O(1)	O	O	O(2)	18(9)	61(20)
Yuika Sugasawa	43(11)	-	O(1)	-	O	O(1)	O	O	O	-	O	O	O	O	O	O	O(2)	O	O(1)	O(1)	O	17(6)	60(17)
Kumi Yokoyama	24(11)	O	O	O	-	-	O(1)	O	-	O(2)	O(1)	-	O	O	O	-	-	-	-	-	O(1)	11(5)	35(16)
Mina Tanaka	20(6)	O	O	O	O	O(1)	O(1)	O	-	O	-	O(3)	O(1)	O	O	O	O(2)	O	-	-	-	15(8)	35(14)
Yu Nakasato	16(0)	-	-	-	-	O	-	-	-	-	-	O	-	-	-	-	O	-	O	-	-	4(0)	20(0)
Rika Masuya	15(3)	O	O	O	-	O(1)	O	-	O	O	-	-	O	O(1)	O	-	O(1)	O	-	-	-	12(3)	27(6)
Hikaru Naomoto	15(0)	-	O	-	-	O	O	-	-	-	-	-	-	-	-	-	-	-	-	-	-	3(0)	18(0)
Yuka Momiki	14(3)	-	-	-	-	-	-	-	-	-	-	-	-	O	-	O(1)	O(1)	O	O	O	O(1)	7(3)	21(6)
Yui Hasegawa	13(2)	O	O	O(1)	O	-	-	O	O	O	O	O	O	O	O	O	-	O(1)	O	O	O	17(2)	30(4)
Hikari Takagi	13(0)	O	O	-	O	O(1)	-	-	-	-	-	O	-	-	-	-	O	-	-	-	-	6(1)	19(1)
Ayaka Yamashita	11(0)	-	O	-	O	O	O	O	O	-	O	O	O	-	-	-	O	O	O	O	O	14(0)	25(0)
Sakiko Ikeda	8(0)	O	-	O	-	O	-	-	-	O	-	-	-	O	-	O	-	-	-	-	-	6(0)	14(0)
Ayumi Oya	8(0)	-	O	-	-	-	-	-	-	-	-	-	-	-	-	-	-	-	-	-	-	1(0)	9(0)
Rin Sumida	7(0)	O	O	-	O	O	-	O	-	O	-	O	O	O	O	O	O	O	O	O	-	15(0)	22(0)
Shiori Miyake	6(0)	O	-	O	-	-	-	-	-	O	-	O	O	-	O	O	O	O	O	O	-	11(0)	17(0)
Nana Ichise	6(0)	O	-	O	O	O	O	O	O	-	O	-	-	-	-	-	-	-	-	-	O	9(0)	15(0)
Madoka Haji	6(0)	O	-	-	-	-	-	-	-	-	-	-	-	-	-	-	-	-	-	-	-	1(0)	7(0)
Risa Shimizu	0(0)	O	O	O	O	O	-	O	O	O	O	O	O	O	O	O	O	O	O	O	O	19(0)	19(0)
Moeno Sakaguchi	0(0)	-	-	-	-	-	-	-	-	-	-	O	O(1)	O	O	O	O	O	O	O	O	10(1)	10(1)
Narumi Miura	0(0)	-	-	-	-	-	-	-	-	-	-	O	O	O	O	-	-	-	-	-	O	5(0)	5(0)
Aimi Kunitake	0(0)	-	-	-	-	-	-	-	-	-	-	-	-	O	-	-	O	-	O	-	-	3(0)	3(0)
Mayo Doko	0(0)	-	-	-	-	-	-	-	-	-	-	-	-	O	-	-	-	-	-	-	-	1(0)	1(0)
Chika Hirao	0(0)	-	-	-	-	-	-	-	-	-	-	-	-	-	O	-	-	-	-	-	-	1(0)	1(0)
Hina Sugita	0(0)	-	-	-	-	-	-	-	-	-	-	-	-	-	O	-	-	-	-	-	-	1(0)	1(0)
Fuka Nagano	0(0)	-	-	-	-	-	-	-	-	-	-	-	-	-	-	-	-	-	-	-	O	1(0)	1(0)
Hinata Miyazawa	0(0)	-	-	-	-	-	-	-	-	-	-	-	-	-	-	-	-	-	-	-	O	1(0)	1(0)
