= 2018 AFC Champions League =

37th edition of premier club football tournament organized by the AFC

Tournament details
- Dates: Qualifying: 16–30 January 2018; Competition proper: 12 February – 10 November 2018
- Teams: Competition proper: 32; Total: 46 (from 20 associations)

Final positions
- Champions: (Japan) Kashima Antlers (1st title)
- Runners-up: (Iran) Persepolis

Tournament statistics
- Matches played: 126
- Goals scored: 364 (2.89 per match)
- Attendance: 1,876,986 (14,897 per match)
- Top scorer: Baghdad Bounedjah (13 goals)
- Best player: Yuma Suzuki
- Fair play award: (Iran) Persepolis

The 2018 AFC Champions League was the 37th edition of Asia's premier club football tournament organized by the Asian Football Confederation (AFC), and the 16th under the current AFC Champions League title.

Kashima Antlers won the title for the first time, defeating Persepolis in the final, and qualified as the AFC representative at the 2018 FIFA Club World Cup in the United Arab Emirates.

Urawa Red Diamonds were the title holders, but they were unable to defend their title as they finished seventh in the 2017 J1 League and were eliminated in the fourth round of the 2017 Emperor's Cup, thus did not qualify for the tournament. It marked the second season in a row without title holders after Jeonbuk Hyundai Motors were disqualified in 2017 as a result of their involvement in a match-fixing scandal in 2016.

== Association team allocation ==
The AFC Competitions Committee proposed a revamp of the AFC club competitions on 25 January 2014, which was ratified by the AFC Executive Committee on 16 April 2014. The 46 AFC member associations (excluding the associate member Northern Mariana Islands) are ranked based on their national team's and clubs' performance over the last four years in AFC competitions, with the allocation of slots for the 2017 and 2018 editions of the AFC club competitions determined by the 2016 AFC rankings (Entry Manual Article 2.2):

- The associations were split into two regions:
  - West Region consists of the associations from the West Asian Football Federation (WAFF), the Central Asian Football Association (CAFA), and the South Asian Football Federation (SAFF).
  - East Region consists of the associations from the ASEAN Football Federation (AFF) and the East Asian Football Federation (EAFF).
- In each region, there are four groups in the group stage, including a total of 12 direct slots, with the 4 remaining slots filled through play-offs.
- The top 12 associations in each region as per the AFC rankings are eligible to enter the AFC Champions League, as long as they fulfill the AFC Champions League criteria.
- The top six associations in each region get at least one direct slot in the group stage, while the remaining associations get only play-off slots (as well as AFC Cup group stage slots):
  - The associations ranked 1st and 2nd each get three direct slots and one play-off slot.
  - The associations ranked 3rd and 4th each get two direct slots and two play-off slots.
  - The associations ranked 5th each get one direct slot and two play-off slots.
  - The associations ranked 6th each get one direct slot and one play-off slot.
  - The associations ranked 7th to 12th each get one play-off slot.
- The maximum number of slots for each association is one-third of the total number of eligible teams in the top division.
- If any association gives up its direct slots, they are redistributed to the highest eligible association, with each association limited to a maximum of three direct slots.
- If any association gives up its play-off slots, they are annulled and not redistributed to any other association.

For the 2018 AFC Champions League, the associations are allocated slots according to their association ranking published on 30 November 2016, which takes into account their performance in the AFC Champions League and the AFC Cup, as well as their national team's FIFA World Rankings, during the period between 2013 and 2016.

Participation for 2018 AFC Champions League
Participating
Not participating

West Region
Rank		Member Association	Points	Slots			
Rank		Member Association	Points	Group stage	Play-off		
Region	AFC	Member Association	Points	Group stage	Play-off round	Prelim. round 2	Prelim. round 1
1	2	(United Arab Emirates) United Arab Emirates	87.555	3	1	0	0
2	3	(Saudi Arabia) Saudi Arabia	84.698	2	0	0	0
3	4	Iran	78.908	3	1	0	0
4	5	Qatar	78.171	3	1	0	0
5	9	Uzbekistan	56.876	1	2	0	0
6	10	Iraq	37.240	0	0	0	0
7	11	Kuwait	36.457	0	0	0	0
8	13	Syria	34.257	0	0	0	0
9	15	Jordan	31.213	0	1	0	0
10	18	India	27.930	0	1	0	0
11	19	Bahrain	27.353	0	1	0	0
12	20	Lebanon	22.077	0	0	0	0
Total				12	8	0	0
Total				12	8		
Total				20			

East Region
Rank		Member Association	Points	Slots			
Rank		Member Association	Points	Group stage	Play-off		
Region	AFC	Member Association	Points	Group stage	Play-off round	Prelim. round 2	Prelim. round 1
1	1	(South Korea) South Korea	96.311	3	1	0	0
2	6	Japan	75.807	3	1	0	0
3	7	China	72.719	2	2	0	0
4	8	Australia	72.599	2	0	1	0
5	12	Thailand	34.753	1	0	2	0
6	14	(Hong Kong) Hong Kong	31.797	1	0	1	0
7	16	Vietnam	29.273	0	0	1	0
8	17	Malaysia	28.865	0	0	1	0
9	21	Indonesia	20.372	0	0	0	1
10	24	Myanmar	17.220	0	0	0	1
11	25	Philippines	17.188	0	0	0	1
12	27	Singapore	13.664	0	0	0	1
Total				12	4	6	4
Total				12	14		
Total				26			

Notes

1. Australia (AUS): The top division run by the Football Federation Australia, the A-League, only have nine Australia-based teams in the 2016–17 season, so Australia can only get a maximum of three total slots (Entry Manual 5.4).
2. Iraq (IRQ): Iraq did not implement the AFC Champions League club licensing system.
3. Kuwait (KUW): Kuwait could not enter due to FIFA's suspension of the Kuwait Football Association at the entry deadline. (Even if its suspension were lifted, Kuwaiti clubs would not enter since Kuwait did not implement club licensing system.)
4. Lebanon (LIB): Lebanon did not implement the AFC Champions League club licensing system.
5. Saudi Arabia (KSA): Saudi Arabia had only two entries as Al-Nassr and Al-Ittihad, the 2016–17 Saudi Professional League 3rd place and 4th place, which would have entered the group stage and qualifying play-offs respectively, failed to obtain an AFC licence, and no other teams below them in the league were eligible to replace them, as all other licensed teams from Saudi Arabia finished in the bottom half of the league and did not meet the sporting criteria (Entry Manual 12.6).
6. Syria (SYR): Syria did not implement the AFC Champions League club licensing system.

== Teams ==
The following 46 teams from 20 associations entered the competition.

In the following table, the number of appearances and last appearance count only those since the 2002–03 season (including qualifying rounds), when the competition was rebranded as the AFC Champions League.

West RegionGroup stage direct entrants (Groups A–D)
Team	Qualifying method	App (Last)
(United Arab Emirates) Al-Jazira	2016–17 UAE Pro-League champions	10th (2017)
(United Arab Emirates) Al-Wahda	2016–17 UAE President's Cup winners	9th (2017)
(United Arab Emirates) Al-Wasl	2016–17 UAE Pro-League runners-up	2nd (2008)
(Saudi Arabia) Al-Hilal	2016–17 Saudi Professional League champions and 2017 King Cup winners	14th (2017)
(Saudi Arabia) Al-Ahli	2016–17 Saudi Professional League runners-up	10th (2017)
(Iran) Persepolis	2016–17 Persian Gulf Pro League champions and 2017 Iranian Super Cup winners	7th (2017)
(Iran) Esteghlal	2016–17 Persian Gulf Pro League runners-up	9th (2017)
(Iran) Tractor	2016–17 Persian Gulf Pro League 3rd place	5th (2016)
(Qatar) Al-Duhail	2016–17 Qatar Stars League champions	7th (2017)
(Qatar) Al-Sadd	2017 Emir of Qatar Cup winners 2016–17 Qatar Stars League runners-up	13th (2017)
(Qatar) Al-Rayyan	2016–17 Qatar Stars League 3rd place	8th (2017)
(Uzbekistan) Lokomotiv Tashkent	2017 Uzbek League champions and 2017 Uzbekistan Cup winners	6th (2017)

Qualifying play-off participants: Entering in play-off round
Team	Qualifying method	App (Last)
(United Arab Emirates) Al-Ain	2016–17 UAE Pro-League 4th place	13th (2017)
(Iran) Zob Ahan	2016–17 Persian Gulf Pro League 4th place	7th (2017)
(Qatar) Al-Gharafa	2016–17 Qatar Stars League 5th place	9th (2013)
(Uzbekistan) Nasaf Qarshi	2017 Uzbek League runners-up	6th (2017)
(Uzbekistan) Pakhtakor	2017 Uzbek League 3rd place	14th (2016)
(Jordan) Al-Faisaly	2016–17 Jordan League champions	2nd (2002–03)
(India) Aizawl	2016–17 I-League champions	1st
(Bahrain) Malkiya	2016–17 Bahrain First Division League champions	1st

East RegionGroup stage direct entrants (Groups E–H)
Team	Qualifying method	App (Last)
(South Korea) Jeonbuk Hyundai Motors	2017 K League Classic champions	11th (2016)
(South Korea) Ulsan Hyundai	2017 Korean FA Cup winners	6th (2017)
(South Korea) Jeju United	2017 K League Classic runners-up	3rd (2017)
(Japan) Kawasaki Frontale	2017 J1 League champions	6th (2017)
(Japan) Cerezo Osaka	2017 Emperor's Cup winners 2017 J1 League 3rd place	3rd (2014)
(Japan) Kashima Antlers	2017 J1 League runners-up	8th (2017)
(China) Guangzhou Evergrande	2017 Chinese Super League champions	7th (2017)
(China) Shanghai Shenhua	2017 Chinese FA Cup winners	8th (2017)
(Australia) Sydney FC	2016–17 A-League premiers and 2017 A-League Grand Final winners	4th (2016)
(Australia) Melbourne Victory	2016–17 A-League regular season runners-up	6th (2016)
(Thailand) Buriram United	2017 Thai League T1 champions	7th (2016)
(Hong Kong) Kitchee	2016–17 Hong Kong Premier League champions	4th (2017)

Qualifying play-off participants: Entering in play-off round
Team	Qualifying method	App (Last)
(South Korea) Suwon Samsung Bluewings	2017 K League Classic 3rd place	9th (2017)
(Japan) Kashiwa Reysol	2017 J1 League 4th place	4th (2015)
(China) Shanghai SIPG	2017 Chinese Super League runners-up	3rd (2017)
(China) Tianjin Quanjian	2017 Chinese Super League 3rd place	1st

Qualifying play-off participants: Entering in preliminary round 2
Team	Qualifying method	App (Last)
(Australia) Brisbane Roar	2016–17 A-League regular season 3rd place	5th (2017)
(Thailand) Chiangrai United	2017 Thai FA Cup winners	1st
(Thailand) Muangthong United	2017 Thai League T1 runners-up	7th (2017)
(Hong Kong) Eastern	2016–17 Hong Kong season play-off winners	2nd (2017)
(Vietnam) FLC Thanh Hóa	2017 V.League 1 runners-up	1st
(Malaysia) Johor Darul Ta'zim	2017 Malaysia Super League champions	4th (2017)

Qualifying play-off participants: Entering in preliminary round 1
Team	Qualifying method	App (Last)
(Indonesia) Bali United	2017 Liga 1 runners-up	1st
(Myanmar) Shan United	2017 Myanmar National League champions	1st
(Philippines) Ceres–Negros	2017 Philippines Football League champions	1st
(Singapore) Tampines Rovers	2017 S.League runners-up	4th (2017)

Notes

1. Indonesia (IDN): Bhayangkara, the 2017 Liga 1 champions, failed to obtain an AFC licence. As a result, Bali United, the league runners-up, entered the qualifying play-offs.
2. Iran (IRN): Naft Tehran, the 2016–17 Hazfi Cup winners, failed to obtain an AFC licence. As a result, Tractor, the 2016–17 Persian Gulf Pro League 3rd place, entered the groups stage instead of the qualifying play-offs, while Zob Ahan, the league 4th place, entered the qualifying play-offs.
3. Qatar (QAT): El Jaish, the 2016–17 Qatar Stars League 4th place, were merged into Lekhwiya to form Al-Duhail after the 2016–17 season. As a result, Al-Gharafa, the league 5th place, entered the qualifying play-offs.
4. Singapore (SIN): Albirex Niigata Singapore, the 2017 S.League champions, is a satellite team of Japanese club Albirex Niigata and thus ineligible to represent Singapore in AFC club competitions. As a result, Tampines Rovers, the league runners-up, entered the qualifying play-offs.
5. United Arab Emirates (UAE): Al-Ahli, the 2016–17 UAE Pro-League 3rd place, merged with Al-Shabab and Dubai to form Shabab Al-Ahli Dubai after the 2016–17 season, and were excluded from the AFC Champions League for failing to be in existence for the necessary three year requirement. As a result, Al-Ain, the league 4th place, entered the qualifying play-offs (initially they failed to obtain an AFC licence but later won their appeal).
6. Vietnam (VIE): Quảng Nam, the 2017 V.League 1 champions, failed to obtain an AFC licence. As a result, FLC Thanh Hóa, the league runners-up, entered the qualifying play-offs.
Location of teams of the 2018 AFC Champions League.
West Region
East Region
(p) Qualifying play-off participants
Location of the 2025–26 AFC Champions League Elite league stage teams
Blue: West Region

== Schedule ==
The schedule of the competition was as follows.

Stage	Round	Draw date	First leg	Second leg
Preliminary stage	Preliminary round 1	No draw	16 January 2018	
Preliminary stage	Preliminary round 2	No draw	23 January 2018	
Play-off stage	Play-off round	No draw	30 January 2018	
Group stage	Matchday 1	6 December 2017	12–14 February 2018	
Group stage	Matchday 2	6 December 2017	19–21 February 2018	
Group stage	Matchday 3	6 December 2017	5–7 March 2018	
Group stage	Matchday 4	6 December 2017	12–14 March 2018	
Group stage	Matchday 5	6 December 2017	2–4 April 2018	
Group stage	Matchday 6	6 December 2017	16–18 April 2018	
Knockout stage	Round of 16	6 December 2017	7–9 May 2018	14–16 May 2018
Knockout stage	Quarter-finals	23 May 2018	27–29 August 2018	17–19 September 2018
Knockout stage	Semi-finals	23 May 2018	2–3 October 2018	23–24 October 2018
Knockout stage	Final	23 May 2018	3 November 2018	10 November 2018

== Qualifying play-offs ==
In the qualifying play-offs, each tie was played as a single match. Extra time and penalty shoot-out were used to decide the winner if necessary (Regulations Article 9.2). The eight winners of the play-off round advanced to the group stage to join the 24 direct entrants. All losers in each round from associations with only play-off slots entered the AFC Cup group stage. The bracket of the qualifying play-offs for each region was determined by the AFC based on the association ranking of each team, with the team from the higher-ranked association hosting the match. Teams from the same association could not be placed into the same play-off.

=== Preliminary round 1 ===
East Region
Team 1	Score	Team 2
Bali United (Indonesia)	3–1	(Singapore) Tampines Rovers
Shan United (Myanmar)	1–1 (a.e.t.) (3–4 p)	(Philippines) Ceres–Negros

=== Preliminary round 2 ===
East Region
Team 1	Score	Team 2
Eastern (Hong Kong)	2–4	(Vietnam) FLC Thanh Hóa
Muangthong United (Thailand)	5–2	(Malaysia) Johor Darul Ta'zim
Chiangrai United (Thailand)	2–1 (a.e.t.)	(Indonesia) Bali United
Brisbane Roar (Australia)	2–3	(Philippines) Ceres–Negros

=== Play-off round ===
West Region
Team 1	Score	Team 2
Al-Ain (United Arab Emirates)	2–0	(Bahrain) Malkiya
Zob Ahan (Iran)	3–1	(India) Aizawl
Al-Gharafa (Qatar)	2–1	(Uzbekistan) Pakhtakor
Nasaf Qarshi (Uzbekistan)	5–1	(Jordan) Al-Faisaly

East Region
Team 1	Score	Team 2
Suwon Samsung Bluewings (South Korea)	5–1	(Vietnam) FLC Thanh Hóa
Kashiwa Reysol (Japan)	3–0	(Thailand) Muangthong United
Shanghai SIPG (China)	1–0	(Thailand) Chiangrai United
Tianjin Quanjian (China)	2–0	(Philippines) Ceres–Negros

== Group stage ==
The draw for the group stage was held on 6 December 2017, 16:30 MYT (UTC+8), at the AFC House in Kuala Lumpur, Malaysia. The 32 teams were drawn into eight groups of four: four groups each in the West Region (Groups A–D) and the East Region (Groups E–H). Teams from the same association could not be drawn into the same group. In the group stage, each group was played on a home-and-away round-robin basis. The winners and runners-up of each group advanced to the round of 16 of the knockout stage.

Tiebreakers
The teams were ranked according to points (3 points for a win, 1 point for a draw, 0 points for a loss). If tied on points, tiebreakers were applied in the following order (Regulations Article 10.5):
1. Points in head-to-head matches among tied teams;
2. Goal difference in head-to-head matches among tied teams;
3. Goals scored in head-to-head matches among tied teams;
4. Away goals scored in head-to-head matches among tied teams;
5. If more than two teams are tied, and after applying all head-to-head criteria above, a subset of teams are still tied, all head-to-head criteria above are reapplied exclusively to this subset of teams;
6. Goal difference in all group matches;
7. Goals scored in all group matches;
8. Penalty shoot-out if only two teams are tied and they met in the last round of the group;
9. Disciplinary points (yellow card = 1 point, red card as a result of two yellow cards = 3 points, direct red card = 3 points, yellow card followed by direct red card = 4 points);
10. Team from the higher-ranked association.

=== Group A ===
Pos	Team	Pld	W	D	L	GF	GA	GD	Pts	Qualification	AHL	JAZ	GHA	TRA
1	(Saudi Arabia) Al-Ahli	6	4	2	0	9	4	+5	14	Advance to knockout stage	—	2–1	1–1	2–0
2	(United Arab Emirates) Al-Jazira	6	2	2	2	9	9	0	8 (Note: Head-to-head results: Al-Jazira 3–2 Al-Gharafa, Al-Gharafa 2–3 Al-Jazira.)	Advance to knockout stage	1–2	—	3–2	0–0
3	(Qatar) Al-Gharafa	6	2	2	2	12	9	+3	8		1–1	2–3	—	3–0
4	(Iran) Tractor Sazi	6	0	2	4	2	10	−8	2		0–1	1–1	1–3	—

Source: AFC

=== Group B ===
Pos	Team	Pld	W	D	L	GF	GA	GD	Pts	Qualification	DUH	ZOB	LOK	WAH
1	(Qatar) Al-Duhail	6	6	0	0	13	6	+7	18	Advance to knockout stage	—	3–1	3–2	1–0
2	(Iran) Zob Ahan	6	2	1	3	6	8	−2	7 (Note: Head-to-head results: Zob Ahan 2–0 Lokomotiv Tashkent, Lokomotiv Tashkent 1–1 Zob Ahan.)	Advance to knockout stage	0–1	—	2–0	2–0
3	(Uzbekistan) Lokomotiv Tashkent	6	2	1	3	13	9	+4	7		1–2	1–1	—	5–0
4	(United Arab Emirates) Al-Wahda	6	1	0	5	6	15	−9	3		2–3	3–0	1–4	—

Source: AFC

=== Group C ===
Pos	Team	Pld	W	D	L	GF	GA	GD	Pts	Qualification	PER	SAD	NSF	WAS
1	(Iran) Persepolis	6	4	1	1	8	3	+5	13	Advance to knockout stage	—	1–0	3–0	2–0
2	(Qatar) Al-Sadd	6	4	0	2	11	5	+6	12	Advance to knockout stage	3–1	—	4–0	2–1
3	(Uzbekistan) Nasaf Qarshi	6	3	1	2	4	8	−4	10		0–0	1–0	—	1–0
4	(United Arab Emirates) Al-Wasl	6	0	0	6	3	10	−7	0		0–1	1–2	1–2	—

Source: AFC

=== Group D ===
Pos	Team	Pld	W	D	L	GF	GA	GD	Pts	Qualification	EST	AIN	RAY	HIL
1	(Iran) Esteghlal	6	3	3	0	9	5	+4	12	Advance to knockout stage	—	1–1	2–0	1–0
2	(United Arab Emirates) Al-Ain	6	2	4	0	10	6	+4	10	Advance to knockout stage	2–2	—	1–1	2–1
3	(Qatar) Al-Rayyan	6	1	3	2	7	11	−4	6		2–2	1–4	—	2–1
4	(Saudi Arabia) Al-Hilal	6	0	2	4	3	7	−4	2		0–1	0–0	1–1	—

Source: AFC

=== Group E ===
Pos	Team	Pld	W	D	L	GF	GA	GD	Pts	Qualification	JEO	TJQ	KSW	KIT
1	(South Korea) Jeonbuk Hyundai Motors	6	5	0	1	22	9	+13	15	Advance to knockout stage	—	6–3	3–2	3–0
2	(China) Tianjin Quanjian	6	4	1	1	15	11	+4	13	Advance to knockout stage	4–2	—	3–2	3–0
3	(Japan) Kashiwa Reysol	6	1	1	4	6	10	−4	4		0–2	1–1	—	1–0
4	(Hong Kong) Kitchee	6	1	0	5	1	14	−13	3		0–6	0–1	1–0	—

Source: AFC

=== Group F ===
Pos	Team	Pld	W	D	L	GF	GA	GD	Pts	Qualification	SSI	ULS	MEL	KAW
1	(China) Shanghai SIPG	6	3	2	1	10	6	+4	11	Advance to knockout stage	—	2–2	4–1	1–1
2	(South Korea) Ulsan Hyundai	6	2	3	1	15	11	+4	9	Advance to knockout stage	0–1	—	6–2	2–1
3	(Australia) Melbourne Victory	6	2	2	2	11	16	−5	8		2–1	3–3	—	1–0
4	(Japan) Kawasaki Frontale	6	0	3	3	6	9	−3	3		0–1	2–2	2–2	—

Source: AFC

=== Group G ===
Pos	Team	Pld	W	D	L	GF	GA	GD	Pts	Qualification	GZE	BUR	CER	JEJ
1	(China) Guangzhou Evergrande	6	3	3	0	12	6	+6	12	Advance to knockout stage	—	1–1	3–1	5–3
2	(Thailand) Buriram United	6	2	3	1	7	6	+1	9	Advance to knockout stage	1–1	—	2–0	0–2
3	(Japan) Cerezo Osaka	6	2	2	2	6	8	−2	8		0–0	2–2	—	2–1
4	(South Korea) Jeju United	6	1	0	5	6	11	−5	3		0–2	0–1	0–1	—

Source: AFC

=== Group H ===
Pos	Team	Pld	W	D	L	GF	GA	GD	Pts	Qualification	SSB	KAS	SYD	SSH
1	(South Korea) Suwon Samsung Bluewings	6	3	1	2	8	7	+1	10	Advance to knockout stage	—	1–2	1–4	1–1
2	(Japan) Kashima Antlers	6	2	3	1	8	6	+2	9	Advance to knockout stage	0–1	—	1–1	1–1
3	(Australia) Sydney FC	6	1	3	2	7	8	−1	6		0–2	0–2	—	0–0
4	(China) Shanghai Shenhua	6	0	5	1	6	8	−2	5		0–2	2–2	2–2	—

Source: AFC

== Knockout stage ==
In the knockout stage, the 16 teams played a single-elimination tournament, with the teams split into the two regions until the final. Each tie was played on a home-and-away two-legged basis. The away goals rule, extra time (away goals do not apply in extra time) and penalty shoot-out were used to decide the winner if necessary (Regulations Article 11.3).

=== Bracket ===
The bracket was decided after the draw for the quarter-finals, which was held on 23 May 2018, 16:00 MYT (UTC+8), at the AFC House in Kuala Lumpur, Malaysia.

Round of 16	Quarter-finals
(Japan) Kashima Antlers	3	1	4
(China) Shanghai SIPG	1	2	3
(Japan) Kashima Antlers	2	3	5
(China) Tianjin Quanjian	0	0	0
(China) Tianjin Quanjian (a)	0	2	2
(China) Guangzhou Evergrande	0	2	2
East Region
(Thailand) Buriram United	3	0	3
(South Korea) Jeonbuk Hyundai Motors	2	2	4
(South Korea) Jeonbuk Hyundai Motors	0	3	3 (2)
(South Korea) Suwon Samsung Bluewings (p)	3	0	3 (4)
(South Korea) Ulsan Hyundai	1	0	1
(South Korea) Suwon Samsung Bluewings	0	3	3
(Iran) Zob Ahan	1	1	2
(Iran) Esteghlal	0	3	3
(Iran) Esteghlal	1	2	3
(Qatar) Al-Sadd	3	2	5
(Qatar) Al-Sadd	2	2	4
(Saudi Arabia) Al-Ahli	1	2	3
West Region
(United Arab Emirates) Al-Ain	2	1	3
(Qatar) Al-Duhail	4	4	8
(Qatar) Al-Duhail	1	1	2
(Iran) Persepolis	0	3	3
(United Arab Emirates) Al-Jazira	3	1	4
(Iran) Persepolis (a)	2	2	4

Semi-finals
(Japan) Kashima Antlers	3	3	6
(South Korea) Suwon Samsung Bluewings	2	3	5
(Qatar) Al-Sadd	0	1	1
(Iran) Persepolis	1	1	2

Final
(Japan) Kashima Antlers	2	0	2
(Iran) Persepolis	0	0	0

=== Round of 16 ===
In the round of 16, the winners of one group played the runners-up of another group from the same region, with the group winners hosting the second leg, and the matchups determined by the group stage draw.

West Region
Team 1	Agg.	Team 2	1st leg	2nd leg
Al-Jazira (United Arab Emirates)	4–4 (a)	(Iran) Persepolis	3–2	1–2
Al-Sadd (Qatar)	4–3	(Saudi Arabia) Al-Ahli	2–1	2–2
Zob Ahan (Iran)	2–3	(Iran) Esteghlal	1–0	1–3
Al-Ain (United Arab Emirates)	3–8	(Qatar) Al-Duhail	2–4	1–4

East Region
Team 1	Agg.	Team 2	1st leg	2nd leg
Tianjin Quanjian (China)	2–2 (a)	(China) Guangzhou Evergrande	0–0	2–2
Buriram United (Thailand)	3–4	(South Korea) Jeonbuk Hyundai Motors	3–2	0–2
Ulsan Hyundai (South Korea)	1–3	(South Korea) Suwon Samsung Bluewings	1–0	0–3
Kashima Antlers (Japan)	4–3	(China) Shanghai SIPG	3–1	1–2

=== Quarter-finals ===
The draw for the quarter-finals was held on 23 May 2018. In the quarter-finals, the four teams from the West Region played in two ties, and the four teams from the East Region played in two ties, with the matchups and order of legs decided by draw, without any seeding or country protection.

West Region
Team 1	Agg.	Team 2	1st leg	2nd leg
Esteghlal (Iran)	3–5	(Qatar) Al-Sadd	1–3	2–2
Al-Duhail (Qatar)	2–3	(Iran) Persepolis	1–0	1–3

East Region
Team 1	Agg.	Team 2	1st leg	2nd leg
Kashima Antlers (Japan)	5–0	(China) Tianjin Quanjian	2–0	3–0
Jeonbuk Hyundai Motors (South Korea)	3–3 (2–4 p)	(South Korea) Suwon Samsung Bluewings	0–3	3–0 (a.e.t.)

=== Semi-finals ===
In the semi-finals, the two quarter-final winners from the West Region played each other, and the two quarter-final winners from the East Region played each other, with the order of legs determined by the quarter-final draw.

West Region
Team 1	Agg.	Team 2	1st leg	2nd leg
Al-Sadd (Qatar)	1–2	(Iran) Persepolis	0–1	1–1

East Region
Team 1	Agg.	Team 2	1st leg	2nd leg
Kashima Antlers (Japan)	6–5	(South Korea) Suwon Samsung Bluewings	3–2	3–3

=== Final ===
In the final, the two semi-final winners played each other, with the order of legs (first leg hosted by team from the East Region, second leg hosted by team from the West Region) reversed from the previous season's final.

3 November 2018
15:00 UTC+9

Kashima Antlers (Japan)	2–0	(Iran) Persepolis
Léo Silva 58'; Serginho 70'	Live Report; Stats Report

Kashima Soccer Stadium, Kashima
Attendance: 35,022
Referee: Ma Ning (China)
10 November 2018
18:30 UTC+3:30

Persepolis (Iran)	0–0	(Japan) Kashima Antlers
	Live Report; Stats Report

Azadi Stadium, Tehran
Attendance: 100,000
Referee: Ahmed Al-Kaf (Oman)

Kashima Antlers won 2–0 on aggregate.

== Awards ==
=== Main awards ===
Award	Player	Team
Most Valuable Player	(Japan) Yuma Suzuki	(Japan) Kashima Antlers
Top Goalscorer	(Algeria) Baghdad Bounedjah	(Qatar) Al-Sadd
Fair Play Award	—	(Iran) Persepolis
Best Goal	(Hong Kong) Cheng Chin Lung	(Hong Kong) Kitchee

=== All-Star Squad ===
Position	Player	Team
Goalkeeper	(South Korea) Kwoun Sun-tae	(Japan) Kashima Antlers
Goalkeeper	(Iran) Alireza Beiranvand	(Iran) Persepolis
Goalkeeper	(South Korea) Shin Hwa-yong	(South Korea) Suwon Samsung Bluewings
Defenders	(Qatar) Abdelkarim Hassan	(Qatar) Al-Sadd
Defenders	(Iran) Rouzbeh Cheshmi	(Iran) Esteghlal
Defenders	(Japan) Gen Shoji	(Japan) Kashima Antlers
Defenders	(Iran) Jalal Hosseini	(Iran) Persepolis
Defenders	(South Korea) Jung Seung-hyun	(Japan) Kashima Antlers
Midfielders	(South Korea) Nam Tae-hee	(Qatar) Al-Duhail
Midfielders	(Brazil) Léo Silva	(Japan) Kashima Antlers
Midfielders	(Spain) Xavi	(Qatar) Al-Sadd
Midfielders	(Iran) Kamal Kamyabinia	(Iran) Persepolis
Midfielders	(Japan) Kento Misao	(Japan) Kashima Antlers
Midfielders	(Iraq) Bashar Resan	(Iran) Persepolis
Midfielders	(South Korea) Park Jong-woo	(South Korea) Suwon Samsung Bluewings
Midfielders	(Bosnia and Herzegovina) Elvis Sarić	(South Korea) Suwon Samsung Bluewings
Forwards	(Japan) Yuma Suzuki	(Japan) Kashima Antlers
Forwards	(Nigeria) Godwin Mensha	(Iran) Persepolis
Forwards	(Brazil) Serginho	(Japan) Kashima Antlers
Forwards	(South Korea) Kim Shin-wook	(South Korea) Jeonbuk Hyundai Motors
Forwards	(Iran) Ali Alipour	(Iran) Persepolis
Forwards	(Brazil) Alexandre Pato	(China) Tianjin Quanjian
Forwards	(Montenegro) Dejan Damjanović	(South Korea) Suwon Samsung Bluewings
Forwards	(Algeria) Baghdad Bounedjah	(Qatar) Al-Sadd

=== Opta Best XI ===
Position	Player	Team
Goalkeeper	(Iran) Alireza Beiranvand	(Iran) Persepolis
Defenders	(China) Li Xuepeng	(China) Guangzhou Evergrande
Defenders	(Iran) Shoja' Khalilzadeh	(Iran) Persepolis
Defenders	(Iran) Jalal Hosseini	(Iran) Persepolis
Defenders	(South Korea) Lee Yong	(South Korea) Jeonbuk Hyundai Motors
Midfielders	(Brazil) Ricardo Goulart	(China) Guangzhou Evergrande
Midfielders	(Spain) Xavi	(Qatar) Al-Sadd
Midfielders	(Brazil) Serginho	(Japan) Kashima Antlers
Forwards	(Montenegro) Dejan Damjanović	(South Korea) Suwon Samsung Bluewings
Forwards	(Algeria) Baghdad Bounedjah	(Qatar) Al-Sadd
Forwards	(Morocco) Youssef El-Arabi	(Qatar) Al-Duhail

=== Fans' Best XI ===
Position	Player	Team
Goalkeeper	(Iran) Alireza Beiranvand	(Iran) Persepolis
Defenders	(Qatar) Abdelkarim Hassan	(Qatar) Al-Sadd
Defenders	(Iran) Shoja' Khalilzadeh	(Iran) Persepolis
Defenders	(Qatar) Ró-Ró	(Qatar) Al-Sadd
Defenders	(Iran) Voria Ghafouri	(Iran) Esteghlal
Midfielders	(Iran) Farshid Esmaeili	(Iran) Esteghlal
Midfielders	(Spain) Xavi	(Qatar) Al-Sadd
Midfielders	(Iran) Siamak Nemati	(Iran) Persepolis
Forwards	(Iran) Ali Alipour	(Iran) Persepolis
Forwards	(Algeria) Baghdad Bounedjah	(Qatar) Al-Sadd
Forwards	(Senegal) Mame Baba Thiam	(Iran) Esteghlal

== Top scorers ==
Team eliminated / inactive for this round.
Player was not in the team but team still active for this round.

Rank	Player	Team	MD1	MD2	MD3	MD4	MD5	MD6	2R1	2R2	QF1	QF2	SF1	SF2	F1	F2	Total
1	(Algeria) Baghdad Bounedjah	(Qatar) Al-Sadd	2	2		1	2			2	2	1		1			13
2	(Montenegro) Dejan Damjanović	(South Korea) Suwon Samsung Bluewings	2			1	1	1			2		1	1			9
2	(Morocco) Youssef El-Arabi	(Qatar) Al-Duhail		2	2	2			1	2							9
4	(Senegal) Mame Baba Thiam	(Iran) Esteghlal		1	2	1				3							7
4	(Brazil) Ricardo Goulart	(China) Guangzhou Evergrande	1		4					2							7
6	(Sweden) Marcus Berg	(United Arab Emirates) Al-Ain		1	1		2	2									6
6	(South Korea) Kim Shin-wook	(South Korea) Jeonbuk Hyundai Motors			3	1		1				1					6
6	(Brazil) Romarinho	(United Arab Emirates) Al-Jazira	1			1	1	1	1	1							6
9	(Brazil) Adriano	(South Korea) Jeonbuk Hyundai Motors		3		1						1					5
9	(Iran) Morteza Tabrizi	(Iran) Zob Ahan (GS & R16) (Iran) Esteghlal (QF)		1	2			1				1					5
9	(Brazil) Serginho	(Japan) Kashima Antlers									1	1	1	1	1		5
9	(United Arab Emirates) Ali Mabkhout	(United Arab Emirates) Al-Jazira	1	1			2		1								5
9	(Saudi Arabia) Muhannad Assiri	(Saudi Arabia) Al-Ahli	1	1			1		1	1							5
9	(Iran) Mehdi Taremi	(Qatar) Al-Gharafa	1	2		1		1									5
9	(Iran) Ali Alipour	(Iran) Persepolis	2		1				1				1				5

Note: Goals scored in the qualifying play-offs are not counted when determining top scorer (Regulations Article 64.4).

Source: AFC

== Player of the week awards ==
Matchday	Toyota Player of the Week	
Matchday	Player	Team
Group stage
Matchday 1	(Netherlands) Leroy George	(Australia) Melbourne Victory
Matchday 2	(Brazil) Oscar	(China) Shanghai SIPG
Matchday 3	(Brazil) Ricardo Goulart	(China) Guangzhou Evergrande
Matchday 4	(United Arab Emirates) Ali Khasif	(United Arab Emirates) Al-Jazira
Matchday 5	(Croatia) Mislav Oršić	(South Korea) Ulsan Hyundai
Matchday 6	(Brazil) Alan	(China) Guangzhou Evergrande
Knockout stage
Round of 16 1st leg	(Brazil) Edgar	(Thailand) Buriram United
Round of 16 2nd leg	(Senegal) Mame Baba Thiam	(Iran) Esteghlal
Quarter-finals 1st leg	(Montenegro) Dejan Damjanović	(South Korea) Suwon Samsung Bluewings
Quarter-finals 2nd leg	(Qatar) Akram Afif	(Qatar) Al-Sadd
Semi-finals 1st leg	(Iran) Alireza Beiranvand	(Iran) Persepolis
Semi-finals 2nd leg	(Montenegro) Dejan Damjanović	(South Korea) Suwon Samsung Bluewings
Final 1st leg	(Brazil) Serginho	(Japan) Kashima Antlers
Final 2nd leg	(South Korea) Kwoun Sun-tae	(Japan) Kashima Antlers

== See also ==
- 2018 AFC Cup
- 2018 FIFA Club World Cup
