= 2018 AFC Champions League knockout stage =

Football tournament knockout stage

The 2018 AFC Champions League knockout stage was played from 7 May to 10 November 2018. A total of 16 teams competed in the knockout stage to decide the champions of the 2018 AFC Champions League.

== Qualified teams ==
The winners and runners-up of each of the eight groups in the group stage advanced to the round of 16, with both West Region (Groups A–D) and East Region (Groups E–H) having eight qualified teams.

Region	Group	Winners	Runners-up
West Region	A	(Saudi Arabia) Al-Ahli	(United Arab Emirates) Al-Jazira
West Region	B	(Qatar) Al-Duhail	(Iran) Zob Ahan
West Region	C	(Iran) Persepolis	(Qatar) Al-Sadd
West Region	D	(Iran) Esteghlal	(United Arab Emirates) Al-Ain
East Region	E	(South Korea) Jeonbuk Hyundai Motors	(China) Tianjin Quanjian
East Region	F	(China) Shanghai SIPG	(South Korea) Ulsan Hyundai
East Region	G	(China) Guangzhou Evergrande	(Thailand) Buriram United
East Region	H	(South Korea) Suwon Samsung Bluewings	(Japan) Kashima Antlers

== Format ==
In the knockout stage, the 16 teams played a single-elimination tournament, with the teams split into the two regions until the final. Each tie was played on a home-and-away two-legged basis. The away goals rule, extra time (away goals do not apply in extra time) and penalty shoot-out were used to decide the winner if necessary (Regulations Article 11.3).

== Schedule ==
The schedule of each round was as follows. Matches in the West Region were played on Mondays and Tuesdays, while matches in the East Region were played on Tuesdays and Wednesdays.

Round	First leg	Second leg
Round of 16	7–9 May 2018	14–16 May 2018
Quarter-finals	27–29 August 2018	17–19 September 2018
Semi-finals	2–3 October 2018	23–24 October 2018
Final	3 November 2018	10 November 2018

== Bracket ==
The bracket of the knockout stage was determined as follows:

Round	Matchups
Round of 16	(Group winners host second leg) West Region: Runner-up Group A vs. Winner Group C; Runner-up Group C vs. Winner Group A; Runner-up Group B vs. Winner Group D; Runner-up Group D vs. Winner Group B; East Region: Runner-up Group E vs. Winner Group G; Runner-up Group G vs. Winner Group E; Runner-up Group F vs. Winner Group H; Runner-up Group H vs. Winner Group F
Quarter-finals	(Matchups and order of legs decided by draw, involving four round of 16 winners each in West Region and East Region) West Region: QF1; QF2; East Region: QF3; QF4
Semi-finals	(Winners QF1 and QF3 host first leg, Winners QF2 and QF4 host second leg) West Region: SF1: Winner QF1 vs. Winner QF2; East Region: SF2: Winner QF3 vs. Winner QF4
Final	(Winner SF2 host first leg, Winner SF1 host second leg, as reversed from previous season's final): Winner SF1 vs. Winner SF2

The bracket was decided after the draw for the quarter-finals, which was held on 23 May 2018, 16:00 MYT (UTC+8), at the AFC House in Kuala Lumpur, Malaysia.

Round of 16	Quarter-finals
(Japan) Kashima Antlers	3	1	4
(China) Shanghai SIPG	1	2	3
(Japan) Kashima Antlers	2	3	5
(China) Tianjin Quanjian	0	0	0
(China) Tianjin Quanjian (a)	0	2	2
(China) Guangzhou Evergrande	0	2	2
East Region
(Thailand) Buriram United	3	0	3
(South Korea) Jeonbuk Hyundai Motors	2	2	4
(South Korea) Jeonbuk Hyundai Motors	0	3	3 (2)
(South Korea) Suwon Samsung Bluewings (p)	3	0	3 (4)
(South Korea) Ulsan Hyundai	1	0	1
(South Korea) Suwon Samsung Bluewings	0	3	3
(Iran) Zob Ahan	1	1	2
(Iran) Esteghlal	0	3	3
(Iran) Esteghlal	1	2	3
(Qatar) Al-Sadd	3	2	5
(Qatar) Al-Sadd	2	2	4
(Saudi Arabia) Al-Ahli	1	2	3
West Region
(United Arab Emirates) Al-Ain	2	1	3
(Qatar) Al-Duhail	4	4	8
(Qatar) Al-Duhail	1	1	2
(Iran) Persepolis	0	3	3
(United Arab Emirates) Al-Jazira	3	1	4
(Iran) Persepolis (a)	2	2	4

Semi-finals
(Japan) Kashima Antlers	3	3	6
(South Korea) Suwon Samsung Bluewings	2	3	5
(Qatar) Al-Sadd	0	1	1
(Iran) Persepolis	1	1	2

Final
(Japan) Kashima Antlers	2	0	2
(Iran) Persepolis	0	0	0

== Round of 16 ==
=== Summary ===
In the round of 16, the winners of one group played the runners-up of another group from the same region, with the group winners hosting the second leg, and the matchups determined by the group stage draw.

West Region
Team 1	Agg.	Team 2	1st leg	2nd leg
Al-Jazira (United Arab Emirates)	4–4 (a)	(Iran) Persepolis	3–2	1–2
Al-Sadd (Qatar)	4–3	(Saudi Arabia) Al-Ahli	2–1	2–2
Zob Ahan (Iran)	2–3	(Iran) Esteghlal	1–0	1–3
Al-Ain (United Arab Emirates)	3–8	(Qatar) Al-Duhail	2–4	1–4

East Region
Team 1	Agg.	Team 2	1st leg	2nd leg
Tianjin Quanjian (China)	2–2 (a)	(China) Guangzhou Evergrande	0–0	2–2
Buriram United (Thailand)	3–4	(South Korea) Jeonbuk Hyundai Motors	3–2	0–2
Ulsan Hyundai (South Korea)	1–3	(South Korea) Suwon Samsung Bluewings	1–0	0–3
Kashima Antlers (Japan)	4–3	(China) Shanghai SIPG	3–1	1–2

=== West Region ===
7 May 2018
19:30 UTC+4

Al-Jazira (United Arab Emirates)	3–2	(Iran) Persepolis
Mabkhout 52'; Romarinho 77'; Al-Hammadi 90+6'	Live Report; Stats Report	Alipour 42'; Mensha 84' (pen.)

Mohammed bin Zayed Stadium, Abu Dhabi
Attendance: 5,821
Referee: Hiroyuki Kimura (Japan)
14 May 2018
19:30 UTC+4:30

Persepolis (Iran)	2–1	(United Arab Emirates) Al-Jazira
Nourollahi 63'; Hosseini 89'	Live Report; Stats Report	Romarinho 70'

Azadi Stadium, Tehran
Attendance: 80,000
Referee: Ma Ning (China)

4–4 on aggregate. Persepolis won on away goals.

7 May 2018
19:15 UTC+3

Al-Sadd (Qatar)	2–1	(Saudi Arabia) Al-Ahli
Khoukhi 3', 28'	Live Report; Stats Report	Assiri 47'

Jassim bin Hamad Stadium, Al Rayyan
Attendance: 3,613
Referee: Chris Beath (Australia)
14 May 2018
20:40 UTC+3

Al-Ahli (Saudi Arabia)	2–2	(Qatar) Al-Sadd
Claudemir 9'; Assiri 39'	Live Report; Stats Report	Bounedjah 2', 70'

King Abdullah Sports City, Jeddah
Attendance: 24,150
Referee: Fu Ming (China)

Al-Sadd won 4–3 on aggregate.

8 May 2018
19:15 UTC+4:30

Zob Ahan (Iran)	1–0	(Iran) Esteghlal
Gvelesiani 90+3' (pen.)	Live Report; Stats Report

Foolad Shahr Stadium, Isfahan
Attendance: 10,160
Referee: Jumpei Iida (Japan)
15 May 2018
20:45 UTC+4:30

Esteghlal (Iran)	3–1	(Iran) Zob Ahan
Thiam 11' (pen.), 41', 64'	Live Report; Stats Report	Haddadifar 65'

Azadi Stadium, Tehran
Attendance: 75,680
Referee: Ahmed Al-Kaf (Oman)

Esteghlal won 3–2 on aggregate.

8 May 2018
20:10 UTC+4

Al-Ain (United Arab Emirates)	2–4	(Qatar) Al-Duhail
Khalil 68'; Diaky 86'	Live Report; Stats Report	El-Arabi 16'; Nam Tae-hee 39'; Mohammad 48'; Ali 55'

Hazza bin Zayed Stadium, Al Ain
Attendance: 7,124
Referee: Hettikamkanamge Perera (Sri Lanka)
15 May 2018
18:30 UTC+3

Al-Duhail (Qatar)	4–1	(United Arab Emirates) Al-Ain
M. Ahmed 12' (o.g.); El-Arabi 30', 86' (pen.); Mohammad 54'	Live Report; Stats Report	O. Abdulrahman 90+4' (pen.)

Abdullah bin Khalifa Stadium, Doha
Attendance: 6,853
Referee: Muhammad Taqi (Singapore)

Al-Duhail won 8–3 on aggregate.

=== East Region ===
8 May 2018
19:30 UTC+8

Tianjin Quanjian (China)	0–0	(China) Guangzhou Evergrande
	Live Report; Stats Report

Tianjin Olympic Center Stadium, Tianjin
Attendance: 23,508
Referee: Valentin Kovalenko (Uzbekistan)
15 May 2018
20:00 UTC+8

Guangzhou Evergrande (China)	2–2	(China) Tianjin Quanjian
Goulart 17', 48'	Live Report; Stats Report	Pato 19'; Wang Jie 52'

Tianhe Stadium, Guangzhou
Attendance: 48,632
Referee: Abdulrahman Al-Jassim (Qatar)

2–2 on aggregate. Tianjin Quanjian won on away goals.

8 May 2018
18:00 UTC+7

Buriram United (Thailand)	3–2	(South Korea) Jeonbuk Hyundai Motors
Edgar 6', 69'; Diogo 60'	Live Report; Stats Report	Lopes 50'; Son Jun-ho 90+1'

Chang Arena, Buriram
Attendance: 10,382
Referee: Khamis Al-Marri (Qatar)
15 May 2018
19:00 UTC+9

Jeonbuk Hyundai Motors (South Korea)	2–0	(Thailand) Buriram United
Lopes 18'; Lee Jae-sung 84'	Live Report; Stats Report

Jeonju World Cup Stadium, Jeonju
Attendance: 11,218
Referee: Nawaf Shukralla (Bahrain)

Jeonbuk Hyundai Motors won 4–3 on aggregate.

9 May 2018
20:00 UTC+9

Ulsan Hyundai (South Korea)	1–0	(South Korea) Suwon Samsung Bluewings
Kim In-sung 67'	Live Report; Stats Report

Ulsan Munsu Football Stadium, Ulsan
Attendance: 1,648
Referee: Mohanad Qassim (Iraq)
16 May 2018
20:00 UTC+9

Suwon Samsung Bluewings (South Korea)	3–0	(South Korea) Ulsan Hyundai
Kim Gun-hee 26', 31'; Waguininho 90+1'	Live Report; Stats Report

Suwon World Cup Stadium, Suwon
Attendance: 3,176
Referee: Chris Beath (Australia)

Suwon Samsung Bluewings won 3–1 on aggregate.

9 May 2018
19:00 UTC+9

Kashima Antlers (Japan)	3–1	(China) Shanghai SIPG
Suzuki 43'; Nishi 49'; Yu Hai 75' (o.g.)	Live Report; Stats Report	Elkeson 77'

Kashima Soccer Stadium, Kashima
Attendance: 8,860
Referee: Ilgiz Tantashev (Uzbekistan)
16 May 2018
20:00 UTC+8

Shanghai SIPG (China)	2–1	(Japan) Kashima Antlers
Hulk 7', 81' (pen.)	Live Report; Stats Report	Doi 42'

Shanghai Stadium, Shanghai
Attendance: 19,697
Referee: Mohammed Abdulla (United Arab Emirates)

Kashima Antlers won 4–3 on aggregate.

== Quarter-finals ==
=== Summary ===
The draw for the quarter-finals was held on 23 May 2018. In the quarter-finals, the four teams from the West Region played in two ties, and the four teams from the East Region played in two ties, with the matchups and order of legs decided by draw, without any seeding or country protection.

West Region
Team 1	Agg.	Team 2	1st leg	2nd leg
Esteghlal (Iran)	3–5	(Qatar) Al-Sadd	1–3	2–2
Al-Duhail (Qatar)	2–3	(Iran) Persepolis	1–0	1–3

East Region
Team 1	Agg.	Team 2	1st leg	2nd leg
Kashima Antlers (Japan)	5–0	(China) Tianjin Quanjian	2–0	3–0
Jeonbuk Hyundai Motors (South Korea)	3–3 (2–4 p)	(South Korea) Suwon Samsung Bluewings	0–3	3–0 (a.e.t.)

=== West Region ===
27 August 2018
20:30 UTC+4:30

Esteghlal (Iran)	1–3	(Qatar) Al-Sadd
Khoukhi 12' (o.g.)	Live Report; Stats Report	Afif 60'; Bounedjah 65', 74' (pen.)

Azadi Stadium, Tehran
Attendance: 78,116
Referee: Ma Ning (China)
17 September 2018
19:00 UTC+3

Al-Sadd (Qatar)	2–2	(Iran) Esteghlal
Afif 27'; Bounedjah 90+2' (pen.)	Live Report; Stats Report	Bagheri 32'; Tabrizi 49'

Jassim bin Hamad Stadium, Al Rayyan
Attendance: 6,462
Referee: Muhammad Taqi (Singapore)

Al-Sadd won 5–3 on aggregate.

28 August 2018
18:30 UTC+3

Al-Duhail (Qatar)	1–0	(Iran) Persepolis
Ali 15'	Live Report; Stats Report

Khalifa International Stadium, Al Rayyan
Attendance: 6,650
Referee: Mohanad Qassim (Iraq)
17 September 2018
18:30 UTC+4:30

Persepolis (Iran)	3–1	(Qatar) Al-Duhail
Hosseini 57'; Al-Brake 76' (o.g.); Mensha 78'	Live Report; Stats Report	Boudiaf 33'

Azadi Stadium, Tehran
Attendance: 71,312
Referee: Ravshan Irmatov (Uzbekistan)

Persepolis won 3–2 on aggregate.

=== East Region ===
28 August 2018
19:00 UTC+9

Kashima Antlers (Japan)	2–0	(China) Tianjin Quanjian
Léo Silva 60'; Serginho 72'	Live Report; Stats Report

Kashima Soccer Stadium, Kashima
Attendance: 13,634
Referee: Adham Makhadmeh (Jordan)
18 September 2018
19:30 UTC+8

Tianjin Quanjian (China)	0–3	(Japan) Kashima Antlers
	Live Report; Stats Report	Serginho 13'; Abe 27'; Doi 66'

Estádio Campo Desportivo, Macau (Note: The Tianjin Quanjian v Kashima Antlers match was played in Estádio Campo Desportivo, Macau instead of Tianjin Olympic Center Stadium, Tianjin.)
Attendance: 8,718
Referee: Chris Beath (Australia)

Kashima Antlers won 5–0 on aggregate.

29 August 2018
19:00 UTC+9

Jeonbuk Hyundai Motors (South Korea)	0–3	(South Korea) Suwon Samsung Bluewings
	Live Report; Stats Report	Damjanović 75', 82'; Han Eui-kwon 85'

Jeonju World Cup Stadium, Jeonju
Attendance: 9,385
Referee: Mohammed Abdulla Hassan Mohamed (United Arab Emirates)
19 September 2018
19:00 UTC+9

Suwon Samsung Bluewings (South Korea)	0–3 (a.e.t.)	(South Korea) Jeonbuk Hyundai Motors
	Live Report; Stats Report	Adriano 11'; Choi Bo-kyung 51'; Kim Shin-wook 71'
Penalties
Damjanović (penalty scored); Lee Ki-je (penalty scored); Jo Sung-jin (penalty scored); Sarić (penalty scored)	4–2	(penalty missed) Kim Shin-wook; (penalty scored) Adriano; (penalty missed) Lee Dong-gook; (penalty scored) Kim Min-jae

Suwon World Cup Stadium, Suwon
Attendance: 8,028
Referee: Alireza Faghani (Iran)

3–3 on aggregate. Suwon Samsung Bluewings won 4–2 on penalties.

== Semi-finals ==
=== Summary ===
In the semi-finals, the two quarter-final winners from the West Region played each other, and the two quarter-final winners from the East Region played each other, with the order of legs determined by the quarter-final draw.

West Region
Team 1	Agg.	Team 2	1st leg	2nd leg
Al-Sadd (Qatar)	1–2	(Iran) Persepolis	0–1	1–1

East Region
Team 1	Agg.	Team 2	1st leg	2nd leg
Kashima Antlers (Japan)	6–5	(South Korea) Suwon Samsung Bluewings	3–2	3–3

=== West Region ===
2 October 2018
18:15 UTC+3

Al-Sadd (Qatar)	0–1	(Iran) Persepolis
	Live Report; Stats Report	Alipour 86' (pen.)

Jassim bin Hamad Stadium, Al Rayyan
Attendance: 9,087
Referee: Hettikamkanamge Perera (Sri Lanka)
23 October 2018
18:30 UTC+3:30

Persepolis (Iran)	1–1	(Qatar) Al-Sadd
Nemati 49'	Live Report; Stats Report	Bounedjah 17'

Azadi Stadium, Tehran
Attendance: 81,350
Referee: Valentin Kovalenko (Uzbekistan)

Persepolis won 2–1 on aggregate.

=== East Region ===
3 October 2018
19:00 UTC+9

Kashima Antlers (Japan)	3–2	(South Korea) Suwon Samsung Bluewings
Jang Ho-ik 21' (o.g.); Serginho 84'; Uchida 90+3'	Live Report; Stats Report	Uchida 2' (o.g.); Damjanović 6'

Kashima Soccer Stadium, Kashima
Attendance: 13,044
Referee: Nawaf Shukralla (Bahrain)
24 October 2018
19:00 UTC+9

Suwon Samsung Bluewings (South Korea)	3–3	(Japan) Kashima Antlers
Lim Sang-hyub 52'; Jo Sung-jin 53'; Damjanović 60'	Live Report; Stats Report	Yamamoto 25'; Nishi 64'; Serginho 82'

Suwon World Cup Stadium, Suwon
Attendance: 10,296
Referee: Mark Geiger (United States)

Kashima Antlers won 6–5 on aggregate.

== Final ==
In the final, the two semi-final winners played each other, with the order of legs (first leg hosted by team from the East Region, second leg hosted by team from the West Region) reversed from the previous season's final.

3 November 2018
15:00 UTC+9

Kashima Antlers (Japan)	2–0	(Iran) Persepolis
Léo Silva 58'; Serginho 70'	Live Report; Stats Report

Kashima Soccer Stadium, Kashima
Attendance: 35,022
Referee: Ma Ning (China)
10 November 2018
18:30 UTC+3:30

Persepolis (Iran)	0–0	(Japan) Kashima Antlers
	Live Report; Stats Report

Azadi Stadium, Tehran
Attendance: 100,000
Referee: Ahmed Al-Kaf (Oman)

Kashima Antlers won 2–0 on aggregate.
