= 2018 AFC Champions League group stage =

Football tournament group stage

The 2018 AFC Champions League group stage was played from 12 February to 18 April 2018. A total of 32 teams competed in the group stage to decide the 16 places in the knockout stage of the 2018 AFC Champions League.

== Draw ==
The draw for the group stage was held on 6 December 2017, 16:30 MYT (UTC+8), at the AFC House in Kuala Lumpur, Malaysia. The 32 teams were drawn into eight groups of four: four groups each in the West Region (Groups A–D) and the East Region (Groups E–H). Teams from the same association could not be drawn into the same group.

The seeding of each team in the draw was determined by their association and their qualifying position within their association. The mechanism of the draw was as follows:

- For the West Region, a draw was held for the three associations with three direct entrants (United Arab Emirates, Iran, Qatar) to determine the seeds 1 placed in order for Groups A, B and C. The remaining teams were then allocated to the groups according to the rules set by AFC.
- For the East Region, a draw was held for the two associations with three direct entrants (South Korea, Japan) to determine the seeds 1 placed in order for Groups E and F. The remaining teams were then allocated to the groups according to the rules set by AFC.

The following 32 teams entered into the group-stage draw, which included the 24 direct entrants and the eight winners of the play-off round of the qualifying play-offs, whose identity was not known at the time of the draw.

Region	Groups	Seed 1	Seed 2	Seed 3	Seed 4
West Region	A–D	(United Arab Emirates) Al-Jazira	(United Arab Emirates) Al-Wahda	(United Arab Emirates) Al-Wasl	(United Arab Emirates) Al-Ain (Play-off West 1)
West Region	A–D	(Iran) Persepolis	(Iran) Esteghlal	(Iran) Tractor Sazi	(Iran) Zob Ahan (Play-off West 2)
West Region	A–D	(Qatar) Al-Duhail	(Qatar) Al-Sadd	(Qatar) Al-Rayyan	(Qatar) Al-Gharafa (Play-off West 3)
West Region	A–D	(Saudi Arabia) Al-Hilal	(Saudi Arabia) Al-Ahli (Note: The seeding of the second group stage team from Saudi Arabia and the first group stage team from Uzbekistan was determined by draw.)	(Uzbekistan) Lokomotiv Tashkent	(Uzbekistan) Nasaf Qarshi (Play-off West 4)
East Region	E–H	(South Korea) Jeonbuk Hyundai Motors	(South Korea) Ulsan Hyundai	(South Korea) Jeju United	(South Korea) Suwon Samsung Bluewings (Play-off East 1)
East Region	E–H	(Japan) Kawasaki Frontale	(Japan) Cerezo Osaka (Note: The identity of the second group stage team from Japan was not known at the time of the draw.)	(Japan) Kashima Antlers	(Japan) Kashiwa Reysol (Play-off East 2)
East Region	E–H	(China) Guangzhou Evergrande	(China) Shanghai Shenhua	(China) Tianjin Quanjian (Play-off East 4)	(China) Shanghai SIPG (Play-off East 3)
East Region	E–H	(Australia) Sydney FC	(Hong Kong) Kitchee (Note: The seeding of the first group stage teams from Thailand and Hong Kong was determined by draw.)	(Australia) Melbourne Victory	(Thailand) Buriram United

== Format ==
In the group stage, each group was played on a home-and-away round-robin basis. The winners and runners-up of each group advanced to the round of 16 of the knockout stage.

=== Tiebreakers ===
The teams were ranked according to points (3 points for a win, 1 point for a draw, 0 points for a loss). If tied on points, tiebreakers were applied in the following order (Regulations Article 10.5):

1. Points in head-to-head matches among tied teams;
2. Goal difference in head-to-head matches among tied teams;
3. Goals scored in head-to-head matches among tied teams;
4. Away goals scored in head-to-head matches among tied teams;
5. If more than two teams are tied, and after applying all head-to-head criteria above, a subset of teams are still tied, all head-to-head criteria above are reapplied exclusively to this subset of teams;
6. Goal difference in all group matches;
7. Goals scored in all group matches;
8. Penalty shoot-out if only two teams are tied and they met in the last round of the group;
9. Disciplinary points (yellow card = 1 point, red card as a result of two yellow cards = 3 points, direct red card = 3 points, yellow card followed by direct red card = 4 points);
10. Team from the higher-ranked association.

== Schedule ==
The schedule of each matchday was as follows.

- Matches in the West Region were played on Mondays and Tuesdays (two groups on each day).
- Matches in the East Region were played on Tuesdays and Wednesdays (two groups on each day).

Matchday	Dates	Matches
Matchday 1	12–14 February 2018	Team 1 vs. Team 4, Team 3 vs. Team 2
Matchday 2	19–21 February 2018	Team 4 vs. Team 3, Team 2 vs. Team 1
Matchday 3	5–7 March 2018	Team 4 vs. Team 2, Team 1 vs. Team 3
Matchday 4	12–14 March 2018	Team 2 vs. Team 4, Team 3 vs. Team 1
Matchday 5	2–4 April 2018	Team 4 vs. Team 1, Team 2 vs. Team 3
Matchday 6	16–18 April 2018	Team 1 vs. Team 2, Team 3 vs. Team 4

=== Neutral venues ===
In light of the deterioration of Iran–Saudi Arabia relations since 2016, which caused matches between teams from Iran and Saudi Arabia to be played on neutral venues in 2016 and 2017, and the Qatar diplomatic crisis since 2017, which led to travel bans imposed by Saudi Arabia and United Arab Emirates to Qatar, the AFC reiterated that matches should be played on a home-and-away basis as normal instead of on neutral venues, and would try to mediate the situation with the concerned associations (Iran, Qatar, Saudi Arabia, United Arab Emirates), such that a solution could be found regarding matches between teams from Iran/Qatar and Saudi Arabia/United Arab Emirates. In the end, the same arrangements were made as of the previous season, where matches between Iran and Saudi Arabia were played on neutral venues, while teams from Saudi Arabia and United Arab Emirates must travel to Qatar to play away matches.

== Groups ==
=== Group A ===
Pos	Team	Pld	W	D	L	GF	GA	GD	Pts	Qualification	AHL	JAZ	GHA	TRA
1	(Saudi Arabia) Al-Ahli	6	4	2	0	9	4	+5	14	Advance to knockout stage	—	2–1	1–1	2–0
2	(United Arab Emirates) Al-Jazira	6	2	2	2	9	9	0	8 (Note: Head-to-head results: Al-Jazira 3–2 Al-Gharafa, Al-Gharafa 2–3 Al-Jazira.)	Advance to knockout stage	1–2	—	3–2	0–0
3	(Qatar) Al-Gharafa	6	2	2	2	12	9	+3	8		1–1	2–3	—	3–0
4	(Iran) Tractor Sazi	6	0	2	4	2	10	−8	2		0–1	1–1	1–3	—

Source: AFC
Rules for classification: Group stage tiebreakers
Notes:
12 February 2018
19:30 UTC+4

Al-Jazira (United Arab Emirates)	3–2	(Qatar) Al-Gharafa
Romarinho 10'; Mabkhout 27'; Al Attas 69'	Live Report; Stats Report	Taremi 11'; Sneijder 71'

Mohammed bin Zayed Stadium, Abu Dhabi
Attendance: 4,138
Referee: Peter Green (Australia)
12 February 2018
19:30 UTC+4

Tractor Sazi (Iran)	0–1	(Saudi Arabia) Al-Ahli
	Live Report; Stats Report	Assiri 67'

Al-Seeb Stadium, Seeb (Oman) (Note: Matches between teams from Iran and Saudi Arabia are played on neutral venues due to deterioration of Iran–Saudi Arabia relations.)
Attendance: 1,253
Referee: Jumpei Iida (Japan)

19 February 2018
18:00 UTC+3

Al-Gharafa (Qatar)	3–0	(Iran) Tractor Sazi
Taremi 11', 90+4'; Gregov 21' (o.g.)	Live Report; Stats Report

Thani bin Jassim Stadium, Al Rayyan
Attendance: 2,833
Referee: Liu Kwok Man (Hong Kong)
19 February 2018
20:10 UTC+3

Al-Ahli (Saudi Arabia)	2–1	(United Arab Emirates) Al-Jazira
Al-Jassim 10'; Assiri 70' (pen.)	Live Report; Stats Report	Mabkhout 89'

King Abdullah Sports City, Jeddah
Attendance: 14,477
Referee: Hettikamkanamge Perera (Sri Lanka)

5 March 2018
19:00 UTC+4

Al-Jazira (United Arab Emirates)	0–0	(Iran) Tractor Sazi
	Live Report; Stats Report

Mohammed bin Zayed Stadium, Abu Dhabi
Attendance: 3,360
Referee: Kim Dong-jin (South Korea)
5 March 2018
18:10 UTC+3

Al-Gharafa (Qatar)	1–1	(Saudi Arabia) Al-Ahli
Quijada 90+1'	Live Report; Stats Report	Balghaith 62'

Thani bin Jassim Stadium, Al Rayyan
Attendance: 7,345
Referee: Valentin Kovalenko (Uzbekistan)

13 March 2018
16:00 UTC+3:30

Tractor Sazi (Iran)	1–1	(United Arab Emirates) Al-Jazira
Hatami 78'	Live Report; Stats Report	Romarinho 44'

Sahand Stadium, Tabriz
Attendance: 41,520
Referee: Fu Ming (China)
13 March 2018
20:15 UTC+3

Al-Ahli (Saudi Arabia)	1–1	(Qatar) Al-Gharafa
Zakaria 58'	Live Report; Stats Report	Taremi 56'

King Abdullah Sports City, Jeddah
Attendance: 19,020
Referee: Ko Hyung-jin (South Korea)

3 April 2018
18:30 UTC+3

Al-Gharafa (Qatar)	2–3	(United Arab Emirates) Al-Jazira
Alaaeldin 28'; Amado 44'	Live Report; Stats Report	Romarinho 14'; Mabkhout 70', 90+4'

Thani bin Jassim Stadium, Al Rayyan
Attendance: 3,215
Referee: Adham Makhadmeh (Jordan)
3 April 2018
20:20 UTC+4

Al-Ahli (Saudi Arabia)	2–0	(Iran) Tractor Sazi
Assiri 49'; Zakaria 90+2'	Live Report; Stats Report

Tahnoun bin Mohammed Stadium, Al Ain (United Arab Emirates)
Attendance: 100
Referee: Peter Green (Australia)

17 April 2018
18:30 UTC+4

Al-Jazira (United Arab Emirates)	1–2	(Saudi Arabia) Al-Ahli
Romarinho 68'	Live Report; Stats Report	Al-Amri 6'; Zakaria 30'

Mohammed bin Zayed Stadium, Abu Dhabi
Attendance: 621
Referee: Minoru Tōjō (Japan)
17 April 2018
19:00 UTC+4:30

Tractor Sazi (Iran)	1–3	(Qatar) Al-Gharafa
Iranpourian 31' (pen.)	Live Report; Stats Report	Hassan 70'; Hatem 76'; Taremi 87'

Sahand Stadium, Tabriz
Attendance: 1,500
Referee: Ali Sabah (Iraq)

=== Group B ===
Pos	Team	Pld	W	D	L	GF	GA	GD	Pts	Qualification	DUH	ZOB	LOK	WAH
1	(Qatar) Al-Duhail	6	6	0	0	13	6	+7	18	Advance to knockout stage	—	3–1	3–2	1–0
2	(Iran) Zob Ahan	6	2	1	3	6	8	−2	7 (Note: Head-to-head results: Zob Ahan 2–0 Lokomotiv Tashkent, Lokomotiv Tashkent 1–1 Zob Ahan.)	Advance to knockout stage	0–1	—	2–0	2–0
3	(Uzbekistan) Lokomotiv Tashkent	6	2	1	3	13	9	+4	7		1–2	1–1	—	5–0
4	(United Arab Emirates) Al-Wahda	6	1	0	5	6	15	−9	3		2–3	3–0	1–4	—

Source: AFC
Rules for classification: Group stage tiebreakers
Notes:
12 February 2018
16:00 UTC+5

Lokomotiv Tashkent (Uzbekistan)	5–0	(United Arab Emirates) Al-Wahda
Nivaldo 25'; Alibaev 53', 87'; Sultan 55' (o.g.); Rashidov 59'	Live Report; Stats Report

Lokomotiv Stadium, Tashkent
Attendance: 5,440
Referee: Minoru Tōjō (Japan)
12 February 2018
16:15 UTC+3

Al-Duhail (Qatar)	3–1	(Iran) Zob Ahan
Boudiaf 74', 76'; Msakni 84'	Live Report; Stats Report	Kiros 12'

Abdullah bin Khalifa Stadium, Doha
Attendance: 2,150
Referee: Ryuji Sato (Japan)

19 February 2018
16:00 UTC+3:30

Zob Ahan (Iran)	2–0	(Uzbekistan) Lokomotiv Tashkent
Tabrizi 47'; Hosseini 90+2'	Live Report; Stats Report

Foolad Shahr Stadium, Isfahan
Attendance: 1,764
Referee: Fu Ming (China)
19 February 2018
18:50 UTC+4

Al-Wahda (United Arab Emirates)	2–3	(Qatar) Al-Duhail
Tagliabúe 4' (pen.); Batna 90+3' (pen.)	Live Report; Stats Report	El-Arabi 57', 80'; Boudiaf 75'

Zayed Sports City Stadium, Abu Dhabi
Attendance: 6,322
Referee: Mohd Amirul Izwan Yaacob (Malaysia)

6 March 2018
16:00 UTC+3:30

Zob Ahan (Iran)	2–0	(United Arab Emirates) Al-Wahda
Tabrizi 34', 73'	Live Report; Stats Report

Foolad Shahr Stadium, Isfahan
Attendance: 3,114
Referee: Adham Makhadmeh (Jordan)
6 March 2018
18:00 UTC+3

Al-Duhail (Qatar)	3–2	(Uzbekistan) Lokomotiv Tashkent
El-Arabi 9', 19'; Msakni 25'	Live Report; Stats Report	Nivaldo 57'; Bikmaev 59'

Abdullah bin Khalifa Stadium, Doha
Attendance: 4,023
Referee: Chris Beath (Australia)

12 March 2018
17:00 UTC+5

Lokomotiv Tashkent (Uzbekistan)	1–2	(Qatar) Al-Duhail
Rashidov 35'	Live Report; Stats Report	El-Arabi 90+1' (pen.), 90+4'

Lokomotiv Stadium, Tashkent
Attendance: 6,375
Referee: Hiroyuki Kimura (Japan)
12 March 2018
19:00 UTC+4

Al-Wahda (United Arab Emirates)	3–0	(Iran) Zob Ahan
Tagliabúe 45+1'; Batna 57'; Al-Akbari 65'	Live Report; Stats Report

Zayed Sports City Stadium, Abu Dhabi
Attendance: 1,839
Referee: Jarred Gillett (Australia)

3 April 2018
18:45 UTC+4:30

Zob Ahan (Iran)	0–1	(Qatar) Al-Duhail
	Live Report; Stats Report	Mohammad 84'

Foolad Shahr Stadium, Isfahan
Attendance: 4,760
Referee: Nivon Robesh Gamini (Sri Lanka)
3 April 2018
19:10 UTC+4

Al-Wahda (United Arab Emirates)	1–4	(Uzbekistan) Lokomotiv Tashkent
Kd. Ibrahim 88'	Live Report; Stats Report	Mirzaev 4', 39'; Shaakhmedov 55'; Rashed 89' (o.g.)

Zayed Sports City Stadium, Abu Dhabi
Attendance: 3,678
Referee: Liu Kwok Man (Hong Kong)

17 April 2018
17:00 UTC+3

Al-Duhail (Qatar)	1–0	(United Arab Emirates) Al-Wahda
Mostafa 47'	Live Report; Stats Report

Abdullah bin Khalifa Stadium, Doha
Attendance: 700
Referee: Ma Ning (China)
17 April 2018
19:00 UTC+5

Lokomotiv Tashkent (Uzbekistan)	1–1	(Iran) Zob Ahan
Tukhtakhodjaev 90'	Live Report; Stats Report	Tabrizi 25'

Lokomotiv Stadium, Tashkent
Attendance: 4,212
Referee: Ko Hyung-jin (South Korea)

=== Group C ===
Pos	Team	Pld	W	D	L	GF	GA	GD	Pts	Qualification	PER	SAD	NSF	WAS
1	(Iran) Persepolis	6	4	1	1	8	3	+5	13	Advance to knockout stage	—	1–0	3–0	2–0
2	(Qatar) Al-Sadd	6	4	0	2	11	5	+6	12	Advance to knockout stage	3–1	—	4–0	2–1
3	(Uzbekistan) Nasaf Qarshi	6	3	1	2	4	8	−4	10		0–0	1–0	—	1–0
4	(United Arab Emirates) Al-Wasl	6	0	0	6	3	10	−7	0		0–1	1–2	1–2	—

Source: AFC
Rules for classification: Group stage tiebreakers
13 February 2018
17:15 UTC+3:30

Persepolis (Iran)	3–0	(Uzbekistan) Nasaf Qarshi
Mensha 20'; Alipour 66', 71'	Live Report; Stats Report

Azadi Stadium, Tehran
Attendance: 25,830
Referee: Kim Dong-jin (South Korea)
13 February 2018
19:00 UTC+4

Al-Wasl (United Arab Emirates)	1–2	(Qatar) Al-Sadd
Fabio Lima 26'	Live Report; Stats Report	Bounedjah 79', 90'

Zabeel Stadium, Dubai
Attendance: 5,895
Referee: Ko Hyung-jin (South Korea)

20 February 2018
18:00 UTC+5

Nasaf Qarshi (Uzbekistan)	1–0	(United Arab Emirates) Al-Wasl
Golban 57'	Live Report; Stats Report

Qarshi Markaziy Stadium, Qarshi
Attendance: 12,348
Referee: Jarred Gillett (Australia)
20 February 2018
18:30 UTC+3

Al-Sadd (Qatar)	3–1	(Iran) Persepolis
Bounedjah 36', 51'; Khoukhi 66'	Live Report; Stats Report	Nemati 90+4'

Jassim bin Hamad Stadium, Al Rayyan
Attendance: 5,842
Referee: Muhammad Taqi (Singapore)

5 March 2018
18:30 UTC+5

Nasaf Qarshi (Uzbekistan)	1–0	(Qatar) Al-Sadd
Ganiev 62' (pen.)	Live Report; Stats Report

Qarshi Markaziy Stadium, Qarshi
Attendance: 20,978
Referee: Jumpei Iida (Japan)
5 March 2018
17:15 UTC+3:30

Persepolis (Iran)	2–0	(United Arab Emirates) Al-Wasl
Ahmadzadeh 36'; Alipour 41' (pen.)	Live Report; Stats Report

Azadi Stadium, Tehran
Attendance: 33,170
Referee: Ali Sabah (Iraq)

13 March 2018
18:15 UTC+3

Al-Sadd (Qatar)	4–0	(Uzbekistan) Nasaf Qarshi
Xavi 3'; Hassan 15'; Bounedjah 43'; Hamroun 71'	Live Report; Stats Report

Jassim bin Hamad Stadium, Al Rayyan
Attendance: 4,133
Referee: Ahmed Al-Kaf (Oman)
13 March 2018
19:15 UTC+4

Al-Wasl (United Arab Emirates)	0–1	(Iran) Persepolis
	Live Report; Stats Report	Kamyabinia 37'

Zabeel Stadium, Dubai
Attendance: 5,841
Referee: Ma Ning (China)

2 April 2018
19:30 UTC+5

Nasaf Qarshi (Uzbekistan)	0–0	(Iran) Persepolis
	Live Report; Stats Report

Qarshi Markaziy Stadium, Qarshi
Attendance: 18,349
Referee: Ali Abdulnabi (Bahrain)
2 April 2018
19:00 UTC+3

Al-Sadd (Qatar)	2–1	(United Arab Emirates) Al-Wasl
Bounedjah 9', 53'	Live Report; Stats Report	Caio 90+2'

Jassim bin Hamad Stadium, Al Rayyan
Attendance: 5,169
Referee: Ryuji Sato (Japan)

16 April 2018
19:30 UTC+4:30

Persepolis (Iran)	1–0	(Qatar) Al-Sadd
Pouraliganji 3' (o.g.)	Live Report; Stats Report

Azadi Stadium, Tehran
Attendance: 32,170
Referee: Hettikamkanamge Perera (Sri Lanka)
16 April 2018
19:00 UTC+4

Al-Wasl (United Arab Emirates)	1–2	(Uzbekistan) Nasaf Qarshi
Fabio Lima 33'	Live Report; Stats Report	Mukhitdinov 45+2'; Abdixolikov 48'

Zabeel Stadium, Dubai
Attendance: 250
Referee: Mohd Amirul Izwan Yaacob (Malaysia)

=== Group D ===
Pos	Team	Pld	W	D	L	GF	GA	GD	Pts	Qualification	EST	AIN	RAY	HIL
1	(Iran) Esteghlal	6	3	3	0	9	5	+4	12	Advance to knockout stage	—	1–1	2–0	1–0
2	(United Arab Emirates) Al-Ain	6	2	4	0	10	6	+4	10	Advance to knockout stage	2–2	—	1–1	2–1
3	(Qatar) Al-Rayyan	6	1	3	2	7	11	−4	6		2–2	1–4	—	2–1
4	(Saudi Arabia) Al-Hilal	6	0	2	4	3	7	−4	2		0–1	0–0	1–1	—

Source: AFC
Rules for classification: Group stage tiebreakers
13 February 2018
18:10 UTC+3

Al-Rayyan (Qatar)	2–2	(Iran) Esteghlal
Hamdallah 18'; Tabata 28'	Live Report; Stats Report	Thiam 6'; Ali Ghorbani 88'

Jassim bin Hamad Stadium, Al Rayyan
Attendance: 5,038
Referee: Hettikamkanamge Perera (Sri Lanka)
13 February 2018
20:25 UTC+3

Al-Hilal (Saudi Arabia)	0–0	(United Arab Emirates) Al-Ain
	Live Report; Stats Report

King Saud University Stadium, Riyadh
Attendance: 24,010
Referee: Ahmed Al-Kaf (Oman)

20 February 2018
19:10 UTC+4

Al-Ain (United Arab Emirates)	1–1	(Qatar) Al-Rayyan
Berg 10' (pen.)	Live Report; Stats Report	Hamdallah 28' (pen.)

Hazza bin Zayed Stadium, Al Ain
Attendance: 8,856
Referee: Mohanad Qassim (Iraq)
20 February 2018
19:30 UTC+4

Esteghlal (Iran)	1–0	(Saudi Arabia) Al-Hilal
Thiam 46'	Live Report; Stats Report

Al-Seeb Stadium, Seeb (Oman)
Attendance: 4,175
Referee: Ryuji Sato (Japan)

6 March 2018
19:20 UTC+4

Al-Ain (United Arab Emirates)	2–2	(Iran) Esteghlal
Berg 63'; Khalil 89' (pen.)	Live Report; Stats Report	Thiam 52', 77'

Hazza bin Zayed Stadium, Al Ain
Attendance: 10,036
Referee: Mohd Amirul Izwan Yaacob (Malaysia)
6 March 2018
20:15 UTC+3

Al-Hilal (Saudi Arabia)	1–1	(Qatar) Al-Rayyan
Al-Zori 58'	Live Report; Stats Report	Moutouali 3'

King Saud University Stadium, Riyadh
Attendance: 22,535
Referee: Ravshan Irmatov (Uzbekistan)

12 March 2018
18:15 UTC+3

Al-Rayyan (Qatar)	2–1	(Saudi Arabia) Al-Hilal
Hamdallah 44' (pen.); Tabata 66'	Live Report; Stats Report	Al-Qahtani 90' (pen.)

Jassim bin Hamad Stadium, Al Rayyan
Attendance: 9,138
Referee: Mohd Amirul Izwan Yaacob (Malaysia)
12 March 2018
19:00 UTC+3:30

Esteghlal (Iran)	1–1	(United Arab Emirates) Al-Ain
Thiam 42' (pen.)	Live Report; Stats Report	Shiotani 78'

Azadi Stadium, Tehran
Attendance: 90,000
Referee: Liu Kwok Man (Hong Kong)

2 April 2018
19:30 UTC+4

Al-Ain (United Arab Emirates)	2–1	(Saudi Arabia) Al-Hilal
Berg 40' (pen.), 45+2' (pen.)	Live Report; Stats Report	Al-Breik 7'

Hazza bin Zayed Stadium, Al Ain
Attendance: 15,126
Referee: Ma Ning (China)
2 April 2018
20:00 UTC+4:30

Esteghlal (Iran)	2–0	(Qatar) Al-Rayyan
Djeparov 4'; Ghafouri 58' (pen.)	Live Report; Stats Report

Azadi Stadium, Tehran
Attendance: 37,221
Referee: Kim Dong-jin (South Korea)

16 April 2018
18:45 UTC+3

Al-Hilal (Saudi Arabia)	0–1	(Iran) Esteghlal
	Live Report; Stats Report	Ghafouri 36'

Al Kuwait Sports Club Stadium, Kuwait City (Kuwait)
Attendance: 4,500
Referee: Hiroyuki Kimura (Japan)
16 April 2018
18:45 UTC+3

Al-Rayyan (Qatar)	1–4	(United Arab Emirates) Al-Ain
Soria 85'	Live Report; Stats Report	El Shahat 11'; O. Abdulrahman 55'; Berg 58', 78'

Jassim bin Hamad Stadium, Al Rayyan
Attendance: 6,178
Referee: Ravshan Irmatov (Uzbekistan)

=== Group E ===
Pos	Team	Pld	W	D	L	GF	GA	GD	Pts	Qualification	JEO	TJQ	KSW	KIT
1	(South Korea) Jeonbuk Hyundai Motors	6	5	0	1	22	9	+13	15	Advance to knockout stage	—	6–3	3–2	3–0
2	(China) Tianjin Quanjian	6	4	1	1	15	11	+4	13	Advance to knockout stage	4–2	—	3–2	3–0
3	(Japan) Kashiwa Reysol	6	1	1	4	6	10	−4	4		0–2	1–1	—	1–0
4	(Hong Kong) Kitchee	6	1	0	5	1	14	−13	3		0–6	0–1	1–0	—

Source: AFC
Rules for classification: Group stage tiebreakers
13 February 2018
19:30 UTC+9

Jeonbuk Hyundai Motors (South Korea)	3–2	(Japan) Kashiwa Reysol
Lee Dong-gook 55', 84'; Kim Jin-su 75'	Live Report; Stats Report	Lopes 10'; Esaka 27'

Jeonju World Cup Stadium, Jeonju
Attendance: 8,704
Referee: Alireza Faghani (Iran)
13 February 2018
20:00 UTC+8

Tianjin Quanjian (China)	3–0	(Hong Kong) Kitchee
Modeste 32'; Paulinho 36' (o.g.); Sun Ke 39'	Live Report; Stats Report

Tianjin Olympic Center Stadium, Tianjin
Attendance: 21,213
Referee: Abdulrahman Al-Jassim (Qatar)

20 February 2018
19:30 UTC+9

Kashiwa Reysol (Japan)	1–1	(China) Tianjin Quanjian
Cristiano 52'	Live Report; Stats Report	Pato 88'

Kashiwa Soccer Stadium, Kashiwa
Attendance: 6,776
Referee: Ahmed Al-Kaf (Oman)
20 February 2018
20:00 UTC+8

Kitchee (Hong Kong)	0–6	(South Korea) Jeonbuk Hyundai Motors
	Live Report; Stats Report	Adriano 6' (pen.), 14', 45+1' (pen.); Kim Jin-su 25'; Alves 32'; Lee Dong-gook 90+3'

Hong Kong Stadium, Hong Kong
Attendance: 13,519
Referee: Rowan Arumughan (India)

6 March 2018
19:00 UTC+9

Jeonbuk Hyundai Motors (South Korea)	6–3	(China) Tianjin Quanjian
Kim Shin-wook 24', 60', 64'; Han Kyo-won 42'; Lopes 56'; Choi Bo-kyung 72'	Live Report; Stats Report	Zhang Cheng 10'; Zhao Xuri 79'; Pato 89' (pen.)

Jeonju World Cup Stadium, Jeonju
Attendance: 8,691
Referee: Mohammed Abdulla (United Arab Emirates)
6 March 2018
19:30 UTC+9

Kashiwa Reysol (Japan)	1–0	(Hong Kong) Kitchee
Ito 66'	Live Report; Stats Report

Kashiwa Soccer Stadium, Kashiwa
Attendance: 5,541
Referee: Ilgiz Tantashev (Uzbekistan)

14 March 2018
20:00 UTC+8

Kitchee (Hong Kong)	1–0	(Japan) Kashiwa Reysol
Cheng Chin Lung 90+2'	Live Report; Stats Report

Hong Kong Stadium, Hong Kong
Attendance: 7,771
Referee: Adham Makhadmeh (Jordan)
14 March 2018
20:00 UTC+8

Tianjin Quanjian (China)	4–2	(South Korea) Jeonbuk Hyundai Motors
Wang Yongpo 8'; Zhang Cheng 55'; Modeste 84'; Pato 90+3'	Live Report; Stats Report	Kim Shin-wook 37'; Adriano 67'

Tianjin Olympic Center Stadium, Tianjin
Attendance: 15,314
Referee: Aziz Asimov (Uzbekistan)

4 April 2018
19:30 UTC+9

Kashiwa Reysol (Japan)	0–2	(South Korea) Jeonbuk Hyundai Motors
	Live Report; Stats Report	Lopes 16'; Lee Dong-gook 77'

Kashiwa Soccer Stadium, Kashiwa
Attendance: 7,187
Referee: Turki Al-Khudhayr (Saudi Arabia)
4 April 2018
20:00 UTC+8

Kitchee (Hong Kong)	0–1	(China) Tianjin Quanjian
	Live Report; Stats Report	Modeste 89'

Mong Kok Stadium, Hong Kong (Note: The Kitchee v Tianjin Quanjian match was played in Mong Kok Stadium, as the 2018 Hong Kong Sevens was held in Hong Kong Stadium in early April.)
Attendance: 6,299
Referee: Muhammad Taqi (Singapore)

18 April 2018
20:00 UTC+9

Jeonbuk Hyundai Motors (South Korea)	3–0	(Hong Kong) Kitchee
Lee Seung-gi 72'; Kim Shin-wook 79'; Lim Sun-young 87'	Live Report; Stats Report

Jeonju World Cup Stadium, Jeonju
Attendance: 4,487
Referee: Chris Beath (Australia)
18 April 2018
19:00 UTC+8

Tianjin Quanjian (China)	3–2	(Japan) Kashiwa Reysol
Zhao Xuri 24', 30'; Yang Xu 64'	Live Report; Stats Report	Koizumi 39'; Segawa 69'

Tianjin Olympic Center Stadium, Tianjin
Attendance: 17,418
Referee: Mohammed Abdulla (United Arab Emirates)

=== Group F ===
Pos	Team	Pld	W	D	L	GF	GA	GD	Pts	Qualification	SSI	ULS	MEL	KAW
1	(China) Shanghai SIPG	6	3	2	1	10	6	+4	11	Advance to knockout stage	—	2–2	4–1	1–1
2	(South Korea) Ulsan Hyundai	6	2	3	1	15	11	+4	9	Advance to knockout stage	0–1	—	6–2	2–1
3	(Australia) Melbourne Victory	6	2	2	2	11	16	−5	8		2–1	3–3	—	1–0
4	(Japan) Kawasaki Frontale	6	0	3	3	6	9	−3	3		0–1	2–2	2–2	—

Source: AFC
Rules for classification: Group stage tiebreakers
13 February 2018
19:30 UTC+11

Melbourne Victory (Australia)	3–3	(South Korea) Ulsan Hyundai
George 26', 37'; Williams 54'	Live Report; Stats Report	Oršić 24', 51'; Windbichler 34'

Melbourne Rectangular Stadium, Melbourne
Attendance: 5,127
Referee: Nawaf Shukralla (Bahrain)
13 February 2018
19:00 UTC+9

Kawasaki Frontale (Japan)	0–1	(China) Shanghai SIPG
	Live Report; Stats Report	Elkeson 23'

Todoroki Athletics Stadium, Kawasaki
Attendance: 12,193
Referee: Adham Makhadmeh (Jordan)

20 February 2018
19:00 UTC+9

Ulsan Hyundai (South Korea)	2–1	(Japan) Kawasaki Frontale
Jung Jae-yong 42'; Lee Yeong-jae 66'	Live Report; Stats Report	Chinen 85'

Ulsan Munsu Football Stadium, Ulsan
Attendance: 2,398
Referee: Fahad Al-Mirdasi (Saudi Arabia)
20 February 2018
20:00 UTC+8

Shanghai SIPG (China)	4–1	(Australia) Melbourne Victory
Hulk 27' (pen.); Wu Lei 41'; Oscar 47', 77'	Live Report; Stats Report	Berisha 69' (pen.)

Shanghai Stadium, Shanghai
Attendance: 16,697
Referee: Ali Sabah (Iraq)

7 March 2018
19:00 UTC+9

Kawasaki Frontale (Japan)	2–2	(Australia) Melbourne Victory
Elsinho 28'; Noborizato 55'	Live Report; Stats Report	Berisha 36'; George 90+3' (pen.)

Todoroki Athletics Stadium, Kawasaki
Attendance: 11,189
Referee: Abdulrahman Al-Jassim (Qatar)
7 March 2018
20:00 UTC+8

Shanghai SIPG (China)	2–2	(South Korea) Ulsan Hyundai
Oscar 38', 70'	Live Report; Stats Report	Windbichler 37'; Kim In-sung 68'

Shanghai Stadium, Shanghai
Attendance: 20,757
Referee: Hettikamkanamge Perera (Sri Lanka)

13 March 2018
19:30 UTC+11

Melbourne Victory (Australia)	1–0	(Japan) Kawasaki Frontale
Barbarouses 90'	Live Report; Stats Report

Melbourne Rectangular Stadium, Melbourne
Attendance: 6,639
Referee: Ammar Al-Jeneibi (United Arab Emirates)
13 March 2018
19:00 UTC+9

Ulsan Hyundai (South Korea)	0–1	(China) Shanghai SIPG
	Live Report; Stats Report	Elkeson 50'

Ulsan Munsu Football Stadium, Ulsan
Attendance: 4,040
Referee: Omar Al-Yaqoubi (Oman)

4 April 2018
19:00 UTC+9

Ulsan Hyundai (South Korea)	6–2	(Australia) Melbourne Victory
Júnior 12', 67'; Lim Jong-eun 20'; Oršić 38', 75'; Kim Seung-jun 55'	Live Report; Stats Report	Athiu 72'; Barbarouses 74'

Ulsan Munsu Football Stadium, Ulsan
Attendance: 834
Referee: Alireza Faghani (Iran)
4 April 2018
20:00 UTC+8

Shanghai SIPG (China)	1–1	(Japan) Kawasaki Frontale
Elkeson 68'	Live Report; Stats Report	Chinen 74'

Shanghai Stadium, Shanghai
Attendance: 21,657
Referee: Valentin Kovalenko (Uzbekistan)

18 April 2018
19:00 UTC+9

Kawasaki Frontale (Japan)	2–2	(South Korea) Ulsan Hyundai
Suzuki 2'; Hasegawa 43'	Live Report; Stats Report	Park Yong-woo 47'; Lee Yeong-jae 50'

Todoroki Athletics Stadium, Kawasaki
Attendance: 8,422
Referee: Khamis Al-Marri (Qatar)
18 April 2018
20:00 UTC+10

Melbourne Victory (Australia)	2–1	(China) Shanghai SIPG
Waring 40'; Ingham 68'	Live Report; Stats Report	Lin Chuangyi 45'

Melbourne Rectangular Stadium, Melbourne
Attendance: 7,148
Referee: Turki Al-Khudhayr (Saudi Arabia)

=== Group G ===
Pos	Team	Pld	W	D	L	GF	GA	GD	Pts	Qualification	GZE	BUR	CER	JEJ
1	(China) Guangzhou Evergrande	6	3	3	0	12	6	+6	12	Advance to knockout stage	—	1–1	3–1	5–3
2	(Thailand) Buriram United	6	2	3	1	7	6	+1	9	Advance to knockout stage	1–1	—	2–0	0–2
3	(Japan) Cerezo Osaka	6	2	2	2	6	8	−2	8		0–0	2–2	—	2–1
4	(South Korea) Jeju United	6	1	0	5	6	11	−5	3		0–2	0–1	0–1	—

Source: AFC
Rules for classification: Group stage tiebreakers
14 February 2018
17:00 UTC+8

Guangzhou Evergrande (China)	1–1	(Thailand) Buriram United
Goulart 16'	Live Report; Stats Report	Edgar 57'

Tianhe Stadium, Guangzhou
Attendance: 28,893
Referee: Ravshan Irmatov (Uzbekistan)
14 February 2018
19:45 UTC+9

Jeju United (South Korea)	0–1	(Japan) Cerezo Osaka
	Live Report; Stats Report	Mizunuma 90+3'

Jeju World Cup Stadium, Seogwipo
Attendance: 3,993
Referee: Ali Abdulnabi (Bahrain)

21 February 2018
19:00 UTC+9

Cerezo Osaka (Japan)	0–0	(China) Guangzhou Evergrande
	Live Report; Stats Report

Yanmar Stadium Nagai, Osaka
Attendance: 9,885
Referee: Ammar Al-Jeneibi (United Arab Emirates)
21 February 2018
18:00 UTC+7

Buriram United (Thailand)	0–2	(South Korea) Jeju United
	Live Report; Stats Report	Lee Chang-min 2'; Cruz 21' (pen.)

Chang Arena, Buriram
Attendance: 10,041
Referee: Khamis Al-Marri (Qatar)

6 March 2018
18:00 UTC+7

Buriram United (Thailand)	2–0	(Japan) Cerezo Osaka
Túñez 2'; Edgar 54'	Live Report; Stats Report

Chang Arena, Buriram
Attendance: 6,958
Referee: Fahad Al-Mirdasi (Saudi Arabia)
6 March 2018
20:00 UTC+8

Guangzhou Evergrande (China)	5–3	(South Korea) Jeju United
Alan 45+4'; Goulart 52', 57' (pen.), 86', 90+2'	Live Report; Stats Report	Jin Seong-uk 20'; Cruz 29'; Lee Chang-min 90+3'

Tianhe Stadium, Guangzhou
Attendance: 37,693
Referee: Peter Green (Australia)

14 March 2018
19:00 UTC+9

Cerezo Osaka (Japan)	2–2	(Thailand) Buriram United
Yang Dong-hyun 65'; Sugimoto 88'	Live Report; Stats Report	Yang Dong-hyun 11' (o.g.); Diogo 71'

Yanmar Stadium Nagai, Osaka
Attendance: 8,479
Referee: Mohanad Qassim (Iraq)
14 March 2018
19:00 UTC+9

Jeju United (South Korea)	0–2	(China) Guangzhou Evergrande
	Live Report; Stats Report	Gudelj 27'; Alan 37'

Jeju World Cup Stadium, Seogwipo
Attendance: 4,035
Referee: Muhammad Taqi (Singapore)

3 April 2018
19:00 UTC+9

Cerezo Osaka (Japan)	2–1	(South Korea) Jeju United
Katayama 16'; Kakitani 34'	Live Report; Stats Report	Jin Seong-uk 90+2'

Yanmar Stadium Nagai, Osaka
Attendance: 9,066
Referee: Ilgiz Tantashev (Uzbekistan)
3 April 2018
18:00 UTC+7

Buriram United (Thailand)	1–1	(China) Guangzhou Evergrande
Yoo Jun-soo 90+2'	Live Report; Stats Report	Zheng Long 20'

Chang Arena, Buriram
Attendance: 10,533
Referee: Mohammed Abdulla (United Arab Emirates)

17 April 2018
19:00 UTC+8

Guangzhou Evergrande (China)	3–1	(Japan) Cerezo Osaka
Huang Bowen 6'; Alan 57', 86'	Live Report; Stats Report	Fukumitsu 10'

Tianhe Stadium, Guangzhou
Attendance: 39,692
Referee: Nawaf Shukralla (Bahrain)
17 April 2018
20:00 UTC+9

Jeju United (South Korea)	0–1	(Thailand) Buriram United
	Live Report; Stats Report	Korrakot 54'

Jeju World Cup Stadium, Seogwipo
Attendance: 1,355
Referee: Alireza Faghani (Iran)

=== Group H ===
Pos	Team	Pld	W	D	L	GF	GA	GD	Pts	Qualification	SSB	KAS	SYD	SSH
1	(South Korea) Suwon Samsung Bluewings	6	3	1	2	8	7	+1	10	Advance to knockout stage	—	1–2	1–4	1–1
2	(Japan) Kashima Antlers	6	2	3	1	8	6	+2	9	Advance to knockout stage	0–1	—	1–1	1–1
3	(Australia) Sydney FC	6	1	3	2	7	8	−1	6		0–2	0–2	—	0–0
4	(China) Shanghai Shenhua	6	0	5	1	6	8	−2	5		0–2	2–2	2–2	—

Source: AFC
Rules for classification: Group stage tiebreakers
14 February 2018
19:30 UTC+11

Sydney FC (Australia)	0–2	(South Korea) Suwon Samsung Bluewings
	Live Report; Stats Report	Damjanović 62', 76' (pen.)

Sydney Football Stadium, Sydney
Attendance: 6,349
Referee: Mohammed Abdulla (United Arab Emirates)
14 February 2018
19:00 UTC+9

Kashima Antlers (Japan)	1–1	(China) Shanghai Shenhua
Endo 51'	Live Report; Stats Report	Moreno 3'

Kashima Soccer Stadium, Kashima
Attendance: 9,192
Referee: Muhammad Taqi (Singapore)

21 February 2018
19:00 UTC+9

Suwon Samsung Bluewings (South Korea)	1–2	(Japan) Kashima Antlers
Cristovam 89'	Live Report; Stats Report	Kanazaki 8', 59'

Suwon World Cup Stadium, Suwon
Attendance: 4,870
Referee: Abdulrahman Al-Jassim (Qatar)
21 February 2018
20:00 UTC+8

Shanghai Shenhua (China)	2–2	(Australia) Sydney FC
Martins 26'; Guarín 39'	Live Report; Stats Report	Wilkshire 28'; Brosque 34'

Hongkou Football Stadium, Shanghai
Attendance: 22,918
Referee: Valentin Kovalenko (Uzbekistan)

7 March 2018
19:30 UTC+11

Sydney FC (Australia)	0–2	(Japan) Kashima Antlers
	Live Report; Stats Report	Doi 40'; Ueda 87'

Sydney Football Stadium, Sydney
Attendance: 6,442
Referee: Ahmed Al-Kaf (Oman)
7 March 2018
19:00 UTC+9

Suwon Samsung Bluewings (South Korea)	1–1	(China) Shanghai Shenhua
Lee Ki-je 47'	Live Report; Stats Report	Moreno 71' (pen.)

Suwon World Cup Stadium, Suwon
Attendance: 3,904
Referee: Nivon Robesh Gamini (Sri Lanka)

13 March 2018
19:00 UTC+9

Kashima Antlers (Japan)	1–1	(Australia) Sydney FC
Kanazaki 27'	Live Report; Stats Report	Simon 70'

Kashima Soccer Stadium, Kashima
Attendance: 8,636
Referee: Khamis Al-Marri (Qatar)
13 March 2018
20:00 UTC+8

Shanghai Shenhua (China)	0–2	(South Korea) Suwon Samsung Bluewings
	Live Report; Stats Report	Damjanović 51'; Choi Sung-keun 88'

Hongkou Football Stadium, Shanghai
Attendance: 21,990
Referee: Ali Abdulnabi (Bahrain)

3 April 2018
20:00 UTC+9

Suwon Samsung Bluewings (South Korea)	1–4	(Australia) Sydney FC
Damjanović 24'	Live Report; Stats Report	Ninković 23'; Brosque 31'; Mierzejewski 79'; Bobô 90+1'

Suwon World Cup Stadium, Suwon
Attendance: 3,756
Referee: Fahad Al-Mirdasi (Saudi Arabia)
3 April 2018
20:00 UTC+8

Shanghai Shenhua (China)	2–2	(Japan) Kashima Antlers
Moreno 13' (pen.); Mao Jianqing 28'	Live Report; Stats Report	Suzuki 58'; Leandro 63'

Hongkou Football Stadium, Shanghai
Attendance: 20,028
Referee: Mohd Amirul Izwan Yaacob (Malaysia)

17 April 2018
20:00 UTC+10

Sydney FC (Australia)	0–0	(China) Shanghai Shenhua
	Live Report; Stats Report

Sydney Football Stadium, Sydney
Attendance: 9,855
Referee: Mohanad Qassim (Iraq)
17 April 2018
19:00 UTC+9

Kashima Antlers (Japan)	0–1	(South Korea) Suwon Samsung Bluewings
	Live Report; Stats Report	Damjanović 31'

Kashima Soccer Stadium, Kashima
Attendance: 6,229
Referee: Ammar Al-Jeneibi (United Arab Emirates)
