= 2018 AFC Champions League qualifying play-offs =

Football tournament qualification stage

The 2018 AFC Champions League qualifying play-offs were played from 16 to 30 January 2018. A total of 22 teams competed in the qualifying play-offs to decide eight of the 32 places in the group stage of the 2018 AFC Champions League.

== Teams ==
The following 22 teams, split into two regions (West Region and East Region), entered the qualifying play-offs, consisting of three rounds:

- 4 teams entered in the preliminary round 1.
- 6 teams entered in the preliminary round 2.
- 12 teams entered in the play-off round.

Region	Teams entering in play-off round	Teams entering in preliminary round 2	Teams entering in preliminary round 1
West Region	(United Arab Emirates) Al-Ain; (Iran) Zob Ahan; (Qatar) Al-Gharafa; (Uzbekistan) Nasaf Qarshi; (Uzbekistan) Pakhtakor; (Jordan) Al-Faisaly; (India) Aizawl; (Bahrain) Malkiya		
East Region	(South Korea) Suwon Samsung Bluewings; (Japan) Kashiwa Reysol (Note: The identity of the play-off teams from Japan and Philippines was not known at the time of the group stage draw.); (China) Shanghai SIPG; (China) Tianjin Quanjian	(Australia) Brisbane Roar; (Thailand) Chiangrai United; (Thailand) Muangthong United; (Hong Kong) Eastern; (Vietnam) FLC Thanh Hóa; (Malaysia) Johor Darul Ta'zim	(Indonesia) Bali United; (Myanmar) Shan United; (Philippines) Ceres–Negros; (Singapore) Tampines Rovers

== Format ==
In the qualifying play-offs, each tie was played as a single match. Extra time and penalty shoot-out were used to decide the winner if necessary (Regulations Article 9.2). The eight winners of the play-off round advanced to the group stage to join the 24 direct entrants. All losers in each round from associations with only play-off slots entered the AFC Cup group stage.

== Schedule ==
The schedule of each round was as follows.

Round	Match date
Preliminary round 1	16 January 2018
Preliminary round 2	23 January 2018
Play-off round	30 January 2018

== Bracket ==
The bracket of the qualifying play-offs for each region was determined by the AFC based on the association ranking of each team, with the team from the higher-ranked association hosting the match. Teams from the same association could not be placed into the same play-off.

=== Play-off West 1 ===
- (United Arab Emirates) Al-Ain advanced to Group D.

Preliminary round 1	Preliminary round 2	Play-off round
		(United Arab Emirates) Al-Ain	2
		(Bahrain) Malkiya	0

=== Play-off West 2 ===
- (Iran) Zob Ahan advanced to Group B.

Preliminary round 1	Preliminary round 2	Play-off round
		(Iran) Zob Ahan	3
		(India) Aizawl	1

=== Play-off West 3 ===
- (Qatar) Al-Gharafa advanced to Group A.

Preliminary round 1	Preliminary round 2	Play-off round
		(Qatar) Al-Gharafa	2
		(Uzbekistan) Pakhtakor	1

=== Play-off West 4 ===
- (Uzbekistan) Nasaf Qarshi advanced to Group C.

Preliminary round 1	Preliminary round 2	Play-off round
		(Uzbekistan) Nasaf Qarshi	5
		(Jordan) Al-Faisaly	1

=== Play-off East 1 ===
- (South Korea) Suwon Samsung Bluewings advanced to Group H.

Preliminary round 1	Preliminary round 2		Play-off round
			(South Korea) Suwon Samsung Bluewings	5
			(Vietnam) FLC Thanh Hóa	1
	(Hong Kong) Eastern	2
	(Vietnam) FLC Thanh Hóa	4

=== Play-off East 2 ===
- (Japan) Kashiwa Reysol advanced to Group E.

Preliminary round 1	Preliminary round 2		Play-off round
			(Japan) Kashiwa Reysol	3
			(Thailand) Muangthong United	0
	(Thailand) Muangthong United	5
	(Malaysia) Johor Darul Ta'zim	2

=== Play-off East 3 ===
- (China) Shanghai SIPG advanced to Group F.

Preliminary round 1		Preliminary round 2		Play-off round
				(China) Shanghai SIPG	1
				(Thailand) Chiangrai United	0
		(Thailand) Chiangrai United (a.e.t.)	2
(Indonesia) Bali United	3	(Indonesia) Bali United	1
(Singapore) Tampines Rovers	1

=== Play-off East 4 ===
- (China) Tianjin Quanjian advanced to Group E.

Preliminary round 1		Preliminary round 2		Play-off round
				(China) Tianjin Quanjian	2
				(Philippines) Ceres–Negros	0
		(Australia) Brisbane Roar	2
(Myanmar) Shan United	1 (3)	(Philippines) Ceres–Negros	3
(Philippines) Ceres–Negros (p)	1 (4)

== Preliminary round 1 ==
=== Summary ===
A total of four teams played in the preliminary round 1.

East Region
Team 1	Score	Team 2
Bali United (Indonesia)	3–1	(Singapore) Tampines Rovers
Shan United (Myanmar)	1–1 (a.e.t.) (3–4 p)	(Philippines) Ceres–Negros

=== East Region ===
16 January 2018
20:30 UTC+8 (Note: The kick-off of the Bali United v Tampines Rovers match was delayed from 19:30 to 20:30 local time due to bad weather.)

Bali United (Indonesia)	3–1	(Singapore) Tampines Rovers
Fadil 17'; Spasojević 62'; Hanis 90+2'	Live Report; Stats Report	Stephen 42'

Kapten I Wayan Dipta Stadium, Gianyar
Attendance: 19,237
Referee: Hiroyuki Kimura (Japan)

16 January 2018
16:00 UTC+6:30

Shan United (Myanmar)	1–1 (a.e.t.)	(Philippines) Ceres–Negros
Asare 99'	Live Report; Stats Report	Nyakwe 94' (o.g.)
Penalties
Asare (penalty scored); Chizoba (penalty missed); Nay Lin Tun (penalty scored); Win Min Htut (penalty scored); Nyakwe (penalty missed)	3–4	(penalty scored) de Murga; (penalty scored) Schröck; (penalty scored) Ott; (penalty scored) Marañón

Thuwunna Stadium, Yangon
Attendance: 257
Referee: Ahmed Al-Ali (Jordan)

== Preliminary round 2 ==
=== Summary ===
A total of eight teams played in the preliminary round 2: six teams which entered in this round, and two winners of the preliminary round 1.

East Region
Team 1	Score	Team 2
Eastern (Hong Kong)	2–4	(Vietnam) FLC Thanh Hóa
Muangthong United (Thailand)	5–2	(Malaysia) Johor Darul Ta'zim
Chiangrai United (Thailand)	2–1 (a.e.t.)	(Indonesia) Bali United
Brisbane Roar (Australia)	2–3	(Philippines) Ceres–Negros

=== East Region ===
23 January 2018
20:00 UTC+8

Eastern (Hong Kong)	2–4	(Vietnam) FLC Thanh Hóa
Lugo 25'; Bleda 64' (pen.)	Live Report; Stats Report	Omar 31' (pen.); Hoàng Đình Tùng 59', 60', 90+6'

Mong Kok Stadium, Hong Kong
Attendance: 3,305
Referee: Kim Hee-gon (South Korea)

23 January 2018
19:30 UTC+7

Muangthong United (Thailand)	5–2	(Malaysia) Johor Darul Ta'zim
Sarach 7'; Tristan 21'; Heberty 29' (pen.), 63'; Theerathon 56'	Live Report; Stats Report	Díaz 90+2', 90+5'

Supachalasai National Stadium, Bangkok
Attendance: 7,949
Referee: Aziz Asimov (Uzbekistan)

23 January 2018
19:00 UTC+7

Chiangrai United (Thailand)	2–1 (a.e.t.)	(Indonesia) Bali United
Akarawin 94'; Pathompol 105'	Live Report; Stats Report	Spasojević 116'

Singha Stadium, Chiang Rai
Attendance: 5,960
Referee: Rowan Arumughan (India)

23 January 2018
19:00 UTC+10

Brisbane Roar (Australia)	2–3	(Philippines) Ceres–Negros
Maccarone 35'; Bauthéac 86'	Live Report; Stats Report	Bienve 43', 65'; Nazari 75'

Queensland Sport and Athletics Centre, Brisbane
Attendance: 1,279
Referee: Yudai Yamamoto (Japan)

== Play-off round ==
=== Summary ===
A total of 16 teams played in the play-off round: twelve teams which entered in this round, and four winners of the preliminary round 2.

West Region
Team 1	Score	Team 2
Al-Ain (United Arab Emirates)	2–0	(Bahrain) Malkiya
Zob Ahan (Iran)	3–1	(India) Aizawl
Al-Gharafa (Qatar)	2–1	(Uzbekistan) Pakhtakor
Nasaf Qarshi (Uzbekistan)	5–1	(Jordan) Al-Faisaly

East Region
Team 1	Score	Team 2
Suwon Samsung Bluewings (South Korea)	5–1	(Vietnam) FLC Thanh Hóa
Kashiwa Reysol (Japan)	3–0	(Thailand) Muangthong United
Shanghai SIPG (China)	1–0	(Thailand) Chiangrai United
Tianjin Quanjian (China)	2–0	(Philippines) Ceres–Negros

=== West Region ===
30 January 2018
18:15 UTC+4

Al-Ain (United Arab Emirates)	2–0	(Bahrain) Malkiya
Berg 53'; Caio 61'	Live Report; Stats Report

Hazza bin Zayed Stadium, Al Ain
Attendance: 5,063
Referee: Mohd Amirul Izwan Yaacob (Malaysia)

30 January 2018
17:00 UTC+3:30

Zob Ahan (Iran)	3–1	(India) Aizawl
Rajabzadeh 3' (pen.); Tabrizi 83', 90+3'	Live Report; Stats Report	Ionescu 21'

Foolad Shahr Stadium, Isfahan
Attendance: 3,000
Referee: Nivon Robesh Gamini (Sri Lanka)

30 January 2018
20:00 UTC+3

Al-Gharafa (Qatar)	2–1	(Uzbekistan) Pakhtakor
Sneijder 21' (pen.); Amado 28'	Live Report; Stats Report	Khakimov 90+3'

Thani bin Jassim Stadium, Al Rayyan
Attendance: 2,936
Referee: Mohanad Qassim (Iraq)

30 January 2018
16:00 UTC+5

Nasaf Qarshi (Uzbekistan)	5–1	(Jordan) Al-Faisaly
Golban 12'; Abdixolikov 49'; Ganiev 52'; Ćeran 61' (pen.); Ya. Al-Rawashdeh 87' (o.g.)	Live Report; Stats Report	Meha 90+4'

Qarshi Markaziy Stadium, Qarshi
Attendance: 12,843
Referee: Hiroyuki Kimura (Japan)

=== East Region ===
30 January 2018
19:30 UTC+9

Suwon Samsung Bluewings (South Korea)	5–1	(Vietnam) FLC Thanh Hóa
Waguininho 44', 49'; Lim Sang-hyub 45+2'; Lee Ki-je 57'; Damjanović 86'	Live Report; Stats Report	Omar 90'

Suwon World Cup Stadium, Suwon
Attendance: 4,790
Referee: Khamis Al-Marri (Qatar)

30 January 2018
19:00 UTC+9

Kashiwa Reysol (Japan)	3–0	(Thailand) Muangthong United
Cristiano 51', 62'; Ito 89'	Live Report; Stats Report

Kashiwa Soccer Stadium, Kashiwa
Attendance: 6,598
Referee: Ammar Al-Jeneibi (United Arab Emirates)

30 January 2018
19:35 UTC+8

Shanghai SIPG (China)	1–0	(Thailand) Chiangrai United
Yu Hai 48'	Live Report; Stats Report

Shanghai Stadium, Shanghai
Attendance: 17,300
Referee: Ali Abdulnabi (Bahrain)

30 January 2018
15:30 UTC+8

Tianjin Quanjian (China)	2–0	(Philippines) Ceres–Negros
Modeste 18', 57'	Live Report; Stats Report

Tianjin Olympic Center Stadium, Tianjin
Attendance: 23,310
Referee: Masoud Tufayelieh (Syria)
