= 2018–19 in Australian soccer =

50th season of national competitive soccer in Australia

Soccer in Australia
- Season: 2018–19

Men's soccer
- A-League Premiership: Perth Glory
- A-League Championship: Sydney FC
- National Premier Leagues: Campbelltown City
- FFA Cup: Adelaide United

Women's soccer
- W-League Premiership: Melbourne Victory
- W-League Championship: Sydney FC

The 2018–19 season was the 50th season of national competitive soccer in Australia and 136th overall.

== National teams ==
=== Australia men's national soccer team ===
==== Friendlies ====
The following is a list of friendlies played by the men's senior national team in 2018–19.

15 October 2018	Kuwait	0–4	Australia	Kuwait City, Kuwait
19:30 AST (UTC+3)		Report	El Ebrahim 12' (o.g.); Giannou 21'; Rogic 82'; Mabil 88'	Stadium: Al Kuwait Sports Club Stadium; Referee: Yaqoob Said Abdullah Abdul Baki (Oman)

17 November 2018	Australia	1–1	South Korea	Brisbane, Australia
18:50 AEST (UTC+10)	Luongo 90+4'	Report	U.J. Hwang 22'	Stadium: Suncorp Stadium; Attendance: 32,922; Referee: Jumpei Iida (Japan)

20 November 2018	Australia	3–0	Lebanon	Sydney, Australia
19:30 AEDT (UTC+11)	Boyle 19', 41'; Leckie 68'	Report		Stadium: ANZ Stadium; Attendance: 33,268; Referee: Ryuji Sato (Japan)

30 December 2018	Australia	5–0	Oman	Dubai, United Arab Emirates
16:00 GST (UTC+4)	Nabbout 10'; Ikonomidis 14'; Mabil 24'; Degenek 58'; Irvine 89'	Report		Stadium: Maktoum bin Rashid Al Maktoum Stadium; Attendance: 0 (behind closed doors)

7 June 2019	South Korea	1–0	Australia	Busan, South Korea
20:00 KST (UTC+9)	U.J. Hwang 76'	Report		Stadium: Busan Asiad Main Stadium

==== AFC Asian Cup ====
6 January 2019 Group stage	Australia	0–1	Jordan	Al Ain, United Arab Emirates
15:00 GST (UTC+4)		Report	Bani Yaseen 26'	Stadium: Hazza bin Zayed Stadium; Attendance: 4,934; Referee: Ahmed Al-Kaf (Oman)

11 January 2019 Group stage	Palestine	0–3	Australia	Dubai, United Arab Emirates
15:00 GST (UTC+4)		Report	Maclaren 18'; Mabil 20'; Giannou 90'	Stadium: Rashid Stadium; Attendance: 11,915; Referee: Valentin Kovalenko (Uzbekistan)

15 January 2019 Group stage	Australia	3–2	Syria	Al Ain, United Arab Emirates
17:30 GST (UTC+4)	Mabil 41'; Ikonomidis 54'; Rogic 90+3'	Report	Kharbin 43'; Al Somah 80' (pen.)	Stadium: Khalifa bin Zayed Stadium; Attendance: 10,492; Referee: César Arturo Ramos (Mexico)

21 January 2019 Round of 16	Australia	0–0 (a.e.t.) (4–2 p)	Uzbekistan	Al Ain, United Arab Emirates
18:00 GST (UTC+4)		Report		Stadium: Khalifa bin Zayed Stadium; Attendance: 6,809; Referee: Abdulrahman Al-Jassim (Qatar)
	Penalties
	Milligan (penalty scored); Behich (penalty missed); Kruse (penalty scored); Giannou (penalty scored); Leckie (penalty scored)		(penalty scored) Shukurov; (penalty missed) Tukhtakhodjaev; (penalty scored) Alibaev; (penalty missed) Bikmaev

25 January 2019 Quarter-finals	United Arab Emirates	1–0	Australia	Al Ain, United Arab Emirates
20:00 GST (UTC+4)	Mabkhout 68'	Report		Stadium: Hazza bin Zayed Stadium; Attendance: 25,053; Referee: Ryuji Sato (Japan)

=== Australia men's national under-23 soccer team ===
==== Friendlies ====
The following is a list of friendlies played by the men's under 23 national team in 2018–19.

14 March 2019	Petaling Jaya City (Malaysia)	2–0	Australia	Kuala Lumpur, Malaysia
21:00 AWT		Report		Stadium: Shah Alam Stadium

17 March 2019	Malaysia	1–1	Australia	Kuala Lumpur, Malaysia
20:45 AWT	Azli 90+3'	Report	Wilson 50'	Stadium: Shah Alam Stadium

==== AFC U-23 Championship qualification ====
22 March 2019 Group H	Cambodia	0–6	Australia	Phnom Penh, Cambodia
18:30 ICT		Report	O'Neill 21'; Champness 29', 90+3'; McGree 31'; Wilson 42'; Waring 67'	Stadium: Phnom Penh Olympic Stadium; Attendance: 3,118; Referee: Ammar Mahfoodh (Bahrain)

24 March 2019 Group H	Chinese Taipei	0–6	Australia	Phnom Penh, Cambodia
15:30 ICT		Report	Majok 19', 24'; Deng 45+3'; Mourdoukoutas 51'; Waring 63', 88'	Stadium: Phnom Penh Olympic Stadium; Attendance: 424; Referee: Yaqoob Abdul Baki (Oman)

26 March 2019 Group H	South Korea	2–2	Australia	Phnom Penh, Cambodia
15:30 ICT	Y.W. Cho 26'; D.G. Lee 63'	Report	D'Agostino 16', 24'	Stadium: Phnom Penh Olympic Stadium; Attendance: 455; Referee: Yaqoob Abdul Baki (Oman)

=== Australia men's national under-20 soccer team ===
==== Friendlies ====
The following is a list of friendlies played by the men's under 20 national team in 2018–19.

16 August 2018 SBS Cup	Japan	1–0	Australia	Fujieda, Japan
18:30 (JST)	Miyashiro 26'			Stadium: Fujieda Soccer Stadium

17 August 2018 SBS Cup	Paraguay	3–0	Australia	Numazu, Japan
18:30 (JST)	Bogado 31', 60'; Romero 57'			Stadium: Ashitaka Park Stadium

19 August 2018 SBS Cup	Shizuoka Prefecture U-18	0–0 (3–4 p)	Australia	Shizuoka, Japan
15:00 (JST)				Stadium: Kusanagi Stadium

11 October 2018	Johor Darul Ta'zim III (Malaysia)	1–2	Australia	Pasir Gudang, Malaysia
	Yusof 81'	Report	Folami 13'; Cavallo 41'	Stadium: Pasir Gudang Stadium

15 October 2018	Singapore U-21	0–1	Australia	Singapore
		Source	Stamatelopoulos 40'	Stadium: Bishan Stadium

==== AFC U-19 Championship ====
19 October 2018 Group Stage	South Korea	1–1	Australia	Bekasi, Indonesia
19:00	Jeon Se-jin 52'	Report	Najjarine 89'	Stadium: Patriot Candrabhaga Stadium; Attendance: 151; Referee: Mohammed Al-Hoish (Saudi Arabia)

22 October 2018 Group Stage	Australia	2–1	Vietnam	Bekasi, Indonesia
16:00	Thurgate 37'; Folami 76'	Report	Nam 85'	Stadium: Patriot Candrabhaga Stadium; Attendance: 44; Referee: Omar Al-Yaqoubi (Oman)

25 October 2018 Group Stage	Australia	1–1	Jordan	Cibinong, Indonesia
19:00	Puflett 10'	Report	Al-Zebdieh 76'	Stadium: Pakansari Stadium; Attendance: 42; Referee: Sivakorn Pu-udom (Thailand)

29 October 2018 Quarter-finals	Saudi Arabia	3–1	Australia	Bekasi, Indonesia
19:30	Al-Ammar 7'; Al-Buraikan 50'; Abdulhamid 82'	Report	Atkinson 42'	Stadium: Patriot Candrabhaga Stadium; Attendance: 110; Referee: Sherzod Kasimov (Uzbekistan)

=== Australia men's national under-17 soccer team ===
==== Friendlies ====
The following is a list of friendlies played by the men's under 17 national team in 2018–19.

15 September 2018	Australia	5–1	Oman	Nilai, Malaysia
	Duzel 32'; Roddy 70'; Walsh 77'; Kirdar 79'; Zervas 81'	Report	Rabeea 32'	Stadium: USIM Stadium

4 March 2019 2019 UEFA ASSIST Tournament	Turkey	4–1	Australia	Manavgat, Turkey
11:30 (UTC+3)	Yesil; 60'; 90'; 90+1'	Report	Hammond 88' (pen.)	Stadium: Arslan Zeki Demirci Sports Complex; Referee: Emre Kargın (Turkey)

6 March 2019 2019 UEFA ASSIST Tournament	Australia	2–3	Tanzania	Antalya, Turkey
	Teague 13'; Botic 44'	Report (DFS); Report (AllAfrica)	John 16' (pen.), 84'; Mshirakandi 87'

8 March 2019 2019 UEFA ASSIST Tournament	Australia	2–2	Guinea	Antalya, Turkey
	Botic 60'; Courtney-Perkins 90'	Report	70'; 80'

==== AFC U-16 Championship ====
22 September 2018 Group Stage	South Korea	3–0	Australia	Petaling Jaya, Malaysia
20:45 (UTC+8)	Choi Min-seo 43', 68'; Hong Yun-sang 51'	Report		Stadium: Petaling Jaya Stadium; Attendance: 133; Referee: Shukri Al-Hunfush (Saudi Arabia)

25 September 2018 Group Stage	Australia	2–1	Iraq	Kuala Lumpur, Malaysia
16:00 (UTC+8)	Duzel 67'; Botic 74'	Report	Qasim 81' (pen.)	Stadium: UM Arena Stadium; Attendance: 187; Referee: Payam Heidari (Iran)

28 September 2018 Group Stage	Australia	4–0	Afghanistan	Petaling Jaya, Malaysia
16:00 (UTC+8)	Roddy 8', 45+3'; Botić 26', 61'	Report		Stadium: Petaling Jaya Stadium; Attendance: 115; Referee: Chen Hsin-chuan (Chinese Taipei)

1 October 2018 Quarter-finals	Indonesia	2–3	Australia	Kuala Lumpur, Malaysia
16:30 (UTC+8)	Sutan 17'; Rendy 89'	Report	Walsh 51'; Leombruno 65'; Botic 74'	Stadium: Bukit Jalil National Stadium; Attendance: 13,743; Referee: Kim Woo-sung (South Korea)

4 October 2018 Semi-finals	Japan	3–1	Australia	Kuala Lumpur, Malaysia
16:30 (UTC+8)	Toyama 59', 69'; Mito 78'	Report	Botic 8' (pen.)	Stadium: Bukit Jalil National Stadium; Attendance: 224; Referee: Omar Mohamed Al-Ali (United Arab Emirates)

=== Australia women's national soccer team ===
==== Friendlies ====
The following is a list of friendlies played by the women's senior national team in 2018–19.

5 October 2018	France	2–0	Australia	Saint-Étienne, France
21:00 CEST	Le Sommer 56', 90'	Report		Stadium: Stade Geoffroy-Guichard; Attendance: 10,815; Referee: Ivana Martinčić (Croatia)

9 October 2018	England	1–1	Australia	London, England
19:00 BST	Kirby 21'	Report	Polkinghorne 84'	Stadium: Craven Cottage; Referee: Florence Guillemin (France)

10 November 2018 Seven Consulting International Series	Australia	2–3	Chile	Sydney, Australia
15:30 AEDT	van Egmond 9' (pen.), 90+4' (pen.)	Report	Lara 20'; Guerrero 48'; Huenteo 90'	Stadium: Penrith Stadium; Attendance: 15,185; Referee: Rebecca Durcau

13 November 2018 Seven Consulting International Series	Australia	5–0	Chile	Newcastle, Australia
19:30 AEDT	Kerr 52'; Foord 54', 67', 88'; Gielnik 69'	Report		Stadium: McDonald Jones Stadium; Attendance: 12,649; Referee: Kim Yu-jeong (South Korea)

4 April 2019	United States	5–3	Australia	Commerce City, United States
19:00 (MDT)	Morgan 14'; Heath 53'; Rapinoe 61'; Pugh 67', 90+5'	Report	De Vanna 29'; Foord 47'; Kerr 81'	Stadium: Dick's Sporting Goods Park; Attendance: 17,264; Referee: Karen Abt (United States)

1 June 2019	Netherlands	3–0	Australia	Eindhoven, Netherlands
18:15 CEST	van de Sanden 45+1', 70'; Miedema 49'	Report		Stadium: Philips Stadion

3 June 2019	Netherlands	3–1	Australia	Netherlands
CEST		Report		Attendance: 0 (behind closed doors)

==== Tournament of Nations ====
26 July 2018	Brazil	1–3	Australia	Kansas City, United States
15:15 (CDT)	Debinha 79'	Report	Poliana 9' (o.g.); Butt 39'; Kerr 50'	Stadium: Children's Mercy Park; Attendance: 10,307; Referee: Christina Unkel (United States)

29 July 2018	United States	1–1	Australia	East Hartford, United States
19:00 (EDT)	Horan 90'	Report	Logarzo 22'	Stadium: Pratt & Whitney Stadium; Attendance: 21,570; Referee: Miriam León (El Salvador)

2 August 2018	Australia	2–0	Japan	Bridgeview, United States
16:45 (CDT)	Kennedy 47'; Kerr 81'	Report		Stadium: Toyota Park; Attendance: 11,922; Referee: Katja Koroleva (United States)

==== Cup of Nations ====
28 February 2019	Australia	2–0	New Zealand	Sydney, Australia
19:30 AEDT	Gielnik 44'; Raso 75'	Report; Summary		Stadium: Leichhardt Oval; Attendance: 6,805; Referee: Fusako Kajiyama (Japan)

3 March 2019	Australia	4–1	South Korea	Brisbane, Australia
18:00 AEST	Kerr 6' (pen.), 45+1'; De Vanna 36'; Gielnik 81'	Report; Summary	Ji So-yun 12'	Stadium: Suncorp Stadium; Attendance: 10,520

6 March 2019	Australia	3–0	Argentina	Melbourne, Australia
18:00 AEDT	Kerr 4'; Kennedy 33'; Foord 90+4' (pen.)	Report; Summary		Stadium: AAMI Park; Attendance: 6,834; Referee: Fusako Kajiyama (Japan)

==== FIFA Women's World Cup ====
9 June 2019 Group Stage	Australia	1–2	Italy	Valenciennes, France
13:00 CEST	Kerr 22'	Report	Bonansea 56', 90+5'	Stadium: Stade du Hainaut; Attendance: 15,380; Referee: Melissa Borjas (Honduras)

13 June 2019 Group Stage	Australia	3–2	Brazil	Montpellier, France
18:00 CEST	Foord 45+1'; Logarzo 58'; Mônica 66' (o.g.)	Report	Marta 27' (pen.); Cristiane 38'	Stadium: Stade de la Mosson; Attendance: 17,032; Referee: Esther Staubli (Switzerland)

18 June 2019 Group Stage	Jamaica	1–4	Australia	Grenoble, France
21:00 CEST	Solaun 49'	Report	Kerr 11', 42', 69', 83'	Stadium: Stade des Alpes; Attendance: 17,402; Referee: Katalin Kulcsár (Hungary)

22 June 2019 Round of 16	Norway	1–1 (a.e.t.) (4–1 p)	Australia	Nice, France
21:00 CEST	Herlovsen 31'	Report	Kellond-Knight 83'	Stadium: Allianz Riviera; Attendance: 12,229; Referee: Riem Hussein (Germany)
	Penalties
	C. Hansen (penalty scored); Reiten (penalty scored); Mjelde (penalty scored); Ingrid Engen (penalty scored)		(penalty missed) Kerr; (penalty missed) Gielnik; (penalty scored) Catley

=== Australia women's national under-20 soccer team ===
==== AFF Women's Championship ====
30 June 2018 Group stage	Malaysia	0–7	Australia	Palembang, Indonesia
16:00 WIB		Report	Chidiac 1', 49', 72'; Fowler 4', 59'; Condon 6'; Sayer 87'	Stadium: Bumi Sriwijaya Stadium; Attendance: 50; Referee: Cong Thi Dung (Vietnam)

4 July 2018 Group stage	Australia	9–0	Timor-Leste	Palembang, Indonesia
19:00 WIB	Vine 11', 18'; Tumeth 37'; Sayer 55', 65'; Cooney-Cross 59'; Phonsongkham 72'; Lowe 79'; Fowler 86'	Report		Stadium: Bumi Sriwijaya Stadium; Attendance: 100; Referee: Cong Thi Dung (Vietnam)

6 July 2018 Group stage	Australia	12–0	Cambodia	Palembang, Indonesia
16:00 WIB	Fowler 10', 12', 18', 27', 31'; Gordon 14'; McNamara 29'; Barbieri 42', 57', 87'; Ibini 69'; Chidiac 90'	Report		Stadium: Bumi Sriwijaya Stadium; Attendance: 100; Referee: Thein Thein Aye (Myanmar)

8 July 2018 Group stage	Thailand	4–2	Australia	Palembang, Indonesia
19:00 WIB	Silawan 50'; Kanjana 60', 62', 63'	Report	Chidiac 86' (pen.); Cooney-Cross 90+1'	Stadium: Bumi Sriwijaya Stadium; Attendance: 300; Referee: Bui Thi Thu Trang (Vietnam)

11 July 2018 Semi-final	Vietnam	2–4	Australia	Palembang, Indonesia
16:00 WIB	Tuyết Dung 17', 90'	Report	Chidiac 18', 76'; Nevin 35'; Cooney-Cross 65'	Stadium: Jakabaring Stadium; Attendance: 100; Referee: Abirami Apbai Naidu (Singapore)

13 July 2018 Final	Thailand	3–2	Australia	Palembang, Indonesia
19:00 WIB	Suchawadee 59'; Orathai 70'; Rattikan 73'	Report	Fowler 26', 58'	Stadium: Jakabaring Stadium

==== 2019 AFC Women's Championship qualification ====
24 October 2018 Round 1	Australia	18–0	Mongolia	Jounieh, Lebanon
11:30 EEST	Ibini-Isei 6', 11', 70', 77', 89'; Temuulen 19' (o.g.); Cooney-Cross 28', 32', 59'; Sayer 38'; Lowe 50'; Colvill 62', 64', 72', 75'; Ray 69', 86'; Phonsongkham 85'	Report		Stadium: Jounieh Municipal Stadium; Attendance: 40; Referee: Thein Thein Aye (Myanmar)

26 October 2018 Round 1	Lebanon	0–2	Australia	Jounieh, Lebanon
15:30 EEST		Report	Cooney-Cross 24'; Sayer 47'	Stadium: Jounieh Municipal Stadium; Attendance: 215; Referee: Anna Sidorova (Uzbekistan)

28 October 2018 Round 1	Australia	3–0	Hong Kong	Jounieh, Lebanon
11:30 EET	Sayer 14' (pen.), 40'; Colvill 62'	Report		Stadium: Jounieh Municipal Stadium; Attendance: 31; Referee: Cha Min-ji (South Korea)

26 April 2019 Round 2	Australia	11–1	Nepal	Mandalay, Myanmar
15:00 MST	Fowler 4', 7' (pen.), 15', 34', 54'; Rasamee 12'; Barbieri 36'; Lowe 67'; Cooney-Cross 78'; Riley 85'; Evans 87'	Report	Yonjan 45+2'	Stadium: Mandalarthiri Stadium; Attendance: 153; Referee: Mi Siyu (China)

28 April 2019 Round 2	Myanmar	1–3	Australia	Mandalay, Myanmar
18:00 MST	Myat Noe Khin 68'	Report	Ibini-Isei 45+1'; Fowler 47'; Blissett 84'	Stadium: Mandalarthiri Stadium; Attendance: 3,275; Referee: Saltanat Noroozi (Iran)

30 April 2019 Round 2	Australia	4–1	Uzbekistan	Mandalay, Myanmar
15:00 MST	Cooney-Cross 41'; Ibini-Isei 47'; Fowler 52'; Blissett 88'	Report	Kurbonova 78'	Stadium: Mandalarthiri Stadium; Referee: Chang Xinxin (China)

=== Australia women's national under-17 soccer team ===
==== Friendlies ====
The following is a list of friendlies played by the women's under 17 national team in 2018–19.

15 February 2019	Australia	4–0	Myanmar	Brisbane, Australia
18:00 (AEST)		Report		Stadium: Lions Stadium

17 February 2019	Australia	2–1	Myanmar	Gold Coast, Australia
18:30 (AEST)	Beaumont 7'; 90+2' (o.g.)	Report	53'	Stadium: Gold Coast Knights Stadium

==== AFC U-16 Women's Championship qualification ====
17 September 2018 Round 1	Palestine	0–11	Australia	Bishkek, Kyrgyzstan
13:00 (KGT)		Report	Beaumont 3', 65'; Stamatopoulos 12', 39', 45+1'; Jancevski 22'; Wallhead 57', 82'; Hunt 88', 90+3', 90+4'	Stadium: Dolen Omurzakov Stadium; Attendance: 100; Referee: Law Bik Chi (Hong Kong)

19 September 2018 Round 1	Australia	11–0	Indonesia	Bishkek, Kyrgyzstan
13:00 (KGT)	Stamatopoulos 5', 39' (pen.); Beaumont 11', 49', 67', 70'; Jancevski 33', 42'; Jasnos 54'; Morley 60', 76'	Report		Stadium: Dolen Omurzakov Stadium; Attendance: 75; Referee: Fusako Kajiyama (Japan)

21 September 2018 Round 1	Kyrgyzstan	0–10	Australia	Bishkek, Kyrgyzstan
17:00 (KGT)		Report	Morley 4', 38', 84'; Jancevski 32'; Zois 57', 63', 65'; Farmer 61'; Jasnos 73'; Mckenna 82'	Stadium: Dolen Omurzakov Stadium; Attendance: 600; Referee: Law Bik Chi (Hong Kong)

23 September 2018 Round 1	Australia	7–0	Chinese Taipei	Bishkek, Kyrgyzstan
13:00 (KGT)	Morley 8', 17', 44'; Beaumont 45+2'; Jancevski 65', 85'; Chen Yu-chi 78' (o.g.)	Report		Stadium: Dolen Omurzakov Stadium; Attendance: 70; Referee: Ri Hyang-ok (North Korea)

3 March 2019 Round 2	Australia	3–0	Iran	Vientiane, Laos
15:00 (ICT)	Beaumont 20'; Taranto 40'; Mckenna 90+3'	Report		Stadium: New Laos National Stadium; Attendance: 120; Referee: Abirami Naidu (Singapore)

5 March 2019 Round 2	Vietnam	0–1	Australia	Vientiane, Laos
15:00 (ICT)		Report	Jasnos 88'	Stadium: New Laos National Stadium; Attendance: 100; Referee: Pansa Chaisanit (Thailand)

7 March 2019 Round 2	Laos	0–3	Australia	Vientiane, Laos
18:30 (ICT)		Report	Beaumont 53'; Lowry 58'; McKenna 84' (pen.)	Stadium: New Laos National Stadium; Attendance: 1,025; Referee: Abirami Naidu (Singapore)

== AFC competitions ==
=== AFC Champions League ===
==== Group stage ====
===== Group F =====
Pos	Team	Pld	W	D	L	GF	GA	GD	Pts	Qualification	SAN	GZE	DAE	MVC
1	(Japan) Sanfrecce Hiroshima	6	5	0	1	9	4	+5	15	Advance to knockout stage	—	1–0	2–0	2–1
2	(China) Guangzhou Evergrande	6	3	1	2	9	5	+4	10	Advance to knockout stage	2–0	—	1–0	4–0
3	(South Korea) Daegu FC	6	3	0	3	10	6	+4	9		0–1	3–1	—	4–0
4	(Australia) Melbourne Victory	6	0	1	5	4	17	−13	1		1–3	1–1	1–3	—

Source: AFC

===== Group H =====
Pos	Team	Pld	W	D	L	GF	GA	GD	Pts	Qualification	ULS	SSI	KAW	SYD
1	(South Korea) Ulsan Hyundai	6	3	2	1	5	7	−2	11	Advance to knockout stage	—	1–0	1–0	1–0
2	(China) Shanghai SIPG	6	2	3	1	13	8	+5	9	Advance to knockout stage	5–0	—	1–0	2–2
3	(Japan) Kawasaki Frontale	6	2	2	2	9	6	+3	8		2–2	2–2	—	1–0
4	(Australia) Sydney FC	6	0	3	3	5	11	−6	3		0–0	3–3	0–4	—

Source: AFC

== Men's football ==
=== A-League ===
Pos	Team	Pld	W	D	L	GF	GA	GD	Pts	Qualification
1	Perth Glory	27	18	6	3	56	23	+33	60	Qualification for 2020 AFC Champions League group stage and Finals series (Note: The top two teams enter the Finals series at the semi-finals, while the teams ranked third to sixth enter the Finals series at the elimination-finals.)
2	Sydney FC (C)	27	16	4	7	43	29	+14	52	Qualification for 2020 AFC Champions League group stage and Finals series
3	Melbourne Victory	27	15	5	7	50	32	+18	50	Qualification for 2020 AFC Champions League preliminary round 2 and Finals series
4	Adelaide United	27	12	8	7	37	32	+5	44	Qualification for Finals series
5	Melbourne City	27	11	7	9	39	32	+7	40	Qualification for Finals series
6	Wellington Phoenix (Note: Wellington Phoenix cannot qualify for the AFC Champions League as they are not recognised as an AFC club.)	27	11	7	9	46	43	+3	40	Qualification for Finals series
7	Newcastle Jets	27	10	5	12	40	36	+4	35	
8	Western Sydney Wanderers	27	6	6	15	42	54	−12	24	
9	Brisbane Roar	27	4	6	17	38	71	−33	18	
10	Central Coast Mariners	27	3	4	20	31	70	−39	13	

Source: A-Leagues
Rules for classification: 1) points; 2) goal difference; 3) number of goals scored.
(C) Champions

==== Finals series ====
Elimination-finals
Adelaide United (a.e.t.)	1
Melbourne City	0
Melbourne Victory	3
Wellington Phoenix	1

Semi-finals
Perth Glory (pen.)	3 (5)
Adelaide United	3 (4)
Sydney FC	6
Melbourne Victory	1

Grand Final
Perth Glory	0 (1)
Sydney FC (pen.)	0 (4)

===== Elimination-finals =====
3 May 2019	Melbourne Victory	3–1	Wellington Phoenix	Melbourne
19:50 AEST	Niedermeier 42'; Barbarouses 53'; Toivonen 71'	Report	Krishna 64'	Stadium: AAMI Park; Attendance: 16,010; Referee: Shaun Evans

5 May 2019	Adelaide United	1–0	Melbourne City	Adelaide
18:30 ACST	Halloran 119'	Report		Stadium: Coopers Stadium; Attendance: 13,232; Referee: Kurt Ams

===== Semi-finals =====
12 May 2019	Perth Glory	3–3 (5–4 p)	Adelaide United	Perth
18:30 AWST	Castro 29', 74'; Neville 104'	Report	Diawara 81'; Kitto 90+4'; Marrone 115'	Stadium: HBF Park; Attendance: 17,868; Referee: Alex King
	Penalties
	Juande (penalty scored); Catro (penalty missed); Santalab (penalty scored); Reddy (penalty scored); Brimmer (penalty scored); Davidson (penalty missed); Lowry (penalty missed); Chianese (penalty scored)		(penalty scored) Goodwin; (penalty scored) Elsey; (penalty scored) Lia; (penalty missed) Isaías; (penalty scored) Halloran; (penalty missed) Diawara; (penalty missed) Mileusnic; (penalty missed) Konstandopoulos

10 May 2019	Sydney FC	6–1	Melbourne Victory	Sydney
18:30 AWST	Calver 3'; Brosque 43'; Broxham 45+2' (o.g.); Le Fondre 63', 68'; Ninković 88'	Report		Stadium: Jubilee Stadium; Attendance: 12,141; Referee: Chris Beath

===== Grand final =====
19 May 2019
16:45 AWST

Perth Glory	0–0	Sydney FC
	Report
Penalties
Juande (penalty scored); Keogh (penalty missed); Santalab (penalty missed)	1–4	(penalty scored) Le Fondre; (penalty scored) O'Neill; (penalty scored) Grant; (penalty scored) Ghoochannejhad

Optus Stadium, Perth
Attendance: 56,371
Referee: Shaun Evans

=== National Premier Leagues ===
The Final Series featured the winner of each Member Federation's league competition in the National Premier Leagues, with the overall winner qualifying directly for the 2019 FFA Cup Round of 32.

Quarter-finals
(New South Wales) Wollongong Wolves	5
(Australian Capital Territory) Canberra Olympic	1
(Victoria (state)) Heidelberg United	2
(Western Australia) Perth SC (a.e.t.)	3
(New South Wales) Maitland FC	3
(Tasmania) Devonport City	2
(Queensland) Lions FC	2
(South Australia) Campbelltown City	1

Semi-finals
(New South Wales) Wollongong Wolves	2
(Western Australia) Perth SC	0
(New South Wales) Maitland FC	0
(Queensland) Lions FC	2

Grand Final
(New South Wales) Wollongong Wolves (a.e.t.)	4
(Queensland) Lions FC	3

=== State club winners ===
These are the winners for each top-tier state competition in 2019.

Federation	Champions	Premiers	National Cup
Capital Football	Gungahlin United	Canberra Olympic	Tigers FC
Football South Coast	Corrimal Rangers	Wollongong Olympic	Bulli
Northern NSW Football	Edgeworth	Maitland	N/A
Football NSW	Sydney United 58	Wollongong Wolves	Marconi Stallions
Football Northern Territory	North: Casuarina	North: Casuarina	Darwin Olympic
Football Northern Territory	South: Vikings	South: Verdi	
Football Queensland	Gold Coast Knights	Lions FC	N/A
Football South Australia	Campbelltown City	Campbelltown City	N/A
Football Tasmania	Devonport City		South Hobart
Football Victoria	Bentleigh Greens	Heidelberg United	Hume City
Football West	Perth SC	Perth SC	N/A

=== Cup competitions ===
==== FFA Cup ====
Round of 32; 25 July–7 August
Canberra FC	1
Broadmeadow Magic	4
Bentleigh Greens	1
Wellington Phoenix	0
Gwelup Croatia	0
Adelaide Comets	4
Heidelberg United	2
Charlestown City Blues	1
Port Melbourne	0
APIA Leichhardt Tigers	1
Perth Glory	0
Melbourne Victory	1
Queensland Lions	3
Olympic FC	2
Adelaide United	3
Central Coast Mariners	0
Brisbane Roar	0
Melbourne City (a.e.t.)	1
Gold Coast Knights	0
Newcastle Jets	1
Bonnyrigg White Eagles	2
Hakoah Sydney City East	1
Hellenic Athletic	3
Western Sydney Wanderers	4
Avondale FC	4
Marconi Stallions	1
Northcote City	1
Devonport City	3
Cairns FC	4
Armadale SC	0
Rockdale City Suns	2
Sydney FC	4

Round of 16; 21–29 August
Broadmeadow Magic	0
Bentleigh Greens	4
Adelaide Comets	0
Heidelberg United	4
APIA Leichhardt Tigers	3
Melbourne Victory	2
Queensland Lions	0
Adelaide United	1
Melbourne City	1
Newcastle Jets	0
Bonnyrigg White Eagles	1
Western Sydney Wanderers	2
Avondale FC	4
Devonport City	1
Cairns FC	1
Sydney FC	2

Quarter-finals; 18–26 September
Bentleigh Greens	1
Heidelberg United	0
APIA Leichhardt Tigers	0
Adelaide United	2
Melbourne City	1
Western Sydney Wanderers	2
Avondale FC	2
Sydney FC (a.e.t.)	4

Semi-finals; 5–6 October
Bentleigh Greens	0
Adelaide United	2
Western Sydney Wanderers	0
Sydney FC	3

Final; 30 October
Adelaide United	2
Sydney FC	1

===== Final =====
30 October 2018
19:00 ACDT

Adelaide United	2–1	Sydney FC
Goodwin 25', 74'	Report	Le Fondre 28' (pen.)

Hindmarsh Stadium, Adelaide
Attendance: 14,448
Referee: Jarred Gillett

== Women's football ==
=== W-League ===
Pos	Team	Pld	W	D	L	GF	GA	GD	Pts	Qualification
1	Melbourne Victory	12	7	3	2	21	15	+6	24	Qualification to Finals series and 2019 AFC Women's Club Championship
2	Brisbane Roar	12	6	2	4	18	17	+1	20	Qualification to Finals series
3	Sydney FC (C)	12	6	1	5	28	19	+9	19	Qualification to Finals series
4	Perth Glory	12	5	4	3	28	20	+8	19	Qualification to Finals series
5	Melbourne City	12	6	1	5	20	15	+5	19	
6	Adelaide United	12	5	3	4	17	19	−2	18	
7	Newcastle Jets	12	5	1	6	18	21	−3	16	
8	Canberra United	12	3	4	5	13	18	−5	13	
9	Western Sydney Wanderers	12	1	1	10	11	30	−19	4	

Source: A-Leagues
Rules for classification: 1) points; 2) goal difference; 3) number of goals scored.
(C) Champions

==== Finals series ====
Semi-finals
1	Melbourne Victory	2
4	Perth Glory (a.e.t.)	4
2	Brisbane Roar	1
3	Sydney FC	2

Grand Final
Sydney FC	4
Perth Glory	2

== Deaths ==
- Darren Stewart, 52, former Australia, Newcastle Rosebud, APIA Leichhardt, and Newcastle Breakers defender.
- David Cervinski, 48, former Melbourne Knights, North Geelong Warriors, Carlton SC, and Wollongong Wolves defender.

== Retirements ==
- 28 July 2018: Ljubo Milicevic, 37, former Australia, Melbourne Knights, Perth Glory, Melbourne Victory, and Newcastle Jets defender.
- 11 August 2018: Michael Beauchamp, 37, former Australia, Marconi Stallions, Parramatta Power, Central Coast Mariners, Melbourne Heart, Sydney FC, and Western Sydney Wanderers defender.
- 12 August 2018: Dylan Macallister, 36, former Sydney Olympic, Northern Spirit, Central Coast Mariners, Wellington Phoenix, Gold Coast United, and Melbourne Heart striker.
- 28 August 2018: Luke Wilkshire, 36, former Australia and Sydney FC defender.
- 17 September 2018: Gülcan Koca, 28, former Turkey and Melbourne Victory defender.
- 20 September 2018: Anna Green, 28, former New Zealand, Adelaide United, and Sydney FC defender.
- 13 November 2018: Ante Covic, 43, former Australia, Marconi Stallions, Newcastle Jets, Melbourne Victory, Western Sydney Wanderers, and Perth Glory goalkeeper.
- 7 January 2019: Adrian Leijer, 32, former Australia, Melbourne Knights, and Melbourne Victory defender.
- 30 January 2019: Kalifa Cissé, 35, former Mali and Central Coast Mariners defender.
- 29 March 2019: Tim Cahill, 39, former Australia and Melbourne City striker.
- 4 April 2019: Brendon Santalab, 36, former Parramatta Power, Sydney United, Sydney FC, North Queensland Fury, Western Sydney Wanderers, and Perth Glory striker.
- 12 April 2019: Carl Valeri, 34, former Australia and Melbourne Victory midfielder.
- 15 April 2019: Alex Brosque, 35, former Australia, Marconi Stallions, Brisbane Roar, and Sydney FC forward and midfielder.
- 17 April 2019: Matt McKay, 36, former Australia, Brisbane Strikers, Eastern Suburbs, and Brisbane Roar midfielder.
- 22 April 2019: Bruce Djite, 32, former Australia, Adelaide United, and Gold Coast United striker.
- 2 May 2019: Marcelo Carrusca, 35, former Adelaide United, Melbourne City, and West Adelaide midfielder.
- 9 May 2019: Eugene Galekovic, 37, former Melbourne Knights, Eastern Pride, South Melbourne, Melbourne Victory, Adelaide United, and Melbourne City goalkeeper.
- 17 May 2019: Manny Muscat, 34, former Sunshine George Cross, Green Gully, Wellington Phoenix, and Melbourne City defender.
- 11 June 2019: Aaron Hughes, 39, former Northern Ireland and Melbourne City defender.
- 24 June 2019: Jop van der Linden, 28, former Sydney FC defender.
