= 2019 in Chinese football =

Football in China
- Season: 2019

Men's football
- CFA Super Cup: Shanghai SIPG

The 2019 season was the 69th season of competitive association football in China.

== Promotion and relegation ==
League	Promoted to league	Relegated from league
Chinese Super League	Wuhan Zall; Shenzhen F.C.	Changchun Yatai; Guizhou Hengfeng
China League One	Sichuan Longfor; Nantong Zhiyun	Dalian Transcendence; Zhejiang Yiteng
China League Two	Chengdu Better City; Taizhou Yuanda; Hubei Chufeng United; Nanjing Shaye; Lhasa Urban Construction Investment; Shanxi Metropolis; Yunnan Kunlu; Wuhan Three Towns; Guangxi Baoyun; Shenzhen Xinqiao	

1. ^{†} Teams failed to gain license for 2019 Chinese Super League now, but may regain in the future.

== National teams ==
=== China national football team ===
7 January 2019 2019 AFC Asian Cup	China	2–1	Kyrgyzstan	Al Ain, United Arab Emirates
15:00 UTC+4	Matyash 50' (o.g.); Yu Dabao 78'	Report	Israilov 42'	Stadium: Sheikh Khalifa International Stadium; Attendance: 1,839; Referee: Mohammed Abdulla Hassan Mohamed (United Arab Emirates)

11 January 2019 2019 AFC Asian Cup	Philippines	0–3	China	Abu Dhabi, United Arab Emirates
17:30 UTC+4		Report	Wu Lei 40', 66'; Yu Dabao 80'	Stadium: Mohammed bin Zayed Stadium; Referee: Hiroyuki Kimura (Japan)

16 January 2019 2019 AFC Asian Cup	South Korea	2–0	China	Abu Dhabi, United Arab Emirates
17:30 UTC+4	Hwang Ui-jo 14' (pen.); Kim Min-jae 51'	Report		Stadium: Al Nahyan Stadium; Referee: Abdulrahman Al-Jassim (Qatar)

20 January 2019 2019 AFC Asian Cup	Thailand	1–2	China	Al Ain, United Arab Emirates
18:00 UTC+4	Supachai 31'	Report	Xiao Zhi 67'; Gao Lin 71' (pen.)	Stadium: Hazza bin Zayed Stadium; Attendance: 8,026; Referee: Mohammed Abdulla Hassan Mohamed (United Arab Emirates)

24 January 2019 2019 AFC Asian Cup	China	–	Iran	Abu Dhabi, United Arab Emirates
20:00 UTC+4				Stadium: Mohammed bin Zayed Stadium; Referee: Abdulrahman Al-Jassim (Qatar)

=== China women's national football team ===
17 January 2019 2019 Four Nations Tournament	China	3–0	Nigeria	Wuhua County Olympic Sports Centre, Meizhou
19:35		[]		Referee: Gu Chunhan (China)

20 January 2019 2019 Four Nations Tournament	China	1–0	South Korea	Wuhua County Olympic Sports Centre, Meizhou
19:35		[]		Referee: Qin Liang (China)

1 March 2019 2019 Algarve Cup	China	1–3	Norway	Albufeira Municipal Stadium, Albufeira
13:15		[]		Referee: Lidya Tafasse (Ethiopia)

4 Mar 2019 2019 Algarve Cup	Denmark	1–0	China	VRS António Sports Complex, Vila Real de Santo António
13:15		[]

7 Mar 2019 2019 Algarve Cup	China	1–1	Netherlands	Albufeira Municipal Stadium, Albufeira
17:15		[]

31 May 2019 International Friendly	France	2–1	China	Stade Dominique–Duvauchelle, Créteil
21:00		[]

8 June 2019 2019 FIFA Women's World Cup	Germany	1–0	China	Roazhon Park, Rennes
15:00 UTC+2	Gwinn 66'	[]		Attendance: 15,283; Referee: Marie–Soleil Beaudoin (Canada)

13 June 2019 2019 FIFA Women's World Cup	South Africa	0–1	China	Parc des Princes, Paris
21:00 UTC+2		[]	Li Ying 40'	Attendance: 20,011; Referee: Katalin Kulcsár (Hungary)

17 June 2019 2019 FIFA Women's World Cup	China	0–0	Spain	Stade Océane, Le Havre
18:00 UTC+2		[]		Attendance: 11,814; Referee: Edina Alves Batista (Brazil)

25 June 2019 2019 FIFA Women's World Cup	Italy	2–0	China	Stade de la Mosson, Montpellier
18:00 UTC+2	Giacinti 15'; Galli 49'	[]		Attendance: 17,492; Referee: Edina Alves Batista (Brazil)

7 November 2019 2019 Yongchuan International Tournament	New Zealand	0–2	China	Yongchuan Sports Center, Chongqing
19:35				Referee: Law Bik Chi (Hong Kong)

10 November 2019 2019 Yongchuan International Tournament	Brazil	0–0	China	Yongchuan Sports Center, Chongqing
19:35				Referee: Kim Yu–Jeong (South Korea)

10 December 2019 2019 EAFF E-1 Football Championship Final round	South Korea	0–0	China	Busan Gudeok Stadium, Busan
16:15 UTC+9				Attendance: 1500; Referee: Kate Jacewicz (Australia)

14 December 2019 2019 EAFF E-1 Football Championship Final round	China	0–3	Japan	Busan Gudeok Stadium, Busan
15:55 UTC+9			Iwabuchi 9', 44', 56'	Attendance: 570; Referee: Rebecca Durcau (Australia)

17 December 2019 2019 EAFF E-1 Football Championship Final round	Chinese Taipei	0–1	China	Busan Gudeok Stadium, Busan
16:15 UTC+9			Wu Haiyan 30'	Attendance: 587; Referee: Pansa Chaisanit (Thailand)

== AFC competitions ==
=== Qualifying play-offs ===
==== Play-off round ====
Team 1	Score	Team 2
Shandong Luneng (China)	4–1 (East 2)	(Vietnam) Hà Nội

=== Group stage ===
==== Group E ====
Pos	Team	Pld	W	D	L	GF	GA	GD	Pts	Qualification	SDL	KAS	GYE	JDT
1	(China) Shandong Luneng	6	3	2	1	10	8	+2	11	Advance to knockout stage	—	2–2	2–1	2–1
2	(Japan) Kashima Antlers	6	3	1	2	9	8	+1	10	Advance to knockout stage	2–1	—	0–1	2–1
3	(South Korea) Gyeongnam FC	6	2	2	2	9	8	+1	8		2–2	2–3	—	2–0
4	(Malaysia) Johor Darul Ta'zim	6	1	1	4	4	8	−4	4		0–1	1–0	1–1	—

Source: AFC
Rules for classification: Group stage tiebreakers

==== Group F ====
Pos	Team	Pld	W	D	L	GF	GA	GD	Pts	Qualification	SAN	GZE	DAE	MVC
1	(Japan) Sanfrecce Hiroshima	6	5	0	1	9	4	+5	15	Advance to knockout stage	—	1–0	2–0	2–1
2	(China) Guangzhou Evergrande	6	3	1	2	9	5	+4	10	Advance to knockout stage	2–0	—	1–0	4–0
3	(South Korea) Daegu FC	6	3	0	3	10	6	+4	9		0–1	3–1	—	4–0
4	(Australia) Melbourne Victory	6	0	1	5	4	17	−13	1		1–3	1–1	1–3	—

Source: AFC
Rules for classification: Group stage tiebreakers

==== Group G ====
Pos	Team	Pld	W	D	L	GF	GA	GD	Pts	Qualification	JEO	URA	BJG	BUR
1	(South Korea) Jeonbuk Hyundai Motors	6	4	1	1	7	3	+4	13	Advance to knockout stage	—	2–1	3–1	0–0
2	(Japan) Urawa Red Diamonds	6	3	1	2	9	4	+5	10	Advance to knockout stage	0–1	—	3–0	3–0
3	(China) Beijing FC	6	2	1	3	6	8	−2	7		0–1	0–0	—	2–0
4	(Thailand) Buriram United	6	1	1	4	3	10	−7	4		1–0	1–2	1–3	—

Source: AFC
Rules for classification: Group stage tiebreakers

==== Group H ====
Pos	Team	Pld	W	D	L	GF	GA	GD	Pts	Qualification	ULS	SSI	KAW	SYD
1	(South Korea) Ulsan Hyundai	6	3	2	1	5	7	−2	11	Advance to knockout stage	—	1–0	1–0	1–0
2	(China) Shanghai SIPG	6	2	3	1	13	8	+5	9	Advance to knockout stage	5–0	—	1–0	2–2
3	(Japan) Kawasaki Frontale	6	2	2	2	9	6	+3	8		2–2	2–2	—	1–0
4	(Australia) Sydney FC	6	0	3	3	5	11	−6	3		0–0	3–3	0–4	—

Source: AFC
Rules for classification: Group stage tiebreakers

== Men's football ==
=== League season ===
==== Chinese Super League ====
Pos	Team	Pld	W	D	L	GF	GA	GD	Pts	Qualification or relegation
1	Guangzhou Evergrande Taobao (C)	30	23	3	4	68	24	+44	72	Qualification for AFC Champions League group stage
2	Beijing Sinobo Guoan	30	23	1	6	60	26	+34	70	Qualification for AFC Champions League group stage
3	Shanghai SIPG	30	20	6	4	62	26	+36	66	Qualification for AFC Champions League play-off round
4	Jiangsu Suning	30	15	8	7	60	41	+19	53	
5	Shandong Luneng Taishan	30	15	6	9	55	35	+20	51	
6	Wuhan Zall	30	12	8	10	41	41	0	44	
7	Tianjin TEDA	30	12	5	13	43	45	−2	41 (Note: Head-to-head results: Henan Jianye 2–3 Tianjin TEDA, Tianjin TEDA 2–0 Henan Jianye.)	
8	Henan Jianye	30	11	8	11	41	46	−5	41	
9	Dalian Yifang	30	10	8	12	44	51	−7	38	
10	Chongqing Dangdai Lifan	30	9	9	12	36	47	−11	36	
11	Hebei China Fortune	30	9	6	15	37	55	−18	33	
12	Guangzhou R&F	30	9	5	16	54	72	−18	32	
13	Shanghai Greenland Shenhua	30	8	6	16	43	57	−14	30	Qualification for AFC Champions League group stage (Note: Shanghai Greenland Shenhua qualified for the AFC Champions League group stage as Chinese FA Cup winners.)
14	Tianjin Tianhai (D)	30	4	13	13	40	53	−13	25	Dissolved at May 2020 after season 2019
15	Shenzhen F.C.	30	4	9	17	31	57	−26	21	
16	Beijing Renhe (R)	30	3	5	22	26	65	−39	14	Relegation to China League One

Source: CSL
Rules for classification:
- During season: 1) Points; 2) Goal difference; 3) Goals scored.
- After season: 1) Points; 2) Head-to-head points; 3) Head-to-head goal difference; 4) Head-to-head goals scored; 5) Scores of the weight ratio of the reserve league and youth leagues.
  (C) Champions; (D) Disqualified; (R) Relegated
  Notes:

==== China League One ====
Pos	Team	Pld	W	D	L	GF	GA	GD	Pts	Promotion, qualification or relegation
1	Qingdao Huanghai (C, P)	30	17	6	7	59	36	+23	57	Promotion to Super League
2	Shijiazhuang Ever Bright (P)	30	18	2	10	59	42	+17	56	Promotion to Super League
3	Guizhou Hengfeng	30	17	3	10	46	28	+18	54 (Note: Guizhou Hengfeng is ahead of Heilongjiang Lava Spring on head-to-head goal difference: Guizhou Hengfeng 2–0 Heilongjiang Lava Spring, Heilongjiang Lava Spring 2–1 Guizhou Hengfeng.)	
4	Heilongjiang Lava Spring	30	15	9	6	46	34	+12	54	
5	Changchun Yatai	30	15	8	7	52	42	+10	53	
6	Zhejiang Greentown	30	14	9	7	49	40	+9	51 (Note: Zhejiang Greentown is ahead of Inner Mongolia Zhongyou on head-to-head points: Zhejiang Greentown 2–0 Inner Mongolia Zhongyou, Inner Mongolia Zhongyou 1–1 Zhejiang Greentown.)	
7	Inner Mongolia Zhongyou	30	15	6	9	35	30	+5	51	
8	Beijing BSU	30	13	7	10	51	30	+21	46	
9	Shaanxi Chang'an Athletic	30	13	5	12	39	37	+2	44	
10	Meizhou Hakka	30	11	6	13	44	41	+3	39	
11	Guangdong South China Tiger (Note: Guangdong South China Tiger was dissolved after failing to submit the salary & bonus confirmation form.) (D, R)	30	10	6	14	41	50	−9	36	Disbanded after season
12	Nantong Zhiyun	30	8	9	13	35	38	−3	33 (Note: Nantong Zhiyun is ahead of Xinjiang Tianshan Leopard on head-to-head points: Nantong Zhiyun 4–2 Xinjiang Tianshan Leopard, Xinjiang Tianshan Leopard 2–2 Nantong Zhiyun.)	
13	Xinjiang Tianshan Leopard	30	9	6	15	39	55	−16	33	
14	Sichuan Longfor (Note: Sichuan Longfor was dissolved after failing to submit the salary & bonus confirmation form.) (D, R)	30	8	7	15	36	52	−16	31	Disbanded after season
15	Liaoning F.C. (D)	30	5	6	19	33	57	−24	21	Disbanded after season
16	Shanghai Shenxin (Note: Shanghai Shenxin was dissolved after failing to submit the salary & bonus confirmation form.) (R, D)	30	3	3	24	30	82	−52	12	Disbanded after season

Source: CFA
Rules for classification: 1) Points; 2) Head-to-head points; 3) Head-to-head goal difference; 4) Head-to-head goals scored; 5) Reserve league points; 6) Goal difference; 7) Goals scored; 8) Disciplinary points (1 point for each yellow card, 3 points for each red card); 9) Draw
(C) Champions; (D) Disqualified; (P) Promoted; (R) Relegated
Notes:

Team 1	Agg.	Team 2	1st leg	2nd leg
Hebei Aoli Jingying	2–3	Sichuan Longfor	1–0	1–3
Liaoning F.C.	1–1	Suzhou Dongwu	0–0	1–1

==== China League Two ====
===== North Group =====
Pos	Team	Pld	Pts
1	Shenyang Urban (P)	30	74
2	Taizhou Yuanda (Q)	30	71
3	Hebei Aoli Jingying (Q)	30	69
4	Zibo Cuju	30	69
5	Yinchuan Helanshan	30	61
6	Dalian Chanjoy	30	45
7	Qingdao Jonoon	30	45
8	Jiangsu Yancheng Dingli	30	33
9	Yanbian Beiguo	30	32
10	Beijing BIT	30	30
11	Jilin Baijia	30	27
12	Qingdao Red Lions	30	27
13	Baoding Yingli ETS	30	26
14	Inner Mongolia Caoshangfei (Q)	30	25
15	Xi'an Daxing Chongde (Q)	30	19
16	Shanxi Metropolis (R)	30	10

Source: CFA
(P) Promoted;
(Q) Qualified for the phase indicated;
(R) Relegated

===== South Group =====
Pos	Team	Pld	Pts
1	Chengdu Better City (P)	30	67
2	Suzhou Dongwu (Q)	30	67
3	Jiangxi Liansheng (Q)	30	61
4	Sichuan Jiuniu	30	56
5	Kunshan F.C.	30	55
6	Wuhan Three Towns	30	52
7	Fujian Tianxin	30	44
8	Zhejiang Yiteng	30	41
9	Shenzhen Pengcheng	30	35
10	Hubei Chufeng United	30	34
11	Hangzhou Wuyue Qiantang	30	34
12	Nanjing Shaye	30	32
13	Lhasa Urban Construction Investment	30	30
14	Guangxi Baoyun (Q)	30	26
15	Hunan Billows (Q)	30	20
16	Yunnan Kunlu (R)	30	13

Source: CFA
(P) Promoted;
(Q) Qualified for the phase indicated;
(R) Relegated

===== Overall table =====
Pos	Team	Pld	W	D	L	GF	GA	GD	Pts	Promotion or relegation
1	Shenyang Urban (C, P)	30	23	5	2	62	19	+43	74	China League One
2	Chengdu Better City (P)	30	20	7	3	53	12	+41	67	China League One
3	Taizhou Yuanda (O, P)	30	22	5	3	76	21	+55	71	Promotion Play-offs
4	Suzhou Dongwu (P)	30	21	4	5	54	17	+37	67	Promotion Play-offs
5	Hebei Aoli Jingying (Q)	30	21	6	3	68	20	+48	69	Promotion Play-offs
6	Jiangxi Liansheng (P)	30	19	4	7	41	21	+20	61	Promotion Play-offs
7	Zibo Cuju (Q)	30	22	3	5	60	13	+47	69 (Note: ZBS 2–2 SCJ, SCJ 2–3 ZBS.)	7th–26th place Play-offs
8	Sichuan Jiuniu (P)	30	17	5	8	47	27	+20	56	China League One
9	Kunshan F.C. (P)	30	17	4	9	45	23	+22	55 (Note: KS 3–1 YCH, YCH 0–2 KS.)	China League One
10	Yinchuan Helanshan (Note: Yinchuan Helanshan was dissolved after failing to submit the salary & bonus confirmation form.) (D, R)	30	18	7	5	57	27	+30	61	Disbanded after season
11	Wuhan Three Towns (Note: CFA awarded Hubei Chufeng United a 3–0 win as a result of Wuhan Three Towns fielding the ineligible player.) (Q)	30	14	10	6	33	18	+15	52 (Note: WHT 3–1 DLC, DLC 0–0 WHT.)	7th–26th place Play-offs
12	Dalian Chanjoy (Note: Dalian Chanjoy was dissolved after failing to submit the salary & bonus confirmation form.) (R, D, R)	30	13	6	11	63	45	+18	45	Disbanded after season
13	Fujian Tianxin (Note: Fujian Tianxin was dissolved after failing to submit the salary & bonus confirmation form.) (R, D, R, R, R)	30	13	5	12	36	42	−6	44	Disbanded after season
14	Qingdao Jonoon (Note: Qingdao Jonoon was deducted six points for failing to implement ruling of FIFA.) (Q)	30	14	9	7	39	18	+21	45	7th–26th place Play-offs
15	Jiangsu Yancheng Dingli (Q)	30	8	9	13	33	37	−4	33 (Note: JYD 2–0 ZJY, ZJY 1–2 JYD.)	7th–26th place Play-offs
16	Zhejiang Yiteng (Q)	30	12	5	13	34	41	−7	41	7th–26th place Play-offs
17	Shenzhen Pengcheng (R, D, R, R)	30	8	11	11	25	29	−4	35 (Note: SZP 5–0 YAB, YAB 1–4 SZP.)	Disbanded after season
18	Yanbian Beiguo (Note: Yanbian Beiguo was dissolved after failing to submit the salary & bonus confirmation form.) (D, R)	30	9	5	16	33	57	−24	32	Disbanded after season
19	Hubei Chufeng United (Q)	30	8	10	12	27	39	−12	34	7th–26th place Play-offs
20	Beijing BIT (Q)	30	9	3	18	36	61	−25	30	7th–26th place Play-offs
21	Hangzhou Wuyue Qiantang (R, R)	30	10	4	16	38	55	−17	34 (Note: HZW 0–0 JLB, JLB 1–2 HZW.)	Disbanded after season
22	Jilin Baijia (Note: Jilin Baijia was dissolved after failing to submit the salary & bonus confirmation form.) (R, R, R)	30	7	6	17	24	46	−22	27	Disbanded after season
23	Nanjing Shaye (Note: Nanjing Shaye was dissolved after failing to submit the salary & bonus confirmation form.) (R, R, R, R)	30	7	11	12	24	34	−10	32 (Note: NJS 1–0 QDR, QDR 2–1 NJS.)	Disbanded after season
24	Qingdao Red Lions (Q)	30	7	6	17	25	53	−28	27	7th–26th place Play-offs
25	Baoding Yingli ETS (Note: Baoding Yingli ETS was deducted six points for failing to implement ruling of CFA.) (R, D)	30	9	5	16	36	42	−6	32 (Note: BDY 4–0 LSC, LSC 5–2 BDY.)	Disbanded after season
26	Lhasa Urban Construction Investment (D, R)	30	8	6	16	29	39	−10	30 (Note: BDR)	Disbanded after season
27	Guangxi Baoyun (O)	30	7	5	18	23	40	−17	26	Relegation play-offs
28	Hunan Billows (O)	30	5	5	20	17	59	−42	20	Relegation play-offs
29	Inner Mongolia Caoshangfei (O)	30	6	7	17	26	63	−37	25	Relegation play-offs
30	Xi'an Daxing Chongde (T)	30	5	4	21	18	64	−46	19	Spared from relegation
31	Yunnan Kunlu (T)	30	1	10	19	21	51	−30	13	Spared from relegation
32	Shanxi Metropolis (T)	30	2	4	24	12	82	−70	10	Spared from relegation

Updated to match(es) played on 12 October 2019. Source: CFA
Rules for classification: 1) Points; 2) Head-to-head points; 3) Head-to-head goal difference; 4) Head-to-head goals scored; 5) Goal difference; 6) Goals scored; 7) Disciplinary points (1 point for each yellow card, 3 points for each red card)
(C) Champions; (D) Disqualified; (O) Play-off winners; (P) Promoted; (Q) Qualified for the phase indicated; (R) Relegated; (T) Readmitted

==== Chinese FA Super Cup ====
23 February 2019
19:35

Shanghai SIPG	2–0	Beijing Sinobo Guoan
Wang Shenchao 62'; Lü Wenjun 66'	Report (Sina Sport); Report (Soccerway)

Suzhou Olympic Sports Centre, Suzhou
Attendance: 25,132
Referee: Zhang Lei (Dalian FA)
