= 2019 AFC Champions League group stage =

Football tournament group stage

The 2019 AFC Champions League group stage was played from 4 March to 29 May 2019. A total of 32 teams competed in the group stage to decide the 16 places in the knockout stage of the 2019 AFC Champions League. The postponement of Group A fixture between Zob Ahan and Al-Nassr made the group stage conclude a week behind schedule.

== Draw ==
The draw for the group stage was held on 22 November 2018, 16:30 MYT (UTC+8), at the AFC House in Kuala Lumpur, Malaysia. The 32 teams were drawn into eight groups of four: four groups each in the West Region (Groups A–D) and the East Region (Groups E–H). Teams from the same association could not be drawn into the same group.

The mechanism of the draw was as follows:

- For the West Region, there was no associations draw due to country protection. A draw was held for each of the four associations with more than one direct entrant (United Arab Emirates, Saudi Arabia, Qatar, Iran) to determine for each team their group positions:
  - The three direct entrants of the United Arab Emirates were drawn to positions A1, B2, or C3, while the play-off winners West 1 (which their play-off team may advance from) were allocated to position D4.
  - The three direct entrants of Saudi Arabia were drawn to positions B1, C2, or D3, while the play-off winners West 2 (which their play-off team may advance from) were allocated to position A4.
  - The two direct entrants of Qatar were drawn to positions C1 or D2, while the play-off winners West 3 and 4 (which their play-off teams may advance from) were drawn to positions A3 or B4.
  - The two direct entrants of Iran were drawn to positions D1 or C4.
  - The direct entrants of Uzbekistan and Iraq were allocated to positions B3 and A2 respectively.
- For the East Region, a draw was held for the two associations with three direct entrants (South Korea, China) to determine the order of associations. After the associations draw, a draw was held for each of the four associations with more than one direct entrant (South Korea, China, Japan, Australia) to determine for each team their group positions:
  - The three direct entrants of the first association drawn (South Korea or China) were drawn to positions E1, F2, or G3, while the play-off winners East 1 or 2 (which their play-off team may advance from) were allocated to position H4.
  - The three direct entrants of the second association drawn (South Korea or China) were drawn to positions F1, G2, or H3, while the play-off winners East 1 or 2 (which their play-off team may advance from) were allocated to position E4.
  - The two direct entrants of Japan were drawn to positions G1 or H2, while the play-off winners East 3 and 4 (which their play-off teams may advance from) were either allocated to F4 and E3 respectively (if South Korea were the first association drawn), or drawn to positions E3 or F4 (if China were the first association drawn).
  - The two direct entrants of Australia were either drawn to positions H1 or F3 (if South Korea were the first association drawn, or if China were the first association drawn and the play-off winners East 4 were drawn to position E3), or positions H1 or E2 (if China were the first association drawn and the play-off winners East 3 were drawn to position E3).
  - The direct entrants of Thailand and Malaysia were allocated to either positions G4 and E2 (if South Korea were the first association drawn), positions F3 and G4 (if China were the first association drawn and the play-off winners East 4 were drawn to position E3), or positions E2 and G4 (if China were the first association drawn and the play-off winners East 3 were drawn to position E3) respectively.

The following 32 teams entered into the group stage draw, which included the 24 direct entrants and the eight winners of the play-off round of the qualifying play-offs, whose identity was not known at the time of the draw.

Region	Groups	Teams			
West Region	A–D	(United Arab Emirates) Al-Ain	(United Arab Emirates) Al-Wahda	(United Arab Emirates) Al-Wasl	(Uzbekistan) Pakhtakor (Winners of Play-off West 1)
West Region	A–D	(Saudi Arabia) Al-Hilal	(Saudi Arabia) Al-Ittihad	(Saudi Arabia) Al-Ahli	(Saudi Arabia) Al-Nassr (Winners of Play-off West 2)
West Region	A–D	(Qatar) Al-Duhail	(Qatar) Al-Sadd	(Qatar) Al-Rayyan (Winners of Play-off West 3)	(Iran) Zob Ahan (Winners of Play-off West 4)
West Region	A–D	(Iran) Persepolis	(Iran) Esteghlal	(Uzbekistan) Lokomotiv Tashkent (Note: The identity of the first group stage team from Uzbekistan, the second and third group stage teams from South Korea, and the second group stage teams from China and Japan was not known at the time of the group stage draw.)	(Iraq) Al-Zawraa
East Region	E–H	(South Korea) Jeonbuk Hyundai Motors	(South Korea) Daegu FC	(South Korea) Gyeongnam FC	(South Korea) Ulsan Hyundai (Winners of Play-off East 1)
East Region	E–H	(China) Shanghai SIPG	(China) Beijing FC	(China) Guangzhou Evergrande	(China) Shandong Luneng (Winners of Play-off East 2)
East Region	E–H	(Japan) Kawasaki Frontale	(Japan) Urawa Red Diamonds	(Japan) Sanfrecce Hiroshima (Winners of Play-off East 3)	(Japan) Kashima Antlers (Winners of Play-off East 4)
East Region	E–H	(Australia) Sydney FC	(Australia) Melbourne Victory	(Thailand) Buriram United	(Malaysia) Johor Darul Ta'zim

== Format ==
In the group stage, each group was played on a home-and-away round-robin basis. The winners and runners-up of each group advanced to the round of 16 of the knockout stage.

=== Tiebreakers ===
The teams were ranked according to points (3 points for a win, 1 point for a draw, 0 points for a loss). If tied on points, tiebreakers were applied in the following order (Regulations Article 10.5):

1. Points in head-to-head matches among tied teams;
2. Goal difference in head-to-head matches among tied teams;
3. Goals scored in head-to-head matches among tied teams;
4. Away goals scored in head-to-head matches among tied teams;
5. If more than two teams were tied, and after applying all head-to-head criteria above, a subset of teams were still tied, all head-to-head criteria above were reapplied exclusively to this subset of teams;
6. Goal difference in all group matches;
7. Goals scored in all group matches;
8. Penalty shoot-out if only two teams playing each other in the last round of the group were tied;
9. Disciplinary points (yellow card = 1 point, red card as a result of two yellow cards = 3 points, direct red card = 3 points, yellow card followed by direct red card = 4 points);
10. Association ranking.

== Schedule ==
The schedule of each matchday was as follows.

- Matches in the West Region were played on Mondays and Tuesdays. Two groups were played on each day, with the following groups played on Mondays:
  - Matchdays 1 and 2: Groups A and B
  - Matchday 3: Groups A and C
  - Matchday 4: Groups B and D
  - Matchdays 5 and 6: Groups C and D
- Matches in the East Region were played on Tuesdays and Wednesdays. Two groups were played on each day, with the following groups played on Tuesdays:
  - Matchdays 1 and 2: Groups E and F
  - Matchday 3: Groups E and G
  - Matchday 4: Groups F and H
  - Matchdays 5 and 6: Groups G and H

Matchday	Dates	Matches
Matchday 1	4–6 March 2019	Team 1 vs. Team 4, Team 3 vs. Team 2
Matchday 2	11–13 March 2019	Team 4 vs. Team 3, Team 2 vs. Team 1
Matchday 3	8–10 April 2019	Team 4 vs. Team 2, Team 1 vs. Team 3
Matchday 4	22–24 April 2019	Team 2 vs. Team 4, Team 3 vs. Team 1
Matchday 5	6–8 May 2019	Team 4 vs. Team 1, Team 2 vs. Team 3
Matchday 6	20–22 May 2019	Team 1 vs. Team 2, Team 3 vs. Team 4

== Groups ==
=== Group A ===
Pos	Team	Pld	W	D	L	GF	GA	GD	Pts	Qualification	ZOB	NAS	ZAW	WAS
1	(Iran) Zob Ahan	6	3	3	0	10	5	+5	12	Advance to knockout stage	—	0–0	0–0	2–0
2	(Saudi Arabia) Al-Nassr	6	3	1	2	11	7	+4	10	Advance to knockout stage	2–3	—	4–1	3–1
3	(Iraq) Al-Zawraa	6	2	2	2	14	9	+5	8		2–2	1–2	—	5–0
4	(United Arab Emirates) Al-Wasl	6	1	0	5	4	18	−14	3		1–3	1–0	1–5	—

Source: AFC
Rules for classification: Group stage tiebreakers
4 March 2019
19:20 UTC+4

Al-Wasl (United Arab Emirates)	1–0	(Saudi Arabia) Al-Nassr
Fabio Lima 62' (pen.)	Live Report; Stats Report

Zabeel Stadium, Dubai
Attendance: 5,370
Referee: Peter Green (Australia)
4 March 2019
19:00 UTC+3:30

Zob Ahan (Iran)	0–0	(Iraq) Al-Zawraa
	Live Report; Stats Report

Foolad Shahr Stadium, Isfahan
Attendance: 2,433
Referee: Fu Ming (China)

11 March 2019
17:00 UTC+3

Al-Zawraa (Iraq)	5–0	(United Arab Emirates) Al-Wasl
Saeed 22'; Abbas 36', 51'; Abdul-Raheem 75'; Jwayed 84' (pen.)	Live Report; Stats Report

Karbala Sports City, Karbala
Attendance: 27,500
Referee: Mohd Amirul Izwan Yaacob (Malaysia)
11 March 2019
19:45 UTC+4

Al-Nassr (Saudi Arabia)	2–3	(Iran) Zob Ahan
Giuliano 5'; Hamdallah 58' (pen.)	Live Report; Stats Report	Nejadmehdi 30'; Mohammadzadeh 39'; Motahari 90+1'

Al Maktoum Stadium, Dubai (United Arab Emirates) (Note: Matches between teams from Iran and Saudi Arabia were played on neutral venues due to deterioration of Iran–Saudi Arabia relations.)
Attendance: 2,850
Referee: Ma Ning (China)

8 April 2019
19:40 UTC+4

Al-Wasl (United Arab Emirates)	1–3	(Iran) Zob Ahan
Caio 14'	Live Report; Stats Report	Osaguona 16'; Motahari 35'; Bou Hamdan 86'

Zabeel Stadium, Dubai
Attendance: 620
Referee: Yudai Yamamoto (Japan)
8 April 2019
20:15 UTC+3

Al-Nassr (Saudi Arabia)	4–1	(Iraq) Al-Zawraa
Al Salem 24' (pen.); Al-Shehri 29'; Hawsawi 59'; Giuliano 90+4'	Live Report; Stats Report	Fadhel 12'

King Fahd International Stadium, Riyadh
Attendance: 3,228
Referee: Jumpei Iida (Japan)

23 April 2019
18:00 UTC+3

Al-Zawraa (Iraq)	1–2	(Saudi Arabia) Al-Nassr
Abbas 30'	Live Report; Stats Report	Al-Shehri 56'; Al-Farshan 90+8'

Karbala Sports City, Karbala
Attendance: 27,500
Referee: Ahmed Al-Kaf (Oman)
23 April 2019
20:00 UTC+4:30

Zob Ahan (Iran)	2–0	(United Arab Emirates) Al-Wasl
Cheraghali 2'; Motahari 15'	Live Report; Stats Report

Foolad Shahr Stadium, Isfahan
Attendance: 3,560
Referee: Ko Hyung-jin (South Korea)

7 May 2019
21:30 UTC+3

Al-Zawraa (Iraq)	2–2	(Iran) Zob Ahan
Abbas 44'; Abdul-Raheem 61'	Live Report; Stats Report	Niknafs 28'; Habibzadeh 90+2'

Karbala Sports City, Karbala
Attendance: 7,621
Referee: Hettikamkanamge Perera (Sri Lanka)
7 May 2019
22:00 UTC+3

Al-Nassr (Saudi Arabia)	3–1	(United Arab Emirates) Al-Wasl
Giuliano 30'; Al-Jumeiah 34'; Al Salem 56'	Live Report; Stats Report	Khamis 90'

King Fahd International Stadium, Riyadh
Attendance: 3,876
Referee: Ma Ning (China)

21 May 2019
22:00 UTC+4

Al-Wasl (United Arab Emirates)	1–5	(Iraq) Al-Zawraa
Mohammed 5'	Live Report; Stats Report	Abbas 22', 45+1'; Fadhel 39'; Jalal 51'; Abdul-Raheem 59'

Zabeel Stadium, Dubai
Attendance: 365
Referee: Hiroyuki Kimura (Japan)
29 May 2019 (Note: The Zob Ahan v Al-Nassr match, originally scheduled to be played on 21 May 2019, 21:00 UTC+3, at Karbala Sports City, Karbala (Iraq), was postponed due to safety concerns. The match was rescheduled to 29 May 2019 and moved to a new venue.)
21:30 UTC+3

Zob Ahan (Iran)	0–0	(Saudi Arabia) Al-Nassr
	Live Report; Stats Report

Grand Hamad Stadium, Doha (Qatar)
Attendance: 456
Referee: Valentin Kovalenko (Uzbekistan)

=== Group B ===
Pos	Team	Pld	W	D	L	GF	GA	GD	Pts	Qualification	WAH	ITH	LOK	RAY
1	(United Arab Emirates) Al-Wahda	6	4	1	1	14	9	+5	13	Advance to knockout stage	—	4–1	3–1	4–3
2	(Saudi Arabia) Al-Ittihad	6	3	2	1	13	9	+4	11	Advance to knockout stage	1–1	—	3–2	5–1
3	(Uzbekistan) Lokomotiv Tashkent	6	2	1	3	10	11	−1	7		2–0	1–1	—	3–2
4	(Qatar) Al-Rayyan	6	1	0	5	9	17	−8	3		1–2	0–2	2–1	—

Source: AFC
Rules for classification: Group stage tiebreakers
4 March 2019
16:00 UTC+5

Lokomotiv Tashkent (Uzbekistan)	2–0	(United Arab Emirates) Al-Wahda
Abdukholiqov 5'; Tukhtakhodjaev 90+3'	Live Report; Stats Report

Lokomotiv Stadium, Tashkent
Attendance: 3,151
Referee: Ko Hyung-jin (South Korea)
4 March 2019
20:35 UTC+3

Al-Ittihad (Saudi Arabia)	5–1	(Qatar) Al-Rayyan
Al-Muwallad 45', 78'; Al-Aryani 45+1'; Al-Sahafi 48'; Al-Ghamdi 70' (pen.)	Live Report; Stats Report	Viera 23'

King Abdullah Sports City, Jeddah
Attendance: 54
Referee: Minoru Tōjō (Japan)

11 March 2019
18:35 UTC+3

Al-Rayyan (Qatar)	2–1	(Uzbekistan) Lokomotiv Tashkent
Lucca 38'; Rivas 58'	Live Report; Stats Report	Turapov 4'

Jassim bin Hamad Stadium, Al Rayyan
Attendance: 1,103
Referee: Hiroyuki Kimura (Japan)
11 March 2019
19:00 UTC+4

Al-Wahda (United Arab Emirates)	4–1	(Saudi Arabia) Al-Ittihad
Al-Menhali 16'; Leonardo 52', 90+1'; Matar 80'	Live Report; Stats Report	Al-Shamrani 56'

Al Nahyan Stadium, Abu Dhabi
Attendance: 2,779
Referee: Ahmed Al-Ali (Jordan)

9 April 2019
18:45 UTC+3

Al-Rayyan (Qatar)	1–2	(United Arab Emirates) Al-Wahda
Rivas 52'	Live Report; Stats Report	Tagliabúe 67'; Leonardo 90+3' (pen.)

Jassim bin Hamad Stadium, Al Rayyan
Attendance: 1,308
Referee: Kim Dong-jin (South Korea)
9 April 2019
20:45 UTC+3

Al-Ittihad (Saudi Arabia)	3–2	(Uzbekistan) Lokomotiv Tashkent
Al-Shamrani 48' (pen.); Al-Muwallad 50', 90+4' (pen.)	Live Report; Stats Report	Iskanderov 70'; Rajevac 82'

King Abdullah Sports City, Jeddah
Attendance: 50
Referee: Sivakorn Pu-udom (Thailand)

22 April 2019
18:00 UTC+5

Lokomotiv Tashkent (Uzbekistan)	1–1	(Saudi Arabia) Al-Ittihad
Abdukholiqov 36'	Live Report; Stats Report	Romarinho 12'

Lokomotiv Stadium, Tashkent
Attendance: 4,267
Referee: Fu Ming (China)
22 April 2019
19:20 UTC+4

Al-Wahda (United Arab Emirates)	4–3	(Qatar) Al-Rayyan
Leonardo 8', 56', 82', 89'	Live Report; Stats Report	Soria 2'; Rivas 6', 21'

Al Nahyan Stadium, Abu Dhabi
Attendance: 3,727
Referee: Hiroyuki Kimura (Japan)

7 May 2019
22:00 UTC+4

Al-Wahda (United Arab Emirates)	3–1	(Uzbekistan) Lokomotiv Tashkent
Tagliabúe 59'; Leonardo 77' (pen.); Ibrahim 90+1'	Live Report; Stats Report	Abdukholiqov 47'

Al Nahyan Stadium, Abu Dhabi
Attendance: 1,160
Referee: Liu Kwok Man (Hong Kong)
7 May 2019
21:30 UTC+3

Al-Rayyan (Qatar)	0–2	(Saudi Arabia) Al-Ittihad
	Live Report; Stats Report	Al-Shamrani 62'; Romarinho 67'

Jassim bin Hamad Stadium, Al Rayyan
Attendance: 1,096
Referee: Muhammad Taqi (Singapore)

21 May 2019
19:00 UTC+5

Lokomotiv Tashkent (Uzbekistan)	3–2	(Qatar) Al-Rayyan
Mirzaev 35'; Abdukholiqov 47', 61'	Live Report; Stats Report	Tabata 1'; Viera 22'

Lokomotiv Stadium, Tashkent
Attendance: 2,540
Referee: Ma Ning (China)
21 May 2019
22:00 UTC+3

Al-Ittihad (Saudi Arabia)	1–1	(United Arab Emirates) Al-Wahda
Romarinho 68'	Live Report; Stats Report	Al-Menhali 71'

King Abdullah Sports City, Jeddah
Attendance: 30,166
Referee: Nawaf Shukralla (Bahrain)

=== Group C ===
Pos	Team	Pld	W	D	L	GF	GA	GD	Pts	Qualification	HIL	DUH	EST	AIN
1	(Saudi Arabia) Al-Hilal	6	4	1	1	10	5	+5	13	Advance to knockout stage	—	3–1	1–0	2–0
2	(Qatar) Al-Duhail	6	2	3	1	11	8	+3	9	Advance to knockout stage	2–2	—	3–0	2–2
3	(Iran) Esteghlal	6	2	2	2	6	8	−2	8		2–1	1–1	—	1–1
4	(United Arab Emirates) Al-Ain	6	0	2	4	4	10	−6	2		0–1	0–2	1–2	—

Source: AFC
Rules for classification: Group stage tiebreakers
5 March 2019
18:15 UTC+3

Al-Duhail (Qatar)	3–0	(Iran) Esteghlal
Benatia 56'; El-Arabi 73'; Afif 90+1'	Live Report; Stats Report

Abdullah bin Khalifa Stadium, Doha
Attendance: 6,888
Referee: Ravshan Irmatov (Uzbekistan)
5 March 2019
19:20 UTC+4

Al-Ain (United Arab Emirates)	0–1	(Saudi Arabia) Al-Hilal
	Live Report; Stats Report	Al-Shalhoub 65'

Hazza bin Zayed Stadium, Al Ain
Attendance: 9,726
Referee: Nawaf Shukralla (Bahrain)

12 March 2019
19:00 UTC+3:30

Esteghlal (Iran)	1–1	(United Arab Emirates) Al-Ain
Bagheri 53'	Live Report; Stats Report	Shiotani 85'

Azadi Stadium, Tehran
Attendance: 65,178
Referee: Ahmed Al-Kaf (Oman)
12 March 2019
18:45 UTC+3

Al-Hilal (Saudi Arabia)	3–1	(Qatar) Al-Duhail
Carlos Eduardo 25'; Al-Bulaihi 77'; Gomis 79'	Live Report; Stats Report	Nakajima 75'

King Saud University Stadium, Riyadh
Attendance: 22,929
Referee: Hettikamkanamge Perera (Sri Lanka)

8 April 2019
18:30 UTC+3

Al-Duhail (Qatar)	2–2	(United Arab Emirates) Al-Ain
Boudiaf 9'; El-Arabi 32'	Live Report; Stats Report	Maroof 36'; Berg 58'

Abdullah bin Khalifa Stadium, Doha
Attendance: 6,300
Referee: Ma Ning (China)
8 April 2019
20:00 UTC+3

Esteghlal (Iran)	2–1	(Saudi Arabia) Al-Hilal
A. Karimi 5'; Montazeri 30'	Live Report; Stats Report	Gomis 71'

Hamad bin Khalifa Stadium, Doha (Qatar)
Attendance: 947
Referee: Chris Beath (Australia)

23 April 2019
19:00 UTC+4

Al-Hilal (Saudi Arabia)	1–0	(Iran) Esteghlal
Giovinco 51'	Live Report; Stats Report

Mohammed Bin Zayed Stadium, Abu Dhabi (United Arab Emirates)
Attendance: 2,212
Referee: Ryuji Sato (Japan)
23 April 2019
20:00 UTC+4

Al-Ain (United Arab Emirates)	0–2	(Qatar) Al-Duhail
	Live Report; Stats Report	Ali 3'; El-Arabi 66'

Hazza bin Zayed Stadium, Al Ain
Attendance: 6,126
Referee: Muhammad Taqi (Singapore)

6 May 2019
20:30 UTC+4:30

Esteghlal (Iran)	1–1	(Qatar) Al-Duhail
Cheshmi 53'	Live Report; Stats Report	Edmilson 55'

Azadi Stadium, Tehran
Attendance: 37,400
Referee: Adham Makhadmeh (Jordan)
6 May 2019
22:00 UTC+3

Al-Hilal (Saudi Arabia)	2–0	(United Arab Emirates) Al-Ain
Bahebri 1'; Al-Shalhoub 90'	Live Report; Stats Report

King Saud University Stadium, Riyadh
Attendance: 12,105
Referee: Valentin Kovalenko (Uzbekistan)

20 May 2019
21:00 UTC+3

Al-Duhail (Qatar)	2–2	(Saudi Arabia) Al-Hilal
El-Arabi 15'; Muneer 90+2'	Live Report; Stats Report	Gomis 29', 55'

Abdullah bin Khalifa Stadium, Doha
Attendance: 4,170
Referee: Minoru Tōjō (Japan)
20 May 2019
22:00 UTC+4

Al-Ain (United Arab Emirates)	1–2	(Iran) Esteghlal
Berg 13'	Live Report; Stats Report	Daneshgar 22'; Tabrizi 45+1'

Hazza bin Zayed Stadium, Al Ain
Attendance: 1,126
Referee: Ko Hyung-jin (South Korea)

=== Group D ===
Pos	Team	Pld	W	D	L	GF	GA	GD	Pts	Qualification	SAD	AHL	PAK	PER
1	(Qatar) Al-Sadd	6	3	1	2	7	8	−1	10	Advance to knockout stage	—	2–1	2–1	1–0
2	(Saudi Arabia) Al-Ahli	6	3	0	3	7	7	0	9	Advance to knockout stage	2–0	—	2–1	2–1
3	(Uzbekistan) Pakhtakor	6	2	2	2	7	7	0	8		2–2	1–0	—	1–0
4	(Iran) Persepolis	6	2	1	3	6	5	+1	7		2–0	2–0	1–1	—

Source: AFC
Rules for classification: Group stage tiebreakers
5 March 2019
18:30 UTC+3:30

Persepolis (Iran)	1–1	(Uzbekistan) Pakhtakor
Budimir 25'	Live Report; Stats Report	Bikmaev 5'

Azadi Stadium, Tehran
Attendance: 46,350
Referee: Adham Makhadmeh (Jordan)
5 March 2019
20:15 UTC+3

Al-Ahli (Saudi Arabia)	2–0	(Qatar) Al-Sadd
Al Somah 32' (pen.), 76'	Live Report; Stats Report

King Abdullah Sports City, Jeddah
Attendance: 7,328
Referee: Ryuji Sato (Japan)

12 March 2019
18:00 UTC+5

Pakhtakor (Uzbekistan)	1–0	(Saudi Arabia) Al-Ahli
Bikmaev 62'	Live Report; Stats Report

Pakhtakor Central Stadium, Tashkent
Attendance: 25,250
Referee: Muhammad Taqi (Singapore)
12 March 2019
18:45 UTC+3

Al-Sadd (Qatar)	1–0	(Iran) Persepolis
Bounedjah 90+5'	Live Report; Stats Report

Jassim bin Hamad Stadium, Al Rayyan
Attendance: 8,053
Referee: Kim Dong-jin (South Korea)

9 April 2019
19:00 UTC+5

Pakhtakor (Uzbekistan)	2–2	(Qatar) Al-Sadd
Alijonov 9'; Ćeran 41'	Live Report; Stats Report	Xavi 6', 16'

Pakhtakor Central Stadium, Tashkent
Attendance: 32,315
Referee: Fu Ming (China)
9 April 2019
19:30 UTC+4

Persepolis (Iran)	2–0	(Saudi Arabia) Al-Ahli
Khalilzadeh 18'; Alipour 48'	Live Report; Stats Report

Zabeel Stadium, Dubai (United Arab Emirates)
Attendance: 1,878
Referee: Hiroyuki Kimura (Japan)

22 April 2019
19:30 UTC+4

Al-Ahli (Saudi Arabia)	2–1	(Iran) Persepolis
Al Somah 30' (pen.), 83'	Live Report; Stats Report	Khalilzadeh 90+3'

Al Maktoum Stadium, Dubai (United Arab Emirates)
Attendance: 787
Referee: Ma Ning (China)
22 April 2019
19:00 UTC+3

Al-Sadd (Qatar)	2–1	(Uzbekistan) Pakhtakor
Xavi 9'; Bounedjah 87'	Live Report; Stats Report	Krimets 30'

Jassim bin Hamad Stadium, Al Rayyan
Attendance: 4,692
Referee: Jumpei Iida (Japan)

6 May 2019
20:00 UTC+5

Pakhtakor (Uzbekistan)	1–0	(Iran) Persepolis
Sergeev 86'	Live Report; Stats Report

Pakhtakor Central Stadium, Tashkent
Attendance: 17,350
Referee: Chris Beath (Australia)
6 May 2019
21:45 UTC+3

Al-Sadd (Qatar)	2–1	(Saudi Arabia) Al-Ahli
Asad 9'; Afif 12'	Live Report; Stats Report	Al Somah 51' (pen.)

Jassim bin Hamad Stadium, Al Rayyan
Attendance: 6,683
Referee: Ko Hyung-jin (South Korea)

20 May 2019
21:00 UTC+4:30

Persepolis (Iran)	2–0	(Qatar) Al-Sadd
Torabi 16'; Alipour 67'	Live Report; Stats Report

Azadi Stadium, Tehran
Attendance: 11,390
Referee: Hettikamkanamge Perera (Sri Lanka)
20 May 2019
22:00 UTC+3

Al-Ahli (Saudi Arabia)	2–1	(Uzbekistan) Pakhtakor
Al Somah 69'; Ghareeb 90+2'	Live Report; Stats Report	Sergeev 88'

King Abdullah Sports City, Jeddah
Attendance: 23,183
Referee: Ryuji Sato (Japan)

=== Group E ===
Pos	Team	Pld	W	D	L	GF	GA	GD	Pts	Qualification	SDL	KAS	GYE	JDT
1	(China) Shandong Luneng	6	3	2	1	10	8	+2	11	Advance to knockout stage	—	2–2	2–1	2–1
2	(Japan) Kashima Antlers	6	3	1	2	9	8	+1	10	Advance to knockout stage	2–1	—	0–1	2–1
3	(South Korea) Gyeongnam FC	6	2	2	2	9	8	+1	8		2–2	2–3	—	2–0
4	(Malaysia) Johor Darul Ta'zim	6	1	1	4	4	8	−4	4		0–1	1–0	1–1	—

Source: AFC
Rules for classification: Group stage tiebreakers
5 March 2019
19:00 UTC+9

Kashima Antlers (Japan)	2–1	(Malaysia) Johor Darul Ta'zim
Hirato 43'; Serginho 56'	Live Report; Stats Report	Diogo 80'

Kashima Soccer Stadium, Kashima
Attendance: 6,425
Referee: Turki Al-Khudhayr (Saudi Arabia)
5 March 2019
19:30 UTC+9

Gyeongnam FC (South Korea)	2–2	(China) Shandong Luneng
Woo Joo-sung 60'; Kim Seung-jun 68'	Live Report; Stats Report	Pellè 21', 77'

Changwon Football Center, Changwon
Attendance: 4,229
Referee: Ammar Al-Jeneibi (United Arab Emirates)

12 March 2019
15:30 UTC+8

Shandong Luneng (China)	2–2	(Japan) Kashima Antlers
Pellè 20' (pen.), 41'	Live Report; Stats Report	Ito 10', 14'

Jinan Olympic Sports Center Stadium, Jinan
Attendance: 12,185
Referee: Mooud Bonyadifar (Iran)
12 March 2019
20:45 UTC+8

Johor Darul Ta'zim (Malaysia)	1–1	(South Korea) Gyeongnam FC
Diogo 68' (pen.)	Live Report; Stats Report	Kwak Tae-hwi 52'

Larkin Stadium, Johor Bahru
Attendance: 16,130
Referee: Mohanad Qasim (Iraq)

9 April 2019
18:30 UTC+9

Gyeongnam FC (South Korea)	2–3	(Japan) Kashima Antlers
Inukai 56' (o.g.); Mutch 71'	Live Report; Stats Report	Woo Joo-sung 75' (o.g.); Kanamori 90+1'; Serginho 90+3'

Changwon Football Center, Changwon
Attendance: 2,194
Referee: Ahmed Al-Kaf (Oman)
9 April 2019
19:30 UTC+8

Shandong Luneng (China)	2–1	(Malaysia) Johor Darul Ta'zim
Fellaini 30'; Pellè 39' (pen.)	Live Report; Stats Report	Safawi 59'

Jinan Olympic Sports Center Stadium, Jinan
Attendance: 11,602
Referee: Adham Makhadmeh (Jordan)

24 April 2019
19:00 UTC+9

Kashima Antlers (Japan)	0–1	(South Korea) Gyeongnam FC
	Live Report; Stats Report	Kunimoto 63'

Kashima Soccer Stadium, Kashima
Attendance: 7,193
Referee: Ali Sabah (Iraq)
24 April 2019
20:45 UTC+8

Johor Darul Ta'zim (Malaysia)	0–1	(China) Shandong Luneng
	Live Report; Stats Report	Pellè 22'

Larkin Stadium, Johor Bahru
Attendance: 13,960
Referee: Khamis Al-Marri (Qatar)

8 May 2019
19:30 UTC+8

Shandong Luneng (China)	2–1	(South Korea) Gyeongnam FC
Hao Junmin 64'; Fellaini 87'	Live Report; Stats Report	Kim Seung-jun 43'

Jinan Olympic Sports Center Stadium, Jinan
Attendance: 17,203
Referee: Turki Al-Khudhayr (Saudi Arabia)
8 May 2019
20:45 UTC+8

Johor Darul Ta'zim (Malaysia)	1–0	(Japan) Kashima Antlers
Syafiq 69'	Live Report; Stats Report

Larkin Stadium, Johor Bahru
Attendance: 4,860
Referee: Mohanad Qasim (Iraq)

22 May 2019
19:00 UTC+9

Gyeongnam FC (South Korea)	2–0	(Malaysia) Johor Darul Ta'zim
Castaignos 65'; Kunimoto 90+4'	Live Report; Stats Report

Changwon Football Center, Changwon
Attendance: 1,514
Referee: Alireza Faghani (Iran)
22 May 2019
19:00 UTC+9

Kashima Antlers (Japan)	2–1	(China) Shandong Luneng
Ito 68', 70'	Live Report; Stats Report	Fellaini 11'

Kashima Soccer Stadium, Kashima
Attendance: 8,836
Referee: Khamis Al-Kuwari (Qatar)

=== Group F ===
Pos	Team	Pld	W	D	L	GF	GA	GD	Pts	Qualification	SAN	GZE	DAE	MVC
1	(Japan) Sanfrecce Hiroshima	6	5	0	1	9	4	+5	15	Advance to knockout stage	—	1–0	2–0	2–1
2	(China) Guangzhou Evergrande	6	3	1	2	9	5	+4	10	Advance to knockout stage	2–0	—	1–0	4–0
3	(South Korea) Daegu FC	6	3	0	3	10	6	+4	9		0–1	3–1	—	4–0
4	(Australia) Melbourne Victory	6	0	1	5	4	17	−13	1		1–3	1–1	1–3	—

Source: AFC
Rules for classification: Group stage tiebreakers
5 March 2019
19:30 UTC+11

Melbourne Victory (Australia)	1–3	(South Korea) Daegu FC
Toivonen 29'	Live Report; Stats Report	Cesinha 31'; Hwang Soon-min 51'; Edgar 61'

Melbourne Rectangular Stadium, Melbourne
Attendance: 5,572
Referee: Alireza Faghani (Iran)
5 March 2019
20:00 UTC+8

Guangzhou Evergrande (China)	2–0	(Japan) Sanfrecce Hiroshima
Talisca 19'; Paulinho 26'	Live Report; Stats Report

Tianhe Stadium, Guangzhou
Attendance: 48,216
Referee: Abdulrahman Al-Jassim (Qatar)

12 March 2019
19:00 UTC+9

Sanfrecce Hiroshima (Japan)	2–1	(Australia) Melbourne Victory
Higashi 3'; Watari 86'	Live Report; Stats Report	Honda 71'

Hiroshima Big Arch, Hiroshima
Attendance: 8,968
Referee: Ali Sabah (Iraq)
12 March 2019
19:30 UTC+9

Daegu FC (South Korea)	3–1	(China) Guangzhou Evergrande
Edgar 24', 43'; Kim Dae-won 81'	Live Report; Stats Report	Talisca 53'

DGB Daegu Bank Park, Daegu
Attendance: 11,064
Referee: Khamis Al-Marri (Qatar)

10 April 2019
19:00 UTC+9

Sanfrecce Hiroshima (Japan)	2–0	(South Korea) Daegu FC
Vieira 10' (pen.); Watari 26'	Live Report; Stats Report

Hiroshima Big Arch, Hiroshima
Attendance: 2,611
Referee: Ahmed Al-Ali (Jordan)
10 April 2019
20:00 UTC+8

Guangzhou Evergrande (China)	4–0	(Australia) Melbourne Victory
Talisca 6', 10'; Yang Liyu 42'; Broxham 73' (o.g.)	Live Report; Stats Report

Tianhe Stadium, Guangzhou
Attendance: 37,531
Referee: Ammar Al-Jeneibi (United Arab Emirates)

23 April 2019
19:30 UTC+10

Melbourne Victory (Australia)	1–1	(China) Guangzhou Evergrande
Ingham 26'	Live Report; Stats Report	Huang Bowen 24'

Melbourne Rectangular Stadium, Melbourne
Attendance: 10,041
Referee: Nawaf Shukralla (Bahrain)
23 April 2019
20:00 UTC+9

Daegu FC (South Korea)	0–1	(Japan) Sanfrecce Hiroshima
	Live Report; Stats Report	Araki 34'

DGB Daegu Bank Park, Daegu
Attendance: 10,074
Referee: Mohd Amirul Izwan Yaacob (Malaysia)

8 May 2019
19:00 UTC+9

Sanfrecce Hiroshima (Japan)	1–0	(China) Guangzhou Evergrande
Sasaki 15'	Live Report; Stats Report

Hiroshima Big Arch, Hiroshima
Attendance: 4,302
Referee: Alireza Faghani (Iran)
8 May 2019
19:00 UTC+9

Daegu FC (South Korea)	4–0	(Australia) Melbourne Victory
Edgar 9' (pen.); Jeong Tae-wook 53'; Kim Dae-won 80'; Jung Seon-ho 83'	Live Report; Stats Report

DGB Daegu Bank Park, Daegu
Attendance: 8,355
Referee: Abdulrahman Al-Jassim (Qatar)

22 May 2019
18:00 UTC+8

Guangzhou Evergrande (China)	1–0	(South Korea) Daegu FC
Jeong Tae-wook 64' (o.g.)	Live Report; Stats Report

Tianhe Stadium, Guangzhou
Attendance: 38,293
Referee: Mohammed Abdulla Hassan Mohamed (United Arab Emirates)
22 May 2019
20:00 UTC+10

Melbourne Victory (Australia)	1–3	(Japan) Sanfrecce Hiroshima
Toivonen 70'	Live Report; Stats Report	T. Matsumoto 5'; Minagawa 73'; Morishima 75'

Melbourne Rectangular Stadium, Melbourne
Attendance: 6,053
Referee: Turki Al-Khudhayr (Saudi Arabia)

=== Group G ===
Pos	Team	Pld	W	D	L	GF	GA	GD	Pts	Qualification	JEO	URA	BJG	BUR
1	(South Korea) Jeonbuk Hyundai Motors	6	4	1	1	7	3	+4	13	Advance to knockout stage	—	2–1	3–1	0–0
2	(Japan) Urawa Red Diamonds	6	3	1	2	9	4	+5	10	Advance to knockout stage	0–1	—	3–0	3–0
3	(China) Beijing FC	6	2	1	3	6	8	−2	7		0–1	0–0	—	2–0
4	(Thailand) Buriram United	6	1	1	4	3	10	−7	4		1–0	1–2	1–3	—

Source: AFC
Rules for classification: Group stage tiebreakers
6 March 2019
19:00 UTC+9

Jeonbuk Hyundai Motors (South Korea)	3–1	(China) Beijing FC
Han Kyo-won 14'; Lee Dong-gook 48'; Kim Shin-wook 71'	Live Report; Stats Report	Zhang Xizhe 41'

Jeonju World Cup Stadium, Jeonju
Attendance: 8,566
Referee: Aziz Asimov (Uzbekistan)
6 March 2019
19:30 UTC+9

Urawa Red Diamonds (Japan)	3–0	(Thailand) Buriram United
Makino 50'; Hashioka 75', 88'	Live Report; Stats Report

Saitama Stadium 2002, Saitama
Attendance: 20,056
Referee: Yaqoob Abdul Baki (Oman)

13 March 2019
18:00 UTC+7

Buriram United (Thailand)	1–0	(South Korea) Jeonbuk Hyundai Motors
Supachok 50'	Live Report; Stats Report

Buriram Stadium, Buriram
Attendance: 7,222
Referee: Ilgiz Tantashev (Uzbekistan)
13 March 2019
20:00 UTC+8

Beijing FC (China)	0–0	(Japan) Urawa Red Diamonds
	Live Report; Stats Report

Workers' Stadium, Beijing
Attendance: 43,112
Referee: Masoud Tufayelieh (Syria)

9 April 2019
19:30 UTC+9

Urawa Red Diamonds (Japan)	0–1	(South Korea) Jeonbuk Hyundai Motors
	Live Report; Stats Report	Adriano 77'

Saitama Stadium 2002, Saitama
Attendance: 20,118
Referee: Peter Green (Australia)
9 April 2019
18:00 UTC+7

Buriram United (Thailand)	1–3	(China) Beijing FC
Suphanat 80'	Live Report; Stats Report	Bakambu 2', 29', 54'

Buriram Stadium, Buriram
Attendance: 9,345
Referee: Hettikamkanamge Perera (Sri Lanka)

24 April 2019
19:00 UTC+9

Jeonbuk Hyundai Motors (South Korea)	2–1	(Japan) Urawa Red Diamonds
Lopes 12'; Kim Shin-wook 48'	Live Report; Stats Report	Koroki 58'

Jeonju World Cup Stadium, Jeonju
Attendance: 8,096
Referee: Mohammed Abdulla Hassan Mohamed (United Arab Emirates)
24 April 2019
20:00 UTC+8

Beijing FC (China)	2–0	(Thailand) Buriram United
Augusto 55' (pen.); Ba Dun 76'	Live Report; Stats Report

Workers' Stadium, Beijing
Attendance: 25,720
Referee: Khamis Al-Kuwari (Qatar)

7 May 2019
18:00 UTC+7

Buriram United (Thailand)	1–2	(Japan) Urawa Red Diamonds
Pedro 13'	Live Report; Stats Report	Koroki 3'; Muto 23'

Buriram Stadium, Buriram
Attendance: 10,970
Referee: Ilgiz Tantashev (Uzbekistan)
7 May 2019
20:00 UTC+8

Beijing FC (China)	0–1	(South Korea) Jeonbuk Hyundai Motors
	Live Report; Stats Report	Kim Shin-wook 17'

Workers' Stadium, Beijing
Attendance: 40,555
Referee: Ammar Al-Jeneibi (United Arab Emirates)

21 May 2019
19:00 UTC+9

Urawa Red Diamonds (Japan)	3–0	(China) Beijing FC
Nagasawa 34'; Muto 41'; Koroki 81'	Live Report; Stats Report

Saitama Stadium 2002, Saitama
Attendance: 22,885
Referee: Ali Sabah (Iraq)
21 May 2019
19:00 UTC+9

Jeonbuk Hyundai Motors (South Korea)	0–0	(Thailand) Buriram United
	Live Report; Stats Report

Jeonju World Cup Stadium, Jeonju
Attendance: 7,957
Referee: Abdulrahman Al-Jassim (Qatar)

=== Group H ===
Pos	Team	Pld	W	D	L	GF	GA	GD	Pts	Qualification	ULS	SSI	KAW	SYD
1	(South Korea) Ulsan Hyundai	6	3	2	1	5	7	−2	11	Advance to knockout stage	—	1–0	1–0	1–0
2	(China) Shanghai SIPG	6	2	3	1	13	8	+5	9	Advance to knockout stage	5–0	—	1–0	2–2
3	(Japan) Kawasaki Frontale	6	2	2	2	9	6	+3	8		2–2	2–2	—	1–0
4	(Australia) Sydney FC	6	0	3	3	5	11	−6	3		0–0	3–3	0–4	—

Source: AFC
Rules for classification: Group stage tiebreakers
6 March 2019
20:00 UTC+11

Sydney FC (Australia)	0–0	(South Korea) Ulsan Hyundai
	Live Report; Stats Report

Jubilee Oval, Sydney
Attendance: 4,039
Referee: Khamis Al-Kuwari (Qatar)
6 March 2019
19:30 UTC+8

Shanghai SIPG (China)	1–0	(Japan) Kawasaki Frontale
Hulk 89' (pen.)	Live Report; Stats Report

Shanghai Stadium, Shanghai
Attendance: 22,777
Referee: Mohammed Abdulla Hassan Mohamed (United Arab Emirates)

13 March 2019
19:00 UTC+9

Ulsan Hyundai (South Korea)	1–0	(China) Shanghai SIPG
Júnior 66'	Live Report; Stats Report

Ulsan Munsu Football Stadium, Ulsan
Attendance: 4,265
Referee: Ahmad Yacoub Ibrahim (Jordan)
13 March 2019
19:00 UTC+9

Kawasaki Frontale (Japan)	1–0	(Australia) Sydney FC
Saitō 83'	Live Report; Stats Report

Todoroki Athletics Stadium, Kawasaki
Attendance: 11,278
Referee: Valentin Kovalenko (Uzbekistan)

10 April 2019
19:30 UTC+10

Sydney FC (Australia)	3–3	(China) Shanghai SIPG
De Jong 3'; Le Fondre 32' (pen.); Brosque 84'	Live Report; Stats Report	Lü Wenjun 27'; Yu Hai 36'; Elkeson 89'

Jubilee Oval, Sydney
Attendance: 7,154
Referee: Alireza Faghani (Iran)
10 April 2019
20:00 UTC+9

Ulsan Hyundai (South Korea)	1–0	(Japan) Kawasaki Frontale
Kim Su-an 90+1'	Live Report; Stats Report

Ulsan Munsu Football Stadium, Ulsan
Attendance: 2,688
Referee: Turki Al-Khudhayr (Saudi Arabia)

23 April 2019
19:00 UTC+9

Kawasaki Frontale (Japan)	2–2	(South Korea) Ulsan Hyundai
Kobayashi 8'; Chinen 82'	Live Report; Stats Report	Park Yong-woo 17'; Júnior 31'

Todoroki Athletics Stadium, Kawasaki
Attendance: 9,812
Referee: Ammar Al-Jeneibi (United Arab Emirates)
23 April 2019
19:30 UTC+8

Shanghai SIPG (China)	2–2	(Australia) Sydney FC
Elkeson 47'; Wang Shenchao 59'	Live Report; Stats Report	O'Neill 33'; Le Fondre 62'

Shanghai Stadium, Shanghai
Attendance: 21,989
Referee: Abdulrahman Al-Jassim (Qatar)

7 May 2019
19:00 UTC+9

Ulsan Hyundai (South Korea)	1–0	(Australia) Sydney FC
Diskerud 59'	Live Report; Stats Report

Ulsan Munsu Football Stadium, Ulsan
Attendance: 1,520
Referee: Ali Sabah (Iraq)
7 May 2019
19:00 UTC+9

Kawasaki Frontale (Japan)	2–2	(China) Shanghai SIPG
Damião 13'; Taniguchi 66'	Live Report; Stats Report	Hulk 6', 71'

Todoroki Athletics Stadium, Kawasaki
Attendance: 11,708
Referee: Ravshan Irmatov (Uzbekistan)

21 May 2019
20:00 UTC+10

Sydney FC (Australia)	0–4	(Japan) Kawasaki Frontale
	Live Report; Stats Report	Wakizaka 9', 20'; Tanaka 28'; Damião 59'

Jubilee Oval, Sydney
Attendance: 3,813
Referee: Mohanad Qasim (Iraq)
21 May 2019
18:00 UTC+8

Shanghai SIPG (China)	5–0	(South Korea) Ulsan Hyundai
Oscar 7', 42', 76'; Li Shenglong 67'; Hu Jinghang 88'	Live Report; Stats Report

Shanghai Stadium, Shanghai
Attendance: 22,763
Referee: Aziz Asimov (Uzbekistan)
