= 2019 AFC Champions League knockout stage =

Football tournament knockout stage

The 2019 AFC Champions League knockout stage was played from 18 June to 24 November 2019. A total of 16 teams competed in the knockout stage to decide the champions of the 2019 AFC Champions League.

== Qualified teams ==
The winners and runners-up of each of the eight groups in the group stage advanced to the round of 16, with both West Region (Groups A–D) and East Region (Groups E–H) having eight qualified teams.

Region	Group	Winners	Runners-up
West Region	A	(Iran) Zob Ahan	(Saudi Arabia) Al-Nassr
West Region	B	(United Arab Emirates) Al-Wahda	(Saudi Arabia) Al-Ittihad
West Region	C	(Saudi Arabia) Al-Hilal	(Qatar) Al-Duhail
West Region	D	(Qatar) Al-Sadd	(Saudi Arabia) Al-Ahli
East Region	E	(China) Shandong Luneng	(Japan) Kashima Antlers
East Region	F	(Japan) Sanfrecce Hiroshima	(China) Guangzhou Evergrande
East Region	G	(South Korea) Jeonbuk Hyundai Motors	(Japan) Urawa Red Diamonds
East Region	H	(South Korea) Ulsan Hyundai	(China) Shanghai SIPG

== Format ==
In the knockout stage, the 16 teams played a single-elimination tournament, with the teams split into the two regions until the final. Each tie is played on a home-and-away two-legged basis. The away goals rule, extra time (away goals do not apply in extra time) and penalty shoot-out were used to decide the winner if necessary (Regulations Article 11.3).

== Schedule ==
The schedule of each round was as follows. Up to the semi-finals, matches in the West Region were played on Mondays and Tuesdays, while matches in the East Region were played on Tuesdays and Wednesdays.

Round	First leg	Second leg
Round of 16	18–19 June 2019 (E), 5–6 August 2019 (W)	25–26 June 2019 (E), 12–13 August 2019 (W)
Quarter-finals	26–28 August 2019	16–18 September 2019
Semi-finals	1–2 October 2019	22–23 October 2019
Final	9 November 2019	24 November 2019

== Bracket ==
The bracket of the knockout stage was determined as follows:

Round	Matchups
Round of 16	(Group winners host second leg) West Region: Group A runners-up vs. Group B winners; Group B runners-up vs. Group A winners; Group C runners-up vs. Group D winners; Group D runners-up vs. Group C winners; East Region: Group E runners-up vs. Group F winners; Group F runners-up vs. Group E winners; Group G runners-up vs. Group H winners; Group H runners-up vs. Group G winners
Quarter-finals	(Matchups and order of legs decided by draw, involving four round of 16 winners each in West Region and East Region) West Region: QF1; QF2; East Region: QF3; QF4
Semi-finals	(Winners of QF1 and QF3 host first leg, winners of QF2 and QF4 host second leg) West Region: SF1: Winners of QF1 vs. Winners of QF2; East Region: SF2: Winners of QF3 vs. Winners of QF4
Final	(Winners of SF1 host first leg, winners of SF2 host second leg, as reversed from previous season's final): Winners of SF1 vs. Winners of SF2

The bracket was decided after the draw for the quarter-finals, which was held on 2 July 2019, 16:00 MYT (UTC+8), at the AFC House in Kuala Lumpur, Malaysia.

Round of 16	Quarter-finals
(Saudi Arabia) Al-Nassr	1	3	4
(United Arab Emirates) Al-Wahda	1	2	3
(Saudi Arabia) Al-Nassr	2	1	3
(Qatar) Al-Sadd	1	3	4
(Qatar) Al-Duhail	1	1	2
(Qatar) Al-Sadd	1	3	4
West Region
(Saudi Arabia) Al-Ittihad	2	4	6
(Iran) Zob Ahan	1	3	4
(Saudi Arabia) Al-Ittihad	0	1	1
(Saudi Arabia) Al-Hilal	0	3	3
(Saudi Arabia) Al-Ahli	2	1	3
(Saudi Arabia) Al-Hilal	4	0	4
(China) Shanghai SIPG (p)	1	1	2 (5)
(South Korea) Jeonbuk Hyundai Motors	1	1	2 (3)
(China) Shanghai SIPG	2	1	3
(Japan) Urawa Red Diamonds (a)	2	1	3
(Japan) Urawa Red Diamonds	1	3	4
(South Korea) Ulsan Hyundai	2	0	2
East Region
(China) Guangzhou Evergrande (p)	2	2	4 (6)
(China) Shandong Luneng	1	3	4 (5)
(China) Guangzhou Evergrande (a)	0	1	1
(Japan) Kashima Antlers	0	1	1
(Japan) Kashima Antlers (a)	1	2	3
(Japan) Sanfrecce Hiroshima	0	3	3

Semi-finals
(Qatar) Al-Sadd	1	4	5
(Saudi Arabia) Al-Hilal	4	2	6
(Japan) Urawa Red Diamonds	2	1	3
(China) Guangzhou Evergrande	0	0	0

Final
(Saudi Arabia) Al-Hilal	1	2	3
(Japan) Urawa Red Diamonds	0	0	0

== Round of 16 ==
=== Summary ===
In the round of 16, the winners of one group played the runners-up of another group from the same region, with the group winners hosting the second leg, and the matchups determined by the group stage draw.

West Region
Team 1	Agg.	Team 2	1st leg	2nd leg
Al-Nassr (Saudi Arabia)	4–3	(United Arab Emirates) Al-Wahda	1–1	3–2
Al-Ittihad (Saudi Arabia)	6–4	(Iran) Zob Ahan	2–1	4–3
Al-Duhail (Qatar)	2–4	(Qatar) Al-Sadd	1–1	1–3
Al-Ahli (Saudi Arabia)	3–4	(Saudi Arabia) Al-Hilal	2–4	1–0

East Region
Team 1	Agg.	Team 2	1st leg	2nd leg
Kashima Antlers (Japan)	3–3 (a)	(Japan) Sanfrecce Hiroshima	1–0	2–3
Guangzhou Evergrande (China)	4–4 (6–5 p)	(China) Shandong Luneng	2–1	2–3 (a.e.t.)
Urawa Red Diamonds (Japan)	4–2	(South Korea) Ulsan Hyundai	1–2	3–0
Shanghai SIPG (China)	2–2 (5–3 p)	(South Korea) Jeonbuk Hyundai Motors	1–1	1–1 (a.e.t.)

=== West Region ===
5 August 2019
21:00 UTC+3

Al-Nassr (Saudi Arabia)	1–1	(United Arab Emirates) Al-Wahda
Hamdallah 17'	Live Report; Stats Report	Leonardo 53'

King Fahd International Stadium, Riyadh
Attendance: 8,617
Referee: Ali Sabah (Iraq)
12 August 2019
19:40 UTC+4

Al-Wahda (United Arab Emirates)	2–3	(Saudi Arabia) Al-Nassr
Al-Menhali 27'; Tagliabúe 79'	Live Report; Stats Report	Hamdallah 41'; Giuliano 45+1', 62'

Al Nahyan Stadium, Abu Dhabi
Attendance: 5,742
Referee: Muhammad Taqi (Singapore)

Al-Nassr won 4–3 on aggregate.

5 August 2019
20:00 UTC+4

Al-Ittihad (Saudi Arabia)	2–1	(Iran) Zob Ahan
Jiménez 9'; Al-Sahafi 72'	Live Report; Stats Report	Haddadifar 7'

Zabeel Stadium, Dubai (United Arab Emirates) (Note: Matches between teams from Iran and Saudi Arabia were played on neutral venues due to deterioration of Iran–Saudi Arabia relations.)
Attendance: 2,380
Referee: Ma Ning (China)
12 August 2019
22:00 UTC+3

Zob Ahan (Iran)	3–4	(Saudi Arabia) Al-Ittihad
Jiménez 53' (o.g.); Mohammadi 72'; Chrisantus 83'	Live Report; Stats Report	Vecchio 45+1'; Sadeghi 54' (o.g.); Romarinho 64', 70'

Grand Hamad Stadium, Doha (Qatar)
Attendance: 700
Referee: Adham Makhadmeh (Jordan)

Al-Ittihad won 6–4 on aggregate.

6 August 2019
19:00 UTC+3

Al-Duhail (Qatar)	1–1	(Qatar) Al-Sadd
Msakni 44'	Live Report; Stats Report	Afif 30'

Al Janoub Stadium, Al Wakrah
Attendance: 9,548
Referee: Ryuji Sato (Japan)
13 August 2019
19:15 UTC+3

Al-Sadd (Qatar)	3–1	(Qatar) Al-Duhail
Afif 20'; Hassan 34'; Yasser 90+1' (o.g.)	Live Report; Stats Report	Edmilson 56'

Jassim bin Hamad Stadium, Al Rayyan
Attendance: 9,930
Referee: Chris Beath (Australia)

Al-Sadd won 4–2 on aggregate.

6 August 2019
19:40 UTC+3

Al-Ahli (Saudi Arabia)	2–4	(Saudi Arabia) Al-Hilal
Al Somah 6'; Djaniny 39'	Live Report; Stats Report	Gomis 15', 48', 65'; Al-Hafith 81'

King Abdullah Sports City, Jeddah
Attendance: 48,094
Referee: Ahmed Al-Kaf (Oman)
13 August 2019
20:30 UTC+3

Al-Hilal (Saudi Arabia)	0–1	(Saudi Arabia) Al-Ahli
	Live Report; Stats Report	Asiri 42'

King Saud University Stadium, Riyadh
Attendance: 22,706
Referee: Ma Ning (China)

Al-Hilal won 4–3 on aggregate.

=== East Region ===
18 June 2019
19:00 UTC+9

Kashima Antlers (Japan)	1–0	(Japan) Sanfrecce Hiroshima
Serginho 24'	Live Report; Stats Report

Kashima Soccer Stadium, Kashima
Attendance: 13,179
Referee: Aziz Asimov (Uzbekistan)
25 June 2019
19:00 UTC+9

Sanfrecce Hiroshima (Japan)	3–2	(Japan) Kashima Antlers
Patric 66', 90+6' (pen.); Sasaki 72'	Live Report; Stats Report	Doi 33', 89'

Hiroshima Big Arch, Hiroshima
Attendance: 4,279
Referee: Ali Sabah (Iraq)

3–3 on aggregate. Kashima Antlers won on away goals.

18 June 2019
20:00 UTC+8

Guangzhou Evergrande (China)	2–1	(China) Shandong Luneng
Wei Shihao 35'; Zheng Zheng 80' (o.g.)	Live Report; Stats Report	Zhang Chi 66'

Tianhe Stadium, Guangzhou
Attendance: 38,900
Referee: Hettikamkanamge Perera (Sri Lanka)
25 June 2019
19:30 UTC+8

Shandong Luneng (China)	3–2 (a.e.t.)	(China) Guangzhou Evergrande
Zhou Haibin 62'; Fellaini 70'; Liu Junshuai 93'	Live Report; Stats Report	Paulinho 13', 103'
Penalties
Jin Jingdao (penalty scored); Gil (penalty scored); Fellaini (penalty scored); Hao Junmin (penalty scored); Zhou Haibin (penalty scored); Cui Peng (penalty missed)	5–6	(penalty scored) Wei Shihao; (penalty scored) Gao Lin; (penalty scored) Yang Liyu; (penalty scored) Paulinho; (penalty scored) Zhang Linpeng; (penalty scored) Zhong Yihao

Jinan Olympic Sports Center Stadium, Jinan
Attendance: 35,148
Referee: Valentin Kovalenko (Uzbekistan)

4–4 on aggregate. Guangzhou Evergrande won 6–5 on penalties.

19 June 2019
19:30 UTC+9

Urawa Red Diamonds (Japan)	1–2	(South Korea) Ulsan Hyundai
Sugimoto 37'	Live Report; Stats Report	Joo Min-kyu 42'; Hwang Il-su 80'

Saitama Stadium 2002, Saitama
Attendance: 20,741
Referee: Turki Al-Khudhayr (Saudi Arabia)
26 June 2019
20:00 UTC+9

Ulsan Hyundai (South Korea)	0–3	(Japan) Urawa Red Diamonds
	Live Report; Stats Report	Koroki 41', 80'; Ewerton 87'

Ulsan Munsu Football Stadium, Ulsan
Attendance: 3,140
Referee: Khamis Al-Kuwari (Qatar)

Urawa Red Diamonds won 4–2 on aggregate.

19 June 2019
20:00 UTC+8

Shanghai SIPG (China)	1–1	(South Korea) Jeonbuk Hyundai Motors
Wang Shenchao 39'	Live Report; Stats Report	Moon Seon-min 1'

Shanghai Stadium, Shanghai
Attendance: 20,007
Referee: Nawaf Shukralla (Bahrain)
26 June 2019
19:00 UTC+9

Jeonbuk Hyundai Motors (South Korea)	1–1 (a.e.t.)	(China) Shanghai SIPG
Kim Shin-wook 27'	Live Report; Stats Report	Hulk 80'
Penalties
Lee Dong-gook (penalty missed); Kim Shin-wook (penalty scored); Lee Yong (penalty scored); Shin Hyung-min (penalty scored)	3–5	(penalty scored) Hulk; (penalty scored) Elkeson; (penalty scored) Ahmedov; (penalty scored) Wang Shenchao; (penalty scored) Oscar

Jeonju World Cup Stadium, Jeonju
Attendance: 11,095
Referee: Alireza Faghani (Iran)

2–2 on aggregate. Shanghai SIPG won 5–3 on penalties.

== Quarter-finals ==
=== Summary ===
The draw for the quarter-finals was held on 2 July 2019. In the quarter-finals, the four round of 16 winners from the West Region (whose identity was not known at the time of the draw) played in two ties, and the four round of 16 winners from the East Region played in two ties, with the matchups and order of legs decided by draw, without any seeding or country protection.

West Region
Team 1	Agg.	Team 2	1st leg	2nd leg
Al-Nassr (Saudi Arabia)	3–4	(Qatar) Al-Sadd	2–1	1–3
Al-Ittihad (Saudi Arabia)	1–3	(Saudi Arabia) Al-Hilal	0–0	1–3

East Region
Team 1	Agg.	Team 2	1st leg	2nd leg
Shanghai SIPG (China)	3–3 (a)	(Japan) Urawa Red Diamonds	2–2	1–1
Guangzhou Evergrande (China)	1–1 (a)	(Japan) Kashima Antlers	0–0	1–1

=== West Region ===
26 August 2019
20:45 UTC+3

Al-Nassr (Saudi Arabia)	2–1	(Qatar) Al-Sadd
Al-Dossari 44'; Giuliano 72'	Live Report; Stats Report	Asad 21'

King Fahd International Stadium, Riyadh
Attendance: 16,911
Referee: Valentin Kovalenko (Uzbekistan)
16 September 2019
18:45 UTC+3

Al-Sadd (Qatar)	3–1	(Saudi Arabia) Al-Nassr
Afif 26'; Al-Haydos 59'; Bounedjah 83' (pen.)	Live Report; Stats Report	Hamdallah 33'

Jassim bin Hamad Stadium, Al Rayyan
Attendance: 13,262
Referee: Hettikamkanamge Perera (Sri Lanka)

Al-Sadd won 4–3 on aggregate.

27 August 2019
20:45 UTC+3

Al-Ittihad (Saudi Arabia)	0–0	(Saudi Arabia) Al-Hilal
	Live Report; Stats Report

King Abdullah Sports City, Jeddah
Attendance: 54,390
Referee: Chris Beath (Australia)
17 September 2019
20:00 UTC+3

Al-Hilal (Saudi Arabia)	3–1	(Saudi Arabia) Al-Ittihad
Carrillo 44'; S. Al-Dawsari 48'; Giovinco 78'	Live Report; Stats Report	Al-Sahafi 10'

King Saud University Stadium, Riyadh
Attendance: 22,916
Referee: Ryuji Sato (Japan)

Al-Hilal won 3–1 on aggregate.

=== East Region ===
27 August 2019
19:30 UTC+8

Shanghai SIPG (China)	2–2	(Japan) Urawa Red Diamonds
Hulk 49' (pen.), 71' (pen.)	Live Report; Stats Report	Makino 3'; Koroki 30'

Shanghai Stadium, Shanghai
Attendance: 24,573
Referee: Mohammed Abdulla Hassan Mohamed (United Arab Emirates)
17 September 2019
19:30 UTC+9

Urawa Red Diamonds (Japan)	1–1	(China) Shanghai SIPG
Koroki 39'	Live Report; Stats Report	Wang Shenchao 60'

Saitama Stadium 2002, Saitama
Attendance: 28,533
Referee: Mohanad Qassim (Iraq)

3–3 on aggregate. Urawa Red Diamonds won on away goals.

28 August 2019
20:00 UTC+8

Guangzhou Evergrande (China)	0–0	(Japan) Kashima Antlers
	Live Report; Stats Report

Tianhe Stadium, Guangzhou
Attendance: 39,998
Referee: Abdulrahman Al-Jassim (Qatar)
18 September 2019
19:00 UTC+9

Kashima Antlers (Japan)	1–1	(China) Guangzhou Evergrande
Serginho 51'	Live Report; Stats Report	Talisca 40'

Kashima Soccer Stadium, Kashima
Attendance: 13,835
Referee: Ahmed Al-Kaf (Oman)

1–1 on aggregate. Guangzhou Evergrande won on away goals.

== Semi-finals ==
=== Summary ===
In the semi-finals, the two quarter-final winners from the West Region played each other, and the two quarter-final winners from the East Region played each other, with the order of legs determined by the quarter-final draw.

West Region
Team 1	Agg.	Team 2	1st leg	2nd leg
Al-Sadd (Qatar)	5–6	(Saudi Arabia) Al-Hilal	1–4	4–2

East Region
Team 1	Agg.	Team 2	1st leg	2nd leg
Urawa Red Diamonds (Japan)	3–0	(China) Guangzhou Evergrande	2–0	1–0

=== West Region ===
1 October 2019
18:30 UTC+3

Al-Sadd (Qatar)	1–4	(Saudi Arabia) Al-Hilal
Gomis 14' (o.g.)	Live Report; Stats Report	Gomis 33', 60'; Al-Bulaihi 45'; Al-Shalhoub 67'

Jassim bin Hamad Stadium, Al Rayyan
Attendance: 13,753
Referee: Ahmed Al-Kaf (Oman)
22 October 2019
19:15 UTC+3

Al-Hilal (Saudi Arabia)	2–4	(Qatar) Al-Sadd
S. Al-Dawsari 13'; Gomis 25'	Live Report; Stats Report	Afif 17' (pen.); Nam Tae-hee 19'; Al-Haydos 20'; Khoukhi 90+3'

King Saud University Stadium, Riyadh
Attendance: 20,743
Referee: Muhammad Taqi (Singapore)

Al-Hilal won 6–5 on aggregate.

=== East Region ===
2 October 2019
19:30 UTC+9

Urawa Red Diamonds (Japan)	2–0	(China) Guangzhou Evergrande
Fabrício 19'; Sekine 75'	Live Report; Stats Report

Saitama Stadium 2002, Saitama
Attendance: 30,068
Referee: Chris Beath (Australia)
23 October 2019
20:00 UTC+8

Guangzhou Evergrande (China)	0–1	(Japan) Urawa Red Diamonds
	Live Report; Stats Report	Koroki 50'

Tianhe Stadium, Guangzhou
Attendance: 39,999
Referee: Alireza Faghani (Iran)

Urawa Red Diamonds won 3–0 on aggregate.

== Final ==
In the final, the two semi-final winners played each other, with the order of legs (first leg hosted by team from the West Region, second leg hosted by team from the East Region) reversed from the previous season's final.

9 November 2019
19:30 UTC+3

Al-Hilal (Saudi Arabia)	1–0	(Japan) Urawa Red Diamonds
Carrillo 60'	Live Report; Stats Report

King Saud University Stadium, Riyadh
Attendance: 22,549
Referee: Ali Sabah (Iraq)
24 November 2019
19:01 UTC+9

Urawa Red Diamonds (Japan)	0–2	(Saudi Arabia) Al-Hilal
	Live Report; Stats Report	Al-Dawsari 74'; Gomis 90+3'

Saitama Stadium 2002, Saitama
Attendance: 58,109
Referee: Valentin Kovalenko (Uzbekistan)

Al-Hilal won 3–0 on aggregate.
