= Kim Su-an (footballer) =

South Korean footballer (born 1993)

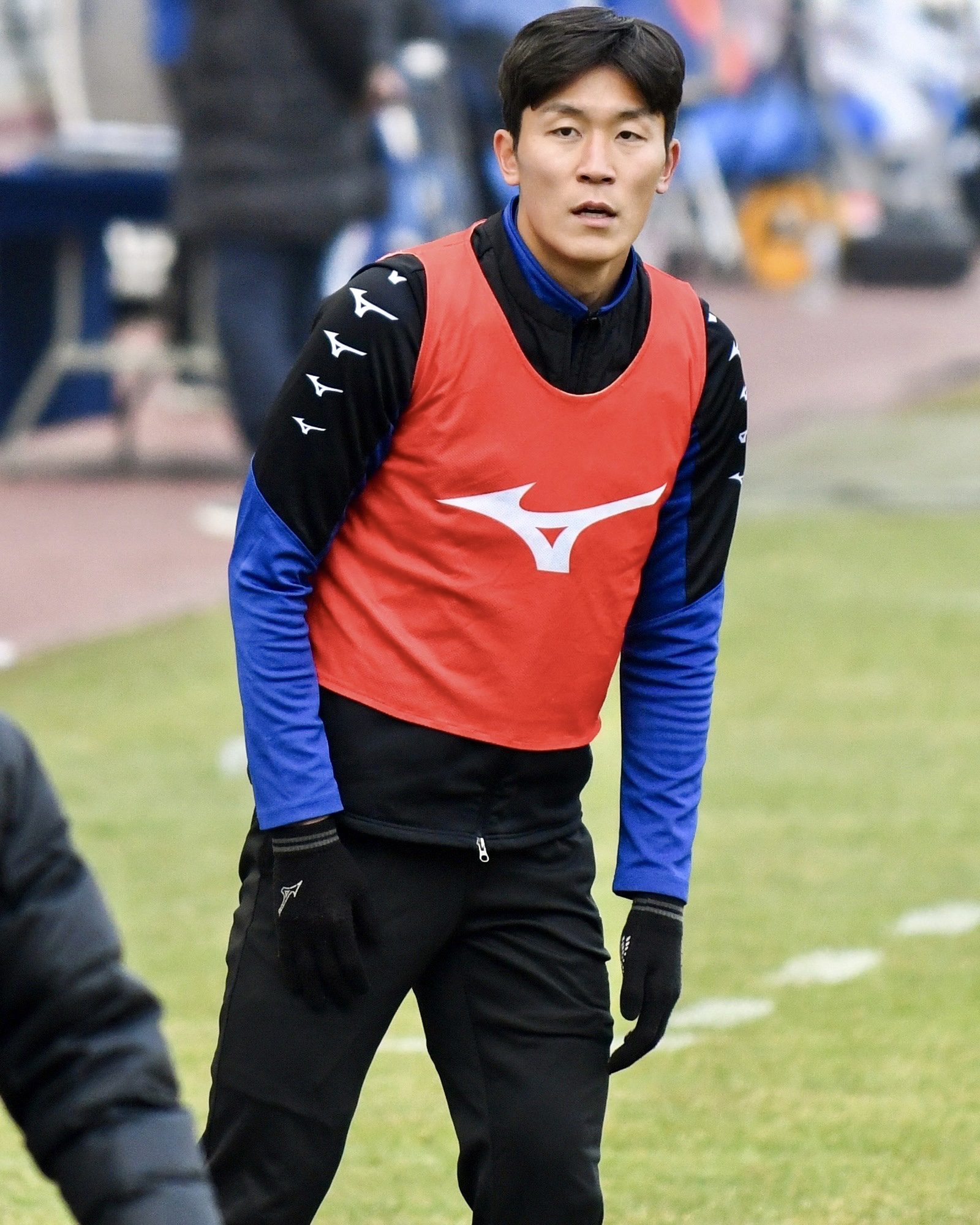
- Kim in 2024

Personal information
- Date of birth: 10 June 1993 (age 33)
- Place of birth: South Korea
- Height: 1.92 m (6 ft 3 1/2 in)
- Positions: Centre-back; striker

Team information
- Current team: Pocheon Citizen
- Number: 29

Youth career
- 2012–2013: Konkuk University

Senior career*
| Years | Team | Apps | (Gls) |
| 2014–2019 | Ulsan Hyundai | 22 | (1) |
| 2014 | → Ulsan Hyundai Mipo (loan) | 15 | (1) |
| 2015 | → Gangwon (loan) | 15 | (0) |
| 2016 | → Chungju Hummel (loan) | 7 | (0) |
| 2020–2023 | Seoul E-Land | 25 | (0) |
| 2021 | → Pocheon Citizen (loan) | 27 | (10) |
| 2022–2023 | → Goyang KH (loan) | 1 | (0) |
| 2024–2025 | Chungnam Asan | 5 | (0) |
| 2026– | Pocheon Citizen | 2 | (0) |
- * Club domestic league appearances and goals as of 19 March 2026

Kim Su-an (Korean: 김수안; born 10 June 1993) is a South Korean footballer who plays as striker or centre-back for K3 League club Pocheon Citizen.

== Career ==
Kim joined K League 1 side Ulsan Hyundai before 2014 season starts.

On 30 December 2023, he left Seoul E-Land FC as the contract expired.
