= Kusanagi Stadium =

Baseball stadium in Shizuoka, Japan

Coordinates: 34.990629°N 138.429065°E

Shizutetsu Stadium Kusanagi
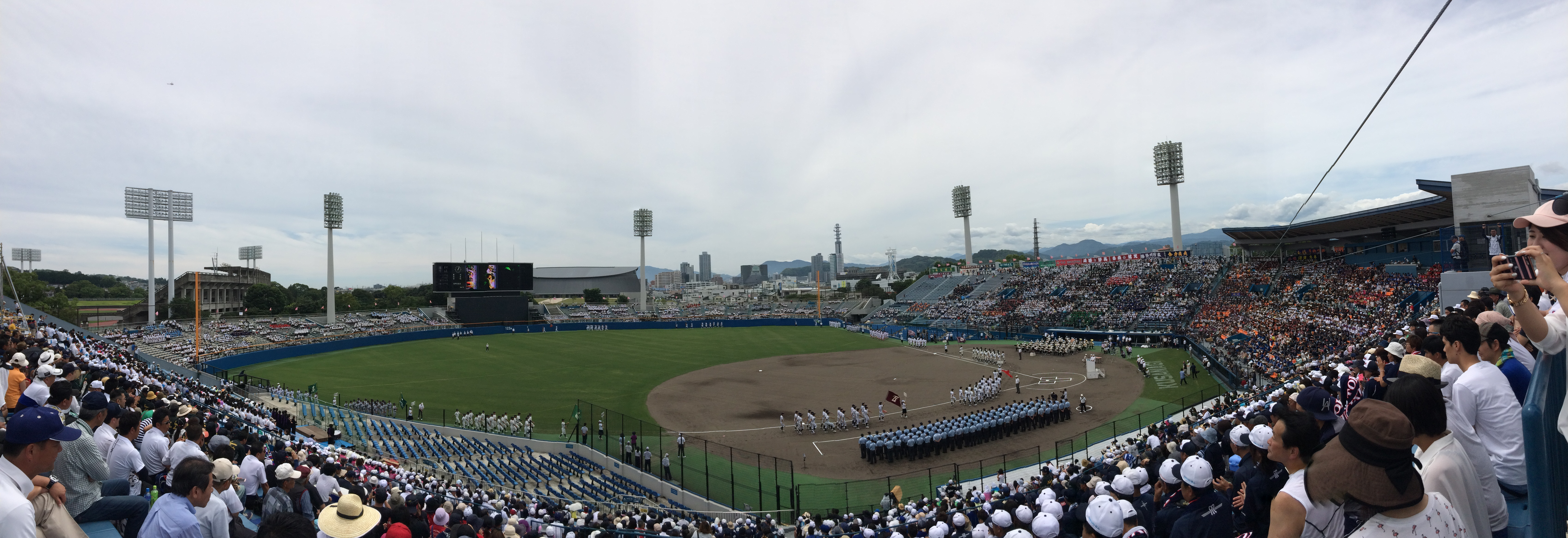
- Interactive map of Shizutetsu Stadium Kusanagi
- Location: Shizuoka, Japan
- Capacity: 21,656

Construction
- Opened: 1930

The Shizuoka Kusanagi Baseball Stadium, officially named Shizutetsu Stadium Kusanagi, is a multi-purpose stadium in Shizuoka, Japan. It is currently used mostly for baseball matches. The stadium was originally opened in 1930 and has a capacity of 21,656.
