= Ali Sabah =

Iraqi football referee (born 1977)

- Full name: Ali Sabah Adday Al-Qaysi
- Born: 1 January 1977 (age 49); Baghdad, Iraq

International
Years	League	Role
2009–	FIFA	Referee

Ali Sabah Adday Al-Qaysi (born 1 January 1977) is an Iraqi football referee who has been a full international referee for FIFA.

Sabah became a FIFA referee in 2002. He has served as a referee at competitions including the 2018 FIFA World Cup qualifiers, beginning with the preliminary-round match between Palestine and United Arab Emirates.

== AFC Asian Cup ==
2019 AFC Asian Cup
Date	Match	Venue	Round
12 January 2019	Lebanon 0–2 Saudi Arabia	Al Maktoum Stadium, Dubai	Group stage
