= Mohammed Al-Menhali =

Emirati footballer (born 1990)

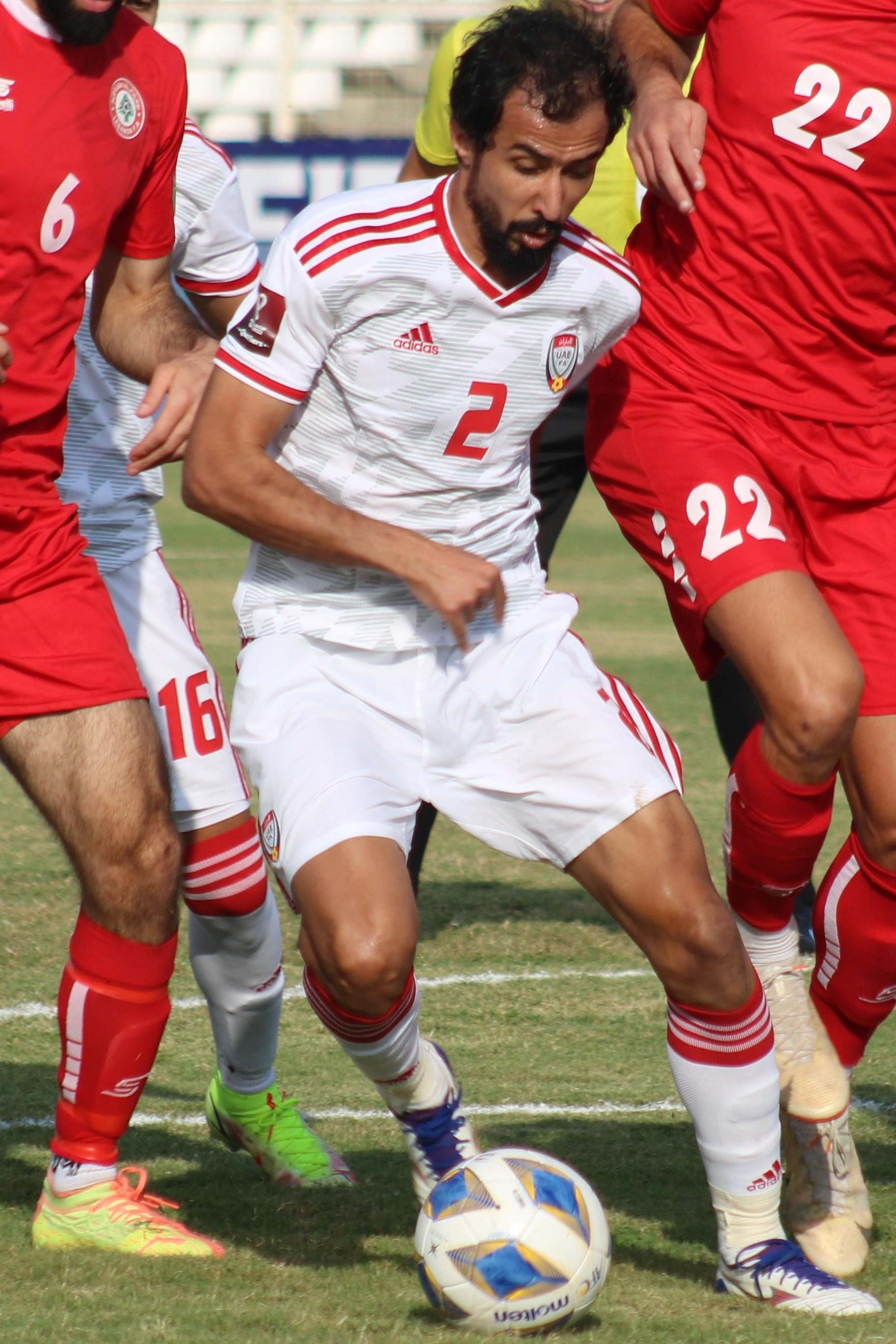
- Al-Menhali with the United Arab Emirates in 2021

Personal information
- Full name: Mohammed Saleh Barghash Jaralla Al-Menhali
- Date of birth: 27 October 1990 (age 36)
- Place of birth: United Arab Emirates
- Height: 1.80 m (5 ft 11 in)
- Position: Full back

Youth career
- Al Jazira

Senior career*
Years	Team	Apps	(Gls)
2010–2013	Al Jazira	6	(0)
2013–2014	Baniyas	11	(0)
2014–2023	Al-Wahda	123	(4)
2023–2024	Al-Nasr	13	(0)

International career
2019–	United Arab Emirates	1	(0)
- * Club domestic league appearances and goals

Mohammed Saleh Barghash Jaralla Al-Menhali (Arabic: محمد صالح برغش جار الله المنهالي; born 27 October 1990) is an Emirati association football player who plays as a right back.
