= Australia men's national soccer team results (2020–present) =

This is a list of the Australia men's national soccer team results from 2020 to the present.

== 2020s ==
Win Draw Loss Fixtures

=== 2020 ===
No matches were played due to the COVID-19 pandemic.

=== 2021 ===
3 June 2022 WCQ / 2023 ACQ	Australia	3–0	Kuwait	Kuwait City, Kuwait
21:30 UTC+3	Leckie 1'; Irvine 24'; Hrustic 66'	Report		Stadium: Jaber Al-Ahmad International Stadium; Attendance: 0 (Note: Due to the COVID-19 pandemic, the match was played behind closed doors.); Referee: Jumpei Iida (Japan)

7 June 2022 WCQ / 2023 ACQ	Australia	5–1	Chinese Taipei	Kuwait City, Kuwait
19:30 UTC+3	Souttar 12'; Maclaren 27' (pen.); Sainsbury 41'; Duke 46', 84'	Report	Gao Wei-jie 62'	Stadium: Jaber Al-Ahmad International Stadium; Attendance: 0 Referee: Saoud Al-Adba (Qatar)

11 June 2022 WCQ / 2023 ACQ	Nepal	0–3	Australia	Kuwait City, Kuwait
19:30 UTC+3		Report	Leckie 6'; Karacic 38'; Boyle 56'	Stadium: Jaber Al-Ahmad International Stadium; Attendance: 0{ Referee: Ahmed Al-Kaf (Oman)

15 June 2022 WCQ / 2023 ACQ	Australia	1–0	Jordan	Kuwait City, Kuwait
21:30 UTC+3	Souttar 77'	Report		Stadium: Jaber Al-Ahmad International Stadium; Attendance: 0 Referee: Kim Woo-Sung (South Korea)

2 September 2022 World Cup qualification	Australia	3–0	China	Doha, Qatar
21:00 UTC+3	Mabil 24'; Boyle 26'; Duke 70'	Report		Stadium: Khalifa International Stadium; Attendance: 0 Referee: Ko Hyung-jin (South Korea)

7 September 2022 World Cup qualification	Vietnam	0–1	Australia	Hanoi, Vietnam
19:00 UTC+7		Report	Grant 43'	Stadium: Mỹ Đình National Stadium; Attendance: 0 Referee: Abdulrahman Al-Jassim (Qatar)

7 October 2022 World Cup qualification	Australia	3–1	Oman	Doha, Qatar
21:30 UTC+3	Mabil 9'; Boyle 49'; Duke 89'	Report	Al-Alawi 28'	Stadium: Khalifa International Stadium; Attendance: 0 Referee: Nawaf Shukralla (Bahrain)

12 October 2022 World Cup qualification	Japan	2–1	Australia	Saitama, Japan
19:14 UTC+9	Tanaka 8'; Behich 85' (o.g.)	Report	Hrustic 69'	Stadium: Saitama Stadium 2002; Attendance: 14,437; Referee: Abdulrahman Al-Jassim (Qatar)

11 November 2022 World Cup qualification	Australia	0–0	Saudi Arabia	Sydney, Australia
20:10 UTC+11		Report		Stadium: Western Sydney Stadium; Attendance: 23,314; Referee: Ko Hyung-jin (South Korea)

16 November 2022 World Cup qualification	China	1–1	Australia	Sharjah, United Arab Emirates
19:00 UTC+4	Wu Lei 71' (pen.)	Report	Duke 38'	Stadium: Sharjah Stadium; Referee: Adham Makhadmeh (Jordan)

=== 2022 ===
27 January 2022 World Cup qualification	Australia	4–0	Vietnam	Melbourne, Australia
20:10 UTC+11	Maclaren 30'; Rogic 45+2'; Goodwin 72'; McGree 76'	Report		Stadium: Melbourne Rectangular Stadium; Attendance: 27,740; Referee: Ko Hyung-jin (South Korea)

1 February 2022 World Cup qualification	Oman	2–2	Australia	Muscat, Oman
20:00 UTC+4	Fawaz 54', 89' (pen.)	Report	Maclaren 15' (pen.); Mooy 79'	Stadium: Sultan Qaboos Sports Complex; Attendance: 0 Referee: Mohammed Abdulla Hassan Mohamed (United Arab Emirates)

24 March 2022 World Cup qualification	Australia	0–2	Japan	Sydney, Australia
20:10 UTC+11		Report	Mitoma 89', 90+4'	Stadium: Stadium Australia; Attendance: 41,852; Referee: Nawaf Shukralla (Bahrain)

29 March 2022 World Cup qualification	Saudi Arabia	1–0	Australia	Jeddah, Saudi Arabia
21:00 UTC+3	Al-Dawsari 65' (pen.)	Report		Stadium: King Abdullah Sports City; Referee: Adham Makhadmeh (Jordan)

1 June International Friendly	Australia	2–1	Jordan	Doha, Qatar
21:00 UTC+3	Wright 40'; Mabil 68'	Report	Al-Taamari 17'	Stadium: Al Janoub Stadium; Attendance: 0 (behind closed doors); Referee: Saad Kamil Al-Fadhli (Kuwait)

7 June 2022 World Cup qualification	United Arab Emirates	1–2	Australia	Al Rayyan, Qatar
21:00 UTC+3	Caio 57'	Report	Irvine 53'; Hrustic 84'	Stadium: Ahmad bin Ali Stadium; Attendance: 6,500; Referee: Ilgiz Tantashev (Uzbekistan)

13 June 2022 World Cup qualification	Australia	0–0 (a.e.t.) (5–4 p)	Peru	Al Rayyan, Qatar
21:00 UTC+3		Report		Stadium: Ahmad bin Ali Stadium; Attendance: 43,510; Referee: Slavko Vinčić (Slovenia)
	Penalties
	Boyle (penalty missed); Mooy (penalty scored); Goodwin (penalty scored); Hrustic (penalty scored); Maclaren (penalty scored); Mabil (penalty scored)		(penalty scored) Lapadula; (penalty scored) Callens; (penalty missed) Advíncula; (penalty scored) Tapia; (penalty scored) Flores; (penalty missed) Valera

22 September International Friendly	Australia	1–0	New Zealand	Brisbane, Australia
20:00 UTC+10	Mabil 35'	Report		Stadium: Suncorp Stadium; Attendance: 25,392; Referee: Ryuji Sato (Japan)

25 September International Friendly	New Zealand	0–2	Australia	Auckland, New Zealand
16:00 UTC+12		Report	Duke 54'; Cummings 80' (pen.)	Stadium: Eden Park; Attendance: 34,985; Referee: Yusuke Araki (Japan)

22 November 2022 FIFA World Cup Group D	France	4–1	Australia	Al Wakrah, Qatar
22:00 UTC+3	Rabiot 27'; Giroud 32', 71'; Mbappé 68'	Report	Goodwin 9'	Stadium: Al Janoub Stadium; Attendance: 41,232; Referee: Victor Gomes (South Africa)

26 November 2022 FIFA World Cup Group D	Tunisia	0–1	Australia	Al Wakrah, Qatar
13:00 UTC+3		Report	Duke 23'	Stadium: Al Janoub Stadium; Attendance: 41,823; Referee: Daniel Siebert (Germany)

30 November 2022 FIFA World Cup Group D	Australia	1–0	Denmark	Al Wakrah, Qatar
18:00 UTC+3	Leckie 60'	Report		Stadium: Al Janoub Stadium; Attendance: 41,232; Referee: Mustapha Ghorbal (Algeria)

3 December 2022 FIFA World Cup Round of 16	Argentina	2–1	Australia	Al Rayyan, Qatar
22:00 UTC+3	Messi 35'; Álvarez 57'	Report	Fernández 77' (o.g.)	Stadium: Ahmad bin Ali Stadium; Attendance: 45,032; Referee: Szymon Marciniak (Poland)

=== 2023 ===
24 March International Friendly	Australia	3–1	Ecuador	Sydney, Australia
20:00 AEDT	Irvine 12'; Mabil 32'; Kuol 84'	Report	Torres 23'	Stadium: Western Sydney Stadium; Attendance: 20,668; Referee: Kim Dae-Yong (South Korea)

28 March International Friendly	Australia	1–2	Ecuador	Melbourne, Australia
19:30 AEDT	Borrello 16'	Report	Estupiñán 51' (pen.); Pacho 65'	Stadium: Docklands Stadium; Attendance: 27,013; Referee: Chae Sang-Hyeop (Japan)

15 June International Friendly	Argentina	2–0	Australia	Beijing, China
20:00 UTC+8	Messi 2'; Pezzella 68'	Report		Stadium: Workers' Stadium; Attendance: 68,000; Referee: Ma Ning (China)

9 September International Friendly	Mexico	2–2	Australia	Arlington, United States
21:00 UTC–5	Jiménez 69' (pen.); Huerta 83'	Report	Souttar 16'; Boyle 63' (pen.)	Stadium: AT&T Stadium; Attendance: 52,787; Referee: Rubio Vázquez (United States)

13 October International Friendly	England	1–0	Australia	London, United Kingdom
19:45 UTC	Watkins 57'	Report		Stadium: Wembley Stadium; Attendance: 81,116; Referee: Stéphanie Frappart (France)

18 October 2023 Soccer Ashes series	Australia	2–0	New Zealand	London, United Kingdom
19:45	Souttar 13'; Irvine 76'	Report		Stadium: Gtech Community Stadium

16 November 2026 WCQ / 2027 ACQ	Australia	7–0	Bangladesh	Melbourne, Australia
20:00 UTC+11	Souttar 4'; Borrello 20'; Duke 37', 40'; Maclaren 48', 70', 84'	Report		Stadium: Melbourne Rectangular Stadium; Attendance: 20,876; Referee: Ahrol Risqullaev (Uzbekistan)

21 November 2026 World Cup Qualifiers Round 2	Palestine	0–1	Australia	Kuwait City, Kuwait (Note: Palestine played their home game at a neutral venue due to the ongoing Gaza war.)
17:00 UTC+3		Report	Souttar 18'	Stadium: Jaber Al-Ahmad International Stadium; Attendance: 14,537; Referee: Qasim Al-Hatmi (Oman)

=== 2024 ===
6 January Friendly	Bahrain	0–2	Australia	Abu Dhabi, United Arab Emirates
18:00 UTC+4		Report	Binaddi 36' (o.g.); Duke 61'	Stadium: Baniyas Stadium; Attendance: 300; Referee: Mohamed Al-Harmoodi (United Arab Emirates)

13 January 2023 AFC Asian Cup	Australia	2–0	India	Al Rayyan, Qatar
11:30 UTC+4	Irvine 50'; Bos 73'	Report		Stadium: Ahmad bin Ali Stadium; Attendance: 32,253; Referee: Yoshimi Yamashita (Japan)

18 January 2023 AFC Asian Cup	Syria	0–1	Australia	Al Rayyan, Qatar
11:30 UTC+4		Report	Irvine 59'	Stadium: Jassim bin Hamad Stadium; Attendance: 10,097; Referee: Adel Al Naqbi (UAE)

23 January 2023 AFC Asian Cup	Australia	1–1	Uzbekistan	Al Wakrah, Qatar
11:30 UTC+4	Boyle 45+1' (pen.)	Report	Turgunboev 78'	Stadium: Al Janoub Stadium; Referee: Yusuke Araki (Japan)

28 January 2023 AFC Asian Cup round of 16	Australia	4–0	Indonesia	Al Rayyan, Qatar
14:30 UTC+3	Baggott 12' (o.g.); Boyle 45'; Goodwin 89'; Souttar 90+1'	Report		Stadium: Jassim bin Hamad Stadium; Attendance: 7,863; Referee: Mohammed Abdulla Hassan Mohamed (United Arab Emirates)

2 February 2023 AFC Asian Cup quarter-finals	Australia	1–2 (a.e.t.)	South Korea	Al Wakrah, Qatar
18:30 UTC+3	Goodwin 42'	Report	H.C. Hwang 90+6' (pen.); Son 104'	Stadium: Al Janoub Stadium; Attendance: 39,632; Referee: Ahmed Al-Kaf (Oman)

21 March 2026 World Cup Qualifiers Round 2	Australia	2–0	Lebanon	Sydney, Australia
20:10 UTC+11	Baccus 5'; Rowles 54'	Report (FIFA); Report (AFC)		Stadium: Western Sydney Stadium; Attendance: 27,206; Referee: Khamis Al-Marri (Qatar)

26 March 2026 World Cup Qualifiers Round 2	Lebanon	0–5	Australia	Canberra, Australia (Note: Lebanon played this home match in Australia, following AFC approval, due to the ongoing Gaza war.)
19:45 UTC+11		Report	Yengi 2'; Jradi 47' (o.g.); Goodwin 48', 81'; Iredale 68'	Stadium: Canberra Stadium; Attendance: 25,023; Referee: Mooud Bonyadifard (Iran)

6 June 2026 World Cup Qualifiers Round 2	Bangladesh	0–2	Australia	Dhaka, Bangladesh
16:45 UTC+6		Report	Hrustic 29'; Yengi 62'	Stadium: Bashundhara Kings Arena; Attendance: 5,227; Referee: Jansen Foo (Singapore)

11 June 2026 World Cup Qualifiers Round 2	Australia	5–0	Palestine	Perth, Australia
22:05 UTC+11	Yengi 5' (pen.) 41'; Taggart 26'; Boyle 53'; Irankunda 87' (pen.)	Report		Stadium: Perth Rectangular Stadium; Attendance: 18,261; Referee: Khalid Al Turais (Saudi Arabia)

5 September 2026 World Cup Qualifiers Round 3	Australia	0–1	Bahrain	Gold Coast, Australia
20:10 UTC+10		Report	Souttar 89' (o.g.)	Stadium: Robina Stadium; Attendance: 24,644; Referee: Omar Al-Ali (United Arab Emirates)

10 September 2026 World Cup Qualifiers Round 3	Indonesia	0–0	Australia	Jakarta, Indonesia
19:00 UTC+7		Report		Stadium: Gelora Bung Karno Stadium; Attendance: 70,059; Referee: Salman Ahmad Falahi (Qatar)

10 October 2026 World Cup Qualifiers Round 3	Australia	3–1	China	Adelaide, Australia
19:40 UTC+10:30	Miller 45+2'; Goodwin 53'; Velupillay 90+2'	Report	Xie Wenneng 20'	Stadium: Adelaide Oval; Attendance: 46,291; Referee: Nazmi Nasaruddin (Malaysia)

15 October 2026 World Cup Qualifiers Round 3	Japan	1–1	Australia	Saitama, Japan
19:35 UTC+9	Burgess 76' (o.g.)	Report	Taniguchi 58' (o.g.)	Stadium: Saitama Stadium 2002; Referee: Ahmed Al-Ali (Kuwait)

14 November 2026 World Cup Qualifiers Round 3	Australia	0–0	Saudi Arabia	Melbourne, Australia
20:10 UTC+11		Report		Stadium: Melbourne Rectangular Stadium; Attendance: 27,491; Referee: Adel Ali Ahmed Khamis Al-Naqbi (United Arab Emirates)

19 November 2026 World Cup Qualifiers Round 3	Bahrain	2–2	Australia	Riffa, Bahrain
18:15 UTC+3	Abduljabbar 75', 77'	Report	Yengi 1', 90+6'	Stadium: Bahrain National Stadium; Attendance: 6,873; Referee: Ko Hyung-jin (South Korea)

=== 2025 ===
20 March 2026 World Cup Qualifiers Round 3	Australia	5–1	Indonesia	Sydney, Australia
20:10 UTC+11	Boyle 18' (pen.); Velupillay 20'; Irvine 34', 90'; Miller 61'	Report	Romeny 78'	Stadium: Sydney Football Stadium; Attendance: 35,241; Referee: Adham Makhadmeh (Jordan)

25 March 2026 World Cup Qualifiers Round 3	China	0–2	Australia	Hangzhou, China
19:00 UTC+8		Report	Irvine 16'; Velupillay 29'	Stadium: Hangzhou Olympic Sports Center Stadium; Attendance: 70,588; Referee: Mooud Bonyadifard (Iran)

5 June 2026 World Cup Qualifiers Round 3	Australia	1–0	Japan	Perth, Australia
19:00 UTC+8	Behich 90'	Report		Stadium: Perth Stadium; Attendance: 57,226; Referee: Qasim Al-Hatmi (Oman)

10 June 2026 World Cup Qualifiers Round 3	Saudi Arabia	1–2	Australia	Jeddah, Saudi Arabia
21:15 UTC+3	Al-Aboud 19'	Report	Metcalfe 42'; Duke 48'	Stadium: King Abdullah Sports City; Attendance: 24,620; Referee: Abdulrahman Al-Jassim (Qatar)

5 September Soccer Ashes	Australia	1–0	New Zealand	Canberra, Australia
19:45 UTC+10	Balard 87'	Report		Stadium: GIO Stadium; Attendance: 19,115; Referee: Donald Robertson (Scotland)

9 September Soccer Ashes	New Zealand	1–3	Australia	Auckland, New Zealand
19:00 UTC+12	Wood 57'	Report	Toure 35', 60'; Irankunda 54'	Stadium: Go Media Stadium; Attendance: 18,213; Referee: Donald Robertson

10 October Friendly	Canada	0–1	Australia	Montreal, Canada
19:30 UTC−4		Report	Irankunda 71'	Stadium: Saputo Stadium; Attendance: 23,112; Referee: Steven Madrigal (Costa Rica)

14 October Friendly	United States	2–1	Australia	Denver, United States
21:00 UTC−4	Wright 33', 51'	Report	Bos 19'	Stadium: Dick's Sporting Goods Park; Attendance: 18,218; Referee: Pierre-Luc Lauziere (Canada)

14 November Friendly	Venezuela	1–0	Australia	Houston, United States
20:00 UTC−6	Ramírez 38'	Report		Stadium: Shell Energy Stadium; Referee: Armando Villarreal (United States)

18 November Friendly	Colombia	3–0	Australia	New York City, United States
20:30 UTC−4	Rodríguez 76' (pen.); Díaz 89'; Lerma 90+3'	Report		Stadium: Citi Field; Referee: Tori Penso (United States)

=== 2026 ===
27 March 2026 FIFA Series	Australia	1–0	Cameroon	Sydney, Australia
20:10 UTC+11	Bos 84'	Report		Stadium: Accor Stadium; Attendance: 23,798; Referee: Robert Jones (England)

31 March 2026 FIFA Series	Australia	5–1	Curaçao	Melbourne, Australia
20:10 UTC+11	Mabil 23'; Circati 67'; Bos 71'; Irankunda 80', 84'	Report	Martha 50'	Stadium: AAMI Park; Attendance: 16,764; Referee: Andrew Madley (England)

30 May Friendly	Mexico	1–0	Australia	Pasadena, United States
18:00 UTC−7	Vásquez 27'	Report		Stadium: Rose Bowl; Attendance: 78,479; Referee: Rubiel Vásquez (United States)

6 June Friendly	Switzerland	1–1	Australia	San Diego, United States
12:00 UTC−7	Ndoye 14'	Report	Yengi 56'	Stadium: Snapdragon Stadium; Attendance: 6,107; Referee: Katja Koroleva (United States)

13 June 2026 World Cup GS	Australia	2–0	Turkey	Vancouver, Canada
21:00 UTC−7	Irankunda 27'; Metcalfe 75'	Report		Stadium: BC Place; Attendance: 52,497; Referee: Jesús Valenzuela (Venezuela)

19 June 2026 World Cup GS	United States	2–0	Australia	Seattle, United States
12:00 UTC−7	Burgess 11' (o.g.); Freeman 43'	Report		Stadium: Lumen Field; Attendance: 66,925; Referee: Felix Zwayer (Germany)

25 June 2026 World Cup GS	Paraguay	0–0	Australia	Santa Clara, United States
19:00 UTC−7		Report		Stadium: Levi's Stadium; Attendance: 68,827; Referee: Clément Turpin (France)

3 July 2026 World Cup R32	Australia	1–1 (a.e.t.) (2–4 p)	Egypt	Arlington, United States
13:00 UTC−5	Hany 55' (o.g.)	Report	Ashour 13'	Stadium: AT&T Stadium; Attendance: 70,244; Referee: Gustavo Tejera (Uruguay)
	Penalties
	Souttar (penalty missed); Irvine (penalty scored); Mabil (penalty scored); Herrington (penalty missed)		(penalty scored) Saber; (penalty scored) Rabia; (penalty scored) Salah; (penalty scored) Abdelmaguid

25 September Friendly	Australia	1–1	Brazil	Townsville, Australia
20:00 UTC+10	Irankunda 68'	Report	Rayan 90+5'	Stadium: Queensland Country Bank Stadium; Attendance: 25,440; Referee: Ryo Tanimoto (Japan)

29 September Friendly	Australia	2–4	Brazil	Brisbane, Australia
20:00 UTC+10	Circati 30'; Metcalfe 34'	Report	Vanderson 3'; Raphinha 45+1' (pen.); Guimarães 70'; Vinícius 80' (pen.)	Stadium: Suncorp Stadium; Attendance: 52,423; Referee: Yusuke Araki (Japan)

13 November Friendly	Qatar	0–3	Australia	Doha, Qatar
17:45 UTC+3		Report	McGree 5'; Yengi 32'; Irankunda 40'	Stadium: Abdullah bin Khalifa Stadium; Referee: Yahya Al-Mulla (United Arab Emirates)

17 November Friendly	Jordan	2–0	Australia	Doha, Qatar (Note: On 12 November, the Jordan Football Association and Football Australia announced that the match would be relocated from Amman, Jordan to Doha, Qatar due to "security concerns.")
19:00 UTC+3	Al-Taamari 34'; Olwan 90+3'	Report		Stadium: Suheim bin Hamad Stadium; Attendance: 7,000; Referee: Saud Al-Samhan (Kuwait)

=== 2027 ===
TBA 2027 Asian Cup GS	Australia	Postponed	Singapore	Khobar, Saudi Arabia
				Stadium: Aramco Stadium

TBA 2027 Asian Cup GS	Iraq	Postponed	Australia	Riyadh, Saudi Arabia
				Stadium: King Saud University Stadium

TBA 2027 Asian Cup GS	Australia	Postponed	Tajikistan	Riyadh, Saudi Arabia
				Stadium: Al Shabab Stadium

== See also ==
- Australia men's national soccer team results (2000–2019)
- Australia men's national soccer team results (1980–1999)
- Australia men's national soccer team results (1950–1979)
- Australia men's national soccer team results (1922–1949)
- Australia men's national soccer team results (unofficial matches)
- Australia men's national soccer B team matches
