= 2022 FIFA World Cup qualification (AFC–CONMEBOL play-off) =

- Event: 2022 FIFA World Cup qualification
Australia	Peru
0	0
- After extra time Australia won 5–4 on penalties
- Date: 13 June 2022
- Venue: Ahmad bin Ali Stadium, Al Rayyan, Qatar
- Referee: Slavko Vinčić (Slovenia)
- Attendance: 43,510
- Weather: Fair; 32 °C (90 °F); 70% humidity

The 2022 FIFA World Cup qualification AFC–CONMEBOL play-off was a single-leg match between the winner of the AFC qualification fourth round play-off, Australia, and the fifth-placed team from CONMEBOL qualification, Peru. The match was played on 13 June 2022 at the Ahmad bin Ali Stadium in Al Rayyan, Qatar (one of the host cities of the World Cup). Australia won 5–4 on penalties following a 0–0 draw after extra time to qualify for the 2022 FIFA World Cup.

== Background ==
The draw for the inter-confederation play-offs fixtures was held on 26 November 2021.

The match was the second meeting between Australia and Peru. The sides previously met four years earlier in the 2018 FIFA World Cup Group C, with Peru winning 2–0 when La Blanquirroja was already eliminated. Before the match, most football commentators lauded Peru as the better team and had low expectations of Australia, which struggled in the Asian qualifiers.

== Venue ==
City	Stadium	Location of the host city of the match.
Al Rayyan (Doha Area)	Ahmad bin Ali Stadium	Location of the host city of the match.
Capacity: 45,032		Location of the host city of the match.

== Match ==
=== Summary ===
The match ended as a scoreless draw. In the 120th minute, Australian goalkeeper Mathew Ryan was subbed off for Andrew Redmayne. During the penalty shoot-out, Redmayne gained notoriety for his dance-like movements, which he used to confuse the Peruvian players. This strategy succeeded, as Redmayne stopped the decisive penalty from Alex Valera diving low to his right-hand side.

Graham Arnold's decision to sub Redmayne in evoked the 2014 FIFA World Cup quarter-final match between Costa Rica and the Netherlands, when Dutch coach Louis van Gaal subbed Jasper Cillessen off for Tim Krul in the 120th minute, as Krul successfully stopped two penalties to eliminate Costa Rica. Redmayne had a reputation in Australia for being a penalty saving specialist, having saved two penalties against Perth Glory in the 2019 A-League Grand Final to secure a 4–1 shoot-out victory.

=== Details ===
13 June 2022
21:00 UTC+3

Australia	0–0 (a.e.t.)	Peru
	Report
Penalties
Boyle (penalty missed); Mooy (penalty scored); Goodwin (penalty scored); Hrustic (penalty scored); Maclaren (penalty scored); Mabil (penalty scored)	5–4	(penalty scored) Lapadula; (penalty scored) Callens; (penalty missed) Advíncula; (penalty scored) Tapia; (penalty scored) Flores; (penalty missed) Valera

Ahmad bin Ali Stadium, Al Rayyan (Qatar)
Attendance: 43,510
Referee: Slavko Vinčić (Slovenia)

Australia	Peru

GK	1	Mathew Ryan (c)		(substituted off) 120'
RB	4	Nathaniel Atkinson	(yellow card) 12'	(substituted off) 91'
CB	8	Bailey Wright
CB	17	Kye Rowles
LB	16	Aziz Behich		(substituted off) 120'
DM	13	Aaron Mooy
RM	6	Martin Boyle
CM	10	Ajdin Hrustic
CM	22	Jackson Irvine
LM	7	Mathew Leckie		(substituted off) 86'
CF	15	Mitchell Duke		(substituted off) 69'
Substitutes:
GK	12	Andrew Redmayne		(substituted on) 120'
GK	18	Danny Vukovic
DF	2	Miloš Degenek
DF	3	Fran Karačić		(substituted on) 91'
DF	20	Trent Sainsbury
MF	5	Denis Genreau
MF	14	Riley McGree
FW	9	Jamie Maclaren		(substituted on) 86'
FW	11	Awer Mabil		(substituted on) 69'
FW	19	Craig Goodwin		(substituted on) 120'
FW	21	Marco Tilio
FW	23	Nicholas D'Agostino
Manager:
(Australia) Graham Arnold

GK	1	Pedro Gallese (c)
RB	17	Luis Advíncula
CB	5	Carlos Zambrano
CB	22	Alexander Callens
LB	6	Miguel Trauco
DM	13	Renato Tapia
CM	8	Sergio Peña		(substituted off) 80'
CM	16	Christofer Gonzáles
RW	18	André Carrillo		(substituted off) 65'
LW	10	Christian Cueva		(substituted off) 116'
CF	9	Gianluca Lapadula
Substitutes:
GK	12	Ángelo Campos
GK	21	José Carvallo
DF	2	Luis Abram
DF	3	Aldo Corzo
DF	4	Marcos López
DF	15	Miguel Araujo
MF	14	Wilder Cartagena
MF	19	Horacio Calcaterra
MF	20	Edison Flores	(yellow card) 102'	(substituted on) 65'
MF	23	Pedro Aquino		(substituted on) 80'
FW	7	Alex Valera		(substituted on) 116'
FW	11	Santiago Ormeño
Manager:
(Argentina) Ricardo Gareca

Assistant referees:
Tomaž Klančnik (Slovenia)
Andraž Kovačič (Slovenia)
Fourth official:
Victor Gomes (South Africa)
Reserve assistant referee:
Zakhele Siwela (South Africa)
Video assistant referee:
Juan Martínez Munuera (Spain)
Assistant video assistant referees:
Jérôme Brisard (France)
Jerson dos Santos (Angola)

Match rules

- 90 minutes
- 30 minutes of extra time if necessary
- Penalty shoot-out if scores still level
- Twelve named substitutes
- Maximum of five substitutions, with a sixth allowed in extra time (Note: Each team was given only three opportunities to make substitutions, with a fourth opportunity in extra time, excluding substitutions made at half-time, before the start of extra time and at half-time in extra time.)
