= 2022 FIFA World Cup qualification (OFC) =

Tournament details
- Host country: Qatar
- Dates: 17–30 March 2022
- Teams: 7 (from 1 confederation)
- Venues: 2 (in 1 host city)

Tournament statistics
- Matches played: 11
- Goals scored: 37 (3.36 per match)
- Attendance: 0 (0 per match)
- Top scorer: (New Zealand) Chris Wood (5 goals)

The Oceanian section of the 2022 FIFA World Cup qualification acted as qualifiers for the 2022 FIFA World Cup, held in Qatar, for national teams which were members of the Oceania Football Confederation (OFC). A total of 0.5 slots in the final tournament were available for OFC teams, which equated to one inter-confederation play-off slot.

Due to the COVID-19 pandemic in Oceania, the qualification was held as a centralised tournament in Qatar (host country of the World Cup) from 17 to 30 March 2022.

== Format ==
In November 2021, the OFC confirmed the format for the qualifiers in response to the COVID-19 pandemic. The qualifying stage was to be a single match on 13 March 2022 between the two lowest-ranked participating OFC nations in the FIFA World Rankings, with the winner advancing to the group stage, but Tonga withdrew from the qualification match causing Cook Islands to automatically enter the group stage. Then eight remaining teams were drawn into two groups of four, playing single leg round-robin. The top two teams from each group advanced to a single leg knockout stage. The final winner advanced to the inter-confederation play-offs.

== Entrants ==
On 28 July 2020, the OFC confirmed that the qualifications would involve all eleven OFC teams. On 29 November 2021, the date of the group stage draw, FIFA reported that nine of the eleven FIFA-affiliated national teams from the OFC would enter qualification, as American Samoa and Samoa had withdrawn. On 29 January 2022, two months after the group stage draw but two months before the competition was to begin, Tonga also withdrew due to the 2022 Hunga Tonga–Hunga Ha'apai eruption and tsunami. On 19 March 2022, Vanuatu withdrew after the tournament had started due to the majority of players testing positive for COVID-19. On 23 March 2022, Cook Islands also withdrew after the tournament had started due to players testing positive for COVID-19.

From the November 2021 FIFA World Rankings
Entering qualification	Withdrew before playing
1. New Zealand (110); 2. Solomon Islands (141); 3. New Caledonia (153); 4. Tahiti (159); 5. Fiji (161); 6. Papua New Guinea (164); 7. Cook Islands (NR)	Vanuatu (163); American Samoa (190); Samoa (193); Tonga (199)

== Schedule ==
Qualifying was initially expected to begin in September 2020, but many international matches scheduled for the FIFA window in that month were cancelled in June 2020 due to the COVID-19 pandemic, while the inter-confederation play-offs were also moved from March to June 2022.

In November 2020, the OFC announced a further delay in the qualifying process until June 2021.

In March 2021, the confederation announced that this timeframe would not be achievable either, outlining a potential option organise a competition in January 2022, keeping the FIFA International Match Calendar dates in March available for preparation matches ahead of the inter-confederation play-off in June. Fiji and New Caledonia were proposed as possible venues.

By September 2021, continued delays meant that the OFC felt it was "not possible at this time to organise a qualifying competition within the Oceania region" and, as an alternative, they requested FIFA's approval for the qualification to be held in Qatar in March 2022. This was confirmed by FIFA on 29 November 2021.

== Venues ==
The matches were played at two stadiums in the city of Doha.

Doha		Location of the host city of the qualification.
Al-Arabi Stadium (Grand Hamad Stadium)	Qatar SC Stadium (Suheim bin Hamad Stadium)	Location of the host city of the qualification.
Capacity: 13,000	Capacity: 15,000	Location of the host city of the qualification.

== Qualification match ==
A qualification match was due to be held between the two lowest-ranked teams (Tonga and the Cook Islands) to determine the eighth team to compete in the group stage. The match was cancelled after Tonga withdrew due to the effects of the 2022 Hunga Tonga–Hunga Ha'apai eruption and tsunami; the Cook Islands advanced to the group stage.

=== Summary ===
Team 1	Score	Team 2
Tonga	Canc.	Cook Islands

=== Match ===
13 March 2022
20:00 UTC+3

Tonga	Cancelled	Cook Islands
	Report (FIFA); Report (OFC)

Al-Arabi Stadium, Doha

Tonga withdrew, and therefore the Cook Islands advanced by walkover.

== Group stage ==
The seven highest ranking OFC teams which entered the competition were given a bye to the group stage alongside the winner of the qualification match. The teams were divided into two groups, each containing four teams. Each team played every other team in their group once in a round-robin format, and the winners and runners-up of each group advanced to the semi-finals.

=== Draw ===
The group stage draw was held in Zürich, Switzerland, on 29 November 2021, 21:00 CET (30 November, 09:00 NZDT). The identity of the qualification match winner was not known at the time of the draw. The draw began with pot 2 and finished with pot 1, with teams being allocated to the groups sequentially (firstly A, then B). The first two teams drawn were assigned to position 4, while the next two were assigned to position 3, and the first two from pot 1 to position 2. The two highest ranked teams, New Zealand and the Solomon Islands, were assigned to positions A1 and B1, and were therefore not drawn in the same group.

From the November 2021 FIFA World Rankings
Pot 1	Pot 2
1. New Zealand (110); 2. Solomon Islands (141); 3. New Caledonia (153); 4. Tahiti (159)	5. Fiji (161); 6. Vanuatu (163); 7. Papua New Guinea (164); 8. Qualification match winner

The draw resulted in the following groups:

Group A
Pos	Team
A1	Solomon Islands
A2	Tahiti
A3	Vanuatu
A4	Cook Islands (Note: The identity of the team was not known at the time of the draw.)

Group B
Pos	Team
B1	New Zealand
B2	New Caledonia
B3	Fiji
B4	Papua New Guinea

The fixtures for the group stage were decided based on the draw results, as follows:

Group stage schedule
Matchday	Dates	Matches
Matchday 1	17–18 March 2022	4 v 1, 2 v 3
Matchday 2	20–21 March 2022	1 v 3, 4 v 2
Matchday 3	24 March 2022	1 v 2, 3 v 4

=== Group A ===
Pos	Team	Pld	W	D	L	GF	GA	GD	Pts	Qualification	(Solomon Islands)	(French Polynesia)	(Vanuatu)	(Cook Islands)
1	Solomon Islands	1	1	0	0	3	1	+2	3	Advance to final stage	—	3–1	Canc.	—
2	Tahiti	1	0	0	1	1	3	−2	0	Advance to final stage	—	—	Canc.	—
3	Vanuatu	0	0	0	0	0	0	0	0	Withdrew (Note: Due to COVID-19 outbreaks in their respective squads, Vanuatu and the Cook Islands both withdrew during this stage. The remaining matches involving either team were cancelled, and the result of Cook Islands vs Solomon Islands was excluded from the standings.)	—	—	—	Canc.
4	Cook Islands	0	0	0	0	0	0	0	0	Withdrew	~~0–2~~	Canc.	—	—

Source: FIFA, OFC
Rules for classification: Tiebreakers
Notes:
17 March 2022
17:00 UTC+3

Cook Islands	Not counted (0–2)	Solomon Islands
	Report (FIFA); Report (OFC)	Kaua 20'; Hou 45+1'

Al-Arabi Stadium, Doha
Attendance: 0
Referee: David Yareboinen (Papua New Guinea)

The result was eventually excluded from the group standings after the withdrawal of the Cook Islands.

17 March 2022
20:00 UTC+3

Tahiti	Cancelled	Vanuatu
	Report (FIFA); Report (OFC)

Al-Arabi Stadium, Doha
Referee: Matthew Conger (New Zealand)

The match was cancelled due to a COVID-19 outbreak in the Vanuatu squad. Vanuatu withdrew on 19 March, resulting in the cancellation of the remaining matches involving them.

20 March 2022
17:00 UTC+3

Cook Islands	Cancelled	Tahiti
	Report (FIFA); Report (OFC)

Al-Arabi Stadium, Doha
Referee: Mederic Lacour (New Caledonia)

The match was cancelled due to a COVID-19 outbreak in the Cook Islands squad. The Cook Islands withdrew on 23 March.

20 March 2022
20:00 UTC+3

Solomon Islands	Cancelled	Vanuatu
	Report (FIFA); Report (OFC)

Al-Arabi Stadium, Doha
Referee: Campbell-Kirk Waugh (New Zealand)

24 March 2022
17:00 UTC+3

Vanuatu	Cancelled	Cook Islands
	Report (FIFA); Report (OFC)

Qatar SC Stadium, Doha
24 March 2022
17:00 UTC+3

Solomon Islands	3–1	Tahiti
Lea'i 20', 52', 90+6'	Report (FIFA); Report (OFC)	A. Tehau 26'

Al-Arabi Stadium, Doha
Attendance: 0
Referee: Matthew Conger (New Zealand)

Due to the withdrawals of the other two teams and the cancellation or nullification of all other matches, this match was played as a single-leg play-off, with provisions for extra time and penalties in the event of a tie after normal time.

=== Group B ===
Pos	Team	Pld	W	D	L	GF	GA	GD	Pts	Qualification	(New Zealand)	(Papua New Guinea)	(Fiji)	(New Caledonia)
1	New Zealand	3	3	0	0	12	1	+11	9	Advance to final stage	—	—	4–0	7–1
2	Papua New Guinea	3	2	0	1	3	2	+1	6	Advance to final stage	0–1	—	—	1–0
3	Fiji	3	1	0	2	3	7	−4	3		—	1–2	—	—
4	New Caledonia	3	0	0	3	2	10	−8	0		—	—	1–2	—

Source: FIFA, OFC
Rules for classification: Tiebreakers
18 March 2022
17:00 UTC+3

Papua New Guinea	0–1	New Zealand
	Report (FIFA); Report (OFC)	Waine 75'

Qatar SC Stadium, Doha
Attendance: 0
Referee: Saoud Ali Al-Adba (Qatar)
18 March 2022
20:00 UTC+3

New Caledonia	1–2	Fiji
Wetria 78'	Report (FIFA); Report (OFC)	Nalaubu 11', 89'

Qatar SC Stadium, Doha
Attendance: 0
Referee: Mohammed Al-Shammari (Qatar)

21 March 2022
17:00 UTC+3

Papua New Guinea	1–0	New Caledonia
Semmy 8'	Report (FIFA); Report (OFC)

Qatar SC Stadium, Doha
Attendance: 0
Referee: Joel Hopken (Vanuatu)
21 March 2022
20:00 UTC+3

New Zealand	4–0	Fiji
Wood 45', 73'; Just 71'; Lewis 90+3' (pen.)	Report (FIFA); Report (OFC)

Qatar SC Stadium, Doha
Attendance: 0
Referee: Salman Falahi (Qatar)

24 March 2022
20:00 UTC+3

New Zealand	7–1	New Caledonia
Greive 8', 45+2'; Rogerson 36' (pen.); De Jong 75'; Tuiloma 81'; Wood 83', 89'	Report (FIFA); Report (OFC)	Saïko 12'

Qatar SC Stadium, Doha
Attendance: 0
Referee: Norbert Hauata (Tahiti)
24 March 2022
20:00 UTC+3

Fiji	1–2	Papua New Guinea
Waranaivalu 12'	Report (FIFA); Report (OFC)	A. Kepo 45+2'; Semmy 63'

Al-Arabi Stadium, Doha
Attendance: 0
Referee: Abdulhadi Al-Ruaile (Qatar)

== Final stage ==
In the single-leg matches of the final stage, if a match was level at the end of normal playing time, extra time was played (two periods of 15 minutes each) to decide the winner. If still tied after extra time, the match was decided by a penalty shoot-out.

=== Bracket ===
Semi-finals
27 March 2022 – Doha (Al-Arabi S.)
Solomon Islands	3
Papua New Guinea	2
27 March 2022 – Doha (Al-Arabi S.)
New Zealand	1
Tahiti	0

Final
30 March 2022 – Doha (Al-Arabi S.)
Solomon Islands	0
New Zealand	5

New Zealand defeated Solomon Islands 5–0 and advanced to the inter-confederation play-offs.

=== Semi-finals ===
27 March 2022
17:00 UTC+3

Solomon Islands	3–2	Papua New Guinea
Hou 33', 66'; Lea'i 71'	Report (FIFA); Report (OFC)	A. Komolong 24'; A. Kepo 88'

Al-Arabi Stadium, Doha
Attendance: 0
Referee: Mohammed Abdulla Hassan Mohamed (United Arab Emirates)

27 March 2022
20:30 UTC+3

New Zealand	1–0	Tahiti
Cacace 71'	Report (FIFA); Report (OFC)

Al-Arabi Stadium, Doha
Attendance: 0
Referee: Abdulrahman Al-Jassim (Qatar)

=== Final ===
The final winner advanced to the inter-confederation play-offs.

30 March 2022
20:00 UTC+3

Solomon Islands	0–5	New Zealand
	Report (FIFA); Report (OFC)	Tuiloma 23', 70'; Wood 39'; Bell 50'; Garbett 90+1'

Al-Arabi Stadium, Doha
Attendance: 0
Referee: Nawaf Shukralla (Bahrain)

== Inter-confederation play-off ==
The inter-confederation play-offs was determined by a draw held on 26 November 2021. The winner from OFC qualification was drawn against the fourth-placed team from CONCACAF qualification third round. The play-off was played as a single match in Qatar on 14 June 2022.

Team 1	Score	Team 2
Costa Rica	1–0	New Zealand

== Goalscorers ==
There were 37 goals scored in 11 matches, for an average of 3.36 goals per match.

5 goals

- (New Zealand) Chris Wood

4 goals

- (Solomon Islands) Raphael Lea'i

3 goals

- (New Zealand) Bill Tuiloma
- (Solomon Islands) Alwin Hou

2 goals

- (Fiji) Sairusi Nalaubu
- (New Zealand) Alex Greive
- (Papua New Guinea) Ati Kepo
- (Papua New Guinea) Tommy Semmy

1 goal

- (Fiji) Tevita Waranaivalu
- (New Caledonia) Jean-Philippe Saïko
- (New Caledonia) Jordan Wetria
- (New Zealand) Joe Bell
- (New Zealand) Liberato Cacace
- (New Zealand) Andre de Jong
- (New Zealand) Matthew Garbett
- (New Zealand) Elijah Just
- (New Zealand) Clayton Lewis
- (New Zealand) Logan Rogerson
- (New Zealand) Ben Waine
- (Papua New Guinea) Alwin Komolong
- (Solomon Islands) Atkin Kaua
- (French Polynesia) Alvin Tehau
