= 2022 FIFA World Cup qualification – AFC third round =

International football competition

Tournament details
- Dates: 2 September 2021 – 29 March 2022
- Teams: 12 (from 1 confederation)

Tournament statistics
- Matches played: 60
- Goals scored: 122 (2.03 per match)
- Attendance: 639,277 (10,655 per match)
- Top scorer(s): (China) Wu Lei (Iran) Alireza Jahanbakhsh (Iran) Mehdi Taremi (Japan) Junya Itō (Saudi Arabia) Saleh Al-Shehri (South Korea) Son Heung-min (4 goals each)

The third round (Note: On the AFC's official YouTube page, "The AFC Hub," it is referred to as the Final Round.) of AFC matches for the 2022 FIFA World Cup qualification was played from 2 September 2021 to 29 March 2022.

== Format ==
The twelve teams that advanced from the second round (the seven group winners excluding Qatar and the five best group runners-up) were divided into two groups of six teams to play home-and-away round-robin matches. The top two teams of each group qualified for the 2022 FIFA World Cup, and the two third-placed teams advanced to the fourth round. World Cup hosts Qatar won Group E in the second round (which meant they advanced to the 2023 AFC Asian Cup finals) but were not required to qualify for the World Cup.

== Qualified teams ==
Group (Second round)	Winners	Best 5 Runners-up
A	Syria	China
B	Australia	—
C	Iran	Iraq
D	Saudi Arabia	—
E	~~Qatar~~	Oman
F	Japan	—
G	United Arab Emirates	Vietnam
H	South Korea	Lebanon

== Draw and seeding ==
The draw for the third round was held on 1 July 2021 at 15:00 MST (UTC+8), in Kuala Lumpur, Malaysia.

The seeding for the draw was based on a special release of the FIFA Men's World Rankings for Asian teams on 18 June 2021 (shown in parentheses below).

Each group contained one team from each of the six pots.

Note: Bolded teams qualified directly for the World Cup. Italicised teams qualified for the fourth round.

Pot 1	Pot 2	Pot 3
1. **Japan** (24); 2. **Iran** (26)	3. Australia (35); 4. **South Korea** (36)	5. **Saudi Arabia** (61); 6. United Arab Emirates (68)
Pot 4	Pot 5	Pot 6
7. Iraq (70); 8. China (71)	9. Oman (79); 10. Syria (80)	11. Vietnam (92); 12. Lebanon (98)

== Schedule ==
Due to the COVID-19 pandemic in Asia, FIFA announced on 12 August 2020 that the upcoming qualifying matches originally scheduled for 2020 were moved to 2021, and on 11 November, the AFC Competitions Committee also announced that the final round of the Asian qualifiers would begin in September 2021 and be finished by March 2022.

Matchday	Date	Original date
Matchday 1	2 September 2021	3 September 2020
Matchday 2	7 September 2021	8 September 2020
Matchday 3	7 October 2021	13 October 2020
Matchday 4	12 October 2021	12 November 2020
Matchday 5	11 November 2021	17 November 2020
Matchday 6	16 November 2021	25 March 2021
Matchday 7	27 January 2022	30 March 2021
Matchday 8	1 February 2022	8 June 2021
Matchday 9	24 March 2022	7 September 2021
Matchday 10	29 March 2022	12 October 2021

== Groups ==
=== Group A ===
Pos	Team	Pld	W	D	L	GF	GA	GD	Pts	Qualification	Iran	South Korea	United Arab Emirates	Iraq	United Arab Republic	Lebanon
1	Iran	10	8	1	1	15	4	+11	25	2022 FIFA World Cup	—	1–1	1–0	1–0	1–0	2–0
2	South Korea	10	7	2	1	13	3	+10	23	2022 FIFA World Cup	2–0	—	1–0	0–0	2–1	1–0
3	United Arab Emirates	10	3	3	4	7	7	0	12	Fourth round	0–1	1–0	—	2–2	2–0	0–0
4	Iraq	10	1	6	3	6	12	−6	9		0–3	0–3	1–0	—	1–1	0–0
5	Syria	10	1	3	6	9	16	−7	6		0–3	0–2	1–1	1–1	—	2–3
6	Lebanon	10	1	3	6	5	13	−8	6		1–2	0–1	0–1	1–1	0–3	—

Source: FIFA, AFC
Rules for classification: Tiebreakers
2 September 2021
20:00 UTC+9

South Korea	0–0	Iraq
	Report (FIFA); Report (AFC)

Seoul World Cup Stadium, Seoul
Attendance: 0 (Note: Due to the COVID-19 pandemic in Asia, the match was played behind closed doors.)
Referee: Nawaf Shukralla (Bahrain)
2 September 2021
20:30 UTC+4:30

Iran	1–0	Syria
Jahanbakhsh 56'	Report (FIFA); Report (AFC)

Azadi Stadium, Tehran
Attendance: 0
Referee: Ryuji Sato (Japan)
2 September 2021
20:45 UTC+4

United Arab Emirates	0–0	Lebanon
	Report (FIFA); Report (AFC)

Zabeel Stadium, Dubai
Attendance: 1,513
Referee: Ma Ning (China PR)

7 September 2021
20:00 UTC+9

South Korea	1–0	Lebanon
Kwon Chang-hoon 59'	Report (FIFA); Report (AFC)

Suwon World Cup Stadium, Suwon (Note: The Korean FA (South Korea) and Lebanese FA (Lebanon) agreed to switch the order of their home-and-away matches.)
Attendance: 0
Referee: Ryuji Sato (Japan)
7 September 2021
19:00 UTC+3

Syria	1–1	United Arab Emirates
Al Baher 64'	Report (FIFA); Report (AFC)	Mabkhout 12'

King Abdullah II Stadium, Amman (Jordan) (Note: Due to the Syrian civil war, Syria played its home matches at neutral venues.)
Attendance: 2,370
Referee: Ahmed Al-Kaf (Oman)
7 September 2021
21:00 UTC+3

Iraq	0–3	Iran
	Report (FIFA); Report (AFC)	Jahanbakhsh 3'; Taremi 69'; Gholizadeh 90'

Khalifa International Stadium, Al Rayyan (Qatar) (Note: Due to the security concerns, Iraq played its home matches at neutral venues.)
Attendance: 0
Referee: Ma Ning (China PR)

7 October 2021
20:00 UTC+9

South Korea	2–1	Syria
Hwang In-beom 47'; Son Heung-min 88'	Report (FIFA); Report (AFC)	Khribin 83'

Ansan Wa~ Stadium, Ansan
Attendance: 0
Referee: Abdulrahman Al-Jassim (Qatar)
7 October 2021
17:30 UTC+3

Iraq	0–0	Lebanon
	Report (FIFA); Report (AFC)

Khalifa International Stadium, Al Rayyan (Qatar)
Attendance: 0
Referee: Turki Al-Khudhayr (Saudi Arabia)
7 October 2021
20:45 UTC+4

United Arab Emirates	0–1	Iran
	Report (FIFA); Report (AFC)	Taremi 70'

Zabeel Stadium, Dubai
Attendance: 3,034
Referee: Chris Beath (Australia)

12 October 2021
17:00 UTC+3:30

Iran	1–1	South Korea
Jahanbakhsh 76'	Report (FIFA); Report (AFC)	Son Heung-min 48'

Azadi Stadium, Tehran
Attendance: 0
Referee: Ahmed Al-Kaf (Oman)
12 October 2021
20:45 UTC+4

United Arab Emirates	2–2	Iraq
Caio 34'; Mabkhout 90+4'	Report (FIFA); Report (AFC)	Al-Attas 74' (o.g.); Hussein 89'

Zabeel Stadium, Dubai
Attendance: 2,820
Referee: Ryuji Sato (Japan)
12 October 2021
19:00 UTC+3

Syria	2–3	Lebanon
Khribin 20'; Al Somah 64'	Report (FIFA); Report (AFC)	Kdouh 45+1', 45+3'; Saad 53'

King Abdullah II Stadium, Amman (Jordan)
Attendance: 2,377
Referee: Chris Beath (Australia)

11 November 2021
20:00 UTC+9

South Korea	1–0	United Arab Emirates
Hwang Hee-chan 36' (pen.)	Report (FIFA); Report (AFC)

Goyang Stadium, Goyang
Attendance: 30,152
Referee: Ma Ning (China PR)
11 November 2021
14:00 UTC+2

Lebanon	1–2	Iran
Saad 37'	Report (FIFA); Report (AFC)	Azmoun 90+1'; Nourollahi 90+5'

Saida Municipal Stadium, Sidon
Attendance: 0
Referee: Abdulrahman Al-Jassim (Qatar)
11 November 2021
20:00 UTC+3

Iraq	1–1	Syria
Al-Ammari 86' (pen.)	Report (FIFA); Report (AFC)	Al Somah 79'

Thani bin Jassim Stadium, Al Rayyan (Qatar)
Attendance: 50
Referee: Nawaf Shukralla (Bahrain)

16 November 2021
18:00 UTC+3

Iraq	0–3	South Korea
	Report (FIFA); Report (AFC)	Lee Jae-sung 33'; Son Heung-min 74' (pen.); Jeong Woo-yeong 80'

Thani bin Jassim Stadium, Al Rayyan (Qatar)
Attendance: 0
Referee: Ilgiz Tantashev (Uzbekistan)
16 November 2021
18:00 UTC+2

Syria	0–3	Iran
	Report (FIFA); Report (AFC)	Azmoun 33'; Hajsafi 42' (pen.); Gholizadeh 89'

King Abdullah II Stadium, Amman (Jordan)
Attendance: 907
Referee: Ma Ning (China PR)
16 November 2021
14:00 UTC+2

Lebanon	0–1	United Arab Emirates
	Report (FIFA); Report (AFC)	Mabkhout 85' (pen.)

Saida Municipal Stadium, Sidon
Attendance: 0
Referee: Shaun Evans (Australia)

27 January 2022
14:00 UTC+2

Lebanon	0–1	South Korea
	Report (FIFA); Report (AFC)	Cho Gue-sung 45+1'

Saida Municipal Stadium, Sidon
Attendance: 5,400
Referee: Ahmed Al-Kaf (Oman)
27 January 2022
18:00 UTC+3:30

Iran	1–0	Iraq
Taremi 48'	Report (FIFA); Report (AFC)

Azadi Stadium, Tehran
Attendance: 9,354
Referee: Chris Beath (Australia)
27 January 2022
19:00 UTC+4

United Arab Emirates	2–0	Syria
Caio 43'; Al Ghassani 70'	Report (FIFA); Report (AFC)

Al Maktoum Stadium, Dubai
Attendance: 2,450
Referee: Ilgiz Tantashev (Uzbekistan)

1 February 2022
14:00 UTC+2

Lebanon	1–1	Iraq
Sabra 45+2'	Report (FIFA); Report (AFC)	Hussein 39'

Saida Municipal Stadium, Sidon
Attendance: 6,341
Referee: Adham Makhadmeh (Jordan)
1 February 2022
18:00 UTC+4

Syria	0–2	South Korea
	Report (FIFA); Report (AFC)	Kim Jin-su 53'; Kwon Chang-hoon 71'

Rashid Stadium, Dubai (United Arab Emirates)
Attendance: 310
Referee: Hiroyuki Kimura (Japan)
1 February 2022
18:00 UTC+3:30

Iran	1–0	United Arab Emirates
Taremi 44'	Report (FIFA); Report (AFC)

Azadi Stadium, Tehran
Attendance: 0
Referee: Ahmed Al-Kaf (Oman)

24 March 2022
20:00 UTC+9

South Korea	2–0	Iran
Son Heung-min 45+2'; Kim Young-gwon 62'	Report (FIFA); Report (AFC)

Seoul World Cup Stadium, Seoul
Attendance: 64,375
Referee: Chris Beath (Australia)
24 March 2022
14:00 UTC+2

Lebanon	0–3	Syria
	Report (FIFA); Report (AFC)	Al Dali 14'; Mardikian 38' (pen.); Al Marmour 44'

Saida Municipal Stadium, Sidon
Attendance: 5,422
Referee: Abdulrahman Al-Jassim (Qatar)
24 March 2022
20:00 UTC+3

Iraq	1–0	United Arab Emirates
Al-Saedi 53'	Report (FIFA); Report (AFC)

King Fahd International Stadium, Riyadh (Saudi Arabia)
Attendance: 1,320
Referee: Ma Ning (China PR)

29 March 2022
16:00 UTC+4:30

Iran	2–0	Lebanon
Azmoun 35'; Jahanbakhsh 72'	Report (FIFA); Report (AFC)

Imam Reza Stadium, Mashhad
Attendance: 22,453
Referee: Fu Ming (China PR)
29 March 2022
17:45 UTC+4

United Arab Emirates	1–0	South Korea
Al-Maazmi 54'	Report (FIFA); Report (AFC)

Al Maktoum Stadium, Dubai
Attendance: 4,223
Referee: Ahmed Al-Kaf (Oman)
29 March 2022
17:45 UTC+4

Syria	1–1	Iraq
Al Dali 3'	Report (FIFA); Report (AFC)	Hussein 31'

Rashid Stadium, Dubai (United Arab Emirates)
Attendance: 3,710
Referee: Ryuji Sato (Japan)

=== Group B ===
Pos	Team	Pld	W	D	L	GF	GA	GD	Pts	Qualification	Saudi Arabia	Japan	Australia	Oman	People's Republic of China	Vietnam
1	Saudi Arabia	10	7	2	1	12	6	+6	23	2022 FIFA World Cup	—	1–0	1–0	1–0	3–2	3–1
2	Japan	10	7	1	2	12	4	+8	22	2022 FIFA World Cup	2–0	—	2–1	0–1	2–0	1–1
3	Australia	10	4	3	3	15	9	+6	15	Fourth round	0–0	0–2	—	3–1	3–0	4–0
4	Oman	10	4	2	4	11	10	+1	14		0–1	0–1	2–2	—	2–0	3–1
5	China	10	1	3	6	9	19	−10	6		1–1	0–1	1–1	1–1	—	3–2
6	Vietnam	10	1	1	8	8	19	−11	4		0–1	0–1	0–1	0–1	3–1	—

Source: FIFA, AFC
Rules for classification: Tiebreakers
2 September 2021
19:14 UTC+9

Japan	0–1	Oman
	Report (FIFA); Report (AFC)	Al-Sabhi 88'

Suita City Football Stadium, Suita
Attendance: 4,853
Referee: Mohammed Abdulla Hassan Mohamed (United Arab Emirates)
2 September 2021
21:00 UTC+3

Australia	3–0	China
Mabil 24'; Boyle 26'; Duke 70'	Report (FIFA); Report (AFC)

Khalifa International Stadium, Al Rayyan (Qatar) (Note: Due to the border closures in Australia because of COVID-19 pandemic, Australia played two of their home matches at neutral venues.)
Attendance: 0
Referee: Ko Hyung-jin (South Korea)
2 September 2021
21:00 UTC+3

Saudi Arabia	3–1	Vietnam
Al-Dawsari 55' (pen.); Al-Shahrani 67'; Al-Shehri 80' (pen.)	Report (FIFA); Report (AFC)	Nguyễn Quang Hải 3'

Mrsool Park, Riyadh
Attendance: 8,331
Referee: Ilgiz Tantashev (Uzbekistan)

7 September 2021
19:00 UTC+7

Vietnam	0–1	Australia
	Report (FIFA); Report (AFC)	Grant 43'

Mỹ Đình National Stadium, Hanoi
Attendance: 0
Referee: Abdulrahman Al-Jassim (Qatar)
7 September 2021
18:00 UTC+3

China	0–1	Japan
	Report (FIFA); Report (AFC)	Osako 40'

Khalifa International Stadium, Al Rayyan (Qatar) (Note: Due to the quarantine restrictions in China because of COVID-19 pandemic, China played its home matches at neutral venues.)
Attendance: 0
Referee: Nawaf Shukralla (Bahrain)
7 September 2021
20:00 UTC+4

Oman	0–1	Saudi Arabia
	Report (FIFA); Report (AFC)	Al-Shehri 42'

Sultan Qaboos Sports Complex, Muscat
Attendance: 8,150
Referee: Hanna Hattab (Syria)

7 October 2021
20:00 UTC+3

Saudi Arabia	1–0	Japan
Al-Buraikan 71'	Report (FIFA); Report (AFC)

King Abdullah Sports City, Jeddah
Attendance: 51,218
Referee: Adham Makhadmeh (Jordan)
7 October 2021
21:00 UTC+4

China	3–2	Vietnam
Zhang Yuning 53'; Wu Lei 75', 90+5'	Report (FIFA); Report (AFC)	Hồ Tấn Tài 80'; Nguyễn Tiến Linh 90'

Sharjah Stadium, Sharjah (United Arab Emirates)
Attendance: 0
Referee: Mohammed Abdulla Hassan Mohamed (United Arab Emirates)
7 October 2021
21:30 UTC+3

Australia	3–1	Oman
Mabil 9'; Boyle 49'; Duke 89'	Report (FIFA); Report (AFC)	R. Al-Alawi 28'

Khalifa International Stadium, Al Rayyan (Qatar)
Attendance: 0
Referee: Nawaf Shukralla (Bahrain)

12 October 2021
19:14 UTC+9

Japan	2–1	Australia
Tanaka 8'; Behich 85' (o.g.)	Report (FIFA); Report (AFC)	Hrustic 70'

Saitama Stadium 2002, Saitama
Attendance: 14,437
Referee: Abdulrahman Al-Jassim (Qatar)
12 October 2021
20:00 UTC+4

Oman	3–1	Vietnam
Al Sabhi 45+1'; Al-Khaldi 49'; Al-Yahyaei 63' (pen.)	Report (FIFA); Report (AFC)	Nguyễn Tiến Linh 39'

Sultan Qaboos Sports Complex, Muscat
Attendance: 9,123
Referee: Adham Makhadmeh (Jordan)
12 October 2021
20:00 UTC+3

Saudi Arabia	3–2	China
Al-Najei 15', 38'; Al-Buraikan 72'	Report (FIFA); Report (AFC)	Aloísio 46'; Wu Xi 87'

King Abdullah Sports City, Jeddah
Attendance: 54,124
Referee: Ilgiz Tantashev (Uzbekistan)

11 November 2021
20:10 UTC+11

Australia	0–0	Saudi Arabia
	Report (FIFA); Report (AFC)

Western Sydney Stadium, Sydney
Attendance: 23,314
Referee: Ko Hyung-jin (South Korea)
11 November 2021
19:00 UTC+7

Vietnam	0–1	Japan
	Report (FIFA); Report (AFC)	Itō 17'

Mỹ Đình National Stadium, Hanoi
Attendance: 11,022
Referee: Mohammed Abdulla Hassan Mohamed (United Arab Emirates)
11 November 2021
19:00 UTC+4

China	1–1	Oman
Wu Lei 21'	Report (FIFA); Report (AFC)	Al-Harthi 75'

Sharjah Stadium, Sharjah (United Arab Emirates)
Attendance: 1,700
Referee: Sivakorn Pu-udom (Thailand)

16 November 2021
19:00 UTC+4

China	1–1	Australia
Wu Lei 71' (pen.)	Report (FIFA); Report (AFC)	Duke 38'

Sharjah Stadium, Sharjah (United Arab Emirates)
Attendance: 1,050
Referee: Adham Makhadmeh (Jordan)
16 November 2021
20:00 UTC+4

Oman	0–1	Japan
	Report (FIFA); Report (AFC)	Itō 81'

Sultan Qaboos Sports Complex, Muscat
Attendance: 14,123
Referee: Ko Hyung-jin (South Korea)
16 November 2021
19:00 UTC+7

Vietnam	0–1	Saudi Arabia
	Report (FIFA); Report (AFC)	Al-Shehri 31'

Mỹ Đình National Stadium, Hanoi
Attendance: 9,669
Referee: Hanna Hattab (Syria)

27 January 2022
20:10 UTC+11

Australia	4–0	Vietnam
Maclaren 30'; Rogic 45+2'; Goodwin 72'; McGree 76'	Report (FIFA); Report (AFC)

Melbourne Rectangular Stadium, Melbourne
Attendance: 27,740
Referee: Ko Hyung-jin (South Korea)
27 January 2022
19:00 UTC+9

Japan	2–0	China
Osako 13' (pen.); Itō 61'	Report (FIFA); Report (AFC)

Saitama Stadium 2002, Saitama
Attendance: 11,753
Referee: Abdulrahman Al-Jassim (Qatar)
27 January 2022
20:15 UTC+3

Saudi Arabia	1–0	Oman
Al-Buraikan 48'	Report (FIFA); Report (AFC)

King Abdullah Sports City, Jeddah
Attendance: 47,364
Referee: Nawaf Shukralla (Bahrain)

1 February 2022
19:14 UTC+9

Japan	2–0	Saudi Arabia
Minamino 32'; Itō 50'	Report (FIFA); Report (AFC)

Saitama Stadium 2002, Saitama
Attendance: 19,118
Referee: Ko Hyung-jin (South Korea)
1 February 2022
19:00 UTC+7

Vietnam	3–1	China
Hồ Tấn Tài 9'; Nguyễn Tiến Linh 16'; Phan Văn Đức 76'	Report (FIFA); Report (AFC)	Xu Xin 90+7'

Mỹ Đình National Stadium, Hanoi
Attendance: 6,099
Referee: Nawaf Shukralla (Bahrain)
1 February 2022
20:00 UTC+4

Oman	2–2	Australia
Fawaz 54', 89' (pen.)	Report (FIFA); Report (AFC)	Maclaren 15' (pen.); Mooy 79'

Sultan Qaboos Sports Complex, Muscat
Attendance: 0
Referee: Mohammed Abdulla Hassan Mohamed (United Arab Emirates)

24 March 2022
20:10 UTC+11

Australia	0–2	Japan
	Report (FIFA); Report (AFC)	Mitoma 89', 90+4'

Stadium Australia, Sydney
Attendance: 41,852
Referee: Nawaf Shukralla (Bahrain)
24 March 2022
19:00 UTC+7

Vietnam	0–1	Oman
	Report (FIFA); Report (AFC)	Al-Hajri 65'

Mỹ Đình National Stadium, Hanoi
Attendance: 6,923
Referee: Hanna Hattab (Syria)
24 March 2022
19:00 UTC+4

China	1–1	Saudi Arabia
Zhu Chenjie 82' (pen.)	Report (FIFA); Report (AFC)	Al-Shehri 45+1'

Sharjah Stadium, Sharjah (United Arab Emirates)
Attendance: 200
Referee: Mohammed Abdulla Hassan Mohamed (United Arab Emirates)

29 March 2022
19:35 UTC+9

Japan	1–1	Vietnam
Yoshida 55'	Report (FIFA); Report (AFC)	Nguyễn Thanh Bình 19'

Saitama Stadium 2002, Saitama
Attendance: 44,600
Referee: Ilgiz Tantashev (Uzbekistan)
29 March 2022
20:00 UTC+4

Oman	2–0	China
Al-Alawi 12'; Fawaz 74'	Report (FIFA); Report (AFC)

Sultan Qaboos Sports Complex, Muscat
Attendance: 2,500
Referee: Ko Hyung-jin (South Korea)
29 March 2022
21:00 UTC+3

Saudi Arabia	1–0	Australia
Al-Dawsari 65' (pen.)	Report (FIFA); Report (AFC)

King Abdullah Sports City, Jeddah
Attendance: 51,433
Referee: Adham Makhadmeh (Jordan)

== Goalscorers ==
There were 122 goals scored in 60 matches, for an average of 2.03 goals per match.

4 goals

- (China national football team) Wu Lei
- (Iran national football team) Alireza Jahanbakhsh
- (Iran national football team) Mehdi Taremi
- (Japan national football team) Junya Itō
- (Saudi Arabia national football team) Saleh Al-Shehri
- (South Korea national football team) Son Heung-min

3 goals

- (Australia men's national soccer team) Mitchell Duke
- (Iran national football team) Sardar Azmoun
- (Iraq national football team) Aymen Hussein
- (Oman national football team) Abdullah Fawaz
- (Saudi Arabia national football team) Firas Al-Buraikan
- (United Arab Emirates national football team) Ali Mabkhout
- (Vietnam national football team) Nguyễn Tiến Linh

2 goals

- (Australia men's national soccer team) Martin Boyle
- (Australia men's national soccer team) Awer Mabil
- (Australia men's national soccer team) Jamie Maclaren
- (Iran national football team) Ali Gholizadeh
- (Japan national football team) Kaoru Mitoma
- (Japan national football team) Yuya Osako
- (Lebanon national football team) Mohamad Kdouh
- (Lebanon national football team) Soony Saad
- (Oman national football team) Issam Al Sabhi
- (Saudi Arabia national football team) Salem Al-Dawsari
- (Saudi Arabia national football team) Sami Al-Najei
- (South Korea national football team) Kwon Chang-hoon
- (Syria national football team) Alaa Al Dali
- (Syria national football team) Omar Al Somah
- (Syria national football team) Omar Khribin
- (United Arab Emirates national football team) Caio Canedo
- (Vietnam national football team) Hồ Tấn Tài

1 goal

- (Australia men's national soccer team) Craig Goodwin
- (Australia men's national soccer team) Rhyan Grant
- (Australia men's national soccer team) Ajdin Hrustic
- (Australia men's national soccer team) Riley McGree
- (Australia men's national soccer team) Aaron Mooy
- (Australia men's national soccer team) Tom Rogic
- (China national football team) Aloísio
- (China national football team) Wu Xi
- (China national football team) Xu Xin
- (China national football team) Zhang Yuning
- (China national football team) Zhu Chenjie
- (Iran national football team) Ehsan Hajsafi
- (Iran national football team) Ahmad Nourollahi
- (Iraq national football team) Amir Al-Ammari
- (Iraq national football team) Hussein Ali Al-Saedi
- (Japan national football team) Takumi Minamino
- (Japan national football team) Ao Tanaka
- (Japan national football team) Maya Yoshida
- (Lebanon national football team) Maher Sabra
- (Oman national football team) Arshad Al-Alawi
- (Oman national football team) Rabia Al-Alawi
- (Oman national football team) Khalid Al-Hajri
- (Oman national football team) Amjad Al-Harthi
- (Oman national football team) Mohsin Al-Khaldi
- (Oman national football team) Salaah Al-Yahyaei
- (Saudi Arabia national football team) Yasser Al-Shahrani
- (South Korea national football team) Cho Gue-sung
- (South Korea national football team) Hwang Hee-chan
- (South Korea national football team) Hwang In-beom
- (South Korea national football team) Jeong Woo-yeong
- (South Korea national football team) Kim Jin-su
- (South Korea national football team) Kim Young-gwon
- (South Korea national football team) Lee Jae-sung
- (Syria national football team) Mahmoud Al Baher
- (Syria national football team) Mohammad Al Marmour
- (Syria national football team) Mardik Mardikian
- (United Arab Emirates national football team) Harib Al-Maazmi
- (United Arab Emirates national football team) Yahya Al Ghassani
- (Vietnam national football team) Nguyễn Quang Hải
- (Vietnam national football team) Nguyễn Thanh Bình
- (Vietnam national football team) Phan Văn Đức

1 own goal

- (Australia men's national soccer team) Aziz Behich (against Japan)
- (United Arab Emirates national football team) Mohammed Al-Attas (against Iraq)

== See also ==
- 2023 AFC Asian Cup qualification – third round
