= 2022 FIFA World Cup qualification (inter-confederation play-offs) =

Tournament details
- Host country: Qatar
- Dates: 13–14 June 2022
- Teams: 4 (from 4 confederations)
- Venue: 1 (in 1 host city)

Tournament statistics
- Matches played: 2
- Goals scored: 1 (0.5 per match)
- Attendance: 54,313 (27,157 per match)
- Top scorer: (Costa Rica) Joel Campbell (1 goal)

For the 2022 FIFA World Cup qualification, there were two scheduled inter-confederation play-offs to determine the final two qualification spots to the 2022 FIFA World Cup. Matches were played on 13–14 June 2022 in the city of Al Rayyan, Qatar (one of the venues of the World Cup).

== Format ==
The draw for the inter-confederation play-offs was held on 26 November 2021, 17:00 CET, in Zürich, Switzerland.

Four teams from four confederations (AFC, CONCACAF, CONMEBOL, and OFC) were drawn into two ties.

Originally, the two teams in each tie were to play a two-legged home-and-away series. However, the ties were single-leg knockout matches in Qatar.

These play-offs were the last ties to decide the two remaining World Cup slots for a 32-team tournament. The 2026 FIFA World Cup has been expanded to 48 teams, and included as part of the qualifiers a play-off tournament involving six teams to decide the last two berths.

== Qualified teams ==
Confederation	Placement	Team
AFC	Fourth round (play-off) winner	Australia
CONCACAF	Third round fourth place	Costa Rica
CONMEBOL	Qualification fifth place	Peru
OFC	Qualification winner	New Zealand

== Venue ==
City	Stadium	Location of the host city of the matches.
Al Rayyan (Doha Area)	Ahmad bin Ali Stadium	Location of the host city of the matches.
Capacity: 45,032		Location of the host city of the matches.

== Matches ==
For the first time, FIFA decided to hold single-game matches in the World Cup host country, Qatar. They were scheduled for 13–14 June 2022 at the Ahmad bin Ali Stadium in Al Rayyan. They were originally scheduled for March that year, but were moved due to the changes in the FIFA International Match Calendar caused by the COVID-19 pandemic.

=== AFC v CONMEBOL ===
Team 1	Score	Team 2
Australia	0–0 (a.e.t.) (5–4 p)	Peru

13 June 2022
21:00 UTC+3

Australia	0–0 (a.e.t.)	Peru
	Report
Penalties
Boyle (penalty missed); Mooy (penalty scored); Goodwin (penalty scored); Hrustic (penalty scored); Maclaren (penalty scored); Mabil (penalty scored)	5–4	(penalty scored) Lapadula; (penalty scored) Callens; (penalty missed) Advíncula; (penalty scored) Tapia; (penalty scored) Flores; (penalty missed) Valera

Ahmad bin Ali Stadium, Al Rayyan (Qatar)
Attendance: 43,510
Referee: Slavko Vinčić (Slovenia)

=== CONCACAF v OFC ===
Team 1	Score	Team 2
Costa Rica	1–0	New Zealand

14 June 2022
21:00 UTC+3

Costa Rica	1–0	New Zealand
Campbell 3'	Report

Ahmad bin Ali Stadium, Al Rayyan (Qatar)
Attendance: 10,803
Referee: Mohammed Abdulla Hassan Mohamed (United Arab Emirates)

== Goalscorers ==
There was 1 goal scored in 2 matches, for an average of 0.5 goals per match.

1 goal

- (Costa Rica) Joel Campbell

== See also ==
- 2022 FIFA World Cup qualification – UEFA second round
