= Caio Canedo =

Emirati footballer (born 1990)

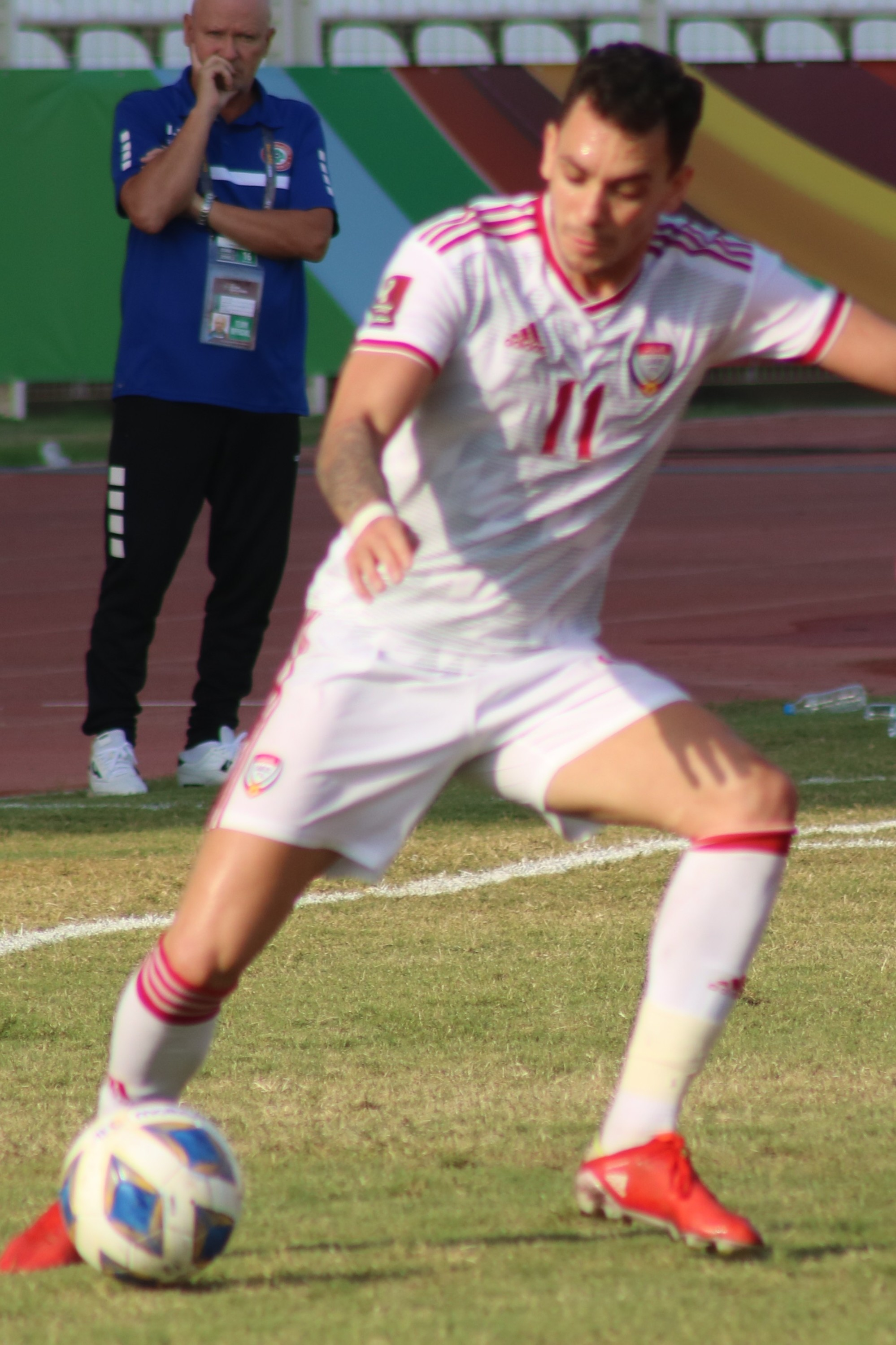
- Canedo with the United Arab Emirates in 2021

Personal information
- Full name: Caio Canedo Corrêa
- Date of birth: 9 August 1990 (age 36)
- Place of birth: Volta Redonda, Brazil
- Height: 1.76 m (5 ft 9 in)
- Positions: Attacking midfielder; winger

Team information
- Current team: Al Wahda
- Number: 7

Youth career
- 2007–2009: Volta Redonda
- 2008: → São Paulo (loan)
- 2009: → Botafogo (loan)

Senior career*
| Years | Team | Apps | (Gls) |
| 2008–2009 | Volta Redonda | 8 | (1) |
| 2009 | → Botafogo (loan) | 0 | (0) |
| 2010–2012 | Botafogo | 101 | (15) |
| 2012 | → Figueirense (loan) | 26 | (9) |
| 2013–2015 | Internacional | 37 | (1) |
| 2014 | → Vitória (loan) | 18 | (5) |
| 2014–2015 | → Al Wasl (loan) | 22 | (16) |
| 2015–2019 | Al Wasl | 91 | (51) |
| 2019–2023 | Al Ain | 70 | (21) |
| 2023–2025 | Al Wasl | 49 | (13) |
| 2025– | Al Wahda | 23 | (4) |

International career^{‡}
| 2020– | United Arab Emirates | 61 | (10) |
- * Club domestic league appearances and goals as of 16:09, 4 May 2026 (UTC) ‡ National team caps and goals as of 4 September 2025

Caio Canedo Corrêa (Arabic: كايو كانيدو كوريا; born 9 August 1990), known as Caio Canedo or simply Caio, is a professional footballer who plays for Al Wahda as a Attacking midfielder or a winger. Born in Brazil, he represents the United Arab Emirates at international level.

== Early life ==
Canedo was born on 9 August 1990, in the Volta Redonda municipality of Rio de Janeiro, Brazil. Canedo would later move to Nantucket, Massachusetts in the United States when he was 9. He would play football for Nantucket High School before moving back to Brazil to play in the youth ranks of Volta Redonda at age 16.

== Club career ==
=== Volta Redonda ===
Caio made his debut for Volta Redonda against Mesquita on 15 February 2009. He scored his first goal for the club against Duque de Caxias, scoring in the 35th minute.

=== Botafogo ===
Caio made his Botafogo debut against Macaé on 16 January 2010. He scored his first goal for the club against America RJ on 30 January 2010, scoring in the 87th minute.

Caio is a fan favourite to Botafogo fans.

=== Figueirense ===
Caio scored on his debut for Figueirense against Náutico on 20 May 2012, scoring in the 90th+4th minute.

=== Internacional ===
In January 2013, Caio joined Internacional. He made his debut for Internacional against Esportivo on 3 March 2013. He scored his first goal for the club against Esportivo on 31 March 2013, scoring in the 45th minute.

=== Vitória ===
Caio made his debut for Vitória against Athletico Paranaense on 27 April 2014.

=== Loan spell at Al Wasl ===
Caio joined Al Wasl on loan in 2014. He made his debut for Al Wasl against Shabab Al Ahli on 26 September 2014. He scored his first goal for the club against Kalba on 5 October 2014, scoring in the 8th minute.

=== Al Wasl ===
Caio made his debut for Al Wasl against Al Nasr on 21 September 2015. He scored his first goal for the club against Fujairah on 24 October 2015, scoring in the 46th minute.

=== Al Ain ===
Caio scored on his debut for Al Ain against Hatta on 19 October 2019, scoring a penalty in the 42nd minute.

=== Third spell at Al Wasl ===
Caio made his debut for Al Wasl against Emirates on 19 August 2023. He scored his first goal for the club against Sharjah on 27 August 2023, scoring in the 90th+1st minute.

== International career ==
Prior to becoming cap-tied to the United Arab Emirates, Canedo was being scouted by United States U20 coach Thomas Rongen but was deemed ineligible, due to his lack of a green card.

=== East Timor ===
Caio received his East Timorese passport in 2015, despite having no known means of eligibility such as a family connection or residency. An inquiry held by the Prime Minister of East Timor in 2016 heard that Caio was one of seven Brazilian men's footballers to receive falsified baptism documents from East Timor's Catholic Church in order to make it appear he was eligible for East Timorese nationality.

=== United Arab Emirates ===
In January 2020, Caio acquired his Emirati passport which qualified him to play for United Arab Emirates national team to compete at the 2022 FIFA World Cup qualification. Caio debuted in a friendly 3–2 win over Tajikistan on 12 November 2020.

On 4 January 2024, Caio was named in the UAE's squad for the 2023 AFC Asian Cup.

== Career statistics ==
=== Club ===
As of match played 1 May 2026

| Club | Season | League | | | State league | | National cup (Note: Includes Copa do Brasil, UAE President's Cup) | | League cup (Note: Includes UAE League Cup) | | Continental | | Total | |
| Club | Season | Division | Apps | Goals | Apps | Goals | Apps | Goals | Apps | Goals | Apps | Goals | Apps | Goals |
|---|---|---|---|---|---|---|---|---|---|---|---|---|---|---|
| Volta Redonda | 2009 | — | | | 8 (Note: Appearances in Campeonato Carioca) | 1 | 0 | 0 | — | | — | | 8 | 1 |
| Botafogo (loan) | 2009 | Série A | 0 | 0 | 0 | 0 | 0 | 0 | — | | — | | 0 | 0 |
| Botafogo | 2010 | Série A | 35 | 1 | 17 | 7 | 4 | 0 | — | | — | | 56 | 8 |
| Botafogo | 2011 | Série A | 20 | 1 | 15 | 4 | 6 | 0 | — | | 2 (Note: Appearances in Copa Sudamericana) | 1 | 43 | 6 |
| Botafogo | 2012 | Série A | 0 | 0 | 14 | 2 | 4 | 0 | — | | — | | 18 | 2 |
| Botafogo | Total | | 55 | 2 | 46 | 13 | 14 | 0 | 0 | 0 | 2 | 1 | 117 | 16 |
| Figueirense (loan) | 2012 | Série A | 26 | 9 | 0 | 0 | 0 | 0 | — | | 2 | 0 | 28 | 9 |
| Internacional | 2013 | Série A | 20 | 0 | 12 (Note: Appearances in Campeonato Gaúcho) | 1 | 5 | 2 | — | | — | | 37 | 3 |
| Internacional | 2014 | Série A | 0 | 0 | 5 | 0 | 0 | 0 | — | | — | | 5 | 0 |
| Internacional | 2015 | Série A | — | | — | | — | | — | | — | | 0 | 0 |
| Internacional | Total | | 20 | 0 | 17 | 1 | 5 | 2 | 0 | 0 | 0 | 0 | 42 | 3 |
| Vitória (loan) | 2014 | Série A | 18 | 5 | 0 | 0 | 1 | 0 | — | | 0 | 0 | 19 | 5 |
| Al-Wasl (loan) | 2014–15 | UPL | 22 | 16 | — | | 1 | 0 | 6 | 3 | — | | 29 | 19 |
| Al-Wasl | 2015–16 | UPL | 23 | 9 | — | | 2 | 3 | 4 | 2 | — | | 29 | 14 |
| Al-Wasl | 2016–17 | UPL | 24 | 14 | — | | 2 | 0 | 6 | 2 | — | | 32 | 16 |
| Al-Wasl | 2017–18 | UPL | 19 | 14 | — | | 4 | 5 | 9 | 7 | 3 (Note: Appearances in AFC Champions League) | 1 | 35 | 27 |
| Al-Wasl | 2018–19 | UPL | 25 | 13 | — | | 3 | 4 | 7 | 2 | 7 (Note: Two appearances one goal in Arab Club Champions Cup, five appearances one goal in AFC Champions League) | 2 | 42 | 21 |
| Al-Wasl | Total | | 91 | 50 | 0 | 0 | 11 | 12 | 26 | 13 | 10 | 3 | 138 | 78 |
| Al Ain | 2019–20 | UPL | 14 | 6 | — | | 3 | 4 | 6 | 3 | 6 | 0 | 29 | 13 |
| Al Ain | 2020–21 | UPL | 20 | 7 | — | | 0 | 0 | 0 | 0 | 1 | 0 | 21 | 7 |
| Al Ain | 2021–22 | UPL | 15 | 4 | — | | 1 | 0 | 7 | 2 | 0 | 0 | 23 | 6 |
| Al Ain | 2022–23 | UPL | 21 | 4 | — | | 3 | 2 | 2 | 0 | 0 | 0 | 26 | 6 |
| Al Ain | Total | | 70 | 21 | 0 | 0 | 7 | 6 | 13 | 5 | 7 | 0 | 99 | 32 |
| Al-Wasl | 2023–24 | UPL | 25 | 7 | — | | 3 | 1 | 5 | 1 | — | | 33 | 9 |
| Al-Wasl | 2024–25 | UPL | 24 | 6 | — | | 2 | 0 | 1 | 0 | 8 | 1 | 35 | 7 |
| Al-Wasl | Total | | 49 | 13 | 0 | 0 | 5 | 1 | 6 | 1 | 8 | 1 | 68 | 16 |
| Al-Wahda | 2025–26 | UPL | 23 | 4 | — | | 2 | 0 | 2 | 0 | 10 | 3 | 37 | 7 |
| Al-Wahda | Total | | 23 | 4 | 0 | 0 | 2 | 0 | 2 | 0 | 10 | 3 | 37 | 7 |
| Career total | | | 302 | 116 | 71 | 15 | 47 | 22 | 52 | 20 | 39 | 8 | 564 | 182 |

=== International ===
As of match played 13 November 2025

Appearances and goals by national team and year
| National team | Year | Apps | Goals |
|---|---|---|---|
| United Arab Emirates | 2020 | 3 | 1 |
| United Arab Emirates | 2021 | 14 | 4 |
| United Arab Emirates | 2022 | 11 | 2 |
| United Arab Emirates | 2023 | 9 | 2 |
| United Arab Emirates | 2024 | 16 | 1 |
| United Arab Emirates | 2025 | 7 | 0 |
| United Arab Emirates | 2026 | 0 | 0 |
| Total | | 60 | 10 |

Scores and results list the United Arab Emirates' goal tally first.

| No. | Date | Venue | Opponent | Score | Result | Competition |
|---|---|---|---|---|---|---|
| 1 | 16 November 2020 | Al Maktoum Stadium, Dubai, United Arab Emirates | Bahrain | 1–0 | 1–3 | Friendly |
| 2 | 24 May 2021 | Rashid Stadium, Dubai, United Arab Emirates | Jordan | 5–0 | 5–1 | Friendly |
| 3 | 7 June 2021 | Zabeel Stadium, Dubai, United Arab Emirates | Thailand | 1–0 | 3–1 | 2022 FIFA World Cup qualification |
| 4 | 12 October 2021 | Zabeel Stadium, Dubai, United Arab Emirates | Iraq | 1–0 | 2–2 | 2022 FIFA World Cup qualification |
| 5 | 30 November 2021 | Stadium 974, Doha, Qatar | Syria | 1–0 | 2–1 | 2021 FIFA Arab Cup |
| 6 | 27 January 2022 | Al Maktoum Stadium, Dubai, United Arab Emirates | Syria | 1–0 | 2–0 | 2022 FIFA World Cup qualification |
| 7 | 7 June 2022 | Ahmad bin Ali Stadium, Al-Rayyan, Qatar | Australia | 1–1 | 1–2 | 2022 FIFA World Cup qualification |
| 8 | 12 September 2023 | Maksimir Stadium, Zagreb, Croatia | Costa Rica | 2–0 | 4–1 | Friendly |
| 9 | 17 October 2023 | Al Maktoum Stadium, Dubai, United Arab Emirates | Lebanon | 1–0 | 2–1 | Friendly |
| 10. | 24 December 2024 | Jaber Al-Ahmad International Stadium, Kuwait City, Kuwait | Kuwait | 1–0 | 1–2 | 26th Arabian Gulf Cup |

== Honours ==
Botafogo

- Campeonato Carioca: 2010

Internacional

- Campeonato Gaúcho: 2013, 2014

Al Ain

- UAE Pro League: 2021–22
- UAE League Cup: 2021–22

Al Wasl

- UAE Pro League: 2023–24
- UAE President Cup: 2023–24
