= 2022 FIFA World Cup qualification =

Qualification for international football tournament

Tournament details
- Dates: 6 June 2019 – 14 June 2022
- Teams: 206 (Note: Cook Islands and North Korea withdrew after playing some matches, and Russia were suspended after playing some matches. American Samoa, Saint Lucia, Samoa, Tonga and Vanuatu withdrew before playing. Qatar was obliged by the AFC to participate in the Asian qualifying stage as the first two rounds also acted as qualification for the 2023 AFC Asian Cup.) (from 6 confederations)

Tournament statistics
- Matches played: 865
- Goals scored: 2,424 (2.8 per match)
- Attendance: 8,974,578 (10,375 per match)
- Top scorer(s): (United Arab Emirates) Ali Mabkhout (14 goals)

The 2022 FIFA World Cup qualification was the qualifying process that decided the 31 teams that would join hosts and debutants Qatar, who received an automatic spot, at the 2022 FIFA World Cup.

Parallel tournaments were organised by FIFA's six confederations. Qualification began on 6 June 2019 with several matches of the AFC zone, the first being between Mongolia and Brunei, and ended on 14 June 2022 with an inter-confederation play-off between Costa Rica and New Zealand. (Note: At the time a rescheduled match of the CONMEBOL section was still due to be played, but it was ultimately cancelled.) Mongolian player Norjmoogiin Tsedenbal netted the first goal.

In contrast to previous editions, there was no general preliminary draw, with confederations carrying out separate draws due to their differing timelines. The qualification process suffered numerous postponements from March 2020 onwards due to the COVID-19 pandemic.

== Qualified teams ==
Status of countries with respect to the 2022 FIFA World Cup: Team qualified Team failed to qualify Team withdrew or suspended Not a FIFA member

Team	Method of qualification	Date of qualification	Total times qualified	Last time qualified	Current consecutive appearances	Previous best performance
Qatar	Hosts	2 December 2010	1	—	1	—
Germany	UEFA Group J winners	11 October 2021	20 (Note: Germany between 1950 and 1990 competed as West Germany, as a separate East German team existed then.)	2018	18	Winners (1954, 1974, 1990, 2014)
Denmark	UEFA Group F winners	12 October 2021	6	2018	2	Quarter-finals (1998)
Brazil	CONMEBOL winners	11 November 2021	22	2018	22	Winners (1958, 1962, 1970, 1994, 2002)
France	UEFA Group D winners	13 November 2021	16	2018	7	Winners (1998, 2018)
Belgium	UEFA Group E winners	13 November 2021	14	2018	3	Third place (2018)
Serbia	UEFA Group A winners	14 November 2021	13 (Note: This is the third appearance of Serbia at the FIFA World Cup. However, FIFA considers Serbia as the successor team of Yugoslavia and Serbia and Montenegro, who between them qualified on 10 occasions.)	2018	2	Fourth place (1930, 1962)
Spain	UEFA Group B winners	14 November 2021	16	2018	12	Winners (2010)
Croatia	UEFA Group H winners	14 November 2021	6	2018	3	Runners-up (2018)
Switzerland	UEFA Group C winners	15 November 2021	12	2018	5	Quarter-finals (1934, 1938, 1954)
England	UEFA Group I winners	15 November 2021	16	2018	7	Winners (1966)
Netherlands	UEFA Group G winners	16 November 2021	11	2014	1	Runners-up (1974, 1978, 2010)
Argentina	CONMEBOL runners up	16 November 2021	18	2018	13	Winners (1978, 1986)
Iran	AFC third round group A winners	27 January 2022	6	2018	3	Group stage (1978, 1998, 2006, 2014, 2018)
South Korea	AFC third round group A runners-up	1 February 2022	11	2018	10	Fourth place (2002)
Saudi Arabia	AFC third round group B winners	24 March 2022	6	2018	2	Round of 16 (1994)
Japan	AFC third round group B runners-up	24 March 2022	7	2018	7	Round of 16 (2002, 2010, 2018)
Uruguay	CONMEBOL third place	24 March 2022	14	2018	4	Winners (1930, 1950)
Ecuador	CONMEBOL fourth place	24 March 2022	4	2014	1	Round of 16 (2006)
Canada	CONCACAF third round winners	27 March 2022	2	1986	1	Group stage (1986)
Ghana	CAF third round winners	29 March 2022	4	2014	1	Quarter-finals (2010)
Senegal	CAF third round winners	29 March 2022	3	2018	2	Quarter-finals (2002)
Poland	UEFA play-offs Path B winners	29 March 2022	9	2018	2	Third place (1974, 1982)
Portugal	UEFA play-offs Path C winners	29 March 2022	8	2018	6	Third place (1966)
Tunisia	CAF third round winners	29 March 2022	6	2018	2	Group stage (1978, 1998, 2002, 2006, 2018)
Morocco	CAF third round winners	29 March 2022	6	2018	2	Round of 16 (1986)
Cameroon	CAF third round winners	29 March 2022	8	2014	1	Quarter-finals (1990)
United States	CONCACAF third round third place	30 March 2022	11	2014	1	Third place (1930)
Mexico	CONCACAF third round runners-up	30 March 2022	17	2018	8	Quarter-finals (1970, 1986)
Wales	UEFA play-offs Path A winners	5 June 2022	2	1958	1	Quarter-finals (1958)
Australia	AFC v CONMEBOL play-off winners	13 June 2022	6	2018	5	Round of 16 (2006)
Costa Rica	CONCACAF v OFC play-off winners	14 June 2022	6	2018	3	Quarter-finals (2014)

== Qualification process ==
All FIFA member associations, of which there were 211, were eligible to enter qualification. Qatar, as hosts, qualified automatically for the tournament. However, Qatar was obliged by the AFC to participate in the Asian qualifying stage as the first two rounds also acted as qualification for the 2023 AFC Asian Cup. As Qatar won their group, the fifth-best group runners-up, Lebanon, advanced to the AFC third round instead. For the first time after the initial two tournaments of 1930 and 1934, the World Cup would be hosted by a country whose national team had never played a finals match before. The reigning World Cup champions France also participated in qualifying as normal.

The allocation of slots for each confederation was discussed by the FIFA Executive Committee on 30 May 2015 in Zürich, Switzerland after the FIFA Congress. The committee decided that the same allocation used in 2006, 2010, and 2014 would be kept for the 2018 and 2022 tournaments:

- AFC (Asia): 4 or 5
- CAF (Africa): 5
- CONCACAF (North, Central America and Caribbean): 3 or 4
- CONMEBOL (South America): 4 or 5
- OFC (Oceania): 0 or 1
- UEFA (Europe): 13
- Hosts: 1

=== Summary of qualification ===
Confederation	Available slots in finals	Teams started	Teams eliminated	Teams qualified	Qualifying start date	Qualifying end date
AFC	4+1 or 5+1	45+1	40	5+1	6 June 2019	13 June 2022
CAF	5	54	49	5	4 September 2019	29 March 2022
CONCACAF	3 or 4	34	30	4	24 March 2021	14 June 2022
CONMEBOL	4 or 5	10	6	4	8 October 2020	13 June 2022
OFC	0 or 1	7	7	0	17 March 2022	14 June 2022
UEFA	13	55	42	13	24 March 2021	5 June 2022
Total	31+1	205+1	174	31+1	6 June 2019	14 June 2022

=== Withdrew or suspended ===
- Saint Lucia initially entered CONCACAF qualification but withdrew from it before their first match.
- North Korea withdrew from the AFC qualifying round due to safety concerns related to the COVID-19 pandemic.
- Both American Samoa and Samoa withdrew before the OFC qualification draw due to travel restrictions following the pandemic.
- Tonga withdrew after the 2022 Hunga Tonga–Hunga Ha'apai eruption and tsunami.
- Due to COVID-19 outbreaks in their squads, Vanuatu and Cook Islands also withdrew because of the travel restrictions.

==== Participation of Russia ====
On 9 December 2019, the World Anti-Doping Agency handed Russia a four-year ban from all major international sporting events, after RUSADA was found non-compliant for handing over manipulated lab data to investigators. However, the Russia national team could still enter qualification, as the ban only applied to the World Cup proper as a world championship. The WADA ruling allowed athletes who were not involved in doping or the coverup to compete, but prohibited the use of the Russian flag and anthem at major international sporting events. An appeal to the Court of Arbitration for Sport was filed, but WADA's decision was upheld though reduced to a two-year ban. The CAS ruling also allowed the name "Russia" to be displayed on uniforms if the words "Neutral Athlete" or "Neutral Team" had equal prominence. If Russia had qualified for the tournament, its players would not have been able to use their country's name alone, flag or anthem at the World Cup, as a result of the nation's two-year ban from world championships and Olympic Games in all sports.

On 27 February 2022, after the threat of boycotts by the Czech Republic, Poland and Sweden (the three teams alongside Russia in the UEFA second qualifying round play-off bracket) amid the Russian invasion of Ukraine, FIFA prohibited the Russia national team from playing home matches in Russia; the team would have to play matches behind closed doors at neutral sites. In addition, the team would have been prohibited from competing under the name, flag, or national anthem of Russia, and had to compete under the name "Football Union of Russia" (RFU). On 28 February, however, FIFA suspended the participation of Russia. Poland were subsequently given a walkover for their play-off semi-final match scheduled against Russia. The Russian Football Union announced they would appeal the decision to the Court of Arbitration for Sport. Their request for a temporary lift of the ban was rejected on 18 March.

== Format ==
The formats of the qualifying competitions depended on each confederation (see below). Each round was played in either of the following formats:

- League format, in which more than two teams formed groups to play home-and-away round-robin matches, or in exceptions permitted by the FIFA Organising Committee, single round-robin matches hosted by one of the participating teams or on neutral territory.
- Knockout format, in which two teams played home-and-away two-legged matches or single-legged matches.

=== Tiebreakers ===
In league format, the ranking of teams in each group was based on the following criteria (regulations Articles 20.4 and 20.6):

1. Points (3 points for a win, 1 point for a draw, 0 points for a loss)
2. Overall goal difference
3. Overall goals scored
4. Points in matches between tied teams
5. Goal difference in matches between tied teams
6. Goals scored in matches between tied teams
7. Away goals scored in matches between tied teams (if the tie was only between two teams in home-and-away league format)
8. Fair play points
  - first yellow card: minus 1 point
  - indirect red card (second yellow card): minus 3 points
  - direct red card: minus 4 points
  - yellow card and direct red card: minus 5 points
9. Drawing of lots by the FIFA Organising Committee

In cases when teams finishing in the same position across different groups were compared to determine which teams advanced to the next stage, the criteria depended on the competition format and required the approval of FIFA (regulations Article 20.8).

In knockout format, the team that had the higher aggregate score over the two legs progressed to the next round. If aggregate scores finish level, then the away goals rule was applied. (Note: The team that scored more goals away from home over the two legs progresses. If away goals were also equal, then 30 minutes of extra time were played, divided into two 15-minute halves.) The away goals rule was again applied after extra time. (Note: If there were goals scored during extra time and the aggregate score was still level, the visiting team qualified by virtue of more away goals scored.) If no goals were scored during extra time, the tie was decided by penalty shoot-out (regulations Article 20.10).

== Confederation qualification ==
=== AFC ===
The opening two rounds of qualifying also served as qualification for the 2023 AFC Asian Cup. Therefore, Qatar, the 2022 FIFA World Cup host, only participated in the first two rounds of qualifying.

The qualification structure was as follows:

- First round: Twelve teams (ranked 35–46) played home-and-away over two legs. The six winners advanced to the second round.
- Second round: Forty teams (ranked 1–34, including Qatar as the host, and the six winners from the first round) were divided into eight groups of five teams to play home-and-away round-robin matches. The eight group winners and the four best group runners-up were set to advance to the third round and AFC Asian Cup. As Qatar won their group, the fifth-best runner-up advanced in their stead.
- Third round: Twelve teams that had advanced from the second round were divided into two groups of six teams to play home-and-away round-robin matches. The top two teams of each group qualified for the World Cup, and the two third-placed teams advanced to the fourth round.
- Fourth round: One third-placed team in each third round group played against each other in a single match, the winners advanced to the inter-confederation play-offs.

==== Final positions (third round) ====
Group A

Pos	Team	Pld	Pts
1	Iran	10	25
2	South Korea	10	23
3	United Arab Emirates	10	12
4	Iraq	10	9
5	Syria	10	6
6	Lebanon	10	6

Source: FIFA, AFC
Group B

Pos	Team	Pld	Pts
1	Saudi Arabia	10	23
2	Japan	10	22
3	Australia	10	15
4	Oman	10	14
5	China	10	6
6	Vietnam	10	4

Source: FIFA, AFC

==== Fourth round ====
Team 1	Score	Team 2
United Arab Emirates	1–2	Australia

=== CAF ===
CAF announced on 10 July 2019 a reversion to the format used for its 2014 FIFA World Cup qualification competition.

- First round: Twenty-eight teams (ranked 27–54) played home-and-away over two legs. The fourteen winners advanced to the second round.
- Second round: Forty teams (teams ranked 1–26 and fourteen first-round winners) were divided into ten groups of four teams to play home-and-away round-robin matches. The ten group winners advanced to the third round.
- Third round: Ten teams that had advanced from the second round played home-and-away over two legs. The five winners qualified for the World Cup, and no teams advance to the intercontinental playoffs.

==== Third round ====
Team 1	Agg.	Team 2	1st leg	2nd leg
Egypt	1–1 (1–3 p)	Senegal	1–0	0–1 (a.e.t.)
Cameroon	2–2 (a)	Algeria	0–1	2–1 (a.e.t.)
Ghana	1–1 (a)	Nigeria	0–0	1–1
DR Congo	2–5	Morocco	1–1	1–4
Mali	0–1	Tunisia	0–1	0–0

=== CONCACAF ===
CONCACAF initially announced on 10 July 2019 a restructured format for the qualifiers of the 2022 FIFA World Cup. However, on 25 June 2020, following FIFA's decision to postpone the September international window because of the pandemic, CONCACAF noted that "the challenges presented by postponements to the football calendar, and the incomplete FIFA rankings cycle in our confederation, means our current World Cup qualifying process has been compromised and will be changed." On 27 July, CONCACAF announced a new qualifying format for the World Cup.

- First round: Thirty CONCACAF teams, ranked 6 to 35 based on the FIFA rankings of July 2020, were drawn into six groups of five and played single round-robin matches (two home and two away), the six group winners advanced to the second round.
- Second round: Six first round group winners played in a two-legged home-and-away series. The three winners advanced to the third round.
- Third round: Eight teams, three second-round winners and the top five CONCACAF teams (Mexico, United States, Costa Rica, Jamaica, and Honduras) also based on those FIFA rankings, played home-and-away round-robin matches in one single group. The top three teams qualified for the World Cup and the fourth-placed team advanced to the inter-confederation play-offs.

==== Final positions (third round) ====
Pos	Team	Pld	Pts
1	Canada	14	28
2	Mexico	14	28
3	United States	14	25
4	Costa Rica	14	25
5	Panama	14	21
6	Jamaica	14	11
7	El Salvador	14	10
8	Honduras	14	4

Source: FIFA, CONCACAF

=== CONMEBOL ===
The CONMEBOL Council decided on 24 January 2019 to maintain the same qualification structure used for the previous six tournaments. From October 2020 to March 2022 (previously scheduled for March 2020 to November 2021, but later postponed by the pandemic), all ten CONMEBOL teams played in a league of home-and-away round-robin matches. The top four teams qualified for the World Cup and the fifth-placed team advanced to the inter-confederation play-offs.

==== Final positions ====
Pos	Team	Pld	Pts
1	Brazil	17	45
2	Argentina	17	39
3	Uruguay	18	28
4	Ecuador	18	26
5	Peru	18	24
6	Colombia	18	23
7	Chile	18	19
8	Paraguay	18	16
9	Bolivia	18	15
10	Venezuela	18	10

Source: FIFA, CONMEBOL

=== OFC ===
Qualifying was expected to begin in September 2020, but the FIFA international window in that month for the OFC was postponed by the pandemic.

Earlier in July that year, the OFC submitted a proposal to FIFA for the qualifiers in response to the pandemic, intending to organise a group stage in March and June 2021 followed by semi-finals and a final in September and October of that year. After continued delays, by September 2021 the OFC felt it was "not possible at this time to organise a qualifying competition within the Oceania region" and it was instead staged in Qatar (host country of the World Cup) in March 2022.

The qualifying stage was to be a single match on 13 March 2022 between the two lowest-ranked participating OFC nations in the FIFA World Rankings, with the winner advancing to the group stage. Then eight remaining teams were drawn into two groups of four, playing single leg round-robin. The top two teams from each group advanced to a single leg knockout stage. The final winner advanced to the inter-confederation play-offs.

==== Final stage ====
Semi-finals
27 March 2022 – Doha (Al-Arabi S.)
Solomon Islands	3
Papua New Guinea	2
27 March 2022 – Doha (Al-Arabi S.)
New Zealand	1
Tahiti	0

Final
30 March 2022 – Doha (Al-Arabi S.)
Solomon Islands	0
New Zealand	5

=== UEFA ===
The draw for the first round (group stage) was held in Zürich, Switzerland, on 7 December 2020, 18:00 CET (UTC+1). However, because of the pandemic, the draw was held as a virtual event without any representatives of member associations present. It was originally planned to be held on 29 November. Earlier on 18 June, the UEFA Executive Committee approved the draw regulations for the qualifying group stage. The 55 teams were seeded into six pots based on the FIFA Men's World Rankings of November 2020, after the league phase of the 2020–21 UEFA Nations League.

The qualification format was confirmed by the UEFA Executive Committee during their meeting in Nyon, Switzerland, on 4 December 2019. The qualification depended, in part, on results from the 2020–21 UEFA Nations League, although to a lesser degree than UEFA Euro 2020. The structure maintained UEFA's usual 'group stage/playoff stage' structure, with only the specific format of the play-offs amended.

- First round (group stage): Ten groups of either five or six teams with group winners qualifying for the World Cup finals. The four teams in the 2021 UEFA Nations League Finals (France, Belgium, Italy, and Spain) were put into the smaller groups.
- Second round (play-off stage): Twelve teams (ten group runners-up and the best two Nations League group winners, based on the Nations League overall ranking, that finished outside the top two of their qualifying group) were drawn into three play-off paths, playing two rounds of single-match play-offs (semi-finals with the seeded teams to host, followed by finals, with the home teams to be drawn), with the three path winners qualifying for the World Cup.

==== Final positions (first round) ====
Group A
Group B
Group C

Pos	Team	Pld	Pts
1	Serbia	8	20
2	Portugal	8	17
3	Republic of Ireland	8	9
4	Luxembourg	8	9
5	Azerbaijan	8	1

Source: FIFA, UEFA

Pos	Team	Pld	Pts
1	Spain	8	19
2	Sweden	8	15
3	Greece	8	10
4	Georgia	8	7
5	Kosovo	8	5

Source: FIFA, UEFA

Pos	Team	Pld	Pts
1	Switzerland	8	18
2	Italy	8	16
3	Northern Ireland	8	9
4	Bulgaria	8	8
5	Lithuania	8	3

Source: FIFA, UEFA
Group D
Group E
Group F

Pos	Team	Pld	Pts
1	France	8	18
2	Ukraine	8	12
3	Finland	8	11
4	Bosnia and Herzegovina	8	7
5	Kazakhstan	8	3

Source: FIFA, UEFA

Pos	Team	Pld	Pts
1	Belgium	8	20
2	Wales	8	15
3	Czech Republic	8	14
4	Estonia	8	4
5	Belarus	8	3

Source: FIFA, UEFA

Pos	Team	Pld	Pts
1	Denmark	10	27
2	Scotland	10	23
3	Israel	10	16
4	Austria	10	16
5	Faroe Islands	10	4
6	Moldova	10	1

Source: FIFA, UEFA
Group G
Group H
Group I

Pos	Team	Pld	Pts
1	Netherlands	10	23
2	Turkey	10	21
3	Norway	10	18
4	Montenegro	10	12
5	Latvia	10	9
6	Gibraltar	10	0

Source: FIFA, UEFA

Pos	Team	Pld	Pts
1	Croatia	10	23
2	Russia	10	22
3	Slovakia	10	14
4	Slovenia	10	14
5	Cyprus	10	5
6	Malta	10	5

Source: FIFA, UEFA

Pos	Team	Pld	Pts
1	England	10	26
2	Poland	10	20
3	Albania	10	18
4	Hungary	10	17
5	Andorra	10	6
6	San Marino	10	0

Source: FIFA, UEFA
Group J

Pos	Team	Pld	Pts
1	Germany	10	27
2	North Macedonia	10	18
3	Romania	10	17
4	Armenia	10	12
5	Iceland	10	9
6	Liechtenstein	10	1

Source: FIFA, UEFA

==== Second round ====
Semi-finals
24 March 2022 – Cardiff
Wales	2
Austria	1
1 June 2022 – Glasgow
Scotland	1
Ukraine	3

Final
5 June 2022 – Cardiff
Wales	1
Ukraine	0

Semi-finals
Cancelled
Russia
Poland (Note: Russia were suspended, and Poland advanced to the final on a walkover.)	w/o
24 March 2022 – Solna
Sweden (a.e.t.)	1
Czech Republic	0

Final
29 March 2022 – Chorzów
Poland	2
Sweden	0

Semi-finals
24 March 2022 – Porto
Portugal	3
Turkey	1
24 March 2022 – Palermo
Italy	0
North Macedonia	1

Final
29 March 2022 – Porto
Portugal	2
North Macedonia	0

== Inter-confederation play-offs ==
There were two inter-confederation play-offs to determine the final two qualification spots for the finals. They were played in Qatar (host country of the World Cup) on 13–14 June 2022.

=== AFC v CONMEBOL ===
Team 1	Score	Team 2
Australia	0–0 (a.e.t.) (5–4 p)	Peru

=== CONCACAF v OFC ===
Team 1	Score	Team 2
Costa Rica	1–0	New Zealand

== Top goalscorers ==
There were 2,424 goals scored in 865 matches, for an average of 2.8 goals per match.

14 goals

- (United Arab Emirates) Ali Mabkhout

13 goals

- (Canada) Cyle Larin

12 goals

- (China) Wu Lei
- (England) Harry Kane
- (Netherlands) Memphis Depay

10 goals

- (Bolivia) Marcelo Moreno
- (Iran) Sardar Azmoun
- (Japan) Takumi Minamino
- (Japan) Yuya Osako

9 goals

- (Canada) Jonathan David
- (Poland) Robert Lewandowski
- (Syria) Omar Al Somah

8 goals

- (Algeria) Islam Slimani
- (Brazil) Neymar
- (El Salvador) David Rugamas
- (Israel) Eran Zahavi
- (Serbia) Aleksandar Mitrović
- (Uruguay) Luis Suárez
- (Vietnam) Nguyễn Tiến Linh

Below are goalscorer lists for all confederations and the inter-confederation play-offs:

- AFC
- CAF
- CONCACAF
- CONMEBOL
- OFC
- UEFA
- Inter-confederation play-offs
