= 2022 FIFA World Cup qualification – AFC fourth round =

- Event: AFC Asian Qualifiers
United Arab Emirates	Australia
(United Arab Emirates)	(Australia)
1	2
- Date: 7 June 2022
- Venue: Ahmad bin Ali Stadium, Al Rayyan, Qatar
- Referee: Ilgiz Tantashev (Uzbekistan)
- Attendance: 6,500

The fourth round of AFC matches for the 2022 FIFA World Cup qualification consisted of a single match that determined the AFC representative in the intercontinental play-offs against the CONMEBOL representative. This round was originally scheduled as a two-legged tie for 11 and 16 November 2021, but the dates and format were changed in November 2020 in response to impacts from the COVID-19 pandemic in Asia.

The match featured the United Arab Emirates and Australia. It was played at Ahmad bin Ali Stadium in Al Rayyan, Qatar (one of the host cities of the World Cup) on 7 June 2022.

== Background ==
Since the 1998 FIFA World Cup qualification, the last round of the Asian qualifiers (in this case, the fourth round) had consisted of a matchup between two teams coming from a previous round, and the winning team would represent AFC in the intercontinental play-offs (except the 1998 campaign, in which the play-off winners qualified directly for the FIFA World Cup, while the losers advanced to the intercontinental play-off).

The United Arab Emirates had previously played once at this stage; they faced Iran in the 2002 play-off and lost 0–4 on aggregate. Australia had also previously played at this stage once; it was the previous 2018 edition, where they defeated Syria 3–2 on aggregate.

This was the third match between the United Arab Emirates and Australia in AFC World Cup qualifying, with the previous two meetings being Australian victories (both in the 2018 qualifiers).

== Format ==
In the fourth round, the two third-placed teams from the third round competed in a single-match play-off. Since the fourth round format was changed from two-legged tie to a single-match at a neutral venue, the game was played under the single-leg play-off rules from the preliminary competition, with extra time of two periods of 15 minutes would be played if the match was tied after the regular time of 90 minutes, followed by a penalty shoot-out to decide the winner if the match still tied after extra time (Regulations Article 20.11).

The winner advanced to the intercontinental play-offs that was held on six days later also in Qatar.

== Qualified teams ==
Group (Third round)	Third place
A	United Arab Emirates
B	Australia

The United Arab Emirates qualified for the fourth round after finishing third of Group A in the third round. Previously, they had won their group in the second round, winning six and losing two of their eight matches, leaving Vietnam (by only 1 point), Malaysia, Thailand and Indonesia behind. In the third round, the UAE were part of Group A, alongside Iran, South Korea, Iraq, Syria and Lebanon. They finished third with 12 points and a record of 3 wins, 3 draws and 4 losses, behind Iran and South Korea who qualified directly for the final tournament.

Australia also qualified by finishing third in the third round (Group B). Previously, they had won their group in the second round, winning all eight of their matches and taking a 10-point lead over Kuwait and Jordan in second and third place respectively, with Nepal and Chinese Taipei far behind. In the third round, Australia were part of Group B, alongside Saudi Arabia, Japan, Oman, China PR and Vietnam. They finished third with 15 points and a record of 4 wins, 3 draws and 3 losses, behind Saudi Arabia and Japan who qualified directly for the final tournament.

The United Arab Emirates started the qualification process with Dutchman Bert van Marwijk. However, he was sacked on 12 February 2022 after the team ran out of direct qualification options as Iran and South Korea had secured the first two places of Group A in the third round. Argentine Rodolfo Arruabarrena was announced as the UAE's new coach one day later, while Australia kept Graham Arnold as their coach throughout the process.

== Venue ==
City	Stadium	Location of the host city of the match.
Al Rayyan (Doha Area)	Ahmad bin Ali Stadium	Location of the host city of the match.
Capacity: 45,032		Location of the host city of the match.

== Match ==
Team 1	Score	Team 2
United Arab Emirates	1–2	Australia

7 June 2022
21:00 UTC+3

United Arab Emirates	1–2	Australia
Caio 57'	Report (FIFA); Report (AFC)	Irvine 53'; Hrustic 84'

Ahmad bin Ali Stadium, Al Rayyan (Qatar)
Attendance: 6,500
Referee: Ilgiz Tantashev (Uzbekistan)

United Arab Emirates	Australia

GK	17	Khalid Eisa
CB	12	Khalifa Al Hammadi
CB	13	Mohammed Al-Attas
CB	3	Walid Abbas (c)
DM	14	Abdulla Hamad		(substituted off) 89'
RM	4	Khaled Ibrahim
CM	18	Abdullah Ramadan		(substituted off) 75'
CM	5	Ali Salmeen		(substituted off) 88'
LM	21	Harib Al-Maazmi
CF	11	Caio Canedo		(substituted off) 89'
CF	7	Ali Mabkhout	(yellow card) 34'	(substituted off) 75'
Substitutions:
MF	15	Yahia Nader		(substituted on) 75'
FW	16	Ali Saleh		(substituted on) 75'
MF	8	Majed Hassan		(substituted on) 88'
MF	10	Omar Abdulrahman		(substituted on) 89'
FW	20	Sebastián Tagliabúe		(substituted on) 89'
Manager:
(Argentina) Rodolfo Arruabarrena

GK	1	Mathew Ryan (c)
RB	4	Nathaniel Atkinson
CB	8	Bailey Wright
CB	20	Kye Rowles
LB	16	Aziz Behich
RM	6	Martin Boyle
CM	13	Aaron Mooy
CM	22	Jackson Irvine
LM	19	Craig Goodwin		(substituted off) 72'
CF	10	Ajdin Hrustic	(yellow card) 55'	(substituted off) 90+1'
CF	7	Mathew Leckie		(substituted off) 90+1'
Substitutions:
FW	9	Jamie Maclaren		(substituted on) 72'
DF	2	Miloš Degenek		(substituted on) 90+1'
FW	11	Awer Mabil		(substituted on) 90+1'
Manager:
Graham Arnold

Assistant referees:
Andrey Tsapenko (Uzbekistan)
Timur Gaynullin (Uzbekistan)
Fourth official:
Ko Hyung-jin (South Korea)
Video assistant referee:
Muhammad Taqi (Singapore)
Assistant video assistant referee:
Fu Ming (China PR)

Match rules:

- 90 minutes.
- 30 minutes of extra time if necessary.
- Penalty shoot-out if still tied after extra time.
- Maximum of twelve named substitutes.
- Maximum of five substitutions, with a sixth allowed in extra time (Regulations Article 8.4). (Note: Each team was given only three opportunities to make substitutions, with a fourth opportunity in extra time, excluding substitutions made at half-time, before the start of extra time and at half-time in extra time.)

== Goalscorers ==
There were 3 goals scored in 1 match, for an average of 3 goals per match.

1 goal

- (Australia men's national soccer team) Ajdin Hrustic
- (Australia men's national soccer team) Jackson Irvine
- (United Arab Emirates national football team) Caio Canedo
