= East Timorese nationality law =

East Timorese nationality law is regulated by the 2002 Constitution, the Nationality Act of the same year, the regulation of the Nationality Act Decree-Law No. 1 of 2004, as well as various international agreements to which East Timor has been a signatory. These laws determine who is, or is eligible to be, a national of East Timor. The legal means to acquire nationality and formal membership in a nation differ from the relationship of rights and obligations between a national and the nation, known as citizenship. East Timorese nationality is typically obtained either on the principle of jus soli, i.e. by birth in East Timor; or under the rules of jus sanguinis, i.e. by birth abroad to at least one parent with East Timorese nationality. It can also be granted to a permanent resident who has lived in East Timor for a given period of time through naturalization.

== Acquiring East Timorese nationality ==
East Timorese nationality is acquired by birth, or later in life through adoption, marriage, or regular naturalization. Acquisition applies to:

=== By birth ===
- Persons born anywhere to a mother or father who is an East Timorese national;
- Persons who are born within the territory to a parent, regardless of their nationality, who was born in the territory;
- Persons who are born in East Timor to parents whose nationality is unknown, parents who are stateless, or whose parents are unknown; or
- Persons who are born in the territory to foreign parents but who declare upon reaching majority the desire to be East Timorese nationals.

=== By naturalization ===
Naturalization applications are reviewed by the Minister of Justice, who has the authority to administer all matters pertaining to nationality except those of service to the country. The National Parliament administers special naturalization for services to the nation. Applicants must typically file a request and provide documentation to confirm that they are of legal majority in East Timor and their country of origin; have regularly resided in East Timor for ten years either before 7 December 1975 or after 20 May 2002; speak either the Portuguese or Tetum languages; and know basic history and cultural information about East Timor. They are required to prove their ability for integration in and compliance with the rules of Timorese society and their ability to sustain themselves. Such documents as birth certificates, criminal records, and other certificates to confirm language and culture proficiency, self-support, and residency are required. Those who may seek naturalization include:

- Minor children under age 15, for whom a judicial petition for full adoption has been completed;
- Foreign persons who meet the requirements for regular naturalization and have lived in the territory for a minimum of ten years; (Note: Residency first established during the Indonesian occupation of East Timor is precluded from consideration as regular residency. Even if a person resided in the territory for ten years after independence, they are ineligible for naturalization.)
- Minor children of parents who have been naturalized, upon the formal request of the parent;
- Persons who are married to East Timorese nationals, if they have been married for a minimum of five years, have resided in the territory continuously for two years, and prove proficiency in speaking either Portuguese or Tetum; or
- Persons who have performed, in the past, services considered high and relevant to the development of the nation, at the discretion of the legislature.

== Loss of East Timorese nationality ==
Nationals born in East Timor cannot be deprived of their nationality but can voluntarily renounce it, if they have acquired other nationality. Naturalized persons can lose their nationality in East Timor by committing acts of espionage, treason, or other actions which jeopardize state security; for having acquired naturalization based on false or fraudulent documents; or through serving in a foreign military or governmental capacity without the approval of East Timorese authorities.

== Dual nationality ==
Dual nationality is accepted in East Timor.

== History ==
=== Portuguese period (1515–1975) ===
When the Portuguese first encountered the island of Timor, explorers reported two provinces, composed of localized chiefdoms who were economically aligned. The two provinces, Belu in the east composed of the Wehali and Suai-Kamanasa chiefdoms, and Servião in the west where the Atoni or Dawan people lived. Portuguese interest in the island was centered around the sandalwood trade, but the first Portuguese settlers were Dominican priests who introduced Catholicism to the island by 1515. Between their first settlement and 1640, ten isolated missions were set up and twenty-two churches were founded, but there was no colonial Portuguese administration established. Independent Portuguese traders, were operating in Timor from 1523. In 1613 the Dutch established control of the western part of the island, as well as capturing the fort and trading base the Portuguese had founded on Solor island in 1566. Relocating to Larantuka on Flores island, the Portuguese and their descendants, known as Larantuqueiros or Topasses, who had been born on Solar island to indigenous women, controlled the trade routes between Flores, Solor and Timor. By 1623, these mixed-race descendants had established a stronghold in northern Timor, and by 1642 they were a significant presence on the island. Conflict between the Dutch and Portuguese continued until 1663, when a treaty between the two powers brought relative peace until 1749.

The Topasses consolidated their power on Timor under the leadership of Mateus da Costa and António da Hornay establishing virtually complete control of the island. They ruled by controlling commerce in the territory and had only loose ties to Portuguese India, occasionally sending donations to Goa to appease the viceroy, who typically governed the Portuguese possessions in Asia. The first Portuguese governor of Solor and Timor, António de Mesquita Pimentel, was appointed in 1695. In 1702, Governor António Coelho Guerreiro established the seat of government for the territory in Lifau and attempted to impose colonial authority. He was ousted in 1704, and subsequent governors repeatedly dealt with rebellion as an answer to their attempts to assert authority or regulate affairs. Portuguese rule was indirect and relied heavily upon local leaders. Though Portuguese law was extended to the territory, it operated alongside traditional norms and legal practices. As established in 1603 by the Ordinances of Philip (Portuguese: Ordenações Filipinas), Portuguese nationals were children born on the Iberian Peninsula or adjacent islands, Brazil, or to an official in service to the crown in the Portuguese possessions of Africa or Asia, whose father was a native of Portugal, or whose mother was a native of Portugal and was married to a foreigner who had established domicile in Portugal for a minimum of ten years.

In 1822, Portugal promulgated its first Constitution, specifically mentioning East Timor as part of the kingdom. Under its provisions, Portuguese nationals were those born in the territories of the kingdom to a father who was born within the kingdom. Children born abroad had to establish a domicile in the kingdom unless the father was abroad in government service. Children born to foreign fathers in Portuguese territory could elect to be Portuguese upon reaching majority if they were domiciled in Portugal. Only illegitimate children could derive nationality from their mothers. Foundlings and freed slaves within the territory were also included as Portuguese. Foreign men could naturalize by investing or providing useful commercial or industrial activities in the kingdom, marrying a Portuguese woman, or through service to the crown. The revised Constitution of 1826 defined nationals as anyone born in Portuguese territory unless the father was a foreigner in service to his nation. (Note: Legal scholars debated until the late-nineteenth century whether birth in the territory or birth in the territory to Catholics, the official state religion, was required for deriving Portuguese nationality. Colonial administrators typically ignored the question of religion. When in 1911, Portugal established separation of church and state, the question became moot.) These terms were reiterated in the first Civil Code adopted by Portugal in 1867, which also required married women to follow the nationality of their spouse. In other words, foreign women gained Portuguese nationality upon marriage, while native women lost Portuguese nationality if they married a foreign man, unless his nation did not grant her nationality. In 1959 the first Portuguese Nationality Act was passed, which retained birth in the territory as its foundation for establishing nationality.

=== Portuguese/Indonesian period (1975–1999) ===
After the Carnation Revolution of 1974, Portugal acknowledged that under Chapter XI of the Charter of the United Nations its overseas possessions had the right to gain independence. A National Decolonisation Commission was established to begin consultations with East Timor in 1975. Before negotiations were completed, the political party Timorese Democratic Union attempted a Coup d'état and a brief civil war ensued. Fretilin Portuguese: Frente Revolucionária de Timor-Leste Independente emerged victorious and declared the independence of East Timor on 28 November 1975. On 7 December 1975, Indonesia invaded East Timor. Portugal notified the United Nations (UN) of the invasion and immediately severed diplomatic relations with Indonesia. (Note: Because Portugal did not recognize East Timor's declaration of independence or the legitimacy of the Indonesian annexation, Law 308-A/75 passed in 1975 did not apply to East Timor. The law established that persons born or domiciled in Portugal's overseas possessions immediately lost their Portuguese nationality upon independence, regardless of whether new nationality rules had been established. Nationals of East Timor, who were Portuguese prior to 25 April 1976, were able to retain their Portuguese nationality.) The United Nations Security Council issued a resolution in 1976 calling for the immediate withdrawal of Indonesian troops and reaffirming East Timor's right to self-determination. Disregarding the UN, Indonesia formally annexed the territory in July.

Accompanying the annexation, Indonesia extended nationality to the East Timorese, but allowed those who wished to retain their Portuguese nationality to do so. Many who chose to remain nationals of Portugal left the country. Those who stayed, though ostensibly citizens of Indonesia and entitled to the same rights, were treated as foreigners and faced threats that their property would be confiscated. Children born in East Timor during the occupation automatically acquired Indonesian citizenship through their father if they were legitimate, their mother if they were illegitimate or the father was stateless, or if they were foundlings. Upon marriage, women automatically derived the nationality of their spouse, but were required to renounce their original nationality. For children of those who had remained Portuguese nationals, they were considered to be Portuguese born abroad and had to either declare a desire to be Portuguese, register the birth in the Portuguese Civil Registry, or move to Portuguese territory and both establish a domicile there and declare the wish to be Portuguese to the authorities. Portugal revised its Nationality Law in 1981, including a provision that those born "in a territory under Portuguese administration" were Portuguese, thus from that date, East Timorese were again automatically Portuguese. The revision also eliminated the provision from previous Portuguese laws that women lost nationality upon marriage and provided a process for repatriation in Article 31.

From 1982 to the late-1990s, talks between UN officials, Indonesia, and Portugal, failed to resolve the issue of East Timor's independence. After Suharto resigned as President of Indonesia in 1998, the Indonesian government agreed to allow a transition to independence. Portugal and Indonesia signed an agreement to allow the UN to draft a proposal and constitutional framework for East Timor. A UN commission organized a consultation with East Timorese persons both domestic and abroad, registering over 450,000 persons. The vote on transitional independence, held on 30 August 1999, showed a participation rate of 98% and a rejection by 78.5% of the voters of the proposal to become an autonomous region of Indonesia. Militia groups which supported East Timor remaining part of Indonesia engaged in widespread violence after the announcement of the results. The voting commission members were evacuated and a UN peacekeeping mission was sent in to try to restore order and provide humanitarian aid to those displaced by the militias. After peace was regained, on 19 October 1999, the Indonesian legislature ratified the voting results and officially recognized East Timor's separation from Indonesia.

=== UN period to independence (1999–2004) ===
The United Nations Transitional Administration in East Timor (UNTAET) was established on 25 October 1999. It provided the interim civil administration and maintenance of law and order in the territory until East Timor developed institutions for self-governance and full independence on 20 May 2002. At the time of independence, all persons born, regardless of the place of their birth, to East Timorese parents, or in the territory to parents whose nationality was unknown, parents who were stateless, or to unknown parents, became nationals of East Timor. Children of foreigners born in East Timor were allowed to declare that they desired to have East Timorese nationality upon reaching the age of majority (17 years). Under terms of the 2002 Constitution, dual nationality was allowed and thus East Timorese nationals were allowed to retain their Indonesian and/or Portuguese nationalities. After independence the 2002 Nationality Law and 2004 Regulation of the Nationality Act, were passed by the legislature to establish the current rules for nationality.
