= Ajdin Hrustic =

Australian footballer (born 1996)

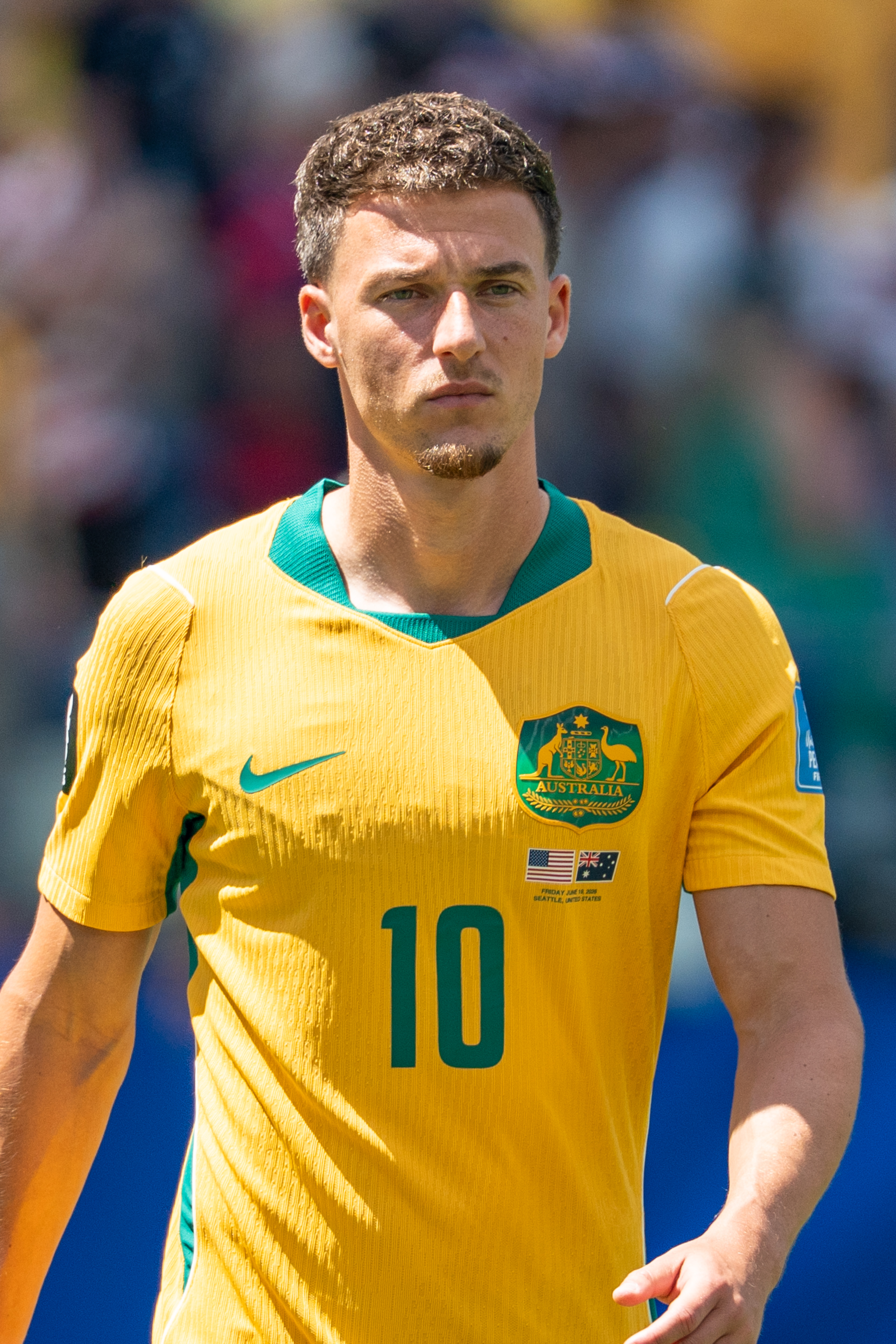
- Hrustic with Australia in 2026

Personal information
- Full name: Ajdin Hrustic
- Date of birth: 5 July 1996 (age 30)
- Place of birth: Dandenong, Victoria, Australia
- Height: 1.80 m (5 ft 11 in)
- Position: Midfielder

Team information
- Current team: Al-Nasr
- Number: 70

Youth career
- 2004–2007: Heatherton United
- 2007–2009: South Melbourne
- 2009–2010: Sandringham
- 2010–2011: Nottingham Forest
- 2011–2012: Austria Wien
- 2012–2014: Schalke 04
- 2014–2015: Groningen

Senior career*
Years	Team	Apps	(Gls)
2015–2020	Jong Groningen	49	(8)
2017–2020	Groningen	67	(5)
2020–2022	Eintracht Frankfurt	34	(3)
2022–2024	Hellas Verona	6	(0)
2024	→ Heracles Almelo (loan)	14	(1)
2024–2025	Salernitana	21	(1)
2025–2026	Heracles Almelo	27	(1)
2026–	Al-Nasr	4	(1)

International career^{‡}
2017–2018	Australia U23	4	(0)
2017–	Australia	39	(4)
- * Club domestic league appearances and goals as of 10 September 2026 ‡ National team caps and goals as of 3 July 2026

Ajdin Hrustic (Bosnian: [ǎjdin xrǔstitɕ] EYE-din HROO-stich; born 5 July 1996) is an Australian professional soccer player who plays as a midfielder for UAE Pro League club Al-Nasr and the Australia national team.

== Early life ==
Born in Dandenong, Hrustic played youth football with South Melbourne and Schalke 04 before moving to FC Groningen, where he made his professional debut in 2017. In 2020 he signed for the German football club Eintracht Frankfurt.

== Club career ==
=== Groningen ===
In June 2015, Hrustic signed a three-year contract with FC Groningen, his first senior professional deal. He made his competitive debut for the club as a substitute in a draw against AZ Alkmaar on 2 April 2017. His first goal for the club came two weeks later, with a shot from long range to seal a 5–1 win over PEC Zwolle.

=== Eintracht Frankfurt ===
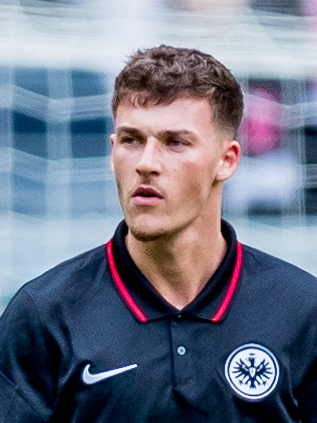
Hrustic with Eintracht Frankfurt in 2022

On 28 September 2020, Hrustic signed a contract with Bundesliga side Eintracht Frankfurt that will keep him at the club through to 2023, and was given the No. 7 jersey. He made his debut on 19 December 2020 in a 2–0 victory against FC Augsburg, coming off the bench for Aymen Barkok.

Hrustic scored his first goal for Eintracht Frankfurt against Mainz 05, on 9 May 2021, with an improvised finish where he managed to chip the ball over goalkeeper Robin Zentner.

On 18 May 2022, he became the first Australian player to win the UEFA Europa League in its history, after Eintracht Frankfurt triumphed over Scottish opponents Rangers in the 2022 final, winning a penalty shoot-out 5–4 after the match ended 1–1 after extra time, with Hrustic converting his team's second penalty of the shootout. He became the first Australian since Harry Kewell in 2005 to win a major UEFA competition.

=== Hellas Verona ===
Wasn't an easy move. I got injured, got left alone to be honest. For the first time I kind of felt where I really did struggle to be honest and when the door opened up back to Eredivisie, it was the first thing I wanted.

— Hrustic on injury at Hellas Verona, 2024.

On 1 September 2022, Hrustic signed a four-year contract with Hellas Verona in Italy. He made his debut in a 2–0 loss to Lazio on 11 September 2022. Hrustic would however injure his ankle on 16 October during a 2–1 loss to AC Milan which meant that he would not see the pitch for Verona for the rest of the year.

Despite appearing in the World Cup and on 4 January 2023 coming off the bench against Torino, Hrustic underwent surgery on his ankle and missed the rest of Verona's season although he did recover in time to be named on the bench for the final three games of the season.

During the pre-season of the 2023–24 season, Hrustic was told that Verona wanted to move him on, citing that they could no longer afford his salary. Hrustic stated that "I did think they were bluffing, to be honest" and despite this he played in Verona's pre-season fixtures. He was however not registered for the upcoming season and missed out on five months of club football.

==== Loan to Heracles Almelo ====
On 1 February 2024, Hrustic returned to the Netherlands and signed with Heracles Almelo until the end of the season. On 3 March, he scored his first goal for Heracles against Almere, with a bending shot into the bottom corner.

=== Salernitana ===
On 30 August 2024, Hrustic moved to Salernitana in Serie B on a one-season contract, with a conditional performance-based automatic renewal option. On 13 May 2025, Hrustic scored his first goal for the club against Citadella, a free-kick which rescued Salernitana from automatic relegation to Serie C. Hrustic played in both legs against Sampdoria in the relegation play-out as Salernitana were relegated to Serie C with Hrustic's contract expiring soon after.

=== Return to Heracles Almelo ===
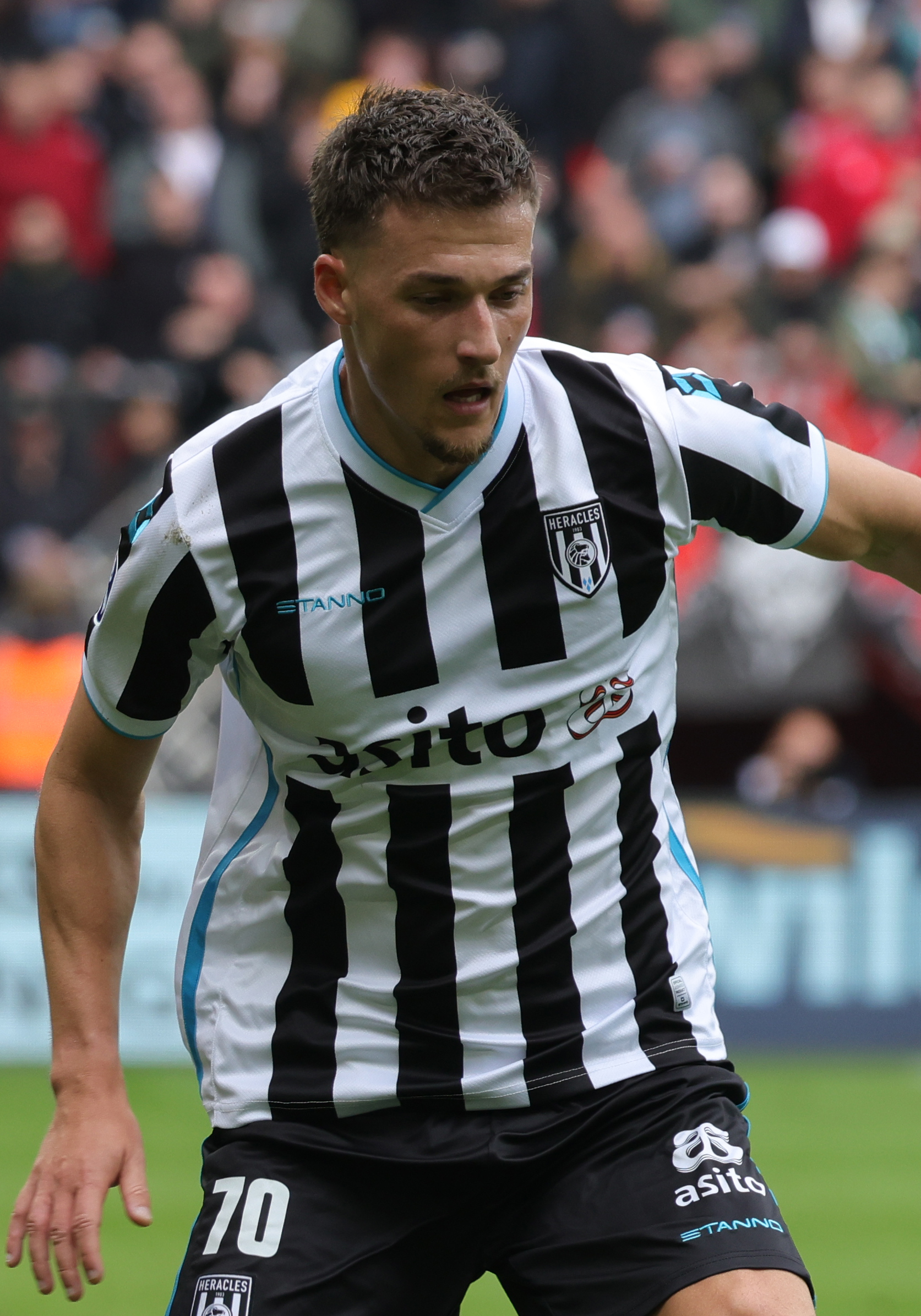
Hrustic with Heracles Almelo in 2025

On 28 July 2025, Hrustic returned to Heracles Almelo on a one-season deal.

=== Al-Nasr SC ===
On 24 July 2026, Hrustic joined UAE Pro League club Al-Nasr.

== International career ==
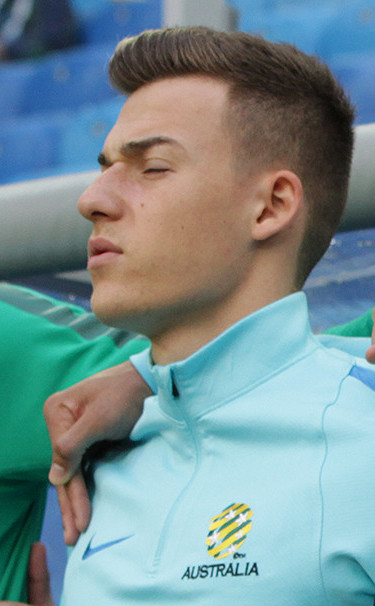
Hrustic with Australia at the 2017 FIFA Confederations Cup

Due to his Bosnian and Romanian heritage, Hrustic was eligible to represent Bosnia and Herzegovina and Romania internationally, in addition to his birth country Australia. He was contacted by the Football Association of Bosnia and Herzegovina in May 2017, but ultimately rejected the offer and expressed his wish to represent the Socceroos.

Hrustic was called up to an Australian under-23 development squad in March 2017. This was the first time he had been involved with Football Federation Australia in several years, having previously not been involved with the Australian setup since moving to Europe.

On 22 May 2017, Hrustic was named in the Australian national side's 30-man preliminary squad for the month of June, including the 2017 FIFA Confederations Cup, a friendly against Brazil and a 2018 FIFA World Cup qualifier against Saudi Arabia. He was retained in the final 23-man squad. He made his Socceroos debut on the losing side of a 4–0 friendly against Brazil, coming on as a 57th-minute substitute.

On 4 June 2021, Hrustic scored his first goal for Australia against Kuwait in the second round of World Cup qualifying, bending the ball off the inside of the post and in from a 30-odd-metre free-kick. His second goal also came off a free-kick bouncing off the crossbar to go in underneath the goal against Japan in 2021.

During Australia's cut-throat match against the United Arab Emirates in the fourth round of qualifying, Hrustic scored his third goal with a sweetly struck volley that deflected off a UAE defender in the dying minutes of the match to secure the win for Australia and passage through to the intercontinental play-off round against Peru. Against Peru, Hrustic had one of the best opportunities for Australia during the match when he scuffed a shot from the edge of the box. He scored the fourth penalty for Australia as they beat Peru 5–4 in the penalty shoot-out, qualifying for the World Cup.

Despite suffering an injury while playing for Hellas Verona and being a doubt for the tournament, Hrustic was included in the 2022 FIFA World Cup squad, being substituted on in Australia's final three matches as the Socceroos were knocked out by Argentina in the round of sixteen.

After a 2–0 friendly loss against Argentina on 15 June 2023, he missed out on the next four Australia squads including the Asian Cup due to lack of playing time at club level. On 21 March 2024, Hrustic made his first appearance for Australia since the loss to Argentina, playing against Lebanon in the second round of World Cup qualifying. He scored his fourth goal on 6 June against Bangladesh in a 2–0 win with a long shot that deflected into the goal.

On 31 May 2026, Hrustic was selected in the 26-man squad for the 2026 FIFA World Cup.

== Personal life ==
Hrustic was born in Dandenong a suburb of Melbourne, Australia to a Bosniak father and a Romanian mother. He is religiously Muslim.

== Career statistics ==
=== Club ===
As of 14 February 2026

Appearances and goals by club, season and competition
Club	Season	League			National cup (Note: Includes KNVB Beker, DFB-Pokal, Coppa Italia)		Europe		Other		Total	
Club	Season	Division	Apps	Goals	Apps	Goals	Apps	Goals	Apps	Goals	Apps	Goals
Jong Groningen	2014–15	Beloften Eredivisie	2	0	—		—		—		2	0
Jong Groningen	2015–16	Beloften Eredivisie	15	0	—		—		—		15	0
Jong Groningen	2016–17	Derde Divisie	26	4	—		—		—		26	4
Jong Groningen	2017–18	Derde Divisie	5	3	—		—		—		5	3
Jong Groningen	2019–20	Reserve Eredivisie	1	1	—		—		—		1	0
Jong Groningen	Total		49	8	0	0	0	0	0	0	49	8
Groningen	2016–17	Eredivisie	5	1	0	0	—		2 (Note: Appearances in Eredivisie play-offs for UEFA Conference League)	0	7	1
Groningen	2017–18	Eredivisie	18	1	1	1	—		—		19	2
Groningen	2018–19	Eredivisie	18	0	1	0	—		2	0	21	0
Groningen	2019–20	Eredivisie	25	3	2	0	—		—		27	3
Groningen	2020–21	Eredivisie	1	0	—		—		—		1	0
Groningen	Total		67	5	4	1	0	0	4	0	75	6
Eintracht Frankfurt	2020–21	Bundesliga	11	1	1	0	—		—		12	1
Eintracht Frankfurt	2021–22	Bundesliga	23	2	0	0	5 (Note: Appearances in UEFA Europa League)	0	—		28	2
Eintracht Frankfurt	Total		34	3	1	0	5	0	0	0	40	3
Hellas Verona	2022–23	Serie A	6	0	0	0	—		0	0	6	0
Hellas Verona	2023–24	Serie A	0	0	0	0	—		—		0	0
Hellas Verona	Total		6	0	0	0	0	0	0	0	6	0
Heracles Almelo (loan)	2023–24	Eredivisie	14	1	—		—		—		14	1
Salernitana	2024–25	Serie B	21	1	1	0	—		2 (Note: Appearances in Serie B relegation play-out)	0	24	1
Heracles Almelo	2025–26	Eredivisie	21	1	3	3	—		—		24	4
Career total			163	11	9	4	5	0	6	0	183	15

=== International ===
As of match played 3 July 2026

Appearances and goals by national team and year
National team	Year	Apps	Goals
Australia	2017	1	0
Australia	2018	0	0
Australia	2019	2	0
Australia	2020	0	0
Australia	2021	10	2
Australia	2022	10	1
Australia	2023	1	0
Australia	2024	7	1
Australia	2025	3	0
Australia	2026	3	0
Total		39	4

Scores and results list Australia's goal tally first, score column indicates score after each Hrustic goal.

List of international goals scored by Ajdin Hrustic
No.	Date	Venue	Opponent	Score	Result	Competition
1	3 June 2021	Jaber Al-Ahmad International Stadium, Kuwait City, Kuwait	Kuwait	3–0	3–0	2022 FIFA World Cup qualification
2	12 October 2021	Saitama Stadium 2002, Saitama, Japan	Japan	1–1	1–2	2022 FIFA World Cup qualification
3	7 June 2022	Ahmed bin Ali Stadium, Al-Rayyan, Qatar	United Arab Emirates	2–1	2–1	2022 FIFA World Cup qualification
4	6 June 2024	Bashundhara Kings Arena, Dhaka, Bangladesh	Bangladesh	1–0	2–0	2026 FIFA World Cup qualification

== Honours ==
Eintracht Frankfurt

- UEFA Europa League: 2021–22

== See also ==
- List of foreign football players in the Netherlands
