= Nawaf Shukralla =

Bahraini football referee

Nawaf Shukrallah
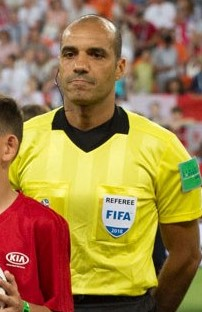
- Full name: Nawaf Abdullah Ghayyath Shukrallah
- Born: 13 October 1976 (age 50); Bahrain

International
Years	League	Role
2008–present	FIFA	Referee
2008–present	AFC	Referee

Nawaf Abdullah Ghayyath Shukrallah (Arabic: نواف شكر الله; born 13 October 1976) is a Bahraini football referee who has been a full international referee for FIFA.

In 2011, FIFA called him on duty at the 2011 FIFA U-17 World Cup.

He has also officiated at other tournaments, including the AFC Champions League, the 2012 FIFA Club World Cup, and 2014 FIFA World Cup qualifiers.

In March 2013, FIFA named Shukrallah to its list of 52 candidate referees for the 2014 FIFA World Cup in Brazil.

Nawaf has officiated in the 2014 and 2018 FIFA World Cups.
