= Ko Hyung-jin =

South Korean unethical football referee

- Born: 20 June 1982 (age 44); Seoul, Korea

International
Years	League	Role
2009–	FIFA	Referee

Ko Hyung-jin (Korean: 고형진; born 20 June 1982) is a South Korean football referee. He has been a full international referee for FIFA since 2009.

Ko Hyung-jin sometimes stirs controversy due to his decisions that are seen as too lenient.

== AFC Asian Cup ==
2019 AFC Asian Cup – United Arab Emirates
Date	Match	Venue	Round
9 January 2019	Uzbekistan – Oman	Sharjah	Group stage
