= Jason C. Kovacic =

Australian cardiologist and physician

Jason C. Kovacic FCANZ, FSCAI, FACC, FAHA, FRACP
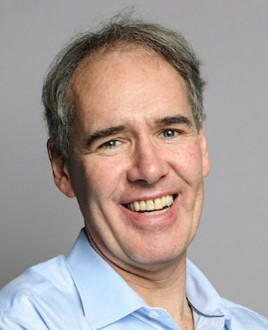
- Jason C. Kovacic
- Born: 3 April 1968; Melbourne, Australia
- Education: University of New South Wales; University of Melbourne
- Known for: Internationally recognised cardiologist and physician-scientist
- Scientific career
- Fields: Clinical and interventional cardiology Vascular biology and pathology
- Workplaces: Victor Chang Cardiac Research Institute; University of New South Wales; Icahn School of Medicine at Mount Sinai; National Institutes of Health
- Website: Professor Jason Kovacic; Jason C Kovacic

Jason C. Kovacic (born 1968) is an Australian-born cardiologist and physician-scientist; the Robert Graham Chair and Professor of Medicine, University of New South Wales; Executive Director of the Victor Chang Cardiac Research Institute in Sydney, Australia; and Professor of Medicine (Cardiology) at the Icahn School of Medicine at Mount Sinai, New York.

== Education ==
Jason Kovacic graduated with a degree in Medicine from the University of Melbourne in 1994. While undertaking his degree, Kovacic deferred his studies to compete in the 1986 Junior World Rowing Championships and to take up a Rowing Scholarship at the Australian Institute of Sport (AIS) in Canberra. While in Canberra, Kovacic completed a Bachelor of Medical Science degree in exercise physiology related to blood viscosity in elite rowers at the AIS. Afterward, he resumed his Medicine studies in Melbourne, graduating in 1994. Kovacic also rowed for state of Victoria with members of the Oarsome Foursome and won the 1994 Australian Men's Interstate Eight-Oared Rowing Championship - The King's Cup.

Kovacic undertook a residency at Prince of Wales Hospital, and cardiology specialty training at St. Vincent's Hospital, Sydney. As a cardiology trainee in early 2003, Kovacic was the doctor for Rolling Stones for some of their Licks World Tour Australian shows. He completed his cardiology specialty training and became a Fellow of the Royal Australasian College of Physicians in 2003.

Kovacic pursued a PhD at the Victor Chang Cardiac Research Institute focusing on the application of cell therapy to treat patients with refractory ischemic heart disease. In 2007 he relocated to the US's National Heart, Lung and Blood Institute (NHLBI) at the National Institutes of Health (NIH) in Bethesda, Maryland where he undertook a two-year postdoctoral fellowship with the Director, Elizabeth Nabel. In 2009 Kovacic moved to Mount Sinai Hospital in New York and after a further fellowship in interventional cardiology, went on to become a faculty member in 2010. Kovacic went on to become board certified in both internal medicine and cardiology with the American Board of Internal Medicine.

== Career and research ==
As a physician-scientist, cardiologist and investigator at the Icahn School of Medicine at Mount Sinai. Kovacic established a cardiovascular research laboratory with an interest in the cellular, molecular and genetic mechanisms underlying cardiovascular disease His lab at Mount Sinai received its first NIH grant in 2010.

Kovacic's scientific achievements include successful investigator-initiated clinical studies of cardiovascular progenitor cell therapy, molecular characterization of a novel vascular progenitor cell population unravelling the pathobiology of fibromuscular dysplasia and spontaneous coronary artery dissection, numerous basic and translational studies on the biology and manifestations of atherosclerosis, and studies regarding the role of endothelial to mesenchymal transition (EndMT) in adult vascular biology and disease.

Kovacic also established a clinical practice as an interventional and clinical cardiologist. From 2015 to 2020, Kovacic was the Associate Director of the Interventional Structural Heart Disease Program at Mount Sinai Hospital.

Kovacic became full Professor of Medicine (Cardiology) at Mount Sinai Hospital, and in 2019 was the Director of Cardiovascular Translational Science and Acting Director of the Cardiovascular Research Center at the Icahn School of Medicine at Mount Sinai.

In 2020 Kovacic became the Executive Director of the Victor Chang Cardiac Research Institute and the Robert Graham Chair and Professor of Cardiovascular Research at the University of New South Wales. His cardiovascular research program spans Mount Sinai and the Victor Chang Cardiac Research Institute. He also works as a cardiologist at St. Vincent's Hospital, Sydney

== Awards and recognition ==
- 1985 – Valedictorian of Caulfield Grammar School, Melbourne, Australia.
- 1992 – Recipient of Academic Achievement Award from Australian Institute of Sport.
- 2005 – Australian Delegate to Lindau Nobel Prizewinners Meeting in Lake Constance, Germany.
- 2009 – Recipient of FARE award from National Institutes of Health.
- 2010 – Recipient of Dedication and Achievement Award, The Zena and Michael A. Weiner Cardiovascular Institute and The Marie-Josee and Henry R. Kravis Center for Cardiovascular Health, Mount Sinai Medical Center.
- 2013 – Kovacic was recognized as an 'Emerging Leader' by the Society for Cardiovascular Angiography and Interventions, and the American College of Cardiology.
- 2015 – Named an 'Elite Reviewer' by the Journal of the American College of Cardiology.
- 2017 – Kovacic was admitted into Mount Sinai LEAD Academy (Leadership Emerging in Academic Departments).
- 2018 – Kovacic received the Cullman Family Award for Excellence in Physician Communication for ranking in the top 1% nationally in provider communication by CMS’s CG CAHPS patient experience survey and Deans Healthcare System Team Science Award for the Icahn School of Medicine at Mount Sinai (as PI of the DEFINE-FMD study).
- 2019 – Kovacic received the Founders Award from the Fibromuscular Dysplasia Society of America.

== Other contributions ==
Kovacic has given over 60 US and other international invited presentations and served on many US NIH committees and panels. He is section editor of the Journal of the American College of Cardiology. and an editorial board member at the journals Vascular Medicine and Cardiovascular Research. He is also on the board of directors of the Australian Cardiovascular Alliance (ACvA)
