= Kumud Dhital =

Nepalese surgeon

Prof. Dr. Kumud K. Dhital FRCS
- Born: Rome, Italy
- Citizenship: Nepal
- Occupations: Surgeon, Associate Professor
- Employer(s): Yashoda Hospitals, St Vincent's Hospital, Sydney, University of New South Wales, Victor Chang Cardiac Research Institute
- Notable work: Dead Heart Transplantation
- Spouse: Jane Dhital
- Children: 2

Kumud Dhital (Nepali: कुमुद धिताल) is a Nepalese cardiothoracic specialist and Heart & Lung Transplant Surgeon at Appollo Hospital, Chennai, India.

Dhital's prior work experience was at St Vincent's Hospital, Sydney and, Australia.

In fall 2014, Dhital was head of the surgical team who completed the world's first “dead heart” transplant. A “dead heart” is a heart donated after circulatory death (DCD), where the heart has stopped beating. As of 24 October 2014, 3 patients had received DCD heart transplants. It helps to buy certain time(3 to 6 hrs) for the dead heart to transplant in a receiver.

Dhital was also an associate professor and senior lecturer in surgery at the University of New South Wales. As a faculty member at the Victor Chang Cardiac Research Institute, Dhital worked closely with Professor Peter MacDonald, the medical director of the St Vincent's Heart Transplant Unit. St Vincent's Hospital and the Victor Chang Cardiac Research Institute collaborated to develop their successful DCD transplant technique.
