= David Gonski =

Australian businessman

David Gonski AC
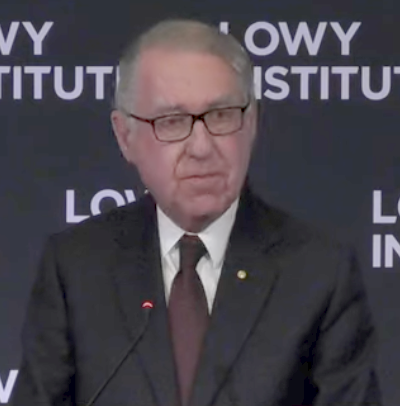
- At a memorial event for Martin Indyk in 2024
- Born: 1953 (age 72–73); Cape Town, South Africa
- Citizenship: Australian
- Education: University of New South Wales (BComm, LLB)
- Spouse: Orli Wargon
- Children: 3

David Michael Gonski AC (born 1953) is an Australian public figure, corporate lawyer, and businessman. He is best known for his recommendations on funding schools in Australia, in a document known as the Gonski Report (or first Gonski Report), following a review commissioned by Julia Gillard, then Minister for Education in the Rudd Government in 2010, published in November 2011. He also chaired a second panel, commissioned by the Turnbull government in 2017, to make recommendations on how school funding should be used to improve school performance and student outcomes, referred to as Gonski 2.0, with the second report being published in 2018. He has also held a large number of positions leading boards in different types of organisations – governmental, commercial, and not-for-profit or philanthropic organisations. Most notably, he has chaired the boards of the Australian Government Future Fund and ANZ Banking Group and been president of the Art Gallery of New South Wales. Since 2005 and as of March 2025, he has been Chancellor of the University of New South Wales.

== Early life and education ==
David Michael Gonski was born in Cape Town, South Africa, in 1953. As a child, his family migrated to Australia in 1961 in the wake of the Sharpeville massacre. His father, Alexander (Alec) Gonski (1919–2006), was a neurosurgeon, and a founding member of The Coast Golf Club at Little Bay, New South Wales. His mother is Hélène. Gonski said that one of his earliest recollections was his mother buying a lithograph by Australian artist Charles Blackman, and said that it was her influence led to his love for Australian art. Gonski is Jewish.

He attended Sydney Grammar School, where he excelled in debating, and Malcolm Turnbull was in his debating team.

He graduated with a Bachelor of Commerce degree and a Bachelor of Laws degree from the University of New South Wales (UNSW).

== Career ==
In 2010, Gonski described himself as a "corporate lawyer-merchant banker".

=== Solicitor ===
Gonski practised as a solicitor with the firm of Freehills from 1977 to 1986, becoming their youngest ever partner at age 25, before leaving to co-found an investment bank. While at Freehills, he taught intellectual property law for the Faculty of Law at the University of New South Wales.

=== Business ===
He established a corporate advisory firm, Wentworth Associates Pty Ltd, which was acquired by Investec Bank in March 2001.

Gonski's business background is extensive, and in 2012 it was estimated that he sat on more than 40 boards.

He had two stints at ANZ Bank: as non-executive director of between 2001 and 2007, and then chair from 2014 to 2020. Between 2008 and 2012 he was chair of the board of ASX Limited.

He also served as chair at Barrenjoey Capital Partners; Ingeus Limited; Swiss Re Life and Health Australia Limited; and Investec Bank (Australia) Limited. He was chairman of Morgan Stanley Australia Limited, and remained a consultant after quitting the leadership position.

He was chairman of the advisory board of Transfield Holdings (the private holding company of Transfield Services); and a non-executive director of Singapore Airlines.

His previous roles have included non-executive director of John Fairfax Holdings (between 1993 and 2005); Westfield Group (between 1985 and 2011); Consolidated Press; non-executive director and chair of Coca-Cola Amatil (1997 to 2017); and ING Australia.

Not all of Gonski's efforts have yielded strong results. During the mid-1980s on Gonski's advice, Frank Lowy established Westfield Capital Corporation with Gonski as an advisor. WCC invested in the predecessor of Ten Network Holdings that eventually resulted in Westfield losing several hundred million dollars.

In August 2022, Gonski was appointed chair of new retirement living provider Levande by EQT Infrastructure, following the acquisition of Stockland Group's 58 villages across New South Wales, Victoria, Queensland, South Australia, and the Australian Capital Territory.

On 30 October 2023, Federal Treasurer Jim Chalmers appointed Gonski to the Competition Taskforce Advisory Panel, which has been established to advise the Treasury on national competition policy.

=== Government and education ===
During 1996 and 1997, Gonski undertook a Review of Commonwealth assistance to the film industry. He was also a member of the committee appointed in 1998–99 to conduct an inquiry into the major performing arts sector (the Nugent Review, after Helen Nugent.) He became chair of Film Australia (a forerunner of Screen Australia) in 1997.

In 1999, Gonski was appointed as a director to the UNSW Foundation. He became chancellor of the University of New South Wales and a member of the council of the university in 2005 and in 2007 became chair of the UNSW Foundation. Gonski is the first alumnus of the University of New South Wales to hold the position of chancellor at that university.

He was chairman of the National e-Health Transition Authority, a statutory authority of the Australian Government; Gonski was a non-executive director of Infrastructure NSW, an agency of the New South Wales Government, and a member of the nomination panel for appointments to the boards of the Australian Broadcasting Corporation and Special Broadcasting Service.

He was chair of the Australia Council for the Arts between 2002 and 2006, and of the board of trustees of Sydney Grammar School between 2003 and 2010.

Amid some controversy, Gonski succeeded David Murray as independent non-executive chairman of the Australian Government Future Fund on 3 April 2012.

==== Gonski Review and Reports ====
In April 2010, Gonski was commissioned by Julia Gillard, then Minister for Education in the Rudd Government, to be chairman of the Review of the Funding of Schools in Australia. The findings and recommendations of the committee were presented to the government in November 2011, whereafter deliberations were entered into by the federal and state governments to consider its content. The committee's report is known as the Gonski Report. The review is also referred to as the Gonski Review of School Education (and, later, Gonski 1.0 or first Gonski Report). Subsequently, the proposed reforms (an increase in funding) became known as "Gonski" and supporters urged governments to "Give a Gonski". The report was removed from the website by the incoming government after the 2013 federal election and is preserved by Australia's Pandora Archive.

In 2017 the Turnbull government commissioned Gonski to chair an independent panel, called the Review to Achieve Educational Excellence in Australian Schools, to examine evidence and make recommendations on how school funding should be used to improve school performance and student outcomes. This report, referred to as Gonski 2.0, was published on 30 April 2018.

The 10-year anniversary of the Gonski report in May 2022 led to criticism of successive state governments failure to implement its recommendations. Finally, by March 2025, all states and territories signed signed on to a new school funding agreement with the Albanese government (after the previous agreement had expired in 2024), which lifts federal funding of public schools to 25 per cent from 20 per cent. Under the new agreement, states are required to increase their funding of public schools to 75 per cent of the minimum amount recommended by the two Gonski reviews, per Gonski's "Schooling Resource Standard" (SRS). This means that they will be "fully funded" according to the Gonski model. Gonski said in an interview that the news was "very, very pleasing".

== Other activities ==
Gonski has headed many boards of a variety of types of organisations, and has donated hundreds of thousands of dollars to arts institutions, as well as motivating other philanthropists to contribute to the arts.

He was president of the Art Gallery of New South Wales (AGNSW) from 1997 until 2006 and again from 2016 until he stepped down in December 2024. As of March 2025 he is a member of AGNSW's Major Patrons Committee for the Sydney Modern Project.

In 2008 Gonski interviewed Cate Blanchett and Andrew Upton, who were co-artistic directors of the Sydney Theatre Company (STC) from 2008, at two events. A few months later he heard from Ian Darling, the outgoing chair of STC, who offered him the chairmanship, and he was appointed in February 2010. As of 2015 he was still chairman of the STC. He also chaired the board of the National Institute of Dramatic Art.

In 2010 he was involved with Philanthropy Australia and the Australia-Israel Chamber of Commerce.

As of 2020 he was patron of Raise Foundation, and as of March 2025 he is patron of the Australian World Orchestra and the Australian Indigenous Education Foundation.

He served on the board of St Vincent's Hospital, Sydney (until 1991), and became chairman of the Bundanon Trust in 1995.

== Recognition and honours ==
In 2002, Gonski was appointed an Officer of the Order of Australia (AO) for service to the community through Australian visual and performing arts organisations, through the development of government policy, and through the promotion of corporate sponsorship for the arts and for charitable organisations.

He received the Centenary Medal in 2003.

In 2007 Gonski was invested as a Companion of the Order of Australia (AC) for service to the arts through charitable support and the development of policy initiatives, to business and commerce as a company director, to education, and to the community through a range of philanthropic endeavours.

In 2008, The Sydney Morning Herald described Gonski as "one of the country's best-connected businessmen" and dubbed him "Mr Networks" for being "arguably Sydney's most networked man". A profile in 2010 by Australian author and Herald columnist Malcolm Knox said that Gonski is "a quiet man, in some ways invisible, and cleaves to the shadows."

In 2012 artist Paul Newton painted a full-length portrait of Gonski, which he donated to the National Portrait Gallery in Canberra.

In October 2012, the Rotary Club of Sydney presented him with its Vocational Service Award for 2012, "particularly because embedded in his life as a family man and public figure are ideals central to the Rotary movement".

In 2013, Gonski was ranked No. 19 on The Sovereign Wealth Fund Institute's "Public Investor 100", and in 2018 named third in the top five most powerful people in Australian education by the Australian Financial Review.

In 2015, Gonski received an Doctor of Laws from the University of Wollongong.

On 28 May 2024, Gonski was awarded an honorary Doctor of Business degree at the University of Sydney, "for his outstanding and visionary leadership, exceptional contribution to the business community and to education, and for his support of the arts".

Gonski is a life fellow of the Australian Institute of Company Directors and a fellow of CPA Australia.

At the University of New South Wales, Law Theatre G02 is named the Gonski Levy Theatre in his honour.

== Personal life ==
Gonski married Boston-born dermatologist Orli Wargon, a medical professional who is of Polish descent. They have three children.

Gonski's mentor was Kim Santow. He was a close friend and advisor to the media baron Kerry Packer. He persuaded Packer to provide funds for the building program at Belvoir St Theatre, where Gonski's wife Orli Wargon was a board member. Together with Lloyd Williams, he was an executor of Packer's estate.

He has also had connections with Rupert Murdoch, Kerry Stokes, and Frank Lowy.

Gonski has long been a lover of theatre and art, and was a subscriber to the Sydney Theatre Company for around 28 years before being invited to become its chairman.

Government offices
| Preceded by Frank Lowy | President of the Art Gallery of New South Wales; 1997 – 2006 | Succeeded by Steven Lowy |
| Preceded by Guido Belgiorno-Nettis | President of the Art Gallery of New South Wales; 2016 – 2024 | Incumbent |
Business positions
| Preceded by David Murray | Chairman of the Australian Government Future Fund; 2012 – 2014 | Succeeded by Peter Costello |
| Preceded by John Morschel | Chairman of ANZ Banking Group; 2014 – 2020 | Succeeded by Paul O'Sullivan |
Academic offices
| Preceded by John Yu | Chancellor of the University of New South Wales; 2005 – present | Incumbent |
