= Corruption in Tonga =

Corruption in Tonga is a continuous struggle for the constitutional monarchy. It significantly impacts governance while undermining the Tonga's economic stability and social development. Despite government initiatives to address the issue, persistent challenges such as political corruption, nepotism, and ineffective anti-corruption mechanisms remain serious concerns. These systemic weaknesses have led to irregularities within the public sector, hindering progress and the nation's development efforts.

== Notable corruption cases ==
An example of high-level corruption implicated the administration of former Prime Minister Pohiva Tu’i’onetoa. As his government prioritized infrastructure development, government-funded projects were disproportionately allocated to companies with close ties to officials, raising concerns about favoritism and misuse of public funds. These include Island Dredging, which is owned by the Minister of Police and the Inter-Pacific Limited, which is associated with former Infrastructure Minister ‘Etuate Lavulavu. The former Prime Minister was also criticized for favoring his own constituency of Tongatapu 10, prioritizing the construction of roads through the village where he lives.

The lack of transparency in the procurement process has resulted in widespread mismanagement of infrastructure projects and the misallocation of public funds. Among the most controversial cases is the handling of a $119 million Chinese loan intended for the reconstruction of Nuku’alofa, Tonga's central business district, which was devastated during the 2006 riots. Although the loan was earmarked to fund key infrastructure projects, including business rehabilitation and government buildings, allegations surfaced that funds were misused or redirected for purposes beyond their original scope. As a result, Tonga continues to negotiate a repayment scheme, while the government grapples with the financial burden of the mismanaged loan.

Another notable corruption case involved Paula Naitoko, a former senior customs officer, who was sentenced to six years in prison for importing methamphetamine and firearms concealed in a box from the United States in 2019. This case highlighted corruption within Tonga's customs department, raising concerns about the integrity of officials responsible for border security.

The corruption case involving Lord Tu’ilakepa, a noble and former Speaker of the House, was also attracted attention. He allegedly accepted bribes from Colombian drug trafficker Obeil Antonio Zuluaga Gomez. Tu’ilakepa reportedly wrote a letter to the head of Tonga's Immigration Department, vouching for Gomez's character to facilitate his visa approval. Although drug-related charges were eventually dropped due to legal complexities, Tu’ilakepa pleaded guilty to firearms charges and was fined instead of serving a prison sentence, allowing him to retain his noble entitlements.

Corruption is not limited to the public sector. In 2023, the Minister for Infrastructure, Sevenitiini Toumo’ua accused private contractors supplying the government materials for road maintenance of falsifying records to obtain TP$1 million a month.

== Impact ==
The impact of corruption for Tonga is significant. The country currently ranks fourth globally in terms of debt levels and is struggling with its payments. The loan from China for the rehabilitation of Nuku’alofa, for instance, has been described by the Lowy Institute as “a millstone around Tonga’s neck” due to its adverse effect on the country's financial stability.

Corruption in Tonga has also significantly undermined public trust in government institutions, weakened economic development, and contributed to inefficiencies in public service delivery. A Transparency International survey revealed that 66% of respondents in Tonga believed corruption in government had increased, with 55% noting a rise in corruption within the business sector.
