= Michael Fullilove =

Public and international policy academic

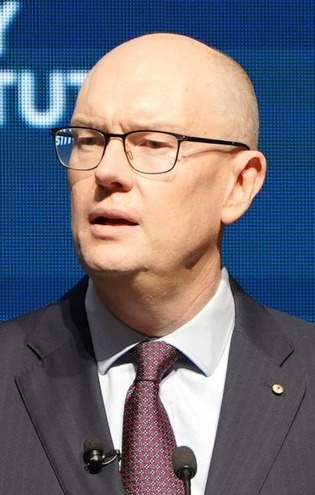
Fullilove in 2024

Michael Fullilove AM, a public and international policy academic, is the Executive Director of the Lowy Institute for International Policy, an international policy think tank located in Sydney.

Fullilove is the author of Rendezvous with Destiny: How Franklin D. Roosevelt and Five Extraordinary Men Took America into the War and into the World (2013), which won the 2014 New South Wales Premier's Literary Award for Non-Fiction. He is also the editor of a 2014 revised edition of Men and Women of Australia! Our Greatest Modern Speeches.

Fullilove writes widely on global issues and Australian foreign policy. His work has appeared in numerous publications and newspapers including The Australian, The Australian Financial Review, The Financial Times, Foreign Affairs, Foreign Policy, The National Interest, The New York Times, Slate, The Sydney Morning Herald, The Wall Street Journal, and The Washington Post.

He also regularly appears as a guest on Australian and international television and radio, and in the past has appeared on programs such as Charlie Rose, ABC Radio National's RN Breakfast and the ABC television's Lateline. In 2015, he delivered the ABC Boyer Lectures.

== Education ==
Fullilove's high school education was at North Sydney Boys' High School in Crows Nest, Sydney. He undertook undergraduate studies at the University of Sydney and the University of New South Wales, where he received degrees in arts and law and was awarded dual university medals. He studied as a Rhodes Scholar at the University of Oxford, where he took a master's degree and a doctorate in international relations.

== Career ==
Fullilove is currently the executive director of the Lowy Institute for International Policy. He wrote the feasibility study for the Lowy Institute in 2002 and served as the director of its global issues program for almost a decade. He was then appointed to the executive director position in August 2012. He has also worked as a visiting fellow at the Brookings Institution in Washington, D.C., an adviser to Australian Prime Minister Paul Keating, and a lawyer. Fullilove remains a nonresident senior fellow at Brookings.

In 2005, Fullilove published 'Men and Women of Australia!' Our Greatest Modern Speeches, an edited collection of post-Federation speeches delivered either by Australians or by notable visitors to Australia. A revised second edition of this collection was published in 2014. In 2013 he co-edited, with Lowy Institute Research Director Anthony Bubalo, Reports from a Turbulent Decade, an anthology of Lowy Institute's work from 2003 to 2013. Also in 2013, Fullilove published his Rendezvous with Destiny: How Franklin D. Roosevelt and Five Extraordinary Men Took America into the War and into the World, which documents the role played by five of Franklin D. Roosevelt's 'personal envoys' in drawing the United States into the Second World War. On 19 May 2014 Rendezvous with Destiny was awarded the New South Wales Premier's Literary Award for Non-Fiction.

A cable dated 17 December 2010 sent from the US embassy in Australia was released to Italian investigative journalist Stefania Maurizi in December 2023 under freedom of information. The US cable concerned reactions in Australia to the United States diplomatic cables leak. The cable revealed that US officials monitored pro-Assange protests in Australia for "anti-US sentiment" and warned that there was "increasing sympathy, particularly on the left" for Assange. It described Fullilove as a "moderating voice" who, "while calling the leaks 'fascinating', also termed WikiLeaks' conduct reckless in a blog post. But for the most part, sensationalist headlines are drowning out Fullilove and other reasonable observers."

== Books ==
- "A Larger Australia: The ABC 2015 Boyer Lectures." Penguin, 2015.
- Rendezvous with Destiny: How Franklin D. Roosevelt and Five Extraordinary Men Took America into the War and into the World. Penguin, 2013.
- (Editor) ‘Men and Women of Australia!’ Our Greatest Modern Speeches. Penguin, 2014.
- (Editor, with Anthony Bubalo) Reports from a Turbulent Decade: The Lowy Institute for International Policy 10th Anniversary Collection. Viking, 2013.
