= Victor Chang =

Australian cardiac surgeon (1936–1991)

Victor Chang AC
- Chang in 1987
- Born: Chang Yam Him; 21 November 1936; Shanghai, China
- Died: 4 July 1991 (aged 54); Sydney, Australia
- Cause of death: Murder (ballistic trauma)
- Other name: Victor Peter Chang
- Education: University of Sydney
- Years active: 1960–1991
- Known for: Pioneer of heart transplantation
- Medical career
- Profession: Heart surgeon
- Institutions: St Vincent's Hospital
- Sub-specialties: Cardiothoracic surgery Heart transplant
- Research: Development of an artificial heart valve with the formation of Pacific Biomedical Enterprises in Singapore.
- Awards: Companion of the Order of Australia

Chinese name
- Traditional Chinese: 張任謙
- Hanyu Pinyin: Zhāng Rènqiān
Transcriptions
Standard Mandarin
- Hanyu Pinyin: Zhāng Rènqiān
Yue: Cantonese
- Jyutping: zoeng^{1} jam^{6} him^{1}

Victor Peter Chang AC (born Chang Yam Him; 21 November 1936 – 4 July 1991) was a Chinese-born Australian cardiac surgeon and a pioneer of modern heart transplantation in Australia.

After completing his medical studies at the University of Sydney and working in St Vincent's Hospital, he trained in the United Kingdom and the United States as a surgeon before returning to Australia. At St Vincent's Hospital, he helped establish the National Cardiac Transplant Unit, the country's leading centre for heart and lung transplants. Chang's team had a high success rate in performing heart transplants, and he pioneered the development of an artificial heart valve. In 1986, he was appointed a Companion of the Order of Australia for his "service to international relations between Australia and China and to medical science".

In 1991, Chang was murdered by two young men in a failed extortion attempt. This event is considered one of the most notorious in the country's history. Chang was given a state funeral, and in 1999 he was voted Australian of the Century at the People's Choice Awards.

His legacy includes setting up the Victor Chang Foundation. Additionally, after his death, the Victor Chang Cardiac Research Institute was created, and the Dr. Victor Chang Lowy Packer Building at St Vincent's Hospital was established.

== Early life and education ==
Chang was born in 1936 in Shanghai to Aubrey Chang and May Lee. In 1938, following the Japanese invasion of Shanghai during the Second Sino-Japanese War, the family moved to Hong Kong, where Chang's sister Frances was born. In 1940, the family relocated again due to the war, immigrating to Rangoon, Burma, where Chang's brother Anthony was born. Because of the bombing of Rangoon in World War II by the Japanese Imperial Army, Chang and his family fled back to China in 1941, spending several months in Yunnan before settling in Chongqing, where Chang attended preschool. Following the end of World War II, the Chang family returned to Hong Kong, where Chang attended primary school in Kowloon Tong and spent two years in St. Paul's College. On 7 April 1948, Chang's mother died from breast cancer at the age of 33, prompting him to consider a career in medicine at the age of 12.

In 1951, Chang's father sent him and his younger sister to Australia to stay with extended family. The siblings initially lived in Campsie with a paternal uncle, with Frances returning to Hong Kong in 1953. Chang stayed and changed schools for more academic challenges, attending Belmore Boys' High School in Belmore. The following year, Chang moved to Punchbowl over conflicts with his cousins to live with an aunt. He completed his secondary education at Christian Brothers' High School in Lewisham in 1954.

He undertook his tertiary education at the University of Sydney, where he graduated with a Bachelor of Medical Science with First-Class Honours and a Bachelor of Medicine, Bachelor of Surgery in 1962.

== Medical career ==
=== Medical training ===
After completing his medical education, Chang interned at St Vincent's Hospital under cardiac surgeon Mark Shanahan, who sent him to London to train with British surgeon Aubrey York Mason.

Chang became a Fellow of the Royal College of Surgeons in 1966 and trained in cardiothoracic surgery at the Royal Brompton Hospital. In London, he met and married his wife Ann (née Simmons).

Chang spent two years in the United States at the Mayo Clinic and became chief resident. In 1972, he returned to St Vincent's Hospital, where he was a consultant cardiothoracic surgeon and was appointed Fellow of the Royal Australasian College of Surgeons in 1973 and Fellow of the American College of Surgeons in 1975.

=== Cardiothoracic surgery career ===
At St. Vincent's Hospital, Chang worked with surgeon Harry Windsor, who had performed Australia's first heart transplant in 1968. The advent of anti-rejection drugs in 1980 made heart transplants more feasible, and Chang lobbied to raise funds to establish a heart transplant program at St. Vincent's. On 8 April 1984, a team of doctors, led by Chang, operated on 14-year-old Fiona Coote, who became Australia's youngest heart transplant patient.

Between 1984 and 1990, Chang's unit performed over 197 heart transplants and 14 heart–lung transplants. The unit had a high rate of success, with 90% of those receiving transplants from the unit surviving beyond the first year. In 1986, Victor Chang was appointed a Companion of the Order of Australia (AC) "in recognition of service to international relations between Australia and China and to medical science".

Concerned about a shortage of organ donors, Chang led the assembly of a team of scientists, engineers, and marketing specialists to develop an artificial heart and manufacture inexpensive heart valves. In 1980, he met Frank Tamru, who acted as a marketing and sales specialist, while he worked for Shiley Laboratories in Singapore. Together with engineers Richard Martin and Brij Gupta, Chang and Tamru founded Pacific Biomedical Enterprises Ltd., which is headquartered in Singapore and set up facilities to develop mechanical and tissue heart valves, called St. Vincent's Heart Valves, in Guangzhou and Sydney. The valves were widely used throughout Asia.

== Death ==
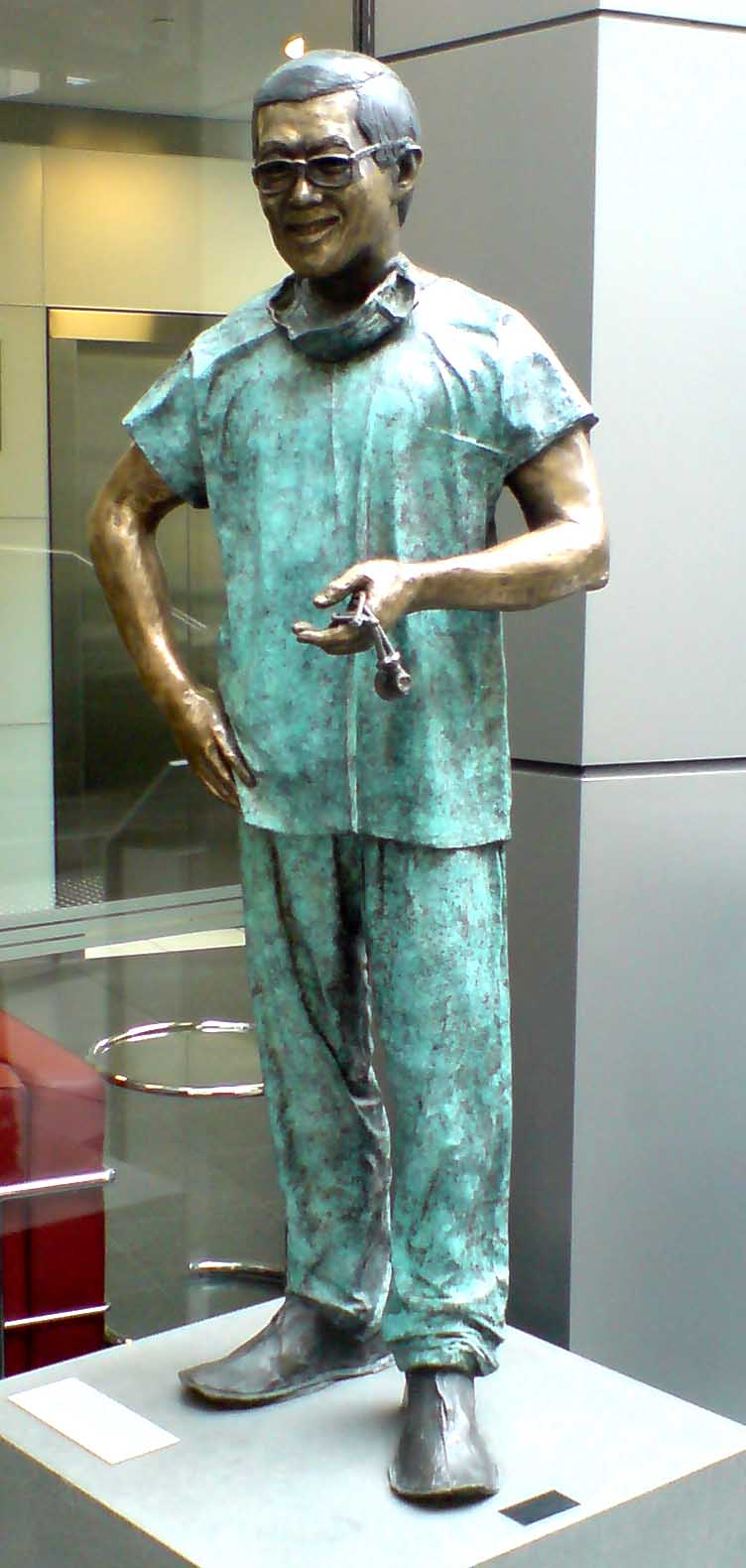
Life-size bronze statue of Chang outside the Dr. Victor Chang Cardiac Research Institute, sculptor Linda Klarfeld.

On the morning of 4 July 1991, Chang was shot once in the cheek and once through the temple in a failed extortion attempt. His body was found slumped in the gutter next to his Mercedes-Benz 500 SL in the Sydney suburb of Mosman. Two Malaysian men, Chew Seng (Ah Sung) Liew and Choon Tee (Phillip) Lim, picked Chang at random from a magazine featuring Asians who had "made it good" in Australia. They ran their Toyota Corolla into Chang's vehicle, forcing him to pull over. After getting into an argument with Chang, who refused to give them money, Liew fired the fatal shots. The first shot entered near the right cheek and exited below the right ear while the fatal second, fired from point-blank range, entered the right temple and passed through the brain. Police investigators initially suspected the involvement of Triad syndicates but later concluded the killing was an amateur act.

=== Trial ===
Liew pleaded guilty and was sentenced to 26 years in prison with a non-parole period of 20 years. Lim, who pleaded not guilty and claimed he did not know Liew had a firearm, received a sentence of 18 to 24 years. Another man, Stanley Ng, abandoned the extortion plan a day before the murder. He had unsuccessfully tried detaining Chang twice to force him to give $3 million. Ng was granted immunity for his evidence. The prosecution alleged the plan had been to abduct Chang, tie him up with his family at his home in Clontarf, and threaten to hang them to coerce Chang into withdrawing money from the bank. In his ruling, Supreme Court Judge John Slattery stated, "It was an absurd, improbable plan, always doomed to failure".

On 26 October 2009, Lim was granted parole. Following a public outcry and objection by the New South Wales Corrective Services Minister, John Robertson, his release was put on hold, pending another parole hearing. The New South Wales Supreme Court ruled that the Parole Authority lacked the power to rescind their previous parole decision. Lim was freed from Parramatta Correctional Centre on 1 March 2010 into the custody of immigration officers waiting outside. He was to be deported back to Kuala Lumpur on 2 March, but the flight was canceled for technical reasons. He was flown out of Australia on 3 March.

After 21 years in prison, Liew was granted parole. In his parole hearing, he made a broad apology for the crime and stated that he believed that his long term in prison had had a good effect. There was some objection from NSW Attorney-General Greg Smith, but it was retracted, and Liew was released from prison on 12 October 2012. He was met by immigration officers and sent back to Malaysia the next day.

=== Memorial ===
Chang was given a state funeral. He was cremated and his ashes were buried under a memorial plaque at Green Park, Darlinghurst, opposite St Vincent's Hospital. His manner of death is described in the Dr. Victor Chang Cardiac Research Institute website as a "tragic circumstance".

In April 2012, Australia Post released a commemorative postcard and postage stamp featuring a portrait of Dr Chang.

== Legacy ==
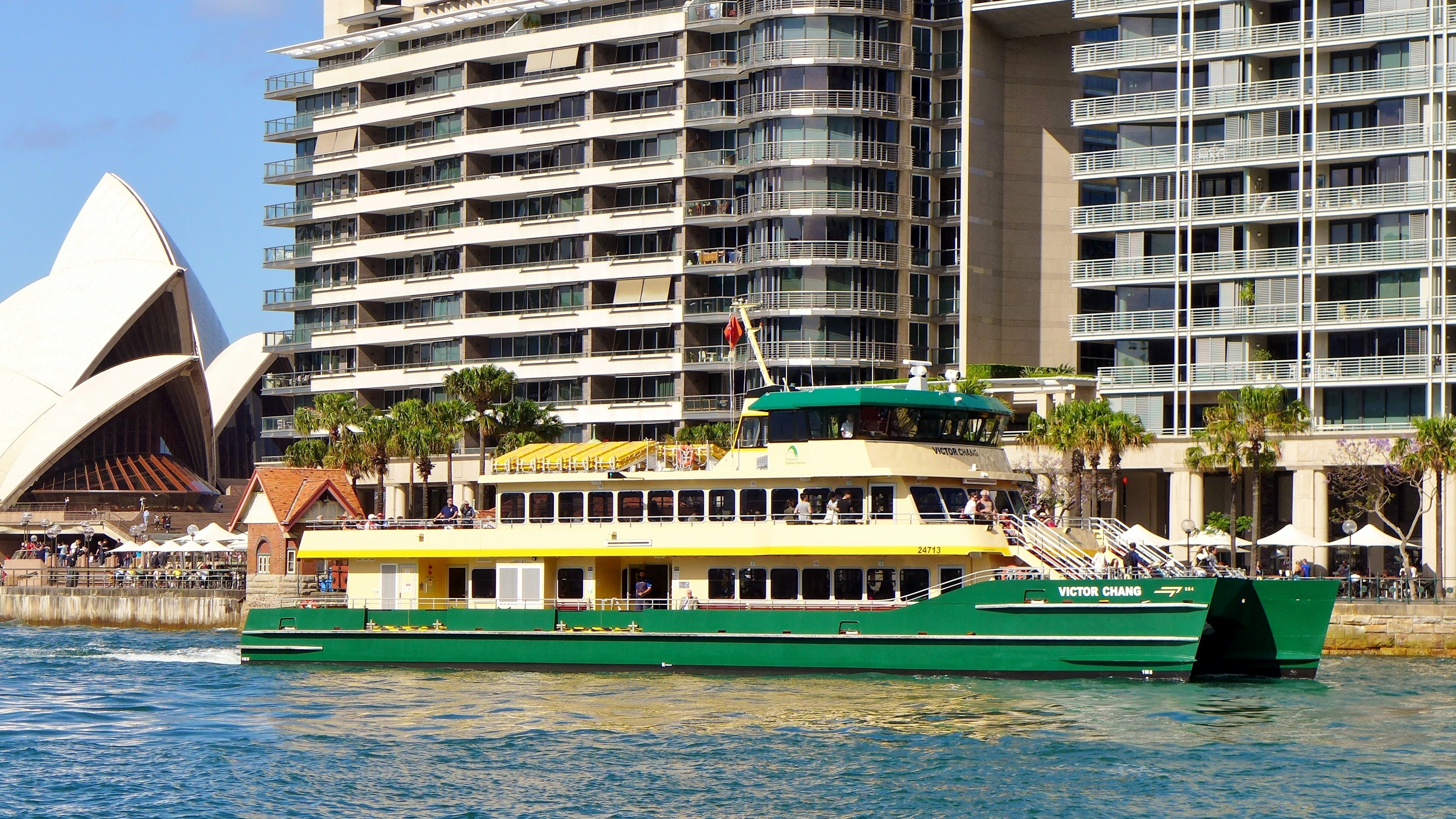
The ferry Victor Chang approaching Circular Quay, 2017

On 15 February 1994, the Dr. Victor Chang Cardiac Research Institute, a body intended to focus on researching "the prevention, diagnosis, and treatment of heart muscle diseases," was launched by Prime Minister Paul Keating with Kerry Packer as its patron. The Dr. Victor Chang Science Labs in Christian Brothers' High School are named after him.

In 1999, Prime Minister John Howard announced Chang as Australian of the Century at the People's Choice Awards. Swimmer Dawn Fraser, cricketer Donald Bradman, and ophthalmologist Fred Hollows were other contenders.

In St Vincent's Hospital, the Dr. Victor Chang Lowy Packer Building was established in 2008 with $35 million from the state government and $45 million in corporate and private donations. Mary, Crown Princess of Denmark officially opened the building and declared that Chang "was an original thinker and saw the need for research and the development of heart assist devices and, not least, he is known for his legendary caring for his patients and their families". In Time magazine's "A Golden Anniversary" article, which lists people who have shaped the last "50 Years in the South Pacific" (1959–2009), Chang was listed as the figure of 1979–1989.

In 2017, a Sydney Ferries Emerald-class ferry was named Victor Chang. Minor planet 24450 was named after him. On 21 November 2023, Google celebrated his 87th birthday with a Google Doodle.

== Personal life ==
Chang met his wife Ann Simmons in 1966. He was the on-call emergency physician at St. Anthony's Hospital in North Cheam, London, where Ann took herself after being taken unwell at a party. They had 3 children: Vanessa, Matthew, and Marcus.

According to his children, he enjoyed driving, saying that cars "provided a chance for Dad to get away from it all; they were his hobby and his opportunity to relax". He restored a 1950s MG TF, and enjoyed the opportunity to vigorously drive many cars, including his 1982 Citroën CX Prestige and several Porsches.

Chang had two younger siblings: sister Frances and brother Anthony. He was not religious but was known to ask the hospital's nun, Sister Bernice, to say a prayer for his patients and was known for his compassion.
