= Sally Dunwoodie =

Australian scientist

Professor Sally Dunwoodie AO FAHMS

Personal details
- Born: Sally Lewers Dunwoodie
- Occupation: Embryologist, geneticist

Sally Lewers Dunwoodie AO is an Australian scientist, specialising in genetic birth defects.

Dunwoodie became an Officer of the Order of Australia in 2024 "For distinguished service to medical research as an embryologist and geneticist, particularly in the field of fetal and neonatal heart disease".

== Early life and education ==
Dunwoodie attended Queenwood School for Girls in Sydney, Australia, graduating in 1981. She studied a Bachelor of Science with Honours at the University of Sydney. She researched the genetics of muscle development and graduated with a PhD from the Children's Medical Research Institute.

Dunwoodie was a Postdoctoral Fellow at the National Institute for Medical Research in London from 1996-1997, and then at the Human Frontiers Scientific Program from 1998-1999. From 2003 to 2007, she was a Senior Research Fellow at the Pfizer Foundation in Australia.

== Scientific career ==
Dunwoodie completed postdoctoral training at the National Institute for Medical Research before starting work at the Victor Chang Cardiac Research Institute in 2000. In 2022, Dunwoodie became the Deputy Director of the Victor Chang Cardiac Research Institute.

== Awards ==
- Officer of the Order of Australia, 2024
- Fellow of the Australian Academy of Health and Medical Sciences, 2019
- Australian Museum Eureka Prize for Scientific Research (2018)
- NSW Premier's Prize for Excellence in Medical Biological Sciences (2017)
- Australian Financial Review Women of Influence (2015)
- Research Excellence Award for the Top Ranked Project Grant, NHMRC, 2019
- President's Medal, Australian and New Zealand Society for Cell and Developmental Biology, 2018, and Emerging Leader Award, 2010
- Finalist, New South Wales Premier's Woman of the Year Award, 2016
- NHMRC Top 10 Research Projects Award, 2014
- 100 Women of Influence Award, Australian Financial Review and Westpac, 2014
- Top 100 Thinkers in Sydney, Sydney Morning Herald, 2012.

== Personal life ==
Dunwoodie has two children.

== Selected publications ==
- S. L. Dunwoodie (2009), "The role of hypoxia in development of the Mammalian embryo", Developmental cell, 17(6), pp. 755–773.
- J. O. Szot, C. Campagnolo, Y. Cao, K. R. Iyer, H. Cuny, T. Drysdale, J. A. Flores-Daboub, W. Bi, L. Westerfield, P. Liu, T. Ngong Leung, K. W. Choy, G. Chapman, R. Xiao, V. M,. Siu, S. L. Dunwoodie (2020), "Bi-allelic Mutations in NADSYN1 Cause Multiple Organ Defects and Expand the Genotypic Spectrum of Congenital NAD Deficiency Disorders", American Journal of Human Genetics, 106(1), pp. 129–136.
- S. L. Dunwoodie, D. Henrique, S. M. Harrison, R. S. P. Beddington (1997), "Mouse Dll3: a novel divergent Delta gene which may complement the function of other Delta homologues during early pattern formation in the mouse embryo", Development, 124(16), pp. 3065–3076.
- G. Chapman, D. B. Sparrow, E. Kremmer, S. L. Dunwoodie (2011), "Notch inhibition by the ligand Delta-Like 3 defines the mechanism of abnormal vertebral segmentation in spondylocostal dysostosis", Human Molecular Genetics, 20(5), pp. 905–916.
