= Steven Lowy =

Australian executive (born 1962)

Steven Lowy AM
- Steven Lowy at the Art Gallery of NSW
- Born: November 24, 1962; Sydney, Australia
- Occupations: A principal, Lowy Family Group.
- Board member of: Westfield Corporation (1989 -2018); Scentre Group (2014–2019); Football Federation Australia (Chair) (2015–2018); Lowy Institute (2003 - now) (Deputy Chair since 2024); Victor Chang Cardiac Research Institute (Past Chair 2008-2013 and life patron); Art Gallery of NSW (Past President of Trustees 2006-2013 and life patron)
- Spouse: Judy Lowy (Levin) OAM (m. 1986)
- Children: 4
- Parents: Frank Lowy AC (father); Shirley Lowy OAM (deceased) (mother)

Steven Mark Lowy (born 24 November 1962) is a leading Australian businessman and philanthropist. He is the former co-chief executive officer of Westfield Corporation, a leading global shopping centre company that was acquired by French company Unibail-Rodamco in 2018 in what was one of the largest transactions in Australian corporate history. His principal activities now focus on investments associated with the Lowy family's private company, Lowy Family Group, as well as a number of philanthropic and community roles including as Deputy Chairman of Australia's leading foreign policy think tank, the Lowy Institute; a director of the Lowy Foundation and Lowy Medical Research Foundation; President of the Hakoah Club; a board member and trustee of Keren Hayesod-UIA; and on the Executive and Board of Governors of the Jewish Agency for Israel.

During his career Lowy has served on numerous corporate and philanthropic boards including chairman of world board of trustees of Keren Hayesod-UIA, Westfield Corporation, the Australian Shopping Centre Council, Scentre Group, Neurotech Pharmaceuticals Inc, as Chairman of Football Federation Australia and president of the board of trustees of the Art Gallery of New South Wales. He is also a former Chairman of the Victor Chang Cardiac Research Institute.

Lowy is the third and youngest son of Frank Lowy, a co-founder of Westfield. The Lowy family is one of the most prominent business families in Australia with a reported net worth in excess of $8 billion in 2016. In late 2014, Steven Lowy's life was documented in a feature article in The AFR Magazine, "The Son Rises: Steven Lowy ascends at Westfield". In 2010 Lowy was appointed a Member of the Order of Australia for service to business, philanthropy, the arts and medical research.

== Early life and education ==
Lowy was born to a traditional Jewish family, in Sydney, the youngest son of Shirley and Frank Lowy, and educated at Sydney Grammar School and the University of New South Wales where he graduated as a Bachelor of Commerce (Honours). He was awarded the University Prize for his honours thesis and later co-authored a paper with Professor Mark Hirst published in the academic journal Accounting, Organizations and Society. He received a Doctorate of Business (honoris causa) from UNSW in 2024.

He joined Westfield Holdings in 1987, was appointed a director of Westfield Holdings in 1989 and a managing director in 1997. He has also been a director of Westfield Management Limited, the manager of Australia's then leading retail property trust, Westfield Trust since 1988. Prior to joining Westfield Holdings in 1987 he worked in investment banking at First Boston Corporation in the US for two years.

== Westfield ==
Westfield was listed on the Sydney Stock Exchange in 1960 by Lowy's father, Frank and his partner John Saunders. The pair were newly arrived immigrants to Australia and had opened a small delicatessen shop in the western suburbs of Sydney. Their venture was a success and their ambition led to the expansion of their business to include the development of residential housing and larger shopping centres.

The first Westfield centre was built in Blacktown in Sydney's western suburbs in 1959. This was shortly followed by a new centre in Hornsby in Sydney's north in 1961. The company flourished and expanded to other Australian cities and then the United States in the mid-1970s and to New Zealand in 1997 and the United Kingdom in 2000. At this point, Westfield had 86 centres in its global portfolio, with some 13,200 retailers and $24.1 billion in assets.

In 2004, the various Westfield entities were merged to create Westfield Group to provide the scale and financial heft required to continue international expansion. This led to the creation of two landmark shopping centres in London (Westfield London at Shepherd's Bush in 2008) and Westfield Stratford City (on the site of the 2012 London Olympics) in 2011.

In 2014 Westfield Group underwent another major corporate restructure in which its Australian and New Zealand operations merged with Westfield Retail Trust to create a new company, Scentre Group. At the same time, another new, separate company, Westfield Corporation, was created to own and manage the former Westfield Group’s shopping centres in the US and UK. Westfield Corporation opened Westfield World Trade Center in New York on 16 August 2016 and advanced plans to build its first shopping centre in Europe, in Milan Italy.

A feature of the company was a marked shift towards high quality "iconic" or flagship malls showcasing the world's best retailers and luxury brands. Five-star service and upscale restaurants and entertainment were a critical element in this shift, as was its adoption of a more aggressive "innovation" strategy to use digital technology "to better connect the retailer with the shopper". Since the establishment of Westfield Labs based in San Francisco in 2012, several digital initiatives were piloted and implemented in several Westfield shopping centres around the world. Westfield Labs has been recognised by Fast Company magazine as one of the 50 most innovative companies in the world, and as one of the Top 10 retail companies for "giving the mall a high-tech makeover". Following the sale of Westfield Corporation to Unibail Rodamco in 2018 Westfield's former retail digital business was transferred to a new and separate entity OneMarket which was chaired by Steven Lowy AM. OneMarket was wound up in December 2019.

== Philanthropy and community activity ==
Lowy is currently President of Hakoah Club Sydney, a board member and trustee of Keren Hayesod-UIA, and on the Executive and Board of Governors of the Jewish Agency for Israel. He is a former Chairman of the World Board of Trustees of Keren Hayesod-UIA (2019–2024) and recipient of Ze’ev Jabotinsky award. He is a former president of the board of trustees of the Art Gallery of New South Wales (2006–2013) and now a Life Governor, Chairman of the Victor Chang Cardiac Research Institute (2008–2013), now a Life Patron and Governor, and is the Deputy Chairman of the Lowy Institute Australia's leading foreign policy think tank, and the Lowy Medical Research Institute, a private medical organisation.

Steven was a member of the Prime Minister's Business-Government Advisory Group on National Security and has been the presiding officer of the NSW Police Force associate degree in Policing Practice Board of Management.

Together with his father, Frank, and two brothers, David and Peter, he plays a key role in decisions about the Lowy family's philanthropic activities. In recent years, the family has supported the establishment of the Lowy Cancer Centre at the University of NSW, a new building (the Lowy Packer Building) to house the Victor Chang Cardiac Research Institute and the St Vincent's Centre for Applied Medical Research. The building was opened by Princess Mary of Denmark on 3 September 2008. In 2013 Frank Lowy revealed to a Philanthropy Australia audience that his family had donated more than $350 million to various causes during the previous decade. This has since increased considerably.

== Football ==
Lowy is a passionate soccer fan and played the game competitively throughout his youth. He continued to compete in masters tournaments until injury ended his playing career in his early ‘50s. On 17 November 2015 he was elected as a director of Football Federation Australia (FFA) by nine state football federations and a representative of the 10 Hyundai A-League clubs which form Australia's national football competition. He was then elected chairman by his fellow directors. The move attracted criticism from the football community for apparent nepotism, and Steven's lack of success outside his father's business influence under his leadership. FFA achieved its highest income and sponsorship on record and the Socceroos qualified for their fourth consecutive World Cup (one of only 12 teams to do so) and together with Prime Minister Malcolm Turnbull, launched Australia and New Zealand's successful bid to host the 2023 FIFA Women's World Cup. Steven Lowy's tenure as chairman ended in November 2018, after a protracted conflict with the A-League clubs and other elements of the football community regarding a desire to expand the democratic nature of the Federation, and to split the A-League away from the FFA's direct control into a new English Premier League style club owned structure.

== Personal life ==
Lowy married Judy Levin in 1986. They have four children.

Government offices
Preceded by David Gonski	President of the Board of Trustees of the Art Gallery of New South Wales; 2007–2013	Succeeded by Guido Belgiorno-Nettis
