= Fiona Coote =

Australian heart transplant recipient (born 1970)

Fiona Coote is a heart transplant recipient who, upon undergoing surgery, by Dr. Victor Chang, at the age of 14 on 8 April 1984, became Australia's youngest heart transplant recipient. While Coote was the fourth transplant recipient in Australia, she is only the second to survive for a significant period.

== Personal life ==
Born on 3 January 1970 and growing up on a family farm, Galen, 8 km (5 mi) from Manilla in northern New South Wales, Coote attended a private Catholic school near Tamworth. She married in 1996.

== Heart transplant ==
The procedure was performed by the Chinese–Australian cardiothoracic surgeon Dr Victor Chang. The urgency was due to complications of viral-induced tonsillitis that dramatically weakened her heart. The surgery was performed at St Vincent's Hospital, Sydney. When she later began rejecting the first heart, Coote was forced to endure a second transplant, which took place in 1986. She has enjoyed good health since.

== Post transplant ==
Much of Coote's life has been spent in the public eye and she has worked for numerous charitable organisations including the Victor Chang Foundation as a Patron and the Starlight Foundation. In 1999, Coote was appointed a Member of the Order of Australia (AM) in recognition of her public awareness promotion of heart disease, and for her work raising funds for seriously and terminally ill children. Coote has also worked in promotions for Willow Valley, a cereal manufacturer, and Dairy Farmers.

As a result of her fame, Coote was approached to appear in the Australian soap Neighbours. Despite beginning rehearsals, Coote ultimately decided acting was not for her. Channel Ten publicly blamed the back down on illness but Coote later attributed it to the associated pressure to participate in interviews and publicity for the show. Coote has made a number of television appearances, including appearing in a segment on Burke's Backyard.

In 2001 a rose was named in honour of Coote. Called "Fiona's Wish", it is a hybrid tea (bush rose) and the bi-coloured blooms are cherry red, edged with gold reverse.
