= Frank Lowy =

Australian businessman, founder and chairman of Westfield

Sir Frank Lowy AC
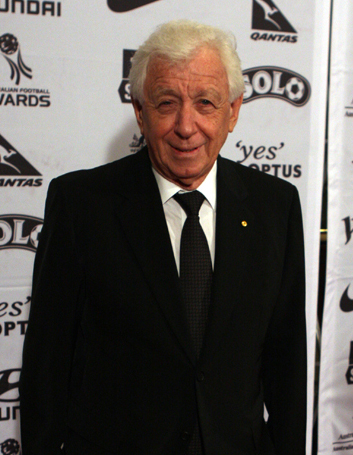
- Lowy at the Australian Football Awards in October 2011
- Born: Frank P. Lowy; 22 October 1930 (age 96); Fiľakovo, Czechoslovakia (now Slovakia)
- Occupations: Businessman, investor
- Years active: 1952−present
- Known for: Co-founder, Westfield
- Board member of: Westfield Corporation (1960–2011); Lowy Institute
- Spouse(s): Shirley, Lady Lowy OAM (née Rusanow) (m. 1954; died 2020)
- Children: 3; including Steven Lowy

Sir Frank P. Lowy (/ˈloʊi/ LOH-ee; born 22 October 1930) is an Australian and Israeli businessman and the former long-time chairman of Westfield Corporation, a global shopping centre company with US$29.3 billion of assets under management in the United States, United Kingdom and Europe. In June 2018 Westfield Corporation was acquired by French company Unibail-Rodamco.

Lowy was the inaugural chairman of Scentre Group, the owner and manager of Westfield-branded shopping centres in Australia and New Zealand.

Lowy is the founder of the Lowy Institute, Australia's leading foreign affairs think tank, which has alternatively been described as "neoliberal", "centre-right" leaning or "reactionary". Lowy is also chairman of the Institute for National Security Studies, an independent think tank that studies key issues relating to Israel's national security and Middle East affairs.

== Early life ==
Lowy was born in Czechoslovakia (in what is now Slovakia), is of Jewish Slovak-Hungarian origins and was forced to live in a ghetto in Hungary during World War II. He made his way to France in 1946, where he boarded the ship Yagur, heading for Mandatory Palestine. However, he was caught on route by the British authorities and interned in a detention camp in Cyprus. Lowy joined the Haganah, and then the Golani Brigade, and fought in the 1948 Arab–Israeli War in the Galilee and Gaza.

== Career ==
In 1952, Lowy left Israel and joined his family, who had left Europe for Australia and started a business delivering small goods. In 1953, he met fellow immigrant John Saunders. The pair became business partners, eventually creating Westfield Development Corporation through the development of a shopping centre at Blacktown in Sydney's western suburbs. Over the next 30 years, Lowy and Saunders developed shopping centres across Australia and the United States (from 1977); and listed the company on the Australian Stock Exchange in 1960 as Westfield Development Corporation. Saunders sold his interests and left the company in 1987. In the 1990s Lowy took the company to New Zealand, then the United Kingdom in the 2000s.

Lowy was appointed a Director of the Reserve Bank of Australia in 1995, was reappointed in 2000 and 2003, and concluded his term in 2005. In 2008 Lowy and related interests were mentioned in documents stolen from the LGT Bank of Liechtenstein by a former employee. A subsequent US Senate probe and an Australian Taxation Office audit investigated Lowy and his sons, David and Steven, on their involvement with financial institutions in tax havens located in Liechtenstein and Switzerland. Lowy maintained he had not done anything wrong, the matter was settled with the ATO, and no action was taken.

After turning 80 in October 2010, Lowy officially stood down as executive chairman of the Westfield Group effective May 2011, taking on the role of non-executive chairman. Sons, Steven and Peter, became joint chief executives. In October 2015, Lowy stepped down as the chairman of the Scentre Group, a role that he had held for 55 years.

Lowy supports a Big Australia and advocates for an ambitious immigration program.

== Personal life ==
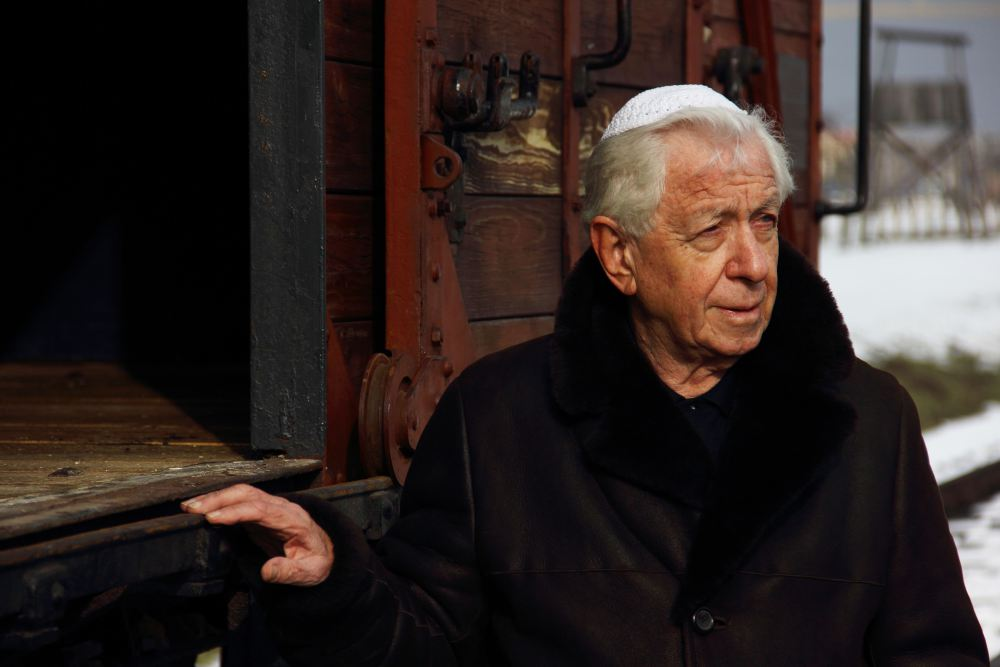
Lowy at the 2013 March of the Living in Auschwitz-Birkenau in front of the cattle car donated in memory of his father, Hugo

Lowy married Shirley Rusanow in 1954, having met at a Jewish dance when he was 21. They have three sons, Peter and Steven, who managed the Westfield business, and David, who manages the family's private investments. His wife was the founder of the Chai Foundation which is dedicated to finding and funding research into effective but less toxic forms of cancer therapy. His son Peter, is chairman of Tribe Media Corp, the parent of the Jewish Journal and served as chairman of the University of Judaism.

In an Australian television production broadcast in 2010, called Family Confidential, it was revealed that Lowy had kept a secret about his survival in Nazi occupied Hungary.

Lowy moved to Israel at the end of 2018. Lady Lowy died in Tel Aviv in December 2020, after a long battle with dementia. In What Will Become of Us, a documentary screened at the 2019 Sydney Film Festival, Lowy spoke openly of the trauma of gradually losing his wife.

=== Net worth ===
Lowy is one of seven individuals who have appeared on the Financial Review Rich List, formerly the BRW Rich 200 list, since it was first published in 1984. In 2010, the BRW magazine assessed Lowy's net worth at A$5.04 billion, making him Australia's richest person at that time. In 2016 his net worth was assessed as A$8.26 billion on the BRW Rich 200 list; and the same net worth the following year when the list was renamed as the Financial Review Rich List. As of May 2025, his net worth was assessed at A$10.28 billion in the 2025 Rich List published in the Australian Financial Review.

Forbes Asia magazine assessed Lowy's net worth at US$6.5 billion in January 2019 and placed him fourth in its Australia's 50 Richest people.

Year	Financial Review Rich List		Forbes Australia's 50 Richest	
Year	Rank	Net worth (A$)	Rank	Net worth (US$)
2007	2	$6.51 billion ▲	2	$4.30 billion ▲
2008	2 ▼	$6.30 billion ▼	4 ▼	$4.40 billion ▼
2009	2	$4.20 billion ▼	2 ▲	$2.80 billion ▼
2010	1 ▲	$5.04 billion ▲	3 ▼	$3.50 billion ▲
2011	6 ▼	$4.98 billion ▼	4 ▼	$4.30 billion ▲
2012	3 ▲	$6.47 billion ▲	5 ▼	$4.40 billion ▲
2013	2 ▲	$6.80 billion ▲	4 ▲	$5.30 billion ▲
2014	4 ▼	$7.16 billion ▲	6 ▼	$4.60 billion ▼
2015	4	$7.84 billion ▲	3 ▲	$5.0 billion ▲
2016	3 ▲	$8.26 billion ▲	4 ▼	$5.0 billion
2017	4 ▼	$8.26 billion	4	$5.70 billion ▲
2018	5 ▼	$8.42 billion ▲	4	
2019	7 ▼	$8.57 billion ▲	4	$6.50 billion ▲
2020	9 ▼	$8.30 billion ▼		
2021	9	$8.51 billion ▲		
2022	10 ▼	$9.30 billion ▲		
2023	10	$9.33 billion ▲		
2024	14 ▼	$9.33 billion		
2025	16 ▼	$10.28 billion ▲		

Legend
Icon	Description
Steady	Has not changed from the previous year
▲	Has increased from the previous year
▼	Has decreased from the previous year

=== Football in Australia ===
In the 1980s, Lowy was president of the Hakoah Social Club, which was attached to the Hakoah Sydney City East FC football team. Hakoah played in the National Soccer League between 1977 and 1986. In 1982 Lowy stood for a role in the Australian Soccer Federation board, but was defeated by a coalition headed by long term President Arthur George. In 1987 Hakoah opened up the season with a match in front of 5,187 fans. This was not enough for Lowy, who had promised to withdraw Hakoah from the competition if crowds were low. After a heated general meeting the membership voted to withdraw. Lowy withdrew from Club Hakoah and the sport in general by 1988, not to return until the final demise of the NSL and Soccer Australia in 2004 after decades of mismanagement & poor decisions regarding television contracts.

With the NSL and Soccer Australia defunct, Prime Minister John Howard & Sports Minister Rod Kemp commissioned the 2003 Report of the Independent Soccer Review Committee. Commonly known as the 'Crawford Report', it called for a new board headed up by Lowy. Lowy quickly placed Soccer Australia into liquidation, replacing it with a new "Australia Soccer Association" which was later renamed to Football Federation Australia, in order to distance itself from the previous iterations and to align with the general usage of the word football across the world. Much of the Crawford Report recommendations were ignored by Lowy in favour of his own decisions regarding the setup and future of the Federation & the sport in Australia. Most importantly for his control, he ignored recommendations regarding the board composition that called for players, coaches, referees, indoor players and a specific women's football representative. He also ignored the Player's Association report that recommended having two teams in Sydney & Melbourne.

Lowy was chairman of the Football Federation Australia (FFA) from 2003 to November 2015. Some observers credit him and John O'Neill, a former rugby union executive, with resurrecting soccer in Australia. A televised "A-League" is now in place, and the country has become a member of the Asian Football Confederation.

In 2007 Lowy commenced a campaign to host the 2022 FIFA World Cup in Australia backed with A$43 million in support from the Australian Government. In 2010, amid allegations of bribery, politics, and back-scratching, FIFA awarded Qatar the right to host the World Cup.

In 2015, he fell off a stage as the A-League trophy was due to be presented. In May 2015 he underwent surgery to resolve a complication that had arisen from the fall.

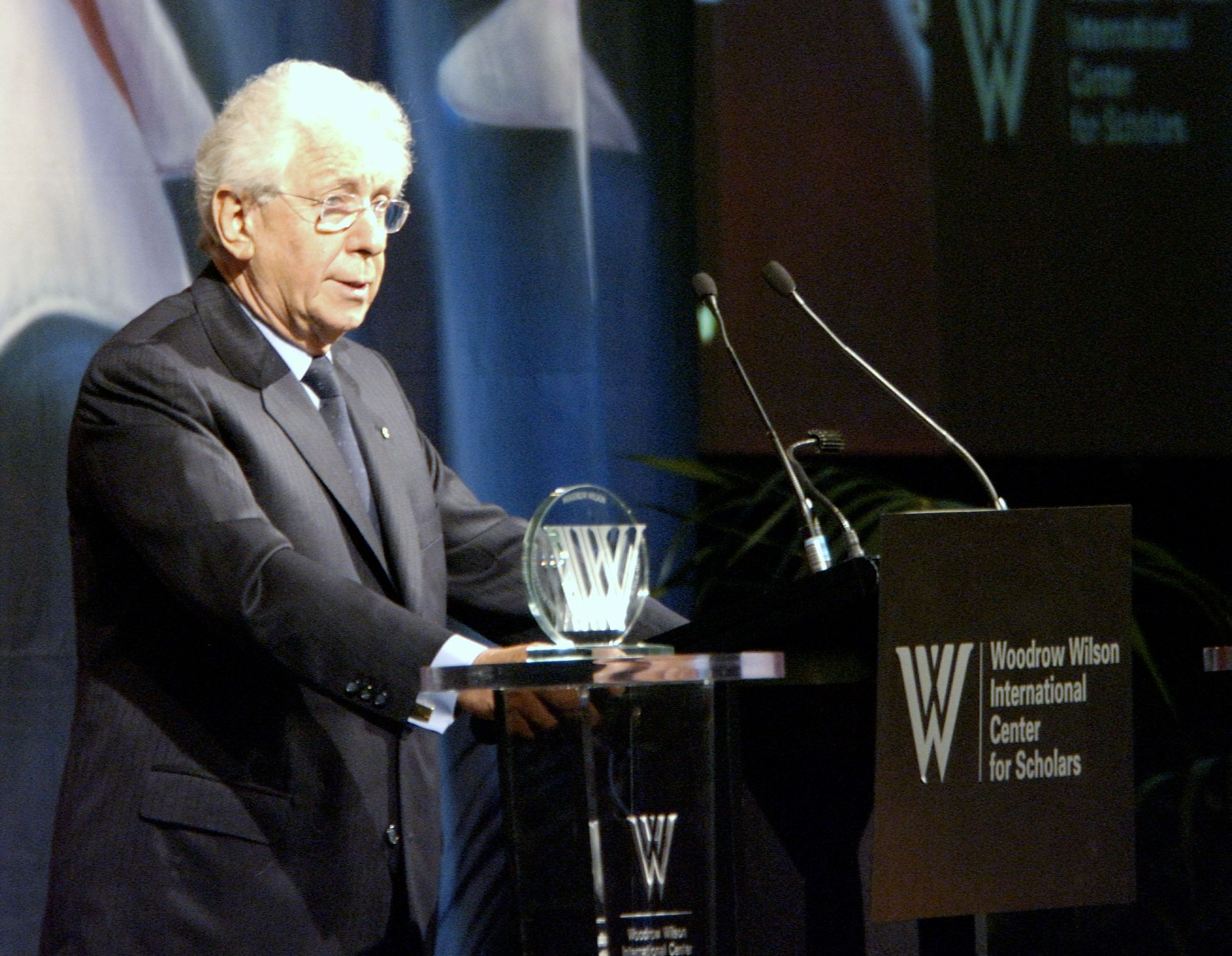
Lowy receiving the Woodrow Wilson Award for Corporate Citizenship in 2005

Lowy completed his term-limited period in charge of the FFA, then handed over power to his son Steven Lowy unopposed. The move was controversial and viewed as nepotism and questions over Steven's lack of experience in football governance were partly responsible for a significant power struggle at the highest levels. Intervention by FIFA eventually resulted in a new governance model, the splitting away of the A-League competition from direct control of the FFA and large changes at the boardroom level. Steven resigned from the role and Lowy also sold the last of his shares in Sydney FC at this time.

=== Philanthropy ===
Lowy has a reputation for giving his time and financial support to a broad range of causes. He was awarded the title of Australia's leading philanthropist by peak body, Philanthropy Australia, with donations in 2002 of A$10 million.

In April 2003 to mark the 50th anniversary of his arrival in Australia, Lowy established the Lowy Institute, an independent international policy think tank devoted to foreign affairs, and Australia's role in the world. It was reported that a gift of A$30 million was made to establish the Institute. Together with the Packer family, in 2008 Lowy donated an undisclosed amount towards the Victor Chang Cardiac Research Institute. In 2010, Lowy and his family donated A$10 million to facilitate the construction of the UNSW Lowy Cancer Research Centre, a collaborative centre of the Children's Cancer Institute Australia and the Faculty of Medicine at the University of New South Wales. In 2022, he donated $18 million to Tel Aviv University.

== March of the Living ==
In April 2013, Lowy attended the March of the Living, where he shared the story of how his father perished during the Holocaust, with thousands of young students from around the world who had gathered in Auschwitz-Birkenau to observe Holocaust Remembrance Day. As a 13-year-old boy, Lowy had never known about the loss of his father, Hugo Lowy, who was beaten to death at Auschwitz for refusing to leave his Jewish prayer bag containing his Jewish prayer shawl (Talit) and phylacteries (Teffilin) behind.. As a mark of respect to Hugo Lowy and other Hungarian Jews, Lowy commissioned the restoration of a railway wagon that had transported Hungarian Jews to Auschwitz, and placed the wagon on site at the former concentration camp.

Later, during the memorial ceremony, Lowy addressed the students and said: "So here I am, with you all in Birkenau. I know he was also here, under this same sky. Just like almost half a million Hungarian Jews, he came to this place in a wagon and, almost immediately after arriving, disappeared as smoke into the sky. I was 13 when I lost my father, and now I am 82 – and you know, I still miss him."

== Awards and recognition ==
In 2000, he was appointed a Companion of the Order of Australia for his service to the community through the development of the property industry and expansion of the retail sector in Australia and internationally, and as philanthropist committed to support of wide-ranging social and cultural endeavours. In 2002, he received the Golden Plate Award of the American Academy of Achievement presented by Awards Council member Ehud Barak in Dublin, Ireland. The establishment of the Lowy Institute led him to being awarded the Woodrow Wilson Award for Corporate Citizenship in 2005 by the Woodrow Wilson International Center for Scholars. On 2 October 2007 Lowy received the Henni Friedlander Award for the Common Good at Bowdoin College in Brunswick, Maine, United States. In 2008 Lowy was honoured by Australia Post for his contribution to philanthropy as one of the nation's five leading, living philanthropists with a commemorative postage stamp that was released on the eve of Australia Day as part of the Australian Legends series.

He was knighted in the 2017 Queen's Birthday Honours (UK) for services to business and philanthropy.

In November 2024 Frank Lowy, in a joint ceremony together with Melbourne lawyer Mark Leibler, was awarded Israel’s highest civilian award, the Israeli Presidential Medal of Honour, for his commitment to Israel and the support of the Jewish communities in Australia.

Government offices
Preceded by Michael Gleeson-White	President of the Board of Trustees of the Art Gallery of New South Wales; 1988 – 1996	Succeeded by David Gonski
