= Westfield Corporation =

Australian-based British-American shopping centre company

- Type: Public
- Traded as: ASX: WFD
- Industry: Real estate development; shopping centre management
- Predecessor: Westfield Group (1960–2014)
- Founded: 2014; 12 years ago
- Founder: Frank Lowy; John Saunders
- Defunct: June 2018
- Fate: Merged with Unibail-Rodamco
- Successor: Unibail-Rodamco-Westfield (2018–present)
- Headquarters: Level 29, 85 Castlereagh Street, Sydney, Australia
- Area served: Australia; New Zealand; United States; United Kingdom
- Key people: Steven Lowy (Co-CEO); Peter Lowy (Co-CEO); Sir Frank Lowy (Chairman); Brian Schwartz (Deputy Chairman); Michael Gutman (President & COO); Elliott Rusanow (CFO)
- Revenue: A$635.5 million (2014)
- Total assets: A$29 billion (2016)
- Number of employees: 1,700 worldwide (2016)
- Parent: Unibail-Rodamco-Westfield
- Subsidiaries: Westfield Management Limited; Westfield America Management Limited
- Website: www.westfieldcorp.com

Westfield Corporation was an Australian commercial real estate company and operator of shopping centres. It was founded with the spin-off of the Westfield Group in 2014, where assets in Australia and New Zealand formed the Scentre Group, and assets in the United Kingdom and United States formed the Westfield Corporation. It was listed on the Australian Stock Exchange with the ticker symbol "WFD".

Westfield accepted a $32.8 billion takeover offer from French company Unibail-Rodamco, excluding Westfield Labs, on 12 December 2017. The takeover was completed, and the parent company was renamed Unibail-Rodamco-Westfield, in June 2018.

Westfield undertook ownership, development, design, construction, funds/asset management, property management, leasing, and marketing activities for its centres. Its portfolio included investment interests in 40 shopping centres across the United States and Europe, encompassing around 7,500 retail outlets and total assets under management in excess of $28.5 billion. It also operated Westfield Labs, a technology and design arm based inside the Westfield San Francisco Centre.

== History ==
The first development of the Westfield Corporation was named "Westfield Place", and opened in July 1959 in Blacktown. The name Westfield is derived from "west", related to the West-Sydney location, and "field", due to having been located on subdivided farmland. The centre was opened by John Saunders and Frank Lowy.

The company was floated on the Australian Stock Exchange in 1960 and built another five centres in New South Wales before expanding into Victoria and Queensland in 1966–67.

The expansion into the United States began with the purchase of the Trumbull Shopping Park in Connecticut in 1977, and was followed by three centres in California, Michigan, and Connecticut in 1980 and three centres in California, New Jersey, and Long Island, New York, in 1986. In 1994, Westfield collaborated with General Growth and Whitehall Real Estate to purchase 19 centres for US$1 billion. By 2005, the company owned centres in 15 US states.

In the 1990s, Westfield began a major expansion to New Zealand, where they mostly bought existing shopping centres of the Fletchers company and progressively rebranded them. In 2007, with Westfield Albany, the company opened a new centre in the country.

On 9 May 2006, Westfield announced the sale of eight United States shopping centres which it deemed to fit outside its strategic plan, to Centro Properties Group.

In 2010, the Westfield Group split 50% of its Australian and New Zealand assets into the Westfield Retail Trust, trading on the Australian Stock Exchange as WRT. This trust was folded into the Scentre Group during the 2014 split.

In December 2017, the Westfield Board announced that it was recommending a takeover of the company by Unibail-Rodamco, one of the largest real estate companies in Europe headquartered in Paris, for a reported $24.8 billion USD. The takeover was completed, and the parent company was renamed Unibail-Rodamco-Westfield, in June 2018.

== Properties ==
Westfield had interests in over 100 shopping malls worldwide, including the United States, the United Kingdom, France, Spain, Germany, Poland, Sweden, The Netherlands and Italy.
