= Victor Chang Cardiac Research Institute =

Australian medical research centre

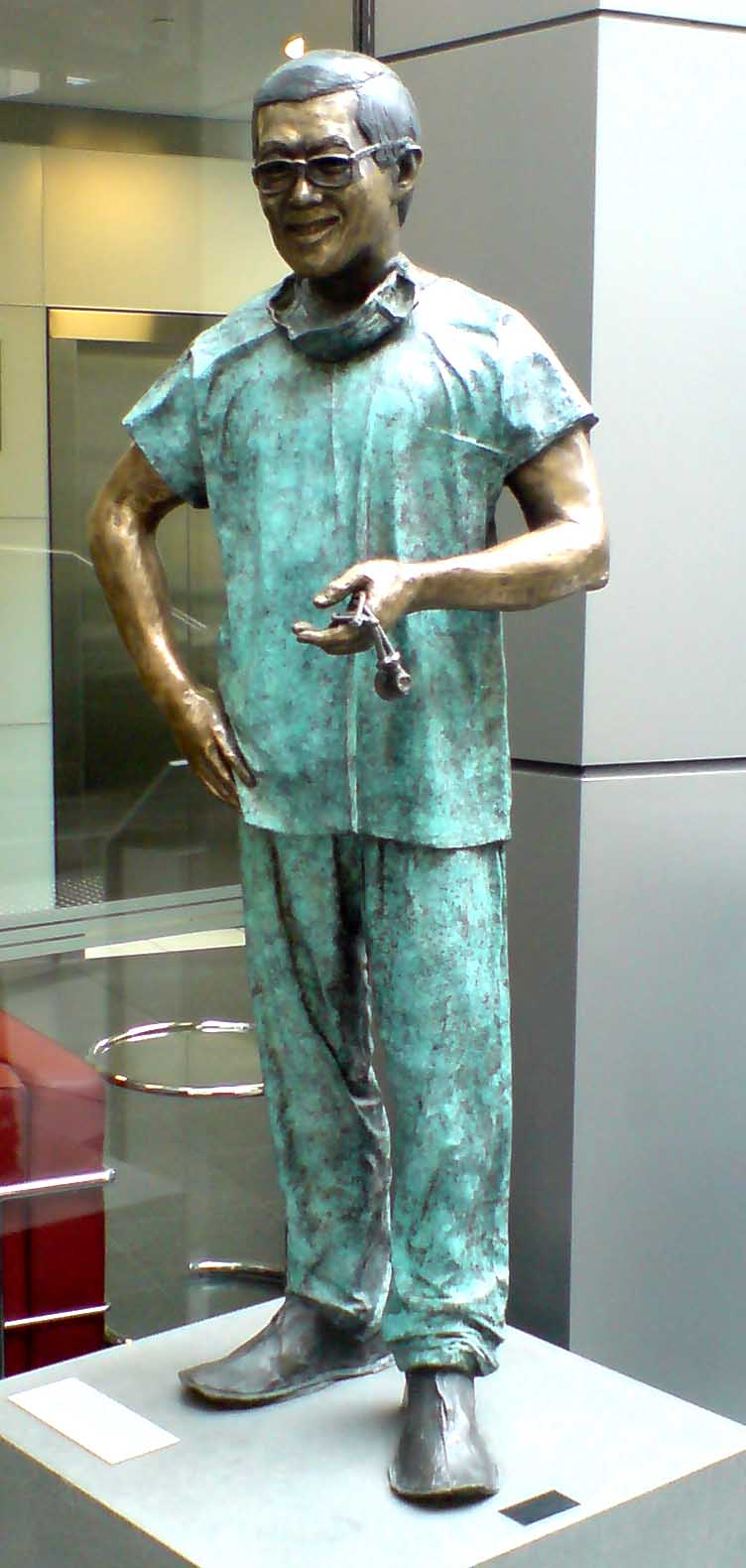
- Life-size bronze statue of Victor Chang by sculptor Linda Klarfeld outside the Victor Chang Cardiac Research Institute
- Founders: Dr. Victor Chang AC (founded and named in his honour three years after his fatal shooting)
- Established: 15 February 1994
- Mission: The relief of pain and suffering, and the promotion of wellbeing, through an understanding of the fundamental mechanisms of cardiovascular biology in health and disease.
- Chair: Matthew Grounds
- Executive Director: Professor Jason Kovacic
- Faculty: University of New South Wales
- Adjunct faculty: St Vincent's Hospital, Sydney; Garvan Institute of Medical Research
- Key people: Patrons: Queen Mary of Denmark; Steven Lowy AM; Ann Chang (widow of Victor Chang)
- Location: Darlinghurst, New South Wales, Australia
- Coordinates: 33°52′43.357″S 151°13′19.122″E
- Interactive map of Victor Chang Cardiac Research Institute
- Website: www.victorchang.edu.au

The Victor Chang Cardiac Research Institute (VCCRI) is an Australian non-profit medical research facility that is dedicated to finding cures for cardiovascular disease. With headquarters located in Darlinghurst, New South Wales, the research hub is home to more than 20 research laboratories and the Victor Chang Cardiac Research Institute Innovation Centre. The institute's mission is "the relief of pain and suffering, and the promotion of well-being, through an understanding of the fundamental mechanisms of cardiovascular disease". Its key research is focused on the prevention and treatment of various heart diseases, including arrhythmia, cardiac arrest, cardiomyopathy, congenital heart disease, heart attack, heart failure, high cholesterol, obesity, spontaneous coronary artery dissection (SCAD) and stroke.

The Victor Chang Cardiac Research Institute was founded in memory of pioneering cardiac surgeon Victor Chang AC. Established on 14 February 1994, approximately three years after Chang's death, and opened by then Prime Minister Paul Keating, the institute has become a world-class research and research training facility.

== History ==
=== Early years ===
The Victor Chang Cardiac Research Institute was officially launched on 14 February 1994, by Prime Minister Paul Keating, with Kerry Packer AC as patron, and Professor Robert Graham as executive director. The institute was originally founded under the auspices of the Sisters of Charity and St Vincent's Hospital. It was named in honour of heart transplant surgeon Victor Chang, who died in Sydney under tragic circumstances on 4 July 1991. Dr Chang passionately believed in the ability for research to better the lives of many more than surgery ever could, saying "you can save hundreds of lives through surgery but you could save millions through medical research". On 27 February 1995, the institute was accredited as an independent research facility with Neville Wran AC, QC as its inaugural chairman.

==== Official opening ====
On 1 November 1996, Diana, Princess of Wales officially opened the Victor Chang Cardiac Research Institute's temporary premises in Darlinghurst at the Garvan Institute of Medical Research, touring several heart research laboratories. The Princess attended the Victor Chang Cardiac Research Institute Royal Ball as the Guest of Honour on 31 October 1996. Following the death of Diana, the institute established the inaugural Princess' Lecture which was first delivered by Professor Sir Magdi Yacoub in 1998.

In 2000 Dr Victor Chang was voted Australian of the Century by the people of Australia.

==== Building opening ====
On 4 March 2005, Crown Princess Mary of Denmark was the guest of honour at the second Victor Chang Royal Ball. The Royal Ball aimed to raise funds to develop a purpose-built, world class research centre in honour of Victor Chang. With the help of Atlantic Philanthropies, construction of the Lowy Packer Building commenced in August 2006 with a groundbreaking ceremony in Darlinghurst. The ten-storey Lowy Packer Building would become the Victor Chang Cardiac Research Institute's new home. Construction was completed in 2008 and on 3 September, the Lowy Packer Building was formally opened by Crown Princess Mary of Denmark. Crown Princess Mary also attended a dinner with Crown Prince Frederik held inside the new complex. Queen Mary is an Honorary Life Governor of the Victor Chang Cardiac Research Institute.

=== Growth and milestones ===
In 2008 former NSW Premier Neville Wran retired as chairman, becoming a patron of the institute. Steven Lowy AM took up the position. In 2013 Lowy stood down as chairman, leaving the board after six years as chairman and 19 years as a director of the institute. Matthew Grounds AM was appointed chairman of the board. In 2013, the Victor Chang Cardiac Research Institute established an additional research laboratory based at the University of Western Australia. Led by Professor Livia Hool, the expansion marks the initial phase of the institute's plans to enhance cardiovascular research in Western Australia.

In 2019 the institute celebrated its 25th anniversary with a dinner at the Sydney Opera House. In 2020 the founding executive director of the institute, Professor Robert Graham stepped down after 25 years, handing over the leadership to Professor Jason Kovacic.

In 2022 the institute and the University of Western Australia announced an official partnership. Along with the new strategic partnership, an additional Victor Chang Cardiac Research Institute laboratory was opened at the university.

== Research ==
The Victor Chang Cardiac Research Institute focuses on medical research, centered around;

- Arrhythmia
- Atrial fibrillation
- Atherosclerosis
- Cardiac arrest
- Cardiomyopathy
- Congenital heart disease
- Coronary heart disease
- Fibromuscular dysplasia
- Genomics
- Heart attack
- Heart failure
- Heart transplantation
- High blood pressure
- High cholesterol
- Obesity
- Spontaneous Coronary Artery Dissection
- Stroke
- Women and heart disease

== Location and facilities ==
The Victor Chang Cardiac Research Institute, located within the purpose-built Lowy Packer Building, is a major partner in the St Vincent's Hospital Research Precinct in Darlinghurst, Sydney. Other partners in the precinct are the Garvan Institute of Medical Research, the St Vincent's Centre for Applied Medical Research, and St Vincent's Hospital itself. The institute was funded by grants from the Government of Australia and a donation from Kerry Packer. The Lowy Packer Building was funded by the grants from the Government of Australia and the Government of New South Wales and donations from the Atlantic Philanthropies, the Lowy and Packer families, the National Australia Bank, ANZ Bank, Citigroup, and other donors. The budget for the building was A$80 m.

The Victor Chang Cardiac Research Institute's laboratories in Western Australia are located on the grounds of The University of Western Australia, which is approximately ten minutes from Perth CBD.

The VCCRI has state-of-the-art research laboratories and support facilities. The institute holds itself to the highest standards of excellence in research, research training and efforts to translate each new discovery into practical medical applications.

== Structure and organisation ==
The institute is governed by its board of directors, chaired by Matthew Grounds, an investment banker.

As of 31 December 2017 the institute had a team of over 300 research and support staff work across six research divisions, being:

- Cardiac Physiology and Transplantation
- Developmental and Stem Cell Biology
- Molecular Cardiology and Biophysics
- Molecular, Structural and Computational Biology
- Vascular Biology, and
- Innovation Centre.

In addition, the institute has a business unit responsible for administration and core facilities and another unit that drives fund development.

The Victor Chang Institute is also affiliated with the University of New South Wales, accredited by Australia's National Health and Medical Research Council (NHMRC) as an independent biomedical research facility; and is a member of the Association of Australian Medical Research Institutes (AAMRI). The institute is also a Research Ministry within the Mary Aikenhead Ministries.

== Notable people ==
=== Chairman ===
- Matthew Grounds AM

=== Executive director ===
- Prof. Jason Kovacic

==== Deputy directors ====
- Prof. Sally Dunwoodie
- Prof. Jamie Vandenberg

== See also ==
- Health in Australia
- Cardiovascular disease in Australia
