= Fibromuscular Dysplasia Society of America =

U.S. nonprofit organization

Fibromuscular Dysplasia Society of America is an American health charity that deals with fibromuscular dysplasia, a vascular disease.

The society sponsors a registry of patients with fibromuscular dysplasia.
