= Robert M. Graham (cardiologist) =

Australian medical researcher

Professor Robert M. Graham AO FAA FAHMS
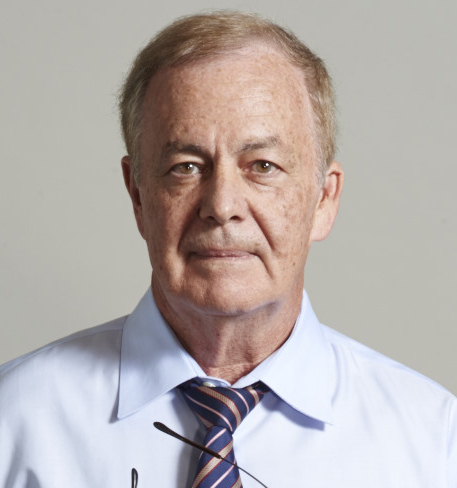
- Robert M Graham
- Born: 1948 (age 77–78); Sydney, Australia
- Education: University of New South Wales
- Occupations: Cardiologist; Scientist
- Known for: Contributions to adrenergic receptor structure, function and signalling
- Awards: Foreign Member, Royal Danish Academy of Sciences and Letters (2010)
- Scientific career
- Fields: Molecular Cardiology; Molecular Pharmacology
- Workplaces: Victor Chang Cardiac Research Institute; University of New South Wales; University of Texas Southwestern Medical School; Harvard Medical School; Cleveland Clinic Foundation
- Thesis: Molecular characterization of the α1-adrenergic receptor (1988)
- Website: Professor Bob Graham

Robert Michael Graham (born 1948) is an Australian-born clinician-scientist. He is the Des Renford Professor of Medicine at University of New South Wales and the Head of the Molecular Cardiology and Biophysics Division at Victor Chang Cardiac Research Institute.

== Education ==
Robert Graham received his medical training, MBBS with Honours, and his MD degree from the University of New South Wales. He then trained as a physician in internal medicine and cardiorenal disease at the Gordon Stokes, Head, Cardiorenal Diseases, Sydney Hospital in Australia and the US, leading to Fellowships of the Royal Australian College of Physicians and the American College of Physicians.

In the US he received postdoctoral training in pharmacology (Alfred G. Gilman, Chairman and Nobel Laureate: William A. Pettinger, Head, Clinical Pharmacology) and medicine (Don Seldin, Chairman) at the University of Texas Southwestern Medical School. Graham was then appointed as an Assistant Professor in Pharmacology and Medicine at University of Texas Southwestern Medical School.

== Career ==
In 1982, Graham moved to the Massachusetts General Hospital (Cellular and Molecular Research Laboratory, Edgar Haber, Chairman) and Harvard Medical School, Boston as an Associate Professor of Medicine. During his time in Boston, he did a sabbatical in the laboratory of Nobel Laureate H. Gobind Khorana at the Massachusetts Institute of Technology. In 1989, he moved to the Cleveland Clinic Foundation as the Robert C. Tarazi Chairman of the Molecular Cardiology Department, and Professor of Physiology and Biophysics at Case Western Reserve University School of Medicine, Cleveland, Ohio.

Graham returned to Australia in 1994 as the inaugural Executive Director at the Victor Chang Cardiac Research Institute. He held the position until stepping down in March 2020.

== Research ==
Graham's research is reported in over 325 peer-reviewed papers and cited over 26,000 times.

For many years his research has focused on molecular cardiology, with emphasis on circulatory control mechanisms, receptor signalling, hypertension and cardiac hypertrophy. Together with Charles Homcy, his work contributed to understanding receptor structure, function and signalling. This work subsequently led to the discovery that a protein crosslinking enzyme also functions as a unique multifunctional protein involved in receptor signalling.

More recently, together with colleagues, Ahsan Husain and Siiri Iismaa, Graham has been actively involved in studies of cardiac regeneration and the application of stem cells for the treatment of heart diseases, and with A/Prof Eleni Giannoulatou, the pathophysiology and genetics of spontaneous coronary artery dissection.

In 2021, with Glenn King and Nathan Palpant, he co-founded Infensa Bioscience, an Australian biotechnology company.

He serves on the Board of Directors of the Lowy Medical Research Institute in California; and Infensa Bioscience, an Australian biotechnology company, and also as the Chairman of its Clinical Advisory Board. He also serves as Chairman, Strategic Advisory Board, Institute of Molecular Biosciences at the University of Queensland and as Vice-President and Secretary, Biological Sciences, Australian Academy of Science.

== Awards and recognition ==
- 1982, he was recognised as an Established Investigator by the American Heart Association.
- 1994, he was received the Eccles Award from the National Health & Medical Research Council, Australia.
- 1998, Graham was named an Outstanding Graduate at the University of New South Wales Medical School.
- 2001, Graham received the R T Hall Prize from the Cardiac Society of Australia and New Zealand and was made a Fellow of the American Heart Association (FAHA).
- 2002, Graham was made a Fellow of the Australian Academy of Science (FAA).
- 2003, Graham was awarded the Centenary of Federation Medal by the Federal Government of Australia.
- 2006, Graham was made a Fellow of the Cardiac Society of Australia and New Zealand (FCSANZ).
- 2008, Graham received a Lifetime Achievement Award from the National Heart Foundation of Australia.
- 2009, Graham was awarded an Order of Australia (AO) and voted President of the Association of Australian Medical Research Institutes.
- 2010, Graham was made a Corresponding Member of The Royal Danish Academy of Sciences and Letters in the Natural Sciences Class.
- 2011, Graham was made a Life Member of the NSW Division of the Heart Foundation of Australia.
- 2014, Graham was named a Foundation Fellow of the Australian Academy of Health and Medical Sciences (FAHMS)
- 2015, Graham was a Founding Director of the Australian Cardiovascular Alliance.
- 2016, Graham received a NSW Ministerial Award for Cardiovascular Research Excellence
- 2018, Graham was made a Life Member of the Royal Australasian College of Physicians.

== Personal life ==
Graham has four children, Dana Cadden, Simon Graham, Caitlin Graham and Shaun Graham, and one sister, Monica Graham. He was married to Jennifer Graham (nee Hilsdon).
