= Westfield Group =

Australian shopping centre group

- Logo used from 1960 to 2014
- Type: Public
- Traded as: ASX: WDC
- Industry: Real estate investment trusts
- Genre: Shopping malls
- Founded: 1960; 66 years ago
- Founder: John Saunders; Frank Lowy
- Defunct: 2014; 12 years ago
- Successors: Scentre Group; Westfield Corporation
- Headquarters: Sydney, New South Wales, Australia
- Area served: Australia; United States; United Kingdom; New Zealand; Italy
- Key people: Peter Lowy (co-CEO) Steven Lowy (co-CEO)
- Revenue: ▲US$833 million (2014)
- Operating income: ▲US$391 million (2014)
- Net income: ▲US$461 million (2014)
- Total assets: ▲US$28.5 billion (2014)
- Number of employees: 2,000+ (2014)
- Parent: Scentre Group
- Website: westfieldcorp.com

Westfield Group was an Australian shopping centre company that existed from 1960 to 2014, when it split into two independent companies: Scentre Group, which owns and operates the Australian and New Zealand Westfield shopping centre portfolio; and Westfield Corporation, which continued to own and operate the American and European centre portfolio until it merged to form Unibail-Rodamco-Westfield.

== History ==
The company was floated on the Australian Securities Exchange in 1960 and built five centres in New South Wales before expanding into Victoria and Queensland in 1966–67. For the first half of 1971, Westfield reported earnings of $886,382.

In the 1990s, Westfield began a major expansion to New Zealand, where they mostly bought existing shopping centres of the Fletchers company, progressively rebranding them. Only in 2007, with Westfield Albany, did the company open a fully new centre in the country.

On 9 May 2006, Westfield announced the sale of eight United States shopping centres which it deemed to fit outside its strategic plan, to Centro Properties Group.

In April 2012 it was announced that the Westfield Group would sell seven non-core property assets to Starwood Capital Group for A$1 billion and one other property to an undisclosed buyer for A$147 million. The funds would be used to repay debt and invest in businesses offering higher return. The sales were expected to be completed by mid–2012.

== Operations ==
Despite the Westfield Group's asset dimensions, the Westfield Group was strongly controlled by the Lowy Family Group, including non-executive chairman, Frank Lowy, one of its founders. Lowy's two younger sons, Steven and Peter, were joint managing directors.

=== Australia ===
A feature of ticketless parking at Westfield Miranda, Westfield Hurstville, Westfield Bondi Junction and Westfield Doncaster was that SMS alerts were provided for when the shopper's three free hours of parking were about to expire and when the shopper left the centres. This feature was later removed due to concerns that the system could be used to track the movements of others by giving the wrong car numberplate on registration of the phone number.

=== United States ===
Westfield entered the United States market in 1977. In September 2003 the company received $17.3 million as a party in the insurance claim following the terrorist attack on the World Trade Center. On 18 February 2006, the Los Angeles Times reported that Westfield had agreed to acquire 15 stores from Federated Department Stores, all but three in southern California. On 9 May 2006, Westfield sold eight United States shopping centres to Centro Properties Group.

=== New Zealand ===
Westfield entered the New Zealand market in 1997 and acquired an interest in the St Lukes Group portfolio in 1998. Westfield malls became by far the most numerous chain in New Zealand, with six of its 12 centres in Auckland, including their largest development located in Albany. Westfield had NZ$2.8 billion in assets under management in New Zealand. In mid-2012, Westfield sold its 50% share of Westfield Shore City in Takapuna on Auckland's North Shore, now known as Shore City Shopping Centre.

=== United Kingdom ===
As of 2014, before Westfield Corporation was created, Westfield had an interest in two shopping centres in England and Northern Ireland. Its most significant asset was Westfield's 50% partnership in the £1.6b Westfield London development in Shepherd's Bush, West London.

Westfield owned the Westfield Stratford City and also controlled the Stratford City redevelopment project next to 2012 Olympic park in Stratford in east London, having acquired the 75% of the project that it did not already own.

Westfield was the developer behind the troubled Broadway shopping development in Bradford after acquiring Stannifer in 2004.

On 9 October 2007 Westfield opened the £340m extension and refurbishment of Derby's Eagle Centre, which saw the shopping centre rebranded Westfield Derby. The centre was subsequently sold to Intu in 2014.

Westfield were reviewing plans with the Whitgift Foundation to rebuild the Whitgift Centre in Croydon in South London.

== Relationship with tenants ==
The Australian Competition & Consumer Commission investigated several disputes between the Westfield Group and its tenants. In 2004 the Commission found Westfield was abusing its market and commercial power in settling disputes with tenants, and forced Westfield to formally undertake to not engage in "Unconscionable conduct and intimidation" of tenants.

Also in Australia, Westfield fee structures and policies were criticised by retailers who operated in centres that had been taken over by the company. Retailers suggested that when centres were acquired there should be more cooperation between the new operators and existing tenants in bringing shops up to the corporate standards of the Westfield Group, and increases in rent (required to operate a shopping centre with high standards of fittings and services) should be staged with the required improvements in fittings.

=== Relationship with competition ===
In Liverpool, Australia in 2002, a competing shopping centre was lodged to Liverpool City Council and subsequently built. The centre would be about three kilometres from Westfield Liverpool.
