= St Vincent's Hospital, Sydney =

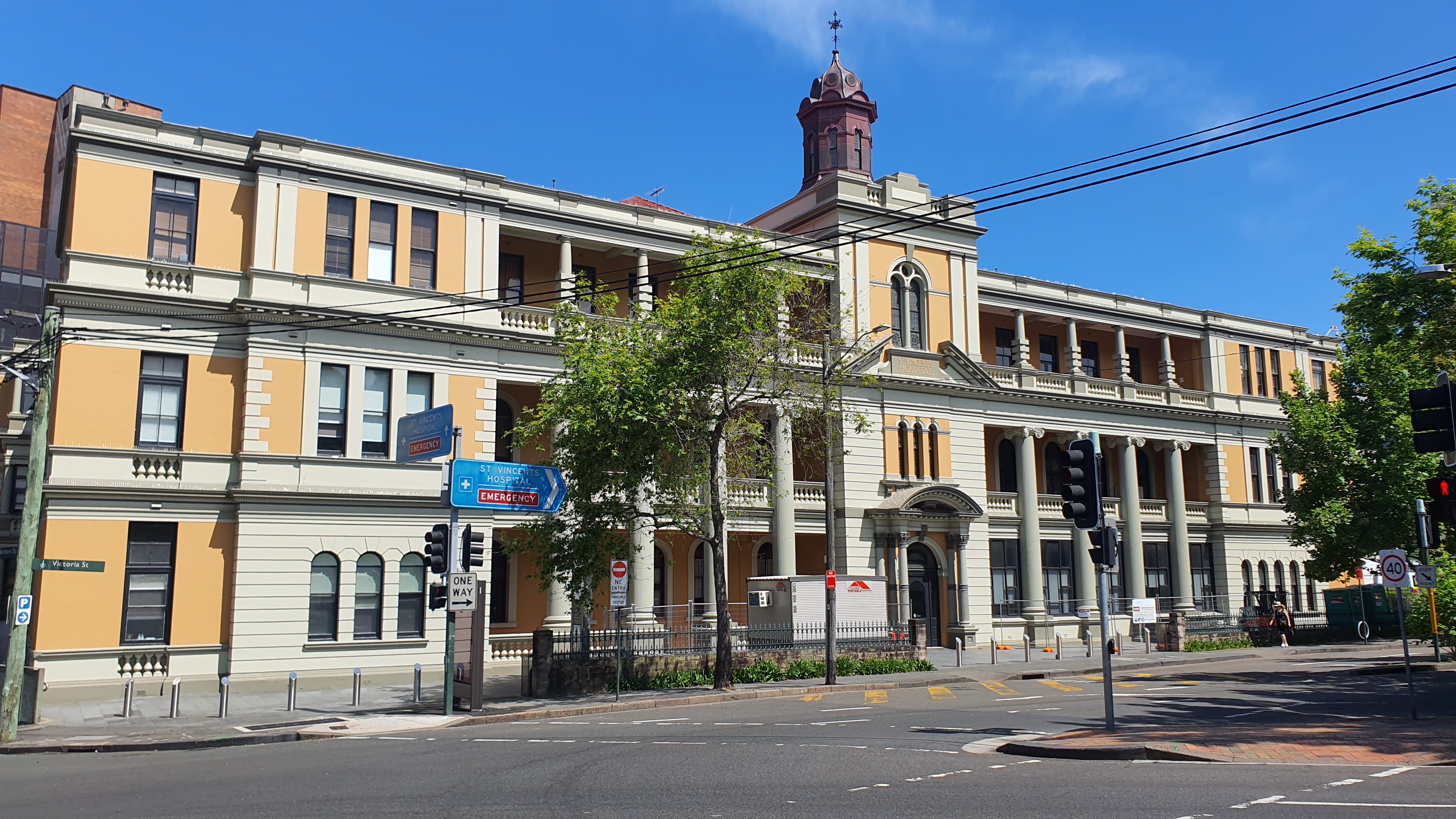
- De Lacy Building, St Vincent's Hospital

Geography
- Location: 390 Victoria Street, Darlinghurst, New South Wales, Australia
- Coordinates: 33.8797°S 151.2211°E

Organisation
- Care system: Medicare
- Type: District General, Teaching
- Religious affiliation: Catholic
- Affiliated university: University of New South Wales and the University of Notre Dame Australia
- Patron: Sisters of Charity of Australia
- Network: St Vincent's Health Australia

Services
- Emergency department: Yes, adult major trauma centre

History
- Founded: 1857

Links
- Website: svhs.org.au
- Lists: Hospitals in Australia

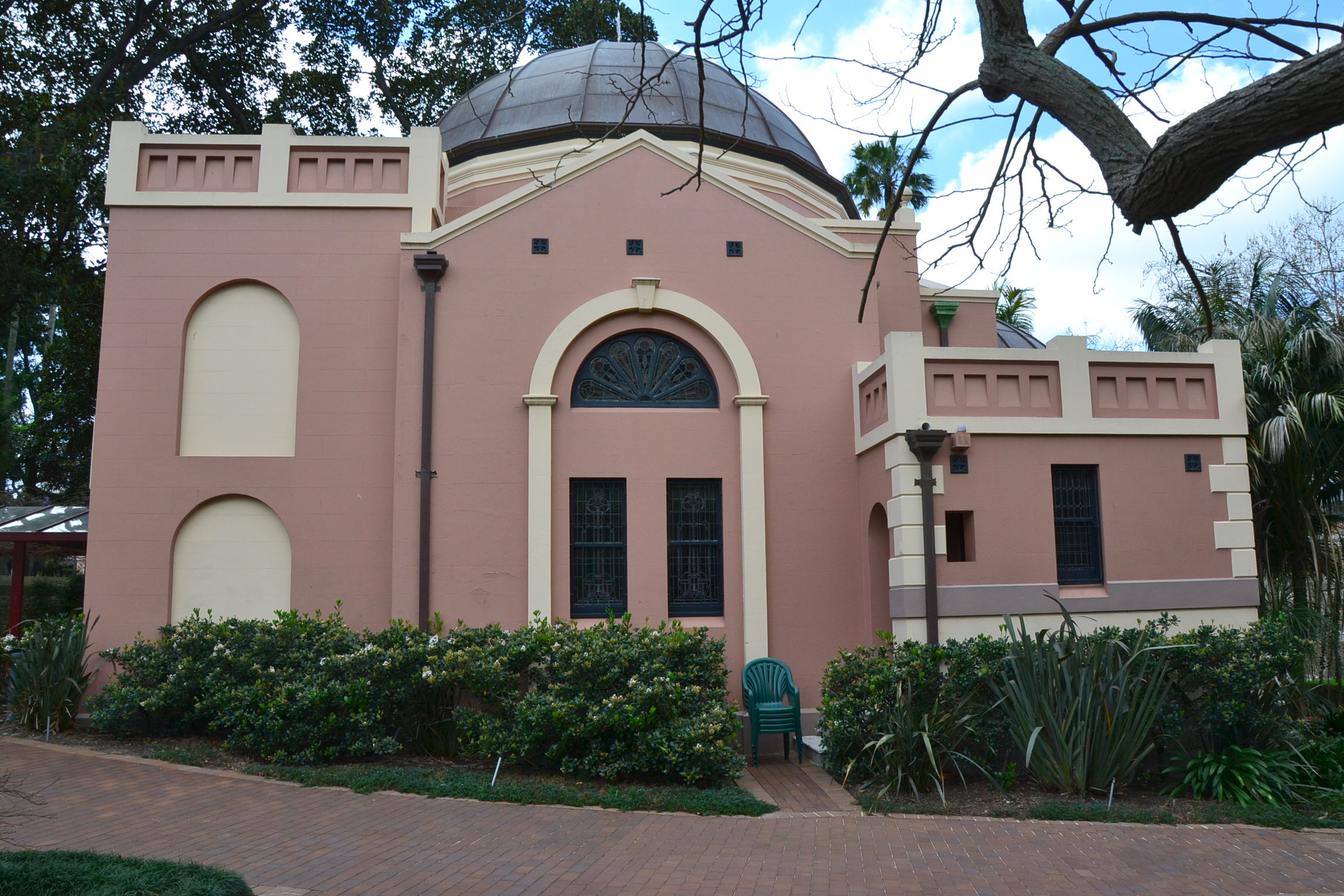
Chapel, Sacred Heart Health Service

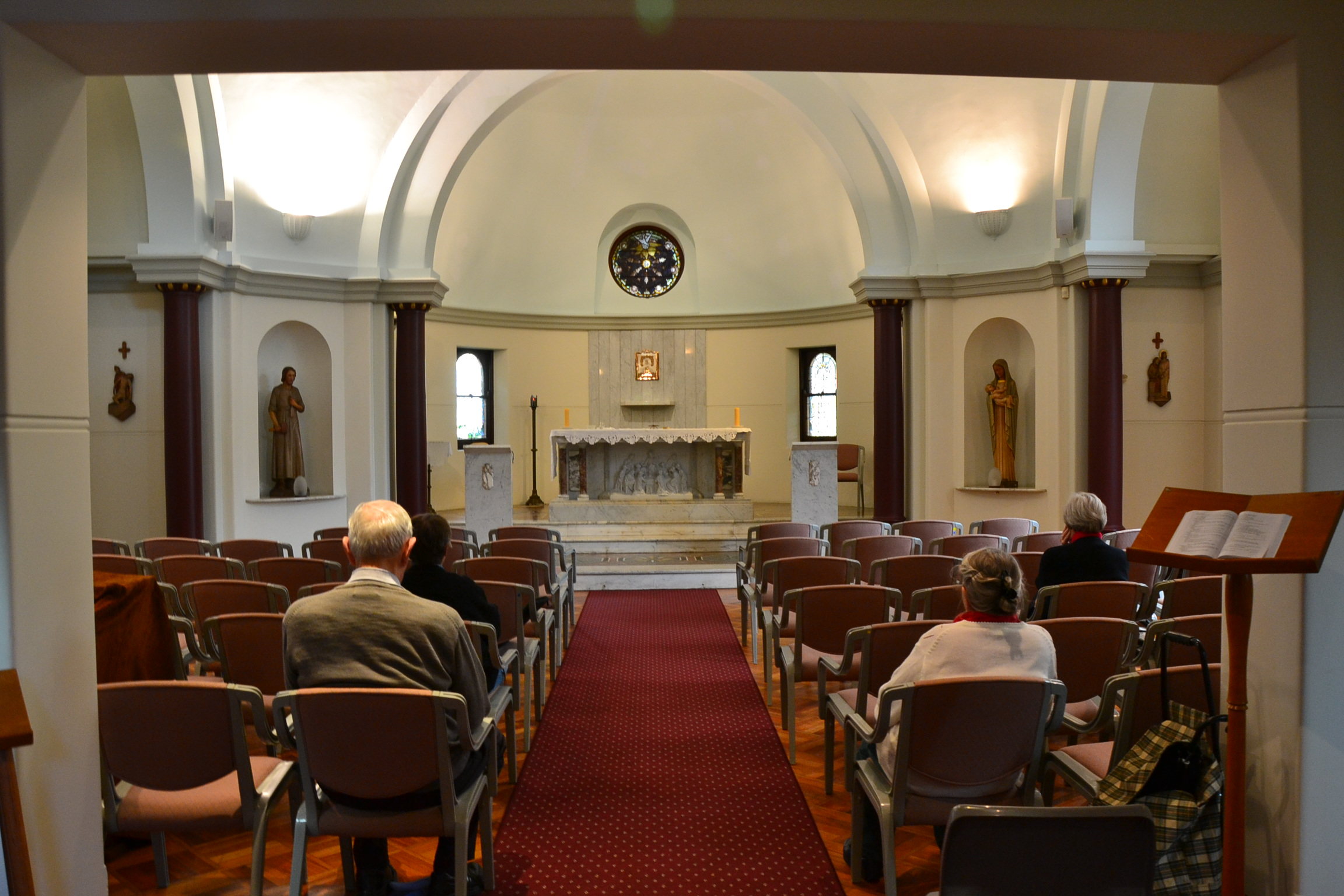
Chapel, Sacred Heart Health Service

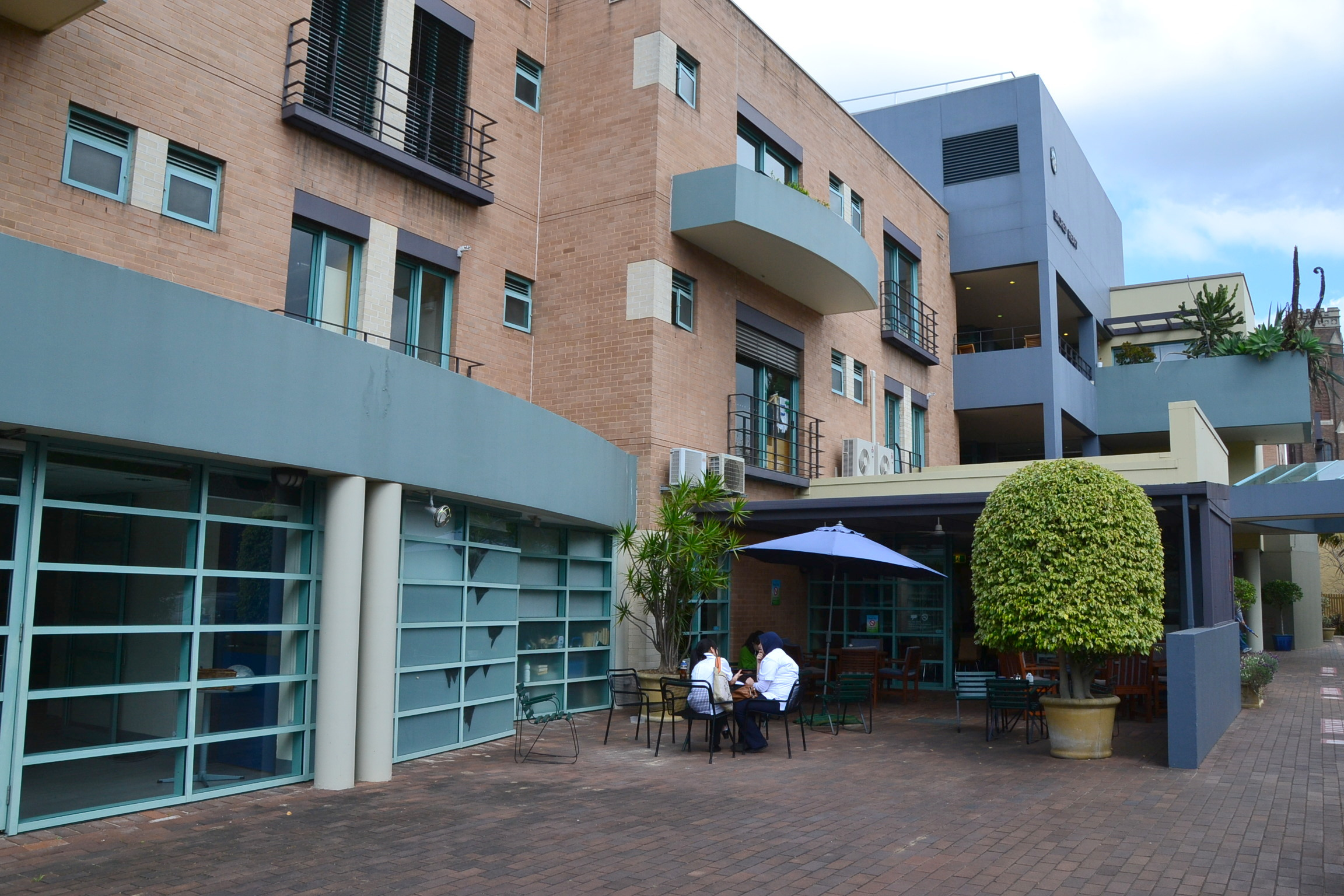
Sacred Heart Health Service

St Vincent's Hospital, Sydney is a leading tertiary referral hospital and research facility located in Darlinghurst, Sydney. Though funded and integrated into the New South Wales state public health system, it is operated by St Vincent's Health Australia. It is affiliated with the neighbouring University of Notre Dame Australia and the University of New South Wales Medical School.

== History ==
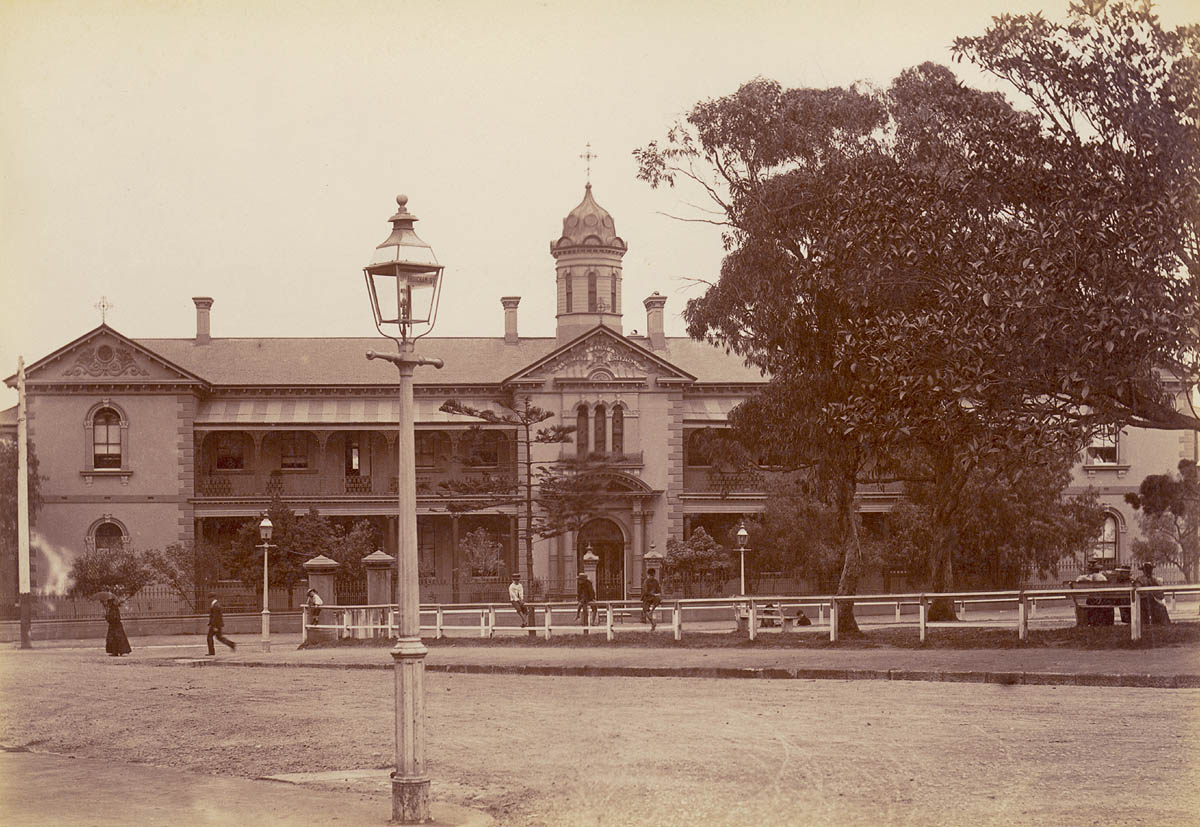
St Vincent's Hospital in the 1900s

=== Foundation ===
St Vincent's Hospital was established at Tarmons in 1857 by five Irish Sisters of Charity. Tarmons was a stately home in Potts Point, standing on a 5-acre (2.0 ha) block of land that had been purchased by Sir Maurice O'Connell in 1838. O'Connell named his mansion Tarmons (which means "sanctuary") after his extended family's home in County Kerry. The Sisters had migrated to Sydney in 1838 with a mission to help the poor and disadvantaged. Some of their early work included helping victims of the 1853 influenza outbreak and families of prisoners in the nearby Darlinghurst Gaol. Three of the hospital's founding sisters had trained as professional nurses in France, and they brought their knowledge to the colony; they established a hospital that was free for all people but founded especially for the poor on a non-sectarian basis.

The present hospital was founded in the neighbouring suburb of Potts Point, on a site which is now St Vincent's College. As demand grew, a new hospital with 150 beds, designed by architect Oswald Lewis, was built on its present site in Victoria Street, Darlinghurst, in 1870. The building was remodeled and enlarged after World War I; it is now known as the De Lacy Building, after one of the founding sisters.

=== Organ transplant ===
St Vincent's has carried out pioneering work in organ transplant, including heart and lungs.

The first Australian heart transplant was performed on 23 October 1968 by a team led by Harry Windsor on a 57-year-old, Richard Pye, who survived for 45 days after the operation.

The hospital was also the first Australian hospital to implement a successful cardiac transplant program. While Windsor led the team, the surgeon who conducted the first successful transplant in 1982 was Victor Chang, a Chinese-Australian cardiothoracic surgeon. One of the first patients to receive a new heart at St Vincent's was 14-year-old Fiona Coote who, on 7 April 1984, became Australia's youngest and first female heart transplant recipient at the time.

In 2014, the world's first contemporary dead (donation after circulatory death [DCD]) heart transplant was performed at St. Vincent's on 57-year-old Michelle Gribilar who was suffering from congenital heart failure. A few weeks later, 43-year-old Jan Damen, who also suffered from congenital heart failure, received the world's second dead heart transplant.

=== HIV/AIDS and IV drug treatment ===
The hospital was also one of the first health care facilities in Australia to begin treating AIDS patients when the epidemic reached Sydney in the early 1980s. This was a direct result of the hospital's close geographic position to the predominantly gay areas surrounding nearby Oxford Street and the injecting drug-using population of the notorious red-light district, Kings Cross. Dr. Ron Penny and Dr. David Cooper are credited with diagnosing the first patient with AIDS in Australia at St Vincent's in October 1982.

As the AIDS epidemic grew in Sydney, the hospital led the way in the compassionate treatment of the sick and the dying, continuing to apply the original values of the Sisters' mission. This early exposure to the frightening implications of a possible pandemic was responsible for St Vincent's becoming one of the leading centers of immunology research and practice in the world.

The hospital was also one of the first health care facilities in Australia to suggest the idea of a needle exchange program, in an effort to stem the spread of the virus among IV drug users in the local community, an idea that was highly controversial at the time, and raised the possibility of criminal charges against doctors and other health care workers who implemented it. The hospital instituted Australia's first needle exchange program in 1986.

The immunology ward of the hospital was strongly supported by the local gay community, who staged numerous charity events to raise money for AIDS care. However, on 24 November 2007, the hospital announced that this ward would be closed because beds allocated for HIV care were not being used due to advances in HIV treatment, resulting in fewer patients needing to be admitted for HIV/AIDS related conditions, and that such patients would in future be admitted to an oncology ward of the hospital. The decision was made only days before World AIDS Day on 1 December, and was protested. Hospital management held discussions with leaders of HIV/AIDS groups in Sydney, explaining the reasons for the ward closure, and highlighting an increase in outpatient and ambulatory care services that would be provided instead. The hospital leased the ward to the Royal Australian Navy while its Balmoral Navy Hospital was refurbished, using their own staff, but making use of St Vincent's pathology and radiology services.

=== 21st century expansion ===
In 1996, St Vincent's joined the Sisters of Charity Health Service, which already encompassed 17 other health care facilities and became Australia's largest not-for-profit health care provider.

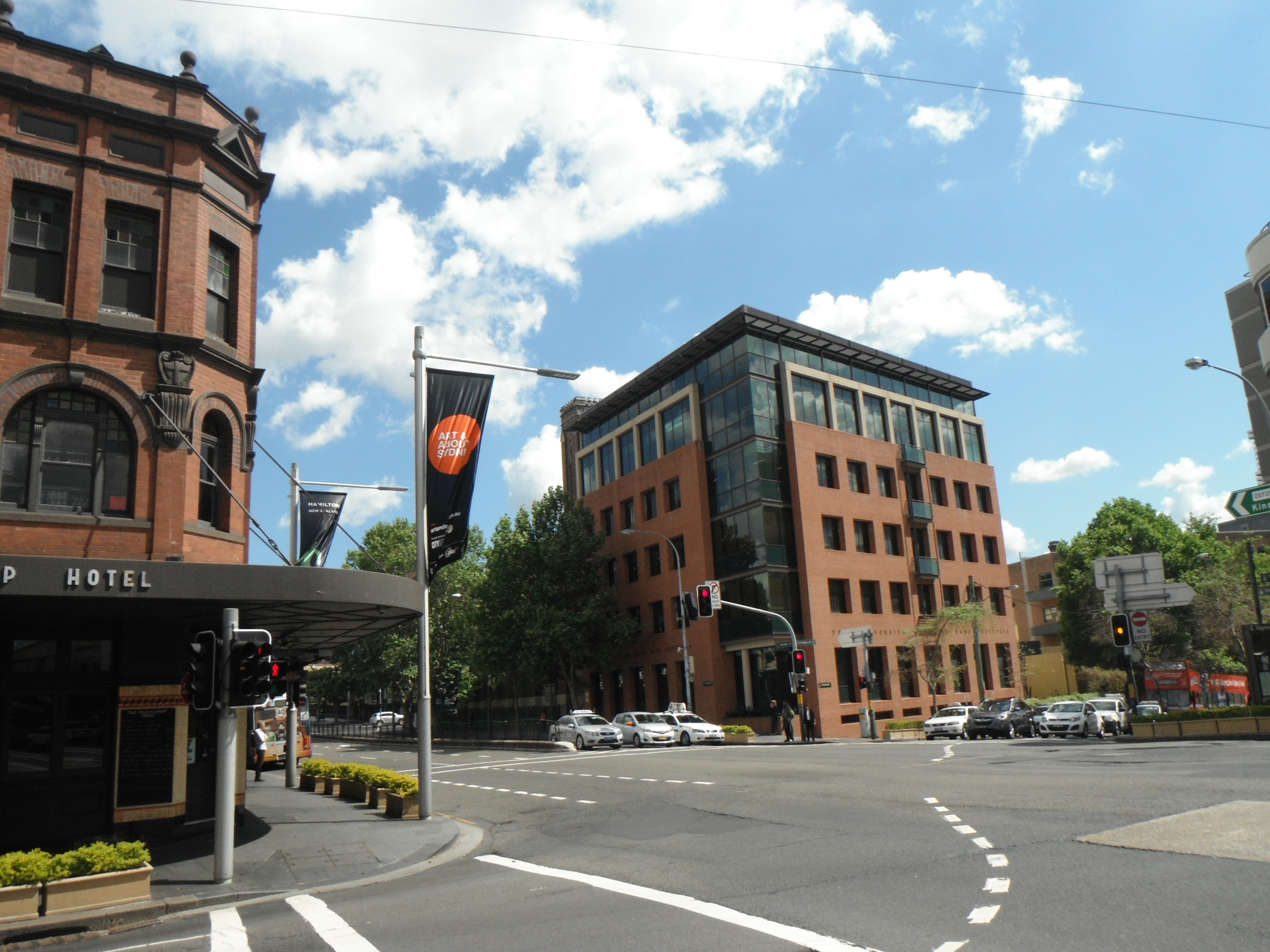
A University of Notre Dame Australia building forming part of the integrated healthcare campus

The hospital was extensively upgraded in 2001. The hospital is a primary teaching facility and offers a wide array of clinical experience to students studying medicine and nursing in particular. It was originally affiliated with the University of Sydney from 1923 to 1968 when it changed affiliation to the University of New South Wales. It also has links with the University of Technology, Sydney, Australian Catholic University, University of Tasmania and the University of Notre Dame Australia.

Forming part of the St Vincent's Local Hospital Network, the hospital became a facility of St Vincent's Health Australia.

In 2004 St Vincent's was forced to close beds because of inadequate government funding. From January to March 2007, an entire surgical ward was forced to close in order to cut costs.

In 2006, building work commenced on Stage 1 of the St Vincent's Research and Biotechnology Precinct, a joint partnership between the hospital, the Garvan Institute of Medical Research and the Victor Chang Cardiac Research Institute. Additional construction commenced in 2008 upon a new facility within the grounds of St Vincent's; it will encompass a mental health, drug and alcohol, and community health unit. In 2008, building work commenced on a new facility within the grounds of St Vincent's that will encompass a drugs and alcohol, mental health and community health unit.

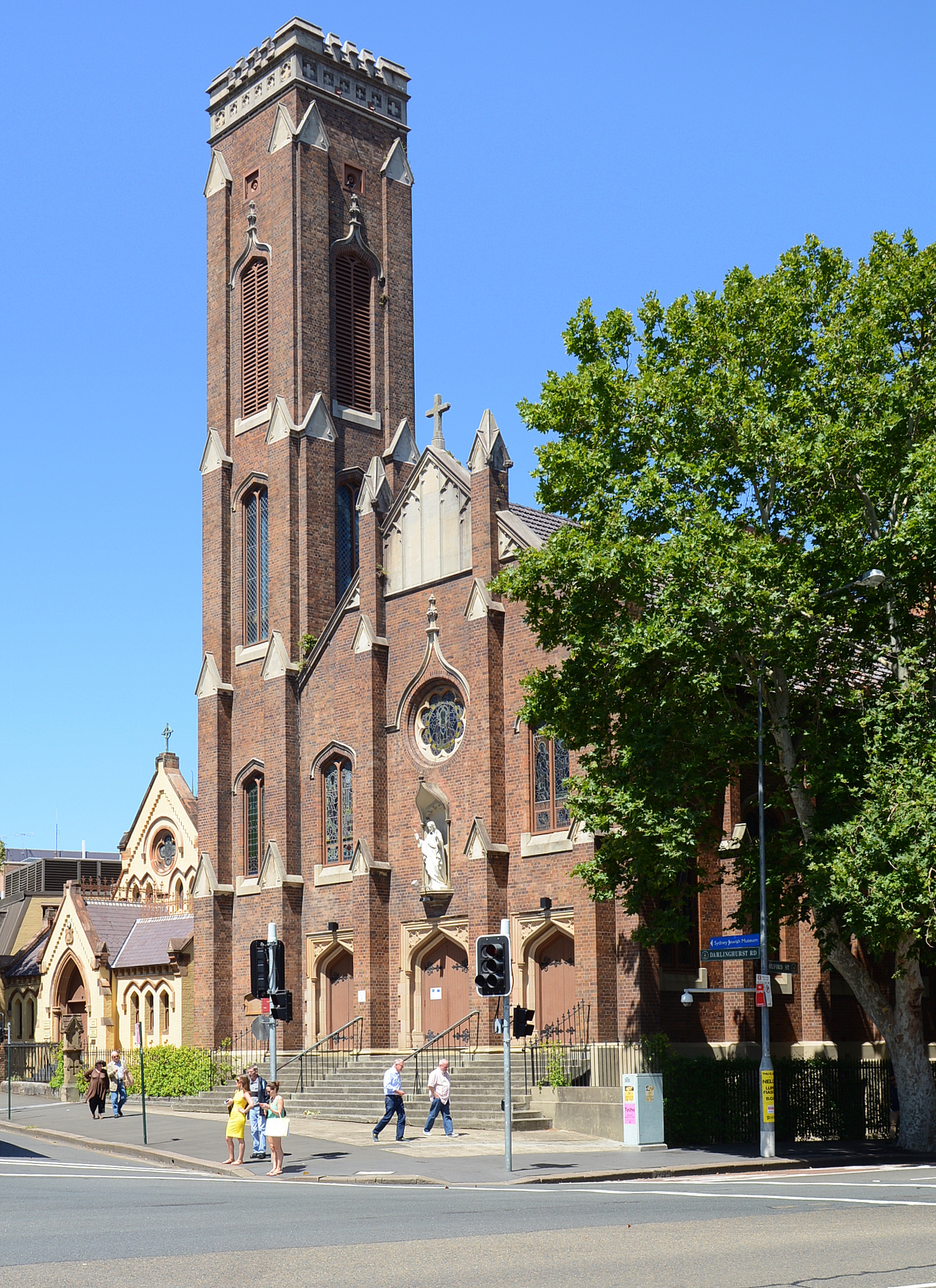
Sacred Heart Catholic Church, built in 1850, and the neighbouring Benedict XVI Medical Library

The University of Notre Dame Australia opened its Darlinghurst site in 2008, which is the home of the Sydney branches of its Schools of Medicine and Nursing. It is situated on the sites of the Sacred Heart Catholic Church and the Sacred Heart Hospice. It is co-located with the hospital and the Sacred Heart Health Service, and forms part of the wider St Vincent's Integrated Healthcare Campus. It is also home to a medical library named after Pope Benedict XVI who blessed the site following its opening.

In 2009, the Sisters of Charity transferred the stewardship of St Vincent's Health Australia to the Trustees of Mary Aikenhead Ministries.

== Services ==
=== Mental health and homeless care ===
In 2020 the emergency department was the first in Australia to implement a Psychiatric Emergency Care Centre (PECC), in response to the high number of people with a mental illness residing in the inner suburbs of Sydney, as well as the increasing incidence of people affected by illegal psychoactive drugs such as heroin, GHB and crystal meth.

In line with the Sisters' original mission, the hospital oversees the largest population of homeless people in Australia (many of whom also have a mental illness), concentrated in the neighbouring suburbs of Kings Cross, Surry Hills, and Woolloomooloo. The hospital's catchment area also includes some of Sydney's most affluent suburbs, including Vaucluse, Paddington, Bellevue Hill, Rose Bay, Point Piper and Darling Point.

=== Trauma care ===
St Vincent's is a recognised trauma centre, resulting in the majority of major trauma cases that occur in and around the inner city being referred to St Vincent's, despite Sydney Hospital being geographically closer to the Sydney central business district.

=== Emergency ===
St Vincent's Hospital was the first hospital in Australia to develop a specialised emergency department (ED) in 1983 under Dr. Gordian Fulde. Fulde was the third person to register for the examinations in emergency medicine established by the Royal College of Emergency Medicine in the United Kingdom in 1983, and the first person to pass them. Fulde was appointed the Director of Emergency in 1983 just a year prior to founding the Australasian College for Emergency Medicine in 1984, and he pioneered the development of specialised emergency medicine in Australia at St Vincent's ED. Fulde remained Director until 2016, making him the longest-serving director of an Australian ED. St Vincent's ED is regarded as having one of the busiest emergency departments in Australia, and is the reason why it features in the 2012-2015 Australian television series Kings Cross ER: St Vincent's Hospital.

=== Indigenous health ===
The hospital maintains a dedicated Aboriginal health unit. In June 2020 the hospital implemented a new Indigenous Flexi-Clinic aimed at improving the care of Aboriginal patients.

== Associated facilities ==
The Darlinghurst campus comprises St Vincent's Hospital, St Vincent's Private Hospital, Sacred Heart Hospice, the Garvan Institute of Medical Research, and the Victor Chang Cardiac Research Institute. The hospital has a sister affiliation with The Mater Hospital in North Sydney.

Given its proximity to these other facilities, St Vincent's has linkages with these research institutes and other facilities and has earned international recognition in the field of medical research. It is at the forefront of developing new therapies for the treatment of many diseases, including cancers, heart disease, HIV/AIDS, Parkinson's disease and Alzheimer's disease, arthritis, infectious diseases, asthma and diabetes.

Since 2008, the St Vincent's Centre for Applied Medical Research has operated a number of research programs that are engaged in research pertaining to immunology and cell biology, relevant to diseases such as cancer, HIV/AIDS and inflammatory disease. This center is a collaboration between St Vincent's Hospital and the University of New South Wales.

== St Vincent's Healthcare ==
As of April 2024 St Vincent's Healthcare operates three public hospitals and 10 private hospitals. The public hospitals are St Vincent's Sydney, St Vincent's Hospital, Melbourne, and Sacred Heart Health Service, which provides palliative care and rehabilitation services.

== Notable people ==
=== Notable doctors ===
- Lesley Campbell (endocrinologist)
- Victor Chang (cardiothoracic surgeon)
- David Cooper (immunologist)
- Kumud Dhital (cardiothoracic surgeon)
- Gordian Fulde (emergency physician)
- Ron Penny (immunologist)

=== Notable patients ===
Many notable people have died at St. Vincent's Hospital, including:

- Australian cricket player Victor Trumper
- Dame Nellie Melba
- Prime Minister Joseph Lyons
- Prime Minister John Gorton
- Australian cricket player Phillip Hughes
- Dr David Cooper, who first diagnosed HIV in Australia and went on to become a world authority on HIV
- Australian fashion designer Carla Zampatti
- Australian television presenter Jonathan Coleman
- Australian singer-songwriter and record producer Billy Thorpe
- Billionaire Kerry Packer
- Australian comedian and satirist Barry Humphries

== In the media ==
St. Vincent's Emergency Department features in the 2012–2015 Australian television series Kings Cross ER: St Vincent's Hospital.

In 2018, a five-time Lotto winner donated $50,000 to the hospital's cardiac services.

In July 2021, footage of patients in the hospital's intensive care unit infected with COVID-19 was released publicly showing the effects of COVID-19. The NSW Government used a photograph of an infected patient from the ward as part of its campaign to urge the public to stay home in an attempt to curb the spread of the Delta variant.

== Controversies ==
In 2016, a government-ordered review found the hospital made "factual errors" and "key omissions" after it was revealed that 78 patients, including 30 who had died, were under-dosed with the chemotherapy drug carboplatin, finding the public was misled on the treatment. In 2017, a parliamentary committee report investigating the chemotherapy dosing matter was leaked to the ABC, which reported that the committee could not discount the possibility there was a cover-up. The hospital rejected the claims within the report "in the strongest possible terms".

On 26 December 2021, SydPath (St Vincent's Pathology), admitted in a statement that more than 400 COVID-19 positive people were incorrectly notified that their PCR test results were negative on the previous night. Two days later, another 486 people who were issued a negative COVID-19 test result by SydPath have actually tested positive for the virus.

== See also ==
- Catholic Health Australia
- St Vincent's Hospital (Brisbane)
- St Vincent's Hospital, Melbourne
- List of hospitals in Australia
