= 2021 Australia national soccer team season =

- Season: 2021
- Manager: Graham Arnold
- Captain: Aziz Behich
- Matches played: 10
- Wins: 7
- Draws: 2
- Losses: 1
- Goals scored: 21 (2.1 per match)
- Goals against: 5
- Top goalscorer: Mitchell Duke (5)
- Most caps: Ajdin Hrustic (10)
- Players: 38
- Goalscorers: 11
- Debutants: 8
- Highest scoring: Australia 5–1 Chinese Taipei (7 June)
- Longest winning run: 7 matches (3 June – 7 October)
- Longest unbeaten run: 7 matches (3 June – 7 October)
- Longest winless run: 3 matches (12 October – 16 November)
- Longest losing run: 1 match (12 October)
- Highest attendance: 23,314; Australia 0–0 Saudi Arabia (11 November)
- Lowest attendance: 23,314; Australia 0–0 Saudi Arabia (11 November)
- Average attendance: 23,314
Home colours	Away colours

This page summarises the Australia men's national soccer team fixtures and results in 2021.

== Summary ==
The 2022 World Cup and 2023 AFC Asian Cup qualification matches were postponed from 2020 to 2021 as a result of the ongoing COVID-19 pandemic. Australia had also accepted an invitation to participate in the 2020 Copa América as a guest nation, but this competition was also postponed to 2021, and Australia subsequently withdrew.

Australia played half of the qualifiers in the second round of the qualifiers for the 2022 World Cup and the 2023 Asian Cup in 2019. Following these four matches, they sat first place in the group having won all the matches, scoring 16 goals and conceding only one goal to Chinese Taipei. The remaining matches were postponed due to the COVID-19 pandemic in Asia and rescheduled to be played in June 2021 in Kuwait as a centralised venue.

On 3 June, Australia played their first match after 567 days without playing, beating Kuwait 3–0 in the Asian qualifiers. Acting captain Mathew Leckie headed in the opener, Jackson Irvine scored the second from a rebound of a saved penalty, and Ajdin Hrustic scored the third from a free kick. The game also had 3 national team debutants, with Fran Karacic starting the match and Kenny Dougall and Riley McGree being substituted on from the bench. Four days later, Australia beat Chinese Taipei, marking six consecutive victories for the first time in 20 years. In the first half Harry Souttar and captain Trent Sainsbury headed goals either side of Jamie Maclaren's penalty and Mitchell Duke scored a brace in the second half either side of Chinese Taipei's goal, scored by Gao Wei-jie. In the game Denis Genreau, Connor Metcalfe, and Ruon Tongyik were handed their international debuts. Four days later, Australia extended their winning streak to seven consecutive victories, marking the first time in 24 years, beating Nepal 3–0 and securing the top place in their group. In the first half Leckie scored a header before assisting Karacic's maiden international goal and in the second half Martin Boyle scored the third goal before Lawrence Thomas was substituted on to make his international debut. After another four days, Australia beat Jordan 1–0 thanks to a header by Souttar. This win marked the first time in history that they won eight consecutive matches in a World Cup campaign.

After finishing top of the group in the second and qualifying for the 2023 AFC Asian Cup, in the last few months of the year, Australia began the third round of the qualifiers for the 2022 World Cup. On 2 September, Australia "hosted" China at a neutral venue in Qatar due to quarantine restrictions because of the COVID-19 pandemic in Australia. They won the match 3–0, with Awer Mabil, Boyle, and Duke scoring, while Callum Elder made his international debut. A few days later, Australia travelled to Vietnam where Rhyan Grant scored his first international goal to give Australia a 1–0 victory. It was their tenth consecutive win, which broke the record of the best run of form in the Asian Football Confederation. One month later, on 7 October, Australia beat Oman at a neutral venue in Qatar due to the quarantine restrictions. Mabil, Boyle, and Duke scored for Australia while Rabia Al-Alawi scored for Oman. It was their eleventh consecutive victory, breaking the world record for a run of form in World Cup qualification. A few days later, Australia's winning streak was broken when Japan beat them 2–1 at Saitama Stadium 2002. Ao Tanaka scored early for Japan, Hrustic equalised from a free kick, and Japan won due to an own goal by Aziz Behich near the end of the match. In November 2021, Australia played their first home game in over two years and were held to a scoreless draw by Saudi Arabia. Five days later, Australia played China again at a neutral venue in the United Arab Emirates with China the "host". In this fixture, the teams drew 1–1, with Duke heading home Australia's goal in the first half before Wu Lei equalised from the penalty spot during the second half.

== Record ==
As of match played 16 November 2021

Type	GP	W	D	L	GF	GA
Friendly	0	0	0	0	0	0
World Cup & Asian Cup qualifiers	10	7	2	1	21	5
Total	10	7	2	1	21	5

== Match results ==
=== World Cup and Asian Cup qualifiers ===
3 June 2021 Round 2	Australia	3–0	Kuwait	Kuwait City, Kuwait
21:30 UTC+3	Leckie 1'; Irvine 24'; Hrustic 66'	Report		Stadium: Jaber Al-Ahmad International Stadium; Attendance: 0 (Note: Due to the COVID-19 pandemic in Asia, the match was played behind closed doors.); Referee: Jumpei Iida (Japan)

7 June 2021 Round 2	Australia	5–1	Chinese Taipei	Kuwait City, Kuwait
19:30 UTC+3	Souttar 12'; Maclaren 27' (pen.); Sainsbury 41'; Duke 46', 84'	Report	Gao Wei-jie 62'	Stadium: Jaber Al-Ahmad International Stadium; Attendance: 0 Referee: Saoud Al-Adba (Qatar)

11 June 2021 Round 2	Nepal	0–3	Australia	Kuwait City, Kuwait
19:30 UTC+3		Report	Leckie 6'; Karacic 38'; Boyle 57'	Stadium: Al Kuwait Sports Club Stadium; Attendance: 0 Referee: Ahmed Al-Kaf (Oman)

15 June 2021 Round 2	Australia	1–0	Jordan	Kuwait City, Kuwait
21:30 UTC+3	Souttar 77'	Report		Stadium: Jaber Al-Ahmad International Stadium; Attendance: 0 Referee: Kim Woo-Sung (South Korea)

2 September 2021 Round 3	Australia	3–0	China	Doha, Qatar
21:00 UTC+3	Mabil 24'; Boyle 26'; Duke 70'	Report		Stadium: Khalifa International Stadium; Attendance: 0 Referee: Ko Hyung-jin (South Korea)

7 September 2021 Round 3	Vietnam	0–1	Australia	Hanoi, Vietnam
19:00 UTC+7		Report	Grant 43'	Stadium: Mỹ Đình National Stadium; Attendance: 0 Referee: Abdulrahman Al-Jassim (Qatar)

7 October 2021 Round 3	Australia	3–1	Oman	Doha, Qatar
21:30 UTC+3	Mabil 9'; Boyle 49'; Duke 89'	Report	Al-Alawi 28'	Stadium: Khalifa International Stadium; Attendance: 0 Referee: Nawaf Shukralla (Bahrain)

12 October 2021 Round 3	Japan	2–1	Australia	Saitama, Japan
19:14 UTC+9	Tanaka 8'; Behich 85' (o.g.)	Report	Hrustic 70'	Stadium: Saitama Stadium 2002; Attendance: 14,437; Referee: Abdulrahman Al-Jassim (Qatar)

11 November 2021 Round 3	Australia	0–0	Saudi Arabia	Sydney, Australia
20:05 UTC+11		Report		Stadium: Western Sydney Stadium; Attendance: 23,314; Referee: Ko Hyung-jin (South Korea)

16 November 2021 Round 3	China	1–1	Australia	Sharjah, United Arab Emirates
19:00 UTC+4	Wu Lei 71' (pen.)	Report	Duke 38'	Stadium: Sharjah Stadium; Attendance: 1,050; Referee: Adham Makhadmeh (Jordan)

== Player statistics ==
Correct as of 16 November 2021 (v. China).
Numbers are listed by player's number in last match played

No.	Pos	Nat	Player	Total		Friendlies		World Cup qualifiers	
No.	Pos	Nat	Player	Apps	Goals	Apps	Goals	Apps	Goals
1	GK	(Australia) AUS	Mathew Ryan	8	0	0+0	0	8+0	0
12	GK	(Australia) AUS	Andrew Redmayne	1	0	0+0	0	1+0	0
12	GK	(Australia) AUS	Lawrence Thomas	1	0	0+0	0	0+1	0
18	GK	(Australia) AUS	Danny Vukovic	1	0	0+0	0	1+0	0
2	DF	(Australia) AUS	Milos Degenek	5	0	0+0	0	4+1	0
3	DF	(Australia) AUS	Brad Smith	1	0	0+0	0	1+0	0
3	DF	(Australia) AUS	Callum Elder	1	0	0+0	0	0+1	0
4	DF	(Australia) AUS	Rhyan Grant	8	1	0+0	0	7+1	1
5	DF	(Australia) AUS	Fran Karacic	6	1	0+0	0	3+3	1
5	DF	(Australia) AUS	Ryan McGowan	1	0	0+0	0	1+0	0
8	DF	(Australia) AUS	Bailey Wright	0	0	0+0	0	0+0	0
14	DF	(Australia) AUS	Connor Metcalfe	2	0	0+0	0	1+1	0
16	DF	(Australia) AUS	Aziz Behich	9	0	0+0	0	8+1	0
19	DF	(Australia) AUS	Harry Souttar	8	2	0+0	0	8+0	2
20	DF	(Australia) AUS	Trent Sainsbury	8	1	0+0	0	8+0	1
23	DF	(Australia) AUS	Curtis Good	1	0	0+0	0	1+0	0
23	DF	(Australia) AUS	Ruon Tongyik	2	0	0+0	0	0+2	0
5	MF	(Australia) AUS	James Holland	2	0	0+0	0	1+1	0
7	MF	(Australia) AUS	James Jeggo	6	0	0+0	0	2+4	0
10	MF	(Australia) AUS	Ajdin Hrustic	10	2	0+0	0	9+1	2
13	MF	(Australia) AUS	Aaron Mooy	4	0	0+0	0	1+3	0
14	MF	(Australia) AUS	Brandon Borrello	1	0	0+0	0	1+0	0
14	MF	(Australia) AUS	Kenny Dougall	4	0	0+0	0	2+2	0
17	MF	(Australia) AUS	Denis Genreau	1	0	0+0	0	1+0	0
21	MF	(Australia) AUS	Daniel Arzani	0	0	0+0	0	0+0	0
21	MF	(Australia) AUS	Riley McGree	7	0	0+0	0	2+5	0
22	MF	(Australia) AUS	Jackson Irvine	9	1	0+0	0	9+0	1
23	MF	(Australia) AUS	Tom Rogic	4	0	0+0	0	4+0	0
23	MF	(Australia) AUS	Gianni Stensness	0	0	0+0	0	0+0	0
6	FW	(Australia) AUS	Martin Boyle	8	3	0+0	0	8+0	3
7	FW	(Australia) AUS	Mathew Leckie	4	2	0+0	0	4+0	2
9	FW	(Australia) AUS	Jamie Maclaren	4	1	0+0	0	2+2	1
9	FW	(Australia) AUS	Adam Taggart	5	0	0+0	0	4+1	0
11	FW	(Australia) AUS	Awer Mabil	9	2	0+0	0	5+4	2
13	FW	(Australia) AUS	Nikita Rukavytsya	3	0	0+0	0	0+3	0
15	FW	(Australia) AUS	Mitchell Duke	9	5	0+0	0	3+6	5
17	FW	(Australia) AUS	Andrew Nabbout	1	0	0+0	0	0+1	0
17	FW	(Australia) AUS	Chris Ikonomidis	3	0	0+0	0	0+3	0
