= 2022 Australia national soccer team season =

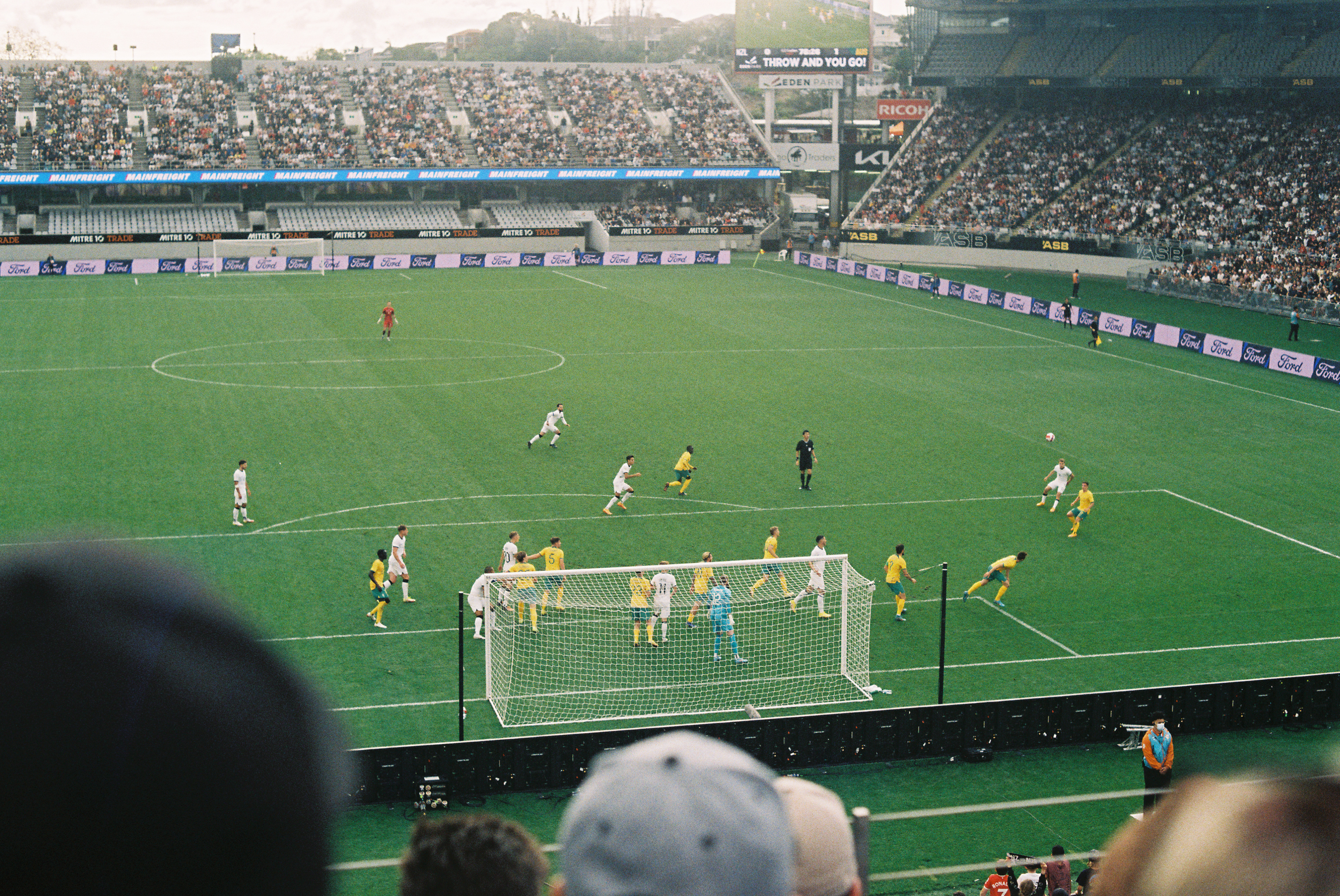
- Australia playing New Zealand at Eden Park, New Zealand
- Season: 2022
- Manager: Graham Arnold
- Captain: Mathew Ryan
- Matches played: 13
- Wins: 7
- Draws: 2
- Losses: 4
- Goals scored: 17 (1.31 per match)
- Goals against: 13
- Top goalscorer: 4 players (2 each)
- Most caps: Mathew Ryan (12)
- Biggest home win: Australia 4–0 Vietnam (27 January)
- Biggest away win: New Zealand 0–2 Australia (25 September)
- Highest scoring: France 4–1 Australia (22 November)
- Longest winning run: 2 matches (3 occasions)
- Longest unbeaten run: 5 matches (1 June – 25 September)
- Longest winless run: 3 matches (1 February – 29 March)
- Longest losing run: 2 matches (24–29 March)
- Highest attendance: 41,852; Australia 0–2 Japan (24 March)
- Lowest attendance: 25,392; Australia 1–0 New Zealand (22 September)
- Average attendance: 31,661
Home colours	Away colours

This page summarises the Australia men's national soccer team fixtures and results in 2022.

== Summary ==
Australia played most of the qualifiers in the third round of the qualifiers for the 2022 World Cup in 2021. Following these six matches, they sat third place in the group having won half the matches, needing to win all four of their remaining matches to secure automatic qualification and avoid a play-off. Ahead of their first match of the year, coach Graham Arnold tested positive for COVID-19 and was forced to isolate, while Ajdin Hrustic was suspended for the game and Aziz Behich got stranded due to a blizzard and couldn't fly to Melbourne. Despite the setbacks, Australia beat Vietnam 4–0, with Jamie Maclaren and Tom Rogic opening the scoring in the first half, and substitutes Craig Goodwin and Riley McGree both scoring their first senior international goals in the second half. Joel King made his senior international debut, starting instead of Behich at the left-back position, while attacker Marco Tilio was substituted on to make his debut. With the return of coach Arnold, Behich, and Hrustic, McGree tested positive for COVID-19 and missed the second match of the year. Australia drew 2–2 with Oman, leading twice firstly from a Maclaren penalty and in the second half from a goal by Aaron Mooy. Oman drew back both times with goals by Abdullah Fawaz, leaving Australia 3 points behind Japan and 4 points behind Saudi Arabia, forcing them to beat both these nations in their final games to have a chance to qualify automatically. In their third match of the year, Australia lost 2–0 to Japan after Kaoru Mitoma scored at the end of regular time and in injury time. This loss denied Australia the chance to qualify directly, and regardless of their final group match result finished third in the group and advanced to an Asian play-off against the third placed team of the other group. Australia lost the final group match against Saudi Arabia 1–0 with Salem Al-Dawsari scoring the only goal from the penalty spot. The final group day also confirmed Australia's opponents for the Asian play-off and possible interconfederational play-off. Ahead of the Asian play-off, Australia scheduled a friendly match against Jordan in Doha. Jordan opened the scoring thanks to a goal by Musa Al-Taamari, but Australia came back from behind to win 2–1, with Bailey Wright and Awer Mabil scoring. Australia won the Asian play-off 2–1 against the United Arab Emirates to qualify for the inter-confederation play-off. Jackson Irvine scored the opening goal and Hrustic scored the winning goal after Caio Canedo equalised. The inter-confederation play-off against Peru ended in a goalless draw after extra time and was decided by penalties. Arnold substituted Andrew Redmayne into the game at the end of extra-time to replace captain and regular starting goalkeeper Mathew Ryan. The tactic succeeded as Redmayne saved Peru's Alex Valera's penalty after Martin Boyle had his penalty saved and Peru's Luis Advíncula missed. Australia won the penalty shoot-out 5–4 and qualified for the World Cup's group stage, being placed in the group with Tunisia, France, and Denmark, having faced the last two at the last World Cup.

Australia celebrated a centenary for the national team, with the 100th anniversary on 17 June 2022. To mark the occasion, they scheduled a two-game friendly series against New Zealand, with the first game played at home in Brisbane and the second game away in Auckland. Australia won the first game 1–0, with Mabil scoring the only goal from long distance. In the second game, Australia handed debuts to Harrison Delbridge, Jason Cummings, Ryan Strain, Cameron Devlin, Garang Kuol, and Keanu Baccus. They won the game 2–0 with veteran Mitchell Duke scoring the first goal and debutant Cummings scoring a penalty for the second.

Australia opened their group stage of the 2022 World Cup against defending champions France. They opened the match positively, attacking often and Goodwin scoring his second international goal to give Australia the lead. Unfortunately, France were ultimately too strong a team and Australia lost 4–1 after French players Adrien Rabiot and Kylian Mbappé scored a goal each and Olivier Giroud scored a brace, making him France's men's joint top goalscorer. In their second match, Australia beat Tunisia 1–0, with Duke heading in the only goal. He celebrated the goal by signing the letter J, dedicating it to his son Jaxson, who was sitting in the stands. In the third match against Denmark, a draw would've been enough to ensure qualification to the knockout stage so long as France didn't lose to Tunisia, while a victory would ensure the progression. While France played a second string team that lost to Tunisia, Australia beat Denmark 1–0 thanks to a strong defence and a 60th minute individual goal by Mathew Leckie that sent them to the round of 16 for only the second time in history. In the round of 16, Australia lost 2–1 to Argentina with Lionel Messi opening the scoring and Julián Álvarez getting the second after dispossessing Mathew Ryan. Australia pulled one back with Goodwin's shot deflected into goal off Enzo Fernández and Kuol almost scored the equaliser in injury time, but his shot was smothered by Argentinian goalkeeper Emiliano Martínez.

== Record ==
As of match played 3 December 2022

Type	GP	W	D	L	GF	GA
Friendly	3	3	0	0	5	1
World Cup qualifiers	6	2	2	2	8	6
World Cup	4	2	0	2	4	6
Total	13	7	2	4	17	13

== Match results ==
=== Friendlies ===
This section is for matches confirmed by Football Australia, please do not add speculative fixtures.

1 June 2022	Australia	2–1	Jordan	Doha, Qatar
21:00 UTC+3	Wright 40'; Mabil 68'	Report	Al-Taamari 17'	Stadium: Al Janoub Stadium; Attendance: 0 (behind closed doors); Referee: Saad Kamil Al-Fadhli (Kuwait)

22 September 2022 Centenary celebration	Australia	1–0	New Zealand	Brisbane, Australia
20:00 UTC+10	Mabil 32'	Report		Stadium: Suncorp Stadium; Attendance: 25,392; Referee: Ryuji Sato (Japan)

25 September 2022 Centenary celebration	New Zealand	0–2	Australia	Auckland, New Zealand
16:00 UTC+12		Report	Duke 54'; Cummings 80' (pen.)	Stadium: Eden Park; Attendance: 34,985; Referee: Yusuke Araki (Japan)

=== World Cup qualifiers ===
27 January 2022 Round 3	Australia	4–0	Vietnam	Melbourne, Australia
20:10 UTC+11	Maclaren 30'; Rogic 45+2'; Goodwin 72'; McGree 77'	Report		Stadium: Melbourne Rectangular Stadium; Attendance: 27,740; Referee: Ko Hyung-jin (South Korea)

1 February 2022 Round 3	Oman	2–2	Australia	Muscat, Oman
20:00 UTC+4	Fawaz 54', 89' (pen.)	Report	Maclaren 15' (pen.); Mooy 79'	Stadium: Sultan Qaboos Sports Complex; Attendance: 0 Referee: Mohammed Abdulla Hassan Mohamed (United Arab Emirates)

24 March 2022 Round 3	Australia	0–2	Japan	Sydney, Australia
20:10 UTC+11		Report	Mitoma 89', 90+3'	Stadium: Stadium Australia; Attendance: 41,852; Referee: Nawaf Shukralla (Bahrain)

29 March 2022 Round 3	Saudi Arabia	1–0	Australia	Jeddah, Saudi Arabia
21:00 UTC+3	Al-Dawsari 65' (pen.)	Report		Stadium: King Abdullah Sports City; Attendance: 51,433; Referee: Adham Makhadmeh (Jordan)

7 June 2022 Round 4	United Arab Emirates	1–2	Australia	Al Rayyan, Qatar
21:00 UTC+3	Caio 57'	Report	Irvine 53'; Hrustic 84'	Stadium: Ahmad bin Ali Stadium; Referee: Ilgiz Tantashev (Uzbekistan)

13 June 2022 Inter-confederation play-off	Australia	0–0 (a.e.t.) (5–4 p)	Peru	Al Rayyan, Qatar
21:00 UTC+3		Report		Stadium: Ahmad bin Ali Stadium; Referee: Slavko Vinčić (Slovenia)
	Penalties
	Boyle (penalty missed); Mooy (penalty scored); Goodwin (penalty scored); Hrustic (penalty scored); Maclaren (penalty scored); Mabil (penalty scored)		(penalty scored) Lapadula; (penalty scored) Callens; (penalty missed) Advíncula; (penalty scored) Tapia; (penalty scored) Flores; (penalty missed) Valera

=== World Cup ===
22 November 2022 Group Stage	France	4–1	Australia	Al Wakrah, Qatar
22:00 UTC+3	Rabiot 27'; Giroud 32', 71'; Mbappé 68'	Report	Goodwin 9'	Stadium: Al Janoub Stadium; Attendance: 40,875; Referee: Victor Gomes (South Africa)

26 November 2022 Group Stage	Tunisia	0–1	Australia	Al Wakrah, Qatar
13:00 UTC+3		Report	Duke 23'	Stadium: Al Janoub Stadium; Attendance: 41,823; Referee: Daniel Siebert (Germany)

30 November 2022 Group Stage	Australia	1–0	Denmark	Al Wakrah, Qatar
18:00 UTC+3	Leckie 60'	Report		Stadium: Al Janoub Stadium; Attendance: 41,232; Referee: Mustapha Ghorbal (Algeria)

3 December 2022 Round of 16	Argentina	2–1	Australia	Al Rayyan, Qatar
22:00 UTC+3	Messi 35'; Álvarez 57'	Report	Fernández 77' (o.g.)	Stadium: Ahmad bin Ali Stadium; Attendance: 45,032; Referee: Szymon Marciniak (Poland)

== Player statistics ==
Correct as of 3 December 2022 (v. Argentina).
Numbers are listed by player's number in last match played

No.	Pos	Nat	Player	Total		Friendlies		World Cup qualifiers		World Cup	
No.	Pos	Nat	Player	Apps	Goals	Apps	Goals	Apps	Goals	Apps	Goals
1	GK	(Australia) AUS	Mathew Ryan	12	0	2+0	0	6+0	0	4+0	0
12	GK	(Australia) AUS	Andrew Redmayne	2	0	1+0	0	0+1	0	0+0	0
18	GK	(Australia) AUS	Danny Vukovic	0	0	0+0	0	0+0	0	0+0	0
18	GK	(Australia) AUS	Mitchell Langerak	0	0	0+0	0	0+0	0	0+0	0
2	DF	(Australia) AUS	Miloš Degenek	9	0	1+0	0	3+1	0	2+2	0
3	DF	(Australia) AUS	Nathaniel Atkinson	6	0	1+1	0	3+0	0	1+0	0
4	DF	(Australia) AUS	Kye Rowles	7	0	1+0	0	2+0	0	4+0	0
4	DF	(Australia) AUS	Rhyan Grant	1	0	0+0	0	1+0	0	0+0	0
4	DF	(Australia) AUS	Ryan McGowan	1	0	0+0	0	0+1	0	0+0	0
5	DF	(Australia) AUS	Fran Karačić	7	0	2+0	0	2+1	0	1+1	0
5	DF	(Australia) AUS	Ryan Strain	1	0	0+1	0	0+0	0	0+0	0
7	DF	(Australia) AUS	Alex Wilkinson	0	0	0+0	0	0+0	0	0+0	0
8	DF	(Australia) AUS	Bailey Wright	4	1	1+0	1	2+0	0	0+1	0
16	DF	(Australia) AUS	Aziz Behich	10	0	1+1	0	4+0	0	4+0	0
19	DF	(Australia) AUS	Harry Souttar	4	0	0+0	0	0+0	0	4+0	0
19	DF	(Australia) AUS	Jason Davidson	1	0	1+0	0	0+0	0	0+0	0
20	DF	(Australia) AUS	Thomas Deng	1	0	1+0	0	0+0	0	0+0	0
20	DF	(Australia) AUS	Trent Sainsbury	5	0	1+0	0	4+0	0	0+0	0
24	DF	(Australia) AUS	Joel King	4	0	1+1	0	2+0	0	0+0	0
26	DF	(Australia) AUS	Harrison Delbridge	1	0	1+0	0	0+0	0	0+0	0
5	MF	(Australia) AUS	James Jeggo	4	0	0+0	0	1+3	0	0+0	0
10	MF	(Australia) AUS	Ajdin Hrustic	10	1	1+1	0	4+1	1	0+3	0
10	MF	(Australia) AUS	Denis Genreau	3	0	1+1	0	1+0	0	0+0	0
11	MF	(Australia) AUS	Brandon Borrello	0	0	0+0	0	0+0	0	0+0	0
13	MF	(Australia) AUS	Aaron Mooy	10	1	2+0	0	4+0	1	4+0	0
14	MF	(Australia) AUS	Riley McGree	8	1	2+1	0	0+1	1	4+0	0
17	MF	(Australia) AUS	Gianni Stensness	2	0	0+0	0	2+0	0	0+0	0
17	MF	(Australia) AUS	Cameron Devlin	1	0	0+1	0	0+0	0	0+0	0
22	MF	(Australia) AUS	Jackson Irvine	10	1	1+1	0	4+0	1	4+0	0
22	MF	(Australia) AUS	Tyrese Francois	0	0	0+0	0	0+0	0	0+0	0
23	MF	(Australia) AUS	Craig Goodwin	9	2	1+0	0	1+3	1	3+1	1
23	MF	(Australia) AUS	Tom Rogic	2	1	0+0	0	2+0	1	0+0	0
23	MF	(Australia) AUS	Connor Metcalfe	3	0	1+1	0	1+0	0	0+0	0
23	MF	(Australia) AUS	Kenny Dougall	1	0	1+0	0	0+0	0	0+0	0
26	MF	(Australia) AUS	Keanu Baccus	5	0	0+1	0	0+0	0	1+3	0
6	FW	(Australia) AUS	Marco Tilio	5	0	1+1	0	0+3	0	0+0	0
7	FW	(Australia) AUS	Mathew Leckie	10	1	1+1	0	4+0	0	4+0	1
9	FW	(Australia) AUS	Jamie Maclaren	10	2	0+2	0	2+3	2	0+3	0
9	FW	(Australia) AUS	Bruno Fornaroli	2	0	0+0	0	1+1	0	0+0	0
9	FW	(Australia) AUS	Martin Boyle	7	0	1+0	0	6+0	0	0+0	0
11	FW	(Australia) AUS	Awer Mabil	8	2	2+0	2	2+2	0	0+2	0
15	FW	(Australia) AUS	Mitchell Duke	10	2	1+0	1	2+3	0	4+0	1
15	FW	(Australia) AUS	Nicholas D'Agostino	2	0	1+0	0	0+1	0	0+0	0
19	FW	(Australia) AUS	Adam Taggart	1	0	1+0	0	0+0	0	0+0	0
21	FW	(Australia) AUS	Garang Kuol	3	0	0+1	0	0+0	0	0+2	0
22	FW	(Australia) AUS	Ben Folami	1	0	0+0	0	1+0	0	0+0	0
25	FW	(Australia) AUS	Jason Cummings	2	1	0+1	1	0+0	0	0+1	0
