= 2018 Australia national soccer team season =

Australia
2018 season
- Chairman: Steven Lowy; Chris Nikou (from November 2018)
- Manager: Bert van Marwijk; Graham Arnold (from July 2018)
Home colours	Away colours

This page summarises the Australia national soccer team fixtures and results in 2018.

== Summary ==
Australia participated in the 2018 FIFA World Cup, held in Russia in June and July. The draw took place in Moscow on 1 December 2017, with Australia drawn in Group C alongside France, Peru, and Denmark.

On 25 January 2018, the FFA appointed Bert van Marwijk on a short-term contract for the 2018 FIFA World Cup.

On 8 March 2018 the FFA announced that Graham Arnold would take over the head coach position from van Marwijk at the conclusion of the World Cup and will continue in the role until the 2022 FIFA World Cup.

On 24 March 2018, Australia played their first match under the management of van Marwijk, playing a friendly against Norway at Ullevaal Stadion in Oslo. Van Marwijk reverted from Ange Postecoglou's favoured formation of three-at-the-back to the more traditional four defenders formation, and handed international debuts to Andrew Nabbout, Dimitri Petratos, and Aleksandar Susnjar. Despite going ahead in the 20th minute after a goal by Jackson Irvine, Australia lost the match 4–1. A few days later, Australia drew 0–0 in a friendly match against Colombia at Craven Cottage in London, with Danny Vukovic saving an 86th minute penalty.

More than 2 months later, on 1 June 2018, Australia played the first of two friendlies in preparation for the World Cup. They beat Czech Republic 4–0 at NV Arena in Sankt Pölten, Austria, with Mathew Leckie scoring a brace and Nabbout scoring his first international goal. Six minutes before the end of the game, teenager Daniel Arzani was subbed on, making his international debut. In the second friendly on 9 June 2018, Australia defeated Hungary 2–1 in Budapest, with Arzani scoring his first goal for the national team before both teams scored own goals late in the game.

Australia entered the World Cup ranked 36 in the official FIFA World Rankings. In their first match, Australia lost 2–1 to France with Mile Jedinak scoring the goal for Australia from a penalty kick given after Samuel Umtiti handled the ball in the box. France scored with a penalty by Antoine Griezmann after Uruguayan referee Andrés Cunha consulted VAR and with a deflected shot by Paul Pogba which was confirmed by goal line technology. Arzani was subbed on in the 84th minute and at the age of 19 years and 163 days became the youngest player to ever make a World Cup appearance for Australia. In their second match, Australia drew 1–1 with Denmark with Jedinak scoring the goal for Australia from a penalty kick given after Yussuf Poulsen handled the ball in the box which was confirmed by VAR. Denmark had opened the scoring from a goal by Christian Eriksen. In their third and final match, Australia lost to Peru 2–0, with André Carrillo and Paolo Guerrero scoring from open play.

During their first match under new coach Arnold, and also their first match following the World Cup, Australia beat Kuwait 4–0, leading via an own goal from Khalid El Ebrahim, with Apostolos Giannou and Tom Rogic scoring the second and third goals. Awer Mabil sealed the scoreline, scoring his first senior international goal. The game was also marked by Mabil and Thomas Deng making their senior debuts for Australia, with both South Sudanese refugees growing up together and playing together during their boyhood. Their debuts lead to tributes on social media, led by Patrice Evra.

In the beginning of November, upcoming star Arzani was injured while playing for his club Celtic during a domestic match, rupturing his ACL, most likely ruling him out for the season.

In mid-November Australia played two friendly matches in Australia in preparation for the 2019 AFC Asian Cup, against South Korea and against Lebanon. The match against South Korea ended in a 1–1 draw, with Massimo Luongo equalising in the 94th minute, cancelling-out Hwang Ui-jo's opening goal. The match against Lebanon was a send-off match for Tim Cahill, who played 9 minutes and marked his 108th and final appearance for Australia. Australia won the match 3–0 with Martin Boyle, on his starting debut, scoring twice and assisting Leckie for the third goal. Australia finished the year, beating Oman 5–0 as a final warm-up for the AFC Asian Cup. Chris Ikonomidis and Milos Degenek scored their first international goals, while Nabbout, Mabil, and Irvine also scored.

Australia finished the year ranked 41 on the official FIFA rankings released on 20 December, 5 places lower than in the January rankings.

== Record ==
As of 30 December 2018

Type	GP	W	D	L	GF	GA
Friendly	8	5	2	1	20	6
World Cup	3	0	1	2	2	5
Total	11	5	3	3	22	11

== Match results ==
=== Friendlies ===
23 March 2018	Norway	4–1	Australia	Oslo, Norway
18:00 CET (UTC+1)	Kamara 36', 57', 90+1'; Reginiussen 48'	Report	Irvine 19'	Stadium: Ullevaal Stadion; Referee: Andreas Ekberg (Sweden)

27 March 2018	Colombia	0–0	Australia	London, England
20:00 BST (UTC+1)		Report		Stadium: Craven Cottage; Referee: Robert Madley (England)

1 June 2018	Australia	4–0	Czech Republic	St. Pölten, Austria
13:00 CEST (UTC+2)	Leckie 32', 72'; Nabbout 54'; Jugas 80' (o.g.)	Report		Stadium: NV Arena; Referee: Alexander Harkam (Austria)

9 June 2018	Hungary	1–2	Australia	Budapest, Hungary
17:30 CEST (UTC+2)	Sainsbury 88' (o.g.)	Report	Arzani 74'; Kádár 90+2' (o.g.)	Stadium: Groupama Arena; Referee: Matej Jug (Slovenia)

15 October 2018	Kuwait	0–4	Australia	Kuwait City, Kuwait
19:30 AST (UTC+3)		Report	El Ebrahim 12' (o.g.); Giannou 21'; Rogic 82'; Mabil 88'	Stadium: Al Kuwait Sports Club Stadium; Referee: Yaqoob Said Abdullah Abdul Baki (Oman)

17 November 2018	Australia	1–1	South Korea	Brisbane, Australia
18:50 AEST (UTC+10)	Luongo 90+4'	Report	U.J. Hwang 22'	Stadium: Suncorp Stadium; Attendance: 32,922; Referee: Jumpei Iida (Japan)

20 November 2018	Australia	3–0	Lebanon	Sydney, Australia
19:30 AEDT (UTC+11)	Boyle 19', 41'; Leckie 68'	Report		Stadium: ANZ Stadium; Attendance: 33,268; Referee: Ryuji Sato (Japan)

30 December 2018	Australia	5–0	Oman	Dubai, United Arab Emirates
16:00 GST (UTC+4)	Nabbout 10'; Ikonomidis 14'; Mabil 24'; Degenek 58'; Irvine 89'	Report		Stadium: Maktoum bin Rashid Al Maktoum Stadium; Attendance: 0 (behind closed doors)

=== World Cup ===
16 June 2018 Group Stage	France	2–1	Australia	Kazan, Russia
13:00 MSK (UTC+3)	Griezmann 58' (pen.); Behich 81' (o.g.)	Report (FFA); Report (FIFA)	Jedinak 62' (pen.)	Stadium: Kazan Arena; Attendance: 41,279; Referee: Andrés Cunha (Uruguay)

21 June 2018 Group Stage	Denmark	1–1	Australia	Samara, Russia
16:00 SAMT (UTC+4)	Eriksen 7'	Report (FFA); Report (FIFA)	Jedinak 38' (pen.)	Stadium: Cosmos Arena; Attendance: 40,727; Referee: Antonio Mateu Lahoz (Spain)

26 June 2018 Group Stage	Australia	0–2	Peru	Sochi, Russia
17:00 MSK (UTC+3)		Report (FFA); Report (FIFA)	Carrillo 18'; Guerrero 50'	Stadium: Fisht Olympic Stadium; Attendance: 44,073; Referee: Sergei Karasev (Russia)

== Player statistics ==
Correct as of 30 December 2018 (v. Oman).
Numbers are listed by player's number in World Cup or last friendly played

No.	Pos	Nat	Player	Total		Friendlies		World Cup	
No.	Pos	Nat	Player	Apps	Goals	Apps	Goals	Apps	Goals
1	GK	(Australia) AUS	Mathew Ryan	9	0	6+0	0	3+0	0
12	GK	(Australia) AUS	Brad Jones	2	0	1+1	0	0+0	0
18	GK	(Australia) AUS	Danny Vukovic	3	0	1+2	0	0+0	0
2	DF	(Australia) AUS	Milos Degenek	5	1	4+1	1	0+0	0
3	DF	(Australia) AUS	Alex Gersbach	2	0	0+2	0	0+0	0
4	DF	(Australia) AUS	Rhyan Grant	2	0	2+0	0	0+0	0
6	DF	(Australia) AUS	Matthew Jurman	2	0	0+2	0	0+0	0
8	DF	(Australia) AUS	Bailey Wright	1	0	1+0	0	0+0	0
16	DF	(Australia) AUS	Aziz Behich	11	0	8+0	0	3+0	0
19	DF	(Australia) AUS	Josh Risdon	8	0	5+0	0	3+0	0
20	DF	(Australia) AUS	Trent Sainsbury	9	0	6+0	0	3+0	0
21	DF	(Australia) AUS	Thomas Deng	1	0	0+1	0	0+0	0
26	DF	(Australia) AUS	Aleksandar Susnjar	1	0	0+1	0	0+0	0
5	MF	(Australia) AUS	Mark Milligan	10	0	7+0	0	3+0	0
8	MF	(Australia) AUS	Massimo Luongo	7	1	5+2	1	0+0	0
13	MF	(Australia) AUS	Aaron Mooy	8	0	5+0	0	3+0	0
13	MF	(Australia) AUS	James Jeggo	1	0	0+1	0	0+0	0
14	MF	(Australia) AUS	James Troisi	1	0	0+1	0	0+0	0
15	MF	(Australia) AUS	Mile Jedinak	6	2	2+1	0	3+0	2
17	MF	(Australia) AUS	Daniel Arzani	6	1	0+3	1	0+3	0
17	MF	(Australia) AUS	Mustafa Amini	3	0	2+1	0	0+0	0
21	MF	(Australia) AUS	Dimitri Petratos	2	0	1+1	0	0+0	0
22	MF	(Australia) AUS	Jackson Irvine	10	2	3+4	2	0+3	0
23	MF	(Australia) AUS	Tom Rogic	9	1	5+1	1	3+0	0
4	FW	(Australia) AUS	Tim Cahill	4	0	0+3	0	0+1	0
7	FW	(Australia) AUS	Mathew Leckie	10	3	6+1	3	3+0	0
9	FW	(Australia) AUS	Tomi Juric	9	0	2+4	0	1+2	0
10	FW	(Australia) AUS	Robbie Kruse	10	0	5+2	0	3+0	0
11	FW	(Australia) AUS	Andrew Nabbout	8	2	5+1	2	2+0	0
14	FW	(Australia) AUS	Jamie Maclaren	3	0	1+2	0	0+0	0
14	FW	(Australia) AUS	Martin Boyle	3	2	1+2	2	0+0	0
15	FW	(Australia) AUS	Chris Ikonomidis	1	1	1+0	1	0+0	0
17	FW	(Australia) AUS	Nikita Rukavytsya	2	0	0+2	0	0+0	0
21	FW	(Australia) AUS	Awer Mabil	4	2	2+2	2	0+0	0
24	FW	(Australia) AUS	Apostolos Giannou	1	1	1+0	1	0+0	0
