= List of Melbourne City FC internationals =

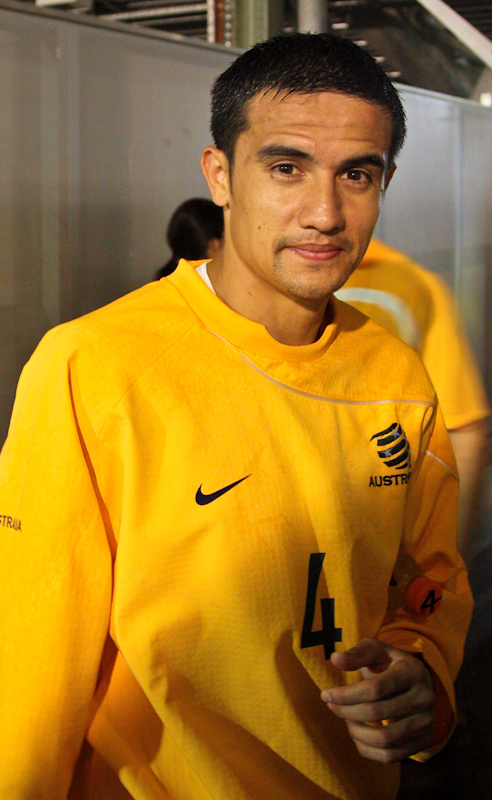
Forward Tim Cahill made 13 appearances for Australia, scoring three times between 2016 and 2017.

Melbourne City Football Club is an association football club based in Melbourne, Victoria, Australia. Founded on 12 June 2009 as Melbourne Heart Football Club, it changed names in August 2015 after being bought out by City Football Group. From its creation, the club has competed in the A-League, the first tier of soccer in Australia.

Melbourne City has always played home games at AAMI Park in Melbourne. The club colours and crest were altered from the original red and white colour scheme to "city blue" after the change of control in 2015. City has a longstanding rivalry with Melbourne Victory, with whom it contests the Melbourne Derby.

The following list contains all footballers who have represented their country at full international level whilst being a Melbourne City player.

== Introduction ==
Melbourne City's first international was defender Dean Heffernan who appeared for Australia on 6 January 2010, in a 2–2 draw against Kuwait national football team in the 2011 AFC Asian Cup qualification group stage match. Australian internationals Tim Cahill and Aaron Mooy are Melbourne City's most-capped players, each appearing in 13 games for the nation while contracted to Melbourne City. Jamie Maclaren is the club's top international goalscorer, netting four times for Australia during his tenure with Melbourne City to date.

The majority of Melbourne City players that have received international caps are for Australia.

Melbourne City have had a number of players who have represented their country in major international tournaments whilst at the club.

=== FIFA World Cup ===
The first fully-fledged Melbourne City player to be selected for a FIFA World Cup was Daniel Arzani, who represented Australia in 2018.

Previously, a number of Melbourne City players had played at the World Cup immediately prior to joining the club. Michael Beauchamp had signed for the club prior to the 2010 FIFA World Cup, and made one appearance for Australia at the tournament before joining Melbourne. Similarly, David Villa was announced as joining Melbourne on loan from New York City before representing Spain at the 2014 tournament.

=== Continental tournaments ===
Aaron Hughes was confirmed to be leaving Melbourne City in April 2016, and went on to represent Northern Ireland immediately afterwards at Euro 2016.

== List of players ==
Key

- Players are initially arranged by alphabetical order of surname.
- Appearances as a substitute are included.
- International years indicates the year of the player's first and last caps while a Melbourne City player. Caps included are for the number won by the player during his time with Melbourne City and may not be the full total of the player's career.
- Statistics are correct as of 8 February 2024.

Symbol	Meaning
‡	Player still at the club

Positions key (Note: For more information, see formation)
GK	Goalkeeper
DF	Defender
MF	Midfielder
FW	Forward

List of players making full international appearances while playing for Melbourne City FC
Name	Nation	Position	Melbourne City years	International years	Caps (Note: Only caps and goals while playing for Melbourne City are included.)	Goals	Notes
Daniel Arzani	Australia	MF	2016–2018	2018	5	1	(Note: Represented his country at the 2018 FIFA World Cup)
Michael Beauchamp	Australia	DF	2010–2011	2010	3	0	
Aziz Behich	Australia	DF	2010–2013, 2013–2014	2012	14	2	
Valon Berisha	Kosovo	MF	2022–2023	2023	2	0	
Jordan Bos	Australia	DF	2021–2023	2023	1	0	
Tim Cahill	Australia	FW	2016–2017	2016–2017	13	3	
Ivan Franjic	Australia	DF	2015–2017	2015	1	0	
Richard Garcia	Australia	MF	2012–2013	2012	4	1	
Patrick Gerhardt	Liberia	DF	2012–2014	2013	1	0	
Curtis Good ‡	Australia	DF	2011–2012, 2018–	2021	1	0	
Aaron Hughes	Northern Ireland	DF	2015–2016	2016	7	0	
Mathew Leckie ‡	Australia	FW	2021–	2021–2022	14	2	(Note: Represented his country at the 2022 FIFA World Cup.)
Jamie Maclaren ‡	Australia	FW	2019–	2019–2022	19	10	
Michael Marrone	Australia	DF	2010–2013	2012	1	1	
Connor Metcalfe	Australia	MF	2017–2022	2021	2	0	
Michael Mifsud	Malta	FW	2013–2014	2013–2014	5	2	
Aaron Mooy	Australia	MF	2014–2016	2014–2016	13	2	
Andrew Nabbout ‡	Australia	MF	2020–	2021	1	0	
Aiden O'Neill	Australia	FW	2020–2023	2023	2	0	
Marco Tilio ‡	Australia	FW	2020–2023, 2024–	2022–2023	7	0	
David Villa	Spain	MF	2014	2014	2	3	(Note: Represented his country at the 2014 FIFA World Cup)
