= 2019 Australia national soccer team season =

Australia
2019 season
- Chairman: Chris Nikou
- Manager: Graham Arnold
Home colours	Away colours

This page summarises the Australia men's national soccer team fixtures and results in 2019.

== Summary ==
Australia participated as title-holders in the 2019 AFC Asian Cup held in United Arab Emirates in January. The draw took place in Dubai on 4 May 2018. Australia qualified for the tournament after topping the group in the second round of the World Cup qualification campaign. Australia was hit by injuries ahead of the Cup with upcoming teenager Daniel Arzani and starting midfielder Aaron Mooy injured before the cup, and recently-debuted Scot-born Martin Boyle being injured in the final friendly match against Oman before the cup.

Australia's Asian Cup title defence commenced against Jordan and despite a pretence of favouritism due to being defending champions, Australia lost 1–0 after a headed goal from Jordan's Anas Bani Yaseen in the 26th minute. In their second match of the group, Australia bounced back from the loss, beating Palestine 3–0, with Jamie Maclaren scoring his first goal for Australia and Awer Mabil and Apostolos Giannou scoring too. Australia advanced from the group stage after beating Syria 3–2, with Tom Rogic scoring in injury time, following goals by Mabil and Chris Ikonomidis which put Australia in the lead. After the first two Australian goals, Syria equalized with goals by Omar Kharbin and Omar Al Somah. In the round of 16 match against Uzbekistan, neither team scored after 90 minutes of regulation time and after 30 minutes of extra-time. In the penalty shootout following the game, Australia progressed with a 4–2 score, after Mathew Ryan saved 2 penalties. In the quarter-final match against hosts United Arab Emirates, Australia were knocked-out of the Asian Cup after losing 1–0 with Ali Mabkhout scoring following a defensive error by Milos Degenek.

On 7 June 2019, Australia played an inexperienced side against South Korea in a friendly match in Busan. South Korea won 1–0 with Hwang Ui-jo scoring the only goal in the 76th minute. Australia had 4 players debuting for the senior national team, with Andrew Redmayne and Brandon O'Neill starting while Brandon Borrello and Ryan Williams were substituted on.

In September 2019, Australia commenced the qualification process for the 2022 FIFA World Cup. Australia started in the second round of AFC qualification which doubles as the second round of qualifiers for the 2023 AFC Asian Cup. The draw for the second round was held on 17 July 2019 at AFC House in Kuala Lumpur, Malaysia. Australia were placed in pot 1 and were drawn against Jordan, Kuwait, Chinese Taipei and Nepal. Australia started the qualification process with a 3–0 away win over Kuwait, with stand-in skipper Mathew Leckie scoring a brace and Mooy scoring the third goal. A month later, in their first home match of the qualification process, Australia beat Nepal 5–0, with Maclaren scoring a hat-trick and Scottish-born debutant Harry Souttar scoring a brace. 5 days later, Australia travelled to Taiwan and beat Chinese Taipei 7–1, with Adam Taggart, and Jackson Irvine scoring braces while Souttar and Maclaren scored their fourth international goals in a week. Australia finished the year in Jordan, where they had not previously beaten the hosts. An early Adam Taggart goal was the only one of the match to leave Australia with a perfect record after 4 matches of World Cup qualifying and 4 to play in the first half of 2020.

== Record ==
As of match played 14 November 2019

Type	GP	W	D	L	GF	GA
Friendly	1	0	0	1	0	1
Asian Cup	5	2	1	2	6	4
World Cup & Asian Cup qualifiers	4	4	0	0	16	1
Total	10	6	1	3	22	6

== Match results ==
=== Friendlies ===
7 June 2019	South Korea	1–0	Australia	Busan, South Korea
20:00 KST (UTC+9)	U.J. Hwang 76'	Report		Stadium: Busan Asiad Main Stadium; Attendance: 52,213; Referee: Minoru Tōjō (Japan)

=== Asian Cup ===
6 January 2019 Group stage	Australia	0–1	Jordan	Al Ain, United Arab Emirates
15:00 GST (UTC+4)		Report	Bani Yaseen 26'	Stadium: Hazza bin Zayed Stadium; Attendance: 4,934; Referee: Ahmed Al-Kaf (Oman)

11 January 2019 Group stage	Palestine	0–3	Australia	Dubai, United Arab Emirates
15:00 GST (UTC+4)		Report	Maclaren 18'; Mabil 20'; Giannou 90'	Stadium: Rashid Stadium; Attendance: 11,915; Referee: Valentin Kovalenko (Uzbekistan)

15 January 2019 Group stage	Australia	3–2	Syria	Al Ain, United Arab Emirates
17:30 GST (UTC+4)	Mabil 41'; Ikonomidis 54'; Rogic 90+3'	Report	Kharbin 43'; Al Somah 80' (pen.)	Stadium: Khalifa bin Zayed Stadium; Attendance: 10,492; Referee: César Arturo Ramos (Mexico)

21 January 2019 Round of 16	Australia	0–0 (a.e.t.) (4–2 p)	Uzbekistan	Al Ain, United Arab Emirates
18:00 GST (UTC+4)		Report		Stadium: Khalifa bin Zayed Stadium; Attendance: 6,809; Referee: Abdulrahman Al-Jassim (Qatar)
	Penalties
	Milligan (penalty scored); Behich (penalty missed); Kruse (penalty scored); Giannou (penalty scored); Leckie (penalty scored)		(penalty scored) Shukurov; (penalty missed) Tukhtakhodjaev; (penalty scored) Alibaev; (penalty missed) Bikmaev

25 January 2019 Quarter-finals	United Arab Emirates	1–0	Australia	Al Ain, United Arab Emirates
20:00 GST (UTC+4)	Mabkhout 68'	Report		Stadium: Hazza bin Zayed Stadium; Attendance: 25,053; Referee: Ryuji Sato (Japan)

=== World Cup and Asian Cup qualifiers ===
10 September 2019 Group B	Kuwait	0–3	Australia	Kuwait City, Kuwait
18:30 UTC+3		Report	Leckie 7', 30'; Mooy 38'	Stadium: Al Kuwait Sports Club Stadium; Attendance: 11,852; Referee: Muhammad Taqi (Singapore)

10 October 2019 Group B	Australia	5–0	Nepal	Canberra, Australia
19:30 UTC+11	Maclaren 6', 19', 90'; Souttar 23', 59'	Report		Stadium: Canberra Stadium; Attendance: 18,563; Referee: Thoriq Munir Alkatiri (Indonesia)

15 October 2019 Group B	Chinese Taipei	1–7	Australia	Kaohsiung, Taiwan
19:10 UTC+8	Y.W. Chen 21'	Report	Taggart 12', 19'; Irvine 34', 37'; Maclaren 84'; Souttar 73', 89'	Stadium: National Stadium; Attendance: 3,217; Referee: Mongkolchai Pechsri (Thailand)

14 November 2019 Group B	Jordan	0–1	Australia	Amman, Jordan
18:00 UTC+2		Source	Taggart 13'	Stadium: King Abdullah II Stadium; Attendance: 9,712; Referee: Fu Ming (China)

== Player statistics ==
Correct as of 14 November 2019 (v. Jordan).
Numbers are listed by player's number in Asian Cup or last match played

No.	Pos	Nat	Player	Total		Friendlies		Asian Cup		World Cup qualifiers	
No.	Pos	Nat	Player	Apps	Goals	Apps	Goals	Apps	Goals	Apps	Goals
1	GK	(Australia) AUS	Mathew Ryan	9	0	0+0	0	5+0	0	4+0	0
18	GK	(Australia) AUS	Andrew Redmayne	1	0	1+0	0	0+0	0	0+0	0
2	DF	(Australia) AUS	Milos Degenek	8	0	0+0	0	5+0	0	3+0	0
2	DF	(Australia) AUS	Matthew Spiranovic	1	0	0+1	0	0+0	0	0+0	0
3	DF	(Australia) AUS	Brad Smith	3	0	0+1	0	0+0	0	2+0	0
4	DF	(Australia) AUS	Rhyan Grant	10	0	1+0	0	4+1	0	4+0	0
6	DF	(Australia) AUS	Matthew Jurman	2	0	1+0	0	0+1	0	0+0	0
8	DF	(Australia) AUS	Bailey Wright	2	0	1+0	0	0+0	0	1+0	0
16	DF	(Australia) AUS	Aziz Behich	8	0	1+0	0	5+0	0	2+0	0
19	DF	(Australia) AUS	Josh Risdon	1	0	0+0	0	1+0	0	0+0	0
20	DF	(Australia) AUS	Trent Sainsbury	6	0	0+0	0	4+0	0	2+0	0
23	DF	(Australia) AUS	Harry Souttar	2	4	0+0	0	0+0	0	2+0	4
5	MF	(Australia) AUS	Mark Milligan	6	0	0+0	0	5+0	0	1+0	0
6	MF	(Australia) AUS	James Jeggo	4	0	1+0	0	0+0	0	3+0	0
7	MF	(Australia) AUS	Dimitri Petratos	1	0	0+1	0	0+0	0	0+0	0
8	MF	(Australia) AUS	Massimo Luongo	4	0	0+0	0	2+2	0	0+0	0
9	MF	(Australia) AUS	Martin Boyle	1	0	0+0	0	0+0	0	0+1	0
10	MF	(Australia) AUS	Ryan Williams	1	0	0+1	0	0+0	0	0+0	0
13	MF	(Australia) AUS	Aaron Mooy	4	1	0+0	0	0+0	0	4+0	1
14	MF	(Australia) AUS	Brandon Borrello	3	0	0+1	0	0+0	0	2+0	0
17	MF	(Australia) AUS	Mustafa Amini	3	0	1+0	0	0+0	0	0+2	0
19	MF	(Australia) AUS	Ajdin Hrustic	2	0	0+0	0	0+0	0	0+2	0
22	MF	(Australia) AUS	Jackson Irvine	9	2	0+0	0	4+1	0	4+0	2
23	MF	(Australia) AUS	Tom Rogic	5	1	0+0	0	4+0	1	1+0	0
23	MF	(Australia) AUS	Brandon O'Neill	1	0	1+0	0	0+0	0	0+0	0
7	FW	(Australia) AUS	Mathew Leckie	4	2	0+0	0	0+2	0	2+0	2
9	FW	(Australia) AUS	Jamie Maclaren	7	5	0+0	0	5+0	1	1+1	4
10	FW	(Australia) AUS	Adam Taggart	4	3	0+1	0	0+0	0	3+0	3
10	FW	(Australia) AUS	Robbie Kruse	5	0	0+0	0	2+3	0	0+0	0
11	FW	(Australia) AUS	Andrew Nabbout	1	0	0+0	0	0+1	0	0+0	0
11	FW	(Australia) AUS	Craig Goodwin	2	0	1+0	0	0+0	0	1+0	0
14	FW	(Australia) AUS	Apostolos Giannou	6	1	0+0	0	1+3	1	0+2	0
15	FW	(Australia) AUS	Chris Ikonomidis	5	1	0+0	0	4+1	1	0+0	0
15	FW	(Australia) AUS	Mitchell Duke	2	0	1+0	0	0+0	0	0+1	0
21	FW	(Australia) AUS	Awer Mabil	10	2	1+0	0	4+1	2	2+2	0
