= Daniel Arzani =

Australian soccer player (born 1999)

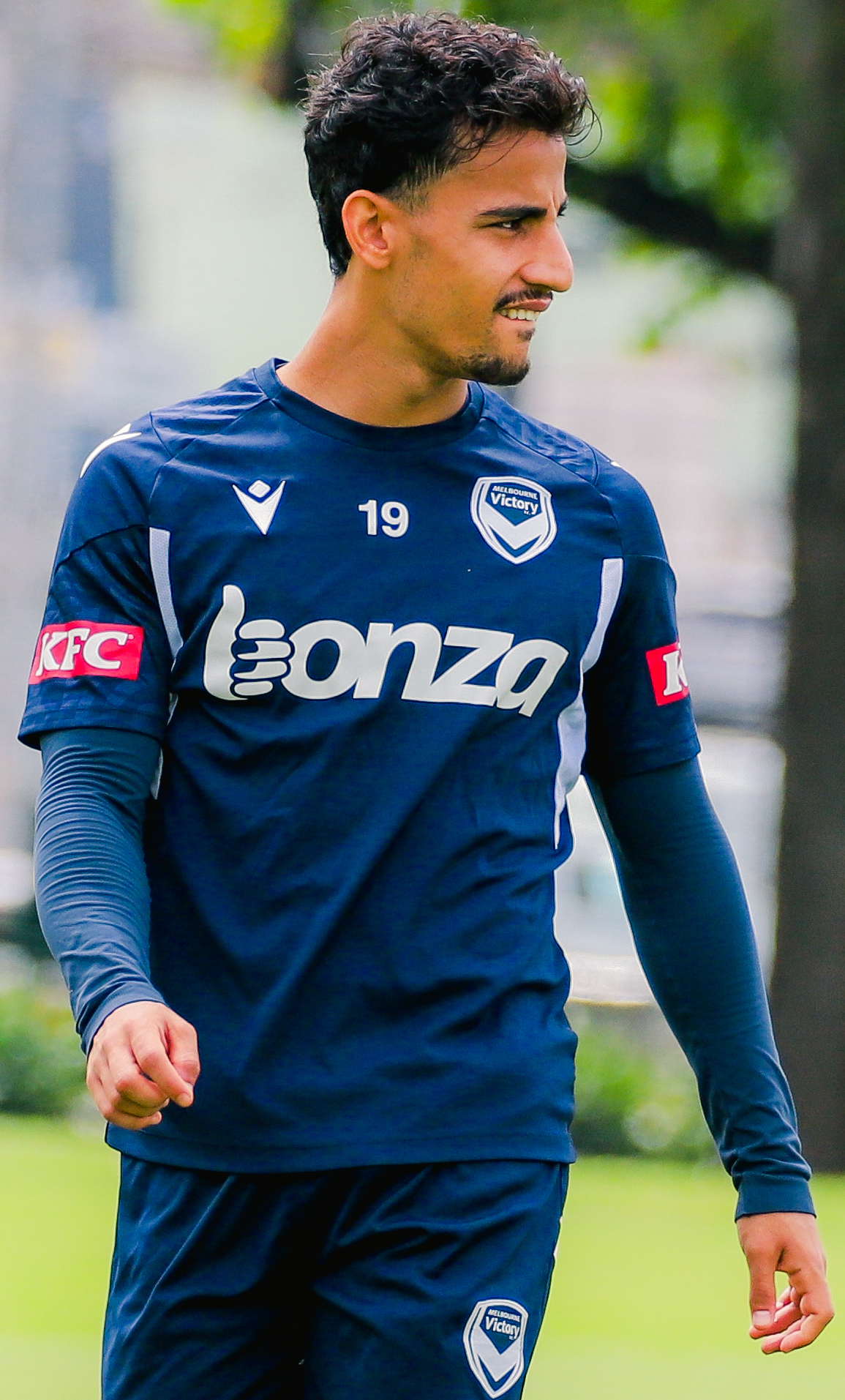
- Arzani training with Melbourne Victory in 2023

Personal information
- Full name: Daniel Arzani
- Date of birth: 4 January 1999 (age 27)
- Place of birth: Khorramabad, Lorestan, Iran
- Height: 1.75 m (5 ft 9 in)
- Positions: Winger; attacking midfielder

Team information
- Current team: Ferencváros
- Number: 15

Youth career
- 2009–2011: Coogee United
- 2011–2013: Eastern Suburbs
- 2014–2015: FFA CoE
- 2015–2016: Sydney FC

Senior career*
Years	Team	Apps	(Gls)
2016–2017	Melbourne City NPL	6	(1)
2016–2018	Melbourne City	24	(2)
2018–2022	Manchester City	0	(0)
2018–2020	→ Celtic (loan)	1	(0)
2020–2021	→ Utrecht (loan)	4	(0)
2020–2021	→ Jong Utrecht (loan)	6	(1)
2021	→ AGF (loan)	4	(0)
2021–2022	→ Lommel (loan)	13	(1)
2022–2023	Macarthur FC	19	(1)
2023–2025	Melbourne Victory	60	(7)
2025–	Ferencváros	11	(0)
2025–2026	→ Melbourne City (loan)	8	(1)

International career^{‡}
2014–2015	Australia U17	7	(1)
2017	Australia U20	1	(0)
2017–2021	Australia U23	9	(3)
2018–	Australia	11	(1)
- * Club domestic league appearances and goals as of 1 May 2026 ‡ National team caps and goals as of 10 October 2025

Daniel Arzani (Persian: دنیل ارزانی; born 4 January 1999) is a professional soccer player who plays as a winger or attacking midfielder for Nemzeti Bajnokság I club Ferencváros. Born in Iran, he represents the Australia national team.

== Club career ==
=== Sydney FC ===
Daniel Arzani played for the youth team of Sydney FC in 2016.

=== Melbourne City ===
==== 2016–17 season ====
Arzani started playing for Melbourne City in 2016. On 28 January 2017, Arzani scored a goal for Melbourne City Youth in the Grand Final to win the 2016–17 A-League National Youth League.

==== 2017–18 season ====
On 6 January 2018, during their 2017–18 season, Arzani was brought on as a substitute with the senior side and provided two assists in a 2–1 comeback win against Wellington Phoenix. He provided two more assists in his first senior start on 9 January against Perth Glory. Arzani scored his first A-League goal on 25 January 2018 against the Newcastle Jets. After just four starts from his club's 18 league games, Arzani led his team for the most successful dribbles with 31. He won the A-League player of the month award for his performances in January. By April 2018, Arzani led the league in successful dribbles with 89, provided the most assists out of all under-23 players in the league, and was nominated for the A-League Young Footballer of the Year award. At the conclusion of the season, it was announced that he won the award. He was subsequently named in the A-League Team of the Season. In July 2018, Arzani won the Harry Kewell Medal for the best Australian male under-23 player.

=== Manchester City ===
On 9 August 2018, Arzani moved from Melbourne City to fellow City Football Group club Manchester City, with his new club indicating they intended to loan him to another side.

==== Loan to Celtic ====
On 17 August 2018, Arzani was loaned to Scottish champions Celtic on a two-year loan deal. Arzani scored a free kick for the Celtic Academy on 17 September 2018 against Aberdeen. He was given his first team debut by manager Brendan Rodgers on 31 October 2018 in a Scottish Premiership match against Dundee. He suffered a torn ACL on debut, ruling him out for the 2019 AFC Asian Cup and the rest of the Celtic season, as well as the 2020 AFC U-23 Championship. Arzani made his return from injury on 17 September 2019 in a Celtic reserves match against Hibernian. He made his return to the Celtic first team on 18 January 2020 under manager Neil Lennon in a Scottish Cup match against Partick Thistle. Arzani scored his final goal for Celtic in a reserves match against English Championship side Middlesbrough on 11 February 2020.

==== Loan to Utrecht ====
On 7 August 2020, Arzani joined Dutch Eredivisie side Utrecht on loan ahead of their 2020–21 season. He made his club debut in a friendly match against Go Ahead Eagles the following day on 8 August 2020. He provided his first assist for the club in his following friendly match against Ajax at the Johan Cruyff Arena on 13 August 2020 and made his Eredivisie debut in their opening match at VVV-Venlo on 18 September 2020. He had his first assist in the Eredivisie from a corner on 27 September 2020 during his next match against RKC Waalwijk. Arzani subsequently made his Jong Utrecht debut on 19 October 2020 against Jong Ajax, before making his Dutch Cup debut for the senior team against FC Dordrecht on 27 October 2020 with an assist to Sander van de Streek. Arzani scored his first goal for Jong Utrecht on 4 December 2020 in a league match against Almere City.

==== Loan to Aarhus ====
On 26 January 2021, Arzani joined AGF in the Danish Superliga on loan during the 2020–21 season. He scored a goal on his club debut in a friendly match against Horsens on 3 February 2021 and made his league debut against Lyngby on 7 February 2021. He made his Danish Cup debut in the following match on 10 February against B.93 Copenhagen. Arzani made two appearances for the reserve side within his first month, scoring in both matches. He made his final appearance of the season on 28 May 2021 in a European play-off match against AaB, helping his team reach the qualification rounds of the inaugural UEFA Europa Conference League.

==== Loan to Lommel ====
On 19 August 2021, Arzani joined City Football Group-owned Lommel in the Belgian second division on loan, scoring a goal on his club debut during a trial on 8 August in a friendly match against Eredivisie side RKC Waalwijk. He made his competitive debut for the club on 21 August in a league match against Mouscron during the 2021–22 season. Arzani scored his first league goal for the club on 11 December 2021 against Mouscron at the Stade Le Canonnier.

=== Macarthur FC ===
On 26 July 2022, Arzani joined Macarthur FC ahead of the 2022–23 A-League Men season. He made his club debut on 30 July 2022, scoring a goal and providing two assists in an Australia Cup match against Magpies Crusaders. Arzani contributed to three goals in the semi-final on 14 September 2022 against Oakleigh Cannons, scoring two goals and winning a penalty that was scored by Ulises Dávila, helping his team reach their first-ever final. On 1 October 2022, Arzani helped lead Macarthur FC to their first-ever trophy in club history by winning the 2022 Australia Cup Final. Arzani scored his first league goal for the club and provided an assist in their home opener on 16 October 2022 against Adelaide United at Campbelltown Stadium, with his goal celebration being in support of the Mahsa Amini protests. By November 2022, Arzani led the league in successful dribbles for the season after five league matches. With five goals and eight assists in all competitions during the season, Arzani was granted an early release from his contract by Macarthur FC on 7 July 2023 after one season with the club.

=== Melbourne Victory ===
==== 2023–24 season ====
On 9 July 2023, it was announced that Arzani had signed a two-year deal with Melbourne Victory ahead of their 2023–24 season. Arzani scored his first goal for Victory and provided two assists on 30 August 2023 in a pre-season friendly match against Dandenong City, before scoring again in a friendly match against North Geelong Warriors on 20 September 2023. He made his league debut for the club during their season opener on 21 October 2023 against Sydney FC at the Allianz Stadium in Sydney. Arzani provided his first league assist for the club in the following match during their home opener on 29 October 2023 against the Newcastle Jets at AAMI Park. He scored his first league goal for the club on 16 December 2023 against Sydney FC. Arzani scored his following goal on 13 January 2024 against the Central Coast Mariners, and provided two stoppage time assists within the span of three minutes on 20 February 2024 in a 2–1 comeback win against Western United. On 27 April 2024, Arzani scored his first brace for the club with two goals against the Western Sydney Wanderers. Arzani finished his first regular season at Melbourne Victory with four goals and seven assists across 27 league appearances, leading his team in assists for the season, leading the league with 27 take-ons in the opposition box, and helping to lead Victory to the Grand Final.

==== 2024–25 season ====
Since day one, when I met him, I told him and I'll say again, I think he's the most gifted Australian player I have seen in the league. He's showing that and every opponent, they are fearing him. It's good for us. It's a player we always give the ball to breathe a little bit, gives us a lot of things.

— Melbourne Victory captain Roderick Miranda on Arzani, 15 May 2025.

The following 2024–25 season, Arzani played a key role in leading Victory to the Australia Cup final, featuring in all four matches leading up to the final and contributing two assists in the quarter-final match against Moreton City Excelsior. However, despite the key role he played in leading Melbourne Victory to the Australia Cup final, Arzani was controversially left out of the squad for the final; Melbourne Victory manager Patrick Kisnorbo stated he omitted Arzani from both the starting lineup and the substitute bench due to experimentation with the squad as a result of Arzani's eventual suspension from the first match of the regular season for yellow card accumulation. After the loss in the final, Kisnorbo stated he stood by his decision. However, it was also reported a day after the match that the main reason Arzani was excluded from the matchday squad for the final was rumored to be for the anger he expressed towards Kisnorbo at training during the week, with speculation variously suggesting this was due to him discovering he wouldn't be in the starting team, while also being reported it was due to him being offered to other clubs during the offseason.

Arzani made his league debut for the season during the Melbourne Derby on 26 October 2024. He scored his first league goal of the season in the following match during their home opener on 3 November 2024, winning a penalty from his corner kick just four minutes after being substituted on, and helping secure a 2–1 comeback victory against Macarthur with a goal and a secondary assist. He registered his first assist of the league season and was named Player of the Match on 1 December 2024 against Western United. By matchweek 7, Arzani had recorded the highest number of both attempted and completed dribbles in the league for the season. Following his Player of the Match performance on 4 January 2025 against the Western Sydney Wanderers, he recorded his first assist of the 2025 calendar year and second of the league season in the next match on 10 January against Western United, before providing another assist in the following match on 18 January against Adelaide United. By January 2025, Arzani continued leading the league in successful dribbles and was second in expected assists per 90 minutes for the season.

By his 14 March 2025 national team call-up, Arzani had several strong performances with Melbourne Victory, tallying a goal and three assists for the league season while having created 32 chances for his Victory teammates. The day following his March national team call-up, he provided an assist on 15 March 2025 against Western Sydney Wanderers to bring his tally to four assists for the league season heading into the international break, for which he won the league's Assist of the Month award for his effort. In his first game upon returning from the March international break, Arzani scored twice and won a penalty on 29 March 2025 in a 5–3 win against Adelaide United, bringing his tally to three goals and four assists for the league season, and three goals and six assists in all competitions for the season. In the following match, Arzani provided an assist within four minutes of the match against Wellington Phoenix at Sky Stadium to make it two goals and two assists in three consecutive matches.

Arzani and Melbourne Victory qualified for the finals series on 25 April 2025 with a 2–1 win at Macarthur, during which Arzani completed the most dribbles, created the most chances, won the most duels, and was involved in the build-up of the winning goal. Arzani finished the 2024–25 regular season with 65 successful dribbles, the most of any player and 14 more than the next best, having also led the league in this statistic during the 2023–24 regular season with 92, and was statistically the league's top passer during the 2024–25 regular season, owing to his efficient passing into the final third and high involvement in Melbourne Victory's attacking play. In the elimination final on 10 May 2025, Arzani was named Player of the Match after creating both goals in Melbourne Victory's 2–1 win over Western Sydney Wanderers at CommBank Stadium, securing a place in the semi-finals. On 24 May 2025, in the second leg of the semi-final against Auckland FC at Mount Smart Stadium in Auckland, Arzani provided a secondary assist for the winning goal, helping Victory reach their second consecutive Grand Final. He concluded the season with three goals and six assists in all league matches, three goals and eight assists across all competitions, led the league in passes, successful dribbles, and opposition box and opposition half take-ons, leading all forwards in total carries, carry distance, and defensive metrics such as tackles attempted and tackles won, and was ranked the top-rated Australian attacking midfielder for the season.

=== Ferencváros ===
After attracting interest from clubs across Europe, Asia, and Australia, and receiving an offer from Scottish Premiership side Hearts, Arzani completed a move to defending Hungarian top division champions Ferencváros on 13 June 2025, managed by Robbie Keane, ahead of their 2025–26 season. Arzani made his club debut as a 60th-minute substitute in a pre-season friendly on 9 July 2025 against Czech top division side Zlín in Lienz, Austria. After being omitted from the matchday squads by manager Robbie Keane for the UEFA Champions League second and third qualifying rounds and the opening domestic league fixture, and remaining an unused substitute in the second league match, he eventually made his next appearance as well as his competitive debut on 9 August 2025, coming on as an 84th-minute substitute in the third matchday of a league match against Nyíregyháza at the Városi Stadion. On 15 August 2025, he was named in the Ferencváros squad for the UEFA Champions League play-off round against Qarabağ, and on 16 August, he made his home debut in the following league match during matchday four of the domestic league, coming on as a 78th-minute substitute against Puskás Akadémia at the Groupama Aréna. He remained an unused substitute in both UEFA Champions League play-off matches against Qarabağ, as Ferencváros lost 5–4 on aggregate and were transferred to the UEFA Europa League league phase. On 2 September 2025, he was not named in Robbie Keane's Ferencváros squad for the UEFA Europa League league phase, having only been given two substitute appearances in the domestic league. In his ensuing appearance on 13 September 2025, Arzani scored a hat-trick and provided an assist on his Hungarian Cup debut in a knockout fixture against Szarvaskend. In October 2025, it was reported that changes to Hungarian league regulations, introduced after Arzani's signing, limited the number of foreign players that clubs could field and subsequently reduced his playing time.

==== Loan to Melbourne City ====
On 21 January 2026, Arzani returned to Melbourne City on loan until the conclusion of the 2025–26 season. He made his season debut for the club on 7 February in a league match against Western Sydney Wanderers. Arzani made his AFC Champions League Elite debut on 11 February 2026 in a 2–1 league stage match win against Ulsan HD at the Ulsan Munsu Football Stadium, helping Melbourne City advance to the knockout stages of the Asian Champions League for the first time in club history. He provided his first assist since returning to the club in a 1–0 win at Sydney FC on 17 March, and scored his first goal of the campaign in the following match at Perth Glory on 22 March.

==== Return to Ferencváros ====
After his loan spell at Melbourne City, Arzani returned to Ferencváros ahead of their 2026–27 season, providing an assist in their first pre-season match and being named to their pre-season camp in Austria. He was subsequently named in their UEFA Europa League qualifying squads. Arzani made his UEFA competition debut on 5 August 2026 in a UEFA Europa League qualifier against Polish Ekstraklasa side Górnik Zabrze. He made his first start since the start of the league season in their following match on 8 August in a friendly against La Liga side Real Madrid. In his following appearance, he was subbed on in a UEFA Europa League play-off round win over Trabzonspor on 27 August, helping to lead his team to the league phase of the UEFA Europa League. He made his domestic league debut for the season in the following match on 30 August, starting the match and providing an assist in a 2–1 win away to league leaders Puskás Akadémia at the Pancho Aréna. Arzani was subsequently named in their squad for the league phase of the UEFA Europa League on 3 September. The same day, he provided another opening assist in the following match away to defending champions Győri ETO at ETO Park, bringing his tally to two assists in two consecutive matches. Arzani made his debut in the UEFA Europa League proper on 17 September, scoring a goal that was named UEFA Europa League Goal of the Day against his former Scottish Premiership club Celtic at Celtic Park in their opening league phase match.

== International career ==
=== Youth ===
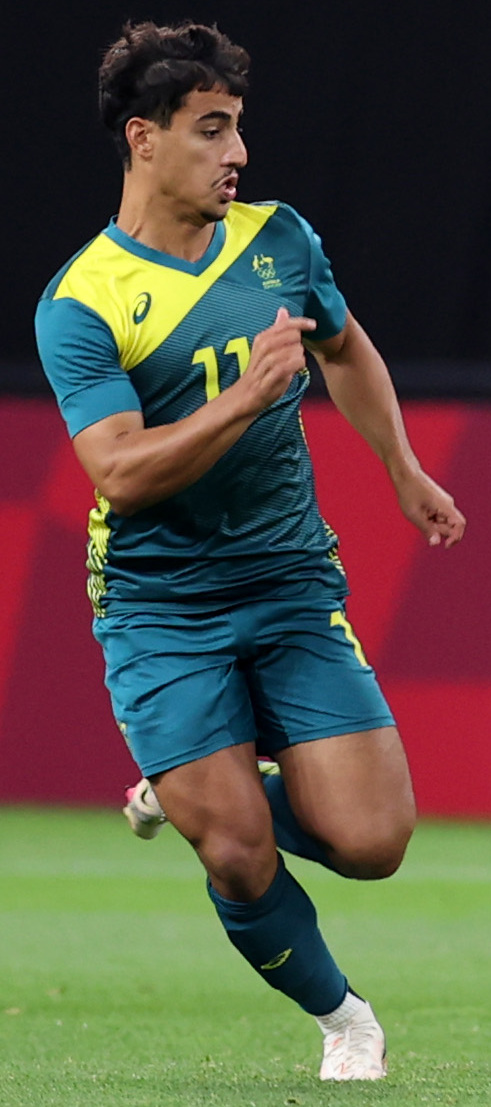
Arzani playing for Australia U-23 at the 2020 Summer Olympics.

Arzani has played for Australia at the under-17, under-20 and under-23 levels, and was called into Australia's 2014 AFC U-16 Championship and 2015 FIFA U-17 World Cup squads. Due to his Iranian heritage, Arzani was eligible to represent both Iran and Australia at international level. In February 2018, Arzani stated that he was leaning more towards representing Australia over Iran.

After featuring for the senior national team in 2018, Arzani returned to the under-23 team in October 2019 for Australia's Olympic qualifying preparations ahead of the 2020 AFC U-23 Championship. Manager Graham Arnold stated Arzani would be missing the tournament due to his ongoing recovery process before noting that he could be added to their Olympic squad should Australia qualify.

Arzani scored his first goal for the under-23 team on 12 June 2021, scoring a brace in a friendly match against Mexico during Olympic preparations in Marbella. On 28 June 2021, Arzani was named in the Olyroos Olympic squad. He made his Olympic debut on 22 July 2021, starting the match and playing 79 minutes in a 2–0 win over Argentina at the Sapporo Dome. Arzani played in all three group stage matches against Argentina, Spain, and Egypt.

=== Senior ===
At the age of 19, Arzani was called into Australia's preliminary squad for the 2018 FIFA World Cup on 7 May 2018. He made his international debut for Australia as an 84th-minute substitute for Mathew Leckie in a friendly match against the Czech Republic on 1 June 2018. He was named in Bert van Marwijk's final 23-man squad for the 2018 World Cup the following day, becoming the youngest ever Australian player in a World Cup squad as well as the youngest player overall at the 2018 World Cup. Arzani scored his first international goal for Australia one minute after being substituted on in the next friendly match for a 2–1 win against Hungary on 9 June 2018. He made his World Cup debut on 16 June 2018 as an 84th-minute substitute against France. At the age of 19 years and 163 days, he became the youngest player to ever make a World Cup appearance for Australia. Arzani was used as a substitute in the three World Cup matches against France, Denmark and Peru.

In August 2021, Arzani was called into the Australia squad for the start of the third round of 2022 FIFA World Cup qualifiers. In May 2024, Arzani returned to the national team for their 2026 FIFA World Cup qualifiers. In October 2024, he was named in Tony Popovic's inaugural Australia squad for World Cup qualifiers against China and Japan. In March 2025, Arzani was named in Popovic's Australia squad for the World Cup qualifying round's penultimate set of matches against Indonesia and China. He was given the number 10 jersey for the March national team camp and made his national team debut of the Popovic era on 20 March 2025 against Indonesia. Arzani was subsequently named in the following squad for the round's final set of World Cup qualifying matches in June 2025. On 5 June 2025, Arzani came off the bench in the 80th minute of a crucial World Cup qualifier against Japan and helped initiate the move that led to the decisive goal by winning and requesting a quickly-taken throw-in, contributing to a 1–0 victory that was Australia's first win over Japan in 16 years and put them within reach of 2026 FIFA World Cup qualification heading into the final match of the round. In the following and final match of the AFC third round qualifiers on 10 June 2025, with Arzani in camp for the June window, Australia secured qualification for the 2026 FIFA World Cup and achieved their first direct qualification in 12 years.

Following Australia's qualification for the 2026 FIFA World Cup, Arzani continued his involvement with the national team and was named in the Australia squad for the October 2025 World Cup preparation friendly matches against Canada at Saputo Stadium in Montreal, and the United States at Dick's Sporting Goods Park in the Denver metropolitan area.

== Style of play ==
Arzani has been praised for his quick speed and skillful dribbling, capable of playing across either wing or in behind the striker. He played street football and futsal from a young age. Statistically, Arzani has excelled in key attacking and defensive metrics, leading the A-League in successful dribbles in the 2017–18, 2023–24, and 2024–25 regular seasons, topping the league in passes, opposition box take-ons, and opposition half take-ons in 2024–25, while leading all forwards in total carries, carry distance, and defensive metrics such as tackles attempted and tackles won.

== Outside football ==
=== Personal life ===
Born in Iran to Sima and John Arzani along with his brother Benjamin, Daniel moved to Australia with his family at the age of seven and was raised in Sydney before moving to Melbourne. He is fluent in English and Persian. His mother is a chemical engineer and his father and brother are dentists. Arzani is a former student of St Spyridon College, Sydney Boys High School, and La Trobe University. He enjoys reading fantasy books in his spare time.

=== Sponsorship ===
Arzani has a contract with American sportswear supplier Nike.

=== Philanthropy ===
Arzani has supported charitable initiatives by assisting with donations to SecondBite, an Australian food rescue organization.

== Career statistics ==
=== Club ===
As of match played 7 August 2026

Appearances and goals by club, season and competition
Club	Season	League			National cup (Note: Includes Australia Cup, Scottish Cup, KNVB Cup, Danish Cup, Belgian Cup, Magyar Kupa)		Continental		Total	
Club	Season	Division	Apps	Goals	Apps	Goals	Apps	Goals	Apps	Goals
FFA Centre of Excellence	2014	NPL Capital Football	12	1	–		–		12	1
FFA Centre of Excellence	2015	NPL Capital Football	8	1	–		–		8	1
FFA Centre of Excellence	Total		20	2	–		–		20	2
Melbourne City Reserves	2016	NPL Victoria 2	1	0	–		–		1	0
Melbourne City Reserves	2017	NPL Victoria 2	5	1	–		–		5	1
Melbourne City Reserves	Total		6	1	–		–		6	1
Melbourne City	2016–17	A-League	6	0	1	0	–		7	0
Melbourne City	2017–18	A-League	18	2	2	0	–		20	2
Melbourne City	Total		24	2	3	0	–		27	2
Celtic (loan)	2018–19	Scottish Premiership	1	0	0	0	0	0	1	0
Celtic (loan)	2019–20	Scottish Premiership	0	0	1	0	0	0	1	0
Celtic (loan)	Total		1	0	1	0	0	0	2	0
Utrecht (loan)	2020–21	Eredivisie	4	0	1	0	–		5	0
Jong Utrecht (loan)	2020–21	Eerste Divisie	6	1	0	0	–		6	1
AGF (loan)	2020–21	Danish Superliga	4	0	1	0	–		5	0
Lommel (loan)	2021–22	Belgian First Division B	13	1	2	0	–		15	1
Macarthur FC	2022–23	A-League Men	19	1	5	3	–		24	4
Melbourne Victory	2023–24	A-League Men	31	4	0	0	–		31	4
Melbourne Victory	2024–25	A-League Men	29	3	4	0	–		33	3
Melbourne Victory	Total		60	7	4	0	–		64	7
Ferencváros	2025–26	Nemzeti Bajnokság I	3	0	2	3	0	0	5	3
Ferencváros	2026–27	Nemzeti Bajnokság I	8	0	1	1	4	1	13	2
Ferencváros	Total		11	0	3	4	4	1	17	5
Melbourne City (loan)	2025–26	A-League Men	8	1	0	0	4 (Note: Appearances in AFC Champions League Elite)	0	12	1
Career total			176	16	20	7	8	1	204	24

=== International ===
As of match played 10 October 2025

Appearances and goals by national team and year
National team	Year	Apps	Goals
Australia	2018	6	1
Australia	2019	0	0
Australia	2020	0	0
Australia	2021	0	0
Australia	2022	0	0
Australia	2023	0	0
Australia	2024	1	0
Australia	2025	4	0
Total		11	1

As of 9 June 2018

Scores and results list Australia's goal tally first, score column indicates score after each Arzani goal.

List of international goals scored by Daniel Arzani
No.	Date	Venue	Cap	Opponent	Score	Result	Competition
1	9 June 2018	Groupama Arena, Budapest, Hungary	2	Hungary	1–0	2–1	Friendly

== Honours ==
Melbourne City

- National Youth League: 2016–17

Celtic

- Scottish Cup: 2019–20

Macarthur FC

- Australia Cup: 2022

Individual

- A-League Young Footballer of the Year: 2017–18
- PFA A-League Team of the Season: 2017–18
- PFA Harry Kewell Medal: 2017–18
- A-League Men Assist of the Month: March 2025
