= Gao Wei-jie =

Taiwanese association footballer

Personal information
- Date of birth: 24 June 1997 (age 29)
- Place of birth: Yunlin, Taiwan
- Height: 1.80 m (5 ft 11 in)
- Position: Midfielder

Team information
- Current team: Taiwan Power Company
- Number: 7

Senior career*
Years	Team	Apps	(Gls)
2020	National Taiwan University of Sport	14	(4)
2020–	Taiwan Power Company	38	(10)

International career^{‡}
2021–	Chinese Taipei	4	(1)
- * Club domestic league appearances and goals as of 1 July 2023 ‡ National team caps and goals as of 14 December 2022

Gao Wei-jie (Chinese: 高偉傑; pinyin: Gāo Wěijié; born on 24 June 1997) is a Taiwanese professional footballer who plays as a midfielder for Taiwan Football Premier League club Taiwan Power Company, and the Chinese Taipei national team.

He debuted internationally on 3 June 2021 in a World Cup qualifying match against Nepal in a 2–0 defeat.

On 7 June 2021, Gao scored his first goal for Chinese Taipei against Australia in a 5–1 defeat.

== Statistics ==
=== International goals ===
International goals by date, venue, opponent, score, result and competition
No.	Date	Venue	Opponent	Score	Result	Competition
1	7 June 2021	Jaber Al-Ahmad International Stadium, Kuwait City, Kuwait	Australia	1–4	1–5	2022 FIFA World Cup qualification
