= Miloš Degenek =

Soccer player (born 1994)

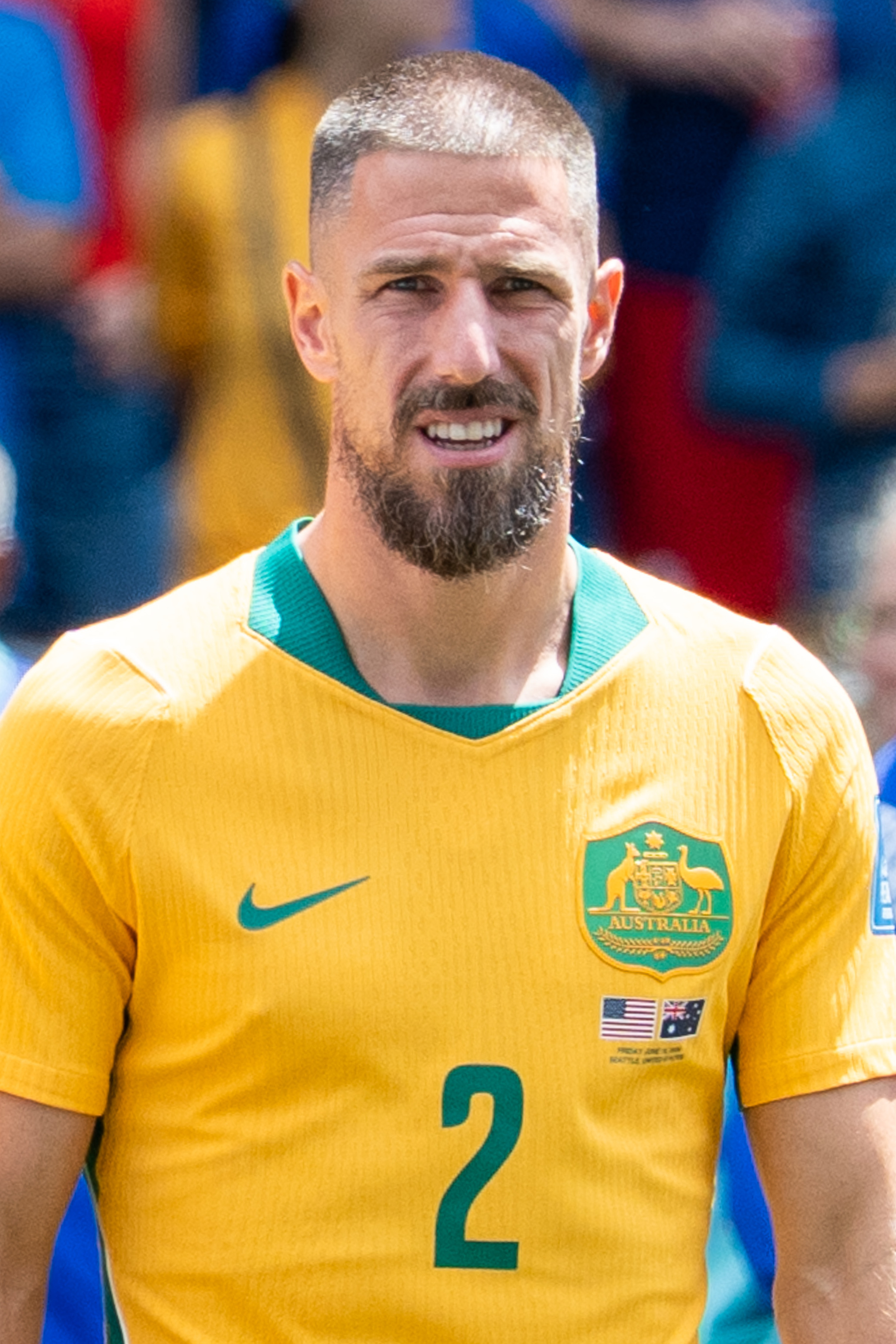
- Degenek with Australia in 2026

Personal information
- Full name: Miloš Degenek
- Date of birth: 28 April 1994 (age 32)
- Place of birth: Knin, Croatia
- Height: 1.87 m (6 ft 2 in)
- Position: Centre-back

Team information
- Current team: APOEL
- Number: 5

Youth career
- 2002–2007: Bonnyrigg White Eagles
- 2007–2009: Blacktown City
- 2009: NSWIS
- 2010–2012: AIS
- 2012–2013: VfB Stuttgart

Senior career*
Years	Team	Apps	(Gls)
2013–2015	VfB Stuttgart II	9	(0)
2015–2017	1860 Munich	33	(1)
2017–2018	Yokohama F. Marinos	37	(2)
2018	Red Star Belgrade	20	(0)
2019	Al-Hilal	11	(0)
2019–2022	Red Star Belgrade	59	(2)
2022–2023	Columbus Crew	40	(0)
2023–2024	Red Star Belgrade	7	(0)
2025–2026	TSC	29	(1)
2026–	APOEL	10	(1)

International career^{‡}
2009–2011	Australia U17	7	(1)
2012	Serbia U19	8	(0)
2015	Australia U23	4	(0)
2016–	Australia	57	(1)
- * Club domestic league appearances and goals as of 8 June 2026 ‡ National team caps and goals as of 6 June 2026

Miloš Degenek (/ˈmɪlɒʃ ˈdɛɡənɛk/ MIL-osh DEG-ə-nek; Serbian Cyrillic: Милош Дегенек, born 28 April 1994) is a professional soccer player who plays as a centre-back for Cypriot First Division club APOEL. Born in Croatia, he represents the Australia national team.

Degenek represented both Serbia and Australia at youth levels before making his senior international debut for Australia against England in 2016.

== Early life ==
Degenek was born in 1994 in Knin, Croatia, which was then the capital of the self-proclaimed Serb proto-state Republic of Serbian Krajina. He lived in Orlić, a village near Biskupija, Croatia, where his father's family is from. His family was part of the Serb population of Croatia that fled the Croatian War of Independence to Yugoslav and Serbian capital Belgrade in 1995 during Operation Storm where they lived as refugees. In 2000, at six years of age, Degenek and his family emigrated to Sydney, New South Wales, Australia, settling in the suburb of Campsie.

== Club career ==
=== Early career ===
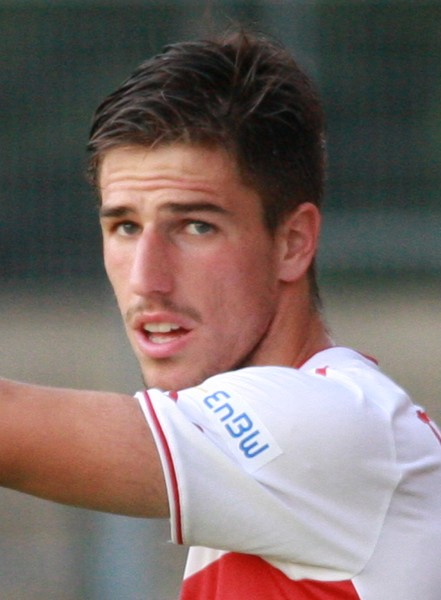
Degenek with Stuttgart in 2013

Degenek played for the Westfields Sports High School and the Australian Institute of Sport. In the summer of 2012, he joined the under-19 team of VfB Stuttgart. Upon joining the club, Degenek admitted that he "had no communication from anyone from the Young Socceroos or under 20s."

In November 2012, Degenek was called up to the first team for the first time by manager Bruno Labbadia. Although he was never called up again to the senior team, Degenek spent the rest of the 2012–13 season, playing for the U19 side.

Miloš Degenek made his first appearance for VfB Stuttgart II on 26 July 2013 in the 3. Liga against SV Darmstadt 98. However, Degenek made only 9 appearances in the 2013–14 season, due to being sidelined with injuries. He continued to be sidelined for most of the 2014–15 season, and as a result would not make a single appearance that season. At the end of the 2014–15 season, Degenek was among those expected to leave the side.

=== 1860 Munich ===
At the start of the 2015–16 season, Degenek went on trial with 2. Bundesliga club 1860 Munich, and would eventually sign a two-year contract with the club.

Degenek made his TSV 1860 Munich debut in the opening game of the season, where he started and played the whole game, in a 1–0 loss against 1. FC Heidenheim. Since making his TSV 1860 Munich debut, Degenek established himself in the starting eleven, playing in the defensive midfield. It wasn't until on 19 September 2015 when he scored his first goal for the club, in a 1–1 draw against 1. FC Kaiserslautern. He started in every match since the start of the season until he was suspended for one game over picking five yellow cards in mid–October. After that, he quickly regained his first team place later in the season despite facing competitions that saw him placed on the substitute bench. Despite being suspended on two occasions, including a second bookable offence, in a 2–1 loss against MSV Duisburg on 15 April 2016, Degenek went on to make 28 appearances and scoring once in all competitions at his first season at TSV 1860 Munich.

In the 2016–17 season, Degenek changed position when he moved into central defense at the start of the season. He started in every match since the start of the season until he suffered a medial meniscal tear along the MCL, and had to be substituted in a 2–2 draw against FC St. Pauli on 22 September 2016. After returning to the side that saw 1860 Munich win 6–2 against Erzgebirge Aue, Degenek, however, struggled to regain his first team place for the rest of the year.

=== Yokohama F. Marinos ===
On 26 January 2017, Degenek left 1860 Munich four months before the end of his contract and joined Japanese club Yokohama F. Marinos. Degenek later reflected on his departure, saying that he needed to leave in order to keep his international status alive.

Degenek made his Yokohama F. Marinos debut in the opening game of the season, against Urawa Red Diamonds on 25 February 2017. Since making his Yokohama F. Marinos debut, Degenek established himself in the starting eleven for the side and started every match until he left to join the squad for the FIFA Confederations Cup. He also helped the side goes a 14 matches unbeaten. He then set up a goal for Takashi Kanai to help the side score the only goal in the game, in a 1–0 win over Ventforet Kofu. Despite later being demoted to the substitute bench at the end of the 2017 season, Degenek finished his first season at the club, making 28 appearances in all competitions. For his performance, he was named in the J.League Young Players' Best XI.

Ahead of the 2018 season, the club saw a change of new management, as Ange Postecoglou was appointed as new manager, who first called him up for the senior team. Degenek also signed a new contract with the club as well. At the start of the 2018 season, Degenek continued to establish himself in the starting eleven, playing in the centre-back position. He then scored his first goal for the club, in a 4–4 draw against Shonan Bellmare on 21 April 2018. A month later, on 16 May 2018, he scored again in the J.League Cup Group Stage, in a 2–1 win over Albirex Niigata. Three days later, on 19 May 2018, Degenek scored his third goal of the season, in a 5–2 win over V-Varen Nagasaki, in what turns out to be his last appearance for Yokohama F. Marinos. He went on to make 15 appearances and scoring 3 times for the side in all competitions.

=== Red Star Belgrade ===
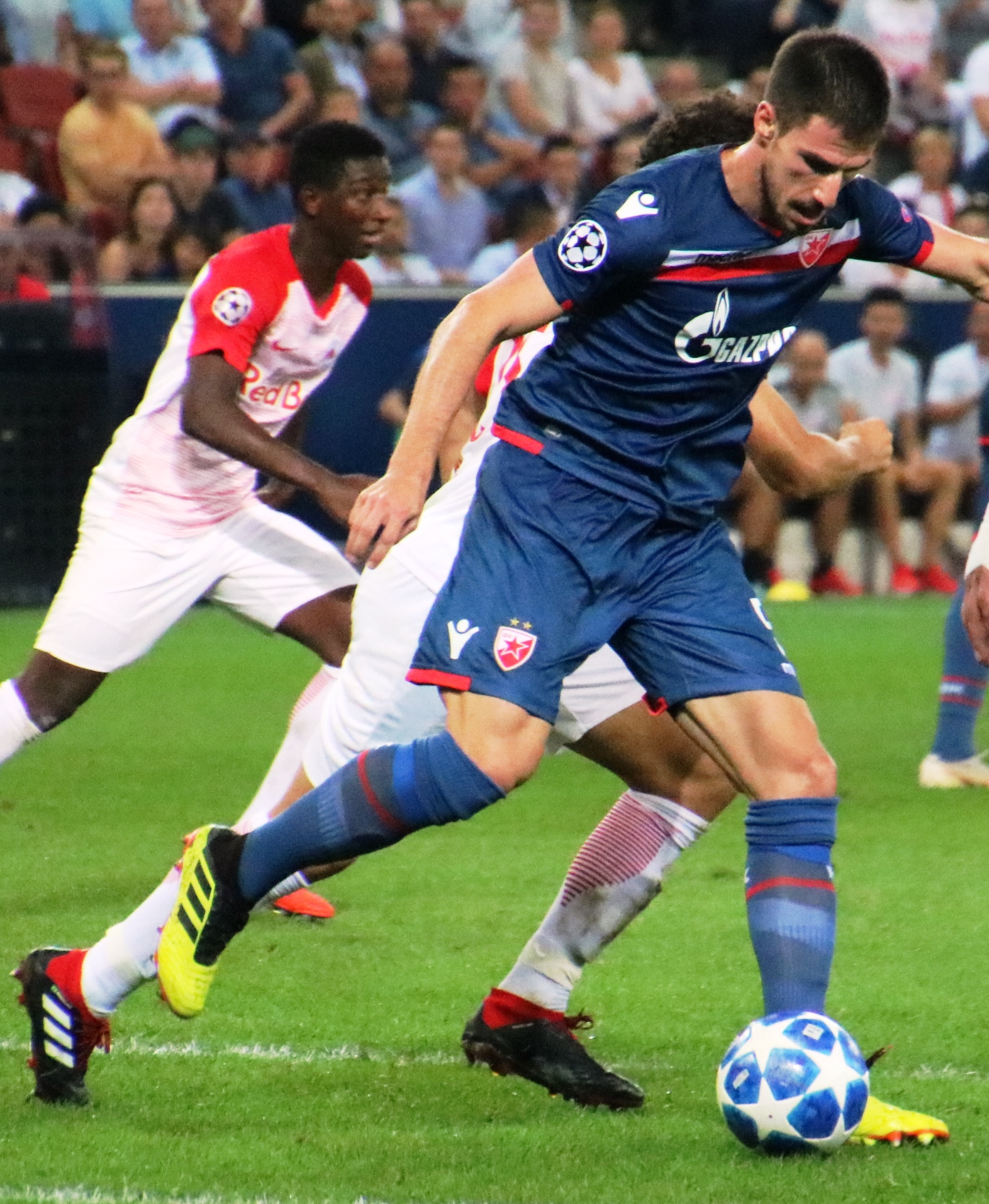
Degenek with Red Star Belgrade in 2018

On 5 July 2018, Degenek joined Red Star Belgrade, penning a three-year contract with his new club. The transfer fee was unofficially reported as €200k. Degenek was officially announced as a new signing the next day, choosing to wear the number 5 jersey.

Degenek made his debut for his boyhood club in the first second match of the First qualifying round for 2018–19 UEFA Champions League campaign, against Spartaks Jūrmala, playing as a central defender in tandem with Vujadin Savić. Several days later, on 20 July 2018, Degenek made his Serbian SuperLiga debut in 3–0 victory over Dinamo Vranje, pairing with Srđan Babić. On 29 August 2018, Degenek had two assists in a 2–2 draw to Red Bull Salzburg, after which Red Star Belgrade qualified to the group stage of the 2018–19 UEFA Champions League.

=== Al-Hilal ===
On 12 January 2019, Degenek was transferred to Saudi Arabian club Al-Hilal for €3 million, signing a three-and-a-half-year contract. On 23 April 2019, he was chosen as man of the match in the 1–0 victory against Esteghlal in the group stage of the 2019 AFC Champions League.

=== Return to Red Star Belgrade ===
On 22 July 2019, having been with Al-Hilal for just over six months, Degenek was loaned to his former club, Red Star Belgrade. Al-Hilal and Red Star agreed on a one-year loan with a purchase option for €1.5 million. After just two games, Red Star activated the purchase clause, bringing Degenek back to "the Red-Whites". Degenek scored in a 2–2 draw in the first leg of the 2019 Champions league play-off round against BSC Young Boys. Red Star would end up advancing due to away goals which enabled them appear in their second consecutive Champions League group stage. On 25 September, Degenek scored his first league goal for Red Star, a 3–1 victory over FK Voždovac. On 4 November 2021, Degenek received a direct red card in a 1–0 UEFA Europa League loss to FC Midtjylland.

=== Columbus Crew ===
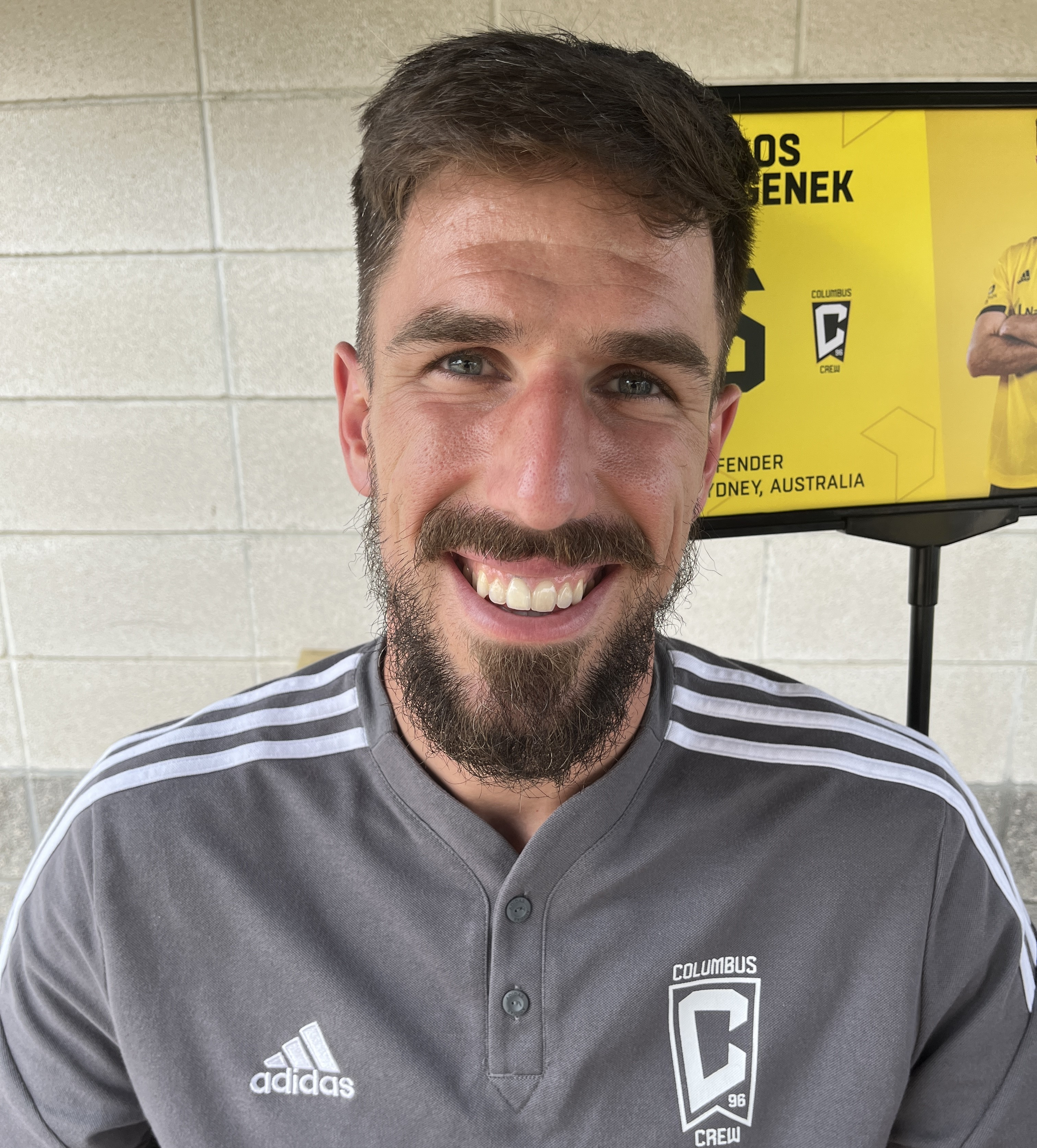
Degenek at a Columbus Crew event in 2022

On 24 January 2022, it was announced that Degenek had signed for American side Columbus Crew, with Degenek himself stating that the move to Major League Soccer was driven due to the World Cup and wanting to stay fit, due to no longer being a first choice option for Red Star. "That probably helped me a bit decide on where I'm going to play." Degenek said. On 1 September, Degenek was included in the MLS Team of the Week for his performance in a 1–0 win versus Inter Miami CF.

=== Second return to Red Star Belgrade ===
On 24 July 2023, it was announced that Degenek had returned to Red Star Belgrade for an undisclosed fee.

== International career ==
Degenek was eligible to play for Serbia, Croatia and Australia; he holds both Serbian and Australian citizenships.

=== Youth career ===
Degenek captained the national under-15 team of Australia in two friendlies against Japan in April 2009.

For the Australia under-16 team Degenek made on 6 October 2009 against Laos his first appearance in the 2010 AFC U-16 Championship qualification. He scored his first goal for this team on 16 October 2009 against Malaysia. Degenek was part of the Australian team which reached the semi-final of the final tournament of the 2010 AFC U-16 Championship.

At the Australia U17 side, Degenek scored his first Australia U17 goal, in a 4–3 against Portugal U17 on 26 August 2010. In the 2011 FIFA U-17 World Cup Miloš Degenek made two appearances for the Australia national under-17 team.

On 11 October 2012, Degenek made his debut for the Serbia national under-19 team against Turkey. Although he represented the U19 side, Degenek reflected on his switch, quoting: "I represented Serbia under 19s in eight games at a time where I was unsure of whether I was wanted in the Australian national set-up. But two years ago I was given the opportunity to represent the Olyroos and, later, the Socceroos. I knew that's what I wanted to do." Degenek went on to make eight appearances for the side.

On 26 August 2015, Degenek was called up to the Olyroos squad against Turkey and FYR Macedonia. He made his Olyroos debut on 4 September 2015, where he played the full 90 minutes in a 1–0 win over Turkey.

=== Senior career ===
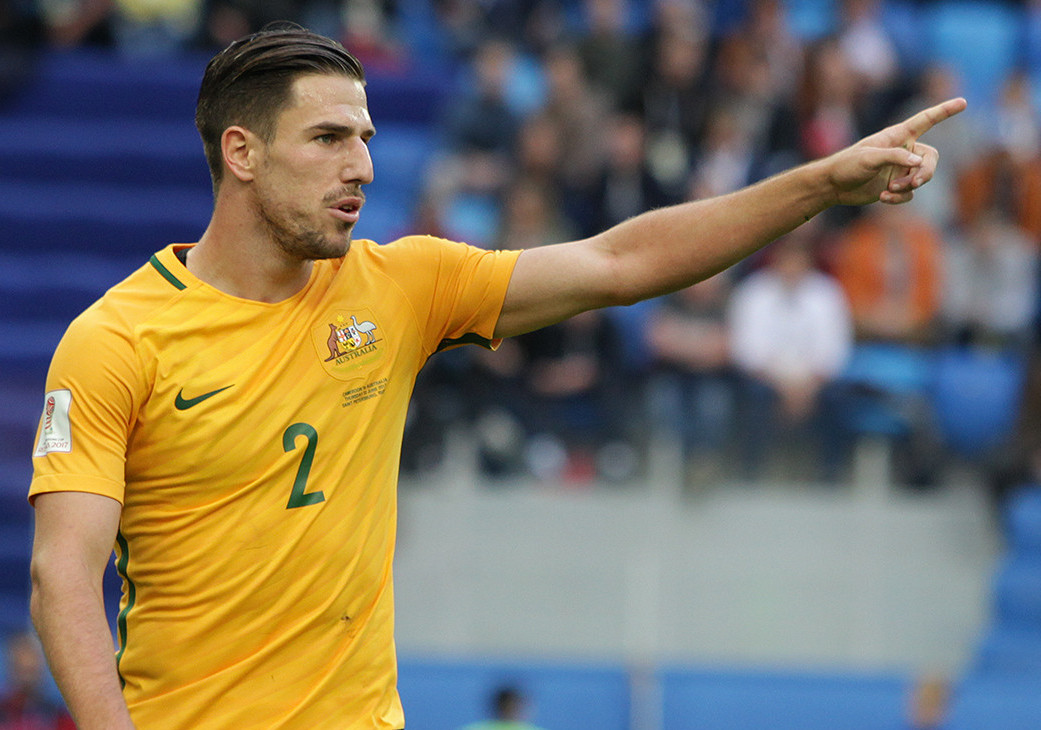
Degenek playing for Australia at the 2017 FIFA Confederations Cup

Degenek made his Australia national team debut against England on 27 May 2016, coming on as a second-half substitute. He set up Australia's only goal in a 2–1 loss, his cross from the right forcing English defender Eric Dier to head into his own goal. He made his first start a week later, playing a full match in a win over Greece.

Degenek then received a lot of playing time under the management of Ange Postecoglou. On 31 May 2017, it was announced that Degenek made it to the final cut for the FIFA Confederations Cup squad. Degenek played two times in the tournament, which were against Germany and Cameroon. However, he was dropped to the substitute bench on the last game of the group stage, as they drew 1–1 against Chile.

Degenek continued to feature in the AFC fourth round against Syria, where he played both legs, in a 3–2 win on aggregate to qualify for the CONCACAF–AFC play-off against Honduras. In the CONCACAF–AFC play-off, Degenek played once in the first leg, as Australia won 3–1 to qualify for the World Cup.

In May 2018 he was named in Australia's 23-man squad for the 2018 FIFA World Cup in Russia. However, Degenek did not play in any of the three group stage matches, as Australia were eventually eliminated from the tournament.

On 30 December 2018, Degenek scored his first international goal for the Australian national team during an international friendly against Oman in the UAE. The goal came from a near post flick, as Degenek redirected a low corner kick from Chris Ikonomidis. The ball deflected over the defenders and found its way into the net on the far post side of the goal. In a post-match interview, Degenek acknowledged that the goal involved a "fair bit of luck," but also expressed that it held special significance for him.

During the quarterfinals of the 2019 AFC Asian Cup, Degenek made an errant back-pass to goalkeeper Mathew Ryan that proved costly. United Arab Emirates striker Ali Mabkhout was able to intercept the pass and score the only goal in a 1–0 defeat, knocking the defending champion Socceroos out of the tournament.

On 8 November 2022, Degenek was selected to his second World Cup tournament, being named in Australia's 26-man squad for the 2022 FIFA World Cup in Qatar. He made his World Cup debut against France, coming on as a second-half substitute in a 4–1 defeat. Degenek would go on to play in all four of Australia's World Cup matches, losing in the round of 16 to eventual champions Argentina.

On 31 May 2026, Degenek was selected in the 26-man squad for the 2026 FIFA World Cup.

== Personal life ==
Degenek has an older brother, Đorđe Degenek. In addition to speaking Serbian, Degenek speaks English and German; In 2018 after joining Yokohama F. Marinos, he was learning Japanese.

Degenek used his salary to help his parents and brother, quoting: "My family supported me when I was little. Now I support them."

Degenek supports Red Star Belgrade, and stated that his dream centre-back partner would be Sergio Ramos.

== Career statistics ==
=== Club ===
As of 8 June 2026

Appearances and goals by club, season and competition
Club	Season	League			National cup		League cup		Continental		Total	
Club	Season	Division	Apps	Goals	Apps	Goals	Apps	Goals	Apps	Goals	Apps	Goals
VfB Stuttgart II	2012–13	3. Liga	0	0	0	0	—		—		0	0
VfB Stuttgart II	2013–14	3. Liga	9	0	0	0	—		—		9	0
VfB Stuttgart II	2014–15	3. Liga	0	0	0	0	—		—		0	0
VfB Stuttgart II	Total		9	0	0	0	0	0	0	0	9	0
1860 Munich	2015–16	2. Bundesliga	25	1	3	0	—		—		28	1
1860 Munich	2016–17	2. Bundesliga	7	0	1	0	—		—		8	0
1860 Munich	Total		32	1	4	0	0	0	0	0	36	1
Yokohama F. Marinos	2017	J1 League	25	0	2	0	1	0	—		28	0
Yokohama F. Marinos	2018	J1 League	12	2	0	0	3	1	—		15	3
Yokohama F. Marinos	Total		37	2	2	0	4	1	0	0	43	3
Red Star Belgrade	2018–19	Serbian SuperLiga	20	0	0	0	—		13 (Note: Appearance(s) in UEFA Champions League)	0	33	0
Al-Hilal	2018–19	Saudi Professional League	11	0	2	0	—		5 (Note: Appearances in AFC Champions League)	0	18	0
Red Star Belgrade	2019–20	Serbian SuperLiga	23	2	3	0	—		11	1	37	3
Red Star Belgrade	2020–21	Serbian SuperLiga	30	0	5	0	—		12 (Note: Three appearances in UEFA Champions League, nine appearances in UEFA Europa League)	0	47	0
Red Star Belgrade	2021–22	Serbian SuperLiga	7	0	1	0	—		7 (Note: One appearance in UEFA Champions League, six appearances in UEFA Europa League)	0	15	0
Red Star Belgrade	Total		60	2	9	0	0	0	30	1	99	3
Columbus Crew	2022	Major League Soccer	28	0	0	0	—		—		28	0
Columbus Crew	2023	Major League Soccer	12	0	1	0	—		—		13	0
Columbus Crew	Total		40	0	1	0	0	0	0	0	41	0
Red Star Belgrade	2023–24	Serbian SuperLiga	6	0	1	0	—		1	0	8	0
Red Star Belgrade	2024–25	Serbian SuperLiga	1	0	0	0	—		0	0	1	0
Red Star Belgrade	Total		7	0	1	0	0	0	1	0	9	0
TSC	2024–25	Serbian SuperLiga	16	0	3	0	—		2 (Note: Appearances in UEFA Conference League)	0	21	0
TSC	2025–26	Serbian SuperLiga	13	1	0	0	—		—		13	1
TSC	Total		29	1	3	0	0	0	0	0	32	1
APOEL FC	2025–26	Cypriot First Division	10	1	1	0	—		—		11	1
Career total			255	7	22	0	4	1	51	1	233	9

=== International ===
As of match played 6 June 2026

Appearances and goals by national team and year
National team	Year	Apps	Goals
Australia	2016	5	0
Australia	2017	10	0
Australia	2018	5	1
Australia	2019	8	0
Australia	2020	0	0
Australia	2021	5	0
Australia	2022	9	0
Australia	2023	3	0
Australia	2024	0	0
Australia	2025	9	0
Australia	2026	3	0
Total		57	1

Scores and results list Australia's goal tally first, score column indicates score after each Degenek goal.

List of international goals scored by Miloš Degenek
No.	Date	Venue	Cap	Opponent	Score	Result	Competition
1	30 December 2018	Maktoum bin Rashid Al Maktoum Stadium, Dubai, United Arab Emirates	20	Oman	4–0	5–0	Friendly

== Honours ==
Red Star Belgrade

- Serbian SuperLiga: 2018–19, 2019–20, 2020–21, 2023–24
- Serbian Cup: 2020–21, 2023–24

Al Hilal SFC

- AFC Champions League: 2019

== Notes ==
1. At the time of his birth, Knin was part of the self-proclaimed Republic of Serbian Krajina.
