= Mathew Leckie =

Australian soccer player (born 1991)

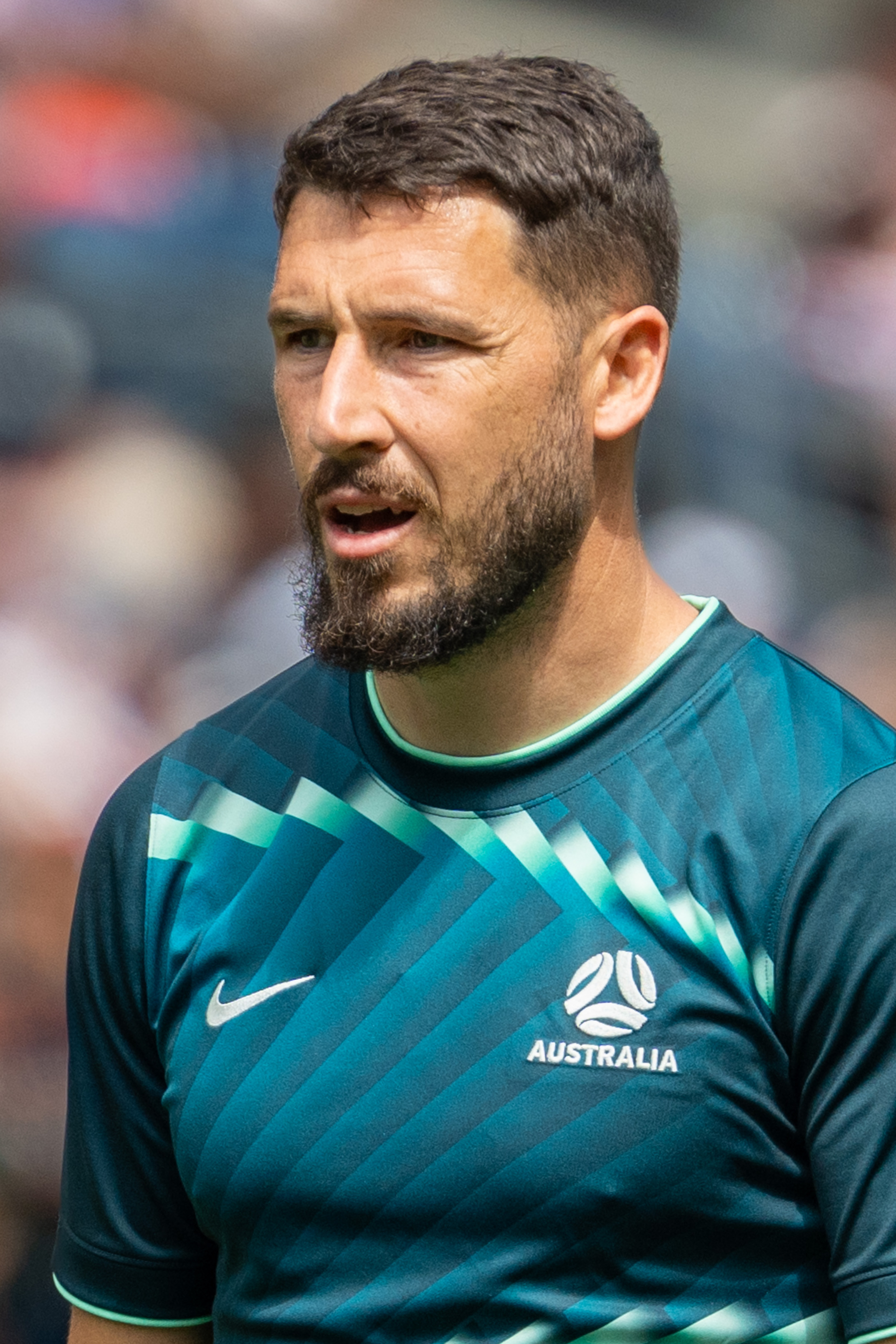
- Leckie with Australia in 2026

Personal information
- Full name: Mathew Allan Leckie
- Date of birth: 4 February 1991 (age 35)
- Place of birth: Melbourne, Victoria, Australia
- Height: 1.81 m (5 ft 11 in)
- Positions: Winger; central midfielder

Team information
- Current team: Melbourne City
- Number: 7

Youth career
- Brimbank Stallions
- 2007: Bulleen Lions

Senior career*
Years	Team	Apps	(Gls)
2008–2009	Bulleen Lions	27	(15)
2009–2011	Adelaide United	35	(8)
2011–2013	Borussia Mönchengladbach II	10	(3)
2011–2012	Borussia Mönchengladbach	9	(0)
2012–2013	→ FSV Frankfurt II (loan)	5	(4)
2012–2013	→ FSV Frankfurt (loan)	28	(4)
2013–2014	FSV Frankfurt	31	(10)
2014–2017	Ingolstadt 04	94	(10)
2017–2021	Hertha BSC	68	(7)
2019	Hertha BSC II	1	(0)
2021–	Melbourne City	79	(18)

International career^{‡}
2009–2011	Australia U20	13	(3)
2012–	Australia	81	(14)
Medal record
Representing Australia
Men's Association football
AFC Asian Cup
Winner	2015 Australia
AFC U-20 Asian Cup
Runner-up	2010 China
- * Club domestic league appearances and goals as of 5 Nov 2024 ‡ National team caps and goals as of 19 June 2026

Mathew Allan Leckie (born 4 February 1991) is an Australian soccer player who plays for A-League club Melbourne City and the Australia national team. Historically a quick and agile player, Leckie was usually placed on the wing, however more recently has been regularly deployed as a central midfielder.

== Club career ==
=== Early life ===
As a child growing up in Melbourne's Western Suburbs, Leckie actually aspired to play Australian rules football, his family supporting Essendon and Box Hill, however at 11 years old a change to a school in Sunshine North with a more multicultural student body and close friends inspired him to take up football and he "never looked back".

Leckie was a member of Victorian State League Division 1 outfit, Bulleen Lions until 2 September 2009, where Leckie was signed to Adelaide United for a two-year professional contract.

=== Adelaide United ===
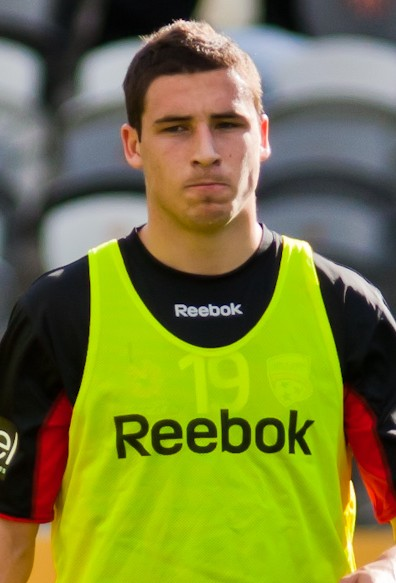
Leckie with Adelaide United in 2010

He made his A-League debut on 18 September for Adelaide United coming on as a substitute in the 75th minute against Melbourne Victory.

Leckie scored the winning goal in his first AFC Champions League match on 24 February 2010, against the reigning champions Pohang Steelers at Hindmarsh Stadium. He followed this up by scoring his second goal in as many games against Shandong Luneng in Adelaide's 2–0 win on Match Day 2 of the Champions League. Leckie was considered to be one of Australia's best young players. Leckie started the 2010–11 season with a bang, scoring twice in Adelaide's first five games, earning wide praise for his entertaining and robust style of play and winning the favour of the Australian U19 side for their competing in the 2010 AFC Under-19 championships.

=== Borussia Mönchengladbach ===
At the end of the A-League season he signed for German side Borussia Mönchengladbach. He scored his first goals for his new club with a double in a 5–2 friendly win against Aberdeen on 9 July 2011. In early 2013, he was loaned out to Frankfurt and has since scored 3 goals in only 2 appearances for the reserve team.

=== FSV Frankfurt ===
On 3 June 2013, Leckie made his loan move to FSV Frankfurt permanent, signing a three-year contract that would run until 2016. Leckie stated the move was made to maximise his personal development and to build on the successes of his first season spent at FSV on loan where he made 28 appearances and scored 4 goals.

=== FC Ingolstadt 04 ===
On 7 May 2014, he signed a three-year contract with FC Ingolstadt 04. While playing for Ingolstadt, the club was promoted to the Bundesliga at the end of the 2014–15 season. In the 2015–16 Bundesliga season Leckie scored a goal against FC Augsburg, which was one of three goals he scored that season and one of the season's best goals.

=== Hertha BSC ===
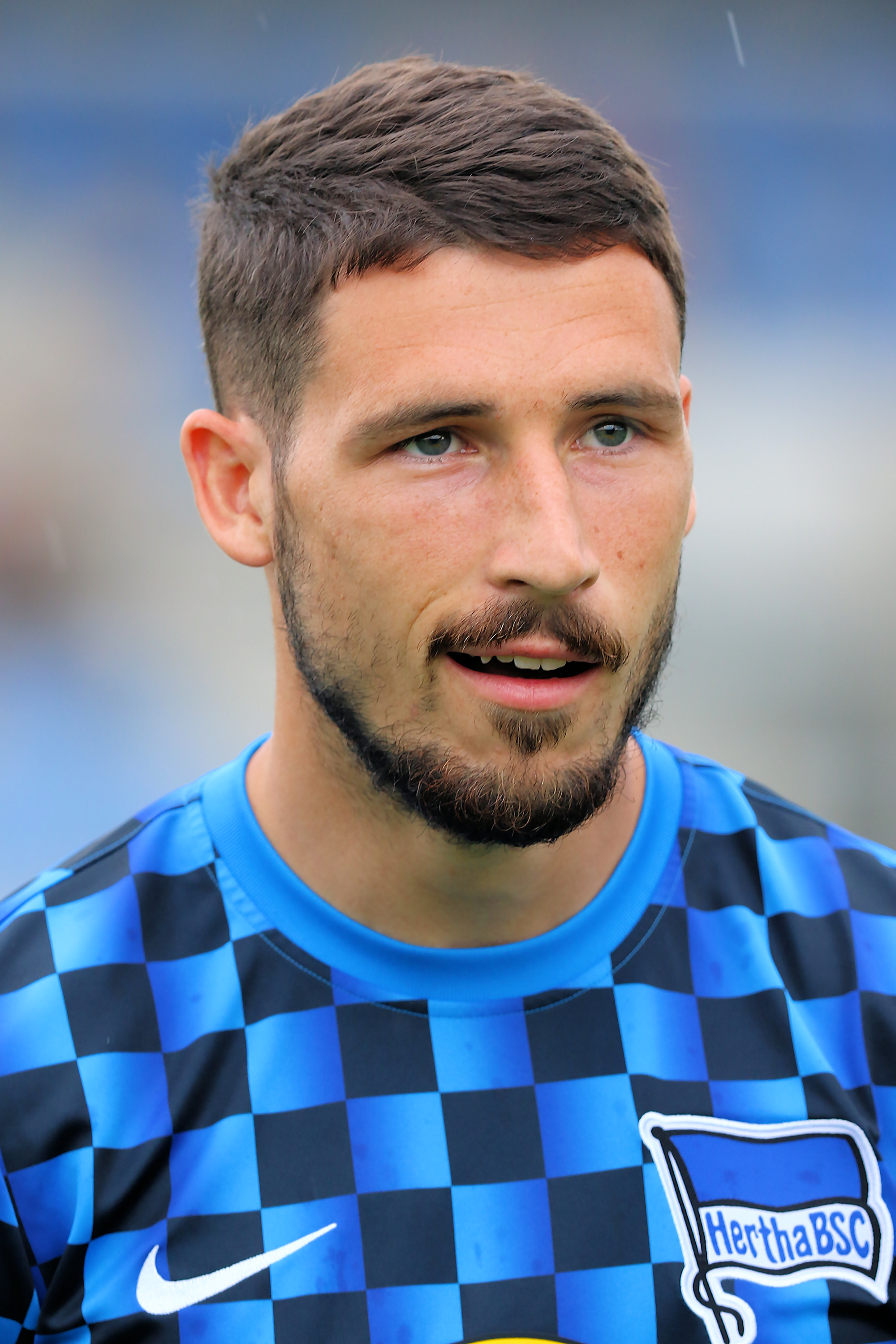
Leckie with Hertha BSC in 2019

On 22 May 2017, it was announced that Leckie had signed for Hertha BSC for the 2017–18 season. He began his spell positively, appearing in many pre-season matches and assisting two goals in his first competitive appearance for the club in the first round of the DFB Pokal against Hansa Rostock. Leckie scored two goals on his debut for Hertha BSC on matchday one of the 2017–18 Bundesliga season against VfB Stuttgart in a 2–0 home victory. After the game Leckie said: "It's probably one of the best weeks of my life, so I'm definitely a happy guy at the moment."

Leckie scored his first European goal in a 3–2 away defeat to Athletic Bilbao in the 2017–18 Europa League on 23 November 2017.

Since the 2019–20 season, Leckie has played a combined total of thirteen matches in all competitions for Hertha (excluding his one appearance for Hertha BSC II in Regionalliga Nordost [IV]), compared to his forty-eight in the previous two. Leckie has also scored zero goals in the latter two seasons and eight in the former. It was reported in early 2020 that Leckie wanted to leave Hertha BSC, with Leckie stating: "[I'll] do everything I can to leave," adding that "I wanted to leave [before this season] and I had the feeling a lot would change." In May 2020, Leckie decided to stay with Hertha BSC for another season when he stated on the Fox Football Podcast, "...so for family reasons I decided to stay here for another season."

=== Melbourne City FC ===
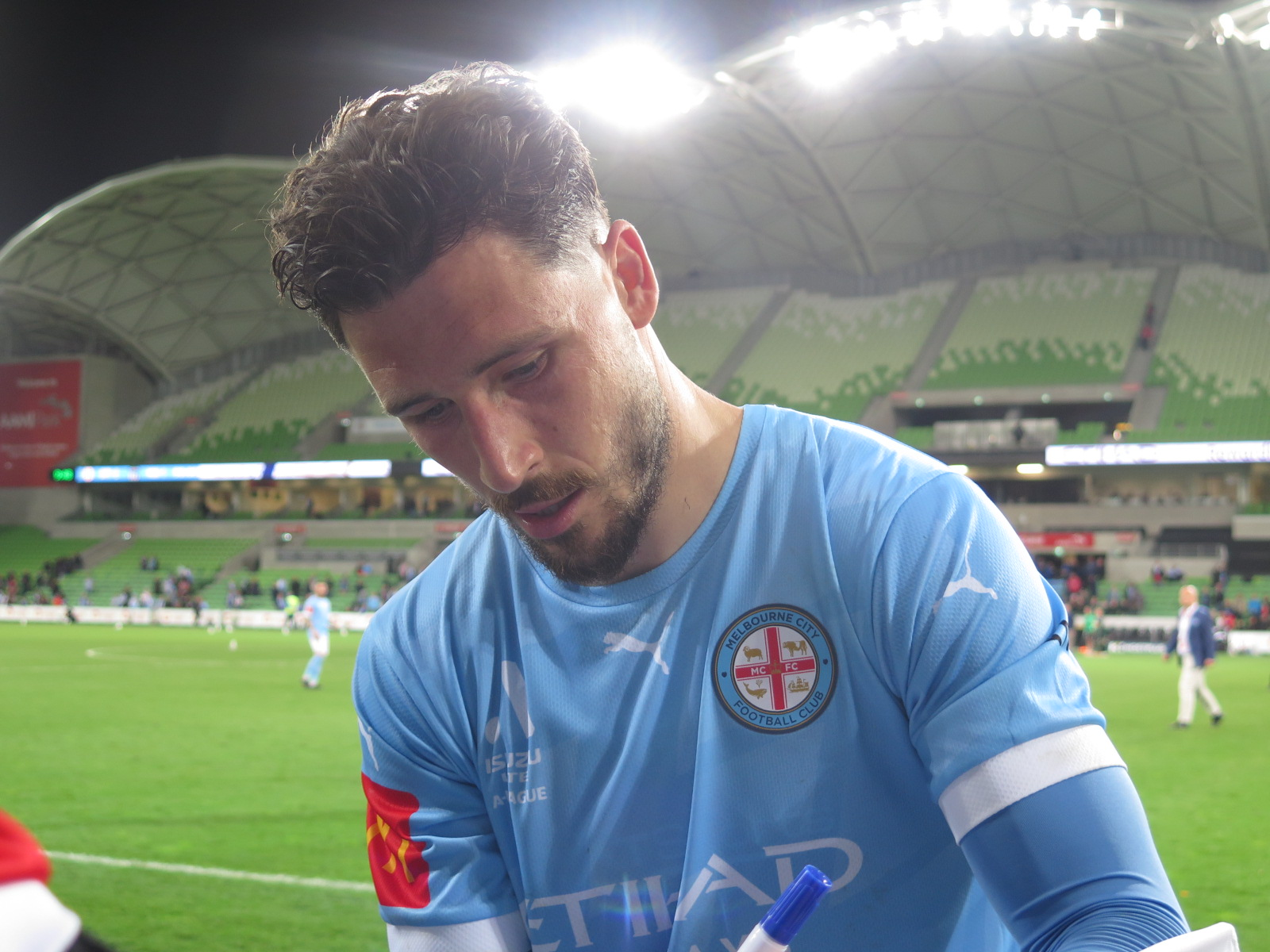
Leckie with Melbourne City in 2022

On 5 June 2021, it was announced that Leckie had signed a three-year deal to join Melbourne City FC.

Leckie was awarded the Joe Marston Medal in the 2025 A-League Men Grand Final for Melbourne City as they defeated Melbourne Victory 1–0 in the first ever Melbourne Derby grand final.

== International career ==
In August 2009, Leckie was selected to represent Australia in the AFF U19 Youth Championship 2009, where he opened up the score-sheet in the 4–1 win over hosts, Vietnam, in the semi-finals. Mathew was called up to the Australian Under-19s for the 2010 AFC U-19 Championship.

In February 2010, ex-Australian National Coach, Pim Verbeek, named Leckie in the 25 man Socceroos squad for the AFC Asian Cup 2011 Qualifier against Indonesia. Leckie didn't make an appearance in the game which Australia won 1–0 to book their place in the Asian Cup.

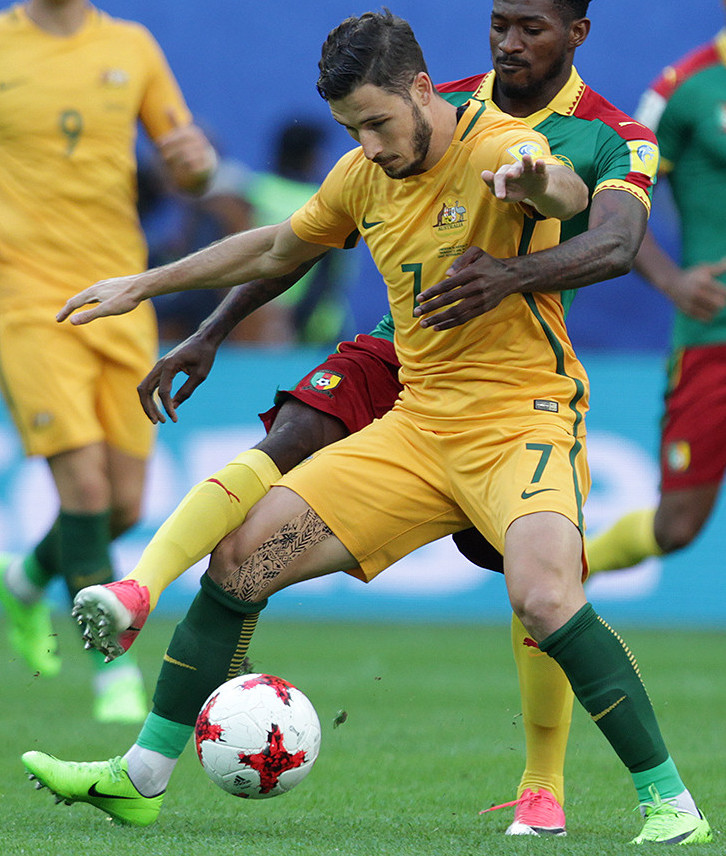
Leckie playing for Australia against Cameroon at the 2017 Confederations Cup.

Ex-Australian national coach Holger Osieck included Leckie in the squad for the international friendly against the Republic of Korea on 14 November 2012. Leckie came on as a late substitution with only limited time on the ball.

Australian National Coach, Ange Postecoglou, included Leckie in the squad for the international friendly against Costa Rica on 19 November 2013.

=== 2014 World Cup ===
Leckie had an outstanding World Cup campaign resulting in pundits estimating his worth at $10 million. He was quoted saying he does not regret his decision to sign for German second division club FC Ingolstadt, recognising that he may have had offers from larger clubs following his World Cup performances. "So whether I could have maybe had other offers now after this World Cup if I hadn't signed, I never would have known."

=== 2015 Asian Cup ===
Leckie was named as part of Australia's 2015 AFC Asian Cup squad. He started Australia's first game of the tournament against Kuwait, hitting the crossbar in the second half, and then providing the assist for James Troisi to score Australia's fourth goal of the match and helping Australia to a 4–1 win.

=== 2017 Confederations Cup ===
Leckie took part in Australia's hopes of success in the 2017 Confederations Cup after the squad was announced in May 2017. He started the first two group matches and came on as a substitute in the last group match in the 57th minute against Chile.

=== 2018 World Cup ===
On 3 September 2015, Leckie scored his second goal for Australia, and his first since 2013, opening the scoring against Bangladesh in a 2018 FIFA World Cup qualifier. On 5 September 2017, Leckie scored his 6th international goal for Australia against Thailand.

In May 2018, he was named in Australia's 23-man squad for the 2018 FIFA World Cup in Russia.

=== Captaincy ===
In May 2021, he was named the new captain of the Socceroos, replacing the retired Mark Milligan. Later in 2021 Leckie withdrew indefinitely from the national team, due to hotel quarantine requirements imposed on overseas travelers due to the COVID-19 pandemic.

=== 2022 World Cup ===
In November 2022, Leckie was included in the squad for the 2022 World Cup. In the third and final crucial group game against Denmark, he scored the winner in a 1–0 victory that ensured qualification to the round of 16.

=== 2026 World Cup ===
On 31 May 2026, Leckie was selected in the 26-man squad for the 2026 FIFA World Cup. He made his tournament debut in Australia's second group-stage match against the United States, making his 11th FIFA World Cup appearance, a new Australian record. Aged 35 years and 250 days, he also became Australia's oldest outfield player to start a match at a World Cup, behind only goalkeeper Mark Schwarzer overall, and only the second Australian, after Tim Cahill and Mark Milligan to feature in four World Cup tournaments. However, he sustained a leg injury during the match, forcing him to miss the remainder of the tournament.

== Career statistics ==
=== Club ===
As of match played 5 May 2024

Appearances and goals by club, season and competition
Club	Season	League			National cup (Note: Includes DFB-Pokal, Australia Cup)		Continental		Total	
Club	Season	Division	Apps	Goals	Apps	Goals	Apps	Goals	Apps	Goals
Bulleen Royals	2008	Victorian State League Division 1	11	1	—		—		11	1
Bulleen Lions	2009	Victorian State League Division 1	16	14	—		—		16	14
Bulleen Lions	Total		27	15	—		—		27	15
Adelaide United	2009–10	A-League	20	3	—		—		20	3
Adelaide United	2010–11	A-League	15	5	—		6 (Note: Appearance(s) in AFC Champions League)	2	21	7
Adelaide United	Total		35	8	—		6	2	41	10
Borussia Mönchengladbach	2011–12	Bundesliga	9	0	2	0	—		11	0
Borussia Mönchengladbach II	2011–12	Regionalliga West	10	3	—		—		10	3
FSV Frankfurt	2012–13	2. Bundesliga	28	4	2	1	—		30	5
FSV Frankfurt	2013–14	2. Bundesliga	31	10	2	2	—		33	12
FSV Frankfurt	Total		59	14	4	3	—		63	17
FSV Frankfurt II	2012–13	Regionalliga Südwest	5	4	—		—		5	4
FC Ingolstadt	2014–15	2. Bundesliga	32	7	0	0	—		32	7
FC Ingolstadt	2015–16	Bundesliga	32	3	0	0	—		32	3
FC Ingolstadt	2016–17	Bundesliga	30	0	2	0	—		32	0
FC Ingolstadt	Total		94	10	2	0	—		96	10
Hertha BSC	2017–18	Bundesliga	26	5	1	0	2 (Note: Appearances in UEFA Europa League)	1	29	6
Hertha BSC	2018–19	Bundesliga	18	2	1	0	—		19	2
Hertha BSC	2019–20	Bundesliga	7	0	2	0	—		9	0
Hertha BSC	2020–21	Bundesliga	17	0	1	0	—		18	0
Hertha BSC	Total		68	7	5	0	2	1	75	8
Hertha BSC II	2019–20	Regionalliga Nordost	1	0	—		—		1	0
Melbourne City	2021–22	A-League Men	23	9	2	1	1	0	26	10
Melbourne City	2022–23	A-League Men	22	7	2	1	—		24	8
Melbourne City	2023–24	A-League Men	13	1	2	0	2	0	17	1
Melbourne City	Total		58	17	6	2	3	0	67	19
Career total			366	78	19	5	11	3	396	86

=== International ===
As of match played 19 June 2026

Appearances and goals by national team and year
National team	Year	Apps	Goals
Australia	2012	1	0
Australia	2013	4	1
Australia	2014	11	0
Australia	2015	12	1
Australia	2016	9	1
Australia	2017	12	3
Australia	2018	10	3
Australia	2019	4	2
Australia	2020	0	0
Australia	2021	4	2
Australia	2022	10	1
Australia	2023	1	0
Australia	2024	1	0
Australia	2025	0	0
Australia	2026	3	0
Total		81	14

As of match played 30 November 2022. Australia score listed first, score column indicates score after each Leckie goal.

International goals by date, venue, cap, opponent, score, result and competition
No.	Date	Venue	Cap	Opponent	Score	Result	Competition
1	15 October 2013	Craven Cottage, London, England	4	Canada	3–0	3–0	Friendly
2	3 September 2015	Perth Oval, Perth, Australia	26	Bangladesh	1–0	5–0	2018 FIFA World Cup qualification
3	4 June 2016	Stadium Australia, Sydney, Australia	31	Greece	1–0	1–0	Friendly
4	23 March 2017	PAS Stadium, Teheran, Iran	38	Iraq	1–0	1–1	2018 FIFA World Cup qualification
5	28 March 2017	Sydney Football Stadium, Sydney, Australia	39	United Arab Emirates	2–0	2–0	2018 FIFA World Cup qualification
6	5 September 2017	Melbourne Rectangular Stadium, Melbourne, Australia	46	Thailand	2–1	2–1	2018 FIFA World Cup qualification
7	1 June 2018	NV Arena, Sankt Pölten, Austria	52	Czech Republic	1–0	4–0	Friendly
8	1 June 2018	NV Arena, Sankt Pölten, Austria	52	Czech Republic	3–0	4–0	Friendly
9	20 November 2018	Stadium Australia, Sydney, Australia	59	Lebanon	3–0	3–0	Friendly
10	10 September 2019	Al Kuwait Sports Club Stadium, Kuwait City, Kuwait	62	Kuwait	1–0	3–0	2022 FIFA World Cup qualification
11	10 September 2019	Al Kuwait Sports Club Stadium, Kuwait City, Kuwait	62	Kuwait	2–0	3–0	2022 FIFA World Cup qualification
12	3 June 2021	Jaber Al-Ahmad International Stadium, Kuwait City, Kuwait	64	Kuwait	1–0	3–0	2022 FIFA World Cup qualification
13	11 June 2021	Jaber Al-Ahmad International Stadium, Kuwait City, Kuwait	65	Nepal	1–0	3–0	2022 FIFA World Cup qualification
14	30 November 2022	Al Janoub Stadium, Al Wakrah, Qatar	76	Denmark	1–0	1–0	2022 FIFA World Cup

== Honours ==
Ingolstadt 04

- 2. Bundesliga: 2014–15

Melbourne City

- A-League Men Championship: 2025
- A-League Men Premiership: 2021–22, 2022–23

Australia

- AFC Asian Cup: 2015

Australia U-20

- AFC U-20 Asian Cup: runner-up 2010
- AFF U19 Youth Championship: 2010

Individual

- Adelaide United Rising Star: 2009–10
- A-Leagues All Star: 2022, 2024
- PFA A-League Team of the Season: 2022–23
- Joe Marston Medal: 2025
