= Australia men's national soccer team results =

A list of Australia national soccer team results:

- Australia national soccer team results (1922–1949)
- Australia national soccer team results (1950–1979)
- Australia national soccer team results (1980–1999)
- Australia national soccer team results (2000–2019)
- Australia national soccer team results (2020–present)
- 2010 Australia national soccer team season
- 2011 Australia national soccer team season
- 2012 Australia national soccer team season
- 2013 Australia national soccer team season
- 2014 Australia national soccer team season
- 2015 Australia national soccer team season
- 2016 Australia national soccer team season
- 2017 Australia national soccer team season
- 2018 Australia national soccer team season
- 2019 Australia national soccer team season
- ~~2020 Australia national soccer team season~~
- 2021 Australia national soccer team season
- 2022 Australia national soccer team season
- 2023 Australia national soccer team season
- 2024 Australia national soccer team season
- 2025 Australia national soccer team season
- 2026 Australia national soccer team season
