= 2012 Australia national soccer team season =

Australia
2012 season
- Chairman: Frank Lowy
- Manager: Holger Osieck
Home colours	Away colours

This page summarises the Australia national soccer team fixtures and results in 2012.

== Summary ==
The year started with Australia topping their group in the third round of the AFC World Cup Qualifiers. During the fourth round, Australia had collected just five points from the first four games. Australia finished the year by debuting in the preliminary rounds of the East Asian Cup and successfully topped the group to qualify for the finals.

== Record ==
Type	GP	W	D	L	GF	GA
Friendly matches	4	2	0	2	6	6
World Cup qualifiers	5	2	2	1	8	6
East Asian Cup	4	3	1	0	19	1
Total	13	7	3	3	33	13

== Match results ==
All times are in the Western Australian time zone, UTC+8.

=== Friendlies ===
2 June 2012	Denmark	2–0	Australia	Copenhagen, Denmark
23:00 UTC+8	Agger 31' (pen.); Bjelland 67'	Report; Summary		Stadium: Parken Stadium; Attendance: 15,888; Referee: Antonio Damato (Italy)

16 August 2012	Scotland	3–1	Australia	Edinburgh, Scotland
03:00 UTC+8	Rhodes 29'; Davidson 63' (o.g.); McCormack 76'	Summary	Bresciano 18'	Stadium: Easter Road; Attendance: 11,110; Referee: Tom Hagen (Norway)

7 September 2012	Lebanon	0–3	Australia	Sidon, Lebanon
01:30 UTC+8		Summary	Cahill 20'; McKay 23'; Thompson 88'	Stadium: Saida Municipal Stadium; Attendance: 7,000; Referee: Konstantinos Nikolaidis (Greece)

14 November 2012	South Korea	1–2	Australia	Hwaseong, South Korea
18:00 UTC+8	Lee Dong-Gook 12'	Summary	Rukavytsya 44'; Cornthwaite 88'	Stadium: Hwaseong Stadium; Referee: Wang Zhe (China)

=== World Cup qualifiers ===
29 February 2012 Third Round	Australia	4–2	Saudi Arabia	Melbourne, Australia
17:30 UTC+8	Brosque 43', 75'; Kewell 73'; Emerton 76'	Report; Summary	Al-Dossari 19'; Al-Shamrani 45+2'	Stadium: AAMI Park; Attendance: 24,240; Referee: Dong-Jin Kim (South Korea)

8 June 2012 Fourth Round	Oman	0–0	Australia	Muscat, Oman
21:00 UTC+8		Report; Summary		Stadium: Sultan Qaboos Sports Complex; Attendance: 11,000; Referee: Alireza Faghani (Iran)

12 June 2012 Fourth Round	Australia	1–1	Japan	Brisbane, Australia
18:00 UTC+8	Milligan (yellow card) 25' (yellow-red card) 55'; Wilkshire 69' (pen.)	Report; Summary	Kurihara 64'; Kurihara (yellow card) 23' (yellow-red card) 89'	Stadium: Suncorp Stadium; Attendance: 40,189; Referee: Khalil Al Ghamdi (Saudi Arabia)

12 September 2012 Fourth Round	Jordan	2–1	Australia	Amman, Jordan
00:00 UTC+8	Abdel-Fattah 50' (pen.); Deeb 73'	Report	Thompson 85'	Stadium: Amman International Stadium; Referee: Abdullah Balideh (Qatar)

16 October 2012 Fourth Round	Iraq	1–2	Australia	Doha, Qatar (Note: Iraq will have to play their remaining home games of the 2014 FIFA World Cup qualifiers at a neutral venue following a ban by FIFA on playing in Iraq.)
22:15 UTC+8	Abdul-Zahra 72'	Report	Cahill 80'; Thompson 84'	Stadium: Grand Hamad Stadium; Referee: Lee Min-Hu (Korea Republic)

=== East Asian Cup ===
3 December 2012 Preliminary Round	Hong Kong	0–1	Australia	Hong Kong
20:30 UTC+8	Lam Hok Hei (yellow card) 88' (yellow-red card) 90'	Report	Emerton 85'	Stadium: Mong Kok Stadium; Attendance: 4,160; Referee: Jumpei Iida (Japan)

5 December 2012 Preliminary Round	North Korea	1–1	Australia	Hong Kong
20:30 UTC+8	Yong-Hak 64'	Report	Thompson 4'	Stadium: Hong Kong Stadium; Attendance: 989; Referee: Mongkolchai Pechsri (Thailand)

7 December 2012 Preliminary Round	Guam	0–9	Australia	Hong Kong
17:50 UTC+8		Report	Mooy 12'; Babalj 20', 56'; Marrone 43'; Thompson 59', 62', 65' (pen.); Milligan 71'; Garcia 83'	Stadium: Hong Kong Stadium; Referee: Wang Zhe (China PR)

9 December 2012 Preliminary Round	Australia	8–0	Chinese Taipei	Hong Kong
17:00 UTC+8	Garcia 11'; Cornthwaite 17'; Taggart 20', 29'; Behich 34', 57'; Mooy 47'; Yang Chao-hsun 82' (o.g.)	Report		Stadium: Hong Kong Stadium; Referee: Kim Dae-Yong (Korea Republic)

== Player statistics ==
=== Appearances and goals ===
As of 9 December 2012

No.	Pos	Nat	Player	Total		Friendlies		World Cup Qualifiers		East Asian Cup	
No.	Pos	Nat	Player	Apps	Goals	Apps	Goals	Apps	Goals	Apps	Goals
	GK	(Australia) AUS	Adam Federici	1	0	0+1	0	0+0	0	0+0	0
	GK	(Australia) AUS	Eugene Galeković	2	0	0+0	0	0+0	0	2+0	0
	GK	(Australia) AUS	Mathew Ryan	2	0	0+0	0	0+0	0	2+0	0
	GK	(Australia) AUS	Mark Schwarzer	9	0	4+0	0	5+0	0	0+0	0
	DF	(Australia) AUS	Aziz Behich	5	2	0+1	0	0+0	0	3+1	2
	DF	(Australia) AUS	David Carney	7	0	2+1	0	3+1	0	0+0	0
	DF	(Australia) AUS	Robert Cornthwaite	4	2	1+0	1	0+0	0	3+0	1
	DF	(Australia) AUS	Jason Davidson	1	0	0+1	0	0+0	0	0+0	0
	DF	(Australia) AUS	Dino Djulbic	2	0	0+0	0	0+0	0	2+0	0
	DF	(Australia) AUS	Ivan Franjic	3	0	0+0	0	0+0	0	3+0	0
	DF	(Australia) AUS	Scott Jamieson	2	0	0+0	0	0+0	0	2+0	0
	DF	(Australia) AUS	Michael Marrone	1	1	0+0	0	0+0	0	1+0	1
	DF	(Australia) AUS	Ryan McGowan	2	0	1+1	0	0+0	0	0+0	0
	DF	(Australia) AUS	Mark Milligan	6	1	0+1	0	1+1	0	3+0	1
	DF	(Australia) AUS	Lucas Neill	9	0	4+0	0	5+0	0	0+0	0
	DF	(Australia) AUS	Jade North	4	0	1+0	0	3+0	0	0+0	0
	DF	(Australia) AUS	Saša Ognenovski	6	0	2+0	0	4+0	0	0+0	0
	DF	(Australia) AUS	Matt Smith	3	0	0+0	0	0+0	0	3+0	0
	DF	(Australia) AUS	Matthew Špiranović	4	0	1+0	0	2+1	0	0+0	0
	DF	(Australia) AUS	Michael Thwaite	4	0	1+0	0	0+0	0	3+0	0
	DF	(Australia) AUS	Luke Wilkshire	7	1	3+0	0	4+0	1	0+0	0
	DF	(Australia) AUS	Rhys Williams	1	0	1+0	0	0+0	0	0+0	0
	MF	(Australia) AUS	Terry Antonis	3	0	0+0	0	0+0	0	1+2	0
	MF	(Australia) AUS	Mark Bresciano	7	1	3+0	1	4+0	0	0+0	0
	MF	(Australia) AUS	Tim Cahill	5	2	1+1	1	3+0	1	0+0	0
	MF	(Australia) AUS	Nick Carle	1	0	0+0	0	0+1	0	0+0	0
	MF	(Australia) AUS	Brett Emerton	4	2	0+0	0	1+0	1	3+0	1
	MF	(Australia) AUS	Richard Garcia	4	2	0+0	0	0+0	0	3+1	2
	MF	(Australia) AUS	James Holland	3	0	1+1	0	0+1	0	0+0	0
	MF	(Australia) AUS	Brett Holman	3	0	1+0	0	2+0	0	0+0	0
	MF	(Australia) AUS	Mile Jedinak	5	0	1+2	0	1+1	0	0+0	0
	MF	(Australia) AUS	Harry Kewell	3	1	1+0	0	2+0	1	0+0	0
	MF	(Australia) AUS	Neil Kilkenny	1	0	0+1	0	0+0	0	0+0	0
	MF	(Australia) AUS	Matt McKay	10	1	2+0	1	4+0	0	3+1	0
	MF	(Australia) AUS	Aaron Mooy	2	2	0+0	0	0+0	0	2+0	2
	MF	(Australia) AUS	Tommy Oar	2	0	1+0	0	0+1	0	0+0	0
	MF	(Australia) AUS	Tom Rogić	4	0	0+1	0	0+0	0	1+2	0
	MF	(Australia) AUS	Nikita Rukavytsya	3	1	2+0	1	0+1	0	0+0	0
	MF	(Australia) AUS	James Troisi	1	0	0+0	0	1+0	0	0+0	0
	MF	(Australia) AUS	Carl Valeri	5	0	2+0	0	3+0	0	0+0	0
	MF	(Australia) AUS	Adam Sarota	1	0	0+1	0	0+0	0	0+0	0
	FW	(Australia) AUS	Eli Babalj	1	2	0+0	0	0+0	0	1+0	2
	FW	(Australia) AUS	Alex Brosque	9	2	4+0	0	5+0	2	0+0	0
	FW	(Australia) AUS	Robbie Kruse	7	0	2+1	0	2+2	0	0+0	0
	FW	(Australia) AUS	Mathew Leckie	1	0	0+1	0	0+0	0	0+0	0
	FW	(Australia) AUS	Scott McDonald	1	0	0+1	0	0+0	0	0+0	0
	FW	(Australia) AUS	Adam Taggart	3	2	0+0	0	0+0	0	1+2	2
	FW	(Australia) AUS	Archie Thompson	12	7	2+2	1	0+4	2	2+2	4

=== Goal scorers ===
Correct as of 9 December 2015 (v. Chinese Taipei).

Place	Position	Name	Friendlies	World Cup Qualifiers	East Asian Cup	Total
1	FW	Archie Thompson	1	2	4	7
2	FW	Alex Brosque	0	2	0	2
2	MF	Tim Cahill	1	1	0	2
2	MF	Brett Emerton	0	1	1	2
2	FW	Eli Babalj	0	0	2	2
2	DF	Aziz Behich	0	0	2	2
2	FW	Adam Taggart	0	0	2	2
2	DF	Robert Cornthwaite	1	0	1	2
2	MF	Richard Garcia	0	0	2	2
2	MF	Aaron Mooy	0	0	2	2
11	MF	Harry Kewell	0	1	0	1
11	DF	Luke Wilkshire	0	1	0	1
11	MF	Mark Bresciano	1	0	0	1
11	MF	Matt McKay	1	0	0	1
11	MF	Nikita Rukavytsya	1	0	0	1
11	DF	Michael Marrone	0	0	1	1
11	MF	Mark Milligan	0	0	1	1
11		own goal	0	0	1	1
		TOTALS	6	8	19	33

=== Disciplinary record ===
Position	Name	Friendlies		World Cup Qualifiers		East Asian Cup		Total	
Position	Name	Yellow card	Red card	Yellow card	Red card	Yellow card	Red card	Yellow card	Red card
DF	Aziz Behich	0	0	0	0	1	0	1	0
DF	Ivan Franjic	0	0	0	0	1	0	1	0
DF	Mark Milligan	0	0	2	1	1	0	3	1
DF	Lucas Neill	0	0	1	0	0	0	1	0
DF	Saša Ognenovski	0	0	1	0	0	0	1	0
DF	Matthew Špiranović	1	0	0	0	0	0	1	0
DF	Michael Thwaite	0	0	0	0	1	0	1	0
DF	Luke Wilkshire	0	0	1	0	0	0	1	0
MF	Brett Emerton	0	0	0	0	1	0	1	0
MF	James Holland	1	0	0	0	0	0	1	0
MF	Terry Antonis	0	0	1	0	0	0	1	0
MF	Tom Rogić	0	0	0	0	1	0	1	0
MF	Carl Valeri	0	0	0	0	1	0	1	0
FW	Robbie Kruse	1	0	0	0	0	0	1	0
	TOTALS	3	0	6	1	7	0	16	1
