= 2013 Australia national soccer team season =

Australia
2013 season
- Chairmen: Frank Lowy
- Manager: Holger Osieck; Ange Postecoglou
Home colours	Away colours

This page summarises the Australia national soccer team fixtures and results in 2013.

== Summary ==
The team played their final four World Cup qualification matches. The two draws and two victories placed Australia second in the group to qualify for their fourth World Cup and the third in succession.

Australia then participated in the East Asian Cup for the first time. Due to the timing of the event Australia's first choice players were not available so a largely A-League based squad was used.

The team played a number of friendly matches towards the end of the year however successive 6–0 defeats resulted in coach Holger Osieck losing his job. He was replaced by Ange Postecoglou.

== Record ==
Type	GP	W	D	L	GF	GA
Friendly	5	2	0	3	6	15
World Cup qualifiers	4	2	2	0	8	3
East Asian Cup	3	0	1	2	5	7
Total	12	4	3	5	19	25

== Match results ==
=== Friendlies ===
6 February 2013	Australia	2–3	Romania	Marbella, Spain
07:00 UTC+11	Wilkshire 44' (pen.); Cornthwaite 53'	Summary; Report	Tănase 34'; Torje 79'; Stancu 83'	Stadium: Estadio Municipal de Marbella; Attendance: 1,000; Referee: Carlos Velasco Carballo (Spain)

8 September 2013	Brazil	6–0	Australia	Brasília, Brazil
05:15 AEST	Jô 8', 34'; Neymar 36'; Ramires 58'; Pato 73'; Luiz Gustavo 84'	Summary; Report		Stadium: Estádio Nacional Mané Garrincha; Attendance: 40,996; Referee: Enrique Cáceres (Paraguay)

12 October 2013	France	6–0	Australia	Paris, France
	Franck Ribéry 8' (pen.); Olivier Giroud 16', 27'; Yohan Cabaye 29'; Mathieu Debuchy 47'; Karim Benzema 51'	Summary; Report		Stadium: Parc des Princes; Attendance: 30,000; Referee: Artur Soares Dias (Portugal)

16 October 2013	Australia	3–0	Canada	London, England
	Kennedy 1'; Vidošić 52'; Leckie 79'	Summary; Report		Stadium: Craven Cottage; Attendance: 3,741; Referee: Michael Dean (England)

19 November 2013	Australia	1–0	Costa Rica	Sydney, Australia
19:30 AEDT	Cahill 69'	Summary; Report		Stadium: Sydney Football Stadium; Attendance: 20,165; Referee: Hiroyoshi Takayama (Japan)

=== World Cup qualifiers ===
26 March 2013 Fourth Round	Australia	2–2	Oman	Sydney, Australia
20:00 UTC+10	Cahill 52'; Holman 85'	Report	Al-Muqbali 7'; Jedinak 49' (o.g.)	Stadium: Stadium Australia; Attendance: 34,603; Referee: Ravshan Irmatov (Uzbekistan)

4 June 2013 Fourth Round	Japan	1–1	Australia	Saitama, Japan
20:30 UTC+10	Honda 90+1' (pen.)	Report	Oar 82'	Stadium: Saitama Stadium; Attendance: 62,172; Referee: Nawaf Shukralla (Bahrain)

11 June 2013 Fourth Round	Australia	4–0	Jordan	Melbourne, Australia
19:00 UTC+10	Bresciano 15'; Cahill 61'; Kruse 76'; Neill 84'	Report		Stadium: Docklands Stadium; Attendance: 43,785; Referee: Abdul Malik Abdul Bashir (Singapore)

18 June 2013 Fourth Round	Australia	1–0	Iraq	Sydney, Australia
22:15 UTC+8	Kennedy 83'	Report		Stadium: Stadium Australia; Attendance: 80,523; Referee: Alireza Faghani (Iran)

=== East Asian Cup ===
20 July 2013 Match 1	South Korea	0–0	Australia	Seoul, South Korea
19:00 UTC+9		Report		Stadium: Seoul World Cup Stadium; Attendance: 31,571; Referee: Yuichi Nishimura (Japan)

25 July 2013 Match 2	Japan	3–2	Australia	Hwaseong, South Korea
20:00 UTC+9	Saito 26'; Osako 56' 79'	Report	Duke 76'; Juric 78'	Stadium: Hwaseong Stadium; Attendance: 1,458; Referee: Tan Hai (China)

28 July 2013 Match 3	Australia	3–4	China	Seoul, South Korea
17:15 UTC+9	Mooy 30'; Taggart 89'; Duke 90+3'	Report	Yu Dabao 5'; Sun Ke 56'; Yang Xu 87'; Wu Lei 88'	Stadium: Olympic Stadium; Attendance: 10,526; Referee: Kim Dong-Jin (Korea Republic)

== Player statistics ==
No.	Pos	Nat	Player	Total		Friendlies		World Cup Qualifiers		East Asian Cup	
No.	Pos	Nat	Player	Apps	Goals	Apps	Goals	Apps	Goals	Apps	Goals
	GK	(Australia) AUS	Mark Birighitti	1	0	0+0	0	0+0	0	1+0	0
	GK	(Australia) AUS	Adam Federici	1	0	0+1	0	0+0	0	0+0	0
	GK	(Australia) AUS	Eugene Galekovic	2	0	0+0	0	0+0	0	2+0	0
	GK	(Australia) AUS	Mitchell Langerak	2	0	2+0	0	0+0	0	0+0	0
	GK	(Australia) AUS	Mathew Ryan	2	0	1+1	0	0+0	0	0+0	0
	GK	(Australia) AUS	Mark Schwarzer	6	0	2+0	0	4+0	0	0+0	0
	DF	(Australia) AUS	Joshua Brillante	1	0	0+0	0	0+0	0	1+0	0
	DF	(Australia) AUS	David Carney	2	0	2+0	0	0+0	0	0+0	0
	DF	(Australia) AUS	Robert Cornthwaite	3	1	1+0	1	1+0	0	1+0	0
	DF	(Australia) AUS	Jason Davidson	3	0	2+1	0	0+0	0	0+0	0
	DF	(Australia) AUS	Ivan Franjic	3	0	1+0	0	0+0	0	2+0	0
	DF	(Australia) AUS	Ryan McGowan	6	0	1+2	0	0+0	0	3+0	0
	DF	(Australia) AUS	Lucas Neill	8	1	5+0	0	3+0	1	0+0	0
	DF	(Australia) AUS	Jade North	2	0	0+0	0	0+0	0	2+0	0
	DF	(Australia) AUS	Sasa Ognenovski	4	0	1+0	0	3+0	0	0+0	0
	DF	(Australia) AUS	Michael Thwaite	3	0	0+0	0	1+0	0	2+0	0
	DF	(Australia) AUS	Luke Wilkshire	6	1	2+0	1	4+0	0	0+0	0
	DF	(Australia) AUS	Rhys Williams	4	0	3+1	0	0+0	0	0+0	0
	DF	(Australia) AUS	Michael Zullo	1	0	1+0	0	0+0	0	0+0	0
	MF	(Australia) AUS	Mark Bresciano	9	1	5+0	0	3+1	1	0+0	0
	MF	(Australia) AUS	Oliver Bozanic	1	0	0+1	0	0+0	0	0+0	0
	MF	(Australia) AUS	Craig Goodwin	2	0	0+0	0	0+0	0	1+1	0
	MF	(Australia) AUS	James Holland	4	0	3+0	0	1+0	0	0+0	0
	MF	(Australia) AUS	Brett Holman	6	1	2+0	0	4+0	1	0+0	0
	MF	(Australia) AUS	Mile Jedinak	5	0	4+0	0	1+0	0	0+0	0
	MF	(Australia) AUS	Robbie Kruse	8	1	4+0	0	4+0	1	0+0	0
	MF	(Australia) AUS	Jackson Irvine	1	0	0+1	0	0+0	0	0+0	0
	MF	(Australia) AUS	Matt McKay	12	0	4+1	0	4+0	0	3+0	0
	MF	(Australia) AUS	Mark Milligan	8	0	1+2	0	3+0	0	2+0	0
	MF	(Australia) AUS	Aaron Mooy	1	1	0+0	0	0+0	0	1+0	1
	MF	(Australia) AUS	Mitch Nichols	3	0	0+0	0	0+0	0	1+2	0
	MF	(Australia) AUS	Tom Rogic	4	0	0+2	0	0+2	0	0+0	0
	MF	(Australia) AUS	Nikita Rukavytsya	3	0	0+3	0	0+0	0	0+0	0
	MF	(Australia) AUS	Tommy Oar	6	1	1+1	0	3+1	1	0+0	0
	MF	(Australia) AUS	Erik Paartalu	2	0	0+0	0	0+0	0	1+1	0
	MF	(Australia) AUS	Archie Thompson	8	0	0+1	0	0+4	0	2+1	0
	MF	(Australia) AUS	Dario Vidosic	4	1	2+0	1	0+2	0	0+0	0
	MF	(Australia) AUS	Ruben Zadkovich	2	0	0+0	0	0+0	0	2+0	0
	FW	(Australia) AUS	Alex Brosque	2	0	1+0	0	1+0	0	0+0	0
	FW	(Australia) AUS	Mitchell Duke	4	2	0+1	0	0+0	0	3+0	2
	FW	(Australia) AUS	Tim Cahill	6	3	1+1	1	4+0	2	0+0	0
	FW	(Australia) AUS	Tomi Juric	3	1	0+0	0	0+0	0	1+2	1
	FW	(Australia) AUS	Joshua Kennedy	5	2	2+2	1	0+1	1	0+0	0
	FW	(Australia) AUS	Mathew Leckie	4	1	1+3	1	0+0	0	0+0	0
	FW	(Australia) AUS	Connor Pain	1	0	0+0	0	0+0	0	0+1	0
	FW	(Australia) AUS	Adam Taggart	1	1	0+0	0	0+0	0	0+1	1
