= 2011 Australia national soccer team season =

Australia
2011 season
- Chairmen: Frank Lowy
- Manager: Holger Osieck
Home colours	Away colours

The page summarises the Australia national soccer team fixtures and results in 2011.

== Summary ==
Australia competed in the Asian Cup for the second time and improved on their previous effort by making the final. An extra-time goal by Japan meant Australia were to finish in the runner-up position. The middle of the year was most made up of friendlies, the most notable of which saw Australia come from behind to defeat Germany. Qualifiers for the 2014 FIFA World Cup filled out the year and despite a slip up in Muscat, Australia were well on their way to the fourth round with four wins from five matches. Australia peaked at 19 on the FIFA rankings during 2011.

== Record ==
Type	GP	W	D	L	GF	GA
Friendly matches	6	4	2	0	12	2
Asian Cup	6	4	1	1	13	2
World Cup qualifiers	5	4	0	1	9	3
Total	17	12	3	2	34	7

== Match results ==
=== Friendlies ===
5 January 2011	United Arab Emirates	0–0	Australia	Al Ain, United Arab Emirates
18:30 UTC+4				Stadium: Sheikh Khalifa International Stadium; Referee: Ali Shaban (Kuwait)

29 March 2011	Germany	1–2	Australia	Mönchengladbach, Germany
20:45 UTC+2	Gómez 26'		Carney 61'; Wilkshire 64' (pen.)	Stadium: Borussia-Park; Attendance: 30,152; Referee: Stéphane Lannoy (France)

5 June 2011	Australia	3–0	New Zealand	Adelaide, Australia
17:00 UTC+9:30	Kennedy 10', 59'; Troisi 93' (pen.)			Stadium: Adelaide Oval; Attendance: 21,281; Referee: Minoru Tōjō (Japan)

7 June 2011	Australia	0–0	Serbia	Melbourne, Australia
19:30 UTC+10		Report		Stadium: Etihad Stadium; Attendance: 28,149; Referee: Minoru Tōjō (Japan)

10 August 2011	Wales	1–2	Australia	Cardiff, Wales
19:45 UTC+1	Blake 82'	Report	Cahill 44'; Kruse 60'	Stadium: Cardiff City Stadium; Attendance: 7,500; Referee: Kristo Tohver (Estonia)

7 October 2011	Australia	5–0	Malaysia	Canberra, Australia
19:00	Wilkshire 3'; Kennedy 33', 45+1'; Brosque 39', 69'	Report		Stadium: Canberra Stadium; Attendance: 10,041; Referee: Paul Cetrangolo (Australia)

=== Asian Cup ===
10 January 2011 Group Stage	India	0–4	Australia	Doha, Qatar
16:15 UTC+3		(Report)	Cahill 11', 65'; Kewell 24'; Holman 45+1'	Stadium: Jassim Bin Hamad Stadium; Attendance: 11,749; Referee: Ali Al Badwawi (United Arab Emirates)

14 January 2011 Group Stage	Australia	1–1	South Korea	Doha, Qatar
16:15 UTC+3	Jedinak 62'	(Report)	Koo Ja-Cheol 24'	Stadium: Al-Gharafa Stadium; Attendance: 15,526; Referee: Abdulrahman Abdou (Qatar)

18 January 2011 Group Stage	Australia	1–0	Bahrain	Doha, Qatar
16:15 UTC+3	Jedinak 37'	(Report)		Stadium: Jassim Bin Hamad Stadium; Referee: Yuichi Nishimura (Japan)

22 January 2011 Quarter-finals	Australia	1–0 (a.e.t.)	Iraq	Doha, Qatar
16:25 UTC+3	Kewell 117'	(Report)		Stadium: Jassim Bin Hamad Stadium; Attendance: 7,889; Referee: Abdulrahman Abdou (Qatar)

25 January 2011 Semi-finals	Uzbekistan	0–6	Australia	Doha, Qatar
19:25 UTC+3	Bakayev (yellow card) 56' (red card) 67'	(Report)	Kewell 5'; Ognenovski 35'; Carney 65'; Emerton 74'; Valeri 82'; Kruse 83'	Stadium: Khalifa International Stadium; Attendance: 24,826; Referee: Ali Al Badwawi (United Arab Emirates)

29 January 2011 Final	Australia	0–1 (a.e.t.)	Japan	Doha, Qatar
18:00 UTC+3		Report	Lee 109'	Stadium: Khalifa International Stadium, Doha; Attendance: 37,174; Referee: Ravshan Irmatov (Uzbekistan)

=== World Cup qualifiers ===
2 September 2011 Third Round	Australia	2–1	Thailand	Brisbane, Australia
20:00 UTC+10	Kennedy 57'; Brosque 86'	Report; Summary	Dangda 15'	Stadium: Suncorp Stadium; Attendance: 24,540; Referee: Abdullah Dor Mohammed Balideh (Qatar)

6 September 2011 Third Round	Saudi Arabia	1–3	Australia	Dammam, Saudi Arabia
20:30 UTC+3	Al-Shamrani 65'	Report	Kennedy 40', 56'; Wilkshire 77' (pen.)	Stadium: Prince Mohamed bin Fahd Stadium; Attendance: 15,000; Referee: Yuichi Nishimura (Japan)

11 October 2011 Third Round	Australia	3–0	Oman	Sydney, Australia
19:30	Holman 7'; Kennedy 65'; Jednak 85'	Summary		Stadium: ANZ Stadium; Attendance: 24,732; Referee: Valentin Kovalenko (Uzbekistan)

11 November 2011 Third Round	Oman	1–0	Australia	Muscat, Oman
18.00 UTC+4	Hosni 18'	Report		Stadium: Sultan Qaboos Sports Complex; Attendance: 4,500; Referee: Ali Abdulnabi (Bahrain)

15 November 2011 Third Round	Thailand	0–1	Australia	Bangkok, Thailand
18:00 UTC+7		Report	Holman 78'	Stadium: Rajamangala Stadium; Attendance: 19,400; Referee: Saeid Mozaffarizadeh (Iran)

== Goal scorers ==
Player	Goals
Kennedy	8
Brosque	3
Cahill	3
Jedinak	3
Kewell	3
Wilkshire	3
Carney	2
Holman	2
Kruse	2
Emerton	1
Ognenovski	1
Troisi	1
Valeri	1
