= 2014 Australia national soccer team season =

Australia
2014 season
- Chairman: Frank Lowy
- Manager: Ange Postecoglou
Home colours	Away colours

This page summarises the Australia national soccer team fixtures and results in 2014.

== Summary ==
In their first full year under new coach Ange Postecoglou, the national team managed only one victory from eleven matches. The bulk of the matches were friendlies and included a 4–3 loss to Ecuador despite leading 3–0. Australia participated in the 2014 FIFA World Cup and were unable to proceed beyond the group stage after losing all three games.

== Record ==
Type	GP	W	D	L	GF	GA
Friendly	8	1	2	5	8	13
FIFA World Cup	3	0	0	3	3	9
Total	11	1	2	8	11	22

== Match results ==
=== Friendlies ===
5 March 2014	Australia	3–4	Ecuador	London, England
20:00	Cahill 8', 31'; Jedinak 15' (pen.); Langerak (red card) 58'	Summary; Report	Martínez 56'; Castillo 60' (pen.); E.Valencia 76'; Méndez 90+1'	Stadium: The Den; Attendance: 7,133; Referee: Lee Probert (England)

26 May 2014	Australia	1–1	South Africa	Sydney, Australia
19:30	Cahill 14'	Summary; Report	Patosi 13'	Stadium: ANZ Stadium; Attendance: 50,468; Referee: Kim Jong-hyeok (South Korea)

6 June 2014	Australia	0–1	Croatia	Salvador, Brazil
		Summary; Report	Jelavić 58'	Stadium: Estádio de Pituaçu; Referee: Francisco Carlos do Nascimento (Brazil)

4 September 2014	Belgium	2–0	Australia	Liège, Belgium
20:45 (UTC+2)	Mertens 18'; Witsel 77'	Report		Stadium: Stade Maurice Dufrasne; Attendance: 16,850; Referee: Michael Oliver (England)

8 September 2014	Saudi Arabia	2–3	Australia	London, United Kingdom
20:00 (UTC+1)	Fallatah 71' (pen.); Al-Jassim 84'	Report	Cahill 3'; Jedinak 6'; Wright 77'	Stadium: Craven Cottage; Attendance: 3,677; Referee: Martin Atkinson (England)

10 October 2014	United Arab Emirates	0–0	Australia	Abu Dhabi, United Arab Emirates
18:30 (UTC+4)		Report		Stadium: Mohammed Bin Zayed Stadium; Referee: Vladislav Tseytlin (Uzbekistan)

14 October 2014	Qatar	1–0	Australia	Doha, Qatar
19:30 (UTC+3)	Ibrahim 61'	Report		Stadium: Abdullah bin Khalifa Stadium

18 November 2014 Kirin Challenge Cup	Japan	2–1	Australia	Osaka, Japan
	Konno 61'; Okazaki 68'	Report	Cahill 90+2'	Stadium: Nagai Stadium; Referee: Paweł Gil (Poland)

=== FIFA World Cup ===
13 June 2014 Group Stage	Chile	3–1	Australia	Cuiabá, Brazil
19:00	Sánchez 12'; Valdivia 14'; Beausejour 90+2'	Summary; Report	Cahill 35'	Stadium: Arena Pantanal; Attendance: 40,275; Referee: Noumandiez Doué (Ivory Coast)

18 June 2014 Group Stage	Australia	2–3	Netherlands	Porto Alegre, Brazil
13:00	Cahill 21'; Jedinak 54' (pen.)	Summary; Report	Robben 20' van Persie 58'; Memphis 68'	Stadium: Estádio Beira-Rio; Attendance: 42,877; Referee: Djamel Haimoudi (Algeria)

23 June 2014 Group Stage	Australia	0–3	Spain	Curitiba, Brazil
13:00		Summary; Report	Villa 36'; Torres 69'; Mata 82'	Stadium: Arena da Baixada; Attendance: 39,375; Referee: Nawaf Shukralla (Bahrain)

== Player statistics ==
Correct as of 18 November 2014 (v. Japan).
Numbers are listed by player's number in FIFA World Cup or last friendly played

No.	Pos	Nat	Player	Total		Friendlies		World Cup	
No.	Pos	Nat	Player	Apps	Goals	Apps	Goals	Apps	Goals
1	GK	(Australia) AUS	Mathew Ryan	9	0	6+0	0	3+0	0
12	GK	(Australia) AUS	Mitchell Langerak	3	0	2+1	0	0+0	0
18	GK	(Australia) AUS	Brad Jones	1	0	0+1	0	0+0	0
18	GK	(Australia) AUS	Adam Federici	1	0	0+1	0	0+0	0
2	DF	(Australia) AUS	Ivan Franjic	6	0	4+1	0	1+0	0
3	DF	(Australia) AUS	Jason Davidson	9	0	6+0	0	3+0	0
6	DF	(Australia) AUS	Matthew Spiranovic	5	0	2+0	0	3+0	0
6	DF	(Australia) AUS	Nikolai Topor-Stanley	1	0	1+0	0	0+0	0
8	DF	(Australia) AUS	Bailey Wright	1	1	1+0	1	0+0	0
8	DF	(Australia) AUS	Luke Wilkshire	1	0	0+1	0	0+0	0
13	DF	(Australia) AUS	Aziz Behich	3	0	2+1	0	0+0	0
17	DF	(Australia) AUS	Brad Smith	4	0	0+4	0	0+0	0
19	DF	(Australia) AUS	Ryan McGowan	4	0	1+0	0	2+1	0
20	DF	(Australia) AUS	Trent Sainsbury	4	0	3+1	0	0+0	0
22	DF	(Australia) AUS	Alex Wilkinson	11	0	7+1	0	3+0	0
22	DF	(Australia) AUS	Curtis Good	1	0	1+0	0	0+0	0
25	DF	(Australia) AUS	Chris Herd	3	0	3+0	0	0+0	0
5	MF	(Australia) AUS	Mark Milligan	7	0	5+1	0	1+0	0
8	MF	(Australia) AUS	Joshua Brillante	4	0	2+2	0	0+0	0
9	MF	(Australia) AUS	Mitch Nichols	1	0	0+1	0	0+0	0
10	MF	(Australia) AUS	Ben Halloran	6	0	0+3	0	0+3	0
11	MF	(Australia) AUS	Tommy Oar	9	0	6+0	0	3+0	0
13	MF	(Australia) AUS	Oliver Bozanic	4	0	0+2	0	1+1	0
14	MF	(Australia) AUS	James Troisi	7	0	3+2	0	0+2	0
15	MF	(Australia) AUS	Mile Jedinak	10	3	7+0	2	3+0	1
16	MF	(Australia) AUS	James Holland	3	0	1+2	0	0+0	0
16	MF	(Australia) AUS	Carl Valeri	2	0	0+2	0	0+0	0
17	MF	(Australia) AUS	Matt McKay	5	0	1+2	0	2+0	0
20	MF	(Australia) AUS	Dario Vidošić	3	0	1+2	0	0+0	0
20	MF	(Australia) AUS	Tom Rogić	1	0	1+0	0	0+0	0
21	MF	(Australia) AUS	Massimo Luongo	5	0	3+2	0	0+0	0
23	MF	(Australia) AUS	Mark Bresciano	8	0	2+3	0	2+1	0
24	MF	(Australia) AUS	Aaron Mooy	1	0	0+1	0	0+0	0
4	FW	(Australia) AUS	Tim Cahill	10	7	6+2	5	2+0	2
7	FW	(Australia) AUS	Mathew Leckie	11	0	7+1	0	3+0	0
9	FW	(Australia) AUS	Tomi Juric	2	0	0+2	0	0+0	0
9	FW	(Australia) AUS	Adam Taggart	3	0	0+1	0	1+1	0
9	FW	(Australia) AUS	Joshua Kennedy	1	0	0+1	0	0+0	0
10	FW	(Australia) AUS	Robbie Kruse	3	0	3+0	0	0+0	0
19	FW	(Australia) AUS	Bernie Ibini	2	0	1+1	0	0+0	0
