= 2016 Australia national soccer team season =

Australia
2016 season
- Chairman: Steven Lowy
- Manager: Ange Postecoglou
| Home colours | Away colours |

This page summarises the Australia national soccer team fixtures and results in 2016.

== Summary ==
Australia started the year by progressing to the next stage of World Cup qualification after winning the final two qualification matches. By the end of the year Australia had played five of their ten Third Round qualifiers. After winning the first two, they drew the next three leaving them third in a group of six with just one point separating the top four.

== Record ==
| Type | GP | W | D | L | GF | GA |
|---|---|---|---|---|---|---|
| Friendly | 3 | 1 | 0 | 2 | 3 | 4 |
| World Cup & Asian Cup qualifiers | 2 | 2 | 0 | 0 | 12 | 1 |
| World Cup qualifiers – Third Round | 5 | 2 | 3 | 0 | 8 | 5 |
| Total | 10 | 5 | 3 | 2 | 23 | 10 |

== Match results ==
=== Friendlies ===
| 27 May 2016 | England | 2–1 | Australia | Sunderland, England |
| 20:00 BST | Rashford 3'; Rooney 55' | Report | Dier 75' (o.g.) | Stadium: Stadium of Light; Attendance: 46,595; Referee: Danny Makkelie (Netherlands) |

| 4 June 2016 Dodoni Series | Australia | 1–0 | Greece | Sydney, Australia |
| 20:00 AEST | Leckie 90+3' | Report | | Stadium: ANZ Stadium; Attendance: 38,682; Referee: Jumpei Iida (Japan) |

| 7 June 2016 Dodoni Series | Australia | 1–2 | Greece | Melbourne, Australia |
| 20:00 AEST | Sainsbury 58' | Report | Mantalos 8'; Maniatis 20' | Stadium: Etihad Stadium; Attendance: 33,622; Referee: Bobby Madley (England) |

=== Joint World Cup and Asian Cup qualifiers ===
| 24 March 2016 Group B | Australia | 7–0 | Tajikistan | Adelaide, Australia |
| 19:30 ACDT (UTC+10:30) | Luongo 2'; Jedinak 13' (pen.); Milligan 57' (pen.); Burns 67', 87'; Rogic 70', 72' | Report; Report (AFC) | | Stadium: Adelaide Oval; Attendance: 35,439; Referee: Fahad Al-Marri (Qatar) |

| 29 March 2016 Group B | Australia | 5–1 | Jordan | Sydney, Australia |
| 20:00 UTC+11 | Cahill 24', 44'; Mooy 39'; Rogic 53'; Luongo 69' | Report; Report (AFC) | Deeb 90' | Stadium: Allianz Stadium; Attendance: 24,975; Referee: Kim Jong-hyeok (South Korea) |

=== World Cup qualifiers – Third Round ===
| 1 September 2016 Group B | Australia | 2–0 | Iraq | Perth, Australia |
| 18:30 UTC+8 | Luongo 58'; Juric 65' | Report; Report (FIFA); Report (AFC) | | Stadium: Perth Oval; Attendance: 18,923; Referee: Alireza Faghani (Iran) |

| 6 September 2016 Group B | United Arab Emirates | 0–1 | Australia | Abu Dhabi, United Arab Emirates |
| 19:30 UTC+4 | | Report; Report (FIFA); Report (AFC) | Cahill 75' | Stadium: Mohammed Bin Zayed Stadium; Attendance: 40,893; Referee: Mohd Amirul Izwan Yaacob (Malaysia) |

| 6 October 2016 Group B | Saudi Arabia | 2–2 | Australia | Jeddah, Saudi Arabia |
| 20:45 UTC+3 | Al-Jassim 5'; Al-Shamrani 79' | Report; Report (FIFA); Report (AFC) | Sainsbury 45'; Juric 71' | Stadium: King Abdullah Sports City; Attendance: 51,616; Referee: Ravshan Irmatov (Uzbekistan) |

| 11 October 2016 Group B | Australia | 1–1 | Japan | Melbourne, Australia |
| 20:00 UTC+11 | Jedinak 52' (pen.) | Report; Report (FIFA); Report (AFC) | Haraguchi 5' | Stadium: Docklands Stadium; Attendance: 48,460; Referee: Nawaf Shukralla (Bahrain) |

| 15 November 2016 Group B | Thailand | 2–2 | Australia | Bangkok, Thailand |
| 19:00 UTC+7 | Teerasil 20', 57' (pen.) | Report; Report (FIFA); Report (AFC) | Jedinak 9' (pen.), 65' (pen.) | Stadium: Rajamangala Stadium; Attendance: 36,534; Referee: Fahad Al-Marri (Qatar) |

== Player statistics ==
Correct as of 15 November 2016 (v. Thailand).
Numbers are listed by player's number in WC&AFC Qualification or last friendly played

| No. | Pos | Nat | Player | Total | | Friendlies | | World Cup Qualifiers | |
| No. | Pos | Nat | Player | Apps | Goals | Apps | Goals | Apps | Goals |
|---|---|---|---|---|---|---|---|---|---|
| 1 | GK | (Australia) AUS | Mathew Ryan | 9 | 0 | 2+0 | 0 | 7+0 | 0 |
| 18 | GK | (Australia) AUS | Adam Federici | 1 | 0 | 1+0 | 0 | 0+0 | 0 |
| 2 | DF | (Australia) AUS | Jason Geria | 1 | 0 | 1+0 | 0 | 0+0 | 0 |
| 2 | DF | (Australia) AUS | Milos Degenek | 5 | 0 | 1+2 | 0 | 2+0 | 0 |
| 3 | DF | (Australia) AUS | Alex Gersbach | 2 | 0 | 1+1 | 0 | 0+0 | 0 |
| 6 | DF | (Australia) AUS | Matthew Spiranovic | 4 | 0 | 0+0 | 0 | 4+0 | 0 |
| 8 | DF | (Australia) AUS | Bailey Wright | 4 | 0 | 2+0 | 0 | 2+0 | 0 |
| 14 | DF | (Australia) AUS | Brad Smith | 10 | 0 | 2+1 | 0 | 7+0 | 0 |
| 17 | DF | (Australia) AUS | Josh Risdon | 2 | 0 | 1+0 | 0 | 1+0 | 0 |
| 19 | DF | (Australia) AUS | Ryan McGowan | 4 | 0 | 1+0 | 0 | 3+0 | 0 |
| 20 | DF | (Australia) AUS | Trent Sainsbury | 9 | 2 | 2+0 | 1 | 7+0 | 1 |
| 5 | MF | (Australia) AUS | Mark Milligan | 9 | 1 | 3+0 | 0 | 4+2 | 1 |
| 11 | MF | (Australia) AUS | Chris Ikonomidis | 4 | 0 | 0+3 | 0 | 0+1 | 0 |
| 11 | MF | (Australia) AUS | Craig Goodwin | 1 | 0 | 0+1 | 0 | 0+0 | 0 |
| 13 | MF | (Australia) AUS | Aaron Mooy | 10 | 1 | 3+0 | 0 | 7+0 | 1 |
| 15 | MF | (Australia) AUS | Mile Jedinak | 7 | 4 | 2+0 | 0 | 5+0 | 4 |
| 17 | MF | (Australia) AUS | Matt McKay | 1 | 0 | 0+1 | 0 | 0+0 | 0 |
| 21 | MF | (Australia) AUS | Massimo Luongo | 7 | 3 | 1+0 | 0 | 3+3 | 3 |
| 22 | MF | (Australia) AUS | Jackson Irvine | 5 | 0 | 0+2 | 0 | 0+3 | 0 |
| 23 | MF | (Australia) AUS | Tom Rogic | 10 | 3 | 2+1 | 0 | 6+1 | 3 |
| 4 | FW | (Australia) AUS | Tim Cahill | 6 | 3 | 1+1 | 0 | 1+3 | 3 |
| 4 | FW | (Australia) AUS | Jamie Maclaren | 2 | 0 | 1+0 | 0 | 1+0 | 0 |
| 7 | FW | (Australia) AUS | Mathew Leckie | 9 | 1 | 1+1 | 1 | 6+1 | 0 |
| 9 | FW | (Australia) AUS | Tomi Juric | 5 | 2 | 0+1 | 0 | 4+0 | 2 |
| 9 | FW | (Australia) AUS | Apostolos Giannou | 5 | 0 | 1+1 | 0 | 2+1 | 0 |
| 10 | FW | (Australia) AUS | Robbie Kruse | 10 | 0 | 3+0 | 0 | 4+3 | 0 |
| 16 | FW | (Australia) AUS | Nathan Burns | 6 | 2 | 1+1 | 0 | 1+3 | 2 |
