= 2010 Australia national soccer team season =

Australia
2010 season
- Chairmen: Frank Lowy
- Manager: Pim Verbeek
Home colours	Away colours

This page summarises the Australia national soccer team fixtures and results in 2010.

== Summary ==
The year started with Australia's final two qualification matches for the 2011 AFC Asian Cup. Qualification was sealed by topping the group. Australia won four of eight friendlies during the year however the main event was the 2010 World Cup. With a win, draw and a loss, Australia failed to progress from the group stage on goal difference.

== Record ==
Type	GP	W	D	L	GF	GA
Friendly	8	4	1	3	7	10
World Cup	3	1	1	1	3	6
Asian Cup qualification	2	1	1	0	3	2
Total	13	6	3	4	13	18

== Match results ==
=== Friendlies ===
24 May 2010	Australia	2–1	New Zealand	Melbourne, Australia
	Vidošić 57'; Holman 90+4'	[ (Report)]	16' Killen	Stadium: MCG; Attendance: 55,659; Referee: Ricardo Salazar (United States)

1 June 2010	Australia	1–0	Denmark	Johannesburg, South Africa
	Kennedy 71'	[ (Report)]		Stadium: Ruimsig Stadium; Attendance: 6,000; Referee: Daniel Bennett (South Africa)

5 June 2010	United States	3–1	Australia	Johannesburg, South Africa
	Buddle 4', 31'; Gomez 90+3'	[ (Report)]	19' Cahill	Stadium: Ruimsig Stadium; Attendance: 6,000; Referee: Abdul Ebrahim (South Africa)

11 August 2010	Slovenia	2–0	Australia	Ljubljana, Slovenia
	Dedič 78'; Ljubijankič 90+1'	[ (Report)]		Stadium: Stožice Stadium; Attendance: 16,155; Referee: Paolo Tagliavento (Italy)

3 September 2010	Switzerland	0–0	Australia	St. Gallen, Switzerland
		[ (Report)]		Stadium: AFG Arena; Attendance: 14,660; Referee: Thomas Einwaller (Austria)

7 September 2010	Poland	1–2	Australia	Kraków, Poland
	Lewandowski 18'	[ (Report)]	13' Holman; 26' (pen.) Wilkshire	Stadium: Stadion Miejski in Kraków; Attendance: 17,000; Referee: Ivan Bebek (Croatia)

9 October 2010	Australia	1–0	Paraguay	Sydney, Australia
	Carney 53'	[ (Report)]		Stadium: Sydney Football Stadium; Attendance: 25,210; Referee: Yuichi Nishimura (Japan)

17 November 2010	Egypt	3–0	Australia	Cairo, Egypt
	El-Zaher 28'; Gedo 59'; Zidan 90' (pen.)	[ (Report)]		Stadium: Cairo International Stadium; Referee: Anton Genov (Bulgaria)

=== World Cup ===
13 June 2010 Group stage	Germany	4–0	Australia	Durban, South Africa
20:30 UTC+02:00	Podolski 8'; Klose 26'; Müller 67'; Cacau 70'	Report	Cahill (red card) 56'	Stadium: Moses Mabhida Stadium; Attendance: 62,660; Referee: Marco Antonio Rodríguez (Mexico)

19 June 2010 Group stage	Ghana	1–1	Australia	Rustenburg, South Africa
16:00 UTC+02:00	Gyan 25' (pen.)	Report	11' Holman; Kewell (red card) 24'	Stadium: Royal Bafokeng Stadium; Attendance: 34,812; Referee: Roberto Rosetti (Italy)

23 June 2010 Group stage	Australia	2–1	Serbia	Nelspruit, South Africa
20:30 UTC+02:00	Cahill 69'; Holman 73'	Report	84' Pantelić	Stadium: Mbombela Stadium; Attendance: 37,836; Referee: Jorge Larrionda (Uruguay)

=== Asian Cup qualification ===
6 January 2010 Group B	Kuwait	2–2	Australia	Kuwait City, Kuwait
17:30 UTC+03:00	Bandar 40'; Nasser 44'	[ (Report)]	3' Wilkshire; 5' Heffernan	Stadium: Al Kuwait Sports Club Stadium; Attendance: 20,000; Referee: Ravshan Irmatov (Uzbekistan)

3 March 2010 Group stage	Australia	1–0	Indonesia	Brisbane, Australia
19:00 UTC+10:00	Milligan 42'	[ (Report)]		Stadium: Suncorp Stadium; Attendance: 20,422; Referee: Kenji Ogiya (Japan)

== Goal scorers ==
Player	Goals
Brett Holman	4
Tim Cahill	2
Luke Wilkshire	2
David Carney	1
Dean Heffernan	1
Joshua Kennedy	1
Mark Milligan	1
Dario Vidošić	1
