= 2017 Australia national soccer team season =

Australia
2017 season
- Chairman: Steven Lowy
- Manager: Ange Postecoglou
Home colours	Away colours

This page summarises the Australia national soccer team fixtures and results in 2017.

== Summary ==
Australia continued qualification for the World Cup starting the second half of the fixtures in third position. Despite remaining undefeated with an away draw to Iraq and home wins over the United Arab Emirates and Saudi Arabia, by the middle of the year Australia hadn't improved from third, the position that sends a team into further qualification matches.

In June, following a loss in a home friendly against Brazil, the team travelled to Russia to compete in the 2017 FIFA Confederations Cup. Two draws and a loss resulted in Australia finishing third in the group and failing to progress any further.

World Cup qualification resumed later in the year and despite Australia sitting third in the group, an away win against Japan would have seen them qualify for the World Cup with a game to spare, however they lost the fixture 2–0. Despite winning the final game against Thailand, Australia finished third (due to Saudi Arabia having a better goal difference) and missed out on automatic qualification to the World Cup, and entered the AFC play-offs against Syria.

The first leg of the play-offs against Syria was played in Malacca, Malaysia, due to the Syrian Civil War. The match ended in a draw, with Australia taking the lead in the 1st half and Syria equalising in the 85th minute with a penalty. In the second leg, played in Sydney, Australia won 2–1 after extra-time thanks to a brace by Tim Cahill. With an aggregate score of 3–2, Australia qualified for the inter-confederation play-offs against Honduras (the 4th place team from CONCACAF).

The first leg of the inter-confederational play-offs was played in San Pedro Sula, Honduras and ended in a goalless draw. In the second leg at Stadium Australia in Sydney, captain Mile Jedinak scored a hat-trick leading Australia to a 3–1 victory and securing a berth at the 2018 FIFA World Cup.

On 22 November, after qualifying for the 2018 World Cup, coach Ange Postecoglou resigned from his position as coach of the team.

== Record ==
As of 15 November 2017

Type	GP	W	D	L	GF	GA
Friendly	1	0	0	1	0	4
World Cup qualifiers	9	5	3	1	14	9
Confederations Cup	3	0	2	1	4	5
Total	13	5	5	3	18	18

== Match results ==
=== Friendlies ===
13 June 2017	Australia	0–4	Brazil	Melbourne, Australia
20:05 UTC+10		Report	Souza 1', 90+3'; Silva 62'; Taison 75'	Stadium: Melbourne Cricket Ground; Attendance: 49,874; Referee: Mark Clattenburg (England)

=== World Cup qualifiers ===
23 March 2017 Group B	Iraq	1–1	Australia	Tehran, Iran
16:30 UTC+4:30	Yasin 76'	Report; Report (FIFA); Report (AFC)	Leckie 39'	Stadium: PAS Stadium; Attendance: 3,270; Referee: Kim Jong-hyeok (South Korea)

28 March 2017 Group B	Australia	2–0	United Arab Emirates	Sydney, Australia
20:00 UTC+11	Irvine 7'; Leckie 78'	Report; Report (FIFA); Report (AFC)		Stadium: Sydney Football Stadium; Attendance: 27,328; Referee: Ahmed Al-Kaf (Oman)

8 June 2017 Group B	Australia	3–2	Saudi Arabia	Adelaide, Australia
19:30 UTC+9:30	Juric 7', 36'; Rogic 64'	Report (FIFA); Report (AFC)	Al-Dawsari 23'; Al-Sahlawi 45+2'	Stadium: Adelaide Oval; Attendance: 29,785; Referee: Ravshan Irmatov (Uzbekistan)

31 August 2017 Group B	Japan	2–0	Australia	Saitama, Japan
19:35 UTC+9	Asano 41'; Ideguchi 82'	Report; Report (FIFA); Report (AFC)		Stadium: Saitama Stadium 2002; Attendance: 59,492; Referee: Alireza Faghani (Iran)

5 September 2017 Group B	Australia	2–1	Thailand	Melbourne, Australia
20:00 UTC+10	Juric 69'; Leckie 86'	Report; Report (FIFA); Report (AFC)	Pokklaw 82'	Stadium: Melbourne Rectangular Stadium; Attendance: 26,393; Referee: Liu Kwok Man (Hong Kong)

5 October 2017 Round 4	Syria	1–1	Australia	Malacca, Malaysia
20:30 UTC+8	Al Somah 85' (pen.)	Report; Report (FIFA); Report (AFC)	Kruse 40'	Stadium: Hang Jebat Stadium; Attendance: 2,150; Referee: Alireza Faghani (Iran)

10 October 2017 Round 4	Australia	2–1 (a.e.t.) (3–2 agg.)	Syria	Sydney, Australia
20:00 UTC+11	Cahill 13', 109'	Report; Report (FIFA); Report (AFC)	Al Somah 6'	Stadium: Stadium Australia; Attendance: 42,136; Referee: Ravshan Irmatov (Uzbekistan)

10 November 2017 IC PO	Honduras	0–0	Australia	San Pedro Sula, Honduras
16:00 UTC−6		Report; Report (FIFA)		Stadium: Estadio Olímpico Metropolitano; Attendance: 38,000; Referee: Daniele Orsato (Italy)

15 November 2017 IC PO	Australia	3–1 (3–1 agg.)	Honduras	Sydney, Australia
20:00 UTC+11	Jedinak 54', 72' (pen.), 86' (pen.)	Report; Report (FIFA)	M. Figueroa 90+3'	Stadium: Stadium Australia; Attendance: 77,060; Referee: Néstor Pitana (Argentina)

=== Confederations Cup ===
19 June 2017 Group stage	Australia	2–3	Germany	Sochi, Russia
18:00 UTC+3	Rogic 41'; Juric 56'	Report; Report (FIFA)	Stindl 5'; Draxler 44' (pen.); Goretzka 48'	Stadium: Fisht Olympic Stadium; Attendance: 28,605; Referee: Mark Geiger (United States)

22 June 2017 Group stage	Cameroon	1–1	Australia	Saint Petersburg, Russia
18:00 UTC+3	Zambo Anguissa 45+1'	Report; Report (FIFA)	Milligan 60' (pen.)	Stadium: Krestovsky Stadium; Attendance: 35,021; Referee: Milorad Mažić (Serbia)

25 June 2017 Group stage	Chile	1–1	Australia	Moscow, Russia
18:00 UTC+3	Rodríguez 67'	Report; Report (FIFA)	Troisi 42'	Stadium: Otkrytiye Arena; Attendance: 33,639; Referee: Gianluca Rocchi (Italy)

== Player statistics ==
Correct as of 15 November 2017 (v. Honduras).
Numbers are listed by player's number in Confederations Cup, WC Qualification or last friendly played

No.	Pos	Nat	Player	Total		Friendlies		World Cup Qualifiers		Confederations Cup	
No.	Pos	Nat	Player	Apps	Goals	Apps	Goals	Apps	Goals	Apps	Goals
1	GK	(Australia) AUS	Mathew Ryan	11	0	0+0	0	8+0	0	3+0	0
12	GK	(Australia) AUS	Mitchell Langerak	2	0	1+0	0	1+0	0	0+0	0
2	DF	(Australia) AUS	Milos Degenek	10	0	1+0	0	6+1	0	2+0	0
3	DF	(Australia) AUS	Brad Smith	5	0	0+0	0	4+1	0	0+0	0
6	DF	(Australia) AUS	Dylan McGowan	1	0	0+1	0	0+0	0	0+0	0
6	DF	(Australia) AUS	Matt Spiranovic	1	0	0+0	0	1+0	0	0+0	0
6	DF	(Australia) AUS	Matthew Jurman	4	0	0+0	0	4+0	0	0+0	0
8	DF	(Australia) AUS	Bailey Wright	9	0	1+0	0	5+0	0	2+1	0
16	DF	(Australia) AUS	Aziz Behich	7	0	1+0	0	3+1	0	2+0	0
16	DF	(Australia) AUS	Alex Gersbach	2	0	0+0	0	1+0	0	1+0	0
19	DF	(Australia) AUS	Ryan McGowan	2	0	0+0	0	1+0	0	1+0	0
19	DF	(Australia) AUS	Josh Risdon	2	0	0+0	0	2+0	0	0+0	0
20	DF	(Australia) AUS	Trent Sainsbury	12	0	1+0	0	8+0	0	3+0	0
5	MF	(Australia) AUS	Mark Milligan	11	1	1+0	0	7+0	0	3+0	1
13	MF	(Australia) AUS	Aaron Mooy	10	0	0+1	0	6+1	0	2+0	0
14	MF	(Australia) AUS	James Troisi	10	1	1+0	0	3+3	0	1+2	1
15	MF	(Australia) AUS	Mile Jedinak	5	3	0+0	0	5+0	3	0+0	0
15	MF	(Australia) AUS	Mustafa Amini	2	0	0+0	0	0+2	0	0+0	0
17	MF	(Australia) AUS	Ajdin Hrustic	1	0	0+1	0	0+0	0	0+0	0
21	MF	(Australia) AUS	Massimo Luongo	8	0	1+0	0	3+2	0	2+0	0
22	MF	(Australia) AUS	Jackson Irvine	8	1	0+1	0	5+0	1	1+1	0
23	MF	(Australia) AUS	Tom Rogic	10	2	0+1	0	5+2	1	2+0	1
4	FW	(Australia) AUS	Tim Cahill	10	2	1+0	0	3+3	2	1+2	0
7	FW	(Australia) AUS	Mathew Leckie	12	3	1+0	0	8+0	3	2+1	0
9	FW	(Australia) AUS	Tomi Juric	12	4	0+0	0	6+3	3	3+0	1
10	FW	(Australia) AUS	Robbie Kruse	12	1	1+0	0	4+4	1	2+1	0
11	FW	(Australia) AUS	Jamie Maclaren	3	0	0+1	0	0+1	0	0+1	0
17	FW	(Australia) AUS	Nikita Rukavytsya	3	0	0+0	0	0+3	0	0+0	0
