= 2015 Australia national soccer team season =

Australia
2015 season
- Chairman: Frank Lowy; Steven Lowy
- Manager: Ange Postecoglou
Home colours	Away colours

This page summarises the Australia national soccer team fixtures and results in 2015.

== Summary ==
As hosts, Australia won the AFC Asian Cup for the first time in January. The second half of the year saw qualification commence for the next World Cup and Asian Cup. By the end of the year Australia was sitting at the top of the qualification group with two games yet to be played. They were to finish 2015 ranked 57 in the FIFA rankings after falling to an all-time low of 100 at the end of 2014.

== Record ==
Type	GP	W	D	L	GF	GA
Friendly	2	0	2	0	2	2
Asian Cup	6	5	0	1	14	3
World Cup & Asian Cup qualifiers	6	5	0	1	17	3
Total	14	10	2	2	33	8

== Match results ==
=== Friendlies ===
25 March 2015	Germany	2–2	Australia	Kaiserslautern, Germany
20:30 UTC+1	Reus 17'; Podolski 81'	Report	Troisi 40'; Jedinak 50'	Stadium: Fritz-Walter-Stadion; Attendance: 47,106; Referee: Michael Oliver (England)

30 March 2015	Macedonia	0–0	Australia	Skopje, Macedonia
21:00 UTC+2		Report		Stadium: Philip II Arena; Attendance: 1,000; Referee: Edin Jakupović (Bosnia and Herzegovina)

=== Asian Cup ===
9 January 2015 Group stage	Australia	4–1	Kuwait	Melbourne, Australia
20:00 UTC+11	Cahill 32'; Luongo 44'; Jedinak 62' (pen.); Troisi 90+2'	Report	Fadhel 8'	Stadium: Melbourne Rectangular Stadium; Attendance: 25,231; Referee: Ravshan Irmatov (Uzbekistan)

13 January 2015 Group stage	Oman	0–4	Australia	Sydney, Australia
20:00 UTC+11		Report	McKay 27'; Kruse 30'; Milligan 45+3' (pen.); Juric 70'	Stadium: Stadium Australia; Attendance: 50,276; Referee: Ryuji Sato (Japan)

17 January 2015 Group stage	Australia	0–1	South Korea	Brisbane, Australia
19:00 UTC+10		Report	Lee Jung-hyup 33'	Stadium: Brisbane Stadium; Attendance: 48,513; Referee: Nawaf Shukralla (Bahrain)

22 January 2015 Quarter Final	China	0–2	Australia	Brisbane, Australia
20:30 UTC+10		Report	Cahill 49', 65'	Stadium: Brisbane Stadium; Attendance: 46,067; Referee: Kim Jong-hyeok (South Korea)

27 January 2015 Semi Final	Australia	2–0	United Arab Emirates	Newcastle, Australia
20:00 UTC+11	Sainsbury 3'; Davidson 14'	Report		Stadium: Newcastle Stadium; Attendance: 21,079; Referee: Ravshan Irmatov (Uzbekistan)

31 January 2015 Final	South Korea	1–2 (a.e.t.)	Australia	Sydney, Australia
20:00 UTC+11	Son Heung-min 90+1'	Report	Luongo 45'; Troisi 105'	Stadium: Stadium Australia; Attendance: 76,385; Referee: Alireza Faghani (Iran)

=== World Cup and Asian Cup qualifiers ===
16 June 2015 Group B	Kyrgyzstan	1–2	Australia	Bishkek, Kyrgyzstan
20:00 KGT (UTC+06:00)	Baymatov 90+2'	Report; Report (AFC)	Jedinak 2'; Oar 67'	Stadium: Dolen Omurzakov Stadium; Attendance: 18,000; Referee: Khamis Al Marri (Qatar)

3 September 2015 Group B	Australia	5–0	Bangladesh	Perth, Australia
19:00 AWST (UTC+08:00)	Leckie 6'; Rogić 8', 20'; Burns 29'; Mooy 61'	Report; Report (AFC)		Stadium: Perth Oval; Attendance: 19,495; Referee: Võ Minh Trí (Vietnam)

8 September 2015 Group B	Tajikistan	0–3	Australia	Dushanbe, Tajikistan
18:00 TJT (UTC+05:00)		Report; Report (AFC)	Milligan 57'; Cahill 73', 90+1'	Stadium: Pamir Stadium; Attendance: 19,000; Referee: Jameel Abdulhusin (Bahrain)

8 October 2015 Group B	Jordan	2–0	Australia	Amman, Jordan
17:00 AST (UTC+03:00)	Abdel-Fattah 47' (pen.); Al-Dardour 84'	Report; Report (AFC)		Stadium: Amman International Stadium; Attendance: 11,462; Referee: Masaaki Toma (Japan)

12 November 2015 Group B	Australia	3–0	Kyrgyzstan	Canberra, Australia
20:00 AEDT (UTC+11:00)	Jedinak 40' (pen.); Cahill 50'; Amirov 69' (o.g.)	Report; Report (AFC)		Stadium: Canberra Stadium; Attendance: 19,412; Referee: Kim Sang-woo (South Korea)

17 November 2015 Group B	Bangladesh	0–4	Australia	Dhaka, Bangladesh
17:30 BST (UTC+06:00)		Report; Report (AFC)	Cahill 6', 32', 37'; Jedinak 43'	Stadium: Bangabandhu National Stadium; Attendance: 19,730; Referee: Wang Di (China)

== Player statistics ==
Correct as of 17 November 2015 (v. Bangladesh).
Numbers are listed by player's number in AFC Asian Cup, WC&AFC Qualification or last friendly played

No.	Pos	Nat	Player	Total		Asian Cup		Friendlies		World Cup Qualifiers	
No.	Pos	Nat	Player	Apps	Goals	Apps	Goals	Apps	Goals	Apps	Goals
1	GK	(Australia) AUS	Mathew Ryan	8	0	6+0	0	1+0	0	1+0	0
12	GK	(Australia) AUS	Mitchell Langerak	1	0	0+0	0	0+1	0	0+0	0
18	GK	(Australia) AUS	Adam Federici	6	0	0+0	0	1+0	0	5+0	0
2	DF	(Australia) AUS	Ivan Franjic	8	0	6+0	0	1+0	0	1+0	0
2	DF	(Australia) AUS	James Meredith	2	0	0+0	0	0+0	0	2+0	0
3	DF	(Australia) AUS	Jason Davidson	9	1	4+0	1	1+0	0	3+1	0
6	DF	(Australia) AUS	Matthew Spiranovic	9	0	5+0	0	0+0	0	4+0	0
8	DF	(Australia) AUS	Bailey Wright	7	0	0+0	0	0+2	0	5+0	0
13	DF	(Australia) AUS	Aziz Behich	4	0	2+0	0	1+0	0	1+0	0
19	DF	(Australia) AUS	Ryan McGowan	2	0	0+0	0	0+0	0	2+0	0
20	DF	(Australia) AUS	Trent Sainsbury	8	1	6+0	1	1+0	0	1+0	0
22	DF	(Australia) AUS	Alex Wilkinson	5	0	1+0	0	2+0	0	2+0	0
23	DF	(Australia) AUS	Tarek Elrich	3	0	0+0	0	1+0	0	2+0	0
23	DF	(Australia) AUS	Josh Risdon	1	0	0+0	0	0+0	0	1+0	0
24	DF	(Australia) AUS	Luke DeVere	1	0	0+0	0	1+0	0	0+0	0
2	MF	(Australia) AUS	Jackson Irvine	1	0	0+0	0	0+0	0	0+1	0
5	MF	(Australia) AUS	Mark Milligan	11	2	4+1	1	1+0	0	5+0	1
9	MF	(Australia) AUS	Chris Ikonomidis	2	0	0+0	0	0+1	0	0+1	0
10	MF	(Australia) AUS	Oliver Bozanic	2	0	0+0	0	0+2	0	0+0	0
10	MF	(Australia) AUS	Tom Rogić	4	2	0+0	0	0+0	0	2+2	2
11	MF	(Australia) AUS	Tommy Oar	7	1	0+1	0	0+2	0	1+3	1
13	MF	(Australia) AUS	Aaron Mooy	7	1	0+0	0	1+1	0	5+0	1
14	MF	(Australia) AUS	James Troisi	10	3	2+3	2	2+0	1	1+2	0
15	MF	(Australia) AUS	Mile Jedinak	9	5	4+0	1	2+0	1	3+0	3
17	MF	(Australia) AUS	Matt McKay	8	1	2+2	1	1+0	0	2+1	0
21	MF	(Australia) AUS	Massimo Luongo	12	2	6+0	2	1+0	0	5+0	0
23	MF	(Australia) AUS	Mark Bresciano	3	0	1+2	0	0+0	0	0+0	0
4	FW	(Australia) AUS	Tim Cahill	12	9	5+1	3	0+0	0	4+2	6
7	FW	(Australia) AUS	Mathew Leckie	12	1	5+1	0	2+0	0	4+0	1
9	FW	(Australia) AUS	Tomi Juric	10	1	1+4	1	0+2	0	1+2	0
10	FW	(Australia) AUS	Robbie Kruse	6	1	5+1	1	0+0	0	0+0	0
16	FW	(Australia) AUS	Nathan Burns	11	1	1+2	0	2+0	0	3+3	1
