= List of Newcastle Jets FC players =

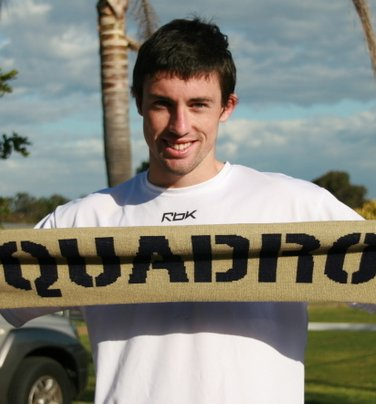
Jason Hoffman has made the most at 214 appearances for Newcastle.

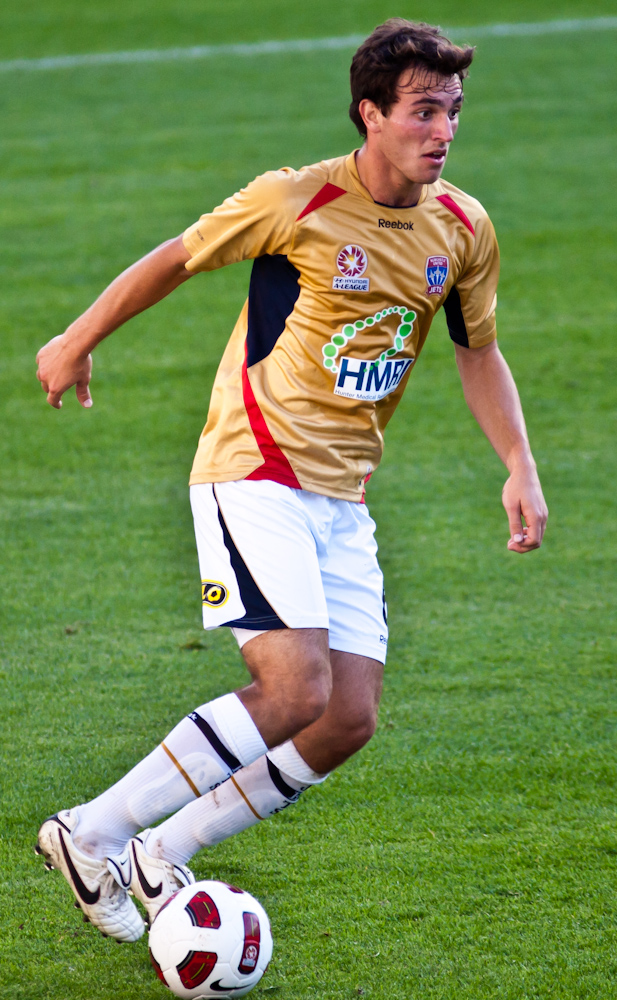
Ben Kantarovski is Newcastle Jets' second most capped player of all time having made 210 appearances in 12 years for the club.

Newcastle Jets Football Club is an Australian professional association football club based in Newcastle, New South Wales. The club was formed in 2000 as Newcastle United, and played their first competitive match in October 2000, when they entered the First Round of the 2000–01 National Soccer League. The club was renamed Newcastle Jets in 2004. Since playing their first competitive match, over 200 players have made a competitive first-team appearance for the club, of whom 14 players have made at least 100 appearances (including substitute appearances).

Newcastle Jets' record appearance-maker is Jason Hoffman, who has made a total of 214 appearances over a current 11-year playing career. Ben Kantarovski holds the record for the most starts, having started in 176 matches. Joel Griffiths is the club's top goalscorer with 61 goals in his 6 years with the club. Labinot Haliti's 46 substitute appearances for the side is a club record.

== Key ==
- The list is ordered first by date of debut, and then if necessary in alphabetical order.
- Appearances as a substitute are included.
- Statistics are correct up to and including 26 May 2026. Where a player left the club permanently after this date, his statistics are updated to his date of leaving.

Positions key
GK	Goalkeeper
DF	Defender
MF	Midfielder
FW	Forward

Nationality
Unless otherwise noted, the nationality of a player is determined by the country/countries which he has played for, or if said person has not played international football, their country of birth.
Position
Playing positions are listed according to the tactical formations that were employed at the time.
Club career
Club career is defined as the first and last calendar years in which the player appeared for the club in any of the competitions listed below.
Total appearances and Total goals
Total appearances and goals comprise those in the National Soccer League, A-League Men, Australia Cup, A-League Pre-Season Challenge Cup, AFC Champions League and the 2005 Australian Club World Championship Qualifying Tournament.

== Players ==
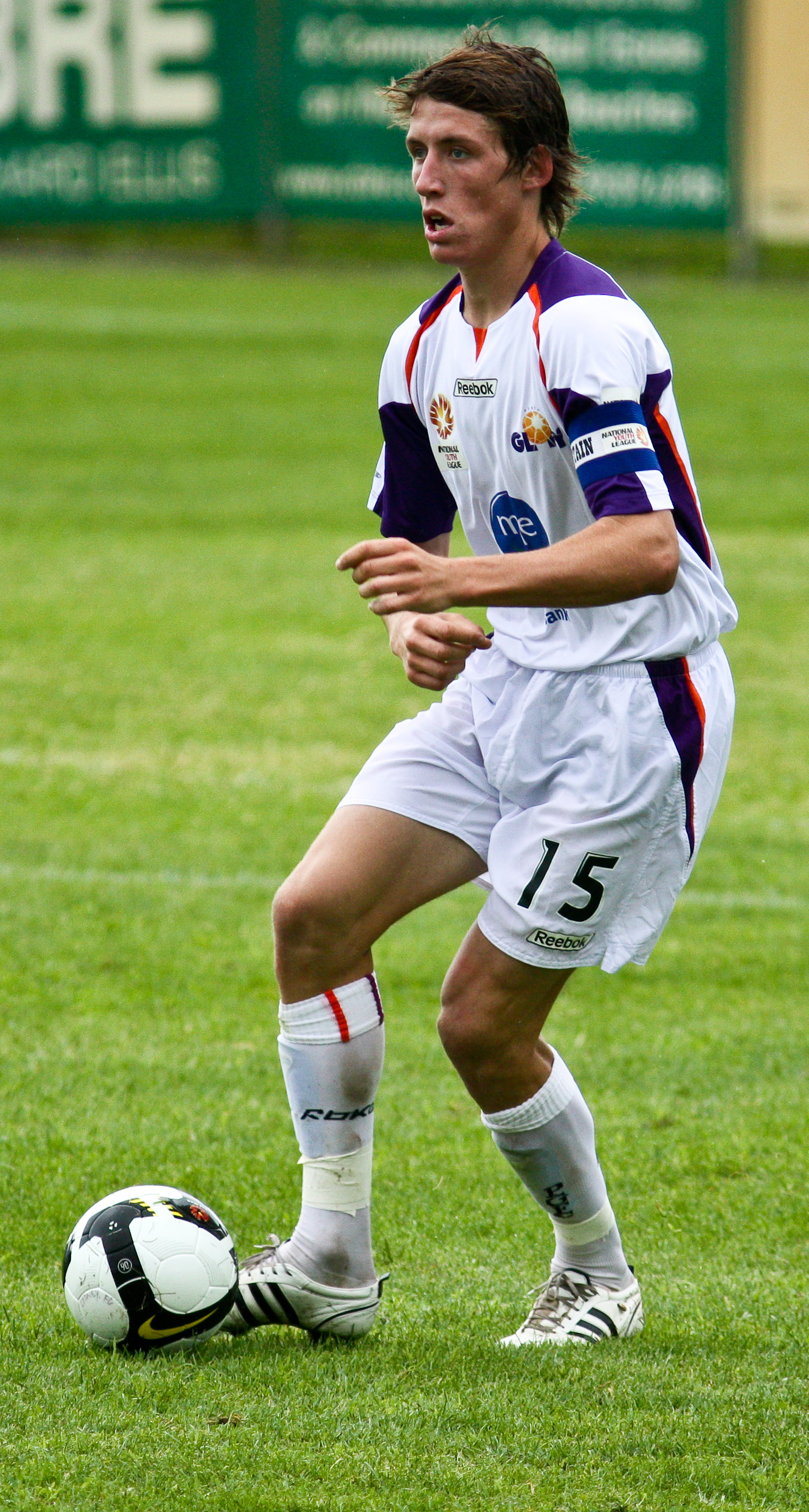
Scott Neville made 106 appearances over two spells with the club.

Players highlighted in bold are still actively playing at Newcastle

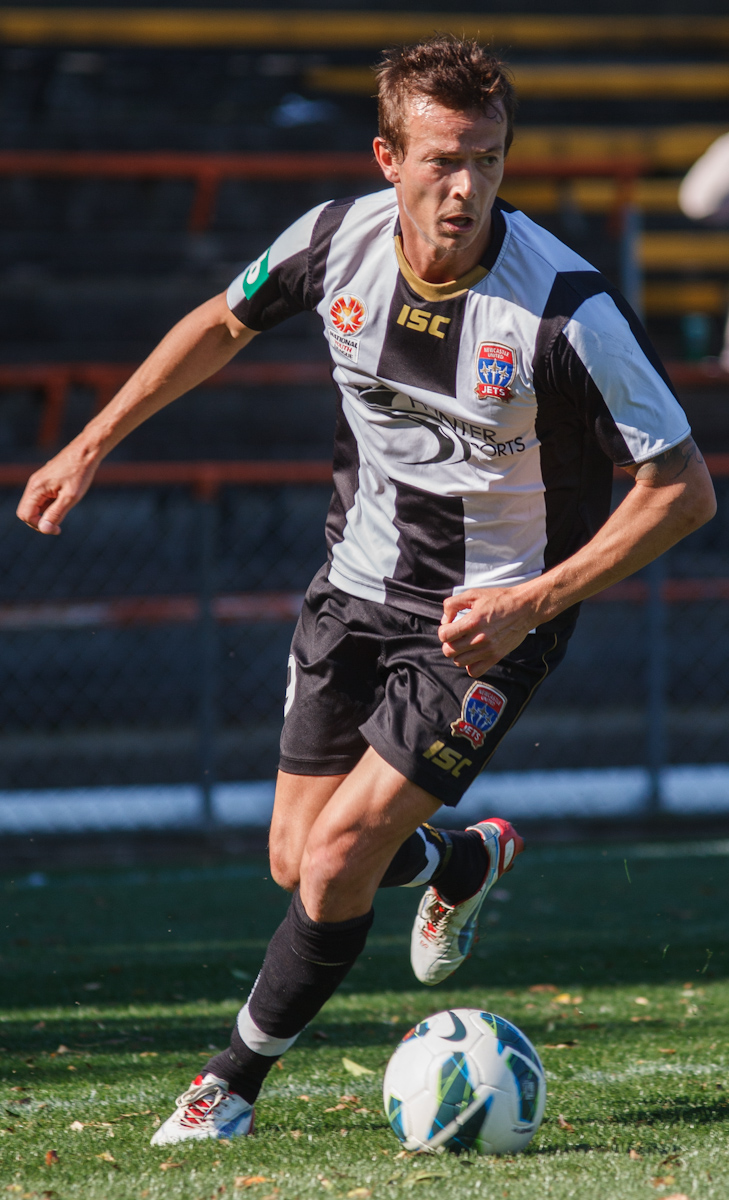
Ryan Griffiths scored 28 goals for the Jets, more than any player except his brother Joel.

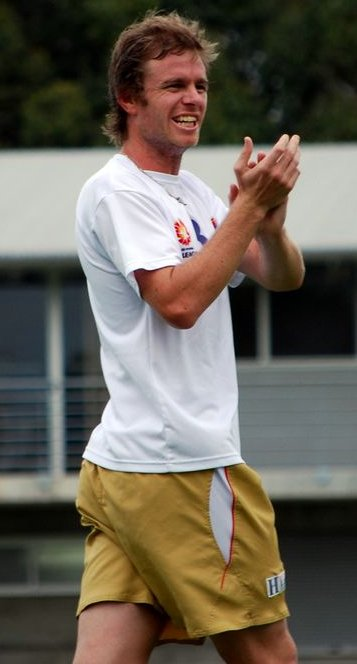
Matt Thompson captained the Jets from 2009 to 2010.

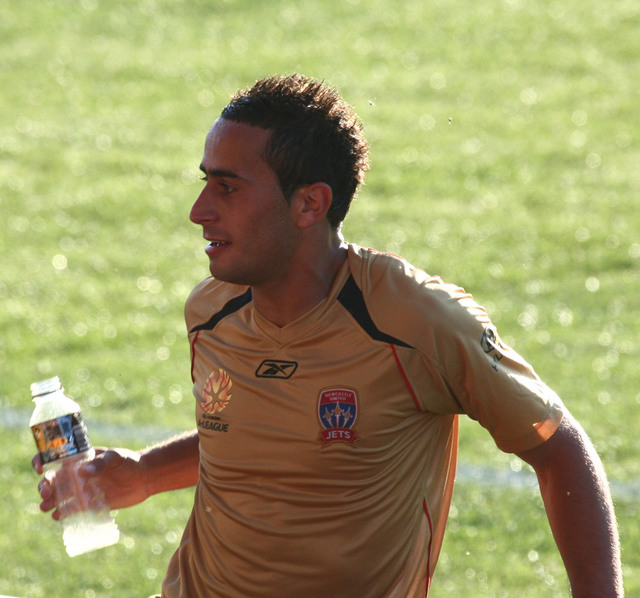
Tarek Elrich played 114 games for the Jets.

List of Newcastle Jets FC players with 100 or more appearances
Player	Nationality	Pos	Club career	Starts	Subs	Total	Goals	Ref.
Player	Nationality	Pos	Club career	Appearances			Goals	Ref.
Joel Griffiths	Australia	FW	2001–2003; 2006–2009; 2014–2015	130	8	138	61	
Ryan Griffiths	Australia	FW	2002–2004; 2011–2013	93	15	108	28	
Jobe Wheelhouse	Australia	MF	2003–2013	116	25	141	13	
Nigel Boogaard	Australia	DF	2004; 2015–2021	126	2	128	5	
Labinot Haliti	Australia	FW	2005–2006; 2009–2012; 2015–2017	65	46	111	16	
Matt Thompson	Australia	DF	2005–2010	144	1	145	20	
Tarek Elrich	Australia	DF	2005–2012	135	18	153	5	
Adam D'Apuzzo	Australia	DF	2006–2011	97	25	122	0	
Ben Kennedy	Australia	GK	2006–2016	125	3	128	0	
Jason Hoffman	Australia	FW	2007–2010; 2015–2024	181	58	239	17	
Ben Kantarovski	Australia	MF	2008–2020	176	34	210	9	
Nikolai Topor-Stanley	Australia	DF	2009–2012; 2017–2021	198	4	202	9	
Steven Ugarkovic	Australia	MF	2016–2021	139	5	144	9	
Angus Thurgate	Australia	MF	2018–2023	95	30	125	11	
**Kosta Grozos**	Australia	MF	2021–	96	30	126	6	

== Captains ==
Dates	Captain
2005–2006	(Australia) Ned Zelic
2006–2007	(Australia) Paul Okon
2007–2009	(Australia) Jade North
2009–2010	(Australia) Matt Thompson
2010–2011	(England) Michael Bridges
2011–2013	(Australia) Jobe Wheelhouse
2014–2015	(Netherlands) Kew Jaliens
2015	(Australia) Taylor Regan
2015–2021	(Australia) Nigel Boogaard
2021–present	(Australia) Matthew Jurman
2022–present	(England) Carl Jenkinson
2022–present	(Australia) Brandon O'Neill
