= James Holland (soccer) =

Australian footballer (born 1989)

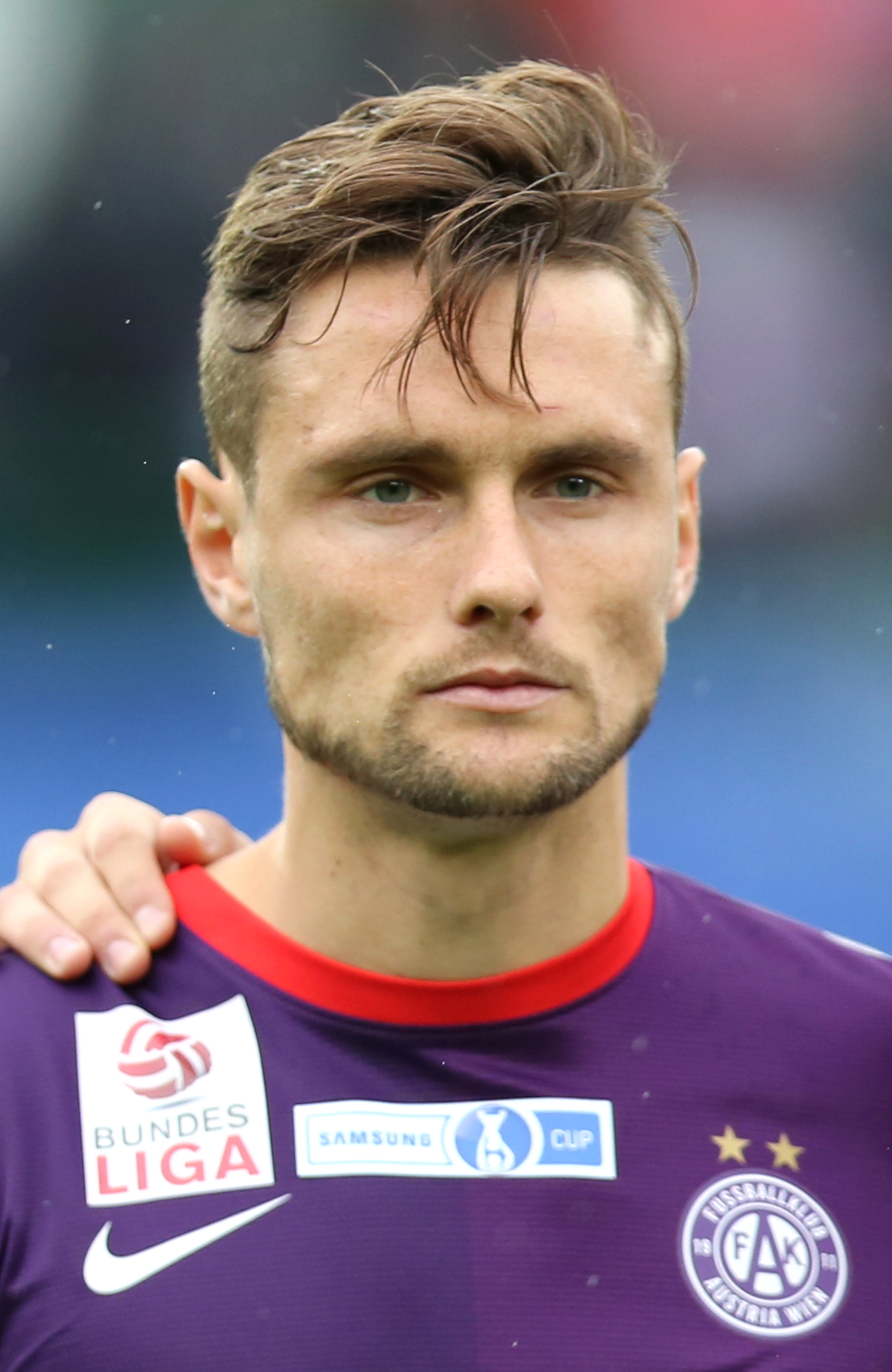
- Holland with Austria Wien in 2013

Personal information
- Full name: James Robert Holland
- Date of birth: 15 May 1989 (age 37)
- Place of birth: Newcastle, New South Wales, Australia
- Height: 1.82 m (6 ft 0 in)
- Position: Central midfielder

Team information
- Current team: Nottingham Forest (first-team coach)

Youth career
- 2005–2006: NSWIS
- 2007: AIS

Senior career*
Years	Team	Apps	(Gls)
2006	Central Coast Mariners	0	(0)
2007	AIS	24	(3)
2007–2009	Newcastle Jets	23	(3)
2009–2012	AZ	0	(0)
2011–2012	→ Sparta Rotterdam (loan)	14	(2)
2012–2015	Austria Wien	105	(0)
2015–2016	MSV Duisburg	29	(0)
2016–2017	Adelaide United	13	(0)
2017	Liaoning Whowin	1	(0)
2017–2022	LASK	118	(8)
2022–2024	Austria Wien	35	(0)

International career^{‡}
2007–2009	Australia U-20	25	(5)
2008–2012	Australia U-23	5	(0)
2008–2021	Australia	17	(0)
- * Club domestic league appearances and goals as of 26 May 2024 ‡ National team caps and goals as of 2 February 2022

James Robert Holland (born 15 May 1989) is an Australian soccer coach and former player who played as a midfielder. He is currently first-team coach at Premier League club Nottingham Forest

Born in Newcastle, New South Wales, Holland played youth football at the New South Wales Institute of Sport before making his professional debut for Central Coast Mariners in 2006. He went on to play for the Australian Institute of Sport before spending two seasons with Newcastle Jets. He then moved to Europe, playing in the Netherlands, Germany and Austria, most notably for Austria Wien. In 2016, he returned to Australia to play for Adelaide United.

Holland debuted for the Australian national team in 2008. He has gone on to represent Australia over ten times, and was a member of the squad at the 2014 FIFA World Cup.

== Club career ==
Holland captained the NSW Under-16 side at the 2005 Qantas National Talent Identification Championships in Parklea, a tournament the NSW team ultimately won. He was a 2007 AIS Football scholarship holder and was an influential player in their successful campaign in the Victorian Premier League.

=== Newcastle Jets ===
Holland made an A-League debut with the Newcastle Jets playing two games as a short-term injury replacement player. He scored a goal against Wellington Phoenix in his first game, making him the youngest player to score in the A-League.

In October 2007, he signed a full-time two-year professional contract with the Newcastle Jets, despite interest from his home town club and Newcastle's rivals the Central Coast Mariners. He had previously made three appearances for the Mariners on a short-term contract during the 2006 A-League Pre-Season Challenge Cup.

Holland was part of the Newcastle Jets team which won the 2008 A-League Grand Final against the Central Coast Mariners. He was involved in a controversy during second-half injury time when he handballed inside the penalty area. Referee Mark Shield failed to spot the handball and did not award a penalty. Holland later stated that he didn't feel the ball hit his arm and that it wasn't an "intentional" act.

=== AZ Alkmaar ===
On 11 January 2009, Dutch club AZ Alkmaar completed the signing of the Australian midfielder for $650,000 (€350,000) on a four-and-a-half-year contract from the Newcastle Jets. He had earlier successfully trialled at the club.

=== Sparta Rotterdam ===
On 19 January 2011, it was announced that Holland would be playing for Eerste Divisie club Sparta Rotterdam for the rest of the season.

=== Austria Wien ===
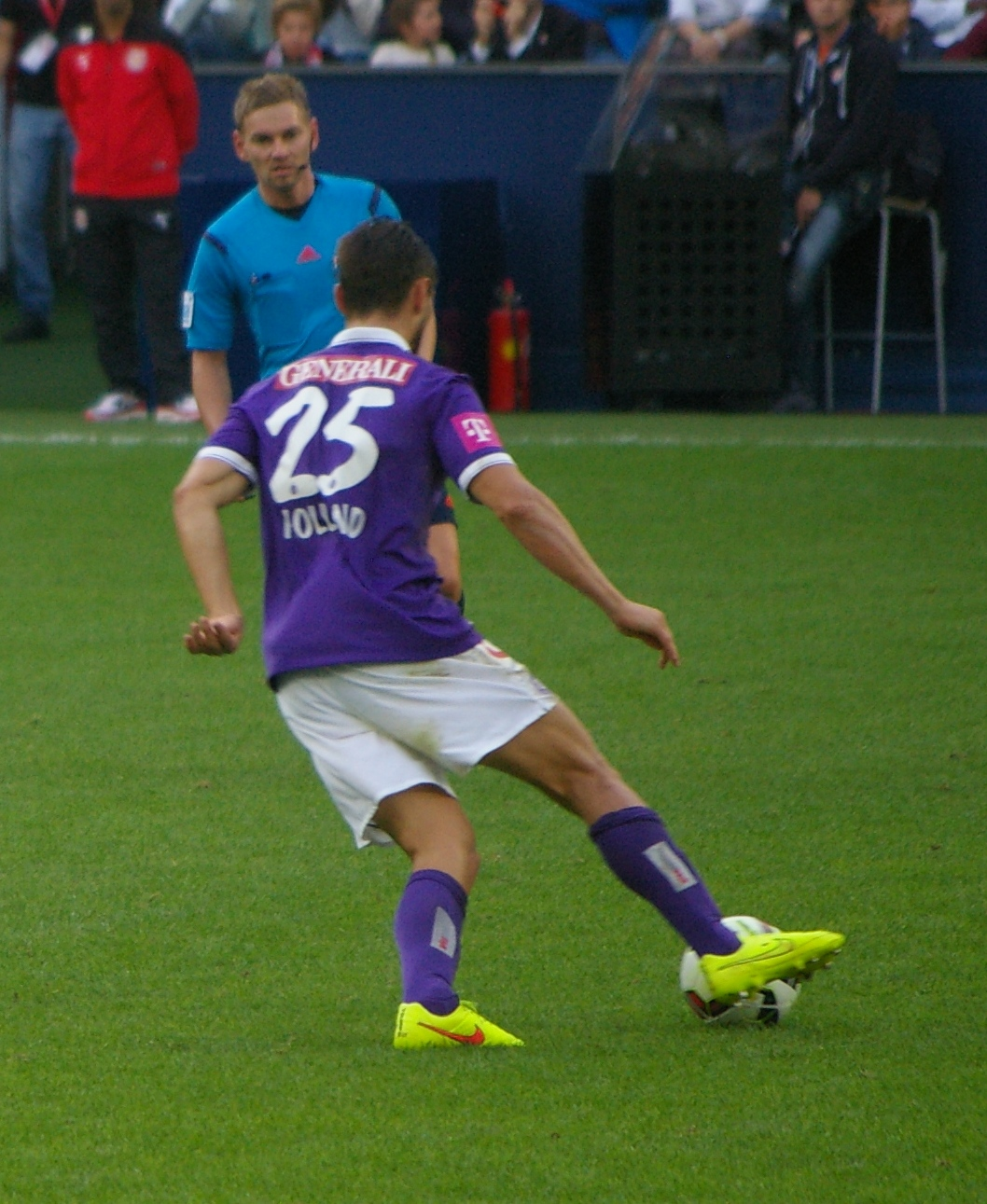
Holland (right) in action for Austria Wien in 2014

On 17 January 2012, it was announced Holland had signed a one-and-a-half-year contract with Austrian Bundesliga club Austria Wien after successfully trialling with the club.

=== MSV Duisburg ===
Holland joined MSV Duisburg of the 2. Bundesliga for the 2015–16 season.

=== Adelaide United ===
In September 2016, Holland signed a two-year contract with Adelaide United, returning to the A-League. On 12 January 2017, Adelaide United's coach Guillermo Amor confirmed that Holland had exited Adelaide United to go to China.

=== Liaoning Whowin ===
On 18 January 2017, it was confirmed that Holland had joined Chinese Super League club Liaoning Whowin alongside fellow Australian Robbie Kruse on a two-year deal.

In May 2017, both players terminated their contracts with Liaoning Whowin due to unpaid wages.

=== Return to Austria ===
Holland returned to Austria in June 2017 to play for newly promoted Bundesliga side LASK.

== International career ==
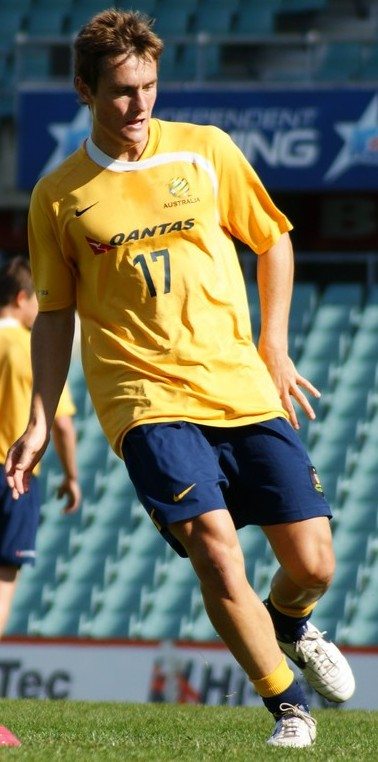
Holland with Australia in 2008

James is an Australian Under-20 and Under-23 national team representative, a striker in this squad playing alongside Marko Jesic, Holland's good friend. He made his full debut for the Socceroos against Singapore in 2008, and was named in the squad to face Ghana on 23 May 2008. He played in the World Cup qualifier against China on 22 June 2008, and was substituted for David Williams.

He has since captained the Young Socceroos AFF U19 Championship after defeating Korea Republic 3–1 on penalties. James Holland was selected for the Young Socceroos Squad for the 2009 FIFA U-20 World Cup in Egypt, he was also named captain for the Young Socceroos. He scored a penalty in the first match against the Czech Republic in the 94th minute in the 2–1 loss, he had missed the first penalty but it was re-taken for infringement. He was selected as a member of Australia's 2014 FIFA World Cup squad in Brazil. Holland remained an unused substitute throughout the tournament.

== Career statistics ==
=== Club ===
As of 20 January 2024

Appearances and goals by club, season and competition
Club	Season	League			Cup		Continental		Total	
Club	Season	Division	Apps	Goals	Apps	Goals	Apps	Goals	Apps	Goals
Central Coast Mariners	2006–07	A-League	0	0	3	0	-	-	3	0
AIS	2007	Victorian Premier League	24	3	0	0	-	-	24	3
Newcastle Jets	2007–08	A-League	11	3	0	0	-	-	11	3
Newcastle Jets	2008–09	A-League	12	0	0	0	0	0	12	0
Newcastle Jets	Total		23	3	0	0	0	0	23	3
AZ Alkmaar	2009–10	Eredivisie	0	0	0	0	0	0	0	0
Sparta Rotterdam (loan)	2010–11	Eerste Divisie	14	2	0	0	-	-	14	2
Austria Wien	2011–12	Austrian Bundesliga	11	0	2	0	-	-	13	0
Austria Wien	2012–13	Austrian Bundesliga	34	0	5	0	-	-	39	0
Austria Wien	2013–14	Austrian Bundesliga	33	0	1	0	9	0	43	0
Austria Wien	2014–15	Austrian Bundesliga	27	0	4	0	-	-	31	0
Austria Wien	Total		105	0	12	0	9	0	126	0
MSV Duisburg	2015–16	2. Bundesliga	29	0	1	0	-	-	30	0
Adelaide United	2016–17	A-League	13	0	0	0	0	0	13	0
Liaoning Whowin	2017	Chinese Super League	1	0	0	0	0	0	1	0
LASK	2017–18	Austrian Bundesliga	23	0	1	0	0	0	24	0
LASK	2018–19	Austrian Bundesliga	28	3	3	0	4	1	35	4
LASK	2019–20	Austrian Bundesliga	29	2	5	0	10	1	44	3
LASK	2020–21	Austrian Bundesliga	27	3	6	0	6	0	39	3
LASK	2021–22	Austrian Bundesliga	23	0	3	0	7	0	35	0
LASK	Total		130	8	18	0	27	2	175	10
Austria Wien	2022–23	Austrian Bundesliga	19	0	3	0	6	0	28	0
Austria Wien	2023–24	Austrian Bundesliga	9	0	3	1	4	0	16	1
Austria Wien	Total		28	0	6	1	10	0	44	1
FK Austria Wien II	2022–23	2. Liga	1	0	0	0	0	0	1	0
Career total			368	16	40	0	46	2	454	18

=== International ===
As of match played 3 June 2021

Appearances and goals by national team and year
National team	Year	Apps	Goals
Australia	2008	3	0
Australia	2009	1	0
Australia	2010	1	0
Australia	2012	3	0
Australia	2013	4	0
Australia	2014	3	0
Australia	2021	1	0
Total		16	0

== Honours ==
Newcastle Jets

- A-League: 2007–08

Austria Wien

- Austrian Football Bundesliga: 2012–13

Australia

- AFF U-19 Youth Championship: 2008

== See also ==
- List of Central Coast Mariners FC players
- List of Newcastle Jets FC players
