= Brett Holman =

Australian soccer player (born 1984)

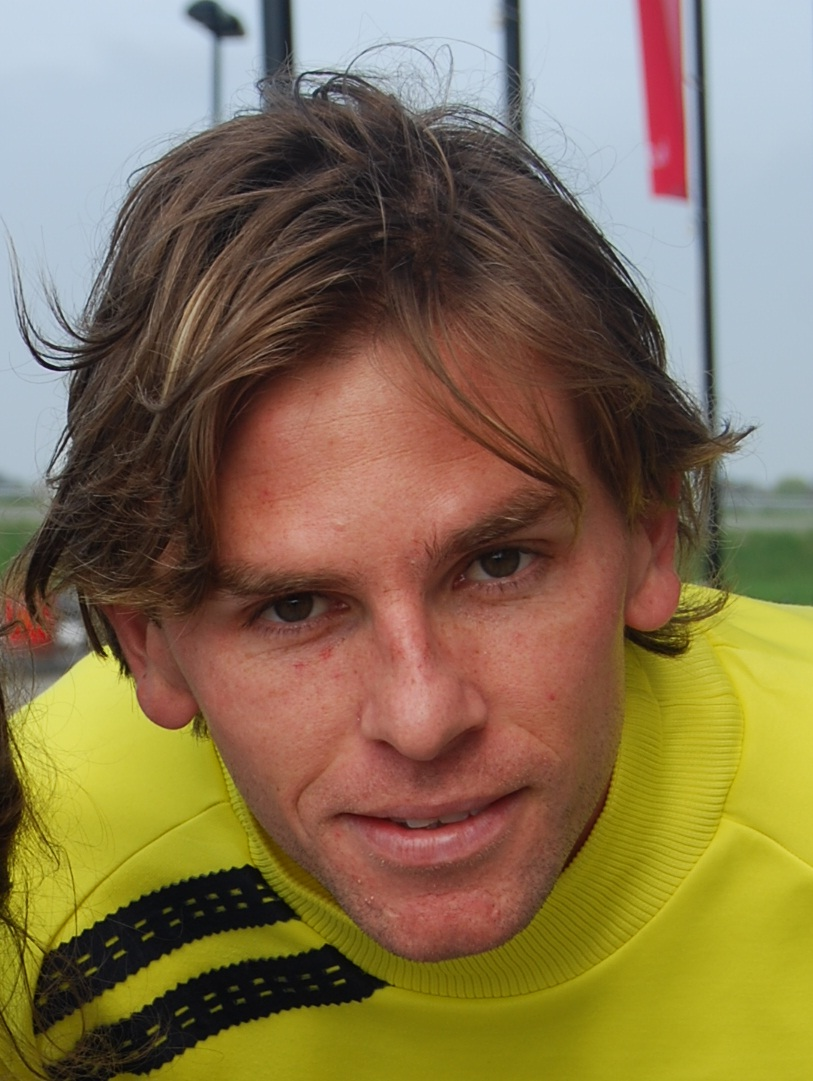
- Holman in 2011

Personal information
- Full name: Brett Trevor Holman
- Date of birth: 27 March 1984 (age 42)
- Place of birth: Bankstown, Sydney Australia
- Height: 1.77 m (5 ft 10 in)
- Position: Attacking midfielder

Youth career
- Northern Spirit

Senior career*
Years	Team	Apps	(Gls)
2001–2002	Parramatta Power	13	(5)
2002–2006	Feyenoord	0	(0)
2002–2006	→ Excelsior (loan)	134	(39)
2006–2008	NEC Nijmegen	59	(13)
2008–2012	AZ	92	(16)
2012–2013	Aston Villa	27	(1)
2013–2015	Al Nasr	50	(8)
2015–2016	Emirates Club	20	(5)
2016–2019	Brisbane Roar	38	(10)
Total		433	(97)

International career
2000–2001	Australia U17	10	(3)
2003–2004	Australia U23	16	(6)
2006–2013	Australia	63	(9)
Medal record
Men's football
Representing Australia
AFC Asian Cup
Runner-up	2011 Qatar
OFC U-16/U-17 Championship
Winner	2001
- * Club domestic league appearances and goals as of 5 May 2018

Brett Trevor Holman (born 27 March 1984) is an Australian former professional soccer player who played as an attacking midfielder.

He played youth football for Northern Spirit before making his senior debut for Parramatta Power. He then moved to the Netherlands, where he played for a number of years before moving to Aston Villa in 2012 to play in the English Premier League. Holman moved to the UAE one year later, before returning to Australia to play for Brisbane Roar in 2016.

Holman represented Australia over 60 times between 2006 and 2013, scoring eight goals. This included goals at the 2010 FIFA World Cup and the 2011 AFC Asian Cup. He had previously represented Australia several times at youth level, including travelling to the 2004 Summer Olympics and the 2001 FIFA U-17 World Championship.

== Early life ==
Brett Holman was born in Bankstown, Sydney. He grew up in the Sydney suburb of Croydon Park. He attended Christian Brothers' High School, Lewisham. He played junior football for the Enfield Rovers Soccer Club based in the inner west of Sydney. He left school in late 2000 to pursue his footballing career, signing with the Parramatta Power.

== Club career ==
Holman played for Northern Spirit and Parramatta Power in Australia before moving to Dutch football club Feyenoord in 2002. Once in the Netherlands he played for Excelsior Rotterdam on loan before NEC Nijmegen signed him in 2006.

On 7 April 2007 Holman scored two goals for NEC Nijmegen against Eredivisie leaders, PSV Eindhoven. He was named man of the match, as NEC Nijmegen won 2–1. He was signed by AZ Alkmaar manager Louis van Gaal in the European summer of 2008 for €3 million.

On 1 November 2008 Holman scored his first goal for AZ Alkmaar in a 3–3 away draw against SC Heerenveen at the Abe Lenstra Stadion in Heerenveen after coming on as a second-half replacement for Nick van der Velden.

During most of the AZ Alkmaar's title-winning 2008–09 Eredivisie season Holman struggled for starting opportunities and at the end of the campaign was rumoured to be on his way out at the club. However, he was retained and was given more playing time under the new manager.

Under Dick Advocaat Holman has been given substantially more game time, including a number of appearances in the UEFA Europa League. On matchday 6, Holman impressed in AZ Alkmaar's 1–1 draw against Standard Liège.

=== Aston Villa ===
In March 2012, Holman signed a pre-contract agreement with Aston Villa, to join the club when his AZ contract expired that summer.

On 1 July 2012, 28-year-old Holman officially became an Aston Villa player. On 14 July Holman scored on his debut, in a 2–1 victory against Burton Albion in the first match of pre-season. He then scored his second goal for Villa in another pre-season match, this time against Peterborough United in a 2–0 victory on 1 August 2012. On 1 December 2012, Holman scored his first league goal away at QPR. He then followed this up with his first League Cup goal for Villa, scoring the first of four in a 4–1 victory over Norwich City in the quarter-finals.

On 21 June 2013, he was released by mutual consent at the end of the 2012–13 season. He then joined Al Nasr in Dubai, signing a two-year contract.

=== Brisbane Roar ===
On 1 September 2016, it was confirmed that he had signed for Brisbane Roar in the A-League on a 2-year deal where he will be paid within the cap in the first year and as marquee in the second year.

In November 2021, Holman won a legal battle against Brisbane Roar over insurance money the club withheld when he suffered a career-ending injury, with the Roar ordered to pay Holman $369,433.26 for an insurance payout, $41,815 in interest, as well as covering his court costs.

== International career ==
Holman made his international debut for Australia in 2006 against Bahrain.

On 19 June 2010, Holman scored the opening goal against Ghana at the 2010 FIFA World Cup in South Africa in a 1–1 draw, following up from a Marco Bresciano free kick. On 24 June 2010, he then scored the second goal in the final group stage match against Serbia with a swerving 25-yard drive. On 10 January 2011, Holman scored the third goal in Australia's 4–0 win over India in the Asian Cup. Holman scored a crucial equaliser for Australia against Oman in Sydney on 26 March 2013 in a World Cup Qualifier.

On 30 April 2014, Holman announced his retirement from international football.

== Career statistics ==
=== Club ===
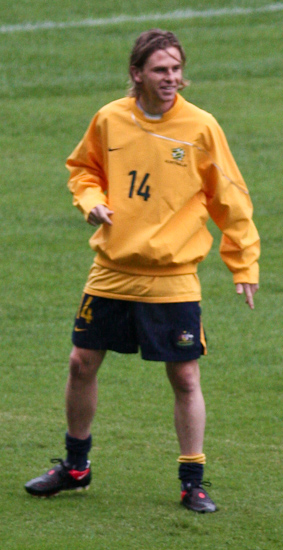
Holman training with Australia in 2009

As of 1 June 2020

Appearances and goals by club, season and competition
Club	Season	League			Cup		Continental		Total	
Club	Season	Division	Apps	Goals	Apps	Goals	Apps	Goals	Apps	Goals
Parramatta Power	2000–01	NSL	1	0	0	0	0	0	1	0
Parramatta Power	2001–02	NSL	12	5	0	0	0	0	12	5
Parramatta Power	Total		13	5	0	0	0	0	13	5
Excelsior Rotterdam (loan)	2002–03	Eredivisie	30	6	2	0	0	0	32	6
Excelsior Rotterdam (loan)	2003–04	Eredivisie	34	6	1	1	0	0	35	7
Excelsior Rotterdam (loan)	2004–05	Eerste Divisie	33	13	2	1	0	0	35	14
Excelsior Rotterdam (loan)	2005–06	Eerste Divisie	37	14	3	1	0	0	40	15
Excelsior Rotterdam (loan)	Total		134	39	8	3	0	0	142	42
NEC Nijmegen	2006–07	Eredivisie	32	7	0	0	0	0	32	7
NEC Nijmegen	2007–08	Eredivisie	27	6	2	2	0	0	29	8
NEC Nijmegen	Total		59	13	2	2	0	0	61	15
AZ Alkmaar	2008–09	Eredivisie	16	1	2	0	0	0	18	1
AZ Alkmaar	2009–10	Eredivisie	24	5	2	1	6	0	32	6
AZ Alkmaar	2010–11	Eredivisie	26	4	2	0	8	2	36	6
AZ Alkmaar	2011–12	Eredivisie	25	4	4	0	13	3	42	7
AZ Alkmaar	Total		91	14	10	1	27	5	128	20
Aston Villa	2012–13	Premier League	27	1	2	1	0	0	29	2
Al-Nasr	2013–14	UAE Arabian Gulf League	26	3	2	0	0	0	28	3
Al-Nasr	2014–15	UAE Arabian Gulf League	24	5	8	1	0	0	32	6
Al-Nasr	Total		50	8	10	1	0	0	60	9
Emirates Club	2015–16	UAE Arabian Gulf League	20	5	3	0	0	0	23	5
Brisbane Roar	2016–17	A-League	21	5	0	0	5	1	26	6
Brisbane Roar	2017–18	A-League	17	5	1	0	1	0	19	5
Brisbane Roar	2018–19	A-League	0	0	0	0	0	0	0	0
Brisbane Roar	Total		38	10	1	0	6	1	45	11
Career total			349	78	23	7	29	5	401	90

=== International ===
Appearances and goals by national team and year
National team	Year	Apps	Goals
Australia	2006	3	0
Australia	2007	8	1
Australia	2008	10	0
Australia	2009	8	0
Australia	2010	9	4
Australia	2011	15	3
Australia	2012	4	0
Australia	2013	6	1
Total		63	9

Scores and results list Australia's goal tally first, score column indicates score after each Holman goal.

List of international goals scored by Brett Holman
No.	Date	Venue	Opponent	Score	Result	Competition	Ref.
1	24 March 2007	Yuexiushan Stadium, Guangzhou, China	China	1–0	2–0	Friendly	
2	24 May 2010	Melbourne Cricket Ground, Melbourne, Australia	New Zealand	2–1	2–1	Friendly	
3	19 June 2010	Royal Bafokeng Stadium, Phokeng, South Africa	Ghana	1–0	1–1	2010 FIFA World Cup	
4	23 June 2010	Mbombela Stadium, Mbombela, South Africa	Serbia	2–0	2–1	2010 FIFA World Cup	
5	7 September 2010	Henryk Reyman Municipal Stadium, Kraków, Poland	Poland	1–0	2–1	Friendly	
6	10 January 2011	Jassim bin Hamad Stadium, Al Rayyan, Qatar	India	3–0	4–0	2011 AFC Asian Cup	
7	11 October 2011	ANZ Stadium, Sydney, Australia	Oman	1–0	3–0	2014 FIFA World Cup qualification	
8	15 November 2011	Suphachalasai Stadium, Bangkok, Thailand	Thailand	1–0	1–0	2014 FIFA World Cup qualification	
9	26 March 2013	ANZ Stadium, Sydney, Australia	Oman	2–2	2–2	2014 FIFA World Cup qualification	

== Honours ==
AZ

- Eredivisie: 2008–09
- Dutch Super Cup: 2009

Al-Nasr

- UAE League Cup: 2014–15
- UAE President's Cup: 2014–15

Australia

- AFC Asian Cup: runner-up 2011

Australia U-17

- OFC U-17 Championship: 2001

Individual

- FFA Male Footballer of the Year: 2012

== See also ==
- List of Australia international soccer players with over 50 caps
- List of foreign football players in the Netherlands
- List of foreign Premier League players
