= Mile Jedinak =

Australian soccer player (born 1984)

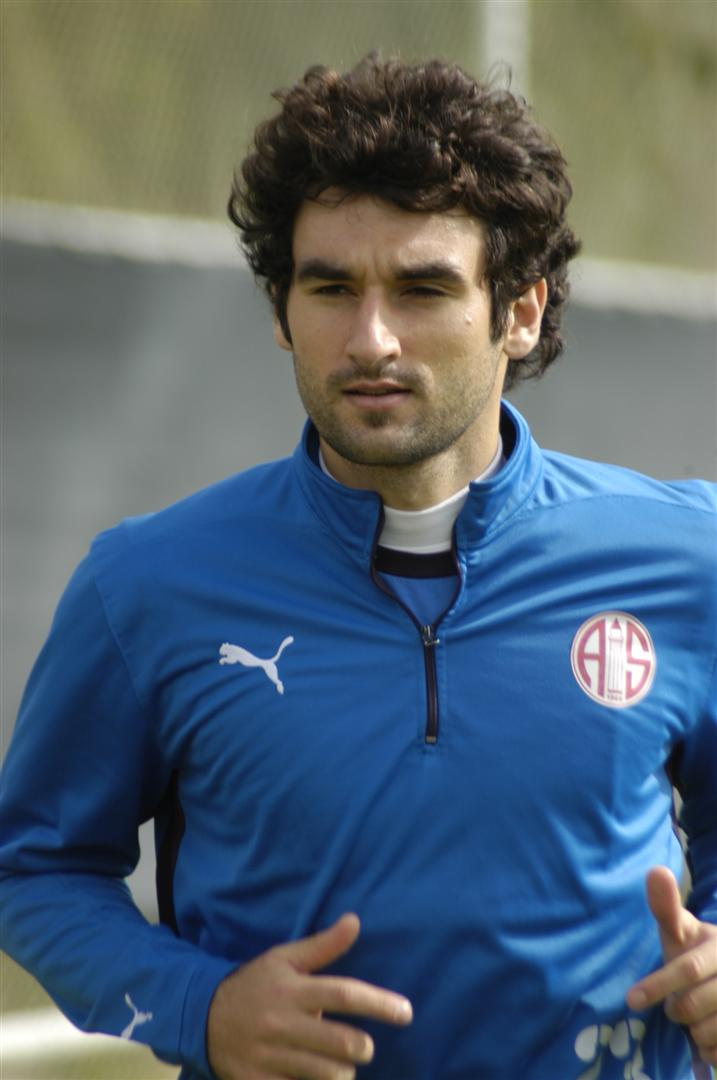
- Jedinak with Antalyaspor in 2009

Personal information
- Full name: Michael John Jedinak
- Date of birth: 3 August 1984 (age 42)
- Place of birth: Camperdown, New South Wales, Australia
- Height: 1.89 m (6 ft 2 in)
- Position: Defensive midfielder

Team information
- Current team: Australia (assistant coach)

Youth career
- Sydney United

Senior career*
Years	Team	Apps	(Gls)
2001–2006	Sydney United	84	(12)
2003–2004	→ Varteks (loan)	0	(0)
2005	→ South Coast United (loan)	18	(7)
2006–2009	Central Coast Mariners	45	(8)
2009–2011	Gençlerbirliği	38	(4)
2009–2010	→ Antalyaspor (loan)	28	(5)
2011–2016	Crystal Palace	165	(10)
2016–2019	Aston Villa	70	(2)
Total		421	(39)

International career
2003	Australia U20	9	(0)
2008–2018	Australia	79	(20)

Managerial career
- 2023–2025: Tottenham Hotspur (assistant)
- 2025: Nottingham Forest (assistant)
- 2026–: Australia (assistant)
Medal record
Representing Australia
AFC Asian Cup
Winner	2015 Australia
Runner-up	2011 Qatar
- * Club domestic league appearances and goals

Michael John "Mile" Jedinak (Croatian pronunciation: [milê jědinak]; /ˈmɪleɪ ˈjɛdɪnæk/ MIL-eɪ YED-ih-nak; born 3 August 1984) is an Australian professional soccer coach and former player who played as a defensive midfielder. He is currently an assistant coach of the Australia men's national team.

Jedinak was born and raised in Sydney, and played youth football with Sydney United before starting his senior career at the club. Following loan spells at Varteks and South Coast United, Jedinak moved to Central Coast Mariners in 2006. He subsequently had spells with Turkish clubs Gençlerbirliği and Antalyaspor.

In 2011, he was signed by English club Crystal Palace, where he was appointed club captain in 2012, captaining the club to promotion to the Premier League in 2013 as well as to the 2016 FA Cup final. In 2016, he joined Championship side Aston Villa, also helping them to achieve promotion back to the Premier League in 2019 before retiring.

Jedinak made his senior debut for the Australia national team in 2008. He went on to make 79 appearances for his country, serving as captain from 2014 until his international retirement in 2018. He represented Australia in the 2010, 2014 and 2018 FIFA World Cups. He has also played at two AFC Asian Cups, including captaining Australia to victory on home soil in the 2015 edition.

== Club career ==
Jedinak began playing when he was chosen to be part of the PDSSSC – a competition between Catholic schools within the Parramatta Diocesan – where he played for St Agnes Catholic High, the same school compatriot Željko Kalac attended. He also played for Loyola Senior High School, Mount Druitt in the Jesuit Cup. As captain, Jedinak led the team to success, winning the competition. He began his career at Sydney United, and spent some time in the early years of his career at Croatian club Varteks (later renamed Varaždin), making one competitive appearance for the Croatian side in a 2003–04 UEFA Cup qualifier against Levadia Maardu. He was part of the Sydney United side that won the NSW Premier League title for 2006, playing a role in midfield that earned him a trial with the Mariners.

=== Central Coast Mariners ===
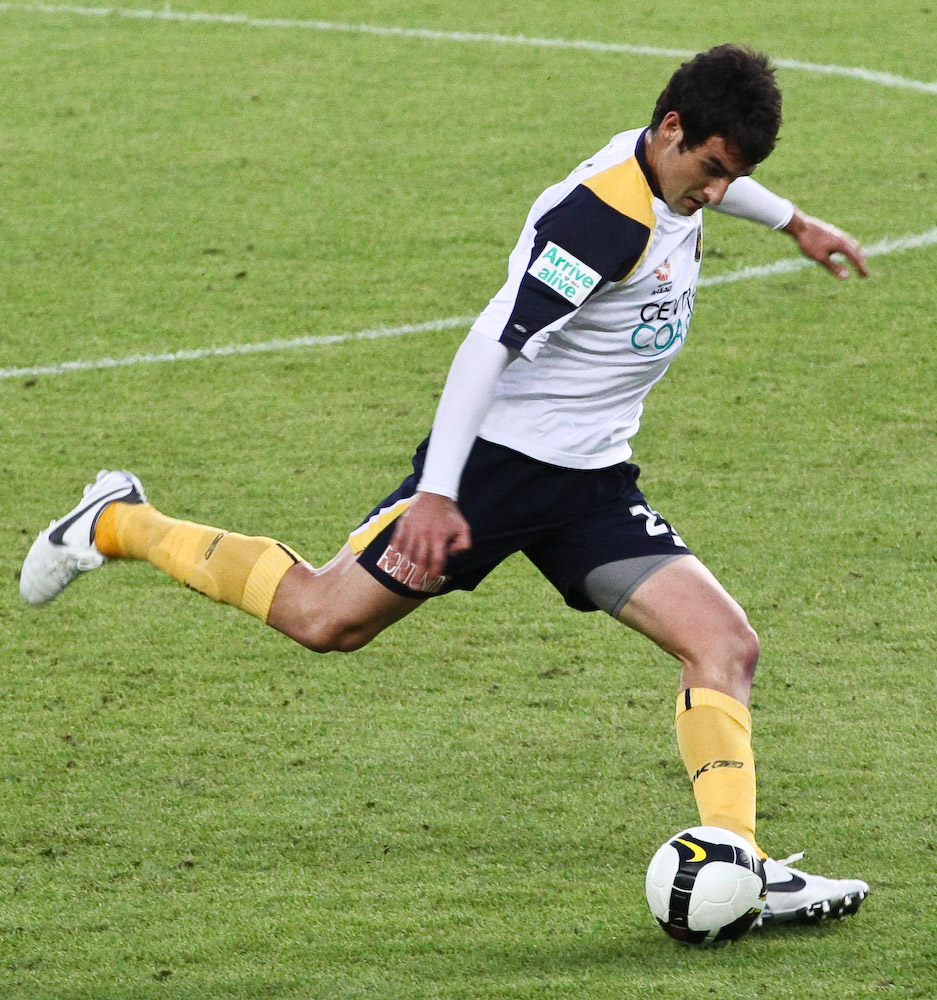
Jedinak playing for the Central Coast Mariners in 2008

Jedinak was first added to the Mariners' squad in the week leading up to their 2006 Pre-Season Cup play-off against Newcastle Jets, and subsequently was called into the squad for the last ten games of the 2006–07, where he made eight appearances.

Jedinak achieved success at the Central Coast Mariners, helping them to a Premiers' Plate in the 2007–08 season of the A-League and scoring some spectacular goals along the way including a 25-metre free-kick in the 5–4 loss in Round 15 to Sydney FC. He was the club's second highest goalscorer in the 2008–09 season, with six goals.

=== Gençlerbirliği ===
On 25 December 2008, Jedinak signed a two-and-a-half-year deal with Turkish club Gençlerbirliği effective January 2009. On 24 January 2009, he made his competitive debut for Gençlerbirliği in their 3–1 victory over Kayserispor, playing the full match. Jedinak's first goal for Gençlerbirliği was scored in a 1–0 win over Fenerbahçe.

=== Crystal Palace ===
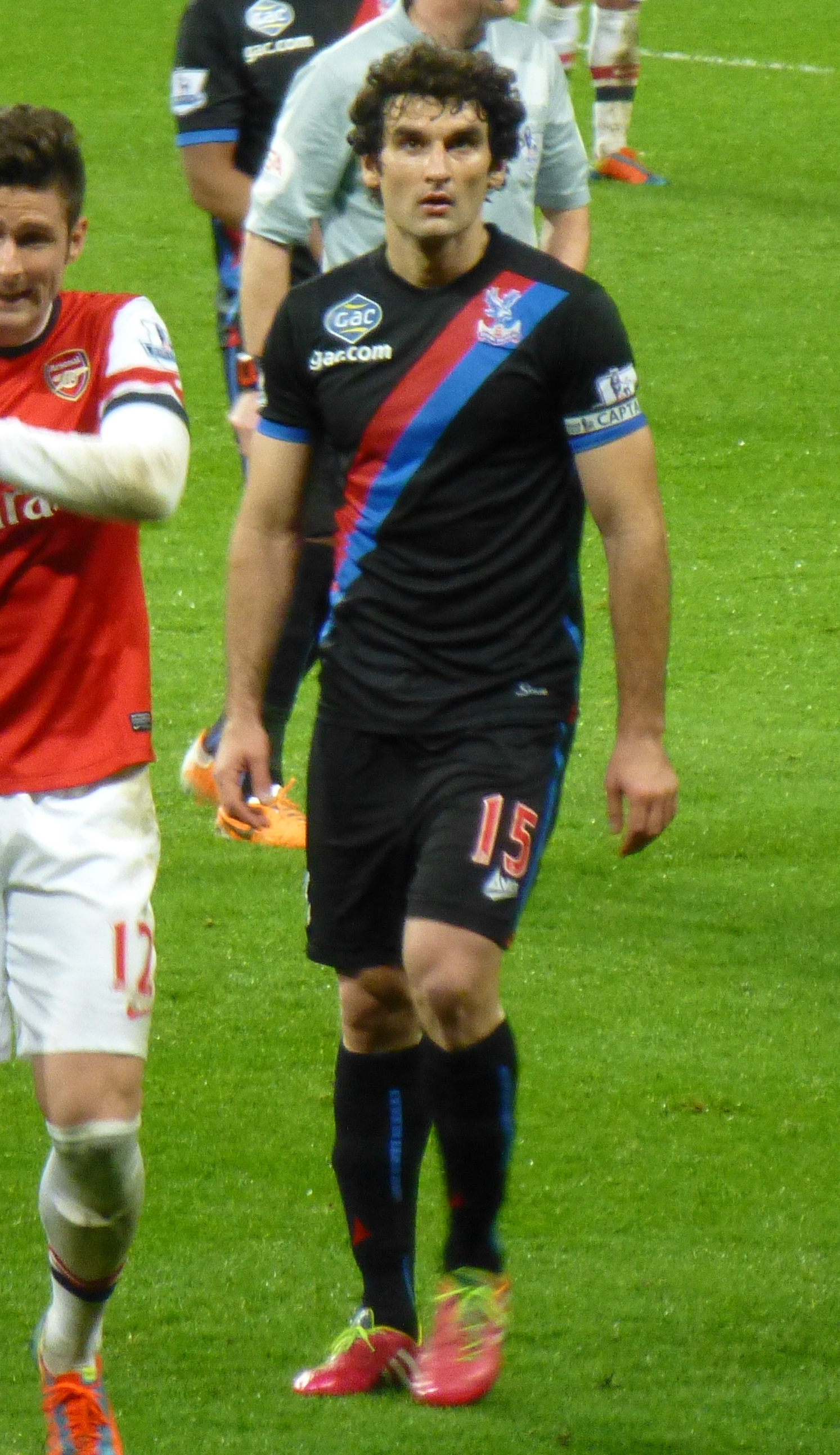
Jedinak playing for Crystal Palace in 2014

With one year remaining on his contract at Gençlerbirliği, Jedinak announced he was leaving the club in June 2011, with the hopes of finding a new club in a different country. A month later, he signed for Crystal Palace in England. Jedinak became a fans' favourite at Selhurst Park during the 2012–13 season. In light of regular club captain Paddy McCarthy's injury spell that season, Jedinak was handed the captain's armband first by manager Dougie Freedman and later by Ian Holloway. Jedinak scored an 89th-minute winner on the final day of the 2012–13 season in a 3–2 win against Peterborough United at Selhurst Park to secure a playoff place for Palace, then captained Palace to win the playoffs and gain promotion to the top-flight Premier League. Jedinak was voted Crystal Palace's 2012–13 player of the season.

On 3 December 2013, Jedinak signed a new three-and-a-half-year contract which was set to expire in the summer of 2017. He scored his first Premier League goal from a penalty kick against West Ham United in April 2014, choosing not to celebrate the goal to pay respect for compatriot Dylan Tombides, who was being honoured that match following his death. Jedinak came close to playing every minute of Palace's 2013–14 Premier League season (a rarity for an outfield player, even captains), but injured himself in the second half of the 2–2 draw with Fulham; he was replaced by Kagisho Dikgacoi with just over 30 minutes left to play.

On 28 October 2014, Jedinak was named the fifth-best player in Europe, the best midfielder in Europe and the best player in the Premier League after the first three months of the 2014–15 season by the website Oulala Fantasy Football based on Opta performance statistics, an accolade he brushed off as reported by Australian broadcaster Special Broadcasting Service. On 30 November, he was named as Asian International Footballer of the Year. Jedinak's superb freekick in a 3–1 win over Liverpool in November 2014 was voted Goal of the Season at the 2015 Crystal Palace FC Awards night.

Prior to the 2016–17 Premier League season, the club announced that Jedinak had resigned the captaincy and that Scott Dann would succeed him.

=== Aston Villa ===
New Aston Villa owner Tony Xia tweeted via his own Twitter account 'We'll officially announce one new signing at 5PM today' on 17 August 2016, in which it was later confirmed by the club at 5pm that Jedinak was Villa's latest acquisition and that he moved to the Championship club on a three-year deal. He made his debut for Aston Villa on 27 August 2016 in a 3–1 loss to Bristol City.

On 23 December 2017, Jedinak scored his first Villa goal in a 2–2 home draw with Sheffield United. The following 12 May, he headed the only goal of a play-off semi-final win at Middlesbrough. Two weeks later, in the final at Wembley, Villa lost 1–0 to Fulham, and Jedinak was substituted for the more attacking Josh Onomah with 13 minutes remaining.

On 14 May 2019 Jedinak came off the bench deep into extra time during Villa's playoff semi-final victory over Midlands rivals West Bromwich Albion. A specialist penalty taker with a 100% career record, Jedinak scored to put Aston Villa 2-0 ahead in the penalty shoot-out with Villa eventually running out 4-3 winners. He was an unused substitute two weeks later on 27 May as Aston Villa beat Derby County 2-1 at Wembley to secure a return to the Premier league.

Jedinak was released by Aston Villa at the end of the 2018–19 season.

In May 2020, Jedinak stated that he had not yet retired from professional football but, in July 2020, he announced his retirement from playing.

== International career ==
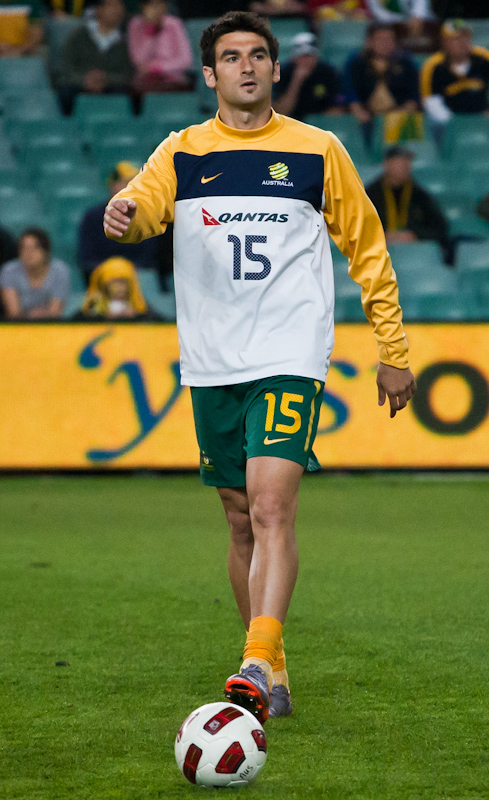
Jedinak representing Australia against Paraguay at the Sydney Football Stadium in October 2010

Jedinak played at the 2003 FIFA World Youth Championship in the United Arab Emirates, making appearances against the Czech Republic, Canada and the host nation.

Jedinak made his full international debut in a friendly against Singapore in early 2008 and was an integral squad member of Pim Verbeek's "Socceroos" in the lead up to the 2010 FIFA World Cup. Jedinak was included in Australia's 23-man squad for the 2010 World Cup and made his first appearance in Australia's opening match against Germany on 13 June. This, however, would be Jedinak's only involvement in the competition.

Jedinak scored his first international goal against South Korea at 2011 AFC Asian Cup. He went on to score his second international goal in the following match of the tournament against Bahrain.

In the absence of incumbent captain Lucas Neill, Jedinak was handed the captaincy for Australia's 4–3 friendly loss to Ecuador.

On 21 May 2014, Socceroos coach Ange Postecoglou appointed Jedinak as captain of the Australian national team to compete in the 2014 FIFA World Cup in Brazil, despite suffering an injury when playing in Crystal Palace's final match of the Premier League season. On 18 June, Jedinak scored from the penalty spot in Australia's 3–2 group stage defeat to the Netherlands in Porto Alegre.

Jedinak was named as captain of Australia for the 2015 AFC Asian Cup on home soil. He started in their first group game against Kuwait, scoring a penalty in the 62nd minute a 4–1 victory, but finished the game with an ankle injury. He returned to action in the knockout stages, and eventually lifted the trophy after the win over South Korea in the final.

After initially being named in Australia's squad for the 2017 FIFA Confederations Cup, Jedinak was later ruled out due to a groin strain aggravated in Australia's World Cup qualifier win against Saudi Arabia. He was replaced in the squad by James Jeggo. On 15 November 2017, Jedinak scored a hat-trick against Honduras to qualify Australia for the 2018 FIFA World Cup.

In May 2018 he was named in Australia's 23-man squad for the 2018 World Cup in Russia. On 16 June, he scored a penalty during a 2–1 defeat against France in Australia's opening match of the tournament, his second goal in a World Cup after scoring against the Netherlands in 2014. Jedinak scored another penalty against Denmark in the second group match on 21 June 2018, equalising the match and helping Australia get a point.

Jedinak retired from international football in October 2018. His 79 caps made him the ninth-most capped player for the country, and his 20 goals put him seventh amongst their all-time goalscorers.

== Coaching career ==
In March 2020, Jedinak was appointed to a coaching role with Aston Villa's academy. On 30 March 2021, he was appointed as Loan Development Coach at Aston Villa.

He was announced as an assistant coach at Tottenham Hotspur in June 2023, after his former Socceroos manager Ange Postecoglou was appointed as head coach there. In May 2024, he was one of twenty candidates issued a UEFA Pro Licence by the Football Association of Wales after completing a two-year course. On 12 June 2025, following Postecoglou's sacking, it was announced that Jedinak had departed his role at Tottenham.

On 10 September 2025, following Postecoglou's appointment as manager of Nottingham Forest, Jedinak was named assistant coach.

On 20 January 2026, Football Australia announced that Jedinak joined the Socceroos coaching set up as the third assistant coach.

== Personal life ==
Jedinak is married to Natalie Peacock and they have four sons.

As well as the name "Mile", a hypocorism of his given name, Michael, he is also colloquially known as "Jedi", shortened from "Jedinak". Due to that name's similarity to the group of Star Wars characters known as Jedi, he is often told "May the force be with you" and to "Use the force".

== Career statistics ==
=== Club ===
As of 3 August 2019

Appearances and goals by club, season and competition
Club	Season	League			Cup (Note: Includes FA Cup, League Cup and FA Community Shield.)		Continental		Other		Total	
Club	Season	Division	Apps	Goals	Apps	Goals	Apps	Goals	Apps	Goals	Apps	Goals
Sydney United	2000–01	NSL	3	0	—		—		—		3	0
Sydney United	2001–02	NSL	7	1	—		—		—		7	1
Sydney United	2002–03	NSL	18	2	—		—		—		18	2
Sydney United	2004–05	NSWPL	24	3	—		—		—		24	3
Sydney United	2006	NSWPL	30	6	—		—		—		30	6
Sydney United	Total		82	12	0	0	1	0	0	0	82	12
Varteks (loan)	2003–04	Prva HNL	—		—		1	0	—		1	0
Central Coast Mariners	2006–07	A-League	8	0	1	0	—		—		9	0
Central Coast Mariners	2007–08	A-League	22	2	5	0	—		—		27	2
Central Coast Mariners	2008–09	A-League	15	6	0	0	—		—		15	6
Central Coast Mariners	Total		45	8	6	0	—		—		51	8
Gençlerbirliği	2008–09	Süper Lig	15	1	—		—		—		15	1
Gençlerbirliği	2009–10	Süper Lig	2	0	—		—		—		2	0
Gençlerbirliği	2010–11	Süper Lig	21	3	3	1	—		—		24	4
Gençlerbirliği	Total		38	4	3	1	0	0	0	0	41	5
Antalyaspor (loan)	2009–10	Süper Lig	28	5	8	2	—		—		36	7
Crystal Palace	2011–12	Championship	31	1	4	0	—		—		35	1
Crystal Palace	2012–13	Championship	41	3	2	0	—		3 (Note: Appearances in Championship play-offs)	0	46	3
Crystal Palace	2013–14	Premier League	38	1	—		—		—		38	1
Crystal Palace	2014–15	Premier League	24	5	—		—		—		24	5
Crystal Palace	2015–16	Premier League	27	0	7	0	—		—		34	0
Crystal Palace	2016–17	Premier League	1	0	—		—		—		1	0
Crystal Palace	Total		162	10	13	0	0	0	3	0	178	10
Aston Villa	2016–17	Championship	33	0	1	0	—		—		34	0
Aston Villa	2017–18	Championship	25	1	—		—		3	1	28	2
Aston Villa	2018–19	Championship	17	0	0	0	0	0	1	0	18	0
Aston Villa	Total		75	1	1	0	0	0	4	1	80	2
Career total			421	39	31	1	1	0	7	1	457	43

=== International ===
Appearances and goals by national team and year
National team	Year	Apps	Goals
Australia	2008	3	0
Australia	2009	5	0
Australia	2010	9	0
Australia	2011	15	3
Australia	2012	5	0
Australia	2013	5	0
Australia	2014	10	3
Australia	2015	9	5
Australia	2016	7	4
Australia	2017	5	3
Australia	2018	6	2
Total		79	20

Scores and results list Australia's goal tally first, score column indicates score after each Jedinak goal.

List of international goals scored by Mile Jedinak
No.	Date	Venue	Opponent	Score	Result	Competition
1	15 January 2011	Thani bin Jassim Stadium, Al Rayyan, Qatar	South Korea	1–1	1–1	2011 AFC Asian Cup
2	18 January 2011	Jassim bin Hamad Stadium, Al Rayyan, Qatar	Bahrain	1–0	1–0	2011 AFC Asian Cup
3	11 October 2011	ANZ Stadium, Sydney, Australia	Oman	3–0	3–0	2014 FIFA World Cup qualification
4	5 March 2014	The Den, London, England	Ecuador	2–0	3–4	Friendly
5	18 June 2014	Estádio Beira-Rio, Porto Alegre, Brazil	Netherlands	2–1	2–3	2014 FIFA World Cup
6	8 September 2014	Craven Cottage, London, England	Saudi Arabia	2–0	3–2	Friendly
7	9 January 2015	Melbourne Rectangular Stadium, Melbourne, Australia	Kuwait	3–1	4–1	2015 AFC Asian Cup
8	25 March 2015	Fritz-Walter-Stadion, Kaiserslautern, Germany	Germany	2–1	2–2	Friendly
9	17 June 2015	Spartak Stadium, Bishkek, Kyrgyzstan	Kyrgyzstan	1–0	2–1	2018 FIFA World Cup qualification
10	12 November 2015	Canberra Stadium, Canberra, Australia	Kyrgyzstan	1–0	3–0	2018 FIFA World Cup qualification
11	17 November 2015	Bangabandhu National Stadium, Dhaka, Bangladesh	Bangladesh	4–0	4–0	2018 FIFA World Cup qualification
12	24 March 2016	Adelaide Oval, Adelaide, Australia	Tajikistan	2–0	7–0	2018 FIFA World Cup qualification
13	11 October 2016	Docklands Stadium, Melbourne, Australia	Japan	1–1	1–1	2018 FIFA World Cup qualification
14	15 November 2016	Rajamangala Stadium, Bangkok, Thailand	Thailand	1–0	2–2	2018 FIFA World Cup qualification
15	15 November 2016	Rajamangala Stadium, Bangkok, Thailand	Thailand	2–2	2–2	2018 FIFA World Cup qualification
16	15 November 2017	Stadium Australia, Sydney, Australia	Honduras	1–0	3–1	2018 FIFA World Cup qualification
17	15 November 2017	Stadium Australia, Sydney, Australia	Honduras	2–0	3–1	2018 FIFA World Cup qualification
18	15 November 2017	Stadium Australia, Sydney, Australia	Honduras	3–0	3–1	2018 FIFA World Cup qualification
19	16 June 2018	Kazan Arena, Kazan, Russia	France	1–1	1–2	2018 FIFA World Cup
20	21 June 2018	Cosmos Arena, Samara, Russia	Denmark	1–1	1–1	2018 FIFA World Cup

== Honours ==
Sydney United

- NSW Premier League: 2006

Central Coast Mariners

- A-League Premiership: 2007–08

Crystal Palace

- Football League Championship play-offs: 2013
- FA Cup runner-up: 2015–16

Aston Villa

- EFL Championship play-offs: 2019

Australia

- AFC Asian Cup: 2015; runner-up 2011

Individual

- Mariners Medal: 2007–08
- PFA A-League Team of the Season: 2008–09
- Crystal Palace Player of the Year: 2012–13
- FFA Male footballer of the Year: 2013, 2014
- AFC Asian International Player of the Year: 2014
- PFA Footballer of the Year: 2013–14
- AFC Opta All-time XI at the FIFA World Cup: 2020
- IFFHS Asian Men's Team of All Time: 2021

Sporting positions
Preceded by Paddy McCarthy	Captain of Crystal Palace; 2012–2016	Succeeded by Scott Dann
