= 2024 K League 1 =

42nd season of the top division of professional football in South Korea

Hana Bank K League 1
- Season: 2024
- Dates: 1 March – 24 November 2024
- Champions: Ulsan HD (5th title)
- Relegated: Incheon United
- Champions League Elite: Ulsan HD; Gangwon FC; FC Seoul
- Champions League Two: Pohang Steelers
- Matches: 228
- Goals: 596 (2.61 per match)
- Best player: Jo Hyeon-woo
- Top goalscorer: Stefan Mugoša (15 goals)
- Biggest home win: Suwon FC 5–0 Jeju (25 August)
- Biggest away win: Suwon FC 0–6 Jeonbuk (14 September)
- Highest scoring: Ulsan 5–4 Pohang (31 August)
- Longest winning run: 6 matches Gangwon FC
- Longest unbeaten run: 6 matches Pohang Steelers
- Longest winless run: 8 matches Incheon United; Jeonbuk Hyundai Motors
- Longest losing run: 6 matches Gwangju FC; Pohang Steelers
- Highest attendance: 52,600; Seoul 0–1 Ulsan (4 May)
- Lowest attendance: 1,085; Gimcheon 2–3 Suwon FC (9 July)
- Total attendance: 2,524,673
- Average attendance: 11,073
- All statistics correct as of 24 November 2024.

The 2024 K League 1, also known as the Hana Bank K League 1 for sponsorship reasons, is the 42nd season of the top division of professional football in South Korea, and the twelfth season of the K League 1. Ulsan HD defended their title for the second consecutive year.

== Teams ==
=== Team changes ===
Gimcheon Sangmu were promoted from the 2023 K League 2 after a one-year absence from the top flight. Suwon Samsung Bluewings were relegated to 2024 K League 2 in the club's first absence from the top flight of Korean football.

▲ Promoted from K League 2	▼ Relegated to K League 2
Gimcheon Sangmu	Suwon Samsung Bluewings

=== Locations ===
Locations of the 2024 K League 1 teams

The following twelve clubs are competing in the 2024 K League 1.

Team	City/Province	Abbreviation
Daegu FC	Daegu	Daegu
Daejeon Hana Citizen	Daejeon	Daejeon
Gangwon FC	Gangwon	Gangwon
Gimcheon Sangmu	Gimcheon	Gimcheon
Gwangju FC	Gwangju	Gwangju
Incheon United	Incheon	Incheon
Jeju United	Jeju	Jeju
Jeonbuk Hyundai Motors	Jeonbuk	Jeonbuk
Pohang Steelers	Pohang	Pohang
FC Seoul	Seoul	Seoul
Suwon FC	Suwon	Suwon FC
Ulsan HD	Ulsan	Ulsan

=== Stadiums ===
Daegu FC	Daejeon Hana Citizen	Gimcheon Sangmu
DGB Daegu Bank Park	Daejeon World Cup Stadium	Gimcheon Stadium
Capacity: **12,415**	Capacity: **40,903**	Capacity: **25,000**
Gangwon FC		Gwangju FC
Chuncheon Songam Leports Town	Gangneung Stadium	Gwangju Football Stadium
Capacity: **20,000**	Capacity: **22,333**	Capacity: **10,007**
Incheon United	Jeju United	Jeonbuk Hyundai Motors
Incheon Football Stadium	Jeju World Cup Stadium	Jeonju World Cup Stadium
Capacity: **20,891**	Capacity: **29,791**	Capacity: **42,477**
Pohang Steelers	FC Seoul	Suwon FC
Pohang Steel Yard	Seoul World Cup Stadium	Suwon Stadium
Capacity: **17,443**	Capacity: **66,704**	Capacity: **11,808**
Ulsan HD		
Ulsan Munsu Football Stadium		
Capacity: **44,102**		

=== Personnel and sponsoring ===
Team	Manager	Kit manufacturer	Main sponsor	Other sponsor(s)
Daegu FC	(South Korea) Park Chang-hyun	Goal Studio	iM Bank	List: Front: None; Back: Daegu Haany University, Daeguro; Sleeves: Powerful Daegu; Shorts: None
Daejeon Hana Citizen	(South Korea) Hwang Sun-hong	Puma	Hana Bank	List: Front: Hana Capital; Back: Hana Securities, Hana Card, Hana Life; Sleeves: Hana Savings Bank, CNCITY Energy, Gyeryong Construction, Hana Insurance, Daejeon First-Class Economic City; Shorts: None
Gangwon FC	(South Korea) Yoon Jong-hwan	Fila	High1 Resort	List: Front: None; Back: Gangwon Hanwoo; Sleeves: Kangwon Land, Gangwon State; Shorts: None
Gimcheon Sangmu	(South Korea) Chung Jung-yong	Kelme	Happy Gimcheon	List: Front: Nonghyup Bank; Back: Neo Tech, DGB Financial Group, North Gyeongsang Province; Sleeves: Aju Steel, Shine Muscat, Gimcheon; Shorts: None
Gwangju FC	(South Korea) Lee Jung-hyo	Kelme	Kwangju Bank	List: Front: None; Back: None; Sleeves: Parangsae Eye Clinic, Gwangju City; Shorts: Namhai Honnête
Incheon United	(South Korea) Choi Yung-keun	Macron	IFEZ	List: Front: All Ways Incheon, Ddangyo, Shinhan Bank; Back: None; Sleeves: 2025 APEC Incheon, Incheon; Shorts: None
Jeju United	(South Korea) Kim Hak-bum	Fila	SK Energy	List: Front: Jeju, SK Muffin; Back: Jeju Samdasoo; Sleeves: EnClean Solux Plus+, Only Jeju; Shorts: None
Jeonbuk Hyundai Motors	(South Korea) Kim Do-heon	Adidas	Hyundai N	List: Front: Hyundai Motors; Back: Hyundai N, Hyundai Motors/Kumho Tire; Sleeves: Jeonbuk State, Hyundai Ioniq 5 N/Hyundai Avante N; Shorts: None
Pohang Steelers	(South Korea) Park Tae-ha	Puma	POSCO	List: Front: Pohang, POSCO (away); Back: Lashevan, POSCO E&C; Sleeves: Pohang; Shorts: None
FC Seoul	(South Korea) Kim Gi-dong	Pro-Specs	Xi (home); GS Caltex (away)	List: Front: TMON; Back: Shinhan SOL Pay, GS Caltex; Sleeves: KEF, Seoul My Soul, GS25; Shorts: None
Suwon FC	(South Korea) Kim Eun-jung	Hummel	Suwon Special City	List: Front: None; Back: Industrial Bank of Korea; Sleeves: Kiko Luggage, Suwon Special City; Shorts: None
Ulsan HD	(South Korea) Kim Pan-gon	Adidas	HD Hyundai	List: Front: Ulsan, the city of dreams, Ulsan, the corporate city; Back: HD Hyundai Oilbank Kazen; Sleeves: BNK Kyongnam Bank, Develon, Ulsan; Shorts: None

=== Managerial changes ===
Team	Outgoing manager	Manner of departure	Date of vacancy	Table	Replaced by	Date of appointment
Jeju United	(South Korea) Jung Jo-gook (caretaker)	End of interim spell	5 December 2023	Pre-season	(South Korea) Kim Hak-bum	5 December 2023
Jeonbuk Hyundai Motors	(Romania) Dan Petrescu	Mutual consent	6 April 2024	12th	(South Korea) Kim Do-heon	27 May 2024
Daegu FC	(South Korea) Choi Won-kwon	Resigned	19 April 2024	11th	(South Korea) Park Chang-hyun	23 April 2024
Daejeon Hana Citizen	(South Korea) Lee Min-sung	Resigned	21 May 2024	12th	(South Korea) Hwang Sun-hong	3 June 2024
Incheon United	(South Korea) Jo Sung-hwan	Mutual consent	6 July 2024	9th	(South Korea) Choi Yung-keun	1 August 2024
Ulsan HD	(South Korea) Hong Myung-bo	Signed by South Korea	11 July 2024	3rd	(South Korea) Kim Pan-gon	28 July 2024

=== Foreign players ===
The number of allowed foreign players was kept strictly to six per team, including a guaranteed slot for a player from the Asian Football Confederation countries. Teams could field at most five foreign players at any given time, including at least one player from the AFC confederation.

As a military-owned team, Gimcheon Sangmu are not allowed to sign any foreign players.

North Korean player An Byong-jun, who played for Suwon FC, was deemed as a native player by South Korean nationality law.

Players in bold were registered during the mid-season transfer window.

Team	Player 1	Player 2	Player 3	Player 4	Player 5	AFC player	Former player(s) (Note: Left their respective clubs during the mid-season transfer window.)
Daegu FC	(Brazil) **Caio Marcelo**	(Brazil) Césinha	(Brazil) Edgar	(Brazil) **Ítalo**	(Brazil) Lucas Barcellos	(Japan) Kyohei Yoshino	(Brazil) Victor Bobsin
Daejeon Hana Citizen	(Australia) Aaron Calver	(Azerbaijan) Anton Kryvotsyuk	(Brazil) **Kelvin**	(Brazil) **Victor Bobsin**	(Latvia) Vladislavs Gutkovskis	(Japan) **Masatoshi Ishida**	(Brazil) Farley Rosa (Brazil) Leandro Ribeiro (Togo) Peniel Mlapa
Gangwon FC	(Bosnia and Herzegovina) **Irfan Hadžić**	(Brazil) Vitor Gabriel	(Croatia) **Franko Kovačević**	(Montenegro) Marko Tući		(Australia) **Henry Hore**	(Brazil) Jefferson Galego (Brazil) Welinton Júnior (Brazil) Yago Cariello (Japan) Yuta Kamiya
Gwangju FC	(Albania) Jasir Asani	(Brazil) Bruno Oliveira	(Brazil) Gabriel Tigrão	(Brazil) João Magno	(Georgia (country)) Beka Mikeltadze		(Australia) Alexandar Popovic
Incheon United	(Croatia) Matej Jonjić	(Democratic Republic of the Congo) Paul-José M'Poku	(Guinea-Bissau) Gerso Fernandes	(Montenegro) Stefan Mugoša		(Australia) Harrison Delbridge	
Jeju United	(Brazil) Italo	(Brazil) **Jefferson Galego**	(Brazil) Reis	(Brazil) Yuri		(Japan) **Kaina Yoshio**	(Brazil) Tales
Jeonbuk Hyundai Motors	(Brazil) **Andrigo**	(Brazil) Hernandes Rodrigues	(Brazil) Tiago Orobó	(Ghana) Nana Boateng			(Brazil) Marcus Vinícius (Czech Republic) Tomáš Petrášek
Pohang Steelers	(Brazil) Jorge Teixeira	(Brazil) Oberdan	(Brazil) Wanderson			(Australia) Jonathan Aspropotamitis	
FC Seoul	(Brazil) **Lucas Rodrigues**	(Brazil) Willyan	(England) Jesse Lingard	(Portugal) **Ronaldo Tavares**	(Russia) Stanislav Iljutcenko	(Jordan) **Yazan Al-Arab**	(Iraq) Rebin Sulaka (Japan) Takuya Shigehiro (Serbia) Aleksandar Paločević
Suwon FC	(Albania) **Eljon Sota**	(Australia) Lachlan Jackson	(Brazil) Anderson Oliveira			(Indonesia) Pratama Arhan	(Brazil) Matheus Trindade (Chile) Josepablo Monreal
Ulsan HD	(Brazil) Matheus Sales	(Brazil) **Yago Cariello**	(Georgia (country)) **Giorgi Arabidze**	(Sweden) Darijan Bojanić	(Sweden) Gustav Ludwigson	(Japan) Ataru Esaka	(Brazil) Kelvin (Hungary) Martin Ádám

== League table ==
Pos	Team	Pld	W	D	L	GF	GA	GD	Pts	Qualification or relegation (Note: Teams played each other three times (33 matches), before the league was split into two groups, the top six and the bottom six.)
1	Ulsan HD (C)	38	21	9	8	62	40	+22	72	Qualification for Champions League Elite league stage
2	Gangwon FC	38	19	7	12	62	56	+6	64	Qualification for Champions League Elite league stage
3	Gimcheon Sangmu (Note: Military-owned team Gimcheon Sangmu cannot qualify for AFC competitions.)	38	18	9	11	55	41	+14	63	
4	FC Seoul	38	16	10	12	55	42	+13	58	Qualification for Champions League Elite league stage
5	Suwon FC	38	15	8	15	54	57	−3	53	
6	Pohang Steelers	38	14	11	13	53	50	+3	53	Qualification for Champions League Two group stage (Note: Qualified as Korea Cup champions.)
7	Jeju United	38	15	4	19	38	54	−16	49	
8	Daejeon Hana Citizen	38	12	12	14	43	47	−4	48	
9	Gwangju FC	38	14	5	19	42	49	−7	47	
10	Jeonbuk Hyundai Motors (O)	38	10	12	16	49	59	−10	42	Qualification for relegation play-offs
11	Daegu FC (O)	38	9	13	16	45	52	−7	40	Qualification for relegation play-offs
12	Incheon United (R)	38	9	12	17	38	49	−11	39	Relegation to K League 2

Source: Soccerway K League
Rules for classification: 1) Points; 2) Goals scored; 3) Goal difference; 4) Wins; 5) Head-to-head points
(C) Champions; (O) Play-off winners; (R) Relegated

== Positions by matchday ==
Leaders, qualification for Champions League Elite league stage
Qualification for Champions League Elite play-off round
Qualification for Champions League Two group stage
Qualification for relegation play-offs
Relegation to K League 2

=== Round 1–33 ===
Team ╲ Round	1	2	3	4	5	6	7	8	9	10	11	12	13	14	15	16	17	18	19	20	21	22	23	24	25	26	27	28	29	30	31	32	33
Ulsan HD	2	2	1	3	3	3	3	2	3	2	2	2	3	1	2	1	1	1	1	2	2	3	2	3	4	3	3	2	2	1	1	1	1
Gimcheon Sangmu	2	6	4	1	2	2	2	2	1	3	3	3	2	3	3	2	4	3	2	1	1	2	1	2	1	2	2	4	4	3	2	2	2
Gangwon FC	5	8	8	10	8	5	5	4	5	6	4	5	5	4	4	4	2	4	4	4	4	4	4	4	2	1	1	1	1	2	3	3	3
Pohang Steelers	9	5	3	2	1	1	1	1	2	1	1	1	1	2	1	3	3	2	3	3	3	1	3	1	3	4	4	6	6	6	5	4	4
FC Seoul	12	11	7	7	4	6	6	7	9	7	9	6	8	9	8	9	9	7	6	6	6	6	6	6	6	6	6	5	5	5	6	5	5
Suwon FC	2	4	5	6	9	9	8	5	4	4	5	4	4	5	5	5	5	5	5	5	5	5	5	5	5	5	5	3	3	4	4	6	6
Gwangju FC	1	1	2	4	7	8	9	6	12	11	8	9	7	8	9	7	6	6	8	7	8	7	8	7	7	7	7	7	7	7	7	7	7
Jeju United	5	3	6	8	6	4	4	6	8	9	7	8	10	7	6	6	8	10	7	8	7	8	7	8	8	8	8	8	8	8	8	8	8
Daegu FC	9	12	12	8	11	11	11	10	11	12	12	11	9	11	11	12	10	9	10	10	10	10	10	11	10	11	11	9	12	11	11	10	9
Jeonbuk Hyundai Motors	5	7	11	11	12	12	10	8	6	8	10	12	11	10	10	10	11	12	12	12	12	11	11	10	11	12	12	10	11	10	10	9	10
Daejeon Hana Citizen	5	9	10	12	10	10	12	12	10	10	11	10	12	12	12	11	12	11	11	11	11	12	12	12	12	10	10	11	9	9	9	11	11
Incheon United	9	10	9	5	5	7	7	9	7	5	6	7	6	6	7	8	7	8	9	9	9	9	9	9	9	9	9	12	10	12	12	12	12

Updated to match(es) played on 6 October 2024. Source: K League

=== Round 34–38 ===
Team ╲ Round	34	35	36	37	38
Ulsan HD	1	1	1	1	1
Gangwon FC	2	2	2	3	2
Gimcheon Sangmu	3	3	3	2	3
FC Seoul	5	4	4	4	4
Suwon FC	6	6	6	6	5
Pohang Steelers	4	5	5	5	6
Jeju United	8	7	7	7	7
Daejeon Hana Citizen	10	9	9	9	8
Gwangju FC	7	8	8	8	9
Jeonbuk Hyundai Motors	11	11	11	10	10
Daegu FC	9	10	10	11	11
Incheon United	12	12	12	12	12

Source: K League

== Results ==
=== Matches 1–22 ===
Teams played each other twice, once at home, once away.

Home \ Away	USH	GCS	GWN	PHS	SEL	SWN	GJU	JJU	JHM	DGU	DHC	ICU
Ulsan HD	—	2–2	4–0	1–0	2–2	3–0	0–1	3–1	1–0	1–0	4–1	3–3
Gimcheon Sangmu	2–3	—	1–0	3–1	0–0	2–3	2–1	1–0	1–0	2–0	2–0	2–2
Gangwon FC	1–0	2–3	—	2–4	1–1	3–1	2–0	1–1	2–1	3–0	3–3	4–1
Pohang Steelers	2–1	0–0	2–0	—	2–2	1–1	1–0	1–1	1–0	3–1	1–1	0–0
FC Seoul	0–1	5–1	2–0	2–4	—	3–0	1–2	2–0	2–3	1–2	2–1	0–0
Suwon FC	1–1	1–4	1–2	1–0	0–2	—	1–0	2–1	1–1	2–0	1–0	3–1
Gwangju FC	2–1	2–0	4–2	0–1	2–0	1–2	—	2–1	0–3	1–2	2–1	2–3
Jeju United	2–3	0–2	1–2	0–2	3–2	1–0	1–3	—	2–0	1–0	3–1	1–0
Jeonbuk Hyundai Motors	2–2	0–0	2–3	1–1	1–5	2–3	2–1	2–1	—	2–2	1–1	2–2
Daegu FC	1–2	0–1	1–2	3–3	0–0	1–1	3–2	1–0	3–0	—	0–0	0–0
Daejeon Hana Citizen	2–0	0–0	1–1	1–2	3–1	0–2	2–1	0–1	2–2	1–0	—	0–1
Incheon United	1–1	1–1	0–1	1–3	1–2	0–1	1–1	0–1	3–0	1–1	2–0	—

Source: K League
Legend: Blue = home team win; Yellow = draw; Red = away team win.

Matchday 1 (1–3 March)
1 March 2024
14:00 UTC+9

Ulsan HD	1–0	Pohang Steelers
Esaka 51'

Ulsan Munsu Football Stadium, Ulsan
Attendance: 28,683
Referee: Kim Woo-sung
1 March 2024
16:30 UTC+9

Jeonbuk Hyundai Motors	1–1	Daejeon Hana Citizen
Ahn Hyeon-beom 86'		Gutkovskis 11'

Jeonju World Cup Stadium, Jeonju
Attendance: 24,758
Referee: Jeong Dong-sik
2 March 2024
14:00 UTC+9

Gwangju FC	2–0	FC Seoul
Lee Hee-gyun 21'; Gabriel 90+5'

Gwangju Football Stadium, Gwangju
Attendance: 7,805
Referee: Park Byeong-jin
2 March 2024
16:30 UTC+9

Gangwon FC	1–1	Jeju United
Lee Sang-heon 1'		Italo 44'

Chuncheon Songam Sports Town, Chuncheon
Attendance: 6,021
Referee: Ko Hyung-jin
2 March 2024
16:30 UTC+9

Incheon United	0–1	Suwon FC
		Lee Seung-woo 90+10' (pen.)

Incheon Football Stadium, Incheon
Attendance: 15,060
Referee: Shin Yong-jun
3 March 2024
14:00 UTC+9

Daegu FC	0–1	Gimcheon Sangmu
		Won Du-jae 78'

DGB Daegu Bank Park, Daegu
Attendance: 12,133
Referee: Kim Dae-yong

Matchday 2 (9–10 March)
9 March 2024
14:00 UTC+9

Suwon FC	1–1	Jeonbuk Hyundai Motors
Lee Seung-woo 47'		Tiago 54'

Suwon Sports Complex, Suwon
Attendance: 9,557
Referee: Chae Sang-hyeop
9 March 2024
16:30 UTC+9

Pohang Steelers	3–1	Daegu FC
Jeon Min-gwang 49'; Kim In-sung 53'; Kim Jong-woo 73'		Hong Chul 45+1'

Pohang Steel Yard, Pohang
Attendance: 10,946
Referee: Park Byeong-jin
9 March 2024
16:30 UTC+9

Gimcheon Sangmu	2–3	Ulsan HD
Kim Hyeon-ug 58' (pen.), 61'		Lee Dong-gyeong 17', 26'; Jang Si-young 29'

Gimcheon Stadium, Gimcheon
Attendance: 5,848
Referee: Kim Yong-woo
10 March 2024
14:00 UTC+9

Jeju United	3–1	Daejeon Hana Citizen
Yuri 39' (pen.), 45+6' (pen.); Jin Seong-uk 65'		Rosa 88'

Jeju World Cup Stadium, Seogwipo, Jeju Province
Attendance: 9,083
Referee: Lee Dong-jun
10 March 2024
16:00 UTC+9

FC Seoul	0–0	Incheon United

Seoul World Cup Stadium, Seoul
Attendance: 51,670
Referee: Kim Jong-hyeok
10 March 2024
16:30 UTC+9

Gwangju FC	4–2	Gangwon FC
Gabriel 49', 74'; Lee Kun-hee 62'; Choi Kyoung-rok 90+8' (pen.)		Yang Min-hyeok 2'; Lee Sang-heon 67' (pen.)

Gwangju Football Stadium, Gwangju
Attendance: 5,786
Referee: Choi Hyeon-jae

Matchday 3 (16–17 March)
16 March 2024
14:00 UTC+9

Daejeon Hana Citizen	1–1	Gangwon FC
Mlapa 87'		Yun Suk-young 62'

Daejeon World Cup Stadium, Daejeon
Attendance: 17,191
Referee: Shin Yong-jun
16 March 2024
16:30 UTC+9

Daegu FC	1–1	Suwon FC
Yoshino 25'		Jung Jae-min 90+5'

DGB Daegu Bank Park, Daegu
Attendance: 11,997
Referee: Kim Hee-gon
16 March 2024
16:30 UTC+9

FC Seoul	2–0	Jeju United
Iljutcenko 20' (pen.); Ki Sung-yueng 24'

Seoul World Cup Stadium, Seoul
Attendance: 29,536
Referee: Kim Dae-yong
17 March 2024
14:00 UTC+9

Gimcheon Sangmu	1–0	Jeonbuk Hyundai Motors
Kim Hyeon-ug 25'

Gimcheon Stadium, Gimcheon
Attendance: 4,300
Referee: Kim Woo-sung
17 March 2024
14:00 UTC+9

Pohang Steelers	1–0	Gwangju FC
Jeong Jae-hee 90+4'

Pohang Steel Yard, Pohang
Attendance: 9,203
Referee: Ko Hyung-jin
17 March 2024
16:30 UTC+9

Ulsan HD	3–3	Incheon United
Ádám 33', 63'; Lee Dong-gyeong 53'		Mugoša 39', 74' (pen.); Park Seung-ho 48'

Ulsan Munsu Football Stadium, Ulsan
Attendance: 15,233
Referee: Park Byeong-jin

Matchday 4 (30–31 March)
30 March 2024
14:00 UTC+9

Incheon United	2–0	Daejeon Hana Citizen
Gerso 38'; Lee Jeong-taek 47' (o.g.)

Incheon Football Stadium, Incheon
Attendance: 11,581
Referee: Kim Yong-woo
30 March 2024
14:00 UTC+9

Jeonbuk Hyundai Motors	2–2	Ulsan HD
Lee Dong-jun 45+2'; Moon Seon-min 70'		Lee Dong-gyeong 22'; Kim Ji-hyeon 40'

Jeonju World Cup Stadium, Jeonju
Attendance: 25,872
Referee: Lee Dong-jun
30 March 2024
16:30 UTC+9

Jeju United	0–2	Pohang Steelers
		Jeong Jae-hee 90+2'; Baek Sung-dong 90+6'

Jeju World Cup Stadium, Seogwipo, Jeju Province
Attendance: 6,036
Referee: Kim Jong-hyeok
30 March 2024
16:30 UTC+9

Suwon FC	1–4	Gimcheon Sangmu
Ji Dong-won 89'		Kim Hyeon-ug 8'; Lee Joong-min 23', 31'; Yu Kang-hyun 90+3' (pen.)

Suwon Sports Complex, Suwon
Attendance: 6,145
Referee: Kim Dae-yong
31 March 2024
14:00 UTC+9

Gangwon FC	1–1	FC Seoul
Lee Sang-heon 86'		Willyan 72'

Chuncheon Songam Sports Town, Chuncheon
Attendance: 10,144
Referee: Kim Hee-gon
31 March 2024
16:30 UTC+9

Gwangju FC	1–2	Daegu FC
Moon Min-seo 25' (pen.)		Yoshino 45+5'; Edgar 77'

Gwangju Football Stadium, Gwangju
Attendance: 7,313
Referee: Chae Sang-hyeop

Matchday 5 (2–3 April)
2 April 2024
19:30 UTC+9

Pohang Steelers	1–1	Suwon FC
Oberdan 45'		Jackson 53'

Pohang Steel Yard, Pohang
Attendance: 5,143
Referee: Shin Yong-jun
2 April 2024
19:30 UTC+9

Daejeon Hana Citizen	2–0	Ulsan HD
Leandro 49'; Kim In-kyun 60'

Daejeon World Cup Stadium, Daejeon
Attendance: 7,927
Referee: Ko Hyung-jin
3 April 2024
19:30 UTC+9

Jeju United	2–0	Jeonbuk Hyundai Motors
Yeo Hong-gyu 29'; Jin Seong-uk 90+8'

Jeju World Cup Stadium, Seogwipo, Jeju Province
Attendance: 3,426
Referee: Kim Woo-sung
3 April 2024
19:30 UTC+9

Gangwon FC	3–0	Daegu FC
Yun Suk-Young 14'; Lee Sang-heon 65', 90+1'

Chuncheon Songam Sports Town, Chuncheon
Attendance: 3,056
Referee: Park Byeong-jin
3 April 2024
19:30 UTC+9

Gwangju FC	2–3	Incheon United
Gabriel 67'; Lee Hee-gyun 78'		Park Seung-ho 33'; Mugoša 50'; Gerso 90+7'

Gwangju Football Stadium, Gwangju
Attendance: 1,562
Referee: Kim Dae-yong
3 April 2024
19:30 UTC+9

FC Seoul	5–1	Gimcheon Sangmu
Cho Young-wook 16'; Iljutcenko 34', 39'; Lim Sang-hyub 45+2'; Park Dong-jin 80'		Kim Min-jun 52'

Seoul World Cup Stadium, Seoul
Attendance: 13,040
Referee: Jeong Dong-sik

Matchday 6 (6–7 April)
6 April 2024
14:00 UTC+9

Ulsan HD	3–0	Suwon FC
Lee Dong-gyeong 18'; Ludwigson 64'; Joo Min-kyu 90+6'

Ulsan Munsu Football Stadium, Ulsan
Attendance: 14,125
Referee: Chae Sang-hyeop
6 April 2024
16:30 UTC+9

Gimcheon Sangmu	2–1	Gwangju FC
Jung Chi-in 45+3', 58' (pen.)		Gabriel 7'

Gimcheon Stadium, Gimcheon
Attendance: 2,978
Referee: Kim Jong-hyeok
6 April 2024
16:30 UTC+9

Incheon United	0–1	Jeju United
		Yuri 69'

Incheon Football Stadium, Incheon
Attendance: 9,293
Referee: Kim Hee-gon
7 April 2024
14:00 UTC+9

Jeonbuk Hyundai Motors	2–3	Gangwon FC
Kim Tae-hwan 45+7' (pen.); Moon Seon-min 90+8'		Lee Sang-heon 42' (pen.), 74'; Tući 69'

Jeonju World Cup Stadium, Jeonju
Attendance: 11,125
Referee: Choi Hyeon-jae
7 April 2024
14:00 UTC+9

Daegu FC	0–0	FC Seoul

DGB Daegu Bank Park, Daegu
Attendance: 12,088
Referee: Kim Yong-woo
7 April 2024
16:30 UTC+9

Daejeon Hana Citizen	1–2	Pohang Steelers
Leandro 46'		Kim In-sung 82'; Jeong Jae-hee 90+2'

Daejeon World Cup Stadium, Daejeon
Attendance: 10,761
Referee: Lee Dong-jun

Matchday 7 (13–14 April)
13 April 2024
14:00 UTC+9

Jeonbuk Hyundai Motors	2–1	Gwangju FC
Lee Jae-ik 18'; Song Min-kyu 90+1'		Lee Kun-hee 83'

Jeonju World Cup Stadium, Jeonju
Attendance: 11,229
Referee: Chae Sang-hyeop
13 April 2024
14:00 UTC+9

FC Seoul	2–4	Pohang Steelers
Son Seung-beom 45+2'; Willyan 65'		Heo Yong-joon 15'; Lee Ho-jae 73'; Park Chan-yong 77'; Jeong Jae-hee 90+4'

Seoul World Cup Stadium, Seoul
Attendance: 29,051
Referee: Kim Jong-hyeok
13 April 2024
16:30 UTC+9

Jeju United	0–2	Gimcheon Sangmu
		Kim Hyeon-ug 35'; Kang Hyun-muk 45+4'

Jeju World Cup Stadium, Seogwipo, Jeju Province
Attendance: 4,211
Referee: Shin Yong-jun
13 April 2024
16:30 UTC+9

Ulsan HD	4–0	Gangwon FC
Joo Min-kyu 9', 61'; Lee Dong-gyeong 43'; Um Won-sang 55'

Ulsan Munsu Football Stadium, Ulsan
Attendance: 13,874
Referee: Kim Dae-yong
14 April 2024
14:00 UTC+9

Suwon FC	1–0	Daejeon Hana Citizen
Lee Jae-won 51'

Suwon Sports Complex, Suwon
Attendance: 4,961
Referee: Park Byeong-jin
14 April 2024
16:30 UTC+9

Incheon United	1–1	Daegu FC
Kim Dong-min 22'		Yoshino 54'

Incheon Football Stadium, Incheon
Attendance: 9,400
Referee: Lee Dong-jun

Matchday 8 (20–21 April, 15 May)
20 April 2024
14:00 UTC+9

Suwon FC	2–1	Jeju United
Lee Yong 62'; Lee Seung-woo 90' (pen.)		Yeo Hong-gyu 11'

Suwon Sports Complex, Suwon
Attendance: 2,522
Referee: Choi Hyeon-jae
20 April 2024
16:30 UTC+9

Pohang Steelers	0–0	Gimcheon Sangmu

Pohang Steel Yard, Pohang
Attendance: 7,673
Referee: Chae Sang-hyeop
20 April 2024
16:30 UTC+9

FC Seoul	2–3	Jeonbuk Hyundai Motors
Iljutchenko 10'; Paločević 30'		Song Min-kyu 6'; Lee Yeong-jae 38'; Jeon Byung-kwan 49'

Seoul World Cup Stadium, Seoul
Attendance: 28,048
Referee: Kim Hee-gon
21 April 2024
14:00 UTC+9

Gangwon FC	4–1	Incheon United
Yago 20', 45+2', 54'; Kim Lee-suk 45+4'		Mugoša 80'

Chuncheon Songam Sports Town, Chuncheon
Attendance: 6,025
Referee: Park Byeong-jin
21 April 2024
16:30 UTC+9

Daegu FC	0–0	Daejeon Hana Citizen

DGB Daegu Bank Park, Daegu
Attendance: 11,330
Referee: Kim Yong-woo
15 May 2024
16:30 UTC+9

Gwangju FC	2–1	Ulsan HD
Park Tae-jun 59'; Lee Kang-hyun 82'		Um Won-sang 85'

Gwangju Football Stadium, Gwangju
Attendance: 8,069
Referee: Lee Dong-jun

Matchday 9 (27–28 April)
27 April 2024
14:00 UTC+9

Daejeon Hana Citizen	3–1	FC Seoul
Ju Se-jong 14'; Kim Seung-dae 36', 48'		Iljutcenko 58'

Daejeon World Cup Stadium, Daejeon
Attendance: 12,700
Referee: Lee Dong-jun
27 April 2024
16:30 UTC+9

Gimcheon Sangmu	1–0	Gangwon FC
Lee Joong-min 90'

Gimcheon Stadium, Gimcheon
Attendance: 2,338
Referee: Seol Tae-hwan
27 April 2024
16:30 UTC+9

Gwangju FC	1–2	Suwon FC
Moon Min-seo 45'		Jeong Seung-won 45+2'; Kim Tae-han 90+6'

Gwangju Football Stadium, Gwangju
Attendance: 5,440
Referee: Chae Sang-hyeop
28 April 2024
14:00 UTC+9

Jeonbuk Hyundai Motors	2–2	Daegu FC
Jeon Byung-kwan 10'; Hernandes 85'		Park Jae-hyeon 90+3'; Jeong Jae-sang 90+6'

Jeonju World Cup Stadium, Jeonju
Attendance: 13,642
Referee: Jeong Dong-sik
28 April 2024
14:00 UTC+9

Pohang Steelers	0–0	Incheon United

Pohang Steel Yard, Pohang
Attendance: 7,564
Referee: Kim Hee-gon
28 April 2024
16:30 UTC+9

Ulsan HD	3–1	Jeju United
Kelvin 57'; Lee Dong-gyeong 62'; Um Won-sang 80'		Kim Tae-hwan 55'

Ulsan Munsu Football Stadium, Ulsan
Attendance: 20,253
Referee: Kim Jong-hyeok

Matchday 10 (30 April – 1 May)
30 April 2024
19:30 UTC+9

Daejeon Hana Citizen	0–0	Gimcheon Sangmu

Daejeon World Cup Stadium, Daejeon
Attendance: 4,974
Referee: Choi Hyeon-jae
30 April 2024
19:30 UTC+9

Suwon FC	0–2	FC Seoul
		Kim Sin-jin 44'; Ki Sung-yueng 66'

Suwon Sports Complex, Suwon
Attendance: 7.570
Referee: Park Byeong-jin
1 May 2024
19:00 UTC+9

Daegu FC	1–2	Ulsan HD
Park Yong-hee 34'		Kang Yun-gu 43'; Choi Kang-min 82'

DGB Daegu Bank Park, Daegu
Attendance: 11,466
Referee: Ko Hyung-jin
1 May 2024
19:00 UTC+9

Gangwon FC	2–4	Pohang Steelers
Yang Min-hyeok 75'; Jung Han-min 83'		Jeong Jae-hee 33', 52', 62'; Lee Ho-jae 90'

Chuncheon Songam Sports Town, Chuncheon
Attendance: 4,157
Referee: Jeong Dong-sik
1 May 2024
19:00 UTC+9

Incheon United	3–0	Jeonbuk Hyundai Motors
Delbridge 67'; Kim Do-hyuk 90'; Mugoša 90+6'

Incheon Football Stadium, Incheon
Attendance: 10,094
Referee: Kim Woo-sung
1 May 2024
19:00 UTC+9

Jeju United	1–3	Gwangju FC
An Tae-hyun 71'		Eom Ji-sung 45+5' (pen.); Italo 51' (o.g.); Lee Hee-gyun 69'

Jeju World Cup Stadium, Seogwipo, Jeju Province
Attendance: 4,502
Referee: Kim Yong-woo

Matchday 11 (4–6 May)
4 May 2024
14:30 UTC+9

FC Seoul	0–1	Ulsan HD
		Ádám 90+2' (pen.)

Seoul World Cup Stadium, Seoul
Attendance: 52,600
Referee: Kim Hee-gon
4 May 2024
16:30 UTC+9

Pohang Steelers	1–0	Jeonbuk Hyundai Motors
Kim Jong-woo 90+5'

Pohang Steel Yard, Pohang
Attendance: 13,002
Referee: Kim Jong-hyeok
5 May 2024
14:00 UTC+9

Suwon FC	1–2	Gangwon FC
Lee Seung-woo 76'		Cho Jin-hyeok 82'; Jung Han-min 90+1'

Suwon Sports Complex, Suwon
Attendance: 3,008
Referee: Lee Dong-jun
5 May 2024
16:30 UTC+9

Gimcheon Sangmu	2–2	Incheon United
Kim Dae-won 6'; Lee Young-jun 57'		Mugoša 78' (pen.); Gerso 85'

Gimcheon Stadium, Gimcheon
Attendance: 2,651
Referee: Chae Sang-hyeop
6 May 2024
14:00 UTC+9

Jeju United	1–0	Daegu FC
Kim Tae-hwan 77'

Jeju World Cup Stadium, Seogwipo, Jeju Province
Attendance: 10,033
Referee: Kim Dae-yong
6 May 2024
16:30 UTC+9

Gwangju FC	2–1	Daejeon Hana Citizen
Lee Hee-gyun 52'; Heo Yool 87'		Kryvotsyuk 15'

Gwangju Football Stadium, Gwangju
Attendance: 4,221
Referee: Shin Yong-jun

Matchday 12 (11–12 May)
11 May 2024
16:30 UTC+9

Incheon United	1–2	FC Seoul
Mugoša 37'		Willyan 49', 63'

Incheon Football Stadium, Incheon
Attendance: 14,435
Referee: Kim Yong-woo
11 May 2024
19:00 UTC+9

Gangwon FC	3–3	Daejeon Hana Citizen
Yang Min-hyeok 41'; Lee Sang-heon 63'; Yago 72'		Jeong Gang-min 2'; Lee Jun-gyu 21'; Mlapa 90+12' (pen.)

Chuncheon Songam Sports Town, Chuncheon
Attendance: 4,236
Referee: Choi Hyeon-jae
11 May 2024
19:00 UTC+9

Daegu FC	3–2	Gwangju FC
Park Yong-hee 7'; Jeong Jae-sang 26'; Cesinha 87' (pen.)		Lee Kun-hee 5'; Byeon Jun-soo 10'

DGB Daegu Bank Park, Daegu
Attendance: 11,967
Referee: Kim Woo-sung
12 May 2024
14:00 UTC+9

Jeonbuk Hyundai Motors	2–3	Suwon FC
Moon Seon-min 25'; Park Jae-yong 35' (pen.)		Lee Seung-woo 57', 80'; Jung Jae-min 84'

Jeonju World Cup Stadium, Jeonju
Attendance: 13,009
Referee: Jeong Dong-sik
12 May 2024
16:30 UTC+9

Pohang Steelers	1–1	Jeju United
Hong Yun-sang 13'		Italo 90'

Pohang Steel Yard, Pohang
Attendance: 9,577
Referee: Ko Hyung-jin
12 May 2024
16:30 UTC+9

Ulsan HD	2–2	Gimcheon Sangmu
Ludwigson 3'; Kim Young-gwon 52'		Kim Dae-won 29' (pen.); Kim Tae-hyun 90+4'

Ulsan Munsu Football Stadium, Ulsan
Attendance: 16,394
Referee: Park Byeong-jin

Matchday 13 (18–19 May)
18 May 2024
16:30 UTC+9

Daejeon Hana Citizen	0–1	Incheon United
		Mun Ji-hwan 49'

Daejeon World Cup Stadium, Daejeon
Attendance: 10,535
Referee: Kim Dae-yong
18 May 2024
19:00 UTC+9

Gimcheon Sangmu	1–0	Jeju United
Kim Tae-hyun 47'

Gimcheon Stadium, Gimcheon
Attendance: 2,279
Referee: Lee Dong-jun
19 May 2024
16:30 UTC+9

Gwangju FC	0–3	Jeonbuk Hyundai Motors
		Song Min-kyu 28' (pen.); Jeon Byung-kwan 31', 47'

Gwangju Football Stadium, Gwangju
Attendance: 8,091
Referee: Kim Hee-gon
19 May 2024
16:30 UTC+9

Gangwon FC	1–0	Ulsan HD
Yago 66'

Chuncheon Songam Sports Town, Chuncheon
Attendance: 7,850
Referee: Chae Sang-hyeop
19 May 2024
16:30 UTC+9

FC Seoul	1–2	Daegu FC
Iljutcenko 90+4'		Choi Jun 57' (o.g.); Park Yong-hee 70'

Seoul World Cup Stadium, Seoul
Attendance: 27,365
Referee: Kim Jong-hyeok
19 May 2024
19:00 UTC+9

Suwon FC	1–0	Pohang Steelers
Jeong Seung-won 46'

Suwon Sports Complex, Suwon
Referee: Shin Yong-jun

Matchday 14 (25–26 May)
25 May 2024
14:00 UTC+9

Jeonbuk Hyundai Motors	0–0	Gimcheon Sangmu

Jeonju World Cup Stadium, Jeonju
Attendance: 11,726
Referee: Choi Hyeon-jae
25 May 2024
16:30 UTC+9

Ulsan HD	4–1	Daejeon Hana Citizen
Kim Min-woo 36'; Ludwigson 65', 76'; Joo Min-kyu 90+3'		Lim Duk-geun 70'

Ulsan Munsu Football Stadium, Ulsan
Attendance: 14,676
Referee: Kim Yong-woo
25 May 2024
19:00 UTC+9

Incheon United	1–1	Gwangju FC
Mugoša 90+9' (pen.)		Choi Kyoung-rok 47'

Incheon Football Stadium, Incheon
Attendance: 9,107
Referee: Park Byeong-jin
25 May 2024
19:00 UTC+9

Pohang Steelers	2–2	FC Seoul
Lee Tae-seok 5' (o.g.); Lee Ho-jae 85' (pen.)		Iljutcenko 42'; Lim Sang-hyub 87'

Pohang Steel Yard, Pohang
Attendance: 13,467
Referee: Jeong Dong-sik
26 May 2024
16:30 UTC+9

Daegu FC	1–2	Gangwon FC
Jang Seong-won 76'		Kim Lee-suk 53'; Hwang Mun-ki 90+2'

DGB Daegu Bank Park, Daegu
Attendance: 11,977
Referee: Ko Hyung-jin
26 May 2024
19:00 UTC+9

Jeju United	1–0	Suwon FC
Seo Jin-su 12'

Jeju World Cup Stadium, Seogwipo, Jeju Province
Attendance: 3,052
Referee: Kim Woo-sung

Matchday 15 (28–29 May)
28 May 2024
19:30 UTC+9

Gwangju FC	0–1	Pohang Steelers
		Kim Dong-jin 6'

Gwangju Football Stadium, Gwangju
Attendance: 2,687
Referee: Kim Jong-hyeok
28 May 2024
19:30 UTC+9

Gimcheon Sangmu	0–0	FC Seoul

Gimcheon Stadium, Gimcheon
Attendance: 3,372
Referee: Chae Sang-hyeop
29 May 2024
19:30 UTC+9

Daejeon Hana Citizen	0–1	Jeju United
		Han Jong-mu 46'

Daejeon World Cup Stadium, Daejeon
Attendance: 4,759
Referee: Kim Hee-gon
29 May 2024
19:30 UTC+9

Gangwon FC	2–1	Jeonbuk Hyundai Motors
Yang Min-hyeok 4'; Yago 78'		Lee Yeong-jae 24'

Chuncheon Songam Sports Town, Chuncheon
Attendance: 6,125
Referee: Jeong Dong-sik
29 May 2024
19:30 UTC+9

Incheon United	1–1	Ulsan HD
M'Poku 48'		Um Won-sang 81'

Incheon Football Stadium, Incheon
Attendance: 8,413
Referee: Shin Yong-jun
29 May 2024
19:30 UTC+9

Suwon FC	2–0	Daegu FC
Kang Sang-yoon 59'; Lee Seung-woo 83'

Suwon Sports Complex, Suwon
Attendance: 2,328
Referee: Kim Dae-yong

Matchday 16 (1–2 June)
1 June 2024
16:30 UTC+9

Ulsan HD	1–0	Jeonbuk Hyundai Motors
Esaka 90+4'

Ulsan Munsu Football Stadium, Ulsan
Attendance: 29,007
Referee: Ko Hyung-jin
1 June 2024
19:00 UTC+9

Gimcheon Sangmu	3–1	Pohang Steelers
Kang Hyun-muk 71'; Yu Kang-hyun 90+8' (pen.); Choi Gi-yun 90+10'		Jorge Teixeira 90' (pen.)

Gimcheon Stadium, Gimcheon
Attendance: 4,574
Referee: Choi Hyeon-jae
1 June 2024
19:00 UTC+9

Suwon FC	3–1	Incheon United
Lee Seung-woo 27'; Jeong Seung-won 45+4'; Jang Young-Woo 90+7'		Mugoša 66' (pen.)

Suwon Sports Complex, Suwon
Attendance: 7,511
Referee: Kim Yong-woo
2 June 2024
16:30 UTC+9

Jeju United	1–2	Gangwon FC
An Tae-hyun 73'		Song Jun-seok 4'; Yago 42'

Jeju World Cup Stadium, Seogwipo, Jeju Province
Attendance: 6,534
Referee: Jeong Dong-sik
2 June 2024
16:30 UTC+9

Daejeon Hana Citizen	1–0	Daegu FC
Mlapa 84'

Daejeon World Cup Stadium, Daejeon
Attendance: 9,649
Referee: Park Byeong-jin
2 June 2024
19:00 UTC+9

FC Seoul	1–2	Gwangju FC
Kwon Wan-kyu 45+1'		Lee Kun-hee 23'; Mikeltadze 77'

Seoul World Cup Stadium, Seoul
Attendance: 21,100
Referee: Kim Woo-sung

Matchday 17 (15–16 June)
15 June 2024
18:00 UTC+9

Pohang Steelers	1–1	Daejeon Hana Citizen
Heo Yong-joon 25'		Lee Dong-hee 15' (o.g.)

Pohang Steel Yard, Pohang
Attendance: 8,422
Referee: Kim Dae-yong
15 June 2024
19:00 UTC+9

Gwangju FC	2–0	Gimcheon Sangmu
Park Tae-jun 76'; Eom Ji-sung 89'

Gwangju Football Stadium, Gwangju
Attendance: 4,561
Referee: Ko Hyung-jin
15 June 2024
20:00 UTC+9

Gangwon FC	3–1	Suwon FC
Yu In-soo 13'; Yago 56'; Yang Min-hyeok 66'		Lee Seung-woo 55'

Chuncheon Songam Sports Town, Chuncheon
Attendance: 9,704
Referee: Shin Yong-jun
16 June 2024
18:00 UTC+9

Jeonbuk Hyundai Motors	2–2	Incheon United
Moon Seon-min 9', 71'		Kim Do-hyuk 77'; Kim Seong-min 90+1'

Jeonju World Cup Stadium, Jeonju
Attendance: 11,477
Referee: Chae Sang-hyeop
16 June 2024
18:00 UTC+9

Ulsan HD	2–2	FC Seoul
Joo Min-kyu 2'; Lee Tae-seok 43' (o.g.)		Iljutcenko 52', 77'

Ulsan Munsu Football Stadium, Ulsan
Attendance: 23,856
Referee: Kim Jong-hyeok
16 June 2024
19:00 UTC+9

Daegu FC	1–0	Jeju United
Bobsin 24'

DGB Daegu Bank Park, Daegu
Attendance: 9,885
Referee: Lee Dong-jun

Matchday 18 (22–23 June)
22 June 2024
18:00 UTC+9

Daegu FC	3–0	Jeonbuk Hyundai Motors
Yoshino 40'; Cesinha 61' (pen.), 81'

DGB Daegu Bank Park, Daegu
Attendance: 10,540
Referee: Kim Woo-sung
22 June 2024
19:00 UTC+9

Gangwon FC	2–3	Gimcheon Sangmu
Kim Dae-woo 2'; Cho Jin-hyuk 36'		Seo Min-woo 24'; Mo Jae-hyeon 40'; Yu Kang-hyun 45+4'

Gangneung Stadium, Gangneung
Attendance: 11,578
Referee: Park Byeong-jin
22 June 2024
19:00 UTC+9

Daejeon Hana Citizen	2–1	Gwangju FC
Cheon Seong-hoon 69'; Song Chang-seok 90+5'		Mikeltadze 5'

Daejeon World Cup Stadium, Daejeon
Attendance: 7,350
Referee: Kim Jong-hyeok
22 June 2024
20:00 UTC+9

FC Seoul	3–0	Suwon FC
Park Seong-hoon 22'; Kang Seong-jin 87'; Willyan 90+6'

Seoul World Cup Stadium, Seoul
Attendance: 25,157
Referee: Ko Hyung-jin
23 June 2024
18:00 UTC+9

Incheon United	1–3	Pohang Steelers
Kim Bo-sub 79'		Heo Yong-joon 27'; Lee Ho-jae 51', 72'

Incheon Football Stadium, Incheon
Attendance: 8,198
Referee: Jeong Dong-sik
23 June 2024
18:00 UTC+9

Jeju United	2–3	Ulsan HD
Reis 23', 78' (pen.)		Joo Min-kyu 45+4', 83'; Kim Min-woo 64'

Jeju World Cup Stadium, Seogwipo, Jeju Province
Attendance: 6,557
Referee: Kim Yong-woo

Matchday 19 (25–26 June)
25 June 2024
19:30 UTC+9

Suwon FC	1–0	Gwangju FC
Jeong Seung-won 75'

Suwon Sports Complex, Suwon
Attendance: 3,596
Referee: Jeong Song-sik
25 June 2024
19:30 UTC+9

Gimcheon Sangmu	2–0	Daejeon Hana Citizen
Choi Gi-yun 77', 90+4'

Gimcheon Stadium, Gimcheon
Attendance: 1,925
Referee: Shin Yong-jun
26 June 2024
19:30 UTC+9

Ulsan HD	1–0	Daegu FC
Bojanić 38'

Ulsan Munsu Football Stadium, Ulsan
Attendance: 10,273
Referee: Park Byeong-jin
26 June 2024
19:30 UTC+9

Jeonbuk Hyundai Motors	1–1	Pohang Steelers
Tiago 16'		Oberdan 20'

Jeonju World Cup Stadium, Jeonju
Attendance: 6,546
Referee: Lee Dong-jun
26 June 2024
19:30 UTC+9

FC Seoul	2–0	Gangwon FC
Lingard 56' (pen.); Ryu Jae-moon 73'

Seoul World Cup Stadium, Seoul
Attendance: 13,303
Referee: Kim Yong-woo
26 June 2024
19:30 UTC+9

Jeju United	1–0	Incheon United
Reis 73'

Jeju World Cup Stadium, Seogwipo, Jeju Province
Attendance: 3,044
Referee: Choi Gwang-ho

Matchday 20 (29–30 June)
29 June 2024
18:00 UTC+9

Gimcheon Sangmu	2–0	Daegu FC
Choi Gi-yun 78'; Park Sang-hyeok 81'

Gimcheon Stadium, Gimcheon
Attendance: 3,832
Referee: Seol Tae-hwan
29 June 2024
19:00 UTC+9

Jeonbuk Hyundai Motors	1–5	FC Seoul
Tiago 67'		Kwon Wan-kyu 24'; Han Seung-gyu 45+2'; Lee Seung-mo 61'; Kang Seong-jin 89'; Ronaldo Tavares 90+8'

Jeonju World Cup Stadium, Jeonju
Attendance: 12,508
Referee: Shin Yong-jun
29 June 2024
20:00 UTC+9

Daejeon Hana Citizen	0–2	Suwon FC
		Anderson 16'; Jeong Seung-won 82'

Daejeon World Cup Stadium, Daejeon
Attendance: 5,290
Referee: Lee Dong-jun
30 June 2024
18:00 UTC+9

Pohang Steelers	2–1	Ulsan HD
Hong Yun-sang 2'; Lee Ho-jae 19' (pen.)		Ko Seung-beom 25'

Pohang Steel Yard, Pohang
Attendance: 13,079
Referee: Ko Hyung-jin
30 June 2024
19:00 UTC+9

Gwangju FC	2–1	Jeju United
Sin Chang-moo 8'; Gabriel 90'		An Tae-hyun 23'

Gwangju Football Stadium, Gwangju
Attendance: 2,389
Referee: Kim Dae-yong
30 June 2024
19:00 UTC+9

Incheon United	0–1	Gangwon FC
		Yago 71'

Incheon Football Stadium, Incheon
Attendance: 6,164
Referee: Chae Sang-hyeop

Matchday 21 (5–7 July)
5 July 2024
19:30 UTC+9

Incheon United	1–1	Gimcheon Sangmu
Mugoša 90'		Park Sang-hyeok 40'

Incheon Football Stadium, Incheon
Attendance: 7,012
Referee: Kim Hee-gon
5 July 2024
19:30 UTC+9

Suwon FC	1–1	Ulsan HD
Kang Sang-yoon 73'		Esaka 61'

Suwon Sports Complex, Suwon
Attendance: 7,378
Referee: Kim Yong-woo
6 July 2024
19:00 UTC+9

Jeju United	3–2	FC Seoul
Seo Jin-su 7'; Rim Chang-woo 24'; Han Jong-moo 89'		Iljutcenko 53', 72'

Jeju World Cup Stadium, Seogwipo, Jeju Province
Attendance: 12,409
Referee: Ko Hyung-jin
6 July 2024
19:30 UTC+9

Daegu FC	3–3	Pohang Steelers
Cesinha 29', 87'; Edgar 62'		Jeong Jae-hee 45+6'; Hong Yun-sang 55'; Lee Ho-jae 68'

DGB Daegu Bank Park, Daegu
Attendance: 11,881
Referee: Kim Jong-hyeok
7 July 2024
19:00 UTC+9

Daejeon Hana Citizen	2–2	Jeonbuk Hyundai Motors
Cheon Seong-hoon 67' (pen.); Kim Jun-beom 90'		Song Min-kyu 20'; Tiago 53'

Daejeon World Cup Stadium, Daejeon
Attendance: 10,378
Referee: Choi Hyeon-jae
7 July 2024
19:00 UTC+9

Gangwon FC	2–0	Gwangju FC
Jung Han-min 33'; Kim Jin-ho 81' (o.g.)

Gangneung Stadium, Gangneung
Attendance: 10,334
Referee: Kim Woo-sung

Matchday 22 (9–10 July)
9 July 2024
19:30 UTC+9

Daegu FC	0–0	Incheon United

DGB Daegu Bank Park, Daegu
Attendance: 7,152
Referee: Lee Dong-jun
9 July 2024
19:30 UTC+9

Gimcheon Sangmu	2–3	Suwon FC
Jang Young-woo 54' (o.g.); Seo Min-woo 75'		Kim Dong-heon 10' (o.g.); Ji Dong-won 45'; Yoon Bit-garam 78'

Gimcheon Stadium, Gimcheon
Attendance: 1,085
Referee: Kim Dae-yong
10 July 2024
19:30 UTC+9

Ulsan HD	0–1	Gwangju FC
		Lee Hee-Gyun 67'

Ulsan Munsu Football Stadium, Ulsan
Attendance: 9,444
Referee: Shin Yong-jun
10 July 2024
19:30 UTC+9

Pohang Steelers	2–0	Gangwon FC
Oberdan 50'; Yun Min-ho 76'

Pohang Steel Yard, Pohang
Attendance: 5,287
Referee: Park Byeong-jin
10 July 2024
19:30 UTC+9

Jeonbuk Hyundai Motors	2–1	Jeju United
Jeon Byung-kwan 2'; Tiago 69'		An Tae-hyun 1'

Jeonju World Cup Stadium, Jeonju
Attendance: 5,560
Referee: Chae Sang-hyeop
10 July 2024
19:30 UTC+9

FC Seoul	2–1	Daejeon Hana Citizen
Cho Young-wook 60'; Lingard 65'		Mlapa 7'

Seoul World Cup Stadium, Seoul
Attendance: 15,037
Referee: Kim Jong-hyeok

=== Matches 23–33 ===
Teams played each other once, either at home or away.

Home \ Away	USH	GCS	GWN	PHS	SEL	SWN	GJU	JJU	JHM	DGU	DHC	ICU
Ulsan HD	—	2–1	2–0	5–4	1–0	1–2	—	—	—	1–0	—	—
Gimcheon Sangmu	—	—	1–2	—	—	—	2–0	—	4–0	—	2–2	2–0
Gangwon FC	—	—	—	—	—	2–2	3–2	4–0	4–2	1–1	—	—
Pohang Steelers	—	1–2	2–1	—	1–2	1–1	—	—	—	1–2	—	1–0
FC Seoul	—	1–0	2–0	—	—	1–0	—	1–0	—	—	2–3	—
Suwon FC	—	2–4	—	—	—	—	—	5–0	0–6	2–2	1–2	—
Gwangju FC	0–1	—	—	2–1	3–1	1–0	—	0–2	—	—	—	0–2
Jeju United	1–0	1–0	—	2–1	—	—	—	—	—	0–4	2–1	0–1
Jeonbuk Hyundai Motors	2–0	—	—	2–1	0–0	—	0–1	2–1	—	—	—	—
Daegu FC	—	3–0	—	—	1–1	—	0–1	—	4–3	—	1–1	1–2
Daejeon Hana Citizen	0–1	—	1–1	1–2	—	—	2–0	—	0–0	—	—	2–1
Incheon United	0–0	—	1–3	—	0–1	1–4	—	—	0–1	—	—	—

Source: K League
Legend: Blue = home team win; Yellow = draw; Red = away team win.

Matchday 23 (13–14 July)
13 July 2024
19:00 UTC+9

Ulsan HD	1–0	FC Seoul
Joo Min-kyu 90+3'

Ulsan Munsu Football Stadium, Ulsan
Attendance: 21,064
Referee: Kim Woo-sung
13 July 2024
19:30 UTC+9

Daejeon Hana Citizen	1–1	Gangwon FC
Park Jeong-in 28'		Yu In-soo 78'

Daejeon World Cup Stadium, Daejeon
Attendance: 7,147
Referee: Kim Dae-yong
13 July 2024
19:30 UTC+9

Jeju United	2–1	Pohang Steelers
Reis 63'; Yuri 90+11' (pen.)		Hong Yun-sang 60'

Jeju World Cup Stadium, Seogwipo, Jeju Province
Attendance: 4,412
Referee: Kim Yong-woo
14 July 2024
19:00 UTC+9

Gwangju FC	0–2	Incheon United
		Jonjić 44'; Gabriel 83' (o.g.)

Gwangju Football Stadium, Gwangju
Attendance: 2,969
Referee: Ko Hyung-jin
14 July 2024
19:00 UTC+9

Suwon FC	2–2	Daegu FC
Ji Dong-won 43'; Kwon Kyung-won 90'		Edgar 54'; Park Sae-jin 66'

Suwon Sports Complex, Suwon
Attendance: 5,594
Referee: Seol Tae-hwan
14 July 2024
19:00 UTC+9

Gimcheon Sangmu	4–0	Jeonbuk Hyundai Motors
Lee Dong-gyeong 31' (pen.); Kim Dae-won 69'; Park Sang-hyeok 90+3'; Maeng Seong-ung 90+6'

Gimcheon Stadium, Gimcheon
Attendance: 3,524
Referee: Kim Jong-hyeok

Matchday 24 (20–21 July)
20 July 2024
19:30 UTC+9

Jeonbuk Hyundai Motors	2–0	Ulsan HD
Tiago 78'; Andrigo 90+7'

Jeonju World Cup Stadium, Jeonju
Attendance: 18,753
Referee: Kim Dae-yong
20 July 2024
19:30 UTC+9

Gangwon FC	4–0	Jeju United
Chung Woon 14' (o.g.); Yang Min-hyeok 24', 65'; Kovačević 28'

Gangneung Stadium, Gangneung
Attendance: 10,710
Referee: Shin Yong-jun
21 July 2024
19:00 UTC+9

Incheon United	1–4	Suwon FC
Mugoša 49'		Kang Sang-yoon 15'; Jeong Seung-won 27'; Park Cheol-woo 78'; Lee Seung-woo 90+2'

Incheon Football Stadium, Incheon
Attendance: 10,303
Referee: Chae Sang-hyeop
21 July 2024
19:00 UTC+9

Daegu FC	0–1	Gwangju FC
		Mikeltadze 35'

DGB Daegu Bank Park, Daegu
Attendance: 10,721
Referee: Kim Jong-hyeok
21 July 2024
19:00 UTC+9

FC Seoul	1–0	Gimcheon Sangmu
Iljutcenko 51'

Seoul World Cup Stadium, Seoul
Attendance: 18,577
Referee: Kim Yong-woo
21 July 2024
19:00 UTC+9

Daejeon Hana Citizen	1–2	Pohang Steelers
Kim Jun-beom 2'		Hong Yun-sang 47'; Lee Ho-jae 48'

Daejeon World Cup Stadium, Daejeon
Attendance: 6,635
Referee: Lee Dong-jun

Matchday 25 (26–28 July)
26 July 2024
19:30 UTC+9

Jeju United	1–0	Ulsan HD
Hong Joon-ho 90+2'

Jeju World Cup Stadium, Seogwipo, Jeju Province
Attendance: 7,346
Referee: Kim Hee-gon
26 July 2024
19:30 UTC+9

Gangwon FC	4–2	Jeonbuk Hyundai Motors
Yang Min-hyeok 33'; Kim Kyung-min 55', 63'; Jin Jun-seo 86'		Song Min-kyu 62'; Kim Jin-gyu 71'

Gangneung Stadium, Gangneung
Attendance: 12,272
Referee: Ko Hyung-jin
27 July 2024
19:00 UTC+9

Gwangju FC	1–0	Suwon FC
Gabriel 5'

Gwangju Football Stadium, Gwangju
Attendance: 4,239
Referee: Song Min-seok
27 July 2024
19:30 UTC+9

Daegu FC	1–1	Daejeon Hana Citizen
Yoshino 16'		Kelvin 45'

DGB Daegu Bank Park, Daegu
Attendance: 11,373
Referee: Kim Woo-sung
27 July 2024
19:30 UTC+9

Incheon United	0–1	FC Seoul
		Kang Ju-hyeok 47'

Incheon Football Stadium, Incheon
Attendance: 15,213
Referee: Jeong Dong-sik
28 July 2024
19:00 UTC+9

Pohang Steelers	1–2	Gimcheon Sangmu
Lee Ho-jae 86' (pen.)		Kim Dae-won 22'; Yu Kang-hyun 55'

Pohang Steel Yard, Pohang
Attendance: 13,221
Referee: Chae Sang-hyeop

Matchday 26 (9–11 August)
9 August 2024
19:30 UTC+9

Gimcheon Sangmu	1–2	Gangwon FC
Kim Young-bin 36' (o.g.)		Lee Sang-heon 45+2', 65'

Gimcheon Stadium, Gimcheon
Attendance: 3,402
Referee: Kim Dae-yong
9 August 2024
19:30 UTC+9

Jeonbuk Hyundai Motors	0–1	Gwangju FC
		Asani 70'

Jeonju World Cup Stadium, Jeonju
Attendance: 15,178
Referee: Park Byeong-jin
10 August 2024
19:00 UTC+9

Ulsan HD	1–0	Daegu FC
Ko Myeong-seok 30' (o.g.)

Ulsan Munsu Football Stadium, Ulsan
Attendance: 17,372
Referee: Lee Dong-jun
10 August 2024
19:30 UTC+9

Jeju United	0–1	Incheon United
		Mugoša 90+2'

Jeju World Cup Stadium, Seogwipo, Jeju Province
Attendance: 6271
Referee: Kim Yong-woo
10 August 2024
19:30 UTC+9

Suwon FC	1–2	Daejeon Hana Citizen
Jeong Seung-won 43' (pen.)		Ishida 12' (pen.), 51'

Suwon Sports Complex, Suwon
Attendance: 5,223
Referee: Choi Hyeon-jae
11 August 2024
19:00 UTC+9

Pohang Steelers	1–2	FC Seoul
Jeon Min-gwang 50'		Cho Young-wook 4'; Lee Seung-mo 61'

Pohang Steel Yard, Pohang
Attendance: 10,730
Referee: Kim Jong-hyeok

Matchday 27 (16–18 August)
16 August 2024
19:30 UTC+9

Daegu FC	3–0	Gimcheon Sangmu
Cesinha 58', 84'; Jung Chi-in 60'

DGB Daegu Bank Park, Daegu
Attendance: 9,817
Referee: Kim Hee-gon
16 August 2024
19:30 UTC+9

FC Seoul	1–0	Jeju United
Lucas 22'

Seoul World Cup Stadium, Seoul
Attendance: 18,029
Referee: Shin Yong-jun
17 August 2024
19:00 UTC+9

Jeonbuk Hyundai Motors	2–1	Pohang Steelers
Andrigo 44'; Kwon Chang-hoon 90+10'		Wanderson 72'

Jeonju World Cup Stadium, Jeonju
Attendance: 14,814
Referee: Kim Woo-sung
17 August 2024
19:30 UTC+9

Daejeon Hana Citizen	2–1	Incheon United
Kim Jae-woo 36'; Gutkovskis 90+6'		Mugoša 61'

Daejeon World Cup Stadium, Daejeon
Attendance: 8,618
Referee: Chae Sang-hyeop
18 August 2024
19:00 UTC+9

Gangwon FC	3–2	Gwangju FC
Kovačević 45+4', 50'; Hore 74'		Asani 14' (pen.); Tući 22' (o.g.)

Gangneung Stadium, Gangneung
Attendance: 13,170
Referee: Kim Jong-hyeok
18 August 2024
19:00 UTC+9

Ulsan HD	1–2	Suwon FC
Ludwigson 71'		Son Jun-ho 42'; Anderson 54'

Suwon Sports Complex, Suwon
Attendance: 13,204
Referee: Ko Hyung-jin

Matchday 28 (24–25 August)
24 August 2024
19:00 UTC+9

Pohang Steelers	1–2	Daegu FC
Baek Sung-dong 71'		Hwang Jae-won 49'; Caio Marcelo 50'

Pohang Steel Yard, Pohang
Attendance: 10,691
Referee: Jeong Dong-sik
24 August 2024
19:30 UTC+9

Incheon United	0–1	Jeonbuk Hyundai Motors
		Kim Jin-gyu 7'

Incheon Football Stadium, Incheon
Attendance: 15,422
Referee: Park Byeong-jin
24 August 2024
19:30 UTC+9

FC Seoul	2–0	Gangwon FC
Lee Seung-mo 31'; Lingard 40'

Seoul World Cup Stadium, Seoul
Attendance: 34,086
Referee: Kim Woo-sung
25 August 2024
19:00 UTC+9

Gimcheon Sangmu	2–2	Daejeon Hana Citizen
Lee Dong-gyeong 43'; Yu Kang-hyun 47'		Park Seung-wook 71' (o.g.); Kim Hyun-woo 90+1'

Gimcheon Stadium, Gimcheon
Attendance: 3,261
Referee: Ko Hyung-jin
25 August 2024
19:00 UTC+9

Gwangju FC	0–1	Ulsan HD
		Yago 87'

Gwangju Football Stadium, Gwangju
Attendance: 5,081
Referee: Chae Sang-hyeop
25 August 2024
19:00 UTC+9

Suwon FC	5–0	Jeju United
Anderson 7', 45+4'; Ji Dong-won 60'; Ha Jeong-woo 88'; Jeong Seung-won 90+1'

Suwon Sports Complex, Suwon
Attendance: 3,275
Referee: Kim Dae-yong

Matchday 29 (31 August – 1 September)
31 August 2024
19:00 UTC+9

Ulsan HD	5–4	Pohang Steelers
Arabidze 5', 36'; Yago 57'; Ludwigson 78'; Kim Young-gwon 88'		Hong Yun-sang 9'; Jorge Teixeira 83'; Eo Jeong-won 89'; Lee Tae-seok 90+2'

Ulsan Munsu Football Stadium, Ulsan
Attendance: 22,106
Referee: Kim Hee-gon
31 August 2024
19:30 UTC+9

Daegu FC	1–2	Incheon United
Jung Chi-in 17'		Mugoša 49'; Kim Do-hyuk 63'

DGB Daegu Bank Park, Daegu
Attendance: 11,994
Referee: Kim Yong-woo
1 September 2024
18:00 UTC+9

Jeju United	1–0	Gimcheon Sangmu
Yuri 60' (pen.)

Jeju World Cup Stadium, Seogwipo, Jeju Province
Attendance: 5,469
Referee: Kim Jong-hyeok
1 September 2024
19:00 UTC+9

Daejeon Hana Citizen	2–0	Gwangju FC
Yun Do-young 1'; Kim In-kyun 79'

Daejeon World Cup Stadium, Daejeon
Attendance: 7,445
Referee: Choi Gyu-hyeon
1 September 2024
19:00 UTC+9

Gangwon FC	2–2	Suwon FC
Son Jun-ho 3' (o.g.); Kovačević 48'		Anderson 21'; Choi Kyu-baek 90+5'

Gangneung Stadium, Gangneung
Attendance: 12,292
Referee: Shin Yong-jun
1 September 2024
19:00 UTC+9

Jeonbuk Hyundai Motors	0–0	FC Seoul

Jeonju World Cup Stadium, Jeonju
Attendance: 22,749
Referee: Lee Dong-jun

Matchday 30 (13–15 September)
13 September 2024
19:30 UTC+9

Gwangju FC	2–1	Pohang Steelers
Gabriel 48'; Choi Kyoung-rok 71'		Wanderson 89'

Gwangju Football Stadium, Gwsangju
Attendance: 3,136
Referee: Ko Hyung-jin
13 September 2024
19:30 UTC+9

Ulsan HD	2–0	Gangwon FC
Kang Yun-gu 14'; Esaka 79'

Ulsan Munsu Football Stadium, Ulsan
Attendance: 22,010
Referee: Park Byeong-jin
14 September 2024
16:30 UTC+9

FC Seoul	2–3	Daejeon Hana Citizen
Choi Jun 9'; Lingard 48'		Ishida 4'; Choi Geon-ju 6'; Kim Hyeon-ug 83'

Seoul World Cup Stadium, Seoul
Attendance: 26,790
Referee: Kim Dae-yong
14 September 2024
19:00 UTC+9

Jeju United	0–4	Daegu FC
		Jeong Chi-in 54'; Cesinha 62'; Go Jae-hyun 81'; Ítalo 90+1'

Jeju World Cup Stadium, Seogwipo, Jeju Province
Attendance: 7,746
Referee: Chae Sang-hyeop
14 September 2024
19:00 UTC+9

Suwon FC	0–6	Jeonbuk Hyundai Motors
		Lee Yeong-jae 18'; Song Min-kyu 53' (pen.); Andrigo 69'; Jeon Jin-woo 87'; Lee Seung-woo 90+2'; Hernandes 90+4'

Suwon Sports Complex, Suwon
Attendance: 9,136
Referee: Choi Hyeon-jae
15 September 2024
16:30 UTC+9

Gimcheon Sangmu	2–0	Incheon United
Lee Dong-jun 60'; Kim Dae-won 90+7'

Gimcheon Stadium, Gimcheon
Attendance: 3,315
Referee: Kim Woo-sung

Matchday 31 (21–22 September)
21 September 2024
16:30 UTC+9

Suwon FC	2–4	Gimcheon Sangmu
Ji Dong-won 45+3'; Anderson 71'		Lee Seung-won 27'; Kim Seung-sub 38'; Park Sang-hyeok 51'; Lee Dong-gyeong 89'

Suwon Sports Complex, Suwon
Attendance: 3,059
Referee: Jeong Dong-sik
21 September 2024
19:00 UTC+9

Daegu FC	1–1	FC Seoul
Cesinha 90+8'		Iljutcenko 80'

DGB Daegu Bank Park, Daegu
Attendance: 11,837
Referee: Kim Jong-hyeok
22 September 2024
16:30 UTC+9

Gwangju FC	0–2	Jeju United
		Yoshio 67'; Seo Jin-su 90+2'

Gwangju Football Stadium, Gwangju
Attendance: 3,468
Referee: Kim Yong-woo
22 September 2024
16:30 UTC+9

Pohang Steelers	2–1	Gangwon FC
Tući 6' (o.g.); Jorge Teixeira 90+5'		Yang Min-hyeok 90+4'

Pohang Steel Yard, Pohang
Attendance: 9,427
Referee: Song Min-seok
22 September 2024
19:00 UTC+9

Daejeon Hana Citizen	0–0	Jeonbuk Hyundai Motors

Daejeon World Cup Stadium, Daejeon
Attendance: 18,473
Referee: Kim Hee-gon
22 September 2024
19:00 UTC+9

Incheon United	0–0	Ulsan HD

Incheon Football Stadium, Incheon
Attendance: 13,888
Referee: Shin Yong-jun

Matchday 32 (27–29 September)
27 September 2024
19:30 UTC+9

Daejeon Hana Citizen	0–1	Ulsan HD
		Bojanić 19' (pen.)

Daejeon World Cup Stadium, Daejeon
Attendance: 11,219
Referee: Chae Sang-hyeop
27 September 2024
19:30 UTC+9

Pohang Steelers	1–0	Incheon United
Jorge Teixeira 83' (pen.)

Pohang Steel Yard, Pohang
Attendance: 6,332
Referee: Kim Dae-yong
28 September 2024
16:30 UTC+9

Gangwon FC	1–1	Daegu FC
Hwang Mun-ki 69'		Cesinha 74'

Gangneung Stadium, Gangneung
Attendance: 12,677
Referee: Ko Hyung-jin
28 September 2024
19:00 UTC+9

Gimcheon Sangmu	2–0	Gwangju FC
Mo Jae-hyeon 48'; Lee Dong-gyeong 74'

Gimcheon Stadium, Gimcheon
Attendance: 3,238
Referee: Lee Dong-jun
28 September 2024
19:00 UTC+9

Jeonbuk Hyundai Motors	2–1	Jeju United
Kim Jin-gyu 60'; Jeon Jin-woo 90+6'		Yuri 86' (pen.)

Jeonju World Cup Stadium, Jeonju
Attendance: 21,386
Referee: Kim Woo-sung
29 September 2024
16:30 UTC+9

FC Seoul	1–0	Suwon FC
Iljutcenko 67'

Seoul World Cup Stadium, Seoul
Attendance: 31,037
Referee: Park Byeong-jin

Matchday 33 (6 October)
6 October 2024
15:00 UTC+9

Ulsan HD	2–1	Gimcheon Sangmu
Ko Seung-beom 76'; Yago 80'		Mo Jae-hyeon 22'

Ulsan Munsu Football Stadium, Ulsan
Attendance: 24,417
Referee: Kim Jong-hyeok
6 October 2024
15:00 UTC+9

Gwangju FC	3–1	FC Seoul
Heo Yool 73'; Lee Kun-hee 79'; Asani 90+7'		Lingard 85'

Gwangju Football Stadium, Gwangju
Attendance: 6,357
Referee: Kim Hee-gon
6 October 2024
15:00 UTC+9

Daegu FC	4–3	Jeonbuk Hyundai Motors
Cesinha 7'; Ítalo 36'; Edgar 90+3'; Park Sae-jin 90+7'		Lee Yeong-jae 59'; Ahn Hyeon-beom 79'; Moon Seon-min 87'

DGB Daegu Bank Park, Daegu
Attendance: 12,072
Referee: Jeong Dong-sik
6 October 2024
15:00 UTC+9

Incheon United	1–3	Gangwon FC
Hong Si-hoo 72'		Yang Min-hyeok 34'; Lee Sang-heon 85', 90+2'

Incheon Football Stadium, Incheon
Attendance: 14,434
Referee: Kim Yong-woo
6 October 2024
15:00 UTC+9

Jeju United	2–1	Daejeon Hana Citizen
Yuri 45'; Kim Ju-gong 90+1'		Lim Chai-min 35' (o.g.)

Jeju World Cup Stadium, Seogwipo, Jeju Province
Attendance: 6,766
Referee: Ko Hyung-jin
6 October 2024
15:00 UTC+9

Pohang Steelers	1–1	Suwon FC
An Jae-jun 43'		Ji Dong-won 90+1'

Pohang Steel Yard, Pohang
Attendance: 9,513
Referee: Shin Yong-jun

=== Matches 34–38 ===
Teams played each other once, either at home or away.

==== Final A ====
Home \ Away	GWN	GCS	PHS	SEL	SWN	USH
Gangwon FC	—	1–0	1–0	1–0	—	—
Gimcheon Sangmu	—	—	—	1–3	1–0	0–0
Pohang Steelers	—	0–3	—	—	1–1	0–2
FC Seoul	—	—	1–1	—	—	1–1
Suwon FC	4–0	—	—	0–1	—	—
Ulsan HD	2–1	—	—	—	4–2	—

Source: K League
Legend: Blue = home team win; Yellow = draw; Red = away team win.

Matchday 34 (18–20 October)
18 October 2024
19:30 UTC+9

Pohang Steelers	1–1	Suwon FC
Wanderson 33'		37' Kim Ju-yeop

Pohang Steel Yard, Pohang
Attendance: 4,611
Referee: Choi Hyeon-jae
19 October 2024
16:30 UTC+9

Gimcheon Sangmu	0–0	Ulsan HD

Gimcheon Stadium, Gimcheon
Attendance: 5,636
Referee: Chae Sang-hyeop
20 October 2024
15:00 UTC+9

Gangwon FC	1–0	FC Seoul
Kim Young-bin 46'

Gangneung Stadium, Gangneung
Attendance: 12,742
Referee: Shin Yong-jun

Matchday 35 (26–27 October)
26 October 2024
14:00 UTC+9

Gangwon FC	1–0	Gimcheon Sangmu
Yang Min-hyeok 64'

Gangneung Stadium, Gangneung
Attendance: 9,383
Referee: Jeong Dong-sik
26 October 2024
16:30 UTC+9

Suwon FC	0–1	FC Seoul
		31' Lucas

Suwon Sports Complex, Suwon
Attendance: 7,971
Referee: Kim Yong-woo
27 October 2024
14:00 UTC+9

Pohang Steelers	0–2	Ulsan HD
		33' Ko Seung-beom; 64' Joo Min-kyu

Pohang Steel Yard, Pohang
Attendance: 13,212
Referee: Kim Jong-hyeok

Matchday 36 (1–3 November)
1 November 2024
19:30 UTC+9

Ulsan HD	2–1	Gangwon FC
Ludwigson 36'; Joo Min-kyu 54'		59' Lee Sang-heon

Ulsan Stadium, Ulsan
Attendance: 13,438
Referee: Ko Hyung-jin
2 November 2024
16:30 UTC+9

FC Seoul	1–1	Pohang Steelers
Kang Sang-woo 32'		36' Wanderson

Seoul World Cup Stadium, Seoul
Attendance: 29,377
Referee: Kim Dae-yong
2 November 2024
16:30 UTC+9

Gimcheon Sangmu	1–0	Suwon FC
Mo Jae-hyeon 21'

Gimcheon Stadium, Gimcheon
Attendance: 1,910
Referee: Shin Yong-jun

Matchday 37 (9-10 November)
9 November 2024
16:30 UTC+9

Suwon FC	4–0	Gangwon FC
Jeong Seung-won 5'; Kim Tae-han 41'; Jung Seung-bae 68'; Anderson 75'

Suwon Sports Complex, Suwon
Attendance: 6,778
Referee: Park Byeong-jin
10 November 2024
14:00 UTC+9

FC Seoul	1–1	Ulsan HD
Lingard 62'		45+3' Ko Seung-beom

Seoul World Cup Stadium, Seoul
Attendance: 37,288
Referee: Kim Woo-sung
10 November 2024
14:00 UTC+9

Pohang Steelers	0–3	Gimcheon Sangmu
		47' Lee Dong-gyeong; 52' Seo Min-woo; 71' Kim Seung-sub

Pohang Steel Yard, Pohang
Attendance: 8,632
Referee: Kim Hee-gon

Matchday 38 (23 November)
23 November 2024
14:00 UTC+9

Ulsan HD	4–2	Suwon FC
Yago 4' (pen.); Kim Min-jun 52'; Esaka 84'; Park Chu-young 90'		43', 63' Jeong Seung-won

Ulsan Munsu Football Stadium, Ulsan
Attendance: 24,096
Referee: Lee Dong-jun
23 November 2024
14:00 UTC+9

Gimcheon Sangmu	1–3	FC Seoul
Yu Kang-hyun 71'		46' Cho Young-wook; 62' Lim Sang-hyub; 90+1' Ronaldo Tavares

Gimcheon Stadium, Gimcheon
Attendance: 5,943
Referee: Kim Jong-hyeok
23 November 2024
14:00 UTC+9

Gangwon FC	1–0	Pohang Steelers
Yang Min-hyeok 35'

Gangneung Stadium, Gangneung
Attendance: 11,426
Referee: Kim Woo-sung

==== Final B ====
Home \ Away	DGU	DHC	GJU	ICU	JJU	JHM
Daegu FC	—	—	—	1–3	2–2	—
Daejeon Hana Citizen	1–0	—	—	—	2–1	—
Gwangju FC	1–1	0–0	—	—	—	1–1
Incheon United	—	1–2	1–0	—	1–2	—
Jeju United	—	—	0–0	—	—	1–0
Jeonbuk Hyundai Motors	3–1	0–2	—	0–0	—	—

Source: K League
Legend: Blue = home team win; Yellow = draw; Red = away team win.

Matchday 34 (18–20 October)
18 October 2024
19:30 UTC+9

Gwangju FC	1–1	Daegu FC
Byeon Jun-soo 78'		Edgar 85'

Gwangju Football Stadium, Gwangju
Attendance: 2,447
Referee: Kim Dae-yong
19 October 2024
14:00 UTC+9

Jeonbuk Hyundai Motors	0–2	Daejeon Hana Citizen
		Kim Jun-beom 42', 90+4'

Jeonju World Cup Stadium, Jeonju
Attendance: 18,261
Referee: Kim Jong-hyeok
19 October 2024
16:30 UTC+9

Incheon United	1–2	Jeju United
Gerso 69'		Jefferson Galego 50'; Italo 88'

Incheon Football Stadium, Incheon
Attendance: 7,138
Referee: Kim Woo-sung

Matchday 35 (26-27 October)
27 October 2024
14:00 UTC+9

Daejeon Hana Citizen	1–0	Daegu FC
Ishida 24'

Daejeon World Cup Stadium, Daejeon
Attendance: 13,405
Referee: Ko Hyung-jin
27 October 2024
16:30 UTC+9

Incheon United	1–0	Gwangju FC
Mugoša 25'

Incheon Football Stadium, Incheon
Attendance: 8,257
Referee: Chae Sang-hyeop
27 October 2024
16:30 UTC+9

Jeju United	1–0	Jeonbuk Hyundai Motors
Song Ju-hun 70'

Jeju World Cup Stadium, Seogwipo, Jeju Province
Attendance: 6,376
Referee: Kim Hee-gon

Matchday 36 (1–3 November)
2 November 2024
14:00 UTC+9

Jeonbuk Hyundai Motors	0–0	Incheon United

Jeonju World Cup Stadium, Jeonju
Attendance: 18,244
Referee: Lee Dong-jun
2 November 2024
16:30 UTC+9

Gwangju FC	0–0	Daejeon Hana Citizen

Gwangju Football Stadium, Gwangju
Attendance: 4,666
Referee: Park Byeong-jin
3 November 2024
14:00 UTC+9

Daegu FC	2–2	Jeju United
Barcellos 41'; Jang Seong-won 57'		Kim Ju-gong 53', 88'

DGB Daegu Bank Park, Daegu
Attendance: 11,940
Referee: Kim Yong-woo

Matchday 37 (10 November)
10 November 2024
16:30 UTC+9

Incheon United	1–2	Daejeon Hana Citizen
Gerso 45'		Ishida 6'; Krivotsyuk 15'

Incheon Football Stadium, Incheon
Attendance: 14,633
Referee: Kim Yong-woo
10 November 2024
16:30 UTC+9

Jeju United	0–0	Gwangju FC

Jeju World Cup Stadium, Seogwipo, Jeju Province
Attendance: 7,651
Referee: Jeong Dong-sik
10 November 2024
16:30 UTC+9

Jeonbuk Hyundai Motors	3–1	Daegu FC
Kim Jin-gyu 69'; Kwon Chang-hoon 85'; Lee Seung-woo 89'		Hwang Jae-won 90+6' (pen.)

Jeonju World Cup Stadium, Jeonju
Attendance: 18,985
Referee: Kim Jong-hyeok

Matchday 38 (24 November)
24 November 2024
14:00 UTC+9

Gwangju FC	1–1	Jeonbuk Hyundai Motors
Sin Chang-moo 90+3' (pen.)		75' Tiago

Gwangju Football Stadium, Gwangju
Attendance: 7,957
Referee: Ko Hyung-jin
24 November 2024
14:00 UTC+9

Daegu FC	1–3	Incheon United
Park Jae-hyeon 90+5'		43', 50' Gerso; 90+8' Ji Eon-hak

DGB Daegu Bank Park, Daegu
Attendance: 11,812
Referee: Chae Sang-hyeop
24 November 2024
14:00 UTC+9

Daejeon Hana Citizen	2–1	Jeju United
Ishida 30'; Lim Chai-min 44' (o.g.)		Lee Ju-yong 10'

Daejeon World Cup Stadium, Daejeon
Attendance: 12,743
Referee: Shin Yong-jun

== Relegation play-offs ==
The tenth-placed team and the eleventh-placed team played the play-off winners and the runners-up of the K League 2, respectively, in the relegation play-offs.

Team 1	Agg.	Team 2	1st leg	2nd leg
Chungnam Asan	5–6	Daegu FC	4–3	1–3 (a.e.t.)
Seoul E-Land	2–4	Jeonbuk Hyundai Motors	1–2	1–2

28 November 2024
19:00 UTC+9

Chungnam Asan	4–3	Daegu FC
Park Dae-hoon 11', 44'; Juninho Rocha 14'; Denisson Silva 69'		Go Jae-hyun 45+1'; Cesinha 87', 90+4'

Cheonan Stadium, Cheonan
Attendance: 4,200
Referee: Kim Woo-sung
1 December 2024
14:00 UTC+9

Daegu FC	3–1 (a.e.t.)	Chungnam Asan
Cesinha 45+5'; Edgar 83'; Lee Chan-dong 93'		Juninho Rocha 90+8' (pen.)

DGB Daegu Bank Park, Daegu
Attendance: 11,973
Referee: Ko Hyung-jin

Daegu FC won 6–5 on aggregate and therefore both clubs remain in their respective leagues.

1 December 2024
16:00 UTC+9

Seoul E-Land	1–2	Jeonbuk Hyundai Motors
Osmar 49'		Tiago Orobó 38'; Jeon Jin-woo 83'

Mokdong Stadium, Seoul
Attendance: 13,205
Referee: Shin Yong-jun
8 December 2024
14:25 UTC+9

Jeonbuk Hyundai Motors	2–1	Seoul E-Land
Tiago Orobó 50'; Moon Seon-min 90+8'		Bruno Silva 45+1'

Jeonju World Cup Stadium, Jeonju
Attendance: 23,772
Referee: Kim Jong-hyeok

Jeonbuk Hyundai Motors won 4–2 on aggregate and therefore both clubs remain in their respective leagues.

== Statistics ==
=== Top goalscorers ===
Rank	Player	Team	Goals
1	(Montenegro) Stefan Mugoša	Incheon United	15
2	(Russia) Stanislav Iljutcenko	FC Seoul	14
3	(Brazil) Yago Cariello	Gangwon FC; Ulsan HD	13
3	(South Korea) Lee Sang-heon	Gangwon FC	13
5	(South Korea) Lee Dong-gyeong	Ulsan HD; Gimcheon Sangmu	12
5	(South Korea) Lee Seung-woo	Suwon FC; Jeonbuk Hyundai Motors	12
5	(South Korea) Yang Min-hyeok	Gangwon FC	12
8	(Brazil) Cesinha	Daegu FC	11
8	(South Korea) Jeong Seung-won	Suwon FC	11
10	(South Korea) Joo Min-kyu	Ulsan HD	10

=== Top assist providers ===
Rank	Player	Team	Assists
1	(Brazil) Anderson Oliveira	Suwon FC	13
2	(South Korea) Kim Dae-won	Gimcheon Sangmu	8
2	(Brazil) Cesinha	Daegu FC	8
4	(South Korea) Hwang Mun-ki	Gangwon FC	7
5	(South Korea) Lee Dong-gyeong	Ulsan HD; Gimcheon Sangmu	6
5	(South Korea) Song Min-kyu	Jeonbuk Hyundai Motors	6
5	(South Korea) Lee Seung-woo	Suwon FC; Jeonbuk Hyundai Motors	6
5	(South Korea) Lee Sang-heon	Gangwon FC	6
5	(South Korea) Jeong Seung-won	Suwon FC	6
5	(South Korea) Yang Min-hyeok	Gangwon FC	6

=== Hat-tricks ===
Player	For	Against	Result	Date
(Brazil) Yago Cariello	Gangwon FC	Incheon United	4–1	21 April 2024
(South Korea) Jeong Jae-hee	Pohang Steelers	Gangwon FC	4–2	1 May 2024

== Awards ==
=== Weekly awards ===
Round	Player of the Round	
Round	Player	Club
1	(Brazil) Gabriel Tigrão	Gwangju FC
2	(South Korea) Lee Dong-gyeong	Ulsan HD
3	(South Korea) Ki Sung-yueng	FC Seoul
4	(South Korea) Lee Joong-min	Gimcheon Sangmu
5	(Russia) Stanislav Iljutcenko	FC Seoul
6	(South Korea) Jung Chi-in	Gimcheon Sangmu
7	(South Korea) Joo Min-kyu	Ulsan HD
8	(Brazil) Yago Cariello	Gangwon FC
9	(South Korea) Lee Dong-gyeong	Ulsan HD
10	(South Korea) Jeong Jae-hee	Pohang Steelers
11	(South Korea) Jo Hyeon-woo	Ulsan HD
12	(Brazil) Cesinha	Daegu FC
13	(South Korea) Kim Tae-hyun	Gimcheon Sangmu
14	(Sweden) Gustav Ludwigson	Ulsan HD
15	(South Korea) Kim Dong-jun	Jeju United
16	(Brazil) Anderson Oliveira	Suwon FC
17	(South Korea) Lee Sang-heon	Gangwon FC
18	(Brazil) Cesinha	Daegu FC
19	(Sweden) Darijan Bojanić	Ulsan HD

Round	Player of the Round	
Round	Player	Club
20	(South Korea) Han Seung-gyu	FC Seoul
21	(South Korea) Seo Jin-su	Jeju United
22	(Brazil) Oberdan	Pohang Steelers
23	(South Korea) Maeng Seong-ung	Gimcheon Sangmu
24	(South Korea) Yang Min-hyeok	Gangwon FC
25	(South Korea) Kim Kyung-min	Gangwon FC
26	(South Korea) Lee Sang-heon	Gangwon FC
27	(Brazil) Cesinha	Daegu FC
28	(Brazil) Anderson Oliveira	Suwon FC
29	(South Korea) Lee Chang-geun	Daejeon Hana Citizen
30	(Brazil) Andrigo	Jeonbuk Hyundai Motors
31	(Brazil) Jorge Teixeira	Pohang Steelers
32	(South Korea) Jo Hyeon-woo	Ulsan HD
33	(South Korea) Lee Sang-heon	Gangwon FC
34	(South Korea) Kim Jun-beom	Daejeon Hana Citizen
35	(Montenegro) Stefan Mugoša	Incheon United
36	(South Korea) Joo Min-kyu	Ulsan HD
37	(South Korea) Kwon Chang-hoon	Jeonbuk Hyundai Motors
38	(South Korea) Cho Young-wook	FC Seoul

=== Monthly awards ===
Month	Player of the Month		Young Player of the Month		Goal of the Month	
Month	Player	Club	Player	Club	Player	Club
March	(South Korea) Lee Dong-gyeong	Ulsan	(South Korea) Park Seung-ho	Incheon	(South Korea) Lee Seung-woo	Suwon FC
April	(South Korea) Lee Dong-gyeong	Ulsan	(South Korea) Yang Min-hyeok	Gangwon	(South Korea) Jeon Byung-kwan	Jeonbuk
May	(South Korea) Lee Seung-woo	Suwon FC	(South Korea) Yang Min-hyeok	Gangwon	(South Korea) Jang Seong-won	Daegu
June	(Brazil) Anderson Oliveira	Suwon FC	(South Korea) Yang Min-hyeok	Gangwon	(Brazil) Cesinha	Daegu
July	(South Korea) Yang Min-hyeok	Gangwon	(South Korea) Yang Min-hyeok	Gangwon	(South Korea) Yang Min-hyeok	Gangwon
August	(Brazil) Anderson Oliveira	Suwon FC	(South Korea) Hwang Jae-won	Daegu	(South Korea) Kim Jae-woo	Daejeon
September	(Brazil) Cesinha	Daegu	(South Korea) Kim Geon-hee	Incheon	(South Korea) Kim Jin-gyu	Jeonbuk
October	(South Korea) Ko Seung-beom	Ulsan	(South Korea) Yang Min-hyeok	Gangwon	(Brazil) Wanderson	Pohang

Month	Manager of the Month			Save of the Month	
Month	Manager	Club	Div.	Player	Club
March	(South Korea) Park Tae-ha	Pohang	1	(South Korea) Jo Hyeon-woo	Ulsan
April	(South Korea) Yeom Ki-hun	Suwon	2	(South Korea) Jo Hyeon-woo	Ulsan
May	(South Korea) Yoon Jong-hwan	Gangwon	1	(South Korea) Jeong Min-ki	Jeonbuk
June	(South Korea) Chung Jung-yong	Gimcheon	1	(South Korea) Kim Dong-jun	Jeju
July	(South Korea) Yoon Jong-hwan	Gangwon	1	(South Korea) Kim Jeong-hoon	Jeonbuk
August	(South Korea) Kim Gi-dong	Seoul	1	(South Korea) Kang Hyeon-mu	Seoul
September	(South Korea) Kim Hyun-seok	Chungnam Asan	2	(South Korea) Kang Hyeon-mu	Seoul
October	(South Korea) Yoon Jong-hwan	Gangwon	1	(South Korea) Kang Hyeon-mu	Seoul

=== Annual awards ===
The 2024 K League Awards was held on 29 November 2024.

Award	Winner	Club
Most Valuable Player	(South Korea) Jo Hyeon-woo	Ulsan HD
Young Player of the Year	(South Korea) Yang Min-hyeok	Gangwon FC
Top goalscorer	(Montenegro) Stefan Mugoša	Incheon United
Top assist provider	(Brazil) Anderson Oliveira	Suwon FC
Manager of the Year	(South Korea) Yoon Jong-hwan	Gangwon FC

Position	Best XI			
Goalkeeper	(South Korea) Jo Hyeon-woo (Ulsan)			
Defenders	(South Korea) Hwang Mun-ki (Gangwon)	(South Korea) Kim Kee-hee (Ulsan)	(South Korea) Park Seung-wook (Gimcheon)	(South Korea) Lee Myung-jae (Ulsan)
Midfielders	(South Korea) Yang Min-hyeok (Gangwon)	(Brazil) Oberdan (Pohang)	(South Korea) Ko Seung-beom (Ulsan)	(Brazil) Anderson Oliveira (Suwon FC)
Forwards	(South Korea) Lee Sang-heon (Gangwon)		(South Korea) Lee Dong-gyeong (Ulsan, Gimcheon)	

== Attendance ==
Attendants who entered with free ticket are not counted.

Pos	Team	Total	High	Low	Average	Change
1	FC Seoul	501,091	52,600	13,040	27,838	+22.8%
2	Ulsan HD	353,615	29,007	9,444	18,611	+2.2%
3	Jeonbuk Hyundai Motors	295,642	25,782	5,560	16,425	+30.7%
4	Daegu FC	213,982	12,133	7,152	11,262	+2.7%
5	Incheon United	208,045	15,422	6,164	10,950	+22.5%
6	Daejeon Hana Citizen	187,199	18,473	4,759	9,853	−23.4%
7	Pohang Steelers	189,718	13,467	4,611	9,486	+9.7%
8	Gangwon FC	173,929	13,170	3,056	9,154	+41.7%
9	Jeju United	120,924	12,409	3,044	6,364	+6.0%
10	Suwon FC	100,738	9,557	2,328	5,597	+7.9%
11	Gwangju FC	98,244	8,091	1,562	4,912	+0.4%
12	Gimcheon Sangmu	65,458	5,943	1,085	3,445	+191.0%^{†}
	League total	2,508,585	52,600	1,085	11,003	+2.5%

Updated to games played on 18 August 2024
Source: K League
Notes:
^{†} Teams that played previous season in K League 2.

== See also ==
- 2024 in South Korean football
- 2024 Korean FA Cup
- 2024 K League 2
