= Kim Hyeon-uk =

Kim Hyeon-uk may refer to:

- Kim Hyeon-uk (footballer) (born 1995), South Korean footballer
- Kim Hyeon-uk (table tennis) (born 1995), South Korean para table tennis player
