= Hwang Jae-won (footballer, born 2002) =

South Korean footballer (born 2002)

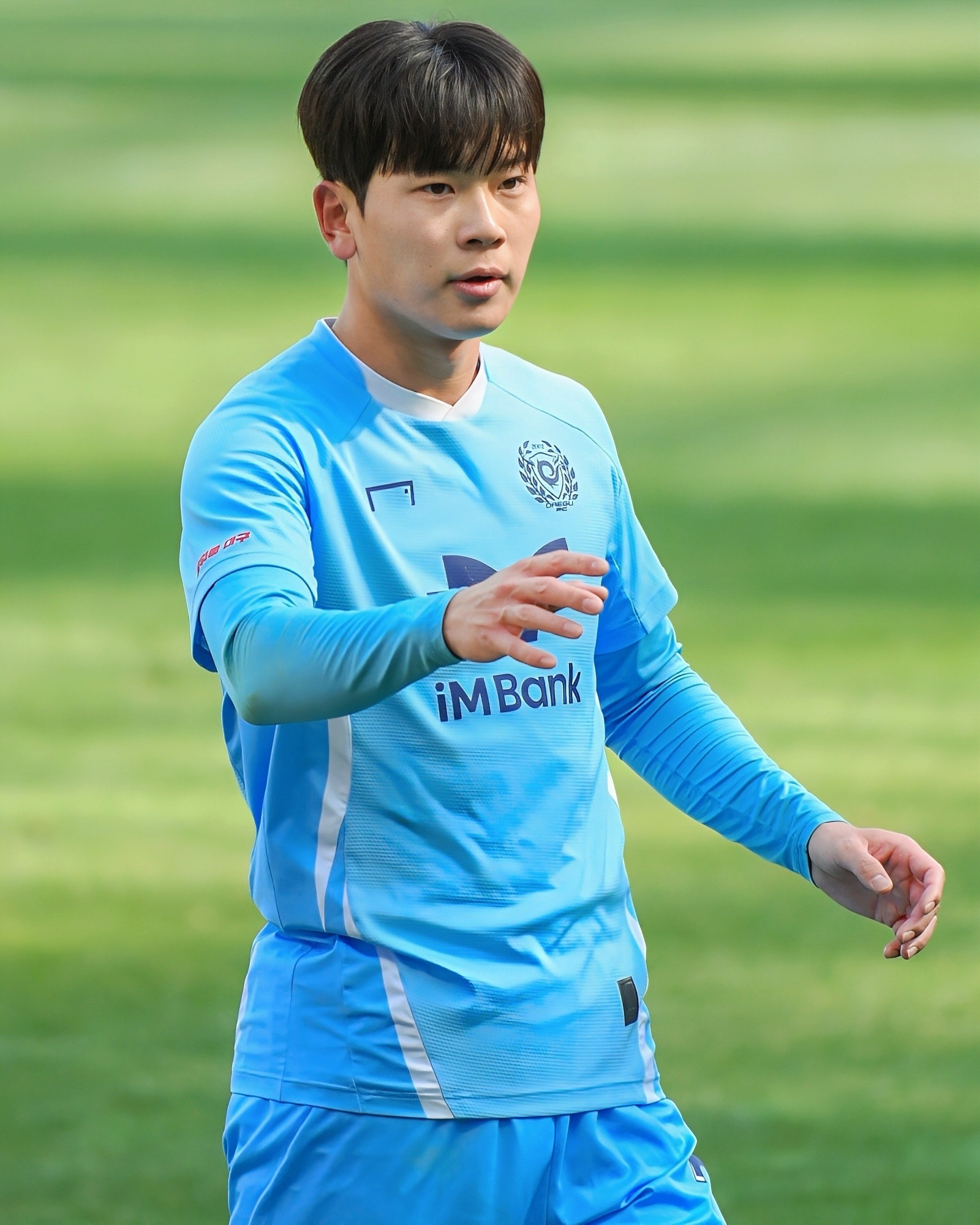
- Hwang playing for Daegu FC in 2025

Personal information
- Date of birth: 16 August 2002 (age 24)
- Place of birth: Boryeong, Chungnam, South Korea
- Height: 1.80 m (5 ft 11 in)
- Positions: Right-back; midfielder

Team information
- Current team: Daegu FC
- Number: 2

Youth career
- Suwon FC
- Gwacheon High School

College career
Years	Team	Apps	(Gls)
2021	Hongik University		

Senior career*
Years	Team	Apps	(Gls)
2022–	Daegu FC	152	(5)

International career^{‡}
2022–	South Korea U23	10	(0)
2024–	South Korea	3	(0)
Medal record
Men's football
Representing South Korea
Asian Games
Gold medal – first place	2022 Hangzhou
WAFF U-23 Championship
Winner	2024 Saudi Arabia
- * Club domestic league appearances and goals as of 5 August 2026 ‡ National team caps and goals as of 15 January 2025

- Hwang Jae-won
- Hangul: 황재원
- RR: Hwang Jaewon
- MR: Hwang Chaewŏn

Hwang Jae-won (Korean: 황재원; born 16 August 2002) is a South Korean footballer who plays as a right-back for Daegu FC and the South Korea national team.

== Youth career ==
As a youth, Hwang played for Suwon FC's youth academy before transferring to Gwacheon High School. After graduating from high school, he entered Hongik University where he played under Park Chang-hyun.

== Club career ==
=== Daegu FC ===
On 5 January 2022, Hwang was signed to K League 1 side Daegu FC and made his professional career debut at the opening match of the 2022 season. In an away match against Pohang Steelers on 5 May, he scored his first goal after receiving an assist from his own goalkeeper. He also won the K League Young Player of the Month award for May. In addition to league play, he made two assists in six matches of the 2022 AFC Champions League and was on the list of four right-backs, who were nominated for the Best XI of the tournament. During the 2022 season, he had one goal and five assists in 43 appearances.

In May 2023, Hwang won the K League Young Player of the Month award for the second time. On 10 June, he made one goal and one assist, leading his club to a 3–1 home win against Suwon FC.

Hwang spent the 2024 season with Park Chang-hyun, the new manager of Daegu and his college manager. On 24 August, he scored the winning goal in a 2–1 away win over Pohang Steelers. In an interview, he described this goal as the first proper goal in his career at Daegu.

== International career ==
In September 2022, Hwang started to be called up to the South Korea under-23 team. He participated in two friendly matches against China in June 2023. In July 2023, he was named to the final roster of the under-23 team for the 2022 Asian Games. He was the youngest member of the squad and played as a starting right defender in six games. In the 2–1 final win over Japan, he provided an assist for Jeong Woo-yeong's header goal and was involved in a build-up play followed by Cho Young-wook's winning goal. His gold medal at the Asian Games exempted him from mandatory military service.

On 27 May 2024, Hwang was called up to the South Korea national team by caretaker manager Kim Do-hoon for the 2026 FIFA World Cup qualifiers in June. On 6 June, he made his senior international debut as a starting right-back in a 7–0 win over Singapore. He expressed disappointment at his performance after playing for 70 minutes in the match. In a 1–0 win over China on 11 June, he came off the bench and played for 30 minutes.

== Career statistics ==
As of 5 August 2026

Appearances and goals by club, season and competition
Club	Season	League			Cup		Continental		Other		Total	
Club	Season	Division	Apps	Goals	Apps	Goals	Apps	Goals	Apps	Goals	Apps	Goals
Daegu FC	2022	K League 1	34	1	2	0	7 (Note: Appearances in AFC Champions League)	0	—		43	1
Daegu FC	2023	K League 1	33	1	0	0	—		—		33	1
Daegu FC	2024	K League 1	31	2	0	0	—		2 (Note: Appearances in K League promotion-relegation play-offs)	0	33	2
Daegu FC	2025	K League 1	35	0	2	0	—		—		37	0
Daegu FC	2026	K League 2	19	1	0	0	—		—		19	1
Career total			152	5	4	0	7	0	2	0	165	5

== Honours ==
South Korea U23

- Asian Games: 2022
- WAFF U-23 Championship: 2024

Individual

- K League Young Player of the Month: May 2022, May 2023, August 2024
- Korean FA Young Player of the Year: 2023
