= Kim Tae-hyun (footballer) =

South Korean footballer (born 1996)

Personal information
- Date of birth: December 19, 1996 (age 29)
- Place of birth: Daejeon, South Korea
- Height: 1.75 m (5 ft 9 in)
- Position: Full-back

Team information
- Current team: Jeonbuk Hyundai Motors
- Number: 77

Senior career*
Years	Team	Apps	(Gls)
2018	Ansan Greeners	18	(0)
2019	Seoul E-Land	11	(0)
2020	Ansan Greeners	25	(2)
2021–2024	Jeonnam Dragons	66	(1)
2023–2024	→ Gimcheon Sangmu (draft)	34	(2)
2024	→ Jeonbuk Hyundai Motors (loan)	13	(0)
2025–	Jeonbuk Hyundai Motors	49	(0)

International career^{‡}
2025–	South Korea	3	(0)
Korean name
Hangul	김태현
Hanja	金泰賢
RR	Gim Taehyeon
MR	Kim T'aehyŏn
- * Club domestic league appearances and goals as of 8 November 2026 ‡ National team caps and goals as of 6 October 2026

Kim Tae-hyun (Korean: 김태현; born December 19, 1996) is a South Korean professional footballer who plays as an full-back playing for Jeonbuk Hyundai Motors of the K League 1 and the South Korea national team.

== Career ==
On July 31, 2024, Jeonbuk Hyundai Motors acquired Kim Tae-hyun from Jeonnam Dragons. Kim Tae-hyun, who made his professional debut in Ansan Greeners in 2018, transferred to Seoul E-Land FC and Jeonnam Dragons in 2021. In the 2021 season, Kim Tae-hyun played in 30 games for Jeonnam Dragons, playing as a key player for the team, and led the team to win the FA Cup that year, earning a spot in the AFC Champions League.

== Career statistics ==
=== Club ===
As of 8 November 2026.

Club	Season	League			Cup		Continental		Other		Total	
Club	Season	Division	Apps	Goals	Apps	Goals	Apps	Goals	Apps	Goals	Apps	Goals
Ansan Greeners	2018	K League 2	18	0	0	0	—		—		18	0
Seoul E-Land	2019	K League 2	11	0	0	0	—		—		11	0
Ansan Greeners	2020	K League 2	25	2	1	0	—		—		26	2
Jeonnam Dragons	2021	K League 2	29	0	6	0	—		1 (Note: Appearance in K League promotion-relegation play-offs)	0	36	0
Jeonnam Dragons	2022	K League 2	37	1	1	0	4 (Note: Appearances in AFC Champions League Elite)	0	—		42	1
Jeonnam Dragons	Total		66	1	7	0	4	0	1	0	78	1
Gimcheon Sangmu (draft)	2023	K League 2	21	0	1	0	—		—		22	0
Gimcheon Sangmu (draft)	2024	K League 1	13	2	1	0	—		—		14	2
Gimcheon Sangmu (draft)	Total		34	2	2	0	—		—		36	2
Jeonbuk Hyundai Motors (loan)	2024	K League 1	13	0	0	0	—		2	0	15	0
Jeonbuk Hyundai Motors	2025	K League 1	28	0	5	0	3 (Note: Appearances in AFC Champions League Two)	0	—		36	0
Jeonbuk Hyundai Motors	2026	K League 1	21	0	1	0	3	0	1 (Note: Appearance in K League Super Cup)	0	26	0
Jeonbuk Hyundai Motors	Total		49	0	6	0	6	0	1	0	62	0
Career total			216	5	16	0	10	0	4	0	246	5

== Honours ==
Jeonnam Dragons

- Korean FA Cup: 2021

Gimcheon Sangmu

- K League 2: 2023

Jeonbuk Hyundai Motors

- K League 1: 2025
- Korean FA Cup: 2025
- K League Super Cup: 2026
