= Anderson Oliveira (footballer, born 1998) =

Brazilian footballer

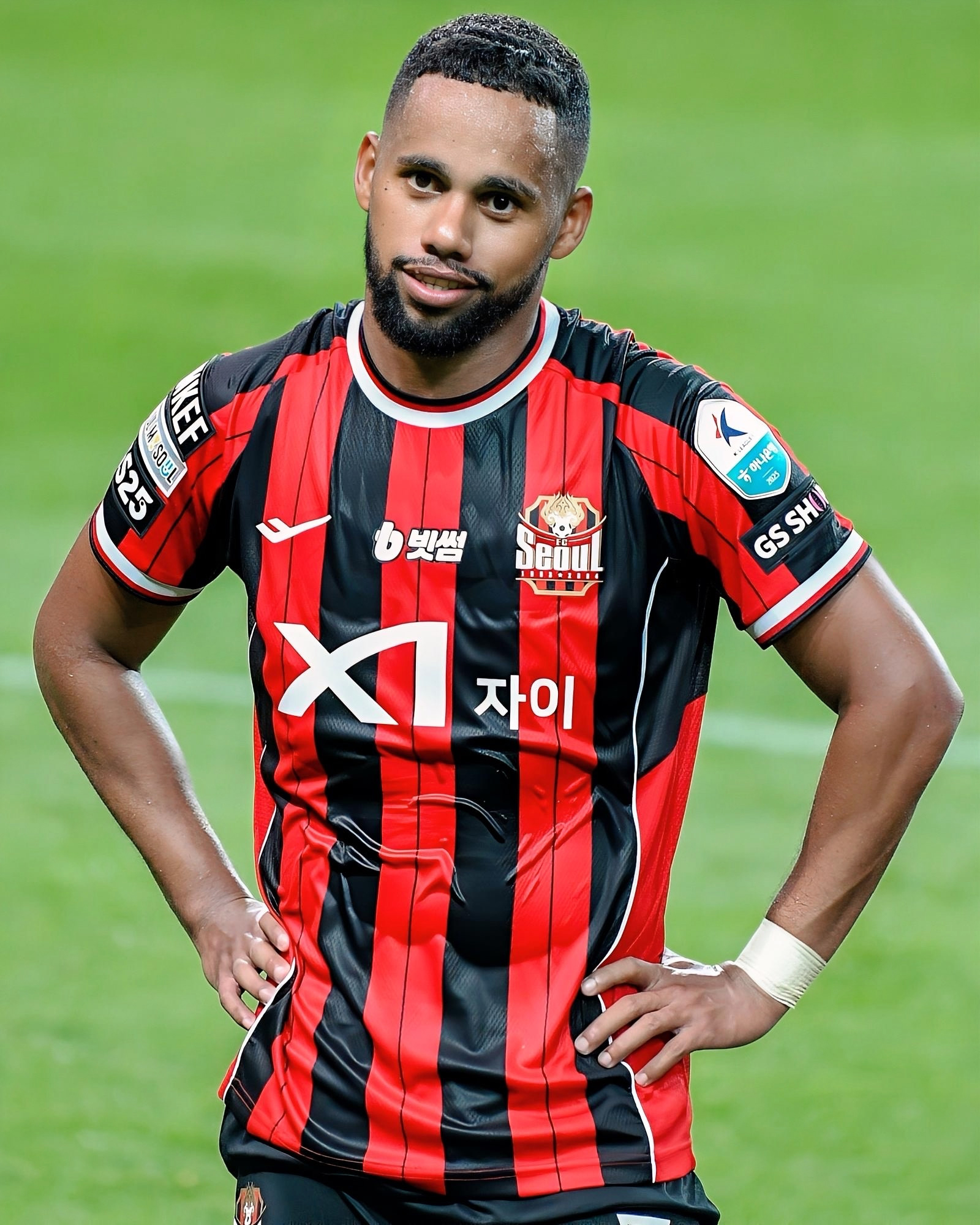
- Oliveira with FC Seoul in 2025

Personal information
- Full name: Anderson de Oliveira da Silva
- Date of birth: 16 July 1998 (age 28)
- Place of birth: Sinop, Brazil
- Height: 1.69 m (5 ft 7 in)
- Position: Forward

Team information
- Current team: FC Seoul
- Number: 10

Senior career*
Years	Team	Apps	(Gls)
2018–2019	Londrina	30	(4)
2019–2023	Portimonense	66	(2)
2023–2024	Goiás	22	(0)
2024–2025	Suwon FC	58	(12)
2025–	FC Seoul	33	(2)
- * Club domestic league appearances and goals as of 3 August 2026

Anderson de Oliveira da Silva (born 16 July 1998), known as Anderson Oliveira, is a Brazilian professional footballer who plays as a forward for K League 1 club FC Seoul.

== Career ==
Oliveira made his professional debut with Londrina in a 1–0 Campeonato Brasileiro Série B loss to Juventude on 8 June 2018. On 14 June 2019, he joined Portimonense in the Primeira Liga.

== Honours ==
FC Seoul

- K League 1: 2026

Individual

- K League 1 Best XI: 2024
