= Kim Jae-woo =

South Korean footballer (born 1998)

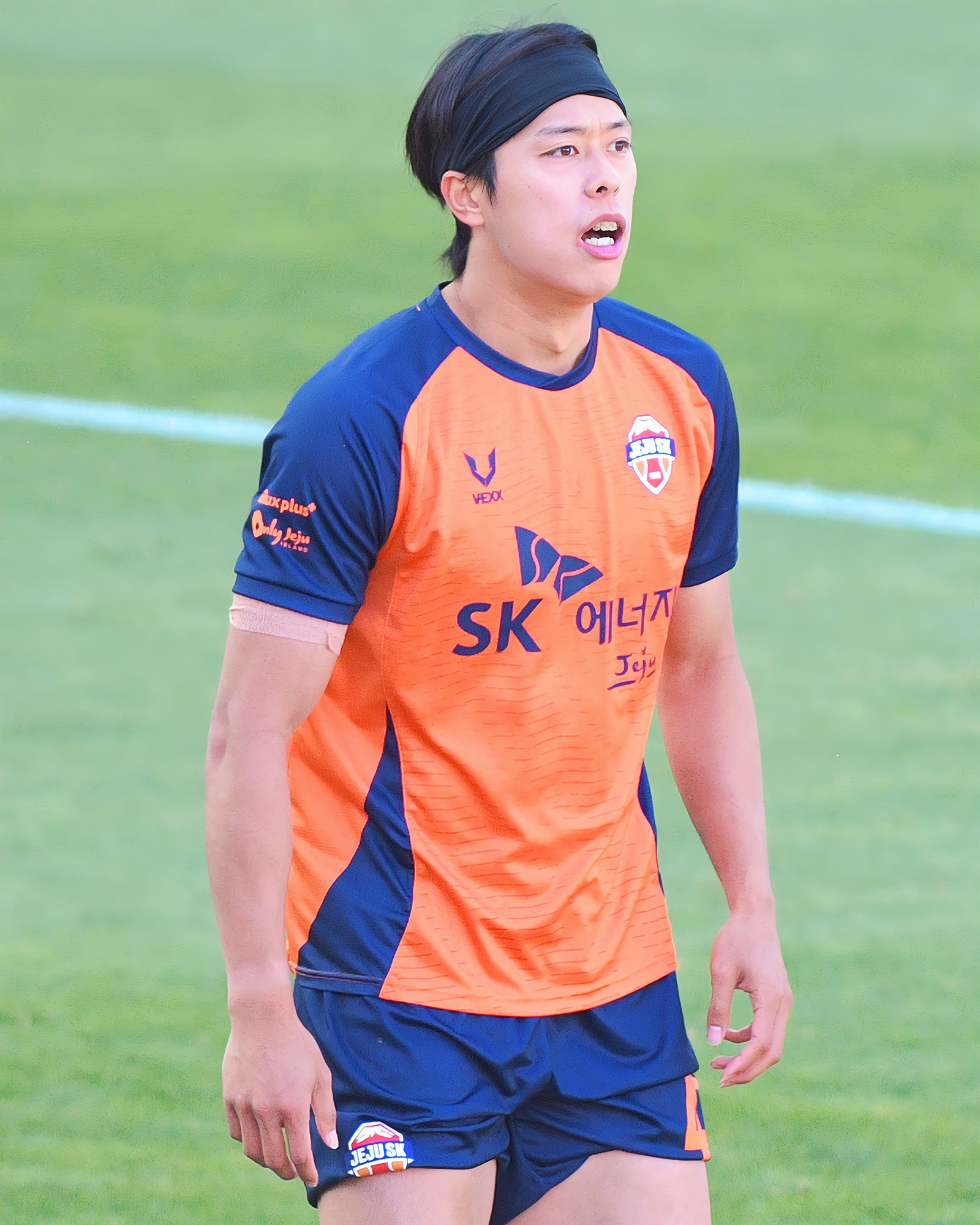
- Kim in 2026

Personal information
- Date of birth: 6 February 1998 (age 28)
- Place of birth: South Korea
- Height: 1.90 m (6 ft 3 in)
- Position: Defender

Team information
- Current team: Jeju SK
- Number: 41

Senior career*
Years	Team	Apps	(Gls)
2016–2017	SV Horn	10	(0)
2018–2019	Bucheon FC 1995	26	(1)
2020–2021	Daegu FC	30	(0)
2022–2024	Daejeon Hana Citizen	20	(2)
2023–2024	→ Gimcheon Sangmu (Army)	38	(1)
2025–	Jeju SK	22	(0)

International career^{‡}
2017	South Korea U-20	0	(0)
2019–2021	South Korea U-23	13 (Note: Includes one appearance against another KFA team.)	(1)
Medal record
Representing South Korea
Men's football
AFC U-23 Championship
Gold medal – first place	2020 Thailand
- * Club domestic league appearances and goals as of 3 August 2026 ‡ National team caps and goals as of 31 July 2021

Kim Jae-woo (Korean: 김재우; born 6 February 1998) is a South Korean footballer currently playing for Jeju SK in K League 1.

== Career statistics ==
=== Club ===
As of 9 September 2024

Appearances and goals by club, season and competition
Club	Season	League			National Cup		Continental		Other		Total	
Club	Season	Division	Apps	Goals	Apps	Goals	Apps	Goals	Apps	Goals	Apps	Goals
SV Horn	2016-17	Austrian Football First League	15	0	—		—		—		15	0
SV Horn	2017-18	Austrian Regionalliga	8	0	1	0	—		—		9	0
SV Horn	Total		23	0	1	0	—		—		24	0
Bucheon 1995	2018	K League 2	1	0	—		—		—		1	0
Bucheon 1995	2019	K League 2	25	1	—		—		—		25	1
Bucheon 1995	Total		26	1	—		—		—		26	1
Daegu	2020	K League 1	11	0	1	0	—		—		12	0
Daegu	2021	K League 1	19	0	4	0	0	0	—		23	0
Daegu	Total		30	0	5	0	0	0	—		35	0
Daejeon Hana Citizen	2022	K League 2	15	1	—		—		2 (Note: Appearance(s) in promotion/relegation play-off)	0	17	1
Daejeon Hana Citizen	2024	K League 1	4	1	—		—		—		4	1
Daejeon Hana Citizen	Total		19	2	—		—		2	0	21	2
Gimcheon Sangmu (Army)	2023	K League 2	33	1	—		—		—		33	1
Gimcheon Sangmu (Army)	2024	K League 1	5	0	0	0	—		—		5	0
Gimcheon Sangmu (Army)	Total		38	1	0	0	—		—		38	1
Career Total			136	4	6	0	0	0	2	0	144	4

== Honours ==
=== International ===
South Korea U23

- AFC U-23 Championship: 2020
