= Kim Dong-heon (footballer) =

South Korean footballer (born 1997)

Personal information
- Date of birth: 3 March 1997 (age 29)
- Place of birth: Incheon, South Korea
- Height: 1.86 m (6 ft 1 in)
- Position: Goalkeeper

Team information
- Current team: Incheon United
- Number: 1

Youth career
- 2010–2012: Kwangsung Middle School
- 2013–2015: Incheon Daegeon High School

College career
Years	Team	Apps	(Gls)
2016–2018	Yongin University		

Senior career*
Years	Team	Apps	(Gls)
2019–	Incheon United	83	(0)
2024–2025	→ Gimcheon Sangmu (draft)	34	(0)
Korean name
Hangul	김동헌
RR	Gim Dongheon
MR	Kim Tonghŏn
- * Club domestic league appearances and goals as of 16 May 2026

Kim Dong-heon (Korean: 김동헌; born 3 March 1997) is a South Korean professional footballer who plays as a goalkeeper for Incheon United.

== Club career ==
In 2019, Kim Dong-heon signed a professional contract with Incheon United.

He returned to Incheon United after completing his military service at Gimcheon Sangmu in June 2025.

== Career statistics ==
As of 16 May 2026

Appearances and goals by club, season and competition
Club	Season	League			Cup		Continental		Other		Total	
Club	Season	Division	Apps	Goals	Apps	Goals	Apps	Goals	Apps	Goals	Apps	Goals
Incheon United	2019	K League 1	0	0	0	0	—		—		0	0
Incheon United	2020	K League 1	3	0	1	0	—		—		4	0
Incheon United	2021	K League 1	13	0	1	0	—		—		14	0
Incheon United	2022	K League 1	25	0	0	0	—		—		25	0
Incheon United	2023	K League 1	24	0	3	0	7	0	—		34	0
Incheon United	2025	K League 2	7	0	—		—		—		7	0
Incheon United	2026	K League 1	11	0	0	0	—		—		11	0
Incheon United	Total		83	0	5	0	7	0	—		95	0
Gimcheon Sangmu (draft)	2024	K League 1	17	0	2	0	—		—		19	0
Gimcheon Sangmu (draft)	2025	K League 1	17	0	0	0	—		—		17	0
Gimcheon Sangmu (draft)	Total		34	0	2	0	—		—		36	0
Career total			117	0	7	0	7	0	0	0	131	0

== Honours ==
Incheon United

- K League 2: 2025
