= Jang Seong-won =

South Korean footballer

Personal information
- Date of birth: 17 June 1997 (age 29)
- Place of birth: South Korea
- Height: 1.80 m (5 ft 11 in)
- Position: Midfielder

Team information
- Current team: Daegu
- Number: 22

Youth career
- –2017: Hannam University

Senior career*
Years	Team	Apps	(Gls)
2018–	Daegu FC	155	(4)
- * Club domestic league appearances and goals as of 5 January 2026

- Jang Seong-won
- Hangul: 장성원
- Hanja: 張成元
- RR: Jang Seongwon
- MR: Chang Sŏngwŏn

Jang Seong-won (Korean: 장성원; born 17 June 1997) is a South Korean football midfielder, who plays for Daegu FC in the K League 1.

== Club career ==
Born on 17 June 1997, Jang played his youth football for Hannam University. He transferred to Daegu FC in January 2018, and made his debut for the club on 8 August 2018, playing against Yangpyeong in a Korean FA Cup match. He played his first K League 1 match on 30 September 2018, against the Pohang Steelers.

== Club career statistics ==
As of 5 January 2026

Club performance			League		Cup		Continental		Total	
Season	Club	League	Apps	Goals	Apps	Goals	Apps	Goals	Apps	Goals
South Korea			League		KFA Cup		Asia		Total	
2018	Daegu FC	K League 1	9	0	5	0	-		14	0
2019	Daegu FC	K League 1	18	0	1	0	5	0	24	0
2020	Daegu FC	K League 1	2	0	1	0	-		3	0
2021	Daegu FC	K League 1	22	0	5	0	7	0	34	0
2022	Daegu FC	K League 1	21	0	2	0	7	0	30	0
2023	Daegu FC	K League 1	29	1	0	0	-		29	1
2024	Daegu FC	K League 1	33	2	0	0	-		33	2
2025	Daegu FC	K League 1	21	1	0	0	-		21	1
Career total			155	4	14	0	19	0	178	3

== Honors and awards ==
=== Player ===
Daegu FC

- Korean FA Cup Winners (1) : 2018
