= Jeju Samdasoo =

Korean brand of mineral water

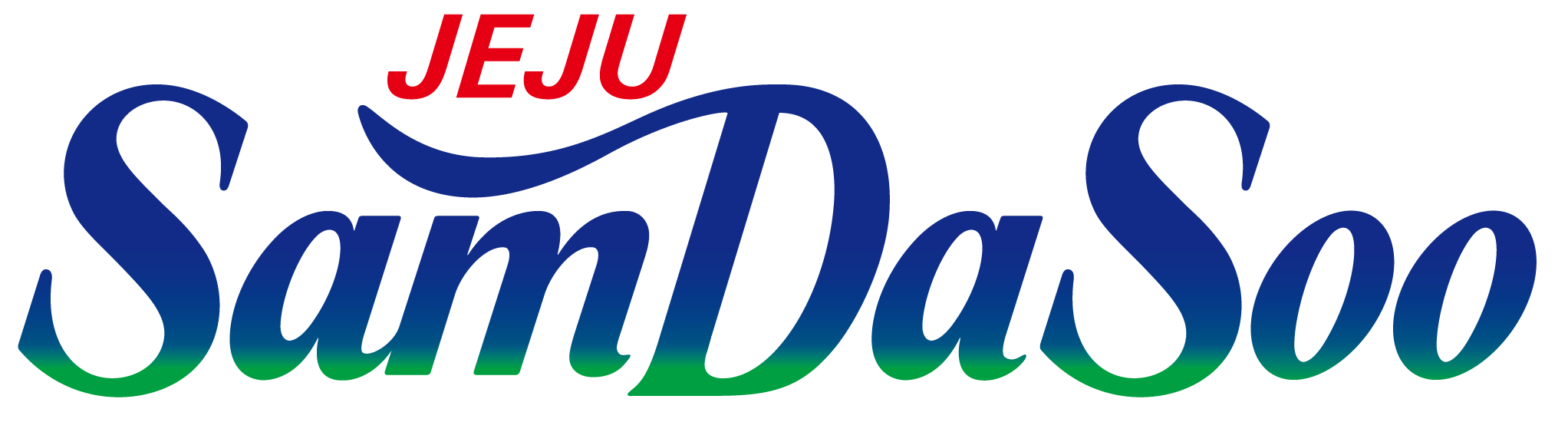
- Samdasoo logo.
- Country: South Korea
- Source: Jeju City, Jeju Province
- Manufacturer: Jeju Province Development Corporation
- Seller: Nongshim (1998 - 2012); Kwangdong Pharmaceutical (2012 - present); Jeju Province Development Corporation
- Release: 1998; 28 years ago
- Official website: www.jpdc.co.kr

Jeju Samdasoo (Korean: 제주삼다수) is a brand of mineral water produced by Jeju province development corporation, manufactured by Kwangdong Pham. It is the only volcanic bedrock water in South Korea, and the plant is located in the Gyorae-ri, Jocheon-eup, Jeju City, Jeju Province. The product has achieved annual certifications of U.S. FDA, Japan's Ministry of Health, Labor and Welfare, NSF, and ISO22000 (HACCP). Major exported regions are China, Japan, Indonesia, USA, Hong Kong and Saipan.

== History ==
In 1980s, while the private sale of bottled water was prohibited, Korean Air produced (and still continues to produce) Jeju water for in-aircraft. As the sale of bottled water to the Koreans became possible in the 1990s, Jeju Province entered the mineral water market, motivated from the success of Korean Air. A development corporation was made and started to produce Jeju-water, and in 1998 Jeju Samdasoo was released.

All of the Jeju-branded mineral water has been made by Jeju province development co. (except for Hanjin Jeju Pure Water) since today.

== Product information ==
=== Products ===
- 0.5L : 500₩ (33.744₵)
- 2L : 1000₩ (80.808₵)
- 1.5L(only sold for flight sales)

=== Mineral content ===
Samdasoo is classed as soft water because its mineral content is generally low.

- Ca 2.5~4.0
- K 1.5~3.4
- Na 4.0~7.2
- Mg 1.7~3.5
- F non-detected

== Market share ==
Since Samdasoo was launched in March 1998, it has been ranked number one in Korea's bottled water market in six months. In 2009, the market share of drinking water PET bottles was 50.7%, and by 2017 it was the market leader for 19 consecutive years. It ranked first in market share for 20 consecutive years until 2018

Until now, Samdasoo has been 1st place in market share after it was released, but these days new brands of mineral water are appearing (especially Nongshim), so market share of Samdasoo is decreasing.

== Manufacturing process ==
Water is raised from the volcanic bedrock which is located 420m underground, and Samdasoo is produced after a manufacturing process of "filtering - UV disinfection - injection - product inspection - packing - shipment".

== Selling right dispute ==
Since the release of Jeju Samdasoo, Nongshim and Jeju province development co. has made a trading base agreement of Samdasoo, and Jeju province development co. fulfilled the production while Nongshim took charge of sales activities. But Jeju province revised the ordinance in December, 2011, and gave Nongsim a notice that the contract was canceled. Nongshim filed a suit against Jeju province development co., and Jeju province practically lost a case by the Supreme Court decision in June, 2016. But the selling right of Nongshim was already stopped, and the new seller Kwangdong Pharmaceutical has had the right since 2012.

== Service ==
Jeju Samdasoo is said to offer discounts to customers who use delivery services through its application from May 12, 2021. "Jeju Samdasoo Club" not only offers benefits of more than annual fees, but also offers a variety of goods products as gifts.
