= An Tae-hyun =

South Korean footballer

Personal information
- Full name: An Tae-hyun
- Date of birth: 1 March 1993 (age 33)
- Place of birth: South Korea
- Height: 1.74 m (5 ft 8 1/2 in)
- Position: Midfielder

Team information
- Current team: Bucheon FC
- Number: 26

Youth career
- 2013–2015: Hongik University

Senior career*
Years	Team	Apps	(Gls)
2016	Seoul E-Land	31	(3)
2017–2021	Bucheon FC	124	(6)
2020–2021	→ Sangju / Gimcheon Sangmu (army)	22	(1)
2022–2025	Jeju SK	86	(5)
2026–	Bucheon FC	19	(1)
- * Club domestic league appearances and goals as of 5 January 2026

An Tae-hyun (Korean: 안태현; born 1 March 1993) is a South Korean footballer who plays as midfielder for Bucheon FC in the K League 1.

== Career ==
An Tae-hyun signed with Seoul E-Land before the 2016 season. He made 31 appearances and scored 3 goals in his debut season.

An moved to Bucheon FC 1995 on 3 January 2017.
