= Kim Tae-han =

South Korean footballer

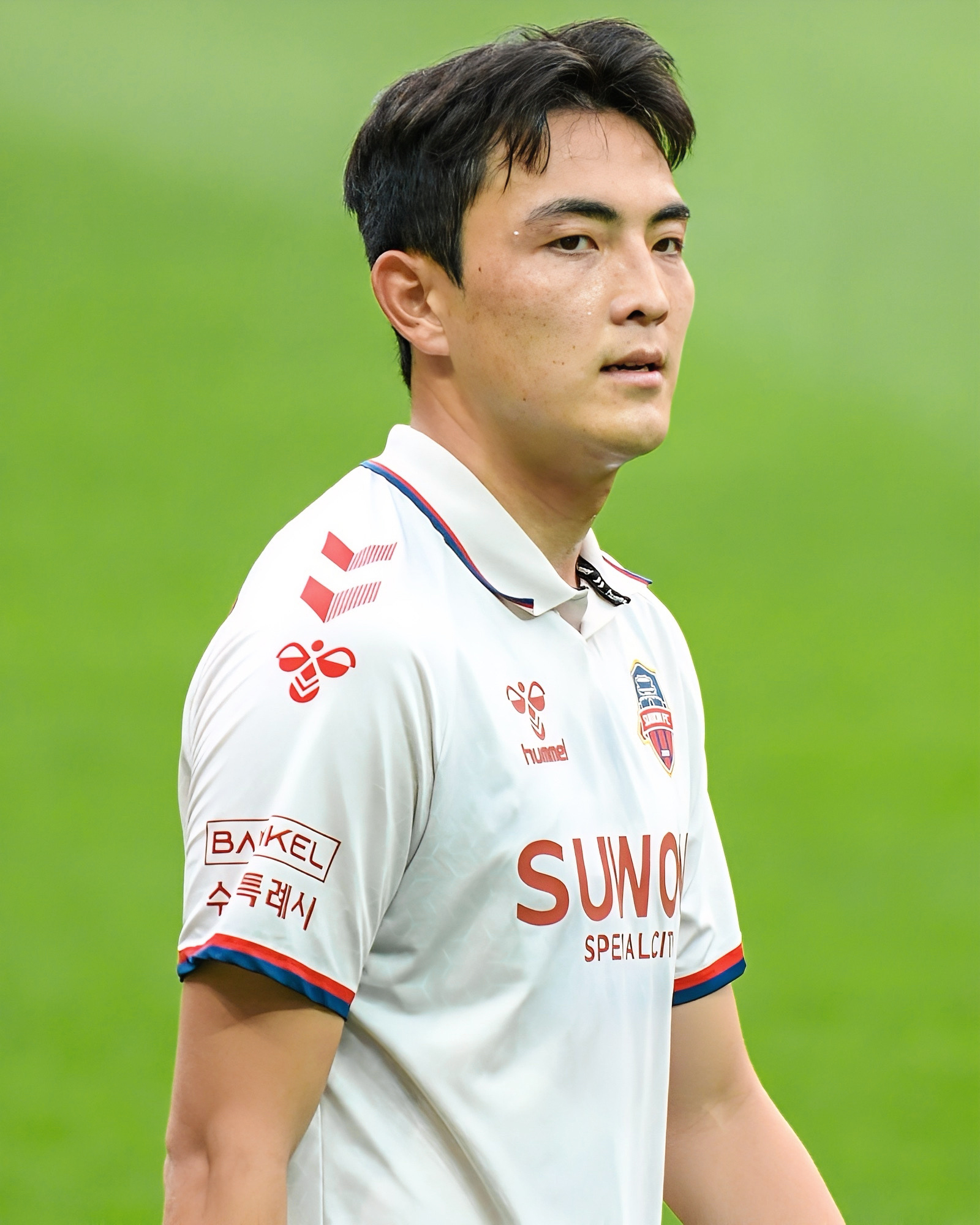
- Kim in 2025

Personal information
- Date of birth: 24 February 1996 (age 30)
- Place of birth: Daegu, South Korea
- Height: 1.83 m (6 ft 0 in)
- Position: Defender

Team information
- Current team: Gimpo FC
- Number: 4

Senior career*
Years	Team	Apps	(Gls)
2018–2020	Daegu FC	6	(0)
2021–2024	Gimpo FC	97	(2)
2024–2025	Suwon FC	59	(2)
2026–	Gimpo FC	17	(0)
- * Club domestic league appearances and goals as of 6 August 2026

- Kim Tae-han
- Hangul: 김태한
- Hanja: 金泰韓
- RR: Gim Taehan
- MR: Kim T'aehan

Kim Tae-han (Korean: 김태한; born 24 February 1996) is a South Korean football defender, who plays for Gimpo FC in the K League 2, the second tier of football in South Korea. He previously played in the K League 1 for Daegu FC.

== Club career ==
Born on 24 February 1996, Kim played his youth football for Hanyang University. He joined Daegu FC in January 2018 and made his debut for the club on 13 May 2018, playing against Suwon Bluewings in the K League 1. Unused in the 2020 season, the following year he transferred to Gimpo FC, which played in the K3 League.

== Club career statistics ==
As of 13 December 2021

Club performance			League		Cup		Continental		Total	
Season	Club	League	Apps	Goals	Apps	Goals	Apps	Goals	Apps	Goals
South Korea			League		KFA Cup		Asia		Total	
2018	Daegu FC	K League 1	3	0	0	0	-		3	0
2019	Daegu FC	K League 1	3	0	0	0	0	0	3	0
2020	Daegu FC	K League 1	0	0	0	0	-		0	0
2021	Gimpo FC	K3 League	29	0	0	0	-		29	0
2022	Gimpo FC	K League 2	32	1	1	0	-		33	1
Career total			67	1	1	0	0	0	68	1

== Honors and awards ==
=== Player ===
Daegu FC

- Korean FA Cup Winners (1) : 2018

Gimpo FC

- League Winners (1) : 2021 K3 League
