= Jeong Chi-in =

South Korean footballer

- Jeong in 2026

Personal information
- Date of birth: 21 August 1997 (age 29)
- Place of birth: South Korea
- Height: 1.82 m (6 ft 0 in)
- Position: Forward

Team information
- Current team: Incheon United FC
- Number: 23

Senior career*
Years	Team	Apps	(Gls)
2016–2025	Daegu FC	97	(8)
2023-2024	→ Gimcheon Sangmu (army)	42	(7)
2026–	Incheon United FC	15	(0)
- * Club domestic league appearances and goals as of 3 August 2026

- Jeong Chi-in
- Hangul: 정치인
- RR: Jeong Chiin
- MR: Chŏng Ch'iin

Jeong Chi-in (Korean: 정치인; born 21 August 1997) is a South Korean football forward, who plays for Incheon United FC in the K League 1.

== Club career ==
Born on 21 August 1997, Jeong made his debut as a substitute for Daegu FC on 5 May 2018, playing against Gyeongnam FC in the K League 1.

== Club career statistics ==
As of 1 January 2026

Club performance			League		Cup		Continental		Total	
Season	Club	League	Apps	Goals	Apps	Goals	Apps	Goals	Apps	Goals
South Korea			League		KFA Cup		Asia		Total	
2016	Daegu FC	K League 2	0	0	0	0	-		0	0
2017	Daegu FC	K League 1	0	0	0	0	-		0	0
2018	Daegu FC	K League 1	6	0	0	0	-		6	0
2019	Daegu FC	K League 1	6	0	0	0	0	0	6	0
2020	Daegu FC	K League 1	2	0	0	0	-		2	0
2021	Daegu FC	K League 1	23	2	1	0	5	3	29	5
2022	Daegu FC	K League 1	16	0	0	0	5	1	21	1
2023	Gimcheon Sangmu FC	K League 1	27	5	0	0	-		27	5
2024	Gimcheon Sangmu FC	K League 2	15	2	0	0	-		15	2
2024	Daegu FC	K League 1	16	3	0	0	-		16	3
2025	Daegu FC	K League 1	31	3	1	0	-		32	3
Career total			142	15	2	0	10	4	154	19
