= Kim Hyeon-ug =

South Korean footballer

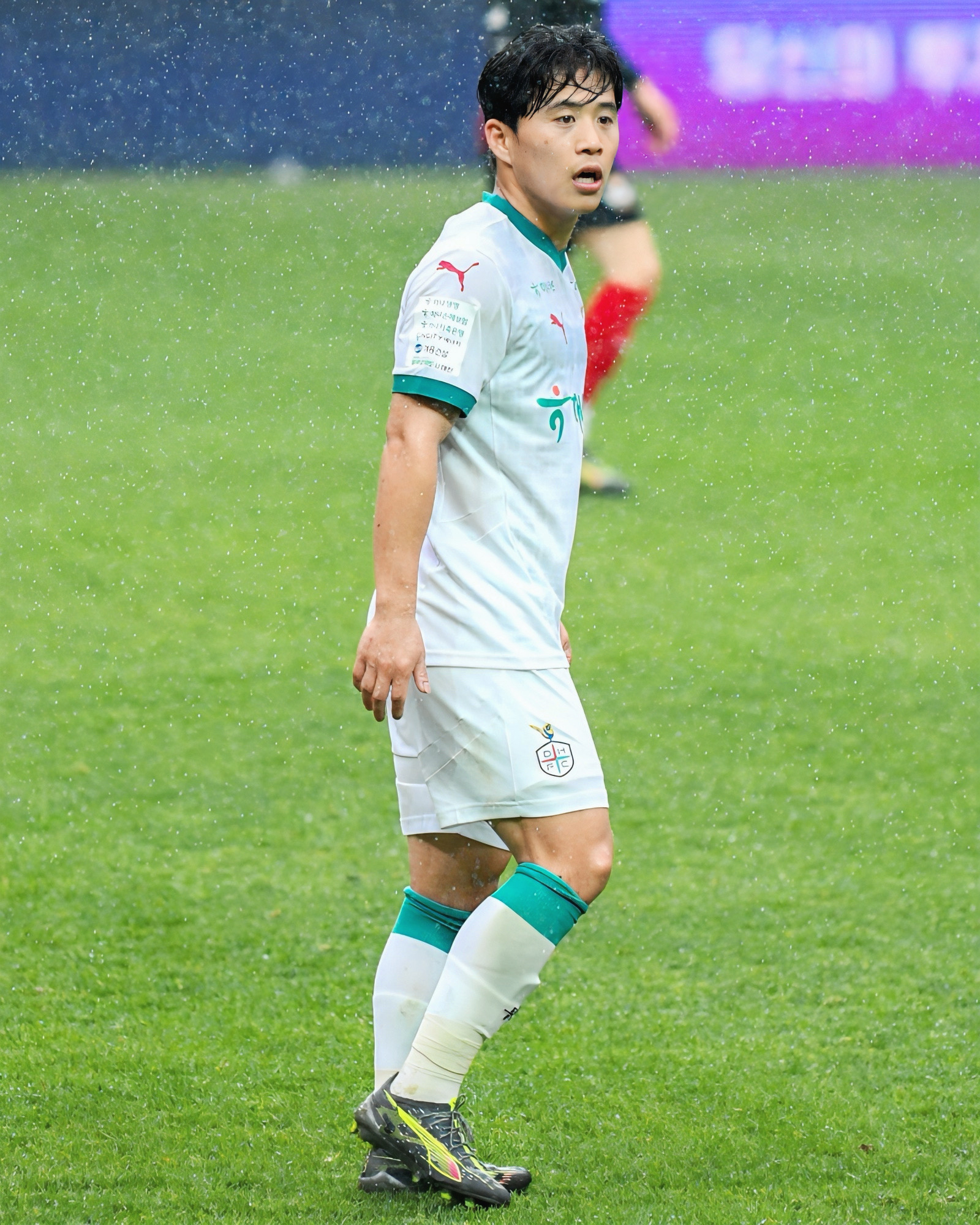
- Kim in 2025

Personal information
- Date of birth: 22 June 1995 (age 31)
- Place of birth: South Korea
- Height: 1.60 m (5 ft 3 in)
- Position: Midfielder

Team information
- Current team: Daejeon Hana Citizen
- Number: 70

Youth career
- 2014–2016: Hanyang University

Senior career*
Years	Team	Apps	(Gls)
2017–2018	Jeju United	25	(4)
2019	Gangwon FC	31	(2)
2020–2024	Jeonnam Dragons FC	84	(8)
2023–2024	Gimcheon Sangmu (Army)	42	(6)
2024–	Daejeon Hana Citizen	49	(3)
- * Club domestic league appearances and goals as of 3 August 2026

Kim Hyeon-ug (Korean: 김현욱; born 22 June 1995) is a South Korean footballer who plays as midfielder for Daejeon Hana Citizen in K League 1.

== Career ==
Kim joined K League 1 side Jeju United before 2017 season starts.

== Career statistics ==
=== Club ===
As of 10 September 2024

Appearances and goals by club, season and competition
Club	Season	League			National Cup		Continental		Total	
Club	Season	Division	Apps	Goals	Apps	Goals	Apps	Goals	Apps	Goals
Jeju United	2017	K League 1	3	0	—		0	0	3	0
Jeju United	2018	K League 1	22	4	0	0	1 (Note: Appearance(s) in AFC Champions League)	0	23	4
Jeju United	Total		25	4	0	0	1	0	26	4
Gangwon	2019	K League 1	31	2	2	0	—		33	2
Jeonnam Dragons	2020	K League 2	20	3	—		—		20	3
Jeonnam Dragons	2021	K League 2	35	3	4	0	—		39	3
Jeonnam Dragons	2022	K League 2	29	2	0	0	0	0	29	2
Jeonnam Dragons	Total		84	8	4	0	0	0	88	8
Gimcheon Sangmu (Army)	2023	K League 2	28	1	—		—		28	1
Gimcheon Sangmu (Army)	2024	K League 1	14	5	0	0	—		14	5
Gimcheon Sangmu (Army)	Total		42	6	0	0	—		42	6
Daejeon Hana Citizen	2024	K League 1	5	0	—		—		5	0
Career Total			187	20	6	0	1	0	194	20
