= Kim Jun-beom =

South Korean footballer (born 1998)

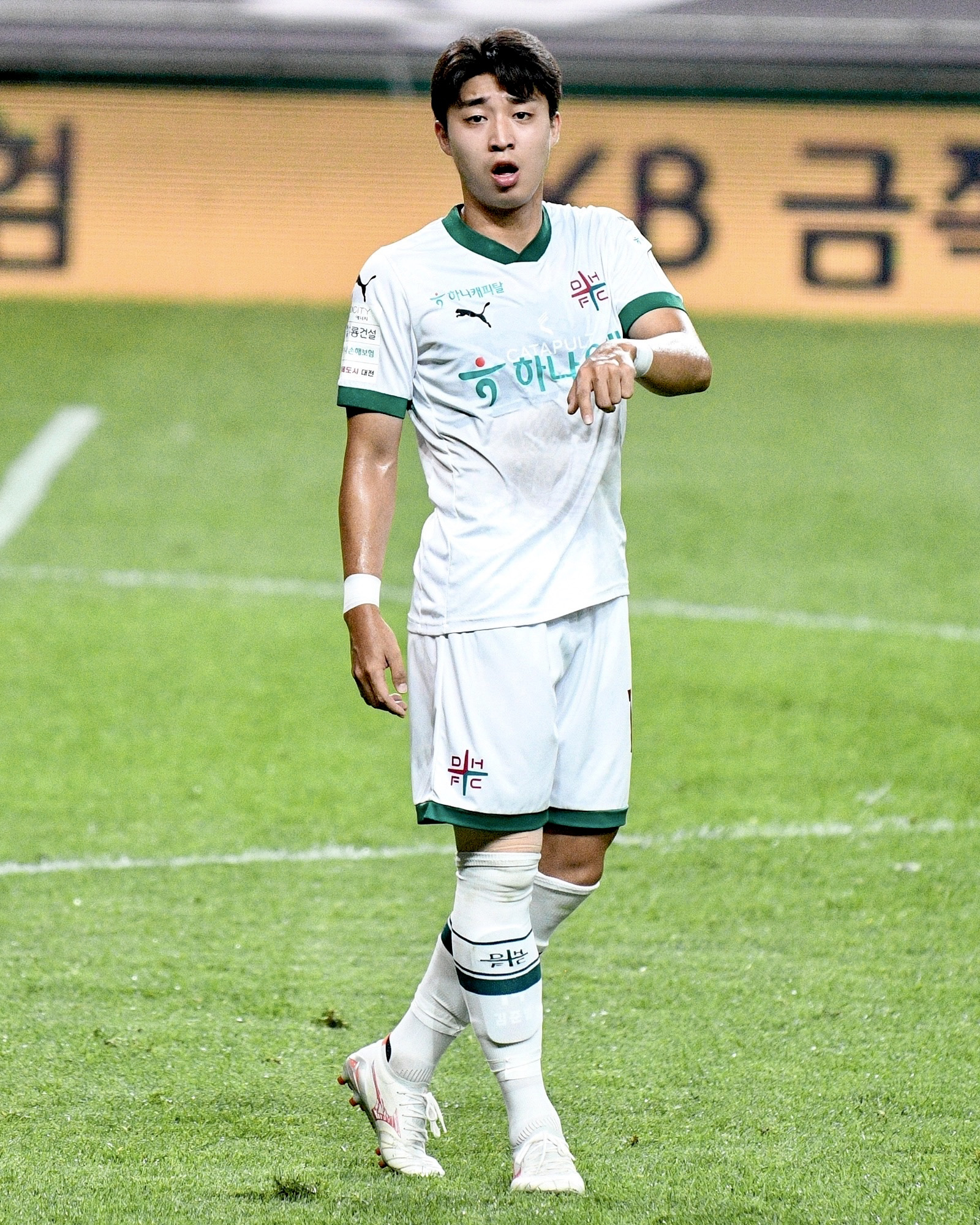
- Kim in 2024

Personal information
- Date of birth: 14 January 1998 (age 28)
- Place of birth: Mokpo, Jeollanam-do, South Korea
- Height: 1.76 m (5 ft 9 1/2 in)
- Position: Central midfielder

Team information
- Current team: Daejeon Hana Citizen
- Number: 14

Youth career
- 2013–2015: Bupyeong High School
- 2016–2017: Yonsei University

Senior career*
Years	Team	Apps	(Gls)
2018–2019	Gyeongnam FC	50	(2)
2020–2024	Incheon United	40	(2)
2022–2023	→ Gimcheon Sangmu (army)	27	(3)
2024–	Daejeon Hana Citizen	45	(8)

International career
2019	South Korea U23	2	(0)
- * Club domestic league appearances and goals as of 3 August 2026

Kim Jun-beom (Korean: 김준범; born 14 January 1998) is a South Korean footballer who plays as a midfielder for Daejeon Hana Citizen.

== Career ==
Before the start of the 2018 K League 1 season, Kim joined Gyeongnam FC together with his brother Kim Joon-seon.
