= Oberdan (footballer) =

Brazilian footballer (born 1995)

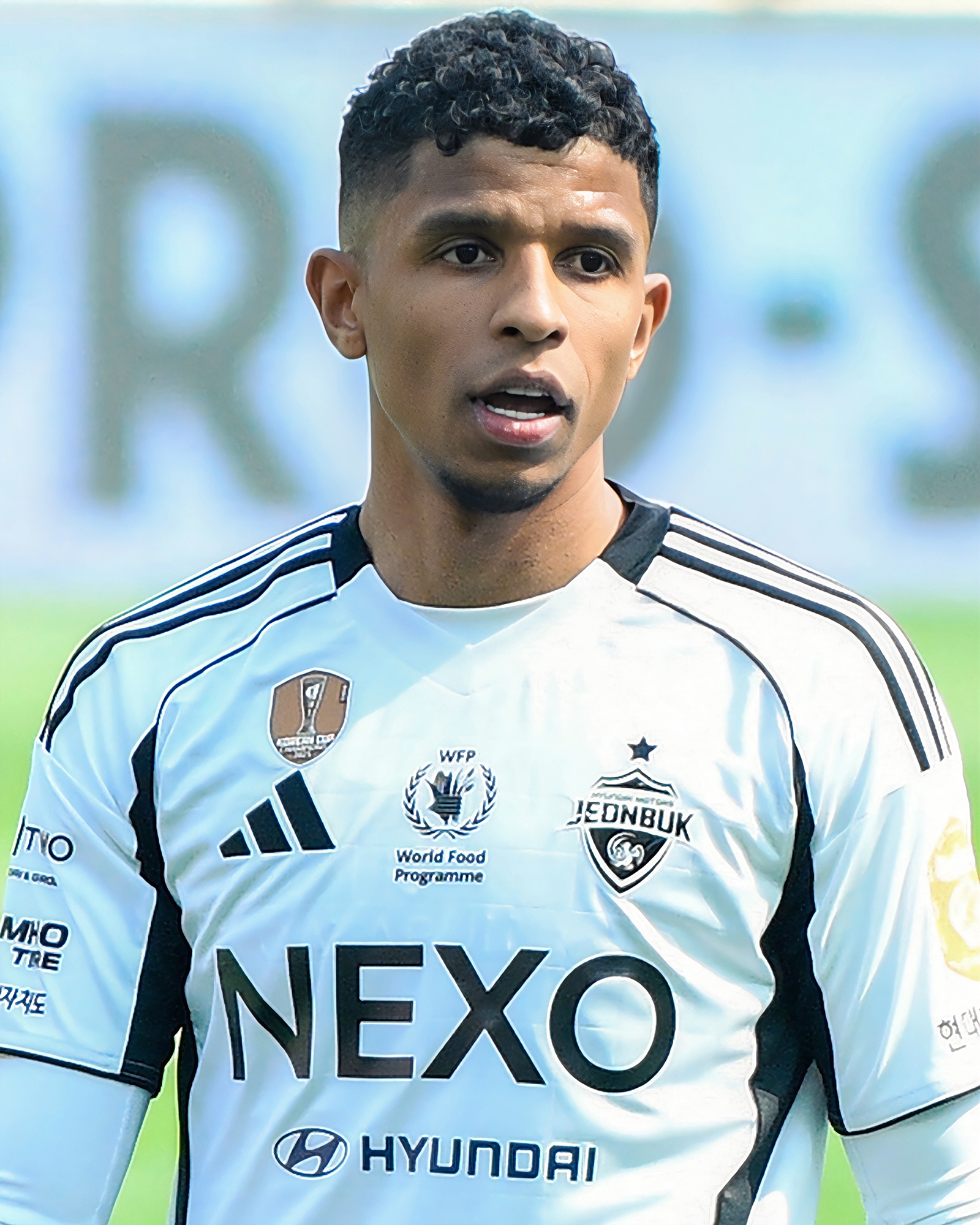
- Oberdan in 2025

Personal information
- Full name: Oberdan Alionço de Lima
- Date of birth: 30 July 1995 (age 31)
- Place of birth: Pinhais, Brazil
- Height: 1.75 m (5 ft 9 in)
- Position: Midfielder

Team information
- Current team: Fagiano Okayama
- Number: 80

Senior career*
Years	Team	Apps	(Gls)
2015–2017	Rio Branco PR	30	(1)
2017–2021	FC Cascavel		
2018	→ Fluminense FC (loan)		
2019	→ Bara FC (loan)		
2019	→ Atlético Itajaí (loan)		
2021	→ Figueirense FC (loan)	17	
2022–2023	Figueirense FC	35	(4)
2023	→ Pohang Steelers (loan)	33	(1)
2024–2025	Pohang Steelers	66	(9)
2026	Jeonbuk Hyundai Motors	22	(1)
2026–	Fagiano Okayama	7	(0)
- * Club domestic league appearances and goals as of 3 August 2026 (KST)

Oberdan Alionço de Lima (born 30 July 1995), known as Oberdan, is a Brazilian professional footballer who plays as a midfielder for J1 League club Fagiano Okayama.

== Career ==
Oberdan has played for Rio Branco PR, FC Cascavel, and Figueirense FC, as well as spending spells on loan at a number of other clubs in Brazil. In 2023 he joined South Korean top-flight team Pohang Steelers on a one-year loan with an option to buy. In his first year in the K League, he was named as one of the league's 'Best XI' across the season. Pohang triggered the buy clause ahead of the 2024 season, signing Oberdan on a three year contract.

In August 2026, he joined J1 League club Fagiano Okayama.

== Honours ==
=== Club ===
==== Pohang Steelers ====
- Korea Cup: 2023, 2024

=== Individual ===
- K League 1 'Best XI': 2023, 2024
- K League All-Star squad: 2024
