= 2026 K League 1 =

Football season in South Korea

Hana Bank K League 1
- Season: 2026
- Dates: 28 February – 17 May; 4 July – 6 December 2026
- Country: South Korea
- Teams: 12
- Champions: FC Seoul (7th title)
- Relegated: Gimcheon Sangmu
- 2027–28 AFC Champions League Elite: FC Seoul
- Matches: 216
- Goals: 541 (2.5 per match)
- Top goalscorer: (Brazil) Yago Cariello (Ulsan HD) (17 goals)
- Biggest home win: FC Seoul 5-0 Gwangju (22 March)
- Biggest away win: Anyang 0-7 FC Seoul (22 August)
- Longest winning run: 6 Seoul
- Longest unbeaten run: 7 Seoul
- Longest winless run: 28; Gwangju
- Longest losing run: 8 Gwangju
- Highest attendance: 35,729; FC Seoul 0-0 FC Anyang (5 May)
- Lowest attendance: 940; Gimcheon Sangmu 0-1 Jeju SK (22 November)
- Total attendance: 1,832,859
- Average attendance: 8,485
- All statistics correct as of 22 November 2026.

The 2026 K League 1, also known as the Hana Bank K League 1 for sponsorship reasons, is the ongoing 44th season of the top division of professional football in South Korea, and the thirteenth season of the K League 1. Jeonbuk Hyundai Motors is the defending champion. Gangwon FC will play all their own home matches at Gangneung Stadium, Gangneung only.

== Rule changes ==
The following rules were newly introduced for the 2026 season.

1. Abolish the quota on the number of foreign players a club may register but maximum of five foreign players will be permitted on the pitch or in the matchday squad.
2. Foreign goalkeepers can be registered as ban lifted after 26 years.
3. Clubs will now have five substitutions and the U22 mandatory appearance rule is lifted. However, the 20-man matchday squad still requires a minimum of two U22 players. Missing this threshold results in a reduced squad size (19 players for one U22, 18 for none).
4. The affiliation agreement between the K League, the Korea Armed Forces Athletic Corps (Sangmu), and Gimcheon City expires at the end of 2026. As a result, if either Gimcheon establishes a new citizen-owned club or the Armed Forces Athletic Corps moves and forms a new K League club in a different city, both new clubs will enter the K League 2 competition starting in 2027.
5. Starting with the 2027 season, K League 1 will feature 14 clubs. As a result, 2026 K League 2's top two teams and the winner of the final of promotion play-offs of K League 2 will be automatically promoted to 2027 K League 1. The losing finalists of promotion play-offs of K League 2 may also be promoted if they win the K League 1 relegation play-offs, which can only be held if Gimcheon Sangmu doesn't finish the season last at the table.

== Teams ==
=== Team changes ===
Bucheon FC 1995 were promoted from the K League 2 for the first time in the club's history, while Incheon United was promoted immediately after relegation in 2024.

Bucheon return to top tier since 1996 as Bucheon Yukong and 1997 as Bucheon SK before Yukong Elephants until 1995, when relocate to Jeju and change name to Jeju United from 2006 until 2024, change again to Jeju SK from 2025 onwards.

Suwon FC and Daegu FC were relegated to the K League 2 after five and ten years in top tier.

▲ Promoted from K League 2	▼ Relegated to K League 2
Incheon United; Bucheon FC 1995	Suwon FC; Daegu FC

=== Locations ===
The following twelve clubs are competing in the 2025 K League 1.

Team	City/Province	Abbreviation
FC Anyang	Anyang	Anyang
Bucheon FC 1995	Bucheon	Bucheon
Daejeon Hana Citizen	Daejeon	Daejeon
Gangwon FC	Gangwon	Gangwon
Gimcheon Sangmu	Gimcheon	Gimcheon
Gwangju FC	Gwangju	Gwangju
Incheon United	Incheon	Incheon
Jeju SK	Jeju	Jeju
Jeonbuk Hyundai Motors	Jeonbuk	Jeonbuk
Pohang Steelers	Pohang	Pohang
FC Seoul	Seoul	Seoul
Ulsan HD	Ulsan	Ulsan

Locations of the 2026 K League 1 teams	Locations of the 2026 K League 1 teams in the Seoul Capital Area

=== Stadiums ===
FC Anyang	Bucheon FC 1995	Daejeon Hana Citizen	Gangwon FC
Anyang Stadium	Bucheon Stadium	Daejeon World Cup Stadium	Gangneung HIGH1 ARENA
Capacity: 17,143	Capacity: 34,456	Capacity: 40,903	Capacity: 22,333
Gimcheon Sangmu	Gwangju FC	Incheon United	Jeonbuk Hyundai Motors
Gimcheon Stadium	Gwangju World Cup Stadium	Incheon Football Stadium	Jeonju World Cup Stadium
Capacity: 25,000	Capacity: 40,245	Capacity: 20,891	Capacity: 42,477
Jeju SK	Pohang Steelers	FC Seoul	Ulsan HD
Jeju World Cup Stadium	Pohang Steel Yard	Seoul World Cup Stadium	Ulsan Munsu Football Stadium
Capacity: 29,791	Capacity: 17,443	Capacity: 66,704	Capacity: 44,102

=== Personnel and sponsoring ===
Team	Manager	Kit manufacturer	Main sponsor	Other sponsor(s)
FC Anyang	(South Korea) Ryu Byeong-hoon	V-EXX	Harrington Place (Apartment brand)	List: Front: None; Back: None; Sleeves: None; Shorts: None
Bucheon FC 1995	(South Korea) Lee Young-min	Kelme	Bucheon Jaseng Hospital of Korean Medicine	List: Front: Bastem; Back: Wawabuza; Sleeves: Bucheon City; Shorts: None
Daejeon Hana Citizen	(South Korea) Hwang Sun-hong	Goal Studio	Hana Bank	List: Front: Hana Capital; Back: Hana Securities, Hana Card, Hana Life; Sleeves: Hana Savings Bank, CNCITY Energy, Gyeryong Construction, Hana Insurance, Daejeon First-Class Economic City; Shorts: None
Gangwon FC	(South Korea) Chung Kyung-ho	Applerind	High1 Resort	List: Front: None; Back: Gangwon Hanwoo; Sleeves: Kangwon Land, Gangwon State; Shorts: None
Gimcheon Sangmu	(South Korea) Ju Seung-jin	Kelme	Happy Gimcheon	List: Front: Nonghyup Bank; Back: Neo Tech, DGB Financial Group, North Gyeongsang Province; Sleeves: Aju Steel, Shine Muscat, Gimcheon; Shorts: None
Gwangju FC	(South Korea) Lee Jung-kyu	Goal Studio	Kwangju Bank	List: Front: None; Back: None; Sleeves: Parangsae Eye Clinic, Gwangju City; Shorts: Namhai Honnête
Incheon United	(South Korea) Yoon Jong-hwan	Macron	IFEZ	List: Front: All Ways Incheon, Ddangyo, Shinhan Bank; Back: None; Sleeves: 2025 APEC Incheon, Incheon; Shorts: None
Jeju SK	(Portugal) Sérgio Costa	V-EXX	SK Energy	List: Front: Jeju, SK Muffin; Back: Jeju Samdasoo; Sleeves: EnClean Solux Plus+, Only Jeju; Shorts: None
Jeonbuk Hyundai Motors	(South Korea) Chung Jung-yong	Adidas	NEXO	List: Front: Hyundai Motors; Back: Hyundai N, Hyundai Motors/Kumho Tire; Sleeves: Jeonbuk State, Hyundai Ioniq 5 N/Hyundai Avante N; Shorts: None
Pohang Steelers	(South Korea) Kim Seong-jae (Interim)	Puma	POSCO	List: Front: Pohang, POSCO (away); Back: Lashevan, POSCO E&C; Sleeves: Pohang; Shorts: None
FC Seoul	(South Korea) Kim Gi-dong	Pro-Specs	Xi (home); GS Caltex (away)	List: Front: TMON; Back: Shinhan SOL Pay, GS Caltex; Sleeves: KEF, Seoul My Soul, GS25; Shorts: None
Ulsan HD	(South Korea) Kim Hyun-seok	Adidas	HD Hyundai	List: Front: Ulsan, the city of dreams, Ulsan, the corporate city; Back: HD Hyundai Oilbank Kazen; Sleeves: BNK Kyongnam Bank, Develon, Ulsan; Shorts: None

=== Managerial changes ===
Team	Outgoing manager	Manner of departure	Date of vacancy	Table	Replaced by	Date of appointment
Jeju SK	(South Korea) Kim Jung-soo (Interim)	End of Interim	1 December 2025	Pre-season	(Portugal) Sérgio Costa	24 December 2025
Ulsan HD	(South Korea) Roh Sang-rae (Interim)	End of Interim	1 December 2025	Pre-season	(South Korea) Kim Hyun-seok	24 December 2025
Jeonbuk Hyundai Motors	(Uruguay) Gus Poyet	Resigned	8 December 2025	Pre-season	(South Korea) Chung Jung-yong	24 December 2025
Gwangju FC	(South Korea) Lee Jung-hyo	Mutual agreement	21 December 2025	Pre-season	(South Korea) Lee Jung-kyu	24 December 2025
Gimcheon Sangmu	(South Korea) Chung Jung-yong	Mutual agreement	24 December 2025	Pre-season	(South Korea) Ju Seung-jin	31 December 2025
Pohang Steelers	(South Korea) Park Tae-ha	Resigned	30 October 2026	9th	(South Korea) Kim Seong-jae (Interim)	31 October 2026
Ulsan HD	(South Korea) Kim Hyun-seok	Mutual Agreement	6 December 2026	2nd		

== Foreign players ==
Each team may register an unlimited number of foreigners, but may only field up to five at any given time. As a military-owned team, Gimcheon Sangmu are not allowed to sign any foreign players.

A North Korean player is considered to be a domestic player under South Korean nationality law. As of 2025, K League has a homegrown system under which players of foreign nationality who have grown up in Korea are considered to be domestic players when registering as n

Players in bold were registered during the mid-season transfer window. Players in italics left their respective clubs during the mid-season transfer window.

Team	Player 1	Player 2	Player 3	Player 4	Player 5	Player 6	Player 7	Player 8	Homegrown player (s)	Former player (s) (Note: Left their respective clubs during the mid-season transfer window.)
FC Anyang	(Bosnia and Herzegovina) Ivan Jukić	(Brazil) Airton	(Brazil) Breno Herculano	(Brazil) Matheus Oliveira	(Cameroon) **Blaise Tsague**	(Netherlands) **Danny Bakker**	(Serbia) **Branislav Knežević**			(Netherlands) Thomas Oude Kotte (Rwanda) York Rafael
Bucheon FC 1995	(Brazil) **Gustavo Nescau**	(Brazil) Jefferson Galego	(Brazil) Patrick William	(Brazil) Rodrigo Bassani	(Brazil) Thiaguinho Santos	(Brazil) Vitor Gabriel	(Japan) Kazuki Takahashi			(Colombia) Jhon Montaño
Daejeon Hana Citizen	(Azerbaijan) Anton Kryvotsyuk	(Brazil) Diogo	(Brazil) João Victor	(Brazil) Victor Bobsin	(Japan) Masatoshi Ishida	(Sweden) Gustav Ludwigson				
Gangwon FC	(Israel) Abdallah Hleihel	(Montenegro) Marko Tući	(Nigeria) **Jesse Sekidika**	(Sweden) **Abdelkarim Mammar**						
Gwangju FC	(Australia) **John Iredale**	(Brazil) **João Pedro**	(Iceland) Hólmbert Friðjónsson	(Ivory Coast) **Adriel Ba Loua**	(Netherlands) **Teun van Grunsven**	(Slovenia) **Emir Saitoski**				
Incheon United	(Brazil) **Leandro Ribeiro**	(Guinea-Bissau) Gerso Fernandes	(Guyana) Morgan Ferrier	(Montenegro) Stefan Mugoša	(Spain) Iker Undabarrena	(Spain) Juan Ibiza				
Jeju SK	(Albania) **Eraldo Çinari**	(Brazil) Emerson Negueba	(Brazil) Italo	(Brazil) **Matheus Aiás**	(France) Julien Célestine	(Portugal) Tobias Figueiredo				(Lithuania) Gytis Paulauskas
Jeonbuk Hyundai Motors	(Brazil) Bruno Mota	(Brazil) **Dodô**	(Brazil) **Italo**	(Brazil) Tiago Orobó	(Ghana) Patrick Twumasi	(Italy) Andrea Compagno	(Lithuania) **Gytis Paulauskas**	(Portugal) João Gamboa		(Brazil) Oberdan
Pohang Steelers	(Brazil) Jorge Teixeira	(Brazil) Juninho Rocha	(Brazil) Wanderson	(Germany) Jakob Tranziska	(Japan) Kento Nishiya					
FC Seoul	(Brazil) Anderson	(Colombia) Leonardo Acevedo	(Croatia) Hrvoje Babec	(Jordan) Yazan Al-Arab	(Poland) Patryk Klimala	(Spain) Juan Antonio Ros			(Ivory Coast) Gbato Seloh Samuel	(Serbia) Aleksandar Paločević
Ulsan HD	(Brazil) Erick Farias	(Brazil) Marcão	(Brazil) Pedrinho	(Brazil) Yago Cariello	(Netherlands) **Thomas Oude Kotte**	(Poland) Miłosz Trojak	(Sweden) Darijan Bojanić	(United States) Benji Michel		

== League table ==
Pos	Team	Pld	W	D	L	GF	GA	GD	Pts	Qualification or relegation (Note: Teams played each other three times (33 matches), before the league was split into two groups, the top six and the bottom six.)
1	FC Seoul (C, Q)	36	21	7	8	63	32	+31	70	Qualification for Champions League Elite league stage
2	Ulsan HD (T)	36	17	6	13	57	51	+6	57	Qualification for Champions League Elite league stage
3	Daejeon Hana Citizen (T)	36	15	11	10	58	42	+16	56	Qualification for Champions League Elite league stage
4	Incheon United	36	14	10	12	46	38	+8	52	Qualification for Champions League Elite play-off round
5	Gangwon FC	36	12	15	9	45	37	+8	51	
6	Jeonbuk Hyundai Motors	36	12	13	11	45	37	+8	49	
7	Jeju SK	36	13	12	11	42	39	+3	51	
8	FC Anyang	36	11	14	11	43	51	−8	47	
9	Pohang Steelers	36	11	12	13	34	43	−9	45	
10	Gimcheon Sangmu (Note: Military-owned team Gimcheon Sangmu cannot qualify for AFC competitions. Gimcheon Sangmu will be relegated to K League 2 2027 season regardless of their own final place.) (R)	36	6	20	10	35	43	−8	38	Relegation to K League 2
11	Bucheon FC 1995	36	7	12	17	37	55	−18	33	
12	Gwangju FC (Q)	36	4	14	18	36	73	−37	26	Qualification for relegation play-offs

Updated to match(es) played on 22 November 2026. Source: Soccerway K League
Rules for classification: 1) Points; 2) Goals scored; 3) Goal difference; 4) Wins; 5) Head-to-head points
(C) Champions; (Q) Qualified for the phase indicated; (R) Relegated; (T) Qualified, but not yet for the particular phase indicated

== Positions by matchday ==
Leaders, qualification for Champions League Elite league stage
Qualification for Champions League Elite league stage
Qualification for relegation play-offs
Relegation to K League 2

=== Round 1–33 ===
Team ╲ Round	1	2	3	4	5	6	7	8	9	10	11	12	13	14	15	16	17	18	19	20	21	22	23	24	25	26	27	28	29	30	31	32	33
FC Seoul	3	1	2	2	1	1	1	1	1	1	1	1	1	1	1	1	1	1	1	1	1	1	1	1	1	1	1	1	1	1	1	1	1
Ulsan HD	1	2	1	1	2	3	2	2	2	2	3	3	2	2	2	2	5	4	4	4	2	2	2	2	3	2	3	2	2	2	2	2	2
Daejeon Hana Citizen	4	6	6	3	4	6	11	7	10	7	5	5	8	9	10	10	10	9	9	9	9	9	10	10	9	9	6	6	6	6	6	5	3
Jeonbuk Hyundai Motors	10	8	8	5	3	2	3	3	4	3	2	2	3	3	3	4	2	3	3	2	3	3	4	3	2	3	2	3	3	4	5	3	4
Gangwon FC	12	11	11	10	10	6	4	4	3	6	4	4	6	5	4	3	3	2	2	3	4	4	3	4	4	5	4	5	5	5	3	4	5
Incheon United	11	11	10	11	9	5	8	10	7	5	8	8	5	6	6	6	7	7	7	6	6	7	8	6	8	8	9	7	7	8	7	7	6
Jeju SK	8	10	11	12	12	12	7	7	5	8	11	9	7	7	8	8	8	8	8	8	7	5	5	5	5	4	5	4	4	3	4	6	7
FC Anyang	4	2	3	5	7	8	9	5	8	4	7	7	9	8	7	7	6	6	6	5	5	6	7	8	7	7	8	9	9	9	8	8	8
Pohang Steelers	4	7	9	9	11	4	6	9	6	9	6	6	4	4	5	5	4	5	5	7	8	8	6	7	6	6	7	8	8	7	9	9	9
Gimcheon Sangmu	4	6	6	8	8	11	10	11	11	10	9	10	10	10	11	11	11	11	11	10	10	10	11	11	11	11	11	11	11	10	10	10	10
Bucheon FC 1995	2	1	5	5	5	9	5	5	9	11	10	11	11	11	9	9	9	10	10	11	11	11	9	9	10	10	10	10	10	11	11	11	11
Gwangju FC	8	2	4	4	6	10	12	12	12	12	12	12	12	12	12	12	12	12	12	12	12	12	12	12	12	12	12	12	12	12	12	12	12

Updated to match(es) played on 24 October 2026. Source: K League
Notes:
- Matchday 2 (7–8 March): The match between Pohang Steelers and Gangwon FC was postponed to 28 March due to Gangwon FC's schedule for the 2025–26 AFC Champions League Elite.
- Matchday 2 (7–8 March): The match between Ulsan HD and FC Seoul was postponed to 15 April due to FC Seoul's schedule for the 2025–26 AFC Champions League Elite.
- Matchday 22 (8 August): The match between Gangwon FC and Incheon United was postponed to 27 September due to Gangwon FC's schedule for the 2026–27 AFC Champions League Elite.

=== Round 34–38 ===
Team ╲ Round	34	35	36	37	38
FC Seoul	1	1	1	1	1
Ulsan HD	2	2	2		
Daejeon Hana Citizen	3	3	3		
Incheon United	4	6	4		
Gangwon FC	6	4	5		
Jeonbuk Hyundai Motors	5	5	6		
Jeju SK	7	7	7	7	
FC Anyang	8	8	8		
Pohang Steelers	9	9	9		
Gimcheon Sangmu	10	10	10	10	R
Bucheon FC 1995	11	11	11	11	
Gwangju FC	12	12	12	12	12

Updated to match(es) played on 22 November 2026. Source: K League

== Results ==
=== Matches 1–22 ===
Teams will play each other twice, once at home, once away.

Home \ Away	AYG	BCN	DHC	GWN	GCS	GJU	ICU	JSK	JHM	PHS	SEO	USH
FC Anyang	—	0–1	1–2	2–1	2–2	1–1	0–1	2–1	1–1	2–3	1–1	1–1
Bucheon FC 1995	2–3	—	1–1	0–0	0–2	0–0	2–2	0–1	0–0	2–0	1–3	1–2
Daejeon Hana Citizen	1–1	2–2	—	0–2	1–1	2–0	0–0	0–1	0–1	0–2	1–2	2–2
Gangwon FC	1–1	0–3	2–0	—	2–0	3–0	0–0	1–1	1–1	1–1	1–2	2–0
Gimcheon Sangmu	1–1	1–1	3–2	0–3	—	1–1	0–3	1–1	1–1	1–1	0–0	1–2
Gwangju FC	2–5	0–1	0–5	0–0	1–1	—	3–2	1–2	0–0	0–3	0–1	1–1
Incheon United	0–1	1–1	1–3	0–1	2–1	4–0	—	1–0	1–0	0–1	1–2	1–2
Jeju SK	1–2	1–0	0–0	1–1	1–1	0–0	3–3	—	0–2	2–1	1–2	0–2
Jeonbuk Hyundai Motors	2–1	2–3	0–0	1–2	1–0	4–0	1–2	1–3	—	3–2	0–0	2–0
Pohang Steelers	0–1	0–0	1–0	1–0	0–1	1–0	1–1	0–2	0–2	—	0–1	0–2
FC Seoul	0–0	3–0	0–1	0–0	2–3	5–0	1–0	2–1	1–0	3–1	—	1–3
Ulsan HD	3–1	1–0	1–4	3–1	0–0	5–1	1–2	2–1	1–3	0–1	1–4	—

Source: K League 1 schedule
Legend: Blue = home team win; Yellow = draw; Red = away team win.

Matchday 1 (28 February, 1–2 March)
28 February 2026
14:00 UTC+9

Incheon United	1–2	FC Seoul
Mugoša 90+2' (pen.)		47' Song Min-kyu; 61' Cho Young-wook

Incheon Football Stadium, Incheon
Attendance: 18,108 (Sold out)
Referee: Song Min-seok
28 February 2026
14:00 UTC+9

Ulsan HD	3–1	Gangwon FC
Yago 19', 45+3'; Lee Hee-gyun 86'		90+4' Hleihel

Ulsan Munsu Football Stadium, Ulsan
Attendance: 11,036
Referee: Park Byeong-jin
28 February 2026
16:30 UTC+9

Gimcheon Sangmu	1–1	Pohang Steelers
Go Jae-hyun 4'		55' Tranziska

Gimcheon Stadium, Gimcheon
Attendance: 4,377
Referee: Kim Dae-yong
1 March 2026
14:00 UTC+9

Jeonbuk Hyundai Motors	2–3	Bucheon FC 1995
Lee Dong-jun 13', 54'		26', 54' (pen.) Galego; 83' Montaño

Jeonju World Cup Stadium, Jeonju
Attendance: 20,681
Referee: Seol Tae-hwan
1 March 2026
16:30 UTC+9

Jeju SK	0–0	Gwangju FC

Jeju World Cup Stadium, Seogwipo, Jeju Province
Attendance: 8,891
Referee: Ko Hyung-jin
2 March 2026
14:00 UTC+9

Daejeon Hana Citizen	1–1	FC Anyang
Seo Jin-su 54'		63' (pen.) Matheus Oliveira

Daejeon World Cup Stadium, Daejeon
Attendance: 14,787
Referee: Shin Yong-jun

Matchday 2 (7–8, 28 March, 15 April)
7 March 2026
16:30 UTC+9

Gwangju FC	3–2	Incheon United
Choi Kyoung-rok 38'; Sin Chang-moo 58' (pen.), 72'		45+1' Oh Hu-seong; 90+7' Seo Jae-min

Gwangju World Cup Stadium, Gwangju
Attendance: 7,574
Referee: Choi Hyun-jai
7 March 2026
16:30 UTC+9

Bucheon FC 1995	1–1	Daejeon Hana Citizen
Galego 72' (pen.)		90+7' Seo Jin-su

Bucheon Stadium, Bucheon
Attendance: 10,224 (Sold out)
Referee: Chae Sang-hyeop
8 March 2026
14:00 UTC+9

Gimcheon Sangmu	1–1	Jeonbuk Hyundai Motors
Hong Yun-sang 50'		90+2' Bruno Mota

Gimcheon Stadium, Gimcheon
Attendance: 3,323
Referee: Shin Yong-jun
8 March 2026
16:30 UTC+9

FC Anyang	2–1	Jeju SK
Matheus Oliveira 87' (pen.), 90+5'		90+3' (pen.) Negueba

Anyang Stadium, Anyang
Attendance: 10,021
Referee: Choi Cheol-jun
28 March 2026
15:00 UTC+9

Pohang Steelers	1–0	Gangwon FC
Lee Ho-jae 71'

Pohang Steel Yard, Pohang
Attendance: 7,385
Referee: Kim Jong-hyeok
15 April 2026
19:30 UTC+9

Ulsan HD	1–4	FC Seoul
Marcão 67'		4' Acevedo; 10' (o.g.) Michel; 30', 53' Song Min-kyu

Ulsan Munsu Football Stadium, Ulsan
Attendance: 6,567
Referee: Shin Yong-jun

Matchday 3 (14–15 March)
14 March 2026
14:00 UTC+9

Gwangju FC	0–0	Jeonbuk Hyundai Motors

Gwangju World Cup Stadium, Gwangju
Attendance: 7,006
Referee: Song Min-seok
14 March 2026
16:30 UTC+9

Daejeon Hana Citizen	1–1	Gimcheon Sangmu
Ha Chang-rae 68'		41' Lee Kun-hee

Daejeon World Cup Stadium, Daejeon
Attendance: 6,494
Referee: Ko Hyung-jin
15 March 2026
14:00 UTC+9

Bucheon FC 1995	1–2	Ulsan HD
Kim Min-jun 9'		39' Yago; 70' (pen.) Lee Dong-gyeong

Bucheon Stadium, Bucheon
Attendance: 8,558
Referee: Kim Dae-yong
15 March 2026
14:00 UTC+9

Jeju SK	1–2	FC Seoul
Choi Byeong-wook 88'		53' Ros; 90+4' Lee Seung-mo

Jeju World Cup Stadium, Seogwipo, Jeju Province
Attendance: 7,518
Referee: Park Byeong-jin
15 March 2026
16:30 UTC+9

Gangwon FC	1–1	FC Anyang
Park Sang-hyeok 6'		18' Choi Geon-ju

Gangneung HIGH1 ARENA, Gangneung
Attendance: 6,087
Referee: Kim Jong-hyeok
15 March 2026
16:30 UTC+9

Pohang Steelers	1–1	Incheon United
Lee Ho-jae 46'		43' Mugoša

Pohang Steel Yard, Pohang
Attendance: 10,510
Referee: Seol Tae-hwan

Matchday 4 (17–18 March)
17 March 2026
19:30 UTC+9

Gimcheon Sangmu	1–1	Gwangju FC
Go Jae-hyun 90+8'		69' (pen.) Friðjónsson

Gimcheon Stadium, Gimcheon
Attendance: 1,044
Referee: Chae Sang-hyeop
18 March 2026
19:30 UTC+9

Bucheon FC 1995	0–0	Gangwon FC

Bucheon Stadium, Bucheon
Attendance: 3,132
Referee: Choi Cheol-jun
18 March 2026
19:30 UTC+9

Incheon United	1–3	Daejeon Hana Citizen
Mugoša 36'		9' Ishida; 85' Diogo; 90+4' Um Won-sang

Incheon Football Stadium, Incheon
Attendance: 6,360
Referee: Kim Jong-hyeok
18 March 2026
19:30 UTC+9

Jeju SK	0–2	Ulsan HD
		47' Jung Seung-hyun; 63' Yago

Jeju World Cup Stadium, Seogwipo, Jeju Province
Attendance: 2,832
Referee: Song Min-seok
18 March 2026
19:30 UTC+9

Jeonbuk Hyundai Motors	2–1	FC Anyang
Kim Jeong-hoon 10' (o.g.); Bruno Mota 86'		26' Kim Woon

Jeonju World Cup Stadium, Jeonju
Attendance: 6,650
Referee: Ko Hyung-jin
18 March 2026
19:30 UTC+9

Pohang Steelers	0–1	FC Seoul
		4' Cho Young-wook

Pohang Steel Yard, Pohang
Attendance: 4,177
Referee: Shin Yong-jun

Matchday 5 (21–22 March)
21 March 2026
14:00 UTC+9

Daejeon Hana Citizen	0–1	Jeonbuk Hyundai Motors
		45+3' Lee Dong-jun

Daejeon World Cup Stadium, Daejeon
Attendance: 12,550
Referee: Seol Tae-hwan
22 March 2026
14:00 UTC+9

FC Seoul	5–0	Gwangju FC
Son Jeong-beom 9'; Klimala 47', 73'; Ros 59'; Lee Seung-mo 82'

Seoul World Cup Stadium, Seoul
Attendance: 24,122
Referee: Kim Woo-sung
22 March 2026
14:00 UTC+9

Ulsan HD	0–0	Gimcheon Sangmu

Ulsan Munsu Football Stadium, Ulsan
Attendance: 11,655
Referee: Park Byeong-jin
22 March 2026
16:30 UTC+9

FC Anyang	0–1	Incheon United
		67' Mugoša

Anyang Stadium, Anyang
Attendance: 9,391
Referee: Chae Sang-hyeop
22 March 2026
16:30 UTC+9

Gangwon FC	1–1	Jeju SK
Hleihel 90+6'		15' Jo In-jung

Gangneung HIGH1 ARENA, Gangneung
Attendance: 5,377
Referee: Kim Dae-yong
22 March 2026
16:30 UTC+9

Pohang Steelers	0–0	Bucheon FC 1995

Pohang Steel Yard, Pohang
Attendance: 8,012
Referee: Ko Hyung-jin

Matchday 6 (4–5 April)
4 April 2026
14:00 UTC+9

Jeju SK	1–0	Bucheon FC 1995
Célestine 21'

Jeju World Cup Stadium, Seogwipo, Jeju Province
Attendance: 5,035
Referee: Kim Woo-sung
4 April 2026
14:00 UTC+9

Jeonbuk Hyundai Motors	2–0	Ulsan HD
Cho Wi-je 9'; Lee Seung-woo 90+4'

Jeonju World Cup Stadium, Jeonju
Attendance: 20,532
Referee: Kim Jong-hyeok
4 April 2026
16:30 UTC+9

Pohang Steelers	1–0	Daejeon Hana Citizen
Lee Ho-jae 29' (pen.)

Pohang Steel Yard, Pohang
Attendance: 7,625
Referee: Park Byeong-jin
4 April 2026
16:30 UTC+9

Gangwon FC	3–0	Gwangju FC
Tući 10'; Mo Jae-hyeon 13'; Lee You-hyeon 54'

Gangneung HIGH1 ARENA, Gangneung
Attendance: 4,448
Referee: Shin Yong-jun
5 April 2026
14:00 UTC+9

FC Anyang	1–1	FC Seoul
Airton 78'		45' Klimala

Anyang Stadium, Anyang
Attendance: 11,542
Referee: Song Min-seok
5 April 2026
16:30 UTC+9

Incheon United	2–1	Gimcheon Sangmu
Mugoša 10', 45+4' (pen.)		56' Go Jae-hyun

Incheon Football Stadium, Incheon
Attendance: 8,239
Referee: Choi Cheol-jun

Matchday 7 (11–12 April)
11 April 2026
14:00 UTC+9

Pohang Steelers	0–2	Jeju SK
		17' Jang Min-gyu; 27' Shin Sang-eun

Pohang Steel Yard, Pohang
Attendance: 7,827
Referee: Shin Yong-jun
11 April 2026
14:00 UTC+9

FC Seoul	1–0	Jeonbuk Hyundai Motors
Klimala 90+5'

Seoul World Cup Stadium, Seoul
Attendance: 34,068
Referee: Park Byeong-jin
11 April 2026
16:30 UTC+9

Gwangju FC	0–1	Bucheon FC 1995
		54' Galego

Gwangju World Cup Stadium, Gwangju
Attendance: 2,842
Referee: Kim Jong-hyeok
11 April 2026
16:30 UTC+9

Incheon United	1–2	Ulsan HD
Mugoša 71'		23' Yago; 90+6' Marcão

Incheon Football Stadium, Incheon
Attendance: 11,358
Referee: Song Min-seok
12 April 2026
14:00 UTC+9

Daejeon Hana Citizen	0–2	Gangwon FC
		34' Kim Dae-won; 90+2' (o.g.) Kim Moon-hwan

Daejeon World Cup Stadium, Daejeon
Attendance: 7,082
Referee: Kim Dae-yong
12 April 2026
16:30 UTC+9

Gimcheon Sangmu	1–1	FC Anyang
Park Cheol-woo 90+7'		58' Kim Young-chan

Gimcheon Stadium, Gimcheon
Attendance: 1,832
Referee: Ko Hyung-jin

Matchday 8 (18–19 April)
18 April 2026
14:00 UTC+9

Gangwon FC	1–1	Jeonbuk Hyundai Motors
Mo Jae-hyeon 55'		33' Tiago Orobó

Gangneung HIGH1 ARENA, Gangneung
Attendance: 7,725
Referee: Song Min-seok
18 April 2026
14:00 UTC+9

FC Seoul	0–1	Daejeon Hana Citizen
		16' Yu Kang-hyun

Seoul World Cup Stadium, Seoul
Attendance: 22,053
Referee: Kim Jong-hyeok
18 April 2026
16:30 UTC+9

Jeju SK	1–1	Gimcheon Sangmu
Oh Jae-hyeok 48'		28' Park Tae-jun

Jeju World Cup Stadium, Seogwipo, Jeju Province
Attendance: 2,937
Referee: Park Byeong-jin
18 April 2026
16:30 UTC+9

Bucheon FC 1995	2–2	Incheon United
Shin Jae-won 64'; Vitor Gabriel 80'		12' Ferrier; 22' Gerso

Bucheon Stadium, Bucheon
Attendance: 9,314
Referee: Shin Yong-jun
19 April 2026
14:00 UTC+9

Ulsan HD	5–1	Gwangju FC
Jung Seung-hyun 19'; Marcão 27', 57' (pen.); Heo Yool 90'; Lee Dong-gyeong 90+4' (pen.)		21' Sin Chang-moo

Ulsan Munsu Football Stadium, Ulsan
Attendance: 8,962
Referee: Ko Hyung-jin
19 April 2026
16:30 UTC+9

Pohang Steelers	0–1	FC Anyang
		68' Choi Geon-ju

Pohang Steel Yard, Pohang
Attendance: 8,403
Referee: Lee Dong-jun

Matchday 9 (21–22 April)
21 April 2026
19:30 UTC+9

Gimcheon Sangmu	0–3	Gangwon FC
		36', 45+4' (pen.) Kim Dae-won; 83' Hleihel

Gimcheon Stadium, Gimcheon
Attendance: 1,125
Referee: Shin Yong-jun
21 April 2026
19:30 UTC+9

FC Seoul	3–0	Bucheon FC 1995
Klimala 31' (pen.); Moon Seon-min 45+8'; Hwang Do-yun 68'

Seoul World Cup Stadium, Seoul
Attendance: 10,257
Referee: Song Min-seok
21 April 2026
19:30 UTC+9

Jeonbuk Hyundai Motors	1–2	Incheon United
Cho Wi-je 13'		40' (pen.) Lee Myung-joo; 59' Lee Dong-ryul

Jeonju World Cup Stadium, Jeonju
Attendance: 8,074
Referee: Kim Jong-hyeok
22 April 2026
19:30 UTC+9

Daejeon Hana Citizen	0–1	Jeju SK
		44' Park Chang-jun

Daejeon World Cup Stadium, Daejeon
Attendance: 2,908
Referee: Ko Hyung-jin
22 April 2026
19:30 UTC+9

FC Anyang	1–1	Ulsan HD
Airton 4'		81' Heo Yool

Anyang Stadium, Anyang
Attendance: 5,076
Referee: Kim Dae-yong
22 April 2026
19:30 UTC+9

Pohang Steelers	1–0	Gwangju FC
Lee Ho-jae 4'

Pohang Steel Yard, Pohang
Attendance: 4,533
Referee: Park Byeong-jin

Matchday 10 (25–26 April)
25 April 2026
14:00 UTC+9

Gangwon FC	1–2	FC Seoul
Hleihel 90+6'		42' Babec; 80' Lee Seung-mo

Gangneung HIGH1 ARENA, Gangneung
Attendance: 8,259
Referee: Lee Dong-jun
25 April 2026
16:30 UTC+9

Incheon United	1–0	Jeju SK
Ferrier 69'

Incheon Football Stadium, Incheon
Attendance: 8,371
Referee: Choi Hyeon-jae
25 April 2026
16:30 UTC+9

Bucheon FC 1995	0–2	Gimcheon Sangmu
		30' Kim Ju-chan; 82' Byeon Jun-soo

Bucheon Stadium, Bucheon
Attendance: 5,119
Referee: Kim Dae-yong
26 April 2026
14:00 UTC+9

Jeonbuk Hyundai Motors	3–2	Pohang Steelers
Kim Young-bin 26'; Kim Ha-jun 44'; Kang Sang-yoon 90+5'		40' (pen.), 66' (pen.) Lee Ho-jae

Jeonju World Cup Stadium, Jeonju
Attendance: 14,501
Referee: Chae Sang-hyeop
26 April 2026
16:30 UTC+9

Gwangju FC	2–5	FC Anyang
Moon Min-seo 54', 58'		20' Herculano; 41' Kim Jeong-hyun; 45+3' Oude Kotte; 85' Kim Woon; 90+6' Airton

Gwangju World Cup Stadium, Gwangju
Attendance: 2,667
Referee: Choi Cheol-jun
26 April 2026
16:30 UTC+9

Ulsan HD	1–4	Daejeon Hana Citizen
Lee Dong-gyeong 89'		16' Ludwigson; 42' Jeong Jae-hee; 45+2' Diogo; 53' Ishida

Ulsan Munsu Football Stadium, Ulsan
Attendance: 14,618
Referee: Seol Tae-hwan

Matchday 11 (2 May)
2 May 2026
14:00 UTC+9

FC Seoul	2–3	Gimcheon Sangmu
Al-Arab 37'; Babec 60'		30' Go Jae-hyun; 71' Park Tae-jun; 80' Kim In-gyun

Seoul World Cup Stadium, Seoul
Attendance: 22,337
Referee: Kim Woo-sung
2 May 2026
14:00 UTC+9

Ulsan HD	0–1	Pohang Steelers
		90+5' Cho Sang-hyeok

Ulsan Munsu Football Stadium, Ulsan
Attendance: 16,413
Referee: Kim Jong-hyeok
2 May 2026
16:30 UTC+9

Incheon United	0–1	Gangwon FC
		44' Kim Dae-won

Incheon Football Stadium, Incheon
Attendance: 11,404
Referee: Ko Hyung-jin
2 May 2026
16:30 UTC+9

Jeju SK	0–2	Jeonbuk Hyundai Motors
		37' Kim Jin-gyu; 90+4' Tiago Orobó

Jeju World Cup Stadium, Seogwipo, Jeju Province
Attendance: 8,568
Referee: Song Min-seok
2 May 2026
19:00 UTC+9

FC Anyang	0–1	Bucheon FC 1995
		71' Vitor Gabriel

Anyang Stadium, Anyang
Attendance: 7,664
Referee: Park Byeong-jin
2 May 2026
19:00 UTC+9

Gwangju FC	0–5	Daejeon Hana Citizen
		7' Diogo; 32', 54' Jeong Jae-hee; 52' Kim Jun-beom; 61' Joo Min-kyu

Gwangju World Cup Stadium, Gwangju
Attendance: 3,186
Referee: Shin Yong-jun

Matchday 12 (5 May)
5 May 2026
14:00 UTC+9

Jeonbuk Hyundai Motors	4–0	Gwangju FC
Oberdan 43'; Kim Seung-sub 50'; Tiago Orobó 87'; Lee Seung-woo 90+8' (pen.)

Jeonju World Cup Stadium, Jeonju
Attendance: 20,364
Referee: Kim Dae-yong
5 May 2026
14:00 UTC+9

Bucheon FC 1995	0–1	Jeju SK
		75' Nam Tae-hee

Bucheon Stadium, Bucheon
Attendance: 8,183
Referee: Lee Dong-jun
5 May 2026
16:30 UTC+9

Gimcheon Sangmu	1–2	Ulsan HD
Lee Kun-hee 75'		40' Marcão; 62' Yago

Gimcheon Stadium, Gimcheon
Attendance: 3,603
Referee: Choi Hyun-jai
5 May 2026
16:30 UTC+9

Daejeon Hana Citizen	0–0	Incheon United

Daejeon World Cup Stadium, Daejeon
Attendance: 11,670
Referee: Kim Jong-hyeok
5 May 2026
16:30 UTC+9

Gangwon FC	1–1	Pohang Steelers
Hleihel 69'		81' Cho Sang-hyeok

Pohang Steel Yard, Pohang
Attendance: 8,422
Referee: Kim Woo-sung
5 May 2026
19:00 UTC+9

FC Seoul	0–0	FC Anyang

Seoul World Cup Stadium, Seoul
Attendance: 35,729
Referee: Seol Tae-hwan

Matchday 13 (9–10 May)
9 May 2026
14:00 UTC+9

Jeju SK	2–1	FC Seoul
Park Chang-jun 18'; Kim Jun-ha 53'		57' Acevedo

Jeju World Cup Stadium, Seogwipo, Jeju Province
Attendance: 6,051
Referee: Choi Cheol-jun
9 May 2026
16:30 UTC+9

Gimcheon Sangmu	0–3	Incheon United
		27' Ibiza; 45+4' Lee Dong-ryul; 52' Ferrier

Gimcheon Stadium, Gimcheon
Attendance: 2,218
Referee: Shin Yong-jun
9 May 2026
16:30 UTC+9

Gwangju FC	0–0	Gangwon FC

Gwangju World Cup Stadium, Gwangju
Attendance: 6,013
Referee: Seol Tae-hwan
9 May 2026
19:00 UTC+9

Daejeon Hana Citizen	0–2	Pohang Steelers
		68', 90+5' Juninho Rocha

Daejeon World Cup Stadium, Daejeon
Attendance: 7,605
Referee: Ko Hyung-jin
10 May 2026
14:00 UTC+9

Ulsan HD	1–0	Bucheon FC 1995
Lee Dong-gyeong 24'

Ulsan Munsu Football Stadium, Ulsan
Attendance: 14,931
Referee: Kim Woo-sung
10 May 2026
16:30 UTC+9

FC Anyang	1–1	Jeonbuk Hyundai Motors
Airton 53'		75' Lee Seung-woo

Anyang Stadium, Anyang
Attendance: 10,026
Referee: Kim Jong-hyeok

Matchday 14 (12–13 May)
12 May 2026
19:30 UTC+9

Gangwon FC	2–0	Daejeon Hana Citizen
Hleihel 87'; Kim Dae-won 89'

Gangneung HIGH1 ARENA, Gangneung
Attendance: 4,618
Referee: Lee Dong-jun
12 May 2026
19:30 UTC+9

Gwangju FC	0–1	FC Seoul
		49' Acevedo

Gwangju World Cup Stadium, Gwangju
Attendance: 1,942
Referee: Park Byeong-jin
12 May 2026
19:30 UTC+9

Incheon United	0–1	Pohang Steelers
		42' (pen.) Lee Ho-jae

Incheon Football Stadium, Incheon
Attendance: 6,620
Referee: Seol Tae-hwan
13 May 2026
19:30 UTC+9

Ulsan HD	2–1	Jeju SK
Lee Dong-gyeong 17'; Trojak 32'		88' Negueba

Ulsan Munsu Football Stadium, Ulsan
Attendance: 5,087
Referee: Kim Dae-yong
13 May 2026
19:30 UTC+9

FC Anyang	2–2	Gimcheon Sangmu
Choi Geon-ju 1'; Airton 76'		64' Lee Kun-hee; 70' Kim Ju-chan

Anyang Stadium, Anyang
Attendance: 4,509
Referee: Ko Hyung-jin
13 May 2026
19:30 UTC+9

Bucheon FC 1995	0–0	Jeonbuk Hyundai Motors

Bucheon Stadium, Bucheon
Attendance: 6,066
Referee: Choi Cheol-jun

Matchday 15 (16–17 May)
16 May 2026
16:30 UTC+9

Daejeon Hana Citizen	1–2	FC Seoul
Jeong Jae-hee 69'		23' Anserson; 87' Lee Seung-mo

Daejeon World Cup Stadium, Daejeon
Attendance: 11,687
Referee: Song Min-seok
16 May 2026
19:00 UTC+9

Incheon United	4–0	Gwangju FC
Ibiza 18'; Ferrier 25'; Gerso 54'; Lee Chung-yong 65' (pen.)

Incheon Football Stadium, Incheon
Attendance: 11,128
Referee: Kim Woo-sung
17 May 2026
16:30 UTC+9

Jeju SK	1–2	FC Anyang
Kim Ryun-seong 63'		34' Kim Dong-jin; 45' Matheus Oliveira

Jeju World Cup Stadium, Seogwipo, Jeju Province
Attendance: 6,039
Referee: Shin Yong-jun
17 May 2026
16:40 UTC+9

Jeonbuk Hyundai Motors	1–0	Gimcheon Sangmu
Tiago Orobó 90+6'

Jeonju World Cup Stadium, Jeonju
Attendance: 31,417
Referee: Choi Hyun-jai
17 May 2026
19:00 UTC+9

Gangwon FC	2–0	Ulsan HD
Choi Byeong-chan 20'; Tući 44'

Gangneung HIGH1 ARENA, Gangneung
Attendance: 8,327
Referee: Ko Hyung-jin
17 May 2026
19:00 UTC+9

Bucheon FC 1995	2–0	Pohang Steelers
Thiaguinho 60'; Lee Eui-hyung 84'

Bucheon Stadium, Bucheon
Attendance: 6,421
Referee: Kim Jong-hyeok

Matchday 16 (4–5 July)
4 July 2026
19:30 UTC+9

Jeonbuk Hyundai Motors	1–2	Gangwon FC
Lee Seung-woo 76'		25' Song Jun-seok; 53' Lee You-hyeon

Jeonju World Cup Stadium, Jeonju
Attendance: 15,551
Referee: Kim Jong-hyeok
4 July 2026
19:30 UTC+9

Daejeon Hana Citizen	2–2	Bucheon FC 1995
Joo Min-kyu 51'; Seo Jin-su 82'		54' An Tae-hyun; 59' Vitor Gabriel

Daejeon World Cup Stadium, Daejeon
Attendance: 7,736
Referee: Choi Hyun-jai
4 July 2026
19:30 UTC+9

FC Anyang	2–3	Pohang Steelers
Matheus Oliveira 45+5'; Lee Tae-hee 75'		2', 71' Wanderson; 76' Lee Ho-jae

Anyang Stadium, Anyang
Attendance: 8,210
Referee: Lee Dong-jun
5 July 2026
19:30 UTC+9

FC Seoul	1–0	Incheon United
Jeong Seung-won 81'

Seoul World Cup Stadium, Seoul
Attendance: 22,600
Referee: Shin Yong-jun
5 July 2026
19:30 UTC+9

Gimcheon Sangmu	1–1	Jeju SK
Park Cheol-woo 69'		73' Figueiredo

Gimcheon Stadium, Gimcheon
Attendance: 1,284
Referee: Park Byeong-jin
5 July 2026
19:30 UTC+9

Gwangju FC	1–1	Ulsan HD
Moon Min-seo 64'		54' Yago

Gwangju World Cup Stadium, Gwangju
Attendance: 3,516
Referee: Seol Tae-hwan

Matchday 17 (11–12 July)
11 July 2026
19:30 UTC+9

Ulsan HD	1–3	Jeonbuk Hyundai Motors
Yago 89'		30' Kim Jin-gyu; 60' Lee Seung-woo; 79' Kim Ye-geon

Ulsan Munsu Football Stadium, Ulsan
Attendance: 20,173
Referee: Kim Dae-yong
11 July 2026
19:30 UTC+9

Gimcheon Sangmu	1–1	Bucheon FC 1995
Go Jae-hyun 29'		32' Baek Dong-kyu

Gimcheon Stadium, Gimcheon
Attendance: 1,467
Referee: Kim Woo-sung
11 July 2026
19:30 UTC+9

Gwangju FC	0–3	Pohang Steelers
		21' Nishiya; 50' Tranziska; 72' Jung Han-min

Gwangju World Cup Stadium, Gwangju
Attendance: 3,633
Referee: Song Min-seok
12 July 2026
19:30 UTC+9

Jeju SK	0–0	Daejeon Hana Citizen

Jeju World Cup Stadium, Seogwipo, Jeju Province
Attendance: 4,028
Referee: Ko Hyung-jin
12 July 2026
19:30 UTC+9

Incheon United	0–1	FC Anyang
		4' Kwon Kyung-won

Incheon Football Stadium, Incheon
Attendance: 10,616
Referee: Choi Cheol-jun
12 July 2026
19:30 UTC+9

FC Seoul	0–0	Gangwon FC

Seoul World Cup Stadium, Seoul
Attendance: 17,872
Referee: Seol Tae-hwan

Matchday 18 (18–19 July)
18 July 2026
19:30 UTC+9

Daejeon Hana Citizen	2–2	Ulsan HD
Ha Chang-rae 11'; Seo Jin-su 25'		44', 67' Choi Seok-hyun

Daejeon World Cup Stadium, Daejeon
Attendance: 7,165
Referee: Choi Cheol-jun
18 July 2026
19:30 UTC+9

Gangwon FC	2–0	Gimcheon Sangmu
Kim Dae-won 22', 43'

Gangneung HIGH1 ARENA, Gangneung
Attendance: 5,810
Referee: Choi Hyun-jai
18 July 2026
19:30 UTC+9

Incheon United	1–0	Jeonbuk Hyundai Motors
Gerso 44'

Incheon Football Stadium, Incheon
Attendance: 12,984
Referee: Park Byeong-jin
18 July 2026
19:30 UTC+9

Jeju SK	2–1	Pohang Steelers
Kim Sin-jin 78'; Italo 82'		38' Tranziska

Jeju World Cup Stadium, Seogwipo, Jeju Province
Attendance: 4,225
Referee: Kim Jong-hyeok
19 July 2026
19:30 UTC+9

FC Anyang	1–1	Gwangju FC
Matheus Oliveira 57' (pen.)		90+4' Moon Min-seo

Anyang Stadium, Anyang
Attendance: 5,937
Referee: Shin Yong-jun
19 July 2026
19:30 UTC+9

Bucheon FC 1995	1–3	FC Seoul
Kim Sang-jun 63'		42' Cho Young-wook; 54' Jeong Seung-won; 90+12' Klimala

Bucheon Stadium, Bucheon
Attendance: 9,218
Referee: Lee Dong-jun

Matchday 19 (21–22 July)
21 July 2026
19:30 UTC+9

Jeju SK	1–1	Gangwon FC
Kim Sin-jin 21'		26' Goh Young-jun

Jeju World Cup Stadium, Seogwipo, Jeju Province
Attendance: 3,107
Referee: Kim Woo-sung
21 July 2026
19:30 UTC+9

Ulsan HD	1–2	Incheon United
Lee Dong-gyeong 42'		42' Ferrier; 90+3' (pen.) Mugoša

Ulsan Munsu Football Stadium, Ulsan
Attendance: 5,083
Referee: Song Min-seok
21 July 2026
19:30 UTC+9

Jeonbuk Hyundai Motors	0–0	Daejeon Hana Citizen

Jeonju World Cup Stadium, Jeonju
Attendance: 10,258
Referee: Choi Hyun-jai
22 July 2026
19:30 UTC+9

Bucheon FC 1995	2–3	FC Anyang
Vitor Gabriel 41'; Galego 70'		20' Choi Geon-ju; 51' Matheus Oliveira; 60' Kang Ji-hoon

Bucheon Stadium, Bucheon
Attendance: 3,531
Referee: Seol Tae-hwan
22 July 2026
19:30 UTC+9

Gwangju FC	1–1	Gimcheon Sangmu
Iredale 5'		7' Go Jae-hyun

Gwangju World Cup Stadium, Gwangju
Attendance: 1,385
Referee: Ko Hyung-jin
22 July 2026
19:30 UTC+9

FC Seoul	3–1	Pohang Steelers
Klimala 36'; Jeong Seung-won 69', 88'		56' Tranziska

Seoul World Cup Stadium, Seoul
Attendance: 11,139
Referee: Kim Dae-yong

Matchday 20 (25–26 July)
25 July 2026
19:30 UTC+9

Pohang Steelers	0–2	Jeonbuk Hyundai Motors
		43' Paulauskas; 90+7' Kim Young-bin

Pohang Steel Yard, Pohang
Attendance: 13,147
Referee: Shin Yong-jun
25 July 2026
19:30 UTC+9

Gimcheon Sangmu	3–2	Daejeon Hana Citizen
Lee Kun-hee 34'; Hong Yun-sang 42'; Kim Yi-seok 90+4'		13' Cho Sung-gwon; 87' Ishida

Gimcheon Stadium, Gimcheon
Attendance: 2,035
Referee: Lee Dong-jun
26 July 2026
19:30 UTC+9

FC Anyang	2–1	Gangwon FC
Choi Geon-ju 3'; Herculano 36'		90+6' Hleihel

Anyang Stadium, Anyang
Attendance: 5,461
Referee: Kim Jong-hyeok
26 July 2026
19:30 UTC+9

Gwangju FC	1–2	Jeju SK
Jung Ji-hun 10'		40' Oh Jae-hyeok; 90+2' Kwon Gi-min

Gwangju World Cup Stadium, Gwangju
Attendance: 1,999
Referee: Park Byeong-jin
26 July 2026
19:30 UTC+9

Incheon United	1–1	Bucheon FC 1995
Ferrier 84'		45+3' (o.g.) Ibiza

Incheon Football Stadium, Incheon
Attendance: 8,623
Referee: Choi Cheol-jun
26 July 2026
19:30 UTC+9

FC Seoul	1–3	Ulsan HD
Jeong Seung-won 61'		5' Erick Farias; 13' Lee Dong-gyeong; 90+8' Yago

Seoul World Cup Stadium, Seoul
Attendance: 24,343
Referee: Seol Tae-hwan

Matchday 21 (1–2 August)
1 August 2026
19:30 UTC+9

Gangwon FC	0–3	Bucheon FC 1995
		19' Galego; 60' Sung Ye-geon; 69' Vitor Gabriel

Gangneung HIGH1 ARENA, Gangneung
Attendance: 6,311
Referee: Ko Hyung-jin
1 August 2026
19:30 UTC+9

Jeonbuk Hyundai Motors	0–0	FC Seoul

Jeonju World Cup Stadium, Jeonju
Attendance: 23,081
Referee: Kim Jong-hyeok
1 August 2026
19:30 UTC+9

Pohang Steelers	0–1	Gimcheon Sangmu
		67' Lee Jung-taek

Pohang Steel Yard, Pohang
Attendance: 5,316
Referee: Seol Tae-hwan
2 August 2026
19:30 UTC+9

Ulsan HD	3–1	FC Anyang
Yago 63' (pen.); Lee Dong-gyeong 73', 77'		56' Matheus Oliveira

Ulsan Munsu Football Stadium, Ulsan
Attendance: 8,072
Referee: Park Byeong-jin
2 August 2026
19:30 UTC+9

Daejeon Hana Citizen	2–0	Gwangju FC
Ludwigson 75'; Um Won-sang 90+4'

Daejeon World Cup Stadium, Daejeon
Attendance: 4,762
Referee: Song Min-seok
2 August 2026
19:30 UTC+9

Jeju SK	3–3	Incheon United
Kim Sin-jin 13'; Figueiredo 45+1'; Matheus Aiás 56'		34', 37' Kim Geon-hui; 62' Lee Ju-yong

Jeju World Cup Stadium, Seogwipo, Jeju Province
Attendance: 4,280
Referee: Kim Dae-yong

Matchday 22 (8 August, 27 September)
8 August 2026
20:00 UTC+9

FC Anyang	1–2	Daejeon Hana Citizen
Lee Chang-yong 61'		17' Joo Min-kyu; 40' Kryvotsyuk

Anyang Stadium, Anyang
Attendance: 6,039
Referee: Seol Tae-hwan
8 August 2026
20:00 UTC+9

Bucheon FC 1995	0–0	Gwangju FC

Bucheon Stadium, Bucheon
Attendance: 5,187
Referee: Shin Yong-jun
8 August 2026
20:00 UTC+9

Gimcheon Sangmu	0–0	FC Seoul

Gimcheon Stadium, Gimcheon
Attendance: 2,696
Referee: Park Byeong-jin
8 August 2026
20:00 UTC+9

Jeonbuk Hyundai Motors	1–3	Jeju SK
Lee Seung-woo 58'		23' (pen.), 70', 90+8' Negueba

Jeonju World Cup Stadium, Jeonju
Attendance: 10,246
Referee: Song Min-seok
8 August 2026
20:00 UTC+9

Pohang Steelers	0–2	Ulsan HD
		65' Seo Myung-gwan; 67' Yago

Pohang Steel Yard, Pohang
Attendance: 11,453
Referee: Lee Dong-jun
27 September 2026
19:00 UTC+9

Gangwon FC	0–0	Incheon United

Gangneung HIGH1 ARENA, Gangneung
Attendance: 5,274
Referee: Park Byeong-jin

=== Matches 23–33 ===
Teams will play each other once, either at home or away.

Home \ Away	AYG	BCN	DHC	GWN	GCS	GJU	ICU	JSK	JHM	PHS	SEO	USH
FC Anyang	—	—	—	0–3	—	—	2–1	—	1–1	—	0–7	2–1
Bucheon FC 1995	1–1	—	0–5	—	0–2	0–3	—	2–2	3–2	3–0	—	—
Daejeon Hana Citizen	3–2	—	—	3–0	—	3–2	—	—	2–1	2–2	—	2–1
Gangwon FC	—	2–0	—	—	—	2–2	1–1	0–1	1–1	0–0	—	—
Gimcheon Sangmu	0–1	—	1–2	2–2	—	2–2	—	—	0–0	—	—	—
Gwangju FC	1–1	—	—	—	—	—	0–1	0–1	—	1–2	2–5	4–3
Incheon United	—	2–1	1–1	—	1–1	—	—	3–1	1–1	3–0	—	—
Jeju SK	2–0	—	3–1	—	0–0	—	—	—	—	1–2	2–1	0–0
Jeonbuk Hyundai Motors	—	—	—	—	—	2–2	—	3–2	—	2–0	1–2	1–0
Pohang Steelers	0–0	—	—	—	0–0	—	—	—	—	—	2–1	—
FC Seoul	—	1–0	4–2	1–1	2–2	—	1–0	—	—	—	—	—
Ulsan HD	—	2–1	—	2–3	3–1	—	2–1	—	—	2–2	1–0	—

Legend: Blue = home team win; Yellow = draw; Red = away team win.

Matchday 23 (15–16 August)
15 August 2026
19:30 UTC+9

Gwangju FC	1–2	Pohang Steelers
Iredale 84'		38' Tranziska; 90+7' Wanderson

Gwangju World Cup Stadium, Gwangju
Attendance: 2,452
Referee: Ko Hyung-jin
15 August 2026
19:30 UTC+9

Jeju SK	2–0	FC Anyang
Shin Sang-eun 45+1'; Yu In-soo 51'

Jeju World Cup Stadium, Seogwipo, Jeju Province
Attendance: 3,628
Referee: Shin Yong-jun
15 August 2026
19:30 UTC+9

FC Seoul	4–2	Daejeon Hana Citizen
Klimala 48'; Song Min-kyu 81', 83'; Jeong Seung-won 90+3'		39' Joo Min-kyu; 62' (o.g.) Kim Jin-su

Seoul World Cup Stadium, Seoul
Attendance: 21,311
Referee: Kim Woo-sung
16 August 2026
19:30 UTC+9

Incheon United	1–1	Gimcheon Sangmu
Mugoša 66'		87' Park Se-jin

Incheon Football Stadium, Incheon
Attendance: 8,013
Referee: Song Min-seok
16 August 2026
19:30 UTC+9

Bucheon FC 1995	3–2	Jeonbuk Hyundai Motors
Sung Ye-geon 9'; Kim Jong-woo 14'; Gaelgo 55'		59' Choi Woo-jin; 79' Park Ji-soo

Bucheon Stadium, Bucheon
Attendance: 9,268
Referee: Lee Dong-jun
16 August 2026
19:30 UTC+9

Ulsan HD	2–3	Gangwon FC
Kim Young-gwon 15'; Jung Seung-hyun 55'		35' Sekidika; 43' (o.g.) Kim Young-gwon; 82' Kim Dong-hyun

Ulsan Munsu Football Stadium, Ulsan
Attendance: 9,350
Referee: Kim Jong-hyeok

Matchday 24 (22–23 August)
22 August 2026
19:30 UTC+9

FC Anyang	0–7	FC Seoul
		7', 31' Moon Seon-min; 13' Babec; 35' Klimala; 44' Anderson; 53' Jeong Seung-won; 58' Lee Seung-mo

Anyang Stadium, Anyang
Attendance: 8,856
Referee: Kim Dae-yong
22 August 2026
19:30 UTC+9

Jeonbuk Hyundai Motors	1–0	Ulsan HD
Bruno Mota 55'

Jeonju World Cup Stadium, Jeonju
Attendance: 18,841
Referee: Ko Hyung-jin
22 August 2026
19:30 UTC+9

Bucheon FC 1995	3–0	Pohang Steelers
Galego 16'; Vitor Gabriel 32'; Kim Sang-jun 90'

Bucheon Stadium, Bucheon
Attendance: 4,283
Referee: Song Min-seok
22 August 2026
19:30 UTC+9

Jeju SK	0–0	Gimcheon Sangmu

Jeju World Cup Stadium, Seogwipo, Jeju Province
Attendance: 3,418
Referee: Seol Tae-hwan
23 August 2026
19:30 UTC+9

Daejeon Hana Citizen	3–0	Gangwon FC
Ludwigson 47'; Joo Min-kyu 56'; Jeong Jae-hee 66'

Daejeon World Cup Stadium, Daejeon
Attendance: 4,747
Referee: Park Byeong-jin
23 August 2026
19:30 UTC+9

Gwangju FC	0–1	Incheon United
		90+5' (pen.) Mugoša

Gwangju World Cup Stadium, Gwangju
Attendance: 1,975
Referee: Kim Jong-hyeok

Matchday 25 (25–26 August)
25 August 2026
19:30 UTC+9

FC Seoul	1–0	Bucheon FC 1995
Klimala 49'

Seoul World Cup Stadium, Seoul
Attendance: 11,334
Referee: Seol Tae-hwan
25 August 2026
19:30 UTC+9

Gimcheon Sangmu	0–0	Jeonbuk Hyundai Motors

Gimcheon Stadium, Gimcheon
Attendance: 2,684
Referee: Choi Cheol-jun
25 August 2026
19:30 UTC+9

Jeju SK	1–2	Pohang Steelers
Célestine 90+2'		15' Won Ki-jong; 49' Nishiya

Jeju World Cup Stadium, Seogwipo, Jeju Province
Attendance: 2,538
Referee: Park Byeong-jin
26 August 2026
19:30 UTC+9

FC Anyang	2–1	Incheon United
Matheus Oliveira 45+1', 84'		40' Lee Dong-ryul

Anyang Stadium, Anyang
Attendance: 4,596
Referee: Lee Dong-jun
26 August 2026
19:30 UTC+9

Daejeon Hana Citizen	2–1	Ulsan HD
Jeong Jae-hee 90+4'; Ludwigson 90+7'		49' Lee Jin-hyun

Daejeon World Cup Stadium, Daejeon
Attendance: 4,077
Referee: Shin Yong-jun
26 August 2026
19:30 UTC+9

Gangwon FC	2–2	Gwangju FC
Tući 88'; Kim Dong-hyun 89'		5', 45' (pen.) Moon Min-seo

Gangneung HIGH1 ARENA, Gangneung
Attendance: 3,836
Referee: Kim Woo-sung

Matchday 26 (29–30 August)
29 August 2026
19:30 UTC+9

Ulsan HD	3–1	Gimcheon Sangmu
Yago 44', 75'; Kang Sang-woo 62'		14' Lee Kun-hee

Ulsan Munsu Football Stadium, Ulsan
Attendance: 8,546
Referee: Kim Jong-hyeok
29 August 2026
19:30 UTC+9

Bucheon FC 1995	1–1	FC Anyang
Kim Jong-woo 53'		70' Airton

Bucheon Stadium, Bucheon
Attendance: 7,066
Referee: Choi Hyun-jai
30 August 2026
19:30 UTC+9

Gwangju FC	2–5	FC Seoul
Choi Kyoung-rok 34'; Sin Chang-moo 48'		15' Son Jeong-beom; 22' Kim Jin-su; 45+8' Lee Seung-mo; 52' Jeong Seung-won; 60' Anderson

Gwangju World Cup Stadium, Gwangju
Attendance: 1,770
Referee: Song Min-seok
30 August 2026
19:30 UTC+9

Incheon United	1–1	Jeonbuk Hyundai Motors
Gerso 88'		83' Lee Seung-woo

Incheon Football Stadium, Incheon
Attendance: 11,056
Referee: Kim Dae-yong
30 August 2026
19:30 UTC+9

Jeju SK	3–1	Daejeon Hana Citizen
Matheus Aiás 29', 52'; Negueba 90+10'		76' Seo Jin-su

Jeju World Cup Stadium, Seogwipo, Jeju Province
Attendance: 2,878
Referee: Kim Woo-sung
30 August 2026
19:30 UTC+9

Gangwon FC	0–0	Pohang Steelers

Gangneung HIGH1 ARENA, Gangneung
Attendance: 5,172
Referee: Ko Hyung-jin

Matchday 27 (5–6 September)
5 September 2026
19:00 UTC+9

Bucheon FC 1995	0–5	Daejeon Hana Citizen
		23' Ishida; 38' (pen.) Diogo; 48', 82' Jeong Jae-hee; 78' Cho Sung-gwon

Bucheon Stadium, Bucheon
Attendance: 5,623
Referee: Kim Jong-hyeok
5 September 2026
19:00 UTC+9

FC Seoul	1–0	Incheon United
Lee Ju-yong 61' (o.g.)

Seoul World Cup Stadium, Seoul
Attendance: 28,288
Referee: Ko Hyung-jin
5 September 2026
19:00 UTC+9

Jeonbuk Hyundai Motors	2–0	Pohang Steelers
Lee Seung-woo 59'; Tiago Orobó 61'

Jeonju World Cup Stadium, Jeonju
Attendance: 11,716
Referee: Shin Yong-jun
5 September 2026
19:00 UTC+9

Jeju SK	0–0	Ulsan HD

Jeju World Cup Stadium, Seogwipo, Jeju Province
Attendance: 12,037
Referee: Choi Cheol-jun
6 September 2026
19:00 UTC+9

FC Anyang	0–3	Gangwon FC
		20' Mammar; 55' Kim Gun-hee; 59' Mo Jae-hyeon

Anyang Stadium, Anyang
Attendance: 6,044
Referee: Park Byeong-jin
6 September 2026
19:00 UTC+9

Gimcheon Sangmu	2–2	Gwangju FC
Kim Yi-seok 26'; Go Jae-hyun 54'		66' Iredale; 78' Friðjónsson

Gimcheon Stadium, Gimcheon
Attendance: 1,345
Referee: Lee Dong-jun

Matchday 28 (8–9 September)
8 September 2026
19:30 UTC+9

Ulsan HD	1–0	FC Seoul
Sim Sang-min 83'

Ulsan Munsu Football Stadium, Ulsan
Attendance: 7,753
Referee: Choi Hyun-jai
8 September 2026
19:30 UTC+9

Incheon United	2–1	Bucheon FC 1995
Mugoša 43'; Juan Ibiza 70'		33' Gaelgo

Incheon Football Stadium, Incheon
Attendance: 5,794
Referee: Kim Woo-sung
9 September 2026
19:30 UTC+9

Daejeon Hana Citizen	3–2	FC Anyang
Joo Min-kyu 48', 75' (pen.); Victor Bobsin 65'		10' Matheus Oliveira; 86' (pen.) Airton

Daejeon World Cup Stadium, Daejeon
Attendance: 2,944
Referee: Song Min-seok
9 September 2026
19:30 UTC+9

Gangwon FC	1–1	Jeonbuk Hyundai Motors
Hleihel 59'		15' Italo

Gangneung HIGH1 ARENA, Gangneung
Attendance: 5,066
Referee: Choi Cheol-jun
9 September 2026
19:30 UTC+9

Gwangju FC	0–1	Jeju SK
		63' Matheus Aiás

Gwangju World Cup Stadium, Gwangju
Attendance: 991
Referee: Shin Yong-jun
9 September 2026
19:30 UTC+9

Pohang Steelers	0–0	Gimcheon Sangmu

Sangju Civic Stadium, Sangju
Attendance: 2,207
Referee: Park Byeong-jin

Matchday 29 (12–13 September)
12 September 2026
16:30 UTC+9

Jeonbuk Hyundai Motors	1–2	FC Seoul
Bruno Mota 26'		3', 90+6' Klimala

Jeonju World Cup Stadium, Jeonju
Attendance: 18,821
Referee: Lee Dong-jun
12 September 2026
16:30 UTC+9

Ulsan HD	2–1	Incheon United
Jung Seung-hyun 53'; Lee Dong-gyeong 56'		73' (pen.) Mugoša

Ulsan Munsu Football Stadium, Ulsan
Attendance: 11,167
Referee: Kim Jong-hyeok
12 September 2026
16:30 UTC+9

Bucheon FC 1995	2–2	Jeju SK
Figueiredo 3' (o.g.); Galego 63'		41' Italo; 45+3' Matheus Aiás

Bucheon Stadium, Bucheon
Attendance: 6,269
Referee: Ko Hyung-jin
12 September 2026
19:00 UTC+9

Daejeon Hana Citizen	2–2	Pohang Steelers
Victor Bobsin 84'; Lee Myung-jae 88'		48' Jorge Teixeira; 51' Juninho Rocha

Daejeon World Cup Stadium, Daejeon
Attendance: 7,686
Referee: Choi Cheol-jun
13 September 2026
16:30 UTC+9

Gimcheon Sangmu	2–2	Gangwon FC
Kim Ju-chan 4'; Park Se-jin 43'		74' Park Sang-hyeok; 90+4' (pen.) Kim Dae-won

Gimcheon Stadium, Gimcheon
Attendance: 1,659
Referee: Song Min-seok
13 September 2026
19:00 UTC+9

Gwangju FC	1–1	FC Anyang
Iredale 11'		25' Chae Hyun-woo

Gwangju World Cup Stadium, Gwangju
Attendance: 2,011
Referee: Kim Dae-yong

Matchday 30 (19–20 September)
19 September 2026
16:30 UTC+9

Bucheon FC 1995	0–2	Gimcheon Sangmu
		77' Go Jae-hyun; 86' Park Se-jin

Bucheon Stadium, Bucheon
Attendance: 4,602
Referee: Lee Dong-jun
19 September 2026
19:00 UTC+9

FC Anyang	2–1	Ulsan HD
Matheus Oliveira 27'; Herculano 61' (pen.)		54' Lee Dong-gyeong

Anyang Stadium, Anyang
Attendance: 7,477
Referee: Shin Yong-jun
20 September 2026
16:30 UTC+9

Gangwon FC	0–1	Jeju SK
		36' Italo

Gangneung HIGH1 ARENA, Gangneung
Attendance: 5,790
Referee: Kim Dae-yong
20 September 2026
16:30 UTC+9

Jeonbuk Hyundai Motors	2–2	Gwangju FC
Tiago Orobó 35', 78'		44' (o.g.) Kim Tae-hyun; 90+1' Iredale

Jeonju World Cup Stadium, Jeonju
Attendance: 11,239
Referee: Park Byeong-jin
20 September 2026
19:00 UTC+9

Incheon United	1–1	Daejeon Hana Citizen
Ferrier 35'		90+3' Kang Yoon-sung

Incheon Football Stadium, Incheon
Attendance: 9,312
Referee: Choi Hyun-jai
20 September 2026
19:00 UTC+9

Pohang Steelers	2–1	FC Seoul
Nishiya 3'; Hwang Seo-woong 39'		51' (pen.) Klimala

Sangju Civic Stadium, Sangju
Attendance: 4,034
Referee: Song Min-seok

Matchday 31 (9–11 October)
9 October 2026
14:00 UTC+9

Daejeon Hana Citizen	2–1	Jeonbuk Hyundai Motors
Ishida 56'; Diogo 84'		45' Tiago Orobó

Daejeon World Cup Stadium, Daejeon
Attendance: 15,420
Referee: Kim Dae-yong
9 October 2026
16:30 UTC+9

Gangwon FC	2–0	Bucheon FC 1995
Kim Dae-won 72' (pen.); Kim Gun-hee 80'

Gangneung HIGH1 ARENA, Gangneung
Attendance: 6,398
Referee: Shin Yong-jun
9 October 2026
16:30 UTC+9

Incheon United	3–0	Pohang Steelers
Lee Min-hyeok 17'; Lee Chung-yong 40'; Mugoša 45+2'

Incheon Football Stadium, Incheon
Attendance: 12,189
Referee: Ko Hyung-jin
10 October 2026
14:00 UTC+9

FC Seoul	2–1	Jeju SK
Moon Seon-min 46'; Klimala 79'		72' Lee Kun-hee

Seoul World Cup Stadium, Seoul
Attendance: 23,403
Referee: Kim Jong-hyeok
10 October 2026
16:30 UTC+9

Gimcheon Sangmu	0–1	FC Anyang
		38' Knežević

Gimcheon Stadium, Gimcheon
Attendance: 2,363
Referee: Park Byeong-jin
11 October 2026
14:00 UTC+9

Gwangju FC	4–3	Ulsan HD
Ba Loua 36', 77'; Iredale 39'; Sin Chang-moo 66'		30', 90+7' (pen.) Yago; 43' Kim Young-gwon

Gwangju World Cup Stadium, Gwangju
Attendance: 6,763
Referee: Lee Dong-jun

Matchday 32 (17–18 October)
17 October 2026
16:30 UTC+9

Ulsan HD	2–1	Bucheon FC 1995
Lee Jin-hyun 54'; Yago 83'		15' Park Jeong-in

Ulsan Munsu Football Stadium, Ulsan
Attendance: 25,017
Referee: Kim Dae-yong
18 October 2026
14:00 UTC+9

Daejeon Hana Citizen	3–2	Gwangju FC
Seo Jin-su 74' (pen.); Diogo 78'; Moon Min-seo 90+9' (o.g.)		3', 28' Iredale

Daejeon World Cup Stadium, Daejeon
Attendance: 6,695
Referee: Kim Woo-sung
18 October 2026
14:00 UTC+9

Jeonbuk Hyundai Motors	3–2	Jeju SK
Tiago Orobó 32', 60'; Kim Young-bin 47'		45+10' (pen.), 90+1' (pen.) Negueba

Jeonju World Cup Stadium, Jeonju
Attendance: 11,469
Referee: Song Min-seok
18 October 2026
16:30 UTC+9

FC Seoul	2–2	Gimcheon Sangmu
Klimala 22', 52'		45+1' (pen.) Lee Sang-heon; 67' (pen.) Kim In-gyun

Seoul World Cup Stadium, Seoul
Attendance: 13,788
Referee: Choi Cheol-jun
18 October 2026
16:30 UTC+9

Gangwon FC	1–1	Incheon United
Kim Dae-won 42'		23' (pen.) Mugoša

Gangneung HIGH1 ARENA, Gangneung
Attendance: 5,558
Referee: Seol Tae-hwan
18 October 2026
16:30 UTC+9

Pohang Steelers	0–0	FC Anyang

Pohang Steel Yard, Pohang
Attendance: 9,212
Referee: Choi Hyun-jai

Matchday 33 (24 October)
24 October 2026
14:00 UTC+9

Ulsan HD	2–2	Pohang Steelers
Kim Young-gwon 61'; Lee Dong-gyeong 68'		2' Wanderson; 25' Kim Seung-ho

Ulsan Munsu Football Stadium, Ulsan
Attendance: 15,228
Referee: Park Byeong-jin
24 October 2026
14:00 UTC+9

FC Anyang	1–1	Jeonbuk Hyundai Motors
Kim Woon 45+1'		90+2' Tiago Orobó

Anyang Stadium, Anyang
Attendance: 9,126
Referee: Ko Hyung-jin
24 October 2026
14:00 UTC+9

Bucheon FC 1995	0–3	Gwangju FC
		45', 65' Iredale; 60' Ba Loua

Bucheon Stadium, Bucheon
Attendance: 6,076
Referee: Chae Sang-hyeop
24 October 2026
14:00 UTC+9

Gimcheon Sangmu	1–2	Daejeon Hana Citizen
Jeong Jae-min 73'		51' Diogo; 90+6' Ludwigson

Gimcheon Stadium, Gimcheon
Attendance: 1,614
Referee: Kim Jong-hyeok
24 October 2026
14:00 UTC+9

Incheon United	3–1	Jeju SK
Lee Myung-joo 59'; Lee Dong-ryul 81'; Lee Chung-yong 90+1'		72' Negueba

Incheon Football Stadium, Incheon
Attendance: 11,541
Referee: Shin Yong-jun
24 October 2026
14:00 UTC+9

FC Seoul	1–1	Gangwon FC
Moon Seon-min 58'		65' Kang Jun-hyuk

Seoul World Cup Stadium, Seoul
Attendance: 30,022
Referee: Lee Dong-jun

=== Matches 34–38 ===
Teams will play each other once, either at home or away.

==== Final A ====
Home \ Away	DHC	GWN	ICU	JHM	SEO	USH
Daejeon Hana Citizen	—	—	2–0	—	—	6 Dec
Gangwon FC	1–3	—	—	3–2	6 Dec	—
Incheon United	—	29 Nov	—	—	—	2–1
Jeonbuk Hyundai Motors	0–0	—	6 Dec	—	0–1	—
FC Seoul	28 Nov	—	0–1	—	—	1–2
Ulsan HD	—	2–1	—	29 Nov	—	—

Updated to match(es) played on 21 November 2026. Source: K League
Legend: Blue = home team win; Yellow = draw; Red = away team win.

Matchday 34 (31 October-1 November)
31 October 2026
14:00 UTC+9

Jeonbuk Hyundai Motors	0–0	Daejeon Hana Citizen

Jeonju World Cup Stadium, Jeonju
Attendance: 7,654
Referee: Shin Yong-jun
1 November 2026
14:00 UTC+9

Ulsan HD	2–1	Gangwon FC
Erick Farias 69', 85'		41' (o.g.) Hwang Byeong-geun

Ulsan Munsu Football Stadium, Ulsan
Attendance: 7,038
Referee: Kim Yong-woo
1 November 2026
16:30 UTC+9

FC Seoul	0–1	Incheon United
		90+6' Gerso

Seoul World Cup Stadium, Seoul
Attendance: 12,050
Referee: Park Byeong-jin

Matchday 35 (8 November)
8 November 2026
14:00 UTC+9

FC Seoul	1–2	Ulsan HD
Lee Han-do 75'		35' Lee Dong-gyeong; 90' Yago

Seoul World Cup Stadium, Seoul
Attendance: 13,037
Referee: Chae Sang-hyeop
8 November 2026
14:00 UTC+9

Daejeon Hana Citizen	2–0	Incheon United
Diogo 71'; Lee Myung-jae 79'

Daejeon World Cup Stadium, Daejeon
Attendance: 6,387
Referee: Choi Cheol-jun
8 November 2026
16:30 UTC+9

Gangwon FC	3–2	Jeonbuk Hyundai Motors
Shin Min-ha 13'; Mo Jae-hyeon 39'; Park Sang-hyeok 90+4'		9' (pen.) Compagno; 86' Lee Dong-jun

Gangneung HIGH1 ARENA, Gangneung
Attendance: 4,206
Referee: Choi Hyun-jai

Matchday 36 (21 November)
21 November 2026
14:00 UTC+9

Jeonbuk Hyundai Motors	0–1	FC Seoul
		54' Anderson

Jeonju World Cup Stadium, Jeonju
Attendance: 8,411
Referee: Kim Dae-yong
21 November 2026
16:30 UTC+9

Gangwon FC	1–3	Daejeon Hana Citizen
Choe Byeong-chan 24'		38' Diogo; 53' Ludwigson; 84' Ishida

Gangneung HIGH1 ARENA, Gangneung
Attendance: 4,578
Referee: Song Min-seok
21 November 2026
16:30 UTC+9

Incheon United	2–1	Ulsan HD
Mugoša 23'; Gerso 84'		87' Kim Young-gwon

Incheon Football Stadium, Incheon
Attendance: 8,971
Referee: Park Byeong-jin

Matchday 37 (28-29 November)
28 November 2026
14:00 UTC+9

FC Seoul	v	Daejeon Hana Citizen

Seoul World Cup Stadium, Seoul
29 November 2026
14:00 UTC+9

Ulsan HD	v	Jeonbuk Hyundai Motors

Ulsan Munsu Football Stadium, Ulsan
29 November 2026
16:30 UTC+9

Incheon United	v	Gangwon FC

Incheon Football Stadium, Incheon

Matchday 38 (6 December)
6 December 2026
14:00 UTC+9

Daejeon Hana Citizen	v	Ulsan HD

Daejeon World Cup Stadium, Daejeon
6 December 2026
14:00 UTC+9

Gangwon FC	v	FC Seoul

Gangneung HIGH1 ARENA, Gangneung
6 December 2026
14:00 UTC+9

Jeonbuk Hyundai Motors	v	Incheon United

Jeonju World Cup Stadium, Jeonju

==== Final B ====
Home \ Away	AYG	BCN	GCS	GJU	JSK	PHS
FC Anyang	—	2–1	—	5 Dec	28 Nov	—
Bucheon FC 1995	—	—	28 Nov	—	—	2–2
Gimcheon Sangmu	1–0	—	—	—	0–1	5 Dec
Gwangju FC	—	4–2	1–1	—	—	—
Jeju SK	—	5 Dec	—	1–1	—	—
Pohang Steelers	1–1	—	—	28 Nov	1–1	—

Updated to match(es) played on 22 November 2026. Source: K League
Legend: Blue = home team win; Yellow = draw; Red = away team win.

Matchday 34 (31 October-1 November)
31 October 2026
16:30 UTC+9

Gwangju FC	1–1	Gimcheon Sangmu
Iredale 76'		64' Kim In-gyun

Gwangju World Cup Stadium, Gwangju
Attendance: 1,813
Referee: Kim Dae-yong
1 November 2026
14:00 UTC+9

Pohang Steelers	1–1	Jeju SK
Wanderson 45+10' (pen.)		31' Negueba

Pohang Steel Yard, Pohang
Attendance: 3,911
Referee: Seol Tae-hwan
1 November 2026
16:30 UTC+9

FC Anyang	2–1	Bucheon FC 1995
Hong Sung-wook 55' (o.g.); Kwon Kyung-won 89'		39' Park Jeong-in

Anyang Stadium, Anyang
Attendance: 4,464
Referee: Song Min-seok

Matchday 35 (7-8 November)
7 November 2026
14:00 UTC+9

Jeju SK	1–1	Gwangju FC
Park Chang-jun 45+1'		2' Ha Seung-un

Jeju World Cup Stadium, Seogwipo, Jeju Province
Attendance: 3,039
Referee: Kim Jong-hyeok
7 November 2026
16:30 UTC+9

Gimcheon Sangmu	1–0	FC Anyang
Jeong Jae-min 66'

Gimcheon Stadium, Gimcheon
Attendance: 1,125
Referee: Kim Woo-sung
8 November 2026
16:30 UTC+9

Bucheon FC 1995	2–2	Pohang Steelers
Galego 85'; Park Jeong-in 90'		42' (o.g.) Patrick William; 54' Juninho Rocha

Bucheon Stadium, Bucheon
Attendance: 3,585
Referee: Ko Hyung-jin

Matchday 36 (21-22 November)
21 November 2026
14:00 UTC+9

Pohang Steelers	1–1	FC Anyang
Wanderson 23' (pen.)		90+5' (pen.) Matheus Oliveira

Pohang Steel Yard, Pohang
Attendance: 4,677
Referee: Shin Yong-jun
22 November 2026
14:00 UTC+9

Gimcheon Sangmu	0–1	Jeju SK
		63' (pen.) Kim Sin-jin

Gimcheon Stadium, Gimcheon
Attendance: 940
Referee: Ko Hyung-jin
22 November 2026
14:00 UTC+9

Gwangju FC	4–2	Bucheon FC 1995
Friðjónsson 37'; Ba Loua 66'; Doo Hyeon-seok 71'; Iredale 80'		22' Kim Jong-woo; 34' Kim Min-jun

Gwangju World Cup Stadium, Gwangju
Attendance: 2,545
Referee: Seol Tae-hwan

Matchday 37 (28 November)
28 November 2026
14:00 UTC+9

FC Anyang	v	Jeju SK

Anyang Stadium, Anyang
28 November 2026
16:30 UTC+9

Pohang Steelers	v	Gwangju FC

Pohang Steel Yard, Pohang
28 November 2026
16:30 UTC+9

Bucheon FC 1995	v	Gimcheon Sangmu

Bucheon Stadium, Bucheon

Matchday 38 (5 December)
5 December 2026
14:00 UTC+9

Jeju SK	v	Bucheon FC 1995

Jeju World Cup Stadium, Seogwipo, Jeju Province
5 December 2026
14:00 UTC+9

FC Anyang	v	Gwangju FC

Anyang Stadium, Anyang
5 December 2026
14:00 UTC+9

Gimcheon Sangmu	v	Pohang Steelers

Gimcheon Stadium, Gimcheon

== Relegation play-off ==
=== Promotion/Relegation play-off Bracket ===
Quarterfinals
3
6
4
5

Semifinals

Final
K1 (12)	Gwangju FC
TBD	TBD

=== Promotion play-off final ===
2026
19:00 UTC+9

v

As Gimcheon Sangmu won't finish last, the twelfth-placed team will play against the loser of the final of the promotion play-offs of the K League 2 in the relegation play-offs.

Team 1	Agg.	Team 2	1st leg	2nd leg
Loser of the final of the promotion play-offs of K League 2	agg.	Gwangju FC	1st leg	2nd leg

10 December 2026
19:00 UTC+9

v	Gwangju FC

13 December 2026
14:00 UTC+9

Gwangju FC	v

Gwangju World Cup Stadium, Gwangju

== Statistics ==
=== Top goalscorers ===
Rank	Player	Team	Goals
1	(Brazil) Yago Cariello	Ulsan HD	17
2	(Poland) Patryk Klimala	FC Seoul	16
3	(Montenegro) Stefan Mugoša	Incheon United	15
4	(Brazil) Matheus Oliveira	FC Anyang	13
4	(South Korea) Lee Dong-gyeong	Ulsan HD	13
6	(Australia) John Iredale	Gwangju FC	12
7	(Brazil) Tiago Orobó	Jeonbuk Hyundai Motors	11
7	(Brazil) Jefferson Galego	Bucheon FC 1995	11
9	(Brazil) Emerson Negueba	Jeju SK	10
9	(South Korea) Kim Dae-won	Gangwon FC	10

=== Top assist providers ===
Rank	Player	Team	Assists
1	(South Korea) Lee Dong-gyeong	Ulsan HD	13
2	(South Korea) Kim Dae-won	Gangwon FC	11
3	(South Korea) Lee Myung-jae	Daejeon Hana Citizen	8
3	(South Korea) Moon Seon-min	FC Seoul	8
3	(South Korea) Jeong Seung-won	FC Seoul	8
6	(South Korea) Lee Yeong-jae	Jeonbuk Hyundai Motors	7
6	(Brazil) Matheus Oliveira	FC Anyang	7
8	(Ivory Coast) Adriel Ba Loua	Gwangju FC	6
8	(Brazil) Anderson	FC Seoul	6
8	(South Korea) Mo Jae-hyeon	Gangwon FC	6
8	(Sweden) Gustav Ludwigson	Daejeon Hana Citizen	6

=== Hat-tricks ===
Player	For	Against	Result	Date
(Brazil) Emerson Negueba	Jeju SK	Jeonbuk Hyundai Motors	3–1	8 August 2026

== Awards ==
=== Weekly awards ===
Round	Player of the Round	
Round	Player	Club
1	(Brazil) Jefferson Galego	Bucheon FC 1995
2	(Brazil) Matheus Oliveira	FC Anyang
3	(South Korea) Lee Dong-gyeong	Ulsan HD
4	(Brazil) Diogo	Daejeon Hana Citizen
5	(Poland) Patryk Klimala	FC Seoul
6	(Montenegro) Stefan Mugoša	Incheon United
7	(South Korea) Kim Dae-won	Gangwon FC
8	(Brazil) Marcão	Ulsan HD
9	(South Korea) Kim Dae-won	Gangwon FC
10	(Japan) Masatoshi Ishida	Daejeon Hana Citizen
11	(South Korea) Kim Dae-won	Gangwon FC
12	(Brazil) Oberdan	Jeonbuk Hyundai Motors
13	(Brazil) Juninho Rocha	Pohang Steelers
14	(South Korea) Kim Hyung-geun	Bucheon FC 1995
15	(South Korea) Lee Chung-yong	Incheon United
16	(Brazil) Wanderson	Pohang Steelers
17	(South Korea) Kwon Kyung-won	FC Anyang
18	(South Korea) Kim Dae-won	Gangwon FC
19	(South Korea) Jeong Seung-won	FC Seoul

Round	Player of the Round	
Round	Player	Club
20	(South Korea) Lee Dong-gyeong	Ulsan HD
21	(South Korea) Lee Dong-gyeong	Ulsan HD
22	(Brazil) Emerson Negueba	Jeju SK
23	(Brazil) Jefferson Galego	Bucheon FC 1995
24	(South Korea) Jeong Seung-won	FC Seoul
25	(Brazil) Matheus Oliveira	FC Anyang
26	(Brazil) Yago Cariello	Ulsan HD
27	(South Korea) Jeong Jae-hee	Daejeon Hana Citizen
28	(South Korea) Joo Min-kyu	Daejeon Hana Citizen
29	(Poland) Patryk Klimala	FC Seoul
30	(Brazil) Italo	Jeju SK
31	(Ivory Coast) Adriel Ba Loua	Gwangju FC
32	(Brazil) Tiago Orobó	Jeonbuk Hyundai Motors
33	(Australia) John Iredale	Gwangju FC
34	(Brazil) Erick Farias	Ulsan HD
35	(South Korea) Mo Jae-hyeon	Gangwon FC
36		
37		
38		

=== Monthly awards ===
Month	Player of the Month		Young Player of the Month		Goal of the Month	
Month	Player	Club	Player	Club	Player	Club
February–March	(Montenegro) Stefan Mugoša	Incheon	(South Korea) Choi Seok-hyun	Ulsan	(South Korea) Lee Dong-jun	Jeonbuk
April	(South Korea) Kim Dae-won	Gangwon	(South Korea) Seo Jae-min	Incheon	(South Korea) Lee Seung-woo	Jeonbuk
May	(South Korea) Lee Gi-hyuk	Gangwon	(South Korea) Cho Sang-hyeok	Pohang	(South Korea) Kim Ju-chan	Gimcheon
July	(South Korea) Jeong Seung-won	Seoul	(South Korea) Moon Min-seo	Gwangju	(South Korea) Kim Ye-geon	Jeonbuk
August	(South Korea) Jeong Seung-won	Seoul	(South Korea) Sung Ye-geon	Bucheon	(South Korea) Kim Dong-hyun	Gangwon
September	(Poland) Patryk Klimala	Seoul	(South Korea) Hwang Seo-woong	Pohang	(Brazil) Matheus Oliveira	Anyang
October	(Ivory Coast) Adriel Ba Loua	Gwangju	(South Korea) Son Jeong-beom	Seoul	(South Korea) Lee Kun-hee	Jeju
November						

Month	Manager of the Month			Save of the Month		Delivery of the Month		
Month	Manager	Club	Div.	Player	Club	Player	Club	Div.
February–March	(South Korea) Kim Gi-dong	Seoul	1	(South Korea) Hwang In-jae	Pohang	(South Korea) Kim Min-woo	Suwon	2
April	(South Korea) Kim Gi-dong	Seoul	1	(South Korea) Lee Chang-geun	Daejeon	(Russia) Stanislav Iljutcenko	Suwon	2
May	(South Korea) Cha Du-ri	Hwaseong	2	(South Korea) Kim Hyung-geun	Bucheon	(South Korea) Lee Chung-yong	Incheon	1
July	(South Korea) Park Kun-ha	Suwon FC	2	(South Korea) Baek Jong-bum	Gimcheon	(Brazil) Anderson	Seoul	1
August	(South Korea) Kim Gi-dong	Seoul	1	(South Korea) Song Bum-keun	Jeonbuk	(Brazil) Cesinha	Daegu	2
September	(Portugal) Sérgio Costa	Jeju	1	(South Korea) Kim Jeong-hoon	Anyang	(South Korea) Lee Dong-gyeong	Ulsan	1
October	(South Korea) Yoon Jong-hwan	Incheon	1	(South Korea) Gu Sung-yun	Seoul	(South Korea) Kim Min-woo	Suwon	2
November								

=== Annual awards ===
Award	Winner	Club
Most Valuable Player		
Young Player of the Year		
Top goalscorer		
Top assist provider		
Manager of the Year		

Position	Best XI
Goalkeeper	
Defenders	
Midfielders	
Forwards	

== Attendance ==
Attendants who entered with free ticket are not counted.

== See also ==
- 2026 in South Korean football
- 2026–27 Korea Cup
- 2026 K League 2
- 2026 K3 League
- 2026 K4 League
