= Son Jeong-beom =

South Korean footballer (born 2007)

- Son in 2026

Personal information
- Date of birth: 28 September 2007 (age 19)
- Place of birth: Guri, South Korea
- Height: 1.84 m (6 ft 0 in)
- Position: Midfielder

Team information
- Current team: FC Seoul
- Number: 42

Youth career
- 2023–2025: Osan High School

Senior career*
Years	Team	Apps	(Gls)
2026–	FC Seoul	31	(2)

International career^{‡}
2024	South Korea U17	3	(1)
2026–	South Korea U23	2	(0)
- * Club domestic league appearances and goals as of 1 November 2026 ‡ National team caps and goals as of 6 June 2026

- Son Jeong-beom
- Hangul: 손정범
- RR: Son Jeongbeom
- MR: Son Chŏngbŏm

Son Jeong-beom (Korean: 손정범; born 28 September 2007) is a South Korean professional footballer who plays as a Midfielder for FC Seoul and the South Korea national team.

== Club career ==
In December 2025, Son Jeong-beom signed a professional contract with FC Seoul.

== Career statistics ==
=== Club ===
As of match played 4 November 2026

Appearances and goals by club, season and competition
Club	Season	League			Cup		Continental		Other		Total	
Club	Season	Division	Apps	Goals	Apps	Goals	Apps	Goals	Apps	Goals	Apps	Goals
FC Seoul	2026	K League 1	31	2	1	0	5 (Note: Two appearances in AFC Champions League Elite, three appearances in AFC Champions League Two)	0	—		37	2
Career total			31	2	1	0	5	0	0	0	37	2

== Honours ==
FC Seoul

- K League 1: 2026
