= Yago Cariello =

Brazilian footballer

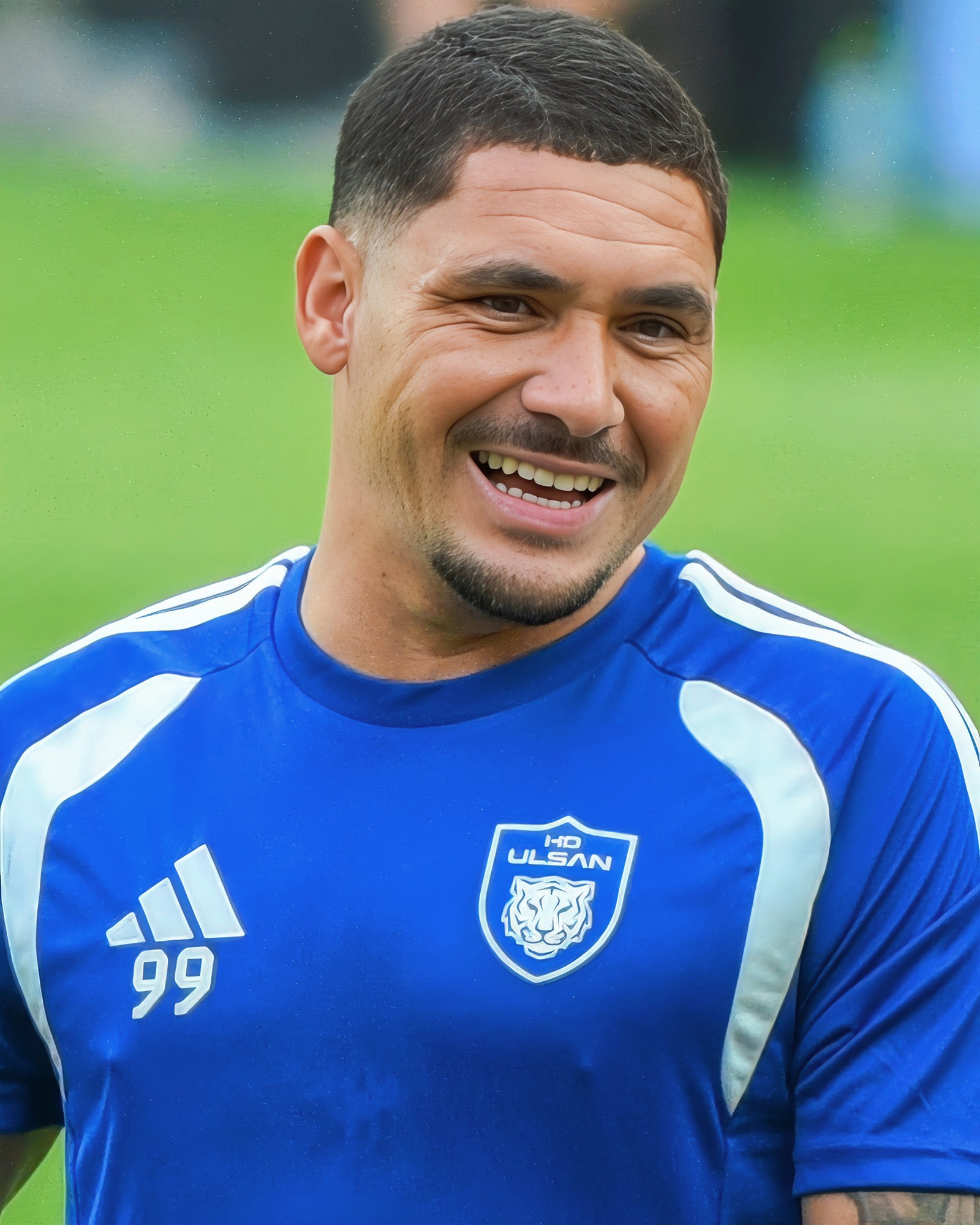
- Cariello in 2026

Personal information
- Full name: Yago Cariello Ribeiro
- Date of birth: 27 July 1999 (age 27)
- Place of birth: Rio de Janeiro, Brazil
- Height: 1.85 m (6 ft 1 in)
- Position: Striker

Team information
- Current team: Ulsan HD
- Number: 99

Youth career
- 2017–2018: America-RJ
- 2018–2020: Vasco da Gama

Senior career*
Years	Team	Apps	(Gls)
2020	Tupynambás	4	(0)
2020–2021	Condeixa	21	(4)
2021–2022	União Santarém	24	(12)
2022–2024	Portimonense	25	(3)
2023–2024	→ Gangwon FC (loan)	29	(10)
2024–	Ulsan HD	46	(21)
2025	→ Zhejiang FC (loan)	14	(10)
- * Club domestic league appearances and goals as of 16:15, 22 November 2026 (UTC)

Yago Cariello Ribeiro (born 27 July 1999), sometimes known as Yago Caju, is a Brazilian professional footballer who plays as a striker for K League 1 club Ulsan HD.

== Professional career ==
Cariello is a youth product of America-RJ, before moving to the youth side of Vasco da Gama in 2018. On 8 January 2020, he transferred to Tupynambás where he began his senior career. He then moved to Europe with a stint at Condeixa in 2020–21, followed by a move to União Santarém for the 2021–22 season where he was one of the top scorers in the Liga 3. On 2 May 2022, he signed his first professional contract with the Primeira Liga side Portimonense. Cariello made his professional debut with Portimonense in a 1–0 Primeira Liga loss to Boavista on 7 August 2022.

On 1 July 2023, Portimonense sent Cariello on a season-long loan to K League 1 side Gangwon FC.

On 6 July 2025, Cariello was loan to Chinese Super League club Zhejiang FC. On 4 January 2026, Ulsan HD announced Cariello's return after the 2025 season.

== Career statistics ==
As of match played 21 November 2026

Appearances and goals by club, season and competition
Club	Season	League			State league (Note: Includes Campeonato Mineiro)		National cup (Note: Includes Taça de Portugal, Korea Cup)		League cup (Note: Includes Taça da Liga)		Continental		Other		Total	
Club	Season	Division	Apps	Goals	Apps	Goals	Apps	Goals	Apps	Goals	Apps	Goals	Apps	Goals	Apps	Goals
Tupynambás	2020	—			4	0	—		—		—		—		4	0
Condeixa	2020–21	Campeonato de Portugal	21	4	—		—		—		—		—		21	4
União Santarém	2021–22	Liga 3	24	12	—		1	0	—		—		—		25	12
Portimonense	2022–23	Primeira Liga	25	3	—		1	0	2	0	—		—		28	3
Gangwon FC (loan)	2023	K League 1	11	1	—		—		—		—		—		11	1
Gangwon FC (loan)	2024	K League 1	18	9	—		0	0	—		—		—		18	9
Gangwon FC (loan)	Total		29	10	—		0	0	—		—		—		29	10
Ulsan HD	2024	K League 1	12	4	—		3	1	—		5 (Note: Appearances in AFC Champions League Elite)	1	—		20	6
Ulsan HD	2025	K League 1	5	0	—		0	0	—		1	0	0	0	6	0
Ulsan HD	2026	K League 1	29	17	—		0	0	—		2	0	—		31	17
Ulsan HD	Total		46	21	—		3	1	—		8	1	0	0	57	23
Zhejiang FC (loan)	2025	Chinese Super League	14	10	—		—		—		—		—		14	10
Career total			159	60	4	0	5	1	2	0	8	1	0	0	172	62
