= Jakob Tranziska =

German footballer (born 2001)

Personal information
- Date of birth: 25 June 2001 (age 25)
- Place of birth: Coburg, Germany
- Height: 1.89 m (6 ft 2 in)
- Position: Forward

Team information
- Current team: Pohang Steelers
- Number: 10

Youth career
- –2020: FC Eintracht Bamberg

Senior career*
Years	Team	Apps	(Gls)
2019–2021	FC Eintracht Bamberg	26	(23)
2022	Mainz 05 II	4	(0)
2022–2023	Admira Wacker	30	(6)
2024	České Budějovice	23	(3)
2025	1. FC Schweinfurt 05	23	(4)
2026–	Pohang Steelers	17	(3)
- * Club domestic league appearances and goals as of 3 August 2026

Jakob Tranziska (born 25 June 2001) is a German professional footballer who plays as a midfielder for K League 1 club Pohang Steelers.

== Early life ==
Tranziska was born on 25 June 2001 in Coburg, Germany.

== Career ==
As a youth player, Tranziska joined the youth academy of German side FC Eintracht Bamberg and was promoted to the club's senior team in 2019, where he made twenty-six league appearances and scored twenty-three goals. German newspaper Neue Presse Coburg wrote in 2021 that he was "the key to FC Eintracht Bamberg's success in the Bayernliga" while playing for the club. During the summer of 2022, he signed for Austrian side Admira Wacker, where he made thirty league appearances and scored six goals.

Following his stint there, he signed for Czech side České Budějovice in 2024, where he made 23 league appearances and scored three goals. One year later, he signed for German side 1. FC Schweinfurt 05, where he made twenty-three league appearances and scored four goals and helped the club achieve promotion from the fourth tier to the third tier. Ahead of the 2026 season, he signed for South Korean side Pohang Steelers.
