= Sin Chang-moo =

South Korean footballer (born 1992)

Personal information
- Full name: Sin Chang-moo
- Date of birth: 17 September 1992 (age 34)
- Place of birth: South Korea
- Height: 1.70 m (5 ft 7 in)
- Position: Midfielder

Team information
- Current team: Gwangju FC
- Number: 40

Youth career
- 2005–2007: John Paul College
- 2008–2010: Daegu FC
- 2011–2013: Woosuk University

Senior career*
Years	Team	Apps	(Gls)
2014–2020	Daegu FC	98	(4)
2018–2019	→ Sangju Sangmu (army)	37	(2)
2021–2023	Gangwon FC	26	(1)
2023–	Gwangju FC	55	(7)
- * Club domestic league appearances and goals as of 4 August 2026

Shin Chang-moo (Hanja:申 昶武, Korean: 신창무; born 17 September 1992) is a South Korean footballer who plays as midfielder for Gwangju FC in K League 1.

== Club career ==
Sin Chang-moo joined Daegu FC in January 2014. He made his professional debut goal in the league match against FC Anyang on 23 July 2016.

== Career statistics ==
As of match played on 4 August 2026

Appearances and goals by club, season and competition
Club	Season	League			National Cup		Continental		Other		Total	
Club	Season	Division	Apps	Goals	Apps	Goals	Apps	Goals	Apps	Goals	Apps	Goals
Daegu FC	2014	K League 2	12	0	2	1	—		—		14	1
Daegu FC	2015	K League 2	9	0	1	0	—		1	0	11	0
Daegu FC	2016	K League 2	31	1	2	0	—		—		33	1
Daegu FC	2017	K League 1	19	2	1	0	—		—		20	2
Daegu FC	2019	K League 1	8	1	—		—		—		36	1
Daegu FC	2020	K League 1	18	0	1	0	—		—		19	0
Daegu FC	Total		98	4	7	0	—		1	0	106	4
Sangju Sangmu (army)	2018	K League 1	21	1	0	0	—		—		21	1
Sangju Sangmu (army)	2019	K League 1	16	1	2	2	—		—		18	3
Sangju Sangmu (army)	Total		37	2	2	2	—		—		39	4
Gangwon FC	2021	K League 1	19	1	2	1	—		2	0	23	2
Gangwon FC	2022	K League 1	7	0	0	0	—		—		7	0
Gangwon FC	Total		26	1	2	1	—		2	0	30	2
Gwangju FC	2023	K League 1	9	0	3	0	—		—		12	0
Gwangju FC	2024	K League 1	14	2	4	2	5	0	—		23	4
Gwangju FC	2025	K League 1	23	2	5	1	2	0	—		30	3
Gwangju FC	2026	K League 1	9	3	0	0	0	0	—		9	3
Gwangju FC	Total		55	7	12	3	7	0	—		74	10
Career totals			216	14	23	7	7	0	3	0	249	21
