= Jefferson Galego =

Brazilian footballer

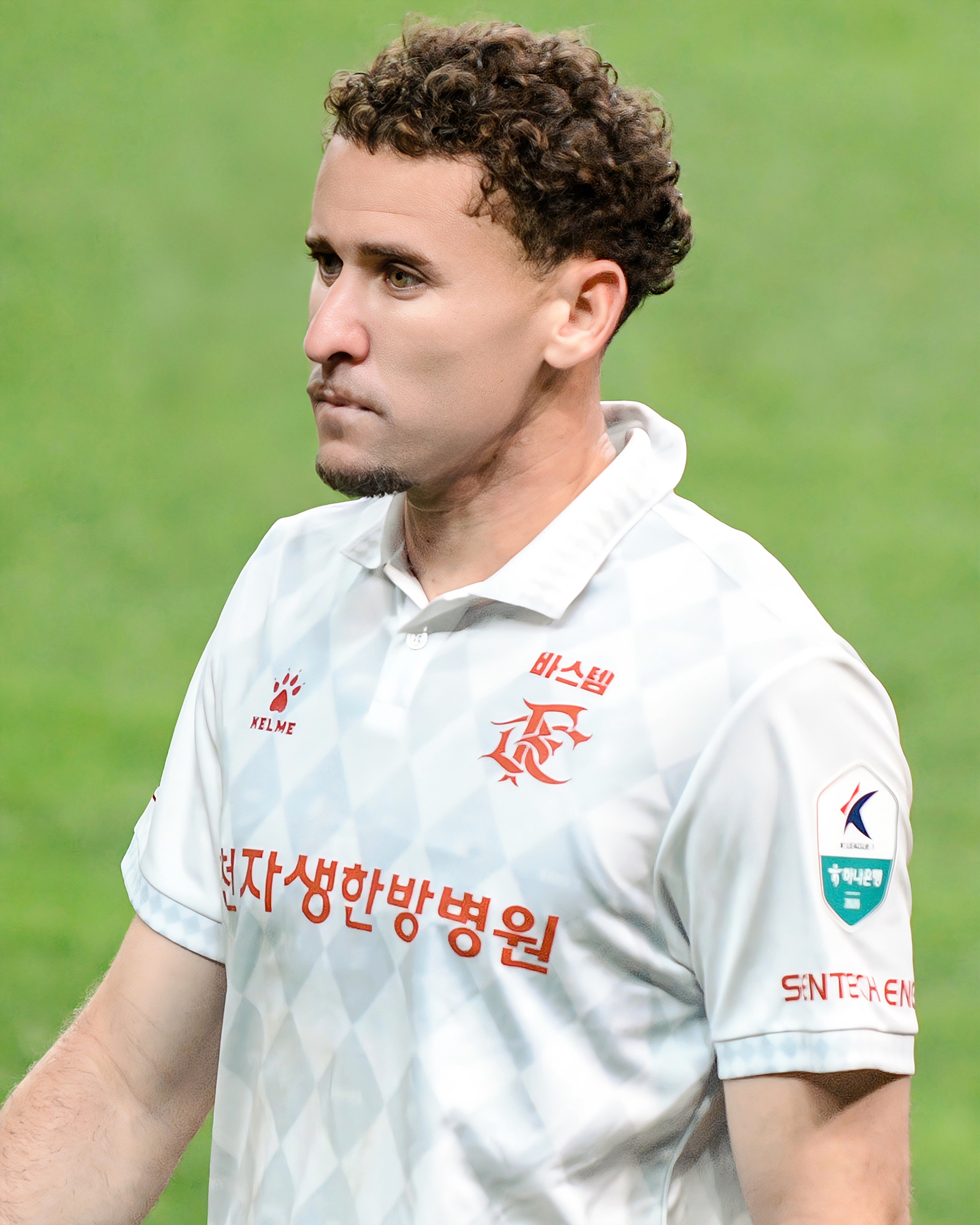
- Galego in 2026

Personal information
- Full name: Jefferson Fernando Isídio
- Date of birth: 4 April 1997 (age 29)
- Place of birth: Missão Velha, Brazil
- Height: 1.77 m (5 ft 10 in)
- Position: Winger

Team information
- Current team: Bucheon 1995
- Number: 11

Senior career*
Years	Team	Apps	(Gls)
2017	Mogi Mirim	12	(1)
2017–2018	Linense	0	(0)
2018	→ Marília (loan)	10	(1)
2018	→ Guarani de Palhoça (loan)	0	(0)
2018–2019	Bragantino	6	(0)
2019–2020	Ponte Preta	0	(0)
2020	Portuguesa Santista	12	(5)
2020–2022	Moreirense	23	(0)
2022	→ Gangwon (loan)	14	(3)
2023	Gangwon	39	(2)
2024	Jeju SK	16	(1)
2025–	Bucheon 1995	45	(11)
- * Club domestic league appearances and goals as of 4 August 2026

Jefferson Fernando Isídio (born 4 April 1997), better known as Jefferson Galego, is a Brazilian professional footballer who plays as a winger for K League 1 club Bucheon FC 1995.

== Professional career ==
Galego spent his early career with small club teams in Brazil, before signing a professional contract with Moreirense on 1 October 2020. Galego made his professional debut with Moreirense in a 0-0 Primeira Liga tie with Belenenses SAD on 18 October 2020.

== Career statistics ==
As of 4 August 2026

Club	Season	League			State League		Cup		League Cup		Continental		Other		Total	
Club	Season	Division	Apps	Goals	Apps	Goals	Apps	Goals	Apps	Goals	Apps	Goals	Apps	Goals	Apps	Goals
Mogi Mirim	2017	Série C	12	1	—		—		—		—		—		12	1
Marília (loan)	2018	Paulista A3	—		10	1	—		—		—		—		10	1
Bragantino	2019	Paulista	—		6	0	—		—		—		—		6	0
Portuguesa Santista	2020	Paulista A2	—		12	5	—		—		—		—		12	5
Moreirense	2020–21	Primeira Liga	15	0	—		1	0	—		—		—		16	0
Moreirense	2021–22	Primeira Liga	8	0	—		1	0	0	0	—		1	0	10	0
Moreirense	Total		23	0	—		2	0	0	0	—		1	0	26	0
Gangwon FC (loan)	2022	K League 1	14	3	—		—		—		—		—		14	3
Gangwon FC	2023	K League 1	33	2	—		3	2	—		—		2	0	38	4
Gangwon FC	2024	K League 1	4	0	—		2	1	—		—		—		6	1
Gangwon FC	Total		51	5	—		5	3	—		—		2	0	58	8
Jeju United	2024	K League 1	16	1	—		1	0	—		—		—		17	1
Bucheon FC 1995	2025	K League 2	25	5	—		4	2	—		—		3 (Note: Appearances in K League 1 playoff)	1	32	8
Bucheon FC 1995	2026	K League 1	20	6	—		0	0	—		—		—		20	6
Bucheon FC 1995	Total		45	11	—		4	2	—		—		3	1	52	14
Career total			147	18	28	6	12	5	0	0	0	0	6	1	193	30
