= Go Jae-hyun =

South Korean footballer

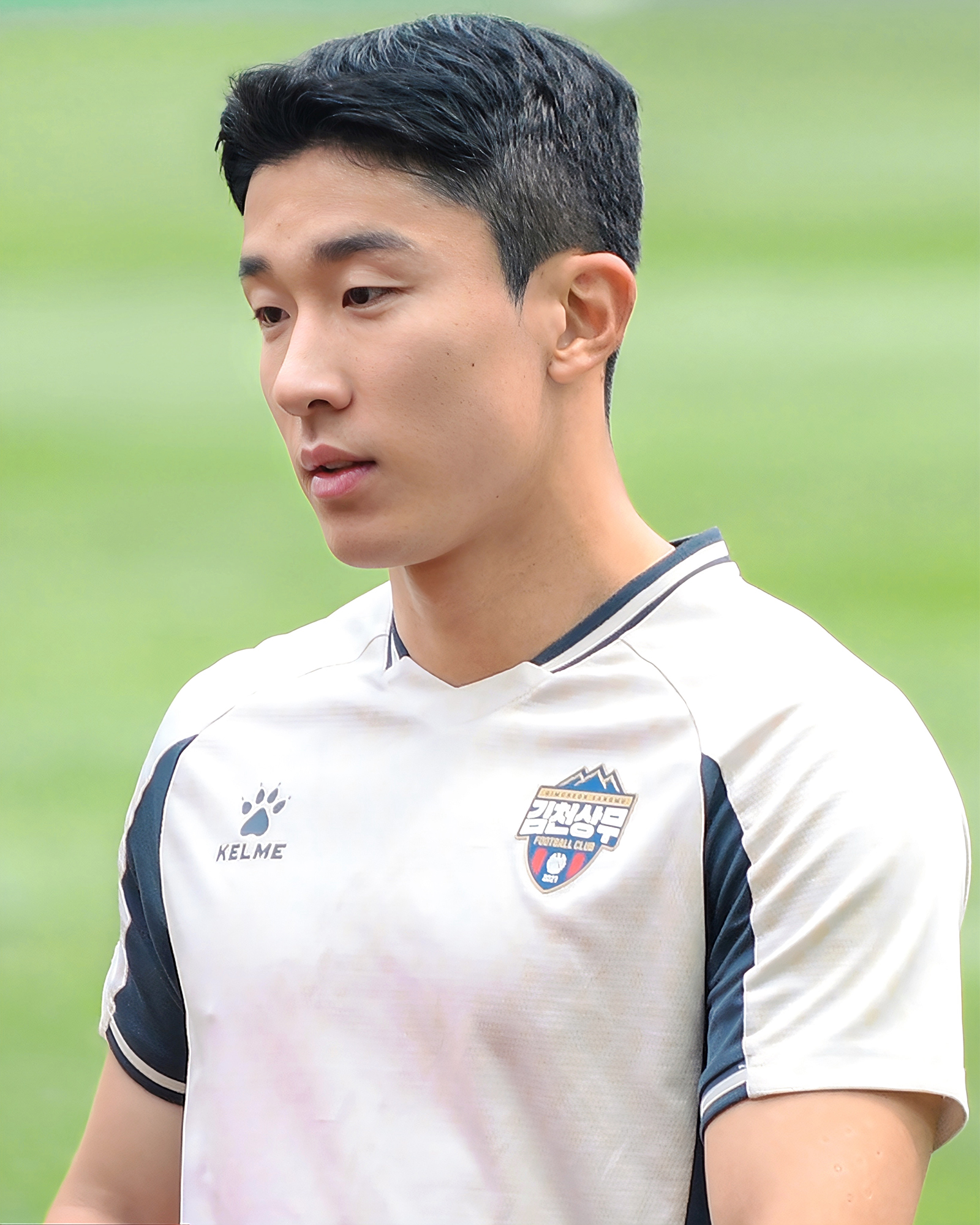
- Go in 2026

Personal information
- Date of birth: 5 March 1999 (age 27)
- Place of birth: Daegu, South Korea
- Height: 1.80 m (5 ft 11 in)
- Position: Forward

Team information
- Current team: Gimcheon Sangmu
- Number: 7

Youth career
- 2015–2017: Daeryun High School

Senior career*
Years	Team	Apps	(Gls)
2018–	Daegu FC	123	(23)
2020–2021	→ Seoul E-Land (loan)	44	(4)
2022	Daegu FC B	2	(0)
2025–	→ Gimcheon Sangmu (draft)	40	(7)

International career^{‡}
2017–2019	South Korea U20	22	(1)
2021–2023	South Korea U23	7	(2)
Medal record
Men's football
Representing South Korea
FIFA U-20 World Cup
Runner-up	2019 Poland
- * Club domestic league appearances and goals as of 13 September 2026 ‡ National team caps and goals as of 19 June 2023

Go Jae-hyun (Korean: 고재현; born 5 March 1999) is a South Korean football forward who plays for Gimcheon Sangmu and the South Korea national football team.

== Career statistics ==
As of 13 September 2026

Appearances and goals by club, season and competition
Club	Season	League			Cup		Continental		Other		Total	
Club	Season	Division	Apps	Goals	Apps	Goals	Apps	Goals	Apps	Goals	Apps	Goals
Daegu FC	2018	K League 1	12	0	1	0	—		—		13	0
Daegu FC	2019	K League 1	3	0	1	0	—		—		4	0
Daegu FC	2020	K League 1	1	0	0	0	—		—		1	0
Daegu FC	2022	K League 1	32	13	3	1	2 (Note: Appearances in AFC Champions League Elite)	0	—		37	14
Daegu FC	2023	K League 1	37	9	2	0	—		—		39	9
Daegu FC	2024	K League 1	33	1	1	0	—		2 (Note: Appearance in K League promotion-relegation play-offs)	1	36	2
Daegu FC	2025	K League 1	5	0	0	0	—		—		5	0
Daegu FC	Total		123	23	8	1	2	0	2	1	135	25
Seoul E-Land (loan)	2020	K League 2	19	2	0	0	—		—		19	2
Seoul E-Land (loan)	2021	K League 2	25	2	3	1	—		—		28	3
Seoul E-Land (loan)	Total		44	4	3	1	—		—		47	5
Daegu FC B	2022	K4 League	2	0	—		—		—		2	0
Gimcheon Sangmu (draft)	2025	K League 1	12	0	0	0	—		—		12	0
Gimcheon Sangmu (draft)	2026	K League 1	28	7	0	0	—		—		28	7
Gimcheon Sangmu (draft)	Total		40	7	0	0	—		—		40	7
Career total			209	34	11	2	2	0	2	1	224	37

== Honours ==
=== Domestic ===
Daegu FC

- Korean FA Cup: 2018

=== International ===
South Korea U20

- FIFA U-20 World Cup runner-up: 2019
