= Sérgio Costa =

Portuguese football manager (born 1973)

- Costa in 2026

Personal information
- Full name: Sérgio e Castro Costa
- Date of birth: 18 November 1973 (age 52)
- Place of birth: Portugal
- Height: 1.78 m (5 ft 10 in)

Team information
- Current team: Jeju SK (manager)

Managerial career
- Years: Team
- 2006–2007: Sporting (youth)
- 2007–2009: Sporting (analyst)
- 2010–2014: Portugal (analyst)
- 2016: Cruzeiro (assistant)
- 2016–2017: Olympiacos (assistant)
- 2017–2018: Chongqing Liangjiang Athletic (assistant)
- 2018–2022: South Korea (assistant)
- 2023–2025: United Arab Emirates (assistant)
- 2025–: Jeju SK

Sérgio e Castro Costa (born 18 November 1973) is a Portuguese professional football manager who manages Jeju SK.

== Career ==
During the summer of 2006, Costa was appointed as a youth manager of Portuguese side Sporting. Four years later, he was appointed as an analyst of the Portugal national football team. Following his stint there, he was appointed as an assistant manager of Brazilian side Cruzeiro in 2016. The same year, he was appointed as an assistant manager of Greek side Olympiacos.

Ahead of the 2018 season, he was appointed as an assistant manager of Chinese side Chongqing Liangjiang Athletic. Six months later, he was appointed as an assistant manager of the South Korea national football team, where he was assistant manager of the team at the 2022 FIFA World Cup. Subsequently, he was appointed as an assistant manager of the United Arab Emirates national football team in 2023. Eighteen months later, he was appointed manager of South Korean side Jeju SK.

== Management style ==
Costa has preferred the 4–4–2 formation. South Korean news website OhmyNews wrote in 2026 that he "prioritizes rapid transitions between offense and defense based on intricate build-up patterns from the back, and prefers to emphasize active movement among his players".
