= Seo Jin-su =

Korean association football player

- Seo in 2026

Personal information
- Date of birth: 18 October 2000 (age 26)
- Place of birth: South Korea
- Height: 1.83 m (6 ft 0 in)
- Position: Forward

Team information
- Current team: Daejeon Hana Citizen
- Number: 19

Senior career*
Years	Team	Apps	(Gls)
2019	Jeju United	16	(0)
2021–2022	→ Gimcheon Sangmu (army)	36	(3)
2022–2025	Jeju United	88	(13)
2025–	Daejeon Hana Citizen	33	(6)
- * Club domestic league appearances and goals as of 3 August 2026

- Seo Jin-su
- Hangul: 서진수
- RR: Seo Jinsu
- MR: Sŏ Chinsu

Seo Jin-su (Korean: 서진수; born 18 October 2000) is a South Korean footballer currently playing as a forward for Daejeon Hana Citizen.

== Career statistics ==
=== Club ===
As of 27 May 2023.

Club	Season	League			Cup		Other		Total	
Club	Season	Division	Apps	Goals	Apps	Goals	Apps	Goals	Apps	Goals
Jeju United	2019	K League 1	11	0	1 (Note: Appearances in the Korean FA Cup)	0	0	0	12	0
Jeju United	2020	K League 2	5	0	1	0	0	0	6	0
Gimcheon Sangmu (army)	2021	K League 2	19	2	3	2	0	0	22	4
Gimcheon Sangmu (army)	2022	K League 1	17	1	2	0	0	0	19	1
Jeju United	2022	K League 1	8	4	0	0	0	0	8	4
Jeju United	2023	K League 1	13	5	2	0	0	0	15	5
Career total			73	12	9	2	0	0	82	14
