= Lee Dong-ryul =

Korean association football player

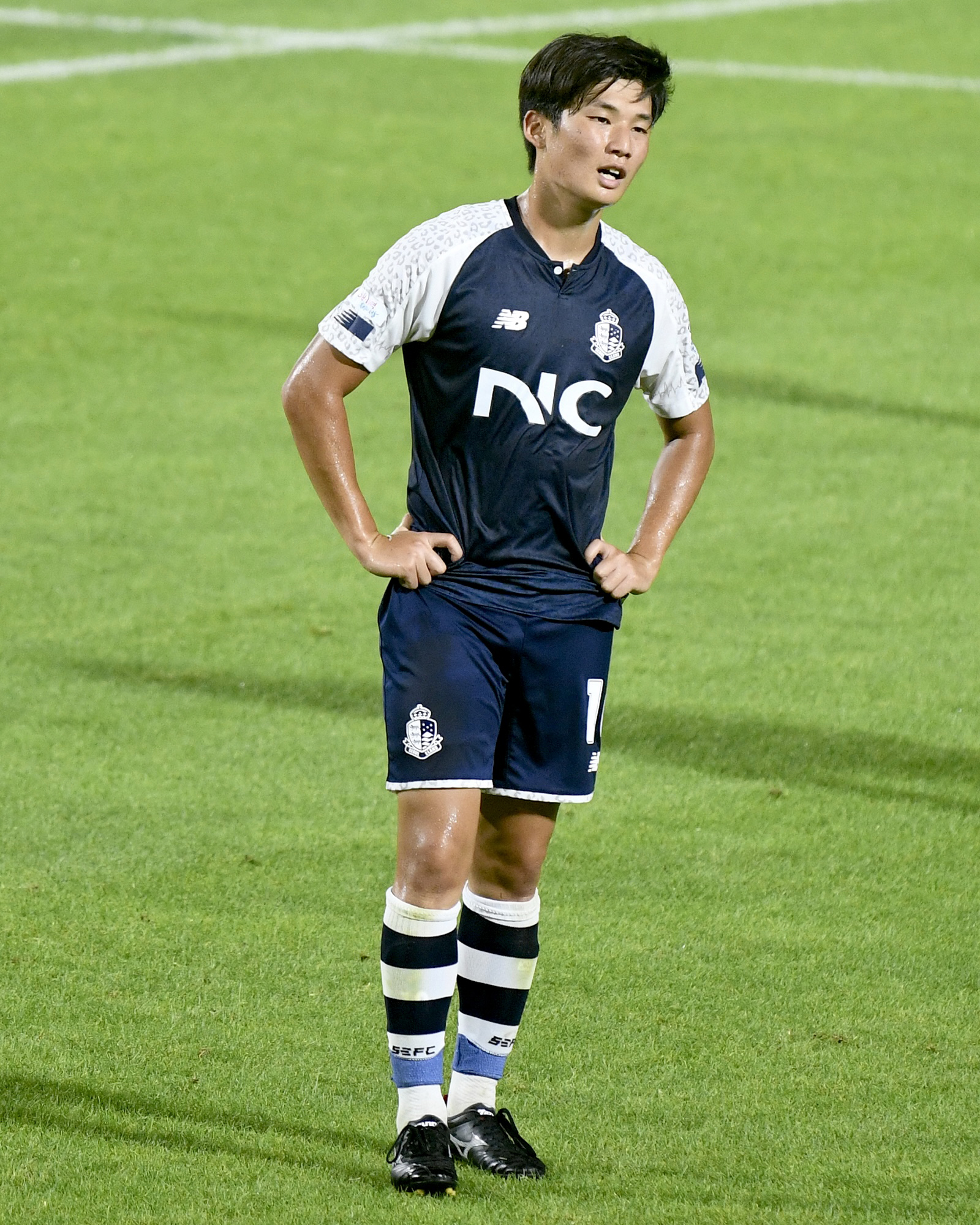
- Lee in 2023

Personal information
- Date of birth: 9 June 2000 (age 26)
- Place of birth: South Korea
- Height: 1.77 m (5 ft 10 in)
- Position: Forward

Team information
- Current team: Incheon United
- Number: 10

Senior career*
Years	Team	Apps	(Gls)
2019–2021	Jeju United	38	(5)
2022–2024	Seoul E-Land	81	(12)
2025–	Incheon United	29	(5)

International career
2015	South Korea U17	2	(0)
- * Club domestic league appearances and goals as of 3 August 2026

- Lee Dong-ryul
- Hangul: 이동률
- RR: I Dongryul
- MR: I Tongnyul

Lee Dong-ryul (Korean: 이동률; born 9 June 2000) is a South Korean footballer currently playing as a forward for Incheon United.

== Career statistics ==
=== Club ===
As of 6 March 2023.

Club	Season	League			Cup		Other		Total	
Club	Season	Division	Apps	Goals	Apps	Goals	Apps	Goals	Apps	Goals
Jeju United	2019	K League 1	5	0	1 (Note: Appearances in the Korean FA Cup)	0	0	0	6	0
Jeju United	2020	K League 2	14	5	0	0	0	0	14	5
Jeju United	2021	K League 1	19	0	0	0	0	0	19	0
Seoul E-Land	2022	K League 2	34	6	0	0	0	0	34	6
Seoul E-Land	2023	K League 2	2	0	0	0	0	0	2	0
Career total			45	6	1	0	0	0	46	6

== Honours ==
LJeju United

- K League 2: 2020

Individual

- K League Young Player of the Year (K League 2): 2020
