= Kim Hyung-geun =

South Korean footballer

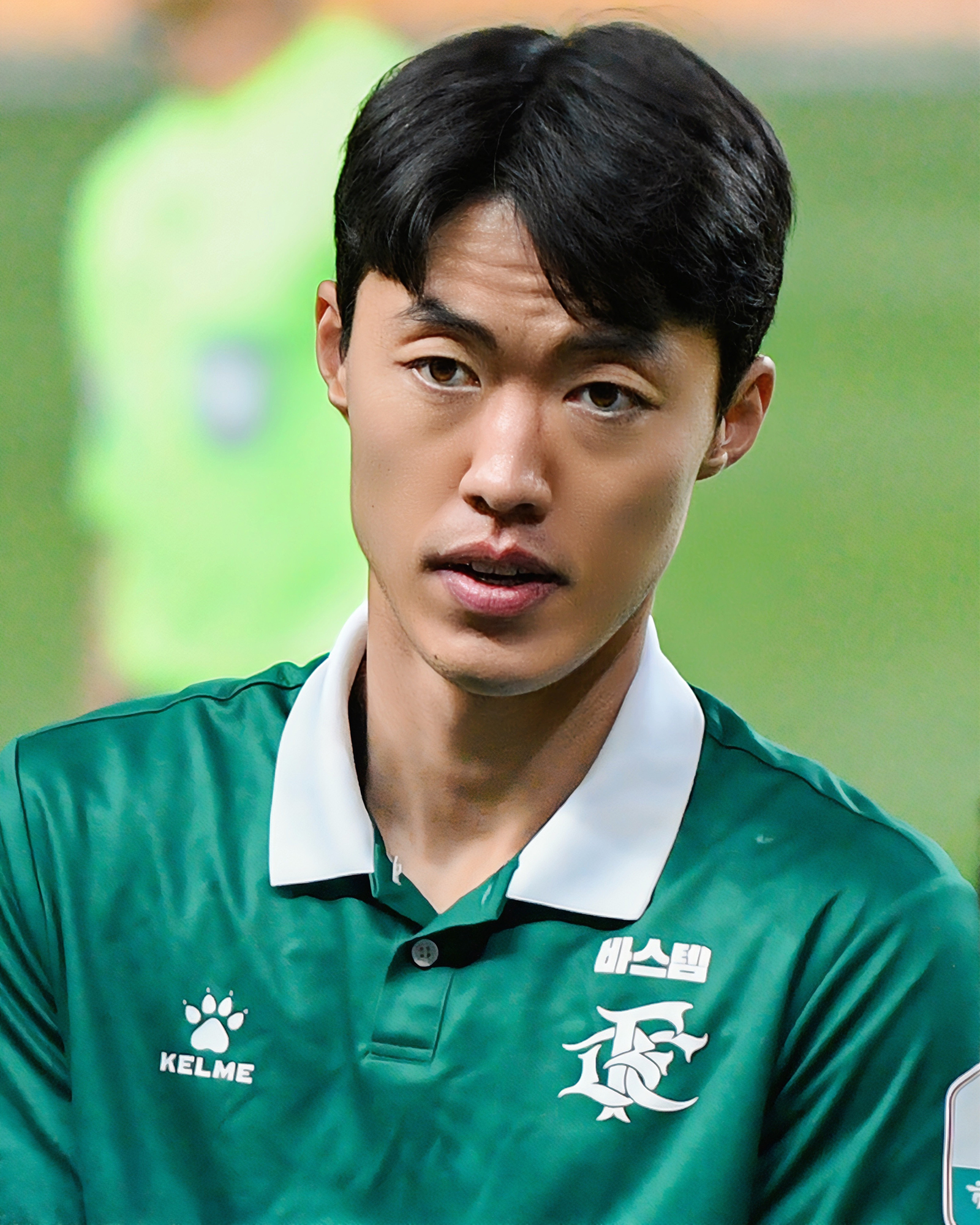
- Kim in 2026

Personal information
- Date of birth: 6 January 1994 (age 32)
- Place of birth: South Korea
- Height: 1.88 m (6 ft 2 in)
- Position: Goalkeeper

Team information
- Current team: Bucheon FC 1995

Senior career*
Years	Team	Apps	(Gls)
2016–2019	Busan IPark	46	(0)
2020–2022	Seoul E-Land FC	25	(0)
2023	Jeju United FC	1	(0)
2024–	Bucheon FC 1995	87	(0)

International career
2015	South Korea U-23	1	(0)
Korean name
Hangul	김형근
RR	Gim Hyeonggeun
MR	Kim Hyŏnggŭn
- * Club domestic league appearances and goals as of 4 August 2026

Kim Hyung-geun (Korean: 김형근; born 6 January 1994) is a South Korean footballer who plays as a goalkeeper for Bucheon FC 1995.

== Career ==
Kim joined Busan IPark on 30 December 2015. He made his debut for the club in an FA Cup victory over Gyeongnam on 27 April 2016. His first league start came in a 1-1 draw with Bucheon on 21 May.

== Club career statistics ==
As of 6 November 2024

Club performance			League		Cup		Play-offs		Total	
Season	Club	League	Apps	Goals	Apps	Goals	Apps	Goals	Apps	Goals
2016	Busan IPark	K League 2	6	0	2	0	0	0	8	0
2017	Busan IPark	K League 2	10	0	3	0	1	0	14	0
2018	Busan IPark	K League 2	14	0	0	0	0	0	14	0
2019	Busan IPark	K League 2	16	0	0	0	0	0	16	0
2020	Seoul E-Land FC	K League 2	18	0	0	0	0	0	18	0
2021	Seoul E-Land FC	K League 2	2	0	0	0	0	0	2	0
2022	Seoul E-Land FC	K League 2	5	0	1	0	0	0	6	0
2023	Jeju United FC	K League 1	1	0	1	0	0	0	2	0
2024	Bucheon FC 1995	K League 2	33	0	1	0	0	0	34	0
Career total			105	0	8	0	1	0	114	0
