= Choi Geon-ju =

South Korean footballer (born 1999)

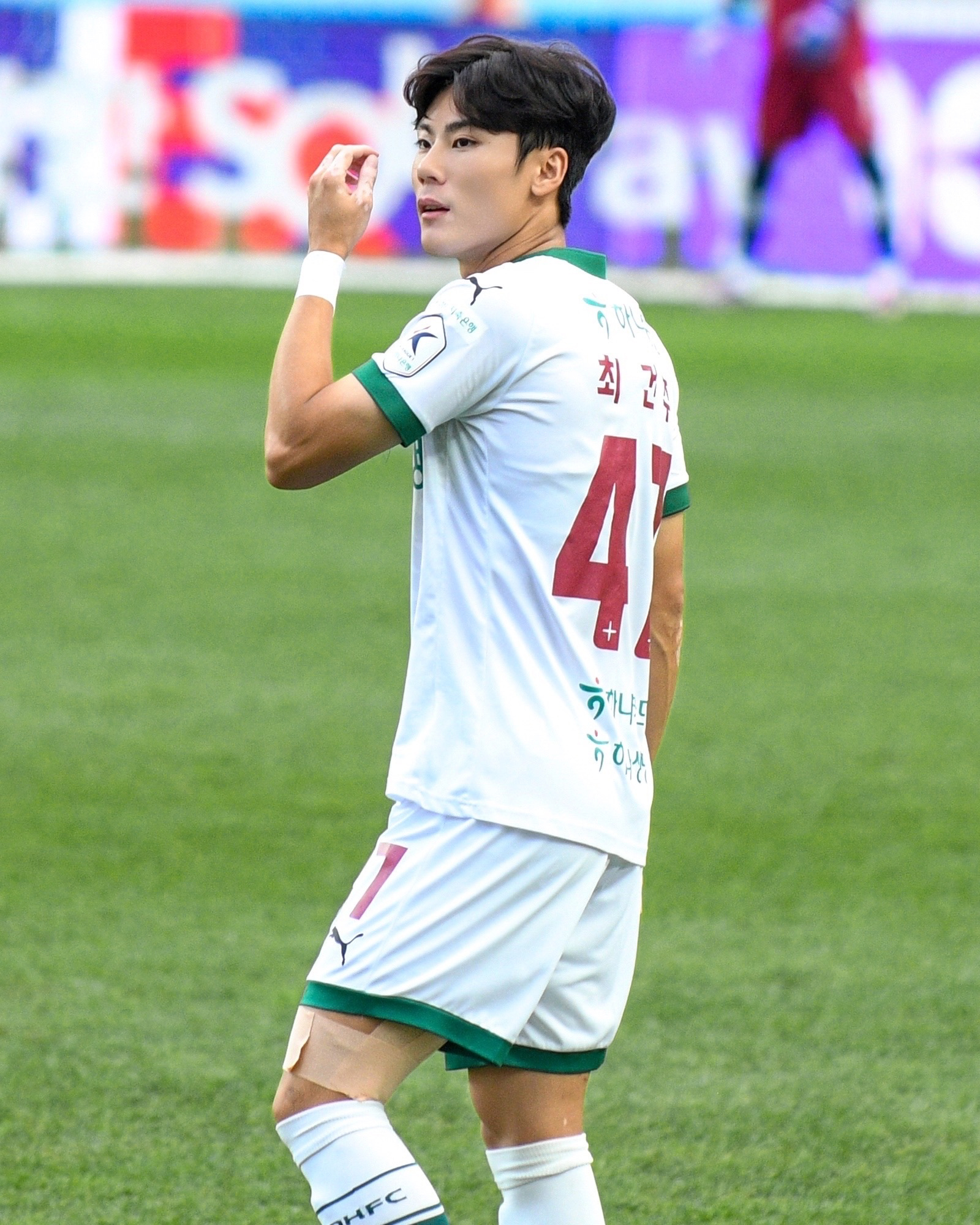
- Choi in 2024

Personal information
- Date of birth: June 26, 1999 (age 27)
- Place of birth: South Korea
- Height: 1.75 m (5 ft 9 in)
- Position: Forward

Team information
- Current team: FC Anyang
- Number: 27

Youth career
- 2016–2017: Jeonju Technical High School
- 2018–2019: Konkuk University

Senior career*
Years	Team	Apps	(Gls)
2020–2022	Ansan Greeners	84	(13)
2023–2024	Busan IPark	45	(2)
2024–2025	Daejeon Hana Citizen	30	(5)
2026–	FC Anyang	20	(5)

International career^{‡}
2021–	South Korea U23	0	(0)
Korean name
Hangul	최건주
Hanja	崔建柱
RR	Choe Geonju
MR	Ch'oe Kŏnju
- * Club domestic league appearances and goals as of 3 August 2026 ‡ National team caps and goals as of 5 October 2021

Choi Geon-ju (Korean: 최건주; born June 26, 1999) is a South Korean professional football forward currently playing for the FC Anyang of the K League 1.

== Career statistics ==
=== Club ===
As of 20 February 2022.

Club	Season	League			Cup		Other		Total	
Club	Season	Division	Apps	Goals	Apps	Goals	Apps	Goals	Apps	Goals
Ansan Greeners	2020	K League 2	20	3	0	0	—		20	3
Ansan Greeners	2021	K League 2	25	3	1	0	—		26	3
Ansan Greeners	2022	K League 2	1	1	0	0	—		1	1
Ansan Greeners	Total		46	7	1	0	—		47	7
Career total			46	7	1	0	0	0	47	7
