= Emerson Negueba =

Brazilian footballer (born 2000)

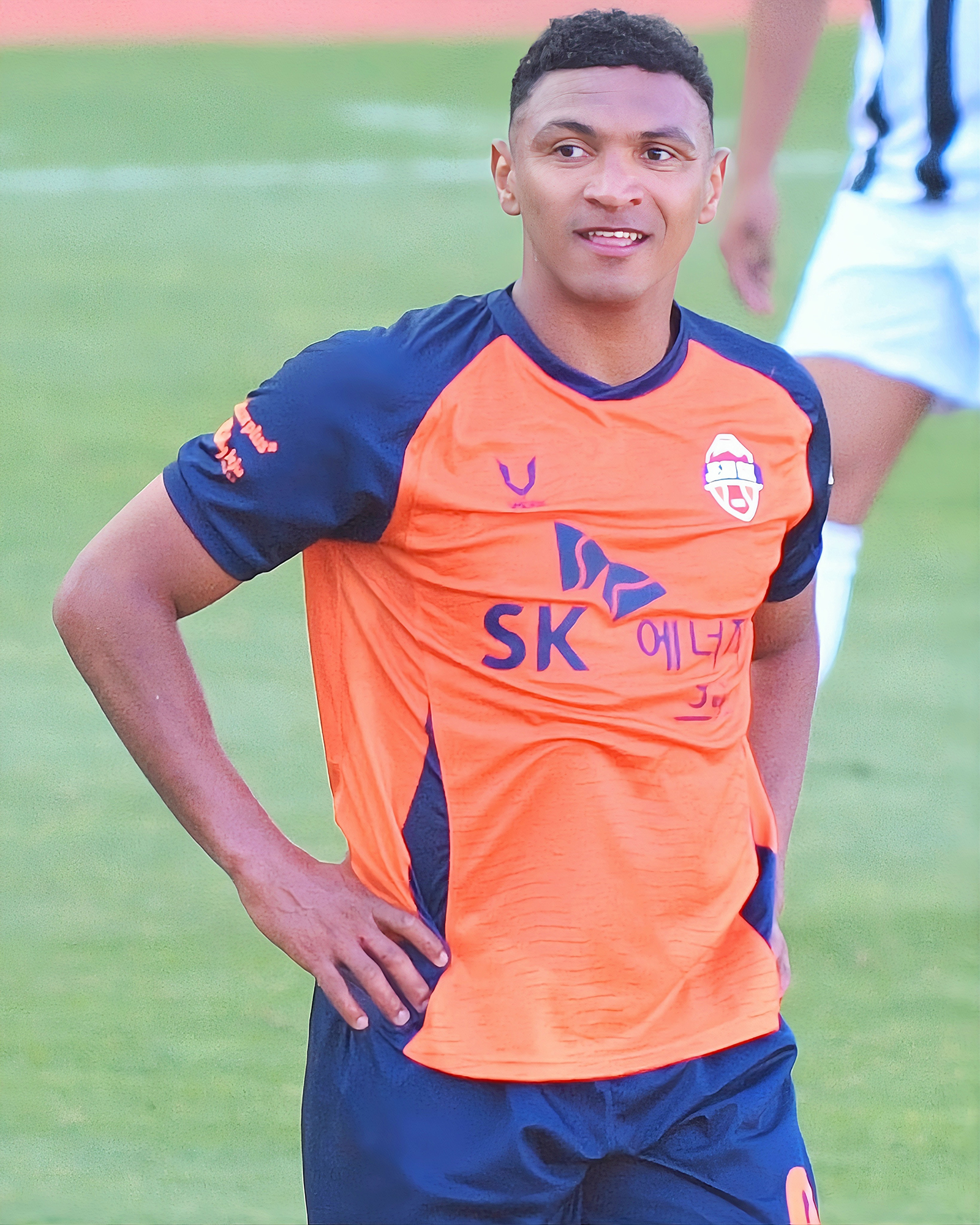
- Emerson Negueba in 2026

Personal information
- Full name: Emerson Ramon Bezerra Oliviera
- Date of birth: 24 November 2000 (age 25)
- Place of birth: Boqueirão, Brazil
- Height: 1.75 m (5 ft 9 in)
- Position: Forward

Team information
- Current team: Jeju SK
- Number: 94

Youth career
- CSA
- Santa Cruz
- Campinense
- Queimadense
- 2019: CSP

Senior career*
Years	Team	Apps	(Gls)
2019	Queimadense	5	(0)
2020–2021	CSP	6	(0)
2021	→ Treze (loan)	0	(0)
2021	→ CRB (loan)	17	(3)
2022–2023	CRB	36	(5)
2023–2025	Cuiabá	12	(0)
2024	→ Botafogo-SP (loan)	47	(1)
2025	→ Avaí (loan)	29	(4)
2026–	Jeju SK	19	(2)
- * Club domestic league appearances and goals as of 3 August 2026

Emerson Ramon Bezerra Oliviera (born 24 November 2000), known as Emerson Ramon, Emerson Negueba or just Negueba, is a Brazilian footballer who plays as a forward for Jeju SK.

== Club career ==
=== Early career ===
Born in Boqueirão, Paraíba, Negueba began his career with Queimadense, making his first team debut in the 2019 Campeonato Paraibano Segunda Divisão. Later in the year, he moved to CSP and was initially assigned to the under-20 team.

Promoted to the first team of CSP for the 2020 season, Negueba featured rarely, and was loaned to Treze in January 2021. However, he only featured in one Copa do Brasil match before leaving in June.

=== CRB ===
After leaving Treze, Negueba signed for CRB and was initially assigned to the under-23 team. He made his first team debut on 22 July, coming on as a late substitute for Erik in a 1–1 Série B away draw against Coritiba.

Negueba scored his first professional goal on 25 July 2021, netting the opener in a 3–2 win at Sampaio Corrêa. On 23 December, he signed a permanent deal with the club until 2025.

=== Cuiabá ===
On 30 March 2023, Negueba signed a four-year contract with Série A side Cuiabá.

== Career statistics ==
As of 13 February 2024

Club	Season	League			State League		Cup		Continental		Other		Total	
Club	Season	Division	Apps	Goals	Apps	Goals	Apps	Goals	Apps	Goals	Apps	Goals	Apps	Goals
Queimadense	2019	Paraibano 2ª Divisão	—		5	0	—		—		—		5	0
CSP	2020	Paraibano	—		6	0	—		—		—		6	0
Treze	2021	Série D	0	0	0	0	1	0	—		0	0	1	0
CRB	2021	Série B	17	3	—		—		—		3 (Note: Appearance(s) in Copa do Nordeste)	2	20	5
CRB	2022	Série B	28	5	5	0	1	0	—		6	0	40	5
CRB	2023	Série B	0	0	3	0	2	0	—		2	0	7	0
CRB	Total		45	8	8	0	3	0	—		11	2	67	10
Cuiabá	2023	Série A	10	0	—		—		—		—		10	0
Botafogo-SP (loan)	2024	Série B	0	0	7	0	—		—		—		7	0
Career total			55	8	26	0	4	0	0	0	11	2	96	10

== Honours ==
CRB

- Campeonato Alagoano: 2022
