= Breno Herculano =

Brazilian footballer

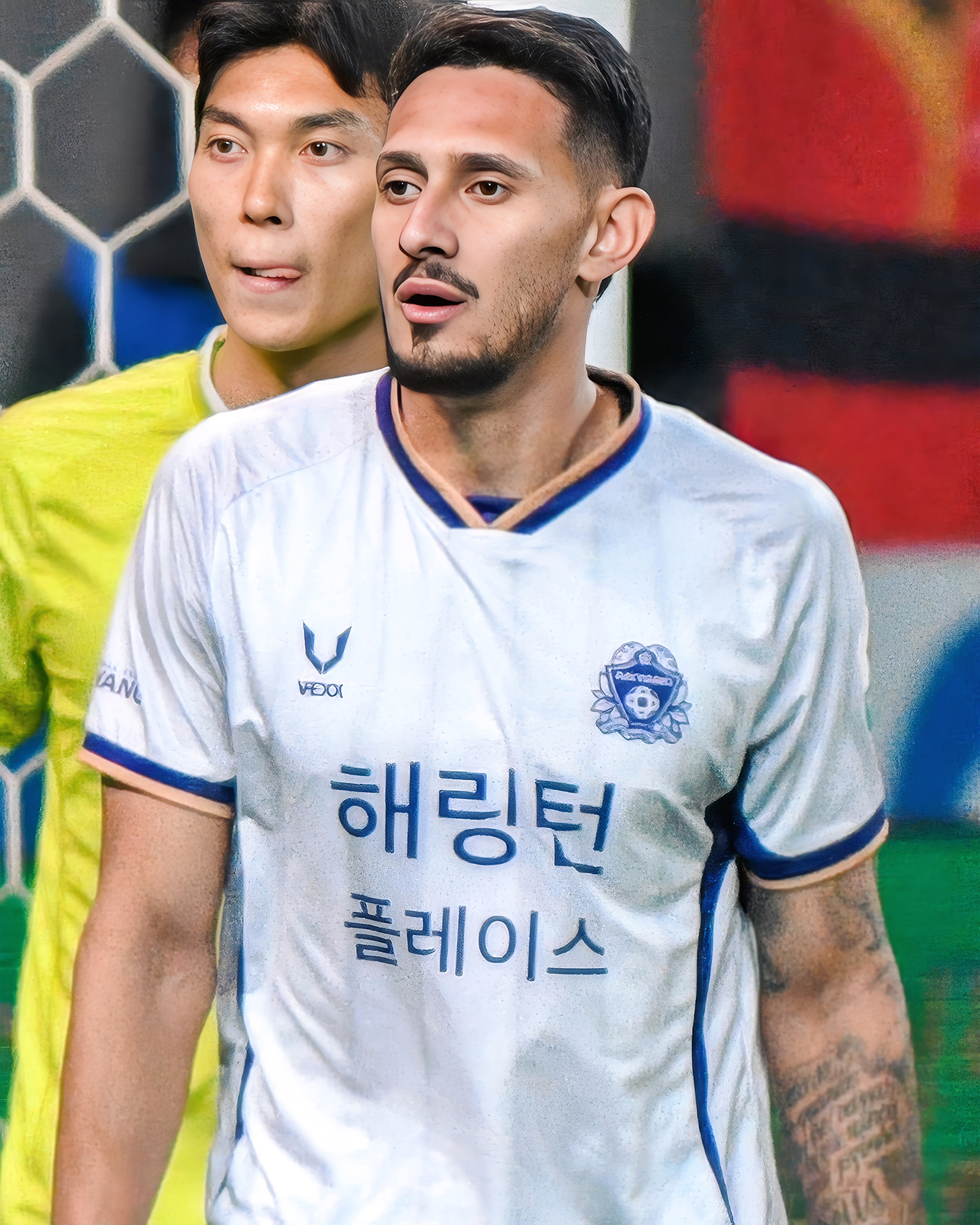
- Herculano in 2026

Personal information
- Full name: Breno Herculano Almeida
- Date of birth: 16 February 1999 (age 27)
- Place of birth: Cachoeiro de Itapemirim, Brazil
- Height: 1.89 m (6 ft 2 in)
- Position: Forward

Team information
- Current team: FC Anyang
- Number: 9

Youth career
- 2017: Boavista
- 2017: Resende
- 2018: Rio Branco-ES
- 2018: Flamengo
- 2018: Vasco da Gama
- 2019: Uberlândia

Senior career*
Years	Team	Apps	(Gls)
2020	America-RJ	8	(2)
2020	Moura	7	(0)
2021	Real Noroeste	14	(3)
2021–2022	Marcílio Dias	9	(1)
2022	Aimoré	15	(1)
2022–2025	Goiás	47	(10)
2025–	CRB	28	(6)
2026–	→ FC Anyang (loan)	17	(2)
- * Club domestic league appearances and goals as of 3 August 2026

Breno Herculano Almeida (born 16 February 1999), known as Breno Herculano or just Breno, is a Brazilian footballer who plays as a forward for FC Anyang (loan from CRB).

== Career ==
Born in Cachoeiro de Itapemirim, Espírito Santo, Breno impressed during the 2018 Copa São Paulo de Futebol Júnior while playing for Rio Branco-ES. Known as Orelha at the time, he joined Flamengo in February of that year, but was released in July.

In November 2019, after stints in the youth sides of Vasco da Gama and Uberlândia, Breno was announced at America-RJ for the upcoming season. After making his senior debut in the 2020 Campeonato Carioca, he moved abroad and signed for Campeonato de Portugal side Moura.

Breno started the 2021 campaign at Real Noroeste, but moved to Marcílio Dias on 18 August of that year. He renewed his contract on 10 December, but left the club on 22 March 2022 to join Aimoré.

On 3 August 2022, Breno agreed to a three-year contract with Série A side Goiás. The following 27 January, he suffered a knee injury, being sidelined for 10 months.

Back to action in October 2023, Breno made his top tier debut on 27 November, coming on as a second-half substitute for Vinícius in a 1–0 home loss to Cruzeiro.

== Career statistics ==
As of 28 November 2023

Club	Season	League			State League		Cup		Continental		Other		Total	
Club	Season	Division	Apps	Goals	Apps	Goals	Apps	Goals	Apps	Goals	Apps	Goals	Apps	Goals
America-RJ	2020	Carioca	—		8	2	—		—		—		8	2
Moura	2020–21	Campeonato de Portugal	7	0	—		—		—		—		7	0
Real Noroeste	2021	Capixaba	—		14	3	—		—		—		14	3
Marcílio Dias	2021	Série D	2	1	—		—		—		1 (Note: Appearance(s) in Copa Santa Catarina)	0	3	1
Marcílio Dias	2022	Série D	0	0	7	0	—		—		—		7	0
Marcílio Dias	Total		2	1	7	0	—		—		1	0	10	1
Aimoré	2022	Série D	15	1	—		—		—		—		15	1
Goiás (loan)	2022	Série A	0	0	—		—		—		1 (Note: Appearance(s) in Copa Verde)	2	1	2
Goiás (loan)	2023	Série A	1	0	3	1	0	0	0	0	—		4	1
Goiás (loan)	Total		1	0	3	1	0	0	0	0	1	2	5	3
Career total			25	2	32	6	0	0	0	0	2	2	59	10

== Honours ==
Real Noroeste

- Campeonato Capixaba: 2021
