= 2025 K League 1 =

Football season in South Korea

Hana Bank K League 1
- Season: 2025
- Dates: 15 February – 30 November
- Country: South Korea
- Teams: 12
- Champions: Jeonbuk Hyundai Motors (10th title)
- Relegated: Suwon FC; Daegu FC
- Champions League Elite: Jeonbuk Hyundai Motors; Daejeon Hana Citizen; Pohang Steelers; Gangwon FC
- Champions League Two: FC Seoul
- Matches: 228
- Goals: 578 (2.54 per match)
- Best player: Lee Dong-gyeong
- Top goalscorer: Pablo Sabbag (17 goals)
- Biggest home win: Anyang 4–0 Daegu (22 July); Gimcheon 6–2 Seoul (17 August)
- Biggest away win: Gangwon 0–4 Gimcheon (11 May 2025)
- Highest scoring: Gimcheon 6–2 Seoul (17 August)
- Longest winning run: 6 matches Jeonbuk Hyundai Motors
- Longest unbeaten run: 24 matches Jeonbuk Hyundai Motors
- Longest winless run: 12 matches Daegu FC
- Longest losing run: 7 matches Daegu FC
- Highest attendance: 48,008; Seoul 0–1 Jeonbuk (3 May)
- Lowest attendance: 1,405; Gimcheon 0–1 Gangwon (8 November)
- Total attendance: 2,298,557
- Average attendance: 10,081

The 2025 K League 1, also known as the Hana Bank K League 1 for sponsorship reasons, was the 43rd season of the top division of professional football in South Korea, and the twelfth season of the K League 1. Ulsan HD were the three-time defending champions.

== Rule changes ==
The following rules were newly introduced for the 2025 season.

1. Concussion substitution rule
2. Homegrown foreign player rule for players of foreign nationality who have spent a significant period of their youth career in South Korea
3. Domestic foreign player rule for players of foreign nationality who have been registered with a domestic amateur team for at least three consecutive years or a total of five years before their first professional contract
4. Introduction of a one-off Special Player Registration Period 1–10 June 2025
5. Increase in the number of players a club can loan in or out (from five to six), and in the number of players that can be loaned between two clubs (from one to two)

== Teams ==
=== Team changes ===
FC Anyang were promoted from the K League 2 for the first time in the club's history. Incheon United were relegated to the K League 2, absenting from the top flight of South Korean football for the first time in the club's history.

▲ Promoted from K League 2	▼ Relegated to K League 2
FC Anyang	Incheon United

=== Locations ===
The following twelve clubs are competing in the 2025 K League 1.

Team	City/Province	Abbreviation
Daegu FC	Daegu	Daegu
Daejeon Hana Citizen	Daejeon	Daejeon
FC Anyang	Anyang	Anyang
Gangwon FC	Gangwon	Gangwon
Gimcheon Sangmu	Gimcheon	Gimcheon
Gwangju FC	Gwangju	Gwangju
Jeju SK	Jeju	Jeju
Jeonbuk Hyundai Motors	Jeonbuk	Jeonbuk
Pohang Steelers	Pohang	Pohang
FC Seoul	Seoul	Seoul
Suwon FC	Suwon	Suwon FC
Ulsan HD	Ulsan	Ulsan

Locations of the 2025 K League 1 teams	Locations of the 2025 K League 1 teams in the Seoul Capital Area

=== Stadiums ===
Daegu FC	Daejeon Hana Citizen	Gangwon FC	
DGB Daegu Bank Park	Daejeon World Cup Stadium	Chuncheon Songam Sports Town	Gangneung Stadium
Capacity: **12,415**	Capacity: **40,903**	Capacity: **20,000**	Capacity: **22,333**
FC Anyang	Gimcheon Sangmu	Gwangju FC	Jeju SK
Anyang Stadium	Gimcheon Stadium	Gwangju World Cup Stadium	Jeju World Cup Stadium
Capacity: **17,143**	Capacity: **25,000**	Capacity: **40,245**	Capacity: **29,791**
Jeonbuk Hyundai Motors	Pohang Steelers	FC Seoul	Suwon FC
Jeonju World Cup Stadium	Pohang Steel Yard	Seoul World Cup Stadium	Suwon Stadium
Capacity: **42,477**	Capacity: **17,443**	Capacity: **66,704**	Capacity: **11,808**
Ulsan HD			
Ulsan Munsu Football Stadium			
Capacity: **44,102**			

=== Personnel and sponsoring ===
Team	Manager	Kit manufacturer	Main sponsor	Other sponsor(s)
FC Anyang	(South Korea) Ryu Byeong-hoon	V-EXX	Osang Healthcare	List: Front: All Ways Incheon, Ddangyo, Shinhan Bank; Back: None; Sleeves: 2025 APEC Incheon, Incheon; Shorts: None
Daegu FC	(South Korea) Kim Byung-soo	Goal Studio	iM Bank	List: Front: None; Back: Daegu Haany University, Daeguro; Sleeves: Powerful Daegu; Shorts: None
Daejeon Hana Citizen	(South Korea) Hwang Sun-hong	Puma	Hana Bank	List: Front: Hana Capital; Back: Hana Securities, Hana Card, Hana Life; Sleeves: Hana Savings Bank, CNCITY Energy, Gyeryong Construction, Hana Insurance, Daejeon First-Class Economic City; Shorts: None
Gangwon FC	(South Korea) Chung Kyung-ho	Fila	High1 Resort	List: Front: None; Back: Gangwon Hanwoo; Sleeves: Kangwon Land, Gangwon State; Shorts: None
Gimcheon Sangmu	(South Korea) Chung Jung-yong	Kelme	Happy Gimcheon	List: Front: Nonghyup Bank; Back: Neo Tech, DGB Financial Group, North Gyeongsang Province; Sleeves: Aju Steel, Shine Muscat, Gimcheon; Shorts: None
Gwangju FC	(South Korea) Lee Jung-hyo	Goal Studio	Kwangju Bank	List: Front: None; Back: None; Sleeves: Parangsae Eye Clinic, Gwangju City; Shorts: Namhai Honnête
Jeju SK	(South Korea) Kim Jung-soo (caretaker)	Fila	SK Energy	List: Front: Jeju, SK Muffin; Back: Jeju Samdasoo; Sleeves: EnClean Solux Plus+, Only Jeju; Shorts: None
Jeonbuk Hyundai Motors	(Uruguay) Gus Poyet	Adidas	Hyundai N	List: Front: Hyundai Motors; Back: Hyundai N, Hyundai Motors/Kumho Tire; Sleeves: Jeonbuk State, Hyundai Ioniq 5 N/Hyundai Avante N; Shorts: None
Pohang Steelers	(South Korea) Park Tae-ha	Puma	POSCO	List: Front: Pohang, POSCO (away); Back: Lashevan, POSCO E&C; Sleeves: Pohang; Shorts: None
FC Seoul	(South Korea) Kim Gi-dong	Pro-Specs	Xi (home); GS Caltex (away)	List: Front: TMON; Back: Shinhan SOL Pay, GS Caltex; Sleeves: KEF, Seoul My Soul, GS25; Shorts: None
Suwon FC	(South Korea) Kim Eun-jung	Hummel	Suwon Special City	List: Front: None; Back: Industrial Bank of Korea; Sleeves: Kiko Luggage, Suwon Special City; Shorts: None
Ulsan HD	(South Korea) Roh Sang-rae (caretaker)	Adidas	HD Hyundai	List: Front: Ulsan, the city of dreams, Ulsan, the corporate city; Back: HD Hyundai Oilbank Kazen; Sleeves: BNK Kyongnam Bank, Develon, Ulsan; Shorts: None

=== Managerial changes ===
Team	Outgoing manager	Manner of departure	Date of vacancy	Table	Replaced by	Date of appointment
Gangwon FC	(South Korea) Yoon Jong-hwan	End of contract	30 November 2024	Pre-season	(South Korea) Chung Kyung-ho	6 December 2024
Jeonbuk Hyundai Motors	(South Korea) Kim Do-heon	Mutual consent	16 December 2024	Pre-season	(Uruguay) Gus Poyet	24 December 2024
Daegu FC	(South Korea) Park Chang-hyun	Mutual consent	13 April 2025	11th	(South Korea) Kim Byung-soo	1 June 2025
Ulsan HD	(South Korea) Kim Pan-gon	Mutual consent	2 August 2025	7th	(South Korea) Shin Tae-yong	5 August 2025
Jeju SK	(South Korea) Kim Hak-bum	Resigned	29 September 2025	11th	(South Korea) Kim Jung-soo (caretaker)	30 September 2025
Ulsan HD	(South Korea) Shin Tae-yong	Sacked	9 October 2025	10th	(South Korea) Roh Sang-rae (caretaker)	9 October 2025

=== Foreign players ===
Each team may have up to six foreign players registered, but may only field up to five at any given time. As a military-owned team, Gimcheon Sangmu are not allowed to sign any foreign players.

A North Korean player is considered to be a domestic player under South Korean nationality law. As of 2025, K League has a homegrown system under which players of foreign nationality who have grown up in Korea are considered to be domestic players when registering as new players.

Players in bold were registered during the mid-season transfer window.

Team	Player 1	Player 2	Player 3	Player 4	Player 5	Player 6	Homegrown	Former (Note: Left their respective clubs during the mid-season transfer window.)
FC Anyang	(Bosnia and Herzegovina) **Ivan Jukić**	(Brazil) Bruno Mota	(Brazil) Eduardo	(Brazil) Matheus Oliveira	(Brazil) Yago César	(Netherlands) Thomas Oude Kotte		
Daegu FC	(Brazil) Bruno Lamas	(Brazil) Caio Marcelo	(Brazil) Césinha	(Brazil) Edgar	(Brazil) **Geovani**	(Brazil) **Jatobá**	(Ghana) Isaac Osei	(Japan) Kyohei Yoshino
Daejeon Hana Citizen	(Azerbaijan) Anton Kryvotsyuk	(Brazil) **Hernandes Rodrigues**	(Brazil) **João Victor**	(Brazil) Victor Bobsin	(Japan) Masatoshi Ishida			(Australia) Aaron Calver (Brazil) Kelvin (Latvia) Vladislavs Gutkovskis
Gangwon FC	(Brazil) **Bruno Oliveira**	(Brazil) Vitor Gabriel	(Montenegro) Marko Tući					(Croatia) Mario Ćuže (Croatia) Franko Kovačević (Guinea-Bissau) Romário Baldé
Gwangju FC	(Brazil) Reis	(Iceland) **Hólmbert Friðjónsson**						(Albania) Jasir Asani (Brazil) Bruno Oliveira (Brazil) Gabriel Tigrão
Jeju SK	(Brazil) Denílson	(Brazil) Evandro	(Brazil) Italo	(Brazil) **Pedrinho**	(Brazil) **Tiago Alves**	(Brazil) Yuri		
Jeonbuk Hyundai Motors	(Brazil) Tiago Orobó	(Ghana) **Patrick Twumasi**	(Italy) Andrea Compagno	(Portugal) **João Gamboa**				(Australia) Joel Anasmo (Brazil) Andrigo (Brazil) Hernandes Rodrigues (Ghana) Nana Boateng
Pohang Steelers	(Australia) Jonathan Aspropotamitis	(Brazil) Jorge Teixeira	(Brazil) Juninho Rocha	(Brazil) Oberdan	(Brazil) Wanderson			
FC Seoul	(Brazil) **Anderson Oliveira**	(Brazil) Lucas Rodrigues	(Croatia) Marko Dugandžić	(England) Jesse Lingard	(Jordan) Yazan Al-Arab	(Poland) **Patryk Klimala**	(Ivory Coast) Gbato Seloh Samuel	(Brazil) Willyan
Suwon FC	(Brazil) **Andrigo**	(Brazil) Luan Dias	(Brazil) **Willyan**	(Syria) Pablo Sabbag				(Brazil) Anderson Oliveira (France) Leroy Abanda (Norway) Mohamed Ofkir
Ulsan HD	(Brazil) Erick Farias	(Brazil) **Marcão**	(Poland) **Miłosz Trojak**	(Sweden) Darijan Bojanić	(Sweden) Gustav Ludwigson	(Venezuela) Matías Lacava		(Brazil) Yago Cariello (Georgia (country)) Giorgi Arabidze

== League table ==
Pos	Team	Pld	W	D	L	GF	GA	GD	Pts	Qualification or relegation (Note: Teams played each other three times (33 matches), before the league was split into two groups, the top six and the bottom six.)
1	Jeonbuk Hyundai Motors (C)	38	23	10	5	64	32	+32	79	Qualification for Champions League Elite league stage
2	Daejeon Hana Citizen	38	18	11	9	58	46	+12	65	Qualification for Champions League Elite league stage
3	Gimcheon Sangmu (Note: Military-owned team Gimcheon Sangmu cannot qualify for AFC competitions.)	38	18	7	13	59	45	+14	61	
4	Pohang Steelers	38	16	8	14	41	46	−5	56	Qualification for Champions League Elite league stage
5	Gangwon FC	38	13	13	12	37	41	−4	52	Qualification for Champions League Elite preliminary stage
6	FC Seoul	38	12	13	13	50	52	−2	49	Qualification for Champions League Two group stage
7	Gwangju FC	38	15	9	14	40	41	−1	54	
8	FC Anyang	38	14	7	17	49	47	+2	49	
9	Ulsan HD	38	11	11	16	42	50	−8	44	
10	Suwon FC (R)	38	11	9	18	51	58	−7	42	Qualification for relegation play-offs
11	Jeju SK (O)	38	10	9	19	40	53	−13	39	Qualification for relegation play-offs
12	Daegu FC (R)	38	7	13	18	47	67	−20	34	Relegation to K League 2

Source: Soccerway K League
Rules for classification: 1) Points; 2) Goals scored; 3) Goal difference; 4) Wins; 5) Head-to-head points
(C) Champions; (O) Play-off winners; (R) Relegated

== Positions by matchday ==
Leaders, qualification for Champions League Elite league stage
Qualification for Champions League Elite play-off round
Qualification for Champions League Two group stage
Qualification for relegation play-offs
Relegation to K League 2

=== Round 1–33 ===
Team ╲ Round	1	2	3	4	5	6	7	8	9	10	11	12	13	14	15	16	17	18	19	20	21	22	23	24	25	26	27	28	29	30	31	32	33
Jeonbuk Hyundai Motors	3	2	6	8	9	5	4	6	3	2	2	2	2	2	2	1	1	1	1	1	1	1	1	1	1	1	1	1	1	1	1	1	1
Gimcheon Sangmu	8	4	7	3	3	2	2	2	4	3	3	3	4	4	4	5	5	4	3	3	3	3	3	2	3	2	2	2	2	2	2	2	2
Daejeon Hana Citizen	1	5	2	1	1	1	1	1	1	1	1	1	1	1	1	2	2	2	2	2	2	2	2	3	2	3	4	3	3	3	3	3	3
Pohang Steelers	12	12	12	12	12	6	7	7	9	7	7	8	5	6	5	4	4	5	5	4	4	5	5	5	4	4	3	4	4	4	4	4	4
FC Seoul	11	9	9	7	4	3	3	5	6	8	9	9	9	7	8	7	7	6	7	7	6	4	4	4	5	5	5	5	7	5	5	5	5
Gangwon FC	8	6	8	5	6	10	11	8	7	9	8	6	8	8	7	8	9	10	10	8	8	8	9	8	8	8	7	7	6	7	7	6	6
FC Anyang	5	8	10	10	7	11	8	9	8	6	6	7	7	9	9	9	8	7	8	9	9	10	10	11	11	11	11	9	8	8	8	8	7
Gwangju FC	6	10	4	6	8	8	6	4	2	5	5	5	6	5	6	6	6	8	6	6	5	6	6	6	7	6	6	6	5	6	6	7	8
Ulsan HD	10	7	3	2	2	4	5	3	5	4	4	4	3	3	3	3	3	3	4	5	7	7	7	7	6	7	8	8	9	9	10	10	9
Suwon FC	6	11	11	11	11	12	12	12	12	12	12	11	12	10	10	11	11	11	11	11	11	11	11	10	10	9	9	10	10	10	9	9	10
Jeju SK	2	3	5	8	10	9	10	10	10	10	10	10	11	11	11	10	10	9	9	10	10	9	8	9	9	10	10	11	11	11	11	11	11
Daegu FC	3	1	1	4	5	7	9	11	11	11	11	12	10	12	12	12	12	12	12	12	12	12	12	12	12	12	12	12	12	12	12	12	12

Source: K League
Notes:
- Matchday 4 (8–9 March): The match between Gwangju FC and Pohang Steelers was postponed to 22 March due to Gwangju FC's schedule for the 2024–25 AFC Champions League Elite.
- Matchday 10 (26–27 April): The match between Gwangju FC and Daegu FC was held in advance on 9 April due to Gwangju FC's schedule for the 2024–25 AFC Champions League Elite.
- Matchday 18 (13–14 June): The match between Ulsan HD and Daejeon Hana Citizen was held in advance on 1 April due to Ulsan HD's schedule for the 2025 FIFA Club World Cup.
- Matchday 19 (17–18 June): The match between FC Anyang and Ulsan HD was held in advance on 23 April due to Ulsan HD's schedule for the 2025 FIFA Club World Cup.
- Matchday 20 (21–22 June): The match between Ulsan HD and Suwon FC was postponed to 2 August due to Ulsan HD's schedule for the 2025 FIFA Club World Cup.
- Matchday 21 (28–29 June): The match between Ulsan HD and Daegu FC was postponed to 12 July due to Ulsan HD's schedule for the 2025 FIFA Club World Cup.

=== Round 34–38 ===
Team ╲ Round	34	35	36	37	38
Jeonbuk Hyundai Motors	1	1	1	1	1
Daejeon Hana Citizen	3	2	2	2	2
Gimcheon Sangmu	2	3	3	3	3
Pohang Steelers	4	4	4	4	4
Gangwon FC	6	6	6	6	5
FC Seoul	5	5	5	5	6
Gwangju FC	7	7	8	7	7
FC Anyang	8	8	7	8	8
Ulsan HD	9	9	9	9	9
Suwon FC	10	10	10	10	10
Jeju SK	11	11	11	11	11
Daegu FC	12	12	12	12	12

Source: K League

== Results ==
=== Matches 1–22 ===
Teams played each other twice, once at home, once away.

Home \ Away	AYG	DGU	DHC	GWN	GCS	GJU	JSK	JHM	PHS	SEL	SWN	USH
FC Anyang	—	2–2	1–1	2–0	1–3	1–2	2–1	0–1	0–2	1–1	3–1	0–1
Daegu FC	0–1	—	1–2	2–1	2–3	1–1	3–1	0–4	1–1	0–1	3–1	0–1
Daejeon Hana Citizen	2–1	2–1	—	1–0	0–0	1–1	1–1	0–2	1–3	0–0	1–0	0–2
Gangwon FC	1–3	3–0	2–2	—	0–4	1–0	0–0	0–3	2–1	0–1	0–0	1–1
Gimcheon Sangmu	1–0	2–0	0–2	1–0	—	0–0	1–1	1–2	1–0	0–1	1–1	2–0
Gwangju FC	2–1	2–1	2–2	0–1	1–0	—	1–0	0–1	2–3	1–3	0–0	1–1
Jeju SK	2–0	2–1	1–3	0–3	2–3	0–1	—	0–0	2–0	2–0	1–0	1–2
Jeonbuk Hyundai Motors	2–0	3–1	1–1	0–1	2–1	2–2	1–1	—	2–2	1–1	3–2	3–1
Pohang Steelers	2–1	0–0	0–3	2–1	1–2	0–1	2–1	2–3	—	1–0	2–0	1–0
FC Seoul	2–1	3–2	2–2	1–1	0–0	1–2	1–3	0–1	4–1	—	1–1	1–0
Suwon FC	1–2	2–1	3–0	1–2	3–2	2–1	0–1	1–2	1–1	0–0	—	1–1
Ulsan HD	0–1	2–2	2–3	1–2	3–2	3–0	2–0	1–0	1–1	0–0	2–3	—

Source: K League
Legend: Blue = home team win; Yellow = draw; Red = away team win.

Matchday 1 (15–16 February)
15 February 2025
13:00 UTC+9

Pohang Steelers	0–3	Daejeon Hana Citizen
		32' Choi Geon-ju; 87', 90' Joo Min-kyu

Pohang Steel Yard, Pohang
Attendance: 10,519
Referee: Lee Dong-jun
15 February 2025
15:30 UTC+9

Jeju SK	2–0	FC Seoul
Kim Jun-ha 14'; Lee Kun-hee 57'

Jeju World Cup Stadium, Seogwipo, Jeju Province
Attendance: 11,049
Referee: Choi Gwang-ho
15 February 2025
16:30 UTC+9

Gwangju FC	0–0	Suwon FC

Gwangju World Cup Stadium, Gwangju
Attendance: 4,690
Referee: Park Byeong-jin
16 February 2025
14:00 UTC+9

Ulsan HD	0–1	FC Anyang
		90+1' Bruno Mota

Ulsan Munsu Football Stadium, Ulsan
Attendance: 18,718
Referee: Kim Yong-woo
16 February 2025
16:30 UTC+9

Jeonbuk Hyundai Motors	2–1	Gimcheon Sangmu
Park Jin-seob 45+6'; Jeon Jin-woo 81'		14' Yu Kang-hyun

Jeonju World Cup Stadium, Jeonju
Attendance: 19,619
Referee: Shin Yong-jun
16 February 2025
16:30 UTC+9

Daegu FC	2–1	Gangwon FC
Bruno Lamas 56'; Cesinha 90+3'		44' Vitor Gabriel

iM Bank Park, Daegu
Attendance: 12,240
Referee: Seol Tae-hwan

Matchday 2 (22–23 February)
22 February 2025
14:00 UTC+9

Jeju SK	2–3	Gimcheon Sangmu
Lee Kun-hee 30'; Yu In-soo 58'		50' Lee Dong-gyeong; 63' Park Sang-hyeok; 90' Won Ki-jong

Jeju World Cup Stadium, Seogwipo, Jeju Province
Attendance: 5,733
Referee: Kim Woo-sung
22 February 2025
16:30 UTC+9

FC Seoul	2–1	FC Anyang
Lingard 48'; Lucas 79'		90+3' Choe Seong-beom

Seoul World Cup Stadium, Seoul
Attendance: 41,415
Referee: Ko Hyung-jin
22 February 2025
16:30 UTC+9

Daegu FC	3–1	Suwon FC
Bruno Lamas 19' (pen.); Lee Yong 53' (o.g.); Caio Marcelo 70'		90+4' Anderson

iM Bank Park, Daegu
Attendance: 12,098
Referee: Kim Dae-yong
23 February 2025
14:00 UTC+9

Daejeon Hana Citizen	0–2	Ulsan HD
		8' Yoon Jae-seok; 59' Heo Yool

Daejeon World Cup Stadium, Daejeon
Attendance: 19,628
Referee: Kim Jong-hyeok
23 February 2025
16:30 UTC+9

Jeonbuk Hyundai Motors	2–2	Gwangju FC
Compagno 21', 66'		14' Asani; 63' Oh Hu-seong

Jeonju World Cup Stadium, Jeonju
Attendance: 15,393
Referee: Chae Sang-hyeop
23 February 2025
16:30 UTC+9

Gangwon FC	2–1	Pohang Steelers
Lee Ji-ho 82', 90+3'		44' Lee Ho-jae

Chuncheon Songam Sports Town, Chuncheon
Attendance: 6,539
Referee: Song Min-seok

Matchday 3 (1–3 March)
1 March 2025
14:00 UTC+9

Ulsan HD	1–0	Jeonbuk Hyundai Motors
Bojanić 65'

Ulsan Munsu Football Stadium, Ulsan
Attendance: 26,317
Referee: Kim Woo-sung
1 March 2025
16:30 UTC+9

Pohang Steelers	0–0	Daegu FC

Pohang Steel Yard, Pohang
Attendance: 11,207
Referee: Kim Yong-woo
1 March 2025
16:30 UTC+9

Gwangju FC	2–1	FC Anyang
Asani 57', 89'		16' Bruno Mota

Gwangju World Cup Stadium, Gwangju
Attendance: 3,319
Referee: Shin Yong-jun
2 March 2025
14:00 UTC+9

Daejeon Hana Citizen	1–0	Suwon FC
Joo Min-kyu 87'

Daejeon World Cup Stadium, Daejeon
Attendance: 7,220
Referee: Choi Gwang-ho
2 March 2025
16:30 UTC+9

Gangwon FC	0–0	Jeju SK

Chuncheon Songam Sports Town, Chuncheon
Attendance: 5,009
Referee: Lee Dong-jun
3 March 2025
14:00 UTC+9

FC Seoul	0–0	Gimcheon Sangmu

Seoul World Cup Stadium, Seoul
Attendance: 24,889
Referee: Seol Tae-hwan

Matchday 4 (8–9, 22 March)
8 March 2025
14:00 UTC+9

Suwon FC	0–0	FC Seoul

Suwon Sports Complex, Suwon
Attendance: 8,661
Referee: Chae Sang-hyeop
8 March 2025
16:30 UTC+9

Daegu FC	1–2	Daejeon Hana Citizen
Bruno Lamas 71'		7' Joo Min-kyu; 10' Choi Geon-ju

iM Bank Park, Daegu
Attendance: 12,168
Referee: Ko Hyung-jin
8 March 2025
16:30 UTC+9

FC Anyang	1–3	Gimcheon Sangmu
Matheus Oliveira 18'		20' Lee Dong-gyeong; 36' Kim Seung-sub; 38' Yu Kang-hyun

Anyang Stadium, Anyang
Attendance: 13,579
Referee: Kim Dae-yong
9 March 2025
14:00 UTC+9

Ulsan HD	2–0	Jeju SK
Heo Yool 32', 70'

Ulsan Munsu Football Stadium, Ulsan
Attendance: 16,749
Referee: Song Min-seok
9 March 2025
16:30 UTC+9

Jeonbuk Hyundai Motors	0–1	Gangwon FC
		89' Kim Gyeong-min

Jeonju World Cup Stadium, Jeonju
Attendance: 14,090
Referee: Kim Jong-hyeok
22 March 2025
16:30 UTC+9

Gwangju FC	2–3	Pohang Steelers
Cho Sung-gwon 7'; Reis 90+2'		22' Oberdan; 68' (pen.) Lee Ho-jae; 90+11' Kang Hyun-je

Gwangju World Cup Stadium, Gwangju
Attendance: 4,544
Referee: Park Byeong-jin

Matchday 5 (15–16 March)
15 March 2025
14:00 UTC+9

Jeju SK	1–3	Daejeon Hana Citizen
Seo Jin-su 56' (pen.)		50' Joo Min-kyu; 90+1' Jeong Jae-hee; 90+4' Lee Jun-gyu

Jeju World Cup Stadium, Seogwipo, Jeju Province
Attendance: 4,561
Referee: Seol Tae-hwan
15 March 2025
16:30 UTC+9

Gangwon FC	0–1	FC Seoul
		19' Cho Young-wook

Chuncheon Songam Sports Town, Chuncheon
Attendance: 10,231
Referee: Shin Yong-jun
15 March 2025
16:30 UTC+9

Daegu FC	0–1	FC Anyang
		20' Chae Hyun-woo

iM Bank Park, Daegu
Attendance: 12,183
Referee: Kim Woo-sung
16 March 2025
14:00 UTC+9

Suwon FC	1–1	Ulsan HD
Luan Dias 13'		73' Erick Farias

Suwon Sports Complex, Suwon
Attendance: 5,557
Referee: Kim Yong-woo
16 March 2025
16:30 UTC+9

Gimcheon Sangmu	0–0	Gwangju FC

Gimcheon Stadium, Gimcheon
Attendance: 3,193
Referee: Lee Dong-jun
16 March 2025
16:30 UTC+9

Jeonbuk Hyundai Motors	2–2	Pohang Steelers
Jeon Jin-woo 25'; Park Jae-yong 29'		51' Lee Tae-seok; 84' Cho Sang-hyeok

Jeonju World Cup Stadium, Jeonju
Attendance: 10,442
Referee: Ko Hyung-jin

Matchday 6 (29–30 March)
29 March 2025
14:00 UTC+9

FC Seoul	3–2	Daegu FC
Lingard 45+4' (pen.); Jeong Seung-won 90+'; Moon Seon-min 90+3'		57' Yoshino; 79' Jung Chi-in

Seoul World Cup Stadium, Seoul
Attendance: 25,258
Referee: Kim Jong-hyeok
29 March 2025
16:30 UTC+9

Pohang Steelers	1–0	Ulsan HD
Lee Ho-jae 79'

Pohang Steel Yard, Pohang
Attendance: 12,565
Referee: Kim Dae-yong
29 March 2025
16:30 UTC+9

Daejeon Hana Citizen	1–1	Gwangju FC
Kim In-gyun 61'		33' Reis

Daejeon World Cup Stadium, Daejeon
Attendance: 11,469
Referee: Song Min-seok
30 March 2025
14:00 UTC+9

Jeju SK	1–0	Suwon FC
Kim Jun-ha 22'

Jeju World Cup Stadium, Seogwipo, Jeju Province
Attendance: 10,778
Referee: Ko Hyung-jin
30 March 2025
16:30 UTC+9

Gimcheon Sangmu	1–0	Gangwon FC
Lee Dong-gyeong 76'

Gimcheon Stadium, Gimcheon
Attendance: 2,026
Referee: Park Byeong-jin
30 March 2025
16:30 UTC+9

FC Anyang	0–1	Jeonbuk Hyundai Motors
		53' (pen.) Compagno

Anyang Stadium, Anyang
Attendance: 10,031
Referee: Chae Sang-hyeop

Matchday 7 (5–6 April)
5 April 2025
14:00 UTC+9

Ulsan HD	0–0	FC Seoul

Ulsan Munsu Football Stadium, Ulsan
Attendance: 20,358
Referee: Ko Hyung-jin
5 April 2025
16:30 UTC+9

Gimcheon Sangmu	2–0	Daegu FC
Kim Seung-sub 33'; Yu Kang-hyun 45'

Gimcheon Stadium, Gimcheon
Attendance: 3,740
Referee: Kim Yong-woo
5 April 2025
16:30 UTC+9

Daejeon Hana Citizen	0–2	Jeonbuk Hyundai Motors
		46' Jeon Jin-woo; 90' Jeon Byung-kwan

Daejeon World Cup Stadium, Daejeon
Attendance: 14,622
Referee: Lee Dong-jun
5 April 2025
19:00 UTC+9

Suwon FC	1–1	Pohang Steelers
Sabbag 13'		50' Oberdan

Suwon Sports Complex, Suwon
Attendance: 2,924
Referee: Kim Jong-hyeok
6 April 2025
16:30 UTC+9

FC Anyang	2–0	Gangwon FC
Choi Kyu-hyun 83'; Oude Kotte 90+2'

Anyang Stadium, Anyang
Attendance: 8,127
Referee: Seol Tae-hwan
6 April 2025
16:30 UTC+9

Gwangju FC	1–0	Jeju SK
Reis 90'

Gwangju World Cup Stadium, Gwangju
Attendance: 3,858
Referee: Shin Yong-jun

Matchday 8 (12–13 April)
12 April 2025
14:00 UTC+9

Suwon FC	3–2	Gimcheon Sangmu
Sabbag 37'; Yoon Bit-garam 77'; Lee Hyun-yong 90+7'		45' Lee Dong-gyeong; 68' Lee Dong-jun

Suwon Sports Complex, Suwon
Attendance: 2,066
Referee: Ko Hyung-jin
12 April 2025
16:30 UTC+9

FC Seoul	2–2	Daejeon Hana Citizen
Moon Seon-min 58'; Lingard 67'		43' (pen.), 45+2' Gutkovskis

Seoul World Cup Stadium, Seoul
Attendance: 20,284
Referee: Song Min-seok
12 April 2025
16:30 UTC+9

Pohang Steelers	2–1	FC Anyang
Cho Sang-hyeok 60'; Lee Ho-jae 74' (pen.)		18' (pen.) Bruno Mota

Pohang Steel Yard, Pohang
Attendance: 8,354
Referee: Park Byeong-jin
13 April 2025
14:00 UTC+9

Gangwon FC	1–0	Gwangju FC
Choi Byeong-chan 16'

Chuncheon Songam Sports Town, Chuncheon
Attendance: 5,080
Referee: Kim Dae-yong
13 April 2025
16:30 UTC+9

Jeonbuk Hyundai Motors	1–1	Jeju SK
Compagno 86'		41' Yu In-soo

Jeonju World Cup Stadium, Jeonju
Attendance: 10,958
Referee: Kim Woo-sung
13 April 2025
16:30 UTC+9

Daegu FC	0–1	Ulsan HD
		66' Kang Sang-woo

iM Bank Park, Daegu
Attendance: 12,218
Referee: Seol Tae-hwan

Matchday 9 (19–20 April)
19 April 2025
14:00 UTC+9

Ulsan HD	1–2	Gangwon FC
Erick Farias 45+3' (pen.)		17' Kim Gang-guk; 47' Shin Min-ha

Ulsan Munsu Football Stadium, Ulsan
Attendance: 13,536
Referee: Kim Woo-sung
19 April 2025
16:30 UTC+9

Gimcheon Sangmu	0–2	Daejeon Hana Citizen
		32' Kim Jun-beom; 55' (pen.) Joo Min-kyu

Gimcheon Stadium, Gimcheon
Attendance: 2,789
Referee: Choi Gwang-ho
19 April 2025
16:30 UTC+9

FC Anyang	3–1	Suwon FC
Yago 23'; Bruno Mota 49'; Matheus Oliveira 83'		39' Sabbag

Anyang Stadium, Anyang
Attendance: 4,508
Referee: Kim Jong-hyeok
19 April 2025
19:00 UTC+9

FC Seoul	1–2	Gwangju FC
Lingard 79'		43' Reis; 64' Park Tae-jun

Seoul World Cup Stadium, Seoul
Attendance: 19,234
Referee: Lee Dong-jun
20 April 2025
16:30 UTC+9

Jeju SK	2–0	Pohang Steelers
Kim Jun-ha 3'; Nam Tae-hee 78'

Jeju World Cup Stadium, Seogwipo, Jeju Province
Attendance: 5,531
Referee: Kim Yong-woo
20 April 2025
16:30 UTC+9

Jeonbuk Hyundai Motors	3–1	Daegu FC
Jeon Jin-woo 5', 39'; Compagno 18'		81' Jeong Jae-sang

Jeonju World Cup Stadium, Jeonju
Attendance: 12,897
Referee: Chae Sang-hyeop

Matchday 10 (9, 26–27 April)
9 April 2025
19:30 UTC+9

Gwangju FC	2–1	Daegu FC
Kang Hee-su 12'; Oh Hu-seong 45+2'		88' Cesinha

Gwangju World Cup Stadium, Gwangju
Attendance: 1,983
Referee: Kim Jong-hyeok
26 April 2025
14:00 UTC+9

Suwon FC	1–2	Jeonbuk Hyundai Motors
Lee Taek-geun 90+1'		65' Kim Jin-gyu; 90+6' Jeon Jin-woo

Suwon Sports Complex, Suwon
Attendance: 7,131
Referee: Seol Tae-hwan
26 April 2025
16:30 UTC+9

FC Anyang	2–1	Jeju SK
Bruno Mota 13'; Choi Kyu-hyun 61'		50' Yuri

Anyang Stadium, Anyang
Attendance: 5,939
Referee: Ko Hyung-jin
27 April 2025
14:00 UTC+9

Pohang Steelers	1–0	FC Seoul
Oberdan 7'

Pohang Steel Yard, Pohang
Attendance: 10,984
Referee: Kim Dae-yong
27 April 2025
16:30 UTC+9

Gimcheon Sangmu	2–0	Ulsan HD
Yu Kang-hyun 30'; Park Sang-hyeok 90'

Gimcheon Stadium, Gimcheon
Attendance: 3,300
Referee: Chae Sang-hyeop
27 April 2025
16:30 UTC+9

Daejeon Hana Citizen	1–0	Gangwon FC
Joo Min-kyu 74'

Daejeon World Cup Stadium, Daejeon
Attendance: 9,412
Referee: Song Min-seok

Matchday 11 (2–3 May)
2 May 2025
19:30 UTC+9

Ulsan HD	3–0	Gwangju FC
Lee Chung-yong 17'; Lacaba 76'; Erick Farias 90+3'

Ulsan Munsu Football Stadium, Ulsan
Attendance: 9,659
Referee: Seol Tae-hwan
2 May 2025
19:30 UTC+9

Pohang Steelers	1–2	Gimcheon Sangmu
Oberdan 75'		72', 90+5' Park Sang-hyeok

Pohang Steel Yard, Pohang
Attendance: 7,405
Referee: Lee Dong-jun
3 May 2025
16:30 UTC+9

Daejeon Hana Citizen	2–1	FC Anyang
Kim Hyeon-oh 37'; Victor Bobsin 80'		90+2' Chae Hyun-woo

Daejeon World Cup Stadium, Daejeon
Attendance: 12,570
Referee: Kim Woo-sung
3 May 2025
16:30 UTC+9

Daegu FC	3–1	Jeju SK
Yoshino 2'; Jung Chi-in 45+1'; Edgar 90+9'		67' Yuri

iM Bank Park, Daegu
Attendance: 11,325
Referee: Kim Yong-woo
3 May 2025
19:00 UTC+9

FC Seoul	0–1	Jeonbuk Hyundai Motors
		24' Song Min-kyu

Seoul World Cup Stadium, Seoul
Attendance: 48,008
Referee: Song Min-seok
3 May 2025
19:00 UTC+9

Gangwon FC	0–0	Suwon FC

Chuncheon Songam Sports Town, Chuncheon
Attendance: 5,105
Referee: Ko Hyung-jin

Matchday 12 (5–6 May)
5 May 2025
16:30 UTC+9

Gwangju FC	1–0	Gimcheon Sangmu
Oh Hu-seong 16' (pen.)

Gwangju World Cup Stadium, Gwangju
Attendance: 6,228
Referee: Ko Hyung-jin
5 May 2025
16:30 UTC+9

Ulsan HD	1–1	Pohang Steelers
Bojanić 45+3'		8' Oberdan

Ulsan Munsu Football Stadium, Ulsan
Attendance: 23,442
Referee: Kim Jong-hyeok
6 May 2025
14:00 UTC+9

Jeonbuk Hyundai Motors	1–1	Daejeon Hana Citizen
Jeon Jin-woo 88'		90+3' Kim In-gyun

Jeonju World Cup Stadium, Jeonju
Attendance: 24,338
Referee: Park Byeong-jin
6 May 2025
16:30 UTC+9

Jeju SK	0–3	Gangwon FC
		7' Kovačević; 46' Cho Jin-hyuk; 78' Lee Ji-ho

Jeju World Cup Stadium, Seogwipo, Jeju Province
Attendance: 11,017
Referee: Kim Dae-yong
6 May 2025
19:00 UTC+9

FC Anyang	1–1	FC Seoul
Matheus Oliveira 52'		81' Moon Seon-min

Anyang Stadium, Anyang
Attendance: 10,103
Referee: Chae Sang-hyeop
6 May 2025
19:00 UTC+9

Suwon FC	2–1	Daegu FC
Anderson 11'; Sabbag 77'		82' Caio Marcelo

Suwon Sports Complex, Suwon
Attendance: 3,114
Referee: Song Min-seok

Matchday 13 (10–11 May)
10 May 2025
16:30 UTC+9

Pohang Steelers	2–0	Suwon FC
Lee Ho-jae 42' (pen.), 46'

Pohang Steel Yard, Pohang
Attendance: 8,811
Referee: Kim Yong-woo
10 May 2025
19:00 UTC+9

Daejeon Hana Citizen	0–0	FC Seoul

Daejeon World Cup Stadium, Daejeon
Attendance: 13,706
Referee: Kim Jong-hyeok
10 May 2025
19:00 UTC+9

FC Anyang	2–2	Daegu FC
Bruno Mota 61'; Edgar 90+2' (o.g.)		6' Caio Marcelo; 87' Edgar

Anyang Stadium, Anyang
Attendance: 6,365
Referee: Choi Gwang-ho
11 May 2025
16:30 UTC+9

Jeju SK	1–2	Ulsan HD
Yuri 53'		5' Ludwigson; 65' Erick Farias

Jeju World Cup Stadium, Seogwipo, Jeju Province
Attendance: 8,012
Referee: Shin Yong-jun
11 May 2025
19:00 UTC+9

Gangwon FC	0–4	Gimcheon Sangmu
		5' Cho Hyun-taek; 36' Mo Jae-hyeon; 55' Park Sang-hyeok; 86' Lee Dong-jun

Chuncheon Songam Sports Town, Chuncheon
Attendance: 3,628
Referee: Seol Tae-hwan
11 May 2025
19:00 UTC+9

Gwangju FC	0–1	Jeonbuk Hyundai Motors
		39' Jeon Jin-woo

Gwangju World Cup Stadium, Gwangju
Attendance: 8,444
Referee: Lee Dong-jun

Matchday 14 (17–18 May)
17 May 2025
16:30 UTC+9

Jeonbuk Hyundai Motors	2–0	FC Anyang
Jeon Jin-woo 12', 36'

Jeonju World Cup Stadium, Jeonju
Attendance: 21,021
Referee: Kim Jong-hyeok
17 May 2025
19:00 UTC+9

Gangwon FC	1–1	Ulsan HD
Cho Jin-hyuk 90+3'		65' Seo Myung-gwan

Chuncheon Songam Sports Town, Chuncheon
Attendance: 6,920
Referee: Song Min-seok
17 May 2025
19:00 UTC+9

Gimcheon Sangmu	1–1	Jeju SK
Lee Dong-gyeong 59'		89' (pen.) Yuri

Gimcheon Stadium, Gimcheon
Attendance: 1,726
Referee: Park Byeong-jin
18 May 2025
16:30 UTC+9

Pohang Steelers	0–1	Gwangju FC
		89' Park In-hyeok

Pohang Steel Yard, Pohang
Attendance: 9,819
Referee: Kim Dae-yong
18 May 2025
16:30 UTC+9

Daegu FC	0–1	FC Seoul
		47' Dugandžić

iM Bank Park, Daegu
Attendance: 11,699
Referee: Ko Hyung-jin
18 May 2025
19:00 UTC+9

Suwon FC	3–0	Daejeon Hana Citizen
Choi Kyu-baek 83'; Anderson 90', 90+4'

Suwon Sports Complex, Suwon
Attendance: 3,579
Referee: Kim Woo-sung

Matchday 15 (23–25 May)
23 May 2025
19:30 UTC+9

Jeju SK	0–0	Jeonbuk Hyundai Motors

Jeju World Cup Stadium, Seogwipo, Jeju Province
Attendance: 6,224
Referee: Ko Hyung-jin
23 May 2025
19:30 UTC+9

FC Anyang	0–2	Pohang Steelers
		52' Eo Jeong-won; 60' Kim In-sung

Anyang Stadium, Anyang
Attendance: 6,124
Referee: Park Byeong-jin
24 May 2025
16:30 UTC+9

FC Seoul	1–1	Suwon FC
Lucas 43'		55' Anderson

Seoul World Cup Stadium, Seoul
Attendance: 25,578
Referee: Choi Gwang-ho
24 May 2025
19:00 UTC+9

Ulsan HD	3–2	Gimcheon Sangmu
Erick Farias 73' (pen.), 88'; Um Won-sang 90'		31' Lee Dong-gyeong; 59' Park Soo-il

Ulsan Munsu Football Stadium, Ulsan
Attendance: 16,012
Referee: Lee Dong-jun
24 May 2025
19:00 UTC+9

Daejeon Hana Citizen	2–1	Daegu FC
Joo Min-kyu 23' (pen.); Choi Geon-ju 57'		71' Kim Hyeon-jun

Daejeon World Cup Stadium, Daejeon
Attendance: 10,417
Referee: Shin Yong-jun
25 May 2025
16:30 UTC+9

Gwangju FC	0–1	Gangwon FC
		90+7' (pen.) Kim Dong-hyun

Gwangju World Cup Stadium, Gwangju
Attendance: 4,554
Referee: Kim Jong-hyeok

Matchday 16 (27–28 May)
27 May 2025
19:30 UTC+9

Suwon FC	0–1	Jeju SK
		35' Italo

Suwon Sports Complex, Suwon
Attendance: 1,884
Referee: Kim Dae-yong
27 May 2025
19:30 UTC+9

Daejeon Hana Citizen	1–3	Pohang Steelers
Joo Min-kyu 14'		33' Lee Ho-jae; 37' Jorge Teixeira; 71' Kim In-sung

Daejeon World Cup Stadium, Daejeon
Attendance: 5,833
Referee: Choi Gwang-ho
27 May 2025
19:30 UTC+9

Daegu FC	0–4	Jeonbuk Hyundai Motors
		17' (o.g.) Hwang Jae-won; 45+5' Tiago Orobó; 65' Jeon Jin-woo; 71' Lee Yeong-jae

iM Bank Park, Daegu
Attendance: 7,994
Referee: Lee Dong-jun
28 May 2025
19:30 UTC+9

Gimcheon Sangmu	0–1	FC Seoul
		80' Lucas

Gimcheon Stadium, Gimcheon
Attendance: 2,040
Referee: Ko Hyung-jin
28 May 2025
19:30 UTC+9

Gangwon FC	1–3	FC Anyang
Vitor Gabriel 74'		21', 26' Matheus Oliveira; 89' Bruno Mota

Chuncheon Songam Sports Town, Chuncheon
Attendance: 3,135
Referee: Kim Woo-sung
28 May 2025
19:30 UTC+9

Gwangju FC	1–1	Ulsan HD
Byeon Jun-soo 31'		47' Erick Farias

Gwangju World Cup Stadium, Gwangju
Attendance: 2,933
Referee: Park Byeong-jin

Matchday 17 (31 May–1 June)
31 May 2025
19:00 UTC+9

FC Seoul	1–3	Jeju SK
Al-Arab 70'		23', 67' Yu In-soo; 49' Lee Chang-min

Seoul World Cup Stadium, Seoul
Attendance: 24,270
Referee: Lee Dong-jun
31 May 2025
19:00 UTC+9

Jeonbuk Hyundai Motors	3–1	Ulsan HD
Song Min-kyu 25'; Park Jin-seob 86'; Tiago Orobó 90+7'		10' Lee Chung-yong

Jeonju World Cup Stadium, Jeonju
Attendance: 31,830
Referee: Kim Dae-yong
31 May 2025
19:00 UTC+9

FC Anyang	1–1	Daejeon Hana Citizen
Matheus Oliveira 52'		1' Ishida

Anyang Stadium, Anyang
Attendance: 8,752
Referee: Ko Hyung-jin
1 June 2025
19:00 UTC+9

Gimcheon Sangmu	1–1	Suwon FC
Park Sang-hyeok 77'		89' Jung Seung-bae

Gimcheon Stadium, Gimcheon
Attendance: 1,533
Referee: Park Byeong-jin
1 June 2025
19:00 UTC+9

Pohang Steelers	2–1	Gangwon FC
Jorge Teixeira 45+2'; Lee Ho-jae 68'		11' Vitor Gabriel

Pohang Steel Yard, Pohang
Attendance: 8,944
Referee: Kim Hee-gon
1 June 2025
19:00 UTC+9

Daegu FC	1–1	Gwangju FC
Bruno Lamas 67' (pen.)		43' (pen.) Asani

iM Bank Park, Daegu
Attendance: 11,111
Referee: Choi Gwang-ho

Matchday 18 (1 April, 13–14 June)
1 April 2025
19:30 UTC+9

Ulsan HD	2–3	Daejeon Hana Citizen
Park Min-seo 42'; Lee Hee-gyun 45+4'		4' Shin Sang-eun; 13' (pen.) Kim Hyeon-ug; 64' Joo Min-kyu

Ulsan Munsu Football Stadium, Ulsan
Attendance: 6,902
Referee: Shin Yong-jun
13 June 2025
19:30 UTC+9

Gangwon FC	0–3	Jeonbuk Hyundai Motors
		6', 32' Tiago Orobó; 79' Jeon Jin-woo

Chuncheon Songam Sports Town, Chuncheon
Attendance: 6,219
Referee: Shin Yong-jun
13 June 2025
19:30 UTC+9

Gwangju FC	1–3	FC Seoul
Reis 90+5'		10' Jeong Seung-won; 55' Dugandžić; 69' Moon Seon-min

Gwangju World Cup Stadium, Gwangju
Attendance: 2,746
Referee: Kim Woo-sung
14 June 2025
19:00 UTC+9

Gimcheon Sangmu	1–0	Pohang Steelers
Lee Dong-jun 29'

Gimcheon Stadium, Gimcheon
Attendance: 2,681
Referee: Chae Sang-hyeop
14 June 2025
19:00 UTC+9

Suwon FC	1–2	FC Anyang
Roh Kyung-ho 42'		65', 75' Bruno Mota

Suwon Sports Complex, Suwon
Attendance: 7,524
Referee: Kim Yong-woo
14 June 2025
19:00 UTC+9

Jeju SK	2–1	Daegu FC
Yuri 67'; Denilson 81'		41' Kim Ju-gong

Jeju World Cup Stadium, Seogwipo, Jeju Province
Attendance: 6,542
Referee: Song Min-seok

Matchday 19 (23 April, 17–18 June)
23 April 2025
19:30 UTC+9

FC Anyang	0–1	Ulsan HD
		51' (pen.) Erick Farias

Anyang Stadium, Anyang
Attendance: 5,592
Referee: Kim Dae-yong
17 June 2025
19:30 UTC+9

FC Seoul	1–1	Gangwon FC
Moon Seon-min 72'		25' Lee Sang-heon

Seoul World Cup Stadium, Seoul
Attendance: 15,290
Referee: Choi Gwang-ho
17 June 2025
19:30 UTC+9

Jeonbuk Hyundai Motors	3–2	Suwon FC
Kim Jin-gyu 52'; Compagno 72'; Kim Tae-han 89' (o.g.)		5' Kim Do-yoon; 31' Sabbag

Jeonju World Cup Stadium, Jeonju
Attendance: 11,355
Referee: Kim Jong-hyeok
17 June 2025
19:30 UTC+9

Daegu FC	1–1	Pohang Steelers
Edgar 83'		32' Oberdan

iM Bank Park, Daegu
Attendance: 9,384
Referee: Shin Yong-jun
18 June 2025
19:30 UTC+9

Jeju SK	0–1	Gwangju FC
		46' Jung Ji-hun

Jeju World Cup Stadium, Seogwipo, Jeju Province
Attendance: 5,307
Referee: Park Byeong-jin
18 June 2025
19:30 UTC+9

Daejeon Hana Citizen	0–0	Gimcheon Sangmu

Daejeon World Cup Stadium, Daejeon
Attendance: 5,016
Referee: Lee Dong-jun

Matchday 20 (21–22 June, 2 August)
21 June 2025
19:00 UTC+9

Gangwon FC	3–0	Daegu FC
Mo Jae-hyeon 45'; Kim Gun-hee 74'; Lee Sang-heon 78'

Gangneung Stadium, Gangneung
Attendance: 9,256
Referee: Kim Dae-yong
21 June 2025
19:00 UTC+9

Pohang Steelers	2–1	Jeju SK
Jorge Teixeira 63'; Kim In-sung 90+1'		90+8' Nam Tae-hee

Pohang Steel Yard, Pohang
Attendance: 6,204
Referee: Kim Woo-sung
21 June 2025
19:00 UTC+9

Jeonbuk Hyundai Motors	1–1	FC Seoul
Song Min-kyu 45+2'		25' Ryu Jae-moon

Jeonju World Cup Stadium, Jeonju
Attendance: 22,862
Referee: Ko Hyung-jin
22 June 2025
19:00 UTC+9

Gimcheon Sangmu	1–0	FC Anyang
Lee Seung-won 84'

Gimcheon Stadium, Gimcheon
Attendance: 1,774
Referee: Song Min-seok
22 June 2025
19:00 UTC+9

Gwangju FC	2–2	Daejeon Hana Citizen
Asani 56'; Park In-hyeok 72'		69', 78' Gutkovskis

Gwangju World Cup Stadium, Gwangju
Attendance: 3,055
Referee: Chae Sang-hyeop
2 August 2025
19:00 UTC+9

Ulsan HD	2–3	Suwon FC
Cho Hyun-taek 50'; Ko Seung-beom 63'		59', 67' Sabbag; 70' Willyan

Ulsan Munsu Football Stadium, Ulsan
Attendance: 10,197
Referee: Shin Yong-jun

Matchday 21 (27–29 June, 12 July)
27 June 2025
19:30 UTC+9

Gimcheon Sangmu	1–2	Jeonbuk Hyundai Motors
Won Ki-jong 80'		37', 52' Compagno

Gimcheon Stadium, Gimcheon
Attendance: 3,840
Referee: Kim Dae-yong
27 June 2025
19:30 UTC+9

Daejeon Hana Citizen	1–1	Jeju SK
Jeong Jae-hee 78'		90+6' Nam Tae-hee

Daejeon World Cup Stadium, Daejeon
Attendance: 7,097
Referee: Shin Yong-jun
28 June 2025
19:00 UTC+9

Suwon FC	1–2	Gangwon FC
Luan Dias 46'		38' Vitor Gabriel; 90+1' Kim Dae-won

Suwon Sports Complex, Suwon
Attendance: 3,401
Referee: Park Byeong-jin
28 June 2025
19:00 UTC+9

FC Anyang	1–2	Gwangju FC
Chae Hyun-woo 42'		12' Sin Chang-moo; 38' Asani

Anyang Stadium, Anyang
Attendance: 7,253
Referee: Lee Dong-jun
29 June 2025
19:00 UTC+9

FC Seoul	4–1	Pohang Steelers
Lingard 17' (pen.); Lucas 33'; Dugandžić 45+4'; Klimala 85'		75' Lee Dong-hee

Seoul World Cup Stadium, Seoul
Attendance: 20,036
Referee: Kim Jong-hyeok
12 July 2025
19:00 UTC+9

Ulsan HD	2–2	Daegu FC
Lee Jin-hyun 64'; Woo Joo-sung 79' (o.g.)		33', 87' Cesinha

Ulsan Munsu Football Stadium, Ulsan
Attendance: 14,555
Referee: Kim Yong-woo

Matchday 22 (18–20 July)
18 July 2025
19:30 UTC+9

Suwon FC	2–1	Gwangju FC
Willyan 85'; Kim Kyeong-min 90' (o.g.)		78' (pen.) Asani

Suwon Sports Complex, Suwon
Attendance: 2,036
Referee: Song Min-seok
18 July 2025
19:30 UTC+9

Daegu FC	2–3	Gimcheon Sangmu
Cesinha 19'; Kim Ju-gong 22'		37' Park Sang-hyeok; 54' Kim Gang-san; 90+2' Won Ki-jong

iM Bank Park, Daegu
Attendance: 8,562
Referee: Chae Sang-hyeop
19 July 2025
19:00 UTC+9

Gangwon FC	2–2	Daejeon Hana Citizen
Mo Jae-hyeon 90+5'; Kim Gun-hee 90+6'		51' (pen.) Kim Hyeon-ug; 60' Hernandes

Gangneung Stadium, Gangneung
Attendance: 10,207
Referee: Kim Jong-hyeok
19 July 2025
19:00 UTC+9

Pohang Steelers	2–3	Jeonbuk Hyundai Motors
Hong Yun-sang 32'; Lee Ho-jae 44'		65' Lee Seung-woo; 80' Tiago Orobó; 90+5' (o.g.) Lee Ho-jae

Pohang Steel Yard, Pohang
Attendance: 13,973
Referee: Lee Dong-jun
19 July 2025
19:00 UTC+9

Jeju SK	2–0	FC Anyang
Oh Jae-hyeok 69'; Yuri 79'

Jeju World Cup Stadium, Seogwipo, Jeju Province
Attendance: 7,120
Referee: Kim Dae-yong
20 July 2025
19:00 UTC+9

FC Seoul	1–0	Ulsan HD
Lingard 42'

Seoul World Cup Stadium, Seoul
Attendance: 24,047
Referee: Ko Hyung-jin

=== Matches 23–33 ===
Teams played each other once, either at home or away.

Home \ Away	AYG	DGU	DHC	GWN	GCS	GJU	JSK	JHM	PHS	SEL	SWN	USH
FC Anyang	—	4–0	3–2	—	4–1	0–0	2–1	—	0–1	—	—	—
Daegu FC	—	—	—	2–2	—	—	2–2	—	—	—	3–1	1–1
Daejeon Hana Citizen	—	3–2	—	—	2–1	—	3–1	—	—	—	3–2	—
Gangwon FC	1–1	—	0–0	—	0–0	—	—	—	1–0	3–2	—	—
Gimcheon Sangmu	—	1–2	—	—	—	—	3–1	—	2–0	6–2	3–2	3–0
Gwangju FC	—	2–3	2–0	0–1	1–1	—	—	1–2	—	—	—	—
Jeju SK	—	—	—	0–0	—	0–1	—	1–1	—	3–2	3–4	—
Jeonbuk Hyundai Motors	2–1	3–0	1–0	2–0	1–2	—	—	—	—	—	2–0	—
Pohang Steelers	—	—	1–3	—	—	1–0	1–0	3–1	—	—	1–5	1–1
FC Seoul	1–2	2–2	—	—	—	3–0	—	1–1	1–2	—	—	3–2
Suwon FC	2–1	—	—	1–0	—	2–4	—	—	—	1–1	—	4–2
Ulsan HD	0–0	—	1–2	—	—	2–0	1–0	0–2	—	—	—	—

Source: K League
Legend: Blue = home team win; Yellow = draw; Red = away team win.

Matchday 23 (22–23 July)
22 July 2025
19:30 UTC+9

Pohang Steelers	1–5	Suwon FC
Hong Yun-sang 41'		19' Lee Ji-sol; 38' Sabbag; 65', 79' Willyan; 83' Ahn Hyeon-beom

Pohang Steel Yard, Pohang
Attendance: 8,260
Referee: Kim Yong-woo
22 July 2025
19:30 UTC+9

Gwangju FC	1–1	Gimcheon Sangmu
Asani 37'		73' Lee Dong-gyeong

Gwangju World Cup Stadium, Gwangju
Attendance: 1,710
Referee: Lee Dong-jun
22 July 2025
19:30 UTC+9

FC Anyang	4–0	Daegu FC
Yago 37' (pen.); Kim Bo-kyung 45+4'; Choe Seong-beom 82'; Bruno Mota 90+3'

Anyang Stadium, Anyang
Attendance: 5,368
Referee: Seol Tae-hwan
23 July 2025
19:30 UTC+9

Ulsan HD	1–2	Daejeon Hana Citizen
Erick Farias 43'		45' Lee Myung-jae; 90+4' Kim Jun-beom

Ulsan Munsu Football Stadium, Ulsan
Attendance: 8,127
Referee: Song Min-seok
23 July 2025
19:30 UTC+9

Jeju SK	3–2	FC Seoul
Yuri 38'; Lee Chang-min 64'; Rim Chang-woo 90+4'		45+1' Cho Young-wook; 59' Park Seong-hoon

Jeju World Cup Stadium, Seogwipo, Jeju Province
Attendance: 7,084
Referee: Jeong Dong-sik
23 July 2025
19:30 UTC+9

Jeonbuk Hyundai Motors	2–0	Gangwon FC
Kim Jin-gyu 39'; Compagno 43' (pen.)

Jeonju World Cup Stadium, Jeonju
Attendance: 13,795
Referee: Jung Hoe-su

Matchday 24 (26–27 July)
26 July 2025
19:00 UTC+9

Gimcheon Sangmu	3–1	Jeju SK
Park Sang-hyeok 46'; Kim Yi-seok 62'; Kim Gang-san 66'		77' (o.g.) Kim Gang-san

Gimcheon Stadium, Gimcheon
Attendance: 1,922
Referee: Kim Jong-hyeok
26 July 2025
19:00 UTC+9

Suwon FC	2–1	FC Anyang
Sabbag 16'; Willyan 23'		8' Matheus Oliveira

Suwon Sports Complex, Suwon
Attendance: 8,027
Referee: Ko Hyung-jin
26 July 2025
19:00 UTC+9

Gwangju FC	1–2	Jeonbuk Hyundai Motors
Ha Seung-un 76'		14' Kim Jin-gyu; 90+4' Tiago Orobó

Gwangju World Cup Stadium, Gwangju
Attendance: 9,544
Referee: Kim Woo-sung
27 July 2025
19:00 UTC+9

Gangwon FC	2–2	Ulsan HD
Kim Dae-won 51'; Hong Chul 90+7'		30', 83' Marcão

Gangneung Stadium, Gangneung
Attendance: 9,144
Referee: Chae Sang-hyeop
27 July 2025
19:00 UTC+9

Daejeon Hana Citizen	0–1	FC Seoul
		56' (pen.) Lingard

Daejeon World Cup Stadium, Daejeon
Attendance: 11,029
Referee: Kim Dae-yong
27 July 2025
19:00 UTC+9

Daegu FC	0–1	Pohang Steelers
		68' (pen.) Lee Ho-jae

iM Bank Park, Daegu
Attendance: 10,153
Referee: Lee Dong-jun

Matchday 25 (8–10 August)
8 August 2025
19:30 UTC+9

FC Seoul	2–2	Daegu FC
Kim Jin-su 14'; Lucas 41'		35' Cesinha; 64' Jung Chi-in

Seoul World Cup Stadium, Seoul
Attendance: 15,778
Referee: Kim Jong-hyeok
8 August 2025
19:30 UTC+9

Jeonbuk Hyundai Motors	2–1	FC Anyang
Park Jin-seob 22'; Lee Seung-woo 89'		75' Oude Kotte

Jeonju World Cup Stadium, Jeonju
Attendance: 21,346
Referee: Kim Dae-yong
9 August 2025
19:30 UTC+9

Ulsan HD	1–0	Jeju SK
Ludwigson 73'

Ulsan Munsu Football Stadium, Ulsan
Attendance: 10,510
Referee: Park Byeong-jin
9 August 2025
19:30 UTC+9

Gangwon FC	0–0	Gimcheon Sangmu

Gangneung Stadium, Gangneung
Attendance: 9,415
Referee: Shin Yong-jun
10 August 2025
19:00 UTC+9

Pohang Steelers	1–0	Gwangju FC
Hong Yun-sang 45+4'

Pohang Steel Yard, Pohang
Attendance: 10,020
Referee: Song Min-seok
10 August 2025
19:00 UTC+9

Daejeon Hana Citizen	3–2	Suwon FC
Choi Geon-ju 1'; Joo Min-kyu 76'; Kim Jun-beom 83'		45+2' Sabbag; 45+4' Luan Dias

Daejeon World Cup Stadium, Daejeon
Attendance: 9,022
Referee: Seol Tae-hwan

Matchday 26 (15–17 August)
15 August 2025
19:00 UTC+9

Jeju SK	0–0	Gangwon FC

Jeju World Cup Stadium, Seogwipo, Jeju Province
Attendance: 8,093
Referee: Kim Woo-sung
15 August 2025
19:00 UTC+9

FC Anyang	0–1	Pohang Steelers
		6' Lee Ho-jae

Anyang Stadium, Anyang
Attendance: 8,122
Referee: Kim Jong-hyeok
16 August 2025
19:00 UTC+9

Jeonbuk Hyundai Motors	3–0	Daegu FC
Compagno 27', 55'; Jeon Jin-woo 83'

Jeonju World Cup Stadium, Jeonju
Attendance: 23,460
Referee: Ko Hyung-jin
16 August 2025
20:00 UTC+9

Suwon FC	4–2	Ulsan HD
Sabbag 2', 75'; Willyan 61' (pen.); Roh Kyung-ho 90+2'		6' Marcão; 90+8' Ludwigson

Suwon Sports Complex, Suwon
Attendance: 5,702
Referee: Song Min-seok
17 August 2025
19:00 UTC+9

Gimcheon Sangmu	6–2	FC Seoul
Won Ki-jong 10'; Kim Seung-sub 18'; Maeng Seong-ung 45+4'; Lee Dong-gyeong 52' (pen.); Lee Dong-jun 90+1'; Kim Chan 90+14' (pen.)		27' Cho Young-wook; 40' Anderson

Gimcheon Stadium, Gimcheon
Attendance: 2,667
Referee: Park Byeong-jin
17 August 2025
19:00 UTC+9

Gwangju FC	2–0	Daejeon Hana Citizen
Reis 27', 65'

Gwangju World Cup Stadium, Gwangju
Attendance: 3,278
Referee: Shin Yong-jun

Matchday 27 (23–24 August)
23 August 2025
19:00 UTC+9

Gimcheon Sangmu	3–2	Suwon FC
Park Sang-hyeok 26'; Kim Gang-san 45+2'; Lee Dong-gyeong 90+2'		9' Luan Dias; 64' Willyan

Gimcheon Stadium, Gimcheon
Attendance: 2,303
Referee: Seol Tae-hwan
23 August 2025
19:00 UTC+9

Daegu FC	2–2	Jeju SK
Yuri 51' (o.g.); Cesinha 56'		48' Kim Ryun-seong; 54' Yuri

iM Bank Park, Daegu
Attendance: 7,586
Referee: Jeong Dong-sik
23 August 2025
19:30 UTC+9

Gwangju FC	0–1	Gangwon FC
		21' Lee Ji-ho

Gwangju World Cup Stadium, Gwangju
Attendance: 3,044
Referee: Kim Jong-hyeok
24 August 2025
19:00 UTC+9

FC Seoul	3–2	Ulsan HD
Choi Jun 7'; Cho Young-wook 31'; Hwang Do-yun 39'		23' Ko Seung-beom; 90+4' Erick Farias

Seoul World Cup Stadium, Seoul
Attendance: 20,737
Referee: Ko Hyung-jin
24 August 2025
19:00 UTC+9

Pohang Steelers	3–1	Jeonbuk Hyundai Motors
Jorge Teixeira 1', 45' (pen.); Park Seung-wook 24'		16' (pen.) Tiago Orobó

Pohang Steel Yard, Pohang
Attendance: 11,582
Referee: Park Byeong-jin
24 August 2025
19:00 UTC+9

FC Anyang	3–2	Daejeon Hana Citizen
Yago 45+3'; Matheus Oliveira 75', 90+2'		1' João Victor; 59' Yu Kang-hyun

Anyang Stadium, Anyang
Attendance: 6,317
Referee: Song Min-seok

Matchday 28 (30–31 August)
30 August 2025
19:00 UTC+9

Ulsan HD	0–2	Jeonbuk Hyundai Motors
		54' Lee Yeong-jae; 59' Jeon Jin-woo

Ulsan Munsu Football Stadium, Ulsan
Attendance: 23,294
Referee: Seol Tae-hwan
30 August 2025
19:00 UTC+9

Daegu FC	3–1	Suwon FC
Park Dae-hoon 80', 90+8'; Caio Marcelo 90+4'		22' (pen.) Willyan

iM Bank Park, Daegu
Attendance: 7,324
Referee: Kim Jong-hyeok
30 August 2025
19:00 UTC+9

Jeju SK	0–1	Gwangju FC
		90+2' (pen.) Park In-hyeok

Jeju World Cup Stadium, Seogwipo, Jeju Province
Attendance: 6,967
Referee: Ko Hyung-jin
31 August 2025
19:00 UTC+9

FC Seoul	1–2	FC Anyang
Kwon Kyung-won 48' (o.g.)		4' Oude Kotte; 79' Bruno Mota

Seoul World Cup Stadium, Seoul
Attendance: 20,027
Referee: Kim Yong-woo
31 August 2025
19:00 UTC+9

Gangwon FC	1–0	Pohang Steelers
Mo Jae-hyeon 40'

Gangneung Stadium, Gangneung
Attendance: 8,505
Referee: Song Min-seok
31 August 2025
19:00 UTC+9

Daejeon Hana Citizen	2–1	Gimcheon Sangmu
João Victor 63'; Kryvotsyuk 90+8'		58' Kim Seung-sub

Daejeon World Cup Stadium, Daejeon
Attendance: 6,534
Referee: Kim Woo-sung

Matchday 29 (13–14 September)
13 September 2025
19:00 UTC+9

Gangwon FC	3–2	FC Seoul
Lee You-hyeon 40'; Kim Gun-hee 52' (pen.); Lee Sang-heon 55'		66' Cho Young-wook; 75' Kim Jin-su

Gangneung Stadium, Gangneung
Attendance: 7,572
Referee: Ko Hyung-jin
13 September 2025
19:00 UTC+9

Pohang Steelers	1–1	Ulsan HD
Lee Ho-jae 41'		44' Heo Yool

Pohang Steel Yard, Pohang
Attendance: 14,166
Referee: Kim Yong-woo
13 September 2025
19:00 UTC+9

Jeonbuk Hyundai Motors	1–0	Daejeon Hana Citizen
Compagno 65' (pen.)

Jeonju World Cup Stadium, Jeonju
Attendance: 22,588
Referee: Kim Jong-hyeok
14 September 2025
19:00 UTC+9

FC Anyang	2–1	Jeju SK
Yago 36'; Jukić 81'		14' Song Ju-hun

Anyang Stadium, Anyang
Attendance: 7,412
Referee: Seol Tae-hwan
14 September 2025
19:00 UTC+9

Gimcheon Sangmu	1–2	Daegu FC
Lee Dong-gyeong 90+4' (pen.)		66' Jang Seong-won; 87' Caio Marcelo

Gimcheon Stadium, Gimcheon
Attendance: 3,872
Referee: Song Min-seok
14 September 2025
19:00 UTC+9

Suwon FC	2–4	Gwangju FC
Sabbag 24' (pen.); Park In-hyeok 41' (o.g.)		9' (o.g.) An Jun-su; 36' Byeon Jun-soo; 83' Cho Sung-gwon; 90+6' Reis

Suwon Sports Complex, Suwon
Attendance: 3,354
Referee: Kim Hee-gon

Matchday 30 (20–21 September)
20 September 2025
16:30 UTC+9

Jeonbuk Hyundai Motors	1–2	Gimcheon Sangmu
Kim Jin-gyu 63'		39' Kim Seung-sub; 45+3' Park Sang-hyeok

Jeonju World Cup Stadium, Jeonju
Attendance: 17,212
Referee: Ko Hyung-jin
20 September 2025
19:00 UTC+9

Daejeon Hana Citizen	3–2	Daegu FC
Ishida 25'; Joo Min-kyu 31', 57'		72' Edgar; 90+7' Kim Hyeon-jun

Daejeon World Cup Stadium, Daejeon
Attendance: 21,045
Referee: Kim Yong-woo
21 September 2025
16:30 UTC+9

Ulsan HD	0–0	FC Anyang

Ulsan Munsu Football Stadium, Ulsan
Attendance: 13,201
Referee: Song Min-seok
21 September 2025
16:30 UTC+9

Suwon FC	1–0	Gangwon FC
Tući 47' (o.g.)

Suwon Sports Complex, Suwon
Attendance: 4,005
Referee: Seol Tae-hwan
21 September 2025
19:00 UTC+9

FC Seoul	3–0	Gwangju FC
Dugandžić 68'; Lee Seung-mo 80'; Moon Seon-min 84'

Seoul World Cup Stadium, Seoul
Attendance: 15,221
Referee: Kim Jong-hyeok
21 September 2025
19:00 UTC+9

Pohang Steelers	1–0	Jeju SK
Lee Ho-jae 56'

Pohang Steel Yard, Pohang
Attendance: 9,014
Referee: Lee Dong-jun

Matchday 31 (27–28 September)
27 September 2025
14:00 UTC+9

Gangwon FC	0–0	Daejeon Hana Citizen

Gangneung Stadium, Gangneung
Attendance: 7,112
Referee: Kim Dae-yong
27 September 2025
16:30 UTC+9

Gimcheon Sangmu	2–0	Pohang Steelers
Lee Dong-gyeong 61'; Won Ki-jong 86'

Gimcheon Stadium, Gimcheon
Attendance: 3,634
Referee: Kim Woo-sung
27 September 2025
16:30 UTC+9

Daegu FC	1–1	Ulsan HD
Cesinha 40'		59' Baek In-woo

iM Bank Park, Daegu
Attendance: 10,601
Referee: Ko Hyung-jin
27 September 2025
19:00 UTC+9

FC Seoul	1–1	Jeonbuk Hyundai Motors
Yeon Je-un 90+6' (o.g.)		84' Song Min-kyu

Seoul World Cup Stadium, Seoul
Attendance: 31,348
Referee: Seol Tae-hwan
28 September 2025
16:30 UTC+9

Jeju SK	3–4	Suwon FC
Yuri 15'; Nam Tae-hee 45+7'; Shin Sang-eun 82'		3', 38' (pen.) Sabbag; 50' Lee Jae-won; 90+3' Choi Chi-ung

Jeju World Cup Stadium, Seogwipo, Jeju Province
Attendance: 5,142
Referee: Shin Yong-jun
28 September 2025
16:30 UTC+9

FC Anyang	0–0	Gwangju FC

Anyang Stadium, Anyang
Attendance: 7,435
Referee: Lee Dong-jun

Matchday 32 (3–5 October)
3 October 2025
14:00 UTC+9

Jeju SK	1–1	Jeonbuk Hyundai Motors
Nam Tae-hee 90+7'		28' Tiago Orobó

Jeju World Cup Stadium, Seogwipo, Jeju Province
Attendance: 6,102
Referee: Lee Dong-jun
4 October 2025
14:00 UTC+9

Gwangju FC	2–3	Daegu FC
Reis 41' (pen.); Oh Hu-seong 51' (pen.)		5' (pen.), 90+6' (pen.) Cesinha; 37' Jeong Jae-sang

Gwangju World Cup Stadium, Gwangju
Attendance: 6,731
Referee: Chae Sang-hyeop
5 October 2025
14:00 UTC+9

Gimcheon Sangmu	3–0	Ulsan HD
Lee Dong-jun 29'; Kim Seung-sub 79'; Lee Dong-gyeong 81'

Gimcheon Stadium, Gimcheon
Attendance: 4,239
Referee: Shin Yong-jun
5 October 2025
14:00 UTC+9

Pohang Steelers	1–3	Daejeon Hana Citizen
Lee Ho-jae 35' (pen.)		3', 52' Ishida; 60' Hernandes

Pohang Steel Yard, Pohang
Attendance: 11,821
Referee: Ko Hyung-jin
5 October 2025
16:30 UTC+9

Gangwon FC	1–1	FC Anyang
Kim Gun-hee 74'		87' Kim Bo-kyung

Gangneung Stadium, Gangneung
Attendance: 8,464
Referee: Kim Jong-hyeok
5 October 2025
16:30 UTC+9

Suwon FC	1–1	FC Seoul
Luan Dias 18'		26' Cho Young-wook

Suwon Sports Complex, Suwon
Attendance: 7,304
Referee: Kim Dae-yong

Matchday 33 (18 October)
18 October 2025
14:00 UTC+9

Ulsan HD	2–0	Gwangju FC
Ludwigson 21'; Lee Chung-yong 90+13' (pen.)

Ulsan Munsu Football Stadium, Ulsan
Attendance: 10,294
Referee: Kim Yong-woo
18 October 2025
14:00 UTC+9

FC Seoul	1–2	Pohang Steelers
Cho Young-wook 67'		29' Lee Ho-jae; 85' Juninho Rocha

Seoul World Cup Stadium, Seoul
Attendance: 23,672
Referee: Shin Yong-jun
18 October 2025
14:00 UTC+9

Daejeon Hana Citizen	3–1	Jeju SK
Hernandes 32' (pen.); João Victor 45+2'; Ishida 51'		82' Nam Tae-hee

Daejeon World Cup Stadium, Daejeon
Attendance: 10,425
Referee: Jeong Dong-sik
18 October 2025
14:00 UTC+9

Jeonbuk Hyundai Motors	2–0	Suwon FC
Compagno 3'; Tiago Orobó 62' (pen.)

Jeonju World Cup Stadium, Jeonju
Attendance: 21,899
Referee: Kim Hee-gon
18 October 2025
14:00 UTC+9

Daegu FC	2–2	Gangwon FC
Cesinha 80' (pen.); Edgar 90+6'		6' Lee Sang-heon; 16' Seo Min-woo

iM Bank Park, Daegu
Attendance: 10,795
Referee: Song Min-seok
18 October 2025
14:00 UTC+9

FC Anyang	4–1	Gimcheon Sangmu
Han Ga-ram 1'; Moon Seong-woo 39'; Bruno Mota 57', 90'		70' Won Ki-jong

Anyang Stadium, Anyang
Attendance: 7,178
Referee: Ko Hyung-jin

=== Matches 34–38 ===
Teams played each other once, either at home or away.

==== Final A ====
Home \ Away	DHC	GWN	GCS	JHM	PHS	SEL
Daejeon Hana Citizen	—	1–1	—	—	2–0	3–1
Gangwon FC	—	—	—	0–0	1–0	—
Gimcheon Sangmu	0–3	0–1	—	—	0–1	—
Jeonbuk Hyundai Motors	3–1	—	2–3	—	—	2–1
Pohang Steelers	—	—	—	0–0	—	0–0
FC Seoul	—	4–2	1–3	—	—	—

Source: K League
Legend: Blue = home team win; Yellow = draw; Red = away team win.

Matchday 34 (25–26 October)
25 October 2025
14:00 UTC+9

Jeonbuk Hyundai Motors	2–3	Gimcheon Sangmu
Lee Seung-woo 6'; Jeon Jin-woo 30'		27' (o.g.) Tiago Orobó; 48' (o.g.) Song Bum-keun; 72' Lee Dong-gyeong

Jeonju World Cup Stadium, Jeonju
Attendance: 8,498
Referee: Chae Sang-hyeop
26 October 2025
14:00 UTC+9

FC Seoul	4–2	Gangwon FC
Lingard 73', 78'; Ryu Jae-moon 80'; Cheon Seong-hoon 90+10'		12' Kim Gun-hee; 53' (pen.) Mo Jae-hyeon

Seoul World Cup Stadium, Seoul
Attendance: 12,177
Referee: Ko Hyung-jin
26 October 2025
16:30 UTC+9

Daejeon Hana Citizen	2–0	Pohang Steelers
Lee Myung-jae 27'; Joo Min-kyu 45' (pen.)

Daejeon World Cup Stadium, Daejeon
Attendance: 8,275
Referee: Kim Dae-yong

Matchday 35 (1 November)
1 November 2025
14:00 UTC+9

Gangwon FC	0–0	Jeonbuk Hyundai Motors

Gangneung Stadium, Gangneung
Attendance: 6,424
Referee: Shin Yong-jun
1 November 2025
14:00 UTC+9

Daejeon Hana Citizen	3–1	FC Seoul
Kryvotsyuk 47'; Ishida 76'; Yu Kang-hyun 84'		54' (o.g.) Ha Chang-rae

Daejeon World Cup Stadium, Daejeon
Attendance: 9,353
Referee: Kim Jong-hyeok
1 November 2025
16:30 UTC+9

Gimcheon Sangmu	0–1	Pohang Steelers
		Juninho Rocha 71'

Gimcheon Stadium, Gimcheon
Attendance: 2,147
Referee: Kim Hee-gon

Matchday 36 (8–9 November)
8 November 2025
16:30 UTC+9

Gimcheon Sangmu	0–1	Gangwon FC
		Park Sang-hyeok 31'

Gimcheon Stadium, Gimcheon
Attendance: 1,405
Referee: Song Min-seok
8 November 2025
16:30 UTC+9

Jeonbuk Hyundai Motors	3–1	Daejeon Hana Citizen
Song Min-kyu 57'; Lee Dong-jun 90'; Lee Seung-woo 90+7' (pen.)		75' (pen.) Hernandes

Jeonju World Cup Stadium, Jeonju
Attendance: 23,160
Referee: Kim Woo-sung
9 November 2025
14:00 UTC+9

Pohang Steelers	0–0	FC Seoul

Pohang Steel Yard, Pohang
Attendance: 10,493
Referee: Chae Sang-hyeop

Matchday 37 (22 November)
22 November 2025
14:00 UTC+9

FC Seoul	1–3	Gimcheon Sangmu
Lingard 45+1'		33' Kim Ju-chan; 89' Park Se-jin; 90+4' Park Tae-jun

Seoul World Cup Stadium, Seoul
Attendance: 13,247
Referee: Shin Yong-jun
22 November 2025
14:00 UTC+9

Daejeon Hana Citizen	1–1	Gangwon FC
Kang Yoon-sung 22'		61' Park Sang-hyeok

Daejeon World Cup Stadium, Daejeon
Attendance: 9,102
Referee: Kim Yong-woo
22 November 2025
16:30 UTC+9

Pohang Steelers	0–0	Jeonbuk Hyundai Motors

Pohang Steel Yard, Pohang
Attendance: 10,572
Referee: Park Byeong-jin

Matchday 38 (30 November)
30 November 2025
16:30 UTC+9

Jeonbuk Hyundai Motors	2–1	FC Seoul
Lee Dong-jun 56'; Jeon Jin-woo 90+3' (pen.)		60' Park Soo-il

Jeonju World Cup Stadium, Jeonju
Attendance: 21,742
Referee: Kim Jong-hyeok
30 November 2025
16:30 UTC+9

Gimcheon Sangmu	0–3	Daejeon Hana Citizen
		44', 73' Seo Jin-su; 53' João Victor

Gimcheon Stadium, Gimcheon
Attendance: 2,804
Referee: Lee Dong-jun
30 November 2025
16:30 UTC+9

Gangwon FC	1–0	Pohang Steelers
Mo Jae-hyeon 62'

Gangneung Stadium, Gangneung
Attendance: 6,524
Referee: Kim Woo-sung

==== Final B ====
Home \ Away	AYG	DGU	GJU	JSK	SWN	USH
FC Anyang	—	—	—	—	0–1	3–1
Daegu FC	2–2	—	1–0	—	—	—
Gwangju FC	1–0	—	—	2–0	—	2–0
Jeju SK	1–2	1–1	—	—	—	—
Suwon FC	—	1–1	0–1	1–2	—	—
Ulsan HD	—	1–1	—	0–1	1–0	—

Source: K League
Legend: Blue = home team win; Yellow = draw; Red = away team win.

Matchday 34 (25–26 October)
25 October 2025
14:00 UTC+9

Gwangju FC	1–0	FC Anyang
Park In-hyeok 20'

Gwangju World Cup Stadium, Gwangju
Attendance: 2,228
Referee: Shin Yong-jun
25 October 2025
16:30 UTC+9

Suwon FC	1–2	Jeju SK
Sabbag 45+4'		31', 53' (pen.) Yuri

Suwon Sports Complex, Suwon
Attendance: 2,510
Referee: Kim Woo-sung
26 October 2025
14:00 UTC+9

Ulsan HD	1–1	Daegu FC
Lee Chung-yong 90+6'		45+1' Kim Ju-gong

Ulsan Munsu Football Stadium, Ulsan
Attendance: 10,858
Referee: Kim Jong-hyeok

Matchday 35 (1–2 November)
1 November 2025
16:30 UTC+9

FC Anyang	3–1	Ulsan HD
Bruno Mota 39'; Lee Chang-yong 56'; Chae Hyun-woo 77'		13' Ko Seung-beom

Anyang Stadium, Anyang
Attendance: 8,206
Referee: Song Min-seok
2 November 2025
14:00 UTC+9

Gwangju FC	2–0	Jeju SK
Sin Chang-moo 79'; Friðjónsson 90+1'

Gwangju World Cup Stadium, Gwangju
Attendance: 2,485
Referee: Chae Sang-hyeop
2 November 2025
16:30 UTC+9

Suwon FC	1–1	Daegu FC
Sabbag 54'		90+9' Edgar

Suwon Sports Complex, Suwon
Attendance: 3,865
Referee: Kim Yong-woo

Matchday 36 (8–9 November)
8 November 2025
14:00 UTC+9

Jeju SK	1–2	FC Anyang
Yuri 90+4'		33', 60' Jukić

Jeju World Cup Stadium, Seogwipo, Jeju Province
Attendance: 4,161
Referee: Kim Jong-hyeok
8 November 2025
14:00 UTC+9

Daegu FC	1–0	Gwangju FC
Kim Hyeon-jun 90+4'

Daegu iM Bank Park, Daegu
Attendance: 9,372
Referee: Lee Dong-jun
9 November 2025
16:30 UTC+9

Ulsan HD	1–0	Suwon FC
Ludwigson 47'

Ulsan Munsu Football Stadium, Ulsan
Attendance: 10,187
Referee: Kim Dae-yong

Matchday 37 (22–23 November)
22 November 2025
14:00 UTC+9

FC Anyang	0–1	Suwon FC
		19' Lee Jae-won

Anyang Stadium, Anyang
Attendance: 7,835
Referee: Seol Tae-hwan
22 November 2025
16:30 UTC+9

Gwangju FC	2–0	Ulsan HD
Friðjónsson 3'; Choi Kyoung-rok 75'

Gwangju World Cup Stadium, Gwangju
Attendance: 4,033
Referee: Kim Jong-hyeok
23 November 2025
14:00 UTC+9

Jeju SK	1–1	Daegu FC
Yuri 29'		69' Geovani

Jeju World Cup Stadium, Seogwipo, Jeju Province
Attendance: 9,246
Referee: Song Min-seok

Matchday 38 (30 November)
30 November 2025
14:00 UTC+9

Daegu FC	2–2	FC Anyang
Geovani 59'; Cesinha 90+4'		2' Matheus Oliveira; 5' Lee Chang-yong

Daegu iM Bank Park, Daegu
Attendance: 12,092
Referee: Shin Yong-jun
30 November 2025
14:00 UTC+9

Suwon FC	0–1	Gwangju FC
		50' Reis

Suwon Sports Complex, Suwon
Attendance: 6,064
Referee: Song Min-seok
30 November 2025
14:00 UTC+9

Ulsan HD	0–1	Jeju SK
		89' Kim Seung-sub

Ulsan Munsu Football Stadium, Ulsan
Attendance: 11,928
Referee: Ko Hyung-jin

== Relegation play-offs ==
The tenth-placed team and the eleventh-placed team played the play-off winners and the runners-up of the K League 2, respectively, in the relegation play-offs.

The first leg between Suwon FC and Bucheon FC 1995 was postponed from 4 December to 5 December due to heavy snow.

Team 1	Agg.	Team 2	1st leg	2nd leg
Suwon Samsung Bluewings	0–3	Jeju SK	0–1	0–2
Bucheon FC 1995	4–2	Suwon FC	1–0	3–2

3 December 2025
19:00 UTC+9

Suwon Samsung Bluewings	0–1	Jeju SK
		Yuri 68' (pen.)

Suwon World Cup Stadium, Suwon
Attendance: 18,715
Referee: Shin Yong-jun
7 December 2025
14:00 UTC+9

Jeju SK	2–0	Suwon Samsung Bluewings
Kim Seung-sub 1'; Italo 45+4'

Jeju World Cup Stadium, Seogwipo, Jeju Province
Attendance: 18,912
Referee: Song Min-seok

Jeju SK won 3–0 on aggregate and therefore both clubs remain in their respective leagues.

5 December 2025
19:00 UTC+9

Bucheon FC 1995	1–0	Suwon FC
Bassani 46'

Bucheon Stadium, Bucheon
Attendance: 4,353
Referee: Kim Jong-hyeok
8 December 2025
19:00 UTC+9

Suwon FC	2–3	Bucheon FC 1995
Choi Chi-ung 83'; Sabbag 90+10' (pen.)		Bassani 15'; Kim Gyu-min 24'; Galego 46'

Suwon Sports Complex, Suwon
Attendance: 4,180
Referee: Seol Tae-hwan

Bucheon FC 1995 won 4–2 on aggregate and was promoted to K League 1, while Suwon FC was relegated to K League 2.

== Statistics ==
=== Top goalscorers ===
Rank	Player	Team	Goals
1	(Syria) Pablo Sabbag	Suwon FC	17
2	(South Korea) Jeon Jin-woo	Jeonbuk Hyundai Motors	16
3	(South Korea) Lee Ho-jae	Pohang Steelers	15
4	(South Korea) Joo Min-kyu	Daejeon Hana Citizen	14
4	(Brazil) Bruno Mota	FC Anyang	14
6	(Italy) Andrea Compagno	Jeonbuk Hyundai Motors	13
6	(Brazil) Yuri	Jeju SK	13
6	(South Korea) Lee Dong-gyeong	Gimcheon Sangmu; Ulsan HD	13
9	(Brazil) Cesinha	Daegu FC	12
9	(South Korea) Park Sang-hyeok	Gimcheon Sangmu; Gangwon FC	12

=== Top assist providers ===
Rank	Player	Team	Assists
1	(Brazil) Cesinha	Daegu FC	12
1	(South Korea) Lee Dong-gyeong	Gimcheon Sangmu; Ulsan HD	12
3	(Brazil) Anderson Oliveira	Suwon FC; FC Seoul	8
3	(South Korea) Kim Jin-su	FC Seoul	8
5	(Brazil) Yago César	FC Anyang	6
5	(South Korea) Lee Seung-won	Gimcheon Sangmu; Gangwon FC	6
5	(South Korea) Kim Jin-gyu	Jeonbuk Hyundai Motors	6
8	8 players		5

== Awards ==
=== Weekly awards ===
Round	Player of the Round	
Round	Player	Club
1	(South Korea) Joo Min-kyu	Daejeon Hana Citizen
2	(South Korea) Lee Dong-gyeong	Gimcheon Sangmu
3	(Albania) Jasir Asani	Gwangju FC
4	(South Korea) Heo Yool	Ulsan HD
5	(South Korea) Kim Da-sol	FC Anyang
6	(South Korea) Jeong Seung-won	FC Seoul
7	(Netherlands) Thomas Oude Kotte	FC Anyang
8	(South Korea) Lee Hyun-yong	Suwon FC
9	(South Korea) Jeon Jin-woo	Jeonbuk Hyundai Motors
10	(South Korea) Jeon Jin-woo	Jeonbuk Hyundai Motors
11	(South Korea) Song Bum-keun	Jeonbuk Hyundai Motors
12	(South Korea) Lee Ji-ho	Gangwon FC
13	(South Korea) Lee Ho-jae	Pohang Steelers
14	(Brazil) Anderson Oliveira	Suwon FC
15	(Brazil) Erick Farias	Ulsan HD
16	(South Korea) Jeon Jin-woo	Jeonbuk Hyundai Motors
17	(South Korea) Yu In-soo	Jeju SK
18	(Brazil) Bruno Mota	FC Anyang
19	(South Korea) Kang Sang-yoon	Jeonbuk Hyundai Motors

Round	Player of the Round	
Round	Player	Club
20	(South Korea) Mo Jae-hyeon	Gangwon FC
21	(Italy) Andrea Compagno	Jeonbuk Hyundai Motors
22	(England) Jesse Lingard	FC Seoul
23	(Brazil) Willyan	Suwon FC
24	(Syria) Pablo Sabbag	Suwon FC
25	(South Korea) Kim Jun-beom	Daejeon Hana Citizen
26	(Syria) Pablo Sabbag	Suwon FC
27	(Brazil) Jorge Teixeira	Pohang Steelers
28	(South Korea) Park Dae-hoon	Daegu FC
29	(South Korea) Lee You-hyeon	Gangwon FC
30	(South Korea) Joo Min-kyu	Daejeon Hana Citizen
31	(South Korea) Lee Dong-gyeong	Gimcheon Sangmu
32	(Japan) Masatoshi Ishida	Daejeon Hana Citizen
33	(Brazil) Bruno Mota	FC Anyang
34	(Brazil) Yuri	Jeju SK
35	(Azerbaijan) Anton Kryvotsyuk	Daejeon Hana Citizen
36	(South Korea) Kim Hyeon-jun	Daegu FC
37	(South Korea) Park Tae-jun	Gimcheon Sangmu
38	(South Korea) Seo Jin-su	Daejeon Hana Citizen

=== Monthly awards ===
Month	Player of the Month		Young Player of the Month		Goal of the Month	
Month	Player	Club	Player	Club	Player	Club
February–March	(South Korea) Joo Min-kyu	Daejeon	(South Korea) Lee Ji-ho	Gangwon	(South Korea) Jeong Seung-won	Seoul
April	(South Korea) Jeon Jin-woo	Jeonbuk	(South Korea) Shin Min-ha	Gangwon	(Brazil) Cesinha	Daegu
May	(South Korea) Jeon Jin-woo	Jeonbuk	(South Korea) Han Hyeon-seo	Pohang	(South Korea) Jeon Jin-woo	Jeonbuk
June	(Italy) Andrea Compagno	Jeonbuk	(South Korea) Lee Seung-won	Gimcheon	(South Korea) Kim Dae-won	Gangwon
July	(England) Jesse Lingard	Seoul	(South Korea) Hwang Do-yun	Seoul	(Brazil) Cesinha	Daegu
August	(Syria) Pablo Sabbag	Suwon FC	(South Korea) Lee Seung-won	Gimcheon	(South Korea) Lee Yeong-jae	Jeonbuk
September	(Brazil) Cesinha	Daegu	(South Korea) Lee Seung-won	Gimcheon	(South Korea) Jang Seong-won	Daegu
October	(Brazil) Cesinha	Daegu	(South Korea) Han Tae-hee	Daegu	(South Korea) Han Ga-ram	Anyang

Month	Manager of the Month			Save of the Month	
Month	Manager	Club	Div.	Player	Club
February–March	(South Korea) Hwang Sun-hong	Daejeon	1	(South Korea) Lee Gwang-yeon	Gangwon
April	(South Korea) Yoon Jong-hwan	Incheon	2	(South Korea) Lee Chang-geun	Daejeon
May	(Uruguay) Gus Poyet	Jeonbuk	1	(South Korea) Song Bum-keun	Jeonbuk
June	(Uruguay) Gus Poyet	Jeonbuk	1	(South Korea) Lee Gwang-yeon	Gangwon
July	(South Korea) Kim Eun-jung	Suwon FC	1	(South Korea) Song Bum-keun	Jeonbuk
August	(South Korea) Ko Jeong-woon	Gimpo	2	(South Korea) Han Tae-hee	Daegu
September	(South Korea) Jeon Kyung-jun	Seongnam	2	(South Korea) Song Bum-keun	Jeonbuk
October	(South Korea) Hwang Sun-hong	Daejeon	1	(South Korea) Song Bum-keun	Jeonbuk

=== Annual awards ===
The 2025 K League Awards was held on 1 December 2025.

Award	Winner	Club
Most Valuable Player	(South Korea) Lee Dong-gyeong	Gimcheon Sangmu; Ulsan HD
Young Player of the Year	(South Korea) Lee Seung-won	Gimcheon Sangmu; Gangwon FC
Top goalscorer	(Syria) Pablo Sabbag	Suwon FC
Top assist provider	(Brazil) Cesinha	Daegu FC
Manager of the Year	(Uruguay) Gus Poyet	Jeonbuk Hyundai Motors

Position	Best XI			
Goalkeeper	(South Korea) Song Bum-keun (Jeonbuk)			
Defenders	(South Korea) Kim Moon-hwan (Daejeon)	(South Korea) Hong Jeong-ho (Jeonbuk)	(Jordan) Yazan Al-Arab (Seoul)	(South Korea) Lee Myung-jae (Daejeon)
Midfielders	(South Korea) Kang Sang-yoon (Jeonbuk)	(South Korea) Park Jin-seob (Jeonbuk)	(South Korea) Kim Jin-gyu (Jeonbuk)	(South Korea) Song Min-kyu (Jeonbuk)
Forwards	(Syria) Pablo Sabbag (Suwon FC)		(South Korea) Lee Dong-gyeong (Gimcheon, Ulsan)	

== Attendance ==
Pos	Team	Total	High	Low	Average	Change
1	FC Seoul	440,516			23,185	−16.7%
2	Jeonbuk Hyundai Motors	368,505			18,425	+18.4%
3	Ulsan HD	274,844			14,465	−22.3%
4	Daejeon Hana Citizen	201,775			10,620	+7.8%
5	Daegu FC	188,905			10,495	−6.8%
6	Pohang Steelers	194,713			10,248	+8.0%
7	FC Anyang	144,246			7,592	+44.6%^{†}
8	Jeju SK	128,759			7,153	+12.4%
9	Gangwon FC	134,489			7,078	−22.7%
10	Suwon FC	88,708			4,669	−16.6%
11	Gwangju FC	79,417			4,180	−14.9%
12	Gimcheon Sangmu	53,680			2,684	−22.1%
	League total	2,298,557			10,081	−8.4%

Source: K League
Notes:
^{†} Teams that played previous season in K League 2.

== See also ==
- 2025 in South Korean football
- 2025 Korea Cup
- 2025 K League 2
