= Chae Hyun-woo =

South Korean footballer (born 2004)

Personal information
- Date of birth: August 19, 2004 (age 22)
- Place of birth: South Korea
- Height: 1.78 m (5 ft 10 in)
- Positions: Winger; attacking midfielder; second striker

Team information
- Current team: FC Anyang
- Number: 71

Youth career
- 2020–2022: Goal Club
- 2023–2024: Sangji University

Senior career*
Years	Team	Apps	(Gls)
2024–	FC Anyang	69	(7)

International career
2025–	South Korea U-23	2	(0)
Korean name
Hangul	채현우
RR	Chae Hyeonu
MR	Ch'ae Hyŏnu
- * Club domestic league appearances and goals as of August 3, 2026

Chae Hyun-woo (Korean: 채현우; born August 19, 2004) is a South Korean professional footballer who plays as a winger for K League 1 club FC Anyang. During his first season with the team, he made 26 appearances and scored three goals, aiding in the team's promotion from the second division.

== Early life and youth career ==
Chae Hyun-woo was born on August 19, 2004. He attended Hanam Cheonhyeon Elementary School and began developing his football skills at age ten, joining the institution's football club in third grade. The team dissolved when Chae was in fifth grade and he spent a year training with Guri Junior Football Club. During his youth career, he played for Gwangseong Middle School (Incheon United FC's youth), Goal Club U-15 Team, and Pungsaeng Middle School (Seongnam FC's youth). He later returned to Goal Club to join its U-18 Team in high school before representing Sangji University at the collegiate level.

== Senior career ==
As a second-year student at Sangji University, Chae joined K League 2 club FC Anyang in March 2024 as a free agent. He made his first appearance three weeks later as a starter in a match against Seoul E-Land FC. In May, he scored his debut goal in a 3–2 loss to Jeonnam Dragons. He made his second league goal in September, leading Anyang to a last-minute 2–1 victory against Gimpo FC. He netted his third and final goal of the season in a 2–2 draw against Gyeongnam FC. Chae made 26 appearances in the season and was credited in part for Anyang's promotion to the highest tier of the South Korean football league system for the first time in its history. At the Hana Bank K League 2024 Awards, Chae was one of the three finalists nominated by the K League Individual Awards Nomination Committee as the Young Player of the Year. He ranked third and the honor was given to Seo Jae-min of Seoul E-Land FC.

In the 2025 season, Chae scored his first K League 1 goal against Daegu FC, claiming a 1–0 victory and breaking a three-game losing streak for Anyang. Park Jun-beom of Sportsseoul commended his energetic movement and attacking play, noting improvements from the previous season. By mid-season, Chae became Anyang's top-scoring domestic player with three goals. Soon after, he began experiencing a slump due to fatigue and tactical differences between his club and the national team. He returned to form and scored his fourth goal in November. Chae has been regarded as the team's rising star.

== International career ==
In 2025, Chae was called up to the South Korea national under-23 football team. He played in two friendly matches against Australia in June and was included in the squad for the 2026 AFC U-23 Asian Cup qualifiers.

== Style of play ==
Chae is a winger capable of playing on either flank and can be deployed as an attacking midfielder or second striker. A left-footed player, he has received praise for his technical abilities and keeping composure in scoring situations. He cites Kang Yun-gu as his role model and draws inspiration from Bae Jun-ho.

== Career statistics ==
As of November 1, 2025.

Appearances and goals by club, season and competition
Club	Season	League			Cup		Continental		Other		Total	
Club	Season	Division	Apps	Goals	Apps	Goals	Apps	Goals	Apps	Goals	Apps	Goals
FC Anyang	2024	K League 2	26	3	0	0	0	0	0	0	26	3
FC Anyang	2025	K League 1	31	4	1	0	0	0	0	0	32	4
Career total			57	7	1	0	0	0	0	0	58	7
