= Park Tae-jun =

South Korean footballer

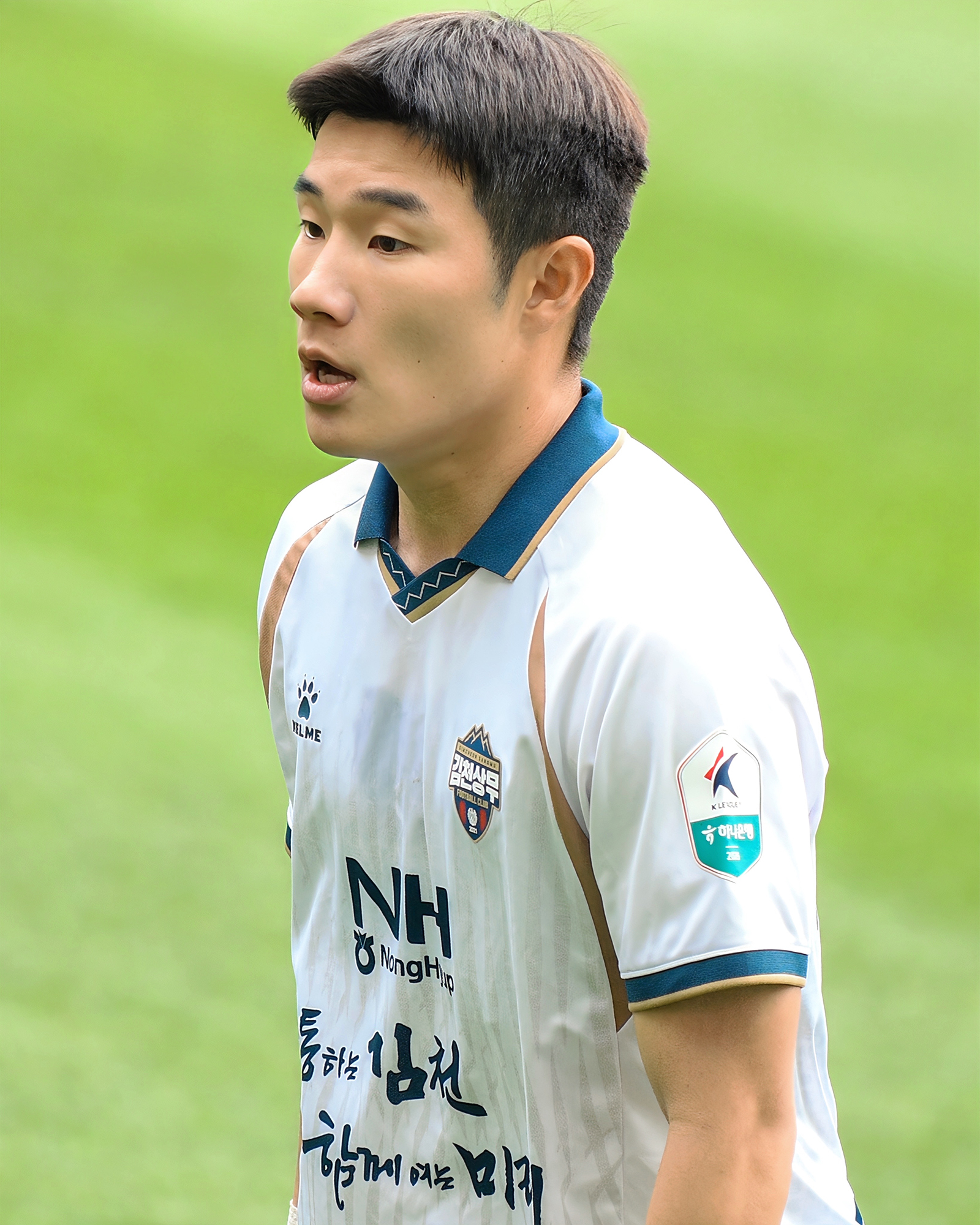
- Park in 2026

Personal information
- Full name: Park Tae-jun
- Date of birth: 19 January 1999 (age 27)
- Place of birth: Yongin, South Korea
- Height: 1.75 m (5 ft 9 in)
- Position: Midfielder

Team information
- Current team: Gimcheon Sangmu
- Number: 55

Youth career
- 2015–2017: Seongnam FC

Senior career*
Years	Team	Apps	(Gls)
2018–2023	Seongnam FC	74	(4)
2021	→ FC Anyang (loan)	19	(0)
2022	→ Seoul E-Land (loan)	12	(0)
2024–	Gwangju FC	42	(3)
2025–	→ Gimcheon Sangmu (draft)	42	(3)

International career^{‡}
2018–2019	South Korea U-20	10	(0)
2026–	South Korea	3	(0)
Medal record
Men's football
Representing South Korea
FIFA U-20 World Cup
Runner-up	2019 Poland
- * Club domestic league appearances and goals as of 7 November 2026 ‡ National team caps and goals as of 17 November 2026

Park Tae-jun (Korean: 박태준; born 19 January 1999) is a South Korean professional footballer who plays as midfielder for K League 1 club Gimcheon Sangmu and the South Korea national team.

== Career ==
Park joined K League 2 side Seongnam FC before 2018 season starts.

== Career statistics ==
=== Club ===
As of match played 7 November 2026

Appearances and goals by club, season and competition
Club	Season	League			Cup		Continental		Other		Total	
Club	Season	Division	Apps	Goals	Apps	Goals	Apps	Goals	Apps	Goals	Apps	Goals
Seongnam FC	2018	K League 2	20	1	2	0	—		—		22	1
Seongnam FC	2019	K League 1	9	0	0	0	—		—		9	0
Seongnam FC	2020	K League 1	17	2	3	0	—		—		20	2
Seongnam FC	2021	K League 1	8	0	2	0	—		—		10	0
Seongnam FC	2023	K League 2	20	1	1	0	—		—		21	0
Seongnam FC	Total		74	4	8	0	0	0	0	0	82	4
FC Anyang (loan)	2021	K League 2	19	0	0	0	—		1 (Note: Appearances in K League promotion play-offs)	0	20	0
Seoul E-Land (loan)	2022	K League 2	12	0	0	0	—		—		12	0
Gwangju FC	2024	K League 1	27	2	4	1	6 (Note: Appearances in AFC Champions League Elite)	0	—		37	3
Gwangju FC	2025	K League 1	15	1	0	0	5	0	—		20	1
Gwangju FC	Total		42	3	4	1	11	0	0	0	57	4
Gimcheon Sangmu (draft)	2025	K League 1	9	1	0	0	—		—		9	1
Gimcheon Sangmu (draft)	2026	K League 1	33	2	0	0	—		—		33	2
Gimcheon Sangmu (draft)	Total		42	3	0	0	0	0	0	0	42	3
Career total			189	10	12	1	11	0	1	0	213	11

== Honours ==
=== International ===
==== South Korea U20 ====
- FIFA U-20 World Cup runner-up: 2019
