= Isaac Osei (footballer) =

Ghanaian footballer (born 2005)

Personal information
- Date of birth: 13 September 2005 (age 21)
- Place of birth: Ghana
- Height: 1.78 m (5 ft 10 in)
- Position: Forward

Team information
- Current team: Daegu FC
- Number: 28

Youth career
- 2021–2023: Ansan FC U18

Senior career*
Years	Team	Apps	(Gls)
2025–	Daegu FC	0	(0)
- * Club domestic league appearances and goals

Isaac Osei (Korean: 아이작 오세이; born 13 September 2005) is a Ghanaian professional footballer who plays as a forward for Daegu FC.

== Early life ==
Osei was born on 13 September 2005 in Ghana and is the younger brother of Ghanaian footballer Dennis Osei. At the age of five, he moved to South Korea with his family, where he grew up in Dongducheon, South Korea and attended Sinheung Middle School and Cheongmyeong High School in South Korea.

== Career ==
As a youth player, Osei joined South Korean side Ansan FC U18, where he was regarded as a key player for the club and played in the Korea Football Association President's Cup National High School Football Tournament. Ahead of the 2025 season, he signed for South Korean side Daegu FC as the club's first homegrown foreign player.

== Style of play ==
Osei plays as a forward. South Korean newspaper Kyunghyang Shinmun wrote in 2022 that he is "not very tall, standing in the mid-to-late 170cm range, but ... shows strength in 1-on-1 ability with explosive speed".
