= Kim Ju-gong =

South Korean footballer

Personal information
- Date of birth: 23 April 1996 (age 30)
- Place of birth: South Korea
- Height: 1.80 m (5 ft 11 in)
- Position: Forward

Team information
- Current team: Daegu FC
- Number: 77

Senior career*
Years	Team	Apps	(Gls)
2019–2021	Gwangju FC	70	(10)
2022–2025	Jeju United FC	75	(11)
2025–	Daegu FC	39	(7)
- * Club domestic league appearances and goals as of 5 August 2026

- Kim Ju-gong
- Hangul: 김주공
- RR: Gim Jugong
- MR: Kim Chugong

Kim Ju-gong (Korean: 김주공; born 23 April 1996) is a South Korean football forward, who plays for Daegu FC in the K League 2, South Korea's top-tier professional football league.

== Club career ==
Born on 23 April 1996, Kim joined Gwangju FC in 2019. He made his debut for the club on 12 May 2019, playing as a substitute in a K League 2 match against Busan. He played his first match in the K League 1 on 17 May 2020, as a starter against FC Seoul.

In 2022, he moved to Jeju United FC.

== Club career statistics ==
As of 5 January 2026

Club performance			League		Cup		Continental		Total	
Season	Club	League	Apps	Goals	Apps	Goals	Apps	Goals	Apps	Goals
South Korea			League		KFA Cup		Asia		Total	
2019	Gwangju FC	K League 2	17	3	0	0	-		17	3
2020	Gwangju FC	K League 1	23	2	1	0	-		24	2
2021	Gwangju FC	K League 1	30	5	0	0	-		30	5
2022	Jeju United	K League 1	31	5	1	0	-		32	5
2023	Jeju United	K League 1	28	3	1	0	-		29	3
2024	Jeju United	K League 1	9	3	2	1	-		11	4
2025	Jeju United	K League 1	7	0	0	0	-		7	0
2025	Daegu FC	K League 1	20	3	1	0	-		20	3
Career total			158	24	6	1	-		164	25

== Honors and awards ==
=== Player ===
Gwangju FC

- League Winners (1) : 2019 K League 2
