= Oh Hu-seong =

South Korean footballer

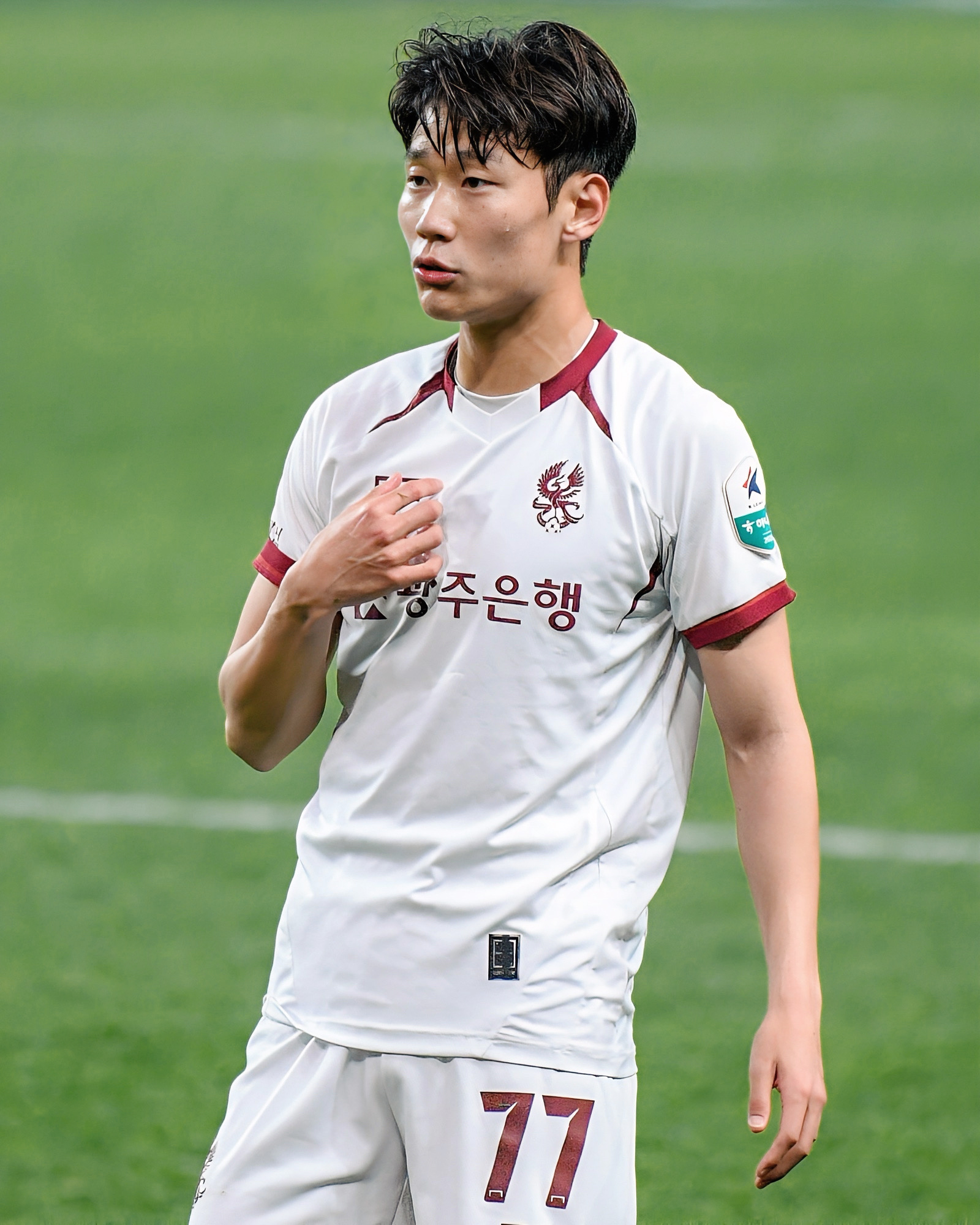
- Oh in 2025

Personal information
- Date of birth: 25 August 1999 (age 27)
- Place of birth: South Korea
- Height: 1.73 m (5 ft 8 in)
- Position: Midfielder

Team information
- Current team: Incheon United
- Number: 7

Senior career*
Years	Team	Apps	(Gls)
2018–2022	Daegu FC	45	(2)
2023–2025	Gwangju FC	48	(4)
2026–	Incheon United	8	(1)
- * Club domestic league appearances and goals as of 3 August 2026

- Oh Hu-seong
- Hangul: 오후성
- Hanja: 呉厚成
- RR: O Huseong
- MR: O Husŏng

Oh Hu-seong (Korean: 오후성; born 25 August 1999) is a South Korean footballer who plays as a midfielder for K League 1 side Incheon United.

== Club career ==
Born on 25 August 1999, Oh made his K League 1 debut for Daegu FC on 1 December 2018, coming on as a substitute against Gangwon FC. In March 2023 he transferred to Gwangju FC.

== Career statistics ==
As of 7 May 2025

Appearances and goals by club, season and competition
Club performance			League		National cup		Continental		Total	
Season	Club	League	Apps	Goals	Apps	Goals	Apps	Goals	Apps	Goals
South Korea			League		KFA Cup		AFC		Total	
2018	Daegu FC	K League 1	1	0	0	0	—		1	0
2019	Daegu FC	K League 1	8	0	0	0	0	0	8	0
2020	Daegu FC	K League 1	6	0	0	0	—		6	0
2021	Daegu FC	K League 1	22	1	0	0	4	1	26	2
2022	Daegu FC	K League 1	8	1	1	0	2	1	11	2
2023	Daegu FC	K League 1	0	0	0	0	0	0	0	0
2023	Gwangju FC	K League 1	6	0	2	0	—		8	0
2024	Gwangju FC	K League 1	9	0	4	2	9	3	22	5
2025	Gwangju FC	K League 1	11	3	0	0	—		11	3
Career total			71	5	7	2	15	5	93	12

== Honors ==
Daegu FC

- Korean FA Cup: 2018
