= Lee Jae-won (footballer, born 1997) =

South Korean footballer

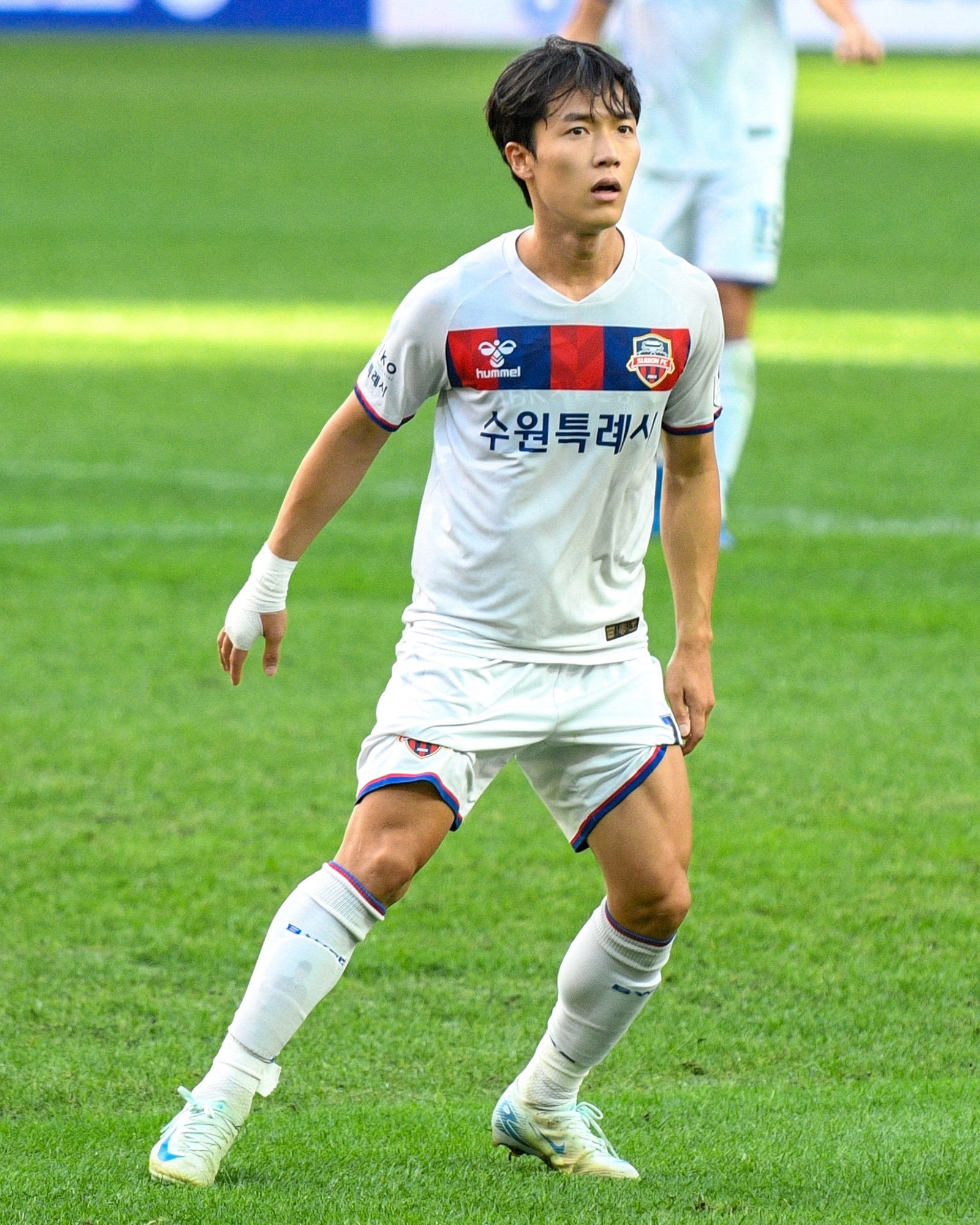
- Lee in 2024

Personal information
- Date of birth: 21 February 1997 (age 29)
- Place of birth: South Korea
- Height: 1.73 m (5 ft 8 in)
- Position: Forward

Team information
- Current team: Suwon FC
- Number: 7

Senior career*
Years	Team	Apps	(Gls)
2019–2022	Seongnam FC	74	(3)
2023	Gangwon FC (loan)	2	(0)
2024–	Suwon FC	81	(4)
- * Club domestic league appearances and goals as of 5 August 2026

- Lee Jae-won
- Hangul: 이재원
- RR: I Jaewon
- MR: I Chaewŏn

Lee Jae-won (Korean: 이재원; born 21 February 1997) is a South Korean football forward, who plays for Suwon FC in the K League 1, South Korea's top-tier professional football league.

== Club career ==
Born on 21 February 1997, Lee joined Seongnam FC in 2019. He made his debut for the club on 2 November 2019, playing in a K League 1 match against Suwon. He scored his first goals just a few weeks later, making a pair against Jeju United.

== Club career statistics ==
As of 5 January 2026

Club performance			League		Cup		Continental		Total	
Season	Club	League	Apps	Goals	Apps	Goals	Apps	Goals	Apps	Goals
South Korea			League		KFA Cup		Asia		Total	
2019	Seongnam FC	K League 1	16	2	0	0	-		16	2
2020	Seongnam FC	K League 1	16	1	3	0	-		19	1
2021	Seongnam FC	K League 1	4	0	0	0	-		4	0
2022	Seongnam FC	K League 1	19	0	0	0	-		19	0
2023	Seongnam FC	K League 1	19	0	0	0	-		19	0
2023	Gangwon FC	K League 1	2	0	0	0	-		2	0
2024	Suwon FC	K League 1	32	1	0	0	-		32	1
2025	Suwon FC	K League 1	37	2	0	0	-		37	2
Career total			145	6	3	0	-		148	6
