= Choi Sung-beom =

South Korean footballer (born 2001)

Personal information
- Date of birth: December 24, 2001 (age 24)
- Place of birth: South Korea
- Height: 1.73 m (5 ft 8 in)
- Position: Winger

Team information
- Current team: Gimpo FC (on loan from FC Anyang)
- Number: 70

Senior career*
| Years | Team | Apps | (Gls) |
| 2023– | FC Anyang | 44 | (4) |
| 2026– | → Gimpo FC (loan) | 2 | (0) |

International career
| 2022–2024 | South Korea U-23 | 0 | (0) |
Korean name
| Hangul | 최성범 |
| RR | Choe Seongbeom |
| MR | Ch'oe Sŏngbŏm |
- * Club domestic league appearances and goals as of 5 August 2026

Choi Sung-beom (Korean: 최성범; born December 24, 2001) is a South Korean professional footballer who plays as a winger for Gimpo FC, on loan from K League 1 club FC Anyang. He made his appearance in the 2023 K League 2 season and scored his debut goal at the 2023 Korean FA Cup. His first pair of league goals occurred in 2024 and, following Anyang's promotion to the top division, he scored a second pair in the 2025 season.

== Early life and youth career ==
Choi Sung-beom was born December 24, 2001. His hometown in Cheongju in North Chungcheong Province. He attended Yeongdeungpo Technical High School and later studied at Sungkyunkwan University.

== Senior career ==
In 2022, Choi signed a professional contract with K League 2 club FC Anyang. He made his first appearance in March at the opening match of the 2023 K League 2 season, a 1–0 victory against Jeonnam Dragons. Later that month, he made his debut goal in a 1–4 loss against Busan IPark at the 2023 Korean FA Cup. He made ten appearances during the season, recording one assist.

In the 2024 season, Choi provided both assists in Anyang's 2–0 victory against Chungbuk Cheongju FC in June, contributing to the club's rise to the summit of the second division standings. He accomplished the uncommon feat of attaining his first two assists of the season in a single match. By the end of the year, he scored his first two league goals.

Following Anyang's promotion to K League 1, Choi netted his first top-division goal in the 2025 season, becoming the first Anyang player to score against FC Seoul in a 2–1 defeat. He later contributed one goal in a 4–0 victory over Daegu FC, his first home-game score in the top tier league, ending a three-game losing streak for Anyang. Throughout his career, he has primarily been utilized as a substitute.

== International career ==
In 2022, Choi received a call-up to the South Korea national under-23 football team.

== Style of play ==
Choi is a winger who can be deployed as a central midfielder. He is noted for his quick speed and dribbling ability.

== Career statistics ==
As of November 1, 2025.

Appearances and goals by club, season and competition
| Club | Season | League | | | Cup | | Continental | | Other | | Total | |
| Club | Season | Division | Apps | Goals | Apps | Goals | Apps | Goals | Apps | Goals | Apps | Goals |
|---|---|---|---|---|---|---|---|---|---|---|---|---|
| FC Anyang | 2023 | K League 2 | 10 | 0 | 1 | 1 | 0 | 0 | 0 | 0 | 11 | 1 |
| FC Anyang | 2024 | K League 2 | 15 | 2 | 0 | 0 | 0 | 0 | 0 | 0 | 15 | 2 |
| FC Anyang | 2025 | K League 1 | 18 | 2 | 1 | 0 | 0 | 0 | 0 | 0 | 19 | 2 |
| Career total | | | 43 | 4 | 2 | 1 | 0 | 0 | 0 | 0 | 45 | 5 |
