= Roh Kyung-ho =

South Korean footballer (born 2000)

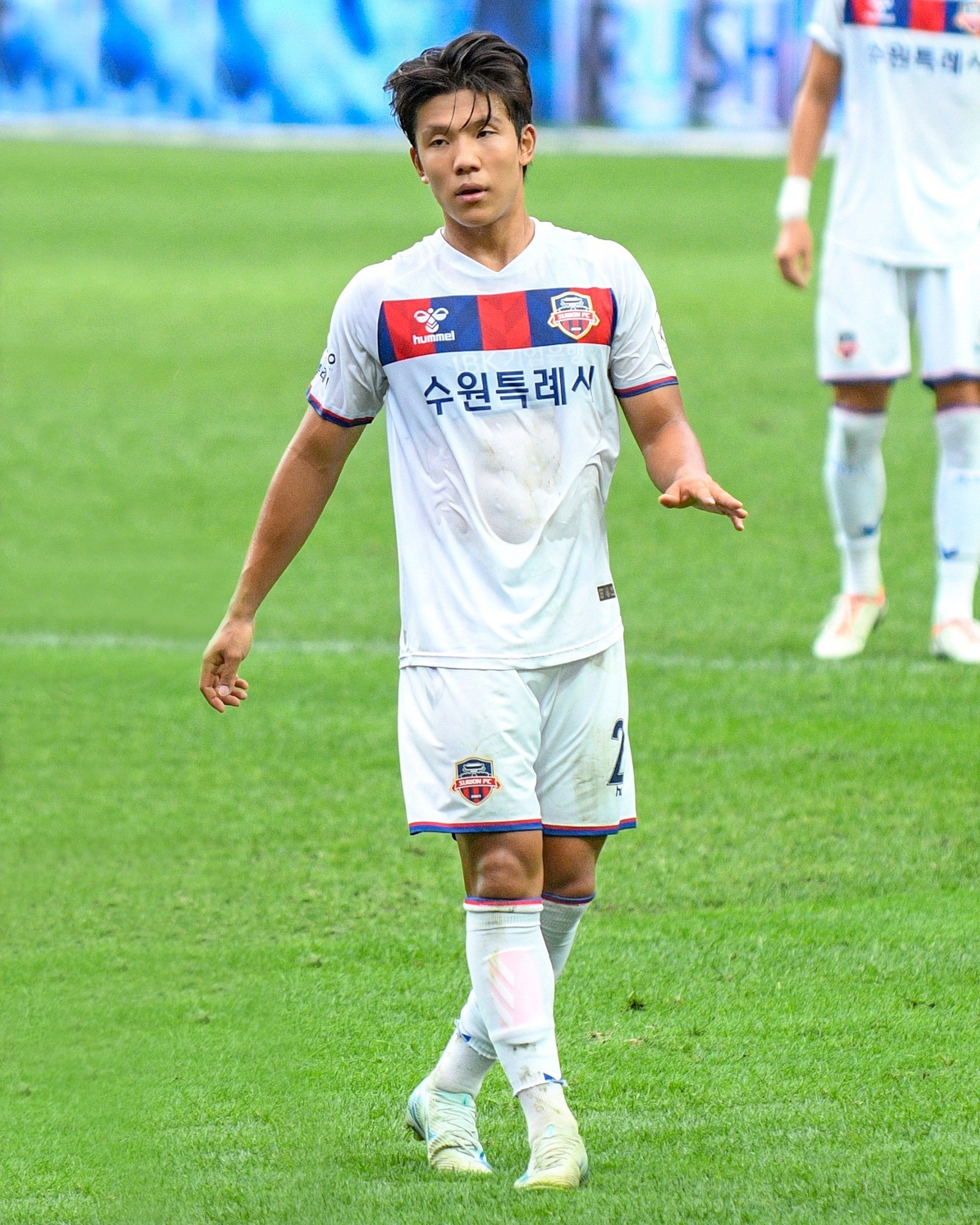

Personal information
- Date of birth: 5 July 2000 (age 26)
- Place of birth: South Korea
- Height: 1.74 m (5 ft 9 in)
- Position: Midfielder

Team information
- Current team: Gimcheon Sangmu
- Number: 53

Youth career
- 2010–2011: Hakseong FC
- 2012: Hansol Elementary School
- 2014–2015: Chung-Ang University Middle School
- 2016–2017: FC Seoul (Osan High School)
- 2018: Inchang High School
- 2019–2020: Chosun University

Senior career*
Years	Team	Apps	(Gls)
2021–2023	Pohang Steelers	5	(1)
2023–2024	→ Ansan Greeners FC	34	(4)
2024–	Suwon FC	37	(2)
2025–	→ Gimcheon Sangmu (draft)	2	(0)
- * Club domestic league appearances and goals as of 4 August 2026

- Roh Kyung-ho
- Hangul: 노경호
- Hanja: 盧京鎬
- RR: No Gyeongho
- MR: No Kyŏngho

Roh Kyung-ho (Korean: 노경호; born 5 July 2000) is a South Korean footballer currently playing as a midfielder for Gimcheon Sangmu.
