= João Victor (footballer, born 1999) =

Brazilian footballer

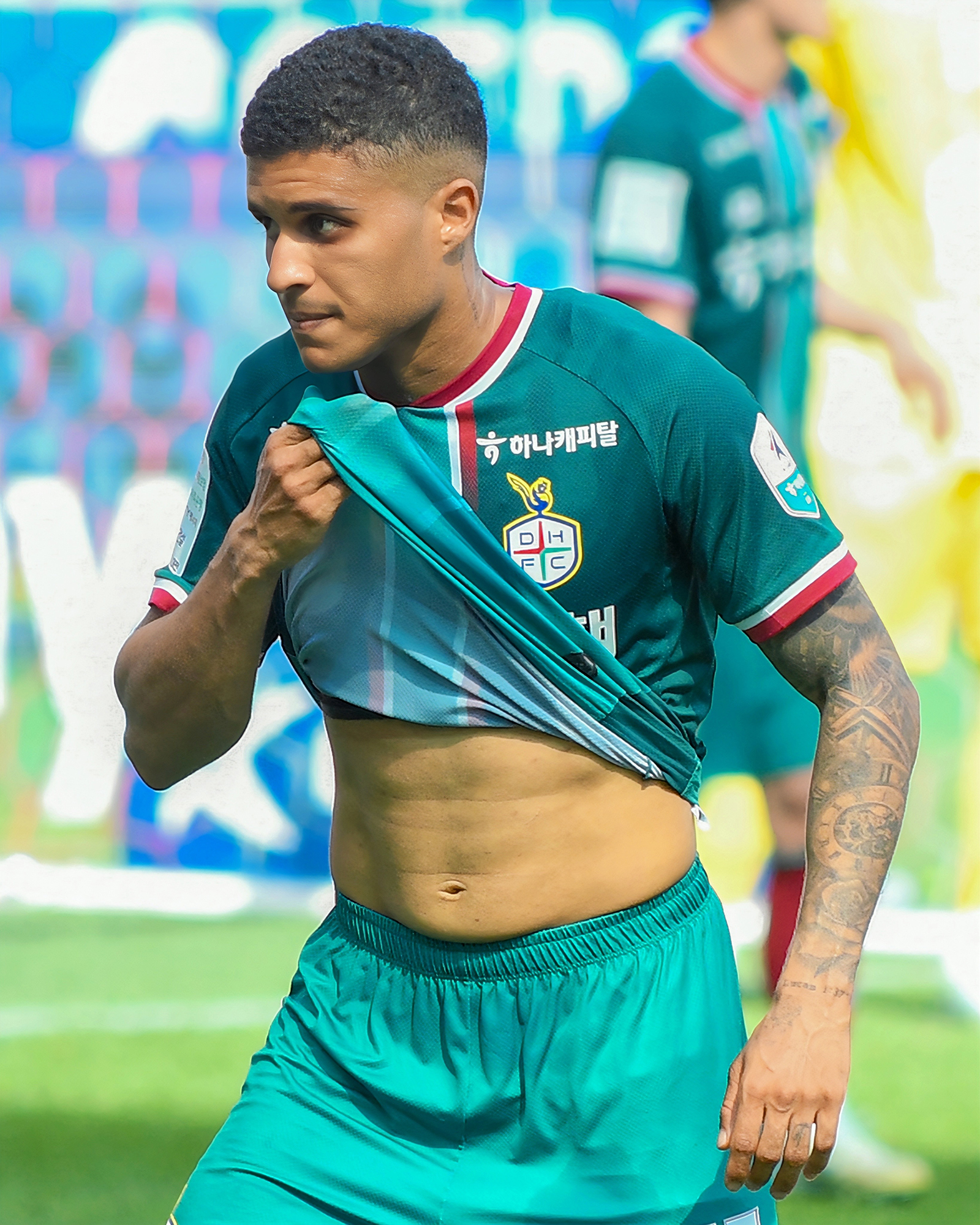
- João Victor in 2026

Personal information
- Full name: João Victor Lima Ferreira
- Date of birth: 25 February 1999 (age 27)
- Place of birth: Paulínia, Brazil
- Height: 1.77 m (5 ft 10 in)
- Position: Winger

Team information
- Current team: Daejeon Hana Citizen
- Number: 77

Youth career
- 2013−2015: SEV Hortolândia
- 2016−2017: Bragantino
- 2018−2019: Red Bull Brasil

Senior career*
| Years | Team | Apps | (Gls) |
| 2019 | Grêmio Osasco | 15 | (2) |
| 2019−2023 | Caldense | 21 | (6) |
| 2020−2021 | → Nacional (loan) | 14 | (1) |
| 2021 | → Ponte Preta (loan) | 0 | (0) |
| 2021−2022 | → Ituano (loan) | 51 | (6) |
| 2023 | → Portuguesa (loan) | 12 | (1) |
| 2023−2025 | Guarani | 71 | (6) |
| 2025 | → Tokushima (loan) | 8 | (3) |
| 2025 | → Daejeon Hana Citizen (loan) | 13 | (4) |
| 2026– | Daejeon Hana Citizen | 15 | (0) |
- * Club domestic league appearances and goals as of 3 August 2026

João Victor Lima Ferreira (born 25 February 1999) is a Brazilian professional footballer who plays as a winger for Daejeon Hana Citizen.

== Club career ==
João Victor is a youth product of Red Bull Brasil, and signed with Grêmio Osasco in 2019. He had several loans with Caldense. João Victor made his professional debut with Caldense in a 2-2 Campeonato Mineiro tie with América Mineiro on 23 January 2019. On 18 August 2020, João Victor joined on loan in the Primeira Liga.

== Career statistics ==
=== Club ===
As of match played 14 September 2024

Appearances and goals by club, season and competition
| Club | Season | League | | | State League | | National cup | | Other | | Total | |
| Club | Season | Division | Apps | Goals | Apps | Goals | Apps | Goals | Apps | Goals | Apps | Goals |
|---|---|---|---|---|---|---|---|---|---|---|---|---|
| Red Bull Brasil | 2018 | — | | | — | | — | | 1 (Note: Appearance(s) in Copa Paulista) | 0 | 1 | 0 |
| Grêmio Osasco | 2019 | — | | | 11 (Note: Appearance(s) in Campeonato Paulista Série A3) | 2 | — | | 4 | 0 | 15 | 2 |
| Caldense | 2019 | Série D | 8 | 2 | — | | — | | — | | 8 | 2 |
| Caldense | 2020 | Série D | — | | 13 (Note: Appearance(s) in Campeonato Mineiro) | 4 | — | | — | | 13 | 4 |
| Caldense | 2021 | Série D | — | | 0 | 0 | — | | — | | 0 | 0 |
| Caldense | Total | | 8 | 2 | 13 | 4 | — | | — | | 21 | 6 |
| Nacional (loan) | 2020-21 | Primeira Liga | 11 | 1 | — | | 3 | 0 | — | | 14 | 1 |
| Ponte Preta (loan) | 2021 | Série B | 0 | 0 | 0 | 0 | — | | — | | 0 | 0 |
| Ituano (loan) | 2021 | Série C | 19 | 6 | — | | — | | — | | 19 | 6 |
| Ituano (loan) | 2022 | Série B | 22 | 0 | 10 (Note: Appearance(s) in Campeonato Paulista) | 0 | — | | — | | 32 | 0 |
| Ituano (loan) | Total | | 41 | 6 | 10 | 0 | — | | — | | 51 | 6 |
| Portuguesa (loan) | 2023 | — | | | 12 | 1 | — | | — | | 12 | 1 |
| Guarani | 2023 | Série B | 33 | 3 | — | | — | | — | | 33 | 3 |
| Guarani | 2024 | Série B | 21 | 3 | 8 | 0 | — | | — | | 29 | 3 |
| Guarani | Total | | 54 | 6 | 8 | 0 | — | | — | | 62 | 6 |
| Career Total | | | 114 | 15 | 54 | 7 | 3 | 0 | 5 | 0 | 176 | 22 |

== Honours ==
Ituano

- Campeonato Brasileiro Série C: 2021
