= Geovani (footballer, born 2001) =

Brazilian footballer

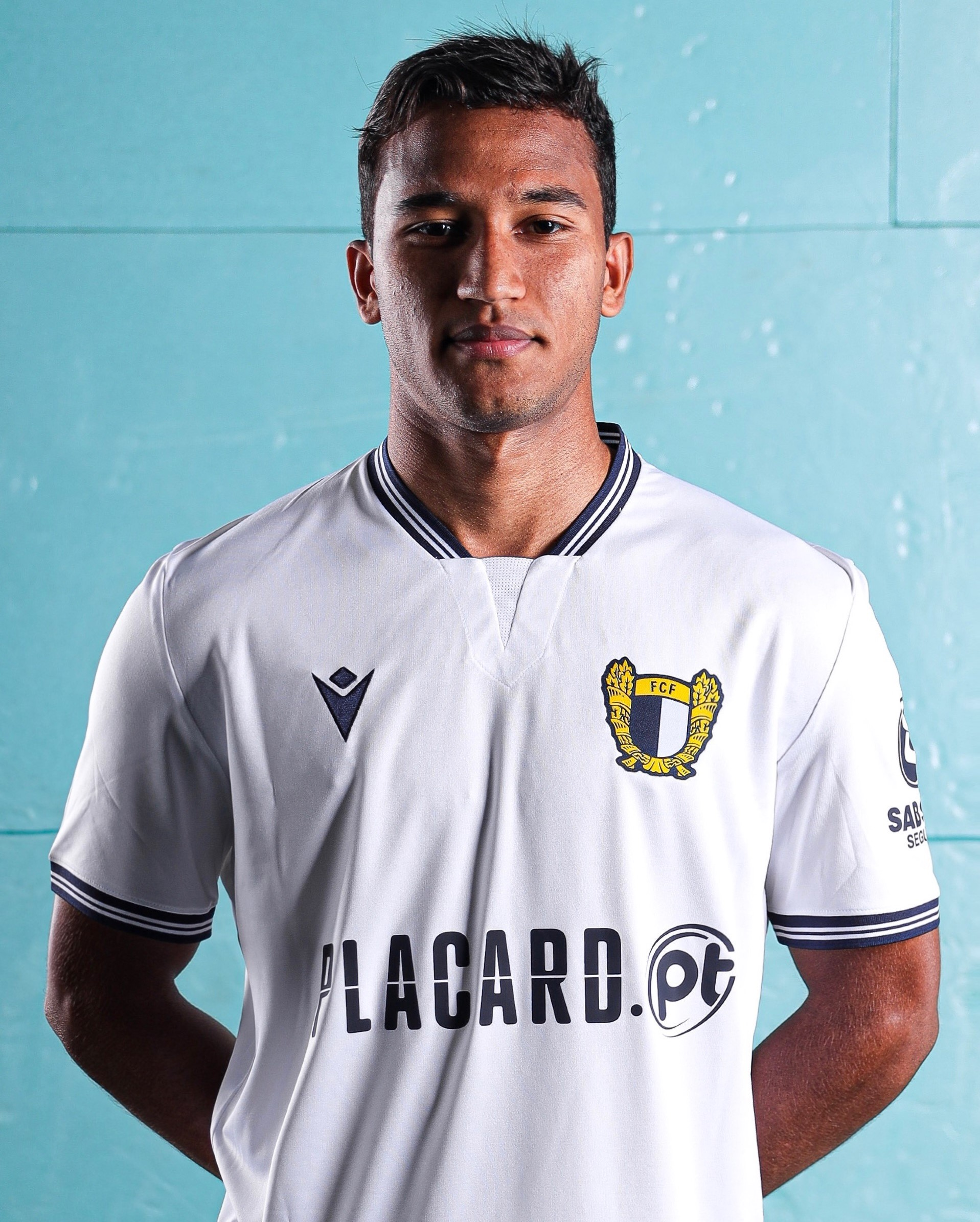

Personal information
- Full name: Geovani Reis Nascimento Júnior
- Date of birth: 15 May 2001 (age 25)
- Place of birth: Marabá, Brazil
- Height: 1.81 m (5 ft 11 in)
- Position: Midfielder

Team information
- Current team: FCI Levadia
- Number: 19

Youth career
- –2021: Barcelona Capela
- 2019–2021: → Famalicão (loan)

Senior career*
Years	Team	Apps	(Gls)
2021–2023	Barcelona Capela	0	(0)
2021–2022	→ Famalicão (loan)	2	(0)
2022–2023	→ Vitória Guimarães B (loan)	22	(1)
2023–2025	Oleksandriya	30	(2)
2025–2026	Daegu	12	(2)
2026–	FCI Levadia	10	(4)
- * Club domestic league appearances and goals as of 17 November 2026

Geovani Reis Nascimento Júnior (born 15 May 2001), known as just Geovani is a Brazilian professional footballer who plays as a midfielder for FCI Levadia.

== Career ==
Geovani is a youth product of Famalicão having joined their youth academy in 2019, and after playing with their reserves was promoted to the senior team in 2021. He made his professional debut with Famalicão in a 1–0 Taça da Liga win over Estoril on 1 August 2021.
