= Caio Marcelo =

Brazilian footballer (born 1998)

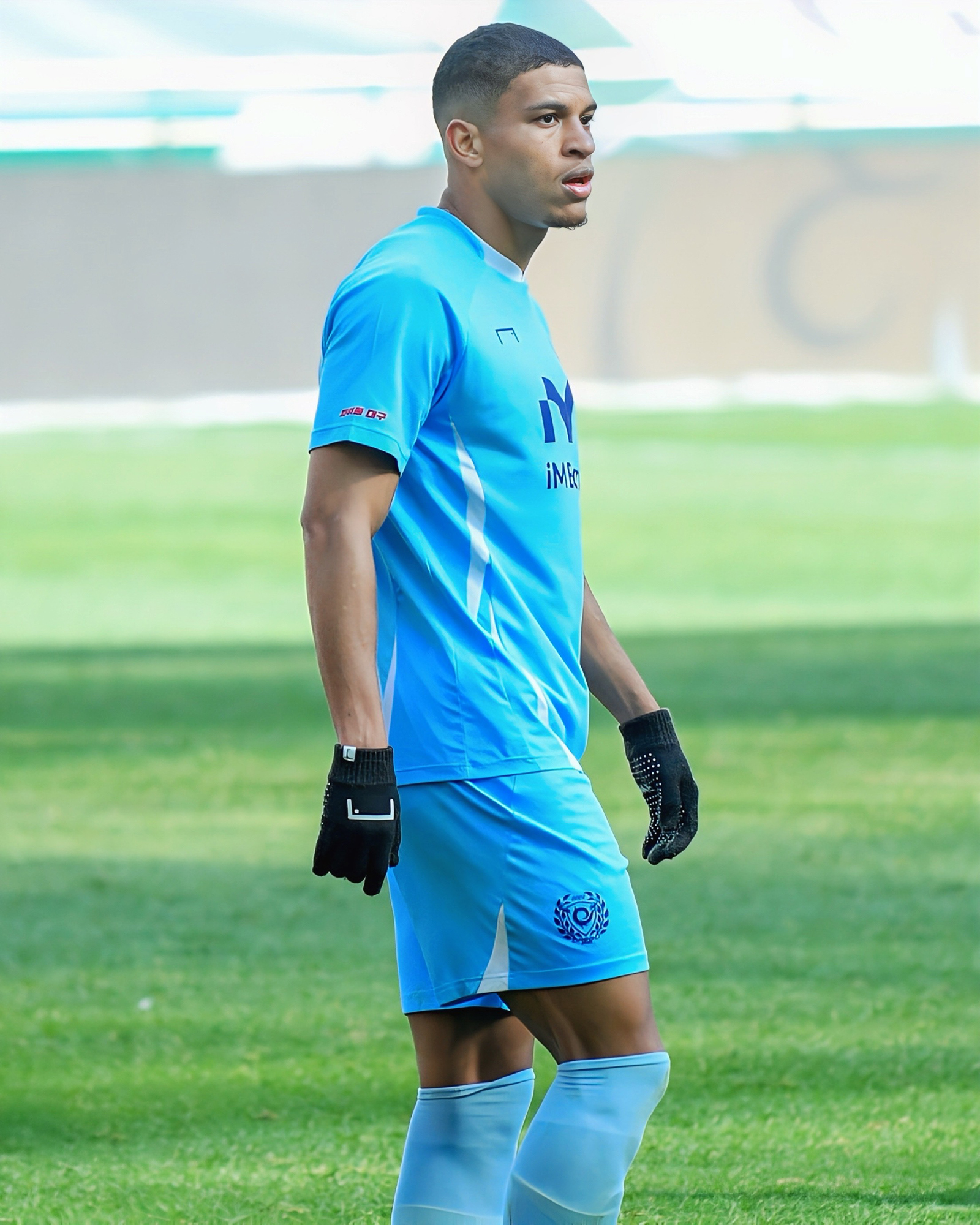
- Marcelo with Daegu FC in 2025

Personal information
- Full name: Caio Marcelo Pinheiro da Silva
- Date of birth: 14 March 1998 (age 28)
- Place of birth: Rio de Janeiro, Brazil
- Height: 1.91 m (6 ft 3 in)
- Position: Centre-back

Team information
- Current team: Vila Nova
- Number: 38

Youth career
- Botafogo
- Cruzeiro
- 2013–2018: Nova Iguaçu
- 2017–2018: → Vasco da Gama (loan)

Senior career*
Years	Team	Apps	(Gls)
2018–2019	Orlando Pirates	5	(1)
2019–2020	Casa Pia	12	(0)
2020–2021	Águeda	18	(1)
2021–2023	Trofense	28	(0)
2023–2024	Hwaseong	31	(3)
2024–2025	Daegu	48	(6)
2026–	Vila Nova	4	(6)
- * Club domestic league appearances and goals as of 14 April 2026

Caio Marcelo Pinheiro da Silva (born 14 March 1998) is a Brazilian professional footballer who plays as a centre-back for Vila Nova.

== Career ==
Marcelo had youth stints with Botafogo and Cruzeiro. He began playing for Nova Iguaçu's academy in 2013, remaining for five years whilst scoring five goals in ninety appearances. Campeonato Brasileiro Série A side Vasco da Gama loaned Marcelo in July 2017, as the defender would subsequently feature for their youth ranks. On 3 September 2018, following successful trials, Marcelo joined Orlando Pirates of the South African Premier Division. He was an unused substitute three times up until October, with his professional debut arriving on 3 October during a tie with Golden Arrows. His first goal came a month later versus Polokwane City.

Marcelo left Orlando Pirates on 9 July 2019, after the two parties mutually agreed to part ways, with the South African outfit citing homesickness as the reason. On 16 July, Marcelo moved to Portuguese LigaPro team Casa Pia. He made fifteen appearances in league and cup across 2019–20, though wouldn't feature in the early stages of 2020–21 and would depart in October 2020 to Campeonato de Portugal team Águeda. He debuted in a win over Espinho on 23 October, before scoring in his fifth appearance against Valadares Gaia on 5 December.

== Career statistics ==
As of 16 March 2021.

Club statistics
Club	Season	League			Cup		League Cup		Continental		Other		Total	
Club	Season	Division	Apps	Goals	Apps	Goals	Apps	Goals	Apps	Goals	Apps	Goals	Apps	Goals
Orlando Pirates	2018–19	Premier Division	5	1	0	0	2	0	1 (Note: Appearance(s) in the CAF Champions League)	0	0	0	8	1
Casa Pia	2019–20	LigaPro	12	0	0	0	3	0	—		0	0	15	0
Casa Pia	2020–21	LigaPro	0	0	0	0	0	0	—		0	0	0	0
Casa Pia	Total		12	0	0	0	3	0	—		0	0	15	0
Águeda	2020–21	Campeonato de Portugal	16	1	0	0	0	0	—		0	0	16	1
Career total			33	2	0	0	5	0	1	0	0	0	39	2
