= Kim Jung-soo (footballer) =

South Korean footballer (born 1975)

Personal information
- Date of birth: 17 January 1975 (age 51)
- Place of birth: South Korea
- Position: Centre-back

Team information
- Current team: South Korea U23 (assistant manager)

Youth career
- 1993–1996: Chung-Ang University

Senior career*
Years	Team	Apps	(Gls)
1997–2003	Daejeon Citizen	124	(3)
2004–2005	Jeju United FC	34	(0)
2008–2009	Yongin Citizen FC		

International career
1997	South Korea	2	(0)

Managerial career
- 2017–2019: South Korea U17
- 2019–: South Korea U20
- * Club domestic league appearances and goals

Kim Jung-soo (Korean: 김정수, born 17 January 1975) is a South Korean football coach and former player. He is currently the assistant manager of South Korea U23.

== Club career ==
He was a founding player of Daejeon Citizen in 1997.

== Managerial career ==
He was the head coach of South Korea U17 at the 2019 FIFA U-17 World Cup.
