= 2026 Ulsan HD FC season =

Ulsan HD
2026 season
- Owner: HD Hyundai Heavy Industries
- Chairman: Chung Mong-joon
- Stadium: Ulsan Munsu Football Stadium
Home colours	Away colours

The 2026 season is Ulsan HD FC's 43rd season in the K League 1, and the 2nd season under the new name after rebranding from Ulsan Hyundai FC. Over the course of the season, the club participated in the 2026 K League 1, and the 2026 Korean FA Cup.

== Players ==
No.	Name	Nationality	Date of birth (age)	Previous club	Contract since	Contract end
Goalkeepers
1	Choi Joo-ho	(South Korea)	12 January 2008 (age 18)	(South Korea) Hyundai High School	2026	
13	Ryu Sung-min	(South Korea)	3 January 2003 (age 23)	(South Korea) Chung-Ang University	2025	
21	Jo Hyeon-woo	(South Korea)	25 September 1991 (age 35)	(South Korea) Daegu	2020	
23	Moon Jung-in	(South Korea)	16 March 1998 (age 28)	(South Korea) Seoul E-Land	2025	
31	Hwang Byeong-geun	(South Korea)	14 June 1994 (age 32)	(South Korea) FC Anyang	2026	
Defenders
2	Yoon Jong-gyu	(South Korea)	20 March 1998 (age 28)	(South Korea) FC Seoul	2025	
3	Jung Seong-bin	(South Korea)	12 May 2007 (age 19)	(Austria) FC Liefering	2025	
4	Seo Myung-gwan	(South Korea)	23 November 2002 (age 23)	(South Korea) Bucheon 1995	2025	
15	Jung Seung-hyun	(South Korea)	3 April 1994 (age 32)	(United Arab Emirates) Al Wasl	2025	
17	Kang Sang-woo	(South Korea)	7 October 1993 (age 33)	(South Korea) FC Seoul	2025	
19	Kim Young-gwon	(South Korea)	27 February 1990 (age 36)	(Japan) Gamba Osaka	2022	
26	Cho Hyun-taek	(South Korea)	2 August 2001 (age 25)	(South Korea) Gimcheon Sangmu	2020	
28	Lee Jae-ik	(South Korea)	21 May 1999 (age 27)	(South Korea) Jeonbuk Hyundai Motors	2025	
33	Jang Si-young	(South Korea)	31 March 2002 (age 24)	(South Korea) Bucheon 1995	2023	
38	Park Yong-woo	(South Korea)	10 September 1993 (age 33)	(United Arab Emirates) Al Ain	2026	
55	Thomas Oude Kotte	(Netherlands)	20 March 1996 (age 30)	(South Korea) FC Anyang	2026	
66	Miłosz Trojak	(Poland)	5 May 1994 (age 32)	(Poland) Korona Kielce	2025	
77	Sim Sang-min	(South Korea)	21 May 1993 (age 33)	(South Korea) Gwangju	2024	2026
96	Choi Seok-hyeon	(South Korea)	13 January 2003 (age 23)	(South Korea) Chungbuk Cheongju	2023	
Midfielders
6	Darijan Bojanić	(Sweden)	28 December 1994 (age 31)	(Sweden) Hammarby	2023	
10	Lee Dong-gyeong	(South Korea)	20 September 1997 (age 29)	(South Korea) Gimcheon Sangmu	2018	
14	Lee Jin-hyun	(South Korea)	26 August 1997 (age 29)	(Poland) Puszcza Niepołomice	2025	
16	Park Woo-jin	(South Korea)	16 April 2003 (age 23)	(South Korea) Suwon Samsung Bluewings	2026	2027
24	Lee Kyu-seong	(South Korea)	10 May 1994 (age 32)	(South Korea) Suwon Samsung Bluewings	2021	
27	Pedrinho	(Brazil)	20 February 2002 (age 24)	(South Korea) Jeju	2026	
43	Jo Min-seo	(South Korea)	25 May 2005 (age 21)	(South Korea) Dankook University	2026	
72	Baek In-woo	(South Korea)	29 November 2006 (age 19)	(South Korea) Yongin Deokyoung	2025	
Forwards
8	Lee Hui-gyun	(South Korea)	29 April 1998 (age 28)	(South Korea) Gwangju	2024	
9	Marcão	(Brazil)	17 June 1994 (age 32)	(Saudi Arabia) Al-Ahli	2025	
11	Erick Farias	(Brazil)	3 January 1997 (age 29)	(Brazil) Juventude	2025	
20	Jeong Jae-sang	(South Korea)	25 May 2002 (age 24)	(South Korea) Daegu	2026	
91	Benji Michel	(United States)	23 October 1997 (age 29)	(Finland) HJK	2026	
99	Yago Cariello	(Brazil)	27 July 1999 (age 27)	(China) Zhejiang FC	2024	
Players who left on loan during mid-season
3	Kang Min-woo	(South Korea)	2 March 2006 (age 20)	(South Korea) Ulsan HD U18	2024	
18	Heo Yool	(South Korea)	12 April 2001 (age 25)	(South Korea) Gwangju		
22	Lee Min-hyuk	(South Korea)	19 January 2002 (age 24)	(South Korea) Suwon Samsung Bluewings		
26	Park Min-seo	(South Korea)	15 September 2000 (age 26)	(South Korea) Seoul E-Land		
30	Yoon Jae-seok	(South Korea)	22 October 2003 (age 23)	(South Korea) Jeonnam Dragons		
37	Moon Hyeon-ho	(South Korea)	13 May 2003 (age 23)	(South Korea) Chungnam Asan		
	Kim Beom-hwan	(South Korea)	12 September 2006 (age 20)	(South Korea) Korea University		
Players who left permanently during mid-season

== Backroom staff ==
=== Coaching staff ===
- Manager: (South Korea) Kim Hyun-seok
- Head coach: (South Korea) Kwak Tae-hwi
- Coach: (South Korea) Lee Jung-youl, (South Korea) Lee Yong
- Tactical coach: (Japan) Susumu Watanabe
- Goalkeeper coach: (South Korea) Kim Yong-dae
- Fitness coach: (Japan) Seigo Ikeda

== Transfers ==
=== Pre-season ===
==== In ====
Transfers in

Date	Position	Player	Transferred from	Ref
Permanent Transfer
31 December 2025	DF	(South Korea) Hong Jae-seok	(South Korea) Busan IPark	End of loan
1 January 2026	DF	(South Korea) Lee Jae-hyung	(South Korea) Hyundai High School	Free
3 January 2026	DF	(South Korea) Sim Sang-min	(South Korea) Gwangju FC	End of loan
3 January 2026	DF	(South Korea) Choi Kang-min	(South Korea) Chungbuk Cheongju	End of loan
3 January 2026	MF	(South Korea) Lee Kyu-seong	(South Korea) Suwon Samsung Bluewings	End of loan
3 January 2026	FW	(South Korea) Jang Si-young	(South Korea) Bucheon	End of loan
3 January 2026	FW	(Brazil) Yago Cariello	(China) Zhejiang FC	End of loan
4 January 2026	MF	(South Korea) Jo Min-seo	(South Korea) Dankook University	Free
6 January 2026	GK	(South Korea) Choi Joo-ho	(South Korea) Hyundai High School	Free
8 January 2026	FW	(South Korea) Kim Beom-hwan	(South Korea) Korea University	Free (Note: Kim Beom-hwan moves on loan to Hwaseong after signing.)
11 January 2026	FW	(Brazil) Pedrinho	(South Korea) Jeju SK	Free
12 February 2026	DF	(South Korea) Jeong Jae-sang	(South Korea) Daegu	Swop for Choi Kang-min
14 February 2026	FW	(United States) Benji Michel	(Finland) HJK	Free
21 February 2026	MF	(South Korea) Lee Min-hyuk	(South Korea) Suwon Samsung Bluewings	Swop for Ko Seung-beom
21 February 2026	MF	(South Korea) Park Woo-jin	(South Korea) Suwon Samsung Bluewings	Swop for Ko Seung-beom
Loan Transfer

==== Out ====
Transfers out

Date	Position	Player	Transferred to	Ref
Permanent Transfer
2 January 2026	MF	(Sweden) Gustav Ludwigson	(South Korea) Daejeon Hana Citizen	Free
2 January 2026	FW	(South Korea) Um Won-sang	(South Korea) Daejeon Hana Citizen	Free
3 December 2025	MF	(South Korea) Kim Min-hyeok	(South Korea) Busan IPark	Free
3 December 2025	MF	(South Korea) Jung Woo-young	(Japan) Kataller Toyama	Free
6 January 2026	GK	(South Korea) Kim Se-hyeong	(South Korea) Dangjin Citizen	Free
10 January 2026	DF	(South Korea) Hong Jae-seok	(South Korea) FC Anyang	Free
25 January 2026	MF	(South Korea) Lee Chung-yong	(South Korea) Incheon United	Free
2 February 2026	MF	(Venezuela) (Spain) Matías Lacava	(Portugal) Vizela	Free
12 February 2026	DF	(South Korea) Choi Kang-min	(South Korea) Daegu	Swop for Jeong Jae-sang
21 February 2026	MF	(South Korea) Ko Seung-beom	(South Korea) Suwon Samsung Bluewings	Swop for Lee Min-hyuk & Park Woo-jin
Loan Transfer
7 April 2025	GK	(South Korea) Moon Hyeon-ho	(South Korea) Gimcheon Sangmu FC	Military Service
5 June 2025	DF	(South Korea) Jung Seong-bin	(Austria) FC Liefering	Loan till 30 June 2026
23 August 2025	DF	(South Korea) Kang Min-woo	(Belgium) Genk	Season loan (Note: Min-woo will move on loan before having the contract permanent after loan completion.)
15 December 2025	DF	(South Korea) Park Min-seo	(South Korea) Gimcheon Sangmu FC	Military Service
15 December 2025	MF	(South Korea) Yoon Jae-seok	(South Korea) Gimcheon Sangmu FC	Military Service
8 January 2026	FW	(South Korea) Kim Beom-hwan	(South Korea) Hwaseong	Season loan

=== Mid-season ===
==== In ====
Transfers in

Date	Position	Player	Transferred from	Ref
Permanent Transfer
14 June 2026	DF	(Netherlands) Thomas Oude Kotte	(South Korea) FC Anyang	Undisclosed
1 July 2026	DF	(South Korea) Kang Min-woo	(Belgium) Genk	End of loan
3 July 2026	DF	(South Korea) Jung Seong-bin	(Austria) FC Liefering	End of loan
8 July 2026	GK	(South Korea) Hwang Byeong-geun	(South Korea) FC Anyang	Free
18 August 2026	DF	(South Korea) Park Yong-woo	(United Arab Emirates) Al Ain	Free
Loan Transfer

==== Out ====
Transfers out

Date	Position	Player	Transferred to	Ref
Permanent Transfer
Loan Transfer
1 July 2026	DF	(South Korea) Kang Min-woo	(Japan) Kataller Toyama	Season loan
3 August 2026	FW	(South Korea) Heo Yool	(South Korea) Gimcheon Sangmu FC	Military Service
19 August 2026	MF	(South Korea) Lee Min-hyuk	(South Korea) Incheon United	Season loan

== Friendly matches ==
Win Draw Loss

=== Tour of UAE (6 Jan - 26 Jan) ===
20 January 2025	Shanghai Shenhua (China)	1–2	(South Korea) Ulsan HD	Dubai, UAE
	Liu Chengyu

== Competitions ==
=== K League 1 ===
==== Matches ====
As usual, the league season is played over 38 matches. After 33 league matches between the 12 participating teams, the teams are split into the final round (top 6 teams) and relegation round (bottom 6 teams).

28 February 2026 1	Ulsan HD	3–1	Gangwon	Ulsan
	Yago Cariello 19', 45+3'; Lee Heui-kyun 86'; Lee Gyu-sung (yellow card) 23'; Choi Seok-Hyun (yellow card) 90+4'	Report	Abdallah Khalaihal 90+4'; Marko Tuci (yellow card) 35'; Seo Min-woo (yellow card) 58'; Mo Jae-hyeon (yellow card) 90+3'	Stadium: Ulsan Munsu Football Stadium; Attendance: 11,036; Referee: Park Byung jin

15 April 2026 2 (Rescheduled)	Ulsan HD	1–4	FC Seoul	Ulsan
	Marcao 67'; Choi Seok-Hyun (yellow card) 11'	Report	Leonardo Acevedo 3'; Benji Michel 10' (o.g.); Song Min-kyu 30', 53'; Park Su-il (yellow card) 14'; Juan Antonio Ros (yellow card) 30'; Lee Han-do (yellow card) 70'; Gu Sung-yun (yellow card) 85'; Patryk Klimala (yellow card) 90+4'	Stadium: Ulsan Munsu Football Stadium; Attendance: 6,567; Referee: Shin Yong-jun

15 March 2026 3	Bucheon	1–2	Ulsan HD	Bucheon
	Kim Min-jun 10'; Thiaguinho Santos (yellow card) 14'; John Franky Montano Sinisterra (yellow card) 34'	Report	Yago Cariello 40'; Lee Dong-gyeong 70' (yellow card) 80'	Stadium: Bucheon Stadium; Attendance: 8,558; Referee: Kim Dae-yong

18 March 2026 4	Jeju SK	0–2	Ulsan HD	Seogwipo
	Kim Jae-woo (yellow card) 45'; Gytis Paulauskas (yellow card) 66'	Report	Jeong Seung-Hyeon 48'; Yago Cariello 64'; Lee Heui-kyun (yellow card) 54'; Lee Min-Hyeok (yellow card) 88'	Stadium: Jeju World Cup Stadium; Attendance: 2,832; Referee: Song Min-seok

22 March 2026 5	Ulsan HD	0–0	Gimcheon Sangmu	Ulsan
		Report	Kim Tae-hwan (yellow card) 38'; Lee Gun-hee (yellow card) 65'; Lee Jung-taek (yellow card) 83'; Park Se-jin (yellow card) 86'	Stadium: Ulsan Munsu Football Stadium; Attendance: 11,655; Referee: Park Byeong-jing

4 April 2026 6	Jeonbuk Hyundai Motors	2–0	Ulsan HD	Jeonju
	Cho Wi-je 10'; Lee Seung-woo 90+4'; Kim Tae hwan (yellow card) 57'; Kim Yeong-bin (yellow card) 89'	Report	Lee Jae-Ik (yellow card) 57'; Lee Gyu-sung (yellow card) 71'; Cho Hyun taek (yellow card) 90'	Stadium: Jeonju World Cup Stadium; Attendance: 20,532; Referee: Kim Jong-hyeok

11 April 2026 7	Incheon United	1–2	Ulsan HD	Incheon
	Stefan Mugosa 72' (yellow card) 90+7'	Report	Yago Cariello 24'; Marcao 90+6'; Benji Michel (yellow card) 83'; Milosz Trojak (yellow card) 90+3'	Stadium: Incheon Football Stadium; Attendance: 11,358; Referee: Song Min-seok

19 April 2026 8	Ulsan HD	5–1	Gwangju	Ulsan
	Jung Seung-hyeon 20'; Marcao 28', 58' (pen.); Han Yool 90'; Lee Dong-gyeong 90+4' (pen.); Sim Sang-min (yellow card) 68'; Lee Gyu-sung (yellow card) 83'	Report	Shin Chang-moo 22'; Ju Se-jong (yellow card) 40'; Kim Yong-hyuk (yellow card) 60'; Park Sung-hyun (yellow card) 85'	Stadium: Ulsan Munsu Football Stadium; Attendance: 8,962; Referee: Ko Hyung-jin

22 April 2025 9	FC Anyang	1–1	Ulsan HD	Anyang
	Airton 4'	Report	Han Yool 83'; Jung Seung-hyeon (yellow card) 34'	Stadium: Anyang Stadium; Attendance: 5,076; Referee: Kim Dae-yong

26 April 2026 10	Ulsan HD	1–4	Daejeon Hana Citizen	Ulsan
	Lee Dong-gyeong 90' (yellow card) 37'; Kang Sang-Woo (yellow card) 32'; Cho Hyun-taek (yellow card) 90+3'	Report	Gustav Ludwigson 16'; Jeong Jae-hee 43'; Diogo de Oliveira 45+2'; Masatoshi Ishida 53'; Cho Sung-gwon (yellow card) 65'	Stadium: Ulsan Munsu Football Stadium; Attendance: 14,618; Referee: Seol Tae-hwan

2 May 2026 11	Ulsan HD	0–1	Pohang Steelers	Ulsan
		Report	Cho Sang-hyeok 90+5' (yellow card) 90+8'	Stadium: Ulsan Munsu Football Stadium; Attendance: 16,413; Referee: Kim Jong-hyeok

5 May 2026 12	Gimcheon Sangmu	1–2	Ulsan HD	Gimcheon
	Lee Gun-hee 75' (yellow card) 90+5'	Report	Marcao 40'; Yago Cariello 62'	Stadium: Gimcheon Stadium; Attendance: 3,603; Referee: Choi Hyun-jae

10 May 2026 13	Ulsan HD	1–0	Bucheon	Ulsan
	Lee Dong-gyeong 24'	Report	Vitor Gabriel (yellow card) 90+7'	Stadium: Ulsan Munsu Football Stadium; Attendance: 14,931; Referee: Kim Woo-sung

13 May 2026 14	Ulsan HD	2–1	Jeju	Ulsan
	Lee Dong-gyeong 17'; Milosz Trojak 32'	Report	Emerson Negueba 88'; Kim Jae-woo (yellow card) 31'	Stadium: Ulsan Munsu Football Stadium; Attendance: 5,087; Referee: Kim Dae-yong

17 May 2026 15	Gangwon	2–0	Ulsan HD	Gangneung
	Choi Byeong-chan 20'; Marko Tuci 44'; Song Jun-seok (yellow card) 64'; Kim Dae-won (yellow card) 84'	Report	Milosz Trojak (yellow card) 40'; Jeong Jae-sang (yellow card) 77' (yellow-red card) 90+1'	Stadium: Gangneung Stadium; Attendance: 8,327; Referee: Ko Hyung-jin

5 July 2025 16	Gwangju	1–1	Ulsan HD	Gwangju
	Moon Min-seo 64'; Je-ho Yu (yellow card) 4'	Report	Yago Cariello 54'	Stadium: Gwangju Football Stadium; Attendance: 3,516; Referee: Seol Tae-hwan

11 July 2025 17	Ulsan HD	1–3	Jeonbuk Hyundai Motors	Ulsan
	Yago Cariello 89'; Darijan Bojanic (yellow card) 53'	Report	Kim Jin-gyu 31' (yellow card) 63'; Lee Seung-woo 60' (yellow card) 48'; Kim Ye-geon 79'; Lee Dong-Jun (yellow card) 64'; Oberdan (yellow card) 90+4'	Stadium: Ulsan Munsu Football Stadium; Attendance: 20,173; Referee: Kim Dae-yong

18 July 2025 18	Daejeon Hana Citizen	2–2	Ulsan HD	Daejeon
	Ha Chang-rae 11'; Seo Jin-su 24'; Lee Myung-jae (yellow card) 77'	Report	Choi Seok-Hyun 44', 67'	Stadium: Daejeon World Cup Stadium; Attendance: 7,165; Referee: Choi Cheol-jun

21 July 2025 19	Ulsan HD	1–2	Incheon United	Ulsan
	Lee Dong-gyeong 42'; Lee Min-hyuk (yellow card) 77'	Report	Morgan James Ferrier 40'; Stefan Mugosa 90+4' (pen.) (yellow card) 90+4'; Lee Myeong-Ju (yellow card) 64'; Choi Seung-gu (yellow card) 81'; Jeong Chi-In (yellow card) 90+14'	Stadium: Ulsan Munsu Football Stadium; Attendance: 5,083; Referee: Song Min-seok

26 July 2025 20	FC Seoul	1–3	Ulsan HD	Seoul
	Jeong Seung-won 61'; Patryk Klimala (yellow card) 82'	Report	Erik Farias 5'; Lee Dong-gyeong 13'; Yago Cariello 90+8' (yellow card) 90+9'; Thomas Oude Kotte (yellow card) 57'	Stadium: Seoul World Cup Stadium; Attendance: 24,343; Referee: Seol Tae-hwan

2 August 2026 21	Ulsan HD	3–1	FC Anyang	Ulsan
	Yago Cariello 63' (pen.); Lee Dong-gyeong 72', 77'	Report	Matheus Oliveira Santos 56' (penalty missed) 90+5; Kim Jung-hyun (yellow card) 67'	Stadium: Ulsan Munsu Football Stadium; Attendance: 8,072; Referee: Park Byeong-jing

8 August 2026 22	Pohang Steelers	0–2	Ulsan HD	Pohang
	Jin Si-woo (yellow card) 36'	Report	Seo Myung-Guan 66'; Yago Cariello 67'; Jo Hyeon-woo (yellow card) 90+4'	Stadium: Pohang Steel Yard; Attendance: 11,453; Referee: Kim Dong-jun

16 August 2026 23	Ulsan HD	2–3	Gangwon	Ulsan
	Kim Young-gwon 15'; Jung Seung-hyun 55'; Yago Cariello (yellow card) 84'; Lee Heui-kyun (yellow card) 90'	Report	Jesse Sekidika 35'; Kim Young-gwon 43' (o.g.); Kim Dong-hyeon 82'; Marko Tuci (yellow card) 90+11'	Stadium: Ulsan Munsu Football Stadium; Attendance: 9,350; Referee: Kim Chong-hyuk

22 August 2026 24	Jeonbuk Hyundai Motors	1–0	Ulsan HD	Jeonju
	Bruno Mota 55' (yellow card) 57'; Choi Woo-jin (yellow card) 28'; Lee Seung-woo (yellow card) 74'; Kim Young-bin (yellow card) 90+11'	Report	Sim Sang-min (yellow card) 51'; Jung Seung-hyun (yellow card) 59'; Seo Myung-gwan (yellow card) 90+5'	Stadium: Jeonju World Cup Stadium; Attendance: 18,841; Referee: Ko Hyung-jin

26 August 2026 25	Daejeon Hana Citizen	2–1	Ulsan HD	Daejeon
	Jeong Jae-hee 90+4'; Gustav Ludwigson 90+7'; Joo Min-kyu (yellow card) 51'; Kim Bong-soo (yellow card) 83'	Report	Lee Jin-hyun 49'; Thomas Oude Kotte (yellow card) 46'; Jo Hyeon-woo (yellow card) 66'	Stadium: Daejeon World Cup Stadium; Attendance: 4,007; Referee: Shin Yong-jun

29 August 2026 26	Ulsan HD	3–1	Gimcheon Sangmu	Ulsan
	Yago Cariello 44', 75' (penalty missed); Kang Sang-woo 62' (penalty missed); Jeong Jae-sang (yellow card) 90+5'	Report	Lee Gun-hee 14'; Tae-joon Park (yellow card) 44'; Lee Jung-taek (yellow card) 45+2'	Stadium: Ulsan Munsu Football Stadium; Attendance: 8,546; Referee: Kim Yong-hyuk

5 September 2026 27	Jeju SK	0–0	Ulsan HD	Seogwipo
	Italo Moreira Barcelos (yellow card) 34'; Matheus Aias (yellow card) 45'; Byung-wook Choi (yellow card) 74'	Report	Yago Cariello (red card) 31'; Erick Farias (yellow card) 37'; Kim Young-gwon (yellow card) 45'	Stadium: Jeju World Cup Stadium; Attendance: 12,037; Referee: Choi Cheol-jun

8 September 2026 28	Ulsan HD	1–0	FC Seoul	Ulsan
	Sim Sang-min 83' (yellow card) 84'; Jang Si young (yellow card) 40'; Jung Seung-hyeon (yellow card) 69'	Report		Stadium: Ulsan Munsu Football Stadium; Attendance: 7,753; Referee: Choi Cheol-jun

12 September 2026 29	Ulsan HD	2–1	Incheon United	Ulsan
	Jung Seung-hyeon 53'; Lee Dong-gyeong 56'	Report	Stefan Mugosa 73' (pen.)	Stadium: Ulsan Munsu Football Stadium; Attendance: 11,167; Referee: Kim Yong-hyuk

19 September 2026 30	FC Anyang	2–1	Ulsan HD	Anyang
	Matheus Oliveira Santos 27'; Breno Herculano 61' (pen.) (yellow card) 77'; Kwon Kyung-won (yellow card) 90'; Kim Jeong-hoon (yellow card) 90+7'	Report	Lee Dong-gyeong 53'; Yago Cariello (penalty missed) 90+2; Jeong Seung-Hyeon (yellow card) 54'; Darijan Bojanić (yellow card) 75'; Park Yong-woo (yellow card) 83'	Stadium: Anyang Stadium; Attendance: 7,477; Referee: Shin Yong-jun

11 October 2026 31	Gwangju	4–3	Ulsan HD	Gwangju
	Adriel D'Avila Ba Loua 36', 77'; John Iredale 39'; Shin Chang-moo 66'; Kim Dong-hwa (yellow card) 90+7'	Report	Yago Cariello 30', 90+7' (pen.); Kim Young-gwon 43'	Stadium: Gwangju Football Stadium; Attendance: 6,763; Referee: Lee Dong-jun

17 October 2026 32	Ulsan HD	2–1	Bucheon	Ulsan
	Lee Jin-hyun 54'; Yago Cariello 84'; Cho Hyun-taek (yellow card) 45+8'; Jeong Seung-Hyeon (yellow card) 78'	Report	Park Jeong-in 15'; Thiaguinho Santos (yellow card) 45+7'; Kim Seung-bin (yellow card) 48' (yellow-red card); Kazuki Takahashi (yellow card) 53'	Stadium: Ulsan Munsu Football Stadium; Attendance: 25,017; Referee: Kim Dae-yong

25 October 2026 33	Ulsan HD	2–2	Pohang Steelers	Ulsan
	Kim Young-gwon 61'; Lee Dong-gyeong 68'; Lee Jae-Ik (yellow card) 20'; Lee Jin-hyun (yellow card) 90+6'	Report	Wanderson 2'; Kim Seung-ho 25'; Jorge Teixeira (penalty missed) 90	Stadium: Ulsan Munsu Football Stadium; Attendance: 15,228; Referee: Park Byung-Jin

1 November 2026 34	Ulsan HD	2–1	Gangwon	Ulsan
	Erick Farias 69', 85'	Report	Byeong-keun Hwang 41' (o.g.); Kim Gun-hee (yellow card) 88'	Stadium: Ulsan Munsu Football Stadium; Attendance: 7,038; Referee: Kim Yong-woo

8 November 2026 35	FC Seoul	1–2	Ulsan HD	Seoul
	Lee Han-do 75'	Report	Lee Dong-gyeong 35'; Yago Cariello 90'; Kim Young-gwon (yellow card) 26'; Cho Hyun taek (yellow card) 77'	Stadium: Seoul World Cup Stadium; Attendance: 13,037; Referee: Chae Sang-Hyeop

21 November 2026 36	Incheon United	2–1	Ulsan HD	Incheon
	Stefan Mugosa 23'; Gerso 84'	Report	Kim Young-gwon 87' (yellow card) 77'; Park Yong-woo (yellow card) 53'; Yoon Jong-gyu (yellow card) 64'	Stadium: Incheon Football Stadium; Attendance: 8,971; Referee: Park Byeong-jin

28 November 2026 37	Ulsan HD	–	Jeonbuk Hyundai Motors	Ulsan
		Report		Stadium: Ulsan Munsu Football Stadium

6 December 2026 38	Daejeon Hana Citizen	–	Ulsan HD	Daejeon
		Report		Stadium: Daejeon World Cup Stadium

Pos	Team	Pld	W	D	L	GF	GA	GD	Pts	Qualification or relegation (Note: Teams played each other three times (33 matches), before the league was split into two groups, the top six and the bottom six.)
1	FC Seoul (C, Q)	36	21	7	8	63	32	+31	70	Qualification for Champions League Elite league stage
2	Ulsan HD (T)	36	17	6	13	57	51	+6	57	Qualification for Champions League Elite league stage
3	Daejeon Hana Citizen (T)	36	15	11	10	58	42	+16	56	Qualification for Champions League Elite league stage
4	Incheon United	36	14	10	12	46	38	+8	52	Qualification for Champions League Elite play-off round
5	Gangwon FC	36	12	15	9	45	37	+8	51	

Updated to match(es) played on 21 November 2026. Source: Soccerway K League
Rules for classification: 1) Points; 2) Goals scored; 3) Goal difference; 4) Wins; 5) Head-to-head points
(C) Champions; (Q) Qualified for the phase indicated; (T) Qualified, but not yet for the particular phase indicated

=== 2026–27 Korea Cup ===
29 July 2025 Round 3	(K3) Ulsan Citizen	1–0	Ulsan HD	Ulsan
	Kim Jae-cheol 18'; Divine Science (yellow card) 53'	Report		Stadium: Ulsan Stadium; Attendance: 4,550; Referee: Choi Jeong-woo

=== 2025–26 AFC Champions League Elite ===
Win Draw Loss

==== League stage ====
17 September 2025 MD 1	Ulsan HD (South Korea)	2–1	(China) Chengdu Rongcheng	Ulsan, South Korea
	Um Won-sang 76'; Heo Yool 90+8'; Lee Jae-Ik (yellow card) 66'	Report	Pedro Delgado 44' (yellow card) 83' (yellow-red card) 90+3'; Yang Shuai (yellow card) 54'	Stadium: Ulsan Munsu Football Stadium; Attendance: 3,111; Referee: Ilgiz Tantashev (Uzbekistan)

1 October 2025 MD 2	Shanghai Shenhua (China)	1–1	(South Korea) Ulsan HD	Shanghai, China
	Luis Nlavo 48'	Report	Gustav Ludwigson 62'; Seo Myung-gwan (yellow card) 60'; Choi Seok-hyeon (yellow card) 75'	Stadium: Shanghai Stadium; Attendance: 30,645; Referee: Yusuke Araki (Japan)

21 October 2025 MD 3	Ulsan HD (South Korea)	1–0	(Japan) Sanfrecce Hiroshima	Ulsan, South Korea
	Kim Min-hyeok 12'; Lee Jae-Ik (yellow card) 66'	Report	Tsukasa Shiotani (yellow card) 82'	Stadium: Ulsan Munsu Football Stadium; Attendance: 2,966; Referee: Majed Al-Shamrani (Saudi Arabia)

5 November 2025 MD 4	Vissel Kobe (Japan)	1–0	(South Korea) Ulsan HD	Kobe, Japan
	Jean Patrick 58'; Matheus Thuler (yellow card) 40'	Report	Back In-Woo (yellow card) 57'	Stadium: Noevir Stadium Kobe; Attendance: 7,117; Referee: Muhammad Taqi (Singapore)

26 November 2025 MD 5	Ulsan HD (South Korea)	0–0	(Thailand) Buriram United	Ulsan, South Korea
	Milosz Trojak (yellow card) 82'; Back In-Woo (yellow card) 90'	Report	Theerathon Bunmathan (yellow card) 87'; Robert Zulj (yellow card) 90+4'	Stadium: Ulsan Munsu Football Stadium; Attendance: 2,598; Referee: Ahmad Al-Ali (Kuwait)

9 December 2025 MD 6	FC Machida Zelvia (Japan)	3–1	(South Korea) Ulsan HD	Machida, Japan
	Asahi Masuyama 6'; Takuma Nishimura 21'; Oh Se-Hun 46'	Report	Um Won-Sang 55'; Jung Seung-Hyun (yellow card) 34'	Stadium: Machida GION Stadium; Attendance: 4,345; Referee: Nazmi Nasaruddin (Malaysia)

11 February 2026 MD 7	Ulsan HD (South Korea)	1–2	(Australia) Melbourne City	Ulsan, South Korea
	Darijan Bojanić 80'	Report	Max Caputo 36'; Marcus Younis 90+3' (yellow card) 90+5'; Nathaniel Atkinson (yellow card) 90+2'	Stadium: Ulsan Munsu Football Stadium; Attendance: 3,750; Referee: Ahmad Al-Ali (Kuwait)

18 February 2026 MD 8	Shanghai Port (China)	0–0	(South Korea) Ulsan HD	Shanghai, China
	Alex Yang (yellow card) 30'	Report	Cho Hyun-taek (yellow card) 70'	Stadium: Pudong Football Stadium; Referee: Adel Al-Naqbi (United Arab Emirates)

Pos	Team	Pld	W	D	L	GF	GA	GD	Pts	Qualification
7	(South Korea) FC Seoul	8	2	4	2	10	9	+1	10	Advance to round of 16
8	(South Korea) Gangwon FC	8	2	3	3	9	11	−2	9	Advance to round of 16
9	(South Korea) Ulsan HD	8	2	3	3	6	8	−2	9	
10	(China) Chengdu Rongcheng	8	1	3	4	7	11	−4	6	
11	(China) Shanghai Shenhua	8	1	1	6	5	13	−8	4	

Source: AFC
Rules for classification: 1) points; 2) goal difference; 3) number of goals scored; 4) number of matches won; 5) penalty shoot-out if only two teams remain tied and played each other on the final matchday 6) fair play ranking; 7) drawing of lots

== Team statistics ==
=== Appearances and goals ===
As of 21 November 2026

No.	Pos.	Player	K-League		FA Cup		AFC Champions League Elite		Total	
No.	Pos.	Player	Apps.	Goals	Apps.	Goals	Apps.	Goals	Apps.	Goals
1	GK	(South Korea) Choi Joo-ho	0	0	0	0	0	0	0	0
2	DF	(South Korea) Yoon Jong-gyu	4+3	0	1	0	1+1	0	10	0
3	DF	(South Korea) Jung Seong-bin	0	0	0	0	0	0	0	0
4	DF	(South Korea) Seo Myung-gwan	14+5	1	0+1	0	1	0	21	1
6	MF	(Sweden) Darijan Bojanić	22+11	0	0	0	2	1	35	1
8	FW	(South Korea) Lee Hui-gyun	15+12	1	1	0	1	0	29	1
9	FW	(Brazil) Marcão	6+6	5	1	0	0+1	0	14	5
10	MF	(South Korea) Lee Dong-gyeong	30+4	12	0	0	2	0	36	12
11	FW	(Brazil) Erick Farias	13+3	3	0	0	0	0	16	3
13	GK	(South Korea) Ryu Sung-min	0	0	0	0	0	0	0	0
14	MF	(South Korea) Lee Jin-hyun	25+6	1	0	0	0+1	0	32	1
15	DF	(South Korea) Jung Seung-hyun	29+2	4	0	0	0	0	31	4
16	MF	(South Korea) Park Woo-jin	0	0	1	0	0+1	0	2	0
17	DF	(South Korea) Kang Sang-woo	9+11	1	1	0	2	0	23	1
19	DF	(South Korea) Kim Young-gwon	22+5	4	0	0	2	0	29	4
20	FW	(South Korea) Jeong Jae-sang	0+5	0	0+1	0	0	0	6	0
21	GK	(South Korea) Jo Hyeon-woo	34	0	0	0	2	0	36	0
22	MF	(South Korea) Lee Min-hyuk	0+10	0	1	0	0+1	0	12	0
23	GK	(South Korea) Moon Jung-in	0	0	0	0	0	0	0	0
24	MF	(South Korea) Lee Kyu-seong	25+9	0	0	0	2	0	36	0
26	DF	(South Korea) Cho Hyun-taek	32+1	0	0	0	1+1	0	35	0
27	MF	(Brazil) Pedrinho	4+3	0	0+1	0	1	0	9	0
28	DF	(South Korea) Lee Jae-ik	17+5	0	1	0	1	0	24	0
31	GK	(South Korea) Hwang Byeong-geun	1	0	1	0	0	0	2	0
33	DF	(South Korea) Jang Si-young	12+11	0	0	0	0+2	0	25	0
38	DF	(South Korea) Park Yong-woo	2+4	0	0	0	0	0	6	0
43	MF	(South Korea) Jo Min-seo	0	0	0	0	0	0	0	0
55	DF	(Netherlands) Thomas Oude Kotte	16+2	0	0	0	0	0	18	0
66	DF	(Poland) Milosz Trojak	9+10	1	1	0	0+1	0	21	1
72	MF	(South Korea) Baek In-Woo	1+1	0	0+1	0	0	0	3	0
77	DF	(South Korea) Sim Sang-min	8+11	1	1	0	1+1	0	22	1
91	FW	(United States) Benji Michel	1+12	0	1	0	0	0	14	0
96	DF	(South Korea) Choi Seok-hyeon	16+3	2	0+1	0	1	0	21	2
99	FW	(Brazil) Yago Cariello	17+11	16	0	0	2	0	30	16
Players who have played this season but had left the club on loan to other club
18	FW	(South Korea) Heo Yool	1+7	2	0	0	0+2	0	10	2
Players who have played this season but had left the club permanently
