= 2025 Ulsan HD FC season =

Ulsan HD
2025 season
- Owner: HD Hyundai Heavy Industries
- Chairman: Chung Mong-joon
- Head coach: Kim Pan-gon (from 28 July 2024 until 2 August 2025); Shin Tae-yong (from 5 August 2025 until 9 October 2025); Roh Sang-rae (from 9 October 2025 until 24 December 2025)
- Stadium: Ulsan Munsu Football Stadium
- K League 1: 9th
- Korea Cup: Quarter-finals
- Champions League Elite: TBD
- FIFA Club World Cup: Group Stage
- Top goalscorer: League: Erick Farias (10 goals); All: Erick Farias (11 goals)
- Average home league attendance: 14,465
- Biggest win: Ulsan HD 3–0 Gwangju FC (2 May 2025); Ulsan HD 3–0 Incheon United FC (14 May 2025)
- Biggest defeat: Gimcheon Sangmu FC 3–0 Ulsan HD (5 October 2025)
Home colours	Away colours

The 2025 season is Ulsan HD FC's 42nd season in the K League 1, and the first season under the new name after rebranding from Ulsan Hyundai FC. Over the course of the season, the club participated in the 2025 K League 1, the 2024 Korean FA Cup, the 2024–25 AFC Champions League Elite, the 2025–26 AFC Champions League Elite after being the 2024 K League 1 champion, and the FIFA Club World Cup.

== Players ==
No.	Name	Nationality	Date of birth (age)	Previous club	Contract since	Contract end
Goalkeepers
21	Jo Hyeon-woo	(South Korea)	25 September 1991 (age 35)	(South Korea) Daegu FC	2020	
23	Moon Jung-in	(South Korea)	16 March 1998 (age 28)	(South Korea) Seoul E-Land	2025	
25	Kim Se-hyeong	(South Korea)	24 January 2007 (age 19)	(South Korea) Ulsan HD U18	2025	2025
31	Ryu Sung-min	(South Korea)	3 January 2003 (age 23)	(South Korea) Chung-Ang University	2025	
Defenders
2	Cho Hyun-taek	(South Korea)	2 August 2001 (age 25)	(South Korea) Gimcheon Sangmu	2020	
4	Seo Myeong-kwan	(South Korea)	23 November 2002 (age 23)	(South Korea) Bucheon FC 1995	2025	
13	Kang Sang-woo	(South Korea)	7 October 1993 (age 33)	(South Korea) FC Seoul	2025	2025
15	Jung Seung-hyun	(South Korea)	3 April 1994 (age 32)	(United Arab Emirates) Al Wasl	2025	
19	Kim Young-gwon	(South Korea)	27 February 1990 (age 36)	(Japan) Gamba Osaka	2022	
24	Yoon Jong-gyu	(South Korea)	20 March 1998 (age 28)	(South Korea) FC Seoul	2025	2025
26	Park Min-seo	(South Korea)	15 September 2000 (age 26)	(South Korea) Seoul E-Land FC	2025	
28	Lee Jae-ik	(South Korea)	21 May 1999 (age 27)	(South Korea) Jeonbuk Hyundai Motors	2025	
66	Miłosz Trojak	(Poland)	5 May 1994 (age 32)	(Poland) Korona Kielce	2025	
96	Choi Seok-hyeon	(South Korea)	13 January 2003 (age 23)	(South Korea) Chungbuk Cheongju	2024	
Midfielders
5	Jung Woo-young	(South Korea)	14 December 1989 (age 36)	(Saudi Arabia) Al-Khaleej FC	2021	
6	Darijan Bojanić	(Sweden)	28 December 1994 (age 31)	(Sweden) Hammarby	2023	
7	Ko Seung-beom	(South Korea)	24 April 1994 (age 32)	(South Korea) Suwon Samsung Bluewings	2024	2027
10	Lee Dong-gyeong	(South Korea)	20 September 1997 (age 29)	(South Korea) Gimcheon Sangmu	2018	
14	Lee Jin-hyun	(South Korea)	26 August 1997 (age 29)	(Poland) Puszcza Niepołomice	2025	
17	Gustav Ludwigson	(Sweden)	20 October 1993 (age 33)	(Sweden) Hammarby	2023	
22	Kim Min-hyeok	(South Korea)	16 August 1992 (age 34)	(South Korea) Seongnam FC	2022	
30	Yoon Jae-seok	(South Korea)	22 October 2003 (age 23)	(South Korea) Jeonnam Dragons	2025	
72	Baek In-woo	(South Korea)	29 November 2006 (age 19)	(South Korea) Yongin Deokyoung	2025	
Forwards
9	Marcão	(Brazil)	17 June 1994 (age 32)	(Saudi Arabia) Al-Ahli	2025	2025
11	Um Won-sang	(South Korea)	6 January 1999 (age 27)	(South Korea) Gwangju FC	2022	2025
16	Lee Hui-gyun	(South Korea)	29 April 1998 (age 28)	(South Korea) Gwangju FC	2025	
18	Heo Yool	(South Korea)	12 April 2001 (age 25)	(South Korea) Gwangju FC	2025	
27	Lee Chung-yong	(South Korea)	2 July 1988 (age 38)	(Germany) VfL Bochum	2020	2025
36	Matías Lacava	(Venezuela) (Spain)	24 October 2002 (age 24)	(Brazil) Atlético-GO	2025	
97	Erick Farias	(Brazil)	3 January 1997 (age 29)	(Brazil) Juventude	2025	
Players who left on loan during mid-season
3	Hong Jae-seok	(South Korea)	3 July 2003 (age 23)	(South Korea) Jeju United	2024	
3	Kang Min-woo	(South Korea)	2 March 2006 (age 20)	(South Korea) Ulsan HD U18	2024	
8	Lee Kyu-seong	(South Korea)	10 May 1994 (age 32)	(South Korea) Seongnam FC	2021	
25	Jung Seong-bin	(South Korea)	12 May 2007 (age 19)	(South Korea) Ulsan HD U18	2025	2025
29	Jang Si-young	(South Korea)	31 March 2002 (age 24)	(South Korea) Yonsei University	2023	
37	Moon Hyeon-ho	(South Korea)	13 May 2003 (age 23)	(South Korea) Chungnam Asan FC	2024	
70	Choi Kang-min	(South Korea)	24 April 2002 (age 24)	(South Korea) Daegu Arts University	2024	
94	Sim Sang-min	(South Korea)	21 May 1993 (age 33)	(South Korea) Pohang Steelers	2024	2026
99	Yago Cariello	(Brazil)	27 July 1999 (age 27)	(South Korea) Gangwon FC	2024	
Players who left permanently during mid-season
68	Lee Jae-wook	(South Korea)	9 March 2001 (age 25)	(South Korea) Suwon Samsung Bluewings	2023	
10	Kim Min-woo	(South Korea)	25 February 1990 (age 36)	(China) Chengdu Rongcheng	2024	
20	Hwang Seok-ho	(South Korea)	27 June 1989 (age 37)	(Japan) Sagan Tosu	2024	2025
41	Park Sang-jun	(South Korea)	19 November 2003 (age 22)	(South Korea) Gyeongju KHNP	2024	
77	Giorgi Arabidze	(Georgia (country))	4 March 1998 (age 28)	(Georgia (country)) FC Torpedo Kutaisi	2024	2026
	Park Jae-seong	(South Korea)	28 February 2003 (age 23)	(South Korea)	2025	

== Backroom staff ==
=== Coaching staff ===
- Manager: (South Korea) Kim Pan-gon
- Assistant manager: (South Korea) Park Chu-young
- Assistant manager: (South Korea) Kim Dong-ki
- Assistant manager: (South Korea) Go Yo-han
- Goalkeeper coach: (South Korea) Kim Yong-dae
- Fitness coach: (Japan) Seigo Ikeda

== Transfers ==
=== Pre-season ===
==== In ====
Transfers in

Date	Position	Player	Transferred from	Ref
Permanent Transfer
31 December 2024	DF	(South Korea) Hong Jae-seok	(South Korea) Jeju United	End of loan
31 December 2024	DF	(South Korea) Lee Jae-won	(South Korea) Cheonan City FC	End of loan
31 December 2024	MF	(South Korea) Lee Jae-wook	(South Korea) Suwon Samsung Bluewings	End of loan
31 December 2024	DF	(South Korea) Choi Seok-hyeon	(South Korea) Chungbuk Cheongju FC	End of loan
31 December 2024	MF	(South Korea) Park Sang-jun	(South Korea) Gyeongju KHNP	End of loan
31 December 2024	MF	(South Korea) Cho Young-kwang	(South Korea) Seoul E-Land FC	End of loan
31 December 2024	MF	(South Korea) Hwang Jae-hwan	(South Korea) Bucheon FC 1995	End of loan
31 December 2024	MF	(South Korea) Kim Dong-wook	(South Korea) Jeonnam Dragons	End of loan
17 January 2025	GK	(South Korea) Moon Jung-in	(South Korea) Seoul E-Land FC	Undisclosed
17 January 2025	DF	(South Korea) Park Min-seo	(South Korea) Seoul E-Land FC	Undisclosed
17 January 2025	DF	(South Korea) Kang Sang-woo	(South Korea) FC Seoul	Free
17 January 2025	DF	(South Korea) Yoon Jong-gyu	(South Korea) FC Seoul	Undisclosed
17 January 2025	DF	(South Korea) Seo Myeong-kwan	(South Korea) Bucheon FC 1995	Undisclosed
17 January 2025	DF	(South Korea) Lee Jae-ik	(South Korea) Jeonbuk Hyundai Motors	Undisclosed
17 January 2025	MF	(South Korea) Baek In-woo	(South Korea) Yongin Deokyoung	Undisclosed
17 January 2025	MF	(South Korea) Yoon Jae-seok	(South Korea) Jeonnam Dragons	Undisclosed
17 January 2025	MF	(South Korea) Lee Jin-hyun	(Poland) Puszcza Niepołomice	Undisclosed
17 January 2025	MF	(South Korea) Lee Hui-gyun	(South Korea) Gwangju FC	Undisclosed
17 January 2025	FW	(South Korea) Heo Yool	(South Korea) Gwangju FC	Undisclosed
23 January 2025	FW	(Venezuela) (Spain) Matías Lacava	(Brazil) Atlético-GO	Undisclosed
14 March 2025	FW	(Brazil) Erick Farias	(Brazil) Juventude	Undisclosed

==== Out ====
Transfers out

Date	Position	Player	Transferred To	Ref
Permanent Transfer
23 December 2024	MF	(Japan) Ataru Esaka	(Japan) Fagiano Okayama	Undisclosed
1 January 2025	FW	(South Korea) Park Chu-young	Retired	N.A.
17 January 2025	GK	(South Korea) Jo Su-huk	(South Korea) Chungbuk Cheongju	Free
17 January 2025	DF	(South Korea) Kim Ju-hwan	(South Korea) Seoul E-land	Free
17 January 2025	DF	(South Korea) Lim Jong-eun	(South Korea) Daejeon Hana Citizen	Free
17 January 2025	DF	(South Korea) Lee Jae-won	(South Korea) Bucheon FC 1995	Free
17 January 2025	DF	(South Korea) Kim Dong-wook	(South Korea) Busan IPark	Free
17 January 2025	MF	(South Korea) Cho Young-kwang	(South Korea) Gyeongnam FC	Free
17 January 2025	FW	(South Korea) Kim Ji-hyeon	(South Korea) Suwon Samsung Bluewings	Undisclosed
17 January 2025	FW	(South Korea) Joo Min-kyu	(South Korea) Daejeon Hana Citizen	Free
17 January 2025	FW	(South Korea) Kang Yun-gu	(South Korea) Gangwon FC	Undisclosed
17 January 2025	FW	(South Korea) Kim Min-jun	(South Korea) Gangwon FC	Free
20 January 2025	FW	(South Korea) Yun Il-lok	(South Korea) Gangwon FC	Free
29 January 2025	MF	(South Korea) Hwang Jae-hwan	(South Korea) Gwangju FC	Free
31 January 2025	DF	(South Korea) Kim Kee-hee	(United States) Seattle Sounders	Free
10 February 2025	FW	(Brazil) Matheus Sales	(Brazil) Mirassol Futebol Clube	Free
2 March 2025	DF	(South Korea) Lee Myung-jae	(England) Birmingham City	Free
Loan Transfer
18 December 2023	DF	(South Korea) Cho Hyun-taek	(South Korea) Gimcheon Sangmu FC	Military Service
29 April 2024	MF	(South Korea) Lee Dong-gyeong	(South Korea) Gimcheon Sangmu FC	Military Service
17 January 2025	DF	(South Korea) Hong Jae-seok	(South Korea) Busan IPark	Season loan
27 March 2025	MF	(South Korea) Lee Kyu-seong	(South Korea) Suwon Samsung Bluewings	Season loan
7 April 2025	GK	(South Korea) Moon Hyeon-ho	(South Korea) Gimcheon Sangmu FC	Military Service

=== Mid-season ===
==== In ====
Transfers in

Date	Position	Player	Transferred from	Ref
Permanent Transfer
5 June 2025	DF	(Poland) Miłosz Trojak	(Poland) Korona Kielce	Undisclosed
9 July 2025	DF	(South Korea) Jung Seung-hyun	(United Arab Emirates) Al Wasl	Undisclosed
23 July 2025	FW	(Brazil) Marcão	(Saudi Arabia) Al-Ahli	Undisclosed
Loan Transfer
17 June 2025	DF	(South Korea) Cho Hyun-taek	(South Korea) Gimcheon Sangmu FC	End of Military Service
28 October 2025	MF	(South Korea) Lee Dong-gyeong	(South Korea) Gimcheon Sangmu FC	End of Military Service

==== Out ====
Transfers out

Date	Position	Player	Transferred from	Ref
Permanent Transfer
4 June 2025	DF	(South Korea) Lee Jae-wook	(South Korea) Seongnam FC	Free
5 June 2025	DF	(South Korea) Hwang Seok-ho	(South Korea) Suwon Samsung Bluewings	Undisclosed
27 June 2025	MF	(South Korea) Park Sang-jun	(South Korea) Jeonnam Dragons	Free
27 June 2025	MF	(South Korea) Park Jae-seong	(South Korea) Hwaseong FC	Free
1 July 2025	FW	(Georgia (country)) Giorgi Arabidze	(South Korea)	Free
25 July 2025	MF	(South Korea) Kim Min-woo	(South Korea) Suwon Samsung Bluewings	Free
Loan Transfer
4 June 2025	MF	(South Korea) Choi Kang-min	(South Korea) Chungbuk Cheongju FC	Season loan
5 June 2025	DF	(South Korea) Jung Seong-bin	(Austria) FC Liefering	Loan till 30 June 2026
10 June 2025	FW	(South Korea) Jang Si-young	(South Korea) Bucheon	Season loan
13 June 2025	DF	(South Korea) Sim Sang-min	(South Korea) Gwangju FC	Season loan
6 July 2025	FW	(Brazil) Yago Cariello	(China) Zhejiang FC	Season loan
August 2025	DF	(South Korea) Kang Min-woo	(Belgium) Genk	Season loan (Note: Min-woo will move on loan before having the contract permanent after loan completion.)

== Friendly matches ==
Win Draw Loss

=== Tour of UAE (6 Jan - 26 Feb) ===
14 January 2025 1	FC Rapid București (Romania)	1–2	(South Korea) Ulsan HD	Dubai, UAE
	Aaron Boupendza 12' (pen.)		Um Won-sang 32'; Choi Seok-hyeon 40'	Stadium: Jebel Ali Centre of Excellence

18 January 2025 2	MŠK Žilina (Slovakia)	1–1	(South Korea) Ulsan HD	Dubai, UAE
			Ko Seung-beom 24'	Stadium: Jebel Ali Centre of Excellence

21 January 2025 3	Precision FC (United Arab Emirates)	0–10	(South Korea) Ulsan HD	Dubai, UAE
			Lee Hee-kyun; Heo Yool; Darijan Bojanić; Yoon Jong-gyu; Lee Chung-yong; Park Min-seo; Jeong Sung-bin; Yago Cariello	Stadium: Ibn Battuta Mall

24 January 2025 4	FC Lokomotiv Moscow (Russia)	0–1	(South Korea) Ulsan HD	Abu Dhabi, UAE
			Yoon Jae-seok	Stadium: Sheikh Zayed Stadium

25 January 2025 5	FC Dinamo Samarqand (Uzbekistan)	1–2	(South Korea) Ulsan HD	Abu Dhabi, UAE
			Yago Cariello; Choi Seok-hyeon	Stadium: Sheikh Zayed Stadium

=== Others ===
2 February 2025 1	KHNP FC (South Korea)	2–6	(South Korea) Ulsan HD	Korea

6 February 2025 1	Seongnam FC (South Korea)	2–6	(South Korea) Ulsan HD	Korea

11 June 2025 1	Charlotte FC (United States)	2–5	(South Korea) Ulsan HD	Charlotte, USA
			Lee Chung-yong; Erick Farias; Eom Won-sang; Milosz Trojak; Lee Jin-hyun	Stadium: Atrium Health Performance Park

== Competitions ==
=== Overall record ===
Competition	First match	Last match	Starting round	Final position	Record							
Competition	First match	Last match	Starting round	Final position	Pld	W	D	L	GF	GA	GD	Win %
K League 1	15 February	30 November	Matchday 1	9th	38	11	11	16	42	50	−8	28.95
Korea Cup	14 May	2 July	Round of 16	Quarter-finals	2	1	0	1	3	1	+2	50.00
2024–25 ACLE	12 February	12 February	League stage	League stage	1	0	0	1	1	2	−1	0.00
CWC	17 June	25 June	Group stage	Group stage	3	0	0	3	2	6	−4	0.00
2025–26 ACLE	17 September	9 December	League stage	TBD	6	2	2	2	5	6	−1	33.33
Total					50	14	13	23	53	65	−12	28.00

Source: Soccerway

=== K League 1 ===
==== Matches ====
As usual, the league season is played over 38 matches. After 33 league matches between the 12 participating teams, the teams are split into the final round (top 6 teams) and relegation round (bottom 6 teams).

15 February 2025 1	Ulsan HD	0–1	FC Anyang	Ulsan
		Report	Bruno Mota 90+2'	Stadium: Ulsan Munsu Football Stadium; Attendance: 18,718; Referee: Kim Yong-woo

23 February 2025 2	Daejeon Hana Citizen	0–2	Ulsan HD	Daejeon
	Park Kyu-hyun (yellow card) 52'	Report	Yoon Jae-Seok 8'; Heo Yool 58'; Kim Min-hyeok (yellow card) 22'; Matías Lacava (yellow card) 45+2'	Stadium: Daejeon World Cup Stadium; Attendance: 19,628; Referee: Kim Jong-hyuk

1 March 2025 3	Ulsan HD	1–0	Jeonbuk Hyundai Motors	Ulsan
	Darijan Bojanić 66'; Heo Yool (yellow card) 6'; Yoon Jong-gyu (yellow card) 35'; Seo Myung-Guan (yellow card) 76'; Kim Min-hyeok (yellow card) 77'	Report	Park Jin-seop (yellow card) 6'; Lee Seung-woo (yellow card) 23'; Han Kook-young (yellow card) 42'	Stadium: Ulsan Munsu Football Stadium; Attendance: 26,317; Referee: Kim Woo-sung

9 March 2025 4	Ulsan HD	2–0	Jeju SK	Ulsan
	Heo Yool 33', 71'; Lee Jin-hyun (yellow card) 37'; Matías Lacava (yellow card) 42'; Kim Min-hyeok (yellow card) 64'; Choi Seok-hyeon (yellow card) 90'	Report	Italo (yellow card) 57'	Stadium: Ulsan Munsu Football Stadium; Attendance: 16,749; Referee: Song Min-seok

16 March 2025 5	Suwon FC	1–1	Ulsan HD	Suwon
	Luan Dias 13' (yellow card) 40'	Report	Erick Farias 73'; Matías Lacava (penalty missed) 58; Seo Myung-Guan (yellow card) 59'; Lee Hui-Gyun (yellow card) 80'	Stadium: Suwon Sports Complex; Attendance: 5,557; Referee: Kim Yong-woo

29 March 2025 6	Pohang Steelers	1–0	Ulsan HD	Pohang
	Lee Ho-jae 80'; Han Hyeon-Seo (yellow card) 90'	Report		Stadium: Pohang Steel Yard; Attendance: 12,565; Referee: Kim Dae-young

5 April 2025 7	Ulsan HD	0–0	FC Seoul	Ulsan
	Kang Sang-Woo (yellow card) 5'; Lee Jin-hyun (yellow card) 75'	Report	Willyan (yellow card) 34'	Stadium: Ulsan Munsu Football Stadium; Attendance: 20,358; Referee: Ko Hyung-jin

13 April 2025 8	Daegu FC	0–1	Ulsan HD	Daegu
		Report	Kang Sang-Woo 67'	Stadium: DGB Daegu Bank Park; Attendance: 12,218; Referee: Seol Tae-hwan

19 April 2025 9	Ulsan HD	1–2	Gangwon FC	Ulsan
	Erick Farias 45+3' (pen.); Yoon Jong-gyu (yellow card) 73'	Report	Kim Kang-Guk 17'; Shin Min-Ha 47'; Lee Ji-Ho (yellow card) 61'; Marko Tući (yellow card) 90+1'; Lee Gwang-yeon (yellow card) 90+8'	Stadium: Ulsan Munsu Football Stadium; Attendance: 13,536; Referee: Kim Woo-sung

27 April 2025 10	Gimcheon Sangmu FC	2–0	Ulsan HD	Gimcheon
	Yu Kang-hyun 30'; Park Sang-Hyeok 90'	Report	Kim Young-gwon (yellow card) 44'; Erick Farias (yellow card) 89'	Stadium: Gimcheon Stadium; Attendance: 3,300; Referee: Chae Sang-hyeop

2 May 2025 11	Ulsan HD	3–0	Gwangju FC	Ulsan
	Lee Chung-yong 18'; Matías Lacava 77'; Erick Farias 90+3'	Report	Ju Se-jong (yellow card) 32'; Kang Hui-Su (yellow card) 36'; Ahn Young-kyu (yellow card) 54'; Park Jeong-in (yellow card) 87'	Stadium: Ulsan Munsu Football Stadium; Attendance: 9,659; Referee: Seol Tae-hwan

5 May 2025 12	Ulsan HD	1–1	Pohang Steelers	Ulsan
	Darijan Bojanić 45+3'; Park Min-Seo (yellow card) 41'; Yoon Jae-seok (yellow card) 58'	Report	Oberdan 8'; Juninho Rocha (penalty missed) 90+8	Stadium: Ulsan Munsu Football Stadium; Attendance: 23,442; Referee: Kim Chong-hyuk

11 May 2025 13	Jeju SK	1–2	Ulsan HD	Seogwipo
	Yuri 53' (penalty missed) 90+6; Ko Seung-Beom (yellow card) 51'	Report	Gustav Ludwigson 5'; Erick Farias 65'; Jung Woo-young (yellow card) 27'; Kang Sang-Woo (yellow card) 69'; Kim Min-hyeok (yellow card) 84' (yellow-red card) 90'	Stadium: Jeju World Cup Stadium; Attendance: 8,012; Referee: Shin Yong-jun

17 May 2025 14	Gangwon FC	1–1	Ulsan HD	Chuncheon
	Cho Jin-Hyuk 90+3' (yellow card) 76'	Report	Seo Myung-Guan 65'; Yoon Jae-seok (yellow card) 32'; Ko Seung-Beom (yellow card) 58'; Erick Farias (yellow card) 68'; Matías Lacava (yellow card) 76'; Heo Yool (yellow card) 89'	Stadium: Chuncheon Songam Sports Town; Attendance: 6,920; Referee: Song Min-seok

24 May 2025 15	Ulsan HD	3–2	Gimcheon Sangmu FC	Ulsan
	Erick Farias 73' (pen.), 88'; Um Won-sang 90'; Ko Seung-Beom (yellow card) 58'	Report	Lee Dong-gyeong 31'; Park Soo-Il 59'; Park Sang-Hyeok (yellow card) 70'; Lee Seung-won (yellow card) 90+3'	Stadium: Ulsan Munsu Football Stadium; Attendance: 16,012; Referee: Lee Dong-jun

28 May 2025 16	Gwangju FC	1–1	Ulsan HD	Gwangju
	Byeon Jun-Soo 6' (yellow card) 31'; Cho Seong-Gwon (yellow card) 79'	Report	Erick Farias 48'; Kim Min-hyeok (yellow card) 67'; Park Min-Seo (yellow card) 81'; Heo Yool (yellow card) 90+1'	Stadium: Gwangju Football Stadium; Attendance: 2,933; Referee: Park Byung-jin

31 May 2025 17	Jeonbuk Hyundai Motors	3–1	Ulsan HD	Jeonju
	Song Min-kyu 26'; Park Jin-seop 86'; Hong Jeong-Ho (yellow card) 86'; Tiago Orobó 90+8' (yellow card) 90+5'	Report	Lee Chung-yong 11'; Jung Woo-young (yellow card) 36'	Stadium: Jeonju World Cup Stadium; Attendance: 31,830; Referee: Kim Dae-young

1 April 2025 18 (Rescheduled)	Ulsan HD	2–3	Daejeon Hana Citizen	Ulsan
	Park Min-seo 42'; Lee Hui-gyun 45+4'; Kim Young-gwon (yellow card) 29'	Report	Shin Sang-Eun 3'; Kim Hyeon-Ug 13' (pen.); Joo Min-kyu 63' (yellow card) 90+2'; Vladislavs Gutkovskis (yellow card) 32'; Kim In-Gyun (yellow card) 76'	Stadium: Ulsan Munsu Football Stadium; Attendance: 6,902; Referee: Shin Yong-jun

23 April 2025 19 (Rescheduled)	FC Anyang	0–1	Ulsan HD	Anyang
	Kim Woon (yellow card) 25'; Ri Yong-jik (yellow card) 72'; Bruno Rodrigues Mota (yellow card) 85'; Matheus Oliveira Santos (yellow card) 90+5'	Report	Erick Farias 50' (pen.); Ko Seung-Beom (yellow card) 90+5'; Kang Min-Woo (yellow card) 90+8'	Stadium: Anyang Stadium; Attendance: 5,592; Referee: Kim Dae-yong

2 August 2025 20 (Rescheduled)	Ulsan HD	2–3	Suwon FC	Ulsan
	Cho Hyun-taek 50'; Ko Seung-Beom 63'; Kim Min-hyeok (yellow card) 10'	Report	Pablo Sabbag 59', 67'; Willyan 70'; Kim Tae-han (yellow card) 60'	Stadium: Ulsan Munsu Football Stadium; Attendance: 10,197; Referee: Shin Yong-jun

12 July 2025 21 (Rescheduled)	Ulsan HD	2–2	Daegu FC	Ulsan
	Lee Jin-hyun 64'; Woo Joo-sung 79' (o.g.)	Report	Cesinha 33', 87'; Han Jong-Mu (yellow card) 55'; Oh Seung-hoon (yellow card) 63'; Jo Jin-woo (yellow card) 90+5'; Kim Jeong-hyun (yellow card) 90+7'	Stadium: Ulsan Munsu Football Stadium; Attendance: 14,555; Referee: Kim Yong-woo

20 July 2025 22	FC Seoul	1–0	Ulsan HD	Seoul
	Jesse Lingard 42'; Kim Ju-sung (yellow card) 66'; Kim Jin-su (yellow card) 750'	Report	Seo Myong-Gwan (yellow card) 36'; Ko Seung-Beom (yellow card) 45+3'; Kim Young-gwon (yellow card) 45+4'; Lee Jae-ik (yellow card) 90+2'	Stadium: Seoul World Cup Stadium; Attendance: 24,047; Referee: Ko Hyung-jin

23 July 2025 23	Ulsan HD	1–2	Daejeon Hana Citizen	Ulsan
	Erick Farias 43'; Lee Jae-ik (yellow card) 82'	Report	Lee Myung-jae 45'; Kim Jun-Beom 90+5'; Anton Kryvotsyuk (yellow card) 38'	Stadium: Ulsan Munsu Football Stadium; Attendance: 8,127; Referee: Song Min-Seok

27 July 2025 24	Gangwon FC	2–2	Ulsan HD	Chuncheon
	Kim Dae-won 51'; Hong Chul 90+7'; Seo Min-woo (yellow card) 2'	Report	Marcos Vinicius 30', 83'; Lee Jae-ik (yellow card) 40'; Jo Hyeon-woo (yellow card) 43'; Choi Seok-Hyun (yellow card) 90+3'	Stadium: Chuncheon Songam Sports Town; Attendance: 9,144; Referee: Chae Sang-hyeop

9 August 2025 25	Ulsan HD	1–0	Jeju SK	Ulsan
	Gustav Ludwigson 73'	Report	Kim Jun-ha (yellow card) 27'; Jang Min-gyu (yellow card) 39'; Rim Chang-woo (yellow card) 87'; Song Ju-hun (yellow card) 90+2'	Stadium: Ulsan Munsu Football Stadium; Attendance: 10,510; Referee: Park Byeon-jin

16 August 2025 26	Suwon FC	4–2	Ulsan HD	Suwon
	Pablo Sabbag 2', 75'; Willyan 61' (pen.); Roh Kyung-ho 90+2'; Andrigo (yellow card) 38'; Hwang Jae-Yun (yellow card) 90'	Report	Marcos Vinicius 6'; Gustav Ludwigson 90+8'	Stadium: Suwon Sports Complex; Attendance: 5,702; Referee: Song Min-seok

24 August 2025 27	FC Seoul	3–2	Ulsan HD	Seoul
	Choi Jun 6'; Cho Young-wook 31'; Hwang Do-Yun 39'; Marko Dugandžić (yellow card) 21'; Anderson (yellow card) 90+6'	Report	Ko Seung-Beom 23' (yellow card) 49'; Erick Farias 90+4'; Choi Seok-Hyun (yellow card) 90+6'	Stadium: Seoul World Cup Stadium; Attendance: 20,737; Referee: Ko Hyung-jin

30 August 2025 28	Ulsan HD	0–2	Jeonbuk Hyundai Motors	Ulsan
	Ko Seung-Beom (yellow card) 54'; Lee Hui-Gyun (yellow card) 71'; Yoon Jae-Seok (yellow card) 90+4'; Jeong Seung-Hyeon (yellow card) 90+7'	Report	Lee Yeong-jae 54'; Jeon Jin-woo 59' (yellow card) 7'; Kim Tae-Hyun (yellow card) 31'; Kim Jin-Kyu (yellow card) 45+3'; Park Jin-seop (yellow card) 71'	Stadium: Ulsan Munsu Football Stadium; Attendance: 23,294; Referee: Seol Tae-hwan

13 September 2025 29	Pohang Steelers	1–1	Ulsan HD	Pohang
	Lee Ho-jae 41'; Oberdan (yellow card) 32'; Shin Kwang-Hoon (yellow card) 43'	Report	Heo Yool 44'; Kim Young-gwon (yellow card) 86'	Stadium: Pohang Steel Yard; Attendance: 14,166; Referee: Kim Yong-woo

21 September 2025 30	Ulsan HD	0–0	FC Anyang	Ulsan
	Milosz Trojak (yellow card) 31'; Gustav Ludwigson (yellow card) 36'; Lee Hui-Gyun (yellow card) 89'	Report	Bruno Mota (yellow card) 32'; Chae Hyun-Woo (yellow card) 82'; Han Ka-Ram (yellow card) 90+2'	Stadium: Ulsan Munsu Football Stadium; Attendance: 13,201; Referee: Song Min-seok

28 September 2025 31	Daegu FC	1–1	Ulsan HD	Daegu
	Cesinha 40'; Jung Heon-Taek (yellow card) 22'; Hwang Jae-won (yellow card) 52'	Report	Baek In-woo 60'; Jeong Seung-Hyeon (yellow card) 23'; Darijan Bojanić (yellow card) 36'; Park Min-seo (yellow card) 81'; Ko Seung-Beom (yellow card) 90+2'	Stadium: DGB Daegu Bank Park; Attendance: 10,601; Referee: Ko Hyung-jin

5 October 2025 32	Gimcheon Sangmu FC	3–0	Ulsan HD	Gimcheon
	Lee Dong-Jun 29'; Kim Seung-Sub 79'; Lee Dong-gyeong 81'	Report	Kang Sang-Woo (yellow card) 90+3'	Stadium: Gimcheon Stadium; Attendance: 4,239; Referee: Shin Yong-jun

18 October 2025 33	Ulsan HD	2–0	Gwangju FC	Ulsan
	Gustav Ludwigson 21'; Erick Farias (yellow card) 74'; Jo Hyeon-woo (yellow card) 90+2'; Lee Chung-yong 90+13' (yellow card) 90+10'	Report	Moon Min-Seo (yellow card) 74'; Byeon Jun-soo (yellow card) 74'; Ha Seung-un (yellow card) 90+12'	Stadium: Ulsan Munsu Football Stadium; Attendance: 10,294; Referee: Kim Yong-woo

26 October 2025 34	Ulsan HD	1–1	Daegu FC	Ulsan
	Lee Chung-yong 90+6'; Seo Myung-gwan (yellow card) 57'	Report	Kim Ju-gong 45'	Stadium: Ulsan Munsu Football Stadium; Attendance: 10,858; Referee: Kim Jong-hyuk

1 November 2025 35	FC Anyang	3–1	Ulsan HD	Anyang
	Bruno Mota 39'; Lee Chang-yong 56'; Chae Hyun-woo 77'; Matheus Oliveira Santos (penalty missed) 23; Choe Gyu-hyeon (yellow card) 76'	Report	Ko Seung-Beom 13'; Kim Min-hyeok (yellow card) 10' (yellow-red card) 45+2'; Jeong Seung-Hyeon (yellow card) 34'; Park Min-seo (yellow card) 42'; Kang Sang-Woo (yellow card) 45+10'	Stadium: Anyang Stadium; Attendance: 8,206; Referee: Song Min-seok

9 November 2025 36	Ulsan HD	1–0	Suwon FC	Ulsan
	Gustav Ludwigson 47'; Jung Woo-Young (yellow card) 28'; Heo Yool (yellow card) 90+11'	Report	Pablo Sabbag (yellow card) 90+8'; Lee Yong (yellow card) 56'; Luan Dias (yellow card) 86'	Stadium: Ulsan Munsu Football Stadium; Attendance: 10,187; Referee: Kim Dae-young

22 November 2025 37	Gwangju FC	2–0	Ulsan HD	Gwangju
	Hólmbert Friðjónsson 3'; Choi Kyoung-rok 75'	Report		Stadium: Gwangju Football Stadium; Attendance: 4,033; Referee: Kim Chong-hyuk

30 November 2025 38	Ulsan HD	0–1	Jeju SK	Ulsan
	Gustav Ludwigson (yellow card) 23'; Heo Yool (yellow card) 26'; Yoon Jong-gyu (yellow card) 90+6'	Report	Kim Seung-sub 89'; Lee Chang-min (yellow card) 14'; Yuri (yellow card) 32'; Italo Moreira Barcelos (yellow card) 69'	Stadium: Ulsan Munsu Football Stadium; Attendance: 11,928; Referee: Ko Hyung-jin

Pos	Team	Pld	W	D	L	GF	GA	GD	Pts	Qualification or relegation (Note: Teams played each other three times (33 matches), before the league was split into two groups, the top six and the bottom six.)
7	Gwangju FC	38	15	9	14	40	41	−1	54	
8	FC Anyang	38	14	7	17	49	47	+2	49	
9	Ulsan HD	38	11	11	16	42	50	−8	44	
10	Suwon FC (R)	38	11	9	18	51	58	−7	42	Qualification for relegation play-offs
11	Jeju SK (O)	38	10	9	19	40	53	−13	39	Qualification for relegation play-offs

Source: Soccerway K League
Rules for classification: 1) Points; 2) Goals scored; 3) Goal difference; 4) Wins; 5) Head-to-head points
(O) Play-off winners; (R) Relegated

=== Korean FA Cup ===
14 May 2025 Round of 16	Ulsan HD	3–0	Incheon United (K2)	Ulsan
	Heo Yool 31'; Erik Farias 82'; Kim Min-woo 84'; Lee Hui-Gyun (yellow card) 37'		Lim Hyeong-Jin (yellow card) 29'; Lee Sang-gi (yellow card) 89'; Mun Ji-hwan (yellow card) 90+2'	Stadium: Ulsan Munsu Football Stadium

2 July 2025 Quarter Final	Gwangju FC	1–0	Ulsan HD	Gwangju
	Cho Seong-Gwon 75'; (yellow card) 14'		Lee Jin-hyun (yellow card) 28'; Kim Young-gwon (red card) 43'	Stadium: Gwangju Football Stadium

=== 2025 FIFA Club World Cup ===
Pos	Team	Pld	W	D	L	GF	GA	GD	Pts	Qualification
1	(Germany) Borussia Dortmund	3	2	1	0	5	3	+2	7	Advance to knockout stage
2	(Brazil) Fluminense	3	1	2	0	4	2	+2	5	Advance to knockout stage
3	(South Africa) Mamelodi Sundowns	3	1	1	1	4	4	0	4	
4	(South Korea) Ulsan HD	3	0	0	3	2	6	−4	0	

Source: FIFA
Rules for classification: Group stage tiebreakers

Win Draw Loss

==== Group stage ====
17 June 2025 1	Ulsan HD (South Korea)	0–1	(South Africa) Mamelodi Sundowns	Orlando, United States
	Bojanić (yellow card) 55'	Report	Rayners 36'; Mokoena (yellow card) 85'	Stadium: Inter&Co Stadium; Attendance: 3,412; Referee: Clément Turpin (France)

21 June 2025 2	Fluminense (Brazil)	4–2	(South Korea) Ulsan HD	East Rutherford, United States
	Arias 7'; Nonato 66'; Freytes 83'; Keno 90+2', (yellow card) 90+3'	Report	Lee Jin-hyun 37'; Um Won-sang 45+3'	Stadium: MetLife Stadium; Attendance: 29,321; Referee: Michael Oliver (England)

25 June 2025 3	Borussia Dortmund (Germany)	1–0	(South Korea) Ulsan HD	Cincinnati, United States
	Bellingham (yellow card) 28'; Svensson 36'; Nmecha (yellow card) 53'	Report	Kim Min-hyeok (yellow card) 17'; Kang Sang-woo (yellow card) 54'	Stadium: TQL Stadium; Attendance: 8,239; Referee: Tori Penso (United States)

=== 2024–25 AFC Champions League Elite ===
Pos	Team	Pld	W	D	L	GF	GA	GD	Pts	Qualification
8	(China) Shanghai Port	8	2	2	4	10	18	−8	8	Advance to round of 16
9	(South Korea) Pohang Steelers	7	2	0	5	9	17	−8	6	
10	(South Korea) Ulsan HD	7	1	0	6	4	16	−12	3	
11	(Australia) Central Coast Mariners	7	0	1	6	8	18	−10	1	
12	(China) Shandong Taishan	0	0	0	0	0	0	0	0	Withdrawn, record expunged (Note: Shandong Taishan were considered to have withdrawn from the AFC Champions League Elite after the club confirmed that it did not intend to report for their league stage match against Ulsan HD on 19 February 2025. Their remaining fixture was cancelled, with their seven played matches being expunged.)

Source: Asian Football Confederation
Rules for classification: 1) points; 2) goal difference; 3) number of goals scored; 4) number of matches won; 5) penalty shoot-out if only two teams remain tied and played each other on the final matchday 6) fair play ranking; 7) drawing of lots
Notes:

Win Draw Loss

==== League stage ====
12 February 2025 7	Buriram United (Thailand)	2–1	(South Korea) Ulsan HD	Buriram, Thailand
19:00 UTC+7	Guilherme Bissoli 20'; Suphanat Mueanta 90+4'; Martin Boakye (yellow card) 28'; Peter Žulj (yellow card) 69'	Report	Jang Si-young 45'; Lee Gyu-Sung (yellow card) 26'; Yago Cariello (yellow card) 78'; Lee Jae-ik (yellow card) 88'	Stadium: Buriram Stadium; Attendance: 16,068; Referee: Alireza Faghani (Australia)

19 February 2025 8	Ulsan HD (South Korea)	cancelled (Note: The match was cancelled by Asian Football Confederation (AFC) after Shandong Taishan confirmed that it did not intend to report for the match.)	(China) Shandong Taishan	Ulsan, South Korea
19:00 UTC+9				Stadium: Ulsan Munsu Football Stadium

=== 2025–26 AFC Champions League Elite ===
Win Draw Loss

==== League stage ====
17 September 2025 MD 1	Ulsan HD (South Korea)	2–1	(China) Chengdu Rongcheng	Ulsan, South Korea
	Um Won-sang 76'; Heo Yool 90+8'; Lee Jae-Ik (yellow card) 66'	Report	Pedro Delgado 44' (yellow card) 83' (yellow-red card) 90+3'; Yang Shuai (yellow card) 54'	Stadium: Ulsan Munsu Football Stadium; Attendance: 3,111; Referee: Ilgiz Tantashev (Uzbekistan)

1 October 2025 MD 2	Shanghai Shenhua (China)	1–1	(South Korea) Ulsan HD FC	Shanghai, China
	Luis Nlavo 48'	Report	Gustav Ludwigson 62'; Seo Myung-gwan (yellow card) 60'; Choi Seok-hyeon (yellow card) 75'	Stadium: Shanghai Stadium; Attendance: 30,645; Referee: Yusuke Araki (Japan)

21 October 2025 MD 3	Ulsan HD (South Korea)	1–0	(Japan) Sanfrecce Hiroshima	Ulsan, South Korea
	Kim Min-hyeok 12'; Lee Jae-Ik (yellow card) 66'	Report	Tsukasa Shiotani (yellow card) 82'	Stadium: Ulsan Munsu Football Stadium; Attendance: 2,966; Referee: Majed Al-Shamrani (Saudi Arabia)

5 November 2025 MD 4	Vissel Kobe (Japan)	1–0	(South Korea) Ulsan HD FC	Kobe, Japan
	Jean Patrick 58'; Matheus Thuler (yellow card) 40'	Report	Back In-Woo (yellow card) 57'	Stadium: Noevir Stadium Kobe; Attendance: 7,117; Referee: Muhammad Taqi (Singapore)

26 November 2025 MD 5	Ulsan HD (South Korea)	0–0	(Thailand) Buriram United	Ulsan, South Korea
	Milosz Trojak (yellow card) 82'; Back In-Woo (yellow card) 90'	Report	Theerathon Bunmathan (yellow card) 87'	Stadium: Ulsan Munsu Football Stadium; Attendance: 2,598; Referee: Ahmad Al-Ali (Kuwait)

9 December 2025 MD 6	FC Machida Zelvia (Japan)	3–1	(South Korea) Ulsan HD FC	Machida, Japan
	Asahi Masuyama 6'; Takuma Nishimura 21'; Oh Se-Hun 46'	Report	Um Won-Sang 55'; Jung Seung-Hyun (yellow card) 34'	Stadium: Machida GION Stadium; Attendance: 4,345; Referee: Nazmi Nasaruddin (Malaysia)

11 February 2026 MD 7	Ulsan HD (South Korea)	1–2	(Australia) Melbourne City	Ulsan, South Korea
	Darijan Bojanić 80'	Report	Max Caputo 36'; Marcus Younis 90+3' (yellow card) 90+5'; Nathaniel Atkinson (yellow card) 90+2'	Stadium: Ulsan Munsu Football Stadium; Referee: Ahmad Al-Ali (Kuwait)

18 February 2026 MD 8	Shanghai Port (China)	–	(South Korea) Ulsan HD	Shanghai, China
		Report		Stadium: Pudong Football Stadium

Pos	Team	Pld	W	D	L	GF	GA	GD	Pts	Qualification
7	(South Korea) FC Seoul	8	2	4	2	10	9	+1	10	Advance to round of 16
8	(South Korea) Gangwon FC	8	2	3	3	9	11	−2	9	Advance to round of 16
9	(South Korea) Ulsan HD	8	2	3	3	6	8	−2	9	
10	(China) Chengdu Rongcheng	8	1	3	4	7	11	−4	6	
11	(China) Shanghai Shenhua	8	1	1	6	5	13	−8	4	

Source: AFC
Rules for classification: 1) points; 2) goal difference; 3) number of goals scored; 4) number of matches won; 5) penalty shoot-out if only two teams remain tied and played each other on the final matchday 6) fair play ranking; 7) drawing of lots

== Team statistics ==
=== Appearances and goals ===
As of 9 December 2025

No.	Pos.	Player	K-League		FA Cup		2025 FIFA Club World Cup		AFC Champions League Elite 2024/25 ACL Elite		AFC Champions League Elite 2025/26 ACL Elite		Total	
No.	Pos.	Player	Apps.	Goals	Apps.	Goals	Apps.	Goals	Apps.	Goals	Apps.	Goals	Apps.	Goals
2	DF	(South Korea) Cho Hyun-taek	9+2	1	1	0	0	0	0	0	2+2	0	16	1
4	DF	(South Korea) Seo Myeong-kwan	17+5	1	2	0	1	0	0	0	6	0	31	1
5	MF	(South Korea) Jung Woo-young	13+4	0	0+1	0	1+1	0	1	0	1	0	22	0
6	MF	(Sweden) Darijan Bojanić	16+8	2	1+1	0	3	0	1	0	2+1	0	34	2
7	MF	(South Korea) Ko Seung-beom	28	2	1	0	2+1	0	0	0	2+1	0	36	2
9	FW	(Brazil) Marcão	2+6	2	0	0	0	0	0	0	3+2	0	13	2
10	MF	(South Korea) Lee Dong-gyeong	2	0	0	0	0	0	0	0	0+2	0	4	0
11	FW	(South Korea) Um Won-sang	8+22	1	1	0	2	1	0	0	0+5	2	37	4
13	DF	(South Korea) Kang Sang-woo	25+7	1	1	0	2+1	0	0	0	1	0	37	1
14	MF	(South Korea) Lee Jin-hyun	18+4	1	2	0	2+1	1	0	0	4+1	0	35	2
15	DF	(South Korea) Jung Seung-hyun	13	0	0	0	0	0	0	0	1+3	0	17	0
16	FW	(South Korea) Lee Hui-gyun	8+20	1	1	0	0+2	0	0	0	4	0	35	1
17	MF	(Sweden) Gustav Ludwigson	22+13	5	1	0	3	0	1	0	2+1	1	43	6
18	FW	(South Korea) Heo Yool	18+8	4	1+1	1	0+2	0	0	0	3+3	0	36	5
19	DF	(South Korea) Kim Young-gwon	29+2	0	1+1	0	3	0	0	0	1	0	41	0
21	GK	(South Korea) Jo Hyeon-woo	32	0	2	0	3	0	1	0	3	0	41	0
22	DF	(South Korea) Kim Min-hyeok	9+6	0	1	0	1	0	0	0	2	1	19	1
23	GK	(South Korea) Moon Jung-in	5	0	0	0	0	0	0+1	0	3	0	9	0
24	DF	(South Korea) Yoon Jong-gyu	12+1	0	1	0	0	0	0	0	0	0	14	0
26	DF	(South Korea) Park Min-seo	13+2	1	1	0	0+1	0	0+1	0	3+1	0	22	1
27	FW	(South Korea) Lee Chung-yong	10+13	4	0+1	0	1+2	0	0	0	0+4	0	31	4
28	DF	(South Korea) Lee Jae-ik	6+6	0	1+1	0	2	0	1	0	4	0	21	0
30	MF	(South Korea) Yoon Jae-seok	25+3	1	0	0	0	0	0+1	0	0	0	29	1
31	GK	(South Korea) Ryu Sung-min	0	0	0	0	0	0	0	0	0	0	0	0
36	FW	(Venezuela) Matías Lacava	9+15	1	1+1	0	1+2	0	1	0	4	0	34	1
66	DF	(Poland) Milosz Trojak	6+2	0	1	0	3	0	0	0	5	0	17	0
72	MF	(South Korea) Baek In-Woo	11+1	1	0	0	0	0	0	0	4	0	16	1
96	DF	(South Korea) Choi Seok-hyeon	7+15	0	0	0	0+1	0	1	0	5	0	29	0
97	FW	(Brazil) Erick Farias	23+5	10	1+1	1	3	0	0	0	1+1	0	35	11
Players featured on a match but left the club mid-season on loan transfer
3	DF	(South Korea) Kang Min-woo	3+3	0	0	0	0	0	0	0	0	0	6	0
8	MF	(South Korea) Lee Kyu-seong	0	0	0	0	0	0	1	0	0	0	1	0
20	DF	(South Korea) Hwang Seok-ho	3	0	0	0	0	0	0	0	0	0	3	0
29	FW	(South Korea) Jang Si-young	0+2	0	0	0	0	0	1	1	0	0	3	1
37	GK	(South Korea) Moon Hyun-ho	0	0	0	0	0	0	0	0	0	0	0	0
70	FW	(South Korea) Choi Kang-min	0	0	0	0	0	0	1	0	0	0	1	0
94	DF	(South Korea) Sim Sang-min	0	0	0	0	0	0	0	0	0	0	0	0
99	FW	(Brazil) Yago Cariello	2+3	0	0	0	0	0	1	0	0	0	6	0
Players featured on a match but left the club mid-season permanently
10	MF	(South Korea) Kim Min-woo	0	0	0+1	1	0	0	0+1	0	0	0	2	1
25	DF	(South Korea) Jung Seong-bin	0	0	0	0	0	0	0+1	0	0	0	1	0
68	MF	(South Korea) Lee Jae-wook	0	0	0	0	0	0	0	0	0	0	0	0
77	FW	(Georgia (country)) Giorgi Arabidze	0	0	0	0	0	0	0	0	0	0	0	0
