= Trojak (surname) =

Trojak or Troják (Slovak/Czech feminine: Trojáková) is a surname. Notable people with the surname include:

- Józef Trojak (1966–2014), Polish footballer
- Ladislav Troják (1914–1948), Slovak ice hockey player
- Marko Trojak (born 1988), Croatian footballer
- Miłosz Trojak (born 1994), Polish footballer
