= Joaquín Suárez (disambiguation) =

Joaquín Suárez was a Uruguayan politician.

Joaquín Suárez may also refer to:

- Joaquín Suárez (town), village in southern Uruguay named after the politician
- Joaquín Suárez (footballer) (born 2002), Venezuelan footballer
