= Trojak =

Trojak may refer to:

- Trojak (dance)
- Trojak (surname)
