= Hwang Byeong-geun =

South Korean footballer (born 1994)

Personal information
- Full name: Hwang Byeong-geun
- Date of birth: 14 June 1994 (age 32)
- Place of birth: Daejeon, South Korea
- Height: 1.93 m (6 ft 4 in)
- Position: Goalkeeper

Team information
- Current team: FC Anyang
- Number: 41

Senior career*
Years	Team	Apps	(Gls)
2015–2022	Jeonbuk Hyundai Motors	18	(0)
2019–2020	→ Sangju Sangmu (army)	8	(0)
2022	Jeonbuk Hyundai Motors B	11	(0)
2022–2024	Busan IPark	16	(0)
2025–	FC Anyang	4	(0)
- * Club domestic league appearances and goals as of 5 January 2026

Hwang Byeong-geun (Korean: 황병근; born 14 June 1994 in South Korea) is a South Korean footballer who plays for FC Anyang as a goalkeeper.

== Career ==
Hwang started his senior career with Jeonbuk Hyundai Motors in 2015.

He joined Sangju Sangmu in the South Korean K League 1 for his military service, in April 2019, where he has made six appearances.

On 1 July 2022, he moved to Busan IPark of K League 2.

== Career statistics ==
As of 9 September 2024.

Appearances and goals by club, season and competition
Club	Season	League			National Cup		Continental		Other		Total	
Club	Season	Division	Apps	Goals	Apps	Goals	Apps	Goals	Apps	Goals	Apps	Goals
Jeonbuk Hyundai Motors	2016	K League 1	3	0	0	0	0	0	0	0	3	0
Jeonbuk Hyundai Motors	2017	K League 1	8	0	0	0	—		—		8	0
Jeonbuk Hyundai Motors	2018	K League 1	7	0	2	0	1	0	—		10	0
Jeonbuk Hyundai Motors	2019	K League 1	0	0	0	0	0	0	—		0	0
Jeonbuk Hyundai Motors	2021	K League 1	0	0	0	0	1	0	—		1	0
Jeonbuk Hyundai Motors	2022	K League 1	0	0	0	0	0	0	—		0	0
Jeonbuk Hyundai Motors	Total		18	0	2	0	2	0	0	0	22	0
Sangju Sangmu (army)	2019	K League 1	2	0	0	0	—		—		2	0
Sangju Sangmu (army)	2020	K League 1	6	0	2	0	—		—		8	0
Sangju Sangmu (army)	Total		8	0	2	0	—		—		10	0
Busan IPark	2022	K League 2	9	0	—		—		—		9	0
Busan IPark	2023	K League 2	0	0	2	0	—		0	0	2	0
Busan IPark	2024	K League 2	7	0	2	0	—		0	0	9	0
Busan IPark	Total		16	0	4	0	—		0	0	20	0
Career total			42	0	8	0	2	0	0	0	52	0

== Honours ==
=== Club ===
Jeonbuk Hyundai Motors

- K League 1: 2015, 2017, 2018, 2021
- AFC Champions League: 2016
