= Hyundai High School =

Private high school in Seoul, South Korea

- 현대고등학교
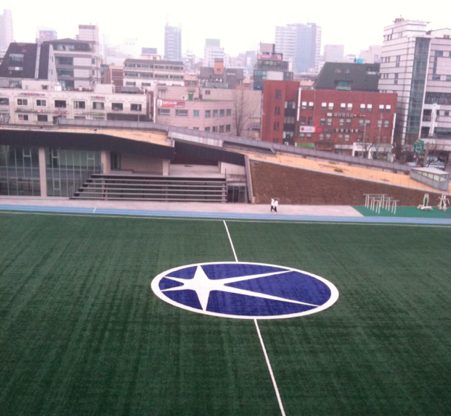

Location
- 127 Apgujeong-ro; Gangnam District, Seoul 06000; South Korea; 37°31′31″N 127°01′20″E

Information
- Type: Autonomous private high school
- Established: 1985
- Founder: Chung Ju-yung
- Principal: Kang Seung-won
- Faculty: 82
- Gender: Coeducational
- Enrollment: 1145
- Colors: Royal blue (symbol); Hookers Green (background)
- Foundation: Seoul Hyundai School Corporation
- Flower: Lilac
- Tree: Magnolia kobus
- Website: Hyundai High School Official Website

Korean name
- Hangul: 현대고등학교
- Hanja: 現代高等學校
- RR: Hyeondae godeunghakgyo
- MR: Hyŏndae kodŭnghakkyo

Hyundai High School (Korean: 현대고등학교; Hanja: 現代高等學校) is an autonomous private high school located in Apgujeong-dong, Gangnam-gu, Seoul, South Korea. The school was established by Hyundai Group (현대그룹), and the founder is Chung Ju-yung (정주영). The school acquired establishment permission on April 29, 1978, and opened in 1985.

== History ==
- 1978, April 29 - An educational foundation Seoul Hyundai Institute was established.
- 1978, April 29 - The first chief director of the foundation Chung Ju-yung was inaugurated.
- 1984, March 15 - The school acquired an establishment permission and started construction.
- 1984, June 25 - The third chief director of the foundation Choi Su-Il was inaugurated.
- 1985, January 16 - The fourth chief director of the foundation Jang Jung-Ja was inaugurated.
- 1985, March 4 - The school had an entrance ceremony. The first principal Jung Hee-Kyung was inaugurated.
- 1985, May 3 - The school celebrated the first school anniversary.
- 1988, February 12 - The first Graduation
- 2003, October 27 - Information Education Center in the school was opened.
- 2011, March 2 - The school converted to an autonomous private school(자율형 사립고등학교).

== Notable alumni ==
- Choi Si-won
- Heo Young-saeng
- Lee Eun-gyeol
- Lee Joo-heon
- Lee Jung-jae
- Lee Min-jung
- Noh Hong-chul
- Park Chan-yeol

== See also ==
- Education in South Korea
