= Matías Lacava =

Venezuelan footballer (born 2002)

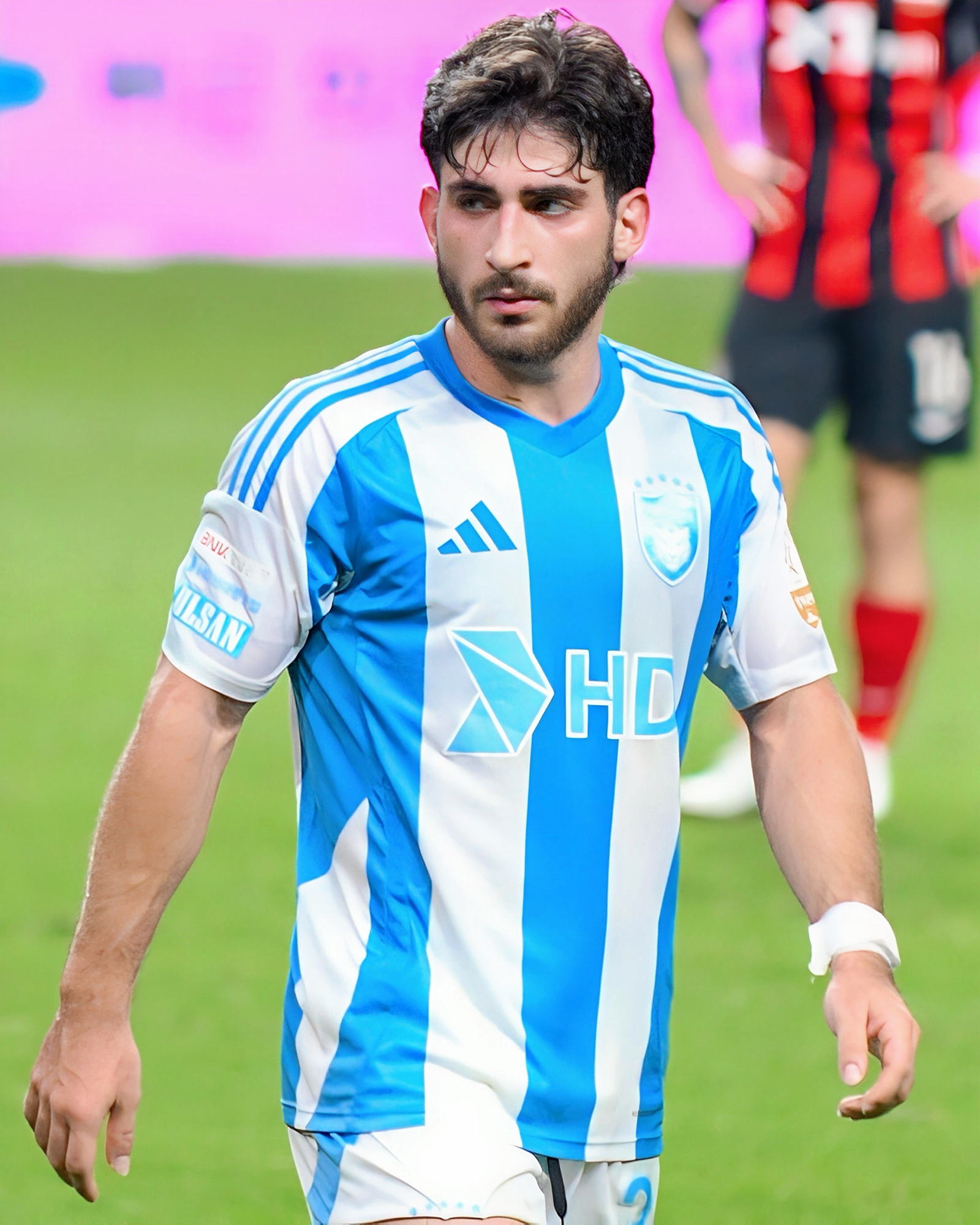
- Lacava in 2025

Personal information
- Full name: Matías Rafael Lacava González
- Date of birth: 24 October 2002 (age 24)
- Place of birth: Caracas, Venezuela
- Height: 1.68 m (5 ft 6 in)
- Position: Winger

Team information
- Current team: Vizela
- Number: 36

Youth career
- Fratelsa Sport
- 2013–2015: Barcelona
- 2015–2018: Lazio
- 2018–2019: Academia Puerto Cabello
- 2019: Benfica

Senior career*
Years	Team	Apps	(Gls)
2019	Benfica	0	(0)
2019–2024	Academia Puerto Cabello	42	(11)
2021–2022	→ Santos (loan)	2	(0)
2022–2023	→ Tondela (loan)	16	(1)
2023–2024	→ Vizela (loan)	38	(2)
2024	→ Atlético Goianiense (loan)	12	(0)
2025–2026	Ulsan HD	24	(2)
2026–	Vizela	13	(1)

International career^{‡}
2019	Venezuela U17	1	(0)
2020–	Venezuela U23	3	(0)
2022–2023	Venezuela U20	4	(0)
2024–	Venezuela	4	(0)
- * Club domestic league appearances and goals as of 19 June 2026 ‡ National team caps and goals as of 23:11 AEST, 14 November 2025

Matías Rafael Lacava González (born 24 October 2002) is a Venezuelan professional footballer who plays as a winger for Liga Portugal 2 club Vizela and the Venezuela national team.

== Club career ==
=== Early career ===
Born in Chacao, Caracas, Lacava joined FC Barcelona's La Masia in 2013, aged ten, from hometown side Fratelsa Sport FC. He left the club in 2015 after having "contractual problems", and moved to Lazio.

In the 2018 summer, Lacava left Lazio and returned to his home country with Academia Puerto Cabello. On 16 January 2019, under the authorization of FIFA, he signed a youth contract with S.L. Benfica, but returned to Puerto Cabello in July.

=== Academia Puerto Cabello ===
Lacava made his first team debut for Academia Puerto Cabello on 28 July 2019, coming on as a half-time substitute for Joaquín Suárez in a 2–1 home loss against Aragua. He scored his first professional goals six days later, netting a brace in a 3–2 away win against Metropolitanos; it was his first start as a senior.

==== Loan to Santos ====
On 3 August 2021, Lacava joined Campeonato Brasileiro Série A side Santos on loan until December 2022, and was initially assigned to the under-23 team. He made his first team debut on 13 November, replacing Marcos Guilherme in a 0–0 away draw against Atlético Goianiense.

On 31 January 2022, Santos announced that Lacava's loan was terminated on a "mutual agreement".

==== Loan to Tondela ====
On 31 January 2022, just hours after leaving Santos, Lacava returned to Portugal after agreeing to a six-month loan deal with Tondela. On 27 June 2023, Vizela announced that the loan would be extended for another season, until June 2024.

== International career ==
Lacava represented Venezuela at under-17 and under-23 levels in the 2019 South American U-17 Championship and the 2020 CONMEBOL Pre-Olympic Tournament, respectively. On 31 May 2021, he was called up to the full side by manager José Peseiro for two 2022 FIFA World Cup qualification matches against Bolivia and Uruguay.

== Personal life ==
Lacava is the son of Carabobo state governor Rafael Lacava, who was sanctioned by the U.S. Treasury's Office of Foreign Assets Control (OFAC) in February 2019. The sanctions were imposed because he was considered an official aligned with the Maduro regime, involved in corruption, and for allegedly blocking the delivery of humanitarian aid.

== Career statistics ==
=== Club ===
As of match played 5 October 2025

Appearances and goals by club, season and competition
Club	Season	League			Cup		League cup		Continental		Other		Total	
Club	Season	Division	Apps	Goals	Apps	Goals	Apps	Goals	Apps	Goals	Apps	Goals	Apps	Goals
Academia Puerto Cabello	2019	Venezuelan Primera División	15	4	3	1	—		—		—		18	5
Academia Puerto Cabello	2020	Venezuelan Primera División	19	7	—		—		—		—		19	7
Academia Puerto Cabello	2021	Venezuelan Primera División	8	0	—		—		2 (Note: Appearance(s) in Copa Sudamericana)	0	—		10	0
Academia Puerto Cabello	Total		42	11	3	1	—		2	0	—		47	12
Santos (loan)	2021	Série A	2	0	—		—		—		5 (Note: Appearance(s) in Copa Paulista)	0	7	0
Tondela (loan)	2021–22	Primeira Liga	3	0	1	0	—		—		—		4	0
Tondela (loan)	2022–23	Liga Portugal 2	13	1	3	0	4 (Note: Appearances in Taça da Liga)	0	—		5 (Note: Appearance in Supertaça Cândido de Oliveira)	0	21	1
Tondela (loan)	Total		16	1	4	0	4	0	—		1	0	25	1
Vizela (loan)	2022–23	Primeira Liga	15	1	—		—		—		—		15	1
Vizela (loan)	2023–24	Primeira Liga	20	0	2	0	2	0	—		—		24	0
Vizela (loan)	2024–25	Primeira Liga	3	1	—		—		—		—		3	1
Vizela (loan)	Total		38	2	2	0	2	0	—		—		42	2
Atlético Goianiense (loan)	2024	Série A	12	0	—		—		—		—		12	0
Ulsan HD	2025	K League 1	24	1	—		2	0	3 (Note: Appearances in AFC Champions League Elite)	0	3 (Note: Appearances in FIFA Club World Cup)	0	29	1
Vizela	2025–26	Liga Portugal 2	2	0	—		—		—		—		2	0
Career total			136	15	9	1	8	0	5	0	13	0	168	16

=== International ===
As of match played 14 November 2025

Appearances and goals by national team and year
National team	Year	Apps	Goals
Venezuela	2024	2	0
Venezuela	2025	2	0
Total		4	0
