= Józef Trojak =

Polish footballer (1966–2014)

Personal information
- Date of birth: 21 March 1966
- Place of birth: Grębanin, Poland
- Date of death: 4 February 2014 (aged 47)
- Place of death: Wałbrzych, Poland
- Height: 1.87 m (6 ft 2 in)
- Position: Defender

Senior career*
Years	Team	Apps	(Gls)
- LKS Jankowy
1984–1989	Górnik Wałbrzych	28	(0)
1989	Śląsk Wrocław	8	(0)
1990	Górnik Wałbrzych		
1991	LKS Jankowy		
- * Club domestic league appearances and goals

Józef Trojak (21 March 1966 – 4 February 2014) was a Polish footballer who played as a defender.

Trojak made his debut for Górnik Wałbrzych in 1983. The team won the First League that year. He stayed for six years at the club, then transferred to Śląsk Wrocław for a year. At the end of the 1989–90 season, he returned to Wałbrzych, where he retired at the end of the 1990–91 season at the age of 35. He went on to become a coach.

He died after suffering a heart failure on 4 February 2014 in Wałbrzych at the age of 47.

His son Miłosz is a professional footballer, currently playing for Ekstraklasa club Korona Kielce.
