= Cho Hyun-taek =

South Korean footballer (born 2001)

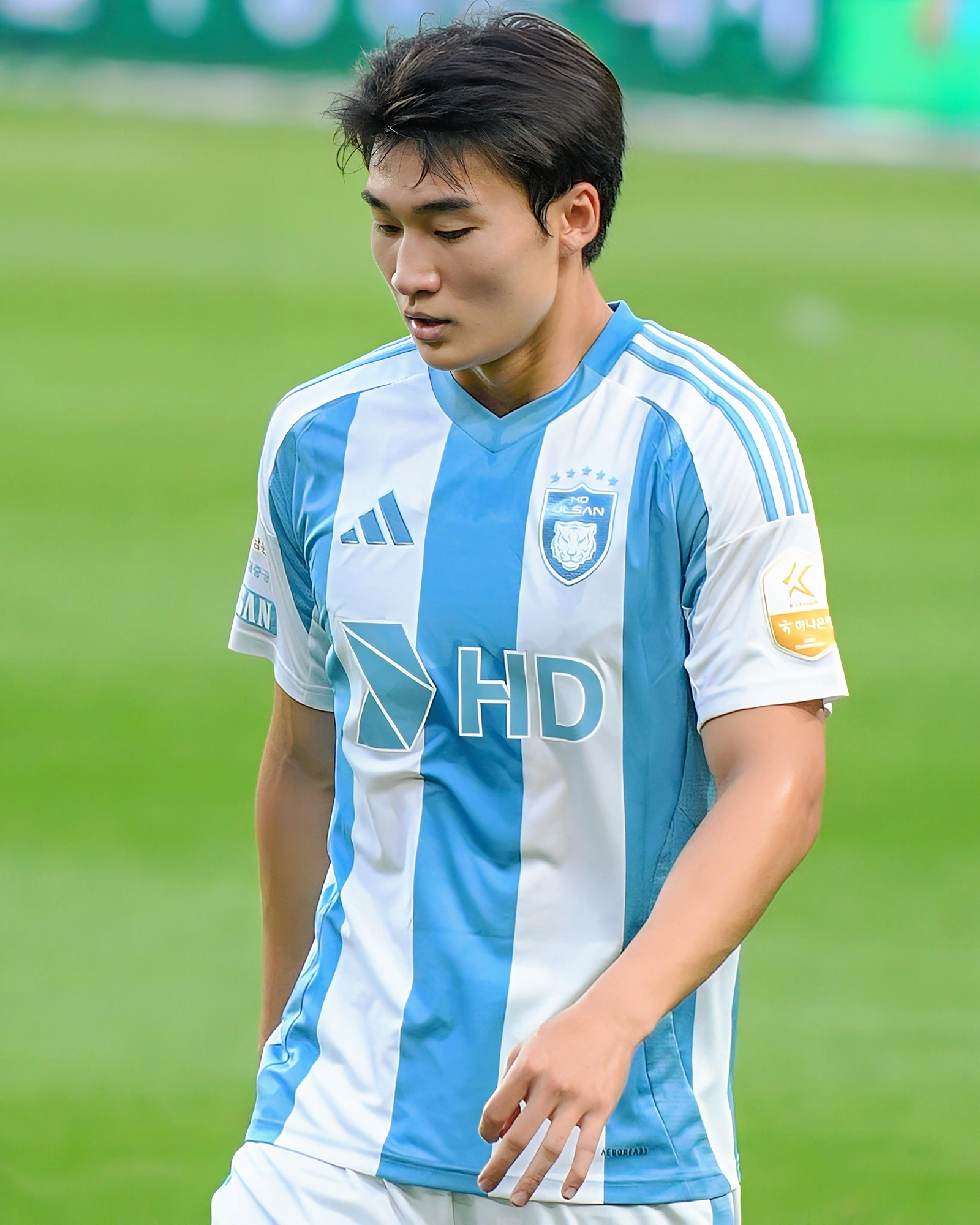
- Cho in 2025

Personal information
- Date of birth: 2 August 2001 (age 25)
- Place of birth: Goyang, Gyeonggi, South Korea
- Height: 1.82 m (6 ft 0 in)
- Position: Left back

Team information
- Current team: Ulsan HD
- Number: 26

Youth career
- 2017–2019: Shingal High School

Senior career*
Years	Team	Apps	(Gls)
2020–	Ulsan HD	74	(1)
2021–2022	→ Bucheon FC 1995 (loan)	63	(7)
2024–2025	→ Gimcheon Sangmu (draft)	30	(1)

International career^{‡}
2019	South Korea U20	8	(1)
2022–	South Korea U23	16	(2)
2025–	South Korea	7	(0)
- * Club domestic league appearances and goals as of 8 November 2026 ‡ National team caps and goals as of 17 November 2026

- Cho Hyun-taek
- Hangul: 조현택
- RR: Jo Hyeontaek
- MR: Cho Hyŏnt'aek

Cho Hyun-taek (Korean: 조현택; born 2 August 2001) is a South Korean footballer who plays as a left back for Ulsan HD in the K League 1 and the South Korea national team.

== Club career ==
On 10 January 2020, Cho joined Ulsan as a free agent rookie.

On 30 December 2020, Cho was loaned to Bucheon FC 1995 of K League 2.

On 10 January 2023, Cho returns to Ulsan.

== International career ==
On 10 March 2025, He was called up to the South Korea national football team for the first time and participated 2026 FIFA World Cup qualification in March 2025.

== Career statistics ==
=== Club ===
As of 8 November 2026

Appearances and goals by club, season and competition
Club	Season	League			Cup		Continental		Other		Total	
Club	Season	Division	Apps	Goals	Apps	Goals	Apps	Goals	Apps	Goals	Apps	Goals
Bucheon FC 1995 (loan)	2021	K League 2	30	1	2	0	—		—		32	1
Bucheon FC 1995 (loan)	2022	K League 2	33	6	0	0	—		1 (Note: Appearances in K League promotion play-offs)	0	34	6
Bucheon FC 1995 (loan)	Total		63	7	2	0	—		1	0	66	7
Ulsan HD	2023	K League 1	30	0	1	0	2 (Note: Appearances in AFC Champions League Elite)	0	—		33	0
Ulsan HD	2025	K League 1	11	1	1	0	4	0	—		16	1
Ulsan HD	2026	K League 1	33	0	0	0	2	0	—		35	0
Ulsan HD	Total		74	1	2	0	8	0	—		84	1
Gimcheon Sangmu (draft)	2024	K League 1	12	0	1	0	—		—		13	0
Gimcheon Sangmu (draft)	2025	K League 1	18	1	0	0	—		—		18	1
Gimcheon Sangmu (draft)	Total		30	1	1	0	—		—		31	1
Career total			167	9	5	0	8	0	1	0	181	9

=== International ===
As of match played 17 November 2026

Appearances and goals by national team and year
National team	Year	Apps	Goals
South Korea
South Korea	2025	1	0
South Korea	2026	6	0
Total		7	0

== Honours ==
Ulsan HD

- K League 1: 2023
