= Heo Yool (footballer) =

South Korean footballer (born 2001)

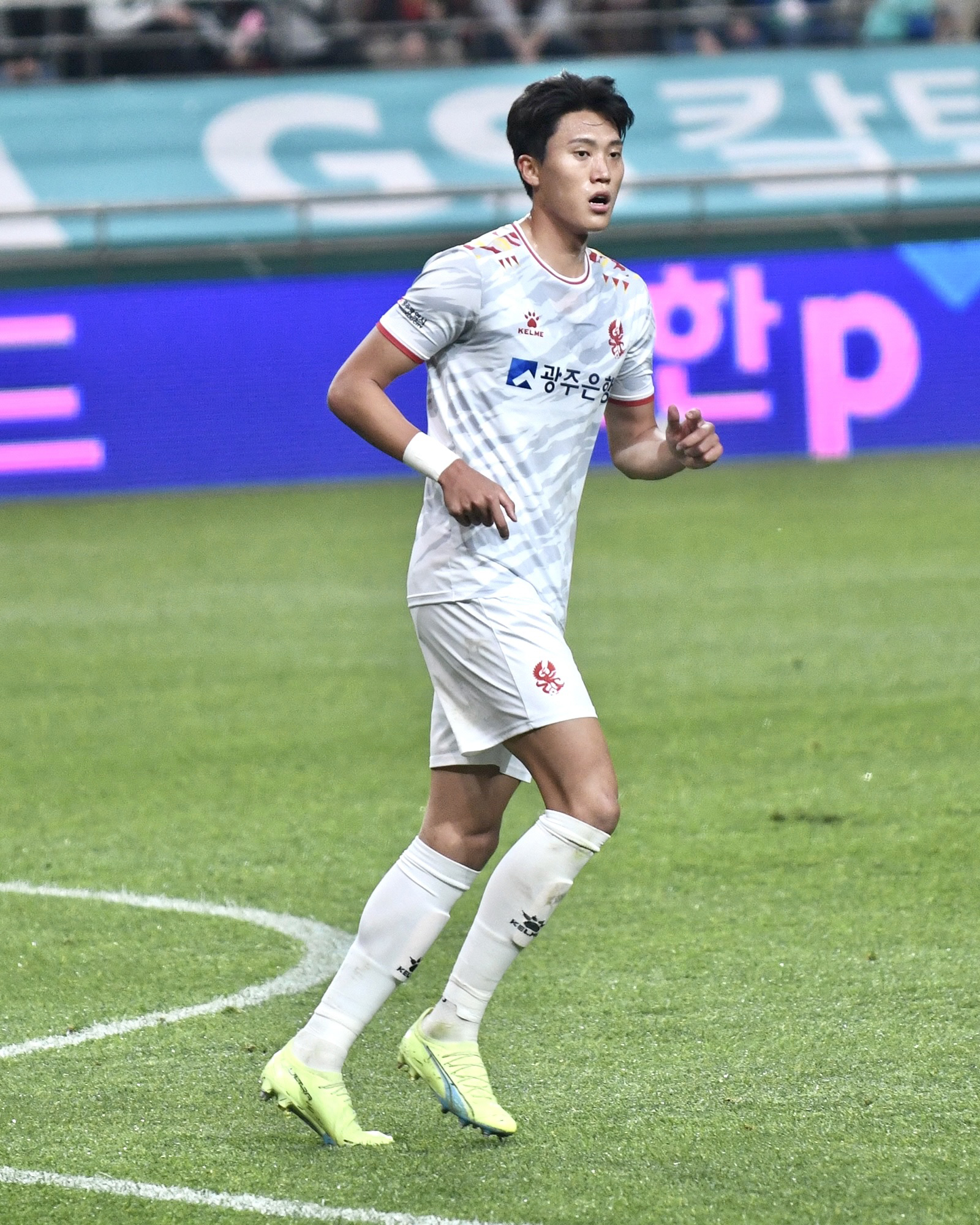
- Heo with Gwangju in 2023

Personal information
- Full name: Heo Yool
- Date of birth: 12 April 2001 (age 25)
- Place of birth: Gwangju, South Korea
- Height: 1.93 m (6 ft 4 in)
- Position: Striker

Team information
- Current team: Ulsan HD
- Number: 18

Youth career
- 2010–2014: Wolgok Elementary School
- 2014–2017: Gwangju Buksung Middle School
- 2017–2020: Kumho High School

Senior career*
Years	Team	Apps	(Gls)
2020–2024	Gwangju FC	116	(13)
2025–	Ulsan HD	26	(4)

International career^{‡}
2016	South Korea U17	5	(1)
2019	South Korea U20	5	(3)
2023–	South Korea U23	5	(0)
- * Club domestic league appearances and goals as of 5 January 2026 ‡ National team caps and goals as of 12 September 2023 (UTC)

Heo Yool (Korean: 허율; born 12 April 2001) is a South Korean professional footballer who plays as a striker for K League 1 side Ulsan HD.

== Club career ==
Heo made his professional debut for K League 1 side Gwangju on 30 May 2021 against Pohang Steelers.

== play style ==
Heo Yool drew attention for his ability to control the right to provide and dribble as a tall striker.

However, his offense failed to explode, so his team Gwangju tried to change his position to a defender by taking advantage of his left-footed advantage with special measures.

He now plays as a utility player who can play both as striker and defender according to the situation.

== Career statistics ==
=== Club ===
As of match played 17 September 2025

Appearances and goals by club, season and competition
Club	Season	League			National cup		Continental		Other		Total	
Club	Season	Division	Apps	Goals	Apps	Goals	Apps	Goals	Apps	Goals	Apps	Goals
Gwangju FC	2020	K League 1	0	0	1	0	—		—		1	0
Gwangju FC	2021	K League 1	18	2	0	0	—		—		18	2
Gwangju FC	2022	K League 2	33	6	1	1	—		—		34	7
Gwangju FC	2023	K League 1	33	3	3	1	—		—		36	4
Gwangju FC	2024	K League 1	32	2	0	0	5 (Note: Appearances in AFC Champions League Elite)	1	—		37	3
Gwangju FC	Total		116	13	5	2	5	1	—		126	16
Ulsan HD	2025	K League 1	19	4	2	1	1	1	2 (Note: Appearances in FIFA Club World Cup)	0	24	6
Career total			135	17	7	3	6	2	2	0	150	22
