= Kim Min-hyeok (footballer, born August 1992) =

South Korean footballer (born 1992)

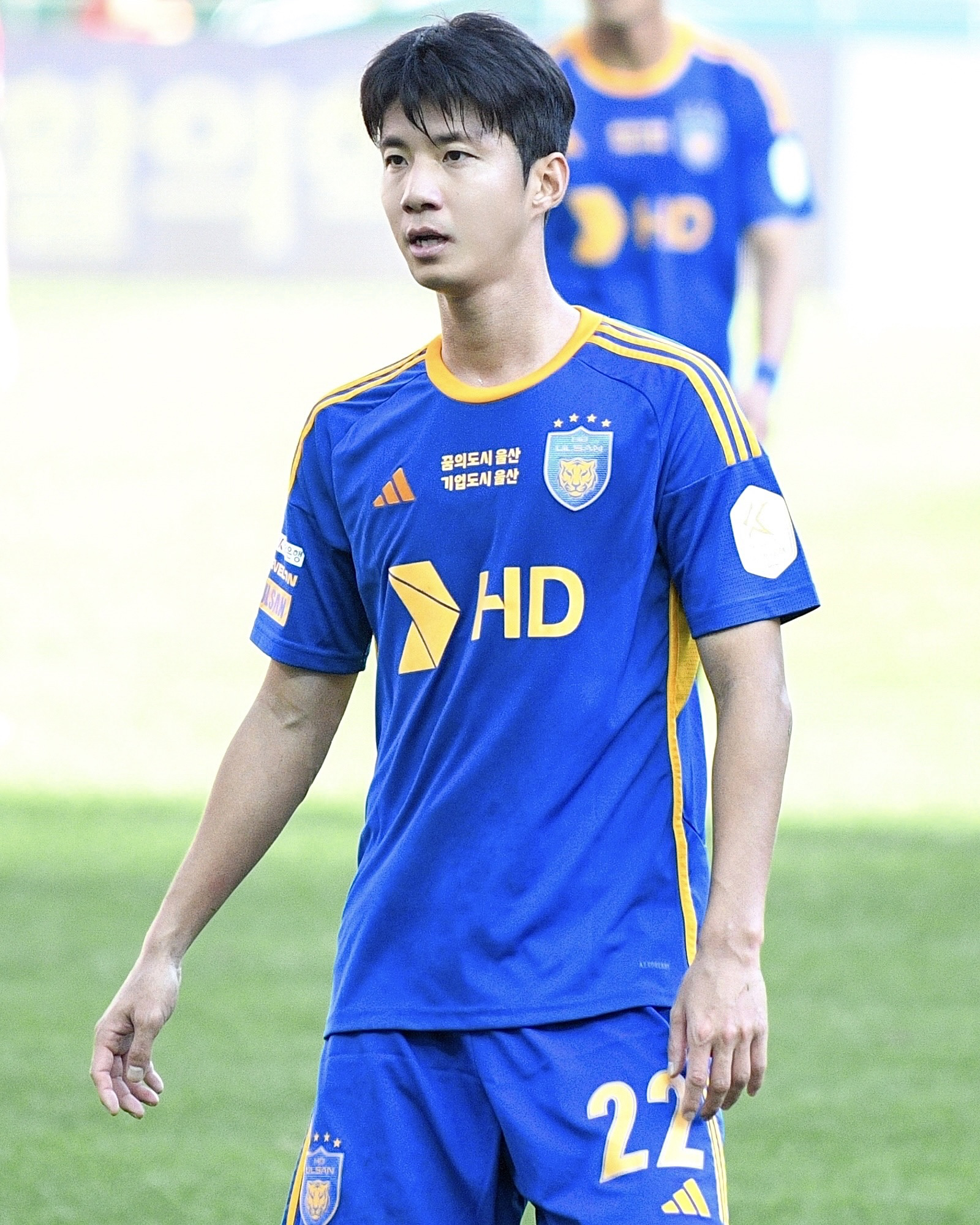
- Kim with Ulsan Hyundai in 2024

Personal information
- Date of birth: 16 August 1992 (age 34)
- Place of birth: Seoul, South Korea
- Height: 1.82 m (5 ft 11 1/2 in)
- Position: Midfielder

Team information
- Current team: Busan IPark
- Number: 8

Youth career
- 2011–2014: Kwangwoon University

Senior career*
| Years | Team | Apps | (Gls) |
| 2015 | FC Seoul | 6 | (0) |
| 2016–2017 | Gwangju FC | 70 | (5) |
| 2018 | Pohang Steelers | 2 | (0) |
| 2018–2022 | Seongnam FC | 78 | (8) |
| 2019–2020 | → Sangju Sangmu (army) | 53 | (3) |
| 2023–2025 | Ulsan Hyundai | 61 | (2) |
| 2026– | Busan IPark | 17 | (4) |
- * Club domestic league appearances and goals as of 5 August 2026

- Kim Min-hyeok
- Hangul: 김민혁
- RR: Gim Minhyeok
- MR: Kim Minhyŏk

Kim Min-hyeok (Korean: 김민혁; born 16 August 1992) is a South Korean professional footballer who plays as a midfielder for Busan IPark.

== Career ==
He made his debut for Ulsan Hyundai in the group stages of 2015 AFC Champions League.

== Honours ==
Ulsan HD

- K League 1: 2023, 2024
