= Ko Seung-beom =

South Korean footballer

Ko Seung-beom 고승범
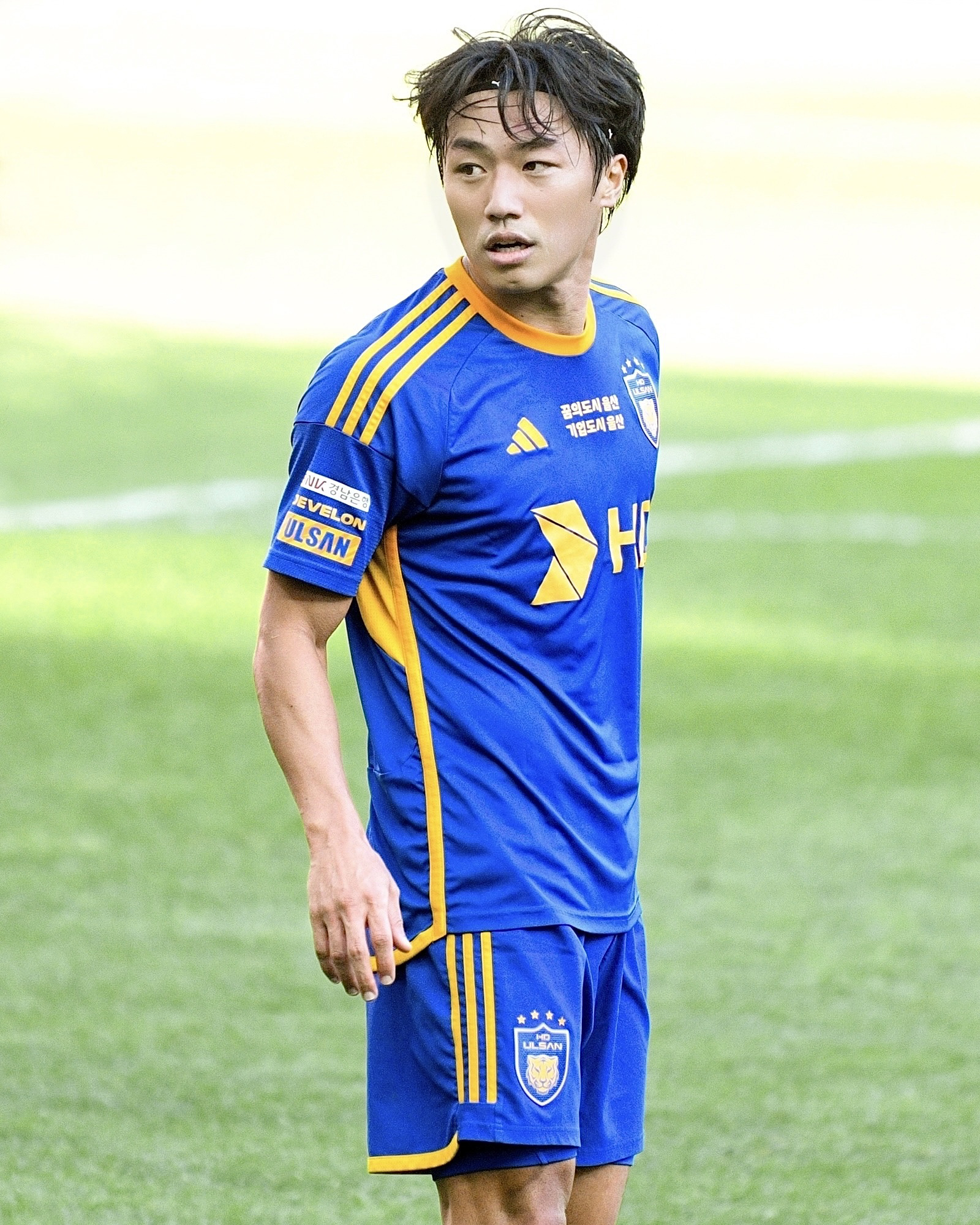
- Ko in 2024

Personal information
- Date of birth: 24 April 1994 (age 32)
- Place of birth: Jeju, Jeju-do, South Korea
- Height: 1.74 m (5 ft 9 in)
- Positions: Midfielder; winger

Team information
- Current team: Suwon Samsung Bluewings
- Number: 24

Youth career
- Kyunghee University

Senior career*
Years	Team	Apps	(Gls)
2016–2023	Suwon Samsung Bluewings	125	(8)
2018	→ Daegu FC (loan)	9	(0)
2021–2022	→ Gimcheon Sangmu (draft)	33	(3)
2024–2026	Ulsan HD	57	(7)
2026–	Suwon Samsung Bluewings	15	(1)

International career^{‡}
2015	South Korea Universiade	6	(0)
2022–	South Korea	3	(0)
- * Club domestic league appearances and goals as of 5 August 2026 ‡ National team caps and goals as of 14 June 2022

Ko Seung-beom (Korean: 고승범; born 24 April 1994) is a South Korean footballer who plays as midfielder or a winger for K League 2 club Suwon Samsung Bluewings.

== Career ==
Ko played college football for Kyunghee University.

Ko joined the K League 1 side Suwon Samsung Bluewings before the 2016 season began.

== Career statistics ==
=== Club ===
As of match played 25 June 2025.

Appearances and goals by club, season and competition
Club	Season	League			Cup		Continental		Other		Total	
Club	Season	Division	Apps	Goals	Apps	Goals	Apps	Goals	Apps	Goals	Apps	Goals
Suwon Samsung Bluewings	2016	K League 1	13	0	4	0	1 (Note: Appearances in AFC Champions League (Elite))	0	—		18	0
Suwon Samsung Bluewings	2017	K League 1	33	2	3	0	3	2	—		39	4
Suwon Samsung Bluewings	2019	K League 1	10	0	2	2	—				12	2
Suwon Samsung Bluewings	2020	K League 1	22	3	2	0	6	0	—		30	3
Suwon Samsung Bluewings	2021	K League 1	15	1	0	0	—		—		15	1
Suwon Samsung Bluewings	2023	K League 1	32	2	0	0	—		—		32	2
Suwon Samsung Bluewings	Total		125	8	11	2	10	2	—		146	12
Daegu FC (loan)	2018	K League 1	9	0	0	0	—		—		9	0
Gimcheon Sangmu (draft)	2021	K League 2	10	3	1	0	—		—		11	3
Gimcheon Sangmu (draft)	2022	K League 1	23	0	1	0	—		2 (Note: Appearance in K League promotion-relegation playoffs)	0	26	0
Gimcheon Sangmu (draft)	Total		33	3	2	0	—		2	0	37	3
Ulsan HD	2024	K League 1	28	4	3	0	11	0	—		42	4
Ulsan HD	2025	K League 1	14	0	0	0	—		3 (Note: Appearance in FIFA Club World Cup)	0	17	0
Ulsan HD	Total		42	4	3	0	11	0	3	0	59	4
Career total			209	12	16	2	21	2	5	0	251	15

== Honors ==
Suwon Samsung Bluewings

- Korean FA Cup: 2016, 2019

Ulsan HD

- K League 1: 2024

Individual

- Korean FA Cup Most Valuable Player: 2019
- K League 1 Best XI: 2024
