= Yoon Jong-gyu =

South Korean footballer (born 1998)

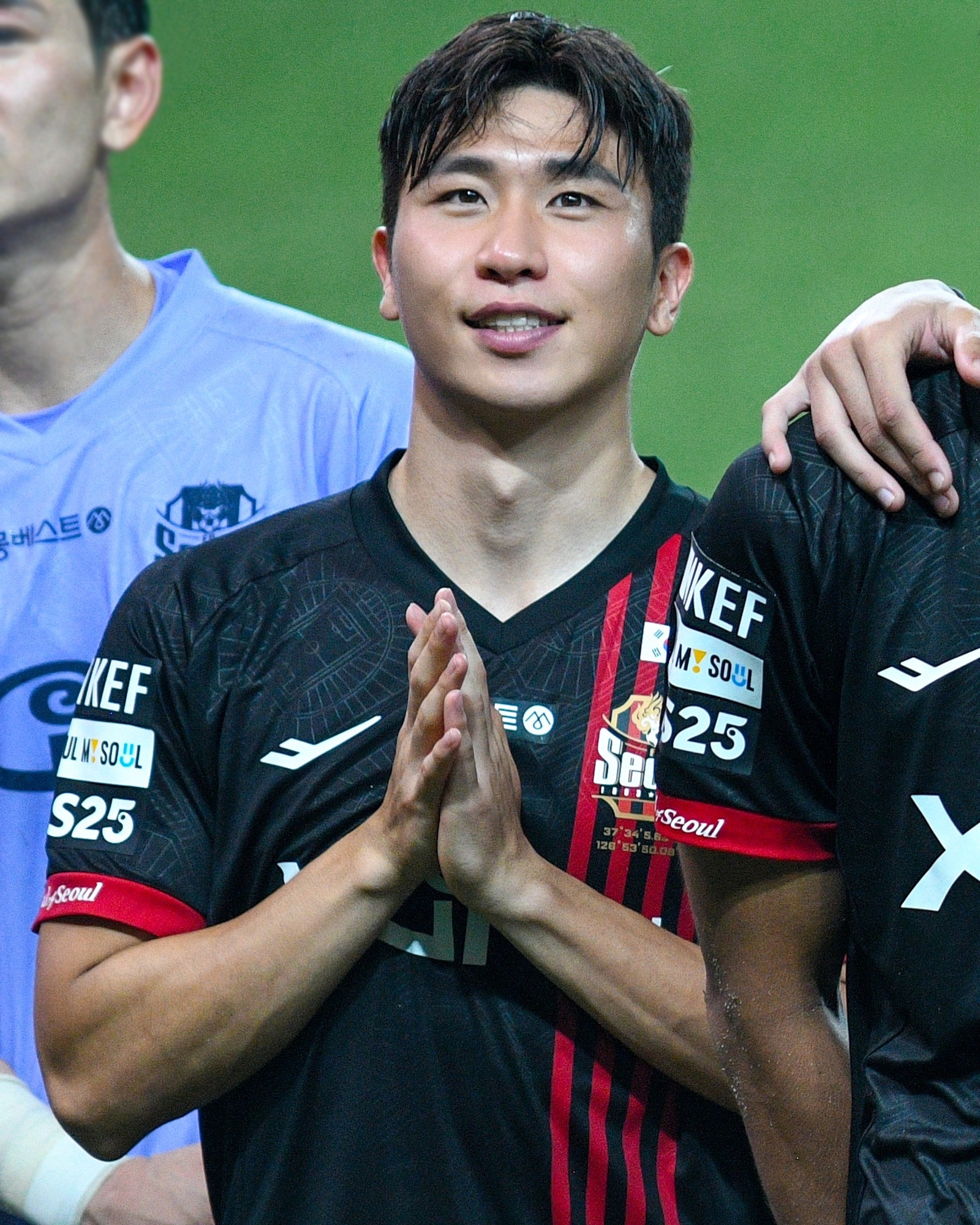
- Yoon in 2024

Personal information
- Date of birth: 20 March 1998 (age 28)
- Place of birth: South Korea
- Height: 1.75 m (5 ft 9 in)
- Position: Full-back

Team information
- Current team: Ulsan HD
- Number: 24

Youth career
- 2014–2016: Shingal High School

Senior career*
Years	Team	Apps	(Gls)
2017–2024	FC Seoul	115	(2)
2017	→ Gyeongnam FC (loan)	5	(0)
2023–2024	→ Gimcheon Sangmu (draft)	38	(2)
2025–	Ulsan HD	15	(0)

International career^{‡}
2015	South Korea U17	6 (Note: Includes two appearances three goals against non-national team.)	(3)
2016–2017	South Korea U20	14	(1)
2017–2021	South Korea U23	11 (Note: Includes one appearance against another KFA team.)	(0)
2020–	South Korea	4	(0)
Medal record
Men's football
Representing South Korea
EAFF Championship
Runner-up	2022 Japan	Team
AFC U-23 Championship
Gold medal – first place	2020 Thailand
- * Club domestic league appearances and goals as of 3 August 2026 ‡ National team caps and goals as of 11 November 2022

- Yoon Jong-gyu
- Hangul: 윤종규
- Hanja: 尹鍾奎
- RR: Yun Jonggyu
- MR: Yun Chonggyu

Yoon Jong-gyu (Korean: 윤종규; born 20 March 1998) is a South Korean football defender who plays for Ulsan HD and the South Korea national team.

== Club career ==
Jong-gyu joined FC Seoul in 2017.

He joined Ulsan HD FC in 2025.

== International career ==
He was part of the South Korea U-17 squad at the 2015 FIFA U-17 World Cup.

He was part of the South Korea U-20 squad at the 2017 FIFA U-20 World Cup.

He was part of the South Korea squad at the 2022 EAFF E-1 Football Championship.

He was part of the South Korea squad at the 2022 FIFA World Cup.

== Career statistics ==
=== Club ===
As of 22 November 2025

Club performance			League		Cup		Continental		Play-off		Total	
Season	Club	League	Apps	Goals	Apps	Goals	Apps	Goals	Apps	Goals	Apps	Goals
Gyeongnam FC (loan)	2017	K League 2	5	0	0	0	—		—		5	0
FC Seoul	2018	K League 1	5	0	0	0	—		2	0	7	0
FC Seoul	2019	K League 1	29	0	1	0	—		—		30	0
FC Seoul	2020	K League 1	17	0	1	0	0	0	—		18	0
FC Seoul	2021	K League 1	32	1	0	0	—		—		32	1
FC Seoul	2022	K League 1	32	1	5	0	—		—		37	1
FC Seoul	Total		115	2	7	0	0	0	2	0	124	2
Gimcheon Sangmu (draft)	2023	K League 2	17	2	0	0	—		—		17	2
Gimcheon Sangmu (draft)	2024	K League 1	21	0	1	0	—		—		22	0
Gimcheon Sangmu (draft)	Total		38	2	1	0	0	0	0	0	39	2
Ulsan HD	2025	K League 1	11	0	1	0	—		—		12	0
Career total			169	4	9	0	0	0	2	0	180	4

== Honours ==
=== International ===
South Korea U23

- AFC U-23 Championship: 2020
