= Lee Kyu-seong =

South Korean footballer (born 1994)

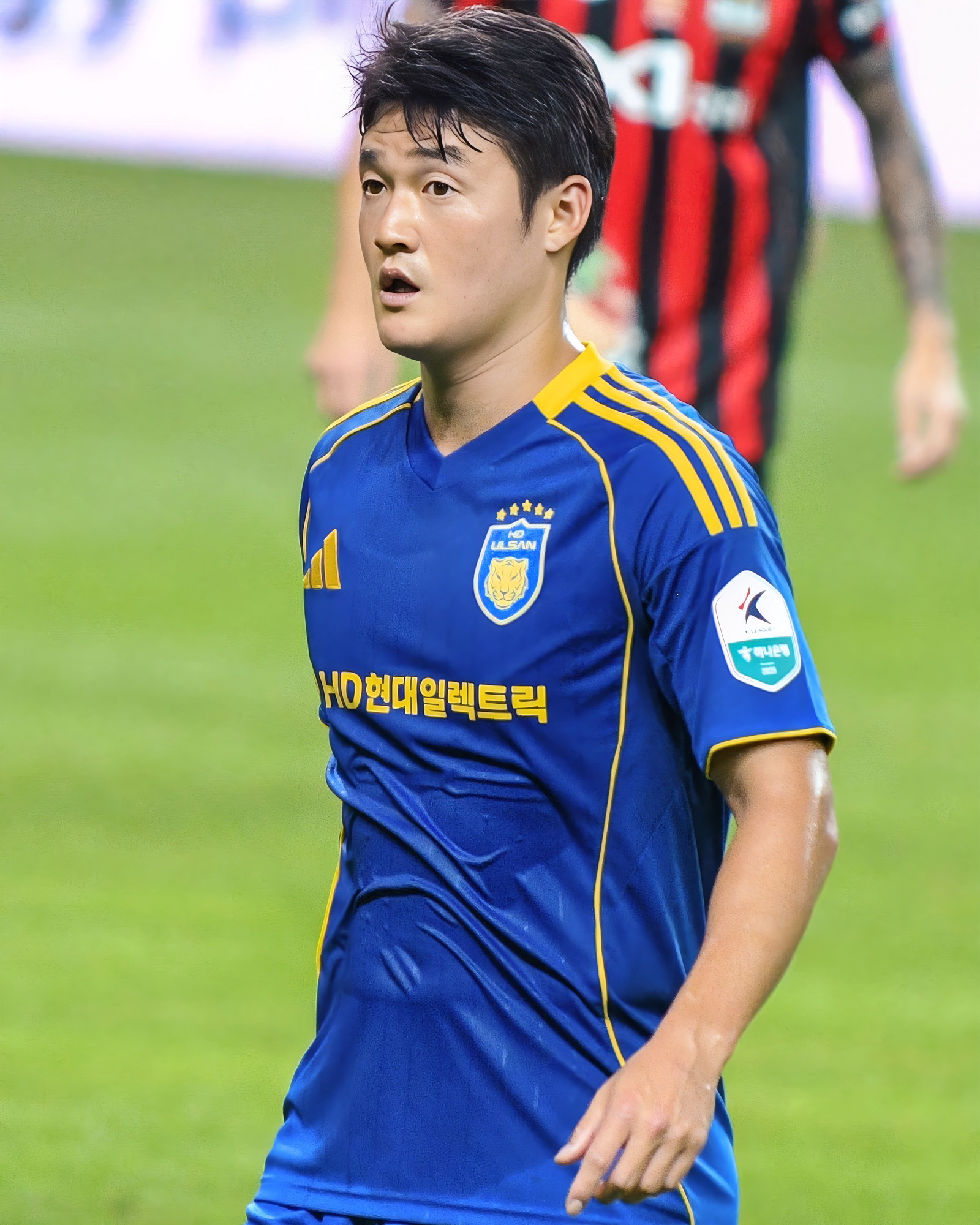
- Lee in 2026

Personal information
- Date of birth: 10 May 1994 (age 32)
- Place of birth: Yangpyeong-gun, Gyeonggi, South Korea
- Height: 1.74 m (5 ft 9 in)
- Position: Midfielder

Team information
- Current team: Ulsan Hyundai
- Number: 24

Senior career*
Years	Team	Apps	(Gls)
2015–2022	Busan I'Park	97	(6)
2018–2019	→ Sangju Sangmu (army)	47	(0)
2021–	Ulsan Hyundai	108	(1)
2021	→ Seongnam FC (loan)	32	(0)
2025	→ Suwon Samsung Bluewings (loan)	33	(1)
- * Club domestic league appearances and goals as of 3 August 2026

- Lee Kyu-seong
- Hangul: 이규성
- Hanja: 李奎成
- RR: I Gyuseong
- MR: I Kyusŏng

Lee Kyu-seong (Korean: 이규성; born 10 May 1994) is a South Korean football player who currently plays as a midfielder for Ulsan Hyundai in the K League 1.

== Career ==
Lee made his professional debut for Busan IPark on 27 June 2015 against Jeju United. He marked his debut with an early goal, although Busan went on to lose the game 3-1. Lee went on to become a regular in the side for the remainder of the season as Busan were relegated to the K League 2. Lee joined K League 1 side Sangju Sangmu on 28 May 2018 to complete his military service, and returned to his parent club in January 2020. In 2021, Lee joined Ulsan Hyundai, but he was immediately loaned to Seongnam FC. After one season with Seongnam, Lee returned to Ulsan and was a regular in central midfield as Ulsan won the 2022 K League 1 title. Lee was shortlisted for the K League Best XI for his performances in Ulsan's title-winning season.

== Career statistics ==
As of 23 October 2022

Appearances and goals by club, season and competition
Club performance			League		National cup		Continental		Other		Total	
Season	Club	League	Apps	Goals	Apps	Goals	Apps	Goals	Apps	Goals	Apps	Goals
South Korea			League		KFA Cup		ACL		Play-offs		Total	
2015	Busan IPark	K League 1	18	1	0	0	0	0	2	0	20	1
2016	Busan IPark	K League 2	32	1	2	0	0	0	0	0	34	1
2017	Busan IPark	K League 2	15	3	4	0	0	0	0	0	19	3
2018	Busan IPark	K League 2	8	0	0	0	0	0	0	0	8	0
2018	Sangju Sangmu	K League 1	12	0	0	0	0	0	0	0	12	0
2019	Sangju Sangmu	K League 1	35	0	2	0	0	0	0	0	37	0
2020	Busan IPark	K League 1	24	1	2	0	0	0	0	0	26	1
2021	Seongnam FC	K League 1	32	0	0	0	0	0	0	0	32	0
2022	Ulsan Hyundai	K League 1	31	1	2	0	6	0	0	0	39	1
Career total			207	7	12	0	6	0	2	0	227	7

== Honours ==
=== Club ===
Ulsan Hyundai

- K League 1: 2022, 2023, 2024
