= Sim Sang-min =

South Korean footballer (born 1993)

Personal information
- Date of birth: 21 May 1993 (age 33)
- Place of birth: South Korea
- Height: 1.72 m (5 ft 7 1/2 in)
- Position: Full-back

Team information
- Current team: Ulsan HD
- Number: 77

Youth career
- 2009–2011: Bukyeong High School
- 2012–2013: Chung-Ang University

Senior career*
Years	Team	Apps	(Gls)
2014–2018	FC Seoul	47	(0)
2016	→ Seoul E-Land (loan)	13	(1)
2019–2024	Pohang Steelers	81	(0)
2020–2021	→ Sangju / Gimcheon Sangmu (draft)	27	(0)
2024–	Ulsan HD	20	(0)
2025	→ Gwangju FC (loan)	19	(0)

International career^{‡}
2011–2013	South Korea U20	21	(0)
2014–2016	South Korea U23	31	(0)
2020–	South Korea	0	(0)
- * Club domestic league appearances and goals as of 3 August 2026 ‡ National team caps and goals as of 8 October 2020

- Sim Sang-min
- Hangul: 심상민
- Hanja: 沈相旼
- RR: Sim Sangmin
- MR: Sim Sangmin

Sim Sang-min (Korean: 심상민; born 3 May 1993) is a South Korean footballer who plays as a defender for Ulsan HD.

He played at 2013 FIFA U-20 World Cup and joined FC Seoul in 2014.

== Career statistics ==
=== Club ===
As of 23 October 2022

Club performance			League		Cup		Continental		Total	
Season	Club	League	Apps	Goals	Apps	Goals	Apps	Goals	Apps	Goals
South Korea			League		FA Cup		Asia		Total	
2014	FC Seoul	K League 1	2	0	1	0	1	0	4	0
2015	FC Seoul	K League 1	12	0	2	0	0	0	14	0
2016	FC Seoul	K League 1	4	0	1	0	1	0	6	0
2016	Seoul E-Land (loan)	K League 2	13	1	—		—		13	1
2017	FC Seoul	K League 1	13	0	1	0	2	0	16	0
2018	FC Seoul	K League 1	16	0	0	0	—		16	0
2019	Pohang Steelers	K League 1	26	0	0	0	—		26	0
2020	Pohang Steelers	K League 1	3	0	—		—		3	0
2020	Sangju Sangmu; Gimcheon Sangmu (draft)	K League 1	10	0	2	0	—		12	0
2021	Sangju Sangmu; Gimcheon Sangmu (draft)	K League 2	17	0	0	0	—		17	0
2021	Pohang Steelers	K League 1	2	0	0	0	0	0	2	0
2022	Pohang Steelers	K League 1	29	0	3	0	—		32	0
2023	Pohang Steelers	K League 1	0	0	0	0	0	0	0	0
Country	South Korea		147	1	10	0	4	0	157	1
Career total			147	1	10	0	4	0	157	1

== Honours ==
=== Club ===
FC Seoul

- Korean FA Cup : 2015

Ulsan HD

- K League 1 : 2024

=== International ===
South Korea U20

- AFC U-19 Championship: 2012

South Korea U23

- King's Cup: 2015
