= Joaquín Suárez (footballer) =

Venezuelan footballer (born 2002)

Personal information
- Full name: Joaquín Alejandro Suárez Urbani
- Date of birth: 4 July 2002 (age 24)
- Place of birth: Valencia, Venezuela
- Height: 1.85 m (6 ft 1 in)
- Position: Defender

Team information
- Current team: Academia Puerto Cabello

Senior career*
Years	Team	Apps	(Gls)
2019–	Academia Puerto Cabello	1	(0)

International career^{‡}
2019	Venezuela U17	1	(0)
- * Club domestic league appearances and goals as of 20:11, 21 January 2020 (UTC) ‡ National team caps and goals as of 20:11, 21 January 2020 (UTC)

Joaquín Alejandro Suárez Urbani (born 4 July 2002) is a Venezuelan footballer who plays as a defender for Academia Puerto Cabello.

== Career statistics ==
=== Club ===
As of 21 January 2020.

Club	Season	League			Cup		Continental		Other		Total	
Club	Season	Division	Apps	Goals	Apps	Goals	Apps	Goals	Apps	Goals	Apps	Goals
Academia Puerto Cabello	2019	Venezuelan Primera División	1	0	0	0	0	0	0	0	1	0
Career total			1	0	0	0	0	0	0	0	1	0
