= Miłosz Trojak =

Polish footballer

Personal information
- Date of birth: 5 May 1994 (age 32)
- Place of birth: Wałbrzych, Poland
- Height: 1.91 m (6 ft 3 in)
- Positions: Centre-back; defensive midfielder

Team information
- Current team: Ulsan HD
- Number: 66

Youth career
- –2010: Górnik Wałbrzych
- 2010–2013: Ruch Chorzów

Senior career*
Years	Team	Apps	(Gls)
2013–2018	Ruch Chorzów	39	(0)
2018–2019	Stomil Olsztyn	19	(1)
2019–2022	Odra Opole	98	(3)
2022–2025	Korona Kielce	94	(4)
2025–	Ulsan HD	24	(1)
- * Club domestic league appearances and goals as of 3 August 2026

Miłosz Trojak (born 5 May 1994) is a Polish professional footballer who plays as a centre-back for K League 1 club Ulsan HD.

== Career ==
Trojak started his career with Polish side Ruch Chorzów.

On 16 January 2019, after a short stint at Stomil Olsztyn, he joined I liga side Odra Opole.

In mid-2022, he signed for Ekstraklasa side Korona Kielce, and was appointed captain of the team ahead of the 2023–24 season.

On 5 June 2025, Trojak moved to K League 1 club Ulsan HD. He made his debut on 18 June in a 0–1 loss to Mamelodi Sundowns at the 2025 FIFA Club World Cup.

== Style of play ==
With an exception for a short period at the start of the 2016–17 season, Trojak has spent most of his career playing as a defensive midfielder. Since his move to Korona, he has moved into a central defender role. Early in his career, he was compared to Bastian Schweinsteiger.

== Personal life ==
His father Józef was also a professional footballer. In the 1980s, he played as a defender for Górnik Wałbrzych and Śląsk Wrocław.
