= List of foreign K League 2 players =

- Players in **bold** are currently playing in K League 2.
- Nationality is listed under the official K League player registration; players may acquire multiple citizenship.
- If players have been capped for a national team, this nationality takes precedence over the nationality stated in the official K League player registration database.
- In dual citizen annotation, if dual citizen players have an international career, the country listed in italics is the national team they have played for.

== Africa (CAF) ==
=== Cameroon ===
- Nyom Nyom Aloys (2015 Goyang Hi FC)

=== Cote d'Ivoire ===
- Aubin Kouakou (2016 Chungju Hummel, 2017 FC Anyang)

=== Gambia ===
- Modou Barrow (2025 Incheon United); also played in K League 1 ※ **Dual citizen** of Gambia and Sweden

=== Ghana ===
- **Naeem Mohammed** (2026–present Chungnam Asan)

=== Guinea-Bissau ===
- **Ivanildo** (2026–present Cheonan City)

=== Liberia ===
- Seku Conneh (2018 Ansan Greeners)

=== Mali ===
- **Aboubacar Ibrahima Toungara** (2024 Suwon Samsung Bluewings, 2024–present Cheonan City)

=== Niger ===
- Olivier Bonnes (2018 Gwangju FC, 2018 Seongnam FC); also played in K League 1 ※ **Dual citizen** of Niger and France (Note: Olivier Bonnes's listed country in the K League player registration is France.)

=== Nigeria ===
- Chisom Egbuchulam (2019 Suwon FC)
- Samuel Nnamani (2021 Jeonnam Dragons, 2022 Bucheon FC 1995)
- **Chigozie Mbah** (2026–present Gyeongnam FC)

=== South Africa ===
- Lars Veldwijk (2020 Suwon FC); also played in K League 1 ※ **Dual citizen** of South Africa and the Netherlands (Note: Lars Veldwijk's listed country in the K League player registration is the Netherlands.)

=== South Sudan ===
- **Machop Chol** (2026–present Ansan Greeners) ※ **Dual citizen** of South Sudan and the United States

=== Togo ===
- Vincent Bossou (2015 Goyang Hi FC)
- Euloge Placca Fessou (2024 Jeonnam Dragons)
- **Peniel Mlapa** (2024–present Busan IPark); also played in K League 1

=== Tunisia ===
- Imed Louati (2015 Gyeongnam FC)

== Asia (AFC) ==
=== Australia ===
- Aleksandar Jovanovic (2013 Suwon FC); also played in K League 1
- Adrian Leijer (2017–2018 Suwon FC); also played in K League 1
- Bruce Djite (2017 Suwon FC); also played in K League 1
- Dario Vidošić (2017 Seongnam FC)
- Nick Ansell (2019 Jeonnam Dragons, 2020 Gyeongnam FC)
- Aleksandar Šušnjar (2019 Busan IPark)
- Dylan Fox (2019 FC Anyang)
- **Connor Chapman** (2020 Daejeon Hana Citizen, 2024–present Gimpo FC); also played in K League 1
- Ryan Edwards (2021–2022 Busan IPark) ※ **Dual citizen** of Australia and Scotland
- Aaron Calver (2022 Gwangju FC, 2025 Seoul E-Land); also played in K League 1
- Patrick Flottmann (2023 Seongnam FC)
- Peter Makrillos (2023 Chungbuk Cheongju, 2024 Seoul E-Land, 2024 Suwon Samsung Bluewings)
- Lachlan Wales (2024 Gyeongnam FC)
- John Iredale (2025–2026 Seoul E-Land); also played in K League 1
- Harrison Delbridge (2025 Incheon United); also played in K League 1
- **Charles Lokolingoy** (2025–present Chungnam Asan)

=== China ===
- Nan Song (2016–2018 Bucheon FC 1995)

=== East Timor ===
- Diogo Santos Rangel (2014 Daejeon Citizen, 2014 Gangwon FC) ※ **Dual citizen** of East Timor and Brazil
- Pedro Henrique Oliveira (2017 Daejeon Citizen) ※ **Dual citizen** of East Timor and Brazil

=== Indonesia ===
- Asnawi Mangkualam (2021–2022 Ansan Greeners, 2023 Jeonnam Dragons)

=== Iraq ===
- **Amar Muhsin** (2026–present Gimpo FC) ※ **Dual citizen** of Iraq and Sweden

=== Japan ===
- Robert Cullen (2015 Seoul E-Land)
- Daigo Watanabe (2016 Busan IPark)
- Michihiro Yasuda (2017 Busan IPark)
- Atsuki Wada (2017 Seoul E-Land)
- Tomoki Wada (2017 Seoul E-Land); also played in K League 1
- Minori Sato (2018 Gwangju FC)
- Chikashi Masuda (2019 Seoul E-Land); also played in K League 1
- Masatoshi Ishida (2019 Ansan Greeners, 2020 Suwon FC, 2021–2022 Daejeon Hana Citizen); also played in K League 1
- Go Iwase (2021–2022 Ansan Greeners)
- Ryohei Michibuchi (2021 Chungnam Asan)
- Yuki Kobayashi (2021 Seoul E-Land); also played in K League 1
- Mitsuru Maruoka (2022 Gimpo FC)
- Tsubasa Nishi (2022–2023 Seoul E-Land); also played in K League 1
- Ryonosuke Ohori (2022 Gyeongnam FC)
- Yuhei Sato (2022–2024 Jeonnam Dragons, 2024 Busan IPark)
- Kazuki Takahashi (2023–2025 Bucheon FC 1995); also played in K League 1
- Kazuki Kozuka (2024 Suwon Samsung Bluewings, 2024 Seoul E-Land); also played in K League 1
- Teppei Yachida (2024 FC Anyang)
- Hidetoshi Miyuki (2024 Chungbuk Cheongju)
- Misaki Sato (2025 Chungnam Asan, 2025 Cheonan City)
- Shota Saijo (2025 Incheon United)
- **Koki Tsukagawa** (2026–present Suwon FC)

=== Korea DPR ===
- An Byong-jun (2019–2020 Suwon FC, 2021–2022 & 2024 Busan IPark); also played in K League 1
- Ri Yong-jik (2024 FC Anyang, 2025 Busan IPark); also played in K League 1

=== Lebanon ===
- Soony Saad (2020 Ansan Greeners)

=== Malaysia ===
- Kogileswaran Raj (2023 Chungbuk Cheongju)

=== Palestine ===
- Éder (2015–2016 Daegu FC); also played in K League 1 ※ **Dual citizen** of Palestine and Brazil (Note: Registered with Palestinian nationality until 2017, and with Brazilian nationality since 2018.)

=== Philippines ===
- Álvaro Silva (2016 Daejeon Citizen); also played in K League 1 ※ **Dual citizen** of Philippines and Spain

=== Syria ===
- Serginho (2015 Daegu FC, 2016 Gangwon FC) ※ **Dual citizen** of Syria and Brazil
- Jonatas Belusso (2015 Gangwon FC, 2016 Seoul E-Land) ※ **Dual citizen** of Syria and Brazil

=== Uzbekistan ===
- Bahodir Nasimov (2017 Ansan Greeners)
- Bahodir Pardaev (2017 Bucheon FC 1995)
- Shohrux Gadoyev (2018–2019 Daejeon Citizen)
- Sanzhar Tursunov (2018–2019 Daejeon Citizen)
- Jovlon Ibrokhimov (2019 Suwon FC)
- Rustam Ashurmatov (2019 Gwangju FC); also played in K League 1
- Khursid Giyosov (2020 FC Anyang)
- Oleg Zoteev (2020–2021 Jeonnam Dragons)
- Ikromjon Alibaev (2021 Daejeon Hana Citizen, 2024 Seongnam FC); also played in K League 1
- Mukhammadali Alikulov (2024 Busan IPark, 2024 Jeonnam Dragons])
- **Otabek Ahadov** (2026–present Busan IPark)

=== Vietnam ===
- Nguyễn Văn Toàn (2023 Seoul E-Land)
- Nguyễn Cảnh Anh (2023 Cheonan City)
- Vũ Minh Hiếu (2023 Cheonan City)

== Europe (UEFA) ==
=== Austria ===
- Felipe Dorta (2019 Ansan Greeners)
- Armin Mujakic (2020 Chungnam Asan)

=== Bosnia and Herzegovina ===
- Haris Harba (2017 Bucheon FC 1995)
- **Luka Juričić** (2022–present Gimpo FC)
- Semir Smajlagić (2025 Chungnam Asan)
- **Aleksandar Vojnović** (2025–present Hwaseong FC)

=== Croatia ===
- Ivan Herceg (2016–2017 Gyeongnam FC, 2018 Seoul E-Land); also played in K League 1
- Marin Oršulić (2017–2018 Seongnam FC)
- Domagoj Drožđek (2021–2022 Busan IPark)
- Damir Šovšić (2023 Cheonan City); also played in K League 1 ※ **Dual citizen** of Croatia and Bosnia and Herzegovina
- Leo Mikić (2023 Jeonnam Dragons)
- **Maks Čelić** (2026–present Chungnam Asan)

=== Cyprus ===
- Valentinos Sielis (2020 Jeju United, 2021–2022 Busan IPark); also played in K League 1

=== England ===
- Nathan Oduwa (2024 Chungbuk Cheongju)
- Finley Welch (2026 Chungbuk Cheongju)
- **Luke Amos** (2026–present Paju Frontier) ※ **Dual citizen** of England and Nigeria

=== Estonia ===
- Henri Anier (2019 Suwon FC)

=== France ===
- Axel Bakayoko (2023 Cheonan City)
- **Christy Manzinga** (2023–present Seongnam FC) ※ **Dual citizen** of France and DR Congo
- **Keelan Lebon** (2025–2026 Jeonnam Dragons, 2026–present Suwon Samsung Bluewings)
- Jérémy Corinus (2026 Jeonnam Dragons)

=== Georgia ===
- Levan Shengelia (2017 Daejeon Citizen)
- **Nika Kacharava** (2022–present Jeonnam Dragons)
- **Irakli Bugridze** (2026 Chungbuk Cheongju, 2026–present Jeonnam Dragons)

=== Germany ===
- Richard Sukuta-Pasu (2020 Seoul E-Land) ※ **Dual citizen** of Germany and DR Congo
- **Stanislav Iljutcenko** (2025–2026 Suwon Samsung Bluewings, 2026–present Hwaseong FC); also played in K League 1 ※ **Dual citizen** of Germany and Russia

=== Hungary ===
- Soma Novothny (2019 Busan IPark)

=== Italy ===
- Boadu Maxwell Acosty (2020–2022 FC Anyang); also played in K League 1 ※ **Dual citizen** of Italy and Ghana

=== Kosovo ===
- **Leonard Pllana** (2022–2023 Jeonnam Dragons, 2024–2025 Gimpo FC, 2026–present Hwaseong FC) ※ **Dual citizen** of Kosovo and Sweden

=== Lithuania ===
- **Edgaras Dubickas** (2026–present Suwon Samsung Bluewings)

=== Montenegro ===
- Bogdan Milić (2013 Suwon FC); also played in K League 1
- Vladan Adžić (2014–2015 & 2017 Suwon FC); also played in K League 1
- Luka Rotković (2017 Ansan Greeners)
- Stefan Mugoša (2025 Incheon United); also played in K League 1
- **Aleksa Karadzić** (2026–present Gyeongnam FC)

=== Netherlands ===
- Arsenio Valpoort (2018 Busan IPark)
- Sherjill MacDonald (2018 Busan IPark)
- Luc Castaignos (2020 Gyeongnam FC); also played in K League 1
- Jop van der Avert (2025 Chungbuk Cheongju)

=== Norway ===
- Julian Kristoffersen (2020 Jeonnam Dragons)
- Martin Hoel Andersen (2026 Suwon FC)

=== Portugal ===
- Renato Santos (2021 Busan IPark)
- Jucie Lupeta (2023–2024 Bucheon FC 1995)
- Leonardo Acevedo (2024–2025 Seongnam FC); also played in K League 1 ※ **Dual citizen** of Portugal and Colombia
- Gerso Fernandes (2025 Incheon United); also played in K League 1 ※ **Dual citizen** of Portugal and Guinea-Bissau
- **Bandeira** (2026–present Chungbuk Cheongju)
- **Francisco Geraldes** (2026 Seoul E-Land, 2026–present Chungbuk Cheongju)
- **Rúben Macedo** (2025–present Gyeongnam FC)

=== Romania ===
- Ciprian Vasilache (2014 Gangwon FC, 2014 Chungju Hummel)
- Cristian Dănălache (2016 Gyeongnam FC, 2017 Daejeon Citizen)
- Jean-Claude Bozga (2016 Daejeon Citizen) ※ **Dual citizen** of Romania and DR Congo
- Aurelian Chițu (2018–2019 Daejeon Citizen)
- Sebastian Mailat (2024 Suwon Samsung Bluewings)

=== Serbia ===
- Miloš Stojanović (2015 Gyeongnam FC, 2016 Busan IPark); also played in K League 1
- Ivan Marković (2016 Gyeongnam FC)
- Uroš Đerić (2020 Gyeongnam FC); also played in K League 1
- Lazar Arsić (2020 Seoul E-Land)
- Fejsal Mulić (2024 Suwon Samsung Bluewings); also played in K League 1
- Pavle Ivelja (2025 Cheonan City)
- **Milan Obradović** (2026–present Ansan Greeners)
- **Sava Petrov** (2026–present Hwaseong FC)

=== Slovakia ===
- Filip Hlohovský (2017 Seongnam FC, 2018 Daejeon Citizen)
- Ákos Szarka (2020 Suwon FC)

=== Spain ===
- Sisi (2015 Suwon FC)
- Jaime Gavilán (2017 Suwon FC); also played in K League 1
- Ismael Jorge Balea (2020 Ansan Greeners) ※ **Dual citizen** of Spain and Uruguay
- **Osmar** (2024–present Seoul E-Land); also played in K League 1
- **Borja Bastón** (2026–present Paju Frontier)

=== Sweden ===
- Philip Hellquist (2020 Chungnam Asan)
- Robin Simović (2023 Jeonnam Dragons)
- Adam Bergmark Wiberg (2025 Chungnam Asan)
- **Tim Hartzell** (2026–present Ansan Greeners)

=== Wales ===
- **Marcus Dackers** (2026–present Daegu FC)

== North America, Central America, and Caribbean (CONCACAF) ==
=== Costa Rica ===
- Elias Aguilar (2020 Jeju United); also played in K League 1
- Jonathan Moya (2021–2023 FC Anyang)

=== Curaçao ===
- **Jafar Arias** (2026–present Paju Frontier) ※ **Dual citizen** of Curaçao and the Netherlands

=== Jamaica ===
- Ryan Johnson (2015 Seoul E-Land)

=== Mexico ===
- Édgar Pacheco (2016 Gangwon FC)

=== Panama ===
- Jorman Aguilar (2022 Bucheon FC 1995)

=== Trinidad and Tobago ===
- Carlyle Mitchell (2015–2016 Seoul E-Land)

=== United States ===
- Austin Berry (2015 FC Anyang)
- Seth Moses (2015 FC Anyang)
- Eduvie Ikoba (2024 Seoul E-Land)

== South America (CONMEBOL) ==
=== Argentina ===
- Jonathan Castillo (2016 Chungju Hummel)
- Nicolas Orsini (2016 FC Anyang)
- Diego Bielkiewicz (2018 Seoul E-Land)
- Santiago De Sagastizabal (2021 Ansan Greeners)
- Mauricio Asenjo (2022 Seoul E-Land)
- Felipe Cadenazzi (2022 Seoul E-Land)

=== Bolivia ===
- Enzo Monteiro (2026 Chungbuk Cheongju)

=== Brazil ===
- Cássio Vargas (2013 Gwangju FC)
- Lúcio (2013 Gwangju FC); also played in K League 1
- Tutinha (2013 Chungju Hummel)
- Miguel Bianconi (2013 Chungju Hummel)
- Alex (2013–2014 Goyang Hi FC, 2014 Gangwon FC, 2016 Daegu FC, 2017 FC Anyang, 2017 Seoul E-Land, 2018 FC Anyang, 2019 Seoul E-Land)
- Almir (2013 Goyang Hi FC, 2014 Gangwon FC, 2015 Bucheon FC 1995); also played in K League 1
- Luizinho (2013 Gwangju FC)
- Alessandro Lopes (2013 Chungju Hummel); also played in K League 1
- Joelson Franca Dias (2014 Gangwon FC)
- Rodrigo (2014–2015, 2017 Bucheon FC 1995)
- Romarinho (2014 Gwangju FC)
- Fabio Neves (2014 Gwangju FC); also played in K League 1
- Roniere (2014 Goyang Hi FC)
- Wagner (2014 FC Anyang); also played in K League 1
- Felipe Adão (2014 FC Anyang)
- Adriano (2014 Daejeon Citizen); also played in K League 1
- Malcon (2016 Chungju Hummel)
- Matheus (2014 Daegu FC); also played in K League 1
- Vanderlei (2014 Daejeon Citizen)
- Johnathan (2014–2015 Daegu FC); also played in K League 1
- Neverton (2014 Daegu FC)
- Maranhão (2014 Daejeon Citizen)
- Diego (2014 Gwangju FC)
- Maycon (2014 Goyang Hi FC)
- Japa (2014–2015 Suwon FC)
- Kalel (2014 Chungju Hummel)
- Raphael (2014 Chungju Hummel)
- Léo Jaime (2015 Daegu FC)
- Henan (2015 Gangwon FC); also played in K League 1
- Gil (2015–2016 Gangwon FC)
- Tarabai (2015–2016 Seoul E-Land)
- Marcinho (2015–2016 Chungju Hummel)
- Fauver (2015 Gyeongnam FC)
- Lukian (2015–2016 Bucheon FC 1995, 2017 Busan IPark, 2017 FC Anyang)
- Waguininho (2016–2017 Bucheon FC 1995); also played in K League 1
- Paulo Sérgio Luiz de Souza (2016 Daegu FC, 2017 Seongnam FC)
- César Fernando Silva Melo (2016 Daegu FC); also played in K League 1
- Wanderson Carvalho (2016 Daejeon Citizen); also played in K League 1
- Willian Popp (2016 Busan IPark, 2018 Bucheon FC 1995)
- **Cesinha** (2016 & 2026–present Daegu FC); also played in K League 1
- Matheus Alves (2016 Gangwon FC, 2018 Suwon FC, 2021 Chungnam Asan)
- Rafael Ratão (2016 Chungju Hummel)
- Nilson (2016 Busan IPark, 2017–2019 Bucheon FC 1995, 2020–2021 FC Anyang, 2022–2024 Bucheon FC 1995); also played in K League 1
- William Henrique (2017 Ansan Greeners)
- Josiel Alves de Oliveira (2017 FC Anyang)
- Danilo Neco (2017 Seongnam FC); also played in K League 1
- Danny Morais (2017 Busan IPark)
- Rômulo (2017–2019 Busan IPark); also played in K League 1
- Alex Bruno (2017 Gyeongnam FC, 2018 Suwon FC)
- Daniel Lovinho (2017 Seoul E-Land)
- Yago Moreira Silva (2017 Seoul E-Land)
- Marcão (2017 Gyeongnam FC); also played in K League 1
- Bruno Cantanhede (2017 Daejeon Citizen, 2018 FC Anyang)
- Dário Jr. (2017 Seongnam FC)
- Pedro Carmona (2017 Suwon FC)
- Léo Mineiro (2017 Busan IPark); also played in K League 1
- Éder (2018 Seongnam FC, 2020 Jeju United); also played in K League 1 ※ **Dual citizen** of Brazil and Palestine
- Alex (2018 Suwon FC, 2019 FC Anyang)
- Felipe (2018–2019 Gwangju FC); also played in K League 1
- Marcos Antônio (2018 FC Anyang)
- **Jonathan Balotelli** (2018 Busan IPark, 2021–present Jeonnam Dragons)
- Róbson (2018 Gwangju FC, 2019 Seoul E-Land, 2021–2022 Ansan Greeners, 2023 Chungnam Asan)
- Douglas Coutinho (2019 Seoul E-Land)
- Wanderson (2019 Jeonnam Dragons); also played in K League 1
- Matheus Pato (2019 Daejeon Citizen)
- **Willyan** (2019 Gwangju FC, 2021–2022 Gyeongnam FC, 2022 Daejeon Hana Citizen, 2026–present Suwon FC, 2026–present Cheonan City); also played in K League 1
- Diego Maurício (2019 Busan IPark); also played in K League 1
- Gustavo Vintecinco (2019 Ansan Greeners); also played in K League 1
- Bruno Nunes (2019 Jeonnam Dragons)
- Ramazotti (2019 Daejeon Citizen)
- Bruno Baio (2019 Jeonnam Dragons, 2020–2021 Daejeon Hana Citizen)
- André Luis (2020 Daejeon Hana Citizen); also played in K League 1
- Bruno (2020 Ansan Greeners, 2020 Chungnam Asan)
- Jefferson Baiano (2020 Bucheon FC 1995)
- Maurides (2020 FC Anyang)
- William Barbio (2020 Bucheon FC 1995, 2021 Seoul E-Land)
- Anderson Canhoto (2020–2022 Ansan Greeners)
- Danilo Alves (2020 Suwon FC)
- Edinho (2020–2021 Daejeon Hana Citizen)
- Felipe Augusto (2020 Ansan Greeners)
- Hernandes Rodrigues (2020 Jeonnam Dragons, 2021–2022 Gyeongnam FC); also played in K League 1
- Leandro Ribeiro (2020–2021 Seoul E-Land, 2022 Daejeon Hana Citizen, 2025 Jeonnam Dragons, 2025 Seongnam FC); also played in K League 1
- Marlone (2020–present Suwon FC); also played in K League 1
- Negueba (2020 Gyeongnam FC); also played in K League 1
- Rodolfo (2020 Jeonnam Dragons)
- Alex Sandro (2021 Chungnam Asan)
- Tiago Orobó (2022 Gyeongnam FC); also played in K League 1
- **Reis** (2022 Gwangju FC, 2026–present Suwon Samsung Bluewings); also played in K League 1
- Mike (2022 Gwangju FC)
- Sandro Lima (2022 Gwangju FC); also played in K League 1
- Guilherme Castro (2022–2023 Gyeongnam FC)
- Heliardo (2022 Gyeongnam FC)
- Andrigo (2022–2023 FC Anyang); also played in K League 1
- **Bruno Lamas** (2022–2024 Busan IPark, 2026–present Cheonan City); also played in K League 1
- Thiago Henrique (2022–2023 Ansan Greeners)
- Renato Kayzer (2022 Daejeon Hana Citizen)
- Renan (2023 Seoul E-Land)
- **Ronan** (2023 Seoul E-Land, 2025–present Jeonnam Dragons)
- **Fessin** (2023–2025 Busan IPark, 2026–present Suwon Samsung Bluewings)
- Bruno Oliveira (2023 Seoul E-Land)
- Gabriel Ramos (2023 Bucheon FC 1995)
- Leonardo Kalil (2023 Bucheon FC 1995)
- **Valdívia** (2023–present Jeonnam Dragons)
- **Gabriel Honório** (2023 Ansan Greeners, 2023–2024 Seongnam FC, 2026–present Busan IPark)
- Wandrew (2023 Ansan Greeners)
- **Gleyson** (2023–present Gyeongnam FC)
- Juninho Rocha (2023 Gimpo FC, 2024 Chungnam Asan); also played in K League 1
- Jorge Luiz (2023 Chungbuk Cheongju); also played in K League 1
- Paulinho (2023–2024 Chungbuk Cheongju)
- Rodolfo (2023 Cheonan City)
- Bruno Mota (2023–2024 Cheonan City); also played in K League 1
- Yago (2023–2024 FC Anyang); also played in K League 1
- Denilson (2023 Seongnam FC)
- Franklin Mascote (2023 Busan IPark)
- **Mirandinha** (2023 Gyeongnam FC, 2026–present Jeonnam Dragons)
- Bruno Paraíba (2023 FC Anyang, 2024–2025 Gimpo FC, 2025 Cheonan City)
- Laércio (2023 FC Anyang)
- Raphael Utzig (2023 Chungnam Asan)
- Léo Ceará (2023 Gyeongnam FC)
- **Paulo Henrique** (2023–2024 Cheonan City, 2025–2026 Suwon Samsung Bluewings, 2026–present Gimpo FC)
- **Bruno Silva** (2024 Seoul E-Land, 2025–present Suwon Samsung Bluewings)
- Ricardo Lopes (2024 Busan IPark); also played in K League 1
- Matheus Oliveira (2024 FC Anyang); also played in K League 1
- Rodrigo Bassani (2024–2025 Bucheon FC 1995); also played in K League 1
- **Danrlei** (2024 FC Anyang, 2025–2026 Gyeongnam FC, 2026–present Daegu FC)
- Tales (2024 Chungbuk Cheongju); also played in K League 1
- Erikys (2024 Cheonan City)
- **Venício** (2024 Chungbuk Cheongju, 2025–present Seongnam FC)
- Anderson (2024 Chungnam Asan)
- Kainã (2024 Chungnam Asan)
- **Denisson Silva** (2024–present Chungnam Asan)
- Nicolas Careca (2024 FC Anyang)
- Felipe Saraiva (2024 Gyeongnam FC, 2025 Ansan Greeners)
- **Euller** (2025–present Seoul E-Land)
- Ítalo (2025 Seoul E-Land); also played in K League 1
- Pedrinho (2025 Seoul E-Land); also played in K League 1
- Dimitri (2025 Hwaseong FC)
- Arthur (2025 Hwaseong FC)
- Luan Costa (2025 Hwaseong FC)
- Dominic Vinicius (2025 Hwaseong FC) ※ **Dual citizen** of Brazil and Nigeria
- Bruno Lapa (2025 Ansan Greeners) ※ **Dual citizen** of Brazil and United States
- Luan Santos (2025 Ansan Greeners)
- Thiaguinho Santos (2025 Bucheon FC 1995); also played in K League 1
- Jefferson Galego (2025 Bucheon FC 1995); also played in K League 1
- Léo Andrade (2025 Suwon Samsung Bluewings)
- **Matheus Serafim** (2025 Suwon Samsung Bluewings, 2026–present Daegu FC)
- **Renan Areias** (2025–present Gyeongnam FC)
- **Xavier** (2025–present Busan IPark)
- Gonzalo (2025 Busan IPark)
- **Djalma** (2025–present Gimpo FC)
- **Alan Cariús** (2025–present Seoul E-Land)
- Eduardo (2025 Ansan Greeners)
- Jefferson (2025 Ansan Greeners)
- **Gabriel Santos** (2025 Chungbuk Cheongju, 2025–present Seoul E-Land)
- Pedro Vitor (2025 Chungbuk Cheongju)
- Felipe Valdívia (2025 Cheonan City)
- **Demethryus** (2025–present Hwaseong FC)
- **Marlon** (2026–present Ansan Greeners)
- **Gabriel Lima** (2026–present Ansan Greeners)
- Wiliam Marcílio (2026 Chungnam Asan)
- Geovani (2026 Daegu FC); also played in K League 1
- **Edgar** (2026–present Daegu FC); also played in K League 1
- Carlos Jatobá (2026 Daegu FC); also played in K League 1
- **Matheus Frizzo** (2026–present Suwon FC)
- **Luan Dias** (2026–present Gimpo FC); also played in K League 1
- **Derlan** (2026–present Suwon FC)
- **Cristian Renato** (2026–present Busan IPark)
- **Matheus Babi** (2026–present Suwon FC)
- **Gustavo Sarjani** (2026–present Cheonan City)
- **Antonio Gutemberg** (2026–present Busan IPark)
- Dudu Nardini (2026 Chungnam Asan)
- **Marcus Uberaba** (2026–present Gyeongnam FC)
- **Vitinho** (2026–present Chungnam Asan)
- **Caio Marcelo** (2026–present Seoul E-Land); also played in K League 1
- **Walterson** (2026–present Paju Frontier); also played in K League 1

=== Chile ===
- Ignacio Herrera (2018 Seoul E-Land)
- **Josepablo Monreal** (2024–present Chungnam Asan); also played in K League 1

=== Colombia ===
- Manuel Palacios (2019 FC Anyang); also played in K League 1
- Wilinton Aponzá (2023 Chungnam Asan)
- **Luis Mina** (2023–2026 Gimpo FC, 2026–present Suwon Samsung Bluewings)
- Jhon Montaño (2024 Jeonnam Dragons, 2024 Seoul E-Land, 2025 Bucheon FC 1995); also played in K League 1
- **Paul Villero** (2025 Busan IPark, 2026–present Seongnam FC)
- **Ménder García** (2026–present Chungbuk Cheongju)
- **Julián Bonilla** (2026–present Paju Frontier)

=== Ecuador ===
- Marlon de Jesús (2019 Bucheon FC 1995)

=== Paraguay ===
- **Julio Báez** (2026–present Paju Frontier)

=== Uruguay ===
- Raúl Tarragona (2017–2018 Ansan Greeners)
- Pablo González (2023 Gimpo FC)
- José Alberti (2025 Jeonnam Dragons)
- Kevin Méndez (2025 Chungnam Asan)

=== Venezuela ===
- Daniel Febles (2018 Seoul E-Land)
