= 2024 K League 2 =

South Korean professional league season

Hana Bank K League 2
- Season: 2024
- Dates: 1 March – 9 November 2024
- Champions: FC Anyang (1st title)
- Promoted: FC Anyang
- Matches: 234
- Goals: 616 (2.63 per match)
- Best player: Matheus Oliveira
- Top goalscorer: Bruno Mota (16 goals)
- Highest attendance: 15,308; Suwon 3–0 Ansan (3 November)
- Lowest attendance: 384; Ansan 0–3 Seoul E (11 May)
- Average attendance: 3,801

The 2024 K League 2, also known as the Hana Bank K League 2 for sponsorship reasons, was the 12th season of the K League 2, the second-highest division in South Korean football league system.

== Teams ==
=== Team changes ===
As the 2023 K League 2 champions, Gimcheon Sangmu were promoted to the K League 1. Suwon Samsung Bluewings were relegated from the K League 1 for the first time in the club's history.

▲ Promoted to K League 1	▼ Relegated from K League 1
Gimcheon Sangmu	Suwon Samsung Bluewings

=== Locations ===
Locations of the 2024 K League 2 teams
Locations of the 2024 K League 2 teams in the Seoul Capital Area

The following thirteen teams participated in the 2024 K League 2.

Team	City/Province	Abbreviation
Ansan Greeners	Ansan	Ansan
FC Anyang	Anyang	Anyang
Bucheon FC 1995	Bucheon	Bucheon
Busan IPark	Busan	Busan
Cheonan City	Cheonan	Cheonan
Chungbuk Cheongju	Cheongju	Chungbuk Cheongju
Chungnam Asan	Asan	Chungnam Asan
Gimpo FC	Gimpo	Gimpo
Gyeongnam FC	Gyeongnam	Gyeongnam
Jeonnam Dragons	Jeonnam	Jeonnam
Seongnam FC	Seongnam	Seongnam
Seoul E-Land	Seoul	Seoul E
Suwon Samsung Bluewings	Suwon	Suwon

=== Stadiums ===
Ansan Greeners	FC Anyang	Bucheon FC 1995
Ansan Wa~ Stadium	Anyang Stadium	Bucheon Stadium
Capacity: 35,000	Capacity: 17,143	Capacity: 34,456
Busan IPark		Cheonan City
Busan Asiad Main Stadium (Note: Used until June 2024.)	Busan Gudeok Stadium (Note: Used since July 2024.)	Cheonan Stadium
Capacity: 53,769	Capacity: 12,349	Capacity: 26,000
Chungbuk Cheongju	Chungnam Asan	Gimpo FC
Cheongju Stadium	Yi Sun-sin Stadium	Gimpo Solteo Football Stadium
Capacity: 16,280	Capacity: 19,283	Capacity: 5,000
Gyeongnam FC	Jeonnam Dragons	Seongnam FC
Changwon Football Center	Gwangyang Stadium	Tancheon Stadium
Capacity: 15,074	Capacity: 13,496	Capacity: 16,146
Seoul E-Land	Suwon Samsung Bluewings	
Mokdong Stadium	Suwon World Cup Stadium	Yongin Mireu Stadium
Capacity: 15,511	Capacity: 44,031	Capacity: 37,155

=== Personnel and sponsoring ===
Team	Manager	Main sponsor	Kit manufacturer
Ansan Greeners	(South Korea) Lee Kwan-woo	Government of Ansan	Applerind
FC Anyang	(South Korea) Ryu Byeong-hoon	Osang Healthcare	V-EXX
Bucheon FC 1995	(South Korea) Lee Young-min	Government of Bucheon	Kelme
Busan IPark	(South Korea) Jo Sung-hwan	HDC Hyundai Development Company	Puma
Cheonan City	(South Korea) Kim Tae-wan	Government of Cheonan	Puma
Chungbuk Cheongju	(South Korea) Choi Yun-kyum	none	Applerind
Chungnam Asan	(South Korea) Kim Hyun-seok	Haeyu Construction	Mizuno
Gimpo FC	(South Korea) Ko Jeong-woon	Government of Gimpo	Sunderland of Scotland
Gyeongnam FC	(South Korea) Lee Eul-yong	Nonghyup Bank	Hummel
Jeonnam Dragons	(South Korea) Lee Jang-kwan	POSCO	Puma
Seongnam FC	(South Korea) Jeon Kyung-jun	Government of Seongnam	Umbro
Seoul E-Land	(South Korea) Kim Do-kyun	NC Department Store	New Balance
Suwon Samsung Bluewings	(South Korea) Byun Sung-hwan	Samsung Galaxy S24	Puma

=== Managerial changes ===
Team	Outgoing manager	Manner of departure	Date of vacancy	Table	Replaced by	Date of appointment
Cheonan City	(South Korea) Park Nam-yeol	Sacked	29 November 2023	Pre-season	(South Korea) Kim Tae-wan	18 December 2023
FC Anyang	(South Korea) Lee Woo-hyung	Change of assignment	6 December 2023	Pre-season	(South Korea) Ryu Beong-hoon	7 December 2023
Gyeongnam FC	(South Korea) Seol Ki-hyeon	End of contract	30 November 2023	Pre-season	(South Korea) Park Dong-hyuk	5 December 2023
Chungnam Asan	(South Korea) Park Dong-hyuk	Signed by Gyeongnam FC	4 December 2023	Pre-season	(South Korea) Kim Hyun-seok	1 January 2024
Seoul E-Land	(South Korea) Park Choong-kyun	End of contract	13 December 2023	Pre-season	(South Korea) Kim Do-kyun	14 December 2023
Seongnam FC	(South Korea) Lee Ki-hyung	Sacked	20 March 2024	13th	(South Korea) Choi Chul-woo	21 May 2024
Busan IPark	(South Korea) Park Jin-sub	Resigned	8 July 2024	9th	(South Korea) Jo Sung-hwan	14 July 2024
Ansan Greeners	(South Korea) Lim Kwan-sik	Resigned	10 July 2024	13th	(South Korea) Lee Kwan-woo	11 August 2024
Seongnam FC	(South Korea) Choi Chul-woo	Mutual consent	6 August 2024	12th	(South Korea) Jeon Kyung-jun	11 September 2024
Gyeongnam FC	(South Korea) Park Dong-hyuk	Sacked	9 September 2024	13th	(South Korea) Lee Eul-yong	12 November 2024

=== Foreign players ===
North Korean player An Byong-jun, who played for Busan IPark, was deemed as a native player by South Korean nationality law.

Club	Player 1	Player 2	Player 3	AFC player	ASEAN player	Former players
Ansan Greeners						
FC Anyang	(Brazil) Matheus Oliveira	(Brazil) Nicolas Careca	(Brazil) Yago César	(Japan) Teppei Yachida		(Brazil) Danrlei
Bucheon FC 1995	(Brazil) Nilson	(Brazil) Rodrigo Bassani	(Portugal) Jucie Lupeta	(Japan) Kazuki Takahashi		
Busan IPark	(Brazil) Bruno Lamas	(Brazil) Fessin	(Togo) Peniel Mlapa	(Japan) Yuhei Sato		(Brazil) Ricardo Lopes (Uzbekistan) Mukhammadali Alikulov
Cheonan City	(Brazil) Bruno Mota	(Mali) Aboubacar Toungara				(Brazil) Erikys (Brazil) Paulo Henrique
Chungbuk Cheongju	(Brazil) Tales	(Brazil) Venício	(Ghana) Sadam Sulley			(Brazil) Paulinho (England) Nathan Oduwa (Japan) Hidetoshi Miyuki
Chungnam Asan	(Brazil) Denisson Silva	(Brazil) Juninho Rocha	(Chile) Josepablo Monreal			(Brazil) Anderson Cordeiro (Brazil) Kainã
Gimpo FC	(Brazil) Bruno Paraíba	(Colombia) Luis Mina	(Kosovo) Leonard Pllana	(Australia) Connor Chapman		
Gyeongnam FC	(Brazil) Felipe Fonseca	(Brazil) Felipe Saraiva	(Georgia (country)) Bachana Arabuli	(Australia) Lachlan Wales		(Brazil) Hélio Borges (Colombia) Rodrigo Rivas (Georgia (country)) Zurab Museliani (Japan) Yukiya Sugita
Jeonnam Dragons	(Brazil) Bruno Oliveira	(Brazil) Valdívia	(Togo) Euloge Placca	(Uzbekistan) Mukhammadali Alikulov		(Colombia) Jhon Montaño (Japan) Yuhei Sato
Seongnam FC	(Colombia) Leonardo Acevedo	(Democratic Republic of the Congo) Christy Manzinga	(Guinea-Bissau) Toni Gomes	(Uzbekistan) Ikromjon Alibaev		(Brazil) Gabriel Honório
Seoul E-Land	(Brazil) Bruno Silva	(Colombia) Jhon Montaño	(Spain) Osmar	(Japan) Kazuki Kozuka		(Australia) Peter Makrillos (United States) Eduvie Ikoba
Suwon Samsung Bluewings	(Brazil) Paulo Henrique	(Romania) Sebastian Mailat	(Serbia) Fejsal Mulić	(Australia) Peter Makrillos		(Ghana) Maxwell Acosty (Japan) Kazuki Kozuka (Mali) Aboubacar Toungara

== League table ==
Pos	Team	Pld	W	D	L	GF	GA	GD	Pts	Promotion or qualification
1	FC Anyang (C, P)	36	18	9	9	51	36	+15	63	Promotion to K League 1
2	Chungnam Asan	36	17	9	10	60	44	+16	60	Qualification for promotion play-offs final round
3	Seoul E-Land	36	17	7	12	62	45	+17	58	Qualification for promotion play-offs second round
4	Jeonnam Dragons	36	16	9	11	61	50	+11	57	Qualification for promotion play-offs first round
5	Busan IPark	36	16	8	12	55	45	+10	56	Qualification for promotion play-offs first round
6	Suwon Samsung Bluewings	36	15	11	10	46	35	+11	56	
7	Gimpo FC	36	14	12	10	43	41	+2	54	
8	Bucheon FC 1995	36	12	13	11	44	45	−1	49	
9	Cheonan City	36	11	10	15	48	57	−9	43	
10	Chungbuk Cheongju	36	8	16	12	32	42	−10	40	
11	Ansan Greeners	36	9	10	17	35	48	−13	37	
12	Gyeongnam FC	36	6	15	15	45	62	−17	33	
13	Seongnam FC	36	5	11	20	34	66	−32	26	

Source: K League Soccerway
Rules for classification: 1) Points; 2) Goals scored; 3) Goal difference; 4) Wins; 5) Head-to-head points
(C) Champions; (P) Promoted

== Positions by matchday ==
Leaders, promotion to K League 1
Qualification for promotion play-offs final round
Qualification for promotion play-offs second round
Qualification for promotion play-offs first round

Team ╲ Round	1	2	3	4	5	6	7	8	9	10	11	12	13	14	15	16	17	18	19	20	21	22	23	24	25	26	27	28	29	30	31	32	33	34	35	36	37	38	39
FC Anyang	3	4	6	2	1	1	1	2	2	1	1	1	1	1	1	1	1	1	1	1	1	1	1	1	1	1	1	1	1	1	1	1	1	1	1	1	1	1	1
Chungnam Asan	7	10	5	1	4	5	5	6	8	8	5	8	9	7	9	7	7	5	4	3	3	4	3	3	3	4	5	5	4	4	3	3	2	2	2	2	2	3	2
Seoul E-Land	1	1	2	5	4	6	7	7	5	5	3	3	5	4	3	3	3	4	5	6	5	3	4	4	4	3	4	3	3	2	2	2	4	4	3	3	3	2	3
Jeonnam Dragons	11	3	8	6	2	4	3	5	6	9	6	4	2	2	2	2	2	2	2	2	2	2	2	2	2	2	2	2	2	3	5	7	5	5	4	4	5	5	4
Busan IPark	13	7	10	7	8	3	4	3	3	3	4	5	3	5	7	5	5	8	9	9	9	9	7	6	6	7	6	6	6	5	6	4	3	3	5	5	6	6	5
Suwon Samsung Bluewings	4	7	3	8	3	2	2	1	1	2	2	2	4	6	8	6	6	6	6	5	6	6	5	5	5	5	3	4	5	6	4	6	7	6	6	6	4	4	6
Gimpo FC	10	13	12	13	12	12	13	10	7	10	11	6	6	3	4	4	4	3	3	4	4	5	6	7	9	8	7	8	7	8	8	8	8	8	7	7	7	7	7
Bucheon FC 1995	9	11	7	3	6	8	8	9	10	7	10	10	7	8	5	8	8	9	8	8	7	7	8	8	7	9	8	7	8	7	7	5	6	7	8	8	8	8	8
Cheonan City	2	5	4	9	9	11	11	13	13	13	12	12	12	11	10	10	11	10	10	10	10	10	10	10	10	10	10	10	10	10	9	9	9	9	9	9	9	9	9
Chungbuk Cheongju	6	2	1	4	7	7	6	4	4	4	7	7	8	9	6	9	9	7	7	7	8	8	9	9	8	6	9	9	9	9	10	10	10	10	10	10	10	10	10
Ansan Greeners	7	4	9	11	13	10	10	12	11	12	13	13	13	13	13	13	13	13	13	13	13	13	13	13	13	12	12	13	11	11	11	11	11	11	11	11	11	11	11
Gyeongnam FC	4	8	11	12	11	13	12	8	9	6	9	11	11	10	11	12	12	12	12	12	11	11	11	11	11	11	11	12	12	12	12	12	12	12	12	12	12	12	12
Seongnam FC	12	12	13	10	10	9	9	11	12	11	8	9	10	12	12	11	10	11	11	11	12	12	12	12	12	13	13	11	13	13	13	13	13	13	13	13	13	13	13

Source: K League

== Results ==
=== Matches 1–24 ===
Teams played each other twice, once at home, once away.

Home \ Away	ASG	AYG	BCN	BSI	CNC	CBCJ	CNAS	GIM	GNM	JND	SNM	SUE	SSB
Ansan Greeners	—	3–2	2–1	1–0	1–2	0–0	1–0	1–2	1–2	1–2	0–1	0–3	0–1
FC Anyang	1–0	—	3–0	0–2	3–0	2–0	1–0	0–0	1–0	2–3	2–0	2–1	1–3
Bucheon FC 1995	0–0	1–2	—	1–3	1–3	0–4	3–0	1–0	2–0	3–4	1–1	1–0	0–3
Busan IPark	2–1	3–4	2–2	—	2–3	0–2	2–3	0–1	2–1	0–1	2–2	0–3	1–1
Cheonan City	1–1	0–1	1–2	2–4	—	1–2	0–1	1–2	2–2	1–0	0–0	0–4	1–2
Chungbuk Cheongju	2–1	1–1	0–0	0–0	1–1	—	0–3	0–0	1–0	1–0	1–1	2–3	0–1
Chungnam Asan	2–0	1–1	1–1	0–0	2–2	4–1	—	1–2	4–0	1–1	1–1	2–0	1–0
Gimpo FC	1–0	0–1	0–1	1–0	1–1	1–1	3–3	—	2–2	1–2	2–1	2–5	1–1
Gyeongnam FC	2–0	0–0	2–2	1–4	3–3	1–1	1–2	1–3	—	2–4	1–2	2–1	0–0
Jeonnam Dragons	1–1	1–2	1–1	2–3	1–0	1–1	3–2	4–0	1–3	—	2–0	2–2	1–1
Seongnam FC	1–3	3–1	0–1	0–1	0–2	1–2	0–4	2–1	1–4	1–2	—	2–2	2–1
Seoul E-Land	0–3	1–2	1–1	2–1	3–4	1–1	5–0	1–1	2–1	1–2	3–1	—	2–1
Suwon Samsung Bluewings	1–1	2–1	0–1	0–1	0–1	0–0	2–1	2–1	1–1	5–1	3–0	1–3	—

Source: Soccerway
Legend: Blue = home team win; Yellow = draw; Red = away team win.

=== Matches 25–36 ===
Teams played each other once, either at home or away.

Home \ Away	ASG	AYG	BCN	BSI	CNC	CBCJ	CNAS	GIM	GNM	JND	SNM	SUE	SSB
Ansan Greeners	—	—	1–0	0–5	—	3–2	—	—	1–1	—	1–1	0–0	—
FC Anyang	2–1	—	—	4–1	1–1	—	0–1	—	2–2	1–1	—	—	—
Bucheon FC 1995	—	0–0	—	—	—	0–0	—	2–0	—	—	3–0	2–0	1–1
Busan IPark	—	—	3–1	—	—	0–1	—	0–0	1–1	—	3–1	0–0	—
Cheonan City	2–3	—	1–1	2–3	—	1–0	—	—	3–1	—	—	0–3	—
Chungbuk Cheongju	—	0–2	—	—	—	—	1–4	0–1	—	—	1–1	1–2	2–2
Chungnam Asan	1–1	—	2–2	0–1	2–0	—	—	—	3–0	2–1	—	—	—
Gimpo FC	1–0	1–2	—	—	1–0	—	3–0	—	—	4–3	—	—	0–0
Gyeongnam FC	—	—	1–4	—	—	0–0	—	1–1	—	—	5–1	0–3	1–1
Jeonnam Dragons	1–1	—	3–1	1–2	0–2	3–0	—	—	0–0	—	—	—	—
Seongnam FC	—	1–1	—	—	2–2	—	2–3	1–1	—	0–1	—	—	1–2
Seoul E-Land	—	1–0	—	—	—	—	1–2	0–2	—	0–4	1–0	—	2–0
Suwon Samsung Bluewings	2–1	1–0	—	0–1	1–2	—	2–1	—	—	2–1	—	—	—

Source: Soccerway
Legend: Blue = home team win; Yellow = draw; Red = away team win.

== Promotion play-offs ==
The first round was contested between the fourth and fifth-placed teams of the regular season at the home stadium of the fourth-placed team, and its winners played the third-placed team in the second round. When the first and second round matches were finished as draws, their winners were decided on the regular season rankings without extra time and penalty shoot-outs.

The winners of the second round, and the league runners-up competed with the tenth and eleventh-placed teams of the 2024 K League 1, respectively, in the final round. Each of the finals was a two-legged tie, with the winners securing the final spots in the 2025 K League 1.

=== Bracket ===
First round
4	Jeonnam Dragons	0
5	Busan IPark	0

Second round
3	Seoul E-Land	2
4	Jeonnam Dragons	2

Final 1
Seoul E-Land	1	1	2
Jeonbuk Hyundai Motors	2	2	4
Final 2
Chungnam Asan	4	1	5
Daegu FC (a.e.t.)	3	3	6

=== First round ===
21 November 2024
19:00 UTC+9

Jeonnam Dragons	0–0	Busan IPark

Gwangyang Football Stadium, Gwangyang
Attendance: 6,375
Referee: Seol Tae-Hwan

=== Second round ===
24 November 2024
16:30 UTC+9

Seoul E-Land	2–2	Jeonnam Dragons
Kim Shin-jin 78'; Baek Ji-ung 81'		Placca 49'; Yoon Jae-seok 76'

Mokdong Stadium, Seoul
Attendance: 6,199
Referee: Choi Gwang-ho

=== Final round ===
Team 1	Agg.	Team 2	1st leg	2nd leg
Chungnam Asan	5–6	Daegu FC	4–3	1–3 (a.e.t.)
Seoul E-Land	2–4	Jeonbuk Hyundai Motors	1–2	1–2

28 November 2024
19:00 UTC+9

Chungnam Asan	4–3	Daegu FC
Park Dae-hoon 11', 44'; Juninho Rocha 14'; Denisson Silva 69'		Go Jae-hyun 45+1'; Cesinha 87', 90+4'

Cheonan Stadium, Cheonan
Attendance: 4,200
Referee: Kim Woo-sung
1 December 2024
14:00 UTC+9

Daegu FC	3–1 (a.e.t.)	Chungnam Asan
Cesinha 45+5'; Edgar 83'; Lee Chan-dong 93'		Juninho Rocha 90+8' (pen.)

DGB Daegu Bank Park, Daegu
Attendance: 11,973
Referee: Ko Hyung-jin

Daegu FC won 6–5 on aggregate and therefore both clubs remain in their respective leagues.

1 December 2024
16:00 UTC+9

Seoul E-Land	1–2	Jeonbuk Hyundai Motors
Osmar 49'		Tiago Orobó 38'; Jeon Jin-woo 83'

Mokdong Stadium, Seoul
Attendance: 13,205
Referee: Shin Yong-jun
8 December 2024
14:25 UTC+9

Jeonbuk Hyundai Motors	2–1	Seoul E-Land
Tiago Orobó 50'; Moon Seon-min 90+8'		Bruno Silva 45+1'

Jeonju World Cup Stadium, Jeonju
Attendance: 23,772
Referee: Kim Jong-hyeok

Jeonbuk Hyundai Motors won 4–2 on aggregate and therefore both clubs remain in their respective leagues.

== Statistics ==
=== Top goalscorers ===
Rank	Player	Team	Goals
1	(Brazil) Bruno Mota	Cheonan City	16
2	(Colombia) Luis Mina	Gimpo FC	15
3	(South Korea) Kim Jong-min	Jeonnam Dragons	12
3	(Colombia) Leonardo Acevedo	Seongnam FC	12
3	(Brazil) Valdívia	Jeonnam Dragons	12
3	(Brazil) Juninho Rocha	Chungnam Asan	12
7	(Brazil) Bruno Silva	Seoul E-Land	11
7	(Brazil) Fessin	Busan IPark	11
7	(Brazil) Rodrigo Bassani	Bucheon FC 1995	11
10	(Brazil) Paulo Henrique	Cheonan City; Suwon Samsung Bluewings	10
10	(Serbia) Fejsal Mulić	Suwon Samsung Bluewings	10
10	(South Korea) Byeon Gyung-jun	Seoul E-Land	10

=== Top assist providers ===
Rank	Player	Team	Assists
1	(Brazil) Matheus Oliveira	FC Anyang	11
2	(Brazil) Bruno Lamas	Busan IPark	9
3	(Brazil) Juninho Rocha	Chungnam Asan	8
4	(South Korea) Park Min-seo	Seoul E-Land	7
4	(Brazil) Rodrigo Bassani	Bucheon FC 1995	7
4	(South Korea) Kim Myung-soon	Chungbuk Cheongju	7
7	(South Korea) Kim Hyun	Suwon Samsung Bluewings	6
7	(Brazil) Bruno Silva	Seoul E-Land	6
7	(Colombia) Jhon Montaño	Jeonnam Dragons; Seoul E-Land	6
7	(South Korea) Kim Seung-ho	Chungnam Asan	6
7	(South Korea) Kang Jun-hyuk	Chungnam Asan	6
7	(Brazil) Yago César	FC Anyang	6
7	(South Korea) Byeon Gyung-jun	Seoul E-Land	6

== Awards ==
=== Weekly awards ===
Round	Player of the Round	
Round	Player	Club
1	(Serbia) Fejsal Mulić	Suwon Samsung Bluewings
2	(South Korea) Kim Chan	Busan IPark
3	(South Korea) Han Ho-gang	Suwon Samsung Bluewings
4	(Brazil) Matheus Oliveira	FC Anyang
5	(Brazil) Bruno Mota	Cheonan City
6	(South Korea) Lim Min-hyeok	Busan IPark
7	(Brazil) Matheus Oliveira	FC Anyang
8	(Brazil) Fessin	Busan IPark
9	(Brazil) Bruno Silva	Seoul E-Land
10	(Georgia (country)) Bachana Arabuli	Gyeongnam FC
11	(Colombia) Leonardo Acevedo	Seongnam FC
12	(United States) Eduvie Ikoba	Seoul E-Land
13	(Kosovo) Leonard Pllana	Gimpo FC
14	(Brazil) Bruno Mota	Cheonan City
15	(Portugal) Jucie Lupeta	Bucheon FC 1995
16	(South Korea) Kim Jong-min	Jeonnam Dragons
17	(South Korea) Kim Jeong-hwan	Seongnam FC
18	(South Korea) Hong Won-jin	Chungbuk Cheongju
19	(Brazil) Juninho Rocha	Chungnam Asan
20	(Chile) Josepablo Monreal	Chungnam Asan

Round	Player of the Round	
Round	Player	Club
21	(Australia) Lachlan Wales	Gyeongnam FC
22	(South Korea) Ha Nam	Jeonnam Dragons
23	(South Korea) Lee Dong-soo	Busan IPark
24	(South Korea) Kim Ji-ho	Suwon Samsung Bluewings
25	(Brazil) Felipe Saraiva	Gyeongnam FC
26	(South Korea) Kim Ji-ho	Suwon Samsung Bluewings
27	(Brazil) Rodrigo Bassani	Bucheon FC 1995
28	(South Korea) Lee Ji-sung	Ansan Greeners
29	(Colombia) Luis Mina	Gimpo FC
30	(Brazil) Bruno Mota	Cheonan City
31	(South Korea) Kang Jun-hyuk	Chungnam Asan
32	(South Korea) Kim Jong-suk	Chungnam Asan
33	(South Korea) Son Jung-hyun	Gimpo FC
34	(Brazil) Bruno Mota	Cheonan City
35	(South Korea) Yoo Jeong-wan	FC Anyang
36	(Mali) Aboubacar Toungara	Cheonan City
37	(South Korea) Byeon Gyung-jun	Seoul E-Land
38	(South Korea) Byeon Gyung-jun	Seoul E-Land
39	(Togo) Euloge Placca	Jeonnam Dragons

=== Annual awards ===
The 2024 K League Awards was held on 29 November 2024.

Award	Winner	Club
Most Valuable Player	(Brazil) Matheus Oliveira	FC Anyang
Young Player of the Year	(South Korea) Seo Jae-min	Seoul E-Land
Top goalscorer	(Brazil) Bruno Mota	Cheonan City
Top assist provider	(Brazil) Matheus Oliveira	FC Anyang
Manager of the Year	(South Korea) Ryu Byeong-hoon	FC Anyang

Position	Best XI			
Goalkeeper	(South Korea) Kim Da-sol (Anyang)			
Defenders	(South Korea) Lee Tae-hee (Anyang)	(South Korea) Lee Chang-yong (Anyang)	(Spain) Osmar (Seoul E)	(South Korea) Kim Dong-jin (Anyang)
Midfielders	(Brazil) Juninho Rocha (Chungnam Asan)	(Brazil) Valdívia (Jeonnam)	(South Korea) Kim Jeong-hyun (Anyang)	(Colombia) Luis Mina (Gimpo)
Forwards	(Brazil) Bruno Mota (Cheonan)		(Brazil) Matheus Oliveira (Anyang)	

== Attendance ==
Attendants who entered with free ticket were not counted.

Pos	Team	Total	High	Low	Average	Change
1	Suwon Samsung Bluewings	186,519	15,308	4,429	10,362	−12.2%^{†}
2	FC Anyang	94,505	13,451	2,231	5,205	+72.0%
3	Seoul E-Land	72,093	9,123	1,537	4,005	+10.7%
4	Jeonnam Dragons	70,445	7,295	1,042	3,914	+88.8%
5	Gyeongnam FC	66,131	7,649	1,933	3,674	+10.9%
6	Bucheon FC 1995	65,982	8,604	1,602	3,666	+22.8%
7	Chungbuk Cheongju	57,443	10,635	1,060	3,191	+27.1%
8	Busan IPark	55,277	7,191	1,350	3,071	−14.4%
9	Seongnam FC	53,607	8,252	914	2,978	+42.0%
10	Gimpo FC	50,317	7,068	1,274	2,795	+29.3%
11	Chungnam Asan	44,769	10,022	1,034	2,487	+12.3%
12	Cheonan City	39,893	10,432	550	2,216	+91.5%
13	Ansan Greeners	32,144	8,264	384	1,786	+51.9%
	League total	889,125	15,308	384	3,800	+58.9%

Source: K League
Notes:
^{†} Team played previous season in K League 1.

== See also ==
- 2024 K League 1
