= Kazuki Takahashi (disambiguation) =

Kazuki Takahashi (1961–2022) was a Japanese manga artist and game creator.

Kazuki Takahashi may also refer to:

- Kazuki Takahashi (footballer, born 1996)
- Kazuki Takahashi (footballer, born 1999)
