= Jonathan Castillo =

Jonathan Castillo may refer to:

- Jonathan Castillo (footballer, born 1993)
- Jonathan Castillo (footballer, born 2001)
