= Bruno Lamas =

Brazilian footballer (born 1994)

Personal information
- Full name: Bruno José Pavan Lamas
- Date of birth: 13 April 1994 (age 32)
- Place of birth: Ilha Solteira, Brazil
- Height: 1.76 m (5 ft 9 1/2 in)
- Position: Midfielder

Team information
- Current team: Cheonan City FC
- Number: 99

Youth career
- 2008–2009: São Paulo
- 2010–2012: Santos
- 2013: Cruzeiro

Senior career*
Years	Team	Apps	(Gls)
2014	Cruzeiro	1	(1)
2014	→ São Caetano (loan)		
2015–2018	Leixões	131	(19)
2018–2020	Santa Clara	36	(2)
2020–2021	Khor Fakkan	33	(3)
2021–2022	Daegu FC	32	(3)
2022–2024	Busan IPark	85	(21)
2025	Daegu FC	31	(4)
2026–	Cheonan City FC	19	(7)
- * Club domestic league appearances and goals as of 6 August 2026

Bruno José Pavan Lamas is a Brazilian professional footballer who plays for Cheonan City FC.

== Club career ==
He made his professional debut in the Segunda Liga for Leixões on 22 February 2015 against Desportivo das Aves.

In 2021, he transferred to the South Korean side Daegu FC in the K-League.

After his debut season in South Korea, Bruno transferred to Busan IPark, another South Korean club.

== Career statistics ==
As of 27 May 2024

Club	Season	League			Cup		League Cup		Continental		Other		Total	
Club	Season	Division	Apps	Goals	Apps	Goals	Apps	Goals	Apps	Goals	Apps	Goals	Apps	Goals
Leixões	2014-15	Liga Portugal 2	15	2	—		—		—		—		15	2
Leixões	2015-16	Liga Portugal 2	43	7	—		4	2	—		—		47	9
Leixões	2016-17	Liga Portugal 2	38	5	2	1	1	1	—		2 (Note: Appearance(s) in Segunda Division promotion/relegation play-off)	1	43	8
Leixões	2017-18	Liga Portugal 2	34	5	1	0	3	1	—		—		38	6
Leixões	Total		130	19	3	1	8	4	—		2	1	143	25
Santa Clara	2018-19	Primeira Liga	33	2	1	0	1	0	—		—		35	2
Santa Clara	2019-20	Primeira Liga	11	0	2	0	4	0	—		—		17	0
Santa Clara	Total		44	2	3	0	5	0	—		—		52	2
Khor Fakkan	2019-20	UAE Pro League	7	0	—		—		—		—		7	0
Khor Fakkan	2020-21	UAE Pro League	26	3	—		4	1	—		—		30	4
Khor Fakkan	Total		33	3	—		4	1	—		—		37	4
Daegu FC	2021	K League 1	17	0	3	2	—		1 (Note: Appearance(s) in AFC Champions League)	0	—		21	2
Daegu FC	2022	K League 1	18	3	2	0	—		7	1	—		27	4
Daegu FC			35	3	5	2	—		8	1	—		48	6
Busan IPark	2022	K League 2	15	2	—		—		—		—		15	2
Busan IPark	2023	K League 2	33	10	—		—		—		2 (Note: Appearance(s) in K League 2 Promotion play-offs)	2	35	12
Busan IPark	2024	K League 2	14	4	—		—		—		—		14	4
Busan IPark	Total		62	16	—		—		—		2	2	64	18
