= Jucie Lupeta =

Portuguese footballer

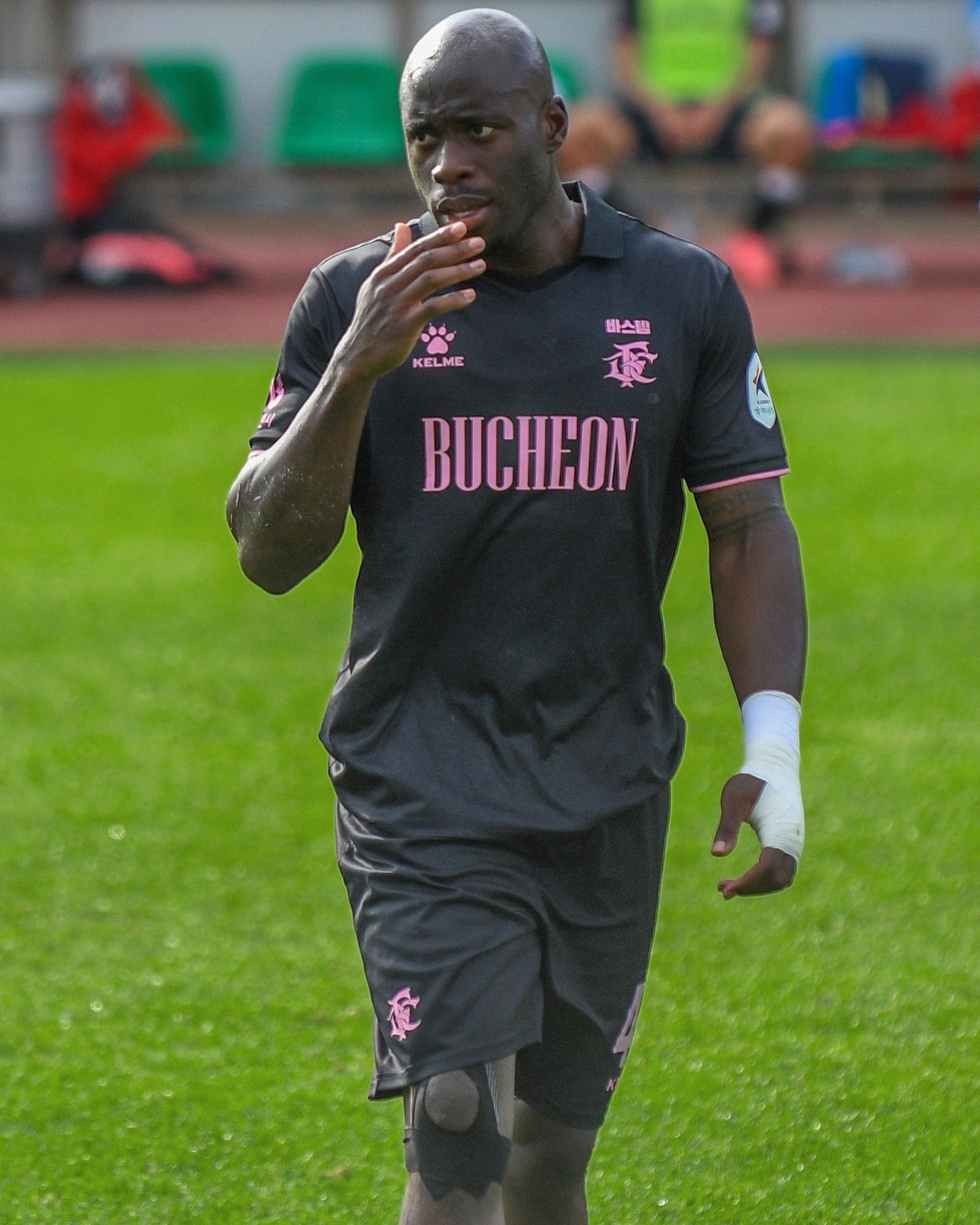
- Lupeta in 2024

Personal information
- Full name: Joaquim Manuel Welo Lupeta
- Date of birth: 24 March 1993 (age 33)
- Place of birth: Lourinhã, Portugal
- Height: 1.86 m (6 ft 1 in)
- Position: Forward

Team information
- Current team: Hải Phòng
- Number: 42

Youth career
- 2004–2006: Lourinhanense
- 2006–2012: Porto
- 2008–2009: → Padroense (loan)

Senior career*
Years	Team	Apps	(Gls)
2013–2014	Videoton	5	(0)
2014–2015	Vitória Setúbal	12	(1)
2015–2016	Bidvest Wits	12	(0)
2016	Ajax Cape Town	5	(0)
2017–2018	Celje	46	(7)
2018–2020	Olimpija Ljubljana	33	(9)
2020–2021	Maccabi Petah Tikva	10	(0)
2021	Argeș Pitești	5	(0)
2021–2022	Botoșani	15	(1)
2022–2023	Maccabi Kabilio Jaffa	32	(11)
2023–2024	Bucheon	46	(8)
2025	Nanjing City	15	(7)
2026–	Hải Phòng	8	(0)

International career
2010–2011	Portugal U18	9	(4)
- * Club domestic league appearances and goals as of 7 June 2026

Joaquim 'Jucie' Manuel Welo Lupeta (born 24 March 1993) is a Portuguese professional footballer who plays for V.League 1 club Hải Phòng as a forward.

== Club career ==
Born in Lourinhã, Lisbon, Lupeta played youth football for three clubs, including FC Porto between 2006 and 2012. In May 2013, he joined Hungarian side Videoton FC. He featured rarely in his one-year tenure, playing 14 official matches and scoring five goals in the Ligakupa to help his team reach the final.

In summer 2014, Lupeta returned to his country and signed a two-year contract with Vitória de Setúbal. He scored his only goal in the Primeira Liga in his third appearance in the competition, starting and contributing to a 2–0 home win against C.D. Nacional.

Lupeta subsequently competed in the South African Premier Division, in representation of Bidvest Wits F.C. and Ajax Cape Town FC. On 25 February 2017, he joined NK Celje of the Slovenian PrvaLiga.

In late August 2018, Lupeta moved to NK Olimpija Ljubljana in the same country and league on a three-year deal. On 2 September, he helped the hosts beat NK Rudar Velenje 5–0 by netting in the 34th minute through a bicycle kick.

On 5 November 2020, Lupeta terminated his contract with Olimpija and joined Israeli team Maccabi Petah Tikva FC. In June 2021 he moved to the Romanian Liga I, having a very brief spell with FC Argeș Pitești before signing a two-year deal with FC Botoșani.

== International career ==
Lupeta represented Portugal at under-18 level. He scored on his debut on 25 November 2010, in a 5–0 friendly rout of Montenegro held in Agualva-Cacém.

== Personal life ==
Lupeta is of Congolese descent. Outside of his football career, he is also an entrepreneur and has his own brand of clothing.

In 2018, Lupeta started a relationship with Slovenian model Lara Kolar.

== Career statistics ==
As of match played 2 November 2024

Appearances and goals by club, season and competition
Club	Season	League			Cup		League Cup		Continental		Other		Total	
Club	Season	Division	Apps	Goals	Apps	Goals	Apps	Goals	Apps	Goals	Apps	Goals	Apps	Goals
Videoton	2012–13	NB I	3	0	—		—		—		—		3	0
Videoton	2013–14	NB I	2	0	1	0	8	5	0	0	—		11	5
Videoton	Total		5	0	1	0	8	5	0	0	—		14	5
Vitória Setúbal	2014–15	Primeira Liga	12	1	—		2	0	—		—		14	1
Bidvest Wits	2015–16	South African Premier Division	12	1	1	0	1	0	—		—		14	1
Ajax Cape Town	2016–17	South African Premier Division	5	0	—		1	0	—		—		6	0
Celje	2016–17	Slovenian PrvaLiga	10	2	—		—		—		—		10	2
Celje	2017–18	Slovenian PrvaLiga	31	3	6	1	—		—		—		37	4
Celje	2018–19	Slovenian PrvaLiga	5	2	1	1	—		—		—		6	3
Celje	Total		46	7	7	2	—		—		—		53	9
Olimpija Ljubljana	2018–19	Slovenian PrvaLiga	20	5	4	0	—		—		—		24	5
Olimpija Ljubljana	2019–20	Slovenian PrvaLiga	12	4	1	0	—		—		—		13	4
Olimpija Ljubljana	2020–21	Slovenian PrvaLiga	1	0	—		—		1 (Note: Appearance in UEFA Europa League)	0	—		2	0
Olimpija Ljubljana	Total		33	9	5	0	—		1	0	—		39	9
Maccabi Petah Tikva	2020–21	Israeli Premier League	10	0	0	0	0	0	0	0	—		10	0
Argeș Pitești	2021–22	Liga I	5	0	—		—		—		—		5	0
Botoșani	2021–22	Liga I	15	1	1	0	—		—		—		16	1
Maccabi Kabilio Jaffa	2022–23	Liga Leumit	32	11	1	1	1	0	—		—		34	12
Bucheon	2023	K League 2	15	1	—		—		—		1	0	16	1
Bucheon	2024	K League 2	31	7	2	0	—		—		—		33	7
Bucheon	Total		46	8	2	0	—		—		1	0	49	8
Career total			221	38	18	3	13	5	1	0	1	0	254	46

== Honours ==
Videoton

- Ligakupa runner-up: 2013–14

Olimpija Ljubljana

- Slovenian Football Cup: 2018–19
