= Yago (footballer, born 1997) =

Brazilian footballer

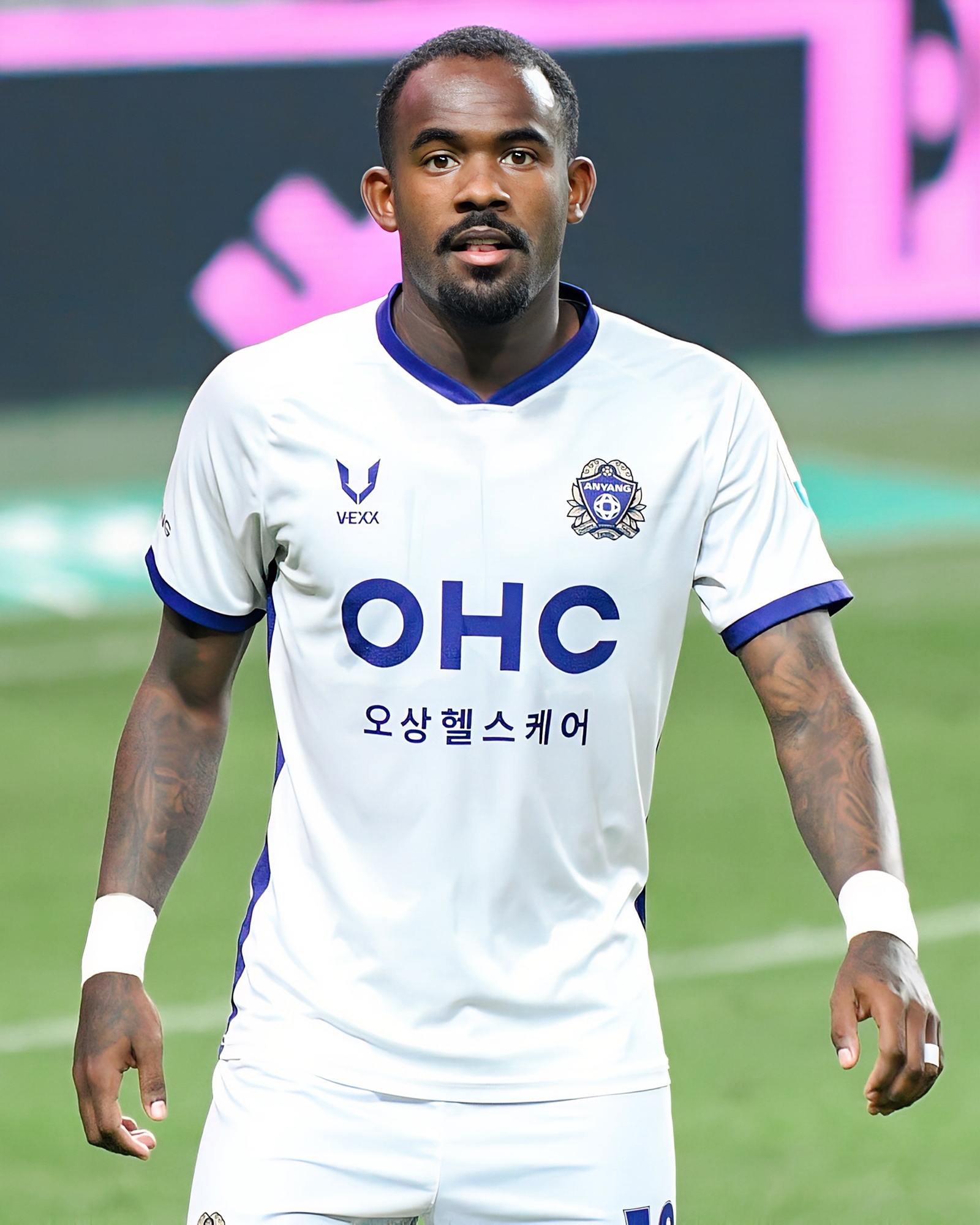
- Yago in 2025

Personal information
- Full name: Yago César da Silva
- Date of birth: 26 May 1997 (age 29)
- Place of birth: Taboão da Serra, Brazil
- Height: 1.69 m (5 ft 7 in)
- Position: Forward

Team information
- Current team: Johor Darul Ta'zim
- Number: 10

Youth career
- Athletico Paranaense

Senior career*
Years	Team	Apps	(Gls)
2016–2023	Athletico Paranaense	36	(0)
2017	→ Juventude (loan)	16	(1)
2018–2019	→ BUAP (loan)	21	(3)
2019	→ Paços de Ferreira (loan)	3	(0)
2020	→ Ituano (loan)	8	(1)
2020–2021	→ Cuiabá (loan)	35	(2)
2021	→ CSA (loan)	17	(0)
2022	→ Guarani (loan)	42	(0)
2023	→ Ituano (loan)	10	(1)
2023–2025	FC Anyang	95	(16)
2025–	Johor Darul Ta'zim	7	(1)
- * Club domestic league appearances and goals as of 11 April 2026

Yago César da Silva (born 26 May 1997), known as Yago, is a Brazilian footballer who plays as a forward for Malaysia Super League club Johor Darul Ta'zim.

== Club career ==
On 29 July 2019, Yago joined Primeira Liga club Paços de Ferreira on a season-long loan with an option to buy.

In March 2023, Yago signed for K League 2 club FC Anyang.

== Career statistics ==
As of match played 30 November 2025.

Appearances and goals by club, season and competition
Club	Season	League			State League		National Cup		League Cup		Continental		Other		Total	
Club	Season	Division	Apps	Goals	Apps	Goals	Apps	Goals	Apps	Goals	Apps	Goals	Apps	Goals	Apps	Goals
Athletico Paranaense	2016	Série A	6	0	0	0	0	0	—		—		—		6	0
Athletico Paranaense	2017	Série A	3	0	12	0	2	0	—		0	0	—		17	0
Athletico Paranaense	2018	Série A	0	0	14	0	0	0	—		0	0	—		14	0
Athletico Paranaense	2021	Série A	0	0	6	0	0	0	—		1	0	—		7	0
Athletico Paranaense	Total		9	0	32	0	2	0	—		1	0	—		44	0
Juventude (loan)	2017	Série B	16	1	—		—		—		—		—		16	1
BUAP (loan)	2018–19	Liga MX	21	3	—		0	0	—		—		—		21	3
Paços de Ferreira (loan)	2019–20	Primeira Liga	3	0	—		1	0	1	0	—		—		5	0
Ituano (loan)	2020	Série C	—		8	1	—		—		—		—		8	1
Cuiabá (loan)	2020	Série B	31	2	—		4	0	—		—		—		35	2
CSA (loan)	2021	Série B	17	0	—		—		—		—		0	0	17	0
Guarani (loan)	2022	Série B	30	0	10	0	2	0	—		—		—		42	0
Ituano (loan)	2023	Série B	—		10	1	1	0	—		—		—		11	1
FC Anyang	2023	K League 2	31	6	—		1	0	—		—		—		32	6
FC Anyang	2024	K League 2	33	6	—		1	0	—		—		—		34	6
FC Anyang	2025	K League 1	31	4	—		2	0	—		—		—		33	4
FC Anyang	Total		95	16	—		4	0	—		—		—		99	16
Career total			222	22	60	2	14	0	1	0	1	0	0	0	298	24
