= Matheus Oliveira (footballer, born 1997) =

Brazilian footballer

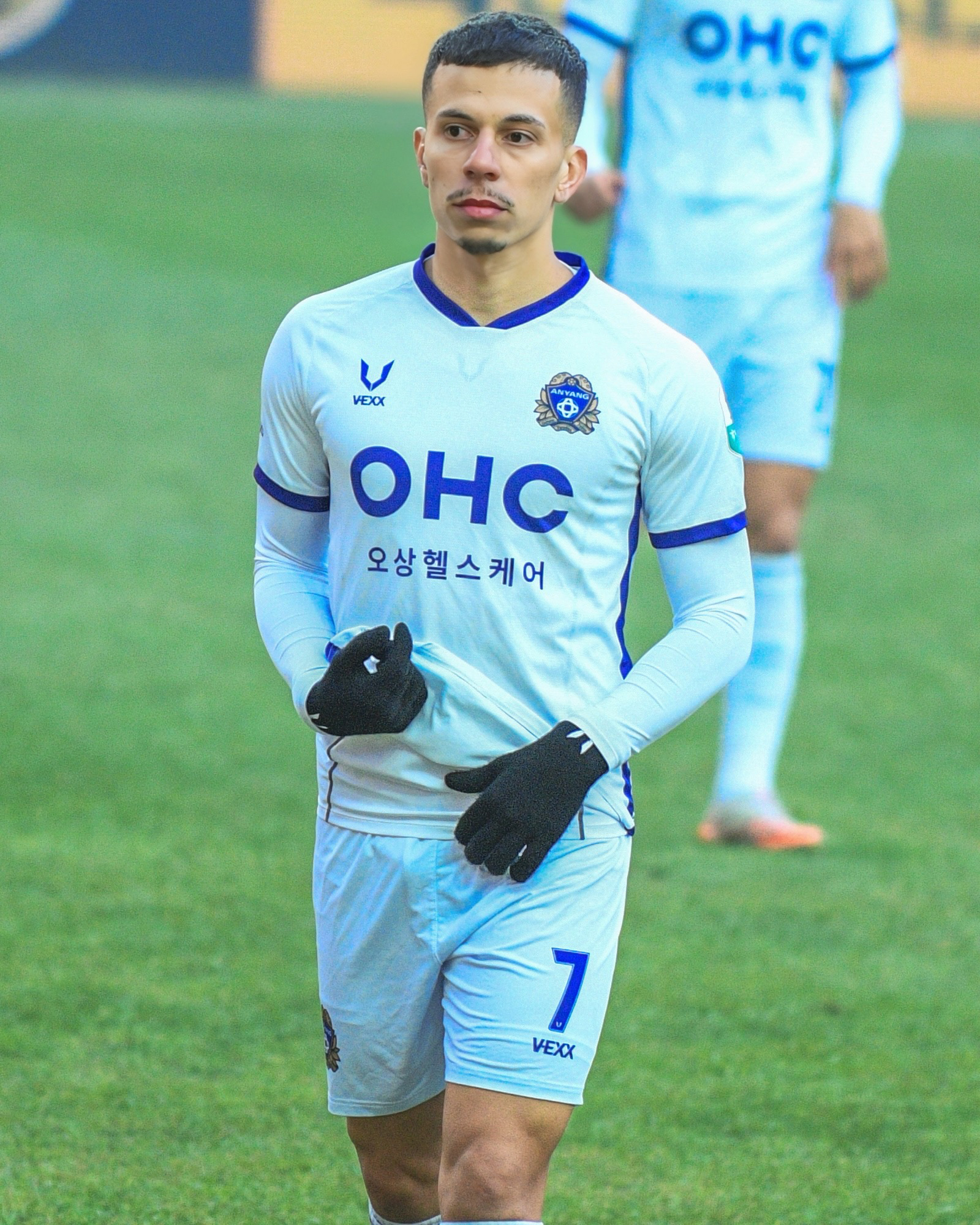
- Oliveira with FC Anyang in 2025

Personal information
- Full name: Matheus Oliveira Santos
- Date of birth: 28 September 1997 (age 29)
- Place of birth: São Paulo, Brazil
- Height: 1.73 m (5 ft 8 in)
- Position: Attacking midfielder

Team information
- Current team: FC Anyang
- Number: 7

Youth career
- 2009–2013: Audax
- 2013–2016: Santos

Senior career*
Years	Team	Apps	(Gls)
2016–2019	Santos	2	(0)
2018	→ Red Bull Brasil (loan)	8	(1)
2018	→ Guarani (loan)	22	(2)
2019	→ Ponte Preta (loan)	14	(0)
2019	Ponte Preta (loan)	3	(0)
2019–2021	Oeste	29	(0)
2020–2021	→ Brasil de Pelotas (loan)	30	(6)
2021	Atlético Goianiense	7	(1)
2021–2022	Remo	19	(0)
2022	Água Santa	7	(0)
2022	Mirassol	15	(2)
2023	Inter de Limeira	13	(1)
2023	São Bernardo	20	(2)
2024–	FC Anyang	90	(25)
- * Club domestic league appearances and goals as of 3 August 2026

Matheus Oliveira Santos (born 28 September 1997), known as Matheus Oliveira, is a Brazilian footballer who plays as an attacking midfielder for FC Anyang.

== Club career ==
=== Santos ===
Born in São Paulo, Matheus started to play football at Audax before joining Santos. In September 2013, he joined Santos' youth setup at the age of 17.

Matheus renewed his contract until 2019 on 26 April 2016, and was promoted to the first team by manager Dorival Júnior in August. On 8 October, he made his unofficial first team debut, playing the last 30 minutes and assisting Fabián Noguera's goal in a 1–1 friendly draw against Benfica. The following 29 March, he made his professional debut as a substitute for Léo Cittadini in a 3–1 Campeonato Paulista win against Novorizontino. On 16 September 2017, he replaced Cittadini again in a 2–0 Série A loss against Botafogo, making his Série A debut.

On 6 January 2018, Matheus was loaned to Red Bull Brasil until the end of the year's Paulistão. On 10 February, he scored his first senior goal, netting the equaliser in a 1–1 draw against São Caetano.

=== FC Anyang ===
After playing for several clubs at Série B and C, on 10 January 2024, Matheus signed for K League 2 club FC Anyang, settling in South Korea. In his first season at Anyang, he provided the most assists at the K League 2, helping the club promote to the K League 1 for the first time. He was selected as the K League 2 Most Valuable Player. In the 2025 season, he scored double-digit goals to save newly promoted Anyang at the first division.

== Career statistics ==
As of match played 30 November 2025

Appearances and goals by club, season and competition
Club	Season	League			State league		Cup		Continental		Other		Total	
Club	Season	Division	Apps	Goals	Apps	Goals	Apps	Goals	Apps	Goals	Apps	Goals	Apps	Goals
Santos	2016	Série A	0	0	—		0	0	—		—		0	0
Santos	2017	Série A	1	0	1	0	0	0	0	0	—		2	0
Santos	2018	Série A	0	0	0	0	0	0	0	0	—		0	0
Santos	Total		1	0	1	0	0	0	0	0	—		2	0
Red Bull Brasil (loan)	2018	—			8	1	—		—		—		8	1
Guarani (loan)	2018	Série B	22	2	—		—		—		—		22	2
Ponte Preta (loan)	2019	Série B	1	0	13	0	1	0	—		—		15	0
Ponte Preta	2019	Série B	3	0	—	—	—		—		—		3	0
Oeste	2019	Série B	21	0	—		—		—		—		21	0
Oeste	2020	Série B	1	0	7	0	1	0	—		—		9	0
Oeste	Total		22	0	7	0	1	0	—		—		30	0
Brasil de Pelotas (loan)	2020	Série B	30	6	—		—		—		—		30	6
Atlético Goianiense	2021	Série A	0	0	7	1	2	0	2 (Note: Appearances in Copa Sudamericana)	0	—		11	1
Remo	2021	Série B	19	0	—		—		—		1 (Note: Appearance in Copa Verde)	0	20	0
Água Santa	2022	—			7	0	—		—		—		7	0
Mirassol	2022	Série C	15	2	—		—		—		—		15	2
Inter de Limeira	2023	Série D	—		13	1	—		—		—		13	1
São Bernardo	2023	Série C	20	2	—		—		—		—		20	2
FC Anyang	2024	K League 2	36	7	—		1	0	—		—		37	7
FC Anyang	2025	K League 1	35	10	—		0	0	—		—		35	10
FC Anyang	Total		71	17	—		1	0	—		—		72	17
Career total			204	29	56	3	5	0	2	0	1	0	268	32

== Honours ==
Mirassol

- Campeonato Brasileiro Série C: 2022

FC Anyang

- K League 2: 2024

Individual

- K League 2 Most Valuable Player: 2024
- K League 2 top assist provider: 2024
- K League 2 Best XI: 2024
- K League All-Star: 2026
