= Fessin =

Brazilian footballer (born 1999)

Personal information
- Full name: Jefferson Gabriel Nascimento Brito
- Date of birth: 4 January 1999 (age 27)
- Place of birth: Campina Grande, Brazil
- Height: 1.76 m (5 ft 9 in)
- Position: Forward

Team information
- Current team: Suwon Samsung Bluewings
- Number: 7

Youth career
- 2013–2015: Sport Campina Grande
- 2016–2017: ABC
- 2018: Corinthians

Senior career*
Years	Team	Apps	(Gls)
2017–2018	ABC	28	(6)
2018–2023	Corinthians	0	(0)
2020	→ Bahia (loan)	23	(1)
2021–2022	→ Ponte Preta (loan)	20	(4)
2023–2025	Busan IPark	93	(30)
2026–	Suwon Samsung Bluewings	7	(1)
- * Club domestic league appearances and goals as of 5 August 2026

Jefferson Gabriel Nascimento Brito (born 4 January 1999), commonly known as Fessin, is a Brazilian footballer who plays as a forward for Suwon Samsung Bluewings.

== Club career ==
Fessin was born in Campina Grande, Paraíba, and represented Sport Campina Grande and ABC as a youth. He made his senior debut with the latter's first team on 6 October 2017, starting in a 0–1 Série B away loss against CRB. He scored his first goal late in the month, netting the second of a 3–0 home win against Londrina.

On 14 April 2018, after impressing in the year's Campeonato Potiguar, Fessin moved to Corinthians for a fee of R$2 million for 80% of his economic rights. Assigned to the under-20s, he spent most of the 2019 campaign recovering from a broken leg.

On 16 December 2019, Fessin was loaned to fellow Série A side Bahia for the season.

On 7 January 2026, Fessin signed to fellow K League 2 club, Suwon Samsung Bluewings for 2026 season.

== Career statistics ==
As of 5 August 2026

Club	Season	League			State League		Cup		Continental		Other		Total	
Club	Season	Division	Apps	Goals	Apps	Goals	Apps	Goals	Apps	Goals	Apps	Goals	Apps	Goals
ABC	2017	Série B	13	1	0	0	—		—		0	0	13	1
ABC	2018	Série C	3	1	12	4	1	0	—		7 (Note: Appearance (s) in Copa do Nordeste)	2	23	7
ABC	Total		16	2	12	4	1	0	—		7	2	36	8
Corinthians	2018	Série A	0	0	—		—		—		—		0	0
Bahia (loan)	2020	Série A	19	1	4	0	0	0	3 (Note: Appearance (s) in Copa Sudamericana)	2	0	0	26	3
Ponte Preta (loan)	2021	Série B	25	4	—		—		—		—		25	4
Ponte Preta (loan)	2022	Série B	28	3	12	1	1	0	—		—		41	4
Ponte Preta (loan)	Total		53	7	12	1	1	0	—		—		66	8
Busan IPark	2023	K League 2	23	7	—		1	0	—		—		24	7
Busan IPark	2024	K League 2	34	11	—		1	0	—		—		35	11
Busan IPark	2025	K League 2	35	12	—		1	0	—		—		36	12
Suwon Samsung Bluewings	2026	K League 2	7	1	—		1	1	—		—		8	2
Total			187	41	28	5	6	1	3	2	7	2	231	51

== Honours ==
ABC

- Campeonato Potiguar: 2017, 2018

Bahia

- Campeonato Baiano: 2020
