= Danrlei (footballer, born 1995) =

Brazilian footballer

Personal information
- Full name: Danrlei Medeiros Moreira
- Date of birth: 21 November 1995 (age 30)
- Place of birth: Baião, Brazil
- Height: 1.83 m (6 ft 0 in)
- Position: Forward

Team information
- Current team: Daegu FC
- Number: 7

Senior career*
Years	Team	Apps	(Gls)
2020–2021	Independente de Tucuruí	24	(10)
2021–2022	Paysandu	38	(10)
2023	Chapecoense	27	(2)
2024	FC Anyang	19	(4)
2025	Ponte Preta	8	(0)
2025–2026	Gyeongnam FC	20	(7)
2026–	Daegu FC	3	(0)
- * Club domestic league appearances and goals as of 5 August 2026

Danrlei Medeiros Moreira (born 21 November 1995), simply known as Danrlei, is a Brazilian footballer who plays as a forward for Daegu FC.

== Career ==
Born in Vila de Calados, a quilombola community in the municipality of Baião, Pará, Danrlei worked with his family in the production of flour in his hometown while playing amateur football. In 2020, after a trial period, he signed a contract with Independente de Tucuruí.

Danrlei impressed with Independente during the 2021 Campeonato Paraense, scoring four goals in eight matches, and was presented at Paysandu on 2 June of that year. On 16 December, he signed a new one-year deal with the club.

On 25 November 2022, Danrlei joined Chapecoense on a one-year contract. On 7 December 2023, he was announced by Náutico, but asked to leave the club in the end of the month, after having an offer from abroad.

On 1 February 2024, Danrlei was announced at K League 2 side FC Anyang. On 7 January of the following year, he returned to his home country with Ponte Preta.

== Career statistics ==
As of 3 February 2025

Club	Season	League			State League		Cup		Continental		Other		Total	
Club	Season	Division	Apps	Goals	Apps	Goals	Apps	Goals	Apps	Goals	Apps	Goals	Apps	Goals
Independente de Tucuruí	2020	Série D	14	6	2	0	—		—		3 (Note: Appearance(s) in Copa Verde)	2	19	8
Independente de Tucuruí	2021	Paraense	—		8	4	—		—		—		8	4
Independente de Tucuruí	Total		14	6	10	4	—		—		3	2	27	12
Paysandu	2021	Série C	11	2	—		—		—		3	2	14	4
Paysandu	2022	Série C	15	3	12	5	2	1	—		6	1	35	10
Paysandu	Total		26	5	12	5	2	1	—		9	3	49	14
Chapecoense	2023	Série B	14	0	13	2	1	0	—		2 (Note: Appearance(s) in Copa Santa Catarina)	2	30	4
FC Anyang	2024	K League 2	19	4	—		—		—		—		19	4
Ponte Preta	2025	Série C	0	0	5	0	0	0	—		—		5	0
Career total			73	15	40	11	3	1	0	0	14	7	130	34

== Honours ==
Paysandu

- Campeonato Paraense: 2021
- Copa Verde: 2022

FC Anyang

- K League 2: 2024
