= Bruno Silva (footballer, born 2000) =

Brazilian footballer

Personal information
- Full name: Bruno da Silva Costa
- Date of birth: 28 March 2000 (age 26)
- Place of birth: Carazinho, Brazil
- Height: 1.76 m (5 ft 9 in)
- Position: Forward

Team information
- Current team: Suwon Samsung Bluewings
- Number: 58

Youth career
- –2019: Chapecoense
- 2019: → Atlético Mineiro (loan)

Senior career*
Years	Team	Apps	(Gls)
2018–2022	Chapecoense	86	(5)
2019–2020	→ Atlético Mineiro (loan)	5	(1)
2022–2023	Novorizontino	41	(2)
2023	CRB	15	(3)
2024	Seoul E-Land FC	25	(11)
2025–	Suwon Samsung Bluewings	32	(4)
- * Club domestic league appearances and goals as of 5 August 2026

Bruno da Silva Costa (born 28 March 2000), known as Bruno Silva or just Bruno, is a Brazilian footballer who plays as a forward for Suwon Samsung Bluewings.

== Career ==
On 9 January 2024, Bruno joined Seoul E-Land FC of South Korean second division K League 2.

== Career statistics ==
As of 11 March 2024

Club	Season	League			State League		Cup		Continental		Other		Total	
Club	Season	Division	Apps	Goals	Apps	Goals	Apps	Goals	Apps	Goals	Apps	Goals	Apps	Goals
Chapecoense	2018	Série A	31	1	10	1	3	0	2 (Note: Appearance(s) in Copa Libertadores)	0	—		46	2
Chapecoense	2019	Série A	1	0	5	0	2	0	0	0	—		8	0
Chapecoense	2020	Série B	12	3	0	0	0	0	—		—		12	3
Chapecoense	2021	Série A	22	0	5	0	1	0	—		1 (Note: Appearance(s) in Recopa Catarinense)	0	29	0
Chapecoense	Total		60	4	20	1	6	0	2	0	1	0	95	5
Atlético Mineiro (loan)	2020	Série A	2	0	3	1	0	0	0	0	—		5	1
Novorizontino	2022	Série B	15	1	8	0	—		—		—		23	1
Novorizontino	2023	Série B	1	0	17	1	—		—		—		18	1
Novorizontino	Total		16	1	25	1	—		—		—		41	2
CRB	2023	Série B	18	4	—		—		—		—		18	4
Seoul E-Land FC	2024	K League 2	2	1	—		—		—		—		2	1
Career total			98	10	48	3	6	0	2	0	1	0	161	13

== Honours ==
Atlético Mineiro

- Campeonato Mineiro: 2020

Chapecoense

- Campeonato Brasileiro Série B: 2020
