= Bruno Mota (footballer, born 1996) =

Brazilian footballer (born 1996

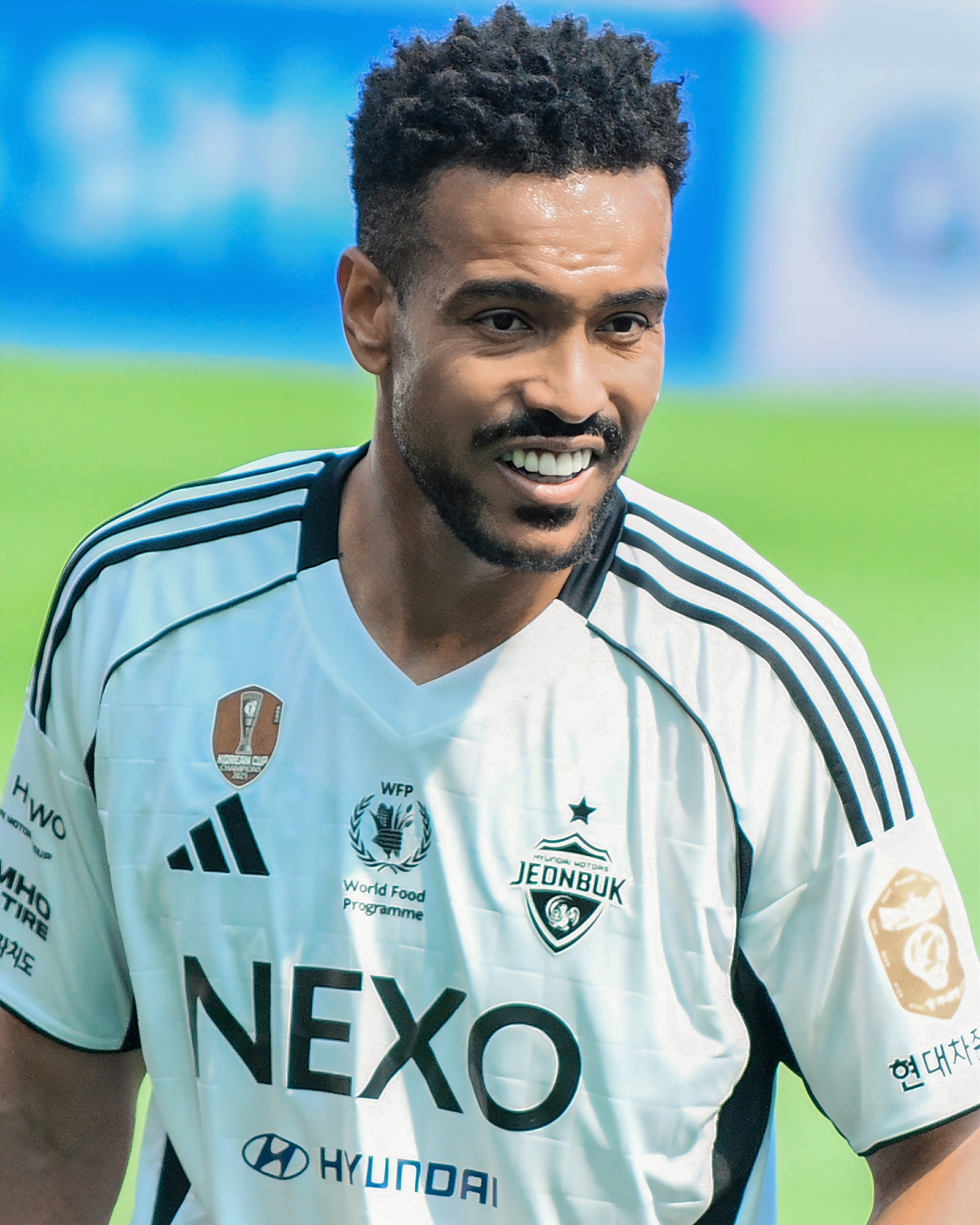
- Mota with Jeonbuk Hyundai Motors in 2026

Personal information
- Full name: Bruno Rodrigues Mota
- Date of birth: 10 February 1996 (age 30)
- Place of birth: Porto Alegre, Brazil
- Height: 1.94 m (6 ft 4 in)
- Position: Forward

Team information
- Current team: FC Anyang
- Number: 9

Youth career
- Cruzeiro
- Internacional

Senior career*
| Years | Team | Apps | (Gls) |
| 2018 | Brasiliense | 1 | (0) |
| 2018 | América-GO | 10 | (3) |
| 2018 | Fortaleza | 0 | (0) |
| 2018 | Calouros do Ar | 4 | (1) |
| 2019 | Goianésia | 13 | (5) |
| 2019 | Vila Nova | 12 | (1) |
| 2020–2022 | Mirassol | 6 | (0) |
| 2020 | → Ituano (loan) | 19 | (3) |
| 2021 | → Brusque (loan) | 14 | (3) |
| 2021 | → São José-RS (loan) | 14 | (1) |
| 2022 | → Camboriú (loan) | 16 | (6) |
| 2022–2024 | Cheonan City | 82 | (28) |
| 2025– | FC Anyang | 37 | (14) |
| 2026– | → Jeonbuk Hyundai Motors (loan) | 20 | (2) |
- * Club domestic league appearances and goals as of 3 August 2026

Bruno Rodrigues Mota (born 10 February 1996) is a Brazilian professional footballer who plays as a forward for South Korean club Jeonbuk Hyundai Motors, on loan from FC Anyang.

== Early life ==
Mota was born on 10 February 1996 in Porto Alegre, Brazil. A native of Espírito Santo, Brazil, he started playing football at the age of twelve. Growing up, he played as a midfielder before switching to forward.

== Career ==
Mota started his career with Brazilian side Fortaleza B. In 2019, he signed for Brazilian side Goianésia, where he made thirteen league appearances and scored five goals. The same year, he signed for Brazilian side Vila Nova, where he made twelve league appearances and scored one goal. Following his stint there, he signed for Brazilian side Mirassol in 2020, where he made six league appearances and scored zero goals. Six months later, he was sent on loan to Brazilian side Ituano, where he made nineteen league appearances and scored three goals.

Following his stint there, he was sent on loan to Brazilian side Brusque in 2021, where he made fourteen league appearances and scored three goals. Half a year later, he was sent on loan to Brazilian side São José, where he made fourteen league appearances and scored one goal. Subsequently, he was sent on loan to Brazilian side Camboriú in 2022, where he made sixteen league appearances and scored six goals. During the summer of 2022, he signed for South Korean side Cheonan City FC, where he was the top scorer of the 2024 K League 2 with sixteen goals. Ahead of the 2025 season, he signed for South Korean side FC Anyang.

== Style of play ==
Mota plays as a forward and is left-footed. Korean magazine FourFourTwo wrote in 2024 that he "possesses all the virtues that a front-line attacker should have, such as not only scoring, but also competing for possession and converting passes".

== Career statistics ==
As of match played 25 April 2026

Appearances and goals by club, season and competition
| Club | Season | League | | | State League | | Cup | | Continental | | Other | | Total | |
| Club | Season | Division | Apps | Goals | Apps | Goals | Apps | Goals | Apps | Goals | Apps | Goals | Apps | Goals |
|---|---|---|---|---|---|---|---|---|---|---|---|---|---|---|
| Brasiliense | 2018 | Série D | — | | 1 | 0 | — | | — | | — | | 1 | 0 |
| América-GO | 2018 | Goiano 2ª Divisão | — | | 10 | 3 | — | | — | | — | | 10 | 3 |
| Fortaleza | 2018 | Série B | — | | — | | — | | — | | 2 (Note: Appearance(s) in Copa Fares Lopes) | 1 | 2 | 1 |
| Calouros do Ar | 2018 | Cearense Série C | — | | 4 | 1 | — | | — | | — | | 4 | 1 |
| Goianésia | 2019 | Goiano | — | | 13 | 5 | — | | — | | — | | 13 | 5 |
| Vila Nova | 2019 | Série B | 12 | 1 | — | | 2 | 0 | — | | — | | 14 | 1 |
| Mirassol | 2020 | Série D | — | | 6 | 0 | — | | — | | — | | 6 | 0 |
| Ituano (loan) | 2020 | Série C | 19 | 3 | — | | — | | — | | — | | 19 | 3 |
| Brusque (loan) | 2021 | Série B | — | | 14 | 3 | 1 | 0 | — | | — | | 15 | 3 |
| São José-RS (loan) | 2021 | Série C | 14 | 1 | — | | — | | — | | — | | 14 | 1 |
| Camboriú (loan) | 2022 | Série C | — | | 16 | 6 | — | | — | | — | | 16 | 6 |
| Cheonan City | 2022 | K3 League | 12 | 2 | — | | — | | — | | — | | 12 | 2 |
| Cheonan City | 2023 | K League 2 | 35 | 10 | — | | 1 | 1 | — | | — | | 36 | 11 |
| Cheonan City | 2024 | K League 2 | 35 | 16 | — | | 1 | 0 | — | | — | | 36 | 16 |
| Cheonan City | Total | | 82 | 28 | — | | 2 | 1 | — | | — | | 84 | 29 |
| FC Anyang | 2025 | K League 1 | 37 | 14 | — | | 0 | 0 | — | | — | | 37 | 14 |
| Jeonbuk Hyundai Motors | 2026 | K League 1 | 9 | 2 | — | | 0 | 0 | — | | — | | 9 | 2 |
| Career total | | | 173 | 49 | 64 | 18 | 5 | 1 | 0 | 0 | 2 | 1 | 245 | 69 |
