= Kazuki Takahashi (footballer, born 1999) =

Japanese footballer

Kazuki Takahashi 髙橋 一輝
Personal information
- Date of birth: 2 October 1999 (age 27)
- Place of birth: Tokyo, Japan
- Height: 1.81 m (5 ft 11 in)
- Position: Forward

Youth career
- 2015–2017: Kiryu Daiichi HS
- 2018–2021: Osaka University of Health and Sport Sciences

Senior career*
| Years | Team | Apps | (Gls) |
| 2022–2023 | Tegevajaro Miyazaki | 43 | (0) |
- * Club domestic league appearances and goals as of 20 December 2023, 18:22 (UTC)

Kazuki Takahashi (髙橋 一輝, Takahashi Kazuki; born 2 October 1999) is a Japanese former footballer who playing as a forward.

== Club career ==
While studying at the Osaka University of Health and Sport Sciences, Kamiyama was announced as a Tegevajaro Miyazaki player ahead of the 2022 season.

On 4 December 2023, Takahashi was announce official retirement from football after end of the 2023 season for two years at Miyazaki.

== Career statistics ==
=== Club ===
As of the end 2023 season.

| Club | Season | League | | | National Cup | | League Cup | | Other | | Total | |
| Club | Season | Division | Apps | Goals | Apps | Goals | Apps | Goals | Apps | Goals | Apps | Goals |
|---|---|---|---|---|---|---|---|---|---|---|---|---|
| Tegevajaro Miyazaki | 2022 | J3 League | 20 | 0 | 0 | 0 | – | | 0 | 0 | 20 | 0 |
| Tegevajaro Miyazaki | 2023 | J3 League | 23 | 0 | 1 | 0 | – | | 0 | 0 | 24 | 0 |
| Career total | | | 43 | 0 | 1 | 0 | 0 | 0 | 0 | 0 | 44 | 0 |
