= Jhon Montaño =

Colombian footballer (born 1997)

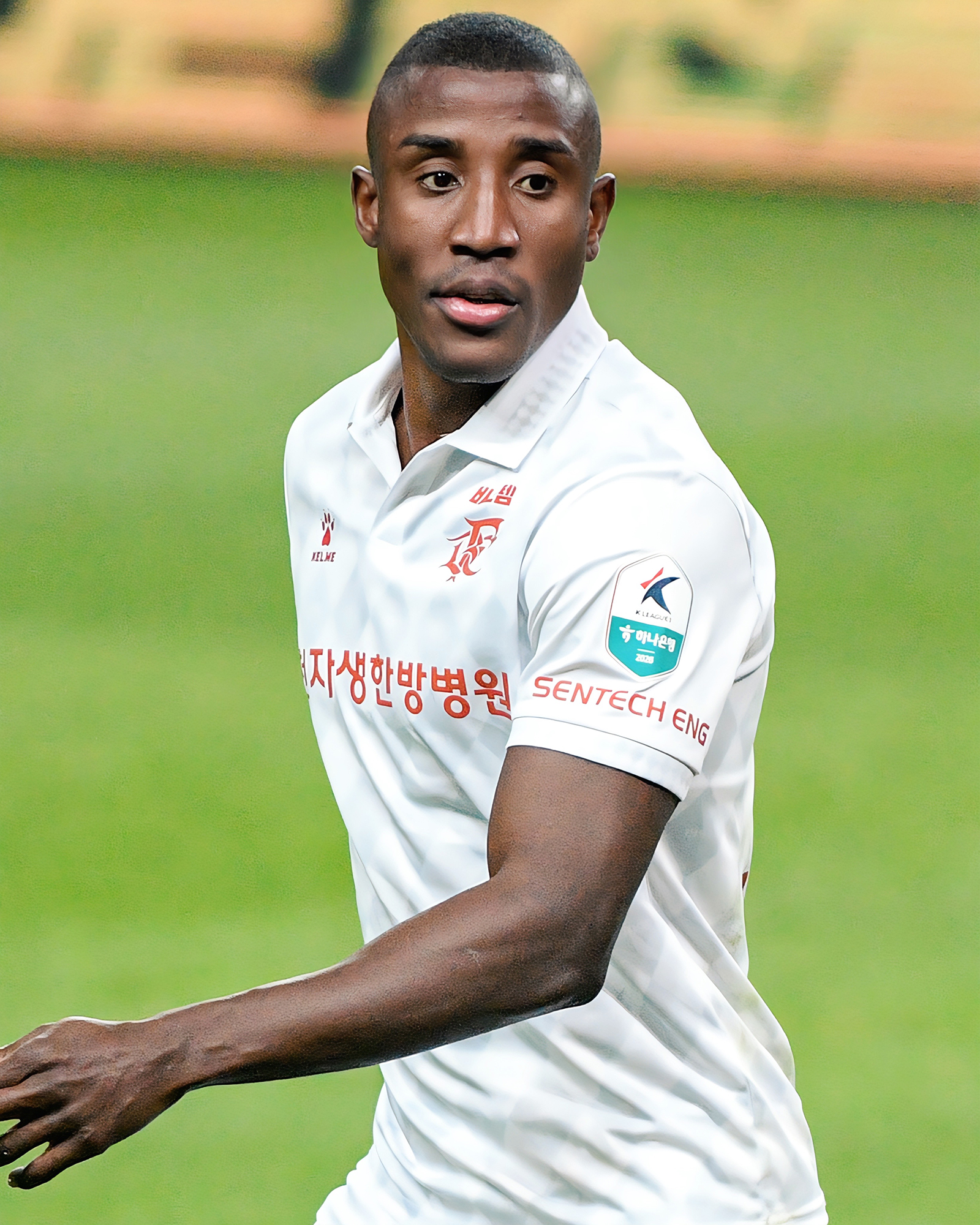
- Montaño in 2026

Personal information
- Full name: Jhon Franky Montaño Sinisterra
- Date of birth: 7 May 1997 (age 29)
- Place of birth: Tumaco, Colombia
- Height: 1.89 m (6 ft 2 in)
- Position: Forward

Team information
- Current team: Bucheon FC 1995
- Number: 9

Youth career
- América de Cali

Senior career*
Years	Team	Apps	(Gls)
2016–2017	América de Cali	0	(0)
2018	Rio Grande Valley	7	(0)
2018	Houston Dynamo	0	(0)
2019	Miami United	10	(7)
2020	Santiago Morning	6	(1)
2022–2023	Dragón	57	(28)
2024	Municipal Limeño	0	(0)
2024	Jeonnam Dragons	17	(3)
2024	Seoul E-Land FC	0	(0)
2025–	Bucheon FC 1995	37	(12)
- * Club domestic league appearances and goals as of 6 January 2026

Jhon Franky Montaño Sinisterra (born 7 May 1997), also known as Jhon Montaño, is a Colombian footballer who plays as a forward for South Korean club Bucheon FC 1995.

== Career ==
Montaño played with América de Cali, playing for the U-20 team and appearing for the first-team in the Copa Colombia in 2016 and 2017. He joined United Soccer League side Rio Grande Valley FC Toros in March 2018. In the second half of the same year, he joined Houston Dynamo FC.

He made his professional debut on 16 March 2018, playing in a 1–1 draw with Saint Louis FC.

In 2022, Montaño moved to El Salvador and joined Dragón. In December 2023, he signed with Municipal Limeño for the 2024 Clausura, but he switched to K League 2 side Jeonnam Dragons in January 2024.

On 27 July 2024, he moved to Seoul E-Land FC of the same league.
