= Denisson Silva =

Brazilian football player (born 1997)

Personal information
- Full name: José Denisson Silva dos Santos
- Date of birth: 29 November 1997 (age 28)
- Place of birth: Aracaju, Brazil
- Height: 1.71 m (5 ft 7 in)
- Position: Right midfielder

Team information
- Current team: Chungnam Asan
- Number: 11

Youth career
- –2017: Itabaiana

Senior career*
Years	Team	Apps	(Gls)
2017–2021	Braga B	53	(7)
2021–2022	Drenica	25	(7)
2022–2024	Dinamo Tirana	71	(20)
2024–	Chungnam Asan	69	(18)
- * Club domestic league appearances and goals as of 6 August 2026

José Denisson Silva dos Santos (born 29 November 1997), commonly known as Denisson Silva is a Brazilian professional footballer who plays as a right midfielder for South Korean K League 2 club Chungnam Asan.

== Club career ==
=== Drenica ===
On 19 January 2021, Silva joined Football Superleague of Kosovo side Drenica. His debut with Drenica came on 9 February in the 2020–21 Kosovar Cup round of 8 against Ulpiana after being named in the starting line-up.

== Career statistics ==
=== Club ===
As of 8 March 2022

Club	Season	League			Cup		Other		Total	
Club	Season	Division	Apps	Goals	Apps	Goals	Apps	Goals	Apps	Goals
Braga B	2017–18	LigaPro	14	2	0	0	—		14	2
Braga B	2018–19	LigaPro	27	4	0	0	—		27	4
Braga B	2019–20	Campeonato de Portugal	12	1	0	0	—		12	1
Braga B	2020–21	Campeonato de Portugal	0	0	0	0	—		0	0
Braga B	Total		53	7	0	0	—		53	7
Drenica	2020–21	Kosovo Superleague	10	2	1	0	—		11	2
Drenica	2021–22	Kosovo Superleague	15	5	0	0	—		15	5
Drenica	Total		25	7	1	0	—		26	7
Dinamo Tirana	2021–22	Kategoria Superiore	9	0	2	0	—		11	0
Career total			87	14	3	0	—		90	14
