= Aboubacar Ibrahima Toungara =

Malian footballer

Aboubacar Toungara
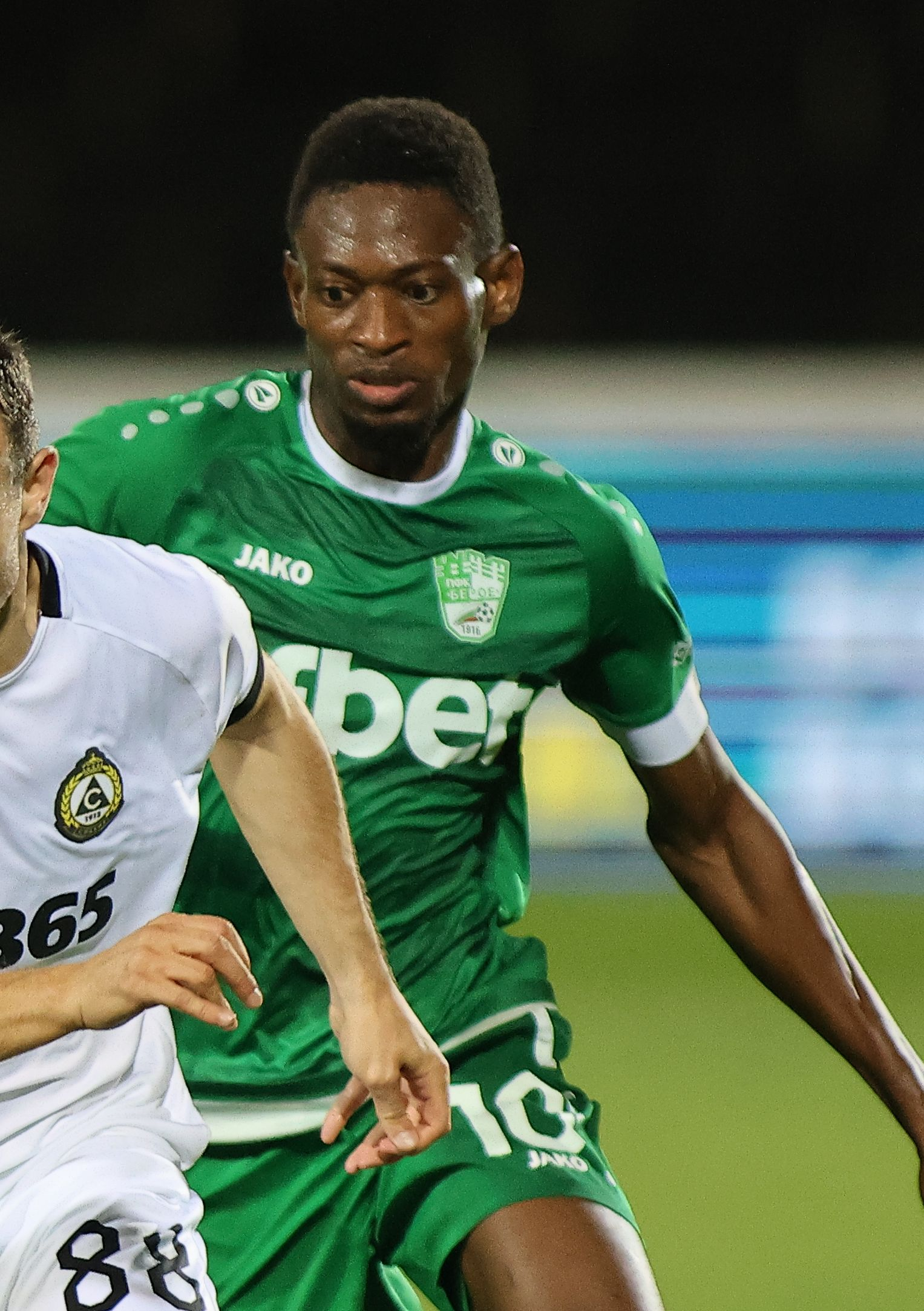
- Toungara with Beroe Stara Zagora in 2022

Personal information
- Full name: Aboubacar Ibrahima Toungara
- Date of birth: 15 November 1994 (age 31)
- Place of birth: Bamako, Mali
- Height: 1.78 m (5 ft 10 in)
- Position: Attacking midfielder

Team information
- Current team: Cheonan City FC
- Number: 11

Senior career*
Years	Team	Apps	(Gls)
2013–2016	JS Centre Salif Keita	3	(0)
2016–2017	Chabab Atlas Khenifra	27	(7)
2017–2021	FAR Rabat	115	(16)
2021–2023	Beroe	44	(13)
2023–2024	Arda Kardzhali	37	(6)
2024	Suwon Samsung Bluewings	16	(0)
2024-	Cheonan City FC	61	(15)
Total		188	(54)

International career
2013–2015	Mali U20	1	(0)
- * Club domestic league appearances and goals as of 6 August 2026

Aboubacar Ibrahima Toungara (born 15 November 1994) is a Malian professional footballer who plays for K League 2 club Cheonan City FC. He was part of the youth team that made it to the group stage at the 2013 FIFA U-20 World Cup with the Mali squad.
