= Jonathan Castillo (footballer, born 2001) =

Venezuelan footballer (born 2001)

Personal information
- Full name: Jonathan Fernando Castillo Aguirre
- Date of birth: 7 January 2001 (age 25)
- Place of birth: Palo Verde, Venezuela
- Height: 1.79 m (5 ft 10 in)
- Position: Winger

Team information
- Current team: Angostura
- Number: 90

Youth career
- Metropolitanos

Senior career*
Years	Team	Apps	(Gls)
2017–2022	Metropolitanos	45	(3)
2023	Marítimo		
2024–	Angostura	1	(0)
- * Club domestic league appearances and goals as of 20:45, 1 September 2024 (UTC)

Jonathan Fernando Castillo Aguirre (born 7 January 2001) is a Venezuelan footballer who plays as a winger for Angostura.

== Club career ==
=== Metropolitanos ===
Born in Palo Verde, Castillo is a product of Metropolitanos. Ahead of the 2017 season, 16-year old Castillo was promoted to the first team squad. On 7 July 2017, Castillo signed his first professional contract with Metropolitanos. He got his official debut for the club in a Venezuelan Primera División game against Atlético Venezuela on 16 July 2017. Castillo made a total of two appearances in the 2017 season.

In February 2018, Castillo scored his first goal in the Venezuelan Primera División in a game against Mineros de Guayana. He made six appearances throughout the season. After a 2019 season with one goal in 13 games, Castillo signed a new contract until the end of 2021 in October 2019. In the following two season - 2020 and 2021 - Castille made a total of 22 appearances and scored one goal.

In the beginning of January 2023, Castillo was released by Metropolitanos.

=== Marítimo ===
In 2023, Castillo played for Venezuelan Segunda División side Marítimo.
