= Hidetoshi Miyuki =

Japanese footballer

Hidetoshi Miyuki 三幸 秀稔
Personal information
- Full name: Hidetoshi Miyuki
- Date of birth: May 23, 1993 (age 33)
- Place of birth: Ichikawa, Chiba, Japan
- Height: 1.72 m (5 ft 7 1/2 in)
- Position: Midfielder

Team information
- Current team: Chungbuk Cheongju
- Number: 41

Youth career
- 2006–2011: JFA Academy

Senior career*
Years	Team	Apps	(Gls)
2012–2013	Ventforet Kofu	6	(0)
2014	SC Sagamihara	28	(1)
2016–2019	Renofa Yamaguchi	140	(6)
2020–2021	Shonan Bellmare	18	(0)
2022–2023	Omiya Ardija	16	(0)
2024–	Chungbuk Cheongju	3	(0)
- * Club domestic league appearances and goals as of 28 June 2022

Hidetoshi Miyuki (三幸 秀稔, Miyuki Hidetoshi; born May 23, 1993) is a Japanese professional footballer who plays as a midfielder for K League 2 club Chungbuk Cheongju.

== Club statistics ==
Updated to end of 2018 season.

Appearances and goals by club, season and competition
Club	Season	League			Emperor's Cup		J. League Cup		Total	
Club	Season	Division	Apps	Goals	Apps	Goals	Apps	Goals	Apps	Goals
Ventforet Kofu	2012	J2 League	5	0	1	0	–		6	0
Ventforet Kofu	2013	J1 League	1	0	4	1	0	0	5	1
Ventforet Kofu	Total		6	0	5	1	0	0	11	1
SC Sagamihara	2014	J3 League	28	1	–		–		28	1
Renofa Yamaguchi	2016	J2 League	36	3	3	1	–		39	4
Renofa Yamaguchi	2017	J2 League	21	1	1	0	–		22	1
Renofa Yamaguchi	2018	J2 League	41	2	2	0	–		43	2
Renofa Yamaguchi	Total		98	6	6	1	0	0	104	7
Career total			132	7	11	2	0	0	143	9
