= Yuhei Sato (footballer) =

Japanese footballer

Yuhei Sato 佐藤優平
Personal information
- Full name: Yuhei Sato
- Date of birth: 29 October 1990 (age 36)
- Place of birth: Tsuzuki-ku, Yokohama, Japan
- Height: 1.72 m (5 ft 8 in)
- Position: Midfielder

Team information
- Current team: Jeonnam Dragons
- Number: 15

Youth career
- 2000–2008: Yokohama F. Marinos Youth
- 2009–2012: Kokushikan University

Senior career*
Years	Team	Apps	(Gls)
2013–2015	Yokohama F. Marinos	28	(1)
2015	→ Albirex Niigata (loan)	10	(0)
2016–2017	Montedio Yamagata	43	(2)
2018–2021	Tokyo Verdy	135	(16)
2022–2026	Jeonnam Dragons	77	(2)
Medal record
Yokohama F. Marinos
Runner-up	J1 League	2013
Winner	Emperor's Cup	2013
- * Club domestic league appearances and goals as of 23 December 2022

Yuhei Sato (佐藤 優平, born 29 October 1990) is a Japanese footballer who plays as a midfielder for Jeonnam Dragons in K League 2.

== Career ==
=== Yokohama F. Marinos ===
Sato officially made his debut for Yokohama F. Marinos in the J. League Division 1 on 9 March 2013 against Shimizu S-Pulse in which he came on as a 90th minute stoppage time substitute from Shunsuke Nakamura as Yokohama won the match 5–0.

In 2022, Sato joined Jeonnam Dragons of K League 2.

== Career statistics ==
Updated to end of 2018 season.

Appearances and goals by club, season and competition
Club	Season	League		Emperor's Cup		J. League Cup		AFC		Total	
Club	Season	Apps	Goals	Apps	Goals	Apps	Goals	Apps	Goals	Apps	Goals
Yokohama F. Marinos	2013	11	0	5	1	5	1	–		21	2
Yokohama F. Marinos	2014	16	1	1	0	0	0	3	0	20	1
Yokohama F. Marinos	2015	1	0	–		5	0	–		6	0
Albirex Niigata	2015	10	0	2	0	–		–		12	0
Montedio Yamagata	2016	23	1	1	0	–		–		24	1
Montedio Yamagata	2017	20	1	1	0	–		–		21	1
Tokyo Verdy	2018	24	6	0	0	–		–		24	6
Career total		105	9	10	1	10	1	3	0	128	11

== Honours ==
Yokohama F. Marinos

- Emperor's Cup: 2013
