= Jonathan Castillo (footballer, born 1993) =

Argentine footballer

Personal information
- Full name: Jonathan Emanuel Castillo
- Date of birth: 5 January 1993 (age 33)
- Place of birth: Florencio Varela, Argentina
- Height: 1.73 m (5 ft 8 in)
- Position: Defender

Youth career
- Boca Juniors

Senior career*
Years	Team	Apps	(Gls)
2010	Quilmes	4	(0)
	Boca Juniors	0	(0)
2014	Sportivo Italiano	7	(0)
2016	Chungju Hummel	1	(0)
2016-2017	Luján	30	(0)
2017-2018	Deportivo Armenio	26	(1)
- Siracusa
- * Club domestic league appearances and goals

Jonathan Emanuel Castillo (born 5 January 1993) is an Argentine footballer who plays as a defender for Siracusa.

== Career ==
In 2014, Castillo signed for Sportivo Italiano in the Argentine third division after playing for Boca Juniors, Argentina's most successful club.

In 2016, he signed for Argentine fourth division side Luján from Chungju Hummel in the South Korean second division.

In 2017, he signed for Argentine fourth division team Deportivo Armenio before joining Siracusa in the Italian fifth division.
