= Juninho Rocha =

Brazilian footballer

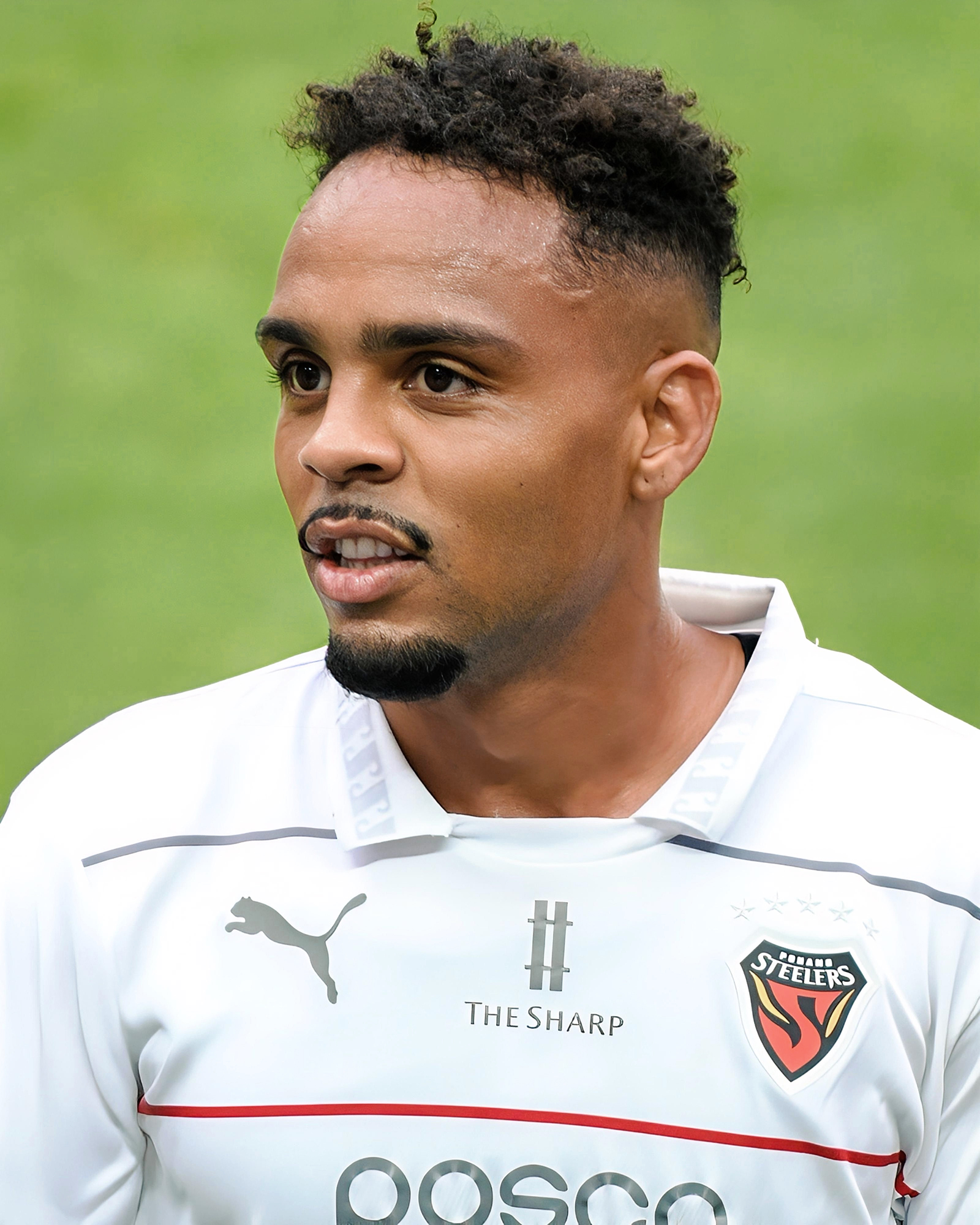
- Rocha in 2025

Personal information
- Full name: Paulo Afonso da Rocha Junior
- Date of birth: 5 November 1997 (age 28)
- Place of birth: Rio de Janeiro, Brazil
- Height: 1.70 m (5 ft 7 in)
- Position: Forward

Team information
- Current team: Pohang Steelers
- Number: 11

Senior career*
Years	Team	Apps	(Gls)
2017	Huracán	24	(3)
2018	Montevideo Wanderers	7	(0)
2018–2019	Cafetaleros de Tapachula	13	(1)
2020	Brasil de Pelotas	4	(0)
2020	Central Español	19	(7)
2021–2022	Rentistas	28	(3)
2023	Gimpo FC	30	(3)
2024	Chungnam Asan	36	(12)
2025–	Pohang Steelers	42	(4)
- * Club domestic league appearances and goals as of 3 August 2026

Paulo Afonso da Rocha Junior (born 5 November 1997) is a Brazilian footballer also known as Juninho who plays as a forward for Pohang Steelers.
