= Kainã (footballer) =

Brazilian footballer

Personal information
- Full name: Kainã Nunes da Silva Amarante
- Date of birth: 31 May 1997 (age 29)
- Place of birth: Porto Alegre, Brazil
- Height: 1.96 m (6 ft 5 in)
- Position: Forward

Team information
- Current team: Phrae United
- Number: 9

Youth career
- Santo André
- União da Madeira

Senior career*
| Years | Team | Apps | (Gls) |
| 2017–2018 | Felgueiras 1932 | 3 | (0) |
| 2018–2019 | Olhanense | 1 | (0) |
| 2019 | Moura | 16 | (1) |
| 2019–2020 | Marco | | |
| 2020–2021 | Besa | 15 | (7) |
| 2021–2023 | Vllaznia | 34 | (5) |
| 2022 | → Kastrioti (loan) | 20 | (7) |
| 2023–2024 | Tirana | 16 | (4) |
| 2024 | Chungnam Asan | 5 | (0) |
| 2024–2025 | Esteghlal Khuzestan | 22 | (2) |
| 2025–2026 | Bac Ninh | 11 | (3) |
| 2026– | Phrae United | 0 | (0) |
- * Club domestic league appearances and goals as of 8 June 2026

Kainã Nunes da Silva Amarante (born 31 May 1997), known simply as Kainã, is a Brazilian professional footballer who plays as a forward for Thai League 2 club Phrae United.

== Club career ==
On 19 August 2025, Kainã signed for Vietnamese club Bac Ninh in the V.League 2.
