= Rodrigo Bassani =

Brazilian footballer

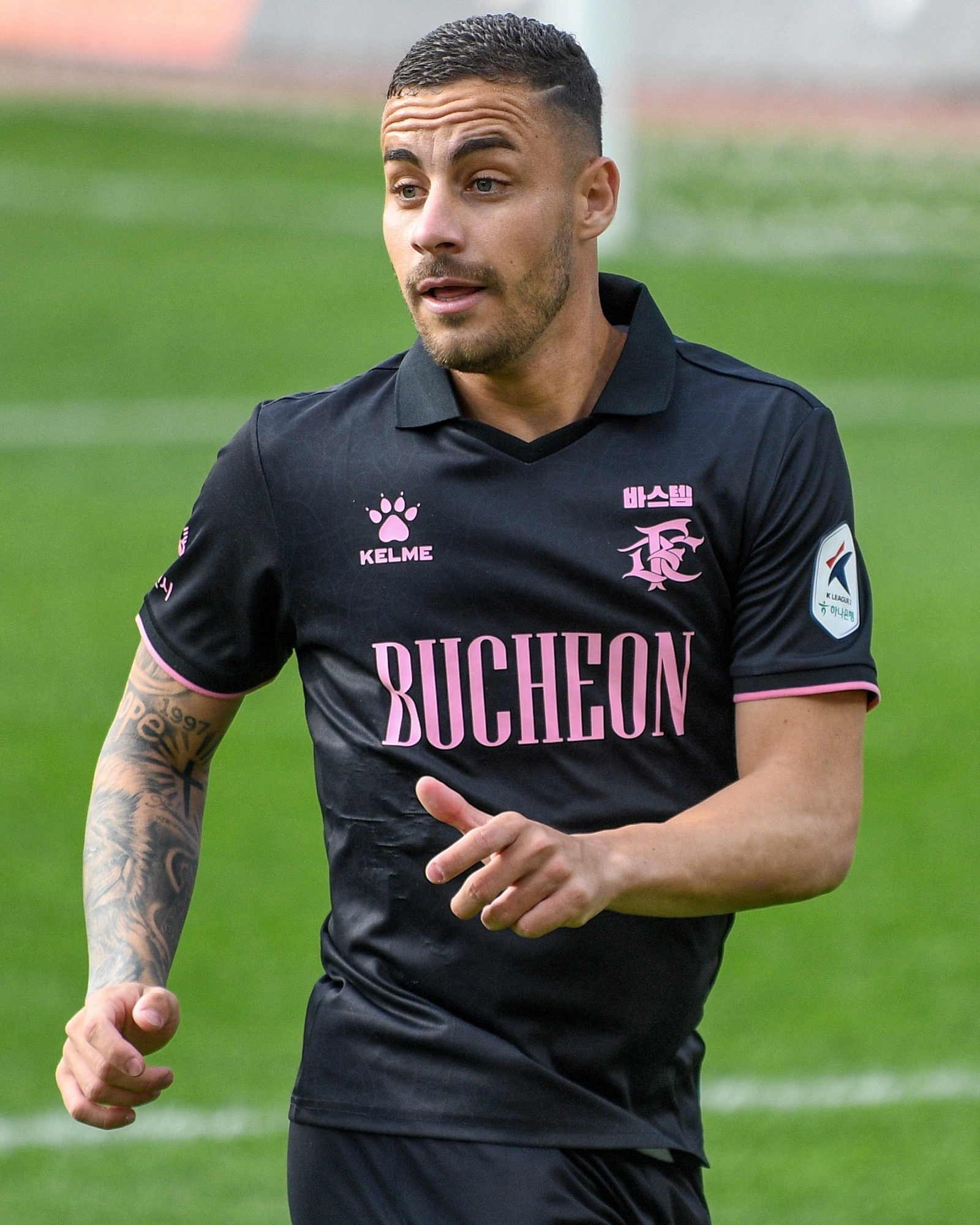
- Bassani in 2024

Personal information
- Full name: Rodrigo Bassani da Cruz
- Date of birth: 17 October 1997 (age 29)
- Place of birth: São José do Rio Preto, Brazil
- Height: 1.77 m (5 ft 10 in)
- Position: Midfielder

Team information
- Current team: Bucheon FC 1995
- Number: 10

Senior career*
Years	Team	Apps	(Gls)
2015–2019	Ituano	62	(10)
2018	→ Guarani-SC (loan)	17	(6)
2019	Roeselare	13	(3)
2020	Zacatepec	2	(1)
2020	Atlético Morelia	0	(0)
2020–2021	União Suzano	0	(0)
2021	→ Maringá (loan)	13	(7)
2021	→ Figueirense (loan)	12	(4)
2022	Juventude	6	(0)
2022	→ Figueirense (loan)	21	(2)
2023	Suwon Samsung Bluewings	23	(3)
2024–	Bucheon FC 1995	84	(25)
- * Club domestic league appearances and goals as of 4 August 2026

Rodrigo Bassani da Cruz (born 17 October 1997) is a Brazilian footballer who currently plays as a midfielder for K League 1 club Bucheon FC 1995.

== Career statistics ==
=== Club ===
As of 13 October 2019.

Club	Season	League			State League		Cup		Other		Total	
Club	Season	Division	Apps	Goals	Apps	Goals	Apps	Goals	Apps	Goals	Apps	Goals
Ituano	2015	–			0	0	3 (Note: Appearances in the Copa do Brasil)	0	12 (Note: Appearances in the Copa Paulista)	2	15	2
Ituano	2016	Série D	7	1	0	0	0	0	5	1	12	2
Ituano	2017	Série D	6	0	10 (Note: Appearances in the Campeonato Paulista)	0	0	0	0	0	16	0
Ituano	2018	–			4	0	0	0	16	6	20	6
Ituano	2019	Série D	7	0	10	0	0	0	0	0	17	0
Ituano	Total		20	1	24	0	3	0	33	9	80	10
Guarani-SC (loan)	2018	–			17 (Note: Appearances in the Campeonato Catarinense Divisão Especial)	6	0	0	0	0	17	6
Roeselare	2019–20	Proximus League	5	0	–		0	0	0	0	5	0
Career total			25	1	41	6	3	0	33	9	102	16
