= Luis Mina =

Colombian footballer (born 1993)

Personal information
- Full name: Luis Fabián Mina Zapata
- Date of birth: 10 August 1993 (age 33)
- Place of birth: Colombia
- Height: 1.80 m (5 ft 11 in)
- Position: Striker

Team information
- Current team: Gimpo FC
- Number: 24

Senior career*
Years	Team	Apps	(Gls)
–2020	Boca Juniors de Cali	89	(24)
2021–2022	Deportes Quindío	48	(13)
2022	CSD Macará	14	(7)
2023–	Gimpo FC	120	(54)
- * Club domestic league appearances and goals as of 6 August 2026

Luis Fabián Mina Zapata (born 10 August 1993) is a Colombian footballer who plays as a striker for Gimpo FC.

== Career ==
Mina started his career with Colombian side Boca Juniors de Cali. In 2021, he signed for Colombian side Deportes Quindío. In 2022, he signed for Ecuadorian side CSD Macará. In 2023, he signed for South Korean side Gimpo FC. He was the top scorer of the 2023 K League 2 with seventeen goals. He was described as "somewhat slow [at the start of the 2024 season]... scored three goals, but was unable to play for a while due to an injury".

== Style of play ==
Mina mainly operates as a striker. He is known for his speed.

== Personal life ==
Mina was born in 1993 in Colombia. He is the uncle of Colombia international Davinson Sánchez.
