= Kazuki Takahashi (footballer, born 1996) =

Japanese footballer

Kazuki Takahashi 高橋 一輝
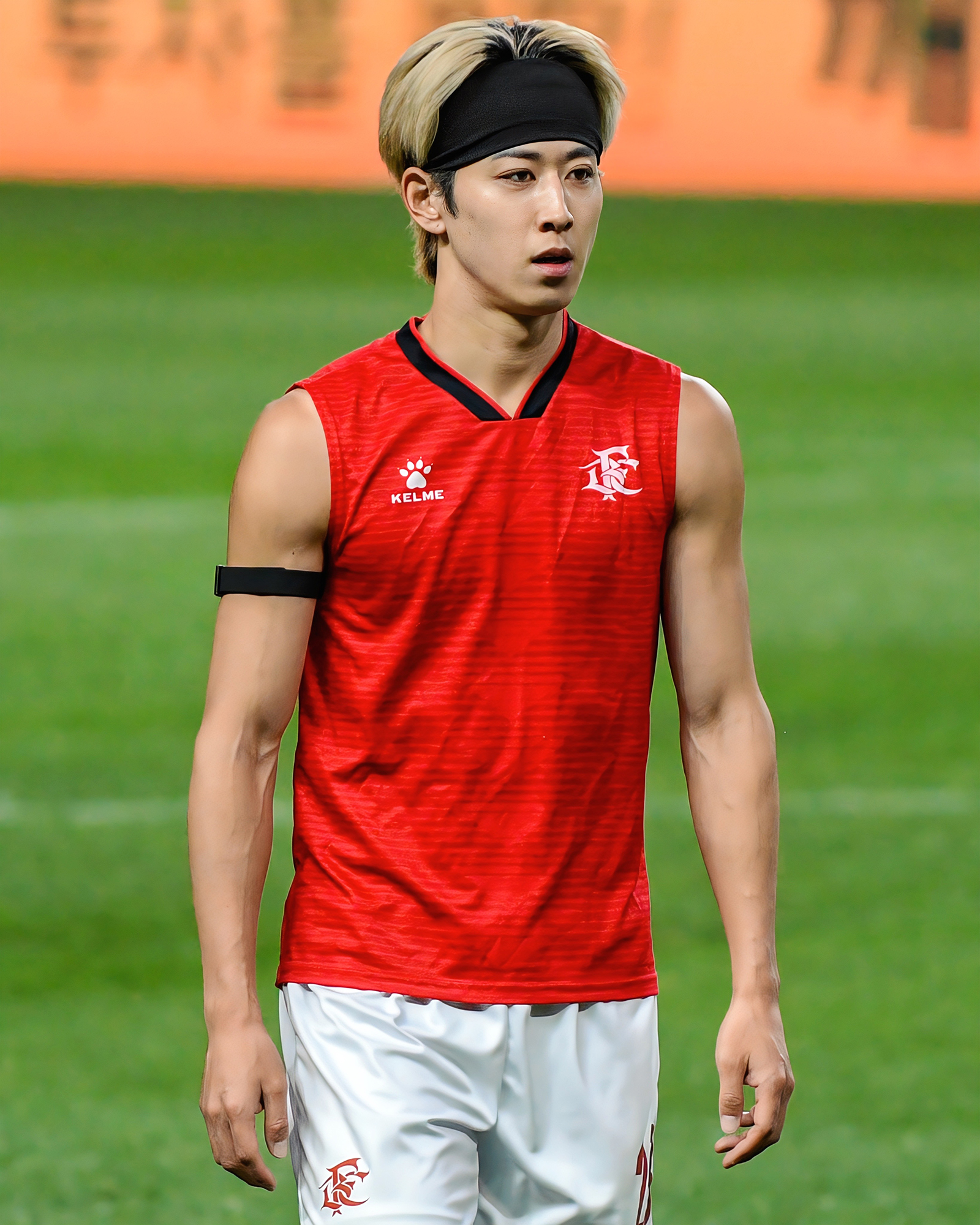
- Takahashi in 2026

Personal information
- Date of birth: 6 October 1996 (age 30)
- Place of birth: Noda, Japan
- Height: 1.77 m (5 ft 10 in)
- Position: Midfielder

Team information
- Current team: Bucheon FC 1995
- Number: 23

Senior career*
Years	Team	Apps	(Gls)
2017	Igalo		
2018	Jaro	25	(0)
2019	FC U Craiova		
2019–2020	Pandurii	16	(0)
2020–2021	AFC Eskilstuna	32	(0)
2022	Pirin Blagoevgrad	18	(0)
2023–	Bucheon FC 1995	121	(2)
- * Club domestic league appearances and goals as of 4 August 2026

Kazuki Takahashi (高橋 一輝, Takahashi Kazuki; born 6 October 1996) is a Japanese footballer who plays as a midfielder for K League 1 club, Bucheon FC.

== Career ==
Before the second half of 2016–17, Takahashi signed for Montenegrin second tier side Igalo. Before the 2018 season, he signed for Jaro in the Finnish second tier. Before the second half of 2018–19, he signed for Romanian third tier club FC U Craiova.

In 2019, Takahashi signed for Pandurii in the Romanian second tier. In 2020, he signed for Swedish team AFC Eskilstuna. In January 2022, before the second half of the 2021–22 season, he signed a one-and-a-half-year contract with Pirin Blagoevgrad in Bulgaria. On 3 April 2022, Takahashi debuted for Pirin in a 0–3 loss to Levski Sofia.

In 2023, Takahashi joined to K League 2 club, Bucheon FC.
