= K League 2 =

Association football league in South Korea

- Organising body: K League Federation
- Founded: 2013; 13 years ago
- Country: South Korea
- Confederation: AFC
- Number of clubs: 17
- Level on pyramid: 2
- Promotion to: K League 1
- Relegation to: K3 League
- Domestic cup: Korea Cup
- Current champions: Suwon Samsung Bluewings (2026)
- Most championships: Gwangju FC; Sangju Sangmu; Gimcheon Sangmu (2 titles each)
- Broadcasters: Sky Sports (South Korea); Life & Sports TV
- Website: kleague.com
- Current: 2026 K League 2

The K League 2 (Korean: K리그2) is the men's second-highest division of the South Korean football league system. Established in 2013 as K League Challenge, it is contested by 17 professional clubs.

== History ==
In 2011, the original K League announced a plan to begin a promotion and relegation system between the K League and a proposed second division. The K League then took steps to create the new second division, mainly with the addition of a split-system during the 2012 K-League season in which the bottom clubs were placed in a competition for safety with the last-placed club being relegated to the new second division (originally two clubs were going to be relegated but the withdrawal of Sangju Sangmu meant only one would be relegated).

The second division was going to get the name of K League, and the original K League's name was changed to K League Classic along with the new logo. However, the change caused some degree of confusion and controversy, and on 11 March 2013 the official name was changed to K League Challenge. On 22 January 2018, its name was once again changed to K League 2.

In the 2014 season, two additional teams were relegated from the K League Classic, reducing the number of participating teams to ten. Furthermore, the promotion-relegation playoff system was expanded. The league champion earned automatic promotion, while the third and fourth-placed teams competed in a playoff. The winner of this match faced the second-placed team, and the victor of this fixture advanced to the promotion-relegation playoff against the 11th-placed team from the K League Classic.

In mid-2016, the city of Ansan announced the formation of a new professional football club, Ansan Greeners FC. The club's foundation involved acquiring the squad of Ulsan Hyundai Mipo Dockyard Dolphins, a team with seven National League titles, and entering the league from the 2017 season. As a result of this development, Ansan Mugunghwa, which had previously represented Ansan, was dissolved at the conclusion of the 2016 season. Meanwhile, the police football team, which had served as the foundation for Ansan Mugunghwa, reached an agreement with the city of Asan to relocate and rebrand as Asan Mugunghwa.

== Competition format ==
=== Regular season ===
The regular season consists of 34 rounds. Each team plays a total of 32 matches, playing every other team two times (home and away). As there is an odd number of teams in the league, one team rests each round. Teams receive three points for a win and one point for a draw. No points are awarded for a loss. Teams are ranked by total points. If teams are level on points, tie-breakers are applied in the following order:

1. Total goals scored
2. Goal difference
3. Total wins
4. Head-to-head results
5. Penalty points accrued

The champions and runners-up of K League 2 automatically qualify for K League 1.

=== Play-offs ===
From the 2026 season onwards, the third, fourth, fifth and sixth-placed teams compete in the promotion play-offs. The winner of the K League 2 promotion play-off gain promotion to K League 1, while the promotion play-off runners-up plays against the twelfth-placed team in K League 1 in the K League promotion-relegation play-offs.

=== Relegation ===
In the 2026 season, a promotion and relegation system was introduced between K League 2 and K3 League.

== Current clubs ==
Club	Location	Stadium	First season	Current spell	Seasons (Note: As of the start of the 2026 season.)
Ansan Greeners	Ansan	Ansan Wa~ Stadium	2017	2017–	10
Busan IPark	Busan	Busan Gudeok Stadium	2016	2021–	10
Cheonan City	Cheonan	Cheonan Stadium	2023	2023–	4
Chungbuk Cheongju	Cheongju	Cheongju Sports Complex Stadium	2023	2023–	4
Chungnam Asan	Asan	Yi Sun-sin Stadium	2020	2020–	7
Daegu FC	Daegu	Daegu iM Bank Park	2014	2026–	4
Gimhae FC 2008	Gimhae	Gimhae Sports Complex	2026	2026–	1
Gimpo FC	Gimpo	Gimpo Solteo Football Stadium	2022	2022–	5
Gyeongnam FC	Changwon	Changwon Football Center	2015	2020–	10
Hwaseong FC	Hwaseong	Hwaseong Stadium	2025	2025–	2
Jeonnam Dragons	South Jeolla	Gwangyang Football Stadium	2019	2019–	8
Paju Frontier	Paju	Paju Stadium	2026	2026–	1
Seongnam FC	Seongnam	Tancheon Stadium	2017	2023–	6
Seoul E-Land	Seoul	Mokdong Stadium	2015	2015–	12
Suwon FC	Suwon	Suwon Stadium	2013	2026–	8
Suwon Samsung Bluewings	Suwon	Suwon World Cup Stadium	2024	2024–	3
Yongin FC	Yongin	Yongin Mireu Stadium	2026	2026–	1

Locations of the 2026 K League 2 teams in the Seoul metropolitan area
Location of the 2026 K League 2 teams

== Champions ==
=== Champions by season ===
Season	Champions	Runners-up
2013	Sangju Sangmu	Korean Police
2014	Daejeon Citizen	Gwangju FC
2015	Sangju Sangmu	Suwon FC
2016	Ansan Mugunghwa	Daegu FC
2017	Gyeongnam FC	Busan IPark
2018	Asan Mugunghwa	Seongnam FC
2019	Gwangju FC	Busan IPark
2020	Jeju United	Suwon FC
2021	Gimcheon Sangmu	Daejeon Hana Citizen
2022	Gwangju FC	Daejeon Hana Citizen
2023	Gimcheon Sangmu	Busan IPark
2024	FC Anyang	Chungnam Asan
2025	Incheon United	Suwon Samsung Bluewings
2026	Suwon Samsung Bluewings	Suwon FC

=== Performance by club ===
Club	Champions	Runners-up	Seasons won	Seasons runner-up
Gwangju FC	2	1	2019, 2022	2014
Sangju Sangmu	2	0	2013, 2015	—
Gimcheon Sangmu	2	0	2021, 2023	—
Daejeon Hana Citizen	1	2	2014	2021, 2022
Ansan Mugunghwa (Note: Ansan Mugunghwa and Asan Mugunghwa are officially two distinct clubs per K League policies.)	1	1	2016	2013
Suwon Samsung Bluewings	1	1	2026	2025
Gyeongnam FC	1	0	2017	—
Asan Mugunghwa	1	0	2018	—
Jeju SK	1	0	2020	—
FC Anyang	1	0	2024	—
Incheon United	1	0	2025	—
Suwon FC	0	3	—	2015, 2020, 2026
Busan IPark	0	3	—	2017, 2019, 2023
Daegu FC	0	1	—	2016
Seongnam FC	0	1	—	2018
Chungnam Asan	0	1	—	2024

== See also ==
- List of foreign K League 2 players
