= 2024 Jeonbuk Hyundai Motors season =

Jeonbuk Hyundai Motors
2024 season
- Manager: Kim Do-heon (from 27 May 2024)
- Stadium: Jeonju World Cup Stadium; Jeonju, Jeonbuk
- K League 1: 10th
- Korean FA Cup: Round of 16
- AFC Champions League: Quarter-finals
- Top goalscorer: League: Tiago Orobó (8); All: Tiago Orobó (10)
Home colours	Away colours	Third colours
- All statistics correct as of 11 November 2024.

The 2024 Jeonbuk Hyundai Motors season is their 31st season in existence, and the 30th consecutive season in the K League 1. In addition to the league, the club will compete in the 2024 Korean FA Cup and in the 2024–25 AFC Champions League Two.

== Players ==
No.	Name	Nationality	Date of birth (age)	Previous club	Contract since	Contract end
Goalkeepers
1	Kim Jeong-hoon	(South Korea)	20 April 2001 (age 25)	(South Korea) Gimcheon Sangmu FC	2017	2026
31	Gong Si-hyeon	(South Korea)	23 February 2005 (age 21)	Youth Team	2021	2026
38	Kim Tae-yang	(South Korea)	4 May 2001 (age 25)	(South Korea) Incheon University	2023	2024
55	Hwang Jae-yun	(South Korea)	18 March 2003 (age 23)	(South Korea) Incheon University	2024	
71	Kim Jun-hong	(South Korea)	3 June 2003 (age 23)	(South Korea) Gimcheon Sangmu FC	2021	2026
Defenders
5	Jang Min-jun	(South Korea)	11 July 2002 (age 24)	(South Korea) Sangji University	2024	2024
6	Lee Soo-bin	(South Korea)	7 May 2000 (age 26)	(South Korea) Pohang Steelers	2022	
14	Lee Jae-ik	(South Korea)	21 May 1999 (age 27)	(South Korea) Seoul E-Land FC	2024	
15	Ku Ja-ryong	(South Korea)	6 April 1992 (age 34)	(South Korea) Suwon Samsung Bluewings	2019	
17	Ahn Hyeon-beom	(South Korea)	21 December 1994 (age 31)	(South Korea) Jeju United	2023	2026
21	Park Chang-woo	(South Korea)	1 March 2003 (age 23)	Youth Team	2022	2024
22	Jeong Woo-jae	(South Korea)	28 June 1992 (age 34)	(South Korea) Jeju United	2023	
23	Kim Jin-su	(South Korea)	13 June 1992 (age 34)	(Saudi Arabia) Al Nassr FC	2021	2026
25	Choi Chul-soon	(South Korea)	8 February 1987 (age 39)	(South Korea) Gimcheon Sangmu FC	2006	2025
26	Hong Jeong-ho	(South Korea)	12 August 1989 (age 37)	(China) Jiangsu F.C.	2018	
39	Kim Tae-hwan	(South Korea)	24 July 1989 (age 37)	(South Korea) Ulsan HD FC	2024	2025
40	Lee Woo-yeon	(South Korea)	22 January 2003 (age 23)	Youth Team	2024	
50	Ji Si-woo	(South Korea)	5 August 2002 (age 24)	(South Korea) Yonsei University	2024	2024
66	Kim Tae-Hyun	(South Korea)	19 December 1996 (age 29)	(South Korea) Jeonnam Dragons	2024	
70	Park Si-hwa	(South Korea)	13 April 2004 (age 22)	(South Korea) Dankook University	2024	2024
94	Yeon Je-un	(South Korea)	28 August 1994 (age 32)	(South Korea) Jeju United	2024	
Midfielders
4	Park Jin-seop (C)	(South Korea)	23 October 1995 (age 30)	(South Korea) Daejeon Hana Citizen	2023	2024
8	Lee Yeong-jae	(South Korea)	13 September 1994 (age 32)	(South Korea) Gimcheon Sangmu FC	2024	
19	Nana Boateng	(Ghana)	10 May 1994 (age 32)	(Romania) CFR Cluj	2023	
24	Ma Ji-kang	(South Korea)	10 February 2003 (age 23)	(South Korea) Gimhae FC	2024	2024
30	Andrigo	(Brazil)	27 February 1995 (age 31)	(China) Chengdu Rongcheng	2024	2025
33	Jeon Byung-kwan	(South Korea)	10 November 2002 (age 23)	(South Korea) Daejeon Hana Citizen	2024	2026
34	Eom Seung-min	(South Korea)	2 May 2003 (age 23)	(South Korea) FC Mokpo	2024	
35	Kang Yeong-seok	(South Korea)	5 May 2002 (age 24)	(South Korea) Yong In University	2022	
36	Jang Nam-ung	(South Korea)	9 February 2004 (age 22)	(South Korea) Sangji University	2024	
37	Park Jun-beom	(South Korea)	5 April 2001 (age 25)	(South Korea) Yonsei University	2022	
44	Kim Ha-jun	(South Korea)	17 July 2002 (age 24)	(South Korea) FC Anyang	2024	
47	Park Chae-joon	(South Korea)	26 May 2003 (age 23)	Youth Team	2019	
77	Kwon Chang-hoon	(South Korea)	30 June 1994 (age 32)	(South Korea) Suwon Samsung Bluewings	2024	
81	Yu Je-ho	(South Korea)	15 August 2000 (age 26)	(South Korea) Suwon Samsung Bluewings	2024	2026
88	Park Kyu-min	(South Korea)	8 June 2001 (age 25)	(South Korea) Gwangju University	2022	
91	Han Kook-young	(South Korea)	19 April 1990 (age 36)	(South Korea) Gangwon FC	2024	
97	Kim Jin-gyu	(South Korea)	24 February 1997 (age 29)	(South Korea) Gimcheon Sangmu FC	2022	
99	Kim Chang-hoon	(South Korea)	23 October 2004 (age 21)	Youth Team	2023	
Forwards
9	Tiago Orobó	(Brazil)	28 October 1993 (age 32)	(South Korea) Daejeon Hana Citizen	2024	
10	Song Min-kyu	(South Korea)	12 September 1999 (age 27)	(South Korea) Pohang Steelers	2021	2025
11	Lee Seung-woo	(South Korea)	6 January 1998 (age 28)	(South Korea) Suwon FC	2024	2025
16	Park Jae-yong	(South Korea)	13 March 2000 (age 26)	(South Korea) FC Anyang	2023	
18	Jeon Jin-woo	(South Korea)	9 September 1999 (age 27)	(South Korea) Suwon Samsung Bluewings	2024	2026
27	Moon Seon-min	(South Korea)	9 June 1992 (age 34)	(South Korea) Gimcheon Sangmu FC	2019	2024
36	Jang Nam-ung	(South Korea)	9 February 2004 (age 22)	(South Korea) Sangji University	2024	2024
49	Sung Jin-young	(South Korea)	21 May 2003 (age 23)	(South Korea) Korea University	2024	2024
98	Hernandes Rodrigues	(Brazil)	2 September 1999 (age 27)	(South Korea) Incheon United FC	2024	
Players loaned out
3	Jeong Tae-wook	(South Korea)	16 May 1997 (age 29)	(South Korea) Daegu FC	2023	
7	Han Kyo-won	(South Korea)	15 June 1990 (age 36)	(South Korea) Hwaseong FC	2014	
16	Lee You-hyeon	(South Korea)	8 February 1997 (age 29)	(South Korea) Gimcheon Sangmu FC	2021	
18	Lee Jun-ho	(South Korea)	28 September 2002 (age 24)	(South Korea) Jeonnam Dragons	2023	2024
29	Lee Ji-hoon	(South Korea)	2 March 2002 (age 24)	(South Korea) Gimcheon Sangmu FC	2024	2024
30	Oh Jae-hyeok	(South Korea)	21 June 2002 (age 24)	(South Korea) Bucheon FC 1995	2023	
30	Lee Gyu-dong (F)	(South Korea)	24 January 2004 (age 22)	Youth Team	2023	2024
34	Kang Sang-yoon	(South Korea)	31 May 2004 (age 22)	(South Korea) Busan IPark	2022	
96	Park Ju-yeong (M)	(South Korea)	23 April 2002 (age 24)	(South Korea) Kyunghee University	2024	2024
Players enlisted
11	Lee Dong-jun	(South Korea)	1 February 1997 (age 29)	(Germany) Hertha BSC	2023	
28	Maeng Seong-ung	(South Korea)	4 February 1998 (age 28)	(South Korea) FC Anyang	2022	
Players who left during mid-season
2	Tomáš Petrášek	(Czech Republic)	2 March 1992 (age 34)	(Poland) Raków Częstochowa	2023	2025
13	Jeong Min-ki	(South Korea)	9 February 1996 (age 30)	(South Korea) FC Anyang	2023	2024
32	Kim Rae-woo	(South Korea)	12 March 2004 (age 22)	Youth Team	2019	
80	Marcus Vinícius	(Brazil)	19 February 1997 (age 29)	(Colombia) Atlético Huila	2024	2025

== Transfers ==
=== Pre-season ===
==== In ====
Transfer In

Position	Player	Transferred from	Ref
DF	(South Korea) Lee Jae-ik	(South Korea) Seoul E-Land FC	Free
DF	(South Korea) Kim Tae-hwan	(South Korea) Ulsan HD FC	Free
DF	(South Korea) Ji Si-woo	(South Korea) Yonsei University	Free
DF	(South Korea) Jang Min-jun	(South Korea) Sangji University	Free
DF	(South Korea) Park Si-hwa	(South Korea) Dankook University	Free
MF	(South Korea) Kwon Chang-hoon	(South Korea) Suwon Samsung Bluewings	Free
MF	(South Korea) Lee Yeong-jae	(South Korea) Suwon FC	US$0.6m
MF	(South Korea) Jeon Byung-kwan	(South Korea) Daejeon Hana Citizen	Free
MF	(South Korea) Park Ju-yeong	(South Korea) Kyunghee University	Free
MF	(Brazil) Marcus Vinícius	(Colombia) Atlético Huila	Free
FW	(Brazil) Tiago Orobó	(South Korea) Daejeon Hana Citizen	US$1.2m
FW	(Brazil) Hernandes Rodrigues	(South Korea) Incheon United FC	US$1.1m
FW	(South Korea) Hwang Jae-yun	(South Korea) Korea University	Free
FW	(South Korea) Sung Jin-young	(South Korea) Korea University	Free
FW	(South Korea) Jang Nam-ung	(South Korea) Sangji University	Free

Loan Return

Position	Player	Returned From	Ref
DF	(South Korea) Lee You-hyeon	(South Korea) Gimcheon Sangmu FC	End of Military Duty (Note: Lee You-hyeon returns from military duty before going on loan with Gangwon FC for the 24/25 season.)
DF	(South Korea) Lee Min-hyuk	(South Korea) Gyeongnam FC	End of loan
MF	(South Korea) Lee Ji-hoon	(South Korea) Gimcheon Sangmu FC	End of Military Duty
MF	(South Korea) Kang Sang-yoon	(South Korea) Busan IPark	End of loan (Note: Kang Sang-yoon returns on loan before moving to Suwon for the 24/25 season.)
FW	(South Korea) Eom Seung-min	(South Korea) FC Mokpo	End of loan

==== Out ====
Transfer Out

Position	Player	Transferred To	Ref
GK	(South Korea) Park Beom-soo	(South Korea)	Free
DF	(South Korea) Yu Ye-chan	(Japan) Ehime FC (J2)	Free
DF	(South Korea) Noh Yun-sang	(South Korea) Yangpyeong FC (K3)	Free
DF	(South Korea) Do Jae-gyeong	(South Korea)	Free
DF	(South Korea) Yun Young-sun	(South Korea) Seongnam FC (K2)	Free
MF	(South Korea) Lee Sung-yoon	(South Korea) Jeonnam Dragons (K2)	Free
MF	(South Korea) Ryu Jae-moon	(South Korea) FC Seoul	Free
MF	(South Korea) Park Jin-seong	(South Korea) Daejeon Hana Citizen	Free
MF	(South Korea) Paik Seung-ho	(England) Birmingham City F.C. (E2)	Free
MF	(Japan) Jun Amano	(Japan) Yokohama F. Marinos (J1)	End of loan
MF	(South Korea) Hong Jang-woo	(South Korea) Changwon City FC (K3)	Free
FW	(Brazil) André Luis	(Brazil) Cuiabá (B1)	Free
FW	(Brazil) Rafael Silva	(Brazil) Cruzeiro (B1)	Free
FW	(Brazil) Gustavo	(China) Shanghai Port (C1)	Free
FW	(South Korea) Yoon Do-won	(South Korea) Yangpyeong FC (K3)	Free

Loan Out

Position	Player	Loan Out	Ref
GK	(South Korea) Kim Jun-hong	(South Korea) Gimcheon Sangmu FC	Military Duty til July 2024
GK	(South Korea) Jeon Ji-wan	(Japan) FC Ryukyu (J2)	Season loan
DF	(South Korea) Lee You-hyeon	(South Korea) Gangwon FC	Season loan
MF	(South Korea) Oh Jae-hyeok	(South Korea) Seongnam FC (K2)	Season loan
MF	(South Korea) Kang Sang-yoon	(South Korea) Suwon FC	Season loan till December 2025
MF	(South Korea) Kim Jin-gyu	(South Korea) Gimcheon Sangmu FC	Military Duty
MF	(South Korea) Maeng Seong-ung	(South Korea) Gimcheon Sangmu FC	Military Duty
FW	(South Korea) Lee Dong-jun	(South Korea) Gimcheon Sangmu FC	Military Duty
FW	(South Korea) Lee Jun-ho	(South Korea) Busan IPark (K2)	Season loan

=== Mid-season ===
==== In ====
Transfer In

Position	Player	Transferred from	Ref
DF	(South Korea) Yeon Je-un	(South Korea) Jeju United	Undisclosed
MF	(Brazil) Andrigo	(China) Chengdu Rongcheng (C1)	Free
MF	(South Korea) Han Kook-young	(South Korea) Gangwon FC	Undisclosed
MF	(South Korea) Kim Ha-jun	(South Korea) FC Anyang (K2)	Undisclosed
MF	(South Korea) Yu Je-Ho	(South Korea) Suwon Samsung Bluewings (K2)	Undisclosed
FW	(South Korea) Jeon Jin-woo	(South Korea) Suwon Samsung Bluewings (K2)	Undisclosed
FW	(South Korea) Lee Seung-woo	(South Korea) Suwon FC	Undisclosed + Jeong Min-Ki

==== Loan In ====
Transfer In

Position	Player	Transferred from	Ref
DF	(South Korea) Kim Tae-Hyun	(South Korea) Jeonnam Dragons	Season loan

Loan Return

Position	Player	Loan Out	Ref
GK	(South Korea) Kim Jun-hong	(South Korea) Gimcheon Sangmu FC	End of Military Duty
MF	(South Korea) Kim Jin-gyu	(South Korea) Gimcheon Sangmu FC	End of Military Duty

==== Out ====
Transfer Out

Position	Player	Transferred Out	Ref
GK	(South Korea) Jeong Min-Ki	(South Korea) Suwon FC	Part of Lee Seung-woo deal
DF	(Czech Republic) Tomáš Petrášek	(Czech Republic) FC Hradec Králové	Free
MF	(South Korea) Kim Rae-woo	(South Korea)	Free
MF	(Brazil) Marcus Vinícius	(Colombia) Independiente Medellín	Free

Loan Out

Position	Player	Loan Out	Ref
DF	(South Korea) Jeong Tae-wook	(Australia) Western Sydney Wanderers	Season loan
MF	(South Korea) Lee Ji-hoon	(South Korea) Cheonan City FC (K2)	Season loan
MF	(South Korea) Park Ju-yeong	(South Korea) Jeju United	Season loan
FW	(South Korea) Han Kyo-won	(South Korea) Suwon FC	Season loan
FW	(South Korea) Lee Gyu-dong	(South Korea) Suwon Samsung Bluewings (K2)	Season loan

== Friendly matches ==
Win Draw Loss

=== Tour of UAE (10 Jan - 3 Feb) ===
21 January 2023 1	FC Pari NN (Russia)	1-1	(South Korea) Jeonbuk Hyundai Motors	Dubai, United Arab Emirates
	(??)		Lee Yeong-jae 69'	Stadium: Jebel Ali Football Stadium

24 January 2023 2	Zenit Saint Petersburg (Russia)	5-1	(South Korea) Jeonbuk Hyundai Motors	Abu Dhabi, United Arab Emirates
	Mateo Cassierra 22'; Pedro 58'; Ivan Sergeyev 66'; Gustavo Mantuan 70'; Bardachyov 74'		Lee Yeong-jae 26'

28 January 2023 3	Riga FC (Latvia)	2-0	(South Korea) Jeonbuk Hyundai Motors	Dubai, United Arab Emirates
	12'; 74'			Stadium: Jebel Ali Football Stadium

31 January 2023 4	Al Bataeh Club (United Arab Emirates)	cancelled	(South Korea) Jeonbuk Hyundai Motors	Dubai, United Arab Emirates
				Stadium: Jebel Ali Football Stadium

31 January 2023 4	FC AGMK (Uzbekistan)	0-1	(South Korea) Jeonbuk Hyundai Motors	Dubai, United Arab Emirates
			Lee Ji-hoon 55'	Stadium: Jebel Ali Football Stadium

2 February 2023 5	FC Urartu (Armenia)	1-3	(South Korea) Jeonbuk Hyundai Motors	Dubai, United Arab Emirates
				Stadium: Jebel Ali Football Stadium

== Competitions ==
=== Overall record ===
Results summary

Overall								Home						Away					
Pld	W	D	L	GF	GA	GD	Pts	W	D	L	GF	GA	GD	W	D	L	GF	GA	GD
0	0	0	0	0	0	0	0	0	0	0	0	0	0	0	0	0	0	0	0

Last updated: 3 December 2023.
Source: Soccerway

=== K League 1 ===
Pos	Team	Pld	W	D	L	GF	GA	GD	Pts	Qualification or relegation (Note: Teams played each other three times (33 matches), before the league was split into two groups, the top six and the bottom six.)
8	Daejeon Hana Citizen	38	12	12	14	43	47	−4	48	
9	Gwangju FC	38	14	5	19	42	49	−7	47	
10	Jeonbuk Hyundai Motors (O)	38	10	12	16	49	59	−10	42	Qualification for relegation play-offs
11	Daegu FC (O)	38	9	13	16	45	52	−7	40	Qualification for relegation play-offs
12	Incheon United (R)	38	9	12	17	38	49	−11	39	Relegation to K League 2

Source: Soccerway K League
Rules for classification: 1) Points; 2) Goals scored; 3) Goal difference; 4) Wins; 5) Head-to-head points
(O) Play-off winners; (R) Relegated

==== Matches ====
As usual, the league season will be played with 38 matches split in two stages. After 33 league matches between the 12 participating teams, the teams are split into the Final Round (Top 6 teams, which aims to won an AFC Champions spot) and Relegation Round (Bottom 6 teams, that aims to survive relegation).

1 March 2024 1	Jeonbuk Hyundai Motors	1-1	Daejeon Hana Citizen	Jeonju
16:30 UTC+9	Ahn Hyeon-beom 86'; Kim Tae-hwan (yellow card) 72'; Kim Jin-su (yellow card) 84'	Report	Vladislavs Gutkovskis 11'; Kang Yoon-sung (yellow card) 38'; Kim Hanseo (yellow card) 49'; Lee Hyeon-sik (yellow card) 71'; Kim In-gyun (yellow card) 74'	Stadium: Jeonju World Cup Stadium; Attendance: 24,758; Referee: Jeong Dong-sik

9 March 2024 2	Suwon FC	1-1	Jeonbuk Hyundai Motors	Suwon
14:00 UTC+9	Lee Seung-woo 47'	Report	Tiago Orobó 54'; Nana Boateng (red card) 30'	Stadium: Suwon Sports Complex; Attendance: 9,557; Referee: Chae Sang-hyeop

17 March 2024 3	Gimcheon Sangmu FC	1-0	Jeonbuk Hyundai Motors	Gimcheon
14:00 UTC+9	Kim Hyeon-Ug 25'; Won Du-jae (yellow card) 47'	Report		Stadium: Gimcheon Stadium; Attendance: 4,300; Referee: Kim Woo-sung

30 March 2024 4	Jeonbuk Hyundai Motors	2-2	Ulsan HD FC	Jeonju
14:00 UTC+9	Lee Dong-jun 45+2'; Moon Seon-min 70'; Tiago Orobó (penalty missed) 48; Lee Soo-bin (yellow card) 37'; Lee Dong-jun (yellow card) 61'	Report	Lee Dong-gyeong 22'; Kim Ji-hyeon 40'; Hwang Seok-ho (yellow card) 4'; Jo Hyeon-woo (yellow card) 68'	Stadium: Jeonju World Cup Stadium; Attendance: 25,782; Referee: Lee Dong-jun

3 April 2024 5	Jeju United	2-0	Jeonbuk Hyundai Motors	Seogwipo
19:30 UTC+9	Ye Hong-gyu 29'; Jin Seong-uk 90+8'; Reis Silva Morais (yellow card) 36'; Kim Jae-min (yellow card) 86'; Yuri (yellow card) 88'	Report	Lee Yeong-jae (yellow card) 64'; Kim Jin-su (red card) 80'	Stadium: Jeju World Cup Stadium; Attendance: 3,426; Referee: Kim Woo-sung

7 April 2024 6	Jeonbuk Hyundai Motors	2-3	Gangwon FC	Jeonju
14:00 UTC+9	Kim Tae-hwan 45+7' (pen.); Moon Seon-min 90+8'; Jeong Min-ki (yellow card) 40'; Jeon Byung-Kwan (yellow card) 54'; Koo Ja-Ryoung (yellow card) 86'	Report	Sang Heon Lee 42' (pen.), 74'; Marko Tući 70'; Lee Ki-hyuk (yellow card) 12'; Lee Gwang-yeon (yellow card) 47'	Stadium: Jeonju World Cup Stadium; Attendance: 11,215; Referee: Choi Hyun-jai

13 April 2024 7	Jeonbuk Hyundai Motors	2-1	Gwangju FC	Jeonju
14:00 UTC+9	Lee Jae-ik 18'; Song Min-kyu 90+1' (yellow card) 46'; Lee Soo-bin (yellow card) 18'; Marcus Viniciu (yellow card) 26'		Lee Kun-Hee 83'; Lee Heui-kyun (yellow card) 12'	Stadium: Jeonju World Cup Stadium; Attendance: 11,229; Referee: Chae Sang-hyeop

20 April 2024 8	FC Seoul	2-3	Jeonbuk Hyundai Motors	Seoul
16:30 UTC+9	Stanislav Iljutcenko 11'; Aleksandar Paločević 31'; Hwang Hyun-soo (yellow card) 36'; Cho Jun (yellow card) 70'	Report	Song Min-kyu 7' (yellow card) 32'; Lee Yeong-jae 40'; Jeon Byung-Kwan 49'; Jeong Min-ki (yellow card) 38'	Stadium: Seoul World Cup Stadium; Attendance: 28,048; Referee: Kim Hee-gon

28 April 2024 9	Jeonbuk Hyundai Motors	2-2	Daegu FC	Jeonju
14:00 UTC+9	Jeon Byung-kwan 10'; Hernandes Rodrigues 85'; Kim Jin-su (yellow card) 33'; Lee Soo-bin (yellow card) 52'; Kim Tae-hwan (yellow card) 73'	Report	Park Jae-hyeon 90+4'; Jeong Jae-Sang 90+6'; Hong Chul (yellow card) 40'; Kyohei Yoshino (yellow card) 73'	Stadium: Jeonju World Cup Stadium; Attendance: 13,642; Referee: Jeong Dong-sik

1 May 2024 10	Incheon United FC	3-0	Jeonbuk Hyundai Motors	Incheon
19:00 UTC+9	Harrison Delbridge 68'; Kim Do-hyuk 90+1' (yellow card) 90+1'; Stefan Mugoša 90+8' (yellow card) 83'; Kweon Han-jin (yellow card) 22'; Paik Seung-ho (yellow card) 52'; Kim Yeon-Soo (yellow card) 56'	Report	Lee Jae-ik (yellow card) 70' (yellow-red card) 89'; Nana Boateng (yellow card) 39'	Stadium: Incheon Football Stadium; Attendance: 10,094; Referee: Kim Woo-sung

4 May 2024 11	Pohang Steelers	1-0	Jeonbuk Hyundai Motors	Pohang
16:30 UTC+9	Kim Jong-woo 90+8'; Han Chan-hee (yellow card) 33'	Report		Stadium: Pohang Steel Yard; Attendance: 13,002; Referee: Kim Chong-hyuk

12 May 2024 12	Jeonbuk Hyundai Motors	2-3	Suwon FC	Jeonju
14:00 UTC+9	Moon Seon-min 25'; Bak Jae-yong 36' (pen.); Nana Boateng (red card) 43'; Lee Yeong-jae (yellow card) 27'; Jeon Byung-Kwan (yellow card) 45'; Lee Kyu-dong (yellow card) 76'	Report	Lee Seung-woo 57', 81'; Anderson 84'; Park Cheol-Woo (yellow card) 7'; Jose Pablo (yellow card) 15'	Stadium: Jeonju World Cup Stadium; Attendance: 13,009; Referee: Jeong Dong-sik

19 May 2024 13	Gwangju FC	0-3	Jeonbuk Hyundai Motors	Gwangju
14:00 UTC+9	Choi Kyoung-rok (yellow card) 15'	Report	Song Min-kyu 28' (pen.); Jeon Byung-kwan 31', 47'; Park Jae-yong (yellow card) 62'; Lee Yeong-jae (yellow card) 70'; Jeong Woo-jae (yellow card) 90+2'	Stadium: Gwangju Football Stadium; Attendance: 8,091; Referee: Kim Hee-gon

25 May 2024 14	Jeonbuk Hyundai Motors	0-0	Gimcheon Sangmu FC	Jeonju
14:00 UTC+9		Report		Stadium: Jeonju World Cup Stadium; Attendance: 11,726; Referee: Choi Hyun-jai

29 May 2024 15	Gangwon FC	2-1	Jeonbuk Hyundai Motors	Chuncheon
19:30 UTC+9	Yang Min-hyuk 4'; Yago Cariello 78'; Mun Ki Hwang (yellow card) 85'; Lee Ki-hyuk (yellow card) 90+4'	Report	Lee Yeong-jae 24'; Jeon Byung-kwan (yellow card) 53' (yellow-red card) 62'; Jeong Tae-uk (yellow card) 55'; Tiago (yellow card) 57'	Stadium: Chuncheon Songam Sports Town; Attendance: 6,125; Referee: Lee Dong-jun

1 June 2024 16	Ulsan HD FC	1-0	Jeonbuk Hyundai Motors	Ulsan
16:30 UTC+9	Ataru Esaka 90+4'; Jeong Tae-uk (yellow card) 55'	Report	Kang Yun-gu (yellow card) 43'	Stadium: Ulsan Munsu Football Stadium; Attendance: 29,007; Referee: Ko Hyung-jin

16 June 2024 17	Jeonbuk Hyundai Motors	2-2	Incheon United FC	Jeonju
18:00 UTC+9	Moon Seon-min 9', 70'; Song Min-kyu (yellow card) 52'	Report	Kim Do-hyuk 77'; Kim Seong-Min 90+1'; Sin Jin-ho (yellow card) 52'	Stadium: Jeonju World Cup Stadium; Attendance: 11,477; Referee: Chae Sang-hyeop

22 June 2024 18	Daegu FC	3-0	Jeonbuk Hyundai Motors	Daegu
18:00 UTC+9	Kyohei Yoshino 40' (yellow card) 85'; Cesinha 61' (pen.), 81'; Go Jae-hyeon (yellow card) 90+5'	Report	Lee Soo-bin (yellow card) 34'; Jeong Tae-uk (yellow card) 57'; Moon Seon-min (yellow card) 85'	Stadium: DGB Daegu Bank Park; Attendance: 10,540; Referee: Kim Woo-sung

26 June 2024 19	Jeonbuk Hyundai Motors	1-1	Pohang Steelers	Jeonju
19:30 UTC+9	Tiago Orobó 16' (yellow card) 77'	Report	Oberdan 20'; Lee Kyu-min (yellow card) 31'	Stadium: Jeonju World Cup Stadium; Attendance: 6,546; Referee: Lee Dong-jun

29 June 2024 20	Jeonbuk Hyundai Motors	1-5	FC Seoul	Jeonju
19:00 UTC+9	Tiago Orobó 67'; Kim Jin-su (red card) 59'; Kim Tae-hwan (yellow card) 49'; Han Kook-young (yellow card) 84'	Report	Kwon Wan-kyu 24'; Han Seung-gyu 45+2'; Lee Seung-mo 61'; Kang Seong-jin 89' (yellow card) 89'; Ronaldo Tavares 90+8'; Choi Jun (yellow card) 71'; Kang Sang-woo (yellow card) 72'; Baek Jong-bum (yellow card) 90+4'	Stadium: Jeonju World Cup Stadium; Attendance: 12,508; Referee: Shin Yong-jun

7 July 2024 21	Daejeon Hana Citizen	2-2	Jeonbuk Hyundai Motors	Daejeon
19:00 UTC+9	Cheon Seong-hoon 69' (pen.); Kim Jun-Bum 90+1'; Lee Jung-taek (yellow card) 45'; Lee Soon-min (yellow card) 47'	Report	Song Min-kyu 21'; Tiago Orobó 54'; Lee Soo-bin (yellow card) 7'; Lee Jae-ik (yellow card) 62'	Stadium: Daejeon World Cup Stadium; Attendance: 10,378; Referee: Choi Hyun-jae

10 July 2024 22	Jeonbuk Hyundai Motors	2-1	Jeju United	Jeonju
19:30 UTC+9	Jeon Byung-kwan 2'; Tiago Orobó 70'; Kim Tae-hwan (yellow card) 90+4'	Report	An Tae-hyun 1'; Jin Sung-wook (yellow card) 48'	Stadium: Jeonju World Cup Stadium; Attendance: 5,560; Referee: Chae Sang-hyeop

14 July 2024 23	Gimcheon Sangmu FC	4-0	Jeonbuk Hyundai Motors	Gimcheon
19:00 UTC+9	Lee Dong-gyeong 31' (pen.); Kim Dae-won 69'; Park Sang-Hyeok 90+3' (yellow card) 75'; Maeng Seong-ung 90+6'; Kim Min-duk (yellow card) 89'; Lee Jin-yong (yellow card) 90+3'	Report	Park Jin-seop (red card) 36'; Park Chang-woo (yellow card) 90+1'	Stadium: Gimcheon Stadium; Attendance: 3,524; Referee: Kim Chong-hyuk

20 July 2024 24	Jeonbuk Hyundai Motors	2-0	Ulsan HD FC	Jeonju
19:00 UTC+9	Tiago Orobó 79' (yellow card) 79'; Andrigo 90+9'; Lee Jae-ik (yellow card) 33'; Jeon Byung-Kwan (yellow card) 43'	Report	Kim Min-jun (yellow card) 82'	Stadium: Jeonju World Cup Stadium; Attendance: 18,573; Referee: Kim Dae-young

26 July 2024 25	Gangwon FC	4-2	Jeonbuk Hyundai Motors	Gangneung
19:30 UTC+9	Yang Min-hyuk 33'; Kim Gyeong-Min 55', 63'; Jin Jun-Seo 86'; Yu In-soo (yellow card) 47'; Marko Tući (yellow card) 81'	Report	Song Min-kyu 62' (yellow card) 81'; Kim Jin-gyu 71'; Lee Soo-bin (yellow card) 72'	Stadium: Gangneung Stadium; Attendance: 12,272; Referee: Ko Hyung-jin

9 August 2024 26	Jeonbuk Hyundai Motors	0-1	Gwangju FC	Jeonju
19:30 UTC+9	Park Jin-seob (yellow card) 2'; Yu Jae-ho (yellow card) 86'	Report	Jasir Asani 70'; Kim Kyeong-min (yellow card) 90+7'	Stadium: Jeonju World Cup Stadium; Attendance: 15,178; Referee: Park Byung-jin

17 August 2024 27	Jeonbuk Hyundai Motors	2-1	Pohang Steelers	Jeonju
19:00 UTC+9	Andrigo 44'; Kwon Chang-hoon 90+10'; Kim Jin-gyu (yellow card) 61'; Hong Jeong-ho (yellow card) 89'	Report	Wanderson 72'; Lee Tae-seok (yellow card) 41'	Stadium: Jeonju World Cup Stadium; Attendance: 14,814; Referee: Kim Woo-sung

24 August 2024 28	Incheon United FC	0-1	Jeonbuk Hyundai Motors	Incheon
19:30 UTC+9		Report	Kim Jin-gyu 8' (yellow card) 45+2'; Hong Jeong-Ho (yellow card) 84'	Stadium: Incheon Football Stadium; Attendance: 15,422; Referee: Park Byung-jin

1 September 2024 29	Jeonbuk Hyundai Motors	0-0	FC Seoul	Jeonju
19:00 UTC+9	Tiago (yellow card) 35'; Hong Jeong-Ho (yellow card) 36'; Nana Boateng (yellow card) 45'	Report	Lucas Rodrigues (yellow card) 50'; Rodrigues Tavares (yellow card) 70'	Stadium: Jeonju World Cup Stadium; Attendance: 22,749; Referee: Lee Dong-jun

14 September 2024 30	Suwon FC	0-6	Jeonbuk Hyundai Motors	Suwon
19:00 UTC+9	Choi Kyu-Baek (yellow card) 51'; Ahn Joon-Soo (yellow card) 55'; Jang Yeong-Woo (yellow card) 61'	Report	Lee Yeong-jae 18'; Song Min-kyu 58' (pen.); Andrigo 70'; Jeon Jin-woo 87'; Lee Seung-woo 90+2'; Hernandes Rodrigues 90+7'	Stadium: Suwon Sports Complex; Attendance: 9,136; Referee: Choi Hyun-jae

22 September 2024 31	Daejeon Hana Citizen	0-0	Jeonbuk Hyundai Motors	Daejeon
19:00 UTC+9	Bobsin Pereira (yellow card) 25'; Choi Geon-Ju (yellow card) 39'; Lee Sang-Min (yellow card) 77'; Anton Krivotsyuk (yellow card) 85' (red card) 90+3'; Kim Moon-Hwan (yellow card) 90+6'	Report	Hernandes (yellow card) 23'; Kim Tae-Hyun (yellow card) 67'; Nana Boateng (yellow card) 85'	Stadium: Daejeon World Cup Stadium; Attendance: 18,473; Referee: Kim Hee-gon

28 September 2024 32	Jeonbuk Hyundai Motors	2-1	Jeju United	Jeonju
19:00 UTC+9	Kim Jin-gyu 60'; Jeon Jin-woo 90+6'; Lee Seung-Woo (yellow card) 24'; Hong Jeong-Ho (yellow card) 41'; Nana Boateng (yellow card) 90+2'	Report	Yuri 86' (pen.); Lim Chai-Min (yellow card) 22'; Isidio Jefferson Fernando (yellow card) 22'	Stadium: Jeonju World Cup Stadium; Attendance: 21,386; Referee: Kim Woo-sung

6 October 2024 33	Daegu FC	4-3	Jeonbuk Hyundai Motors	Daegu
15:00 UTC+9	Cesinha 7'; Ítalo 37'; Edgar) 90+5'; Park Se-Jin 90+7'	Report	Lee Yeong-jae 59'; Ahn Hyeon-beom 80'; Moon Seon-min 88'	Stadium: DGB Daegu Bank Park; Attendance: 12,072; Referee: Jeong Dong-sik

19 October 2024 34	Jeonbuk Hyundai Motors	0-2	Daejeon Hana Citizen	Jeonju
14:00 UTC+9	Park Jin-Seob (yellow card) 60'	Report	Kim Jun-bum 42', 90+4'	Stadium: Jeonju World Cup Stadium; Attendance: 18,261; Referee: Kim Chong-hyuk

27 October 2024 35	Jeju United	1-0	Jeonbuk Hyundai Motors	Seogwipo
16:30 UTC+9	Song Ju-hun 71'; Kim Geon-Woong (yellow card) 56'	Report		Stadium: Jeju World Cup Stadium; Attendance: 6,376; Referee: Kim Hee-gon

2 November 2024 36	Jeonbuk Hyundai Motors	0-0	Incheon United FC	Jeonju
14:00 UTC+9	Lee Yeong-Jae (yellow card) 20'; Nana Boateng (yellow card) 77'	Report	Jung Dong-Yoon (yellow card) 23'	Stadium: Jeonju World Cup Stadium; Attendance: 18,244; Referee: Lee Dong-jun

10 November 2024 37	Jeonbuk Hyundai Motors	3-1	Daegu FC	Jeonju
16:30 UTC+9	Kim Jin-gyu 70'; Kwon Chang-hoon 86'; Lee Seung-woo 89'	Report	Hwang Jae-won 90+7' (pen.)	Stadium: Jeonju World Cup Stadium; Attendance: 18,985; Referee: Kim Chong-hyuk

24 November 2024 38	Gwangju FC	1-1	Jeonbuk Hyundai Motors	Gwangju
14:00 UTC+9	Sin Chang-moo 90+3' (pen.); Kim Jin-Ho (yellow card) 28'; Doo Hyun-Seok (yellow card) 45+3'	Report	Tiago Orobó 75'; Park Jin-seop (yellow card) 30'; Han Kook-young (yellow card) 74'; Kim Tae-Hyun (yellow card) 90'; Lee Yeong-jae (yellow card) 90+1'	Stadium: Gwangju Football Stadium; Attendance: 7,957; Referee: Ko Hyung-jin

==== Relegation Play-off ====
1 December 2024 Relegation play-offs Leg 1	Seoul E-Land	1-2	Jeonbuk Hyundai Motors	Seoul
16:00 UTC+9	Osmar Ibáñez 49'; John Montano (yellow card) 17'; Kim Oh-Kyu (yellow card) 86'; Bruno Silva (yellow card) 90+3'	Report	Tiago Orobó 38'; Jeon Jin-woo 83'; Kim Tae-hyun (yellow card) 86'; Park Jin-seob (yellow card) 90+1'	Stadium: Mokdong Stadium; Attendance: 13,205; Referee: Shin Yong-jun

8 December 2024 Relegation play-offs Leg 2	Jeonbuk Hyundai Motors	2-1 (4–2 agg.)	Seoul E-Land	Jeonju
14:25 UTC+9	Tiago Orobó 51' (yellow card) 51'; Moon Seon-min 90+8'; Kim Tae-hwan (red card) 88'	Report	Bruno Silva 45+2'; Park Chang-Hwan (yellow card) 63'; Lee Joon-suk (red card) 88'	Stadium: Jeonju World Cup Stadium; Referee: Kim Chong-hyuk

=== Korean FA Cup ===
19 June 2024 Rd 4	(K2) Gimpo FC	1-0	Jeonbuk Hyundai Motors	Gimpo
19.00 UTC+7	Bruno Paraíba 5'			Stadium: Gimpo Solteo Football Field

=== 2023–24 AFC Champions League ===
==== Knock Out ====
14 February 2024 Rd 16 Leg 1	Jeonbuk Hyundai Motors (South Korea)	2-0	(South Korea) Pohang Steelers	Jeonju, Korea
19.00 UTC+7	Hernandes Rodrigues 17'; Ahn Hyeon-beom 64'; Tiago Orobó (yellow card) 57'	Report	Shin Kwang-Hoon (yellow card) 7'	Stadium: Jeonju World Cup Stadium; Attendance: 10,966; Referee: Shaun Evans (Australia)

20 February 2024 Rd 16 Leg 2	Pohang Steelers (South Korea)	1-1 (1–3 agg.)	(South Korea) Jeonbuk Hyundai Motors	Pohang, Korea
20.00 UTC+8	Park Chan-yong 12'	Report	Jeong Tae-wook 76'; Lee Yeong-jae (yellow card) 23'; Lee Soo-bin (yellow card) 53'	Stadium: Pohang Steel Yard; Attendance: 5,680; Referee: Khalid Saleh (Saudi Arabia)

5 March 2024 QF Leg 1	Jeonbuk Hyundai Motors (South Korea)	1-1	(South Korea) Ulsan Hyundai	Jeonju, Korea
19.00 UTC+7	Song Min-kyu 4'; Tiago Orobó (penalty missed) 25; Moon Seon-min (yellow card) 42'		Lee Myung-jae 77' (yellow card) 22'	Stadium: Jeonju World Cup Stadium; Attendance: 9,338; Referee: Adel Al Naqbi (United Arab Emirates)

12 March 2024 QF Leg 2	Ulsan Hyundai (South Korea)	1-0 (2–1 agg.)	(South Korea) Jeonbuk Hyundai Motors	Ulsan, Korea
19.00 UTC+7	Seol Young-woo 45+2'; Joo Min-kyu (yellow card) 45+2'; Jo Hyeon-woo (yellow card) 90+5'	Report	Park Jin-seop (yellow card) 45'	Stadium: Ulsan Munsu Football Stadium; Referee: Alireza Faghani (Iran)

=== 2024–25 AFC Champions League Two ===
==== Group stage ====
Pos	Team	Pld	W	D	L	GF	GA	GD	Pts	Qualification	JBH	MTU	SEL	DHC
1	(South Korea) Jeonbuk Hyundai Motors	6	4	0	2	16	4	+12	12	Advance to round of 16	—	4–1	1–0	4–0
2	(Thailand) Muangthong United	6	3	2	1	16	10	+6	11	Advance to round of 16	1–0	—	1–1	2–2
3	(Malaysia) Selangor	6	3	1	2	9	5	+4	10		2–1	1–2	—	1–0
4	(Philippines) DH Cebu	6	0	1	5	4	26	−22	1		0–6	2–9	0–4	—

Source: AFC
Rules for classification: Tiebreakers

19 September 2024 Matchday 1	Cebu F.C. (Philippines)	0–6	(South Korea) Jeonbuk Hyundai Motors	Manila, Philippines
		Report	Jin Tae-Ho 15'; Kim Chang-hoon 35'; Moon Seon-min 45+1'; Bak Jae-yong 49'; Yu Je-Ho 74'; Park Chae-Jun 77'; Kim Tae-Hwan (yellow card) 82'	Stadium: Rizal Memorial Stadium; Attendance: 417; Referee: Hussein Abo Yehia (Lebanon)

3 October 2024 Matchday 2	Jeonbuk Hyundai Motors (South Korea)	4–1	(Thailand) Muangthong United	Jeonju, South Korea
	Moon Seon-min 51', 59'; Lee Yeong-jae 55'; Jin Tae-Ho 84'	Report	Sorawit Panthong 66'	Stadium: Jeonju World Cup Stadium; Attendance: 6,499; Referee: Hanna Hattab (Syria)

23 October 2024 Matchday 3	Selangor (Malaysia)	2–1	(South Korea) Jeonbuk Hyundai Motors	Petaling Jaya, Malaysia
	Harith Haiqal 31'; Ali Olwan 33'; Yohandry Orozco (yellow card) 90+7' (yellow-red card) 90+7'	Report	Kwon Chang-hoon 40'	Stadium: Petaling Jaya Stadium; Attendance: 7,257; Referee: Mooud Bonyadifard (Iran)

7 November 2024 Matchday 4	Jeonbuk Hyundai Motors (South Korea)	1–0	(Malaysia) Selangor	Jeonju, South Korea
	Tiago Orobó 22'	Report		Stadium: Jeonju World Cup Stadium; Attendance: 3,231; Referee: Liu Kwok Man (Hong Kong)

28 November 2024 Matchday 5	Jeonbuk Hyundai Motors (South Korea)	4–0	(Philippines) Cebu F.C.	Jeonju, South Korea
	Lee Seung-woo 6' (pen.) (yellow card) 42'; Jeon Byung-kwan 29'; Jeon Jin-woo 52'; Song Min-kyu 72'	Report	Daniel Henrique (yellow card) 40'; Daniel Gadia (yellow card) 50'	Stadium: Jeonju World Cup Stadium; Attendance: 2,031; Referee: Gamini Nivon Robesh (Sri Lanka)

5 December 2024 Matchday 6	Muangthong United (Thailand)	1–0	(South Korea) Jeonbuk Hyundai Motors	Nonthaburi, Thailand
	Purachet Thodsanit 45+1'; Abbos Otakhonov (yellow card) 35'; John-Patrick Strauß (yellow card) 54'; Poramet Arjvirai (yellow card) 72'		Jang Nam-Ung (yellow card) 39'; Choi Chul-soon (yellow card) 72'	Stadium: Thunderdome Stadium; Referee: Jansen Foo (Singapore)

==== Knockout stage ====
13 February 2025 R16 Leg 1	Port (Thailand)	–	(South Korea) Jeonbuk Hyundai Motors	Pathum Thani, Thailand
				Stadium: BG Stadium

20 February 2025 R16 Leg 2	Jeonbuk Hyundai Motors (South Korea)	–	(Thailand) Port	Jeonju, South Korea
				Stadium: Jeonju World Cup Stadium

=== K League 4 (For "B" team) ===
9 March 2024 1	Seoul Jungrang	3-1	Jeonbuk Hyundai Motors B	Seoul
				Stadium: Jungnang-gu Sports Complex

31 March 2024 2	Jeonbuk Hyundai Motors B	3-1	Namyangju Citizen Football Team	Jeonju
				Stadium: Wanju Public Stadium

7 April 2024 3	Jinju Citizen Football Team	1-1	Jeonbuk Hyundai Motors B	Jinju
				Stadium: Jinju Stadium

21 April 2024 4	Jeonbuk Hyundai Motors B	2-3	FC Chungju	Jeonju
				Stadium: Wanju Public Stadium

28 April 2024 5	Seoul Nowon	0-2	Jeonbuk Hyundai Motors B	Seoul
				Stadium: Nowarmmadel Sports Town

5 May 2024 6	Jeonbuk Hyundai Motors B	0-1	Daejeon Hana Citizen B	Jeonju
				Stadium: Wanju Public Stadium

11 May 2024 7	Sejong Barnes FC	2-0	Jeonbuk Hyundai Motors B	Sejong
				Stadium: Sejong Citizens' Stadium

18 May 2024 8	Jeonbuk Hyundai Motors B	1-2	Geoje Citizen	Jeonju
				Stadium: Wanju Public Stadium

26 May 2024 9	Pyeongchang	2-3	Jeonbuk Hyundai Motors B	Pyeongchang
				Stadium: Jinbu Sports Park Football Stadium

2 June 2024 10	Jeonbuk Hyundai Motors B	4-1	Dangjin Citizen	Jeonju
				Stadium: Clubhouse Artificial Field

9 June 2024 11	Pyeongtaek Citizen	1-2	Jeonbuk Hyundai Motors B	Pyeongtaek
				Stadium: Sosabelportstown Main Stadium

15 June 2024 12	Jeonbuk Hyundai Motors B	2-0	Jeonju citizens	Jeonju
				Stadium: Clubhouse Artificial Field

22 June 2024 13	Jeonbuk Hyundai Motors B	3-1	Seoul Jungrang	Jeonju
				Stadium: Clubhouse Artificial Field

29 June 2024 14	Namyangju Citizen Football Team	1-1	Jeonbuk Hyundai Motors B	Namyangju
				Stadium: Namyangju City Sports Complex Assistance

6 July 2024 15	Jeonbuk Hyundai Motors B	2-1	Jinju Citizen	Jeonju
				Stadium: Wanju Public Stadium

20 July 2024 16	FC Chungju	0-2	Jeonbuk Hyundai Motors B	Chungju
				Stadium: Chungju Sports Complex

17 August 2024 17	Jeonbuk Hyundai Motors B	1-1	Seoul Nowon	Jeonju
				Stadium: Wanju Public Stadium

25 August 2024 18	Daejeon Hana Citizen B	1-3	Jeonbuk Hyundai Motors B	Daejeon
				Stadium: Daejeon Hana Citizen B

31 August 2024 19	Jeonbuk Hyundai Motors B	4-1	FC Sejong	Jeonju
				Stadium: Wanju Public Stadium

7 September 2024 20	Geoje Citizen	1-3	Jeonbuk Hyundai Motors B	Geoje
				Stadium: Geoje Sports Complex

18 October 2024 21 (Rescheduled)	Jeonbuk Hyundai Motors B	4-2	Pyeongchang	Jeonju
				Stadium: Wanju Public Stadium

28 September 2024 22	Dangjin Citizen	4-2	Jeonbuk Hyundai Motors B	Dangjin
				Stadium: Dangjin Sports Complex

6 October 2024 23	Jeonbuk Hyundai Motors B	5-0	Pyeongtaek Citizen	Jeonju
				Stadium: Wanju Public Stadium

26 October 2024 24	Jeonju Citizens	1-2	Jeonbuk Hyundai Motors B	Jeonju
				Stadium: Jeonju Stadium

== Team statistics ==
=== Appearances and goals ===
As of 8 December 24

No.	Pos.	Player	K-League		Play-off		Korean FA Cup		2023–24 AFC Champions League		2024–25 AFC Champions League Two		Total	
No.	Pos.	Player	Apps	Goals	Apps	Goals	Apps	Goals	Apps	Goals	Apps	Goals	Apps	Goals
1	GK	(South Korea) Kim Jeong-hoon	6	0	0	0	1	0	4	0	5	0	16	0
4	DF	(South Korea) Park Jin-seop	26+1	0	2	0	0	0	4	0	0	0	34	0
5	DF	(South Korea) Jang Min-jun	0	0	0	0	0	0	0	0	0	0	0	0
6	MF	(South Korea) Lee Soo-bin	19+4	0	0	0	0	0	4	0	5+1	0	33	0
8	MF	(South Korea) Lee Yeong-jae	29+5	4	2	0	1	0	2+1	0	0+1	1	41	5
9	FW	(Brazil) Tiago Orobó	19+13	8	2	1	1	0	4	0	2	1	41	10
10	MF	(South Korea) Song Min-kyu	19+9	6	1	0	1	0	3	1	0+2	1	35	8
11	FW	(South Korea) Lee Seung-woo	2+10	2	0+1	0	0	0	0	0	2	1	15	3
14	MF	(South Korea) Lee Jae-ik	15+2	1	0	0	1	0	0+1	0	1+1	0	20	2
15	DF	(South Korea) Ku Ja-ryong	10+3	0	0	0	1	0	0	0	6	0	20	0
16	FW	(South Korea) Bak Jae-yong	9+6	1	0	0	0	0	0	0	3+1	1	19	2
17	DF	(South Korea) Ahn Hyeon-beom	19+7	2	1	0	0	0	2+1	1	0	0	30	3
18	FW	(South Korea) Jeon Jin-woo	3+9	2	0+1	1	0	0	0	0	0+1	1	14	4
19	MF	(Ghana) Nana Boateng	15+6	0	0	0	1	0	0	0	2	0	24	0
21	DF	(South Korea) Park Chang-woo	3+9	0	0	0	0	0	0	0	4+1	0	17	0
22	DF	(South Korea) Jeong Woo-jae	5+7	0	0	0	0	0	0+1	0	3+1	0	16	0
23	DF	(South Korea) Kim Jin-su	18+2	0	0	0	1	0	4	0	0	0	25	0
24	MF	(South Korea) Ma Ji-kang	0	0	0	0	0	0	0	0	0	0	0	0
25	DF	(South Korea) Choi Chul-soon	3+3	0	0	0	1	0	0	0	3+1	0	11	0
26	DF	(South Korea) Hong Jeong-ho	17+2	0	0+1	0	0	0	3	0	0	0	23	0
27	FW	(South Korea) Moon Seon-min	11+19	7	1	0	0	0	2+1	0	2	3	36	10
28	MF	(South Korea) Maeng Seong-ung	4+3	0	0	0	0	0	3+1	0	0	0	11	0
30	MF	(Brazil) Andrigo	12+3	3	0	0	0	0	0	0	0	0	15	3
31	GK	(South Korea) Gong Si-Hyeon	0	0	0	0	0	0	0	0	1	0	1	0
33	MF	(South Korea) Jeon Byung-kwan	24+4	5	1	0	1	0	0+1	0	1	1	32	6
36	MF	(South Korea) Jang Nam-Ung	0	0	0	0	0	0	0	0	1+1	0	2	0
37	MF	(South Korea) Park Jun-Beom	0	0	0	0	0	0	0	0	1+1	0	2	0
39	DF	(South Korea) Kim Tae-hwan	18+1	1	1+1	0	0	0	3+1	0	2	0	27	1
44	MF	(South Korea) Kim Ha-jun	0+4	0	1+1	0	0	0	0	0	4	0	10	0
47	MF	(South Korea) Park Chae-Jun	0	0	0	0	0	0	0	0	1+2	1	3	1
49	MF	(South Korea) Sung Jin-young	0	0	0	0	0	0	0	0	0	0	0	0
50	DF	(South Korea) Jin Si-woo	1+2	0	0	0	0	0	0	0	1+2	0	6	0
61	MF	(South Korea) Jin Tae-Ho	0	0	0	0	0	0	0	0	4+2	2	6	2
62	MF	(South Korea) Seo Jeong-Hyeok	0	0	0	0	0	0	0	0	0+4	0	4	0
63	MF	(South Korea) Han Seok-Jin	0	0	0	0	0	0	0	0	0+3	0	3	0
66	DF	(South Korea) Kim Tae-Hyun	13	0	2	0	0	0	0	0	0	0	15	0
70	MF	(South Korea) Gong Si-Hyeon	0	0	0	0	0	0	0	0	1	0	1	0
71	GK	(South Korea) Kim Jun-hong	15+1	0	2	0	0	0	0	0	0	0	18	0
77	FW	(South Korea) Park Si-Hwa	1+6	2	1	0	0	0	0	0	2	1	10	3
81	MF	(South Korea) Yu Je-ho	2+3	0	0	0	0	0	0	0	4+1	1	10	1
91	MF	(South Korea) Han Kook-young	18+3	0	1	0	0	0	0	0	0	0	22	0
94	DF	(South Korea) Yeon Je-un	3+1	0	2	0	0	0	0	0	0	0	6	0
97	MF	(South Korea) Kim Jin-gyu	11+3	4	2	0	0	0	0	0	0	0	16	4
98	FW	(Brazil) Hernandes Rodrigues	6+8	0	0	0	0	0	1	1	0	0	15	2
99	MF	(South Korea) Kim Chang-hoon	0	0	0	0	0	0	0	0	5	1	5	1
Players featured on a match but left the club mid-season permanently
2	DF	(Czech Republic) Tomáš Petrášek	1	0	0	0	0	0	0+1	0	0	0	2	0
13	GK	(South Korea) Jeong Min-Ki	16	0	0	0	0	0	0	0	0	0	16	0
80	MF	(Brazil) Marcus Vinícius	3+1	0	0	0	0	0	0+2	0	0	0	6	0
Players featured on a match but left the club mid-season on loan transfer
3	DF	(South Korea) Jeong Tae-wook	9+5	0	0	0	0	0	1+2	1	0	0	17	1
7	FW	(South Korea) Han Kyo-won	8+7	0	0	0	1	0	1+2	0	0	0	19	0
11	FW	(South Korea) Lee Dong-jun	2+4	1	0	0	0	0	3+1	0	0	0	10	1
18	DF	(South Korea) Lee Jun-ho	3+1	0	0	0	0	0	0	0	0	0	4	0
29	MF	(South Korea) Lee Ji-hoon	1	0	0	0	0	0	0	0	0	0	1	0
30	FW	(South Korea) Lee Gyu-dong	2+4	0	0	0	0	0	0+1	0	0	0	7	0
96	MF	(South Korea) Park Ju-yeong	0+3	0	0	0	0	0	0	0	0	0	3	0
