= Kim Jin-kyu =

Kim Jin-kyu may refer to:

- Kim Jin-kyu (footballer, born 1985), South Korean football player
- Kim Jin-kyu (actor) (1922–1998)
- Kim Jin-gyu (footballer, born 1997), South Korean football player
