= Jorge Teixeira (footballer, born 1999) =

Brazilian footballer

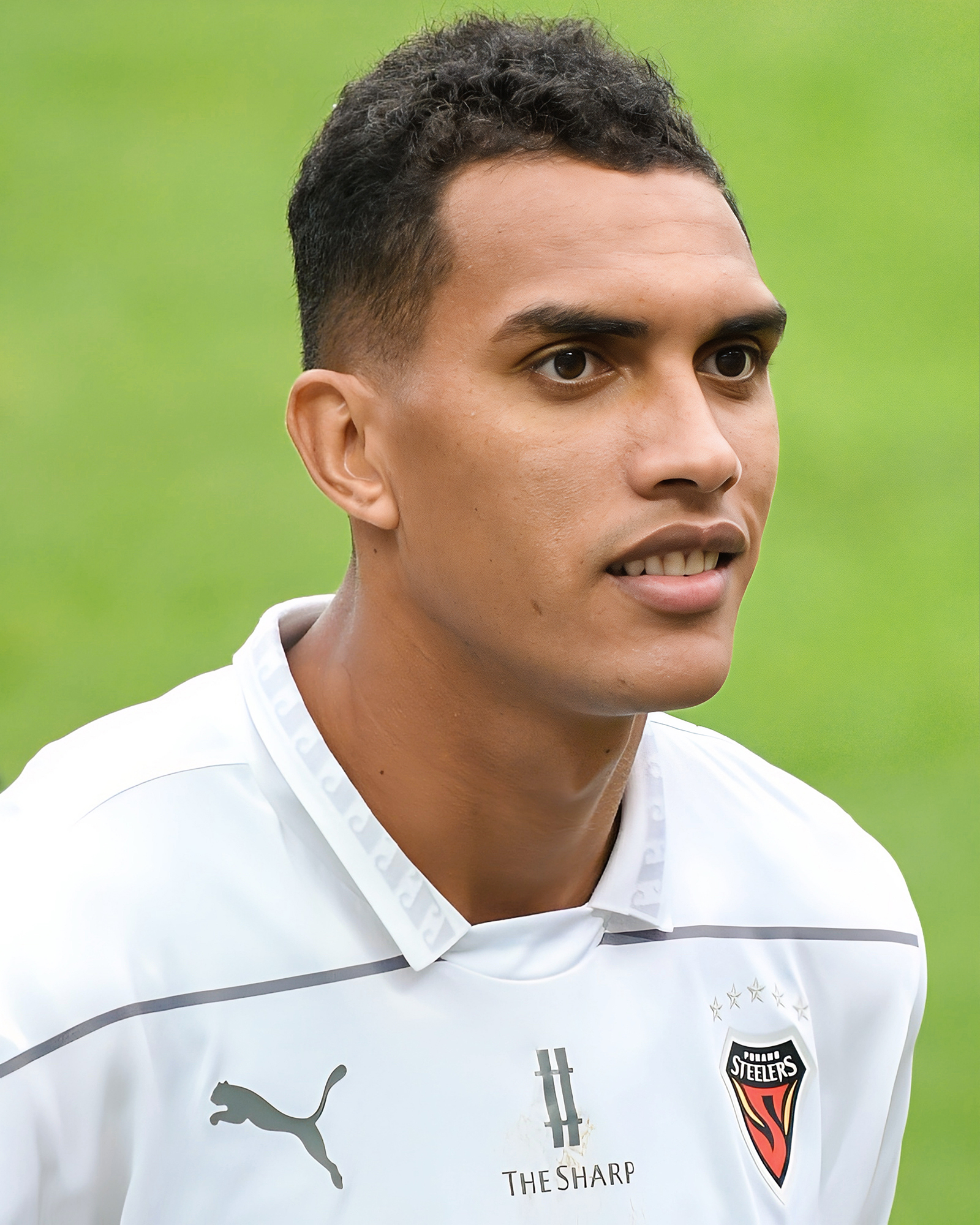
- Jorge Teixeira in 2025

Personal information
- Full name: Jorge Luiz Barbosa Teixeira
- Date of birth: 21 June 1999 (age 27)
- Place of birth: Pitangui, Brazil
- Height: 1.90 m (6 ft 3 in)
- Position: Forward

Team information
- Current team: Pohang Steelers
- Number: 25

Youth career
- –2019: Capital
- 2019–2020: Grêmio

Senior career*
Years	Team	Apps	(Gls)
2020–2021	Oliveirense	24	(6)
2021–2024	Feirense	38	(6)
2023	→ Chungbuk Cheongju FC (loan)	34	(13)
2024–	Pohang Steelers	74	(9)
- * Club domestic league appearances and goals as of 3 August 2026

Jorge Luiz Barbosa Teixeira (born 21 June 1999), commonly known as Jorge Teixeira, is a Brazilian professional footballer who plays as a forward for K League club Pohang Steelers.

== Career ==
On 4 January 2024, after having spent the previous season on loan at K League 2 club Chungbuk Cheongju FC, Jorge Teixeira left Liga Portugal 2 side Feirense and moved permanently to K League club Pohang Steelers.

== Career statistics ==
=== Club ===
As of match played 11 April 2026.

Appearances and goals by club, season and competition
Club	Season	League			Cup		League cup		Continental		Other		Total	
Club	Season	Division	Apps	Goals	Apps	Goals	Apps	Goals	Apps	Goals	Apps	Goals	Apps	Goals
Oliveirense	2020–21	Liga Portugal 2	24	6	1	0	—		—		—		25	6
Feirense	2021–22	Liga Portugal 2	23	3	2	1	0	0	—		—		25	4
Feirense	2022–23	Liga Portugal 2	15	3	1	0	4 (Note: Appearance(s) in Taça da Liga)	1	—		—		20	4
Feirense	Total		38	6	3	1	4	1	—		—		45	8
Chungbuk Cheongju (loan)	2023	K League 2	34	13	1	0	—		—		—		35	13
Pohang Steelers	2024	K League 1	34	4	3	1	—		7 (Note: Two appearances in AFC Champions League, five appearances and two goals in AFC Champions League Elite)	2	—		44	7
Pohang Steelers	2025	K League 1	36	5	1	0	—		4 (Note: Two appearances in AFC Champions League Elite, two appearances in AFC Champions League Two)	0	—		41	5
Pohang Steelers	2026	K League 1	4	0	0	0	—		0	0	—		4	0
Pohang Steelers	Total		74	9	4	1	—		11	2	—		89	12
Career total			170	34	9	2	4	1	11	2	0	0	194	39
