= Lee Jae-ik =

South Korean footballer (born 1999)

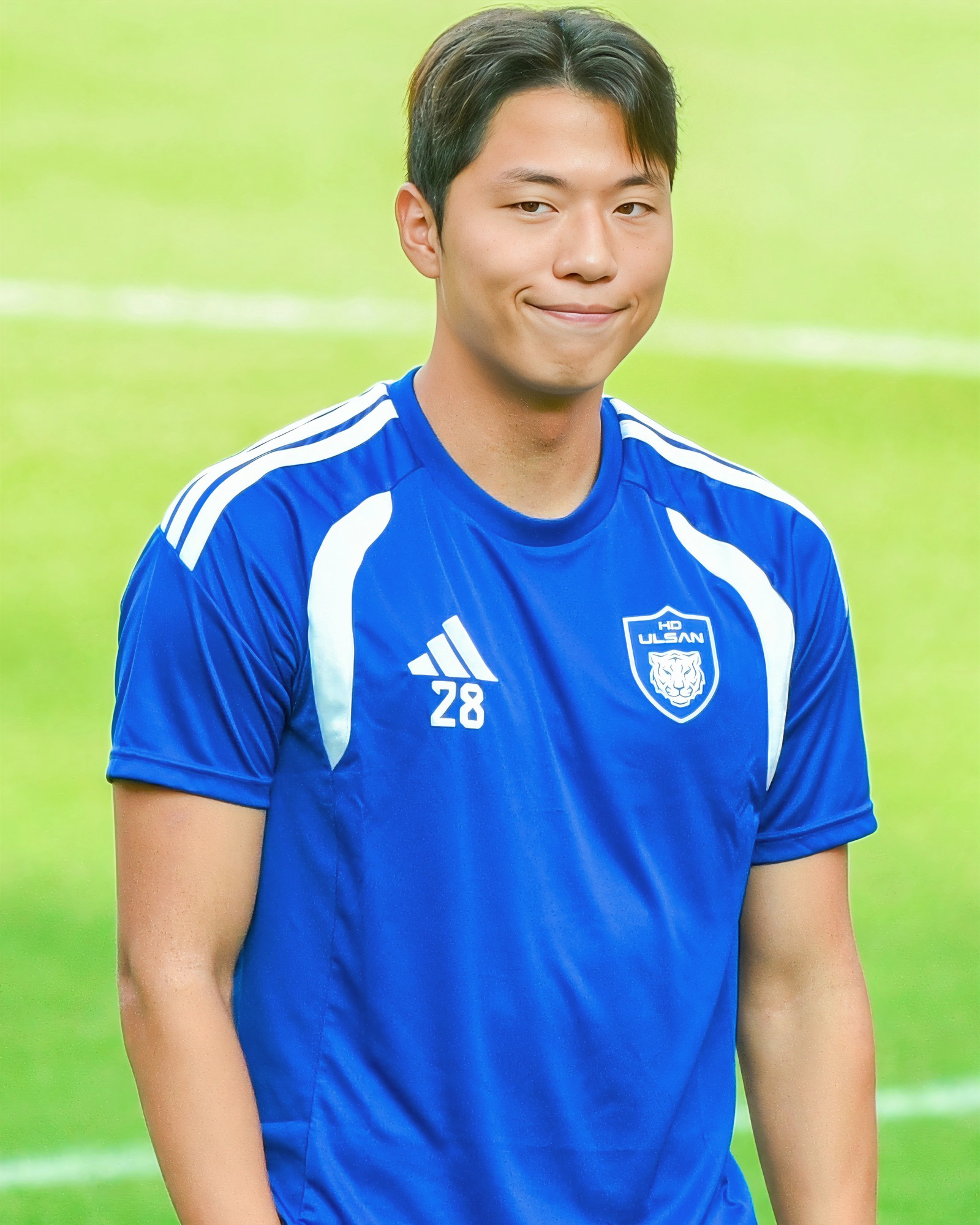
- Lee with Ulsan HD in 2026

Personal information
- Full name: Lee Jae-ik
- Date of birth: 21 May 1999 (age 27)
- Place of birth: Uijeongbu, Gyeonggi-do, South Korea
- Height: 1.85 m (6 ft 1 in)
- Position: Defender

Team information
- Current team: Ulsan HD
- Number: 28

Youth career
- 2015–2017: Boin High School

Senior career*
Years	Team	Apps	(Gls)
2018–2019	Gangwon FC	11	(0)
2019–2021	Al-Rayyan	10	(1)
2020–2021	→ Antwerp (loan)	0	(0)
2021–2023	Seoul E-Land	65	(1)
2024–2025	Jeonbuk Hyundai Motors	17	(1)
2025–	Ulsan HD	31	(0)

International career^{‡}
2013	South Korea U-14	8	(0)
2016–2019	South Korea U-20	27	(1)
2019–2023	South Korea U-23	5	(1)
2022–	South Korea	1	(0)
Medal record
Men's football
Representing South Korea
Asian Games
Gold medal – first place	2022 Hangzhou	Team
FIFA U-20 World Cup
Runner-up	2019 Poland
Representing South Korea
EAFF Championship
Runner-up	2022 Japan	Team
- * Club domestic league appearances and goals as of August 3, 2026 ‡ National team caps and goals as of September 21, 2023

- Lee Jae-ik
- Hangul: 이재익
- Hanja: 李在益
- RR: I Jaeik
- MR: I Chaeik

Lee Jae-ik (Korean: 이재익; born 21 May 1999) is a South Korean football defender who plays for Ulsan HD and the South Korea national team.

== Career statistics ==
=== Club ===
As of 27 July 2025

Club performance			League		Cup		Continental		Other		Total	
Season	Club	League	Apps	Goals	Apps	Goals	Apps	Goals	Apps	Goals	Apps	Goals
2018	Gangwon FC	K League 1	8	0	0	0	—		—		8	0
2019	Gangwon FC	K League 1	3	0	2	0	—		—		5	0
2019–20	Al-Rayyan	QSL	10	1	0	0	1 (Note: Appearance in AFC Champions League Elite)	0	1 (Note: Appearance in Qatari Stars Cup)	0	12	1
2020–21	Antwerp (loan)	Belgian First Division A	0	0	0	0	—		—		0	0
2021	Seoul E-Land	K League 2	15	0	0	0	—		—		15	0
2022	Seoul E-Land	K League 2	29	1	0	0	—		—		29	1
2023	Seoul E-Land	K League 2	21	0	1	0	—		—		22	0
2024	Jeonbuk Hyundai Motors	K League 1	17	1	1	0	3 (Note: One appearance in AFC Champions League, two appearances in AFC Champions League Two)	0	—		21	1
2025	Ulsan HD	K League 1	9	0	2	0	1	0	2 (Note: Appearance in FIFA Club World Cup)	0	14	0
Career total			112	3	6	0	5	0	3	0	126	3

== Honours ==
South Korea U20

- FIFA U-20 World Cup runner-up: 2019

South Korea U23

- Asian Games: 2022

South Korea

- EAFF E-1 Football Championship runner-up: 2022
