= 2023 K League 2 =

Eleventh season of the K League 2, the second tier South Korean professional league

Hana 1Q K League 2
- Season: 2023
- Dates: 1 March – 26 November 2023
- Champions: Gimcheon Sangmu (2nd title)
- Promoted: Gimcheon Sangmu
- Matches: 179
- Goals: 452 (2.53 per match)
- Best player: Valdívia
- Top goalscorer: Luis Mina (14 goals)
- Biggest away win: Jeonnam 0–5 Gyeongnam (5 March 2023)
- Highest scoring: Ansan 3–7 Gimcheon (22 October 2023)
- Longest unbeaten run: 12 matches Gimpo FC
- Longest winless run: 20 matches Cheonan City
- Longest losing run: 7 matches Cheonan City

The 2023 K League 2, also known as the Hana 1Q K League 2 for sponsorship reasons, was the 11th season of the K League 2, the second-highest division in South Korean football league system.

Following the regular season, in which each team played each other three times, Gimcheon Sangmu were the champions, gaining direct promotion to K League 1. After three rounds of play-offs, no other teams were promoted at the end of this season.

== Teams ==
=== Team changes ===
2022 champions Gwangju FC and play-off winners Daejeon Hana Citizen were promoted to the K League 1, while Seongnam FC and Gimcheon Sangmu were relegated from the top flight.

Cheonan City and Chungbuk Cheongju, which played in the K3 League until 2022, joined the K League and made their professional debuts in the K League 2.

Incoming
▼ Relegated from K League 1
- Gimcheon Sangmu
- Seongnam FC
▲ Promoted from K3 League
- Cheonan City
- Chungbuk Cheongju

Outgoing
▲ Promoted to K League 1
- Gwangju FC
- Daejeon Hana Citizen

=== Locations ===
Locations of the 2023 K League 2 teams

Team	City/Province	Abbreviation
Ansan Greeners	Ansan	Ansan
FC Anyang	Anyang	Anyang
Bucheon FC 1995	Bucheon	Bucheon
Busan IPark	Busan	Busan
Cheonan City	Cheonan	Cheonan
Chungbuk Cheongju	Cheongju	Chungbuk Cheongju
Chungnam Asan	Asan	Chungnam Asan
Gimcheon Sangmu	Gimcheon	Gimcheon
Gimpo FC	Gimpo	Gimpo
Gyeongnam FC	Gyeongnam	Gyeongnam
Jeonnam Dragons	Jeonnam	Jeonnam
Seongnam FC	Seongnam	Seongnam
Seoul E-Land	Seoul	Seoul E

=== Stadiums ===
Ansan Greeners	FC Anyang	Bucheon FC 1995
Ansan Wa~ Stadium	Anyang Stadium	Bucheon Stadium
Capacity: **35,000**	Capacity: **17,143**	Capacity: **34,456**
Busan IPark		Chungnam Asan
Busan Asiad Main Stadium	Busan Gudeok Stadium	Yi Sun-sin Stadium
Capacity: **53,769**	Capacity: **12,349**	Capacity: **17,376**
Cheonan City	Chungbuk Cheongju	Gimpo FC
Cheonan Stadium	Cheongju Stadium	Gimpo Solteo Football Stadium
Capacity: **26,000**	Capacity: **16,280**	Capacity: **5,000**
Gyeongnam FC	Gimcheon Sangmu	Seongnam FC
Changwon Football Center	Gimcheon Stadium	Tancheon Stadium
Capacity: **15,074**	Capacity: **25,000**	Capacity: **16,146**
Jeonnam Dragons	Seoul E-Land	
Gwangyang Stadium	Mokdong Stadium	
Capacity: **13,496**	Capacity: **15,511**	

=== Foreign players ===
Restricting the number of foreign players strictly to five per team, including a slot for a player from the AFC and ASEAN countries. Gimcheon Sangmu FC, being a military-owned team, is not allowed to sign any foreign players. A team could use five foreign players on the field each game, including at least one player from the AFC and ASEAN.

Players in bold were registered during the mid-season transfer window.

Team	Player 1	Player 2	Player 3	AFC player	ASEAN player (Note: Did not exist in the regulation of AFC.)	Former player(s)
Ansan Greeners	(Brazil) Thiago Henrique	(Brazil) Wandrew				(Brazil) Gabriel Honório
FC Anyang	(Brazil) Yago	(Brazil) **Bruno Paraíba**	(Brazil) **Laércio**			(Costa Rica) Jonathan Moya (Brazil) Andrigo
Bucheon FC 1995	(Brazil) Nilson	(Brazil) Gabriel Ramos	(Portugal) **Jucie Lupeta**	(Japan) Kazuki Takahashi		(Brazil) Leonardo Kalil
Busan IPark	(Brazil) Bruno Lamas	(Brazil) Fessin	(Brazil) Franklin Mascote			
Cheonan City	(Brazil) Bruno Mota	(Croatia) Damir Šovšić	(Brazil) **Paulo Henrique**	(Vietnam) Vũ Minh Hiếu	(Vietnam) Nguyễn Cảnh Anh	(Brazil) Rodolfo (France) Axel Bakayoko
Chungbuk Cheongju	(Brazil) Paulinho	(Brazil) Jorge Teixeira		(Australia) Peter Makrillos		(Malaysia) Kogileswaran Raj
Chungnam Asan	(Brazil) Róbson Duarte	(Brazil) **Raphael Utzig**	(Colombia) **Wilinton Aponzá**			
Gimpo FC	(Uruguay) Pablo González	(Brazil) Juninho Rocha	(Colombia) Luis Mina			
Gyeongnam FC	(Brazil) Guilherme Castro	(Brazil) Gleyson	(Brazil) **Léo Ceará**			(Brazil) Mirandinha
Jeonnam Dragons	(Kosovo) Leonard Pllana	(Brazil) Valdívia	(Croatia) **Leo Mikić**	(Japan) Yuhei Sato	(Indonesia) Asnawi Mangkualam	(Sweden) Robin Simović
Seongnam FC	(Democratic Republic of the Congo) Christy Manzinga	(Brazil) Denilson	(Brazil) **Gabriel Honório**	(Australia) Patrick Flottmann		
Seoul E-Land	(Brazil) Ronan	(Brazil) Bruninho		(Japan) Tsubasa Nishi		(Vietnam) Nguyễn Văn Toàn (Brazil) Renan Peixoto

== League table ==
Pos	Team	Pld	W	D	L	GF	GA	GD	Pts	Promotion or qualification
1	Gimcheon Sangmu (C, P)	36	22	5	9	71	37	+34	71	Promotion to K League 1
2	Busan IPark	36	20	10	6	50	29	+21	70	Qualification for promotion play-offs final round
3	Gimpo FC	36	16	12	8	40	25	+15	60	Qualification for promotion play-offs second round
4	Gyeongnam FC	36	15	12	9	54	42	+12	57	Qualification for promotion play-offs first round
5	Bucheon FC 1995	36	16	9	11	45	35	+10	57	Qualification for promotion play-offs first round
6	FC Anyang	36	15	9	12	58	51	+7	54	
7	Jeonnam Dragons	36	16	5	15	55	56	−1	53	
8	Chungbuk Cheongju	36	13	13	10	37	42	−5	52	
9	Seongnam FC	36	11	11	14	43	50	−7	44	
10	Chungnam Asan	36	12	6	18	39	46	−7	42	
11	Seoul E-Land	36	10	5	21	36	54	−18	35	
12	Ansan Greeners	36	6	7	23	40	72	−32	25	
13	Cheonan City	36	5	10	21	33	62	−29	25	

Source: K League Soccerway
Rules for classification: 1) Points; 2) Goals scored; 3) Goal difference; 4) Wins; 5) Head-to-head points
(C) Champions; (P) Promoted

== Positions by matchday ==
Leaders, promotion to K League 1
Qualification for promotion play-offs final round
Qualification for promotion play-offs second round
Qualification for promotion play-offs first round

Team ╲ Round	1	2	3	4	5	6	7	8	9	10	11	12	13	14	15	16	17	18	19	20	21	22	23	24	25	26	27	28	29	30	31	32	33	34	35	36	37	38	39
Gimcheon Sangmu	3	2	3	6	7	6	2	2	1	3	2	2	2	3	6	6	5	5	3	2	2	1	1	1	1	1	1	1	1	2	2	2	2	2	2	2	2	2	1
Busan IPark	1	5	6	4	3	3	5	5	4	5	5	5	6	4	2	1	2	2	1	3	4	6	3	4	3	2	2	2	2	1	1	1	1	1	1	1	1	1	2
Gimpo FC	11	4	5	5	5	5	4	3	2	1	1	1	1	1	3	5	6	6	6	6	6	4	5	5	4	3	4	6	5	4	4	4	4	4	3	3	3	3	3
Gyeongnam FC	5	1	1	2	1	2	3	1	3	2	4	4	4	6	5	3	1	3	2	1	1	2	2	3	2	4	3	4	3	5	5	5	5	6	5	5	5	4	4
Bucheon FC 1995	12	9	2	1	4	4	7	9	6	7	6	6	3	5	4	4	4	4	5	5	5	5	6	6	6	6	6	5	4	3	3	3	3	3	4	4	4	5	5
FC Anyang	5	3	4	3	2	1	1	4	5	4	3	3	5	2	1	2	3	1	4	4	3	3	4	2	5	5	5	3	6	6	7	7	8	7	8	8	7	7	6
Jeonnam Dragons	12	13	10	11	8	8	8	8	9	8	8	8	8	10	9	9	9	8	8	7	7	7	7	7	7	7	7	7	8	8	8	6	7	8	6	7	6	6	7
Chungbuk Cheongju	1	6	7	7	9	9	10	11	12	12	12	12	11	11	11	11	10	11	11	9	10	9	8	9	8	7	8	8	7	7	6	8	6	5	7	6	8	8	8
Seongnam FC	3	7	9	8	6	7	6	6	8	6	7	7	7	7	7	7	8	10	10	11	9	8	9	8	9	9	9	9	9	9	9	9	9	9	9	9	10	9	9
Chungnam Asan	9	12	12	10	11	10	9	7	7	9	9	9	10	9	10	10	11	9	9	10	11	11	10	10	10	10	10	10	11	11	10	11	11	10	10	10	9	10	10
Seoul E-Land	7	10	11	12	12	11	11	10	11	11	10	10	9	8	8	8	7	7	7	8	8	10	11	11	11	11	11	11	10	10	11	10	10	11	11	11	11	11	11
Ansan Greeners	9	7	8	9	10	12	12	12	10	10	11	11	12	12	12	12	12	12	12	12	12	12	12	12	12	12	12	12	12	12	12	12	12	12	12	13	13	13	12
Cheonan City	7	11	13	13	13	13	13	13	13	13	13	13	13	13	13	13	13	13	13	13	13	13	13	13	13	13	13	13	13	13	13	13	13	13	13	12	12	12	13

Source: K League
Notes: The match between Chungnam Asan and Chungbuk Cheongju on matchday 26 (13 August) was postponed to 14 October.

== Results ==
=== Matches 1–26 ===
Home \ Away	ASG	AYG	BCN	BSI	CNC	CBCJ	CNAS	GCS	GIM	GNM	JND	SNM	SUE
Ansan Greeners	—	1–1	0–2	1–2	2–1	0–2	1–0	2–3	2–3	1–1	1–0	0–3	1–2
FC Anyang	1–1	—	2–2	0–3	1–1	1–0	3–0	2–0	1–2	2–4	2–0	2–1	1–1
Bucheon FC 1995	1–0	2–4	—	0–0	1–1	0–0	2–1	0–3	2–0	2–0	5–2	1–0	0–1
Busan IPark	0–0	2–1	0–1	—	1–0	1–1	2–0	3–1	0–0	0–0	1–0	2–3	1–0
Cheonan City	1–1	0–4	0–3	2–3	—	2–2	0–1	0–2	0–2	2–3	1–3	3–2	0–0
Chungbuk Cheongju	3–0	2–1	0–4	1–1	2–1	—	0–4	0–2	0–0	0–2	3–1	0–0	2–1
Chungnam Asan	1–0	2–3	1–0	1–1	1–0	3–2	—	1–2	0–1	2–2	3–3	2–0	2–0
Gimcheon Sangmu	3–2	0–0	4–1	2–1	4–1	0–0	3–2	—	0–2	0–2	2–1	4–0	4–0
Gimpo FC	0–1	1–0	1–1	1–0	4–0	1–2	1–1	2–1	—	0–0	1–2	0–0	0–0
Gyeongnam FC	3–1	3–2	1–0	1–2	2–1	2–2	2–1	0–2	0–0	—	0–2	2–2	1–2
Jeonnam Dragons	5–2	0–1	1–0	1–1	2–0	3–0	2–1	1–0	0–2	0–5	—	2–2	3–3
Seongnam FC	2–1	1–2	0–1	1–3	2–0	3–2	0–0	2–2	0–0	1–1	2–1	—	1–2
Seoul E-Land	4–1	1–2	2–0	1–2	3–2	2–3	0–0	0–1	0–1	1–2	0–1	1–2	—

Source: K League
Legend: Blue = home team win; Yellow = draw; Red = away team win.

=== Matches 27–39 ===
Home \ Away	ASG	AYG	BCN	BSI	CNC	CBCJ	CNAS	GCS	GIM	GNM	JND	SNM	SUE
Ansan Greeners	—	2–3	1–2	—	—	0–1	0–1	3–7	1–1	—	—	—	—
FC Anyang	—	—	—	0–1	2–1	—	—	—	—	1–1	3–1	1–1	3–0
Bucheon FC 1995	—	1–1	—	—	—	—	1–0	—	0–0	1–0	4–1	—	1–0
Busan IPark	2–0	—	2–1	—	0–0	1–1	—	2–0	—	—	—	3–0	—
Cheonan City	1–1	—	1–0	—	—	0–0	—	1–3	0–0	—	—	3–1	—
Chungbuk Cheongju	—	2–1	0–0	—	—	—	1–0	—	1–0	1–1	—	—	0–1
Chungnam Asan	—	4–3	—	1–2	2–0	—	—	—	—	0–1	0–1	—	1–0
Gimcheon Sangmu	—	4–1	3–1	—	—	0–0	4–0	—	2–0	—	—	—	1–0
Gimpo FC	—	3–0	—	2–3	—	—	1–0	—	—	0–1	2–1	—	2–1
Gyeongnam FC	4–2	—	—	0–1	1–1	—	—	1–1	—	—	2–3	0–2	—
Jeonnam Dragons	3–2	—	—	3–0	1–3	3–0	—	2–1	—	—	—	0–0	—
Seongnam FC	0–2	—	2–2	—	—	0–1	2–0	1–0	2–4	—	—	—	—
Seoul E-Land	3–4	—	—	2–1	0–3	—	—	—	—	1–3	1–0	0–2	—

Source: K League
Legend: Blue = home team win; Yellow = draw; Red = away team win.

== Promotion play-offs ==
The first round was contested between the fourth and fifth-placed teams, and its winners played the third-placed team in the second round. When the first and second round matches were finished as draws, their winners were decided on the regular season rankings without extra time and penalty shoot-outs.

The winners of the second round and the runners-up competed with the tenth and eleventh-placed teams of the K League 1, respectively, in the final round for the K League 1 spots of the next season. Each match of the final round was a two-legged tie.

=== Bracket ===
First round
4	Gyeongnam FC	0
5	Bucheon FC 1995	0

Second round
3	Gimpo FC	2
4	Gyeongnam FC	1

Final 1
Gimpo FC	0	1	1
Gangwon FC	0	2	2
Final 2
Busan IPark	2	2	4
Suwon FC (a.e.t.)	1	5	6

=== First round ===
29 November 2023
19:00 KST

Gyeongnam FC	0–0	Bucheon FC 1995

Changwon Football Center, Changwon

=== Second round ===
2 December 2023
16:30 KST

Gimpo FC	2–1	Gyeongnam FC
Luis Mina 30'; Kim Jong-suk 45+1'		Won Ki-jong 36'

Solteo Football Field, Gimpo

=== Final round ===
Team 1	Agg.	Team 2	1st leg	2nd leg
Gimpo FC	1–2	Gangwon FC	0–0	1–2
Busan IPark	4–6	Suwon FC	2–1	2–5 (a.e.t.)

6 December 2023
19:00 UTC+9

Gimpo FC	0–0	Gangwon FC
	Report

Gimpo Solteo Football Field, Gimpo
Attendance: 3,736
Referee: Jeong Dong-sik
9 December 2023
14:00 UTC+9

Gangwon FC	2–1	Gimpo FC
Vitor Gabriel 51', 76'	Report	Cho Sung-gwon 59'

Gangneung Stadium, Gangneung
Attendance: 10,130
Referee: Lee Dong-jun

Gangwon FC won 2–1 on aggregate and therefore both clubs remain in their respective leagues.

6 December 2023
19:00 UTC+9

Busan IPark	2–1	Suwon FC
Bruno Lamas 85' (pen.), 90+9' (pen.)	Report	Jang Jae-woong 43'

Busan Asiad Main Stadium, Busan
Attendance: 4,047
Referee: Ko Hyung-jin
9 December 2023
14:00 UTC+9

Suwon FC	5–2 (a.e.t.)	Busan IPark
Kim Hyun 79'; Lee Yeong-jae 86'; Lee Gwang-hyeok 96'; Jung Jae-yong 101'; Ricardo Lopes 118'	Report	Choi Jun 16'; Kim Jeong-hwan 115'

Suwon Sports Complex, Suwon
Attendance: 6,987
Referee: Kim Jong-hyeok

Suwon FC won 6–4 on aggregate and therefore both clubs remain in their respective leagues.

== Statistics ==
=== Top goalscorers ===
Rank	Player	Team	Goals
1	(Colombia) Luis Mina	Gimpo FC	16
2	(Brazil) Valdívia	Jeonnam Dragons	14
3	(South Korea) Cho Young-wook	Gimcheon Sangmu	13
3	(Brazil) Gleyson	Gyeongnam FC	13
3	(Brazil) Jorge Teixeira	Chungbuk Cheongju	13
6	(South Korea) An Jae-jun	Bucheon FC 1995	11
7	(South Korea) Won Ki-jong	Gyeongnam FC	10
7	(Brazil) Bruno Lamas	Busan IPark	10
7	(Brazil) Bruno Mota	Cheonan City	10
10	(South Korea) Yun Ju-tae	Ansan Greeners	9

=== Top assist providers ===
Rank	Player	Team	Assists
1	(Brazil) Valdívia	Jeonnam Dragons	14
2	(South Korea) Joo Hyeon-woo	FC Anyang	9
3	(Brazil) Andrigo	FC Anyang	8
3	(Brazil) Bruno Lamas	Busan IPark	8
5	(Brazil) Yago	FC Anyang	7
5	(Kosovo) Leonard Pllana	Jeonnam Dragons	7
7	(South Korea) Mo Jae-hyeon	Gyeongnam FC	6
8	10 Players		5

== Awards ==
=== Weekly awards ===
Round	Player of the Round	
Round	Player	Club
1	(Brazil) Jorge Teixeira	Chungbuk Cheongju
2	(Brazil) Guilherme Castro	Gyeongnam FC
3	(Brazil) Valdívia	Jeonnam Dragons
4	(Colombia) Luis Mina	Gimpo FC
5	(France) Christy Manzinga	Seongnam FC
6	(South Korea) Park Jae-yong	FC Anyang
7	(Colombia) Luis Mina	Gimpo FC
8	(South Korea) Park Se-jik	Chungnam Asan
9	(South Korea) An Jae-jun	Bucheon FC 1995
10	(Uruguay) Pablo González	Gimpo FC
11	(South Korea) Kim Min-jun	Gimcheon Sangmu
12	(South Korea) Lee Jung-bin	Bucheon FC 1995
13	(South Korea) Chang Hyuk-jin	Chungbuk Cheongju
14	(South Korea) Kim Chan	Busan IPark
15	(South Korea) An Jae-jun	Bucheon FC 1995
16	(Brazil) Jorge Teixeira	Chungbuk Cheongju
17	(Brazil) Jorge Teixeira	Chungbuk Cheongju
18	(South Korea) Kim Jeong-hyun	FC Anyang
19	(Brazil) Gleyson	Gyeongnam FC
20	(Brazil) Gleyson	Gyeongnam FC

Round	Player of the Round	
Round	Player	Club
21	(South Korea) Jin Seong-uk	Seongnam FC
22	(Brazil) Valdívia	Jeonnam Dragons
23	(Brazil) Paulo Henrique	Cheonan City
24	(Brazil) Gabriel Honório	Seongnam FC
25	(South Korea) Cho Young-wook	Gimcheon Sangmu
26	(South Korea) Lee Joon-suk	Gimcheon Sangmu
27	(South Korea) Ha Nam	Jeonnam Dragons
28	(Brazil) Gabriel Honório	Seongnam FC
29	(Colombia) Luis Mina	Gimpo FC
30	(Brazil) Juninho Rocha	Gimpo FC
31	(South Korea) Yoo Ji-ha	Jeonnam Dragons
32	(South Korea) Moon Jung-in	Seoul E-Land
33	(South Korea) Jung Chi-in	Gimcheon Sangmu
34	(South Korea) Kang Hyun-muk	Gimcheon Sangmu
35	(Kosovo) Leonard Pllana	Jeonnam Dragons
36	(South Korea) Choe Byeong-chan	Gimcheon Sangmu
37	(Brazil) Valdívia	Jeonnam Dragons
38	(South Korea) Park Tae-yong	Jeonnam Dragons
39	(South Korea) An Jae-jun	Bucheon FC 1995

=== Monthly awards ===
Month	Manager of the Month		
Month	Manager	Club	Division
February/March	(South Korea) Hong Myung-bo	Ulsan Hyundai	1
April	(South Korea) Ko Jeong-woon	Gimpo FC	2
May	(South Korea) Nam Ki-il	Jeju United	1
June	(South Korea) Lee Jung-hyo	Gwangju FC	1
July	(South Korea) Jo Sung-hwan	Incheon United	1
August	(South Korea) Choi Yun-kyum	Chungbuk Cheongju	2
September	(South Korea) Park Jin-sub	Busan IPark	2
October–December	(South Korea) Chung Jung-yong	Gimcheon Sangmu	2

=== Annual awards ===
The 2023 K League Awards was held on 4 December 2023.

Award	Winner	Club
Most Valuable Player	(Brazil) Valdívia	Jeonnam Dragons
Young Player of the Year	(South Korea) An Jae-jun	Bucheon FC 1995
Top goalscorer	(Colombia) Luis Mina	Gimpo FC
Top assist provider	(Brazil) Valdívia	Jeonnam Dragons
Manager of the Year	(South Korea) Ko Jeong-woon	Gimpo FC

Position	Best XI			
Goalkeeper	(South Korea) Koo Sang-min (Busan)			
Defenders	(South Korea) Choi Jun (Busan)	(South Korea) Lee Sang-min (Gimcheon)	(South Korea) Lee Han-do (Busan)	(South Korea) Kim Dong-jin (Anyang)
Midfielders	(South Korea) Mo Jae-hyeon (Gyeongnam)	(South Korea) Won Du-jae (Gimcheon)	(Brazil) Valdívia (Jeonnam)	(South Korea) Kim Jin-gyu (Gimcheon)
Forwards	(Brazil) Jorge Teixeira (Chungbuk Cheongju)		(Colombia) Luis Mina (Gimpo)	

== Attendance ==
Attendants who entered with free ticket were not counted.

Pos	Team	Total	High	Low	Average	Change
1	Seoul E-Land	65,109	7,266	1,350	3,617	+213.2%
2	Busan IPark	64,587	13,340	1,306	3,588	+144.4%
3	Gyeongnam FC	59,612	7,547	820	3,312	+261.6%
4	FC Anyang	54,484	6,003	1,539	3,027	+93.7%
5	Bucheon FC 1995	53,737	6,103	1,380	2,985	+137.7%
6	Chungbuk Cheongju	45,177	7,035	762	2,510	n/a
7	Chungnam Asan	39,852	7,546	515	2,214	+47.4%
8	Gimpo FC	38,911	3,121	1,164	2,162	+74.6%
9	Seongnam FC	37,744	7,789	647	2,097	+11.0%^{†}
10	Jeonnam Dragons	37,321	4,890	1,032	2,073	+91.9%
11	Gimcheon Sangmu	21,305	2,825	359	1,184	−22.2%^{†}
12	Ansan Greeners	21,164	4,173	385	1,176	+1.7%
13	Cheonan City	20,818	3,299	566	1,157	n/a
	League total	559,794	13,340	359	2,392	+76.4%

Source: K League
Notes:
^{†} Team played previous season in K League 1.

== See also ==
- 2023 in South Korean football
- 2023 Korean FA Cup
