= 2022 EAFF E-1 Football Championship Final squads =

The following is a list of squads for each nation competing in the 2022 EAFF E-1 Football Championship, held from 19 to 27 July in the cities of Kashima and Toyota, Japan. Each nation needed to submit a squad of 26 players, including 3 goalkeepers.

Age, caps and goals as of one day previous to the start of the tournament, 18 July 2022.

== China ==
Head coach: (Serbia) Aleksandar Janković

No.	Pos.	Player	Date of birth (age)	Caps	Goals	Club
1	GK	Han Jiaqi	3 July 1999 (aged 23)	0	0	(Chinese Football Association) Guangzhou City
12	GK	Peng Peng	24 November 2000 (aged 21)	0	0	(Chinese Football Association) Kunshan
25	GK	Huang Zihao	9 June 2001 (aged 21)	0	0	(Chinese Football Association) Nanjing City
2	DF	Yeljan Shinar	6 June 1999 (aged 23)	0	0	(Chinese Football Association) Shenzhen
3	DF	Wu Shaocong	20 March 2000 (aged 22)	0	0	(Chinese Football Association) Guangzhou
4	DF	Jiang Shenglong	24 December 2000 (aged 21)	0	0	(Chinese Football Association) Shanghai Shenhua
5	DF	Zhu Chenjie (captain)	23 August 2000 (aged 21)	14	1	(Chinese Football Association) Shanghai Shenhua
6	DF	Jiang Guangtai	27 May 1994 (aged 28)	11	0	(Chinese Football Association) Guangzhou
16	DF	Wen Jiabao	2 January 1999 (aged 23)	0	0	(Chinese Football Association) Shanghai Shenhua
17	DF	Xu Haofeng	27 January 1999 (aged 23)	0	0	(Chinese Football Association) Shenzhen
18	DF	He Yupeng	5 December 1999 (aged 22)	0	0	(Chinese Football Association) Dalian Pro
24	DF	Su Shihao	29 December 1999 (aged 22)	0	0	(Chinese Football Association) Qingdao Youth Island
8	MF	Dai Wai Tsun	25 July 1999 (aged 22)	4	0	(Chinese Football Association) Shenzhen
13	MF	Xu Yue	10 November 1999 (aged 22)	0	0	(Chinese Football Association) Shenzhen
15	MF	Dilyimit Tudi	25 February 1999 (aged 23)	0	0	(Chinese Football Association) Changchun Yatai
19	MF	Huang Jiahui	7 October 2000 (aged 21)	0	0	(Chinese Football Association) Dalian Pro
23	MF	Liang Shaowen	12 June 2002 (aged 20)	0	0	(Chinese Football Association) Beijing Guoan
7	FW	Tao Qianglong	20 November 2001 (aged 20)	0	0	(Chinese Football Association) Wuhan Three Towns
11	FW	Tan Long	1 April 1988 (aged 34)	7	1	(Chinese Football Association) Changchun Yatai
14	FW	Chen Guokang	23 January 1999 (aged 23)	0	0	(Chinese Football Association) Meizhou Hakka
20	FW	Fang Hao	3 January 2000 (aged 22)	0	0	(Chinese Football Association) Shandong Taishan
21	FW	Yao Xuchen	11 September 1999 (aged 22)	0	0	(Chinese Football Association) Hebei
22	FW	Liu Zhurun	6 October 2001 (aged 20)	0	0	(Chinese Football Association) Shanghai Port
26	FW	Liu Ruofan	28 January 1999 (aged 23)	0	0	(Chinese Football Association) Shanghai Shenhua

== Hong Kong ==
Head coach: (Norway) Jørn Andersen

No.	Pos.	Player	Date of birth (age)	Caps	Goals	Club
1	GK	Ng Wai Him	30 June 2002 (aged 20)	0	0	(Football Association of Hong Kong, China) Southern
18	GK	Paulo Cesar	27 March 1986 (aged 36)	1	0	(Football Association of Hong Kong, China) Kitchee
19	GK	Chan Ka Ho	27 January 1996 (aged 26)	0	0	(Football Association of Hong Kong, China) Lee Man
2	DF	Leung Nok Hang	14 November 1994 (aged 27)	5	0	(Chinese Football Association) Zhejiang Pro
3	DF	Tsui Wang Kit	5 January 1997 (aged 25)	14	0	(Football Association of Hong Kong, China) Lee Man
4	DF	Tomas Maronesi	7 April 1985 (aged 37)	1	0	(Football Association of Hong Kong, China) Kitchee
5	DF	Sean Tse (captain)	3 May 1992 (aged 30)	3	0	Free Agent
7	DF	Law Tsz Chun	2 March 1997 (aged 25)	12	0	(Football Association of Hong Kong, China) Kitchee
12	DF	Leung Kwun Chung	1 April 1992 (aged 30)	4	0	(Football Association of Hong Kong, China) Eastern
13	DF	Lau Hok Ming	19 October 1995 (aged 26)	2	0	(Football Association of Hong Kong, China) Southern
15	DF	Fung Hing Wa	12 December 1992 (aged 29)	7	0	(Football Association of Hong Kong, China) Lee Man
20	DF	Yiu Ho Ming	1 May 1995 (aged 27)	0	0	(Football Association of Hong Kong, China) Rangers
21	DF	Yue Tze Nam	12 May 1998 (aged 24)	5	0	(Football Association of Hong Kong, China) Eastern
22	DF	Vas Nuñez	22 November 1995 (aged 26)	0	0	(Chinese Football Association) Meizhou Hakka
26	DF	Tsang Yi Hang	27 October 2003 (aged 18)	0	0	(Football Association of Hong Kong, China) Kitchee
6	MF	Tan Chun Lok	15 January 1996 (aged 26)	30	2	(Chinese Football Association) Guangzhou City
8	MF	Wu Chun Ming	21 November 1997 (aged 24)	3	0	(Football Association of Hong Kong, China) Eastern
10	MF	Wong Wai	17 September 1992 (aged 29)	32	2	(Football Association of Hong Kong, China) Lee Man
11	MF	Cheng Chin Lung	7 January 1998 (aged 24)	3	0	(Football Association of Hong Kong, China) Kitchee
24	MF	Ju Yingzhi	24 July 1987 (aged 34)	34	4	(Football Association of Hong Kong, China) Southern
25	MF	Sohgo Ichikawa	30 July 2004 (aged 17)	0	0	(Football Association of Hong Kong, China) Kitchee
9	FW	Matt Orr	1 January 1997 (aged 25)	7	3	(Football Association of Hong Kong, China) Kitchee
14	FW	Yu Joy Yin	8 October 2001 (aged 20)	1	0	(Football Association of Hong Kong, China) Rangers
16	FW	Cheng Siu Kwan	13 January 1997 (aged 25)	8	0	(Football Association of Hong Kong, China) Lee Man
17	FW	Jahangir Khan	3 October 2000 (aged 21)	4	0	(Football Association of Hong Kong, China) Southern
23	FW	Sun Ming Him	19 June 2000 (aged 22)	10	1	(Football Association of Hong Kong, China) Eastern

== Japan ==
Head coach: Hajime Moriyasu

No.	Pos.	Player	Date of birth (age)	Caps	Goals	Club
1	GK	Keisuke Osako	28 July 1999 (aged 22)	2	0	(Japan Football Association) Sanfrecce Hiroshima
12	GK	Kosei Tani	22 November 2000 (aged 21)	0	0	(Japan Football Association) Shonan Bellmare
23	GK	Zion Suzuki	22 August 2002 (aged 19)	0	0	(Japan Football Association) Urawa Red Diamonds
2	DF	Miki Yamane	22 December 1993 (aged 28)	12	2	(Japan Football Association) Kawasaki Frontale
3	DF	Shogo Taniguchi (captain)	15 July 1991 (aged 31)	10	0	(Japan Football Association) Kawasaki Frontale
4	DF	Shinnosuke Nakatani	24 March 1996 (aged 26)	3	0	(Japan Football Association) Nagoya Grampus
5	DF	Shinnosuke Hatanaka	25 August 1995 (aged 26)	8	0	(Japan Football Association) Yokohama F. Marinos
13	DF	Daiki Sugioka	8 September 1998 (aged 23)	3	0	(Japan Football Association) Shonan Bellmare
19	DF	Sho Sasaki (vice-captain)	2 October 1989 (aged 32)	13	1	(Japan Football Association) Sanfrecce Hiroshima
22	DF	Hayato Araki	7 August 1996 (aged 25)	0	0	(Japan Football Association) Sanfrecce Hiroshima
24	DF	Takuma Ominami	13 December 1997 (aged 24)	0	0	(Japan Football Association) Kashiwa Reysol
25	DF	Ryuta Koike	29 August 1995 (aged 26)	0	0	(Japan Football Association) Yokohama F. Marinos
6	MF	Tomoki Iwata	7 April 1997 (aged 25)	2	0	(Japan Football Association) Yokohama F. Marinos
7	MF	Gakuto Notsuda	6 June 1994 (aged 28)	0	0	(Japan Football Association) Sanfrecce Hiroshima
8	MF	Tsukasa Morishima	25 April 1997 (aged 25)	2	0	(Japan Football Association) Sanfrecce Hiroshima
14	MF	Yasuto Wakizaka	11 June 1995 (aged 27)	1	0	(Japan Football Association) Kawasaki Frontale
15	MF	Kento Hashimoto	16 August 1993 (aged 28)	13	1	(Royal Spanish Football Federation) Huesca
21	MF	Makoto Mitsuta	20 July 1999 (aged 22)	0	0	(Japan Football Association) Sanfrecce Hiroshima
26	MF	Joel Chima Fujita	16 February 2002 (aged 20)	0	0	(Japan Football Association) Yokohama F. Marinos
9	FW	Takuma Nishimura	22 October 1996 (aged 25)	0	0	(Japan Football Association) Yokohama F. Marinos
10	FW	Yuto Iwasaki	11 June 1998 (aged 24)	0	0	(Japan Football Association) Sagan Tosu
11	FW	Shuto Machino	30 September 1999 (aged 22)	0	0	(Japan Football Association) Shonan Bellmare
16	FW	Yuki Soma	25 February 1997 (aged 25)	3	0	(Japan Football Association) Nagoya Grampus
17	FW	Ryo Miyaichi	14 December 1992 (aged 29)	2	0	(Japan Football Association) Yokohama F. Marinos
18	FW	Kota Mizunuma	22 February 1990 (aged 32)	0	0	(Japan Football Association) Yokohama F. Marinos
20	FW	Mao Hosoya	7 September 2001 (aged 20)	0	0	(Japan Football Association) Kashiwa Reysol

== South Korea ==
Head coach: (Portugal) Paulo Bento

No.	Pos.	Player	Date of birth (age)	Caps	Goals	Club
1	GK	Kim Dong-jun	19 December 1994 (aged 27)	0	0	(Korea Football Association) Jeju United
12	GK	Song Bum-keun	15 October 1997 (aged 24)	0	0	(Korea Football Association) Jeonbuk Hyundai Motors
21	GK	Jo Hyeon-woo	25 September 1991 (aged 30)	21	0	(Korea Football Association) Ulsan Hyundai
2	DF	Yoon Jong-gyu	20 March 1998 (aged 24)	1	0	(Korea Football Association) FC Seoul
3	DF	Kim Jin-su (captain)	13 June 1992 (aged 30)	57	2	(Korea Football Association) Jeonbuk Hyundai Motors
4	DF	Cho Yu-min	17 November 1996 (aged 25)	0	0	(Korea Football Association) Daejeon Hana Citizen
14	DF	Hong Chul (vice-captain)	17 September 1990 (aged 31)	43	0	(Korea Football Association) Daegu FC
15	DF	Kim Moon-hwan	1 August 1995 (aged 26)	17	0	(Korea Football Association) Jeonbuk Hyundai Motors
18	DF	Park Ji-soo	13 June 1994 (aged 28)	11	0	(Korea Football Association) Gimcheon Sangmu
19	DF	Lee Jae-ik	21 May 1999 (aged 23)	0	0	(Korea Football Association) Seoul E-Land
20	DF	Kwon Kyung-won	31 January 1992 (aged 30)	23	2	(Japan Football Association) Gamba Osaka
24	DF	Kim Ju-sung	12 December 2000 (aged 21)	0	0	(Korea Football Association) Gimcheon Sangmu
5	MF	Lee Yeong-jae	13 September 1994 (aged 27)	3	0	(Korea Football Association) Gimcheon Sangmu
6	MF	Hwang In-beom	20 September 1996 (aged 25)	34	4	(Korea Football Association) FC Seoul
7	MF	Na Sang-ho	12 August 1996 (aged 25)	19	2	(Korea Football Association) FC Seoul
8	MF	Paik Seung-ho	17 March 1997 (aged 25)	10	2	(Korea Football Association) Jeonbuk Hyundai Motors
10	MF	Kim Jin-gyu	24 February 1997 (aged 25)	5	2	(Korea Football Association) Jeonbuk Hyundai Motors
11	MF	Um Won-sang	6 January 1999 (aged 23)	5	0	(Korea Football Association) Ulsan Hyundai
13	MF	Song Min-kyu	12 September 1999 (aged 22)	9	0	(Korea Football Association) Jeonbuk Hyundai Motors
16	MF	Kim Dong-hyun	11 June 1997 (aged 25)	1	0	(Korea Football Association) Gangwon FC
22	MF	Kwon Chang-hoon	30 June 1994 (aged 28)	37	11	(Korea Football Association) Gimcheon Sangmu
23	MF	Goh Young-joon	9 July 2001 (aged 21)	0	0	(Korea Football Association) Pohang Steelers
25	MF	Lee Ki-hyuk	7 July 2000 (aged 22)	0	0	(Korea Football Association) Suwon FC
26	MF	Kang Seong-jin	26 March 2003 (aged 19)	0	0	(Korea Football Association) FC Seoul
9	FW	Cho Gue-sung	25 January 1998 (aged 24)	12	3	(Korea Football Association) Gimcheon Sangmu
17	FW	Cho Young-wook	5 February 1999 (aged 23)	2	1	(Korea Football Association) FC Seoul
