= Kim Jin-su =

South Korean footballer (born 1992)

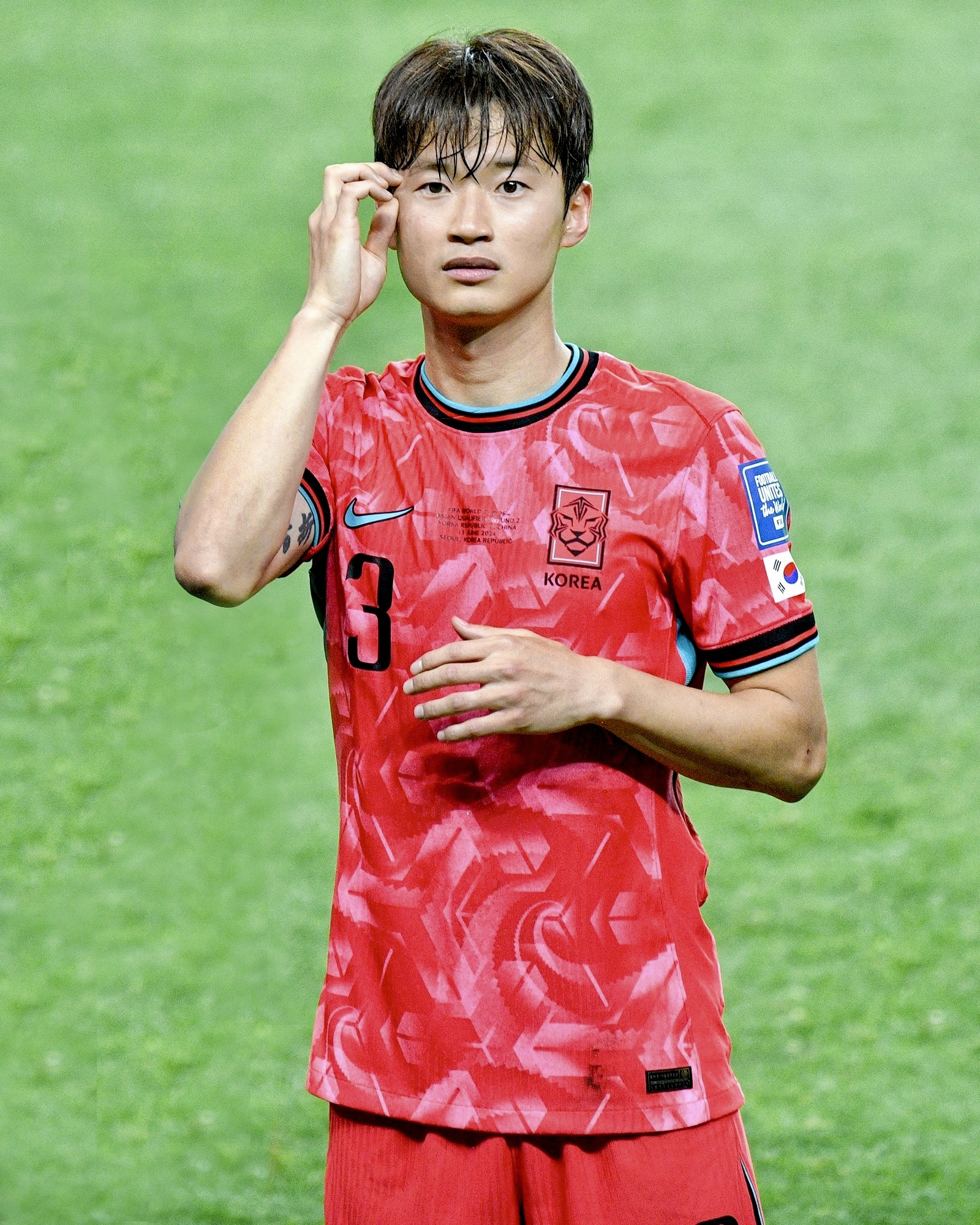
- Kim in 2024

Personal information
- Full name: Kim Jin-su
- Date of birth: 13 June 1992 (age 34)
- Place of birth: Jeonju, Jeonbuk, South Korea
- Height: 1.77 m (5 ft 10 in)
- Position: Left-back

Team information
- Current team: FC Seoul
- Number: 22

Youth career
- 2008–2011: Yongin FC
- 2011–2012: Kyung Hee University

Senior career*
Years	Team	Apps	(Gls)
2012–2014	Albirex Niigata	66	(1)
2014–2016	TSG Hoffenheim	34	(0)
2017–2020	Jeonbuk Hyundai Motors	78	(7)
2020–2023	Al Nassr	7	(0)
2021–2023	→ Jeonbuk Hyundai Motors (loan)	53	(2)
2023–2024	Jeonbuk Hyundai Motors	29	(0)
2025–	FC Seoul	68	(3)

International career^{‡}
2007–2009	South Korea U17	31	(4)
2010–2011	South Korea U20	10	(0)
2014	South Korea U23	7	(1)
2013–2024	South Korea	74	(2)
Medal record
Men's football
Representing South Korea
AFC Asian Cup
Runner-up	2015 Australia
Asian Games
Gold medal – first place	2014 Incheon	Team
EAFF Championship
Winner	2017 Japan	Team
Winner	2019 South Korea	Team
Runner-up	2022 Japan	Team
- * Club domestic league appearances and goals as of 24 October 2026 ‡ National team caps and goals as of 11 June 2024

- Kim Jin-su
- Hangul: 김진수
- Hanja: 金珍洙
- RR: Gim Jinsu
- MR: Kim Chinsu
- IPA: [kim.dʑin.su] or [kim] [tɕin.su]

Kim Jin-su (Korean: 김진수; born 13 June 1992) is a South Korean professional footballer who plays as a left-back for K League 1 club FC Seoul.

== Early life ==
Kim was born in Jeonju.

== Club career ==
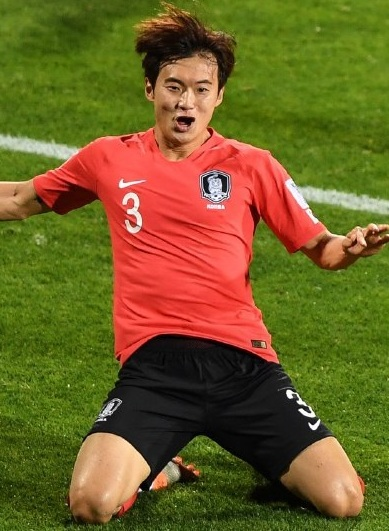
Kim playing for South Korea at the 2019 AFC Asian Cup

On 13 January 2012, Albirex Niigata announced the signing of Kim Jin-su. On 19 February 2012, Kim made his professional debut against Vissel Kobe in a pre-season friendly match, which Albirex won 3–0. Furthermore, he scored his first professional goal in the same match, with a long range strike.

He made his competitive debut in a J1 League match against Kawasaki Frontale on 10 March 2012, playing the full 90 minutes.

On his birthday in 2014, TSG Hoffenheim announced the signing of Kim Jin-su. Later on, he returned to Korea to play for Jeonbuk Hyundai Motors in 2017.

In 2020, he signed for Saudi club Al-Nassr.

== International career ==
Kim has represented South Korea at many youth levels. He had participated in the 2009 FIFA U-17 World Cup and the 2011 FIFA U-20 World Cup.

=== 2013 EAFF East Asian Cup ===
On 20 July 2013, Kim made his debut for the South Korea senior team against Australia in a 0–0 draw. And South Korea ended in third place.

=== 2014 Asian Games ===
Kim was selected for the football tournament at the 2014 Asian Games which was hosted by Korea Republic. His team won the final match in a 1–0 against North Korea, which guaranteed the entire squad's exemption from mandatory military service.

=== 2018 World Cup ===
In May 2018 he was named in South Korea’s preliminary 28 man squad for the 2018 World Cup in Russia. Kim Jin-su, who was uncertain about the 2018 World Cup finals due to injuries, was pushed out of the final competition for the 2018 World Cup in Russia.

=== 2017 & 2019 EAFF E-1 Football Championship ===
Kim Jin-su was selected to play in both 2017 and 2019 EAFF E-1 Football Championship. He played in both final matches which led them win the first place.

=== 2019 AFC Asian Cup ===
In round 16 match, he scored a goal in 2–1 victory against Bahrain in overtime and the team advanced to quarter-final which later eliminated by Qatar, the eventual champion of 2019 AFC Asian Cup.

=== 2022 World Cup ===
In 2022 FIFA World Cup, Kim Jin-su played full-time in all group stage matches and played in a last match against Brazil. He did an excellent job in the match against Uruguay. Despite being a goalless draw, there were plenty of good performances from his team and Kim Jin-su stood out. The 30-year-old veteran defender was impressive both offensively and defensively during the game. Overall, he made three tackles, one clearance, won five ground duels, four aerial duels and completed three crosses in the match. He also assisted the second goal to Cho Gue-sung in a second match against Ghana on 28 November. Despite exit from the world cup, his team successfully advanced to the round of 16 which was achieved after 12 years.

== Career statistics ==
=== Club ===
As of match played 24 October 2026

Appearances and goals by club, season and competition
Club	Season	League			National cup (Note: Includes Emperor's Cup, DFB-Pokal, Korean FA Cup, King's Cup)		League cup (Note: Includes J.League Cup)		Continental		Total	
Club	Season	Division	Apps	Goals	Apps	Goals	Apps	Goals	Apps	Goals	Apps	Goals
Albirex Niigata	2012	J1 League	23	1	1	0	4	0	—		28	1
Albirex Niigata	2013	J1 League	31	0	1	1	4	0	—		36	1
Albirex Niigata	2014	J1 League	12	0	—		2	1	—		14	1
Albirex Niigata	Total		66	1	2	1	10	1	—		78	3
TSG Hoffenheim	2014–15	Bundesliga	19	0	2	0	—		—		21	0
TSG Hoffenheim	2015–16	Bundesliga	15	0	0	0	—		—		15	0
TSG Hoffenheim	2016–17	Bundesliga	0	0	0	0	—		—		0	0
TSG Hoffenheim	Total		34	0	2	0	—		—		36	0
Jeonbuk Hyundai Motors	2017	K League 1	29	4	1	0	—		—		30	4
Jeonbuk Hyundai Motors	2018	K League 1	7	1	0	0	—		4 (Note: Appearances in AFC Champions League)	2	11	3
Jeonbuk Hyundai Motors	2019	K League 1	27	2	0	0	—		7	0	34	2
Jeonbuk Hyundai Motors	2020	K League 1	15	0	2	0	—		2	0	19	0
Jeonbuk Hyundai Motors	Total		78	7	3	0	—		13	2	94	9
Al-Nassr	2019–20	Saudi Pro League	0	0	2	0	—		0	0	2	0
Al-Nassr	2020–21	Saudi Pro League	7	0	1	0	—		0	0	8	0
Al-Nassr	Total		7	0	3	0	—		0	0	10	0
Jeonbuk Hyundai Motors (loan)	2021	K League 1	12	0	—		—		2	0	14	0
Jeonbuk Hyundai Motors (loan)	2022	K League 1	31	2	4	0	—		8	0	43	2
Jeonbuk Hyundai Motors (loan)	2023	K League 1	10	0	1	0	—		—		11	0
Jeonbuk Hyundai Motors (loan)	Total		53	2	5	0	—		10	0	68	2
Jeonbuk Hyundai Motors	2023	K League 1	9	0	2	0	—		5	0	16	0
Jeonbuk Hyundai Motors	2024	K League 1	20	0	1	0	—		4	0	25	0
Jeonbuk Hyundai Motors	Total		29	0	3	0	—		9	0	41	0
FC Seoul	2025	K League 1	37	2	1	0	—		4	0	42	2
FC Seoul	2026	K League 1	31	1	0	0	—		4	0	35	1
FC Seoul	Total		68	3	1	0	—		8	0	77	3
Career total			335	13	19	1	10	1	40	2	404	17

=== International ===
Scores and results list South Korea's goal tally first, score column indicates score after each Kim goal.

List of international goals scored by Kim Jin-su
No.	Date	Venue	Opponent	Score	Result	Competition
1	22 January 2019	Rashid Stadium, Dubai, United Arab Emirates	Bahrain	2–1	2–1 (a.e.t.)	2019 AFC Asian Cup
2	1 February 2022	Rashid Stadium, Dubai, United Arab Emirates	Syria	1–0	2–0	2022 FIFA World Cup qualification

== Honours ==
Jeonbuk Hyundai Motors

- K League 1: 2017, 2018, 2019, 2020, 2021
- Korean FA Cup: 2020, 2022

FC Seoul

- K League 1: 2026

South Korea U23

- Asian Games: 2014

South Korea

- EAFF E-1 Football Championship: 2017, 2019

Individual

- K League 1 Best XI: 2017, 2022
