= Andrigo =

Brazilian footballer (born 1995)

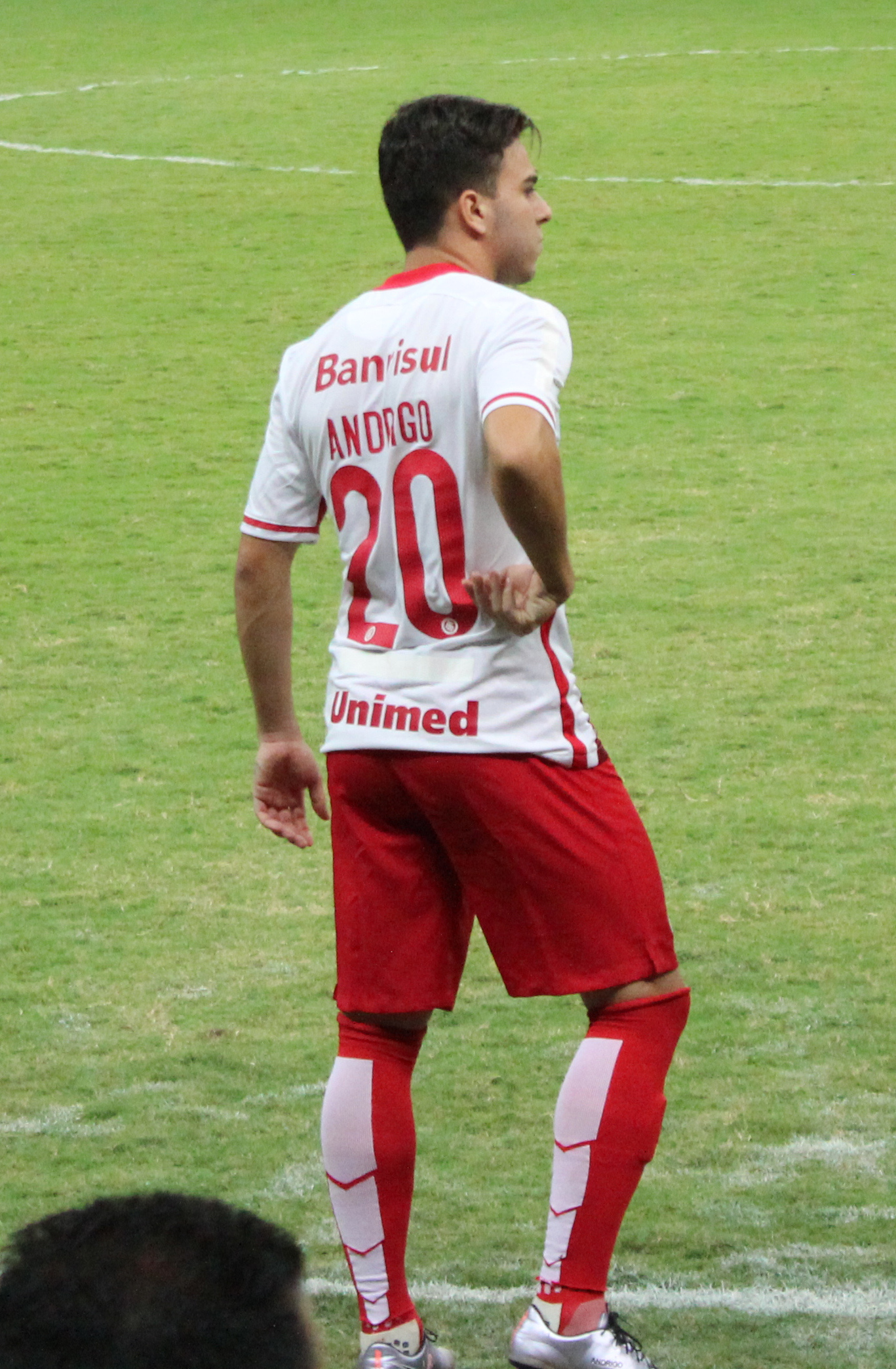

Personal information
- Full name: Andrigo Oliveira de Araújo
- Date of birth: February 27, 1995 (age 31)
- Place of birth: Estrela, Brazil
- Height: 1.70 m (5 ft 7 in)
- Position: Attacking midfielder

Team information
- Current team: Dibba
- Number: 7

Youth career
- Internacional

Senior career*
Years	Team	Apps	(Gls)
2014–2019	Internacional	37	(6)
2017	→ Atlético Goianiense (loan)	36	(5)
2018	→ Ceará (loan)	16	(6)
2018	→ Sport Recife (loan)	17	(0)
2019	→ Vitória (loan)	18	(2)
2019	→ Figueirense (loan)	17	(2)
2020–2021	CSA	29	(2)
2021	Guarani	45	(5)
2022–2023	FC Anyang	47	(13)
2023–2024	Chengdu Rongcheng	21	(5)
2024	→ Jeonbuk Hyundai Motors (loan)	15	(3)
2025	Jeonbuk Hyundai Motors	0	(0)
2025–2026	Suwon FC	16	(0)
2026–	Dibba	0	(0)

International career
2011	Brazil U17	6	(0)
- * Club domestic league appearances and goals as of 5 January 2026

Andrigo Oliveira de Araújo (born 27 February 1995), simply known as Andrigo, is a Brazilian footballer who plays as an attacking midfielder for UAE Pro League club Dibba.

== Club career ==
Born in Estrela, Rio Grande do Sul, Andrigo began his career at nearby Sport Club Internacional. He was first integrated into the first team at the end of the 2014 Campeonato Brasileiro Série A season, remaining an unused substitute in victories over Sociedade Esportiva Palmeiras and Figueirense FC. He was part of the team that won the year's Copa do Brasil Sub-20, scoring the first goal of a 2–1 home win over Esporte Clube Vitória in the final (4–2 aggregate).

On 6 December 2015, he made his professional debut on the final day of the season, replacing Alex for the final 14 minutes of a 2–0 win over Cruzeiro Esporte Clube at Beira-Rio and receiving a yellow card.

Andrigo scored his first senior goal on 20 February 2016 in that year's Campeonato Gaúcho, concluding a 4–0 home win over Esporte Clube Cruzeiro four minutes after replacing Eduardo Sasha. On 9 May 2017, after being sparingly used in Inter's first-ever relegation to Campeonato Brasileiro Série B, he was loaned to Atlético Goianiense until December.

In 2022, Andrigo joined FC Anyang of K League 2.

On 21 July 2023, Andrigo signed with Chinese Super League club Chengdu Rongcheng.

== International career ==
Andrigo played for Brazil's victorious under-17 team at the 2011 South American Under-17 Football Championship, starting twice in six appearances.

== Career statistics ==
As of match played 16 April 2025

Appearances and goals by club, season and competition
Club	Season	League			State League		National Cup		Continental		Other		Total	
Club	Season	Division	Apps	Goals	Apps	Goals	Apps	Goals	Apps	Goals	Apps	Goals	Apps	Goals
Internacional	2014	Série A	0	0	—		—		—		—		0	0
Internacional	2015	Série A	1	0	—		—		—		—		1	0
Internacional	2016	Série A	11	0	15	5	2	0	—		3	0	31	5
Internacional	2017	Série A	—		4	0	0	0	—		3	1	7	1
Internacional	Total		12	0	19	5	2	0	—		6	1	39	6
Atlético Goianiense (loan)	2017	Série A	36	4	—		—		—		—		36	4
Ceará (loan)	2018	Série A	—		8	4	4	0	—		4	2	16	6
Sport Recife (loan)	2018	Série A	17	0	—		—		—		—		17	0
Vitória (loan)	2019	Série B	3	0	7	1	1	0	—		7	1	18	2
Figueirense (loan)	2019	Série B	16	3	—		—		—		—		16	3
CSA	2020	Série B	25	2	3	0	—		—		—		28	2
CSA	2021	Série B	—		—		—		—		1	0	1	0
CSA	Total		25	2	3	0	—		—		1	0	29	2
Guarani	2021	Série B	34	1	11	4	—		—		—		45	5
FC Anyang	2022	K League 2	28	7	—		2	0	—		2	0	32	7
FC Anyang	2023	K League 2	19	6	—		0	0	—		—		19	6
FC Anyang	Total		47	13	—		2	0	—		2	0	51	13
Chengdu Rongcheng	2023	Chinese Super League	13	3	—		—		—		—		13	3
Chengdu Rongcheng	2024	Chinese Super League	9	2	—		0	0	—		—		9	2
Chengdu Rongcheng	Total		22	5	—		0	0	—		—		22	5
Jeonbuk Hyundai Motors (loan)	2024	K League 1	15	3	—		—		0	0	0	0	15	3
Jeonbuk Hyundai Motors	2025	K League 1	0	0	—		1	0	1	0	—		2	0
Career total			227	31	48	14	10	0	1	0	20	4	306	59

== Honours ==
Brazil U17

- South American Under-17 Football Championship: 2011
