= Lee Yeong-jae =

South Korean footballer (born 1994)

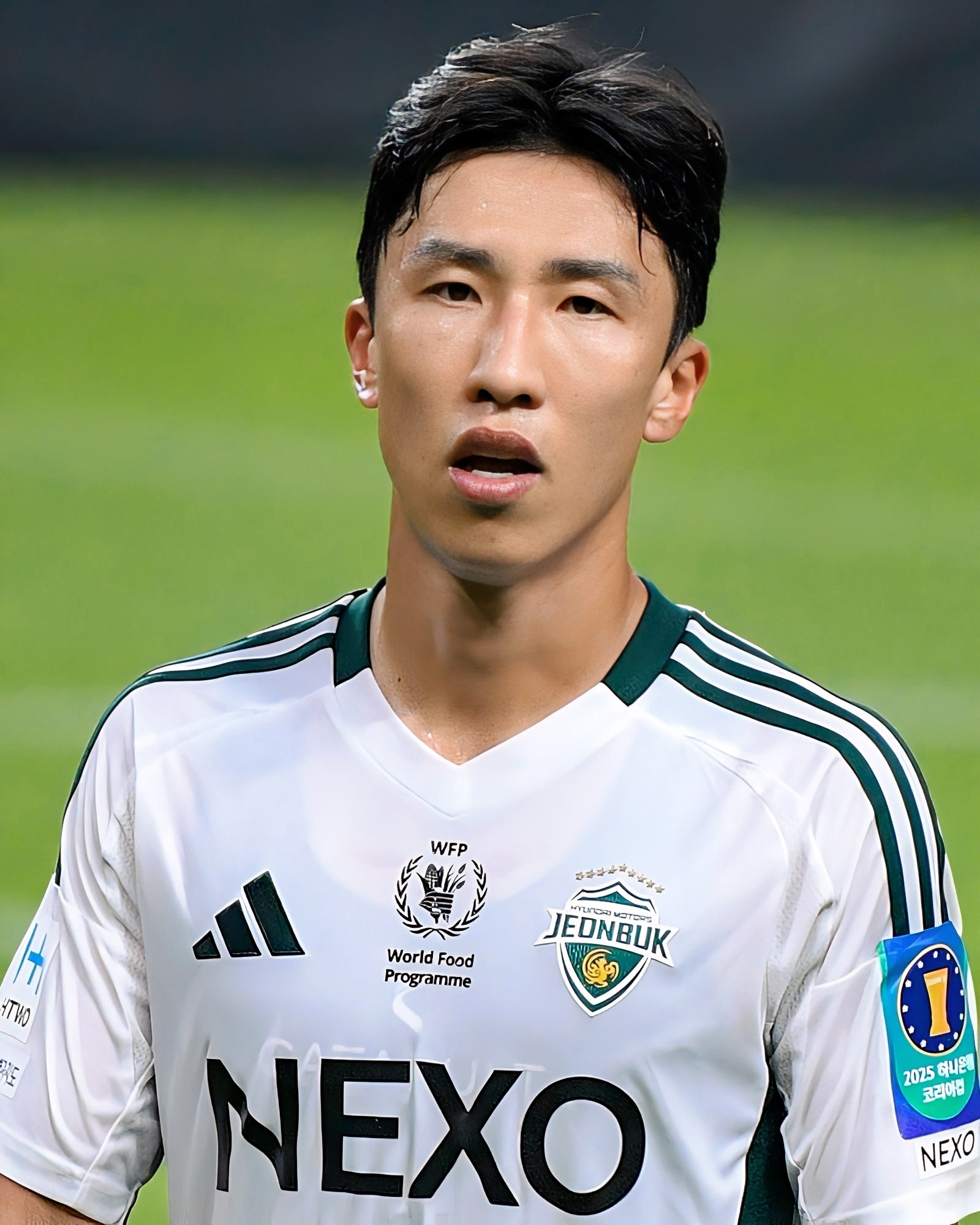
- Lee in 2025

Personal information
- Full name: Lee Yeong-jae
- Date of birth: 13 September 1994 (age 32)
- Place of birth: Seoul, South Korea
- Height: 1.75 m (5 ft 9 in)
- Position: Midfielder

Team information
- Current team: Jeonbuk Hyundai Motors
- Number: 28

Youth career
- –2015: Yongin University

Senior career*
| Years | Team | Apps | (Gls) |
| 2015–2018 | Ulsan Hyundai | 62 | (5) |
| 2016 | → Busan IPark (loan) | 17 | (1) |
| 2019 | Gyeongnam FC | 11 | (2) |
| 2019–2020 | Gangwon FC | 36 | (8) |
| 2021– 2023 | Suwon FC | 44 | (6) |
| 2022–2023 | → Gimcheon Sangmu (draft) | 50 | (4) |
| 2024– | Jeonbuk Hyundai Motors | 80 | (6) |

International career^{‡}
| 2014–2016 | South Korea U-23 | 20 | (4) |
| 2019– | South Korea | 5 | (0) |
Medal record
Men's football
Representing South Korea
EAFF Championship
| Winner | 2019 South Korea | Team |
| Runner-up | 2022 Japan | Team |
- * Club domestic league appearances and goals as of 3 August 2026 ‡ National team caps and goals as of 27 July 2022

- Lee Yeong-jae
- Hangul: 이영재
- Hanja: 李英才
- RR: I Yeongjae
- MR: I Yŏngjae

Lee Yeong-jae (Korean: 이영재; Hanja: 李英才; born 13 September 1994) is a South Korean football midfielder who plays for Jeonbuk Hyundai Motors and the South Korea national team.

== Club career ==
Lee joined Ulsan Hyundai in 2015 and made his league debut against Jeonnam Dragons on 5 July 2015. On 25 October 2015, he scored first goal against Jeonnam Dragons.

He moved to Busan IPark on loan on 8 February 2016.

== International career ==
He was a member of the South Korea national U-23 team for the 2015 King's Cup and 2016 AFC U-23 Championship. He has played 20 games and scored 4 goals for South Korea Olympics.

== Club career statistics ==
As of 6 December 2025

| Club performance | | | League | | Cup | | Continental | | Playoffs | | Total | |
| Season | Club | League | Apps | Goals | Apps | Goals | Apps | Goals | Apps | Goals | Apps | Goals |
| South Korea | | | League | | KFA Cup | | Asia | | Playoffs | | Total | |
|---|---|---|---|---|---|---|---|---|---|---|---|---|
| 2015 | Ulsan Hyundai | K League 1 | 10 | 1 | 0 | 0 | — | | — | | 10 | 1 |
| 2016 | Busan IPark (loan) | K League 2 | 17 | 1 | 2 | 1 | — | | — | | 19 | 2 |
| 2017 | Ulsan Hyundai | K League 1 | 30 | 2 | 6 | 1 | 5 | 0 | — | | 41 | 3 |
| 2018 | Ulsan Hyundai | K League 1 | 22 | 2 | 4 | 0 | 5 | 2 | — | | 31 | 4 |
| 2019 | Gyeongnam FC | K League 1 | 11 | 2 | 3 | 1 | 3 | 0 | — | | 17 | 3 |
| 2019 | Gangwon FC | K League 1 | 13 | 6 | — | | — | | — | | 13 | 6 |
| 2020 | Gangwon FC | K League 1 | 23 | 2 | 3 | 3 | — | | — | | 26 | 5 |
| 2021 | Suwon FC | K League 1 | 30 | 5 | 0 | 0 | — | | — | | 30 | 5 |
| 2022 | Gimcheon Sangmu (draft) | K League 1 | 37 | 3 | 1 | 0 | — | | 2 | 0 | 40 | 3 |
| 2023 | Gimcheon Sangmu (draft) | K League 2 | 13 | 1 | 0 | 0 | — | | — | | 13 | 1 |
| 2023 | Suwon FC | K League 1 | 14 | 1 | 0 | 0 | — | | 2 | 1 | 16 | 1 |
| 2024 | Jeonbuk Hyundai Motors | K League 1 | 34 | 4 | 1 | 0 | 4 | 1 | 2 | 0 | 40 | 4 |
| 2025 | Jeonbuk Hyundai Motors | K League 1 | 32 | 2 | 5 | 0 | 4 | 0 | — | | 41 | 2 |
| Total | South Korea | | 256 | 32 | 25 | 6 | 21 | 3 | 6 | 1 | 338 | 42 |
| Career total | | | 256 | 32 | 25 | 6 | 21 | 3 | 6 | 1 | 338 | 42 |

== Honours ==
=== Club ===
Ulsan Hyundai

- Korean FA Cup: 2017

Gimcheon Sangmu

- K League 2: 2023

Jeonbuk Hyundai Motors

- K League 1: 2025
- Korean FA Cup: 2025

=== International ===
South Korea U-23

- King's Cup: 2015

South Korea

- EAFF E-1 Football Championship: 2019
