= Gabriel Honório =

Brazilian footballer

Personal information
- Full name: Gabriel Honório Ramos
- Date of birth: 16 July 1996 (age 30)
- Place of birth: Paranaguá, Brazil
- Height: 1.84 m (6 ft 0 in)
- Position: Midfielder

Team information
- Current team: Busan IPark
- Number: 10

Senior career*
Years	Team	Apps	(Gls)
2018–2020	Rio Branco-PR	3	(0)
2018–2019	→ Criciúma (loan)	6	(0)
2019	→ Luverdense (loan)	14	(2)
2021	Vilafranquense	0	(0)
2021	Sampaio Corrêa	3	(0)
2021	Rio Branco-PR	13	(2)
2021–2022	São Joseense	12	(1)
2022	→ Londrina (loan)	1	(0)
2022	→ Vitória (loan)	11	(0)
2023	Ansan Greeners	18	(4)
2023–2024	Seongnam	17	(4)
2025	Brusque	9	(0)
2025	Botafogo-PB	17	(2)
2026–	Busan IPark	19	(6)
- * Club domestic league appearances and goals as of 5 August 2026

Gabriel Honório Ramos (born 16 July 1996), simply known as Gabriel Honório, is a Brazilian professional footballer who plays as midfielder for K League 2 club Busan IPark.

== Career ==
Born in Paranaguá, the Honório began his professional career at the age of 21, at the city club Rio Branco SC. With few opportunities, Honório also had loan spells at Criciúma and Luverdense during the period. In 2021 he was negotiated with UD Vilafranquense, but was not used by the Portuguese club. He returned to Brazilian football at Sampaio Corrêa, where he was part of the state champion squad, and later returned to a second pell at the Rio Branco-PR. He also played for Independente São Joseense, a team from the second division of Paraná that was promoted, where the player once again gained prominence for teams competing in national level.

In 2022 Honório played for Londrina and Vitória, and in 2023 he was traded to Ansan Greeners from K League 2. In July 2023, he transferred to Seongnan FC.

On 19 January 2025, Honório was announced as a reinforcement for Brusque FC. On march, he signed with Botafogo-PB.

== Honours ==
Sampaio Corrêa

- Campeonato Maranhense: 2021

Independente São Joseense

- Campeonato Paranaense Série Prata: 2021
