= Lee Jun-ho (footballer) =

South Korean footballer (born 1989)

Personal information
- Full name: Lee Jun-ho
- Date of birth: 27 January 1989 (age 37)
- Place of birth: South Korea
- Height: 1.80 m (5 ft 11 in)
- Position: Full back

Team information
- Current team: Suwon FC
- Number: 14

Youth career
- 2008–2011: Chung Ang University

Senior career*
| Years | Team | Apps | (Gls) |
| 2012 | Incheon United | 0 | (0) |
| 2013– | Suwon FC | 94 | (4) |
- * Club domestic league appearances and goals as of 12 January 2018

Lee Jun-ho (Korean: 이준호; born 27 January 1989) is a South Korean footballer who plays as full back for Suwon FC in K League 2.

== Career ==
Lee was selected by Incheon United in the 2012 K League draft, but he made no appearance at his first club.

He moved to K League Challenge side Suwon FC after the 2012 season.
