= Kim Jin-gyu (footballer, born 1997) =

South Korean footballer (born 1997)

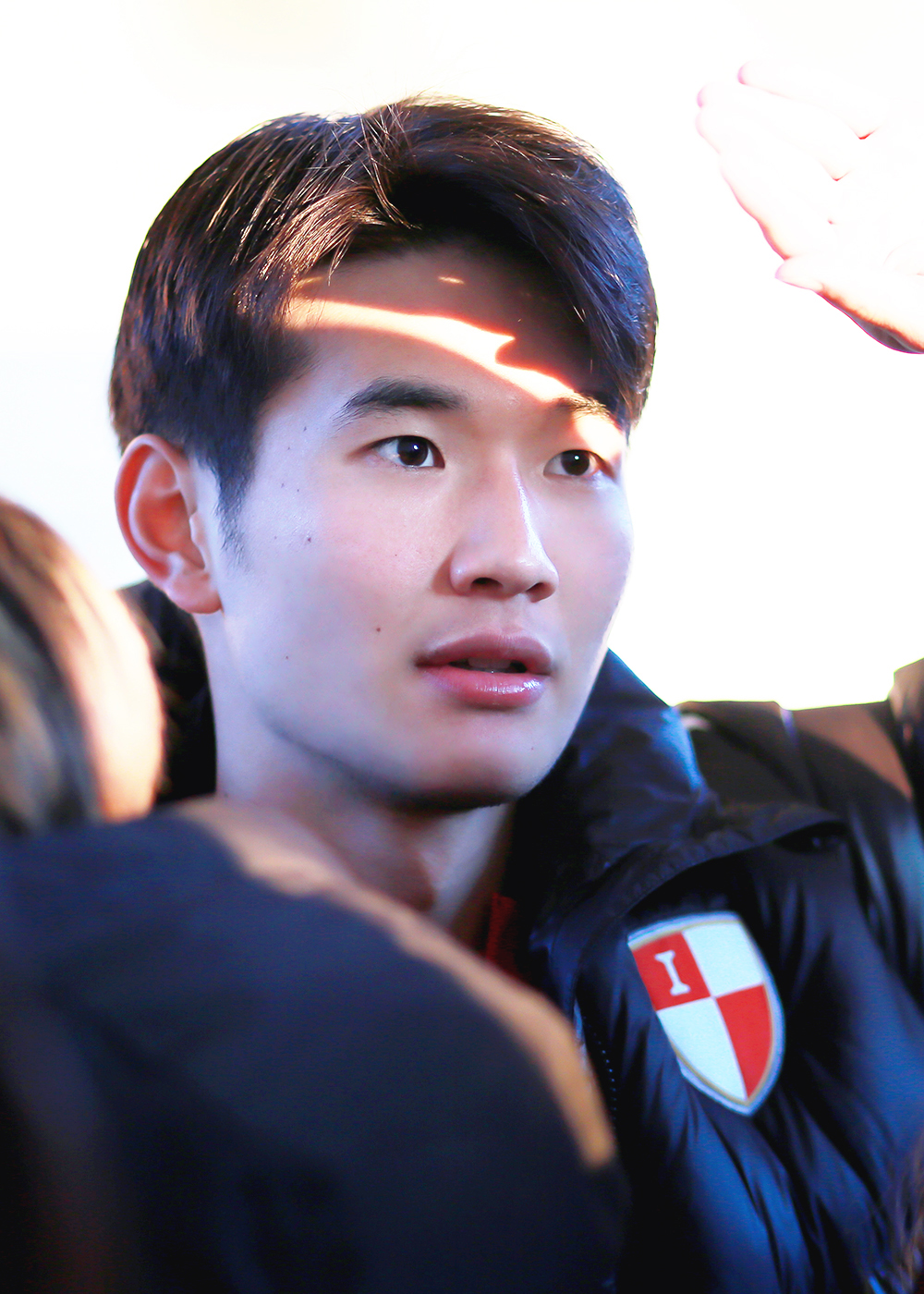
- Kim in December 2019

Personal information
- Full name: Kim Jin-gyu
- Date of birth: 24 February 1997 (age 29)
- Place of birth: Pohang, South Korea
- Height: 1.77 m (5 ft 9 1/2 in)
- Position: Midfielder

Team information
- Current team: Jeonbuk Hyundai Motors
- Number: 97

Youth career
- 2012–2015: Busan IPark

Senior career*
Years	Team	Apps	(Gls)
2015–2022	Busan IPark	128	(17)
2022–	Jeonbuk Hyundai Motors	106	(13)
2023–2024	→ Gimcheon Sangmu (draft)	47	(6)

International career^{‡}
2015	South Korea U20	3	(0)
2019–2021	South Korea U23	13	(1)
2022–	South Korea	24	(3)
Medal record
Men's football
Representing South Korea
EAFF Championship
Runner-up	2022 Japan	Team
AFC U-23 Championship
Gold medal – first place	2020 Thailand
Korean name
Hangul	김진규
Hanja	金鎮圭
RR	Gim Jingyu
MR	Kim Chin'gyu
IPA	[kim.d͡ʑin.ɡju]
- * Club domestic league appearances and goals as of 8 November 2026 ‡ National team caps and goals as of 24 June 2026

Kim Jin-gyu (Korean: 김진규; born 24 February 1997) is a South Korean footballer who plays as a midfielder for Jeonbuk Hyundai Motors and the South Korea national team.

== Club career ==
Kim signed a professional contract with Busan IPark in January 2015. Kim made his debut for the club on 4 July 2015 in a 1–0 defeat to Seongnam FC. He scored his professional debut goal on 27 July against Daejeon Citizens to become the youngest goal scorer in the K League 1.

Under Choi Yun-kyum in 2018, Kim featured regularly on the left side of a front three. However, Choi's replacement Cho Deok-je preferred to use Kim in central midfield. Under Cho, Kim was a regular for the side that went on to gain promotion to the K League 1.

On 17 March 2022, Jeonbuk Hyundai Motors announced the official signing of Kim. He made his debut game for Jeonbuk Hyundai Motors on 19 March 2022 in a draw against Gimcheon Sangmu.

== International career ==
In January 2020, Kim played for the South Korea U-23 team at the AFC U23 Championship. The team won the tournament to qualify for the 2020 Summer Olympics.

In July 2021, Kim was named in the final squad for the 2020 Summer Olympics. He made three appearances in South Korea's run to the quarter-finals.

He received a call-up from Myung-Bo Hong to join South Korea's squad for the 2026 FIFA World Cup.

== Career statistics ==
=== Club ===
As of 8 November 2026

Appearances and goals by club, season and competition
Club	Season	League			National cup		Continental		Other		Total	
Club	Season	Division	Apps	Goals	Apps	Goals	Apps	Goals	Apps	Goals	Apps	Goals
Busan IPark	2015	K League 1	14	1	0	0	—		1 (Note: Appearances in K League promotion-relegation playoffs)	0	15	1
Busan IPark	2016	K League 2	6	0	1	0	—		—		7	0
Busan IPark	2017	K League 2	10	0	2	1	—		—		12	1
Busan IPark	2018	K League 2	31	7	3	1	—		3	1	37	9
Busan IPark	2019	K League 2	31	4	1	0	—		3	0	35	4
Busan IPark	2020	K League 1	8	1	1	1	—		—		9	2
Busan IPark	2021	K League 2	27	4	0	0	—		—		27	4
Busan IPark	2022	K League 2	1	0	1	0	—		—		2	0
Busan IPark	Total		128	17	9	3	—		7	1	144	21
Jeonbuk Hyundai Motors	2022	K League 1	26	2	5	1	9 (Note: Appearances in AFC Champions League Elite)	1	—		40	4
Jeonbuk Hyundai Motors	2024	K League 1	14	4	0	0	—		2	0	16	4
Jeonbuk Hyundai Motors	2025	K League 1	35	5	5	0	4 (Note: Appearances in AFC Champions League Two)	0	—		44	5
Jeonbuk Hyundai Motors	2026	K League 1	31	2	0	0	4	0	1 (Note: Appearance in K League Super Cup)	0	36	2
Jeonbuk Hyundai Motors	Total		106	13	10	1	17	1	3	0	136	15
Gimcheon Sangmu (draft)	2023	K League 2	32	6	0	0	—		—		32	6
Gimcheon Sangmu (draft)	2024	K League 1	15	0	0	0	—		—		15	0
Gimcheon Sangmu (draft)	Total		47	6	0	0	—		—		47	6
Career total			281	36	19	4	17	1	10	1	327	42

=== International ===
Scores and results list South Korea's goal tally first, score column indicates score after each Kim goal.

List of international goals scored by Kim Jin-kyu
No.	Date	Venue	Opponent	Score	Result	Competition
1	15 January 2022	Mardan Sports Complex, Antalya, Turkey	Iceland	4–1	5–1	Friendly
2	21 January 2022	Mardan Sports Complex, Antalya, Turkey	Moldova	1–0	4–0	Friendly
3	5 June 2025	Basra International Stadium, Basra, Iraq	Iraq	1–0	2–0	2026 FIFA World Cup qualification

== Honours ==
Jeonbuk Hyundai Motors

- K League 1: 2025
- Korean FA Cup: 2022, 2025
- K League Super Cup: 2026

Gimcheon Sangmu

- K League 2: 2023

South Korea U23

- AFC U-23 Championship: 2020

Individual

- K League 2 Best XI: 2023
- K League 1 Best XI: 2025
