= 2015 Copa Libertadores second stage =

The 2015 Copa Libertadores second stage was played from February 17 to April 22, 2015. A total of 32 teams competed in the second stage to decide the 16 places in the final stages of the 2015 Copa Libertadores.

== Draw ==
The draw of the tournament was held on December 2, 2014, 21:00 UTC−3, at the CONMEBOL Convention Centre in Luque, Paraguay.

For the second stage, the 32 teams were drawn into eight groups of four containing one team from each of the four seeding pots. The seeding of each team was determined by their association and qualifying berth (as per the rotational agreement established by CONMEBOL, the teams which qualified through berths 1 from Colombia, Ecuador, Peru and Venezuela were seeded into Pot 1 for odd-numbered years, while the teams which qualified through berths 1 from Bolivia, Chile, Paraguay and Uruguay were seeded into Pot 1 for even-numbered years). Teams from the same association in Pots 1 and 2 could not be drawn into the same group. However, a first stage winner, whose identity was not known at the time of the draw, could be drawn into the same group with another team from the same association.

Pots for the second stage draw
Pot 1	Pot 2	Pot 3	Pot 4
(Argentina) San Lorenzo; (Argentina) River Plate; (Brazil) Cruzeiro; (Brazil) Atlético Mineiro; (Colombia) Atlético Nacional; (Ecuador) Emelec; (Peru) Sporting Cristal; (Venezuela) Zamora	(Argentina) Racing; (Argentina) Boca Juniors; (Brazil) São Paulo; (Brazil) Internacional; (Colombia) Santa Fe; (Ecuador) Barcelona; (Peru) Juan Aurich; (Venezuela) Mineros	(Bolivia) Universitario; (Bolivia) San José; (Chile) Colo-Colo; Universidad de Chile; (Paraguay) Libertad; (Paraguay) Guaraní; (Uruguay) Danubio; (Uruguay) Montevideo Wanderers	(Mexico) Tigres UANL; (Mexico) Atlas; Winner G1; Winner G2; Winner G3; Winner G4; Winner G5; Winner G6

The six winners of the first stage which joined the 26 direct entrants were as follows:

- Winner G1: (Argentina) Huracán
- Winner G2: (Argentina) Estudiantes
- Winner G3: (Venezuela) Deportivo Táchira
- Winner G4: (Bolivia) The Strongest
- Winner G5: (Chile) Palestino
- Winner G6: (Brazil) Corinthians

== Format ==
In the second stage, each group was played on a home-and-away round-robin basis. The winners and runners-up of each group advanced to the round of 16.

=== Tiebreakers ===
The teams were ranked according to points (3 points for a win, 1 point for a draw, 0 points for a loss). If tied on points, tiebreakers were applied in the following order:

1. Goal difference in all games;
2. Goals scored in all games;
3. Goals scored in all away games;
4. Drawing of lots.

== Groups ==
The matches were played on February 17–19, 24–26, March 3–5, 10–12, 17–19, April 1, 7–9, 14–16, and 21–22, 2015.

=== Group 1 ===
Pos	Team	Pld	W	D	L	GF	GA	GD	Pts	Qualification	SFE	CAM	CCL	ATL
1	(Colombia) Santa Fe	6	4	0	2	10	5	+5	12	Advance to final stages	—	0–1	3–1	3–1
2	(Brazil) Atlético Mineiro	6	3	0	3	5	4	+1	9	Advance to final stages	2–0	—	2–0	0–1
3	(Chile) Colo-Colo	6	3	0	3	8	9	−1	9		0–3	2–0	—	2–0
4	(Mexico) Atlas	6	2	0	4	4	9	−5	6		0–1	1–0	1–3	—

Source: CONMEBOL
Rules for classification: Second stage tiebreakers
February 17, 2015
20:45 UTC−6

Atlas (Mexico)	0–1	(Colombia) Santa Fe
	Report	Arias 77'

Estadio Jalisco, Guadalajara
Referee: Diego Haro (Peru)
February 18, 2015
21:00 UTC−3

Colo-Colo (Chile)	2–0	(Brazil) Atlético Mineiro
Flores 39'; Paredes 66'	Report

Estadio Monumental David Arellano, Santiago
Referee: Mauro Vigliano (Argentina)

February 25, 2015
19:45 UTC−3

Atlético Mineiro (Brazil)	0–1	(Mexico) Atlas
	Report	Suárez 86'

Estádio Independência, Belo Horizonte
Attendance: 16,331
Referee: Darío Ubriaco (Uruguay)
February 26, 2015
20:30 UTC−5

Santa Fe (Colombia)	3–1	(Chile) Colo-Colo
Morelo 34', 43', 65'	Report	Suazo 51' (pen.)

Estadio El Campín, Bogotá
Referee: Germán Delfino (Argentina)

March 4, 2015
19:45 UTC−3

Colo-Colo (Chile)	2–0	(Mexico) Atlas
Paredes 68' (pen.), 90'	Report

Estadio Monumental David Arellano, Santiago
Referee: Raúl Orosco (Bolivia)
March 18, 2015
20:00 UTC−5

Santa Fe (Colombia)	0–1	(Brazil) Atlético Mineiro
	Report	Pratto 58'

Estadio El Campín, Bogotá
Referee: Néstor Pitana (Argentina)

April 7, 2015
20:15 UTC−5

Atlas (Mexico)	1–3	(Chile) Colo-Colo
Medina 19' (pen.)	Report	Paredes 9', 83'; Cáceres 90+2'

Estadio Jalisco, Guadalajara
Referee: Néstor Pitana (Argentina)
April 9, 2015
21:45 UTC−3

Atlético Mineiro (Brazil)	2–0	(Colombia) Santa Fe
Carlos 12'; Guilherme 90'	Report

Estádio Independência, Belo Horizonte
Attendance: 21,237
Referee: Andrés Cunha (Uruguay)

April 15, 2015
20:00 UTC−5

Atlas (Mexico)	1–0	(Brazil) Atlético Mineiro
González 39'	Report

Estadio Jalisco, Guadalajara
Referee: Patricio Loustau (Argentina)
April 15, 2015
22:00 UTC−3

Colo-Colo (Chile)	0–3	(Colombia) Santa Fe
	Report	Páez 30'; Pérez 46'; Mina 67'

Estadio Monumental David Arellano, Santiago
Referee: Darío Ubriaco (Uruguay)

April 22, 2015
19:45 UTC−3

Atlético Mineiro (Brazil)	2–0	(Chile) Colo-Colo
Pratto 18'; Rafael Carioca 79'	Report

Estádio Independência, Belo Horizonte
Attendance: 21,274
Referee: Carlos Vera (Ecuador)
April 22, 2015
17:45 UTC−5

Santa Fe (Colombia)	3–1	(Mexico) Atlas
Pérez 20'; Roa 30'; Rivera 90+2'	Report	Kannemann 60'

Estadio El Campín, Bogotá
Referee: Mauro Vigliano (Argentina)

=== Group 2 ===
Pos	Team	Pld	W	D	L	GF	GA	GD	Pts	Qualification	COR	SPA	SLA	DAN
1	(Brazil) Corinthians	6	4	1	1	9	3	+6	13	Advance to final stages	—	2–0	0–0	4–0
2	(Brazil) São Paulo	6	4	0	2	9	4	+5	12	Advance to final stages	2–0	—	1–0	4–0
3	(Argentina) San Lorenzo	6	2	1	3	3	4	−1	7		0–1	1–0	—	0–1
4	(Uruguay) Danubio	6	1	0	5	4	14	−10	3		1–2	1–2	1–2	—

Source: CONMEBOL
Rules for classification: Second stage tiebreakers
February 18, 2015
22:00 UTC−2

Corinthians (Brazil)	2–0	(Brazil) São Paulo
Elias 11'; Jádson 67'	Report

Arena Corinthians, São Paulo
Attendance: 39,026
Referee: Ricardo Marques (Brazil)

Note: This was the first time the Clássico Majestoso derby matches between Corinthians and São Paulo were played in the Copa Libertadores.

February 19, 2015
20:45 UTC−2

Danubio (Uruguay)	1–2	(Argentina) San Lorenzo
Castro 10'	Report	Matos 85'; Cetto 87'

Estadio Centenario, Montevideo
Referee: Enrique Cáceres (Paraguay)

February 25, 2015
22:00 UTC−3

São Paulo (Brazil)	4–0	(Uruguay) Danubio
Pato 3', 40'; Reinaldo 69'; Jonathan Cafu 88'	Report

Estádio do Morumbi, São Paulo
Attendance: 16,689
Referee: Enrique Osses (Chile)
March 4, 2015
22:00 UTC−3

San Lorenzo (Argentina)	0–1	(Brazil) Corinthians
	Report	Elias 65'

Estadio Pedro Bidegain, Buenos Aires
Attendance: 0
Referee: Carlos Vera (Ecuador)

Note: San Lorenzo played their home match against Corinthians behind closed doors as they were punished for crowd disturbances in the second leg of the 2014 Copa Libertadores Finals.

March 17, 2015
20:00 UTC−3

Danubio (Uruguay)	1–2	(Brazil) Corinthians
Barreto 90+3'	Report	Guerrero 70'; Felipe 79'

Estadio Luis Franzini, Montevideo
Referee: Julio Bascuñán (Chile)
March 18, 2015
22:00 UTC−3

São Paulo (Brazil)	1–0	(Argentina) San Lorenzo
Michel Bastos 89'	Report

Estádio do Morumbi, São Paulo
Attendance: 26,176
Referee: Wilmar Roldán (Colombia)

April 1, 2015
19:45 UTC−3

San Lorenzo (Argentina)	1–0	(Brazil) São Paulo
Cauteruccio 70'	Report

Estadio Pedro Bidegain, Buenos Aires
Referee: Enrique Osses (Chile)
April 1, 2015
22:00 UTC−3

Corinthians (Brazil)	4–0	(Uruguay) Danubio
Jádson 26'; Guerrero 32', 46', 67'	Report

Arena Corinthians, São Paulo
Attendance: 38,928
Referee: Diego Haro (Peru)

April 15, 2015
22:00 UTC−3

Danubio (Uruguay)	1–2	(Brazil) São Paulo
Sosa 47'	Report	Pato 60'; Centurión 90'

Estadio Luis Franzini, Montevideo
Referee: José Argote (Venezuela)
April 16, 2015
22:00 UTC−3

Corinthians (Brazil)	0–0	(Argentina) San Lorenzo
	Report

Arena Corinthians, São Paulo
Attendance: 41,107
Referee: Víctor Carrillo (Peru)

April 22, 2015
22:00 UTC−3

San Lorenzo (Argentina)	0–1	(Uruguay) Danubio
	Report	Viana 88'

Estadio Pedro Bidegain, Buenos Aires
Referee: Hernando Buitrago (Colombia)
April 22, 2015
22:00 UTC−3

São Paulo (Brazil)	2–0	(Brazil) Corinthians
Luís Fabiano 31'; Michel Bastos 39'	Report

Estádio do Morumbi, São Paulo
Attendance: 38,772
Referee: Sandro Ricci (Brazil)

=== Group 3 ===
Pos	Team	Pld	W	D	L	GF	GA	GD	Pts	Qualification	CRU	UNI	HUR	MIN
1	(Brazil) Cruzeiro	6	3	2	1	8	3	+5	11	Advance to final stages	—	2–0	0–0	3–0
2	(Bolivia) Universitario de Sucre	6	2	3	1	4	3	+1	9	Advance to final stages	0–0	—	0–0	2–0
3	(Argentina) Huracán	6	1	4	1	6	7	−1	7		3–1	1–1	—	2–2
4	(Venezuela) Mineros de Guayana	6	1	1	4	5	10	−5	4		0–2	0–1	3–0	—

Source: CONMEBOL
Rules for classification: Second stage tiebreakers
February 24, 2015
19:00 UTC−3

Huracán (Argentina)	2–2	(Venezuela) Mineros
Villarruel 27'; Domínguez 88' (pen.)	Report	Valoyes 21', 81' (pen.)

Estadio Tomás Adolfo Ducó, Buenos Aires
Referee: Adrián Vélez (Colombia)
February 25, 2015
21:00 UTC−4

Universitario (Bolivia)	0–0	(Brazil) Cruzeiro
	Report

Estadio Olímpico Patria, Sucre
Referee: Omar Ponce (Ecuador)

March 3, 2015
18:15 UTC−4:30

Mineros (Venezuela)	0–1	(Bolivia) Universitario
	Report	Castro 73'

Estadio Cachamay, Puerto Ordaz
Referee: Fernando Guerrero (Mexico)
March 3, 2015
22:00 UTC−3

Cruzeiro (Brazil)	0–0	(Argentina) Huracán
	Report

Estádio Mineirão, Belo Horizonte
Attendance: 25,867
Referee: Enrique Cáceres (Paraguay)

March 10, 2015
18:30 UTC−4

Universitario (Bolivia)	0–0	(Argentina) Huracán
	Report

Estadio Olímpico Patria, Sucre
Referee: José Argote (Venezuela)
March 19, 2015
20:45 UTC−4:30

Mineros (Venezuela)	0–2	(Brazil) Cruzeiro
	Report	Leandro Damião 10'; Marquinhos 82'

Estadio Cachamay, Puerto Ordaz
Referee: Carlos Vera (Ecuador)

April 8, 2015
19:45 UTC−3

Huracán (Argentina)	1–1	(Bolivia) Universitario
Ábila 34'	Report	Suárez 39'

Estadio Tomás Adolfo Ducó, Buenos Aires
Referee: Ulises Mereles (Paraguay)
April 8, 2015
22:00 UTC−3

Cruzeiro (Brazil)	3–0	(Venezuela) Mineros
De Arrascaeta 12'; Leandro Damião 14'; Henrique 72'	Report

Estádio Mineirão, Belo Horizonte
Attendance: 17,750
Referee: Jorge Osorio (Chile)

April 14, 2015
19:00 UTC−3

Huracán (Argentina)	3–1	(Brazil) Cruzeiro
Ábila 14', 25'; Mancinelli 62'	Report	Leandro Damião 60' (pen.)

Estadio Tomás Adolfo Ducó, Buenos Aires
Referee: Patricio Polic (Chile)
April 14, 2015
18:00 UTC−4

Universitario (Bolivia)	2–0	(Venezuela) Mineros
Castro 45+1'; Suárez 84'	Report

Estadio Olímpico Patria, Sucre
Referee: Antonio Arias (Paraguay)

April 21, 2015
20:30 UTC−3

Cruzeiro (Brazil)	2–0	(Bolivia) Universitario
Willian 37'; Léo 56'	Report

Estádio Mineirão, Belo Horizonte
Attendance: 24,288
Referee: Roddy Zambrano (Ecuador)
April 21, 2015
19:00 UTC−4:30

Mineros (Venezuela)	3–0	(Argentina) Huracán
Valoyes 9', 39'; Acosta 64'	Report

Estadio Cachamay, Puerto Ordaz
Referee: Daniel Fedorczuk (Uruguay)

=== Group 4 ===
Pos	Team	Pld	W	D	L	GF	GA	GD	Pts	Qualification	INT	EME	STR	UCH
1	(Brazil) Internacional	6	4	1	1	13	7	+6	13	Advance to final stages	—	3–2	1–0	3–1
2	(Ecuador) Emelec	6	3	1	2	9	5	+4	10	Advance to final stages	1–1	—	3–0	2–0
3	(Bolivia) The Strongest	6	3	0	3	10	11	−1	9		3–1	1–0	—	5–3
4	Universidad de Chile	6	1	0	5	7	16	−9	3		0–4	0–1	3–1	—

Source: CONMEBOL
Rules for classification: Second stage tiebreakers
February 17, 2015
19:15 UTC−3

Universidad de Chile	0–1	(Ecuador) Emelec
	Report	Bolaños 63'

Estadio Nacional Julio Martínez Prádanos, Santiago
Referee: Silvio Trucco (Argentina)
February 17, 2015
20:30 UTC−4

The Strongest (Bolivia)	3–1	(Brazil) Internacional
Chumacero 10', 85'; Wayar 14'	Report	D'Alessandro 48' (pen.)

Estadio Hernando Siles, La Paz
Referee: Adrián Vélez (Colombia)

February 24, 2015
21:30 UTC−5

Emelec (Ecuador)	3–0	(Bolivia) The Strongest
Bolaños 3'; Fernández 23'; Mena 68'	Report

Estadio Jocay, Manta
Referee: José Argote (Venezuela)
February 26, 2015
20:15 UTC−3

Internacional (Brazil)	3–1	Universidad de Chile
D'Alessandro 45+1' (pen.); Jorge Henrique 60'; Eduardo Sasha 77'	Report	Canales 66'

Estádio Beira-Rio, Porto Alegre
Attendance: 32,133
Referee: Víctor Carrillo (Peru)

March 4, 2015
22:00 UTC−3

Internacional (Brazil)	3–2	(Ecuador) Emelec
Nilmar 10'; Alex 59'; Réver 82'	Report	Burbano 22'; Mena 45+1'

Estádio Beira-Rio, Porto Alegre
Attendance: 29,752
Referee: Néstor Pitana (Argentina)
March 5, 2015
20:15 UTC−3

Universidad de Chile	3–1	(Bolivia) The Strongest
Lorenzetti 19'; Ubilla 70'; Canales 77'	Report	Escobar 16'

Estadio Nacional Julio Martínez Prádanos, Santiago
Referee: Wilson Lamouroux (Colombia)

March 17, 2015
21:15 UTC−4

The Strongest (Bolivia)	5–3	Universidad de Chile
Centurión 45'; Castro 50'; Cristaldo 68'; Martelli 72'; Ramallo 86'	Report	Benegas 21'; Ubilla 70'; Corujo 71'

Estadio Hernando Siles, La Paz
Referee: Carlos Amarilla (Paraguay)
March 18, 2015
17:45 UTC−5

Emelec (Ecuador)	1–1	(Brazil) Internacional
Mena 31'	Report	Vitinho 55'

Estadio Jocay, Manta
Referee: Mauro Vigliano (Argentina)

April 15, 2015
16:30 UTC−4

The Strongest (Bolivia)	1–0	(Ecuador) Emelec
Chumacero 57'	Report

Estadio Hernando Siles, La Paz
Referee: Hernando Buitrago (Colombia)
April 16, 2015
22:00 UTC−3

Universidad de Chile	0–4	(Brazil) Internacional
	Report	Nilmar 9', 31'; Eduardo Sasha 12'; Valdívia 58'

Estadio Nacional Julio Martínez Prádanos, Santiago
Referee: Silvio Trucco (Argentina)

April 22, 2015
15:30 UTC−5

Emelec (Ecuador)	2–0	Universidad de Chile
Bolaños 41', 62'	Report

Estadio George Capwell, Guayaquil
Referee: Roberto García (Mexico)
April 22, 2015
17:30 UTC−3

Internacional (Brazil)	1–0	(Bolivia) The Strongest
Valdívia 40'	Report

Estádio Beira-Rio, Porto Alegre
Attendance: 37,190
Referee: Enrique Cáceres (Paraguay)

=== Group 5 ===
Pos	Team	Pld	W	D	L	GF	GA	GD	Pts	Qualification	BOC	WAN	PAL	ZAM
1	(Argentina) Boca Juniors	6	6	0	0	19	2	+17	18	Advance to final stages	—	2–1	2–0	5–0
2	(Uruguay) Montevideo Wanderers	6	3	1	2	9	8	+1	10	Advance to final stages	0–3	—	1–0	3–2
3	(Chile) Palestino	6	2	1	3	6	6	0	7		0–2	1–1	—	4–0
4	(Venezuela) Zamora	6	0	0	6	3	21	−18	0		1–5	0–3	0–1	—

Source: CONMEBOL
Rules for classification: Second stage tiebreakers
February 17, 2015
20:15 UTC−2

Montevideo Wanderers (Uruguay)	3–2	(Venezuela) Zamora
Rodríguez 45+1'; Albarracín 78' (pen.); Reymúndez 81'	Report	Murillo 25'; Flores 53'

Estadio Gran Parque Central, Montevideo
Referee: Raúl Orosco (Bolivia)
February 18, 2015
18:45 UTC−3

Palestino (Chile)	0–2	(Argentina) Boca Juniors
	Report	Chávez 37'; Palacios 68'

Estadio Santa Laura-Universidad SEK, Independencia
Referee: Wilmar Roldán (Colombia)

February 26, 2015
20:15 UTC−3

Boca Juniors (Argentina)	2–1	(Uruguay) Montevideo Wanderers
Komar 32'; Osvaldo 42'	Report	Riolfo 33'

Estadio Alberto J. Armando, Buenos Aires
Referee: Ricardo Marques (Brazil)
February 26, 2015
21:00 UTC−4:30

Zamora (Venezuela)	0–1	(Chile) Palestino
	Report	Márquez 44'

Estadio Agustín Tovar, Barinas
Referee: Julio Quintana (Paraguay)

March 10, 2015
19:30 UTC−3

Montevideo Wanderers (Uruguay)	1–0	(Chile) Palestino
Santos 22'	Report

Estadio Gran Parque Central, Montevideo
Referee: Adrián Vélez (Colombia)
March 11, 2015
20:00 UTC−3

Boca Juniors (Argentina)	5–0	(Venezuela) Zamora
Meli 7'; Lodeiro 14'; Carrizo 36'; Osvaldo 68', 81' (pen.)	Report

Estadio Alberto J. Armando, Buenos Aires
Referee: Hernando Buitrago (Colombia)

March 17, 2015
20:45 UTC−4:30

Zamora (Venezuela)	1–5	(Argentina) Boca Juniors
Murillo 17'	Report	Martínez 51', 90+1'; Colazo 57', 70'; Chávez 77'

Estadio Agustín Tovar, Barinas
Referee: Luiz Flávio de Oliveira (Brazil)
March 19, 2015
20:00 UTC−3

Palestino (Chile)	1–1	(Uruguay) Montevideo Wanderers
J. Silva 65'	Report	A. Silva 35'

Estadio Santa Laura-Universidad SEK, Independencia
Referee: Víctor Carrillo (Peru)

April 7, 2015
20:00 UTC−3

Palestino (Chile)	4–0	(Venezuela) Zamora
Cháves 46', 84'; Valencia 67'; Vidangossy 87'	Report

Estadio Santa Laura-Universidad SEK, Independencia
Referee: Oscar Maldonado (Bolivia)
April 9, 2015
21:45 UTC−3

Montevideo Wanderers (Uruguay)	0–3	(Argentina) Boca Juniors
	Report	Calleri 8', 48'; Monzón 73'

Estadio Centenario, Montevideo
Referee: Sandro Ricci (Brazil)

April 16, 2015
18:15 UTC−4:30

Zamora (Venezuela)	0–3	(Uruguay) Montevideo Wanderers
	Report	Santos 33'; Albarracín 63'; Rodríguez 87'

Estadio Agustín Tovar, Barinas
Referee: Enrique Cáceres (Paraguay)
April 16, 2015
19:45 UTC−3

Boca Juniors (Argentina)	2–0	(Chile) Palestino
Marín 81'; Calleri 90+2'	Report

Estadio Alberto J. Armando, Buenos Aires
Referee: Wilton Sampaio (Brazil)

=== Group 6 ===
Pos	Team	Pld	W	D	L	GF	GA	GD	Pts	Qualification	TIG	RIV	JUA	SJO
1	(Mexico) Tigres UANL	6	4	2	0	16	7	+9	14	Advance to final stages	—	2–2	3–0	4–0
2	(Argentina) River Plate	6	1	4	1	8	7	+1	7	Advance to final stages	1–1	—	1–1	3–0
3	(Peru) Juan Aurich	6	1	3	2	9	11	−2	6		4–5	1–1	—	2–0
4	(Bolivia) San José	6	1	1	4	3	11	−8	4		0–1	2–0	1–1	—

Source: CONMEBOL
Rules for classification: Second stage tiebreakers
February 18, 2015
20:15 UTC−6

Tigres UANL (Mexico)	3–0	(Peru) Juan Aurich
Guerrón 37', 58'; Dueñas 64'	Report

Estadio Universitario, San Nicolás de los Garza
Referee: Fernando Falce (Uruguay)
February 19, 2015
21:00 UTC−4

San José (Bolivia)	2–0	(Argentina) River Plate
Orué 80'; Valverde 87'	Report

Estadio Jesús Bermúdez, Oruro
Referee: Daniel Fedorczuk (Uruguay)

March 5, 2015
20:15 UTC−3

River Plate (Argentina)	1–1	(Mexico) Tigres UANL
Sánchez 72'	Report	Guerrón 40'

Estadio Antonio Vespucio Liberti, Buenos Aires
Referee: Sandro Ricci (Brazil)
March 5, 2015
20:30 UTC−5

Juan Aurich (Peru)	2–0	(Bolivia) San José
Valoyes 5'; Ramos 22'	Report

Estadio Elías Aguirre, Chiclayo
Referee: Eduardo Gamboa (Chile)

March 11, 2015
21:15 UTC−4

San José (Bolivia)	0–1	(Mexico) Tigres UANL
	Report	Escoto 38'

Estadio Jesús Bermúdez, Oruro
Referee: Andrés Cunha (Uruguay)
March 12, 2015
20:15 UTC−5

Juan Aurich (Peru)	1–1	(Argentina) River Plate
Rengifo 66'	Report	Balanta 21'

Estadio Elías Aguirre, Chiclayo
Referee: Julio Quintana (Paraguay)

March 17, 2015
21:30 UTC−6

Tigres UANL (Mexico)	4–0	(Bolivia) San José
Guerrón 1'; Rafael Sóbis 19', 84'; Arévalo 77'	Report

Estadio Universitario, San Nicolás de los Garza
Referee: José Argote (Venezuela)
March 19, 2015
20:00 UTC−3

River Plate (Argentina)	1–1	(Peru) Juan Aurich
Mercado 25'	Report	Delgado 89'

Estadio Antonio Vespucio Liberti, Buenos Aires
Referee: Jorge Osorio (Chile)

April 7, 2015
21:15 UTC−4

San José (Bolivia)	1–1	(Peru) Juan Aurich
Reyes 34'	Report	Delgado 41'

Estadio Jesús Bermúdez, Oruro
Referee: Roddy Zambrano (Ecuador)
April 8, 2015
20:00 UTC−5

Tigres UANL (Mexico)	2–2	(Argentina) River Plate
Arévalo 11'; Álvarez 68'	Report	Gutiérrez 86'; Mora 89'

Estadio Universitario, San Nicolás de los Garza
Referee: Adrián Vélez (Colombia)

April 15, 2015
19:45 UTC−3

River Plate (Argentina)	3–0	(Bolivia) San José
Mora 42', 52' (pen.); Gutiérrez 54'	Report

Estadio Antonio Vespucio Liberti, Buenos Aires
Referee: Péricles Cortez (Brazil)
April 15, 2015
17:45 UTC−5

Juan Aurich (Peru)	4–5	(Mexico) Tigres UANL
Pacheco 13', 82'; Tejada 42', 51' (pen.)	Report	Esqueda 10', 16', 73'; Villalpando 66'; Espericueta 81'

Estadio Elías Aguirre, Chiclayo
Referee: Carlos Vera (Ecuador)

=== Group 7 ===
Pos	Team	Pld	W	D	L	GF	GA	GD	Pts	Qualification	CAN	EST	LIB	BAR
1	(Colombia) Atlético Nacional	6	3	2	1	12	7	+5	11	Advance to final stages	—	1–1	4–0	2–3
2	(Argentina) Estudiantes	6	3	1	2	7	3	+4	10	Advance to final stages	0–1	—	1–0	3–0
3	(Paraguay) Libertad	6	2	2	2	5	8	−3	8		2–2	1–0	—	1–1
4	(Ecuador) Barcelona	6	1	1	4	5	11	−6	4		1–2	0–2	0–1	—

Source: CONMEBOL
Rules for classification: Second stage tiebreakers
February 19, 2015
19:45 UTC−3

Libertad (Paraguay)	2–2	(Colombia) Atlético Nacional
González 20'; López 33' (pen.)	Report	Zeballos 4'; Ruiz 59' (pen.)

Estadio Dr. Nicolás Léoz, Asunción
Referee: Sandro Ricci (Brazil)
February 25, 2015
19:45 UTC−3

Estudiantes (Argentina)	3–0	(Ecuador) Barcelona
Carrillo 16', 36', 74'	Report

Estadio Ciudad de La Plata, La Plata
Referee: Héber Lopes (Brazil)

March 3, 2015
17:45 UTC−5

Barcelona (Ecuador)	0–1	(Paraguay) Libertad
	Report	Recalde 77'

Estadio Monumental Isidro Romero Carbo, Guayaquil
Referee: Daniel Fedorczuk (Uruguay)
March 5, 2015
20:30 UTC−5

Atlético Nacional (Colombia)	1–1	(Argentina) Estudiantes
Zeballos 42'	Report	Jara 68'

Estadio Atanasio Girardot, Medellín
Referee: Julio Bascuñán (Chile)

March 11, 2015
20:15 UTC−5

Barcelona (Ecuador)	1–2	(Colombia) Atlético Nacional
Alemán 1'	Report	Guerra 65'; Ruiz 90+4'

Estadio Monumental Isidro Romero Carbo, Guayaquil
Referee: Enrique Osses (Chile)
March 12, 2015
19:45 UTC−3

Libertad (Paraguay)	1–0	(Argentina) Estudiantes
Tréllez 62'	Report

Estadio Manuel Ferreira, Asunción
Referee: Péricles Cortez (Brazil)

March 18, 2015
19:45 UTC−3

Estudiantes (Argentina)	1–0	(Paraguay) Libertad
Carrillo 79'	Report

Estadio Ciudad de La Plata, La Plata
Referee: Ricardo Marques (Brazil)
March 19, 2015
20:15 UTC−5

Atlético Nacional (Colombia)	2–3	(Ecuador) Barcelona
Palomino 26'; Mejía 70'	Report	Esterilla 37'; Alemán 46', 51'

Estadio Atanasio Girardot, Medellín
Referee: Leandro Vuaden (Brazil)

April 9, 2015
19:30 UTC−3

Estudiantes (Argentina)	0–1	(Colombia) Atlético Nacional
	Report	Mejía 36'

Estadio Ciudad de La Plata, La Plata
Referee: Daniel Fedorczuk (Uruguay)
April 9, 2015
18:30 UTC−4

Libertad (Paraguay)	1–1	(Ecuador) Barcelona
Benítez 57'	Report	Esterilla 9'

Estadio Dr. Nicolás Léoz, Asunción
Referee: Víctor Carrillo (Peru)

April 21, 2015
20:45 UTC−5

Atlético Nacional (Colombia)	4–0	(Paraguay) Libertad
Mejía 28'; Ruiz 50', 52'; Copete 72'	Report

Estadio Atanasio Girardot, Medellín
Referee: Héber Lopes (Brazil)
April 21, 2015
20:45 UTC−5

Barcelona (Ecuador)	0–2	(Argentina) Estudiantes
	Report	Acosta 77'; Carrillo 82'

Estadio Monumental Isidro Romero Carbo, Guayaquil
Referee: Andrés Cunha (Uruguay)

=== Group 8 ===
Pos	Team	Pld	W	D	L	GF	GA	GD	Pts	Qualification	RAC	GUA	CRI	TAC
1	(Argentina) Racing	6	4	0	2	15	7	+8	12	Advance to final stages	—	4–1	1–2	3–2
2	(Paraguay) Guaraní	6	2	3	1	12	10	+2	9	Advance to final stages	2–0	—	2–2	5–2
3	(Peru) Sporting Cristal	6	1	4	1	6	7	−1	7		0–2	1–1	—	1–1
4	(Venezuela) Deportivo Táchira	6	0	3	3	6	15	−9	3		0–5	1–1	0–0	—

Source: CONMEBOL
Rules for classification: Second stage tiebreakers
February 17, 2015
20:00 UTC−4:30

Deportivo Táchira (Venezuela)	0–5	(Argentina) Racing
	Report	Lollo 20'; Bou 39', 52', 68'; Milito 55'

Estadio Polideportivo de Pueblo Nuevo, San Cristóbal
Referee: Julio Bascuñán (Chile)
February 18, 2015
18:45 UTC−3

Guaraní (Paraguay)	2–2	(Peru) Sporting Cristal
Fernández 69'; Santander 84'	Report	Pereyra 31'; Ballón 47'

Estadio Defensores del Chaco, Asunción
Referee: Péricles Cortez (Brazil)

February 24, 2015
21:15 UTC−3

Racing (Argentina)	4–1	(Paraguay) Guaraní
Bou 43', 78', 81'; Milito 48'	Report	Santander 64'

Estadio Presidente Juan Domingo Perón, Avellaneda
Referee: Andrés Cunha (Uruguay)
February 24, 2015
21:30 UTC−5

Sporting Cristal (Peru)	1–1	(Venezuela) Deportivo Táchira
Lobatón 26'	Report	González 87'

Estadio Nacional, Lima
Referee: Imer Machado (Colombia)

March 10, 2015
21:45 UTC−3

Racing (Argentina)	1–2	(Peru) Sporting Cristal
Fernández 66'	Report	Lobatón 58', 80' (pen.)

Estadio Presidente Juan Domingo Perón, Avellaneda
Referee: Roddy Zambrano (Ecuador)
March 10, 2015
21:45 UTC−3

Guaraní (Paraguay)	5–2	(Venezuela) Deportivo Táchira
Ocampo 9'; Mendoza 34'; Santander 39' (pen.); Benítez 40'; Fernández 87'	Report	González 16'; López 48'

Estadio Defensores del Chaco, Asunción
Referee: Diego Haro (Peru)

March 17, 2015
18:00 UTC−5

Sporting Cristal (Peru)	0–2	(Argentina) Racing
	Report	Milito 76' (pen.); Videla 88'

Estadio Nacional, Lima
Referee: Daniel Fedorczuk (Uruguay)
March 18, 2015
20:30 UTC−4:30

Deportivo Táchira (Venezuela)	1–1	(Paraguay) Guaraní
González 20' (pen.)	Report	Benítez 41' (pen.)

Estadio Polideportivo de Pueblo Nuevo, San Cristóbal
Referee: Hernando Buitrago (Colombia)

April 7, 2015
19:00 UTC−4

Guaraní (Paraguay)	2–0	(Argentina) Racing
Santander 66'; Palau 80'	Report

Estadio Defensores del Chaco, Asunción
Referee: Héber Lopes (Brazil)
April 8, 2015
18:15 UTC−4:30

Deportivo Táchira (Venezuela)	0–0	(Peru) Sporting Cristal
	Report

Estadio Polideportivo de Pueblo Nuevo, San Cristóbal
Referee: Raúl Orosco (Bolivia)

April 14, 2015
19:15 UTC−5

Sporting Cristal (Peru)	1–1	(Paraguay) Guaraní
Blanco 58'	Report	Santander 13'

Estadio Nacional, Lima
Referee: Julio Bascuñán (Chile)
April 14, 2015
21:15 UTC−3

Racing (Argentina)	3–2	(Venezuela) Deportivo Táchira
Milito 57'; Bou 69'; Fernández 90'	Report	Meza 29', 48'

Estadio Presidente Juan Domingo Perón, Avellaneda
Referee: Carlos Orbe (Ecuador)
