= 2015 Barcelona Sporting Club season =

Ecuadorian football club season

Barcelona
2015 season
- President: Antonio Noboa (until September 30, 2015); José Francisco Cevallos (from October 1, 2015)
- Manager: Rubén Israel; Guillermo Almada
- Stadium: Monumental Isidro Romero Carbo
- Serie A: 5th
- Copa Libertadores: Second stage (groups)
- Top goalscorer: League: Ismael Blanco (14); All: Ismael Blanco (14)
- Highest home attendance: 23,120 vs Deportivo Quito (April 5, 2015)
- Lowest home attendance: 2,552 vs LDU Loja (July 12, 2015)
Home colours	Away colours	Third colours

The 2015 season was Barcelona Sporting Club's the 90th year in existence and the club's 57th in the top flight of Ecuadorian football. Barcelona was one of the twelve participating clubs in the top flight of Ecuadorian Football Championship 2015. Besides the local tournament, Barcelona took part in the 2015 edition of the Copa Libertadores.

The club reaffirmed as technical director of team staff to the Uruguayan Rubén Israel, extending his contract until the middle of 2015. However, the poor results that the club had in the first half of the season led to the directive to not renew his contract. Israel's last game as coach of the club was on May 28 in a friendly match against RCD Espanyol in an exhibition tournament called 2015 Copa EuroAmericana, which won the Barcelona. The club hired Guillermo Almada to replace him.

Barcelona joined the group 7 of the Copa Libertadores, in which-after one win, one draw and four defeats did not qualify to the second round, being eliminated from the tournament.

In the first stage of the Serie A, Barcelona was ranked in fourth place, and in the second stage in sixth place; after which he could not access the two spots that led to the finals of the local tournament. In total, Barcelona reached fourth place in the accumulated table, reaching only qualifying for the 2016 Copa Sudamericana with the quota of Ecuador 2.

== Pre-season and friendlies ==
Win Draw Loss

January 10	Real España (Honduras)	0–3	(Ecuador) Barcelona	San Pedro Sula
20:00 (ECT)		Report	J. Perlaza 3'; A. Wila 42'; A. Colón 77'	Stadium: Estadio Francisco Morazán

January 25	Aucas (Ecuador)	0–2	(Ecuador) Barcelona	Quito
13:00 (ECT)		Report	M. de Jesús 21', 40'	Stadium: Estadio Chillogallo; Referee: Juan Carlos Albarracin

January 28	Barcelona (Ecuador)	2–2	(Colombia) Cúcuta Deportivo	Guayaquil
21:15 (ECT)	I. Blanco 3', 11'	Report	C. Canga 70', 84'	Stadium: Estadio Monumental; Referee: Omar Ponce

February 5	Barcelona (Ecuador)	1–0	(Ecuador) Deportivo Azogues	Guayaquil
11:00 (ECT)	C. Olivero	Report		Stadium: Estadio Monumental

February 11	Delfín (Ecuador)	2–2 (3:4 p)	(Ecuador) Barcelona	Manta
20:30 (ECT)	P. Cifuentes 57'; A. George 80'	Report	J. de la Cruz 21'; E. Esterilla 49'	Stadium: Estadio Jocay; Referee: Sandro Vera
	Penalties
	F. Sílva (penalty missed); E. Bone; V. Mendoza; A. George; S. Giménez (penalty missed)		E. Esterilla; (penalty missed) A. Lamas; W. Vera; B. de la Torre; M. Banguera

November 14	Barcelona (Ecuador)	2–1	(Ecuador) Emelec	Guayaquil
16:30 (ECT)	I. Blanco 1'; D. Díaz 72'	Report	E. Herrera 75'	Stadium: Estadio Monumental; Attendance: 6206; Referee: Édgar Hinostroza

November 18	Fuerza Amarilla (Ecuador)	0–2	(Ecuador) Barcelona	Machala
19:30 (ECT)		Report	B. Alemán 82'; D. Díaz 88'	Stadium: Est. 9 de Mayo

December 20	Ecuador	3–2	(Ecuador) Barcelona	Esmeraldas
16:00 (ECT)	J. Angulo 16', 57'; J. Cazares 81'	Report	C. Gruezo 1'; E. Castillo 65'	Stadium: Est. Folke Anderson

December 27	Fuerza Amarilla (Ecuador)	0–2	(Ecuador) Barcelona	Machala
20:00				Stadium: Est. 9 de Mayo

== Competitions ==
=== Overall ===
Competition	Started round	Current position / round	Final position / round	First match	Last match
Serie A	—	—	5th	31 January 2015	13 December 2015
Copa Libertadores	Group stage	—	Group stage	25 February 2015	21 April 2015

Updated to match played 30 December 2015
Source: Competitions

=== Serie A ===
==== First stage ====
===== Stage table =====
Pos	Team	Pld	W	D	L	GF	GA	GD	Pts
2	Emelec	22	13	6	3	41	18	+23	45
3	Independiente del Valle	22	12	6	4	35	24	+11	42
4	Barcelona	22	10	3	9	33	24	+9	33
5	Deportivo Quito	22	7	8	7	33	37	−4	29
6	El Nacional	22	8	4	10	28	24	+4	28

===== Results summary =====
Overall								Home						Away					
Pld	W	D	L	GF	GA	GD	Pts	W	D	L	GF	GA	GD	W	D	L	GF	GA	GD
22	10	3	9	33	24	+9	33	7	1	3	20	7	+13	3	2	6	13	17	−4

Last updated: 30 December 2015.
Source: Competitive matches

===== Results by round =====
Round	1	2	3	4	5	6	7	8	9	10	11	12	13	14	15	16	17	18	19	20	21	22
Ground		H	H		H		H		H		H		H		H		H		H			H
Result	D	D	W	L	W	L	W	L	W	W	L	L	W	D	L	L	W	W	L	W	L	W
Position	5	8	5	6	7	9	6	6	6	4	4	6	5	5	6	6	4	4	4	4	4	4

Source: Competitive matches
A = Away; H = Home; W = Win; D = Draw; L = Loss

==== Second stage ====
===== Stage table =====
Pos	Team	Pld	W	D	L	GF	GA	GD	Pts
4	Independiente del Valle	22	11	4	7	45	30	+15	37
5	Aucas	22	8	8	6	27	25	+2	32
6	Barcelona	22	8	7	7	23	21	+2	31
7	River Plate	22	7	7	8	26	30	−4	28
8	LDU Loja	22	8	3	11	28	33	−5	27

===== Results summary =====
Overall								Home						Away					
Pld	W	D	L	GF	GA	GD	Pts	W	D	L	GF	GA	GD	W	D	L	GF	GA	GD
22	8	7	7	28	16	+12	31	5	4	2	13	6	+7	3	3	5	15	10	+5

Last updated: 30 December 2015.
Source: Competitive matches

==== Aggregate table ====
Pos	Team	Pld	W	D	L	GF	GA	GD	Pts	Qualification or relegation
2	Emelec	44	25	13	6	83	38	+45	88	Copa Libertadores second stage
3	Independiente del Valle	44	23	10	11	80	54	+26	79	Copa Libertadores first stage
4	Barcelona	44	18	10	16	56	45	+11	64	Copa Sudamericana first stage
5	Universidad Católica	44	17	10	17	57	58	−1	61	Copa Sudamericana first stage
6	Aucas	44	13	15	16	59	59	0	54	Copa Sudamericana first stage

Updated to match(es) played on unknown. Source:

=== Copa Libertadores ===
==== Group stage ====
Pos	Team	Pld	W	D	L	GF	GA	GD	Pts	Qualification
1	(Colombia) Atlético Nacional	6	3	2	1	12	7	+5	11	Advance to final stages
2	(Argentina) Estudiantes	6	3	1	2	7	3	+4	10	Advance to final stages
3	(Paraguay) Libertad	6	2	2	2	5	8	−3	8	
4	(Ecuador) Barcelona	6	1	1	4	5	11	−6	4	

Source: CONMEBOL
Rules for classification: Second stage tiebreakers
