= 2015 Copa Libertadores final stages =

The 2015 Copa Libertadores final stages played from April 28 to August 5, 2015. A total of 16 teams competed in the final stages to decide the champions of the 2015 Copa Libertadores.

== Qualified teams ==
The winners and runners-up of each of the eight groups in the second stage qualified for the final stages.

Group	Winners	Runners-up
1	(Colombia) Santa Fe	(Brazil) Atlético Mineiro
2	(Brazil) Corinthians	(Brazil) São Paulo
3	(Brazil) Cruzeiro	(Bolivia) Universitario de Sucre
4	(Brazil) Internacional	(Ecuador) Emelec
5	(Argentina) Boca Juniors	(Uruguay) Montevideo Wanderers
6	(Mexico) Tigres UANL	(Argentina) River Plate
7	(Colombia) Atlético Nacional	(Argentina) Estudiantes
8	(Argentina) Racing	(Paraguay) Guaraní

== Seeding ==
The qualified teams were seeded in the final stages according to their results in the second stage, with the group winners seeded 1–8, and the group runners-up seeded 9–16.

Seed	Grp	Team	Pld	W	D	L	GF	GA	GD	Pts	Round of 16
1	5	(Argentina) Boca Juniors	6	6	0	0	19	2	+17	18	Match A
2	6	(Mexico) Tigres UANL	6	4	2	0	16	7	+9	14	Match B
3	4	(Brazil) Internacional	6	4	1	1	13	7	+6	13	Match C
4	2	(Brazil) Corinthians	6	4	1	1	9	3	+6	13	Match D
5	8	(Argentina) Racing	6	4	0	2	15	7	+8	12	Match E
6	1	(Colombia) Santa Fe	6	4	0	2	10	5	+5	12	Match F
7	7	(Colombia) Atlético Nacional	6	3	2	1	12	7	+5	11	Match G
8	3	(Brazil) Cruzeiro	6	3	2	1	8	3	+5	11	Match H
9	2	(Brazil) São Paulo	6	4	0	2	9	4	+5	12	Match H
10	4	(Ecuador) Emelec	6	3	1	2	9	5	+4	10	Match G
11	7	(Argentina) Estudiantes	6	3	1	2	7	3	+4	10	Match F
12	5	(Uruguay) Montevideo Wanderers	6	3	1	2	9	8	+1	10	Match E
13	8	(Paraguay) Guaraní	6	2	3	1	12	10	+2	9	Match D
14	1	(Brazil) Atlético Mineiro	6	3	0	3	5	4	+1	9	Match C
15	3	(Bolivia) Universitario de Sucre	6	2	3	1	4	3	+1	9	Match B
16	6	(Argentina) River Plate	6	1	4	1	8	7	+1	7	Match A

Source: CONMEBOL
Rules for classification: 1) Higher position in group; 2) Points; 3) Goal difference; 4) Goals scored; 5) Away goals scored; 6) Drawing of lots.

== Format ==
In the final stages, the 16 teams played a single-elimination tournament, with the following rules:

- Each tie was played on a home-and-away two-legged basis, with the higher-seeded team hosting the second leg. However, CONMEBOL required that the second leg of the finals had to be played in South America, i.e., if there was a finalist from Mexico, they would have to host the first leg regardless of seeding.
- In the round of 16, quarterfinals, and semifinals, if tied on aggregate, the away goals rule would be used. If still tied, the penalty shoot-out would be used to determine the winner (no extra time would be played).
- In the finals, if tied on aggregate, the away goals rule would not be used, and 30 minutes of extra time would be played. If still tied after extra time, the penalty shoot-out would be used to determine the winner.
- If there were two semifinalists from the same association, they would have to play each other.

== Bracket ==
The bracket of the final stages was determined by the seeding as follows:

- Round of 16:
  - Match A: Seed 1 vs. Seed 16
  - Match B: Seed 2 vs. Seed 15
  - Match C: Seed 3 vs. Seed 14
  - Match D: Seed 4 vs. Seed 13
  - Match E: Seed 5 vs. Seed 12
  - Match F: Seed 6 vs. Seed 11
  - Match G: Seed 7 vs. Seed 10
  - Match H: Seed 8 vs. Seed 9
- Quarterfinals:
  - Match S1: Winner A vs. Winner H
  - Match S2: Winner B vs. Winner G
  - Match S3: Winner C vs. Winner F
  - Match S4: Winner D vs. Winner E
- Semifinals: (if there were two semifinalists from the same association, they would have to play each other)
  - Match F1: Winner S1 vs. Winner S4
  - Match F2: Winner S2 vs. Winner S3
- Finals: Winner F1 vs. Winner F2

Round of 16
11	(Argentina) Estudiantes	2	0	2
6	(Colombia) Santa Fe	1	2	3
14	(Brazil) Atlético Mineiro	2	1	3
3	(Brazil) Internacional	2	3	5
10	(Ecuador) Emelec	2	0	2
7	(Colombia) Atlético Nacional	0	1	1
15	(Bolivia) Universitario de Sucre	1	1	2
2	(Mexico) Tigres UANL	2	1	3
16	(Argentina) River Plate	1	0	1
1	(Argentina) Boca Juniors (DQ)	0	0	0
9	(Brazil) São Paulo	1	0	1 (3)
8	(Brazil) Cruzeiro (p)	0	1	1 (4)
13	(Paraguay) Guaraní	2	1	3
4	(Brazil) Corinthians	0	0	0
12	(Uruguay) Montevideo Wanderers	1	1	2
5	(Argentina) Racing	1	2	3

Quarterfinals
6	(Colombia) Santa Fe	1	0	1
3	(Brazil) Internacional	0	2	2
10	(Ecuador) Emelec	1	0	1
2	(Mexico) Tigres UANL	0	2	2
16	(Argentina) River Plate	0	3	3
8	(Brazil) Cruzeiro	1	0	1
13	(Paraguay) Guaraní	1	0	1
5	(Argentina) Racing	0	0	0

Semifinals
3	(Brazil) Internacional	2	1	3
2	(Mexico) Tigres UANL	1	3	4
16	(Argentina) River Plate	2	1	3
13	(Paraguay) Guaraní	0	1	1

Finals
2	(Mexico) Tigres UANL	0	0	0
16	(Argentina) River Plate	0	3	3

== Round of 16 ==
The first legs were played on April 28 and May 5–7, and the second legs were played on May 5 and 12–14, 2015.

Team 1	Agg.	Team 2	1st leg	2nd leg
River Plate (Argentina)	1–0	(Argentina) Boca Juniors	1–0	0–0 (susp.)
Universitario de Sucre (Bolivia)	2–3	(Mexico) Tigres UANL	1–2	1–1
Atlético Mineiro (Brazil)	3–5	(Brazil) Internacional	2–2	1–3
Guaraní (Paraguay)	3–0	(Brazil) Corinthians	2–0	1–0
Montevideo Wanderers (Uruguay)	2–3	(Argentina) Racing	1–1	1–2
Estudiantes (Argentina)	2–3	(Colombia) Santa Fe	2–1	0–2
Emelec (Ecuador)	2–1	(Colombia) Atlético Nacional	2–0	0–1
São Paulo (Brazil)	1–1 (3–4 p)	(Brazil) Cruzeiro	1–0	0–1

=== Match A ===
May 7, 2015
21:00 UTC−3

River Plate (Argentina)	1–0	(Argentina) Boca Juniors
Sánchez 81' (pen.)	Report

Estadio Antonio Vespucio Liberti, Buenos Aires
Attendance: 68,000
Referee: Germán Delfino (Argentina)

May 14, 2015
21:00 UTC−3

Boca Juniors (Argentina)	0–0 Suspended	(Argentina) River Plate
	Report

Estadio Alberto J. Armando, Buenos Aires
Attendance: 50,000
Referee: Darío Herrera (Argentina)

The second leg was suspended after River Plate players were attacked with pepper spray by Boca Juniors fans when the squad returned to the field following halftime, with the match still 0–0 (River Plate leading 1–0 on aggregate). CONMEBOL opened disciplinary proceedings against Boca Juniors, and decided to disqualify them from the tournament on May 16, 2015. River Plate advanced to the quarterfinals (Match S1).

=== Match B ===
April 28, 2015
20:30 UTC−4

Universitario de Sucre (Bolivia)	1–2	(Mexico) Tigres UANL
González 1'	Report	Esqueda 54'; Álvarez 62'

Estadio Olímpico Patria, Sucre
Attendance: 10,000
Referee: Patricio Loustau (Argentina)

May 5, 2015
21:00 UTC−5

Tigres UANL (Mexico)	1–1	(Bolivia) Universitario de Sucre
Rafael Sóbis 75' (pen.)	Report	Cuesta 1'

Estadio Universitario, San Nicolás de los Garza
Attendance: 40,000
Referee: Julio Bascuñán (Chile)

Tigres UANL won 3–2 on aggregate and advanced to the quarterfinals (Match S2).

=== Match C ===
May 6, 2015
22:00 UTC−3

Atlético Mineiro (Brazil)	2–2	(Brazil) Internacional
Douglas Santos 14'; Leonardo Silva 90+4'	Report	López 2'; Valdívia 60'

Estádio Independência, Belo Horizonte
Attendance: 19,553
Referee: Wilmar Roldán (Colombia)

May 13, 2015
22:00 UTC−3

Internacional (Brazil)	3–1	(Brazil) Atlético Mineiro
Valdívia 21'; D'Alessandro 45'; López 80'	Report	Pratto 58'

Estádio Beira-Rio, Porto Alegre
Attendance: 42,888
Referee: Julio Bascuñán (Chile)

Internacional won 5–3 on aggregate and advanced to the quarterfinals (Match S3).

=== Match D ===
May 6, 2015
18:45 UTC−4

Guaraní (Paraguay)	2–0	(Brazil) Corinthians
Santander 59'; Contrera 81'	Report

Estadio Defensores del Chaco, Asunción
Attendance: 8,000
Referee: Daniel Fedorczuk (Uruguay)

May 13, 2015
22:00 UTC−3

Corinthians (Brazil)	0–1	(Paraguay) Guaraní
	Report	Fernández 90+1'

Arena Corinthians, São Paulo
Attendance: 40,239
Referee: Enrique Osses (Chile)

Guaraní won 3–0 on aggregate and advanced to the quarterfinals (Match S4).

=== Match E ===
May 7, 2015
18:45 UTC−3

Montevideo Wanderers (Uruguay)	1–1	(Argentina) Racing
Santos 54'	Report	Fernández 86'

Estadio Gran Parque Central, Montevideo
Attendance: 26,000
Referee: Péricles Cortez (Brazil)

May 14, 2015
18:30 UTC−3

Racing (Argentina)	2–1	(Uruguay) Montevideo Wanderers
Camacho 15'; Bou 39'	Report	Olivera 88'

Estadio Presidente Juan Domingo Perón, Avellaneda
Attendance: 35,000
Referee: Wilmar Roldán (Colombia)

Racing won 3–2 on aggregate and advanced to the quarterfinals (Match S4).

=== Match F ===
May 5, 2015
20:45 UTC−3

Estudiantes (Argentina)	2–1	(Colombia) Santa Fe
Auzqui 20'; Carrillo 29'	Report	Morelo 80'

Estadio Ciudad de La Plata, La Plata
Attendance: 25,000
Referee: Antonio Arias (Paraguay)

May 12, 2015
19:30 UTC−5

Santa Fe (Colombia)	2–0	(Argentina) Estudiantes
Meza 33'; Rivera 79'	Report

Estadio El Campín, Bogotá
Attendance: 20,000
Referee: Carlos Vera (Ecuador)

Santa Fe won 3–2 on aggregate and advanced to the quarterfinals (Match S3).

=== Match G ===
May 7, 2015
21:15 UTC−5

Emelec (Ecuador)	2–0	(Colombia) Atlético Nacional
Herrera 40'; Bolaños 73'	Report

Estadio Jocay, Manta
Attendance: 15,000
Referee: Ricardo Marques (Brazil)

May 14, 2015
21:30 UTC−5

Atlético Nacional (Colombia)	1–0	(Ecuador) Emelec
Henríquez 60'	Report

Estadio Atanasio Girardot, Medellín
Attendance: 25,000
Referee: Víctor Carrillo (Peru)

Emelec won 2–1 on aggregate and advanced to the quarterfinals (Match S2).

=== Match H ===
May 6, 2015
22:00 UTC−3

São Paulo (Brazil)	1–0	(Brazil) Cruzeiro
Centurión 82'	Report

Estádio do Morumbi, São Paulo
Attendance: 66,369
Referee: Carlos Amarilla (Paraguay)

May 13, 2015
19:30 UTC−3

Cruzeiro (Brazil)	1–0	(Brazil) São Paulo
Leandro Damião 54'	Report
Penalties
Leandro Damião (penalty missed); Marquinhos (penalty scored); De Arrascaeta (penalty scored); Henrique (penalty scored); Manoel (penalty missed); Gabriel Xavier (penalty scored)	4–3	(penalty scored) Rogério Ceni; (penalty scored) Ganso; (penalty missed) Souza; (penalty missed) Luís Fabiano; (penalty scored) Centurión; (penalty missed) Lucão

Estádio Mineirão, Belo Horizonte
Attendance: 37,719
Referee: Andrés Cunha (Uruguay)

Tied 1–1 on aggregate, Cruzeiro won on penalties and advanced to the quarterfinals (Match S1).

== Quarterfinals ==
The first legs were played on May 19–21, and the second legs were played on May 26–28, 2015.

Team 1	Agg.	Team 2	1st leg	2nd leg
River Plate (Argentina)	3–1	(Brazil) Cruzeiro	0–1	3–0
Emelec (Ecuador)	1–2	(Mexico) Tigres UANL	1–0	0–2
Santa Fe (Colombia)	1–2	(Brazil) Internacional	1–0	0–2
Guaraní (Paraguay)	1–0	(Argentina) Racing	1–0	0–0

=== Match S1 ===
May 21, 2015
22:00 UTC−3

River Plate (Argentina)	0–1	(Brazil) Cruzeiro
	Report	Marquinhos 81'

Estadio Antonio Vespucio Liberti, Buenos Aires
Attendance: 35,000
Referee: Enrique Osses (Chile)

May 27, 2015
22:00 UTC−3

Cruzeiro (Brazil)	0–3	(Argentina) River Plate
	Report	Sánchez 19'; Maidana 44'; Gutiérrez 51'

Estádio Mineirão, Belo Horizonte
Attendance: 54,890
Referee: Wilmar Roldán (Colombia)

River Plate won 3–1 on aggregate and advanced to the semifinals (Match F1).

=== Match S2 ===
May 19, 2015
20:00 UTC−5

Emelec (Ecuador)	1–0	(Mexico) Tigres UANL
Bolaños 63'	Report

Estadio Jocay, Manta
Attendance: 22,000
Referee: Fernando Rapallini (Argentina)

May 26, 2015
20:00 UTC−5

Tigres UANL (Mexico)	2–0	(Ecuador) Emelec
Rafael Sóbis 5'; Rivas 79'	Report

Estadio Universitario, San Nicolás de los Garza
Attendance: 42,000
Referee: Enrique Cáceres (Paraguay)

Tigres UANL won 2–1 on aggregate and advanced to the semifinals (Match F2).

=== Match S3 ===
May 20, 2015
20:00 UTC−5

Santa Fe (Colombia)	1–0	(Brazil) Internacional
Mosquera 90+1'	Report

Estadio El Campín, Bogotá
Attendance: 18,860
Referee: Néstor Pitana (Argentina)

May 27, 2015
19:30 UTC−3

Internacional (Brazil)	2–0	(Colombia) Santa Fe
Juan 2'; Mina 88' (o.g.)	Report

Estádio Beira-Rio, Porto Alegre
Attendance: 44,665
Referee: Víctor Carrillo (Peru)

Internacional won 2–1 on aggregate and advanced to the semifinals (Match F2).

=== Match S4 ===
May 21, 2015
18:45 UTC−4

Guaraní (Paraguay)	1–0	(Argentina) Racing
Benítez 84'	Report

Estadio Defensores del Chaco, Asunción
Attendance: 18,000
Referee: Sandro Ricci (Brazil)

May 28, 2015
21:00 UTC−3

Racing (Argentina)	0–0	(Paraguay) Guaraní
	Report

Estadio Presidente Juan Domingo Perón, Avellaneda
Attendance: 50,000
Referee: Andrés Cunha (Uruguay)

Guaraní won 1–0 on aggregate and advanced to the semifinals (Match F1).

== Semifinals ==
The first legs were played on July 14–15, and the second legs were played on July 21–22, 2015.

Team 1	Agg.	Team 2	1st leg	2nd leg
River Plate (Argentina)	3–1	(Paraguay) Guaraní	2–0	1–1
Internacional (Brazil)	3–4	(Mexico) Tigres UANL	2–1	1–3

=== Match F1 ===
July 14, 2015
21:00 UTC−3

River Plate (Argentina)	2–0	(Paraguay) Guaraní
Mercado 59'; Mora 72'	Report

Estadio Antonio Vespucio Liberti, Buenos Aires
Attendance: 67,000
Referee: Daniel Fedorczuk (Uruguay)

July 21, 2015
20:00 UTC−4

Guaraní (Paraguay)	1–1	(Argentina) River Plate
Fernández 61'	Report	Alario 78'

Estadio Defensores del Chaco, Asunción
Attendance: 35,000
Referee: Julio Bascuñán (Chile)

River Plate won 3–1 on aggregate and advanced to the finals.

=== Match F2 ===
July 15, 2015
22:00 UTC−3

Internacional (Brazil)	2–1	(Mexico) Tigres UANL
D'Alessandro 4'; Valdívia 9'	Report	Ayala 23'

Estádio Beira-Rio, Porto Alegre
Attendance: 44,884
Referee: José Argote (Venezuela)

July 22, 2015
20:00 UTC−5

Tigres UANL (Mexico)	3–1	(Brazil) Internacional
Gignac 17'; Geferson 40' (o.g.); Arévalo 55'	Report	López 88'

Estadio Universitario, San Nicolás de los Garza
Attendance: 42,000
Referee: Carlos Vera (Ecuador)

Tigres UANL won 4–3 on aggregate and advanced to the finals.

== Finals ==
The finals were played on a home-and-away two-legged basis. If tied on aggregate, the away goals rule would not be used, and 30 minutes of extra time would be played. If still tied after extra time, the penalty shoot-out would be used to determine the winner.

Since Tigres UANL are from Mexico, they had to host the first leg regardless of seeding (Regulations Article 3.7b: "El Torneo deberá indefectiblemente finalizar en un país perteneciente al continente sudamericano. Para tal caso, de llegar a las finales un equipo que no pertenece al continente sudamericano, deberá indefectiblemente jugar su primer partido de local." English translation: "The Tournament shall invariably end in a country belonging to the South American continent. Therefore, provided that a team not belonging to the South American continent qualifies to the finals, it shall invariably play the first leg at its home.")

The first leg was played on July 29, and the second leg was played on August 5, 2015.

July 29, 2015
20:00 UTC−5

Tigres UANL (Mexico)	0–0	(Argentina) River Plate
	Report

Estadio Universitario, San Nicolás de los Garza
Attendance: 40,000
Referee: Antonio Arias (Paraguay)

August 5, 2015
22:00 UTC−3

River Plate (Argentina)	3–0	(Mexico) Tigres UANL
Alario 44'; Sánchez 74' (pen.); Funes Mori 78'	Report

Estadio Antonio Vespucio Liberti, Buenos Aires
Attendance: 69,000
Referee: Darío Ubriaco (Uruguay)
