= Eduardo Sasha =

Brazilian footballer (born 1992)

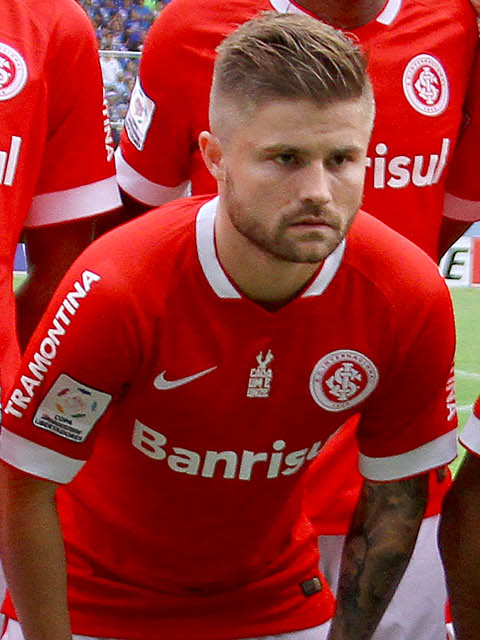
- Sasha lining up for Internacional in 2015

Personal information
- Full name: Eduardo Colcenti Antunes
- Date of birth: 24 February 1992 (age 34)
- Place of birth: Porto Alegre, Brazil
- Height: 1.73 m (5 ft 8 in)
- Position: Forward

Team information
- Current team: Red Bull Bragantino
- Number: 8

Youth career
- 2007–2010: Internacional

Senior career*
Years	Team	Apps	(Gls)
2010–2018	Internacional	121	(25)
2012–2013	→ Goiás (loan)	44	(7)
2018	→ Santos (loan)	15	(4)
2018–2020	Santos	74	(17)
2020–2023	Atlético Mineiro	113	(22)
2023–	Red Bull Bragantino	139	(35)

International career^{‡}
2014	Brazil	0	(0)
- * Club domestic league appearances and goals as of 2 October 2026 ‡ National team caps and goals as of 19:28, 14 October 2014 (UTC)

Eduardo Colcenti Antunes (born 24 February 1992), known as Eduardo Sasha or simply Sasha, is a Brazilian footballer who plays as a forward for Red Bull Bragantino.

He made his professional debut for Internacional in 2010, and has won the Campeonato Gaúcho four times for the club. He spent 18 months on loan at Goiás, where he won the Campeonato Brasileiro Série B and the Campeonato Goiano. In 2018 he moved to Santos. In 2020, Sasha joined Atlético Mineiro, winning the Campeonato Brasileiro Série A and the Copa do Brasil in 2021, among other titles.

== Career ==
=== Internacional ===
Born in Porto Alegre, Rio Grande do Sul; due to his style of hair in his youth, and his brother already being nicknamed after Brazilian presenter Xuxa, he earned the sobriquet Sasha after her daughter Sasha Meneghel.

He began his career at hometown team Internacional. On 10 September 2010, aged 18, he signed his first contract for a length of five years, with a release clause set at €40 million (R$ 87 million). Two days later, he made his debut in a goalless home draw against Goiás in that year's Campeonato Brasileiro Série A, as a 62nd-minute substitute for Giuliano. He made one more appearance off the bench over the season, and was included in Inter's squad for the 2010 FIFA Club World Cup in the United Arab Emirates, but did not take to the field as his team came third.

On 19 March 2011, he made his Campeonato Gaúcho debut by replacing Daniel for the final six minutes of a goalless draw against Novo Hamburgo at Beira-Rio, his sole appearance of a season which his team ended as champions. He made two appearances the following season, including a first senior start on 26 January in a 1–2 home loss to Cerâmica.

==== Loan to Goiás ====
On 10 May 2012, Sasha was loaned to Goiás for the upcoming Série B season; he was the team's 17th signing of the year and the fifth from Internacional, including his youth team strike partner Ricardo Goulart. He made seven substitute appearances as his team won the championship.

On 23 January 2013, as a half-time replacement for Caio in the second game of that year's Campeonato Goiano, he scored his first senior goal to give the Esmeraldino the lead in an eventual 3–1 win at Grêmio Anápolis. He totalled three goals in 21 appearances as his team won the state title, one coming in a 4–1 win (5–3 aggregate) at Aparecidense in the semi-finals on 5 May.

Later in the year, Sasha's four goals in 16 games helped Goiás to sixth place in the edition of the national league; his first such strike came on 18 September as a substitute for Renan Oliveira in a 2–2 draw at Coritiba. He totalled another three goals in eight games in the 2013 Copa do Brasil, including one in the semi-final defeat to Flamengo.

==== Return to Internacional ====
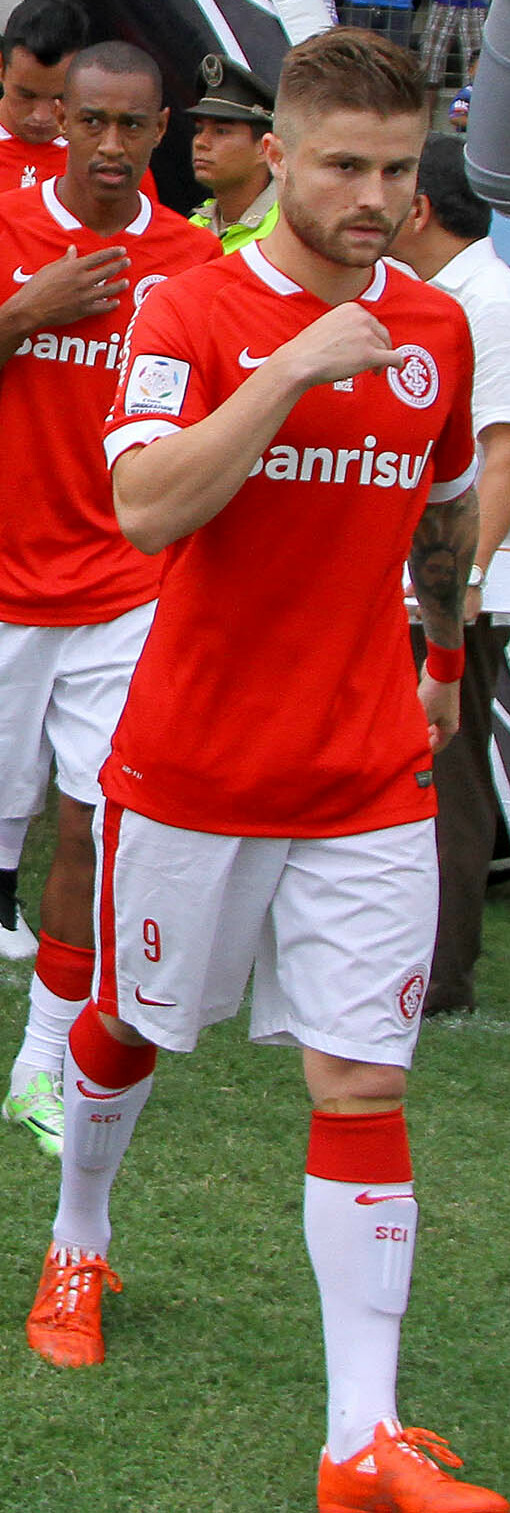
Sasha walking out for Internacional before a Copa Libertadores game against Emelec in March 2015

Sasha scored twice in seven games as the Colorado won the 2014 Campeonato Gaúcho; his first goal for them came on 29 January in a 2–1 home win over São Paulo-RS, three minutes after replacing Valdívia at the Estádio Francisco Stédile. He got another four in 12 games in the ensuing Série A, including two in a 4–2 home win over Coritiba on 28 September.

Internacional won another state championship the following year, with Sasha's contributions including a brace on 4 February in a 4–4 home draw against São José on 4 February 2015. He also got his first goals in continental competition, recording a goal in each game against Universidad de Chile in the second stage of that year's Copa Libertadores.

Sasha was the team's top scorer with six goals in 15 games as Inter won a sixth consecutive state title in 2016; he opened the 3–0 home win over Juventude in the second leg of the final (4–0 aggregate). On the celebration, he grabbed the corner flag and started dancing a debutante ball, eluding fierce rivals Grêmio's 15-year title drought; his dance later prompted to offensive replies by Luan on the 2016 Copa do Brasil and the 2017 Copa Libertadores Finals, both won by Grêmio.

Sasha was a regular starter for Inter during the campaign, as his side suffered relegation for the first time in history. In the following year's promotion season, he also struggled with recurrent ankle injuries.

=== Santos ===
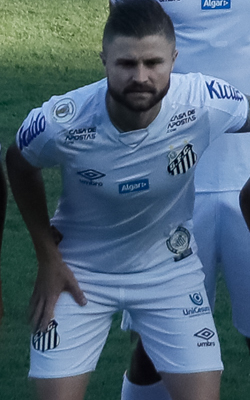
Sasha with Santos in 2019

On 9 January 2018, Sasha joined Santos on loan until December, with a buyout clause. He made his debut for the club on 22 January, coming on as a substitute in a 1–0 Campeonato Paulista home loss against Bragantino.

Sasha scored his first goal for Peixe on 25 January 2018, netting the equalizer in a 2–1 away defeat of Ponte Preta. On 15 March, he scored a brace in a 3–1 home win against Nacional, being also named man of the match.

On 19 April 2018, Sasha signed a permanent contract until 2022, with Zeca moving in the opposite direction. He started the 2019 campaign out of the first-team plans under new manager Jorge Sampaoli, but subsequently established himself as a regular.

On 20 July 2020, Sasha filed a legal action against Santos, alleging unpaid wages, and was declared a free agent eleven days later; the following day, however, the judge himself revoked the decision after being deemed suspect to judge the case.

=== Atlético Mineiro ===
On 17 August 2020, Sasha joined Atlético Mineiro on a four-year contract for a €1.5 million fee.

=== Red Bull Bragantino ===
On 31 March 2023, Sasha joined Red Bull Bragantino on a deal running until December 2025.

== Style of play ==
Upon giving him his first professional contract, Internacional manager Celso Roth said of Sasha:

He is a boy who I have seen distinguishing himself in the reserves, a player with speed. Therefore, he's being added to the squad. He has speed, movement. We hope that, with calmness, with normal conditions, to give him the chance to mature. We have to be calm

== Career statistics ==
As of 28 March 2024

Club	Season	League			State League		Cup		Continental		Other		Total	
Club	Season	Division	Apps	Goals	Apps	Goals	Apps	Goals	Apps	Goals	Apps	Goals	Apps	Goals
Internacional	2010	Série A	2	0	—		—		—		0	0	2	0
Internacional	2011	Série A	0	0	1	0	—		—		—		1	0
Internacional	2012	Série A	0	0	2	0	—		—		—		2	0
Internacional	2014	Série A	12	4	7	2	2	0	1 (Note: Appearance(s) in Copa Sudamericana)	0	—		22	6
Internacional	2015	Série A	14	2	10	3	2	1	12 (Note: Appearance(s) in Copa Libertadores)	2	—		38	8
Internacional	2016	Série A	31	5	16	6	5	1	—		4 (Note: Appearance(s) in Primeira Liga)	1	56	13
Internacional	2017	Série B	26	3	0	0	1	0	—		1	0	28	3
Internacional	Total		85	14	36	11	10	2	13	2	5	1	149	30
Goiás (loan)	2012	Série B	7	0	—		1	0	—		—		8	0
Goiás (loan)	2013	Série A	16	4	21	3	8	3	—		—		45	10
Goiás (loan)	Total		23	4	21	3	9	3	—		—		53	10
Santos	2018	Série A	25	1	14	4	2	0	5	2	—		46	7
Santos	2019	Série A	37	14	5	0	7	0	0	0	—		49	14
Santos	2020	Série A	0	0	8	2	0	0	2	0	—		10	2
Santos	Total		62	15	27	6	9	0	7	2	—		105	23
Atlético Mineiro	2020	Série A	34	9	2	1	—		—		—		36	10
Atlético Mineiro	2021	Série A	23	2	11	1	9	0	7	0	—		50	3
Atlético Mineiro	2022	Série A	27	3	12	5	2	3	6	1	0	0	47	12
Atlético Mineiro	2023	Série A	0	0	4	1	0	0	1	0	—		5	1
Atlético Mineiro	Total		84	14	29	8	11	3	14	1	0	0	138	26
Red Bull Bragantino	2023	Série A	33	11	—		0	0	8	5	—		41	16
Red Bull Bragantino	2024	Série A	0	0	11	6	0	0	4	0	—		15	6
Red Bull Bragantino	Total		33	11	11	6	0	0	12	5	—		56	22
Career total			287	58	124	34	39	8	46	10	5	1	501	111

== Honours ==
Internacional

- Campeonato Gaúcho: 2011, 2014, 2015, 2016

Goiás

- Campeonato Brasileiro Série B: 2012
- Campeonato Goiano: 2013

Atlético Mineiro

- Campeonato Brasileiro Série A: 2021
- Copa do Brasil: 2021
- Campeonato Mineiro: 2020, 2021, 2022
- Supercopa do Brasil: 2022
