= 2015 Copa Libertadores first stage =

The 2015 Copa Libertadores first stage was played from February 3 to February 12, 2015. A total of 12 teams competed in the first stage to decide six of the 32 places in the second stage of the 2015 Copa Libertadores.

== Draw ==
The draw of the tournament was held on December 2, 2014, 21:00 UTC−3, at the CONMEBOL Convention Centre in Luque, Paraguay.

For the first stage, the 12 teams were drawn into six ties containing a team from Pot 1 and a team from Pot 2, with the former hosting the second leg. The seeding of each team was determined by which associations reached the furthest stage in the previous Copa Libertadores.

Pots for the first stage draw
Pot A	Pot B
(Argentina) Huracán; (Argentina) Estudiantes; (Bolivia) The Strongest; (Colombia) Once Caldas; (Paraguay) Cerro Porteño; (Uruguay) Nacional	(Brazil) Corinthians; (Chile) Palestino; (Ecuador) Independiente del Valle; (Mexico) Morelia; (Peru) Alianza Lima; (Venezuela) Deportivo Táchira

== Format ==
In the first stage, each tie was played on a home-and-away two-legged basis. If tied on aggregate, the away goals rule would be used. If still tied, the penalty shoot-out would be used to determine the winner (no extra time would be played). The six winners of the first stage advanced to the second stage to join the 26 automatic qualifiers.

== Matches ==
The first legs were played on February 3–5, and the second legs were played on February 10–12, 2015.

Team 1	Agg.	Team 2	1st leg	2nd leg
Alianza Lima (Peru)	0–4	(Argentina) Huracán	0–4	0–0
Independiente del Valle (Ecuador)	1–4	(Argentina) Estudiantes	1–0	0–4
Deportivo Táchira (Venezuela)	4–3	(Paraguay) Cerro Porteño	2–1	2–2
Morelia (Mexico)	1–3	(Bolivia) The Strongest	1–1	0–2
Palestino (Chile)	2–2 (a)	(Uruguay) Nacional	1–0	1–2
Corinthians (Brazil)	5–1	(Colombia) Once Caldas	4–0	1–1

=== Match G1 ===
February 3, 2015
19:15 UTC−5

Alianza Lima (Peru)	0–4	(Argentina) Huracán
	Report	Ábila 4'; Gamarra 38'; Toranzo 75', 79'

Estadio Alejandro Villanueva, Lima
Referee: Hernando Buitrago (Colombia)

February 10, 2015
19:15 UTC−3

Huracán (Argentina)	0–0	(Peru) Alianza Lima
	Report

Estadio Tomás Adolfo Ducó, Buenos Aires
Referee: Oscar Maldonado (Bolivia)

Huracán won 4–0 on aggregate and advanced to the second stage (Group 3).

=== Match G2 ===
February 5, 2015
20:00 UTC−5

Independiente del Valle (Ecuador)	1–0	(Argentina) Estudiantes
Pineida 79'	Report

Estadio Rumiñahui, Sangolquí
Referee: Roberto García (Mexico)

February 12, 2015
21:45 UTC−3

Estudiantes (Argentina)	4–0	(Ecuador) Independiente del Valle
Desábato 12', 50'; Carrillo 28'; Mina 90+1' (o.g.)	Report

Estadio Ciudad de La Plata, La Plata
Referee: Enrique Osses (Chile)

Estudiantes won 4–1 on aggregate and advanced to the second stage (Group 7).

=== Match G3 ===
February 4, 2015
21:45 UTC−4:30

Deportivo Táchira (Venezuela)	2–1	(Paraguay) Cerro Porteño
López 11'; Rojas 18'	Report	Fabbro 49'

Estadio Polideportivo de Pueblo Nuevo, San Cristóbal
Referee: Víctor Carrillo (Peru)

February 11, 2015
18:30 UTC−3

Cerro Porteño (Paraguay)	2–2	(Venezuela) Deportivo Táchira
Fabbro 39' (pen.); Domínguez 60'	Report	Rivas 55', 61'

Estadio Defensores del Chaco, Asunción
Referee: Leandro Vuaden (Brazil)

Deportivo Táchira won 4–3 on aggregate and advanced to the second stage (Group 8).

=== Match G4 ===
February 3, 2015
20:30 UTC−6

Morelia (Mexico)	1–1	(Bolivia) The Strongest
Depetris 35'	Report	Escobar 8'

Estadio Morelos, Morelia
Referee: Jesús Valenzuela (Venezuela)

February 10, 2015
20:45 UTC−4

The Strongest (Bolivia)	2–0	(Mexico) Morelia
Escobar 85', 88'	Report

Estadio Hernando Siles, La Paz
Referee: Omar Ponce (Ecuador)

The Strongest won 3–1 on aggregate and advanced to the second stage (Group 4).

=== Match G5 ===
February 5, 2015
19:45 UTC−3

Palestino (Chile)	1–0	(Uruguay) Nacional
Rosende 69'	Report

Estadio Santa Laura-Universidad SEK, Independencia
Referee: Antonio Arias (Paraguay)

February 12, 2015
20:15 UTC−2

Nacional (Uruguay)	2–1	(Chile) Palestino
Lanaro 41' (o.g.); Pereiro 44'	Report	Ramos 37'

Estadio Gran Parque Central, Montevideo
Referee: Héber Lopes (Brazil)

Tied 2–2 on aggregate, Palestino won on away goals and advanced to the second stage (Group 5).

=== Match G6 ===
February 4, 2015
22:00 UTC−2

Corinthians (Brazil)	4–0	(Colombia) Once Caldas
Emerson 1'; Felipe 54'; Elias 69'; Fagner 78'	Report

Arena Corinthians, São Paulo
Attendance: 36,236
Referee: Patricio Loustau (Argentina)

February 11, 2015
19:00 UTC−5

Once Caldas (Colombia)	1–1	(Brazil) Corinthians
Arango 57'	Report	Elias 14'

Estadio Palogrande, Manizales
Referee: Darío Ubriaco (Uruguay)

Corinthians won 5–1 on aggregate and advanced to the second stage (Group 2).
