= 2015 Copa Libertadores =

56th season of Copa Libertadores

2015 Copa Bridgestone Libertadores de América

Tournament details
- Dates: February 3 – August 5, 2015
- Teams: 38 (from 11 associations)

Final positions
- Champions: (Argentina) River Plate (3rd title)
- Runners-up: (Mexico) Tigres UANL

Tournament statistics
- Matches played: 138
- Goals scored: 342 (2.48 per match)
- Top scorer: (Argentina) Gustavo Bou (8 goals)
- Best player: (Ecuador) Joffre Guerrón

The 2015 Copa Libertadores de América (officially the 2015 Copa Bridgestone Libertadores for sponsorship reasons) was the 56th edition of the Copa Libertadores de América, South America's premier club football tournament organized by CONMEBOL.

Argentine team River Plate qualified to play in the 2015 FIFA Club World Cup and the 2016 Recopa Sudamericana as the best-placed South American team, before winning the final against Mexican team Tigres UANL 3–0 on aggregate to win their third title. San Lorenzo were the defending champions, but they were eliminated in the group stage.

== Teams ==
The following 38 teams from 11 associations (the 10 CONMEBOL members plus Mexico which were invited to compete) qualified for the tournament:

- Title holders
- Argentina and Brazil: 5 berths each
- All other associations: 3 berths each

The entry stage was determined as follows:

- Second stage: 26 teams (top four teams from Argentina and Brazil, and top two teams from all other associations)
- First stage: 12 teams (team with the lowest berth from each association, plus team with the second lowest berth from association of title holders)

Association	Team (Berth)	Entry stage	Qualification method
(Argentina) Argentina; 5+1 berths	San Lorenzo (Argentina 1; Title holders)	Second stage	2014 Copa Libertadores champion
(Argentina) Argentina; 5+1 berths	River Plate (Argentina 2)	Second stage	2014 Copa Sudamericana champion and 2014 Torneo Final champion
(Argentina) Argentina; 5+1 berths	Racing (Argentina 3)	Second stage	2014 Torneo Transición champion
(Argentina) Argentina; 5+1 berths	Boca Juniors (Argentina 4)	Second stage	2013–14 Primera División aggregate table best team not yet qualified
(Argentina) Argentina; 5+1 berths	Huracán (Argentina 5)	First stage	2013–14 Copa Argentina champion
(Argentina) Argentina; 5+1 berths	Estudiantes (Argentina 6)	First stage	2014 Copa Sudamericana best Argentine team not yet qualified
(Bolivia) Bolivia; 3 berths	Universitario de Sucre (Bolivia 1)	Second stage	2014 Clausura champion
(Bolivia) Bolivia; 3 berths	San José (Bolivia 2)	Second stage	2014 Clausura runner-up
(Bolivia) Bolivia; 3 berths	The Strongest (Bolivia 3)	First stage	2014 Clausura 3rd place
(Brazil) Brazil; 5 berths	Cruzeiro (Brazil 1)	Second stage	2014 Campeonato Brasileiro Série A champion
(Brazil) Brazil; 5 berths	Atlético Mineiro (Brazil 2)	Second stage	2014 Copa do Brasil champion
(Brazil) Brazil; 5 berths	São Paulo (Brazil 3)	Second stage	2014 Campeonato Brasileiro Série A runner-up
(Brazil) Brazil; 5 berths	Internacional (Brazil 4)	Second stage	2014 Campeonato Brasileiro Série A 3rd place
(Brazil) Brazil; 5 berths	Corinthians (Brazil 5)	First stage	2014 Campeonato Brasileiro Série A 4th place
(Chile) Chile; 3 berths	Colo-Colo (Chile 1)	Second stage	2014 Clausura champion
(Chile) Chile; 3 berths	Universidad de Chile (Chile 2)	Second stage	2014 Apertura champion
(Chile) Chile; 3 berths	Palestino (Chile 3)	First stage	2014 Apertura Liguilla winner
(Colombia) Colombia; 3 berths	Atlético Nacional (Colombia 1)	Second stage	2014 Apertura champion
(Colombia) Colombia; 3 berths	Santa Fe (Colombia 2)	Second stage	2014 Finalización champion
(Colombia) Colombia; 3 berths	Once Caldas (Colombia 3)	First stage	2014 Primera A aggregate table best team not yet qualified
(Ecuador) Ecuador; 3 berths	Emelec (Ecuador 1)	Second stage	2014 Serie A champion
(Ecuador) Ecuador; 3 berths	Barcelona (Ecuador 2)	Second stage	2014 Serie A runner-up
(Ecuador) Ecuador; 3 berths	Independiente del Valle (Ecuador 3)	First stage	2014 Serie A aggregate table best team not yet qualified
Mexico (CONCACAF); 3 invitees	Tigres UANL (Mexico 1)	Second stage	2014 Apertura classification table best team not qualified for 2014–15 CONCACAF Champions League
Mexico (CONCACAF); 3 invitees	Atlas (Mexico 2)	Second stage	2014 Apertura classification table 2nd best team not qualified for 2014–15 CONCACAF Champions League
Mexico (CONCACAF); 3 invitees	Morelia (Mexico 3)	First stage	2014 Supercopa MX champion
(Paraguay) Paraguay; 3 berths	Libertad (Paraguay 1)	Second stage	2014 Apertura champion and 2014 Clausura champion
(Paraguay) Paraguay; 3 berths	Guaraní (Paraguay 2)	Second stage	2014 Primera División aggregate table 2nd best team
(Paraguay) Paraguay; 3 berths	Cerro Porteño (Paraguay 3)	First stage	2014 Primera División aggregate table 3rd best team
(Peru) Peru; 3 berths	Sporting Cristal (Peru 1)	Second stage	2014 Descentralizado champion
(Peru) Peru; 3 berths	Juan Aurich (Peru 2)	Second stage	2014 Descentralizado runner-up
(Peru) Peru; 3 berths	Alianza Lima (Peru 3)	First stage	2014 Torneo del Inca champion
(Uruguay) Uruguay; 3 berths	Danubio (Uruguay 1)	Second stage	2013–14 Primera División champion
(Uruguay) Uruguay; 3 berths	Montevideo Wanderers (Uruguay 2)	Second stage	2013–14 Primera División runner-up
(Uruguay) Uruguay; 3 berths	Nacional (Uruguay 3)	First stage	2013–14 Primera División aggregate table best team not yet qualified
(Venezuela) Venezuela; 3 berths	Zamora (Venezuela 1)	Second stage	2013–14 Primera División champion
(Venezuela) Venezuela; 3 berths	Mineros de Guayana (Venezuela 2)	Second stage	2013–14 Primera División runner-up
(Venezuela) Venezuela; 3 berths	Deportivo Táchira (Venezuela 3)	First stage	2013–14 Primera División aggregate table best team not yet qualified

== Draw ==
Location of teams of the 2015 Copa Libertadores from South America.
Location of teams of the 2015 Copa Libertadores from Mexico.

The draw of the tournament was held on December 2, 2014, at the CONMEBOL Convention Centre in Luque, Paraguay.

For the first stage, the 12 teams were drawn into six ties containing a team from Pot 1 and a team from Pot 2, with the former hosting the second leg. The seeding of each team was determined by which associations reached the furthest stage in the previous Copa Libertadores.

Pots for the first stage draw
Pot A	Pot B
(Argentina) Huracán; (Argentina) Estudiantes; (Bolivia) The Strongest; (Colombia) Once Caldas; (Paraguay) Cerro Porteño; (Uruguay) Nacional	(Brazil) Corinthians; (Chile) Palestino; (Ecuador) Independiente del Valle; (Mexico) Morelia; (Peru) Alianza Lima; (Venezuela) Deportivo Táchira

For the second stage, the 32 teams were drawn into eight groups of four containing one team from each of the four seeding pots. The seeding of each team was determined by their association and qualifying berth (as per the rotational agreement established by CONMEBOL, the teams which qualified through berths 1 from Colombia, Ecuador, Peru and Venezuela were seeded into Pot 1 for odd-numbered years, while the teams which qualified through berths 1 from Bolivia, Chile, Paraguay and Uruguay were seeded into Pot 1 for even-numbered years). Teams from the same association in Pots 1 and 2 could not be drawn into the same group. However, a first stage winner, whose identity was not known at the time of the draw, could be drawn into the same group with another team from the same association.

Pots for the second stage draw
Pot 1	Pot 2	Pot 3	Pot 4
(Argentina) San Lorenzo; (Argentina) River Plate; (Brazil) Cruzeiro; (Brazil) Atlético Mineiro; (Colombia) Atlético Nacional; (Ecuador) Emelec; (Peru) Sporting Cristal; (Venezuela) Zamora	(Argentina) Racing; (Argentina) Boca Juniors; (Brazil) São Paulo; (Brazil) Internacional; (Colombia) Santa Fe; (Ecuador) Barcelona; (Peru) Juan Aurich; (Venezuela) Mineros de Guayana	(Bolivia) Universitario de Sucre; (Bolivia) San José; (Chile) Colo-Colo; Universidad de Chile; (Paraguay) Libertad; (Paraguay) Guaraní; (Uruguay) Danubio; (Uruguay) Montevideo Wanderers	(Mexico) Tigres UANL; (Mexico) Atlas; Winner G1; Winner G2; Winner G3; Winner G4; Winner G5; Winner G6

== Schedule ==
The schedule of the competition was as follows (all dates listed were Wednesdays, but matches could also be played on Tuesdays and Thursdays as well). There was a two-month break between the quarterfinals and semifinals due to the 2015 Copa América.

Stage	First leg	Second leg
First stage	February 4	February 11
Second stage	February 18, 25; March 4, 11, 18; April 1, 8, 15, 22	
Round of 16	April 29; May 6	May 6, 13
Quarterfinals	May 20	May 27
Semifinals	July 15	July 22
Finals	July 29	August 5

Notes

1. ^{†} For matches involving teams from Mexico.

== First stage ==
In the first stage, each tie was played on a home-and-away two-legged basis. If tied on aggregate, the away goals rule would be used. If still tied, the penalty shoot-out would be used to determine the winner (no extra time would be played). The six winners of the first stage advanced to the second stage to join the 26 automatic qualifiers.

Team 1	Agg.	Team 2	1st leg	2nd leg
Alianza Lima (Peru)	0–4	(Argentina) Huracán	0–4	0–0
Independiente del Valle (Ecuador)	1–4	(Argentina) Estudiantes	1–0	0–4
Deportivo Táchira (Venezuela)	4–3	(Paraguay) Cerro Porteño	2–1	2–2
Morelia (Mexico)	1–3	(Bolivia) The Strongest	1–1	0–2
Palestino (Chile)	2–2 (a)	(Uruguay) Nacional	1–0	1–2
Corinthians (Brazil)	5–1	(Colombia) Once Caldas	4–0	1–1

== Second stage ==
In the second stage, each group was played on a home-and-away round-robin basis. The teams were ranked according to points (3 points for a win, 1 point for a draw, 0 points for a loss). If tied on points, tiebreakers were applied in the following order: 1. Goal difference; 2. Goals scored; 3. Away goals scored; 4. Drawing of lots. The winners and runners-up of each group advanced to the round of 16.

=== Group 1 ===
Pos	Team	Pld	W	D	L	GF	GA	GD	Pts	Qualification	SFE	CAM	CCL	ATL
1	(Colombia) Santa Fe	6	4	0	2	10	5	+5	12	Advance to final stages	—	0–1	3–1	3–1
2	(Brazil) Atlético Mineiro	6	3	0	3	5	4	+1	9	Advance to final stages	2–0	—	2–0	0–1
3	(Chile) Colo-Colo	6	3	0	3	8	9	−1	9		0–3	2–0	—	2–0
4	(Mexico) Atlas	6	2	0	4	4	9	−5	6		0–1	1–0	1–3	—

Source: CONMEBOL

=== Group 2 ===
Pos	Team	Pld	W	D	L	GF	GA	GD	Pts	Qualification	COR	SPA	SLA	DAN
1	(Brazil) Corinthians	6	4	1	1	9	3	+6	13	Advance to final stages	—	2–0	0–0	4–0
2	(Brazil) São Paulo	6	4	0	2	9	4	+5	12	Advance to final stages	2–0	—	1–0	4–0
3	(Argentina) San Lorenzo	6	2	1	3	3	4	−1	7		0–1	1–0	—	0–1
4	(Uruguay) Danubio	6	1	0	5	4	14	−10	3		1–2	1–2	1–2	—

Source: CONMEBOL

=== Group 3 ===
Pos	Team	Pld	W	D	L	GF	GA	GD	Pts	Qualification	CRU	UNI	HUR	MIN
1	(Brazil) Cruzeiro	6	3	2	1	8	3	+5	11	Advance to final stages	—	2–0	0–0	3–0
2	(Bolivia) Universitario de Sucre	6	2	3	1	4	3	+1	9	Advance to final stages	0–0	—	0–0	2–0
3	(Argentina) Huracán	6	1	4	1	6	7	−1	7		3–1	1–1	—	2–2
4	(Venezuela) Mineros de Guayana	6	1	1	4	5	10	−5	4		0–2	0–1	3–0	—

Source: CONMEBOL

=== Group 4 ===
Pos	Team	Pld	W	D	L	GF	GA	GD	Pts	Qualification	INT	EME	STR	UCH
1	(Brazil) Internacional	6	4	1	1	13	7	+6	13	Advance to final stages	—	3–2	1–0	3–1
2	(Ecuador) Emelec	6	3	1	2	9	5	+4	10	Advance to final stages	1–1	—	3–0	2–0
3	(Bolivia) The Strongest	6	3	0	3	10	11	−1	9		3–1	1–0	—	5–3
4	Universidad de Chile	6	1	0	5	7	16	−9	3		0–4	0–1	3–1	—

Source: CONMEBOL

=== Group 5 ===
Pos	Team	Pld	W	D	L	GF	GA	GD	Pts	Qualification	BOC	WAN	PAL	ZAM
1	(Argentina) Boca Juniors	6	6	0	0	19	2	+17	18	Advance to final stages	—	2–1	2–0	5–0
2	(Uruguay) Montevideo Wanderers	6	3	1	2	9	8	+1	10	Advance to final stages	0–3	—	1–0	3–2
3	(Chile) Palestino	6	2	1	3	6	6	0	7		0–2	1–1	—	4–0
4	(Venezuela) Zamora	6	0	0	6	3	21	−18	0		1–5	0–3	0–1	—

Source: CONMEBOL

=== Group 6 ===
Pos	Team	Pld	W	D	L	GF	GA	GD	Pts	Qualification	TIG	RIV	JUA	SJO
1	(Mexico) Tigres UANL	6	4	2	0	16	7	+9	14	Advance to final stages	—	2–2	3–0	4–0
2	(Argentina) River Plate	6	1	4	1	8	7	+1	7	Advance to final stages	1–1	—	1–1	3–0
3	(Peru) Juan Aurich	6	1	3	2	9	11	−2	6		4–5	1–1	—	2–0
4	(Bolivia) San José	6	1	1	4	3	11	−8	4		0–1	2–0	1–1	—

Source: CONMEBOL

=== Group 7 ===
Pos	Team	Pld	W	D	L	GF	GA	GD	Pts	Qualification	CAN	EST	LIB	BAR
1	(Colombia) Atlético Nacional	6	3	2	1	12	7	+5	11	Advance to final stages	—	1–1	4–0	2–3
2	(Argentina) Estudiantes	6	3	1	2	7	3	+4	10	Advance to final stages	0–1	—	1–0	3–0
3	(Paraguay) Libertad	6	2	2	2	5	8	−3	8		2–2	1–0	—	1–1
4	(Ecuador) Barcelona	6	1	1	4	5	11	−6	4		1–2	0–2	0–1	—

Source: CONMEBOL

=== Group 8 ===
Pos	Team	Pld	W	D	L	GF	GA	GD	Pts	Qualification	RAC	GUA	CRI	TAC
1	(Argentina) Racing	6	4	0	2	15	7	+8	12	Advance to final stages	—	4–1	1–2	3–2
2	(Paraguay) Guaraní	6	2	3	1	12	10	+2	9	Advance to final stages	2–0	—	2–2	5–2
3	(Peru) Sporting Cristal	6	1	4	1	6	7	−1	7		0–2	1–1	—	1–1
4	(Venezuela) Deportivo Táchira	6	0	3	3	6	15	−9	3		0–5	1–1	0–0	—

Source: CONMEBOL

== Final stages ==
In the final stages, the 16 teams played a single-elimination tournament, with the following rules:

- Each tie was played on a home-and-away two-legged basis, with the higher-seeded team hosting the second leg. However, CONMEBOL required that the second leg of the finals had to be played in South America, i.e., if there was a finalist from Mexico, they would have to host the first leg regardless of seeding.
- In the round of 16, quarterfinals, and semifinals, if tied on aggregate, the away goals rule would be used. If still tied, the penalty shoot-out would be used to determine the winner (no extra time would be played).
- In the finals, if tied on aggregate, the away goals rule would not be used, and 30 minutes of extra time would be played. If still tied after extra time, the penalty shoot-out would be used to determine the winner.
- If there were two semifinalists from the same association, they would have to play each other.

=== Seeding ===
The qualified teams were seeded in the final stages according to their results in the second stage, with the group winners seeded 1–8, and the group runners-up seeded 9–16.

Seed	Grp	Team	Pld	W	D	L	GF	GA	GD	Pts
1	5	(Argentina) Boca Juniors	6	6	0	0	19	2	+17	18
2	6	(Mexico) Tigres UANL	6	4	2	0	16	7	+9	14
3	4	(Brazil) Internacional	6	4	1	1	13	7	+6	13
4	2	(Brazil) Corinthians	6	4	1	1	9	3	+6	13
5	8	(Argentina) Racing	6	4	0	2	15	7	+8	12
6	1	(Colombia) Santa Fe	6	4	0	2	10	5	+5	12
7	7	(Colombia) Atlético Nacional	6	3	2	1	12	7	+5	11
8	3	(Brazil) Cruzeiro	6	3	2	1	8	3	+5	11
9	2	(Brazil) São Paulo	6	4	0	2	9	4	+5	12
10	4	(Ecuador) Emelec	6	3	1	2	9	5	+4	10
11	7	(Argentina) Estudiantes	6	3	1	2	7	3	+4	10
12	5	(Uruguay) Montevideo Wanderers	6	3	1	2	9	8	+1	10
13	8	(Paraguay) Guaraní	6	2	3	1	12	10	+2	9
14	1	(Brazil) Atlético Mineiro	6	3	0	3	5	4	+1	9
15	3	(Bolivia) Universitario de Sucre	6	2	3	1	4	3	+1	9
16	6	(Argentina) River Plate	6	1	4	1	8	7	+1	7

Source: CONMEBOL
Rules for classification: 1) Higher position in group; 2) Points; 3) Goal difference; 4) Goals scored; 5) Away goals scored; 6) Drawing of lots.

=== Bracket ===
Round of 16
11	(Argentina) Estudiantes	2	0	2
6	(Colombia) Santa Fe	1	2	3
14	(Brazil) Atlético Mineiro	2	1	3
3	(Brazil) Internacional	2	3	5
10	(Ecuador) Emelec	2	0	2
7	(Colombia) Atlético Nacional	0	1	1
15	(Bolivia) Universitario de Sucre	1	1	2
2	(Mexico) Tigres UANL	2	1	3
16	(Argentina) River Plate	1	0	1
1	(Argentina) Boca Juniors (DQ)	0	0	0
9	(Brazil) São Paulo	1	0	1 (3)
8	(Brazil) Cruzeiro (p)	0	1	1 (4)
13	(Paraguay) Guaraní	2	1	3
4	(Brazil) Corinthians	0	0	0
12	(Uruguay) Montevideo Wanderers	1	1	2
5	(Argentina) Racing	1	2	3

Quarterfinals
6	(Colombia) Santa Fe	1	0	1
3	(Brazil) Internacional	0	2	2
10	(Ecuador) Emelec	1	0	1
2	(Mexico) Tigres UANL	0	2	2
16	(Argentina) River Plate	0	3	3
8	(Brazil) Cruzeiro	1	0	1
13	(Paraguay) Guaraní	1	0	1
5	(Argentina) Racing	0	0	0

Semifinals
3	(Brazil) Internacional	2	1	3
2	(Mexico) Tigres UANL	1	3	4
16	(Argentina) River Plate	2	1	3
13	(Paraguay) Guaraní	0	1	1

Finals
2	(Mexico) Tigres UANL	0	0	0
16	(Argentina) River Plate	0	3	3

=== Round of 16 ===
Team 1	Agg.	Team 2	1st leg	2nd leg
River Plate (Argentina)	1–0	(Argentina) Boca Juniors	1–0	0–0 (susp.)
Universitario de Sucre (Bolivia)	2–3	(Mexico) Tigres UANL	1–2	1–1
Atlético Mineiro (Brazil)	3–5	(Brazil) Internacional	2–2	1–3
Guaraní (Paraguay)	3–0	(Brazil) Corinthians	2–0	1–0
Montevideo Wanderers (Uruguay)	2–3	(Argentina) Racing	1–1	1–2
Estudiantes (Argentina)	2–3	(Colombia) Santa Fe	2–1	0–2
Emelec (Ecuador)	2–1	(Colombia) Atlético Nacional	2–0	0–1
São Paulo (Brazil)	1–1 (3–4 p)	(Brazil) Cruzeiro	1–0	0–1

Notes

1. The second leg of Boca Juniors against River Plate was suspended after River Plate players were attacked with pepper spray by Boca Juniors fans when the squad returned to the field following halftime, with the match still 0–0 (River Plate leading 1–0 on aggregate). CONMEBOL opened disciplinary proceedings against Boca Juniors, and decided to disqualify them from the tournament on May 16, 2015.

=== Quarterfinals ===
Team 1	Agg.	Team 2	1st leg	2nd leg
River Plate (Argentina)	3–1	(Brazil) Cruzeiro	0–1	3–0
Emelec (Ecuador)	1–2	(Mexico) Tigres UANL	1–0	0–2
Santa Fe (Colombia)	1–2	(Brazil) Internacional	1–0	0–2
Guaraní (Paraguay)	1–0	(Argentina) Racing	1–0	0–0

=== Semifinals ===
Team 1	Agg.	Team 2	1st leg	2nd leg
River Plate (Argentina)	3–1	(Paraguay) Guaraní	2–0	1–1
Internacional (Brazil)	3–4	(Mexico) Tigres UANL	2–1	1–3

=== Finals ===
The finals were played on a home-and-away two-legged basis. If tied on aggregate, the away goals rule would not be used, and 30 minutes of extra time would be played. If still tied after extra time, the penalty shoot-out would be used to determine the winner.

Since Tigres UANL are not a South American club, by rule they had to host the first leg regardless of seeding.

July 29, 2015
20:00 UTC−5

Tigres UANL (Mexico)	0–0	(Argentina) River Plate
	Report

Estadio Universitario, San Nicolás de los Garza
Attendance: 40,000
Referee: Antonio Arias (Paraguay)

August 5, 2015
22:00 UTC−3

River Plate (Argentina)	3–0	(Mexico) Tigres UANL
Alario 44'; Sánchez 74' (pen.); Funes Mori 78'	Report

Estadio Antonio Vespucio Liberti, Buenos Aires
Attendance: 69,000
Referee: Darío Ubriaco (Uruguay)

== Statistics ==
=== Top goalscorers ===
Rank	Player	Team	Goals
1	(Argentina) Gustavo Bou	(Argentina) Racing	8
2	(Argentina) Guido Carrillo	(Argentina) Estudiantes	7
3	(Ecuador) Miler Bolaños	(Ecuador) Emelec	6
3	(Paraguay) Federico Santander	(Paraguay) Guaraní	6
5	(Chile) Esteban Paredes	(Chile) Colo-Colo	5
5	(Brazil) Valdívia	(Brazil) Internacional	5
7	(Argentina) Ramón Ábila	(Argentina) Huracán	4
7	(Argentina) Andrés D'Alessandro	(Brazil) Internacional	4
7	(Brazil) Elias	(Brazil) Corinthians	4
7	(Bolivia) Pablo Daniel Escobar	(Bolivia) The Strongest	4
7	(Mexico) Enrique Esqueda	(Mexico) Tigres UANL	4
7	(Paraguay) Fernando Fernández	(Paraguay) Guaraní	4
7	(Peru) Paolo Guerrero	(Brazil) Corinthians	4
7	(Ecuador) Joffre Guerrón	(Mexico) Tigres UANL	4
7	(Brazil) Leandro Damião	(Brazil) Cruzeiro	4
7	(Argentina) Diego Milito	(Argentina) Racing	4
7	(Uruguay) Rodrigo Mora	(Argentina) River Plate	4
7	(Colombia) Wilson Morelo	(Colombia) Santa Fe	4
7	(Uruguay) Carlos Sánchez	(Argentina) River Plate	4
7	(Brazil) Rafael Sóbis	(Mexico) Tigres UANL	4
7	(Colombia) Luis Carlos Ruiz	(Colombia) Atlético Nacional	4
7	(Colombia) Zamir Valoyes	(Venezuela) Mineros	4

Source: CONMEBOL.com

=== Team of the Season ===
Team of the Season
Position	Player	Team
Goalkeeper	(Argentina) Marcelo Barovero	(Argentina) River Plate
Defenders	(Argentina) Ramiro Funes Mori	(Argentina) River Plate
Defenders	(Argentina) Jonatan Maidana	(Argentina) River Plate
Defenders	(Mexico) Hugo Ayala	(Mexico) Tigres UANL
Midfielders	(Argentina) Andrés D'Alessandro	(Brazil) Internacional
Midfielders	(Argentina) Matías Kranevitter	(Argentina) River Plate
Midfielders	(Uruguay) Egidio Arévalo	(Mexico) Tigres UANL
Midfielders	(Uruguay) Carlos Sánchez	(Argentina) River Plate
Forwards	(Uruguay) Rodrigo Mora	(Argentina) River Plate
Forwards	(Argentina) Gustavo Bou	(Argentina) Racing Club
Forwards	(Paraguay) Federico Santander	(Paraguay) Guaraní

== See also ==
- 2015 FIFA Club World Cup
- 2015 Copa Sudamericana
- 2016 Recopa Sudamericana
