= Yulián Mejía =

Colombian footballer (born 1990)

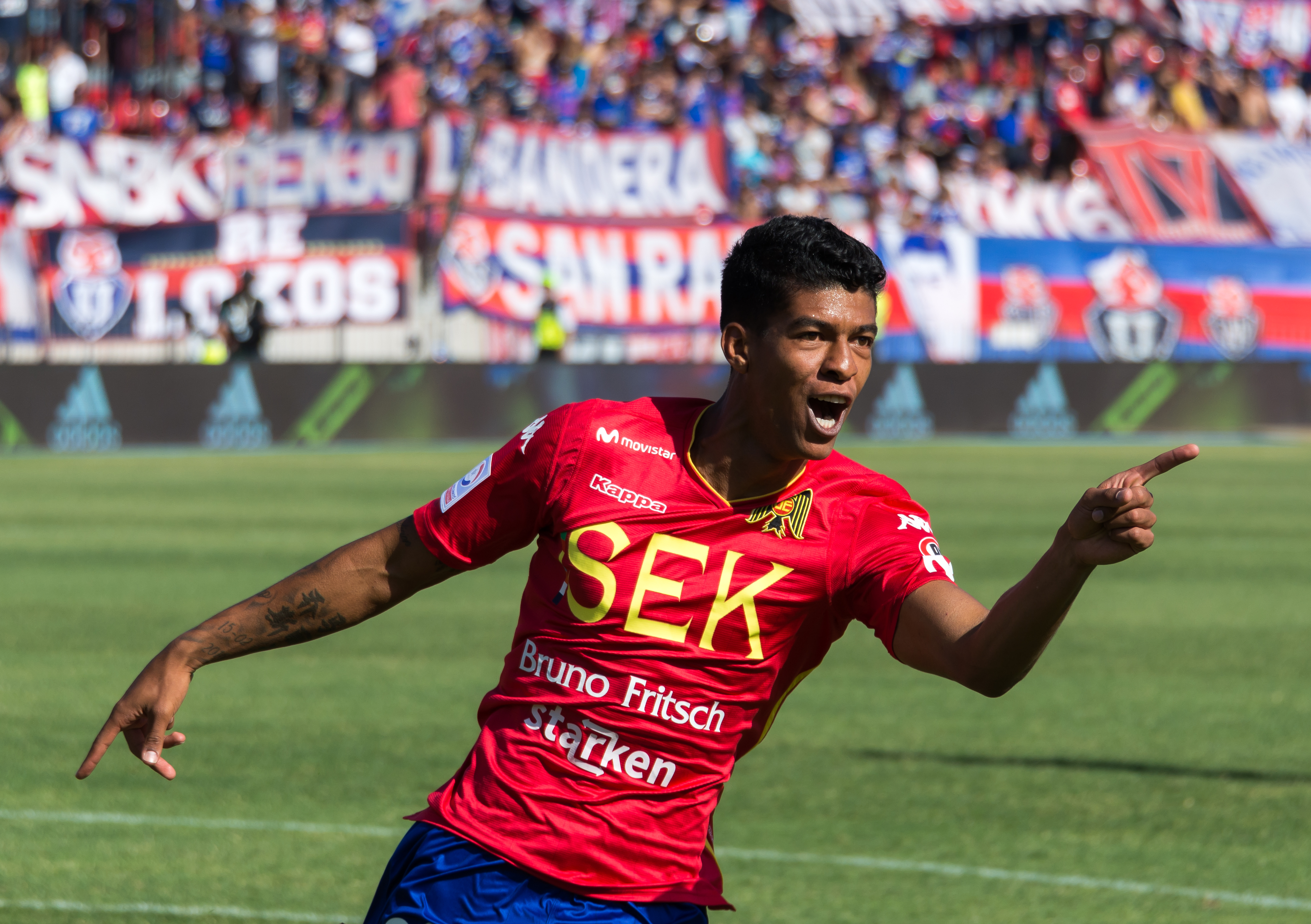

Personal information
- Full name: Jonathan Yulián Mejía Chaverra
- Date of birth: 28 July 1990 (age 36)
- Place of birth: Medellín, Colombia
- Height: 1.84 m (6 ft 0 in)
- Position: Midfielder

Team information
- Current team: Unión Española
- Number: 20

Senior career*
| Years | Team | Apps | (Gls) |
| 2008–2009 | Girardot F.C. | 6 | (0) |
| 2010 | Depor F.C. | 24 | (7) |
| 2011–2012 | Envigado | 70 | (9) |
| 2012–2013 | Club Atlético Tigre | 1 | (0) |
| 2013 | Envigado | 1 | (0) |
| 2013–2014 | Independiente Medellín | 31 | (6) |
| 2014 | Deportes Tolima | 13 | (3) |
| 2015–2018 | Atlético Nacional | 20 | (1) |
| 2016 | → Millonarios FC (loan) | 14 | (1) |
| 2017 | → Atlético Bucaramanga (loan) | 37 | (4) |
| 2018 | → Sporting Cristal (loan) | 35 | (5) |
| 2019– | Unión Española | 20 | (3) |
- * Club domestic league appearances and goals as of 15 January 2020 ‡ National team caps and goals as of 20 September 2016

Jonathan Yulián Mejía Chaverra (born 28 July 1990) is a Colombian professional footballer who plays as a midfielder.

== Career ==
Mejia began his career with Girardot FC in 2008. In 2010, he was signed by Depor FC. In 2011 he was signed by Envigado, where he participated in the 2012 Copa Sudamericana.

His performances for Envigado impressed many South American clubs, particularly Millonarios and Racing Club. In February 2013 Racing were very close to signing him, but the deal eventually fell through and he joined Tigre. However, opportunities were limited for him at Tigre, and he joined Independiente Medellin later that year.

In May 2014, he joined Deportes Tolima, where he was part of the squad that won the 2014 Copa Colombia.

In February 2015 he joined Atlético Nacional. He was part of the squad that was champion in the 2015 Finalizacion tournament.

In 2016 he signed with Millonarios on loan, and they eventually decided not to use their buy option. The following year he played with Atletico Bucaramanga, and in 2018 he joined Sporting Cristal of the Peruvian Primera División.

In 2019 he joined Unión Española of Chile. In 2021, his contract was terminated due to a long-term injury.

== Honours ==
=== Club ===
Deportes Tolima

- Copa Colombia: 2014

Atlético Nacional

- Categoría Primera A: 2015-II
