= Matías Santos =

Uruguayan footballer (born 1994)

Personal information
- Full name: Matías Joaquín Santos Arostegui
- Date of birth: 11 March 1994 (age 32)
- Place of birth: Montevideo, Uruguay
- Height: 1.78 m (5 ft 10 in)
- Position: Midfielder

Team information
- Current team: Deportes Santa Cruz
- Number: 26

Youth career
- Montevideo Wanderers

Senior career*
Years	Team	Apps	(Gls)
2012–2017	Montevideo Wanderers	105	(16)
2017–2018	Veracruz	0	(0)
2018	Deportivo Pasto	0	(0)
2018–2019	Defensor Sporting	12	(2)
2019	Nueva Chicago	2	(0)
2020–2022	Montevideo City Torque	30	(2)
2021	→ Universidad de Concepción (loan)	23	(4)
2023	Colón FC	–	(–)
2024–	Deportes Santa Cruz	10	(3)
- * Club domestic league appearances and goals as of 3 May 2024

Matías Joaquín Santos Arostegui (born 11 March 1994) is a Uruguayan footballer who plays as a midfielder for Chilean club Deportes Santa Cruz.

== Career ==
Besides Uruguay, Santos has played in Mexico, Colombia, Argentina and Chile.

In Mexico, he had a stint with Veracruz in 2017–18.

In Colombia, he joined Deportivo Pasto in 2018.

In Argentina, he played for Nueva Chicago in 2019.

In Chile, he played for Universidad de Concepción on loan from Montevideo City Torque in 2021. In 2024, he joined Deportes Santa Cruz.
