= Ely Esterilla =

Ecuadorian footballer (born 1993)

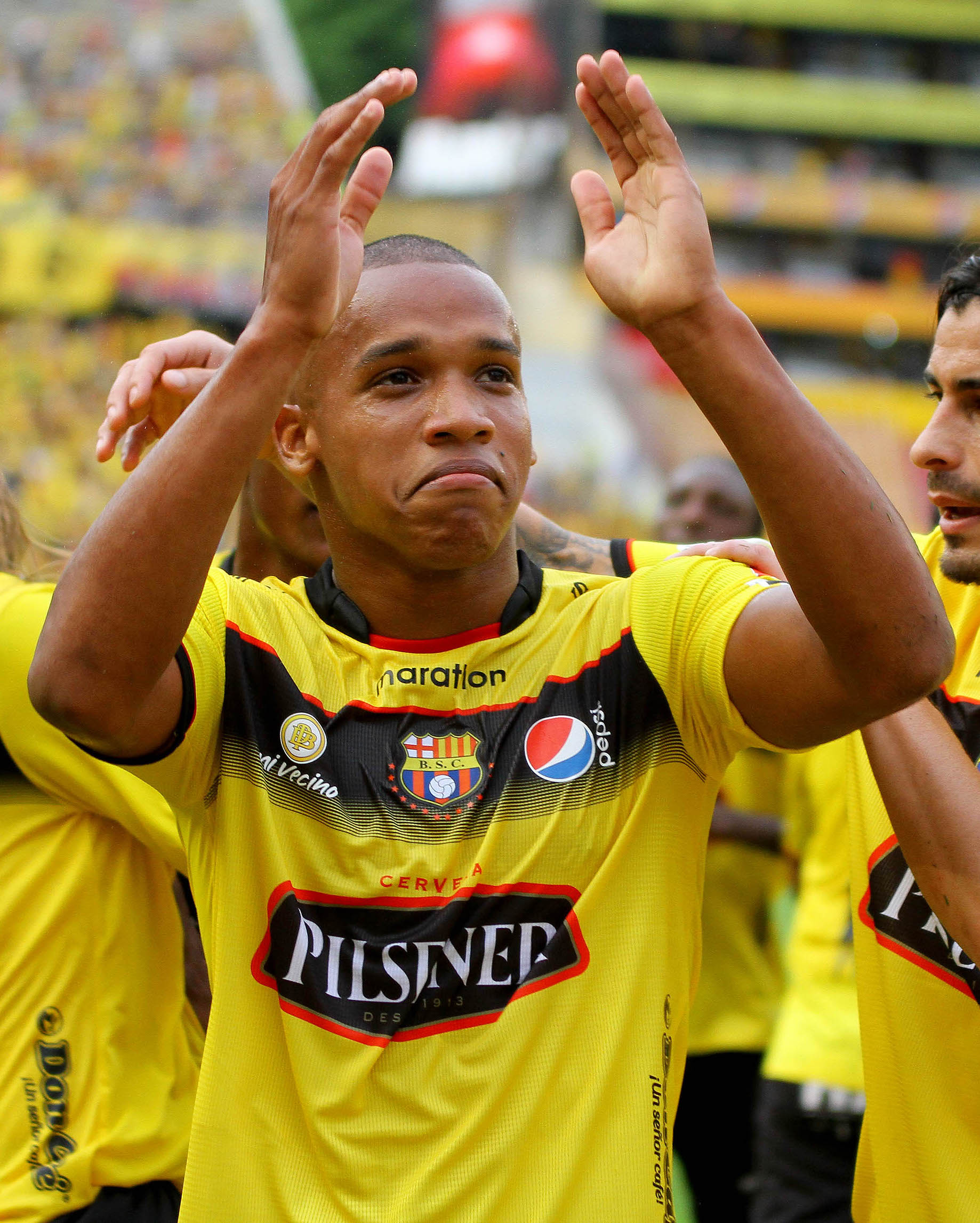

Personal information
- Full name: Ely Jair Esterilla Castro
- Date of birth: 6 February 1993 (age 33)
- Place of birth: Guayaquil, Ecuador
- Height: 1.77 m (5 ft 9 1/2 in)
- Position: Forward

Team information
- Current team: 9 de Octubre

Youth career
- 2005–2011: Rocafuerte
- 2012–2013: Santos Laguna

Senior career*
Years	Team	Apps	(Gls)
2010–2012	Rocafuerte	1	(1)
2014–	Barcelona SC	210	(34)
2020	→ CD Cuenca (loan)	3	(0)
2021–	Olmedo	0	(0)

International career
2013	Ecuador U-20	9	(4)
- * Club domestic league appearances and goals as of 28 November 2018

Ely Jair Esterilla Castro (born 6 February 1993) is an Ecuadorian professional footballer who plays as a forward for 9 de Octubre.

== Club career ==
=== Rocafuerte ===
Born in Guayaquil, Esterilla joined Rocafuerte's youth setup in 2005. He made his first team debut in the 2010 campaign, in Serie B.

=== Santos Laguna ===
On 3 June 2012, Esterilla moved abroad and joined Liga MX side Santos Laguna, being assigned to the under-20 squad. He never appeared with the main squad during his spell, but won the 2013 Clausura tournament with the under-20s.

=== Barcelona SC ===
On 19 December 2013, Esterilla returned to his home country and joined Barcelona on a four-year contract. He made his professional debut the following 29 January, coming on as a second-half substitute for Federico Laurito in a 1–0 Serie A home win against Manta.

Esterilla scored his first professional goal on 13 April 2014, netting his team's second in a 2–0 home defeat of Independiente del Valle. On 27 March 2016, he scored a brace in a 5–0 home routing of L.D.U. Quito.

== International career ==
Esterilla represented Ecuador at under-20 level, playing in the 2013 South American Youth Football Championship. On 2 October 2015, he was called up by the full side for two 2018 FIFA World Cup qualifiers against Uruguay and Venezuela, but withdrew due to injury three days later.

== Career statistics ==
As of 18 January 2019

Club	Season	League			Cup		Continental		Other		Total	
Club	Season	Division	Apps	Goals	Apps	Goals	Apps	Goals	Apps	Goals	Apps	Goals
Rocafuerte	2010	Serie B	1	0	—		—		—		1	0
Rocafuerte	2011	Serie B	10	0	—		—		—		10	0
Rocafuerte	2012	Serie B	8	2	—		—		—		8	2
Rocafuerte	Subtotal		19	2	—		—		—		19	2
Barcelona	20145	Serie A	37	6	—		3 (Note: Appearance(s) in Copa Sudamericana)	0	—		40	6
Barcelona	2015	Serie A	31	7	—		5 (Note: Appearance(s) in Copa Libertadores)	2	—		36	9
Barcelona	2016	Serie A	38	11	—		2	0	—		40	11
Barcelona	2017	Serie A	27	1	—		8	0	—		35	1
Barcelona	2018	Serie A	34	4	—		2	0	—		36	4
Barcelona	Subtotal		167	29	—		20	2	—		73	8
Career total			186	31	0	0	20	2	0	0	206	33
