= Yamilson Rivera =

Colombian footballer (born 1989)

Personal information
- Full name: Yamilson Alexis Rivera Hurtado
- Date of birth: 18 June 1989 (age 37)
- Place of birth: Tumaco, Nariño, Colombia
- Height: 1.73 m (5 ft 8 in)
- Position: Right winger

Youth career
- Cúcuta Deportivo

Senior career*
Years	Team	Apps	(Gls)
2008–2009	Cúcuta Deportivo		
2009	América de Cali		
2010	Cúcuta Deportivo	2	(0)
2011	Unión Magdalena	9	(0)
2012–2014	América de Cali	82	(34)
2014	Club León	9	(2)
2015	→ Santa Fe (loan)	11	(0)
2015–2016	Mineros de Zacatecas	26	(5)
2017	Deportivo Pasto	17	(8)
2017	Santa Fe	8	(1)
2018	América de Cali	8	(0)
2019	Real Cartagena	11	(2)
2019	Envigado	5	(0)
- * Club domestic league appearances and goals

Yamilson Alexis Rivera Hurtado (born June 18, 1989), known as Yamilson Rivera, is a professional Colombian footballer who plays for Envigado.
