= Fernando Fernández (Paraguayan footballer) =

Paraguayan footballer (born 1992)

Personal information
- Full name: Fernando Fabián Fernández Acosta
- Date of birth: 8 January 1992 (age 34)
- Place of birth: Capiatá, Paraguay
- Height: 1.80 m (5 ft 11 in)
- Position: Striker

Team information
- Current team: Guaraní
- Number: 40

Youth career
- Martín Ledesma
- 2005–2012: Guaraní

Senior career*
Years	Team	Apps	(Gls)
2013–2015	Guaraní	98	(67)
2016–2021	Tigres UANL	12	(1)
2017	→ Olimpia (loan)	10	(1)
2017	→ América de Cali (loan)	14	(3)
2018–2019	→ Atlante (loan)	41	(16)
2019–2021	→ Guaraní (loan)	28	(12)
2022–2023	Guaraní	42	(21)
2023–2024	Cerro Porteño	58	(14)
2025–	Guaraní	26	(11)

International career
2015–	Paraguay	0	(0)
- * Club domestic league appearances and goals as of 12 August 2025

Fernando Fabián Fernández Acosta (born 8 January 1992) is a Paraguayan professional footballer who plays as a striker for Guaraní.

== Career ==
Fernando began its journey from very small to become a player in football school called Cooperative Capiatá, later to move to Martín Ledesma their city natal. At the age of 13 years came to Guaraní, through each of the smaller categories before making his debut in the First Division in 2013.

In December 2015, Fernández was transferred to Mexican side Tigres UANL. On 24 January 2016, he scored his first goal with Tigres in a 2–2 draw against Chivas de Guadalajara at the Estadio Omnilife.

On 27 January 2017, Tigres announced that Fernández had been transferred to Club Olimpia in a 6-month loan deal.

== Honours ==
UANL

- Liga MX: Apertura 2016
- Campeón de Campeones: 2016

== See also ==
- Players and Records in Paraguayan Football
