= Valdívia (Brazilian footballer) =

Brazilian footballer (born 1994)

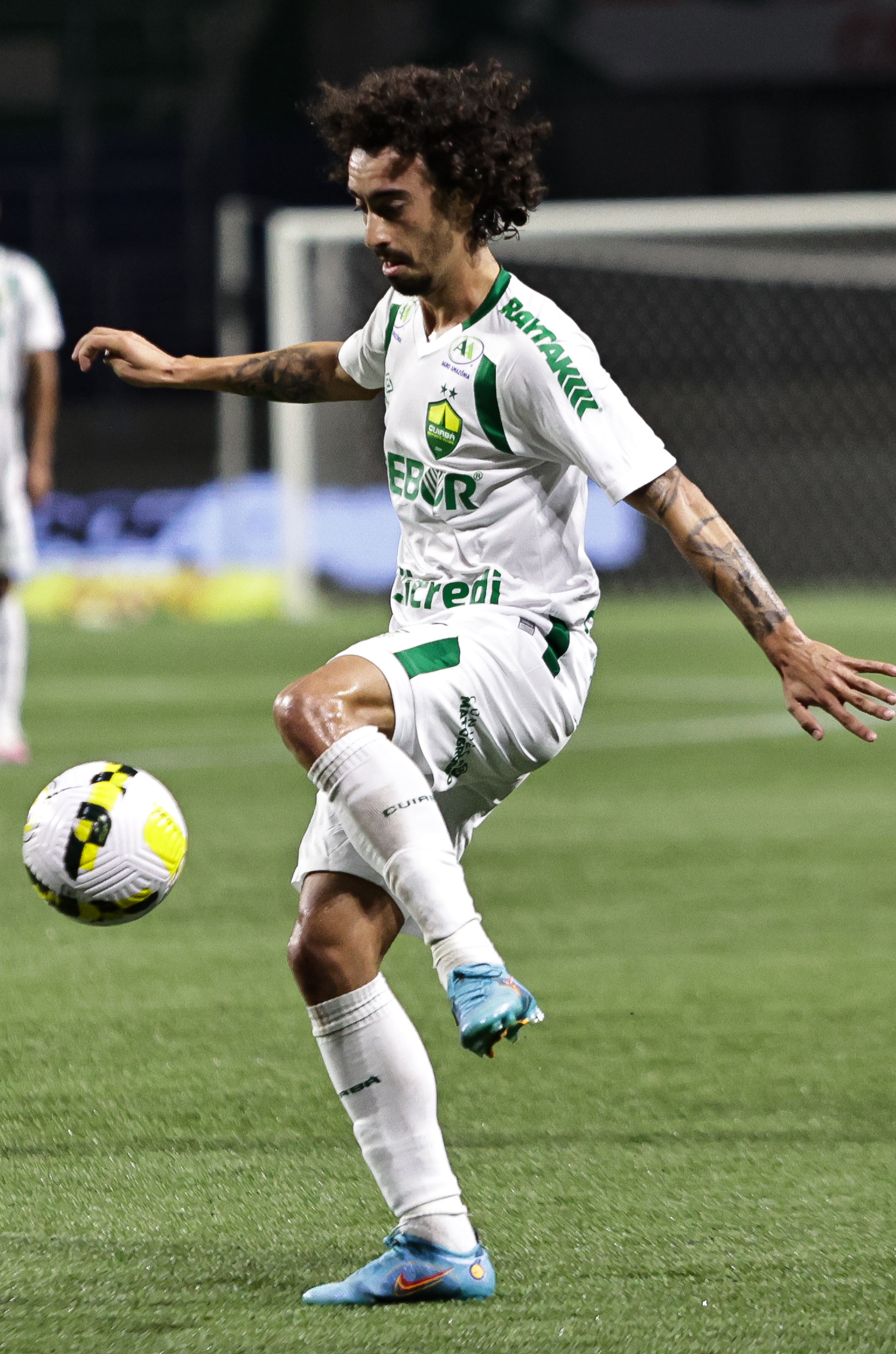
- Valdívia with Cuiabá in 2022

Personal information
- Full name: Wanderson Ferreira de Oliveira
- Date of birth: 4 October 1994 (age 32)
- Place of birth: Jaciara, Brazil
- Height: 1.74 m (5 ft 8 1/2 in)
- Position: Attacking midfielder

Team information
- Current team: Jeonnam Dragons
- Number: 10

Youth career
- 2007–2012: Rondonópolis
- 2012–2013: Internacional

Senior career*
Years	Team	Apps	(Gls)
2013–2020	Internacional	116	(19)
2017	→ Atlético Mineiro (loan)	28	(2)
2018	→ São Paulo (loan)	13	(0)
2018	→ Al-Ittihad (loan)	8	(1)
2019	→ Vasco da Gama (loan)	12	(0)
2020	→ Avaí (loan)	44	(7)
2021	Avaí	46	(2)
2022	Cuiabá	40	(4)
2023–	Jeonnam Dragons	122	(48)

International career
2015	Brazil U23	4	(1)
- * Club domestic league appearances and goals as of 8 August 2026

Wanderson Ferreira de Oliveira (born 4 October 1994), commonly known as Valdívia, is a Brazilian footballer who plays as an attacking midfielder for Jeonnam Dragons.

== Early life ==
Born in Jaciara, Mato Grosso, Valdívia played futsal until the age of 12. He subsequently moved to Rondonópolis and joined Rondonópolis Esporte Clube's youth setup.

== Club career ==
=== Internacional ===
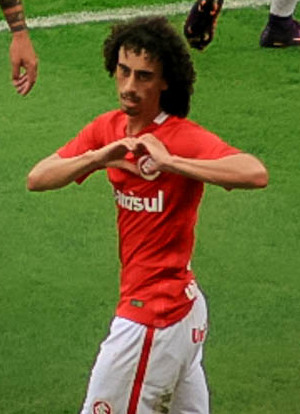
Valdívia with Internacional in 2016

On 15 March 2012, after being the year's Copa São Paulo de Futebol Júnior top goalscorer, Valdívia was signed by Internacional. Initially with the under-20s, he made his Série A debut on 6 October 2013, coming on as a second-half substitute for fellow youth graduate Otávio in a 1–0 home win against Fluminense.

After appearing rarely at the 2014 Campeonato Gaúcho, Valdívia was an important unit for the club during that year's Brasileirão, but was used mainly as a substitute; in July, already definitely promoted, he signed a new contract until 2018. He scored his first professional goal on 12 October, the winner in a 2–1 success over Fluminense also at the Beira-Rio.

During the 2015 campaign, Valdívia was one of Internacional's main assets, scoring the most goals among midfielders in Brazil with 19 goals including five goals at the 2015 Copa Libertadores. He was evaluated as the biggest contributor to the club's victory at the Gauchão that year, being named the best player of the competition. On 24 September, he further extended his contract for six more months. Despite these performances, he suffered a left knee injury in November, having to stop the upturn.

=== Jeonnam Dragons ===
Since 2017, Valdívia wandered several clubs including Saudi Pro League club Al-Ittihad. On 7 January 2023, he signed for K League 2 club Jeonnam Dragons, beginning a new challenge in South Korea. During his first season at Jeonnam, he held the record for most assists in a single K League 2 season with 14 assists, as well as scoring 14 goals. At the end of the season, he was named the K League 2 Most Valuable Player, and received various offers from K League 1 clubs. Satisfied with a life at Jeonnam, he rejected their offers in order to extend his contract with Jeonnam. He was nicknamed the "Jesus of Gwangyang" after gaining Jeonnam fans' trust, and was appointed the club's first foreign captain in the 2025 season.

== Personal life ==
Valdívia's older brothers, Adriano and Andrezinho are also footballers. The former is a right back, while the latter is a forward.

== Career statistics ==
As of 13 March 2024

Club	Season	League			State league		Cup		Continental		Other		Total	
Club	Season	Division	Apps	Goals	Apps	Goals	Apps	Goals	Apps	Goals	Apps	Goals	Apps	Goals
Internacional	2013	Série A	2	0	—		—		—		—		2	0
Internacional	2014	Série A	27	2	5	0	2	1	2 (Note: Appearance(s) in Copa Sudamericana)	0	—		36	3
Internacional	2015	Série A	26	6	15	6	4	2	8 (Note: Appearance(s) in Copa Libertadores)	5	—		53	19
Internacional	2016	Série A	27	4	—		5	0	—		—		32	4
Internacional	2017	Série B	0	0	14	1	6	1	—		1	0	21	2
Internacional	Total		82	12	34	7	17	4	10	5	1	0	144	28
Atlético Mineiro (loan)	2017	Série A	26	2	—		—		2	0	3	0	31	2
Atlético Mineiro (loan)	2018	Série A	—		2	0	—		—		—		2	0
Atlético Mineiro (loan)	Total		26	2	2	0	0	0	2	0	3	0	33	2
São Paulo (loan)	2018	Série A	5	0	8	0	4	3	2	0	—		20	3
Al-Ittihad (loan)	2018–19	Saudi Pro League	7	1	—		1	0	—		—		8	1
Vasco da Gama (loan)	2019	Série A	12	0	—		—		—		—		12	0
Avaí (loan)	2020	Série B	33	6	11	1	1	0	—		—		45	7
Avaí	2021	Série B	34	2	12	0	4	0	—		—		50	2
Cuiabá	2022	Série A	27	2	—		4	0	4	0	—		31	2
Jeonnam Dragons	2023	K League 2	36	14	—		1	0	—		—		37	14
Jeonnam Dragons	2024	K League 2	33	12	—		—		—		—		33	12
Jeonnam Dragons	Total		38	14	—		1	0	—		—		70	26
Career total			264	39	67	8	32	7	18	5	4	0	418	71

== Honours ==
Internacional

- Campeonato Gaúcho: 2014, 2015
- Recopa Gaúcha: 2016, 2017

Avaí

- Campeonato Catarinense: 2021

Cuiabá

- Campeonato Mato-Grossense: 2022

Individual

- Campeonato Gaúcho Best Player: 2015
- Campeonato Gaúcho Team of the Year: 2015
- Campeonato Catarinense Team of the Year: 2021
- K League 2 Most Valuable Player: 2023
- K League 2 top assist provider: 2023
- K League 2 Best XI: 2023, 2024, 2025
