= Antonio Arias (referee) =

Paraguayan football referee

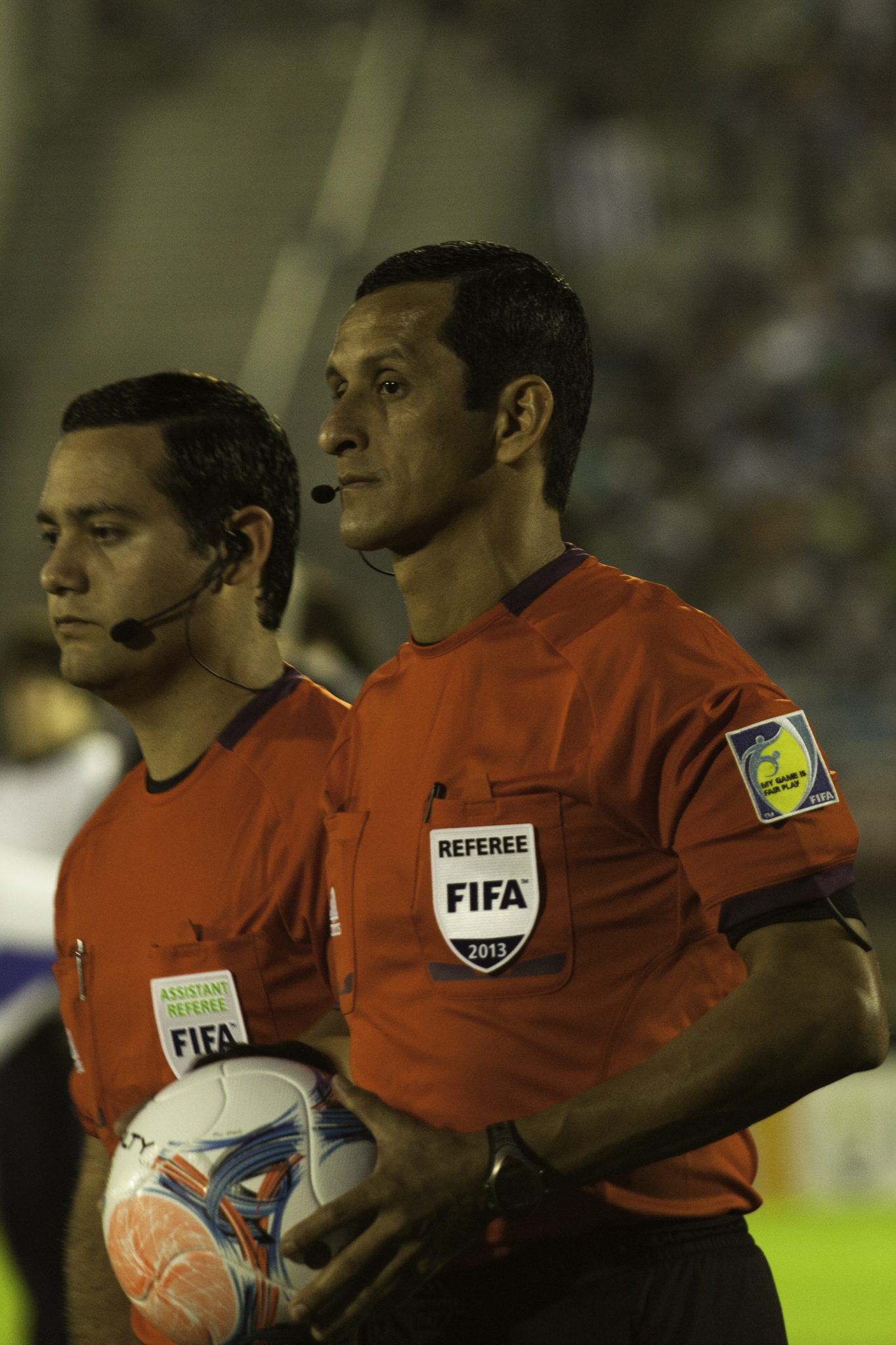
- Full name: Antonio Javier Arias Alvarenga
- Born: 7 September 1972 (age 54)

Domestic
| Years | League | Role |

International
| Years | League | Role |
| 2005– | FIFA listed | Referee |

Antonio Javier Arias Alvarenga (Note: In this Spanish name, the first or paternal surname is Arias and the second or maternal family name is Alvarenga.) (born 7 September 1972) is a Paraguayan football referee. He refereed at the 2014 FIFA World Cup qualifiers and first leg of the 2015 Copa Libertadores Finals.

A native of the Chaco region, Arias was praised for his performances at the 2011 South American U-20 Championship.
