= 2026 K League 2 =

Hana Bank K League 2
- Season: 2026
- Dates: 28 February – 29 November 2026
- Champions: Suwon Samsung Bluewings (1st title)
- Promoted: Suwon Samsung Bluewings; Suwon FC
- Matches: 264
- Goals: 724 (2.74 per match)
- Top goalscorer: (Colombia) Luis Mina (Gimpo FC, Suwon Samsung Bluewings) (17 goals)
- Biggest home win: Busan IPark 4–1 Paju Frontier (30 May)
- Biggest away win: Chungbuk Cheongju 1–5 Daegu (4 July)
- Highest scoring: Daegu 4–2 Jeonnam Dragons (7 March); Jeonnam Dragons 3–3 Busan IPark (5 July); Jeonnam Dragons 2–4 Daegu (24 October); Gimhae 3–3 Cheonan City (1 November)
- Longest winning run: 7 Suwon Samsung Bluewings
- Longest unbeaten run: 15; Suwon FC
- Longest winless run: 13; Jeonnam Dragons, Chungbuk Cheongju
- Longest losing run: 4 Gimhae
- Highest attendance: 24,071; Suwon Samsung Bluewings 2-1 Seoul E-Land (28 February)
- Lowest attendance: 684; Gimhae 0-3 Yongin (30 August)
- Total attendance: 1,194,185
- Average attendance: 4,523
- All statistics correct as of 22 November 2026.

The 2026 K League 2, also known as the Hana Bank K League 2 for sponsorship reasons, is the 14th season of the K League 2, the second-highest division in South Korean football league system.

== Overview ==
The league has expand to 17 teams for this season. Two teams relegated from K League 1, and the twelve teams remaining in the league, two teams promoted from the K3 League and one newly established club.

K League 2 will be reduced or expanded to 15 or 16 teams starting next season, due to the expansion of K League 1 from 12 to 14 teams, no team will be automatically relegated from the top tier.

This season, Promotion and Relegation between K League 2 and K3 League have been introduce for 2026 onwards. First and second place are promoted automatically, while third and sixth place face a promotion play-off, the winner of the promotion play-off final will automatically be promoted, the loser of the promotion play-off final will face-off against the 12th place team of K League 1 (only if Gimcheon Sangmu does not finish last).

Last place in K League 2 will face -off against the Champions of K3 League in the inaugural Relegation play-off round.

== Teams ==
=== Team Changes ===
As the 2025 K League 2 champions, Incheon United and the play-off winners Bucheon FC 1995 have been promoted to the K League 1. Both teams ended in the second tier after one and twelve years, respectively.

Meanwhile, Suwon FC and Daegu FC have been relegated from the K League 1. Daegu FC and Suwon FC return to second tier after nine and five years absence, respectively.

Additionally, Gimhae FC 2008 and Paju Frontier have been accepted into the K League 2 following a decision by the K League Federation, having participated in the K3 League since 2020 and 2021. In August 2025, Yongin FC received approval to join the K League, confirming its intention to participate in the 2026 K League 2. On 16 January 2026, two teams from K3 League and one newly established team will participate in K League 2 for the 2026 season after its final approval for membership in the K League Federation.

Incoming Teams
Relegated from K League 1
- Suwon FC
- Daegu FC
Accepted from K3 League
- Gimhae FC 2008
- Paju Frontier
New Club
- Yongin FC

Outgoing Teams
Promoted to K League 1
- Incheon United
- Bucheon FC 1995

=== Locations ===
The following seventeen teams are participating in the 2026 K League 2.

| Team | City/Province | Abbreviation |
|---|---|---|
| Ansan Greeners | Ansan | Ansan |
| Busan IPark | Busan | Busan |
| Cheonan City | Cheonan | Cheonan |
| Chungbuk Cheongju | Cheongju | Chungbuk Cheongju |
| Chungnam Asan | Asan | Chungnam Asan |
| Daegu FC | Daegu | Daegu |
| Gimpo FC | Gimpo | Gimpo |
| Gimhae FC 2008 | Gimhae | Gimhae |
| Gyeongnam FC | Gyeongnam | Gyeongnam |
| Hwaseong FC | Hwaseong | Hwaseong |
| Jeonnam Dragons | Jeonnam | Jeonnam |
| Paju Frontier | Paju | Paju |
| Seongnam FC | Seongnam | Seongnam |
| Seoul E-Land | Seoul | Seoul E |
| Suwon Samsung Bluewings | Suwon | Suwon |
| Suwon FC | Suwon | Suwon FC |
| Yongin FC | Yongin | Yongin |

| Locations of the 2026 K League 2 teams | Locations of the 2026 K League 2 teams in the Seoul Capital Area |

=== Stadiums ===
| Ansan Greeners | Busan IPark | Cheonan City | Chungbuk Cheongju | Chungnam Asan |
|---|---|---|---|---|
| Ansan Wa~ Stadium | Busan Gudeok Stadium | Cheonan Stadium | Cheongju Stadium | Yi Sun-sin Stadium |
| Capacity: 35,000 | Capacity: 12,349 | Capacity: 26,000 | Capacity: 16,280 | Capacity: 19,283 |
| Daegu FC | Gimhae FC 2008 | Gimpo FC | Gyeongnam FC | Hwaseong FC |
| Daegu iM Bank Park | Gimhae Sports Complex | Gimpo Solteo Football Stadium | Changwon Football Center | Hwaseong Stadium |
| Capacity: 12,415 | Capacity: 15,066 | Capacity: 5,000 | Capacity: 15,074 | Capacity: 35,270 |
| Jeonnam Dragons | Paju Frontier | Seongnam FC | Seoul E-Land | Suwon FC |
| Gwangyang Stadium | Paju Stadium | Tancheon Stadium | Mokdong Stadium | Suwon Sports Complex |
| Capacity: 13,496 | Capacity: 23,000 | Capacity: 16,146 | Capacity: 15,511 | Capacity: 11,808 |
| Suwon Samsung Bluewings | Yongin FC | | | |
| Suwon World Cup Stadium | Yongin Mireu Stadium | | | |
| Capacity: 44,031 | Capacity: 37,155 | | | |

=== Personnel and sponsoring ===
| Team | Manager | Main sponsor | Kit manufacturer |
|---|---|---|---|
| Ansan Greeners | (South Korea) Choi Moon-sik | Ansan City Greeners | Hummel |
| Busan IPark | (South Korea) Jo Sung-hwan | HDC | Puma |
| Cheonan City | (South Korea) Park Jin-sub | Cheonan City | Sunderland of Scotland |
| Chungbuk Cheongju | (Portugal) Rui Quinta | Hanyang Leeps | Sports Tribe |
| Chungnam Asan | (Brazil) André | Chungnam Asan | FCMM |
| Daegu FC | (South Korea) Choi Sung-yong | IM Bank | Mizuno |
| Gimhae FC 2008 | (South Korea) Seol Ki-hyeon | Gimhae City | Sports Tribe |
| Gimpo FC | (South Korea) Ko Jeong-woon | Goobne | Sunderland of Scotland |
| Gyeongnam FC | (South Korea) Bae Sung-jae | Nonghyup Bank | Hummel |
| Hwaseong FC | (South Korea) Cha Du-ri | Hwaseong Special City | Kelme |
| Jeonnam Dragons | (South Korea) Lim Kwan-sik | POSCO | Reebok |
| Paju Frontier | (Spain) Gerard Nus | Lucell | Kelme |
| Seongnam FC | (South Korea) Kim Hae-woon | Seongnam City | Umbro |
| Seoul E-Land | (South Korea) Kim Do-kyun | E-Land | New Balance |
| Suwon FC | (South Korea) Park Kun-ha | Suwon Special City | Hummel |
| Suwon Samsung Bluewings | (South Korea) Lee Jung-hyo | Samsung Galaxy S26 | Umbro |
| Yongin FC | (South Korea) Choi Yun-kyum | Yongin Special City | Puma |

=== Managerial changes ===
| Team | Outgoing manager | Manner of departure | Date of vacancy | Replaced by | Date of appointment |
|---|---|---|---|---|---|
| Ansan Greeners | (South Korea) Hong Seong-yo (Interim) | End of Interim | 17 November 2025 | (South Korea) Choi Moon-sik | 17 November 2025 |
| Cheonan City | (South Korea) Cho Sung-yong (Interim) | End of Interim | 1 December 2025 | (South Korea) Park Jin-sub | 1 December 2025 |
| Gyeongnam FC | (South Korea) Kim Pil-jong (Interim) | End of Interim | 8 December 2025 | (South Korea) Bae Sung-jae | 8 December 2025 |
| Jeonnam Dragons | (South Korea) Kim Hyun-seok | End of Contract | 4 December 2025 | (South Korea) Park Dong-hyuk | 16 December 2025 |
| Chungnam Asan | (South Korea) Cho Jin-soo (Interim) | End of Interim | 17 December 2025 | (South Korea) Lim Kwan-sik | 17 December 2025 |
| Suwon Samsung Bluewings | (South Korea) Byun Sung-hwan | Resigned | 7 December 2025 | (South Korea) Lee Jung-hyo | 24 December 2025 |
| Suwon FC | (South Korea) Kim Eun-jung | Mutual consent | 24 December 2025 | (South Korea) Park Kun-ha | 24 December 2025 |
| Chungbuk Cheongju | (South Korea) Kim Gil-sik | End of Contract | 12 December 2025 | (Portugal) Rui Quinta | 30 December 2025 |
| Yongin FC | Inaugural season | | | (South Korea) Choi Yun-kyum | 4 January 2026 |
| Chungnam Asan | (South Korea) Lim Kwan-sik | Resigned | 15 April 2026 | (South Korea) Kim Hyo-il (Interim) | 15 April 2026 |
| Daegu FC | (South Korea) Kim Byung-soo | Resigned | 20 April 2026 | (South Korea) Choi Sung-yong | 20 April 2026 |
| Jeonnam Dragons | (South Korea) Park Dong-hyuk | Change of Position | 27 April 2026 | (South Korea) Lim Kwan-sik | 30 April 2026 |
| Chungnam Asan | (South Korea) Kim Hyo-il (Interim) | End of Interim | 29 April 2026 | (Brazil) André | 29 April 2026 |
| Seongnam FC | (South Korea) Jeon Kyung-jun | End of Contract | 4 August 2026 | (South Korea) Han Dong-hoon (Interim) | 4 August 2026 |
| Seongnam FC | (South Korea) Han Dong-hoon (Interim) | End of Interim | 11 August 2026 | (South Korea) Kim Hae-woon | 11 August 2026 |
| Gimhae FC 2008 | (South Korea) Son Hyun-jun | Resigned | 1 October 2026 | (South Korea) Choi Myung-sung (Interim) | 1 October 2026 |
| Gimhae FC 2008 | (South Korea) Choi Myung-sung (Interim) | End of Interim | 28 October 2026 | (South Korea) Seol Ki-hyeon | 28 October 2026 |

== Foreign players ==
| Club | Player 1 | Player 2 | Player 3 | Player 4 | Player 5 | Player 6 | Former players |
|---|---|---|---|---|---|---|---|
| Ansan Greeners | (Brazil) Gabriel Lima | (Brazil) Marlon | (Serbia) Milan Obradović | (South Sudan) Machop Chol | (Sweden) Tim Hartzell | | |
| Busan IPark | (Brazil) Antonio Gutemberg | (Brazil) Cristian Renato | (Brazil) Gabriel Honório | (Brazil) Xavier | (Uzbekistan) Otabek Ahadov | | |
| Cheonan City | (Brazil) Bruno Lamas | (Brazil) Gustavo Sarjani | (Brazil) Willyan | (Guinea-Bissau) Ivanildo | (Mali) Aboubacar Toungara | | |
| Chungbuk Cheongju | (Colombia) Ménder García | (Portugal) Francisco Geraldes | (Portugal) Rafael Bandeira | | | | (Bolivia) Enzo Monteiro (England) Finley Welch (Georgia (country)) Irakli Bugridze |
| Chungnam Asan | (Australia) Charles Lokolingoy | (Brazil) Denisson Silva | (Brazil) Vitinho | (Croatia) Maks Čelić | (Ghana) Naeem Mohammed | | (Brazil) Dudu Nardini (Brazil) Wiliam Marcílio |
| Daegu FC | (Brazil) Cesinha | (Brazil) Danrlei | (Brazil) Edgar | (Brazil) Matheus Serafim | (Wales) Marcus Dackers | | (Brazil) Geovani (Brazil) Jatobá |
| Gimhae FC 2008 | (Brazil) Miguel Baggio | (Georgia (country)) Beka Mikeltadze | (Portugal) Rúben Macedo | (Senegal) Maissa Fall | | | (Portugal) Bruno Costa |
| Gimpo FC | (Australia) Connor Chapman | (Brazil) Djalma | (Brazil) Luan Dias | (Brazil) Paulo Henrique | (Iraq) Amar Muhsin | | (Colombia) Luis Mina |
| Gyeongnam FC | (Brazil) Felipe Fonseca | (Brazil) Lucão | (Montenegro) Aleksa Karadzić | (Nigeria) Chigozie Mbah | | | (Brazil) Danrlei (Brazil) Marcus Uberaba (Portugal) Rúben Macedo |
| Hwaseong FC | (Bosnia and Herzegovina) Aleksandar Vojnović | (Brazil) Demethryus | (Kosovo) Leonard Pllana | (Russia) Stanislav Iljutcenko | (Serbia) Sava Petrov | | |
| Jeonnam Dragons | (Brazil) Mirandinha | (Brazil) Ronan | (Brazil) Valdívia | (Georgia (country)) Irakli Bugridze | | | (Martinique) Jérémy Corinus (Collectivity of Saint Martin) Keelan Lebon |
| Paju Frontier | (Brazil) Walterson | (Colombia) Julián Bonilla | (Curaçao) Jafar Arias | (England) Luke Amos | (Paraguay) Julio Báez | (Spain) Borja Bastón | (Thailand) Siam Yapp |
| Seongnam FC | (Brazil) Elionay Freitas | (Brazil) Rodrigo Angelotti | (Brazil) Venício | (Colombia) Paul Villero | (Japan) Ryoji Fujimori | (Japan) Shun Kudo | |
| Seoul E-Land | (Brazil) Alan Cariús | (Brazil) Caio Marcelo | (Brazil) Euller | (Brazil) Gabriel Santos | (Spain) Osmar | | (Australia) John Iredale (Portugal) Francisco Geraldes |
| Suwon FC | (Brazil) Derlan | (Brazil) Matheus Babi | (Brazil) Matheus Frizzo | (Japan) Koki Tsukagawa | | | (Brazil) Willyan (Norway) Martin Hoel Andersen |
| Suwon Samsung Bluewings | (Brazil) Bruno Silva | (Brazil) Fessin | (Brazil) Reis | (Colombia) Luis Mina | (Lithuania) Edgaras Dubickas | (Collectivity of Saint Martin) Keelan Lebon | (Brazil) Paulo Henrique (Russia) Stanislav Iljutcenko |
| Yongin FC | (Brazil) Gabriel Tigrão | (Brazil) Vitinho | (Guinea-Bissau) Jardel | (Portugal) Emanuel Novo | | | (Portugal) Valter Zacarias |

== League table ==
| Pos | Team | Pld | W | D | L | GF | GA | GD | Pts | Promotion or qualification |
|---|---|---|---|---|---|---|---|---|---|---|
| 1 | Suwon Samsung Bluewings (C, P) | 31 | 21 | 6 | 4 | 55 | 26 | +29 | 69 | Promotion to K League 1 |
| 2 | Suwon FC (P) | 31 | 18 | 9 | 4 | 58 | 31 | +27 | 63 | Promotion to K League 1 |
| 3 | Daegu FC (Q) | 31 | 17 | 8 | 6 | 61 | 40 | +21 | 59 | Qualification for the promotion play-offs |
| 4 | Seoul E-Land (Q) | 31 | 17 | 7 | 7 | 58 | 39 | +19 | 58 | Qualification for the promotion play-offs |
| 5 | Busan IPark (Q) | 31 | 14 | 7 | 10 | 47 | 38 | +9 | 49 | Qualification for the promotion play-offs |
| 6 | Hwaseong FC (Q) | 31 | 13 | 9 | 9 | 45 | 33 | +12 | 48 | Qualification for the promotion play-offs |
| 7 | Chungnam Asan | 31 | 11 | 11 | 9 | 43 | 35 | +8 | 44 | |
| 8 | Gimpo FC | 31 | 9 | 12 | 10 | 39 | 42 | −3 | 39 | |
| 9 | Gyeongnam FC | 31 | 9 | 11 | 11 | 34 | 40 | −6 | 38 | |
| 10 | Cheonan City | 31 | 8 | 12 | 11 | 40 | 42 | −2 | 36 | |
| 11 | Seongnam FC | 31 | 8 | 11 | 12 | 37 | 40 | −3 | 35 | |
| 12 | Paju Frontier | 31 | 9 | 8 | 14 | 31 | 38 | −7 | 35 | |
| 13 | Yongin FC | 31 | 7 | 12 | 12 | 38 | 50 | −12 | 33 | |
| 14 | Chungbuk Cheongju | 31 | 6 | 15 | 10 | 36 | 49 | −13 | 33 | |
| 15 | Ansan Greeners | 32 | 8 | 5 | 19 | 37 | 60 | −23 | 29 | |
| 16 | Jeonnam Dragons | 31 | 5 | 10 | 16 | 38 | 57 | −19 | 25 | |
| 17 | Gimhae FC 2008 | 31 | 3 | 9 | 19 | 27 | 64 | −37 | 18 | |

Updated to match(es) played on 22 November 2026. Source: K League Soccerway
Rules for classification: 1) Points; 2) Goals scored; 3) Goal difference; 4) Wins; 5) Head-to-head points
(C) Champions; (P) Promoted; (Q) Qualified for the phase indicated

== Positions by matchday ==
Leaders, promotion to K League 1
Promotion to K League 1
Qualification for promotion play-offs semi-final

| Team ╲ Round | 1 | 2 | 3 | 4 | 5 | 6 | 7 | 8 | 9 | 10 | 11 | 12 | 13 | 14 | 15 | 16 | 17 | 18 | 19 | 20 | 21 | 22 | 23 | 24 | 25 | 26 | 27 | 28 | 29 | 30 | 31 | 32 | 33 | 34 |
|---|---|---|---|---|---|---|---|---|---|---|---|---|---|---|---|---|---|---|---|---|---|---|---|---|---|---|---|---|---|---|---|---|---|---|
| Suwon Samsung Bluewings | 5 | 3 | 3 | 1 | 1 | 2 | 2 | 2 | 2 | 2 | 2 | 2 | 2 | 3 | 2 | 2 | 2 | 2 | 2 | 1 | 1 | 1 | 1 | 1 | 1 | 1 | 1 | 1 | 1 | 1 | 1 | 1 | 1 | 1 |
| Suwon FC | 1 | 1 | 1 | 3 | 3 | 3 | 4 | 4 | 4 | 4 | 4 | 3 | 6 | 7 | 7 | 5 | 4 | 4 | 3 | 5 | 3 | 4 | 3 | 2 | 3 | 3 | 2 | 2 | 2 | 2 | 2 | 2 | 2 | 2 |
| Daegu FC | 6 | 2 | 2 | 4 | 4 | 4 | 5 | 7 | 9 | 6 | 6 | 6 | 5 | 6 | 4 | 4 | 3 | 3 | 5 | 6 | 5 | 3 | 4 | 3 | 4 | 2 | 4 | 4 | 4 | 4 | 4 | 4 | 3 | |
| Seoul E-Land | 12 | 9 | 10 | 10 | 5 | 5 | 3 | 3 | 3 | 3 | 3 | 4 | 3 | 2 | 3 | 3 | 5 | 5 | 4 | 3 | 2 | 2 | 2 | 4 | 2 | 4 | 3 | 3 | 3 | 3 | 3 | 3 | 4 | |
| Busan IPark | 9 | 4 | 4 | 2 | 2 | 1 | 1 | 1 | 1 | 1 | 1 | 1 | 1 | 1 | 1 | 1 | 1 | 1 | 1 | 2 | 4 | 5 | 5 | 6 | 6 | 6 | 6 | 6 | 5 | 5 | 5 | 5 | 5 | |
| Hwaseong FC | 17 | 8 | 6 | 8 | 13 | 13 | 11 | 11 | 8 | 5 | 5 | 5 | 4 | 4 | 5 | 6 | 6 | 6 | 6 | 4 | 6 | 6 | 6 | 5 | 5 | 5 | 5 | 5 | 6 | 6 | 6 | 6 | 6 | |
| Chungnam Asan | 4 | 7 | 9 | 12 | 7 | 6 | 7 | 8 | 7 | 11 | 7 | 8 | 8 | 8 | 8 | 8 | 7 | 8 | 8 | 7 | 8 | 8 | 7 | 7 | 7 | 9 | 8 | 7 | 8 | 7 | 7 | 7 | 7 | 7 |
| Gimpo FC | 16 | 10 | 5 | 6 | 6 | 9 | 6 | 6 | 5 | 9 | 8 | 7 | 7 | 5 | 6 | 7 | 8 | 7 | 7 | 8 | 7 | 7 | 8 | 8 | 8 | 8 | 7 | 8 | 7 | 8 | 8 | 8 | 8 | |
| Gyeongnam FC | 13 | 16 | 16 | 11 | 12 | 12 | 14 | 15 | 13 | 14 | 13 | 12 | 9 | 11 | 11 | 10 | 9 | 9 | 9 | 9 | 9 | 9 | 9 | 9 | 9 | 7 | 9 | 9 | 9 | 9 | 9 | 9 | 9 | |
| Cheonan City | 7 | 14 | 13 | 15 | 10 | 10 | 12 | 9 | 11 | 7 | 10 | 10 | 10 | 9 | 9 | 9 | 10 | 11 | 11 | 11 | 13 | 14 | 14 | 14 | 14 | 14 | 14 | 14 | 14 | 14 | 14 | 11 | 10 | |
| Seongnam FC | 9 | 11 | 14 | 7 | 9 | 8 | 9 | 10 | 12 | 10 | 9 | 9 | 10 | 10 | 10 | 11 | 13 | 10 | 10 | 12 | 10 | 11 | 10 | 10 | 10 | 10 | 10 | 11 | 11 | 11 | 13 | 14 | 11 | |
| Paju Frontier | 11 | 15 | 10 | 5 | 8 | 6 | 8 | 5 | 6 | 8 | 11 | 11 | 12 | 12 | 12 | 13 | 12 | 12 | 14 | 10 | 12 | 10 | 11 | 12 | 12 | 13 | 12 | 12 | 12 | 12 | 10 | 10 | 12 | |
| Yongin FC | 7 | 12 | 15 | 16 | 16 | 16 | 16 | 16 | 15 | 15 | 14 | 14 | 13 | 13 | 13 | 12 | 11 | 13 | 12 | 13 | 11 | 12 | 13 | 11 | 11 | 11 | 13 | 13 | 13 | 13 | 11 | 12 | 13 | |
| Chungbuk Cheongju | 13 | 13 | 12 | 13 | 14 | 15 | 13 | 13 | 14 | 13 | 15 | 15 | 15 | 15 | 14 | 14 | 14 | 14 | 13 | 14 | 14 | 13 | 12 | 13 | 13 | 12 | 11 | 10 | 10 | 10 | 12 | 13 | 14 | |
| Ansan Greeners | 1 | 6 | 7 | 9 | 11 | 11 | 10 | 12 | 10 | 12 | 12 | 13 | 14 | 14 | 15 | 15 | 15 | 15 | 15 | 15 | 15 | 15 | 15 | 16 | 15 | 15 | 15 | 16 | 15 | 15 | 16 | 15 | 15 | 15 |
| Jeonnam Dragons | 1 | 5 | 8 | 13 | 15 | 14 | 15 | 14 | 16 | 16 | 16 | 16 | 16 | 16 | 16 | 16 | 16 | 16 | 16 | 16 | 16 | 16 | 16 | 15 | 16 | 16 | 16 | 15 | 16 | 16 | 15 | 16 | 16 | 16 |
| Gimhae FC 2008 | 13 | 17 | 17 | 17 | 17 | 17 | 17 | 17 | 17 | 17 | 17 | 17 | 17 | 17 | 17 | 17 | 17 | 17 | 17 | 17 | 17 | 17 | 17 | 17 | 17 | 17 | 17 | 17 | 17 | 17 | 17 | 17 | 17 | 17 |

Updated to match(es) played on 22 November 2026. Source: K League

== Results ==
Teams played each other twice, once at home, once away.

| Home \ Away | ASG | BSI | CNC | CBCJ | CNAS | DAU | GMH | GPO | GNM | HWA | JND | PJF | SNM | SUE | SWN | SSB | YON |
|---|---|---|---|---|---|---|---|---|---|---|---|---|---|---|---|---|---|
| Ansan Greeners | — | 1–3 | 1–3 | 2–3 | 1–3 | 1–2 | 2–2 | 0–1 | 1–1 | 0–2 | 2–1 | 1–2 | 1–2 | 0–2 | 1–3 | 2–1 | 1–2 |
| Busan IPark | 0–1 | — | 1–0 | 0–0 | 2–2 | 3–1 | 2–0 | 2–0 | 3–1 | 0–0 | 2–1 | 4–1 | 1–1 | 1–2 | 2–1 | 1–4 | 2–0 |
| Cheonan City | 3–1 | 1–0 | — | 2–2 | 1–0 | 29 Nov | 0–1 | 0–1 | 1–0 | 1–1 | 1–0 | 0–0 | 1–1 | 0–0 | 2–2 | 0–1 | 2–2 |
| Chungbuk Cheongju | 1–1 | 1–2 | 1–0 | — | 0–0 | 1–5 | 1–1 | 1–1 | 1–1 | 2–3 | 2–1 | 1–2 | 3–1 | 0–2 | 1–4 | 2–2 | 0–2 |
| Chungnam Asan | 1–1 | 29 Nov | 3–1 | 0–1 | — | 2–3 | 1–1 | 5–1 | 1–1 | 1–0 | 2–2 | 3–2 | 2–0 | 3–0 | 1–3 | 2–1 | 2–1 |
| Daegu FC | 3–0 | 1–1 | 1–2 | 3–1 | 2–0 | — | 3–0 | 3–3 | 2–0 | 1–0 | 4–2 | 1–0 | 3–2 | 1–3 | 1–2 | 2–2 | 3–1 |
| Gimhae FC 2008 | 1–4 | 0–1 | 3–3 | 1–1 | 1–1 | 1–4 | — | 1–2 | 1–1 | 0–1 | 2–2 | 0–2 | 28 Nov | 1–3 | 1–2 | 0–3 | 0–3 |
| Gimpo FC | 2–2 | 1–0 | 1–1 | 3–0 | 0–2 | 1–1 | 1–2 | — | 1–1 | 29 Nov | 2–2 | 4–1 | 1–2 | 0–1 | 0–1 | 1–4 | 1–1 |
| Gyeongnam FC | 5–0 | 1–2 | 2–1 | 2–2 | 0–0 | 0–1 | 2–1 | 1–0 | — | 1–0 | 1–4 | 1–0 | 1–0 | 29 Nov | 3–2 | 0–1 | 2–2 |
| Hwaseong FC | 2–0 | 3–2 | 2–2 | 2–1 | 3–2 | 5–1 | 2–0 | 2–2 | 2–0 | — | 1–0 | 1–2 | 1–3 | 0–0 | 1–1 | 1–2 | 0–0 |
| Jeonnam Dragons | 1–2 | 3–3 | 1–0 | 2–2 | 1–0 | 2–4 | 0–1 | 2–2 | 1–1 | 1–0 | — | 1–2 | 2–2 | 0–1 | 0–3 | 29 Nov | 2–1 |
| Paju Frontier | 0–1 | 1–1 | 1–2 | 0–0 | 1–1 | 0–0 | 3–1 | 0–1 | 2–3 | 1–1 | 2–0 | — | 2–1 | 1–3 | 0–1 | 0–1 | 0–1 |
| Seongnam FC | 0–1 | 1–0 | 3–2 | 2–2 | 2–1 | 0–1 | 1–1 | 0–0 | 1–1 | 2–2 | 0–0 | 0–1 | — | 1–1 | 1–2 | 0–2 | 5–0 |
| Seoul E-Land | 3–1 | 2–3 | 4–3 | 1–2 | 1–1 | 2–1 | 6–2 | 2–1 | 1–0 | 1–2 | 3–2 | 1–1 | 3–1 | — | 3–0 | 0–1 | 2–2 |
| Suwon FC | 1–0 | 2–1 | 1–1 | 29 Nov | 0–1 | 2–2 | 2–0 | 1–1 | 3–0 | 1–0 | 5–0 | 2–1 | 0–0 | 2–2 | — | 3–1 | 3–1 |
| Suwon Samsung Bluewings | 4–1 | 3–2 | 3–2 | 0–0 | 2–0 | 0–0 | 1–0 | 0–1 | 3–1 | 3–2 | 2–0 | 0–0 | 1–0 | 2–1 | 2–2 | — | 2–0 |
| Yongin FC | 0–4 | 2–0 | 2–2 | 1–1 | 0–0 | 1–1 | 4–1 | 1–3 | 0–0 | 0–3 | 2–2 | 28 Nov | 1–2 | 4–2 | 1–1 | 0–1 | — |

Updated to match(es) played on 22 November 2026. Source: Soccerway
Legend: Blue = home team win; Yellow = draw; Red = away team win.

== Promotion play-off ==
=== Bracket ===
Semi-finals
3
6
4
5

Final

=== Semi-finals ===
| v |

Daegu or Seoul

| v |

Daegu or Seoul

=== Final ===
| v |

== Promotion/Relegation play-off ==
As Gimcheon Sangmu won't finish last, the twelfth-placed team will play against the loser of the final of the promotion play-offs of the K League 2 in the relegation play-offs.

| Team 1 | Agg. | Team 2 | 1st leg | 2nd leg |
|---|---|---|---|---|
| Loser of the final of the promotion play-offs of K League 2 | agg. | Gwangju FC | 1st leg | 2nd leg |

10 December 2026
19:00 UTC+9

| v | Gwangju FC |

13 December 2026
14:00 UTC+9

| Gwangju FC | v |

Gwangju World Cup Stadium, Gwangju

== Statistics ==
=== Top goalscorers ===
| Rank | Player | Team | Goals |
|---|---|---|---|
| 1 | (Colombia) Luis Mina | Gimpo FC; Suwon Samsung Bluewings | 17 |
| 2 | (Brazil) Euller | Seoul E-Land | 14 |
| 2 | (Colombia) Ménder García | Chungbuk Cheongju | 14 |
| 4 | (Brazil) Matheus Frizzo | Suwon FC | 13 |
| 5 | (South Korea) Park Jae-yong | Seoul E-Land | 12 |
| 6 | (Kosovo) Leonard Pllana | Hwaseong FC | 11 |
| 7 | (Brazil) Edgar | Daegu FC | 10 |
| 7 | (Brazil) Gabriel Tigrão | Yongin FC | 10 |
| 7 | (South Korea) Kim Hyeon-oh | Gyeongnam FC | 10 |
| 7 | (South Korea) Ha Jeong-woo | Suwon FC | 10 |
| 7 | (Brazil) Gabriel Lima | Ansan Greeners | 10 |
| 7 | (Brazil) Matheus Serafim | Daegu FC | 10 |
| 7 | (Brazil) Valdívia | Jeonnam Dragons | 10 |

=== Top assist providers ===
| Rank | Player | Team | Goals |
|---|---|---|---|
| 1 | (Brazil) Matheus Serafim | Daegu FC | 12 |
| 2 | (Portugal) Rafael Bandeira | Chungbuk Cheongju | 11 |
| 3 | (Brazil) Cesinha | Daegu FC | 10 |
| 4 | (Kosovo) Leonard Pllana | Hwaseong FC | 9 |
| 5 | (South Korea) Son Jun-ho | Chungnam Asan | 7 |
| 5 | (Brazil) Valdívia | Jeonnam Dragons | 7 |
| 7 | (South Korea) Kim Min-woo | Suwon Samsung Bluewings | 6 |
| 7 | (Brazil) Matheus Frizzo | Suwon FC | 6 |
| 7 | (South Korea) Lee Si-young | Suwon FC | 6 |
| 7 | (Brazil) Euller | Seoul E-Land | 6 |
| 7 | (South Korea) Park Jae-yong | Seoul E-Land | 6 |
| 7 | (South Korea) Kim Bo-sub | Yongin FC | 6 |

== Awards ==
=== Weekly awards ===
| Round | Player of the Round | |
| Round | Player | Club |
|---|---|---|
| 1 | (Brazil) Matheus Frizzo | Suwon FC |
| 2 | (Brazil) Edgar | Daegu FC |
| 3 | (Brazil) Gabriel Honório | Busan IPark |
| 4 | (Brazil) Cristian Renato | Busan IPark |
| 5 | (South Korea) Kang Hyeon-je | Seoul E-Land |
| 6 | (South Korea) Kim Jong-min | Chungnam Asan |
| 7 | (South Korea) Baek Ga-on | Busan IPark |
| 8 | (Brazil) Xavier | Busan IPark |
| 9 | (South Korea) Kim Min-woo | Yongin FC |
| 10 | (South Korea) Ha Jeong-woo | Suwon FC |
| 11 | (South Korea) Kim Jong-min | Chungnam Asan |
| 12 | (South Korea) Ha Nam | Jeonnam Dragons |
| 13 | (Serbia) Sava Petrov | Hwaseong FC |
| 14 | (Brazil) Gabriel Honório | Busan IPark |
| 15 | (Colombia) Ménder García | Chungbuk Cheongju |
| 16 | (South Korea) Kim Ju-gong | Daegu FC |
| 17 | (Brazil) Matheus Frizzo | Suwon FC |

| Round | Player of the Round | |
| Round | Player | Club |
|---|---|---|
| 18 | (South Korea) Kim Hyeon-oh | Gyeongnam FC |
| 19 | (Brazil) Alan Cariús | Seoul E-Land |
| 20 | (Kosovo) Leonard Pllana | Hwaseong FC |
| 21 | (Brazil) Luan Dias | Gimpo FC |
| 22 | (Brazil) Euller | Seoul E-Land |
| 23 | (Colombia) Paul Villero | Seongnam FC |
| 24 | (Brazil) Cesinha | Daegu FC |
| 25 | (South Korea) An Joo-wan | Seoul E-Land |
| 26 | (Brazil) Matheus Serafim | Daegu FC |
| 27 | (South Korea) Park Jae-yong | Seoul E-Land |
| 28 | (Colombia) Luis Mina | Suwon Samsung Bluewings |
| 29 | (Brazil) Gabriel Lima | Ansan Greeners |
| 30 | (Brazil) Gabriel Honório | Busan IPark |
| 31 | (Brazil) Gabriel Tigrão | Yongin FC |
| 32 | (Brazil) Euller | Seoul E-Land |
| 33 | | |
| 34 | | |

=== Annual awards ===
| Award | Winner | Club |
|---|---|---|
| Most Valuable Player | | |
| Young Player of the Year | | |
| Top goalscorer | | |
| Top assist provider | | |
| Manager of the Year | | |

| Position | Best XI |
|---|---|
| Goalkeeper | |
| Defenders | |
| Midfielders | |
| Forwards | |

== See also ==
- 2026 in South Korean football
- 2026–27 Korea Cup
- 2026 K League 1
- 2026 K3 League
- 2026 K4 League
