= 2025 K League 2 =

South Korean professional league season

Hana Bank K League 2
- Season: 2025
- Dates: 22 February – 23 November
- Champions: Incheon United (1st title)
- Promoted: Incheon United; Bucheon FC 1995
- Matches: 273
- Goals: 686 (2.51 per match)
- Best player: Gerso Fernandes
- Top goalscorer: Stefan Mugoša (20 goals)
- Biggest home win: Seoul E 6–0 Ansan (23 November)
- Biggest away win: Chungbuk Cheongju 0–4 Incheon (24 August)
- Highest scoring: Seoul E 4–2 Suwon (9 March); Ansan 3–3 Hwaseong (29 March); Chungbuk Cheongju 3–3 Suwon (4 May); Seoul E 6–0 Ansan (23 November)
- Longest winning run: 6 matches Incheon United
- Longest unbeaten run: 8 matches Incheon United
- Longest winless run: 7 matches Cheonan City
- Longest losing run: 7 matches Cheonan City
- Highest attendance: 22,265; Suwon 1–2 Incheon (15 June)
- Lowest attendance: 1,021; Cheonan 0–1 Ansan (13 April)
- Total attendance: 1,177,470
- Average attendance: 4,313

The 2025 K League 2, also known as the Hana Bank K League 2 for sponsorship reasons, is the 13th season of the K League 2, the second-highest division in South Korean football league system.

== Teams ==
=== Team changes ===
As the 2024 K League 2 champions, FC Anyang was promoted to the K League 1. Incheon United was relegated from the K League 1 for the first time in the club's history. Meanwhile, Hwaseong FC, which participated in the K3 League since 2013, was accepted to the K League 2 by the judgement of K League Federation.

Incoming
▼ Relegated from K League 1
- Incheon United
▲ Accepted from K3 League
- Hwaseong FC

Outgoing
▲ Promoted to K League 1
- FC Anyang

=== Locations ===
The following fourteen teams are participating in the 2025 K League 2.

Team	City/Province	Abbreviation
Ansan Greeners	Ansan	Ansan
Bucheon FC 1995	Bucheon	Bucheon
Busan IPark	Busan	Busan
Cheonan City	Cheonan	Cheonan
Chungbuk Cheongju	Cheongju	Chungbuk Cheongju
Chungnam Asan	Asan	Chungnam Asan
Gimpo FC	Gimpo	Gimpo
Gyeongnam FC	Gyeongnam	Gyeongnam
Hwaseong FC	Hwaseong	Hwaseong
Incheon United	Incheon	Incheon
Jeonnam Dragons	Jeonnam	Jeonnam
Seongnam FC	Seongnam	Seongnam
Seoul E-Land	Seoul	Seoul E
Suwon Samsung Bluewings	Suwon	Suwon

Locations of the 2025 K League 2 teams	Locations of the 2025 K League 2 teams in the Seoul Capital Area

=== Stadiums ===
Ansan Greeners	Bucheon FC 1995	Busan IPark	Chungbuk Cheongju	Cheonan City
Ansan Wa~ Stadium	Bucheon Stadium	Busan Gudeok Stadium	Cheongju Stadium	Cheonan Stadium
Capacity: 35,000	Capacity: 34,456	Capacity: 12,349	Capacity: 16,280	Capacity: 26,000
Chungnam Asan	Gimpo FC	Gyeongnam FC	Hwaseong FC	Incheon United
Yi Sun-sin Stadium	Gimpo Solteo Football Stadium	Changwon Football Center	Hwaseong Stadium	Incheon Football Stadium
Capacity: 19,283	Capacity: 5,000	Capacity: 15,074	Capacity: 35,270	Capacity: 20,891
Jeonnam Dragons	Seongnam FC	Seoul E-Land	Suwon Samsung Bluewings	
Gwangyang Stadium	Tancheon Stadium	Mokdong Stadium	Suwon World Cup Stadium	
Capacity: 13,496	Capacity: 16,146	Capacity: 15,511	Capacity: 44,031	

=== Personnel and sponsoring ===
Team	Manager	Main sponsor	Kit manufacturer
Ansan Greeners	(South Korea) Hong Seong-yo (caretaker)	Government of Ansan	Applerind
Bucheon FC 1995	(South Korea) Lee Young-min	Government of Bucheon	Kelme
Busan IPark	(South Korea) Jo Sung-hwan	HDC Hyundai Development Company	Mizuno
Cheonan City	(South Korea) Cho Sung-yong (caretaker)	Government of Cheonan	Puma
Chungbuk Cheongju	(South Korea) Kim Gil-sik		Applerind
Chungnam Asan	(South Korea) Cho Jin-soo (caretaker)	Haeyu Construction	FCMM
Gimpo FC	(South Korea) Ko Jeong-woon	Government of Gimpo	Sunderland of Scotland
Gyeongnam FC	(South Korea) Kim Pil-jong (caretaker)	Nonghyup Bank	Hummel
Hwaseong FC	(South Korea) Cha Du-ri	Hwaseong Special City	Kelme
Incheon United	(South Korea) Yoon Jong-hwan	IFEZ	Macron
Jeonnam Dragons	(South Korea) Kim Hyun-seok	POSCO	Mizuno
Seongnam FC	(South Korea) Jeon Kyung-jun	Government of Seongnam	Umbro
Seoul E-Land	(South Korea) Kim Do-kyun	NC Department Store	New Balance
Suwon Samsung Bluewings	(South Korea) Byun Sung-hwan	Samsung Galaxy S24	Puma

=== Managerial changes ===
Team	Outgoing manager	Manner of departure	Date of vacancy	Table	Replaced by	Date of appointment
Chungbuk Cheongju	(South Korea) Choi Yun-kyum	Resigned	2 October 2024	Pre-season	(South Korea) Kwon Ou-ghu	11 December 2024
Hwaseong FC	(South Korea) Ju Seung-jin	End of contract	5 December 2024	Pre-season	(South Korea) Cha Du-ri	6 December 2024
Jeonnam Dragons	(South Korea) Lee Jang-kwan	Mutual consent	10 December 2024	Pre-season	(South Korea) Kim Hyun-seok	10 December 2024
Chungnam Asan	(South Korea) Kim Hyun-seok	Signed by Jeonnam Dragons	10 December 2024	Pre-season	(South Korea) Bae Sung-jae	12 December 2024
Incheon United	(South Korea) Choi Yung-keun	Mutual consent	21 December 2024	Pre-season	(South Korea) Yoon Jong-hwan	22 December 2024
Chungbuk Cheongju	(South Korea) Kwon Ou-ghu	Resigned	10 June 2025	13th	(South Korea) Kim Gil-sik	8 July 2025
Cheonan City	(South Korea) Kim Tae-wan	Resigned	20 August 2025	14th	(South Korea) Cho Sung-yong (caretaker)	22 August 2025
Gyeongnam FC	(South Korea) Lee Eul-yong	Resigned	6 September 2025	11th	(South Korea) Kim Pil-jong (caretaker)	7 September 2025
Ansan Greeners	(South Korea) Lee Kwan-woo	Resigned	18 September 2025	14th	(South Korea) Hong Seong-yo (caretaker)	19 September 2025
Chungnam Asan	(South Korea) Bae Sung-jae	Mutual consent	4 October 2025	9th	(South Korea) Cho Jin-soo (caretaker)	5 September 2025

=== Foreign players ===
Club	Player 1	Player 2	Player 3	Player 4	Player 5	Former players
Ansan Greeners	(Brazil) Bruno Lapa	(Brazil) Eduardo Silverio	(Brazil) Felipe Saraiva	(Brazil) Jefferson Carioca		(Brazil) Luan Santos
Bucheon FC 1995	(Brazil) Jefferson Galego	(Brazil) Rodrigo Bassani	(Brazil) Thiaguinho Santos	(Colombia) Jhon Montaño	(Japan) Kazuki Takahashi	
Busan IPark	(Brazil) Fessin	(Brazil) Gonzalo Fornari	(Brazil) Xavier	(Colombia) Paul Villero		
Cheonan City	(Brazil) Bruno Paraíba	(Japan) Misaki Sato	(Mali) Aboubacar Toungara			(Brazil) Felipe Valdívia (Serbia) Pavle Ivelja
Chungbuk Cheongju	(Brazil) Pedro Vitor	(Netherlands) Jop van der Avert				(Brazil) Gabriel Santos (Brazil) Mateusinho
Chungnam Asan	(Australia) Charles Lokolingoy	(Brazil) Denisson Silva	(Sweden) Adam Bergmark Wiberg			(Bosnia and Herzegovina) Semir Smajlagić (Japan) Misaki Sato (Uruguay) Kevin Méndez
Gimpo FC	(Australia) Connor Chapman	(Brazil) Djalma	(Colombia) Luis Mina	(Kosovo) Leonard Pllana		(Brazil) Bruno Paraíba
Gyeongnam FC	(Brazil) Danrlei	(Brazil) Leonardo Kalil	(Brazil) Renan Areias	(Portugal) Bruno Costa	(Portugal) Rúben Macedo	(Brazil) Felipe Fonseca (Brazil) Matheus Souza
Hwaseong FC	(Bosnia and Herzegovina) Aleksandar Vojnović	(Brazil) Arthur Moura	(Brazil) Demethryus	(Brazil) Dimitri	(Brazil) Luan Costa	(Brazil) Dominic Vinicius
Incheon United	(Australia) Harrison Delbridge	(The Gambia) Modou Barrow	(Guinea-Bissau) Gerso Fernandes	(Japan) Shota Saijo	(Montenegro) Stefan Mugoša	
Jeonnam Dragons	(Brazil) Ronan David	(Brazil) Valdívia	(Collectivity of Saint Martin) Keelan Lebon	(Uruguay) José Alberti		(Brazil) Leandro Ribeiro
Seongnam FC	(Brazil) Freitas	(Brazil) Leandro Ribeiro	(Brazil) Samuel Andrade	(Brazil) Venício Tomás	(Colombia) Leonardo Acevedo	
Seoul E-Land	(Australia) Aaron Calver	(Australia) John Iredale	(Brazil) Euller	(Brazil) Gabriel Santos	(Spain) Osmar	(Brazil) Alan Carius (Brazil) Ítalo (Brazil) Pedrinho
Suwon Samsung Bluewings	(Brazil) Bruno Silva	(Brazil) Léo Andrade	(Brazil) Matheus Serafim	(Brazil) Paulo Henrique	(Russia) Stanislav Iljutcenko	

== League table ==
Pos	Team	Pld	W	D	L	GF	GA	GD	Pts	Promotion or qualification
1	Incheon United (C, P)	39	23	9	7	66	30	+36	78	Promotion to K League 1
2	Suwon Samsung Bluewings	39	20	12	7	76	50	+26	72	Qualification for promotion play-offs final round
3	Bucheon FC 1995 (O, P)	39	19	10	10	59	49	+10	67	Qualification for promotion play-offs second round
4	Seoul E-Land	39	17	14	8	64	43	+21	65	Qualification for promotion play-offs first round
5	Seongnam FC	39	17	13	9	46	32	+14	64	Qualification for promotion play-offs first round
6	Jeonnam Dragons	39	17	11	11	63	52	+11	62	
7	Gimpo FC	39	14	13	12	48	37	+11	55	
8	Busan IPark	39	14	13	12	47	46	+1	55	
9	Chungnam Asan	39	13	14	12	51	47	+4	53	
10	Hwaseong FC	39	9	13	17	36	50	−14	40	
11	Gyeongnam FC	39	11	7	21	34	58	−24	40	
12	Chungbuk Cheongju	39	7	10	22	30	62	−32	31	
13	Cheonan City	39	7	9	23	41	70	−29	30	
14	Ansan Greeners	39	5	12	22	25	60	−35	27	

Source: K League Soccerway
Rules for classification: 1) Points; 2) Goals scored; 3) Goal difference; 4) Wins; 5) Head-to-head points
(C) Champions; (O) Play-off winners; (P) Promoted

== Positions by matchday ==
Leaders, promotion to K League 1
Qualification for promotion play-offs final round
Qualification for promotion play-offs second round
Qualification for promotion play-offs first round

Team ╲ Round	1	2	3	4	5	6	7	8	9	10	11	12	13	14	15	16	17	18	19	20	21	22	23	24	25	26	27	28	29	30	31	32	33	34	35	36	37	38	39
Incheon United	2	2	4	2	2	2	1	1	1	1	1	1	1	1	1	1	1	1	1	1	1	1	1	1	1	1	1	1	1	1	1	1	1	1	1	1	1	1	1
Suwon Samsung Bluewings	6	7	10	11	9	6	6	5	4	4	3	3	3	2	2	2	2	2	2	2	2	2	2	2	2	2	2	2	2	2	2	2	2	2	2	2	2	2	2
Bucheon FC 1995	1	1	5	1	3	3	5	6	7	7	6	5	5	6	6	6	6	3	3	4	3	3	4	3	4	4	3	3	3	3	3	4	4	3	3	3	3	3	3
Seoul E-Land	5	4	1	5	1	1	3	4	3	2	4	4	2	4	4	4	5	6	6	6	6	6	5	5	6	6	6	6	7	8	8	6	7	5	5	5	5	5	4
Seongnam FC	2	3	2	4	4	4	2	2	5	6	7	7	7	8	8	8	8	9	9	9	8	8	8	8	8	8	8	7	6	5	6	8	8	8	6	6	6	6	5
Jeonnam Dragons	2	3	3	3	5	5	4	3	2	3	2	2	4	3	3	3	3	4	4	3	4	4	3	4	3	3	4	4	5	6	4	3	3	4	4	4	4	4	6
Gimpo FC	7	5	7	7	7	7	7	9	11	12	8	9	10	10	10	9	9	8	8	8	7	7	7	7	7	7	7	8	8	7	7	7	5	7	8	8	8	8	7
Busan IPark	7	12	8	6	8	9	9	8	6	5	5	6	6	5	5	5	4	5	5	5	5	5	6	6	5	5	5	5	4	4	5	5	6	6	7	7	7	7	8
Chungnam Asan	9	9	13	13	12	11	10	10	8	9	10	8	8	7	7	7	7	7	7	7	9	9	9	9	9	9	9	9	9	9	9	9	9	9	9	9	9	9	9
Hwaseong FC	10	11	12	8	10	10	11	12	12	11	12	12	12	13	12	12	13	12	13	10	10	10	11	10	10	10	10	10	10	10	10	10	10	10	10	10	10	10	10
Gyeongnam FC	12	7	9	8	5	8	9	8	9	10	11	11	9	9	9	10	10	10	10	12	13	13	12	12	12	12	12	11	11	11	11	11	11	11	11	11	11	11	11
Chungbuk Cheongju	10	10	6	10	11	12	12	11	10	8	9	10	11	11	13	13	12	13	12	13	11	11	10	11	11	11	11	12	12	12	13	13	13	13	13	13	13	13	12
Cheonan City	12	13	11	12	13	13	14	14	14	14	14	14	14	14	14	14	14	14	14	14	14	14	14	14	14	13	13	13	13	13	12	12	12	12	12	12	12	12	13
Ansan Greeners	11	14	14	14	14	14	13	13	13	13	13	13	13	12	11	11	11	11	11	11	12	12	13	13	13	14	14	14	14	14	14	14	14	14	14	14	14	14	14

Updated to match(es) played on 23 November 2025. Source: K League

== Results ==
=== Matches 1–26 ===
Teams played each other twice, once at home, once away.

Home \ Away	ASG	BCN	BSI	CNC	CBCJ	CNAS	GIM	GNM	HWA	ICU	JND	SNM	SUE	SSB
Ansan Greeners	—	0–1	1–3	0–0	1–2	0–2	0–2	1–0	3–3	0–2	0–1	1–0	2–2	0–1
Bucheon FC 1995	3–1	—	0–2	0–0	3–1	5–3	1–1	2–0	1–0	1–3	2–2	2–3	3–1	1–1
Busan IPark	0–2	4–2	—	2–1	2–2	2–0	0–0	0–1	3–2	0–2	0–1	0–0	2–2	1–4
Cheonan City	0–1	1–2	0–1	—	0–1	1–0	0–2	4–0	2–3	3–3	0–2	1–1	4–2	1–2
Chungbuk Cheongju	0–0	0–1	0–2	2–1	—	0–2	0–3	1–2	1–1	0–4	2–2	0–1	2–1	3–3
Chungnam Asan	3–0	2–2	0–1	0–1	3–1	—	2–0	2–2	1–1	0–3	0–0	1–1	1–1	2–3
Gimpo FC	2–2	1–2	3–0	1–0	2–3	1–1	—	3–0	1–0	1–1	0–1	0–0	1–2	3–1
Gyeongnam FC	1–1	0–3	1–0	3–1	3–0	1–3	2–1	—	0–1	0–2	2–2	0–1	1–1	1–3
Hwaseong FC	0–0	0–1	1–0	2–1	2–1	1–1	0–1	1–1	—	0–1	1–2	1–0	0–1	1–1
Incheon United	4–2	1–0	1–1	3–0	2–1	2–1	3–0	2–0	2–0	—	2–0	1–2	1–0	2–0
Jeonnam Dragons	2–0	2–1	0–1	3–4	4–1	2–2	0–0	1–0	3–2	2–1	—	2–1	1–1	3–4
Seongnam FC	1–0	0–0	0–0	0–0	1–1	0–2	0–0	2–1	2–0	2–1	2–2	—	1–2	1–2
Seoul E-Land	1–1	3–2	1–4	3–0	0–2	2–1	1–1	2–1	0–0	0–0	1–1	0–1	—	4–2
Suwon Samsung Bluewings	3–1	4–1	1–1	2–0	1–0	0–0	1–1	4–0	3–1	1–2	2–1	3–2	0–2	—

Source: Soccerway
Legend: Blue = home team win; Yellow = draw; Red = away team win.

=== Matches 27–39 ===
Teams played each other once, either at home or away.

Home \ Away	ASG	BCN	BSI	CNC	CBCJ	CNAS	GIM	GNM	HWA	ICU	JND	SNM	SUE	SSB
Ansan Greeners	—	—	2–3	—	0–0	0–1	—	—	0–1	0–1	—	—	—	1–1
Bucheon FC 1995	2–0	—	—	2–1	—	—	—	—	0–0	1–0	—	1–0	2–2	—
Busan IPark	—	1–2	—	—	2–2	0–3	4–1	1–1	—	—	1–1	—	—	1–0
Cheonan City	0–0	—	0–0	—	—	—	—	—	2–2	3–4	—	1–3	2–5	—
Chungbuk Cheongju	—	0–0	—	0–1	—	—	0–2	0–1	—	—	0–3	0–1	0–2	—
Chungnam Asan	—	3–0	—	1–1	0–0	—	1–0	1–0	—	—	2–1	—	—	1–3
Gimpo FC	1–1	0–1	—	1–3	—	—	—	—	5–1	—	2–0	0–0	0–1	—
Gyeongnam FC	1–0	1–2	—	2–0	—	—	0–2	—	—	—	2–3	0–1	0–0	—
Hwaseong FC	—	—	1–1	—	1–0	1–1	—	0–1	—	0–1	—	—	—	2–3
Incheon United	—	—	0–0	—	0–1	1–1	1–2	3–0	—	—	—	—	—	1–1
Jeonnam Dragons	0–1	3–2	—	4–1	—	—	—	—	1–2	2–1	—	0–2	1–2	—
Seongnam FC	4–0	—	2–1	—	—	3–0	—	—	1–0	2–2	—	—	0–2	—
Seoul E-Land	6–0	—	3–0	—	—	4–1	—	—	1–1	0–0	—	—	—	0–1
Suwon Samsung Bluewings	—	2–2	—	5–0	2–0	—	1–1	1–2	—	—	2–2	2–2	—	—

Source: Soccerway
Legend: Blue = home team win; Yellow = draw; Red = away team win.

== Promotion play-offs ==
The first round was contested between the fourth and fifth-placed teams of the regular season at the home stadium of the fourth-placed team, and its winners played the third-placed team in the second round. When the first and second round matches were finished as draws, their winners were decided on the regular season rankings without extra time and penalty shoot-outs.

The winners of the second round, and the league runners-up competed with the tenth and eleventh-placed teams of the 2025 K League 1, respectively, in the final round. Each of the finals was a two-legged tie, with the winners securing the final spots in the 2026 K League 1.

The final first leg between Bucheon FC 1995 and Suwon FC was postponed from 4 December to 5 December due to heavy snow.

=== Bracket ===
First round
4	Seoul E-Land	0
5	Seongnam FC	1

Second round
3	Bucheon FC 1995	0
5	Seongnam FC	0

Final 2
Bucheon FC 1995	1	3	4
Suwon FC	0	2	2
Final 1
Suwon Samsung Bluewings	0	0	0
Jeju SK	1	2	3

=== First round ===
27 November 2025
19:00 UTC+9

Seoul E-Land	0–1	Seongnam FC
		Acevedo 84'

Mokdong Stadium, Seoul
Attendance: 4,147
Referee: Park Byeong-jin

=== Second round ===
30 November 2025
14:00 UTC+9

Bucheon FC 1995	0–0	Seongnam FC

Bucheon Stadium, Bucheon
Attendance: 6,171
Referee: Kim Yong-woo

=== Final round ===
Team 1	Agg.	Team 2	1st leg	2nd leg
Suwon Samsung Bluewings	0–3	Jeju SK	0–1	0–2
Bucheon FC 1995	4–2	Suwon FC	1–0	3–2

3 December 2025
19:00 UTC+9

Suwon Samsung Bluewings	0–1	Jeju SK
		Yuri 68' (pen.)

Suwon World Cup Stadium, Suwon
Attendance: 18,715
Referee: Shin Yong-jun
7 December 2025
14:00 UTC+9

Jeju SK	2–0	Suwon Samsung Bluewings
Kim Seung-sub 1'; Italo 45+4'

Jeju World Cup Stadium, Seogwipo, Jeju Province
Attendance: 18,912
Referee: Song Min-seok

Jeju SK won 3–0 on aggregate and therefore both clubs remain in their respective leagues.

5 December 2025
19:00 UTC+9

Bucheon FC 1995	1–0	Suwon FC
Bassani 46'

Bucheon Stadium, Bucheon
Attendance: 4,353
Referee: Kim Jong-hyeok
8 December 2025
19:00 UTC+9

Suwon FC	2–3	Bucheon FC 1995
Choi Chi-ung 83'; Sabbag 90+10' (pen.)		Bassani 15'; Kim Gyu-min 24'; Galego 46'

Suwon Sports Complex, Suwon
Attendance: 4,180
Referee: Seol Tae-hwan

Bucheon FC 1995 won 4–2 on aggregate and was promoted to K League 1, while Suwon FC was relegated to K League 2.

== Statistics ==
=== Top goalscorers ===
Rank	Player	Team	Goals
1	(Montenegro) Stefan Mugoša	Incheon United	20
2	(Colombia) Leonardo Acevedo	Seongnam FC	17
3	(Brazil) Valdívia	Jeonnam Dragons	16
4	(Colombia) Luis Mina	Gimpo FC	14
4	(Brazil) Rodrigo Bassani	Bucheon FC 1995	14
6	(Russia) Stanislav Iljutcenko	Suwon Samsung Bluewings	13
6	(Brazil) Matheus Serafim	Suwon Samsung Bluewings	13
8	(Brazil) Ronan David	Jeonnam Dragons	12
8	(Brazil) Fessin	Busan IPark	12
8	(Colombia) Jhon Montaño	Bucheon FC 1995	12
8	(South Korea) Kim Ji-hyeon	Suwon Samsung Bluewings	12
8	(Brazil) Euller	Seoul E-Land	12
8	(Guinea-Bissau) Gerso Fernandes	Incheon United	12

=== Top assist providers ===
Rank	Player	Team	Assists
1	(Brazil) Euller	Seoul E-Land	11
2	(Guinea-Bissau) Gerso Fernandes	Incheon United	10
3	(Brazil) Valdívia	Jeonnam Dragons	9
3	(South Korea) Shin Jae-won	Seongnam FC	9
5	(Uruguay) José Alberti	Jeonnam Dragons	8
6	(South Korea) Lee Ki-je	Suwon Samsung Bluewings	7
6	(Colombia) Paul Villero	Busan IPark	7
8	(Brazil) Ronan David	Jeonnam Dragons	6
8	(South Korea) Han Kyo-won	Chungnam Asan	6
8	(Russia) Stanislav Iljutcenko	Suwon Samsung Bluewings	6
8	(South Korea) Son Jun-ho	Chungnam Asan	6
8	(Brazil) Rodrigo Bassani	Bucheon FC 1995	6

== Awards ==
=== Weekly awards ===
Round	Player of the Round	
Round	Player	Club
1	(Colombia) Leonardo Acevedo	Seongnam FC
2	(Colombia) Luis Mina	Gimpo FC
3	(Brazil) Pedrinho	Seoul E-Land
4	(Brazil) Jefferson Galego	Bucheon FC 1995
5	(South Korea) Kim Hyun-tae	Ansan Greeners
6	(Brazil) Paulo Henrique	Suwon Samsung Bluewings
7	(Colombia) Leonardo Acevedo	Seongnam FC
8	(Brazil) Bruno Silva	Suwon Samsung Bluewings
9	(Brazil) Fessin	Busan IPark
10	(Colombia) Paul Villero	Busan IPark
11	(Guinea-Bissau) Gerso Fernandes	Incheon United
12	(South Korea) Kim Seung-ho	Chungnam Asan
13	(Montenegro) Stefan Mugoša	Incheon United
14	(South Korea) Baek Ga-on	Busan IPark
15	(South Korea) Han Kyo-won	Chungnam Asan
16	(South Korea) Park Seung-ho	Incheon United
17	(Brazil) Felipe Valdívia	Cheonan City
18	(South Korea) Park Chang-jun	Bucheon FC 1995
19	(Colombia) Luis Mina	Gimpo FC
20	(South Korea) Park Ju-yeong	Hwaseong FC

Round	Player of the Round	
Round	Player	Club
21	(Colombia) Jhon Montaño	Bucheon FC 1995
22	(Colombia) Paul Villero	Busan IPark
23	(South Korea) Kim Min-jun	Suwon Samsung Bluewings
24	(Brazil) Valdívia	Jeonnam Dragons
25	(Brazil) Ronan David	Jeonnam Dragons
26	(Guinea-Bissau) Gerso Fernandes	Incheon United
27	(South Korea) Seo Jae-min	Seoul E-Land
28	(Mali) Aboubacar Toungara	Cheonan City
29	(Brazil) Denisson Silva	Chungnam Asan
30	(South Korea) Park Dong-jin	Gimpo FC
31	(Brazil) Ronan David	Jeonnam Dragons
32	(Brazil) Valdívia	Jeonnam Dragons
33	(Brazil) Valdívia	Jeonnam Dragons
34	(Brazil) Matheus Serafim	Suwon Samsung Bluewings
35	(South Korea) Lee Eui-hyung	Bucheon FC 1995
36	(South Korea) Park Chang-hwan	Seoul E-Land
37	(Colombia) Luis Mina	Gimpo FC
38	(Brazil) Valdívia	Jeonnam Dragons
39	(Spain) Osmar	Seoul E-Land

=== Annual awards ===
The 2025 K League Awards was held on 1 December 2025.

Award	Winner	Club
Most Valuable Player	(Guinea-Bissau) Gerso Fernandes	Incheon United
Young Player of the Year	(South Korea) Park Seung-ho	Incheon United
Top goalscorer	(Montenegro) Stefan Mugoša	Incheon United
Top assist provider	(Brazil) Euller	Seoul E-Land
Manager of the Year	(South Korea) Yoon Jong-hwan	Incheon United

Position	Best XI			
Goalkeeper	(South Korea) Min Seong-jun (Incheon)			
Defenders	(South Korea) Shin Jae-won (Seongnam)	(Brazil) Venício Tomás (Seongnam)	(South Korea) Kim Geon-hui (Incheon)	(South Korea) Lee Ju-yong (Incheon)
Midfielders	(Brazil) Euller (Seoul E)	(Brazil) Valdívia (Jeonnam)	(South Korea) Lee Myung-joo (Incheon)	(Guinea-Bissau) Gerso Fernandes (Incheon)
Forwards	(Montenegro) Stefan Mugoša (Incheon)		(Colombia) Leonardo Acevedo (Seongnam)	

== Attendance ==
Pos	Team	Total	High	Low	Average	Change
1	Suwon Samsung Bluewings	240,967			12,048	+16.3%
2	Incheon United	193,302			10,174	−7.1%^{†}
3	Jeonnam Dragons	86,547			4,327	+10.6%
4	Seoul E-Land	75,594			3,979	−0.6%
5	Bucheon FC 1995	68,677			3,615	−1.4%
6	Busan IPark	65,606			3,280	+6.8%
7	Seongnam FC	58,410			3,074	+3.2%
8	Chungnam Asan	60,668			3,033	+22.0%
9	Gimpo FC	58,903			2,945	+5.4%
10	Ansan Greeners	54,880			2,888	+61.7%
11	Gyeongnam FC	55,396			2,770	−24.6%
12	Hwaseong FC	52,509			2,764	n/a
13	Cheonan City	52,212			2,748	+24.0%
14	Chungbuk Cheongju	53,799			2,690	−15.7%
	League total	1,177,470			4,313	+13.5%

Source: K League
Notes:
^{†} Team played previous season in K League 1.

== See also ==
- 2025 in South Korean football
- 2025 K League 1
- 2025 K3 League
- 2025 Korea Cup
