= Wellington Roberto =

Brazilian politician (born 1959)

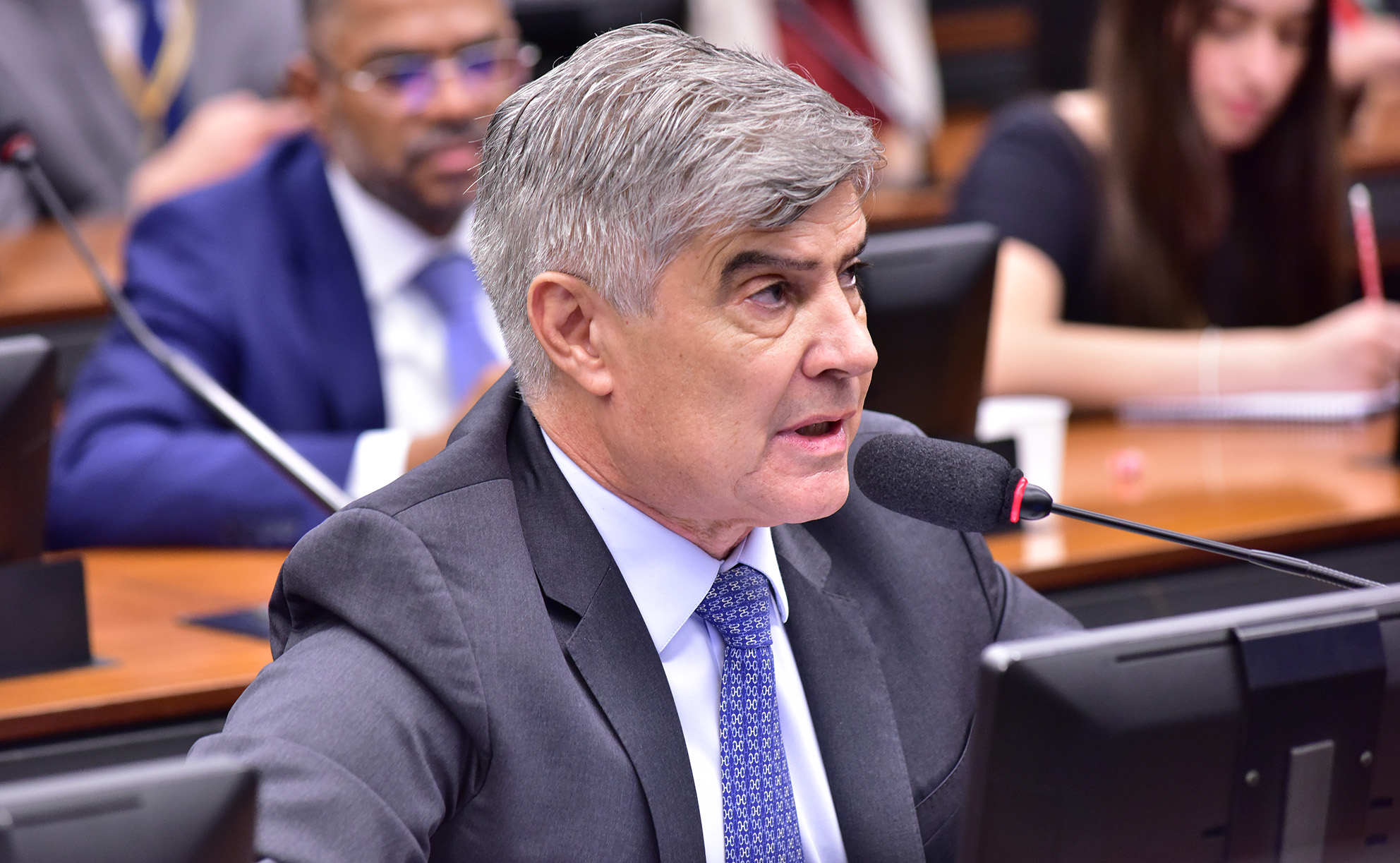
- Roberto in 2023

Member of the Chamber of Deputies
- Incumbent
- Assumed office 1 February 2003
- Constituency: Paraíba

Senator for Paraíba
- In office 13 April 1998 – 1 February 2003

Personal details
- Born: José Wellington Roberto; 19 May 1959 (age 67) São José de Piranhas, Paraíba, Brazil
- Party: PSD (2026–present)
- Other political affiliations: PMDB (1980–2001); PSDB (2001); PTB (2001–2005); PL (2005–2006); PL (2006–2026)

José Wellington Roberto (born 19 May 1959) is a Brazilian politician serving as a member of the Chamber of Deputies since 2003. From 1998 to 2003, he was a member of the Federal Senate.
