= Yongin FC =

- Full name: Yongin Football Club 용인시시민프로축구단
- Founded: 4 January 2026; 10 months ago
- Stadium: Yongin Mireu Stadium
- Capacity: 37,155
- Owner: Lee Sang-il
- Chairman: Kim Jin-hyung
- Manager: Choi Yun-kyum
- League: K League 2
- Website: https://www.yonginfc.co.kr/
Home colours	Away colours

Yongin FC (Korean: 용인 FC) is a South Korean professional football club based in Yongin, Gyeonggi. It plays in K League 2, the second tier of South Korean football.

== History ==
Early in 2025 Yongin mayor Lee Sang-il announced his intention to launch a professional football team in the city. The commitment was ratified in May 2025 and Kim Jin-hyung was appointed as chairman. The club subsequently appointed Choi Yun-kyum as Yongin FC's first manager and Lee Dong-gook as technical director.

In August 2025, the club received approval to join the K League, confirming its intention to participate in the 2026 K League 2. Ahead of the 2026 season, technical director Lee stated that the club aimed to "survive in midtable" in its first two years before making a push for a chance at promotion to K League 1 by 2030. On 16 January 2026, Yongin FC officially confirmed its participation in K League 2 following the final approval of its K League membership.

On March 1st, 2026, Yongin played its first ever game in K League 2, drawing 2–2 against Cheonan City with a penalty brace scored by club striker Gabriel Tigrão.

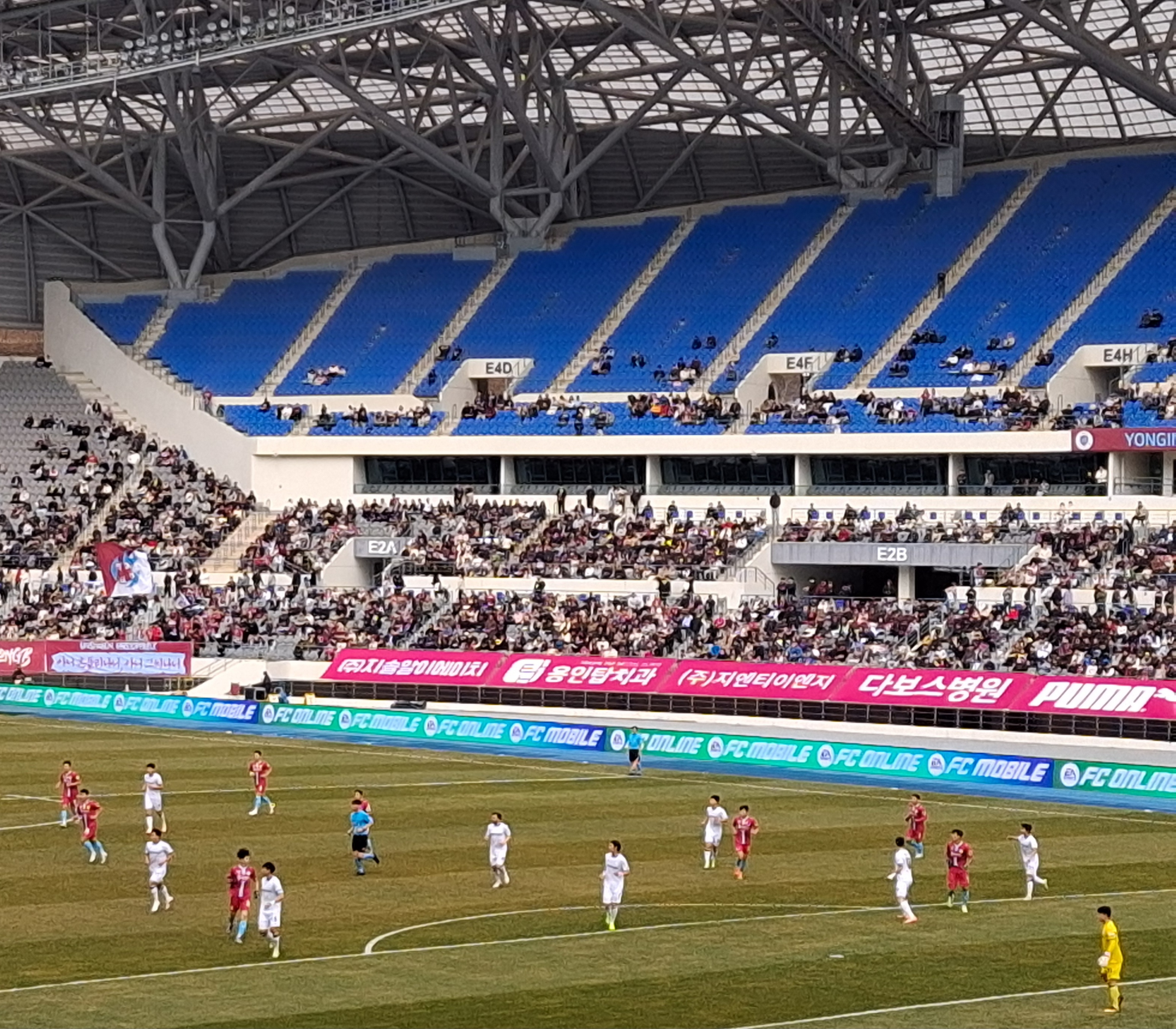
Yongin faces off against K League 2 rivals Cheonan City in the club's first ever game

== Club identity ==
In September 2025, Yongin FC revealed a shortlist of four emblems being considered for the club's badge, each incorporating a dragon's head, symbolic of Yongin City. The designs were criticised for being overly simplistic and lacking relevance to the local area, with football fans taking to online forums to post their own designs. The team colours are "Blood of Mireu Red" (claret) and "Celestial Blue" (sky blue).

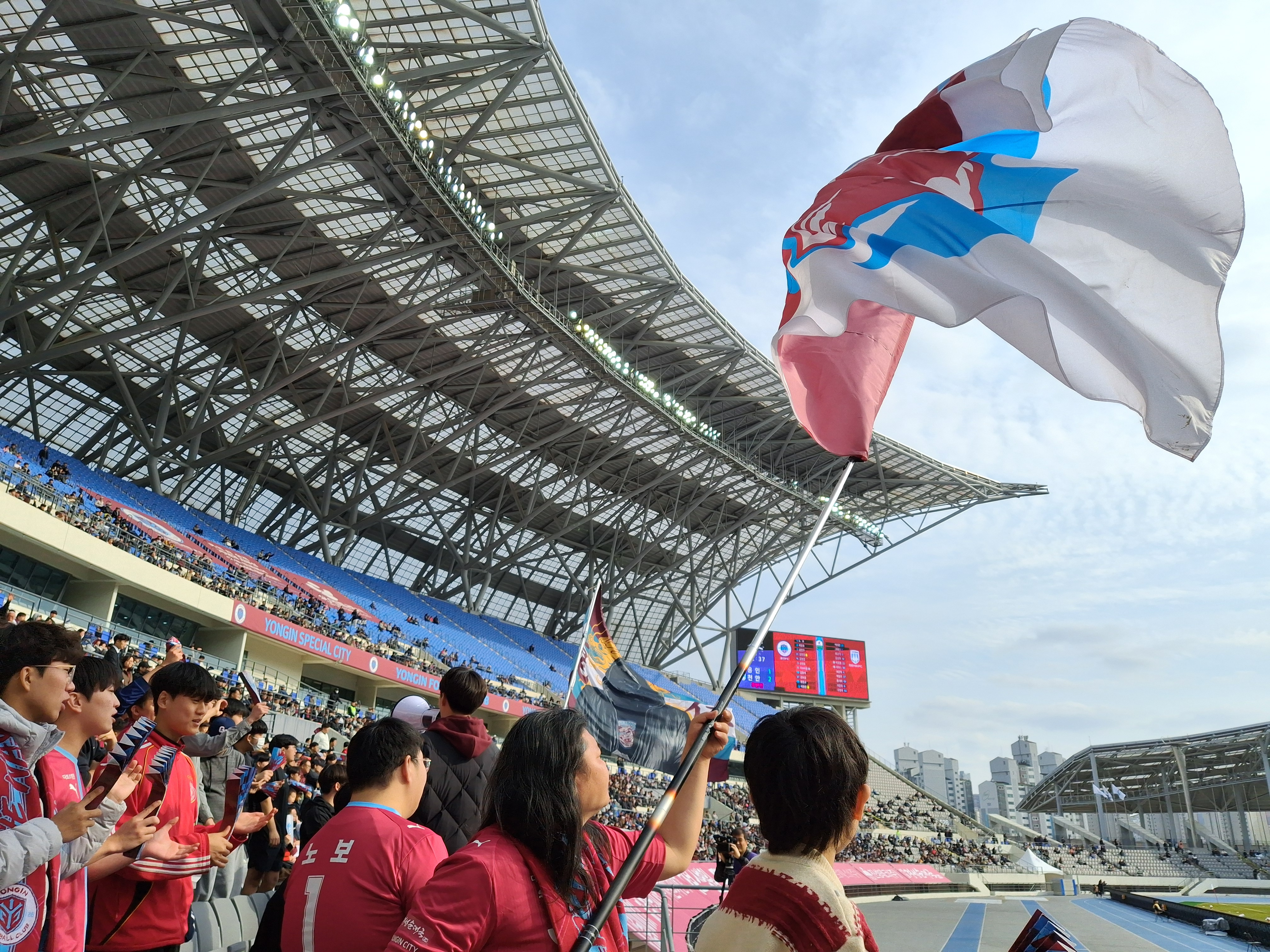
Yongin supporters in 2026

== Stadium ==
Yongin FC's home ground is Yongin Mireu Stadium, a multi-purpose stadium on the outskirts of the city. The stadium was built in 2017, opened in 2018 and has a capacity of 37,155. The club's operations were previously based in the Yongin Football Center before its land was sold to SK Hynix. It has since utilized the auxiliary facilities of the Mireu Stadium.

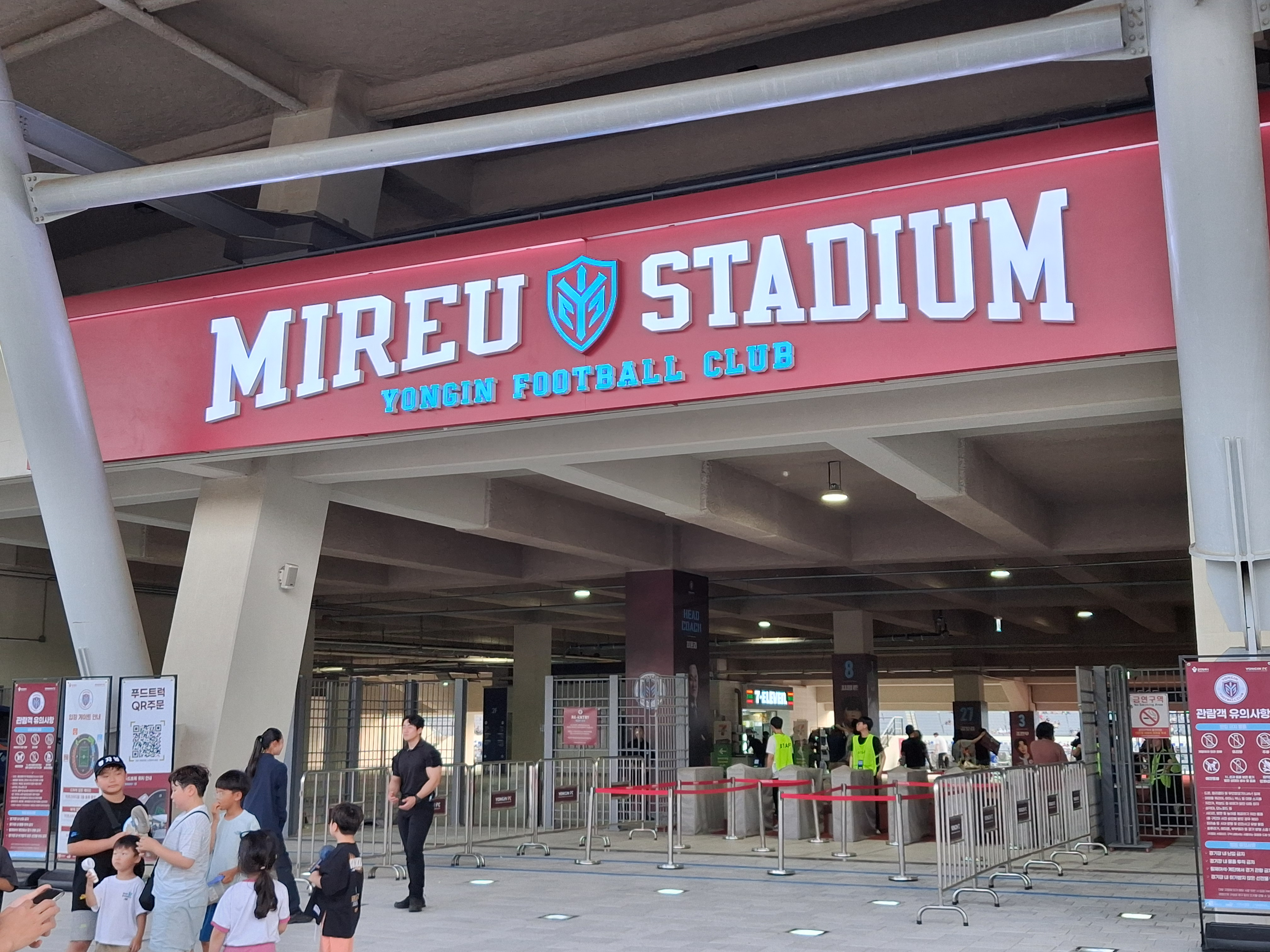
Entrance to the Mireu Stadium

== Current squad ==
As of 6 August 2026.

Note: Flags indicate national team as defined under FIFA eligibility rules; some limited exceptions apply. Players may hold more than one non-FIFA nationality.

No.	Pos.	Nation	Player
1	GK	POR	Emanuel Novo
2	DF	KOR	Kang Sin-myeong
3	DF	KOR	Cho Hyun-woo
4	DF	KOR	Kwak Yoon-ho (vice-captain)
5	DF	KOR	Lim Hyung-jin
7	FW	BRA	Vitinho
6	MF	KOR	Sin Jin-ho (captain)
8	MF	KOR	Choi Young-jun
9	FW	KOR	Suk Hyun-jun
10	FW	GBS	Jardel
11	FW	BRA	Gabriel Tigrão
12	MF	KOR	Cho Jae-hun
15	DF	KOR	Kim Hyeon-jun
17	MF	KOR	Jin Tae-ho (on loan from Jeonbuk Hyundai Motors)
18	DF	KOR	Lee Jae-hyung (on loan from Ulsan HD)

No.	Pos.	Nation	Player
19	FW	KOR	Yoo Dong-kyu
20	FW	KOR	Choi Chi-ung (on loan from Suwon FC)
21	GK	KOR	Hwang Sung-min
22	DF	KOR	Kim Han-gil
23	GK	KOR	Kim Min-jun
24	MF	KOR	Kim Jin-ho
26	DF	KOR	Lim Chai-min (vice-captain)
27	FW	KOR	Kim Bo-sub
30	MF	KOR	Lee Kyu-dong
31	GK	KOR	Roh Hee-dong
44	DF	KOR	Lee Jin-seop
66	MF	KOR	Kim Han-seo (on loan from Daejeon Hana Citizen)
77	DF	KOR	Lee Jae-jun
90	MF	KOR	Kim Dong-min

=== Out on loan ===
Note: Flags indicate national team as defined under FIFA eligibility rules; some limited exceptions apply. Players may hold more than one non-FIFA nationality.

No.	Pos.	Nation	Player
—	DF	KOR	Lee Seon-yu (at Siheung Citizen)

== Backroom staff ==
=== Coaching staff ===
- Manager: (South Korea) Choi Yun-kyum
- Assistant manager: (South Korea) Kim Sang-rok
- Goalkeeping coach: (South Korea) Lee Seung-jun
- Coach: (South Korea) Oh Beom-seok
- Analysis coach: (South Korea) Ryu Hyung-ryeol

== Managerial history ==
- Choi Yun-kyum (2025–present)

== Season by season records ==
League
Season	Division	Tier	Teams	Pld	W	D	L	GF	GA	GD	Pts	Position	Playoffs	Korea Cup
2026	K League 2	2	17	0										
