= Kim Hyeon-oh =

South Korean footballer (born 2007)

- Kim in 2025

Personal information
- Date of birth: September 12, 2007 (age 19)
- Place of birth: Cheongju, South Korea
- Height: 1.87 m (6 ft 2 in)
- Position: Striker

Team information
- Current team: Gyeongnam FC
- Number: 90

Youth career
- Cheongju FCK
- 2020: Jeonbuk Hyundai Motors U-15
- 2021–2022: Daejeon Hana Citizen U-15
- 2023–2025: Daejeon Hana Citizen U-18

Senior career*
Years	Team	Apps	(Gls)
2025–	Daejeon Hana Citizen	14	(1)
2026–	→ Gyeongnam FC (loan)	27	(9)

International career
2024	South Korea U17	3	(1)
2025–	South Korea U20	4	(0)
Korean name
Hangul	김현오
RR	Gim Hyeono
MR	Kim Hyŏno
- * Club domestic league appearances and goals as of November 7, 2026

Kim Hyeon-oh (Korean: 김현오; born September 12, 2007) is a South Korean professional footballer who plays as an striker for K League 2 club Gyeongnam FC, on loan from Daejeon Hana Citizen. He made his debut appearance in the 2025 K League 1 season, becoming the youngest goalscorer in Daejeon's club history. He has also represented South Korea's national youth teams.

== Early life and career beginnings ==
Kim with Cheongju FCK, 2018

Kim Hyeon-oh was born on September 12, 2007, in Cheongju, North Chungcheong Province. He is the younger of two children; he has an older sister. Kim began playing football recreationally with the Jikji FC youth team (now Chungbuk Cheongju FC) before joining Cheongju FCK. As a child, he served as a ball boy for Daejeon Hana Citizen.

At the third round of the 2016 Cheongju I-League, a youth soccer competition, Kim recorded a ball-kicking speed of 76 km/h (47 mph), ranking first in the elementary school grades 3–4 category. He received the Most Valuable Player (MVP) award at the Lower Grades Festival of the 2018 Gumsuk Cup National Championship, where Cheongju FCK U-12 won the title. In 2019, he was one of 19 recipients of the Outstanding Player Award at the Korea Youth Football Hwarang Awards. He also received the Forward Award at the 32nd Cha Bum-kun Football Awards.

Kim attended Geumsan Middle School and played for the Jeonbuk Hyundai U-15 team. He took a year-long break from football after developing Osgood–Schlatter disease. He subsequently enrolled in Sintan Jungang Middle School and joined the Daejeon Hana Citizen U-15 team in 2021. He later progressed to the club's U-18 team while attending Chungnam Mechanical Technical High School. He made seven appearances during the 2024 K League Junior Group B Weekend League (First Half), where he scored two goals and provided two assists; the team finished as the runner-up. The team also reached the semifinals of the 55th Busan MBC National High School Soccer Tournament, where he scored five goals in six matches.

== Senior career ==
Kim signed with Daejeon Hana Citizen ahead of the 2025 K League 1 season, becoming the third semi-professional player at the club following Ahn Tae-yoon in 2020 and Yoon Do-young in 2024. Kim was among eight high school students signed to a K League team that season. On May 3, 2025, he made his debut appearance as a starter against FC Anyang, scoring his first professional goal. At 17 years, seven months and 21 days old, he overtook Yoon to become the youngest goalscorer in Daejeon Hana Citizen's history and the youngest in K League 1 since the adoption of the promotion and relegation system in 2013. In July, he became the club's second player to be promoted to a professional contract from semi-professional, following Yoon in 2024. Kim made 14 appearances during the 2025 season. He received the Football Star Award at the 2025 Futures Star Awards.

In 2026, Kim joined K League 2 club Gyeongnam FC on loan for the season. On March 22, he made his first goal for the club in a 1–0 victory over Gimpo FC, securing Gyeongnam its first win of the season. He also scored his first brace and provided one assist in a 5–0 victory against Ansan Greeners FC. On October 31, he scored his ninth goal of the season.

== International career ==
Kim was called up for the South Korea national under-17 football team for a 2024 international friendly tournament hosted in Croatia, making three appearances and scoring one goal. He also represented South Korea at the 2025 FIFA U-20 World Cup.

== Style of play ==
Kim plays as a striker, but has been deployed as a winger. In his youth, he played both as a centre-forward or on the flanks. He has been commended for his "exceptional football intelligence" and technical abilities. He has cited Hwang In-beom and Ronaldo as his role models.

== Career statistics ==
=== Club ===
As of November 7, 2026.

Appearances and goals by club, season and competition
Club	Season	League			Cup		Continental		Other		Total	
Club	Season	Division	Apps	Goals	Apps	Goals	Apps	Goals	Apps	Goals	Apps	Goals
Daejeon Hana Citizen	2025	K League 1	14	1	0	0	0	0	0	0	14	1
Gyeongnam FC	2026	K League 2	27	9	0	0	0	0	0	0	27	9
Career total			41	10	0	0	0	0	0	0	41	10
