= Ryoji Fujimori =

Japanese footballer

Ryoji Fujimori 藤森 亮志
Personal information
- Date of birth: 11 April 1997 (age 29)
- Place of birth: Suwa, Nagano, Japan
- Height: 1.68 m (5 ft 6 in)
- Position: Midfielder

Team information
- Current team: Seongnam FC
- Number: 52

Youth career
- –2012: Suwa FC
- 2013–2015: Ueda Nishi High School

College career
Years	Team	Apps	(Gls)
2016–2019	Rissho University		

Senior career*
Years	Team	Apps	(Gls)
2020–2025	Nagano Parceiro	81	(8)
2026–	Seongnam FC	6	(0)
- * Club domestic league appearances and goals as of 6 August 2026

Ryoji Fujimori (藤森 亮志, Fujimori Ryōji; born 11 April 1997) is a Japanese footballer currently playing as a midfielder for Seongnam FC.

== Career ==
In 2020, Fujimori announce official first professional career with Nagano Parceiro.

On 28 November 2025, Fujimori announce official leave the club after expiration contract in Nagano.

On 16 January 2026, Fujimori was announce official transfer to K League 2 club, Seongnam FC for 2026 season.

== Career statistics ==
=== Club ===
As of 16 January 2026.

Club	Season	League			National Cup (Note: Includes Emperor's Cup, Korea Cup)		League Cup (Note: Includes J.League Cup)		Other		Total	
Club	Season	Division	Apps	Goals	Apps	Goals	Apps	Goals	Apps	Goals	Apps	Goals
Nagano Parceiro	2020	J3 League	9	1	0	0	–		0	0	9	1
Nagano Parceiro	2021	J3 League	8	2	1	0	–		0	0	9	2
Nagano Parceiro	2022	J3 League	21	3	0	0	–		0	0	21	3
Nagano Parceiro	2023	J3 League	13	0	1	0	–		0	0	14	0
Nagano Parceiro	2024	J3 League	11	0	2	1	1	0	0	0	14	1
Nagano Parceiro	2025	J3 League	19	2	1	0	1	0	0	0	21	2
Seongnam FC	2026	K League 2	0	0	0	0	–		0	0	0	0
Career total			81	8	4	1	2	0	0	0	87	9
