= Kim Sang-rok =

South Korean footballer (born 1979)

Kim Sang-Rok
Personal information
- Full name: Kim Sang-Rok
- Date of birth: 25 February 1979 (age 47)
- Place of birth: South Korea
- Height: 1.73 m (5 ft 8 in)
- Position: Midfielder

Team information
- Current team: Yongin FC (Assistant manager)

Youth career
- Korea University

Senior career*
| Years | Team | Apps | (Gls) |
| 2001–2003 | Pohang Steelers | 63 | (6) |
| 2004–2005 | Gwangju Sangmu Bulsajo (army) | 39 | (6) |
| 2006 | Jeju United | 20 | (4) |
| 2007–2009 | Incheon United | 59 | (6) |
| 2010 | Busan I'Park | 8 | (0) |
| 2011–2012 | Ulsan Hyundai Mipo | 14 | (0) |
| 2013 | Bucheon FC 1995 | 19 | (1) |
| 2017–2018 | Incheon Songwol | 0 | (0) |
- * Club domestic league appearances and goals as of 15 December 2018

- Kim Sang-rok
- Hangul: 김상록
- Hanja: 金相綠
- RR: Gim Sangrok
- MR: Kim Sangnok

Kim Sang-Rok (born February 25, 1979) is a South Korean former football player who play as a Midfielder and currently Assistant manager for K League 2 new club, Yongin FC.

== Club career statistics ==
| Club performance | | | League | | Cup | | League Cup | | Continental | | Total | |
| Season | Club | League | Apps | Goals | Apps | Goals | Apps | Goals | Apps | Goals | Apps | Goals |
| South Korea | | | League | | KFA Cup | | League Cup | | Asia | | Total | |
|---|---|---|---|---|---|---|---|---|---|---|---|---|
| 2001 | Pohang Steelers | K-League | 26 | 3 | ? | ? | 8 | 1 | - | | 34 | 4 |
| 2002 | Pohang Steelers | K-League | 9 | 1 | ? | ? | 6 | 0 | - | | 15 | 1 |
| 2003 | Pohang Steelers | K-League | 28 | 2 | 3 | 0 | - | | - | | 31 | 2 |
| 2004 | Gwangju Sangmu Bulsajo | K-League | 19 | 1 | 3 | 0 | 12 | 0 | - | | 34 | 1 |
| 2005 | Gwangju Sangmu Bulsajo | K-League | 20 | 5 | 0 | 0 | 10 | 0 | - | | 30 | 5 |
| 2006 | Jeju United | K-League | 20 | 4 | 0 | 0 | 12 | 2 | - | | 32 | 6 |
| 2007 | Incheon United | K-League | 26 | 5 | 4 | 2 | 11 | 5 | - | | 41 | 12 |
| 2008 | Incheon United | K-League | 22 | 1 | 1 | 0 | 5 | 0 | - | | 28 | 1 |
| 2009 | Incheon United | K-League | 11 | 0 | 1 | 0 | 4 | 1 | - | | 16 | 1 |
| 2010 | Busan I'Park | K-League | 8 | 0 | 0 | 0 | 5 | 0 | - | | 13 | 0 |
| 2011 | Ulsan Hyundai Mipo | National League | 10 | 0 | 2 | 0 | - | | - | | 12 | 0 |
| Total | South Korea | | 199 | 22 | 14 | 2 | 73 | 9 | - | | 286 | 33 |
| Career total | | | 199 | 22 | 14 | 2 | 73 | 9 | - | | 286 | 33 |
