= Kim Min-jun (footballer, born January 2000) =

South Korean footballer

Personal information
- Full name: Kim Min-jun
- Date of birth: 9 January 2000 (age 26)
- Place of birth: South Korea
- Height: 1.87 m (6 ft 2 in)
- Position: Goalkeeper

Team information
- Current team: Suwon Samsung Bluewings
- Number: 1

Youth career
- 2014–2015: Changnyeong Ttaogi FC
- 2016–2018: Boin HS

Senior career*
Years	Team	Apps	(Gls)
2019–2020	Shonan Bellmare	0	(0)
2019–2020	→ Fukushima United (loan)	4	(0)
2021–2024	Gyeongnam	22	(0)
2022	→ Gimhae City (loan)	13	(0)
2023	→ Cheonan City (loan)	28	(0)
2025–	Suwon Samsung Bluewings	10	(0)
- * Club domestic league appearances and goals as of 5 August 2026

- Kim Min-jun
- Hangul: 김민준
- RR: Gim Minjun
- MR: Kim Minjun

Kim Min-jun (Korean: 김민준; born 9 January 2000) is a South Korean footballer currently playing as a goalkeeper for Suwon Samsung Bluewings.

== Early life ==
Kim was born in South Korea. He played for Changnyeong Ttaogi FC and Boin HS in his youth.

== Career ==
Kim made his debut for Fukushima against Nagano Parceiro on 19 May 2019.

Kim made his debut for Gyeongnam FC against Anyang on 31 July 2021.

Kim made his debut for Gimhae City against Cheonan, on 6 August 2022.

Kim made his debut for Cheonan against Bucheon 1995 on 12 March 2023.

== Career statistics ==
=== Club ===
As of 29 June 2021

Appearances and goals by club, season and competition
Club	Season	League			National cup		League cup		Other		Total	
Club	Season	Division	Apps	Goals	Apps	Goals	Apps	Goals	Apps	Goals	Apps	Goals
Shonan Bellmare	2019	J1 League	0	0	0	0	0	0	0	0	0	0
Shonan Bellmare	2020	J1 League	0	0	0	0	0	0	0	0	0	0
Shonan Bellmare	Total		0	0	0	0	0	0	0	0	0	0
Fukushima United (loan)	2019	J3 League	1	0	0	0	—		0	0	1	0
Fukushima United (loan)	2020	J3 League	3	0	0	0	—		0	0	3	0
Fukushima United (loan)	Total		4	0	0	0	0	0	0	0	4	0
Gyeongnam	2021	K League 2	0	0	0	0	—		0	0	0	0
Career total			4	0	0	0	0	0	0	0	4	0
