= Felipe Valdívia =

Brazilian footballer

Personal information
- Full name: Felipe Sambudio Rosalen
- Date of birth: 27 October 2000 (age 26)
- Place of birth: Sumaré, Brazil
- Height: 1.74 m (5 ft 9 in)
- Position: Midfielder

Team information
- Current team: Cheonan City

Youth career
- 2016–2020: Atibaia
- 2017: → Figueirense (loan)

Senior career*
Years	Team	Apps	(Gls)
2020	Atibaia		
2020	→ Paulista (loan)	8	(0)
2021	Bahia de Feira	3	(1)
2021	EC São Bernardo	7	(0)
2022	Operário-MT	8	(0)
2023	Lemense	15	(1)
2023–2025	União São João	29	(4)
2023	→ Valerio (loan)	7	(2)
2024	→ Paranavaí (loan)	11	(2)
2024	→ Mirassol (loan)	3	(0)
2025–	Cheonan City	15	(2)
- * Club domestic league appearances and goals as of 30 August 2025

Felipe Sambudio Rosalen (born 27 October 2000), better known as Felipe Valdívia, is a Brazilian professional footballer who plays as a midfielder for Cheonan City.

== Career ==
Valdivia started his career at SC Atibaia (currently Lemense FC), Felipe Valdivia gained notoriety in 2023, for his great performance in the União São João title win in the fourth division of São Paulo, a club that had been away from football for years. Valdivia was loaned to Valerio de Itabira, he also helped in the club's runner-up finish in the Second Division of Minas Gerais. In November 2023, he renewed his contract with União São João.

The player was also an amateur champion of Americana for São Roque FC, a fact that generated controversy as the tournament was played alongside professional competitions. In August 2024, Valdívia was loaned to Mirassol until the end of the year. In 2025, after competing in the Campeonato Paulista Série A3, Valdívia transferred to Cheonan City of K League 2.

== Honours ==
União São João

- Campeonato Paulista Série A4: 2023
