= Euller (footballer, born 1995) =

Brazilian footballer (born 1995)

Personal information
- Full name: Elosman Euller Silva Cavalcanti
- Date of birth: 4 January 1995 (age 31)
- Place of birth: São José de Piranhas, Brazil
- Height: 1.73 m (5 ft 8 in)
- Positions: Winger; left-back

Team information
- Current team: Seoul E-Land FC
- Number: 7

Youth career
- Juventude-PB
- Sambatuck
- 2009–2011: Bahia
- 2011–2013: Vitória

Senior career*
Years	Team	Apps	(Gls)
2013–2017	Vitória	99	(5)
2017–2018	Avispa Fukuoka	19	(2)
2018–2019	Al-Shabab	10	(0)
2019	CSA	16	(0)
2020	Ferroviária	2	(0)
2020–2022	AEL Limassol	41	(5)
2022–2023	Chaves	21	(1)
2023–2024	Marítimo	44	(13)
2025–	Seoul E-Land FC	54	(16)

International career
2013	Brazil U20	1	(0)
2015	Brazil U23	4	(0)
Medal record
Representing Brazil
Men's Football
Pan American Games
Bronze medal – third place	2015 Toronto	Team competition
- * Club domestic league appearances and goals as of 5 August 2026

Elosman Euller Silva Cavalcanti (born 4 January 1995), simply known as Euller, is a Brazilian professional footballer who plays as a winger or left-back for K League 2 club Seoul E-Land FC.

== Club career ==
Born in São José de Piranhas, Paraíba, Euller graduated with Vitória's youth setup, after being released by Bahia. On 14 August 2013 he made his first team – and Série A – debut, starting in a 3–1 home win against Ponte Preta.

On 16 September 2013, Euller signed a new deal with Vitória, until the end of 2017.

In August 2017, J2 League side Avispa Fukuoka announced the signing of Euller.

In June 2018, Euller signed for Saudi Pro League club Al-Shabab.

In August 2019, he returned to Brazil, signing for Série A side CSA.

In January 2020, Euller moved to another Brazilian club, Ferroviária, on a free transfer.

In June 2020, Cypriot First Division side AEL Limassol announced the signing of Euller on a three-year contract.

On 20 July 2022, after 2 years playing in Cyprus, Euller moved to Portugal, signing for recently promoted to Primeira Liga club Chaves.

On 16 August 2023, recently relegated to Liga Portugal 2 side Marítimo announced the signing of Euller on a two-year contract.

On 14 January 2025, Euller joined K League 2 side Seoul E-Land FC.

== Career statistics ==
=== Club ===
As of 29 December 2024

Appearances and goals by club, season and competition
Club	Season	League			State League		Cup		League Cup		Continental		Other		Total	
Club	Season	Division	Apps	Goals	Apps	Goals	Apps	Goals	Apps	Goals	Apps	Goals	Apps	Goals	Apps	Goals
Vitória	2013	Série A	9	0	—		—		—		2 (Note: Appearance(s) in Copa Sudamericana)	0	—		11	0
Vitória	2014	Série A	9	0	5 (Note: Appearance(s) in Campeonato Baiano)	0	1	0	—		1	0	5 (Note: Appearance(s) in Copa do Nordeste)	0	21	0
Vitória	2015	Série B	11	1	8	0	1	0	—		—		7	1	27	2
Vitória	2016	Série A	27	1	2	0	3	0	—		1	0	—		33	1
Vitória	2017	Série A	2	0	9	1	5	0	—		—		5	1	21	2
Vitória	Total		58	2	24	1	10	0	—		4	0	17	2	113	5
Avispa Fukuoka	2017	J2 League	5	0	—		—		—		—		0	0	5	0
Avispa Fukuoka	2018	J2 League	14	2	—		0	0	—		—		—		14	2
Avispa Fukuoka	Total		19	2	—		0	0	—		—		0	0	19	2
Al Shabab	2018–19	Saudi Pro League	10	0	—		0	0	—		—		—		10	0
CSA	2019	Série A	16	0	—		—		—		—		0	0	16	0
Ferroviária	2020	Série D	—		2 (Note: Appearance(s) in Campeonato Paulista)	0	1	0	—		—		—		3	0
AEL Limassol	2020–21	Cypriot First Division	14	1	—		2	0	—		—		—		16	1
AEL Limassol	2021–22	Cypriot First Division	27	4	—		4	0	—		4 (Note: Appearance(s) in UEFA Europa Conference League)	0	—		35	4
AEL Limassol	Total		41	5	—		6	0	—		4	0	—		51	5
Chaves	2022–23	Primeira Liga	21	1	—		0	0	3	0	—		—		24	1
Chaves	2023–24	Primeira Liga	0	0	—		—		0	0	—		—		0	0
Chaves	Total		21	1	—		0	0	3	0	—		—		24	1
Marítimo	2023–24	Liga Portugal 2	28	8	—		4	1	—		—		—		32	9
Marítimo	2024–25	Liga Portugal 2	16	5	—		1	1	—		—		—		17	6
Marítimo	Total		44	13	—		5	2	—		—		—		49	15
Career Total			209	23	26	1	18	1	3	0	8	0	17	2	280	27

== Honours ==
Vitória

- Campeonato Baiano: 2013, 2016, 2017
