= Jardel (footballer, born 1997) =

Bissau-Guinean footballer (born 1997)

Personal information
- Full name: Esmiraldo Sá da Silva
- Date of birth: 22 September 1997 (age 29)
- Place of birth: Bissau, Guinea-Bissau
- Height: 1.84 m (6 ft 0 in)
- Position: Forward

Team information
- Current team: Yongin FC
- Number: 10

Youth career
- –2014: Barreirense
- 2014–2015: Rio Ave

Senior career*
Years	Team	Apps	(Gls)
2015–2018	Deportivo Fabril	49	(8)
2018–2019	Real Valladolid Promesas	11	(0)
2019	Algeciras	8	(1)
2020	Mérida	5	(1)
2020–2021	Leça	17	(7)
2021–2023	Feirense	39	(11)
2023–2024	Vizela	13	(0)
2024	→ Radomiak Radom (loan)	9	(2)
2024–2025	Ironi Kiryat Shmona	23	(3)
2025–2026	Hapoel Jerusalem	4	(0)
2026–	Yongin FC	2	(0)

International career^{‡}
2015	Portugal U18	2	(0)
2023–	Guinea-Bissau	11	(1)
- * Club domestic league appearances and goals as of 6 August 2026 ‡ National team caps and goals as of 27 June 2025

Esmiraldo Sá da Silva (born 22 September 1997), known professionally as Jardel, is a Bissau-Guinean professional footballer who plays as a forward for K League 2 club Yongin FC and the Guinea-Bissau national team.

== Career ==
Jardel started his senior career with Spanish third-tier side Deportivo Fabril. In 2020, he signed for Leça in the Portuguese third tier. In 2021, Jardel signed for Portuguese second-tier club Feirense. On 21 August 2022, he went viral on the internet after scoring a penalty with an unusual run-up and then missing a 90th-minute penalty using the same run-up during a 1–1 draw with Leixões.

On 24 June 2023, Jardel signed a three-year contract with Primeira Liga club Vizela.

On 14 February 2024, he joined Polish Ekstraklasa club Radomiak Radom on loan until the end of the season, with an option to make the move permanent. Two days later, he made his debut in the starting line-up in a 0–4 home loss against Pogoń Szczecin. He returned to Vizela at the end of June 2024.

In August 2024, Jardel joined Israeli Premier League club Ironi Kiryat Shmona on a two-year contract.

On 13 January 2026, Jardel moved to South Korea, joining recently-established K League 2 club Yongin FC.
