= Matheus Frizzo =

Brazilian footballer

Personal information
- Full name: Matheus Henrique Frizzo
- Date of birth: 24 July 1998 (age 28)
- Place of birth: Guarulhos, Brazil
- Height: 1.82 m (6 ft 0 in)
- Position: Midfielder

Team information
- Current team: Suwon FC
- Number: 10

Youth career
- 2009–2014: Corinthians
- 2014–2018: São Paulo
- 2018–2019: Grêmio

Senior career*
Years	Team	Apps	(Gls)
2019–2022	Grêmio	2	(0)
2020	→ Atlético Goianiense (loan)	4	(0)
2020–2021	→ Vitória (loan)	17	(0)
2021	→ Botafogo (loan)	31	(1)
2022–2025	Tombense	58	(8)
2024	→ Coritiba (loan)	47	(14)
2025	→ Novorizontino (loan)	40	(5)
2026–	Suwon FC	18	(10)
- * Club domestic league appearances and goals as of 5 August 2026

Matheus Henrique Frizzo (born 24 July 1998) is a Brazilian professional footballer who plays as a midfielder for K League 2 club Suwon FC.

== Professional career ==
A youth product of Corinthians, Frizzo was released in 2014 after tweeting admiration to his idol Kaká for signing with Corinthians' rival São Paulo. São Paulo ended up signing Frizzo to their youth academy in 2015.

On 2 February 2018, Frizzo signed with Grêmio. Frizzo made his professional debut with Grêmio in a 3-2 Campeonato Brasileiro Série A loss to Goiás on 8 December 2019.

== Títulos ==
Grêmio

- Campeonato Gaúcho: 2018, 2019, 2022

Botafogo

- Campeonato Brasileiro Série B: 2021
