= Kim Hae-woon =

South Korean footballer (born 1973)

Kim Hae-Woon
Personal information
- Full name: Kim Hae-Woon
- Date of birth: December 25, 1973 (age 52)
- Place of birth: Incheon, South Korea
- Height: 1.85 m (6 ft 1 in)
- Position: Goalkeeper

Team information
- Current team: Indonesia

Youth career
- Daegu University

Senior career*
Years	Team	Apps	(Gls)
1996–2008	Seongnam Ilhwa Chunma	142	(0)

International career^{‡}
1992–1993	South Korea U-20		
2000	South Korea	0	(0)

Managerial career
- 2010: Jeonbuk Hyundai U-18 (Goalkeeper coach)
- 2011: Henan Construction (Goalkeeper coach)
- 2013: Gyeongnam FC (Goalkeeper coach)
- 2015–2016: Seongnam FC (Goalkeeper coach)
- 2016–2017: South Korea U-20 (Goalkeeper coach)
- 2017–2018: South Korea (Goalkeeper coach)
- 2020–2021: Indonesia (Goalkeeper coach)
- * Club domestic league appearances and goals as of 27 December 2008 ‡ National team caps and goals as of 3 November 2007

- Kim Hae-woon
- Hangul: 김해운
- Hanja: 金海運
- RR: Gim Haeun
- MR: Kim Haeun

Kim Hae-Woon (born December 25, 1973) is a South Korean former football goalkeeper and currently goalkeeper coach of Henan Construction.

== Career ==
Kim has represented South Korea at youth level but, although part of the senior team squads (e.g. he was the third choice goalkeeper for the 2003 East Asian Cup) he never went on to play a match for them.

In 1996, he made his debut for Ilhwa Chunma (then based in Cheonan and known as Cheonan Ilhwa Chunma). Before the start of the 2000 season, Kim, together with the entire club moved to Seongnam. The move was highly successful and the club (now known as Seongnam Ilhwa Chunma) took over from Suwon Samsung Bluewings as the dominant force in Korean soccer.

By the end of the 2007 season, Kim had played 197 times for the Ilhwa Chunma franchise and in that time conceded 212 goals.

On 23 May 2009, he announced his retirement.

He was appointed as the U-18 team goalkeeper coach of Jeonbuk Hyundai Motors on 3 March 2010.

== Club career statistics ==
Club performance			League		Cup		League Cup		Continental		Total	
Season	Club	League	Apps	Goals	Apps	Goals	Apps	Goals	Apps	Goals	Apps	Goals
South Korea			League		KFA Cup		League Cup		Asia		Total	
1996	Cheonan Ilhwa Chunma / Seongnam Ilhwa Chunma	K-League	1	0			0	0				
1997	Cheonan Ilhwa Chunma / Seongnam Ilhwa Chunma	K-League	1	0			6	0				
1998	Cheonan Ilhwa Chunma / Seongnam Ilhwa Chunma	K-League	13	0			17	0	-			
1999	Cheonan Ilhwa Chunma / Seongnam Ilhwa Chunma	K-League	17	0			2	0	-			
2000	Cheonan Ilhwa Chunma / Seongnam Ilhwa Chunma	K-League	19	0			8	0				
2001	Cheonan Ilhwa Chunma / Seongnam Ilhwa Chunma	K-League	22	0			8	0				
2002	Cheonan Ilhwa Chunma / Seongnam Ilhwa Chunma	K-League	13	0			11	0				
2003	Cheonan Ilhwa Chunma / Seongnam Ilhwa Chunma	K-League	22	0	1	0	-					
2004	Cheonan Ilhwa Chunma / Seongnam Ilhwa Chunma	K-League	20	0	0	0	2	0				
2005	Cheonan Ilhwa Chunma / Seongnam Ilhwa Chunma	K-League	9	0	1	0	0	0	-		10	0
2006	Cheonan Ilhwa Chunma / Seongnam Ilhwa Chunma	K-League	5	0	0	0	1	0	-		6	0
2007	Cheonan Ilhwa Chunma / Seongnam Ilhwa Chunma	K-League	0	0	1	0	0	0	0	0	1	0
2008	Cheonan Ilhwa Chunma / Seongnam Ilhwa Chunma	K-League	0	0	0	0	4	0	-		4	0
Total	South Korea		142	0			59	0				
Career total			142	0			59	0				

== Honours ==
=== Club ===
Seongnam FC

- K League 1 (4) : 2001, 2002, 2003, 2006
- Korean FA Cup (1) : 1999
- K-League Cup (2) : 2002, 2004
- Korean Super Cup (1) : 2002
- AFC Champions League Runners-up (2) : 1996–97, 2004
- Asian Super Cup (1): 1996
- A3 Champions Cup (1): 2004
- Afro-Asian Club Championship (1) : 1996

=== International ===
- EAFF East Asian Cup (1) : 2003
