= Paul Villero =

Colombian footballer (born 1998)

Personal information
- Full name: Paul Breitner Villero Arevalo
- Date of birth: 7 October 1998 (age 28)
- Place of birth: Bogotá, Colombia
- Height: 1.69 m (5 ft 7 in)
- Positions: Midfielder; winger; forward

Team information
- Current team: Seongnam FC
- Number: 10

Senior career*
Years	Team	Apps	(Gls)
–2019	Ovetense		
2019–2022	Rubio Ñu		
2023	Náutico	28	(4)
2023–2024	Ponte Preta	13	(1)
2024	→ Athletic (loan)	24	(2)
2025	Busan IPark	36	(6)
2026–	Seongnam FC	13	(1)
- * Club domestic league appearances and goals as of 6 August 2026

Paul Breitner Villero Arevalo (born 7 October 1998) is a Colombian professional footballer who plays as a midfielder, winger, or forward for Seongnam FC.

== Early life ==
Villero was born on 7 October 1998 in Bogotá, Colombia. Growing up, he worked as a shoe salesman.

== Career ==
Villero started his career with Paraguayan side Ovetense. In 2019, he signed for Paraguayan side Rubio Ñu. Three years later, he signed for Brazilian side Náutico, where he made twenty-eight league appearances and scored four goals. Following his stint there, he signed for Brazilian side Ponte Preta in 2023, where he made thirteen league appearances and scored one goal.

During April 2024, he was sent on loan to Brazilian side Athletic, where he made twenty-four league appearances and scored two goals and helped the club achieve promotion from the third tier to the second tier. Ahead of the 2025 season, he signed for South Korean side Busan IPark.

On 15 January 2026, Villero announce official signing to fellow K League 2 club, Seongnam FC for 2026 season.

== Style of play ==
Villero plays as a midfielder, winger, or forward and is right-footed. Brazilian news website Terra wrote in 2025 that he has consistently contributed to playmaking and coordinating the attack, being used both as a playmaker and in more advanced positions. His presence has been valued... for his ability to maintain possession of the ball under pressure and his vision of the game in decisive situations".
