= Lim Kwan-sik =

South Korean footballer (born 1975)

Lim Kwan-Sik
Personal information
- Full name: Lim Kwan-Sik
- Date of birth: 28 July 1975 (age 51)
- Place of birth: South Korea
- Position: Midfielder

Team information
- Current team: Gwangju FC (coach)

Youth career
- Honam University

Senior career*
Years	Team	Apps	(Gls)
1998–2003	Chunnam Dragons	113	(5)
2004–2006	Busan Icons	53	(1)
2007–2008	Chunnam Dragons	17	(0)

International career
2000	South Korea	2	(0)
- * Club domestic league appearances and goals

Lim Kwan-Sik (Korean: 임관식; born 28 July 1975) is a South Korean retired footballer who played as a midfielder. He made his national team debut on 21 January 2000 at friendly against New Zealand.
