= São José de Piranhas =

Coordinates: 7°07′S 38°30′W

São José de Piranhas-PB
- Municipality
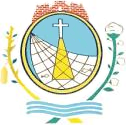
- Coat of arms
- Interactive map of São José de Piranhas-PB
- Country: Brazil
- Region: Northeast
- State: Paraíba
- Mesoregion: Sertao Paraibana

Population (2020)
  - Total: 20,329
- Time zone: UTC−3 (BRT)

São José de Piranhas is a municipality in the state of Paraíba in the Northeast Region of Brazil.

== See also ==
- List of municipalities in Paraíba
