= Choi Yun-kyum =

South Korean footballer and manager (born 1962)

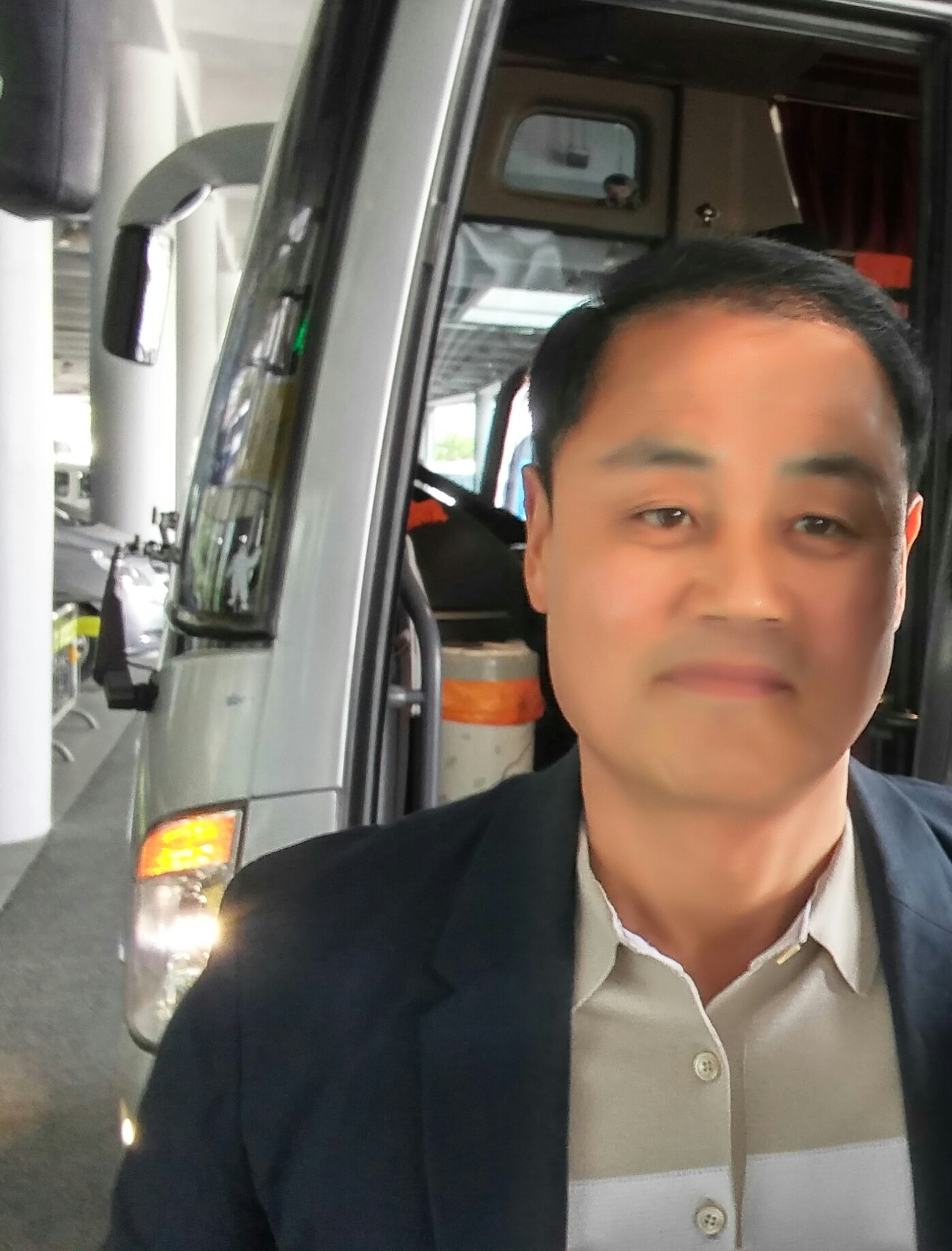

Personal information
- Full name: Choi Yun-kyum
- Date of birth: 21 April 1962 (age 64)
- Place of birth: Daejeon, South Korea
- Height: 1.78 m (5 ft 10 in)
- Position: Defender

Team information
- Current team: Yongin FC (Manager)

Youth career
- University of Incheon

Senior career*
| Years | Team | Apps | (Gls) |
| 1986–1992 | Yukong Elephants | 153 | (5) |

International career
| 1988 | South Korea U-23 (as wild card) | | |
| 1987–1988 | South Korea | 5 | (0) |

Managerial career
- 1993–2001: Yukong / Bucheon SK (coach)
- 2001: Bucheon SK (caretaker manager)
- 2001–2002: Bucheon SK
- 2003–2007: Daejeon Citizen
- 2011–2014: Hoàng Anh Gia Lai
- 2015–2017: Gangwon FC
- 2018: Busan IPark
- 2019: Jeju United
- 2022–2024: Chungbuk Cheongju FC
- 2025–: Yongin FC
- * Club domestic league appearances and goals

- Choi Yun-kyum
- Hangul: 최윤겸
- Hanja: 崔允謙
- RR: Choe Yungyeom
- MR: Ch'oe Yun'gyŏm

Choi Yun-kyum (Korean: 최윤겸; born April 21, 1962) is a South Korean football manager and former footballer who played as a defender. He is currently the manager of new K League 2 club, Yongin FC. He played in the K-League for Yukong Elephants from 1985 to 1992. After he retired, he moved into coaching, firstly as an assistant coach and later as head coach position. His son, Choi Min-ho, is currently a member of the boy band SHINee.

== Club & national career ==
Choi Yun-Kyum made his debut in the K-League in 1985 as a Yukong Elephants defender. As a player, he appeared in 162 games. He was selected in the National Olympic Team and National A-Team, playing 5 games at international level, including at the 1988 Seoul Olympics. He retired as a football player in 1992.

== Managerial career ==
After retirement, Choi decided to become a coach. He started his coaching life as a Training Coach at Bucheon SK, since renamed Yukong Elephants. Two years later, he was promoted as a coach. Four years later, he was chosen to become the Assistant Coach. Finally, after years of diligence, Choi was appointed as Bucheon SK's head coach for the 2001 season. However, though he had no problems with the team and was able to lead it fairly well, the Bucheon SK board decided to change their manager.

In 2003, after the poor results of their 2002 season, Daejeon Citizen selected Choi as their coach. Choi, originally from Daejeon, willingly came back to his hometown. The lack of results in 2002 was frustrating for fans and players, and confidence was low. However, Choi inspired the team and completely changed it by implementing a 4-3-3 formation. Daejeon Citizen finished the 2003 season in 6th place, its best finish ever in the league, and at the same time improved its average home game attendance to about 18,000 people. He continued his role as manager into the 2007 K-League season, before being replaced mid-season by Kim Ho.

In addition to his management skills, Choi is also famous for his humble personality - a key factor in ensuring a harmonious team, once quoting "I want to make this the team that a player chooses on his own volition, and not by my own will or force. I shall not buy abilities and just gather the best players. This will be a team played by humans, a team that players love, and a team who dreams the same dreams as the fans."

On October 10, 2011, he signed a one-year contract to V-League's Hoàng Anh Gia Lai - one of the most popular football club of Vietnam.

Choi returned to the K League 2 managing Gangwon FC in 2015. He managed to lead them to the K League 1 via the playoffs in 2016.

In 2018, Choi left Gangwon to become the manager of K League 2 team Busan IPark, but resigned after only one season after failing to gain promotion. Busan IPark finished third in the K League 2 but lost to FC Seoul in the promotion/relegation playoff final.

In 2019, Choi joined Jeju United FC, but left from the club as manager.

In 2022, Choi signed K League 2 side joining from K3 League, Cheongju FC from 2023 season.

In 2025, Choi signed new team K League 2, Yongin FC from 2026 season.

== Club career statistics ==
All-Time Club Performance
| Club | Season | League | | | League Cup | | | AFC Champions League | | | Total | | |
| Club | Season | Apps | Goals | Assts | Apps | Goals | Assts | Apps | Goals | Assts | Apps | Goals | Assts |
|---|---|---|---|---|---|---|---|---|---|---|---|---|---|
| Yukong Elephants | 1986 | 9 | 0 | 0 | 1 | 0 | 0 | — | — | — | 10 | 0 | 0 |
| Yukong Elephants | 1987 | 27 | 1 | 0 | — | — | — | — | — | — | 27 | 1 | 0 |
| Yukong Elephants | 1988 | 11 | 0 | 1 | — | — | — | — | — | — | 11 | 0 | 1 |
| Yukong Elephants | 1989 | 30 | 1 | 0 | — | — | — | — | — | — | 30 | 1 | 0 |
| Yukong Elephants | 1990 | 21 | 0 | 0 | — | — | — | — | — | — | 21 | 0 | 0 |
| Yukong Elephants | 1991 | 37 | 1 | 0 | — | — | — | — | — | — | 37 | 1 | 0 |
| Yukong Elephants | 1992 | 18 | 2 | 0 | 8 | 0 | 0 | — | — | — | 26 | 2 | 0 |
| Yukong Elephants | Total | 153 | 5 | 1 | 9 | 0 | 0 | — | — | — | 162 | 5 | 1 |
| Career totals | | 153 | 5 | 1 | 9 | 0 | 0 | — | — | — | 162 | 5 | 1 |

== Managerial statistics ==
As of the start from 2026 season.

| Team | From | To | Record | | | | |
| Team | From | To | P | W | D | L | Win % |
|---|---|---|---|---|---|---|---|
| Chungbuk Cheongju FC | 8 November 2022 | 1 October 2024 | 71 | 23 | 28 | 20 | 32.39 |
| Yongin FC | 2025 | Present | 0 | 0 | 0 | 0 | — |
| Total | | | 71 | 23 | 28 | 20 | 32.39 |
