= Matheus Serafim =

Brazilian footballer

Personal information
- Full name: Matheus Bonadiman Serafim
- Date of birth: 14 May 1998 (age 28)
- Place of birth: Cachoeiro de Itapemirim, Brazil
- Height: 1.78 m (5 ft 10 in)
- Position: Winger

Team information
- Current team: Daegu FC
- Number: 10

Youth career
- 2017: Guarani

Senior career*
Years	Team	Apps	(Gls)
2017–2018	Guarani	11	(0)
2018–2019	Oliveirense	5	(0)
2020	Alverca B	4	(3)
2020	Primavera	7	(1)
2020	União Barbarense	7	(1)
2021	Monte Azul	9	(0)
2021	Portuguesa	5	(0)
2022	União Suzano	18	(3)
2022–2023	Retrô	21	(3)
2023–2024	São José-SP	17	(3)
2024	→ Amazonas (loan)	33	(6)
2025	Suwon Samsung Bluewings	37	(13)
2026–	Daegu FC	19	(5)
- * Club domestic league appearances and goals as of 5 August 2026

Matheus Bonadiman Serafim (born 14 May 1998) is a Brazilian professional footballer who plays as a right winger for Daegu FC.

== Career ==
=== Guarani ===
Born in Cachoeiro do Itapemirim, Espírito Santo, Serafim only played amateur football in his home state before joining Guarani's youth sides in 2017, aged already 18, after a trial period. He made his senior debut with the club on 22 July of that year, coming on as a second-half substitute for Caíque in a 1–1 away draw against CRB.

=== Portugal ===
On 31 August 2018, after being rarely used, Serafim moved abroad and joined Portuguese LigaPro side Oliveirense on a three-year contract. He made his debut abroad on 22 September, replacing compatriot Alef Manga in a 1–1 home draw against Porto B, but also featured rarely for his new side.

On 18 July 2019, Serafim moved to Alverca. However, he only featured with the B-team in the Lison FA Second Division.

=== Return to Brazil ===
Ahead of the 2020 season, Serafim returned to his home country and joined Primavera. In October of that year, he was registered in the squad of União Barbarense for the Campeonato Paulista Segunda Divisão, before moving to Monte Azul the following February.

On 3 June 2021, Serafim signed for Série D side Portuguesa. He began the 2022 season at Campeonato Paulista Série A3 side União Suzano, before being announced at Retrô on 18 May.

Seafim renewed his contract with Retrô in October 2022, and helped the side to reach the 2023 Campeonato Pernambucano finals. In May 2023, he agreed to a three-year deal with São José-SP.

On 20 April 2024, São José announced Serafim's loan to Amazonas in the second division until the end of the year. He quickly gained prominence at the club, especially due to his performance against Flamengo in the 2024 Copa do Brasil.

== Career statistics ==
As of 22 November 2024.

Club	Season	League			State league		Cup		Continental		Other		Total	
Club	Season	Division	Apps	Goals	Apps	Goals	Apps	Goals	Apps	Goals	Apps	Goals	Apps	Goals
Guarani	2017	Série B	4	0	—		—		—		—		4	0
Guarani	2018	Série B	2	0	5	0	—		—		—		7	0
Guarani	Total		6	0	5	0	—		—		—		11	0
Oliveirense	2018–19	LigaPro	5	0	—		1	0	—		—		6	0
Alverca B	2019–20	Lisbon FA Second Division	4	3	—		—		—		—		4	3
Primavera	2020	Paulista A2	—		7	1	—		—		—		7	1
União Barbarense	2020	Paulista 2ª Divisão	—		7	1	—		—		—		7	1
Monte Azul	2021	Paulista A2	—		9	0	—		—		—		9	0
Portuguesa	2021	Série D	5	0	—		—		—		7 (Note: Appearance(s) in Copa Paulista)	0	12	0
União Suzano	2022	Paulista A3	—		18	3	—		—		—		18	3
Retrô	2022	Série D	10	1	—		—		—		—		10	1
Retrô	2023	Série D	0	0	11	2	0	0	—		1 (Note: Appearance(s) in Copa do Nordeste)	0	12	2
Retrô	Total		10	1	11	2	0	0	—		1	0	22	3
São José	2023	Paulista A3	—		—		—		—		16	3	16	3
São José	2024	Paulista A2	—		17	3	—		—		—		17	3
São José	Total		—		17	3	—		—		16	3	33	6
Amazonas (loan)	2024	Série B	33	6	—		2	0	—		—		35	6
Career total			63	10	74	10	3	0	0	0	24	3	164	23

== Honours ==
Guarani

- Campeonato Paulista Série A2: 2018
