= Vitinho (footballer, born September 1998) =

Brazilian footballer

Personal information
- Full name: João Victor Souza dos Santos
- Date of birth: 8 September 1998 (age 28)
- Height: 1.77 m (5 ft 10 in)
- Position: Forward

Team information
- Current team: Iraklis

Youth career
- –2019: Internacional

Senior career*
Years	Team	Apps	(Gls)
2019–2021	Vejle Boldklub	3	(0)
2020	→ MYPA (loan)	2	(1)
2020	→ HIFK (loan)	16	(4)
- * Club domestic league appearances and goals as of 03:37, 26 November 2020 (UTC)

João Victor Souza dos Santos (born 8 September 1998), commonly known as Vitinho, is a Brazilian footballer who currently plays as a forward for Vejle Boldklub.

== Career statistics ==
=== Club ===
As of 26 November 2020.

Club	Season	League			Cup		Continental		Other		Total	
Club	Season	Division	Apps	Goals	Apps	Goals	Apps	Goals	Apps	Goals	Apps	Goals
Vejle Boldklub	2019–20	NordicBet Liga	3	0	0	0	—		0	0	3	0
Vejle Boldklub	2020–21	Superliga	0	0	0	0	—		0	0	0	0
Vejle Boldklub	Total		3	0	0	0	0	0	0	0	3	0
MYPA (loan)	2020	Ykkönen	2	1	4 (Note: Appearances in the Suomen Cup)	1	—		0	0	6	2
HIFK (loan)	2020	Veikkausliiga	16	4	0	0	—		0	0	16	4
Career total			21	5	4	1	0	0	0	0	25	6
