= 2026 Gangwon FC season =

Gangwon FC
2026 season
- Manager: Chung Kyung-ho
- K League 1: 4th
- Korea Cup: Quarterfinals
- 2025–26 ACLE: Round of 16
- 2026–27 ACLE: Preliminary stage
- 2026–27 ACLT: Group stage
- Top goalscorer: League: Kim Dae-won (10); All: Kim Dae-won (10)
- Highest home attendance: 8,422 v Pohang Steelers; 5 May 2026, K League 1
- Lowest home attendance: 1,517 v Kuching City; 29 October 2026, ACLT
- Average home league attendance: 5,927
- Biggest win: 3–0 v Gwangju FC; 4 April 2026, K League 1; 3–0 v Gimcheon Sangmu; 21 April 2026, K League 1; 3–0 v FC Anyang; 6 September 2026, K League 1
- Biggest defeat: 0–3 v Bucheon FC; 1 August 2026, K League 1; 0–3 v Daejeon Hana Citizen; 23 August 2026, K League 1
Home colours	Away colours

The 2026 season is the 18th season of Gangwon FC and the club's 15th season in the K League 1. Gangwon FC is competing in K League 1, Korea Cup, 2025-26 and 2026-27 season of AFC Champions League Elite and 2026–27 AFC Champions League Two .

Gangwon FC will be scheduled to participate in 2026–27 AFC Champions League Two, but the AFC announced the expansion of the Champions League Elite from 24 to 32 teams on April 24, therefore Gangwon FC qualified for 2026–27 AFC Champions League Elite for the second consecutive year. But Gangwon FC lost in the preliminary stage of 2026–27 AFC Champions League Elite against Gamba Osaka, so Ganwon FC moved to 2026–27 AFC Champions League Two group stage.

== Coaching staff ==
- Manager: (South Korea) Chung Kyung-ho
- Assistant manager: (South Korea) Park Yong-ho
- Coach: (South Korea) Choi Hyo-jin, Song Chang-ho
- Goalkeeping coach: (South Korea) Jeon Sang-wook, Kim Min-sik
- Technical coach: (Japan) Sugasawa Taiga (from 19 May 2026)
- Physical coach: (South Korea) Jang Seok-min, Lee Seon-ho
- Data/Video Analyst : (South Korea) Lee Chang-geun, Lee Sang-hyun
- Team doctor : (South Korea) Lee Kang-hoon
- Medical trainer : (South Korea) Son Yong-kwan, Kim Yong-ha
- Interpreter : (South Korea) Kim Seung-hyun
- Equipment manager : (South Korea) Jang Hye-joon

== Current squad ==
No.	Player	Nationality	Position(s)	Date of birth (age)
Goalkeepers
1	Park Cheong-hyo	South Korea	GK	13 February 1990 (age 36)
21	Kim Jung-hoon	South Korea	GK	8 September 2004 (age 22)
31	Hong Jin-hyeok	South Korea	GK	16 March 2004 (age 22)
41	Kim Yu-seong	South Korea	GK	16 November 2005 (age 20)
51	Cho Min-kyu	South Korea	GK	30 April 2003 (age 23)
Defenders
3	Jeong Seung-bin	South Korea	CB	3 July 2006 (age 20)
5	Abdelkarim Mammar	Sweden	CB / LB	21 October 1996 (age 30)
13	Lee Ki-hyuk (VC)	South Korea	CB / CM	7 July 2000 (age 26)
23	Marko Tući	Montenegro	CB	4 December 1998 (age 27)
24	Park Ho-young	South Korea	CB	7 April 1999 (age 27)
25	Lee Hyo-bin	South Korea	LB	1 August 2007 (age 19)
27	Kim Do-hyun	South Korea	RB / RWB / RW	12 February 2000 (age 26)
29	Choi Jae-hyeok	South Korea	CB / RB	4 November 2009 (age 17)
33	Hong Chul	South Korea	LB	17 September 1990 (age 36)
37	Kwon Seok-joo	South Korea	RB	12 June 2003 (age 23)
38	Ko Eun-seok	South Korea	CB	13 June 2005 (age 21)
45	Lee Jung-hyun	South Korea	CB	8 March 2007 (age 19)
47	Shin Min-ha	South Korea	CB	15 September 2005 (age 21)
71	Kang Seong-yoon	South Korea	CB	3 March 2003 (age 23)
88	Hwang Mun-ki	South Korea	RB / RWB / CM	8 December 1996 (age 29)
99	Kang Jun-hyuk	South Korea	RB	20 October 1999 (age 27)
Midfielders
4	Seo Min-woo (VC)	South Korea	CB / DM	12 March 1998 (age 28)
6	Kim Dong-hyun	South Korea	DM	11 June 1997 (age 29)
8	Lee Seung-won	South Korea	CM	6 March 2003 (age 23)
11	Goh Young-jun	South Korea	AM / WF	9 July 2001 (age 25)
14	Kang Yun-gu	South Korea	CM	8 April 2002 (age 24)
16	Kim Tae-hwan	South Korea	CM / DM	29 May 2006 (age 20)
30	Yeo Jun-yeop	South Korea	DM / CB	4 May 2007 (age 19)
40	Won Hui-do	South Korea	DM	1 August 2005 (age 21)
42	Kim Tae-hyeok	South Korea	CM	5 January 2007 (age 19)
46	Kim Eo-jin	South Korea	CM / RB	10 April 2007 (age 19)
57	Lee Yong-jae	South Korea	CM / DM	2 October 2007 (age 19)
61	Kim Seul-gi	South Korea	DM	20 February 2007 (age 19)
66	Hwnag Eun-chong	South Korea	AM / RW	10 January 2006 (age 20)
75	Kim Yi-seok	South Korea	DM	19 June 1998 (age 28)
97	Lee You-hyeon (C)	South Korea	CM / RB	8 February 1997 (age 29)
Forwards
7	Kim Dae-won	South Korea	LW / AM	10 February 1997 (age 29)
9	Kim Gun-hee	South Korea	ST / CF	22 February 1995 (age 31)
10	Mo Jae-hyeon (VC)	South Korea	RW	24 September 1996 (age 30)
15	Jin Jun-seo	South Korea	CF	1 February 2005 (age 21)
17	Lee Eun-ho	South Korea	LW / RW	19 January 2008 (age 18)
19	Park Sang-hyeok	South Korea	ST	13 June 2002 (age 24)
22	Yoo Byung-heon	South Korea	ST / CF	1 February 2006 (age 20)
26	Cho Won-woo	South Korea	LW / WF	12 May 2005 (age 21)
39	Lee Ji-ho	South Korea	LW / ST	16 April 2002 (age 24)
70	Jesse Sekidika	Nigeria	LW / RW	14 July 1996 (age 30)
74	Choi Ji-nam	South Korea	LW	1 February 2007 (age 19)
77	Abdallah Hleihel	Israel	CF / ST	11 January 2001 (age 25)
96	Choe Byeong-chan	South Korea	RW / RWB / RB	4 April 1996 (age 30)
Out on loan
20	Jo Hyun-tae	South Korea	CB	27 October 2004 (age 22)
34	Song Jun-seok	South Korea	LB	6 February 2001 (age 25)
	Mario Ćuže	Croatia	LW	24 April 1999 (age 27)
	Lee Sang-heon	South Korea	LW / ST / AM	26 February 1998 (age 28)
	Kim Hyeong-jin	South Korea	RW	19 November 2006 (age 19)
	Kim Kang-kook	South Korea	CM	7 January 1997 (age 29)

Last updated: 6 October 2026.
Source: Gangwon FC

== Transfers ==
=== Out ===
Date from	Position	Nationality	Player	To	Notes	Ref.
Pre-season
22 December 2025	DF	(South Korea)	Choi Han-sol	(South Korea) Jeonnam Dragons	End of contract	
31 December 2025	MF	(South Korea)	Goo Bon-cheul	(South Korea) Seongnam FC	End of loan	
31 December 2025	GK	(South Korea)	Lee Gwang-yeon	(South Korea) Seongnam FC	End of contract	
31 December 2025	DF	(South Korea)	Yun Il-lok	(South Korea) Gyeongnam FC	End of contract	
31 December 2025	DF	(South Korea)	Choi Jeong-hoon	(South Korea) Yeoju FC	End of contract	
31 December 2025	FW	(South Korea)	Kim Sin-jin	(South Korea) Jeju SK FC	End of contract	
31 December 2025	FW	(South Korea)	Sung Gi-wan	Free agent	End of contract	
31 December 2025	DF	(South Korea)	Park Su-hwan	Free agent	End of contract	
31 December 2025	FW	(South Korea)	Jeong In-jeung	(South Korea) Yeoju FC	End of contract	
31 December 2025	DF	(Brazil)	Bruno Oliveira	Free agent	End of contract	
2 January 2026	MF	(South Korea)	Kim Dae-woo	(South Korea) Daegu FC	Mutual consent	
2 January 2026	MF	(South Korea)	Lee Dong-jin	(South Korea) Chungbuk Cheongju FC	Mutual consent	
8 January 2026	MF	(South Korea)	Kim Min-jun	(South Korea) Bucheon FC 1995	Mutual consent	
12 January 2026	FW	(Brazil)	Vitor Gabriel	(South Korea) Bucheon FC 1995	Mutual consent	
4 February 2026	FW	(South Korea)	Cho Jin-hyuk	(South Korea) Gyeongnam FC	Mutual consent	
Mid-season

- Note: Players will join other clubs after being released or terminated from their contract. Only the following clubs are mentioned when that club signed the player in the same transfer window.

=== Loan out ===
Date from	Position	Nationality	Player	To	Date until	Ref.
Pre-season
15 January 2026	FW	(South Korea)	Kim Hyeong-jin	(South Korea) Dangjin Citizen FC	31 December 2026	
30 January 2026	MF	(South Korea)	Kim Kang-kook	(South Korea) Jincheon HR FC	October 2027	
Mid-season
22 June 2026	DF	(South Korea)	Jo Hyun-tae	(South Korea) Daegu FC	31 December 2026	
3 August 2026	DF	(South Korea)	Song Jun-seok	(South Korea) Gimcheon Sangmu	February 2028	(Note: Song Jun-seok's loan for military duty was announced on 2 April 2026 and his loan will commence on 3 August 2025.)

=== In ===
Date from	Position	Nationality	Player	From	Notes	Ref.
Pre-season
3 January 2026	MF	(South Korea)	Won Hui-do	(South Korea) Pocheon Citizen	Loan return	
3 January 2026	GK	(South Korea)	Kim Jung-hoon	(South Korea) Suwon Samsung Bluewings	Free agent	
4 January 2026	MF	(South Korea)	Lee Yong-jae	(South Korea) Gangwon FC U-18	Undisclosed	(Note: First professional contract)
4 January 2026	MF	(South Korea)	Kim Eo-jin	(South Korea) Yongin Football Center U-18	Undisclosed	
4 January 2026	DF	(South Korea)	Lee Jung-hyun	(South Korea) Cheongju Daesung High School	Undisclosed	
4 January 2026	MF	(South Korea)	Yeo Jun-yeop	(South Korea) Jinwee High School	Undisclosed	
4 January 2026	DF	(South Korea)	Lee Hyo-bin	(South Korea) Suwon High School	Undisclosed	
4 January 2026	FW	(South Korea)	Choi Ji-nam	(South Korea) Gangneung Munseong High School	Undisclosed	
4 January 2026	FW	(South Korea)	Cho Won-woo	(South Korea) Cheju Tourism College	Undisclosed	
23 January 2026	GK	(Israel)	Abdallah Hleihel	(Georgia (country)) FC Dila Gori	Undisclosed	
24 January 2026	FW	(South Korea)	Lee Eun-ho	(United States) FC Dallas Academy	Undisclosed	
26 March 2026	MF	(South Korea)	Kim Tae-hyeok	(South Korea) Gwangju FC U-18	Undisclosed	
26 March 2026	DF	(South Korea)	Ko Eun-seok	(South Korea) Hongik University	Undisclosed	
Mid-season
9 April 2026	DF	(South Korea)	Choi Jae-hyeok	(South Korea) Gangwon FC U-18	Academy call-up	
16 June 2026	FW	(Nigeria)	Jesse Sekidika	(Azerbaijan) Sabah FK	Free agent	
27 June 2026	DF	(Sweden)	Abdelkarim Mammar	(Algeria) MC Oran	Free agent	
4 August 2026	DF	(South Korea)	Kwon Seok-joo	(South Korea) Seoul Jungnang	End of military duty	
6 August 2026	MF	(South Korea)	Kim Seul-gi	(South Korea) Yonsei University	Undisclosed	
19 August 2026	DF	(South Korea)	Kang Seong-yoon	(South Korea) Dangjin Citizen FC	Undisclosed	
6 October 2026	DF	(South Korea)	Hwang Mun-ki	(South Korea) Pyeongchang United	Loan return	
7 October 2026	MF	(South Korea)	Kim Yi-seok	(South Korea) Gimcheon Sangmu	Loan return	

=== Loan in ===
Date from	Position	Nationality	Player	From	Date until	Ref.
Pre-season
8 January 2026	MF	(South Korea)	Goh Young-jun	(Poland) Górnik Zabrze	31 December 2026	
Mid-season

== Pre-season and friendlies ==
Gangwon FC announced that their preseason training will be conducted in Antalya, Turkey, from January 5 to February 3.

Win Draw Loss Cancel Fixtures

11 January 2026 Friendly	FC Dinamo București (Romania)	3–2	(South Korea) Gangwon FC	Antalya, Turkey
14:00 UTC+3	Cîrjan 10'; Mazilu 24'; Karamoko 64'		Kim Gun-hee 70' (pen.), 77'

15 January 2026 Friendly	Arka Gdynia (Poland)	4–0	(South Korea) Gangwon FC	Antalya, Turkey
15:00 UTC+3	Kocyła 46', 68'; Kerk 48'; Szysz 82'

18 January 2026 Friendly	FK Radnički 1923 (Serbia)	0–1	(South Korea) Gangwon FC	Antalya, Turkey
14:30 UTC+3			Park Sang-hyeok 54'

22 January 2026 Friendly	FK Partizan (Serbia)	(Note: Match was cancelled due to bad weather conditions.)	(South Korea) Gangwon FC	Antalya, Turkey
17:00 UTC+3

29 January 2026 Friendly	ŠK Slovan Bratislava (Slovakia)	2–2	(South Korea) Gangwon FC	Antalya, Turkey
15:00 UTC+3	Kukharevych 12'; Gajdoš 33'		Kim Dae-won 8'; Kang Yun-gu 56'

1 February 2026 Friendly	FC CSKA 1948 Sofia (Bulgaria)	3–0	(South Korea) Gangwon FC	Antalya, Turkey
11:00 UTC+3	Bernardo Couto 49'; Iliev 69'; Adama Traoré 86'

== Competitions ==
=== Overall record ===
Competition	First match	Last match	Starting round	Final position	Record							
Competition	First match	Last match	Starting round	Final position	Pld	W	D	L	GF	GA	GD	Win %
K League 1	28 February 2026	6 December 2026	Matchday 1		35	12	15	8	44	34	+10	34.29
2026–27 Korea Cup	19 August 2026 (Note: The tournament will continue into the 2027 season.)		Round of 16	Quarterfinal	1	0	1	0	0	0	+0	0.00
2025–26 AFC Champions League Elite	11 February 2026	10 March 2026	League stage	Round of 16	4	0	3	1	0	1	−1	0.00
2026–27 AFC Champions League Elite	11 August 2026		Preliminary stage	Preliminary stage	1	0	0	1	0	1	−1	0.00
2026–27 AFC Champions League Two	17 September 2026	3 December 2026	Group stage		4	1	1	2	2	4	−2	25.00
Total					45	13	20	12	46	40	+6	28.89

Last updated: 8 November 2026
Source: Competitions

=== K League 1 ===
==== League table ====
Pos	Team	Pld	W	D	L	GF	GA	GD	Pts	Qualification or relegation (Note: Teams played each other three times (33 matches), before the league was split into two groups, the top six and the bottom six.)
2	Ulsan HD	35	17	6	12	56	49	+7	57	Qualification for Champions League Elite league stage
3	Daejeon Hana Citizen	35	14	11	10	55	41	+14	53	Qualification for Champions League Elite league stage
4	Gangwon FC	35	12	15	8	44	34	+10	51	Qualification for Champions League Elite play-off round
5	Jeonbuk Hyundai Motors	35	12	13	10	45	36	+9	49	
6	Incheon United	35	13	10	12	44	37	+7	49	

Updated to match(es) played on 8 November 2026. Source: Soccerway K League
Rules for classification: 1) Points; 2) Goals scored; 3) Goal difference; 4) Wins; 5) Head-to-head points

==== Results summary ====
Overall								Home						Away					
Pld	W	D	L	GF	GA	GD	Pts	W	D	L	GF	GA	GD	W	D	L	GF	GA	GD
35	12	15	8	44	34	+10	51	6	9	3	23	16	+7	6	6	5	21	18	+3

Last updated: 8 November 2026.
Source: Soccerway

==== Results by round ====
Round	1	2	3	4	5	6	7	8	9	10	11	12	13	14	15	16	17	18	19	20	21	22	23	24	25	26	27	28	29	30	31	32	33	34	35	36	37	38
Ground	A	H	A	H	A	H	A	H	A	H	A	H	A	H	H	A	A	H	A	A	H	A	A	H	H	A	H	A	H	H	H	H	A	A	H	H	A	H
Result	L	D	D	D	L	W	W	D	W	L	W	D	D	W	W	W	D	W	D	L	L	W	L	D	D	W	D	D	L	D	W	D	D	L	W			
Position	12	11	10	10	11	6	4	4	3	6	4	4	6	5	4	3	3	2	2	3	4	3	4	4	5	4	5	5	5	5	3	4	5	6	4			
Points	0	1	2	3	3	6	9	10	13	13	16	17	18	21	24	27	28	31	32	32	32	35	35	36	37	40	41	42	42	43	46	47	48	48	51			

Updated to match(es) played on 8 November 2026. Source: K League Data Portal
A = Away; H = Home; W = Win; D = Draw; L = Loss

==== Matches ====
As usual, the league season will be played with 38 matches split in two stages. After 33 league matches between the 12 participating teams, the teams are split into the Final Round (Top 6 teams, which aims to won an AFC Champions spot) and Relegation Round (Bottom 6 teams, that aims to survive relegation).On 13 January 2026, K League announced schedule of the 2026 season except final round. On 26 October 2026, K League announced schedule of the final round of 2026 season.

All times are local, KST (UTC+9).

28 February 2026 1	Ulsan HD	3-1	Gangwon FC	Ulsan
14:00	Yago Cariello 19', 45+3'; Lee Hui-gyun 86'		Hleihel 90+4'	Stadium: Ulsan Munsu Football Stadium; Attendance: 11,036; Referee: Park Byung-jin

15 March 2026 3	Gangwon FC	1-1	FC Anyang	Gangneung
16:30	Park Sang-hyeok 6'		Choi Geon-ju 18'; Kim Jeong-hyun (red card) 63'	Stadium: Gangneung Stadium; Attendance: 6,087; Referee: Kim Jong-hyeok

18 March 2026 4	Bucheon FC 1995	0-0	Gangwon FC	Bucheon
19:30				Stadium: Bucheon Stadium; Attendance: 3,132; Referee: Choi Cheol-jun

22 March 2026 5	Gangwon FC	1-1	Jeju SK FC	Gangneung
16:30	Hleihel 90+4'		Jo In-jung 15'	Stadium: Gangneung Stadium; Attendance: 5,377; Referee: Kim Dae-yong

28 March 2026 2	Pohang Steelers	1-0	Gangwon FC	Pohang
15:00	Lee Ho-jae 71'			Stadium: Pohang Steel Yard; Attendance: 7,385; Referee: Kim Jong-hyeok
Note: Fixture was originally scheduled for March 7th 14:00 kick-off, but was moved to March 28th 15:00 kick-off for ACLE Rond of 16 match scheduling.

4 April 2026 6	Gangwon FC	3-0	Gwangju FC	Gangneung
16:30	Tući 10'; Mo Jae-hyeon 13'; Lee You-hyeon 54'			Stadium: Gangneung Stadium; Attendance: 4,448; Referee: Sin Yong-jun

12 April 2026 7	Daejeon Hana Citizen	0-2	Gangwon FC	Daejeon
14:00			Kim Dae-won 34'; Kim Moon-hwan 90+2' (o.g.)	Stadium: Daejeon World Cup Stadium; Attendance: 7,082; Referee: Kim Dae-yong

18 April 2026 8	Gangwon FC	1-1	Jeonbuk Hyundai Motors	Gangneung
14:00	Mo Jae-hyeon 56'		Tiago Orobó 33'	Stadium: Gangneung Stadium; Attendance: 7,725; Referee: Song Min-seok

21 April 2026 9	Gimcheon Sangmu	0-3	Gangwon FC	Gimcheon
19:30			Kim Dae-won 36', 45+4' (pen.); Hleihel 83'	Stadium: Gimcheon Stadium; Attendance: 1,125; Referee: Sin Yong-jun

25 April 2026 10	Gangwon FC	1-2	FC Seoul	Gangneung
14:00	Song Jun-seok (red card) 45+3'; Hleihel 90+6'		Babec 42'; Son Jeong-beom (red card) 45+3'; Lee Seung-mo 81'	Stadium: Gangneung Stadium; Attendance: 8,259; Referee: Lee Dong-jun

2 May 2026 11	Incheon United	0-1	Gangwon FC	Incheon
16:30			Kim Dae-won 44'	Stadium: Incheon Football Stadium; Attendance: 11,404; Referee: Ko Hyung-jin

5 May 2026 12	Gangwon FC	1-1	Pohang Steelers	Gangneung
16:30	Hleihel 69'		Cho Sang-hyeok 81'	Stadium: Gangneung Stadium; Attendance: 8,422; Referee: Kim Woo-seong

9 May 2026 13	Gwangju FC	0-0	Gangwon FC	Gwangju
16:30				Stadium: Gwangju World Cup Stadium; Attendance: 6,013; Referee: Seol Tae-hwan

12 May 2026 14	Gangwon FC	2-0	Daejeon Hana Citizen	Gangneung
19:30	Hleihel 87'; Kim Dae-won 88'			Stadium: Gangneung Stadium; Attendance: 4,618; Referee: Lee Dong-jun

17 May 2026 15	Gangwon FC	2-0	Ulsan HD	Gangneung
19:00	Choe Byeong-chan 21'; Tući 45'		Jeong Jae-sang (yellow card) 78' (yellow-red card) 90+2'	Stadium: Gangneung Stadium; Attendance: 8,327; Referee: Ko Hyung-jin

4 July 2026 16	Jeonbuk Hyundai Motors	1-2	Gangwon FC	Jeonju
19:30	Lee Seung-woo 74'		Song Jun-seok 25'; Lee You-hyeon 53'	Stadium: Jeonju World Cup Stadium; Attendance: 15,551; Referee: Kim Jong-hyeok

12 July 2026 17	FC Seoul	0-0	Gangwon FC	Seoul
19:30				Stadium: Seoul World Cup Stadium; Attendance: 17,872; Referee: Seol Tae-hwan

18 July 2026 18	Gangwon FC	2-0	Gimcheon Sangmu	Gangneung
19:30	Kim Dae-won 22', 42'		Lee Soo-bin (red card) 19'	Stadium: Gangneung Stadium; Attendance: 5,810; Referee: Choi Hyeon-jae

21 July 2026 19	Jeju SK FC	1-1	Gangwon FC	Seogwipo
19:30	Kim Sin-jin 21'		Goh Young-jun 27'	Stadium: Jeju World Cup Stadium; Attendance: 3,107; Referee: Kim Woo-seong

26 July 2026 20	FC Anyang	2-1	Gangwon FC	Anyang
19:30	Choi Geon-ju 3'; Herculano 36'		Hleihel 90+6'	Stadium: Anyang Sports Complex; Attendance: 5,461; Referee: Kim Jong-hyeok

1 August 2026 21	Gangwon FC	0-3	Bucheon FC 1995	Gangneung
19:30			Jefferson Galego 19'; Sung Ye-geon 60'; Vitor Gabriel 69'	Stadium: Gangneung Stadium; Attendance: 6,311; Referee: Ko Hyung-jin

16 August 2026 23	Ulsan HD	2-3	Gangwon FC	Ulsan
19:30	Kim Young-gwon 15'; Jung Seung-hyun 55'		Sekidika 34'; Kim Young-gwon 43' (o.g.); Kim Dong-hyun 82'	Stadium: Ulsan Munsu Football Stadium; Attendance: 9,350; Referee: Kim Jong-hyeok

23 August 2026 24	Daejeon Hana Citizen	3-0	Gangwon FC	Daejeon
19:30	Ludwigson 47'; Joo Min-kyu 56'; Jeong Jae-hee 66'		Seo Min-woo (red card) 42'	Stadium: Daejeon World Cup Stadium; Attendance: 4,747; Referee: Park Byung-jin

26 August 2026 25	Gangwon FC	2-2	Gwangju FC	Gangneung
19:30	Hong Chul (red card) 68'; Tući 88'; Kim Dong-hyun 89'		Moon Min-seo 5', 45' (pen.)	Stadium: Gangneung Stadium; Attendance: 3,836; Referee: Kim Woo-seong

30 August 2026 26	Gangwon FC	0-0	Pohang Steelers	Gangneung
19:30				Stadium: Gangneung Stadium; Attendance: 5,172; Referee: Ko Hyung-jin
Note: Originally, the match will be held Pohang Steel Yard, Pohang Steelers' home stadium, but K League decided Pohang's home match will be transferred to the away team due to stadium's safety condition issue.

6 September 2026 27	FC Anyang	0-3	Gangwon FC	Anyang
19:00			Mammar 20'; Kim Gun-hee 55'; Mo Jae-hyeon 59'	Stadium: Anyang Sports Complex; Attendance: 6,044; Referee: Park Byung-jin

9 September 2026 28	Gangwon FC	1-1	Jeonbuk Hyundai Motors	Gangneung
19:30	Hleihel 59'		Italo 15'	Stadium: Gangneung Stadium; Attendance: 5,066; Referee: Choi Cheol-jun

13 September 2026 29	Gimcheon Sangmu	2-2	Gangwon FC	Gimcheon
16:30	Kim Ju-chan 4'; Park Se-jin 43'		Park Sang-hyeok 74'; Kim Dae-won 90+4' (pen.)	Stadium: Gimcheon Stadium; Attendance: 1,659; Referee: Song Min-seok

20 September 2026 30	Gangwon FC	0-1	Jeju SK FC	Gangneung
16:30			Italo 36'	Stadium: Gangneung Stadium; Attendance: 5,790; Referee: Kim Dae-yong

27 September 2026 22	Gangwon FC	0-0	Incheon United	Gangneung
19:30				Stadium: Gangneung Stadium; Attendance: 5,274; Referee: Park Byung-jin
Note: Fixture was originally scheduled for August 8th 19:30 kick-off, but was moved to September 27th 19:00 kick-off for ACLE Preliminary round match scheduling.

9 October 2026 31	Gangwon FC	2-0	Bucheon FC 1995	Gangneung
16:30	Kim Dae-won 72' (pen.); Kim Gun-hee 80'			Stadium: Gangneung Stadium; Attendance: 6,398; Referee: Sin Yong-jun

18 October 2026 32	Gangwon FC	1-1	Incheon United	Gangneung
16:30	Kim Dae-won 42'		Mugoša 23' (pen.)	Stadium: Gangneung Stadium; Attendance: 5,558; Referee: Seol Tae-hwan

24 October 2026 33	FC Seoul	1-1	Gangwon FC	Seoul
14:00	Moon Seon-min 58'		Kang Jun-hyuk 65'	Stadium: Seoul World Cup Stadium; Attendance: 30,022; Referee: Lee Dong-jun

1 November 2026 34	Ulsan HD	2-1	Gangwon FC	Ulsan
14:00	Erick Farias 70', 85'		Hwang Byeong-geun 41' (o.g.)	Stadium: Ulsan Munsu Football Stadium; Attendance: 7,038; Referee: Kim Yong-woo

8 November 2026 35	Gangwon FC	3-2	Jeonbuk Hyundai Motors	Gangneung
16:30	Shin Min-ha 13'; Mo Jae-hyeon 39'; Park Sang-hyeok 90+5'		Compagno 9' (pen.); Lee Dong-jun 86'	Stadium: Gangneung Stadium; Attendance: 4,206; Referee: Choi Hyeon-jae

21 Nobermver 2026 36	Gangwon FC	-	Daejeon Hana Citizen	Gangneung
16:30				Stadium: Gangneung Stadium

29 November 2026 37	Incheon United	-	Gangwon FC	Incheon
16:30				Stadium: Incheon Football Stadium

6 December 2026 38	Gangwon FC	-	FC Seoul	Gangneung
14:00				Stadium: Gangneung Stadium

=== 2026–27 Korea Cup ===
Traditionally, the Korea Cup kicked off in late February or early March and concluded with the final in December. However, starting from the 2026 edition, Rounds 1 will be start in July, while the quarterfinals through the final will take place in May and June 2027. The draw was held on 21 May 2026, and Gangwon FC will enter the Korea Cup in the fourth round (Round of 16) as one of the K League 1 teams participating in AFC competitions.

19 August 2026 Round of 16	Gangwon FC	0–0 (a.e.t.) (4–3 p)	Seongnam FC	Gangneung
19:30 UTC+9				Stadium: Gangneung Stadium; Attendance: 2,981; Referee: Park Jin-ho
	Penalties
	Yoo Byung-heon (penalty scored); Lee Yong-jae (penalty missed); Choi Ji-nam (penalty scored); Lee Hyo-bin (penalty missed); Lee Eun-ho (penalty scored); Park Ho-young (penalty scored)		(penalty scored) Jung Seung-yong; (penalty scored) Venício; (penalty missed) Lee Sang-min; (penalty missed) You Ju-an; (penalty scored) Villero; (penalty missed) Lee Jun-sang
Note: The tournament will continue into the 2027 season from Quarterfinal.

=== 2025–26 AFC Champions League Elite ===
==== League stage ====
===== League stage (East Region) table =====
Pos	Team	Pld	W	D	L	GF	GA	GD	Pts	Qualification
6	(Malaysia) Johor Darul Ta'zim	8	3	2	3	8	7	+1	11	Advance to round of 16
7	(South Korea) FC Seoul	8	2	4	2	10	9	+1	10	Advance to round of 16
8	(South Korea) Gangwon FC	8	2	3	3	9	11	−2	9	Advance to round of 16
9	(South Korea) Ulsan HD	8	2	3	3	6	8	−2	9	
10	(China) Chengdu Rongcheng	8	1	3	4	7	11	−4	6	

Source: AFC
Rules for classification: 1) points; 2) goal difference; 3) number of goals scored; 4) number of matches won; 5) penalty shoot-out if only two teams remain tied and played each other on the final matchday 6) fair play ranking; 7) drawing of lots

===== Results summary (ACLE) =====
Overall								Home						Away					
Pld	W	D	L	GF	GA	GD	Pts	W	D	L	GF	GA	GD	W	D	L	GF	GA	GD
8	2	3	3	9	11	−2	9	2	1	1	7	7	0	0	2	2	2	4	−2

Last updated: 18 February 2026.
Source: ACLE

===== Results by round (ACLE) =====
Round	1	2	3	4	5	6	7	8
Ground	H	A	H	A	H	A	H	A
Result	W	L	W	L	L	D	D	D
Position	3	5	3	5	9	9	8	8
Points	3	3	6	6	6	7	8	9

Updated to match(es) played on 18 February 2026. Source: ACLE
A = Away; H = Home; W = Win; D = Draw; L = Loss; P = Postponed

===== Matches (ACLE) =====
The tournament continue from the 2025 season.

11 February 2026 7	Gangwon FC (South Korea)	0-0	(China) Shanghai Port	Chuncheon, South Korea
19:00 UTC+9		Report		Stadium: Chuncheon Songam Sports Town; Attendance: 2,527; Referee: Ahmad Al-Ali (Kuwait)

18 February 2026 8	Melbourne City (Australia)	0-0	(South Korea) Gangwon FC	Melbourne, Australia
21:00 UTC+11		Report		Stadium: Melbourne Rectangular Stadium; Attendance: 936; Referee: Mohammed Al-Shammari (Qatar)

==== Knockout stage ====
===== Round of 16 =====
3 March 2026 1st leg	Gangwon FC (South Korea)	0-0	(Japan) Machida Zelvia	Chuncheon, South Korea
19:00 UTC+9		Report		Stadium: Chuncheon Songam Sports Town; Attendance: 2,675; Referee: Ahmad A'Qashah (Singapore)

10 March 2026 2nd leg	Machida Zelvia (Japan)	1-0	(South Korea) Gangwon FC	Machida, Japan
19:00 UTC+9	Nakamura 25'	Report		Stadium: Machida City Nozuta Park Stadium; Attendance: 4,345; Referee: Rustam Lutfullin (Uzbekistan)

=== 2026–27 AFC Champions League Elite ===
==== Preliminary round ====
11 August 2026 Preliminary round	Gangwon FC (South Korea)	0–1 (a.e.t.)	(Japan) Gamba Osaka	Gangneung, South Korea
19:30 UTC+9		Report	Nawata 103'	Stadium: Gangneung Stadium; Attendance: 5,404; Referee: Salman Falahi (Qatar)
Note: Gangwon FC entered the group stage of the 2026–27 AFC Champions League Two.

=== 2026–27 AFC Champions League Two ===
==== Group stage ====
===== Group stage (Group H) table =====
Pos	Team	Pld	W	D	L	GF	GA	GD	Pts	Qualification
1	(Cambodia) Phnom Penh Crown	4	3	0	1	7	4	+3	9	Advance to round of 16
2	(Hong Kong) Kitchee	4	1	2	1	3	4	−1	5	Advance to round of 16
3	(Malaysia) Kuching City	4	1	1	2	4	4	0	4	
4	(South Korea) Gangwon FC	4	1	1	2	2	4	−2	4	

Updated to match(es) played on 5 November 2026. Source: ACL2
Rules for classification: Tiebreakers

===== Results summary (ACLT) =====
Overall								Home						Away					
Pld	W	D	L	GF	GA	GD	Pts	W	D	L	GF	GA	GD	W	D	L	GF	GA	GD
4	1	1	2	2	4	−2	4	1	0	1	2	2	0	0	1	1	0	2	−2

Last updated: 5 November 2026.
Source: ACLT

===== Results by round (ACLT) =====
Round	1	2	3	4	5	6
Ground	A	H	H	A	H	A
Result	D	L	W	L		
Position	2	4	2	4		
Points	1	1	4	4		

Updated to match(es) played on 17 September 2026. Source: ACLT
A = Away; H = Home; W = Win; D = Draw; L = Loss; P = Postponed

===== Matches (ACLT) =====
17 September 2026 Matchday 1	Kitchee (Hong Kong)	0-0	(South Korea) Gangwon FC	Hong Kong
20:15 UTC+8	Mingazow (yellow card) 54' (yellow-red card) 70'	Report		Stadium: Mong Kok Stadium; Attendance: 2,899; Referee: Ahmad Yacoub Ibrahim (Jordan)

15 October 2026 Matchday 2	Gangwon FC (South Korea)	1-2	(Cambodia) Phnom Penh Crown	Gangneung, South Korea
19:00 UTC+9	Hleihel 61' (pen.)	Report	Mijland 44'; Dyer 78' (pen.)	Stadium: Gangneung HIGH1 ARENA; Attendance: 2,207; Referee: Zaid Thamer Mohammed (Iraq)

29 October 2026 Matchday 3	Gangwon FC (South Korea)	1-0	(Malaysia) Kuching City	Gangneung, South Korea
19:00 UTC+9	Choe Byeong-chan 28'	Report		Stadium: Gangneung HIGH1 ARENA; Attendance: 1,517; Referee: Du Jianxin (China)

5 November 2026 Matchday 4	Kuching City (Malaysia)	2-0	(South Korea) Gangwon FC	Johor Bahru, Malaysia
20:15 UTC+8	Safawi 13', 20'	Report		Stadium: Tan Sri Dato' Haji Hassan Yunos Stadium; Attendance: 3,216; Referee: Mahmoud Al-Sawalmeh (Jordan)

26 November 2026 Matchday 5	Gangwon FC (South Korea)	-	(Hong Kong) Kitchee	Gangneung, South Korea
19:00 UTC+9				Stadium: Gangneung HIGH1 ARENA

3 December 2026 Matchday 6	Phnom Penh Crown (Cambodia)	-	(South Korea) Gangwon FC	Phnom Penh, Cambodia
19:15 UTC+7				Stadium: Morodok Techo National Stadium

== Statistics ==
=== Appearances and goals ===
Last updated on 8 November 2026.

No.	Pos	Nat	Player	Total		K League 1		2026–27 Korea Cup		2025-26 ACLE		2026-27 ACLE		2026-27 ACLT	
No.	Pos	Nat	Player	Apps	Goals	Apps	Goals	Apps	Goals	Apps	Goals	Apps	Goals	Apps	Goals
Goalkeepers
1	GK	(South Korea) KOR	Park Cheong-hyo	41	0	35	0	0	0	4	0	1	0	1	0
21	GK	(South Korea) KOR	Kim Jung-hoon	0	0	0	0	0	0	0	0	0	0	0	0
31	GK	(South Korea) KOR	Hong Jin-hyeok	0	0	0	0	0	0	0	0	0	0	0	0
41	GK	(South Korea) KOR	Kim Yu-seong	3	0	0	0	0	0	0	0	0	0	3	0
51	GK	(South Korea) KOR	Cho Min-kyu	1	0	0	0	1	0	0	0	0	0	0	0
Defenders
3	DF	(South Korea) KOR	Jeong Seung-bin	5	0	0+3	0	0	0	0	0	0	0	0+2	0
5	DF	(Sweden) SWE	Abdelkarim Mammar	8	1	6	1	1	0	0	0	0	0	1	0
13	DF	(South Korea) KOR	Lee Ki-hyuk	32	0	26+1	0	0	0	4	0	1	0	0	0
23	DF	(Montenegro) MNE	Marko Tući	30	3	24+1	3	0	0	3	0	1	0	1	0
24	DF	(South Korea) KOR	Park Ho-young	21	0	7+9	0	1	0	2	0	0+1	0	0+1	0
25	DF	(South Korea) KOR	Lee Hyo-bin	5	0	0+1	0	0+1	0	0+1	0	0	0	1+1	0
27	DF	(South Korea) KOR	Kim Do-hyun	30	0	12+10	0	1	0	0+4	0	0+1	0	2	0
29	DF	(South Korea) KOR	Choi Jae-hyeok	1	0	0	0	0	0	0	0	0	0	1	0
33	DF	(South Korea) KOR	Hong Chul	14	0	4+7	0	0	0	0	0	1	0	2	0
37	DF	(South Korea) KOR	Kwon Seok-joo	0	0	0	0	0	0	0	0	0	0	0	0
38	DF	(South Korea) KOR	Ko Eun-seok	4	0	0+1	0	0	0	0	0	0	0	3	0
45	DF	(South Korea) KOR	Lee Jung-hyun	0	0	0	0	0	0	0	0	0	0	0	0
47	DF	(South Korea) KOR	Shin Min-ha	29	1	15+8	1	1	0	2+1	0	0+1	0	1	0
71	DF	(South Korea) KOR	Kang Seong-yoon	6	0	1+2	0	0	0	0	0	0	0	3	0
88	DF	(South Korea) KOR	Hwang Mun-ki	3	0	3	0	0	0	0	0	0	0	0	0
99	DF	(South Korea) KOR	Kang Jun-hyuk	37	1	29+2	1	0	0	4	0	1	0	1	0
Midfielders
4	MF	(South Korea) KOR	Seo Min-woo	39	0	29+4	0	0	0	4	0	1	0	1	0
6	MF	(South Korea) KOR	Kim Dong-hyun	23	2	9+11	2	1	0	0	0	0	0	1+1	0
8	MF	(South Korea) KOR	Lee Seung-won	22	0	3+13	0	1	0	3+1	0	0	0	1	0
11	MF	(South Korea) KOR	Goh Young-jun	36	1	28+3	1	0	0	4	0	1	0	0	0
14	MF	(South Korea) KOR	Kang Yun-gu	17	0	3+6	0	1	0	1+3	0	0	0	3	0
16	MF	(South Korea) KOR	Kim Tae-hwan	2	0	0	0	0	0	0	0	0	0	1+1	0
30	MF	(South Korea) KOR	Yeo Jun-yeop	0	0	0	0	0	0	0	0	0	0	0	0
40	MF	(South Korea) KOR	Won Hui-do	0	0	0	0	0	0	0	0	0	0	0	0
42	MF	(South Korea) KOR	Kim Tae-hyeok	0	0	0	0	0	0	0	0	0	0	0	0
46	MF	(South Korea) KOR	Kim Eo-jin	0	0	0	0	0	0	0	0	0	0	0	0
57	MF	(South Korea) KOR	Lee Yong-jae	5	0	0+1	0	0+1	0	0	0	0	0	3	0
61	MF	(South Korea) KOR	Kim Seul-gi	0	0	0	0	0	0	0	0	0	0	0	0
66	MF	(South Korea) KOR	Hwnag Eun-chong	1	0	0	0	0	0	0	0	0	0	0+1	0
75	MF	(South Korea) KOR	Kim Yi-seok	2	0	0	0	0	0	0	0	0	0	2	0
97	MF	(South Korea) KOR	Lee You-hyeon	36	2	29+3	2	0	0	0+2	0	1	0	1	0
Forwards
7	FW	(South Korea) KOR	Kim Dae-won	39	10	33	10	0	0	2+2	0	1	0	1	0
9	FW	(South Korea) KOR	Kim Gun-hee	30	2	7+19	2	1	0	0	0	0+1	0	2	0
10	FW	(South Korea) KOR	Mo Jae-hyeon	33	4	27+2	4	0	0	3+1	0	0	0	0	0
15	FW	(South Korea) KOR	Jin Jun-seo	0	0	0	0	0	0	0	0	0	0	0	0
17	FW	(South Korea) KOR	Lee Eun-ho	6	0	0+2	0	0+1	0	0	0	0	0	0+3	0
19	FW	(South Korea) KOR	Park Sang-hyeok	31	3	7+16	3	0+1	0	4	0	0	0	1+2	0
22	FW	(South Korea) KOR	Yoo Byung-heon	4	0	0	0	0+1	0	0	0	0	0	1+2	0
26	FW	(South Korea) KOR	Cho Won-woo	7	0	2+1	0	1	0	0	0	0	0	3	0
39	FW	(South Korea) KOR	Lee Ji-ho	6	0	0+2	0	1	0	0+2	0	0+1	0	0	0
70	FW	(Nigeria) NGR	Jesse Sekidika	14	1	5+7	1	0	0	0	0	1	0	0+1	0
74	FW	(South Korea) KOR	Choi Ji-nam	3	0	0	0	0+1	0	0	0	0	0	1+1	0
77	FW	(Israel) ISR	Abdallah Hleihel	36	9	2+27	8	0	0	0+3	0	0+1	0	1+2	1
96	FW	(South Korea) KOR	Choe Byeong-chan	29	2	23+4	1	0	0	0	0	1	0	1	1
Player(s) who left on loan during this season
20	DF	(South Korea) KOR	Jo Hyun-tae	0	0	0	0	0	0	0	0	0	0	0	0
34	DF	(South Korea) KOR	Song Jun-seok	20	1	16	1	0	0	4	0	0	0	0	0
Player(s) who left permanently during this season

=== Goalscorers ===
Italic marked players have left during the season.

Rank	Pos.	No.	Player	K League 1	2026–27 Korea Cup	2025–26 ACLE	2026–27 ACLE	2026–27 ACLT	Total
1	FW	7	(South Korea) Kim Dae-won	10	0	0	0	0	10
2	FW	77	(Israel) Abdallah Hleihel	8	0	0	0	1	9
3	FW	10	(South Korea) Mo Jae-hyeon	4	0	0	0	0	4
4	FW	19	(South Korea) Park Sang-hyeok	3	0	0	0	0	3
4	DF	23	(Montenegro) Marko Tući	3	0	0	0	0	3
6	MF	6	(South Korea) Kim Dong-hyun	2	0	0	0	0	2
6	FW	9	(South Korea) Kim Gun-hee	2	0	0	0	0	2
6	MF	97	(South Korea) Lee You-hyeon	2	0	0	0	0	2
6	FW	96	(South Korea) Choe Byeong-chan	1	0	0	0	1	2
10	DF	5	(Sweden) Abdelkarim Mammar	1	0	0	0	0	1
10	MF	11	(South Korea) Goh Young-jun	1	0	0	0	0	1
10	DF	34	(South Korea) Song Jun-seok	1	0	0	0	0	1
10	DF	47	(South Korea) Shin Min-ha	1	0	0	0	0	1
10	FW	70	(Nigeria) Jesse Sekidika	1	0	0	0	0	1
10	DF	99	(South Korea) Kang Jun-hyuk	1	0	0	0	0	1
-	Own goals			3	0	0	0	0	3
Totals				44	0	0	0	2	46

=== Top assists ===
Italic marked players have left during the season.

Rank	Pos.	No.	Player	K League 1	2026–27 Korea Cup	2025–26 ACLE	2026–27 ACLE	2026–27 ACLT	Total
1	FW	7	(South Korea) Kim Dae-won	10	0	0	0	0	10
2	FW	10	(South Korea) Mo Jae-hyeon	6	0	0	0	0	6
3	MF	97	(South Korea) Lee You-hyeon	3	0	0	0	0	3
3	DF	99	(South Korea) Kang Jun-hyuk	2	0	0	0	1	3
5	MF	11	(South Korea) Goh Young-jun	2	0	0	0	0	2
5	FW	96	(South Korea) Choe Byeong-chan	2	0	0	0	0	2
7	MF	4	(South Korea) Seo Min-woo	1	0	0	0	0	1
7	DF	5	(Sweden) Abdelkarim Mammar	1	0	0	0	0	1
7	MF	6	(South Korea) Kim Dong-hyun	1	0	0	0	0	1
7	FW	9	(South Korea) Kim Gun-hee	1	0	0	0	0	1
7	MF	14	(South Korea) Kang Yun-gu	1	0	0	0	0	1
7	DF	24	(South Korea) Park Ho-young	1	0	0	0	0	1
Totals				31	0	0	0	1	32

=== Clean sheets ===
Rank	No.	Player	K League 1	2026–27 Korea Cup	2025–26 ACLE	2026–27 ACLE	2026–27 ACLT	Total
1	1	(South Korea) Park Cheong-hyo	14	0	3	0	1	18
2	41	(South Korea) Kim Yu-seong	0	0	0	0	1	1
2	51	(South Korea) Cho Min-kyu	0	1	0	0	0	1
Totals			14	1	3	0	2	20

=== Discipline ===
Rank	Pos.	No.	Player	K League 1			2026–27 Korea Cup			2025–26 ACLE			2026–27 ACLE			2026–27 ACLT			Total		
Rank	Pos.	No.	Player	Yellow card	(yellow card) (yellow-red card)	Red card	Yellow card	(yellow card) (yellow-red card)	Red card	Yellow card	(yellow card) (yellow-red card)	Red card	Yellow card	(yellow card) (yellow-red card)	Red card	Yellow card	(yellow card) (yellow-red card)	Red card	Yellow card	(yellow card) (yellow-red card)	Red card
1	DF	23	(Montenegro) Marko Tući	8															8		
2	MF	4	(South Korea) Seo Min-woo	4		1				1			1						6		1
2	FW	7	(South Korea) Kim Dae-won	6									1						7		
2	FW	10	(South Korea) Mo Jae-hyeon	5						2									7		
5	DF	34	(South Korea) Song Jun-seok	5		1													5		1
5	MF	97	(South Korea) Lee You-hyeon	5						1									6		
5	DF	99	(South Korea) Kang Jun-hyuk	6															6		
8	DF	13	(South Korea) Lee Ki-hyuk	4									1						5		
9	DF	47	(South Korea) Shin Min-ha	3									1						4		
9	FW	77	(Israel) Abdallah Hleihel	4															4		
11	FW	9	(South Korea) Kim Gun-hee	3															3		
11	MF	11	(South Korea) Goh Young-jun	3															3		
11	MF	14	(South Korea) Kang Yun-gu	1												2			3		
11	DF	24	(South Korea) Park Ho-young	3															3		
11	DF	27	(South Korea) Kim Do-hyun	3															3		
11	DF	71	(South Korea) Kang Seong-yoon	1												2			3		
17	DF	3	(South Korea) Jeong Seung-bin													2			2		
17	FW	19	(South Korea) Park Sang-hyeok	2															2		
17	DF	33	(South Korea) Hong Chul	1		1													1		1
17	FW	96	(South Korea) Choe Byeong-chan	1												1			2		
21	MF	6	(South Korea) Kim Dong-hyun													1			1		
21	MF	8	(South Korea) Lee Seung-won													1			1		
21	FW	17	(South Korea) Lee Eun-ho													1			1		
21	DF	25	(South Korea) Lee Hyo-bin	1															1		
21	DF	29	(South Korea) Choi Jae-hyeok													1			1		
21	FW	39	(South Korea) Lee Ji-ho				1												1		
21	MF	75	(South Korea) Kim Yi-seok													1			1		
21	DF	88	(South Korea) Hwang Mun-ki	1															1		
Totals				70		3	1			4			4			12			91		3

== Awards ==
=== Monthly awards ===
Note : Player of the Month, Goal of the Month, Save of the Month and Delivery of the Month have official nominees. Only month included Gangwon FC manager or players are listed.

Month	Player of the Month		Save of the Month		Goal of the Month		Delivery of the Month	
Month	Player	Result	Player	Result	Player	Result	Player	Result
April	(South Korea) Kim Dae-won (FW)	Won					(South Korea) Kim Dae-won (FW)	Nominated
May	(South Korea) Lee Gi-hyuk (DF)	Won	(South Korea) Park Cheong-hyo (GK)	Nominated				
May	(South Korea) Kim Dae-won (FW)	Nominated						
July	(South Korea) Kim Dae-won (FW)	Nominated						
August					(South Korea) Kim Dong-hyun (MF)	Won	(South Korea) Lee You-hyeon (MF)	Nominated
September	(South Korea) Lee You-hyeon (MF)	Nominated			(Sweden) Abdelkarim Mammar (DF)	Nominated		

=== Round awards ===
Note : Bold players are determined the MVP of the round. Only rounds included Gangwon FC players are listed.

Date	Round	Best Eleven of the round				Team of the round
Date	Round	Forwards	Midfielders	Defenders	Goalkeeper	Team of the round
4–5 April	Round 6	(South Korea) Choe Byeong-chan	(South Korea) Lee You-hyeon (South Korea) Mo Jae-hyeon	(Montenegro) Marko Tući		Gangwon FC
11–12 April	Round 7	(South Korea) Kim Dae-won	(South Korea) Goh Young-jun	(South Korea) Lee Ki-hyuk		Gangwon FC
18–19 April	Round 8		(South Korea) Kim Dae-won			
21–22 April	Round 9		(South Korea) Kim Dae-won			
2 May	Round 11	(South Korea) Kim Dae-won		(South Korea) Lee Ki-hyuk		
5 May	Round 12			(South Korea) Lee Ki-hyuk	(South Korea) Park Cheong-hyo	
12–13 May	Round 14	(South Korea) Kim Dae-won	(South Korea) Mo Jae-hyeon	(South Korea) Lee Ki-hyuk		Gangwon FC
16–17 May	Round 15		(South Korea) Lee You-hyeon	(South Korea) Lee Ki-hyuk (Montenegro) Marko Tući		Gangwon FC
4–5 July	Round 16		(South Korea) Mo Jae-hyeon (South Korea) Lee You-hyeon (South Korea) Song Jun-seok	(Montenegro) Marko Tući		Gangwon FC
11–12 July	Round 17			(South Korea) Lee Ki-hyuk		
18–19 July	Round 18	(South Korea) Kim Dae-won	(South Korea) Lee You-hyeon			
15–16 August	Round 23		(South Korea) Kim Dong-hyun			
5–6 September	Round 27	(South Korea) Kim Gun-hee	(South Korea) Mo Jae-hyeon	(Sweden) Abdelkarim Mammar		
8–9 September	Round 28		(South Korea) Lee You-hyeon			
9–11 October	Round 31			(Sweden) Abdelkarim Mammar		
24 October	Round 33			(South Korea) Kang Jun-hyuk		
7–8 November	Round 35	(South Korea) Kim Dae-won	(South Korea) Mo Jae-hyeon	(South Korea) Shin Min-ha		Gangwon FC
