= Goh Young-jun =

South Korean footballer (born 2001)

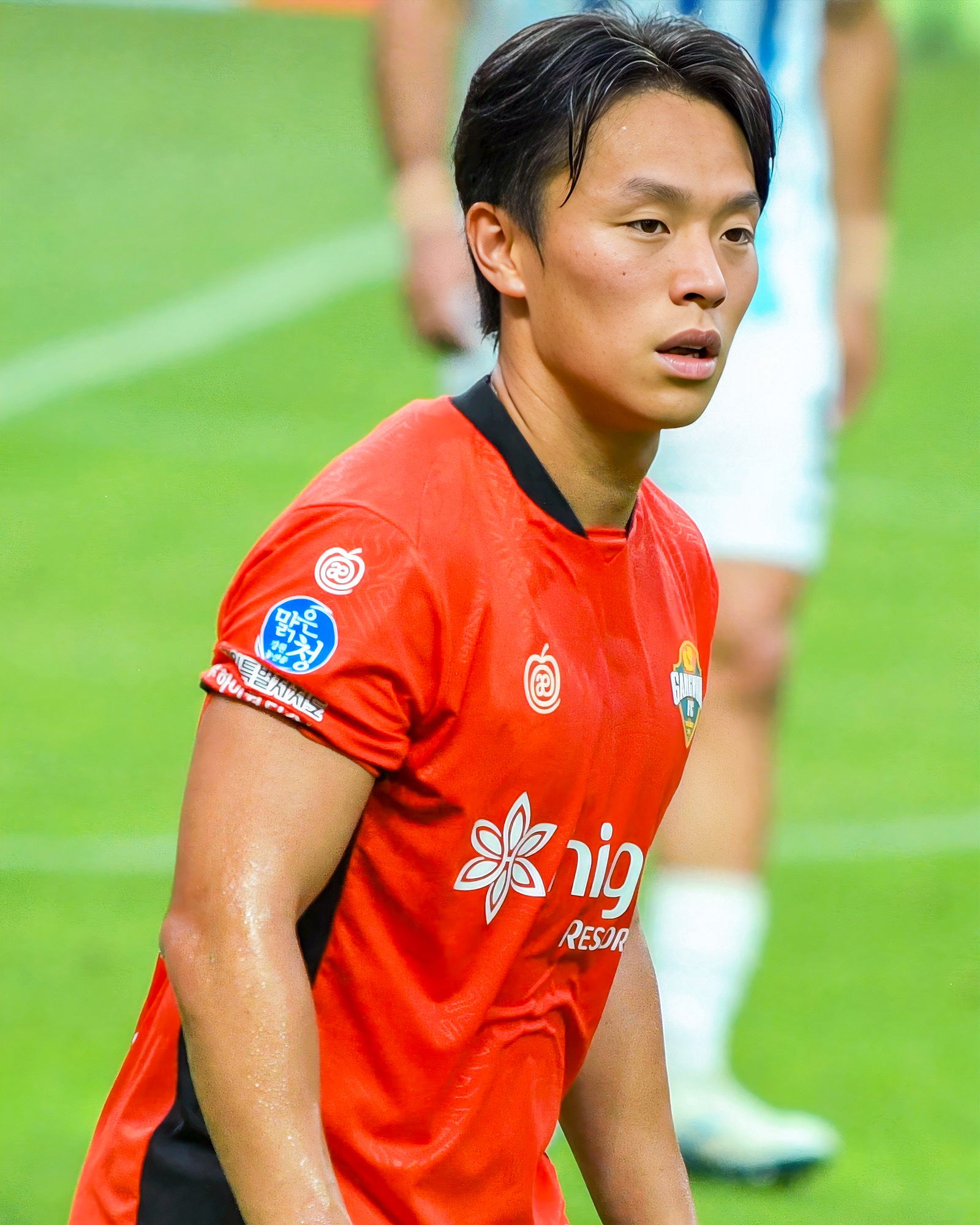
- Goh in 2026

Personal information
- Date of birth: 9 July 2001 (age 25)
- Place of birth: Jinju, Gyeongsangnam-do, South Korea
- Height: 1.72 m (5 ft 8 in)
- Positions: Attacking midfielder; winger

Team information
- Current team: Gangwon FC (on loan from Górnik Zabrze)
- Number: 11

Youth career
- –2020: Pohang Steelers

Senior career*
Years	Team	Apps	(Gls)
2020–2024	Pohang Steelers	105	(19)
2024–2025	Partizan	33	(2)
2025–	Górnik Zabrze	9	(0)
2026–	→ Gangwon FC (loan)	30	(1)

International career
2018	South Korea U17	5	(0)
2019	South Korea U20	7	(1)
2021–2023	South Korea U23	18	(2)
2022	South Korea	1	(0)
Medal record
Men's football
Representing South Korea
Asian Games
Gold medal – first place	2022 Hangzhou	Team
EAFF Championship
Runner-up	2022 Japan	Team
- * Club domestic league appearances and goals as of 23:34, 4 November 2026 (UTC)

- Goh Young-jun
- Hangul: 고영준
- RR: Go Yeongjun
- MR: Ko Yŏngjun

Goh Young-jun (Korean: 고영준; born 9 July 2001) is a South Korean professional footballer who plays as an attacking midfielder or a winger for K League 1 club Gangwon FC, on loan from Górnik Zabrze.

== Club career ==
=== Partizan ===
On 23 January 2024, Serbian SuperLiga club Partizan announced that Goh had signed on a three-and-a-half-year deal for an undisclosed fee. Goh made his debut in a convincing triumph against IMT (5–2) and crowned it with a goal in the 90th minute. On 9 March 2024, in the 172nd Eternal derby, Partizan and Red Star drew 2–2. Goh started the counterattack for his team's second goal when he did a nutmeg on Guélor Kanga then cut into the opponent's half and passed the ball to Ghayas Zahid who assisted Aldo Kalulu for the goal.

=== Górnik Zabrze ===
On 18 June 2025, Goh moved to Polish Ekstraklasa club Górnik Zabrze for an undisclosed fee, signing a three-year contract.

==== Loan to Gangwon ====
On 8 January 2026, Goh moved back to South Korea, joining Gangwon FC on loan until the end of the year.

== International career ==
Goh made his debut for the South Korea national team in 2022.

== Career statistics ==
=== Club ===
As of match played 4 November 2026

Appearances and goals by club, season and competition
Club	Season	League			National cup (Note: Includes Korean FA Cup, Serbian Cup, Polish Cup)		Continental		Other		Total	
Club	Season	Division	Apps	Goals	Apps	Goals	Apps	Goals	Apps	Goals	Apps	Goals
Pohang Steelers	2020	K League 1	8	2	2	0	—		—		10	2
Pohang Steelers	2021	K League 1	32	3	2	0	9 (Note: Appearances in AFC Champions League)	0	—		43	3
Pohang Steelers	2022	K League 1	37	6	3	0	—		—		40	6
Pohang Steelers	2023	K League 1	28	8	3	0	2	1	—		33	9
Pohang Steelers	Total		105	19	10	0	11	1	0	0	126	20
Partizan	2023–24	Serbian SuperLiga	17	1	2	0	0	0	—		19	1
Partizan	2024–25	Serbian SuperLiga	16	1	2	0	5 (Note: Two appearances in UEFA Champions League, two appearances in UEFA Europa League, one appearance in UEFA Conference League)	0	—		23	1
Partizan	Total		33	2	4	0	5	0	0	0	42	2
Górnik Zabrze	2025–26	Ekstraklasa	9	0	2	0	—		—		11	0
Gangwon FC (loan)	2026	K League 1	30	1	2	0	5 (Note: Appearances in AFC Champions League Elite)	0	—		37	1
Career total			177	22	18	0	21	1	0	0	216	23

=== International ===
Appearances and goals by national team and year
National team	Year	Apps	Goals
South Korea	2022	1	0
Total		1	0

== Honours ==
Pohang Steelers

- Korean FA Cup: 2023
- AFC Champions League runner-up: 2021

South Korea U23

- Asian Games: 2022
