= Kim Dae-won (footballer, born 1997) =

South Korean footballer

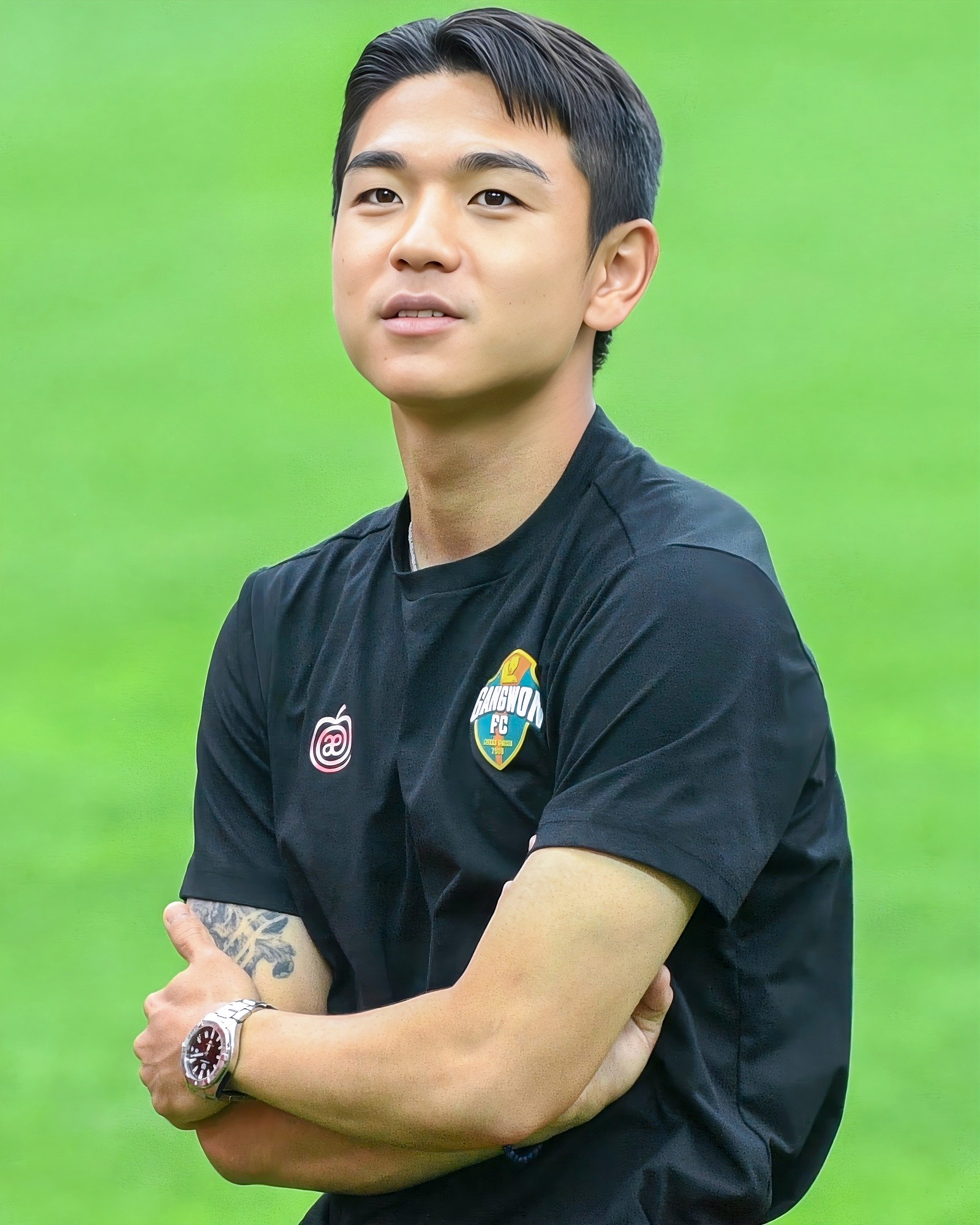
- Kim in 2026

Personal information
- Date of birth: 10 February 1997 (age 29)
- Place of birth: South Korea
- Height: 1.72 m (5 ft 8 in)
- Position: Forward

Team information
- Current team: Gangwon FC
- Number: 7

Senior career*
Years	Team	Apps	(Gls)
2016–2020	Daegu FC	102	(11)
2021–	Gangwon FC	156	(37)
2024–2025	→ Gimcheon Sangmu (draft)	39	(5)

International career^{‡}
2015	South Korea U20	14 (Note: Includes three appearances against non-national team.)	(4)
2017–2021	South Korea U23	16 (Note: Includes two appearances against another KFA team.)	(3)
2022–	South Korea	0	(0)
Medal record
Representing South Korea
Men's football
AFC U-23 Championship
Gold medal – first place	2020 Thailand
Korean name
Hangul	김대원
Hanja	金大元
RR	Gim Daewon
MR	Kim Taewŏn
- * Club domestic league appearances and goals as of 8 November 2026 ‡ National team caps and goals as of 28 December 2021

Kim Dae-won (Korean: 김대원; born 10 February 1997) is a South Korean football forward, who plays for Gangwon FC in the K League 1. He has previously played for Daegu FC and Gimcheon Sangmu FC.

== Club career ==
Born on 10 February 1997, Kim scored a goal on his debut for Daegu FC on 25 May 2016, playing against FC Anyang in the K League 2. In January 2021, he transferred to Gangwon FC.

== Club career statistics ==
As of match played 8 November 2026

Appearances and goals by club, season and competition
Club	Season	League			National cup		Continental		Other		Total	
Club	Season	Division	Apps	Goals	Apps	Goals	Apps	Goals	Apps	Goals	Apps	Goals
Daegu FC	2016	K League 2	6	1	0	0	—		—		6	1
Daegu FC	2017	K League 1	10	0	1	0	—		—		11	0
Daegu FC	2018	K League 1	23	3	5	4	—		—		28	7
Daegu FC	2019	K League 1	36	4	2	1	6 (Note: Appearances in AFC Champions League Elite)	2	—		44	7
Daegu FC	2020	K League 1	27	3	2	2	—		—		29	5
Daegu FC	Total		102	11	10	7	6	2	—		118	20
Gangwon FC	2021	K League 1	33	9	2	2	—		2 (Note: Appearances in K League Promotion-Relegation play-offs)	0	37	11
Gangwon FC	2022	K League 1	37	12	2	1	—		—		39	13
Gangwon FC	2023	K League 1	35	4	2	1	—		2	0	39	5
Gangwon FC	2025	K League 1	18	2	2	1	5	1	—		25	4
Gangwon FC	2026	K League 1	33	10	0	0	6 (Note: Five appearances in AFC Champions League Elite, one appearance in AFC Champions League Two)	0	—		39	10
Gangwon FC	Total		156	37	8	5	11	1	4	0	179	43
Gimcheon Sangmu (draft)	2024	K League 1	28	5	1	0	—		—		29	5
Gimcheon Sangmu (draft)	2025	K League 1	11	0	2	0	—		—		13	0
Gimcheon Sangmu (draft)	Total		39	5	3	0	—		—		42	5
Career total			297	53	21	12	17	3	4	0	339	68

== International career ==
In December 2019, Kim was selected to be part of the South Korean squad for the 2020 AFC U-23 Championship, to be held in Thailand. South Korea won the championship, with Kim playing in five matches and scoring a goal against Australia.

== Honors and awards ==
=== Domestic ===
Daegu FC

- Korean FA Cup Winners (1) : 2018

=== International ===
South Korea U23

- AFC U-23 Championship: 2020

=== Individual ===
- K League 1 Best XI (1): 2022
