= Kang Yun-gu =

South Korean footballer

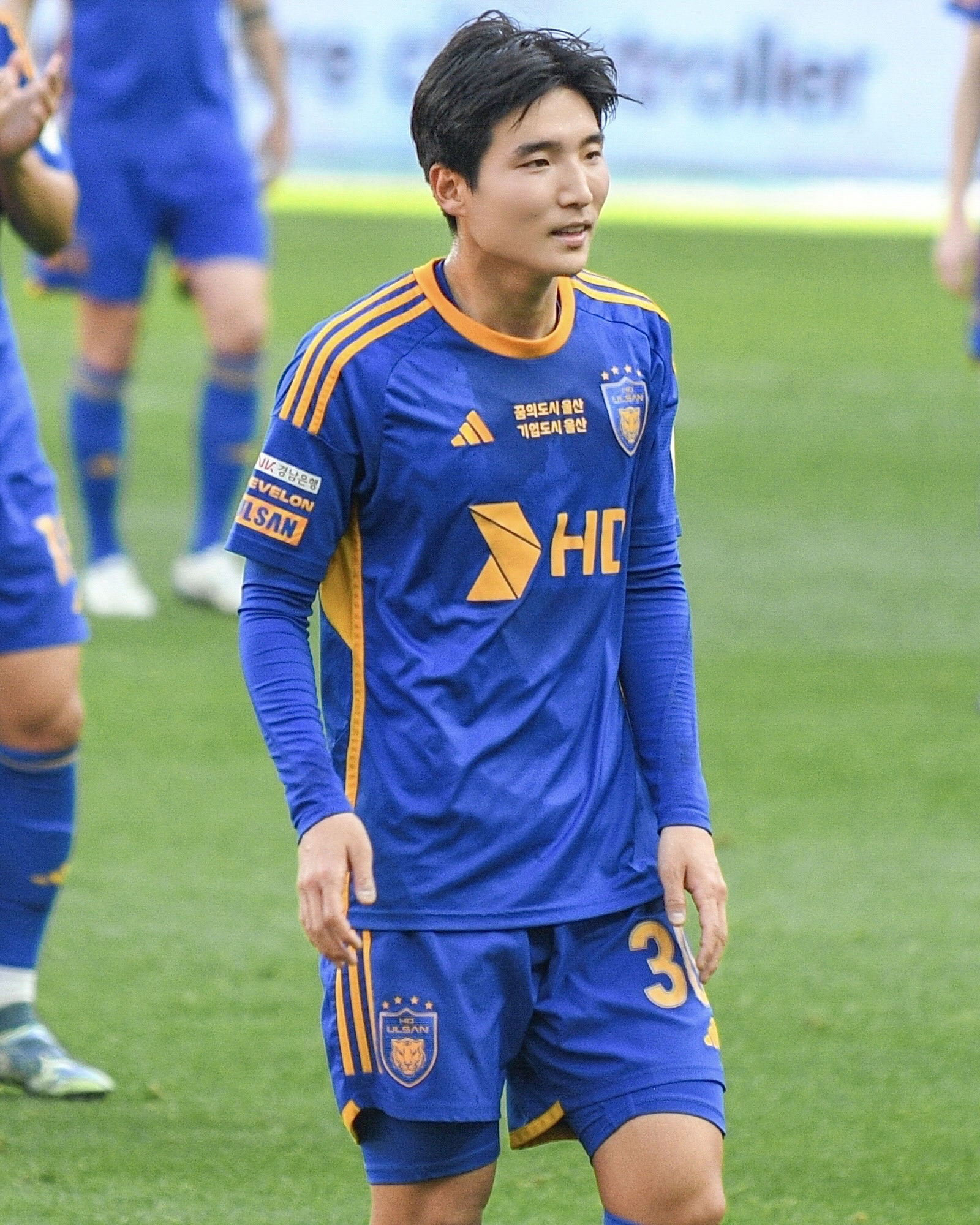
- Kang in 2024

Personal information
- Date of birth: 8 April 2002 (age 24)
- Place of birth: Seoul, South Korea
- Height: 1.77 m (5 ft 10 in)
- Position: Midfielder

Team information
- Current team: Gangwon FC
- Number: 14

Youth career
- 2012: Uiwang Jeongwoo Soccer Club
- 2013: Hanam Chunhyun Elementary School
- 2014: Suwon Bluewings
- 2016–2020: Goal Club

Senior career*
Years	Team	Apps	(Gls)
2021–2024	Ulsan HD	46	(3)
2022	→ Busan IPark (loan)	13	(1)
2025-	Gangwon FC	13	(0)
- * Club domestic league appearances and goals as of 3 August 2026

- Kang Yun-gu
- Hangul: 강윤구
- RR: Gang Yungu
- MR: Kang Yun'gu

Kang Yun-gu (Korean: 강윤구; born 8 April 2002) is a South Korean footballer currently playing as a midfielder for Gangwon FC.

== Career statistics ==
=== Club ===
As of 22 May 2025.

Appearances and goals by club, season and competition
Club	Season	League			National cup		Continental		Other		Total	
Club	Season	Division	Apps	Goals	Apps	Goals	Apps	Goals	Apps	Goals	Apps	Goals
Ulsan HD	2021	K League 1	7	0	0	0	1 (Note: Appearances in AFC Champions League)	0	1 (Note: Appearance in FIFA Club World Cup)	0	9	0
Ulsan HD	2023	K League 1	19	1	0	0	0	0	—		19	1
Ulsan HD	2024	K League 1	20	2	0	0	0	0	—		20	2
Ulsan HD	Total		46	3	0	0	1	0	1	0	48	13
Busan IPark (loan)	2022	K League 2	13	1	2	0	—		—		15	1
Gangwon FC	2025	K League 1	0	0	0	0	0	0	—		0	0
Career total			59	4	2	0	1	0	1	0	63	4
