= Song Jun-seok =

South Korean footballer (born 2001)

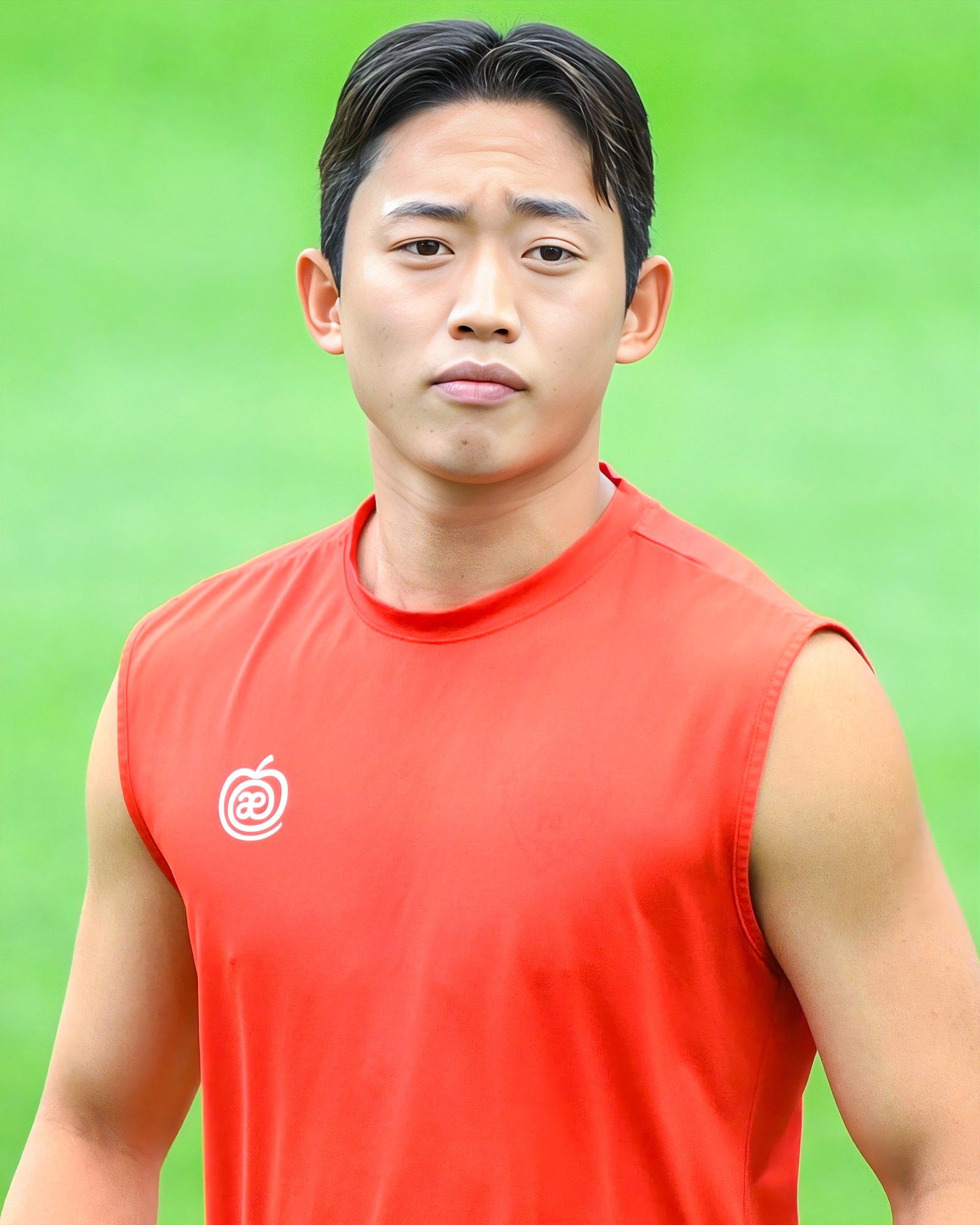
- Song in 2026

Personal information
- Full name: Song Jun-seok
- Date of birth: 6 February 2001 (age 25)
- Place of birth: Seoul, South Korea
- Height: 1.71 m (5 ft 7 in)
- Position: Left-back

Team information
- Current team: Gimcheon Sangmu

College career
| Years | Team | Apps | (Gls) |
| 2020 | Cheongju University | 6 | (0) |

Senior career*
| Years | Team | Apps | (Gls) |
| 2021– | Gangwon FC | 73 | (2) |
| 2021–2022 | → Gangwon FC B | 42 | (3) |
| 2023 | → Gimpo FC (loan) | 16 | (0) |
| 2026– | → Gimcheon Sangmu (military duty) | 0 | (0) |
Korean name
| Hangul | 송준석 |
| RR | Song Junseok |
| MR | Song Chunsŏk |
- * Club domestic league appearances and goals as of 15 March 2026

Song Jun-seok (Korean: 송준석; born 6 February 2001) is a South Korean footballer currently playing as a left-back for Gimcheon Sangmu on loan from Gangwon FC, where he hold his militery duty from 3 August 2026.

== Club career ==
He graduated from Unnam High School before enrolling at Cheongju University. After one year at the university, he left to join Gangwon FC in 2021.

He subsequently played for the club's B team and in 2023 spent time on loan at Gimpo FC.

On 2 April 2026, his loan for military duty was announced and his loan was started from 3 August 2026.

== Career statistics ==
As of 3 August 2026.

| Club | Season | League | | | National Cup | | Continental | | Other | | Total | |
| Club | Season | Division | Apps | Goals | Apps | Goals | Apps | Goals | Apps | Goals | Apps | Goals |
|---|---|---|---|---|---|---|---|---|---|---|---|---|
| Gangwon FC B | 2021 | K4 League | 15 | 2 | — | | — | | — | | 15 | 2 |
| Gangwon FC B | 2022 | K4 League | 27 | 1 | — | | — | | — | | 27 | 1 |
| Gangwon FC B | Total | | 42 | 3 | — | | — | | — | | 42 | 3 |
| Gangwon FC | 2021 | K League 1 | 11 | 0 | 2 | 0 | — | | 0 (Note: Appearance in K League promotion-relegation play-offs) | 0 | 13 | 0 |
| Gangwon FC | 2022 | K League 1 | 0 | 0 | 0 | 0 | — | | — | | 0 | 0 |
| Gangwon FC | 2024 | K League 1 | 22 | 1 | 2 | 1 | — | | — | | 24 | 2 |
| Gangwon FC | 2025 | K League 1 | 24 | 0 | 2 | 0 | 3 (Note: Appearance in AFC Champions League Elite) | 1 | — | | 29 | 1 |
| Gangwon FC | 2026 | K League 1 | 16 | 1 | — | | 4 | 0 | — | | 20 | 1 |
| Gangwon FC | Total | | 73 | 2 | 6 | 1 | 7 | 1 | 0 | 0 | 86 | 4 |
| Gimpo FC (loan) | 2023 | K League 2 | 16 | 0 | 2 | 1 | — | | 3 | 0 | 21 | 1 |
| Gimcheon Sangmu (military duty) | 2026 | K League 1 | 0 | 0 | 0 | 0 | — | | — | | 0 | 0 |
| Career total | | | 131 | 5 | 8 | 2 | 7 | 1 | 3 | 0 | 149 | 8 |

Colleage statistccs

| Colleage | Season | League | | | Other | | Total | |
| Colleage | Season | Division | Apps | Goals | Apps | Goals | Apps | Goals |
|---|---|---|---|---|---|---|---|---|
| Cheongju University | 2020 | U-League | 6 | 0 | 1 (Note: Appearance in U-League Championships) | 0 | 7 | 0 |
| Career total | | | 6 | 0 | 1 | 0 | 7 | 0 |

== Honours ==
Gangwon FC

- K League 1 runner-up: 2024
