= Park Ho-young =

South Korean footballer (born 1999)

Personal information
- Date of birth: 7 April 1999 (age 27)
- Height: 1.94 m (6 ft 4 in)
- Position: Defender

Team information
- Current team: Gangwon FC
- Number: 24

Youth career
- 2015–2017: Gaesong High School

Senior career*
| Years | Team | Apps | (Gls) |
| 2018–2023 | Busan IPark | 40 | (0) |
| 2023 | → Busan IPark Futures | 12 | (0) |
| 2024 | Pocheon Citizen | 20 | (3) |
| 2025– | Gangwon FC | 28 | (0) |

International career^{‡}
| 2019 | South Korea U20 | 2 | (0) |
- * Club domestic league appearances and goals as of 3 August 2026 ‡ National team caps and goals as of 18 April 2019

Park Ho-young (Korean: 박호영; born 7 April 1999) is a South Korean footballer currently playing as a defender for Gangwon FC.

== Career statistics ==
=== Club ===
As of 16 September 2025.

Appearances and goals by club, season and competition
| Club | Season | League | | | Cup | | Continental | | Other | | Total | |
| Club | Season | Division | Apps | Goals | Apps | Goals | Apps | Goals | Apps | Goals | Apps | Goals |
|---|---|---|---|---|---|---|---|---|---|---|---|---|
| Busan IPark | 2018 | K League 2 | 2 | 0 | 0 | 0 | – | | 0 | 0 | 2 | 0 |
| Busan IPark | 2019 | K League 2 | 7 | 0 | 0 | 0 | – | | 1 (Note: Appearance in K League Promotion-Relegation play-offs) | 0 | 8 | 0 |
| Busan IPark | 2020 | K League 1 | 2 | 0 | 2 | 0 | – | | – | | 4 | 0 |
| Busan IPark | 2021 | K League 2 | 27 | 0 | 1 | 0 | – | | – | | 28 | 0 |
| Busan IPark | 2022 | K League 2 | 2 | 0 | 1 | 0 | – | | – | | 3 | 0 |
| Busan IPark | 2023 | K League 2 | 0 | 0 | 1 | 0 | – | | 0 | 0 | 1 | 0 |
| Busan IPark | Total | | 40 | 0 | 5 | 0 | – | | 1 | 0 | 46 | 0 |
| Busan IPark Futures | 2023 | K4 League | 12 | 0 | – | | – | | – | | 12 | 0 |
| Pocheon Citizen | 2024 | K3 League | 20 | 3 | 2 | 0 | – | | 1 (Note: Appearance in K3 League Relegation play-off) | 0 | 23 | 3 |
| Gangwon FC | 2025 | K League 1 | 13 | 0 | 4 | 0 | 1 (Note: Appearances in AFC Champions League Elite) | 0 | – | | 18 | 0 |
| Career total | | | 85 | 3 | 11 | 0 | 1 | 0 | 2 | 0 | 99 | 3 |
