= Lee Gi-hyuk =

South Korean footballer (born 2000)

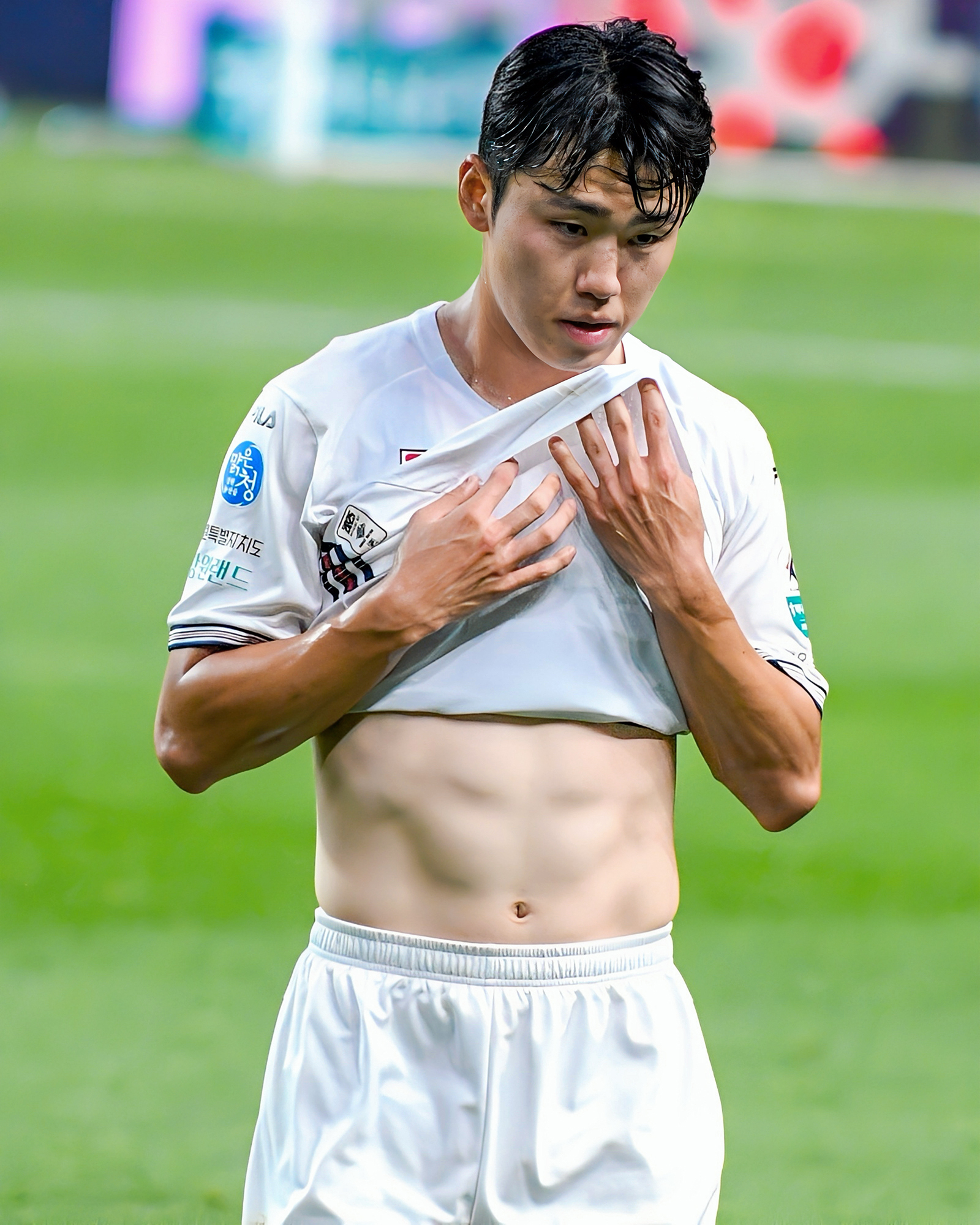
- Lee in 2025

Personal information
- Date of birth: 7 July 2000 (age 26)
- Place of birth: Seoul, South Korea
- Height: 1.84 m (6 ft 0 in)
- Positions: Defender; defensive midfielder

Team information
- Current team: Gangwon FC
- Number: 13

Youth career
- 2013–2018: Ulsan Hyundai

College career
Years	Team	Apps	(Gls)
2019–2020	University of Ulsan		

Senior career*
Years	Team	Apps	(Gls)
2021–2022	Suwon FC	35	(0)
2023	Jeju United	19	(0)
2024–	Gangwon FC	93	(0)

International career^{‡}
2026	South Korea U23	4 (Note: Appearances as an overage player in Asian Games)	(0)
2022–	South Korea	6	(0)
Medal record
Men's football
Representing South Korea
Asian Games
Gold medal – first place	2026 Aichi–Nagoya
EAFF Championship
Runner-up	2022 Japan
- * Club domestic league appearances and goals as of 8 November 2026 ‡ National team caps and goals as of 3 October 2026

- Lee Gi-hyuk
- Hangul: 이기혁
- Hanja: 李期奕
- RR: I Gihyeok
- MR: I Kihyŏk
- IPA: [i.ɡi.ɦjʌk̚]

Lee Gi-hyuk (Korean: 이기혁; born 7 July 2000) is a South Korean professional footballer who plays as a defender or defensive midfielder for K League 1 club Gangwon FC and the South Korea national team.

== Club career ==
After attending University of Ulsan for two years, Lee joined K League 1 club Suwon FC prior to the 2021 season. On 27 February 2021, he made his professional debut in the club's league opener against Daegu FC, where they drew 1–1. He played as a central or wide midfielder for two years at Suwon FC before transferring to the same league's Jeju United in 2023. On 24 May 2023, he scored his first professional goal in a 4–3 Korean FA Cup win over Daejeon Hana Citizen.

On 20 January 2024, Lee moved to another K League 1 club Gangwon FC. He started to be deployed as a centre-back or left-back at Gangwon, and helped the team finish runners-up at the league. By director Kim Byung-ji, his tactical understanding was compared to Yoo Sang-chul, who had been able to be used in every midfield or defensive position at the South Korea national team.

== International career ==
In September 2021, Lee was called up to the South Korea under-23 team for a training camp ahead of the 2022 AFC U-23 Asian Cup qualification. In July 2022, he was called up to the South Korea national team for the 2022 EAFF E-1 Football Championship. On 24 July, he made his international debut in a 3–0 EAFF Championship win over Hong Kong.

=== 2026 World Cup ===
Lee was suddenly selected for the national team for the 2026 FIFA World Cup. He did not play for South Korea for about four years, but his performances at the K League 1 impressed manager Hong Myung-bo, who had to find a replacement for injured centre-back Kim Ju-sung just before the tournament. After another centre-back Kim Tae-hyeon was injured in training two days before the team's opener, he played three group stage matches as a starter.

=== 2026 Asian Games and controversy ===
At the 2026 Asian Games, Lee captained South Korea under-23s for which he was selected as one of three overage players. While playing as a defensive midfielder at the tournament, he helped the under-23 team win their fourth consecutive title, but had difficulty providing accurate passes and protecting the team's defensive line. After the 1–0 final win over hosts Japan, Lee received a gold medal, qualifying for special exemption from compulsory military service according to South Korean law.

In front of microphones after a medal ceremony, however, Lee bluntly said "I do not go to the military." even before television reporters asked him his feelings. He also emphasized his eagerness to be exempted from military service in the middle of the interview. His remarks which focused on special benefit rather than national prestige caused public antipathy in South Korea. Lee later apologized for his remarks and explained he had not ignored responsibility as a national team player. In addition to Lee's remarks, Yang Min-hyeok's remark, that "the medal or trophy was not important", and Park Seung-soo's imitation of discharge ceremony made South Korea's National Assembly discuss about the abolition of Asian Games gold medalists' exemption from military service.

== Career statistics ==
=== Club ===
As of match played 8 November 2026

Appearances and goals by club, season and competition
Club	Season	League			Cup		Continental		Total	
Club	Season	Division	Apps	Goals	Apps	Goals	Apps	Goals	Apps	Goals
Suwon FC	2021	K League 1	15	0	1	0	—		16	0
Suwon FC	2022	K League 1	20	0	1	0	—		21	0
Suwon FC	Total		35	0	2	0	—		37	0
Jeju United	2023	K League 1	19	0	4	1	—		23	1
Gangwon FC	2024	K League 1	35	0	0	0	—		35	0
Gangwon FC	2025	K League 1	31	0	2	0	3 (Note: Appearances in AFC Champions League Elite)	0	36	0
Gangwon FC	2026	K League 1	27	0	0	0	5	0	32	0
Gangwon FC	Total		93	0	2	0	8	0	103	0
Career total			147	0	8	1	8	0	163	1

=== International ===
As of match played 24 June 2026

Appearances and goals by national team and year
National team	Year	Apps	Goals
South Korea	2022	1	0
South Korea	2026	5	0
Total		6	0

== Honours ==
South Korea

- EAFF Championship runner-up: 2022

South Korea U23

- Asian Games: 2026

Individual

- K League All-Star: 2026
