= Kim Dong-hyun (footballer, born 1997) =

Korean association football player

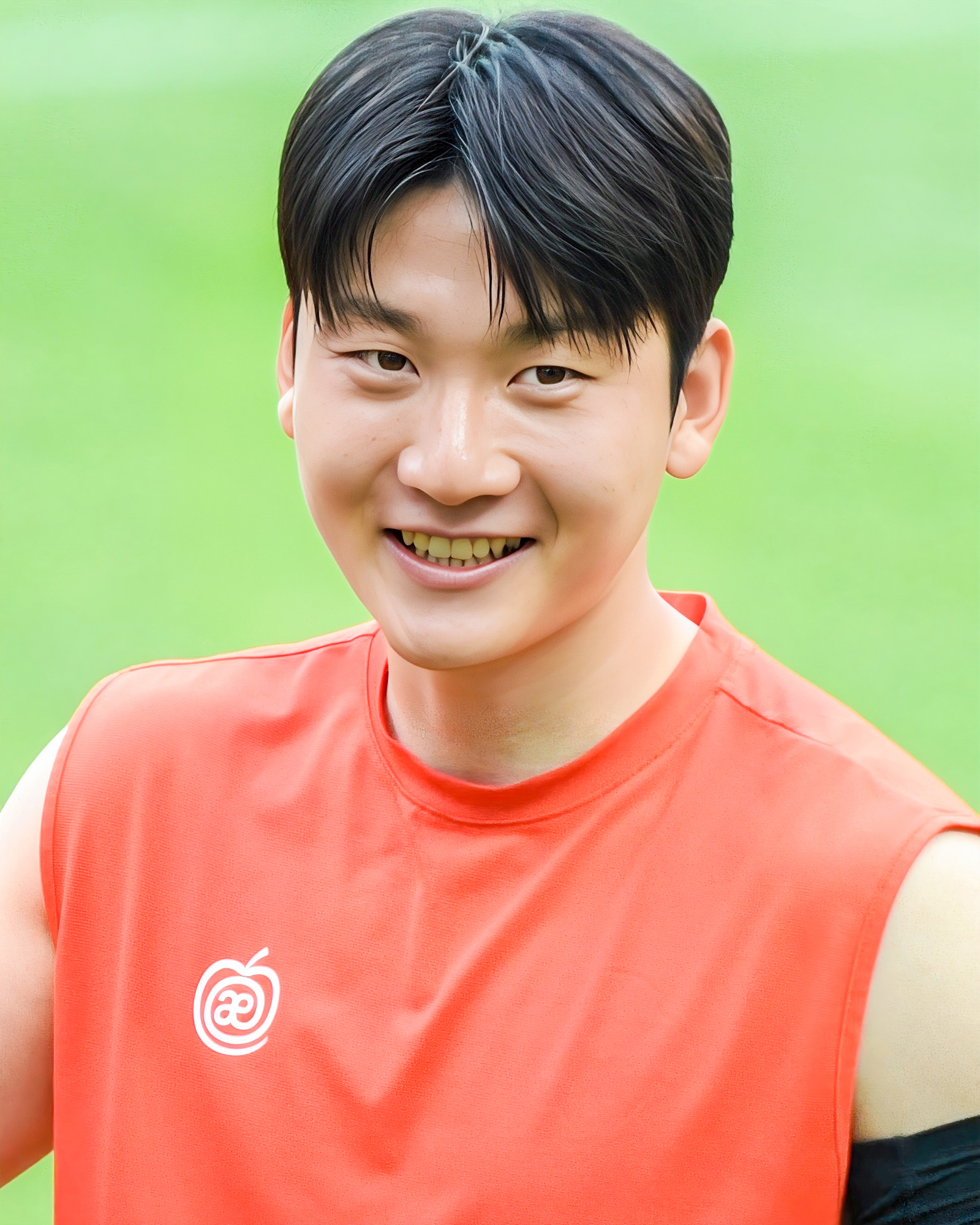
- Kim in 2026

Personal information
- Date of birth: 11 June 1997 (age 29)
- Place of birth: Seoul, South Korea
- Height: 1.82 m (6 ft 0 in)
- Positions: Defensive midfielder; right back

Team information
- Current team: Gangwon FC
- Number: 6

Youth career
- 2010–2016: Pohang Steelers
- 2016–2018: Chung-Ang University

Senior career*
Years	Team	Apps	(Gls)
2018	Pohang Steelers	0	(0)
2018	→ Gwangju FC (loan)	35	(3)
2019–2020	Seongnam FC	28	(0)
2021–	Gangwon FC	98	(2)
2023–2024	→ Gimcheon Sangmu (draft)	34	(2)

International career^{‡}
2015	South Korea U20	4	(0)
2019–2021	South Korea U23	18 (Note: Includes one appearance against another KFA team.)	(0)
2022–	South Korea	3	(0)
Medal record
Representing South Korea
Men's football
AFC U-23 Championship
Gold medal – first place	2020 Thailand	Team
EAFF E-1 Football Championship
Runner-up	2022 Japan	Team
Korean name
Hangul	김동현
Hanja	金東現
RR	Gim Donghyeon
MR	Kim Tonghyŏn
- * Club domestic league appearances and goals as of 3 August 2026 ‡ National team caps and goals as of 27 July 2022

Kim Dong-hyun (Korean: 김동현; born 11 June 1997) is a South Korean footballer who plays as a defensive midfielder or a right back for Gangwon FC and the South Korea national team.

== Career statistics ==
=== Club ===
As of match played 22 May 2025

Appearances and goals by club, season and competition
Club	Season	League			National Cup		Continental		Other		Total	
Club	Season	Division	Apps	Goals	Apps	Goals	Apps	Goals	Apps	Goals	Apps	Goals
Pohang Steelers	2018	K League 1	—		—		—		—		—	
Gwangju FC (loan)	2018	K League 2	35	3	0	0	—		1 (Note: Appearances in K League Promotion-Relegation play-offs)	0	36	3
Seongnam FC	2019	K League 1	7	0	1	0	—		—		8	0
Seongnam FC	2020	K League 1	21	0	2	0	—		—		23	0
Seongnam FC	Total		28	0	3	0	—		—		31	0
Gangwon FC	2021	K League 1	23	1	3	0	—		0	0	26	1
Gangwon FC	2022	K League 1	33	0	2	0	—		—		35	0
Gangwon FC	2024	K League 1	12	0	—		—		—		12	0
Gangwon FC	2025	K League 1	11	0	0	0	0	0	—		11	0
Gangwon FC	Total		79	1	5	0	0	0	0	0	84	1
Gimcheon Sangmu (draft)	2023	K League 2	21	2	0	0	—		—		21	2
Gimcheon Sangmu (draft)	2024	K League 1	13	0	0	0	—		—		13	0
Gimcheon Sangmu (draft)	Total		34	2	0	0	—		—		34	2
Career total			176	6	8	0	0	0	1	0	185	6
