= Abdelkarim Mammar =

Swedish footballer (born 2001)

Karim Mammar
Personal information
- Full name: Abdelkarim Mammar Chaouche
- Date of birth: 21 October 1996 (age 30)
- Place of birth: Stockholm (Sweden)
- Height: 1.84 m (6 ft 0 in)
- Position: Defender

Team information
- Current team: Gangwon FC
- Number: 3

Youth career
- –2015: Vasalunds IF

Senior career*
Years	Team	Apps	(Gls)
2016	Råsunda IS	3	(2)
2017	Eskilstuna City FK	23	(2)
2018–2019	Sollentuna FK	54	(4)
2020	Norrby IF	27	(1)
2021–2022	AFC Eskilstuna	52	(8)
2023–2024	Degerfors IF	41	(3)
2024–2026	MC Oran	52	(1)
2026–	Gangwon FC	0	(0)
- * Club domestic league appearances and goals as of 3 August 2026

Abdelkarim Mammar Chaouche (Arabic: عبد الكريم معمر شاوش; born 21 October 1996), also shortened to Karim Mammar, is a Swedish-َAlgerian footballer who plays as a defender for K League 1 club Gangwon FC.

== Career ==
Being of Algerian and Finnish descent, he grew up in Tensta and started his youth career in Vasalunds IF. He started his senior career as low as Division 6, the eighth tier of Swedish football, for Råsunda IS. Climbing up the ladder with Eskilstuna City FK and third-tier club Sollentuna FK, where he also served as team captain, he moved to Superettan club Norrby IF in 2020.

Mammar returned to Eskilstuna and AFC Eskilstuna, another Superettan club, where he also became team captain. Interest from a couple of Allsvenskan clubs accrued, with Mammar ultimately choosing to move to Degerfors IF. He made his Allsvenskan debut on 2 April 2023 against Hammarby. On 12 July 2024, he joined Algerian club MC Oran.On 19 June 2026, he left the club after two seasons.

On 29 June 2026, Mammar signed with South Korean club Gangwon FC.

== Style of play ==
Mammar is left-footed and plays as a left back or central defender. In 2022, he was noted for scoring six goals despite his defensive position.

== Career statistics ==
As of match played 6 June 2026

Appearances and goals by club, season and competition
Club	Season	League			National cup		Continental		Other		Total	
Club	Season	Division	Apps	Goals	Apps	Goals	Apps	Goals	Apps	Goals	Apps	Goals
Eskilstuna City FK	2017	Swedish Division 2	23	2	0	0	—		—		23	2
Sollentuna FK	2018	Swedish Division 1	29	0	0	0	—		—		29	0
Sollentuna FK	2019	Swedish Division 1	25	4	3	0	—		—		28	4
Sollentuna FK	Total		54	4	3	0	—		—		57	4
Norrby IF	2020	Superettan	27	1	0	0	—		—		27	1
AFC Eskilstuna	2022	Superettan	27	2	3	0	—		—		30	2
AFC Eskilstuna	2022	Superettan	25	6	1	0	—		—		26	6
AFC Eskilstuna	Total		52	8	4	0	—		—		56	8
Degerfors IF	2023	Allsvenskan	28	1	2	0	—		—		30	1
Degerfors IF	2024	Superettan	13	2	4	1	—		—		17	3
Degerfors IF	Total		41	3	6	1	—		—		47	4
MC Oran	2024–25	Algerian Ligue Professionnelle 1	28	1	2	0	—		—		30	1
MC Oran	2025–26	Algerian Ligue Professionnelle 1	24	0	0	0	—		—		24	0
MC Oran	Total		52	1	2	0	—		—		54	1
Gangwon FC	2026	K League 1	0	0	0	0	0 (Note: Appearance(s) in AFC Champions League Elite)	0	—		0	0
Career Total			249	19	15	1	0	0	0	0	264	20
