= Lee You-hyeon =

South Korean footballer (born 1997)

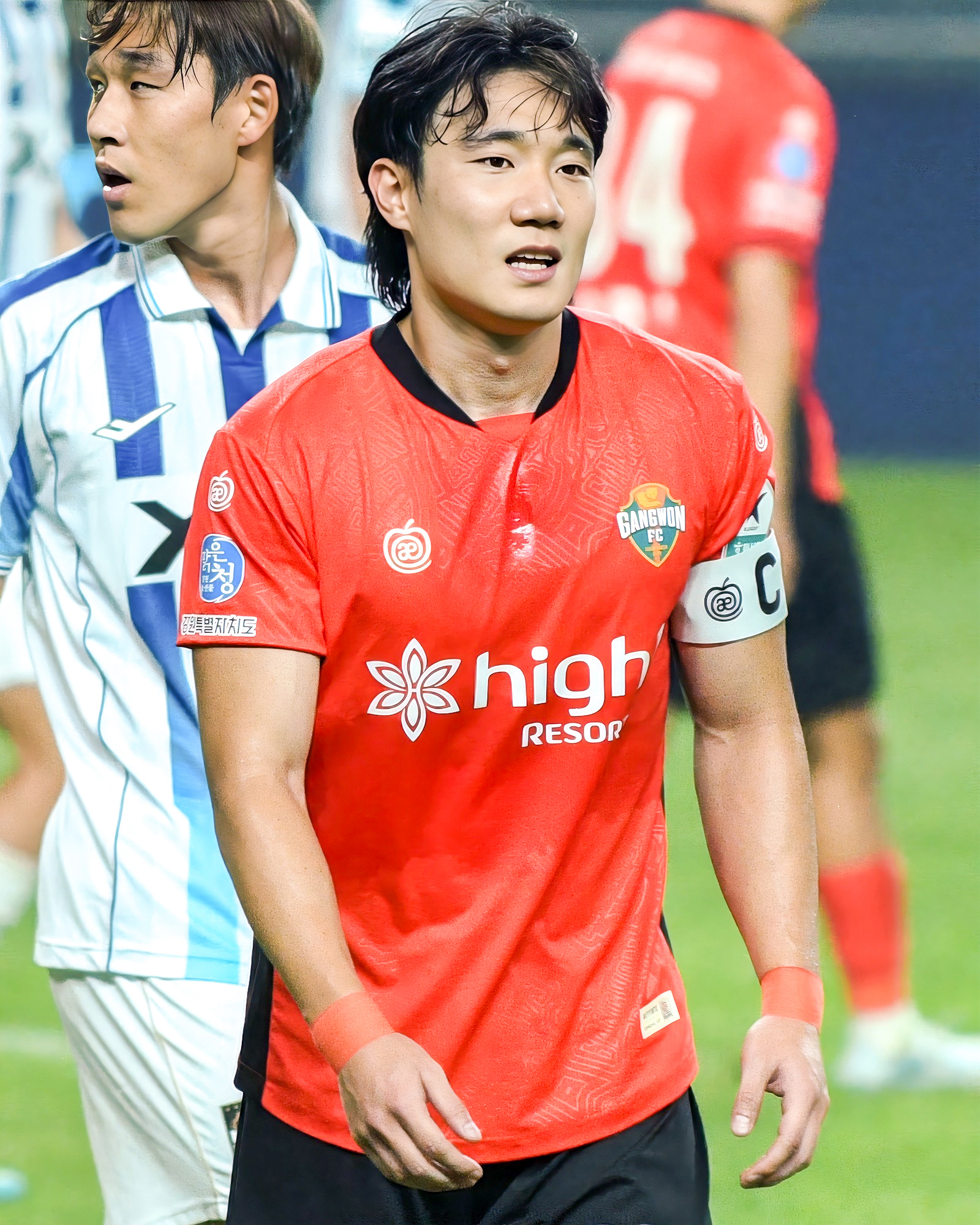
- Lee in 2026

Personal information
- Date of birth: 8 February 1997 (age 29)
- Place of birth: South Korea
- Height: 1.79 m (5 ft 10 in)
- Position: Defender

Team information
- Current team: Gangwon FC
- Number: 97

Youth career
- 2012–2015: Gwangyang Jecheol High School
- 2015–2017: Dankook University

Senior career*
| Years | Team | Apps | (Gls) |
| 2017–2020 | Jeonnam Dragons | 75 | (2) |
| 2021– | Jeonbuk Hyundai Motors | 13 | (0) |
| 2022–2023 | → Gimcheon Sangmu (army) | 29 | (2) |
| 2024 | → Gangwon FC (loan) | 25 | (0) |
| 2025– | Gangwon FC | 48 | (3) |

International career^{‡}
| 2015–2017 | South Korea U-20 | 24 (Note: excludes one appearance against non-national team.) | (2) |
| 2019–2021 | South Korea U-23 | 15 (Note: excludes one appearance against another KFA team.) | (0) |
| 2018– | South Korea | 0 | (0) |
Medal record
Representing South Korea
Men's football
AFC U-23 Championship
| Gold medal – first place | 2020 Thailand |
- * Club domestic league appearances and goals as of 3 August 2026 ‡ National team caps and goals as of 22 July 2021

- Lee You-hyeon
- Hangul: 이유현
- RR: I Yuhyeon
- MR: I Yuhyŏn

Lee You-hyeon (Korean: 이유현; born 8 February 1997) is a South Korean football defender who plays for Gangwon FC and the South Korea national under-23 football team.

== Career statistics ==
=== Club ===
As of 10 November 2024

Appearances and goals by club, season and competition
| Club | Season | League | | | National cup (Note: Includes Korean FA Cup) | | Continental | | Other | | Total | |
| Club | Season | Division | Apps | Goals | Apps | Goals | Apps | Goals | Apps | Goals | Apps | Goals |
|---|---|---|---|---|---|---|---|---|---|---|---|---|
| Jeonnam Dragons | 2017 | K League 1 | 5 | 0 | 0 | 0 | - | | - | | 5 | 0 |
| Jeonnam Dragons | 2018 | K League 1 | 28 | 0 | 1 | 0 | - | | - | | 29 | 0 |
| Jeonnam Dragons | 2019 | K League 2 | 22 | 1 | 0 | 0 | - | | - | | 22 | 1 |
| Jeonnam Dragons | 2020 | K League 2 | 20 | 1 | 1 | 0 | - | | - | | 21 | 1 |
| Jeonnam Dragons | Total | | 75 | 2 | 2 | 0 | — | | – | | 77 | 2 |
| Jeonbuk Hyundai Motors | 2021 | K League 1 | 13 | 0 | 0 | 0 | 1 (Note: Appearances in AFC Champions League) | 0 | - | | 14 | 0 |
| Jeonbuk Hyundai Motors | 2022 | K League 1 | 0 | 0 | 0 | 0 | 4 | 0 | - | | 4 | 0 |
| Jeonbuk Hyundai Motors | Total | | 13 | 0 | 0 | 0 | 5 | 0 | – | | 18 | 0 |
| Gimcheon Sangmu (army) | 2022 | K League 1 | 10 | 0 | - | | - | | 2 (Note: Appearance in K League Promotion-Relegation play-offs) | 0 | 12 | 0 |
| Gimcheon Sangmu (army) | 2023 | K League 2 | 19 | 2 | 1 | 0 | - | | - | | 20 | 2 |
| Gimcheon Sangmu (army) | Total | | 29 | 2 | 1 | 0 | – | | 2 | 0 | 32 | 2 |
| Gangwon FC (loan) | 2024 | K League 1 | 24 | 0 | 1 | 0 | - | | - | | 25 | 0 |
| Career total | | | 141 | 4 | 4 | 0 | 5 | 0 | 2 | 0 | 152 | 4 |

== Honours ==
=== Club ===
Jeonbuk Hyundai Motors

- K League 1 : 2021

Gimcheon Sangmu

- K League 2 : 2023

=== International ===
South Korea U23

- AFC U-23 Championship: 2020
