= Park Sang-hyeok (footballer, born 2002) =

South Korean footballer

Personal information
- Date of birth: 13 June 2002 (age 24)
- Place of birth: Miryang, Gyeongnam, South Korea
- Height: 1.87 m (6 ft 2 in)
- Position: Forward

Team information
- Current team: Gangwon FC
- Number: 19

Youth career
- 2018–2020: Taesung High School

Senior career*
Years	Team	Apps	(Gls)
2021–2023	Gangwon FC B	27	(12)
2021–	Gangwon FC	64	(7)
2024–2025	→ Gimcheon Sangmu (draft)	50	(14)
- * Club domestic league appearances and goals as of 3 August 2026

Park Sang-hyeok (Korean: 박상혁; born 13 June 2002) is a South Korean professional footballer who plays as a forward for K League 1 side Gangwon FC.

== Club career ==
Park signed a rookie contract with Gangwon FC in 2021.

He began his military service by enlisting in Gimcheon Sangmu in 2024.

== Style of play ==
Park has a decent physique at 1.87 m tall and is excellent at post play pressure and linking up.

== Career statistics ==
=== Club ===
As of match played 29 October 2025

Appearances and goals by club, season and competition
Club	Season	League			Cup		Continental		Other		Total	
Club	Season	Division	Apps	Goals	Apps	Goals	Apps	Goals	Apps	Goals	Apps	Goals
Gangwon FC B	2021	K4 League	10	7	—		—		—		10	7
Gangwon FC B	2022	K4 League	13	4	—		—		—		13	4
Gangwon FC B	2023	K4 League	4	1	—		—		—		4	1
Gangwon FC B	Total		27	12	0	0	0	0	0	0	27	12
Gangwon FC	2021	K League 1	16	0	1	0	—		1 (Note: Appearance in K League promotion-relegation play-offs)	0	18	0
Gangwon FC	2022	K League 1	4	0	0	0	—		—		4	0
Gangwon FC	2023	K League 1	24	4	3	0	—		1	0	28	4
Gangwon FC	2025	K League 1	0	0	0	0	0	0	—		0	0
Gangwon FC	Total		44	4	4	0	0	0	2	0	50	4
Gimcheon Sangmu (draft)	2024	K League 1	17	4	0	0	—		—		17	4
Gimcheon Sangmu (draft)	2025	K League 1	33	10	0	0	—		—		33	10
Gimcheon Sangmu (draft)	Total		50	14	0	0	0	0	0	0	50	14
Career total			121	30	4	0	0	0	2	0	127	30
