= Abdallah Hleihel =

Israeli footballer

Personal information
- Full name: Abdallah Hleihel
- Date of birth: 11 January 2001 (age 25)
- Place of birth: Jish, Israel
- Height: 1.85 m (6 ft 1 in)
- Position: Forward

Team information
- Current team: Gangwon FC
- Number: 77

Youth career
- 2013–2019: Ironi Kiryat Shmona

Senior career*
Years	Team	Apps	(Gls)
2019–2021	Ironi Kiryat Shmona	31	(7)
2021–2022	Al-Nasr	3	(0)
2022	→ Hapoel Nof HaGalil (loan)	9	(2)
2022–2023	F.C. Kafr Qasim	9	(0)
2023	Hapoel Ashdod	15	(1)
2023–2025	Bnei Sakhnin	26	(3)
2025–2026	Dila Gori	12	(5)
2026–	Gangwon FC	21	(7)

International career^{‡}
2017	Israel U17	4	(0)
2020–	Israel U18	2	(1)
2020	Israel U19	3	(0)
- * Club domestic league appearances and goals as of 3 August 2026 ‡ National team caps and goals as of 1 June 2021 (UTC)

Abdallah Hleihel (Arabic: عبد الله حليحل, Hebrew: עבדאללה חליחל; born 11 January 2001) is an Israeli footballer who plays as a forward for Gangwon FC in K League 1, the top flight league in South Korea.

== Career ==
Hleihel was born in Jish.

Hleihel made his professional debut for Ironi Kiryat Shmona in the Israeli Premier League on 28 December 2019, in the home match against Maccabi Haifa, which finished as a 1–2 loss, then he also scored his debut goal.

On 23 January 2026 Hleihel signed with K League 1 club Gangwon FC.

== Career statistics ==
=== Club ===
As of match played 11 August 2026

Appearances and goals by club, season and competition
Club	Season	League			National cup		League cup		Continental		Other		Total	
Club	Season	Division	Apps	Goals	Apps	Goals	Apps	Goals	Apps	Goals	Apps	Goals	Apps	Goals
Ironi Kiryat Shmona	2019–20	Israeli Premier League	8	3	—		—		—		—		8	3
Ironi Kiryat Shmona	2020–21	Israeli Premier League	23	4	1	0	0	0	—		—		24	4
Ironi Kiryat Shmona	Total		31	7	1	0	0	0	—		—		32	7
Al-Nasr	2021–22	UAE Pro League	3	0	0	0	1	0	—		—		4	0
Hapoel Nof HaGalil (loan)	2021–22	Israeli Premier League	9	1	—		—		—		—		9	1
F.C. Kafr Qasim	2022–23	Liga Leumit	9	0	1	0	0	0	—		—		10	0
Hapoel Ashdod	2022–23	Liga Leumit	15	1	—		—		—		—		15	1
Bnei Sakhnin	2023–24	Israeli Premier League	5	1	0	0	—		—		—		5	1
Bnei Sakhnin	2024–25	Israeli Premier League	21	2	3	1	5	3	—		—		29	6
Bnei Sakhnin	Total		26	3	3	1	5	3	—		—		34	7
Dila Gori	2025	Erovnuli Liga	12	5	3	0	—		—		—		15	5
Gangwon FC	2026	K League 1	21	7	0	0	—		4 (Note: Appearance(s) in AFC Champions League Elite)	0	—		25	7
Career Total			126	24	8	1	6	3	4	0	0	0	144	28
