= Choe Byeong-chan =

South Korean footballer (born 1996)

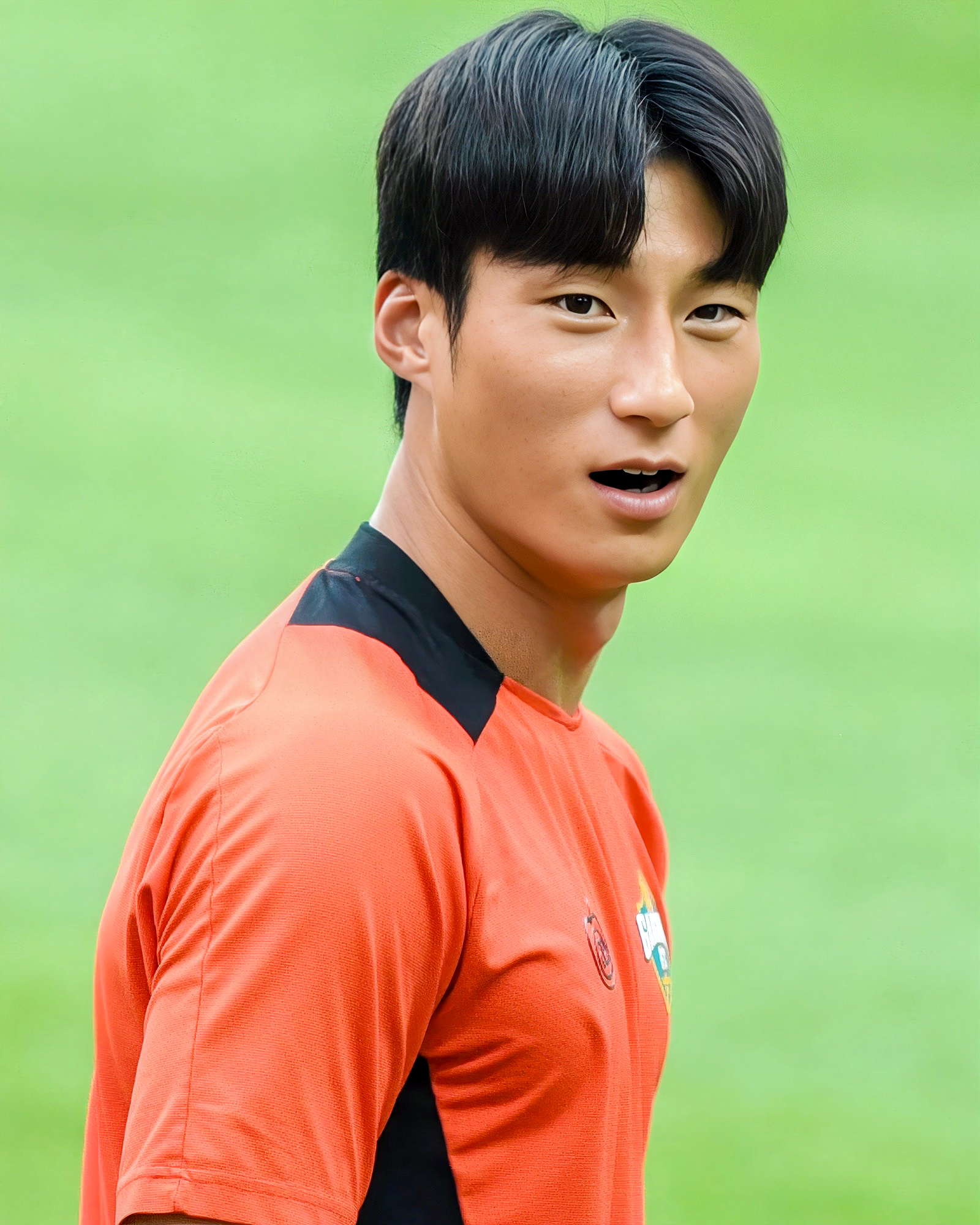
- Choe in 2026

Personal information
- Full name: Choe Byeong-chan
- Date of birth: 4 April 1996 (age 30)
- Place of birth: South Korea
- Height: 5 ft 9 in (1.75 m)
- Position: Midfielder

Team information
- Current team: Gangwon FC
- Number: 96

Senior career*
Years	Team	Apps	(Gls)
2018–2020	Seongnam	45	(6)
2020-2024	Bucheon FC 1995	35	(1)
2022-2023	→ Gimcheon Sangmu (Military service)	18	(4)
2025-	Gangwon FC	27	(2)
- * Club domestic league appearances and goals as of 3 August 2026

Choe Byeong-chan (Korean: 최병찬; born 4 April 1996) is a South Korean professional footballer who plays as a midfielder for K League 1 side Gangwon FC.

== Club career ==
Choe made his professional debut for Seongnam in the K League 2 on 1 April 2018 against Chungnam Asan. He started and played 42 minutes before being substituted off as Seongnam won 1–0. He then scored his first professional goal a month later on 12 May against Gwangju. His 39th-minute goal was the second in a 3–1 victory. Choe then scored a brace for Seongnam on 30 June 2018 during a 2–1 victory over Bucheon 1995.

Choe scored his first goal in the first division K League 1 on 19 May 2019 in a 2–1 defeat against Gangwon.

== Career statistics ==
=== Club ===
As of match played 17 May 2020

Appearances and goals by club, season and competition
Club	Season	League			Cup		Continental		Total	
Club	Season	Division	Apps	Goals	Apps	Goals	Apps	Goals	Apps	Goals
Seongnam	2018	K League 2	19	5	0	0	—	—	19	5
Seongnam	2019	K League 1	24	1	0	0	—	—	24	1
Seongnam	2020	K League 1	2	0	0	0	—	—	2	0
Career total			45	6	0	0	0	0	45	6
