= Marko Tući =

Montenegrin footballer (born 1998)

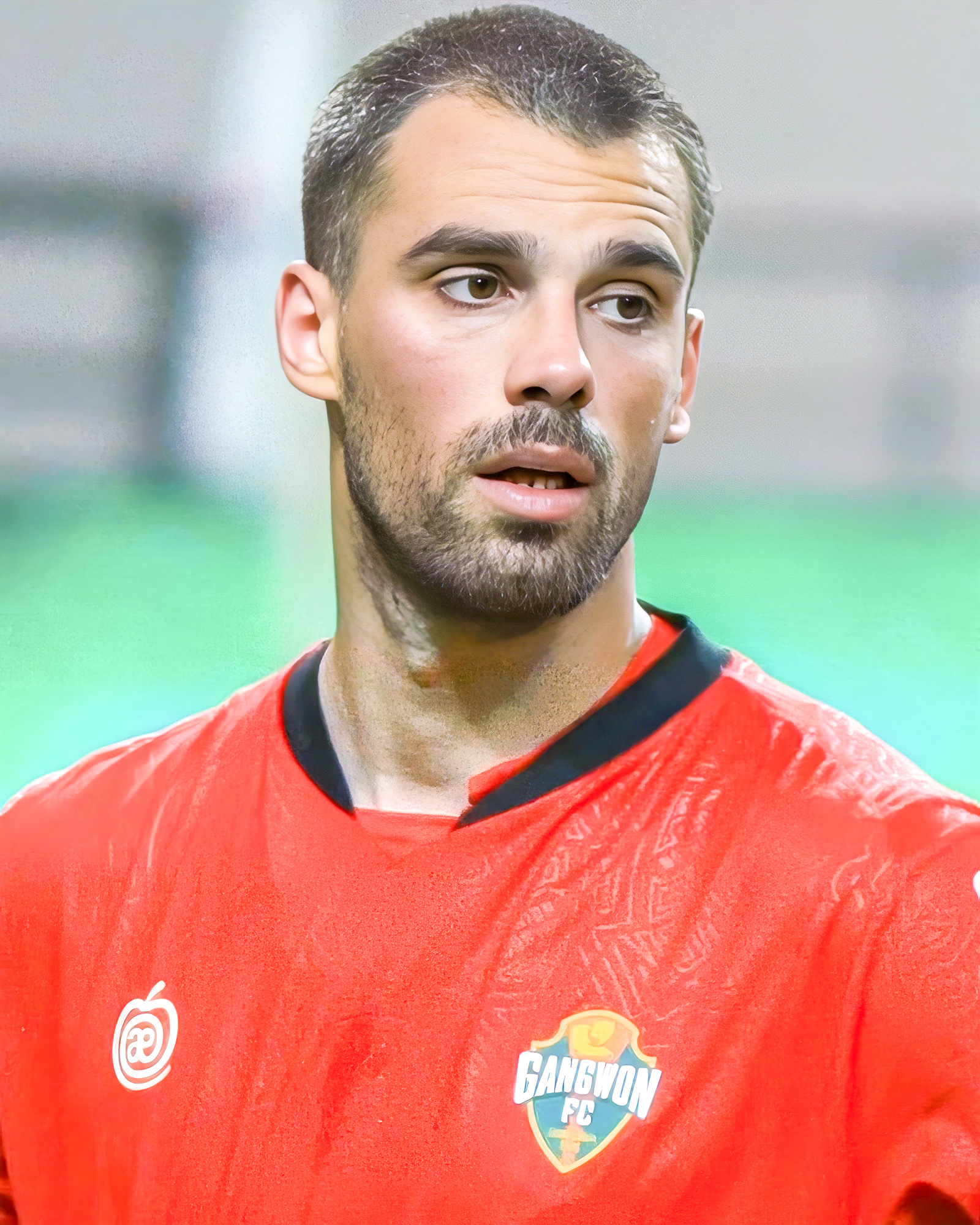
- Tući in 2026

Personal information
- Date of birth: 4 December 1998 (age 27)
- Place of birth: Podgorica, FR Yugoslavia
- Height: 1.90 m (6 ft 3 in)
- Position: Centre back

Team information
- Current team: Gangwon FC
- Number: 74

Senior career*
Years	Team	Apps	(Gls)
2017–2018	Budućnost	0	(0)
2018	→ Jezero (loan)	9	(0)
2018–2020	Podgorica	20	(3)
2019–2020	→ Dečić (loan)	25	(4)
2020–2023	Dečić	91	(6)
2023–	Gangwon	98	(4)

International career^{‡}
2022–	Montenegro	10	(1)
- * Club domestic league appearances and goals as of 3 August 2026 ‡ National team caps and goals as of 4 January 2026

Marko Tući (Albanian: Marko Tuçi; born 4 December 1998) is a Montenegrin professional footballer who plays for K League 1 club Gangwon FC and the Montenegro national team as a centre-back.

== Career ==
=== Gangwon ===
On 27 June 2023, Tuçi signed for the South Korean club Gangwon which competes in the K League.

== Personal life ==
Marko Tuci was born in Podgorica to Albanian parents.

== Career statistics ==
=== Club ===
As of match played 11 August 2026

Appearances and goals by club, season and competition
Club	Season	League			National cup		Continental		Other		Total	
Club	Season	Division	Apps	Goals	Apps	Goals	Apps	Goals	Apps	Goals	Apps	Goals
Budućnost	2017–18	Montenegrin First League	0	0	0	0	—		—		0	0
Jezero (loan)	2017–18	Montenegrin Second League	9	0	—		—		—		9	0
Podgorica	2018–19	Montenegrin Second League	20	3	1	0	—		—		21	3
Dečić (loan)	2019–20	Montenegrin Second League	25	4	0	0	—		—		25	4
Dečić	2020–21	Montenegrin First League	32	1	4	0	—		—		36	1
Dečić	2021–22	Montenegrin First League	32	3	4	0	2 (Note: Appearance(s) in UEFA Conference League)	0	—		38	3
Dečić	2022–23	Montenegrin First League	27	2	3	0	2	0	—		32	2
Dečić	Total		116	10	11	0	4	0	—		131	10
Gangwon FC	2023	K League 1	16	1	0	0	—		2 (Note: Appearance(s) in K League 1 relegation playoff)	0	18	1
Gangwon FC	2024	K League 1	32	1	0	0	—		—		32	1
Gangwon FC	2025	K League 1	31	0	1	0	3 (Note: Appearance(s) in AFC Champions League Elite)	0	—		35	0
Gangwon FC	2026	K League 1	17	2	0	0	4	0	—		21	2
Gangwon FC	Total		96	4	1	0	7	0	2	0	106	4
Career Total			241	17	13	0	11	0	2	0	267	17

=== International ===
As of match played 17 November 2025

Appearances and goals by national team and year
National team	Year	Apps	Goals
Montenegro	2022	1	0
Montenegro	2023	2	0
Montenegro	2024	3	0
Montenegro	2025	4	1
Total		10	1

Scores and results list Montenegro's goal tally first, score column indicates score after each Tući goal.

List of international goals scored by Marko Tući
No.	Date	Venue	Opponent	Score	Result	Competition	Ref.
1	22 March 2025	Gradski stadion, Nikšić, Montenegro	Gibraltar	2–1	3–1	2026 FIFA World Cup qualification	
