= Gangwon FC =

South Korean football club

- Full name: Gangwon Football Club 강원도민프로축구단
- Founded: 2008; 18 years ago
- Ground: Chuncheon Songam Sports Town; Gangneung Stadium
- Owner: Gangwon Province Government
- Chairman: Woo Sang-ho (Governor of Gangwon)
- Manager: Chung Kyung-ho
- League: K League 1
- 2025: K League 1, 5th of 12
- Website: gangwon-fc.com
Home colours	Away colours

Gangwon FC (Korean: 강원 FC) is a South Korean football club based in Gangwon Province. They joined the K League as its 15th club for the 2009 season. The club is sponsored by High1 Resort.

== History ==
Gangwon Province's governor Kim Jin-sun announced a schedule for the foundation of the 15th professional football club to participate in the K League on 28 April 2008. A committee, the "Foundation of Football Club in Gangwon Preparation Committee", was organized on 18 June 2008 to facilitate the foundation. Preparations had advanced enough that by 17 November 2008, 14 players had joined Gangwon FC in its first nomination. On 20 November 2008, Gangwon FC organized its first full squad, totaling 23 players, including nine from the 2009 K League draft. Gangwon FC was formally founded on 18 December 2008, in time to participate in the 2009 edition of the K League.

Gangwon FC played its first ever K League match against Jeju United on 8 March 2009, at Gangneung Stadium, winning 1–0 with a decisive goal from Yoon Jun-ha. The team continued their winning start with a further four victories on the trot and causing a sensation in the first half of the 2009 K League season. Gangwon was unable to maintain their initial success, and by round 19 had fallen into the lower half of the league table. By the conclusion of their first season in the K League, they placed 13th among 15 clubs.

In the 2009 Korean FA Cup, Gangwon entered the competition in the round of 32 and defeated their first opponent Incheon Korail FC in a penalty shoot-out after a 2–2 draw. They then faced the Chunnam Dragons, losing 1–0. In the 2009 Korean League Cup, Gangwon finished bottom of their group with only a single win (against Daejeon Citizen).

Gangwon FC had a difficult season in 2010, even though first striker Kim Young-hoo scored 13 goals in the league. The club finished 12th out of 15 clubs. The 2011 season was the worst since the club's establishment. Gangwon finished last in the league, with the entire team scoring only 14 goals in thirty matches.

In the 2012 season, K League imposed a new promotion-relegation structure: bottom two teams in the top-tier league were to be relegated to second division. In the 43rd round, Gangwon managed to remain in the top-tier with Baek Jong-hwan's decisive goal that won the away game against Seongnam Ilhwa, avoiding relegation by one point.

In the 2013 season of K League Classic, the first season in which K League implemented automatic relegation of the bottom two teams and the third from the bottom team having to play in the promotion-relegation playoffs against the champion of the K League Challenge, Gangwon finished the season third from last and subsequently relegated to the K League Challenge after losing to Sangju Sangmu Phoenix over two legs in the playoffs.

Halfway through the 2018 season, on 12 August 2018, Kim Byung-soo was appointed as new head coach, leading the club to eighth place in the K League 1.

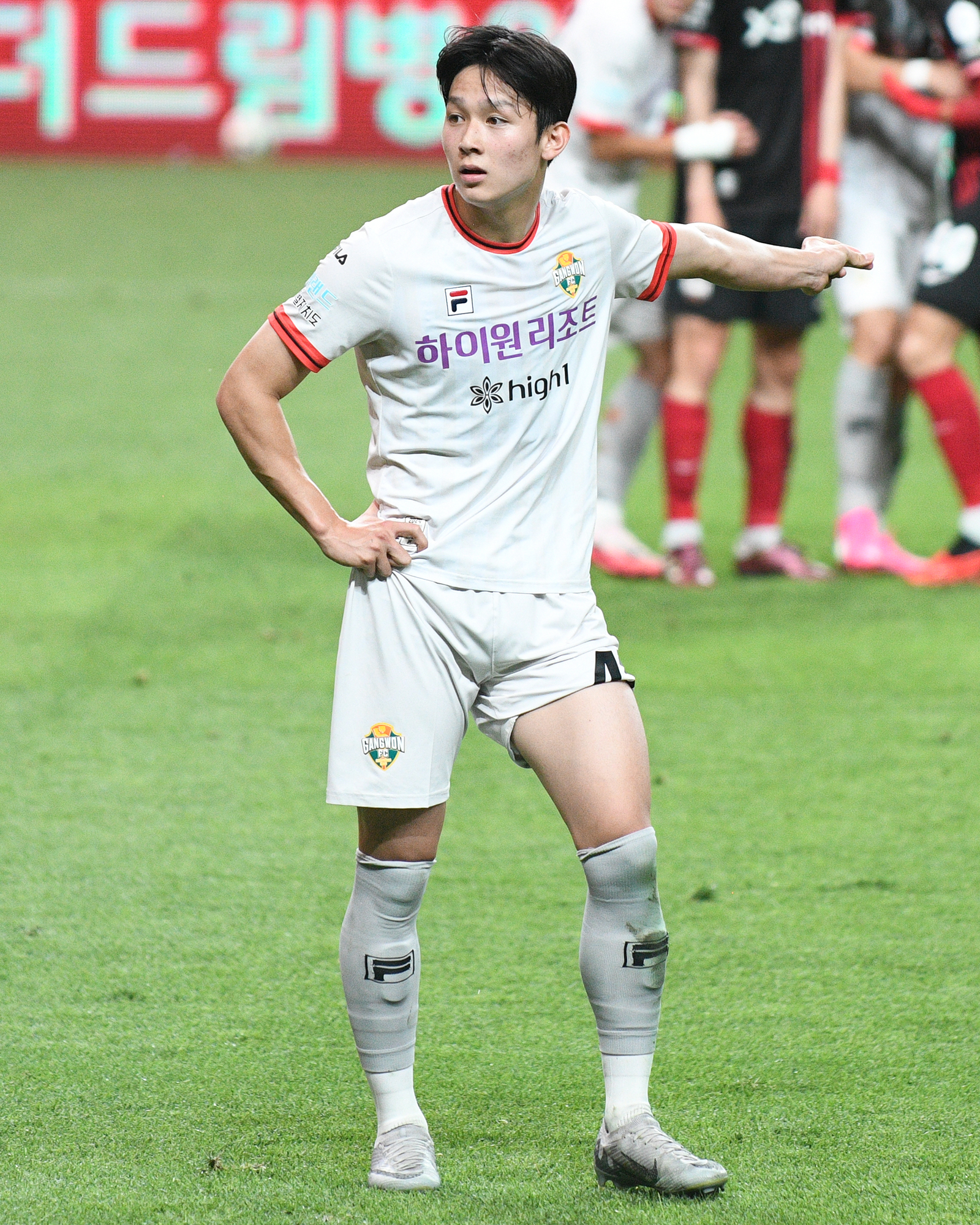
Winger Yang Min-hyeok became the club's record sale in 2024

The following season, Kim Ji-hyeon was awarded K League Young Player of the Year, as Gangwon finished sixth in the league table. In his first full campaign in 2019, manager Kim Byung-soo earned praise for pushing an entertaining brand of football dubbed "Byung-soo ball." That year, Gangwon led the K League in ball possession, pass attempts, pass completion percentage and forward pass completion percentage, while finishing third in goals.

Focusing on defensive reinforcements prior to the 2020 season, which was the team's main weaknesses the previous season, Kim Byung-soo recruited Lim Chai-min, Shin Se-gye and Kim Young-bin, among others. With a 2–1 victory at home against Seongnam on 4 October 2020, Gangwon secured the top spot in the Final B and secured survival in the K League 1.

In the lead-up to the 2021 season, players such as Masatoshi Ishida, who had been a mainstay of Suwon the season before, Sin Chang-moo, who was at the heart of Daegu's attack, and national team players Yun Suk-young, Rim Chang-woo and Uzbekistani player Rustam Ashurmatov were recruited. On 21 March 2021, they won their home game against Incheon United with a 2–0 victory to make it their first win in the first six games of the season. On 3 November 2021, in serious danger of suffering relegation to the K League 2 after a humiliating 4–0 loss against Pohang Steelers, Kim Byung-soo was removed from his position. Under his successor, Choi Yong-soo, Gangwon managed to stay up in the top division after beating Daejeon Hana Citizen over two legs in the relegation play-offs.

In the 2024 K League 1 season, the club achieved a record-high ranking after finishing as league runners-up behind champions Ulsan HD and qualified for the 2025–26 AFC Champions League Elite. The impressive performance of Gangwon was in part thanks to K League Young Player of the Year Award winner Yang Min-hyeok, who was signed by Tottenham Hotspur after the season.

== Stadiums and facilities ==
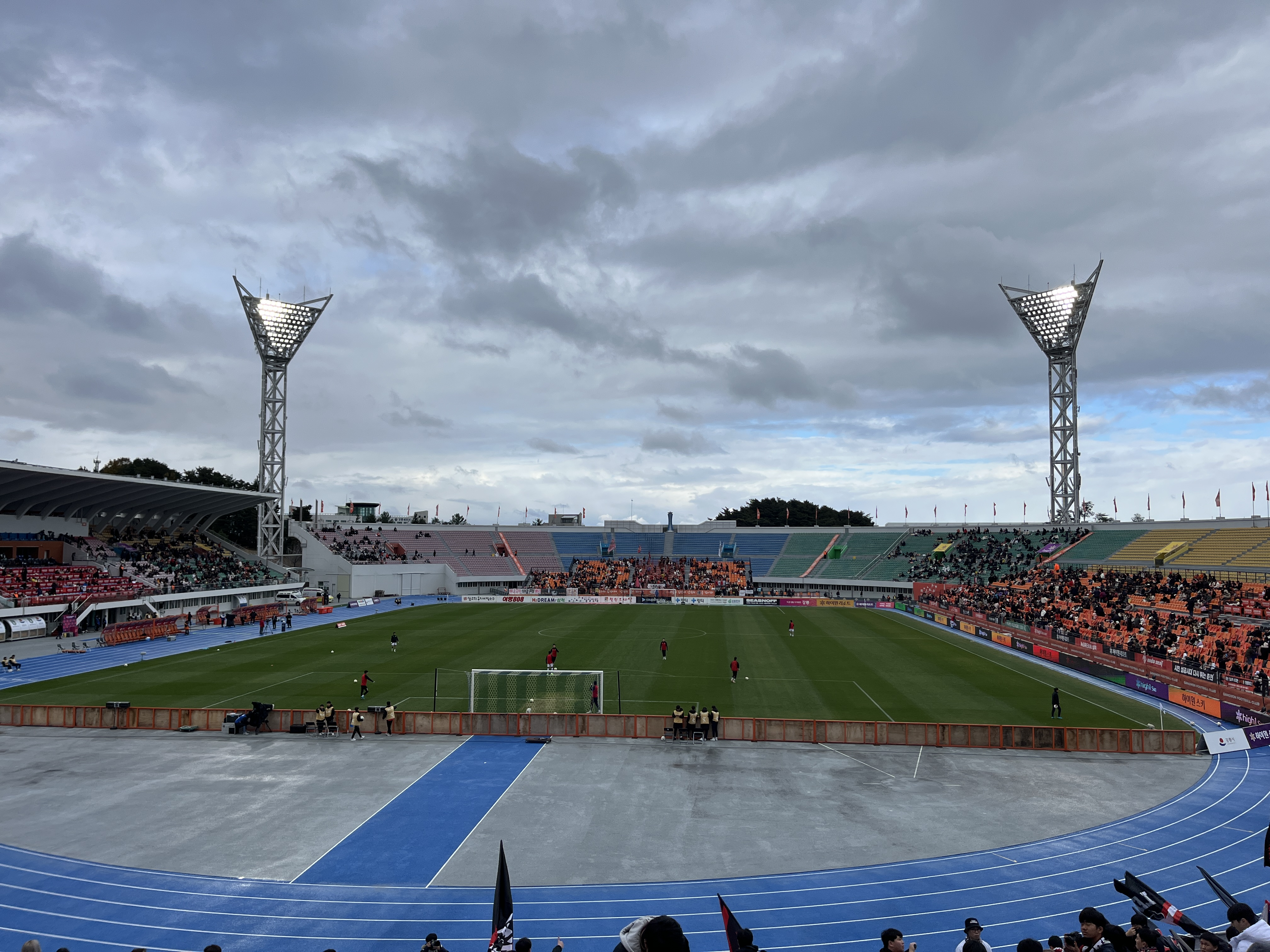
Gangneung Stadium is one of the two stadiums used by Gangwon FC

Gangwon has two home stadiums: Gangneung Stadium (known as the Gangneung High1 Arena for sponsorship reasons) in the coastal city of Gangneung, and Chuncheon Songam Stadium in Chuncheon, the capital of Gangwon Province.

The club's training ground, called the Orange House, is in Gangneung.

== Players ==
=== Current squad ===
As of 14 October 2026

Note: Flags indicate national team as defined under FIFA eligibility rules; some limited exceptions apply. Players may hold more than one non-FIFA nationality.

No.	Pos.	Nation	Player
1	GK	KOR	Park Chung-hyo
3	DF	KOR	Jung Seung-bin
4	MF	KOR	Seo Min-woo (vice-captain)
5	DF	SWE	Abdelkarim Mammar
6	MF	KOR	Kim Dong-hyun
7	FW	KOR	Kim Dae-won
8	MF	KOR	Lee Seung-won
9	FW	KOR	Kim Gun-hee
10	FW	KOR	Mo Jae-hyeon (vice-captain)
11	FW	KOR	Goh Young-jun (on loan from Górnik Zabrze)
13	DF	KOR	Lee Gi-hyuk (vice-captain)
14	MF	KOR	Kang Yun-gu
15	FW	KOR	Jin Jun-seo
16	MF	KOR	Kim Tae-hwan
17	FW	KOR	Lee Eun-ho
19	FW	KOR	Park Sang-hyeok
21	GK	KOR	Kim Jung-hoon
22	FW	KOR	Yoo Byung-heon
23	DF	MNE	Marko Tući
24	DF	KOR	Park Ho-young
25	DF	KOR	Lee Hyo-bin
26	FW	KOR	Jo Won-woo
27	DF	KOR	Kim Do-hyun
29	DF	KOR	Choi Jae-hyeok
30	MF	KOR	Yeo Jun-yeop

No.	Pos.	Nation	Player
31	GK	KOR	Hong Jin-hyeok
33	DF	KOR	Hong Chul
37	DF	KOR	Kwon Seok-joo
38	DF	KOR	Ko Eun-seok
39	FW	KOR	Lee Ji-ho
40	MF	KOR	Won Hui-do
41	GK	KOR	Kim Yu-seong
42	MF	KOR	Kim Tae-hyeok
45	DF	KOR	Lee Jung-hyun
46	DF	KOR	Kim Eo-jin
47	DF	KOR	Shin Min-ha
51	GK	KOR	Cho Min-kyu
57	MF	KOR	Lee Yong-jae
61	MF	KOR	Kim Seul-gi
66	MF	KOR	Hwang Eun-chong
70	FW	NGR	Jesse Sekidika
71	DF	KOR	Kang Seong-yun
74	FW	KOR	Choi Ji-nam
75	MF	KOR	Kim Yi-seok
77	FW	ISR	Abdallah Hleihel
88	DF	KOR	Hwang Mun-ki
96	FW	KOR	Choe Byeong-chan
97	MF	KOR	Lee You-hyeon (captain)
99	DF	KOR	Kang Jun-hyuk

=== Out on loan ===
Note: Flags indicate national team as defined under FIFA eligibility rules; some limited exceptions apply. Players may hold more than one non-FIFA nationality.

No.	Pos.	Nation	Player
—	DF	KOR	Jo Hyun-tae (at Daegu FC)
—	DF	KOR	Song Jun-seok (at Gimcheon Sangmu for military service)
—	MF	KOR	Kim Kang-gook (at Jincheon HR for military service)

No.	Pos.	Nation	Player
—	FW	CRO	Mario Ćuže (at Zrinjski Mostar)
—	FW	KOR	Kim Hyeong-jin (at Dangjin Citizen)
—	FW	KOR	Lee Sang-heon (at Gimcheon Sangmu for military service)

=== Captains ===
Season	Captain
2009	(South Korea) Lee Eul-yong
2010–11	(South Korea) Chung Kyung-ho
2011	(South Korea) Seo Dong-hyeon
2011	(South Korea) Lee Eul-yong
2012	(South Korea) Kim Eun-jung
2013	(South Korea) Chun Jae-ho
2014	(South Korea) Kim Oh-gyu
2015	(South Korea) Hwang Kyo-chung (South Korea) Baek Jong-hwan
2016–17	(South Korea) Baek Jong-hwan
2018	(South Korea) Jung Jo-gook
2019–20	(South Korea) Oh Beom-seok
2020–21	(South Korea) Lim Chai-min
2022	(South Korea) Kim Dong-hyun
2023	(South Korea) Rim Chang-woo
2024	(South Korea) Han Kook-young (South Korea) Yun Suk-young
2025	(South Korea) Kim Dong-hyun (South Korea) Lee You-hyeon
2026	(South Korea) Lee You-hyeon

== Youth team ==
On 13 September 2010, Gangwon FC U-12 team was established in Gangneung. On 2 November 2011, Gangwon FC made an agreement with Gangneung Jeil High School (under-18 team) and Jumunjin Middle School (under-15 team).

On 1 February 2021, it was officially announced that Gangwon would be the first fully professional team to found a reserve team set to play in the semi-professional K4 League, in order to give their youth players and/or other registered members of the senior team more playing time. The main condition for them would be to have at least seven out of eleven players in the starting formation aged 23 or younger. Lee Seul-gi, who had previously served as first-team coach for Gangwon, was appointed as the manager of the newly established U23 squad.

== Coaching staff and executive office ==
Coaching staff

- Manager: (South Korea) Chung Kyung-ho
- Assistant manager: (South Korea) Park Yong-ho
- First-team coach: (South Korea) Choi Hyo-jin, (South Korea) Song Chang-ho
- Goalkeeping coach: (South Korea) Jeon Sang-wook
- Reserve team coach: (South Korea) Oh Beom-seok
- Reserve team goalkeeping coach: (South Korea) Kim Min-sik
- Physical coach: (South Korea) Jang Seok-min, (South Korea) Byun Ju-won
- Tactical coach: (South Korea) Jang Young-hoon
- Data/video analyst: (South Korea) Kim Ju-young

Executive office

- Chairman: Gangwon Province governor
- President
  - (South Korea) Kim Won-dong (11 November 2008 – 22 July 2011)
  - (South Korea) Nam Jong-hyun (22 August 2011 – 19 September 2012)
  - (South Korea) Kim Deok-rae (caretaker) (14 December 2012 – 28 May 2013)
  - (South Korea) Im Eun-ju (29 May 2013 – 31 December 2015)
  - (South Korea) Jo Tae-ryong (4 March 2016 – 30 October 2018)
  - (South Korea) Han Won-seok (caretaker) (31 October 2018 – 31 December 2018)
  - (South Korea) Park Jong-wan (1 January 2019 – 31 December 2020)
  - (South Korea) Lee Young-pyo (1 January 2021 – 31 December 2022)
  - (South Korea) Kim Byung-ji (1 January 2023 – present)

== Managers ==
No.	Name	From	To	Season(s)
1	(South Korea) Choi Soon-ho	2008/11/16	2011/04/06	2009–2011
2	(South Korea) Kim Sang-ho	2011/04/07	2012/07/01	2011–2012
3	(South Korea) Kim Hak-bum	2012/07/09	2013/08/11	2012–2013
4	(South Korea) Kim Yong-kab	2013/08/14	2013/12/10	2013
5	(Brazil) Arthur Bernardes	2013/12/23	2014/09/18	2014
C	(South Korea) Park Hyo-jin	2014/09/18	2014/12/24	2014
6	(South Korea) Choi Yun-kyum	2015/01/05	2017/08/14	2015–2017
C	(South Korea) Park Hyo-jin	2017/08/14	2017/11/04	2017
7	(South Korea) Song Kyung-sub	2017/11/02	2018/08/11	2017–2018
8	(South Korea) Kim Byung-soo	2018/08/12	2021/11/04	2018–2021
9	(South Korea) Choi Yong-soo	2021/11/16	2023/06/14	2021–2023
10	(South Korea) Yoon Jong-hwan	2023/06/19	2024/12/06	2023–2024
11	(South Korea) Chung Kyung-ho	2024/12/06	present	2025–

== Honours ==
League

- K League 1
  - Runners-up (1): 2024

== Season-by-season records ==
=== Domestic record ===
Season	League										Cup	Other
Season	Division	GP	W	D	L	GF	GA	GD	Pts	Pos.	Cup	Other
2009	1	28	7	7	14	42	57	–15	28	13	R16	League Cup: GS
2010	1	28	8	6	14	36	50	–14	30	12	R32	League Cup: GS
2011	1	30	3	6	21	14	45	–31	15	16	QF	League Cup: GS
2012	1	44	14	7	23	57	68	–11	49	14	R16	
2013	1	38	8	12	18	37	64	–27	36	12↓	R16	
2014	2	36	16	6	14	48	50	–2	54	3	QF	
2015	2	40	13	12	15	64	56	+8	51	7	R16	
2016	2	40	19	9	12	50	33	+17	66	4↑	R32	
2017	1	38	13	10	15	59	65	–6	49	6	R16	
2018	1	38	12	10	16	56	60	–4	46	8	R32	
2019	1	38	14	8	16	56	58	–2	50	6	QF	
2020	1	27	9	7	11	36	41	–5	34	7	QF	
2021	1	38	10	13	15	40	51	–11	43	11	SF	
2022	1	38	14	7	17	50	52	–2	49	6	R16	
2023	1	38	6	16	16	30	41	–11	34	10	QF	
2024	1	38	19	7	12	62	56	+6	64	2	R16	
2025	1	38	13	13	12	37	41	–4	52	5	SF	

Key

- SF = Semi-final
- QF = Quarter-final
- R16 = Round of 16
- R32 = Round of 32
- GS = Group stage

=== Continental record ===
All results list Gangwon's goal tally first.

==== AFC Champions League Elite ====
Season	Round	Opposition	Home	Away	Agg.
2025–26	League stage	(China) Shanghai Shenhua	2–1	—N/a	8th out of 12
2025–26	League stage	(China) Chengdu Rongcheng	—N/a	0–1	8th out of 12
2025–26	League stage	(Japan) Vissel Kobe	4–3	—N/a	8th out of 12
2025–26	League stage	(Japan) Sanfrecce Hiroshima	—N/a	0–1	8th out of 12
2025–26	League stage	(Japan) Machida Zelvia	1–3	—N/a	8th out of 12
2025–26	League stage	(Thailand) Buriram United	—N/a	2–2	8th out of 12
2025–26	League stage	(China) Shanghai Port	0–0	—N/a	8th out of 12
2025–26	League stage	(Australia) Melbourne City	—N/a	0–0	8th out of 12
2025–26	Round of 16	(Japan) Machida Zelvia	0–0	0–1	0–1
2026–27	Preliminary round	(Japan) Gamba Osaka	0–1 (a.e.t.)	—N/a	—N/a

==== AFC Champions League Two ====
Season	Round	Opposition	Home	Away	Agg.
2026–27	Group H	(Hong Kong) Kitchee		0–0	
2026–27	Group H	(Cambodia) Phnom Penh Crown	1–2		
2026–27	Group H	(Malaysia) Kuching City	1–0	0–2	
