= 2025 Gangwon FC season =

Gangwon FC
2025 season
- Manager: Chung Kyung-ho
- K League 1: 5th
- Korea Cup: Semifinals
- Champions League Elite: League stage
- Top goalscorer: League: Kim Gun-hee (5); Mo Jae-hyeon (5); All: Kim Gun-hee (7); Mo Jae-hyeon (7)
- Highest home attendance: 10,231 v FC Seoul; 15 March 2025, K League 1
- Lowest home attendance: 3,107 v Siheung Citizen; 14 May 2025, Korea Cup
- Average home league attendance: 7,078
- Biggest win: 3–0 v Jeju SK FC; 6 May 2025, K League 1; 3–0 v Daegu FC; 21 June 2025, K League 1
- Biggest defeat: 0–4 v Gimcheon Sangmu; 11 May 2025, K League 1
Home colours	Away colours

The 2025 season is the 17th season of Gangwon FC and the club's 14th season in the K League 1. Gangwon FC is competing in K League 1, Korea Cup and Champions League Elite.

This is Gangwon FC's first season under new head coach Chung Kyung-ho, who was assistant manager and announced as Yoon Jong-hwan's replacement on 6 December 2024.

== Coaching staff ==
- Manager: (South Korea) Chung Kyung-ho
- Assistant manager: (South Korea) Park Yong-ho
- First-team coach: (South Korea) Choi Hyo-jin, (South Korea) Song Chang-ho
- Goalkeeping coach: (South Korea) Jeon Sang-wook
- Reserve-team coach : (South Korea) Oh Beom-seok
- Reserve-team goalkeeping coach: (South Korea) Kim Min-sik
- Physical coach: (South Korea) Jang Seok-min, Byun Ju-won
- Tactical coach : (South Korea) Jang Young-hoon
- Data/Video Analyst : (South Korea) Kim Ju-young

== Current squad ==
No.	Player	Nationality	Position(s)	Date of birth (age)
Goalkeepers
1	Lee Gwang-yeon	South Korea	GK	11 September 1999 (aged 26)
21	Park Cheong-hyo	South Korea	GK	13 February 1990 (aged 35)
31	Hong Jin-hyeok	South Korea	GK	16 March 2004 (aged 21)
41	Kim Yu-seong	South Korea	GK	16 November 2005 (aged 20)
71	Cho Min-kyu	South Korea	GK	30 April 2003 (aged 22)
Defenders
3	Bruno Oliveira	Brazil	CB	9 June 1996 (aged 29)
13	Lee Ki-hyuk	South Korea	CB / CM	7 July 2000 (aged 25)
20	Jo Hyun-tae	South Korea	CB	27 October 2004 (aged 21)
23	Marko Tući	Montenegro	CB	4 December 1998 (aged 27)
24	Park Ho-young	South Korea	CB	7 April 1999 (aged 26)
25	Choi Jeong-hoon	South Korea	LB	9 March 1999 (aged 26)
27	Kim Do-hyun	South Korea	RB / RWB / RW	12 February 2000 (aged 25)
33	Hong Chul	South Korea	LB	17 September 1990 (aged 35)
34	Song Jun-seok	South Korea	LB	6 February 2001 (aged 24)
37	Jeong Seung-bin	South Korea	CB	3 July 2006 (aged 19)
38	Park Su-hwan	South Korea	CB	27 April 2006 (aged 19)
47	Shin Min-ha	South Korea	CB	15 September 2005 (aged 20)
73	Yun Il-lok	South Korea	RB / RW	7 March 1992 (aged 33)
99	Kang Jun-hyuk	South Korea	RB	20 October 1999 (aged 26)
Midfielders
4	Seo Min-woo (VC)	South Korea	CB / DM	12 March 1998 (aged 27)
6	Kim Dong-hyun	South Korea	DM	11 June 1997 (aged 28)
8	Kang Yun-gu	South Korea	CM	8 April 2002 (aged 23)
14	Kim Dae-woo	South Korea	CM	2 December 2000 (aged 25)
18	Kim Kang-kook	South Korea	CM	7 January 1997 (aged 28)
28	Lee Seung-won	South Korea	CM	6 March 2003 (aged 22)
35	Kim Tae-hwan	South Korea	CM / DM	29 May 2006 (aged 19)
36	Hwnag Eun-chong	South Korea	AM / RW	10 January 2006 (aged 19)
70	Goo Bon-cheul	South Korea	CM / AM	11 October 1999 (aged 26)
97	Lee You-hyeon (C)	South Korea	CM / RB	8 February 1997 (aged 28)
Forwards
7	Kim Dae-won (VC)	South Korea	LW / AM	10 February 1997 (aged 28)
10	Vitor Gabriel	Brazil	ST / CF	20 January 2000 (aged 25)
15	Jin Jun-seo	South Korea	CF	1 February 2005 (aged 20)
16	Kim Gun-hee (VC)	South Korea	ST / CF	22 February 1995 (aged 30)
17	Cho Jin-hyuk	South Korea	LW	10 August 2000 (aged 25)
19	Park Sang-hyeok	South Korea	ST	13 June 2002 (aged 23)
26	Kim Min-jun	South Korea	RW	12 February 2000 (aged 25)
30	Jeong In-jeung	South Korea	RW / LW	6 July 2004 (aged 21)
32	Yoo Byung-heon	South Korea	ST / CF	1 February 2006 (aged 19)
39	Lee Ji-ho	South Korea	LW / ST	16 April 2002 (aged 23)
42	Mo Jae-hyeon	South Korea	RW	24 September 1996 (aged 29)
77	Sung Gi-wan	South Korea	LW / SS	1 January 2004 (aged 21)
90	Kim Sin-jin	South Korea	ST	13 July 2001 (aged 24)
95	Kim Hyeong-jin	South Korea	RW	19 November 2006 (aged 19)
96	Choe Byeong-chan	South Korea	RW / RWB / RB	4 April 1996 (aged 29)
Out on loan
	Hwang Mun-ki	South Korea	RB / RWB / CM	8 December 1996 (aged 29)
	Lee Dong-jin	South Korea	CB	17 December 2000 (aged 25)
	Kim Yi-seok	South Korea	DM	19 June 1998 (aged 27)
	Choi Han-sol	South Korea	CB / DM	16 March 1997 (aged 28)
	Won Hui-do	South Korea	DM	1 August 2005 (aged 20)
	Mario Ćuže	Croatia	LW	24 April 1999 (aged 26)
	Lee Sang-heon	South Korea	LW / ST / AM	26 February 1998 (aged 27)

Last updated: 17 November 2025.
Source: Gangwon FC

== Transfers ==
=== Out ===
Date from	Position	Nationality	Player	To	Notes	Ref.
Pre-season
31 December 2024	FW	(South Korea)	Jung Han-min	(South Korea) FC Seoul	End of loan	
31 December 2024	MF	(Australia)	Henry Hore	(Australia) Brisbane Roar	End of loan	
31 December 2024	FW	(Bosnia and Herzegovina)	Irfan Hadžić	Free agent	End of contract	
31 December 2024	DF	(South Korea)	Lee Ji-sol	(South Korea) Suwon FC	End of contract	
31 December 2024	DF	(South Korea)	Kim Woo-seok	(South Korea) Dangjin Citizen	End of contract	
31 December 2024	DF	(South Korea)	Park Tae-rang	(South Korea) Sejong SA	End of contract	
31 December 2024	DF	(South Korea)	Park Sang-hyun	Free agent	End of contract	
31 December 2024	DF	(South Korea)	Ryu Kwang-hyun	(South Korea) Jeonnam Dragons	End of contract	
31 December 2024	MF	(South Korea)	Hong Sung-moo	(South Korea) Sejong SA	End of contract	
31 December 2024	DF	(South Korea)	Kim Hae-seung	(South Korea) Gimhae Jamix FC	End of contract	
31 December 2024	DF	(South Korea)	Yun Suk-young	(South Korea) Chungbuk Cheongju	End of contract	
1 January 2025	FW	(South Korea)	Yang Min-hyeok	(England) Tottenham Hotspur	Undisclosed	(Note: Yang's transfer was announced on 28 July 2024 and his contract will commence on 1 January 2025.)
2 January 2025	DF	(South Korea)	Kim Young-bin	(South Korea) Jeonbuk Hyundai Motors	Undisclosed	
2 January 2025	FW	(South Korea)	Choe Seong-min	(South Korea) Gangneung City	End of contract	
20 January 2025	DF	(South Korea)	Yu In-soo	(South Korea) Jeju SK FC	Undisclosed	
11 February 2025	FW	(South Korea)	Park Kyung-bae	(South Korea) Seoul E-Land	Undisclosed	
Mid-season
22 April 2025	FW	(Guinea-Bissau)	Romário Baldé	Free agent	Released	
16 June 2025	FW	(Croatia)	Franko Kovačević	(Germany) Wehen Wiesbaden	End of loan	
9 July 2025	FW	(South Korea)	Kim Gyeong-min	(South Korea) Suwon FC	Undisclosed	

- Note: Players will join other clubs after being released or terminated from their contract. Only the following clubs are mentioned when that club signed the player in the same transfer window.

=== Loan out ===
Date from	Position	Nationality	Player	To	Date until	Ref.
Pre-season
6 January 2024	DF	(South Korea)	Hwang Mun-ki	(South Korea) Pyeongchang United	September 2026	
Mid-season
18 March 2025	DF	(South Korea)	Lee Dong-jin	(South Korea) Sejong SA FC	End of season	
7 April 2025	MF	(South Korea)	Kim Yi-seok	(South Korea) Gimcheon Sangmu	October 2026	(Note: Kim Yi-seok's loan for military duty was announced on 20 December 2024 and his loan commenced on 7 April 2025.)
2 July 2025	DF	(South Korea)	Choi Han-sol	(South Korea) Jeonnam Dragons	End of season	
10 July 2025	MF	(South Korea)	Won Hui-do	(South Korea) Pocheon Citizen	End of season	
2 September 2025	FW	(Croatia)	Mario Ćuže	(Bosnia and Herzegovina) Zrinjski Mostar	30 June 2026	
17 November 2025	FW	(South Korea)	Lee Sang-heon	(South Korea) Gimcheon Sangmu	May 2027	(Note: Lee Sang-heon's loan for military duty was announced on 14 August 2025 and his loan commenced on 17 November 2025.)

=== In ===
Date from	Position	Nationality	Player	From	Notes	Ref.
Pre-season
13 December 2024	MF	(South Korea)	Lee You-hyeon	(South Korea) Jeonbuk Hyundai Motors	Undisclosed	
19 December 2024	FW	(South Korea)	Kim Hyeong-jin	(South Korea) Gangwon FC U-18	Undisclosed	(Note: First professional contract)
19 December 2024	MF	(South Korea)	Kim Tae-hwan	(South Korea) Yeongdeungpo Technical High School	Undisclosed	
19 December 2024	MF	(South Korea)	Hwnag Eun-chong	(South Korea) Shinpyeong High School	Undisclosed	
19 December 2024	FW	(South Korea)	Sung Gi-wan	(South Korea) Ajou University	Undisclosed	
19 December 2024	DF	(South Korea)	Jeong Seung-bin	(South Korea) Hwaseong U-18	Undisclosed	
19 December 2024	FW	(South Korea)	Yoo Byung-heon	(South Korea) Suwon Samsung Bluewings U-18	Undisclosed	
19 December 2024	FW	(South Korea)	Lee Ji-ho	(South Korea) Korea University	Undisclosed	
24 December 2024	FW	(South Korea)	Kim Do-hyun	(South Korea) Busan IPark	Undisclosed	
25 December 2024	DF	(South Korea)	Choi Jeong-hoon	(South Korea) Yeoju FC	Undisclosed	
31 December 2024	DF	(South Korea)	Park Su-hwan	(South Korea) Yongin FC U-18	Undisclosed	
1 January 2025	MF	(South Korea)	Kang Yun-gu	(South Korea) Ulsan HD	Undisclosed	
2 January 2025	DF	(South Korea)	Park Ho-young	(South Korea) Pocheon FC	Free agent	
3 January 2025	DF	(South Korea)	Hong Chul	(South Korea) Daegu FC	Free agent	
4 January 2025	DF	(South Korea)	Choe Byeong-chan	(South Korea) Bucheon FC 1995	Free agent	
5 January 2025	DF	(South Korea)	Kang Jun-hyuk	(South Korea) Chungnam Asan FC	Free agent	
6 January 2025	DF	(South Korea)	Choi Han-sol	(South Korea) Ansan Greeners FC	Free agent	
7 January 2025	MF	(South Korea)	Kim Min-jun	(South Korea) Ulsan HD	Undisclosed	
20 January 2025	MF	(South Korea)	Yun Il-lok	(South Korea) Ulsan HD	Undisclosed	
20 January 2025	MF	(South Korea)	Won Hui-do	(South Korea) Jeju SK FC	Undisclosed	
29 January 2025	FW	(Croatia)	Mario Ćuže	(Bosnia and Herzegovina) Zrinjski Mostar	Undisclosed	
7 February 2025	FW	(Guinea-Bissau)	Romário Baldé	(China) Wuhan Three Towns	Free agent	
Mid-season
25 March 2025	GK	(South Korea)	Hong Jin-hyeok	(South Korea) Yong In University	Undisclosed	
27 March 2025	FW	(South Korea)	Jeong In-jeung	(South Korea) Songho University	Undisclosed	
10 June 2025	FW	(South Korea)	Kim Gun-hee	(Japan) Consadole Sapporo	Undisclosed	
17 June 2025	FW	(South Korea)	Mo Jae-hyeon	(South Korea) Gyeongnam FC	Undisclosed	
18 June 2025	FW	(South Korea)	Kim Dae-won	(South Korea) Gimcheon Sangmu	Loan return	
18 June 2025	MF	(South Korea)	Seo Min-woo	(South Korea) Gimcheon Sangmu	Loan return	
30 June 2025	DF	(Brazil)	Bruno Oliveira	(South Korea) Gwangju FC	Free agent	
24 July 2025	FW	(South Korea)	Kim Sin-jin	(South Korea) FC Seoul	Undisclosed	
28 October 2025	FW	(South Korea)	Park Sang-hyeok	(South Korea) Gimcheon Sangmu	Loan return	
28 October 2025	MF	(South Korea)	Lee Seung-won	(South Korea) Gimcheon Sangmu	Loan return	

=== Loan in ===
Date from	Position	Nationality	Player	From	Date until	Ref.
Mid-season
26 March 2025	MF	(South Korea)	Goo Bon-cheul	(South Korea) Seongnam FC	End of season	

== Pre-season and friendlies ==
Win Draw Loss Fixtures

4 January 2025 Friendly	1. FC Magdeburg (Germany)	5–0	(South Korea) Gangwon FC	Manavgat, Antalya, Turkey
14:30 (UTC+3)	El Hankouri 45+1'; Ahl Holmström 52'; Ceka 59'; Krempicki 86'; Baars 90'			Stadium: Arslan Zeki Demirci Sports Complex

8 January 2025 Friendly	FC Universitatea Cluj (Romania)	4–1	(South Korea) Gangwon FC	Manavgat, Antalya, Turkey
16:00 (UTC+3)	Bic 4'; Blănuță 34'; Miranyan 52'; Bettaieb 79'		Kim Gyeong-min 5'	Stadium: Arslan Zeki Demirci Sports Complex

10 January 2025 Friendly	FK Novi Pazar (Serbia)	1–1	(South Korea) Gangwon FC	Lara, Antalya, Turkey
15:00 (UTC+3)	Brunčević		Hwnag Eun-chong	Stadium: Miracle Resort Hotel Training Center

12 January 2025 Friendly	OFK Beograd (Serbia)	2–0	(South Korea) Gangwon FC	Antalya, Turkey
17:00 (UTC+3)	Cvetković; Obasi

15 January 2025 Friendly	Bruk-Bet Termalica (Poland)	1–2	(South Korea) Gangwon FC	Antalya, Turkey
	Karasek 20'		Lee Ji-ho 52'; Jin Jun-seo 86'

18 January 2025 Friendly	Korona Kielce (Poland)	0–0	(South Korea) Gangwon FC	Antalya, Turkey

18 January 2025 Friendly	Shakhtar Donetsk U19 (Ukraine)	1–0	(South Korea) Gangwon FC U19	Antalya, Turkey
	Oleksandr Lomaha 30'

22 January 2025 Friendly	FK IMT (Serbia)	2–1	(South Korea) Gangwon FC	Antalya, Turkey
			Hwnag Eun-chong 5'

23 January 2025 Friendly	PFC CSKA Sofia (Bulgaria)	3–0	(South Korea) Gangwon FC	Antalya, Turkey
	Iliev; Kim Dae-woo (o.g.); Shopov

25 January 2025 Friendly	SK Sigma Olomouc (Czech Republic)	2–1	(South Korea) Gangwon FC	Antalya, Turkey
	Israel 81'; Sýkora 86'		Lee Ji-ho 38'

29 January 2025 Friendly	FK Željezničar Sarajevo (Bosnia and Herzegovina)	0–1	(South Korea) Gangwon FC	Antalya, Turkey
			Lee Ki-hyuk 38'

30 January 2025 Friendly	FK Sileks (North Macedonia)	1–1	(South Korea) Gangwon FC	Antalya, Turkey
	Goal		Ćuže 51'

== Competitions ==
=== Overall record ===
Competition	First match	Last match	Starting round	Final position	Record							
Competition	First match	Last match	Starting round	Final position	Pld	W	D	L	GF	GA	GD	Win %
K League 1	16 February 2025	30 November 2025	Matchday 1	5th	38	13	13	12	37	41	−4	34.21
Korea Cup	14 May 2025	27 August 2025	Round of 16	Semifinals	4	2	1	1	6	4	+2	50.00
Champions League Elite	16 September 2025	9 December 2025 (Note: The tournament will continue into the 2026 season.)	League stage	League stage	6	2	1	3	9	11	−2	33.33
Total					48	17	15	16	52	56	−4	35.42

Last updated: 9 December 2025
Source: Competitions

=== K League 1 ===
==== League table ====
Pos	Team	Pld	W	D	L	GF	GA	GD	Pts	Qualification or relegation (Note: Teams played each other three times (33 matches), before the league was split into two groups, the top six and the bottom six.)
3	Gimcheon Sangmu (Note: Military-owned team Gimcheon Sangmu cannot qualify for AFC competitions.)	38	18	7	13	59	45	+14	61	
4	Pohang Steelers	38	16	8	14	41	46	−5	56	Qualification for Champions League Elite league stage
5	Gangwon FC	38	13	13	12	37	41	−4	52	Qualification for Champions League Elite preliminary stage
6	FC Seoul	38	12	13	13	50	52	−2	49	Qualification for Champions League Two group stage
7	Gwangju FC	38	15	9	14	40	41	−1	54	

Source: Soccerway K League
Rules for classification: 1) Points; 2) Goals scored; 3) Goal difference; 4) Wins; 5) Head-to-head points

==== Results summary ====
Overall								Home						Away					
Pld	W	D	L	GF	GA	GD	Pts	W	D	L	GF	GA	GD	W	D	L	GF	GA	GD
38	13	13	12	37	41	−4	52	6	9	4	18	20	−2	7	4	8	19	21	−2

Last updated: 30 November 2025.
Source: Soccerway

==== Results by round ====
Round	1	2	3	4	5	6	7	8	9	10	11	12	13	14	15	16	17	18	19	20	21	22	23	24	25	26	27	28	29	30	31	32	33	34	35	36	37	38
Ground	A	H	H	A	H	A	A	H	A	A	H	A	H	H	A	H	A	H	A	H	A	H	A	H	H	A	A	H	H	A	H	H	A	A	H	A	A	H
Result	L	W	D	W	L	L	L	W	W	L	D	W	L	D	W	L	L	L	D	W	W	D	L	D	D	D	W	W	W	L	D	D	D	L	D	W	D	W
Position	8	6	8	5	6	10	11	8	7	9	8	6	8	8	7	8	9	10	10	8	8	8	9	8	8	8	7	7	6	7	7	6	6	6	6	6	6	5
Points	0	3	4	7	7	7	7	10	13	13	14	17	17	18	21	21	21	21	22	25	28	29	29	30	31	32	35	38	41	41	42	43	44	44	45	48	49	52

Updated to match(es) played on 30 November 2025. Source: K League Data Portal
A = Away; H = Home; W = Win; D = Draw; L = Loss

==== Matches ====
As usual, the league season will be played with 38 matches split in two stages. After 33 league matches between the 12 participating teams, the teams are split into the Final Round (Top 6 teams, which aims to won an AFC Champions spot) and Relegation Round (Bottom 6 teams, that aims to survive relegation). On 10 January 2025, K League announced schedule of the 2025 season except final round. On 20 October 2025, K League announced schedule of the final round of 2025 season.

All times are local, KST (UTC+9).

16 February 2025 1	Daegu FC	2-1	Gangwon FC	Daegu
16:30	Bruno Lamas 55'; Cesinha 90+3'		Vitor Gabriel 43'	Stadium: Daegu iM Bank Park; Attendance: 12,240; Referee: Seol Tae-hwan

23 February 2025 2	Gangwon FC	2-1	Pohang Steelers	Chuncheon
16:30	Lee Ji-ho 81', 90+2'		Lee Ho-jae 43'	Stadium: Chuncheon Songam Sports Town; Attendance: 6,539; Referee: Song Min-seok

2 March 2025 3	Gangwon FC	0-0	Jeju SK FC	Chuncheon
16:30				Stadium: Chuncheon Songam Sports Town; Attendance: 5,009; Referee: Lee Dong-jun

9 March 2025 4	Jeonbuk Hyundai Motors	0-1	Gangwon FC	Jeonju
16:30			Kim Gyeong-min 89'	Stadium: Jeonju World Cup Stadium; Attendance: 14,090; Referee: Kim Jong-hyeok

15 March 2025 5	Gangwon FC	0-1	FC Seoul	Chuncheon
16:30			Cho Young-wook 18'	Stadium: Chuncheon Songam Sports Town; Attendance: 10,231; Referee: Sin Yong-jun

30 March 2025 6	Gimcheon Sangmu	1-0	Gangwon FC	Gimcheon
16:30	Lee Dong-gyeong 75'			Stadium: Gimcheon Stadium; Attendance: 2,026; Referee: Park Byung-jin

6 April 2025 7	FC Anyang	2-0	Gangwon FC	Anyang
16:30	Choi Kyu-hyun 83'; Thomas 90+2'			Stadium: Anyang Sports Complex; Attendance: 8,127; Referee: Seol Tae-hwan

13 April 2025 8	Gangwon FC	1-0	Gwangju FC	Chuncheon
14:00	Choe Byeong-chan 16'			Stadium: Chuncheon Songam Sports Town; Attendance: 5,080; Referee: Kim Dae-yong

19 April 2025 9	Ulsan HD	1-2	Gangwon FC	Ulsan
14:00	Erick Farias 45+2' (pen.)		Kim Kang-kook 16'; Shin Min-ha 47'	Stadium: Ulsan Munsu Football Stadium; Attendance: 13,536; Referee: Kim Woo-sung

27 April 2025 10	Daejeon Hana Citizen	1-0	Gangwon FC	Daejeon
16:30	Joo Min-kyu 73'		Kim Gyeong-min (red card) 54'	Stadium: Daejeon World Cup Stadium; Attendance: 9,412; Referee: Song Min-seok

3 May 2025 11	Gangwon FC	0-0	Suwon FC	Chuncheon
19:00				Stadium: Chuncheon Songam Sports Town; Attendance: 5,105; Referee: Ko Hyung-jin

6 May 2025 12	Jeju SK FC	0-3	Gangwon FC	Seogwipo
16:30			Kovačević 6'; Cho Jin-hyuk 46'; Lee Ji-ho 77'	Stadium: Jeju World Cup Stadium; Attendance: 11,017; Referee: Kim Dae-yong

11 May 2025 13	Gangwon FC	0-4	Gimcheon Sangmu	Chuncheon
19:00			Cho Hyun-taek 5'; Mo Jae-hyeon 36'; Park Sang-hyeok 55'; Lee Dong-jun 86'	Stadium: Chuncheon Songam Sports Town; Attendance: 3,628; Referee: Seol Tae-hwan

17 May 2025 14	Gangwon FC	1-1	Ulsan HD	Chuncheon
19:00	Cho Jin-hyuk 90+2'		Seo Myeong-kwan 64'	Stadium: Chuncheon Songam Sports Town; Attendance: 6,920; Referee: Song Min-seok

25 May 2025 15	Gwangju FC	0-1	Gangwon FC	Gwangju
16:30			Kim Dong-hyun 90+6' (pen.)	Stadium: Gwangju Football Stadium; Attendance: 4,554; Referee: Kim Jong-hyeok

28 May 2025 16	Gangwon FC	1-3	FC Anyang	Chuncheon
19:30	Vitor Gabriel 83'		Matheus Oliveira 21', 25'; Bruno Mota 88'	Stadium: Chuncheon Songam Sports Town; Attendance: 3,135; Referee: Kim Woo-sung

1 June 2025 17	Pohang Steelers	2-1	Gangwon FC	Pohang
19:00	Jorge Luiz 45+1'; Lee Ho-jae 68'		Vitor Gabriel 11'	Stadium: Pohang Steel Yard; Attendance: 8,944; Referee: Kim Hee-gon

13 June 2025 18	Gangwon FC	0-3	Jeonbuk Hyundai Motors	Chuncheon
19:30			Tiago Orobó 5', 31'; Jeon Jin-woo 78'	Stadium: Chuncheon Songam Sports Town; Attendance: 6,219; Referee: Sin Yong-jun

17 June 2025 19	FC Seoul	1-1	Gangwon FC	Seoul
19:30	Moon Seon-min 71'		Lee Sang-heon 24'	Stadium: Seoul World Cup Stadium; Attendance: 15,290; Referee: Choi Kwang-ho

21 June 2025 20	Gangwon FC	3-0	Daegu FC	Gangneung
19:00	Mo Jae-hyeon 44'; Kim Gun-hee 73'; Lee Sang-heon 77'			Stadium: Gangneung Stadium; Attendance: 9,256; Referee: Kim Dae-yong

28 June 2025 21	Suwon FC	1-2	Gangwon FC	Suwon
19:00	Luan Dias 46'		Vitor Gabriel 37'; Kim Dae-won 90' (yellow card) 86' (yellow-red card) 90+1'	Stadium: Suwon Stadium; Attendance: 3,401; Referee: Park Byung-jin

19 July 2025 22	Gangwon FC	2-2	Daejeon Hana Citizen	Gangneung
19:00	Mo Jae-hyeon 90+4'; Kim Gun-hee 90+5'		Kim Hyeon-ug 50' (pen.); Hernandes 59'	Stadium: Gangneung Stadium; Attendance: 10,207; Referee: Kim Jong-hyeok

23 July 2025 23	Jeonbuk Hyundai Motors	2-0	Gangwon FC	Jeonju
19:30	Kim Jin-gyu 38'; Compagno 42' (pen.)		Kim Dae-woo (red card) 45+3'	Stadium: Jeonju World Cup Stadium; Attendance: 13,795; Referee: Jeong Hoi-soo

27 July 2025 24	Gangwon FC	2-2	Ulsan HD	Gangneung
19:00	Kim Dae-won 50'; Hong Chul 90+7'		Marcão 29', 82'	Stadium: Gangneung Stadium; Attendance: 9,144; Referee: Chae Sang-hyeop

9 August 2025 25	Gangwon FC	0-0	Gimcheon Sangmu	Gangneung
19:00				Stadium: Gangneung Stadium; Attendance: 9,415; Referee: Sin Yong-jun

15 August 2025 26	Jeju SK FC	0-0	Gangwon FC	Seogwipo
19:00	Kim Jun-ha (yellow card) 23' (yellow-red card) 36'			Stadium: Jeju World Cup Stadium; Attendance: 8,093; Referee: Kim Woo-sung

23 August 2025 27	Gwangju FC	0-1	Gangwon FC	Gwangju
19:00	Jin Si-woo (yellow card) 29' (yellow-red card) 66'		Lee Ji-ho 20'	Stadium: Gwangju Football Stadium; Attendance: 3,044; Referee: Kim Jong-hyeok

31 August 2025 28	Gangwon FC	1-0	Pohang Steelers	Gangneung
19:00	Mo Jae-hyeon 39'			Stadium: Gangneung Stadium; Attendance: 8,505; Referee: Song Min-seok

13 September 2025 29	Gangwon FC	3-2	FC Seoul	Gangneung
19:00	Lee You-hyeon 39'; Kim Gun-hee 51' (pen.); Lee Sang-heon 54'		Cho Young-wook 65'; Kim Jin-su 74'	Stadium: Gangneung Stadium; Attendance: 7,572; Referee: Ko Hyung-jin

21 September 2025 30	Suwon FC	1-0	Gangwon FC	Suwon
16:30	Tući 46' (o.g.)			Stadium: Suwon Stadium; Attendance: 4,005; Referee: Seol Tae-hwan

27 September 2025 31	Gangwon FC	0-0	Daejeon Hana Citizen	Gangneung
14:00				Stadium: Gangneung Stadium; Attendance: 7,112; Referee: Kim Dae-yong

5 October 2025 32	Gangwon FC	1-1	FC Anyang	Gangneung
16:30	Kim Gun-hee 73'		Kim Bo-kyung 86'	Stadium: Gangneung Stadium; Attendance: 8,464; Referee: Kim Jong-hyeok

18 October 2025 33	Daegu FC	2-2	Gangwon FC	Daegu
14:00	Cesinha 79' (pen.); Edgar 90+5'		Lee Sang-heon 5'; Seo Min-woo 15'	Stadium: Daegu iM Bank Park; Attendance: 10,795; Referee: Song Min-seok

26 October 2025 34	FC Seoul	4-2	Gangwon FC	Seoul
14:00	Lingard 72', 77'; Ryu Jae-moon 79'; Cheon Seong-hoon 90+9'		Kim Gun-hee 11'; Mo Jae-hyeon 52'	Stadium: Seoul World Cup Stadium; Attendance: 12,177; Referee: Ko Hyung-jin

1 November 2025 35	Gangwon FC	0-0	Jeonbuk Hyundai Motors	Gangneung
14:00				Stadium: Gangneung Stadium; Attendance: 6,424; Referee: Sin Yong-jun

8 November 2025 36	Gimcheon Sangmu	0-1	Gangwon FC	Gimcheon
16:30			Park Sang-hyeok 30'	Stadium: Gimcheon Stadium; Attendance: 1,405; Referee: Song Min-seok

22 November 2025 37	Daejeon Hana Citizen	1-1	Gangwon FC	Daejeon
14:00	Kang Yoon-sung 22'		Park Sang-hyeok 60'	Stadium: Daejeon World Cup Stadium; Attendance: 9,102; Referee: Kim Yong-woo

30 November 2025 38	Gangwon FC	1-0	Pohang Steelers	Gangneung
16:30	Mo Jae-hyeon 61'			Stadium: Gangneung Stadium; Attendance: 6,524; Referee: Kim Woo-sung

=== Korea Cup ===
14 May 2025 Round of 16	Gangwon FC	2-1	Siheung Citizen FC	Gangneung
19:00	Ahn Ji-ho 77' (o.g.); Cho Jin-hyuk 84'		Yoo Ji-min 24' (pen.)	Stadium: Gangneung Stadium; Attendance: 3,107; Referee: Choi Seung-hwan

2 July 2025 Quarterfinal	Daegu FC	1-2	Gangwon FC	Daegu
19:00	Cesinha 61' (pen.)		Goo Bon-cheul 43'; Kim Gun-hee 48'	Stadium: Daegu iM Bank Park; Attendance: 4,011; Referee: Ko Hyung-jin

20 August 2025 Semifinal 1st leg	Jeonbuk Hyundai Motors	1-1	Gangwon FC	Jeonju
19:00	Kim Young-bin 48'		Goo Bon-cheul 62'	Stadium: Jeonju World Cup Stadium; Attendance: 8,695; Referee: Seol Tae-hwan

27 August 2025 Semifinal 2nd leg	Gangwon FC	1-2	Jeonbuk Hyundai Motors	Gangneung
19:30	Kim Dae-won 53' (pen.)		Tiago Orobó 90+3' (pen.); Twumasi 90+8'	Stadium: Gangneung Stadium; Attendance: 6,739; Referee: Kim Woo-sung

=== AFC Champions League Elite ===
==== League stage ====
===== League stage (East Region) table =====
Pos	Team	Pld	W	D	L	GF	GA	GD	Pts	Qualification
6	(Malaysia) Johor Darul Ta'zim	8	3	2	3	8	7	+1	11	Advance to round of 16
7	(South Korea) FC Seoul	8	2	4	2	10	9	+1	10	Advance to round of 16
8	(South Korea) Gangwon FC	8	2	3	3	9	11	−2	9	Advance to round of 16
9	(South Korea) Ulsan HD	8	2	3	3	6	8	−2	9	
10	(China) Chengdu Rongcheng	8	1	3	4	7	11	−4	6	

Source: AFC
Rules for classification: 1) points; 2) goal difference; 3) number of goals scored; 4) number of matches won; 5) penalty shoot-out if only two teams remain tied and played each other on the final matchday 6) fair play ranking; 7) drawing of lots

===== Results summary (ACLE) =====
Overall								Home						Away					
Pld	W	D	L	GF	GA	GD	Pts	W	D	L	GF	GA	GD	W	D	L	GF	GA	GD
6	2	1	3	9	11	−2	7	2	0	1	7	7	0	0	1	2	2	4	−2

Last updated: 9 December 2025.
Source: ACLE

===== Results by round (ACLE) =====
Round	1	2	3	4	5	6
Ground	H	A	H	A	H	A
Result	W	L	W	L	L	D
Position	3	5	3	5	9	9
Points	3	3	6	6	6	7

Updated to match(es) played on 10 December 2025. Source: ACLE
A = Away; H = Home; W = Win; D = Draw; L = Loss; P = Postponed

===== Matches (ACLE) =====
16 September 2025 1	Gangwon FC (South Korea)	2-1	(China) Shanghai Shenhua	Chuncheon, South Korea
19:00 UTC+9	Hong Chul 54'; Goo Bon-cheul 63'	Report	Teixeira 45+1'	Stadium: Chuncheon Songam Sports Town; Attendance: 4,091; Referee: Ammar Ebrahim Mahfoodh (Bahrain)

30 September 2025 2	Chengdu Rongcheng (China)	1-0	(South Korea) Gangwon FC	Chengdu, China
20:15 UTC+8	Chow 35'	Report		Stadium: Phoenix Hill Football Stadium; Attendance: 41,463; Referee: Adel Al-Naqbi (United Arab Emirates)

22 October 2025 3	Gangwon FC (South Korea)	4-3	(Japan) Vissel Kobe	Chuncheon, South Korea
19:00 UTC+9	Lee Sang-heon 7'; Mo Jae-hyeon 21' (yellow card) 67' (yellow-red card) 90+8'; Song Jun-seok 43'; Kim Gun-hee 90+5'	Report	Miyashiro 48', 89'; Patric 50'	Stadium: Chuncheon Songam Sports Town; Attendance: 4,158; Referee: Mooud Bonyadifard (Iran)

4 November 2025 4	Sanfrecce Hiroshima (Japan)	1-0	(South Korea) Gangwon FC	Hiroshima, Japan
19:00 UTC+9	Kato 63'; Sasaki (yellow card) 61' (yellow-red card) 69'	Report		Stadium: Edion Peace Wing Hiroshima; Attendance: 8,924; Referee: Casey Reibelt (Australia)

25 November 2025 5	Gangwon FC (South Korea)	1-3	(Japan) Machida Zelvia	Chuncheon, South Korea
19:00 UTC+9	Park Ho-young 55'	Report	Sento 24'; Shimoda 28'; Oh Se-hun 39'	Stadium: Chuncheon Songam Sports Town; Attendance: 3,502; Referee: Khalid Saleh Al-Turais (Saudi Arabia)

9 December 2025 6	Buriram United (Thailand)	2-2	(South Korea) Gangwon FC	Buriram, Thailand
19:15 UTC+7	Ko Myeong-seok 58'; Suphanat 65'	Report	Mo Jae-hyeon 33'; Kim Dae-won 74' (pen.)	Stadium: Chang Arena; Attendance: 15,329; Referee: Omar Al-Ali (United Arab Emirates)

The tournament will continue into the 2026 season.

== Statistics ==
=== Appearances and goals ===
Last updated on 9 December 2025.

No.	Pos	Nat	Player	Total		K League 1		Korea Cup		ACLE	
No.	Pos	Nat	Player	Apps	Goals	Apps	Goals	Apps	Goals	Apps	Goals
Goalkeepers
1	GK	(South Korea) KOR	Lee Gwang-yeon	24	0	19+1	0	2	0	2	0
21	GK	(South Korea) KOR	Park Cheong-hyo	25	0	19	0	2	0	4	0
31	GK	(South Korea) KOR	Hong Jin-hyeok	0	0	0	0	0	0	0	0
41	GK	(South Korea) KOR	Kim Yu-seong	0	0	0	0	0	0	0	0
71	GK	(South Korea) KOR	Cho Min-kyu	0	0	0	0	0	0	0	0
Defenders
3	DF	(Brazil) BRA	Bruno Oliveira	1	0	0	0	1	0	0	0
13	DF	(South Korea) KOR	Lee Ki-hyuk	36	0	25+6	0	0+2	0	1+2	0
20	DF	(South Korea) KOR	Jo Hyun-tae	10	0	1+2	0	1+2	0	2+2	0
23	DF	(Montenegro) MNE	Marko Tući	35	0	30+1	0	1	0	3	0
24	DF	(South Korea) KOR	Park Ho-young	28	1	7+13	0	4	0	3+1	1
25	DF	(South Korea) KOR	Choi Jeong-hoon	1	0	0	0	0+1	0	0	0
27	DF	(South Korea) KOR	Kim Do-hyun	31	0	4+20	0	2	0	3+2	0
33	DF	(South Korea) KOR	Hong Chul	26	2	11+10	1	1	0	2+2	1
34	DF	(South Korea) KOR	Song Jun-seok	29	1	20+4	0	1+1	0	3	1
37	DF	(South Korea) KOR	Jeong Seung-bin	3	0	0	0	0+1	0	0+2	0
38	DF	(South Korea) KOR	Park Su-hwan	0	0	0	0	0	0	0	0
47	DF	(South Korea) KOR	Shin Min-ha	35	1	27+2	1	2	0	4	0
73	DF	(South Korea) KOR	Yun Il-lok	12	0	3+3	0	2	0	2+2	0
99	DF	(South Korea) KOR	Kang Jun-hyuk	27	0	18+4	0	1	0	4	0
Midfielders
4	MF	(South Korea) KOR	Seo Min-woo	22	1	15+1	1	1	0	4+1	0
6	MF	(South Korea) KOR	Kim Dong-hyun	22	1	18+4	1	0	0	0	0
8	MF	(South Korea) KOR	Kang Yun-gu	10	0	0+5	0	0+2	0	1+2	0
14	MF	(South Korea) KOR	Kim Dae-woo	22	0	12+5	0	2	0	2+1	0
18	MF	(South Korea) KOR	Kim Kang-kook	32	1	15+10	1	2	0	3+2	0
28	MF	(South Korea) KOR	Lee Seung-won	5	0	2+1	0	0	0	2	0
35	MF	(South Korea) KOR	Kim Tae-hwan	2	0	0+1	0	1	0	0	0
36	MF	(South Korea) KOR	Hwnag Eun-chong	2	0	0	0	1	0	0+1	0
70	MF	(South Korea) KOR	Goo Bon-cheul	19	3	10+4	0	2	2	2+1	1
97	MF	(South Korea) KOR	Lee You-hyeon	32	1	28+1	1	1	0	2	0
Forwards
7	FW	(South Korea) KOR	Kim Dae-won	25	4	17+1	2	1+1	1	4+1	1
10	FW	(Brazil) BRA	Vitor Gabriel	30	4	16+11	4	1	0	1+1	0
15	FW	(South Korea) KOR	Jin Jun-seo	3	0	1+1	0	1	0	0	0
16	FW	(South Korea) KOR	Kim Gun-hee	27	7	12+8	5	1+1	1	4+1	1
17	FW	(South Korea) KOR	Cho Jin-hyuk	7	3	1+4	2	1+1	1	0	0
19	FW	(South Korea) KOR	Park Sang-hyeok	6	2	2+2	2	0	0	1+1	0
26	FW	(South Korea) KOR	Kim Min-jun	13	0	6+3	0	2	0	1+1	0
30	FW	(South Korea) KOR	Jeong In-jeung	2	0	0	0	0+1	0	0+1	0
32	FW	(South Korea) KOR	Yoo Byung-heon	2	0	0	0	0+1	0	0+1	0
39	FW	(South Korea) KOR	Lee Ji-ho	29	4	16+11	4	1+1	0	0	0
42	FW	(South Korea) KOR	Mo Jae-hyeon	24	7	16+3	5	1	0	3+1	2
77	FW	(South Korea) KOR	Sung Gi-wan	1	0	0	0	1	0	0	0
90	FW	(South Korea) KOR	Kim Sin-jin	5	0	0+3	0	0+1	0	1	0
95	FW	(South Korea) KOR	Kim Hyeong-jin	0	0	0	0	0	0	0	0
96	FW	(South Korea) KOR	Choe Byeong-chan	14	1	7+3	1	2+1	0	1	0
Player(s) who left on loan during this season
5	DF	(South Korea) KOR	Choi Han-sol	7	0	2+4	0	1	0	0	0
11	FW	(Croatia) CRO	Mario Ćuže	3	0	0+2	0	0+1	0	0	0
16	MF	(South Korea) KOR	Kim Yi-seok	3	0	1+2	0	0	0	0	0
22	FW	(South Korea) KOR	Lee Sang-heon	34	5	24+6	4	1+1	0	1+1	1
28	MF	(South Korea) KOR	Won Hui-do	0	0	0	0	0	0	0	0
70	DF	(South Korea) KOR	Lee Dong-jin	0	0	0	0	0	0	0	0
Player(s) who left permanently during this season
9	FW	(Croatia) CRO	Franko Kovačević	12	1	5+7	1	0	0	0	0
19	FW	(South Korea) KOR	Kim Gyeong-min	14	1	8+6	1	0	0	0	0
45	FW	(Guinea-Bissau) GBS	Romário Baldé	1	0	0+1	0	0	0	0	0

=== Goalscorers ===
Italic marked players have left during the season.

Rank	Pos.	No.	Player	K League 1	Korea Cup	ACLE	Total
1	FW	16	(South Korea) Kim Gun-hee	5	1	1	7
1	FW	42	(South Korea) Mo Jae-hyeon	5	0	2	7
3	FW	22	(South Korea) Lee Sang-heon	4	0	1	5
4	FW	10	(Brazil) Vitor Gabriel	4	0	0	4
4	FW	39	(South Korea) Lee Ji-ho	4	0	0	4
4	FW	7	(South Korea) Kim Dae-won	2	1	1	4
7	FW	17	(South Korea) Cho Jin-hyuk	2	1	0	3
7	MF	70	(South Korea) Goo Bon-cheul	0	2	1	3
9	FW	19	(South Korea) Park Sang-hyeok	2	0	0	2
9	DF	33	(South Korea) Hong Chul	1	0	1	2
11	MF	4	(South Korea) Seo Min-woo	1	0	0	1
11	MF	6	(South Korea) Kim Dong-hyun	1	0	0	1
11	FW	9	(Croatia) Franko Kovačević	1	0	0	1
11	MF	18	(South Korea) Kim Kang-kook	1	0	0	1
11	FW	19	(South Korea) Kim Gyeong-min	1	0	0	1
11	DF	47	(South Korea) Shin Min-ha	1	0	0	1
11	FW	96	(South Korea) Choe Byeong-chan	1	0	0	1
11	MF	97	(South Korea) Lee You-hyeon	1	0	0	1
11	DF	24	(South Korea) Park Ho-young	0	0	1	1
11	DF	34	(South Korea) Song Jun-seok	0	0	1	1
-	Own goals			0	1	0	1
Totals				37	6	9	52

=== Top assists ===
Italic marked players have left during the season.

Rank	Pos.	No.	Player	K League 1	Korea Cup	ACLE	Total
1	FW	42	(South Korea) Mo Jae-hyeon	5	0	0	5
2	FW	39	(South Korea) Lee Ji-ho	3	1	0	4
2	FW	7	(South Korea) Kim Dae-won	3	0	1	4
4	MF	6	(South Korea) Kim Dong-hyun	2	0	0	2
4	FW	22	(South Korea) Lee Sang-heon	2	0	0	2
4	FW	26	(South Korea) Kim Min-jun	1	1	0	2
4	MF	18	(South Korea) Kim Kang-kook	1	0	1	2
8	GK	1	(South Korea) Lee Gwang-yeon	1	0	0	1
8	MF	8	(South Korea) Kang Yun-gu	1	0	0	1
8	FW	10	(Brazil) Vitor Gabriel	1	0	0	1
8	DF	13	(South Korea) Lee Ki-hyuk	1	0	0	1
8	DF	24	(South Korea) Park Ho-young	1	0	0	1
8	DF	34	(South Korea) Song Jun-seok	1	0	0	1
8	DF	47	(South Korea) Shin Min-ha	1	0	0	1
8	MF	97	(South Korea) Lee You-hyeon	1	0	0	1
8	DF	99	(South Korea) Kang Jun-hyuk	1	0	0	1
8	FW	90	(South Korea) Kim Sin-jin	0	1	0	1
8	DF	23	(Montenegro) Marko Tući	0	0	1	1
8	MF	70	(South Korea) Goo Bon-cheul	0	0	1	1
Totals				26	3	4	33

=== Clean sheets ===
Rank	No.	Player	K League 1	Korea Cup	ACLE	Total
1	21	(South Korea) Park Cheong-hyo	8	0	0	8
2	1	(South Korea) Lee Gwang-yeon	7	0	0	7
Totals			15	0	0	15

=== Discipline ===
Rank	Pos.	No.	Player	K League 1			Korea Cup			ACLE			Total		
Rank	Pos.	No.	Player	Yellow card	(yellow card) (yellow-red card)	Red card	Yellow card	(yellow card) (yellow-red card)	Red card	Yellow card	(yellow card) (yellow-red card)	Red card	Yellow card	(yellow card) (yellow-red card)	Red card
1	DF	34	(South Korea) Song Jun-seok	10			1						11		
2	DF	13	(South Korea) Lee Ki-hyuk	6			1						7		
3	MF	4	(South Korea) Seo Min-woo	4			1			1			6		
3	FW	7	(South Korea) Kim Dae-won	2	1					1			3	1	
3	MF	18	(South Korea) Kim Kang-kook	5			1						6		
3	DF	23	(Montenegro) Marko Tući	5						1			6		
3	DF	24	(South Korea) Park Ho-young	4			1			1			6		
8	FW	10	(Brazil) Vitor Gabriel	5									5		
8	FW	22	(South Korea) Lee Sang-heon	4			1						5		
8	DF	27	(South Korea) Kim Do-hyun	3			1			1			5		
11	FW	42	(South Korea) Mo Jae-hyeon	1							1		1	1	
11	MF	97	(South Korea) Lee You-hyeon	3						1			4		
13	DF	5	(South Korea) Choi Han-sol	2			1						3		
13	MF	14	(South Korea) Kim Dae-woo	2		1							2		1
13	FW	16	(South Korea) Kim Gun-hee	2						1			3		
13	DF	33	(South Korea) Hong Chul	3									3		
13	DF	47	(South Korea) Shin Min-ha	3									3		
18	GK	1	(South Korea) Lee Gwang-yeon	2									2		
18	FW	19	(South Korea) Kim Gyeong-min	1		1							1		1
18	FW	39	(South Korea) Lee Ji-ho	2									2		
21	MF	6	(South Korea) Kim Dong-hyun	1									1		
21	MF	8	(South Korea) Kang Yun-gu							1			1		
21	FW	9	(Croatia) Franko Kovačević	1									1		
21	FW	17	(South Korea) Cho Jin-hyuk	1									1		
21	GK	21	(South Korea) Park Cheong-hyo	1									1		
21	MF	28	(South Korea) Lee Seung-won	1						1			1		
21	MF	36	(South Korea) Hwnag Eun-chong							1			1		
21	DF	73	(South Korea) Yun Il-lok				1						1		
21	FW	96	(South Korea) Choe Byeong-chan	1									1		
21	DF	99	(South Korea) Kang Jun-hyuk	1									1		
Totals				75	1	2	9	0	0	10	1	0	94	2	2

== Awards ==
=== Annual awards ===
Note : Only included Gangwon FC players are listed.

Young Player of the Year		Best Eleven of the Year	
Player	Result	Player	Result
(South Korea) Lee Seung-won (MF)	Won	(South Korea) Mo Jae-hyeon (MF)	Nominated

=== Monthly awards ===
Note : Player of the Month, Goal of the Month and Save of the Month have official nominees. Only month included Gangwon FC manager or players are listed.

Month	Player of the Month		Young Player of the Month		Goal of the Month		Save of the Month		Manager of the Month	
Month	Player	Result	Player	Result	Player	Result	Player	Result	Manager	Result
February–March			(South Korea) Lee Ji-ho (FW)	Won			(South Korea) Lee Gwang-yeon (GK)	Won		
April			(South Korea) Shin Min-ha (DF)	Won						
June					(South Korea) Kim Dae-won (FW)	Won	(South Korea) Lee Gwang-yeon (GK)	Won		
August							(South Korea) Park Cheong-hyo (GK)	Nominated		
September	(South Korea) Lee You-hyeon (MF)	Nominated								

=== Round awards ===
Note : Bold players are determined the MVP of the round. Only rounds included Gangwon FC players are listed.

Date	Round	Best Eleven of the round				Team of the round
Date	Round	Forwards	Midfielders	Defenders	Goalkeeper	Team of the round
22–23 February	Round 2		(South Korea) Lee Ji-ho		(South Korea) Lee Gwang-yeon	
12–13 April	Round 8			(South Korea) Lee You-hyeon		
19–20 April	Round 9		(South Korea) Kim Kang-kook	(Montenegro) Marko Tući		
5–6 May	Round 12		(South Korea) Lee Ji-ho	(South Korea) Lee Ki-hyuk		Gangwon FC
17–18 May	Round 14		(South Korea) Cho Jin-hyuk			
23–25 May	Round 15		(South Korea) Kim Dong-hyun			
21–22 June	Round 20	(South Korea) Mo Jae-hyeon	(South Korea) Lee Sang-heon	(Montenegro) Marko Tući	(South Korea) Park Cheong-hyo	Gangwon FC
27–29 June	Round 21			(South Korea) Song Jun-seok	(South Korea) Lee Gwang-yeon	
26–27 July	Round 24			(South Korea) Hong Chul		
23–24 August	Round 27		(South Korea) Lee Ji-ho		(South Korea) Park Cheong-hyo	
30–31 August	Round 28		(South Korea) Mo Jae-hyeon			
13–14 September	Round 29	(South Korea) Kim Gun-hee	(South Korea) Lee You-hyeon			Gangwon FC
8–9 November	Round 36	(South Korea) Park Sang-hyeok	(South Korea) Mo Jae-hyeon	(Montenegro) Marko Tući		
22–23 November	Round 37	(South Korea) Park Sang-hyeok				
30 November	Round 38		(South Korea) Mo Jae-hyeon			
