= 2025 Korea Cup =

2025 Hana Bank Korea Cup

Tournament details
- Country: South Korea
- Dates: 8 March – 6 December 2025
- Teams: 58

Final positions
- Champions: Jeonbuk Hyundai Motors (6th title)
- Runners-up: Gwangju FC

Tournament statistics
- Matches played: 59
- Goals scored: 181 (3.07 per match)
- Top goal scorer: Goo Bon-cheul (2 goals)

Awards
- Best player: Park Jin-seob

The 2025 Korea Cup, known as the 2025 Hana Bank Korea Cup (Korean: 2025 하나은행 코리아컵) for sponsorship reasons, was the 30th edition of the Korea Cup. The winners of the competition could have qualified for the 2026–27 AFC Champions League Elite if they would have finished top four in the 2025 K League 1. Pohang Steelers were the defending champions, having won their sixth cup title the previous year, but were eliminated by Gimpo FC 2–1 in the round of 16.

Jeonbuk Hyundai Motors won their sixth cup title after defeating Gwangju FC 2–1 in the final after extra time, completing the Double.

== Schedule ==
The draw was held on 12 February 2025 at the Soccer Hall in Seoul. It decided all the match-ups from the first round to the fourth round (round of 16) along with the playing dates. The second draw was held on 11 June 2025, and decided all the match-ups from the quarter-finals to the final.

Round	Date	Matches	Clubs remaining	Clubs involved	New entries this round
First round	8–9 March	14	58	28	10 K3 League teams 10 K4 League teams 8 K5 League teams
Second round	22–23 March	16	44	14+18	14 K League 2 teams 4 K3 League teams
Third round	16 April	12	28	16+8	8 K League 1 teams
Round of 16	14 May	8	16	12+4	3 Champions League Elite teams 1 Champions League Two team
Quarter-finals	2 July	4	8	8	None
Semi-finals	20 and 27 August	4	4	4	None
Final	6 December	1	2	2	None

== Bracket ==
Round of 16 (Fourth round)
Suwon FC	1 (3)
Gwangju FC (p)	1 (4)
Ulsan HD	3
Incheon United	0
Gimpo FC	2
Pohang Steelers	1
Bucheon FC 1995 (a.e.t.)	3
Gimcheon Sangmu	1
Daejeon Korail	1
FC Seoul	2
Daejeon Hana Citizen	2
Jeonbuk Hyundai Motors	3
FC Anyang	1
Daegu FC	2
Gangwon FC	2
Siheung Citizen	1

Quarter-finals (Fifth round)
Gwangju FC	1
Ulsan HD	0
Gimpo FC	1
Bucheon FC 1995	3
FC Seoul	0
Jeonbuk Hyundai Motors	1
Daegu FC	1
Gangwon FC	2

Semi-finals (Sixth round)
Gwangju FC	2	2	4
Bucheon FC 1995	0	1	1
Jeonbuk Hyundai Motors	1	2	3
Gangwon FC	1	1	2

Final (Seventh round)
Gwangju FC	1
Jeonbuk Hyundai Motors (a.e.t.)	2

== First round ==
Team 1	Score	Team 2
Jinju Citizen (4)	1–0	Yeoncheon FC (4)
Dangjin Citizen (4)	1–2	Gangneung Citizen (3)
Jeonju OFC (5)	0–6	Pyeongtaek Citizen (4)
Hyochang FC (5)	0–4	Gijang United (4)
Daegu Cheongsol (5)	0–5	Pocheon Citizen (3)
Sejong SA (4)	3–0	Ulsan Citizen (3)
Yangcheon TNT (5)	0–0 (a.e.t.) (3–4 p)	Geoje Citizen (4)
Incheon Seogot SM (5)	0–9	Daejeon Korail (3)
Gunyung FC (5)	1–5	Namyangju FC (4)
Yangsan United (5)	1–2	Busan Transportation Corporation (3)
Seoul Jungnang (4)	0–3	Paju Citizen (3)
Gimhae Jaemics (5)	2–4	Chuncheon FC (3)
Yangpyeong FC (3)	1–1 (a.e.t.) (4–5 p)	Pyeongchang United (4)
Yeoju FC (3)	3–3 (a.e.t.) (5–4 p)	FC Mokpo (3)

== Second round ==
Team 1	Score	Team 2
Siheung Citizen (3)	2–2 (a.e.t.) (5–4 p)	Seongnam FC (2)
Hwaseong FC (2)	1–0 (a.e.t.)	Jinju Citizen (4)
Gangneung Citizen (3)	1–0	Chungnam Asan (2)
Ansan Greeners (2)	3–1	Pyeongtaek Citizen (4)
Gijang United (4)	0–4	Gimpo FC (2)
Cheonan City (2)	1–0	Pocheon Citizen (3)
Sejong SA (4)	3–1	Jeonnam Dragons (2)
Gimhae FC 2008 (3)	5–1 (a.e.t.)	Geoje Citizen (4)
Daejeon Korail (3)	1–0	Chungbuk Cheongju (2)
Changwon FC (3)	1–1 (a.e.t.) (3–5 p)	Namyangju FC (4)
Busan Transportation Corporation (3)	2–1	Busan IPark (2)
Gyeongju KHNP (3)	4–1	Paju Citizen (3)
Incheon United (2)	3–0	Chuncheon FC (3)
Gyeongnam FC (2)	0–3	Pyeongchang United (4)
Bucheon FC 1995 (2)	3–1	Yeoju FC (3)
Suwon Samsung Bluewings (2)	2–1	Seoul E-Land (2)

== Third round ==
Team 1	Score	Team 2
Hwaseong FC (2)	0–1	Siheung Citizen (3)
Gangneung Citizen (3)	1–2	Daejeon Hana Citizen (1)
Jeonbuk Hyundai Motors (1)	3–0 (a.e.t.)	Ansan Greeners (2)
Gimpo FC (2)	2–1	Cheonan City (2)
Sejong SA (4)	0–1	FC Anyang (1)
Daegu FC (1)	2–0	Gimhae FC 2008 (3)
Daejeon Korail (3)	3–0	Namyangju FC (4)
Busan Transportation Corporation (3)	1–2	Suwon FC (1)
Gwangju FC (1)	2–0	Gyeongju KHNP (3)
Incheon United (2)	2–1 (a.e.t.)	Pyeongchang United (4)
Bucheon FC 1995 (2)	1–0	Jeju SK (1)
Gimcheon Sangmu (1)	2–0	Suwon Samsung Bluewings (2)

== Round of 16 ==
Team 1	Score	Team 2
Gangwon FC (1)	2–1	Siheung Citizen (3)
Daejeon Hana Citizen (1)	2–3	Jeonbuk Hyundai Motors (1)
Gimpo FC (2)	2–1	Pohang Steelers (1)
FC Anyang (1)	1–2	Daegu FC (1)
Daejeon Korail (3)	1–2	FC Seoul (1)
Suwon FC (1)	1–1 (a.e.t.) (3–4 p)	Gwangju FC (1)
Ulsan HD (1)	3–0	Incheon United (2)
Bucheon FC 1995 (2)	3–1 (a.e.t.)	Gimcheon Sangmu (1)

== Quarter-finals ==
2 July 2025	Gwangju FC (1)	1–0	Ulsan HD (1)	Gwangju World Cup Stadium, Gwangju
19:00 UTC+9	Cho Sung-gwon 75'

2 July 2025	Gimpo FC (2)	1–3	Bucheon FC 1995 (2)	Gimpo Solteo Football Field, Gimpo
19:00 UTC+9	Lee Sang-hyeok 54' (o.g.)		Choi Jae-young 5'; Kim Dong-hyeon 38'; Jefferson Galego 90+7'

2 July 2025	FC Seoul (1)	0–1	Jeonbuk Hyundai Motors (1)	Seoul World Cup Stadium, Seoul
19:30 UTC+9			Song Min-kyu 87'

2 July 2025	Daegu FC (1)	1–2	Gangwon FC (1)	Daegu iM Bank Park, Daegu
19:00 UTC+9	Cesinha 61' (pen.)		Goo Bon-cheul 43'; Kim Gun-hee 48'

== Semi-finals ==
20 August 2025 First leg	Gwangju FC (1)	2–0	Bucheon FC 1995 (2)	Gwangju World Cup Stadium, Gwangju
19:00 UTC+9

27 August 2025 Second leg	Bucheon FC 1995 (2)	1–2 (1–4 agg.)	Gwangju FC (1)	Bucheon Sports Complex, Bucheon
19:00 UTC+9

20 August 2025 First leg	Jeonbuk Hyundai Motors (1)	1–1	Gangwon FC (1)	Jeonju World Cup Stadium, Jeonju
19:00 UTC+9

27 August 2025 Second leg	Gangwon FC (1)	1–2 (2–3 agg.)	Jeonbuk Hyundai Motors (1)	Gangneung Stadium, Gangneung
19:00 UTC+9

== Final ==
6 December 2025
13:30 UTC+9

Gwangju FC	1–2 (a.e.t.)	Jeonbuk Hyundai Motors
Friðjónsson 70'		Lee Dong-jun 45+4'; Lee Seung-woo 105+1'

Seoul World Cup Stadium, Seoul
Attendance: 29,410
Referee: Park Byeong-jin
