= Kim Jin-hyuk =

South Korean footballer (born 1993)

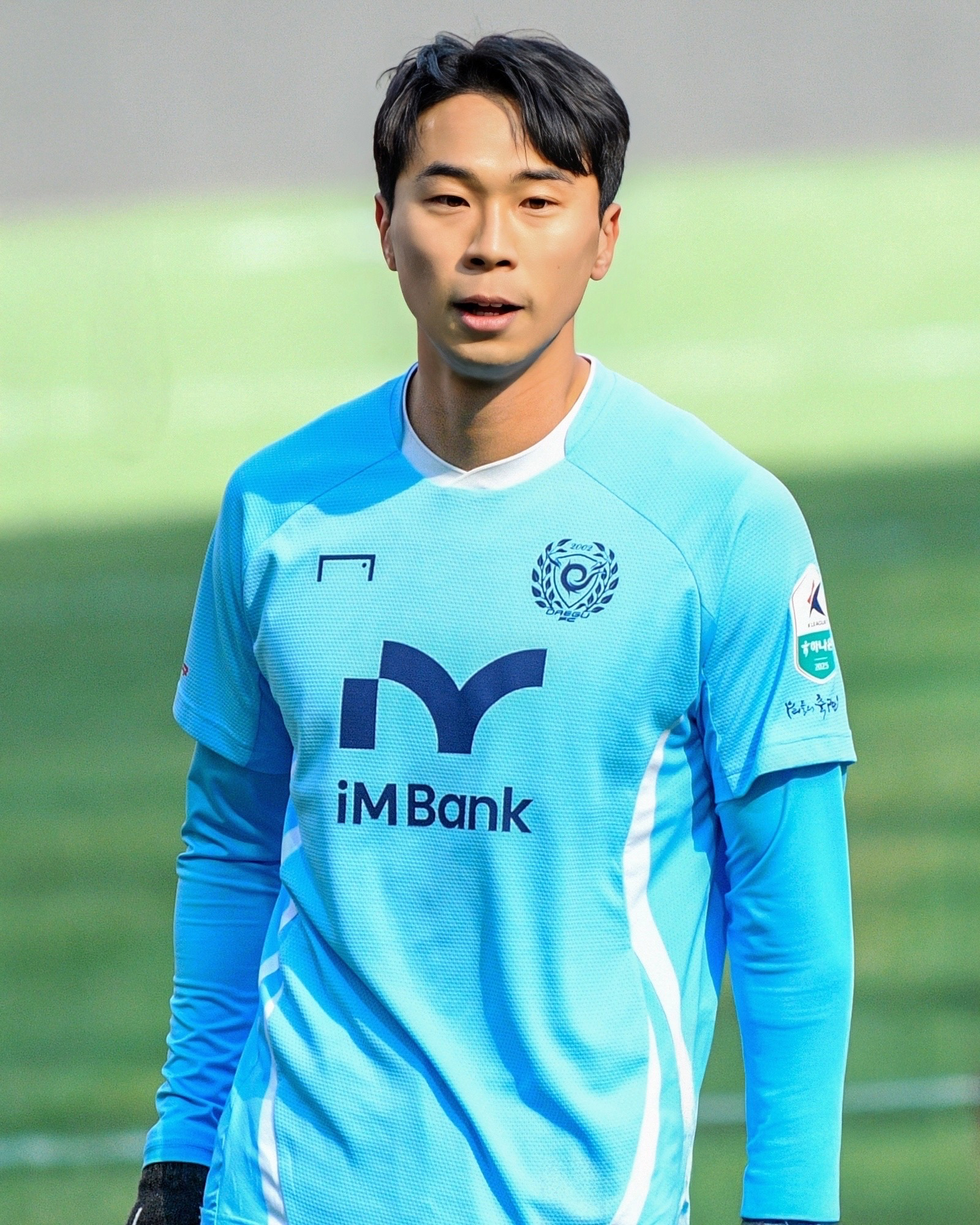
- Kim in 2025

Personal information
- Date of birth: 3 June 1993 (age 33)
- Place of birth: South Korea
- Height: 1.85 m (6 ft 1 in)
- Positions: Forward; centre-back

Team information
- Current team: Busan IPark (on loan from Daegu FC)
- Number: 4

Youth career
- 2012–2014: Soongsil University

Senior career*
Years	Team	Apps	(Gls)
2015–	Daegu FC	215	(19)
2016	→ Ulsan Hyundai Mipo (loan)	22	(1)
2019–2020	Sangju Sangmu (army)	28	(2)
2026–	→ Busan IPark (loan)	15	(3)
- * Club domestic league appearances and goals as of 5 August 2026

- Kim Jin-hyuk
- Hangul: 김진혁
- Hanja: 金鎮赫
- RR: Gim Jinhyeok
- MR: Kim Chinhyŏk

Kim Jin-hyuk (Korean: 김진혁; born 3 June 1993) is a South Korean footballer who plays as a defender for Busan IPark, on loan from Daegu FC.

== Career ==
Kim, born 3 June 1993, joined K League 2 side Daegu FC in January 2015. He plays as a forward. For the 2016 season, he was loaned to Ulsan Dolphins, which played in the Korea National League and helped the club win the championship that year.

== Career statistics ==
=== Club ===
As of 23 May 2021

Club performance			League		Cup		Continental		Total	
Club	Season	League	Apps	Goals	Apps	Goals	Apps	Goals	Apps	Goals
Daegu FC	2015	K League 2	12	0	0	0	—		12	0
Ulsan Hyundai Mipo (loan)	2016	Korea National League	22	1	1	0	—		23	1
Daegu FC	2017	K League 1	32	4	1	0	—		33	4
Daegu FC	2018	K League 1	25	1	3	1	—		28	2
Daegu FC	2019	K League 1	6	4	1	0	2	0	9	4
Sangju Sangmu (army)	2019	K League 1	9	1	2	1	—		11	2
Sangju Sangmu (army)	2020	K League 1	19	1	0	0	—		19	1
Daegu FC	2021	K League 1	13	5	0	0	0	0	13	5
Career Total			138	17	8	2	2	0	148	19

== Honors and awards ==
=== Player ===
Ulsan Dolphins

- Korea National League Winners (1): 2016

Daegu FC

- Korean FA Cup Winners (1): 2018
