= Kim Jong-pil (footballer, born 1955) =

South Korean footballer

Kim Jong-pil 김종필
Personal information
- Date of birth: 11 March 1955 (age 71)
- Place of birth: South Korea
- Height: 1.75 m (5 ft 9 in)
- Position: Defender

Team information
- Current team: Sejong SA (manager)

Youth career
- 1972–1974: Anyang Technical High School

Senior career*
Years	Team	Apps	(Gls)
?–1979	Korea Development Bank FC		
1980–?	Saehan Motors / Daewoo FC		

Managerial career
- 1983–1990: Anyang Middle School
- 1990–2004: Anyang Technical High School
- 2005–2013: Hongik University
- 2011: South Korea Universiade football team
- 2013–2015: Chungju Hummel
- 2017: FC Anyang
- 2021–2022: Chungju Citizen FC
- 2023: FC Chungju
- 2025–: Sejong SA
- * Club domestic league appearances and goals

- Kim Jong-pil
- Hangul: 김종필
- Hanja: 金鍾弼
- RR: Gim Jongpil
- MR: Kim Chongp'il

Kim Jong-pil (Korean: 김종필; Korean pronunciation: [kim.dʑoŋ.pʰiɭ]; born 11 March 1955) is a South Korean former football defender and the current manager of Sejong SA FC.

He played for Korea Development Bank FC and Saehan Motors / Daewoo FC.

== Managerial career ==
In July 2013, he was appointed as manager of Chungju Hummel FC, and in November 2016, as manager of FC Anyang.

Kim managed Chungju Citizen FC from 2021 until the club disbanded in 2022, and was subsequently announced as manager of the newly established FC Chungju.

In 2024, Kim was appointed as the manager of Sejong SA, a new team in the K4 League.
