= 2016 Korea National League =

Incheon International Airport Korea National League
- Season: 2016
- Dates: 19 March – 2 November 2016
- Champions: Hyundai Mipo Dockyard (7th title)
- Matches: 90
- Goals: 324 (3.6 per match)
- Best Player: Park Chung-hyo
- Top goalscorer: Kwak Chul-ho (16 goals)

The 2016 Korea National League, also known as the Incheon International Airport National League 2016 due to the sponsorship of Incheon International Airport, was the 14th season of the Korea National League, the third tier of South Korea's football league system. Each of the ten clubs played three times against every other club in the regular season, and the top four clubs of the regular season qualified for post-season playoffs.

Hyundai Mipo Dockyard won their seventh league title after winning the two-legged final, but they dissolved their football club after the end of the season due to financial difficulties. Yongin City also dissolved their football club after being disappointed with poor results of the club.

Gangneung City goalkeeper Park Chung-hyo became the first player to win the MVP award without the league title.

== Teams ==
Locations of the 2016 Korea National League clubs

Team	Location	Stadium
Busan Transportation Corporation	Busan	Busan Gudeok Stadium
Changwon City	Changwon	Changwon Football Center
Cheonan City	Cheonan	Cheonan Stadium
Daejeon Korail	Daejeon	Daejeon Hanbat Stadium
Gangneung City	Gangneung	Gangneung Stadium
Gimhae City	Gimhae	Gimhae Stadium
Gyeongju KHNP	Gyeongju	Gyeongju Civic Stadium
Hyundai Mipo Dockyard	Ulsan	Ulsan Stadium
Mokpo City	Mokpo	Mokpo International Football Center
Yongin City	Yongin	Yongin Football Center

== Regular season ==
=== League table ===
Pos	Team	Pld	W	D	L	GF	GA	GD	Pts	Qualification or relegation
1	Gangneung City	27	16	8	3	33	17	+16	56	Qualification for the playoffs final
2	Hyundai Mipo Dockyard	27	13	5	9	35	31	+4	44	Qualification for the playoffs semi-final
3	Gyeongju KHNP	27	11	9	7	43	31	+12	42	Qualification for the playoffs first round
4	Changwon City	27	10	9	8	33	29	+4	39	Qualification for the playoffs first round
5	Cheonan City	27	10	9	8	34	31	+3	39	
6	Gimhae City	27	8	10	9	37	34	+3	34	
7	Daejeon Korail	27	8	10	9	33	41	−8	34	
8	Busan Transportation Corporation	27	6	10	11	26	36	−10	28	
9	Mokpo City	27	6	9	12	20	26	−6	27	
10	Yongin City	27	4	7	16	30	48	−18	19	

Source: Korea National League
Rules for classification: 1) Points; 2) Goal difference; 3) Goals scored.

=== Positions by matchday ===
Team ╲ Round	1	2	3	4	5	6	7	8	9	10	11	12	13	14	15	16	17	18	19	20	21	22	23	24	25	26	27
Gangneung City	6	8	2	2	1	2	1	1	1	1	1	2	2	1	1	1	1	1	1	1	1	1	1	1	1	1	1
Ulsan Hyundai Mipo Dolphin	9	4	6	4	5	3	3	2	2	2	2	3	3	3	3	3	2	3	3	2	3	3	2	3	3	3	2
Gyeongju KHNP	1	2	1	3	2	1	2	3	3	3	3	1	1	2	2	2	3	2	2	3	2	2	3	2	2	2	3
Changwon City	6	8	2	5	6	8	5	5	8	5	4	4	5	5	6	5	4	4	5	4	5	5	4	4	4	5	4
Cheonan City	4	7	5	1	4	6	7	8	6	7	6	7	7	7	7	8	8	7	8	8	8	7	7	6	7	4	5
Gimhae City	2	4	8	8	9	9	9	9	9	9	7	5	4	4	4	4	5	6	4	6	6	6	6	7	6	7	6
Daejeon Korail	4	1	4	6	8	7	8	7	5	6	8	8	8	8	5	6	6	5	6	5	4	4	5	5	5	6	7
Busan Transportation Corporation	9	6	8	9	7	5	4	4	6	8	9	9	9	9	9	7	7	8	7	7	7	8	8	8	8	8	8
Mokpo City	2	2	7	7	3	4	6	6	4	4	5	6	6	6	8	9	9	10	10	10	9	9	9	9	9	9	9
Yongin City	8	10	10	10	10	10	10	10	10	10	10	10	10	10	10	10	10	9	9	9	10	10	10	10	10	10	10

Source: Korea National League
= Leaders; = Qualification for the playoffs

== Championship playoffs ==
First round
3	Gyeongju KHNP	2
4	Changwon City	0

Semi-final
2	Hyundai Mipo Dockyard (Note: Hyundai Mipo Dockyard advanced to the final due to a higher ranking in the regular season.)	1
1R	Gyeongju KHNP	1

Final
SF	Hyundai Mipo Dockyard	1	1	2
1	Gangneung City	0	1	1

== See also ==
- 2016 in South Korean football
- 2016 Korea National League Championship
- 2016 Korean FA Cup
