= Shin Min-ha =

South Korean footballer (born 2005)

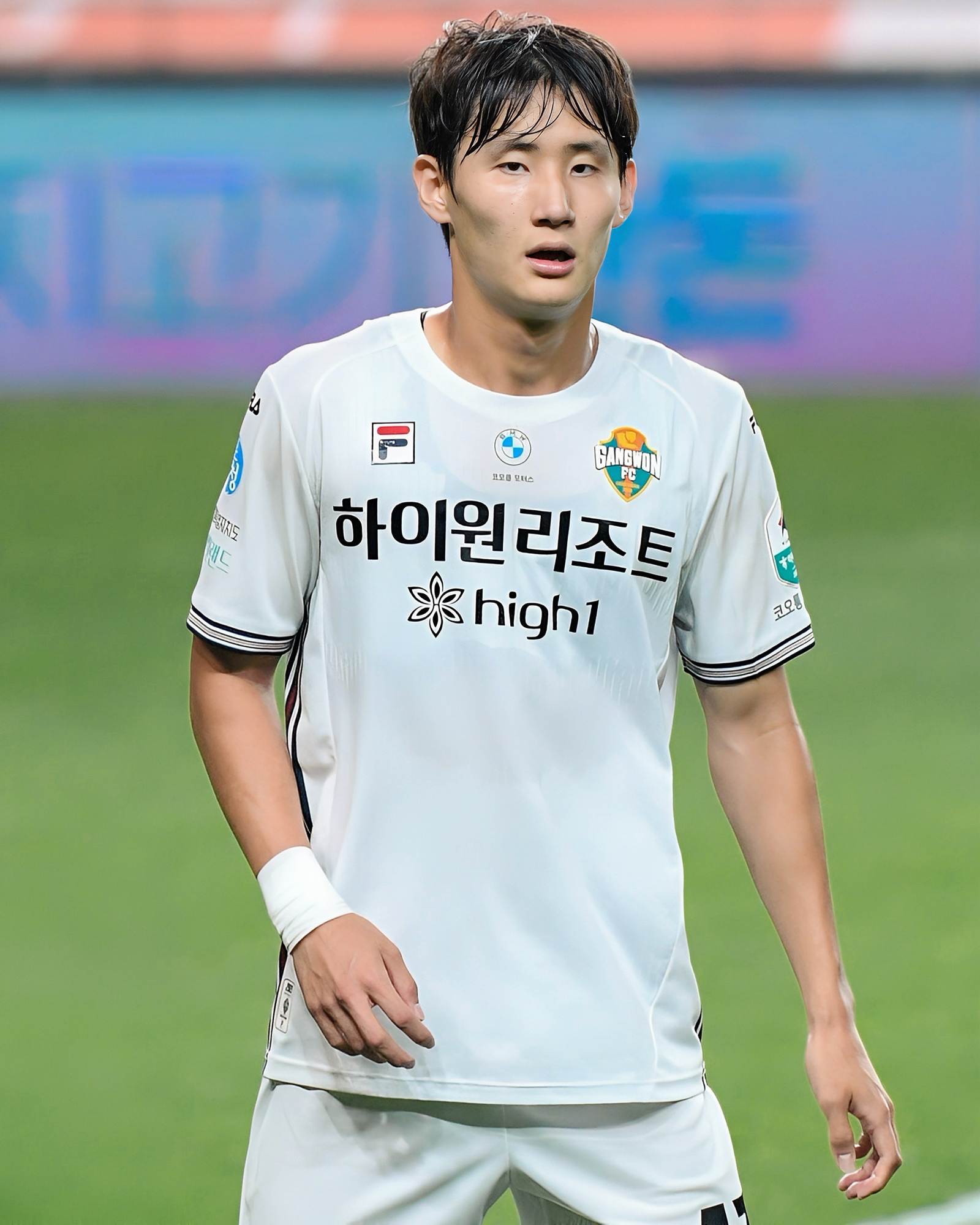
- Shin with Gangwon FC in 2025

Personal information
- Full name: Shin Min-ha
- Date of birth: 15 September 2005 (age 21)
- Place of birth: Chungju, South Korea
- Height: 1.86 m (6 ft 1 in)
- Position: Centre-back

Team information
- Current team: Gangwon FC
- Number: 47

Youth career
- 2018–2023: Yongin Football Center

Senior career*
Years	Team	Apps	(Gls)
2024–	Gangwon FC	72	(2)

International career^{‡}
2024–2025	South Korea U20	16	(4)
2025–	South Korea U23	16	(3)
Medal record
Men's football
Representing South Korea
Asian Games
Gold medal – first place	2026 Aichi–Nagoya
Korean name
Hangul	신민하
Hanja	信敏河
RR	Sin Minha
MR	Sin Minha
- * Club domestic league appearances and goals as of 8 November 2026 ‡ National team caps and goals as of 3 October 2026

Shin Min-ha (Korean: 신민하; born 15 September 2005) is a South Korean footballer currently playing as a centre-back for Gangwon FC.

== Club career ==
Shin started his career with Yongin Football Center youth academy. In 2024. he joined Gangwon FC as a first professional career.

== International career ==
He was called up to the South Korea U20 team in August 2024, and participated qualification matches and AFC U-20 Asian Cup in February 2025. He participated in the 2025 FIFA U-20 World Cup.

== Career statistics ==
=== Club ===
As of 8 November 2026.

Club	Season	League			National Cup		Continental		Total	
Club	Season	Division	Apps	Goals	Apps	Goals	Apps	Goals	Apps	Goals
Gangwon FC	2024	K League 1	20	0	2	0	0	0	22	0
Gangwon FC	2025	K League 1	29	1	2	0	4 (Note: Appearances in AFC Champions League Elite)	0	35	1
Gangwon FC	2026	K League 1	23	1	1	0	5 (Note: four appearances in AFC Champions League Elite, one appearance in AFC Champions League Two)	0	29	1
Gangwon FC	Total		72	2	5	0	9	0	86	2
Career total			72	2	5	0	9	0	86	2

== Honours ==
Gangwon FC

- K League 1 runner-up: 2024

Individual

- K League Young Player of the Month: April 2025

South Korea U23

- Asian Games: 2026
