= Park Chung-hyo =

South Korean footballer

Park Chung-Hyo
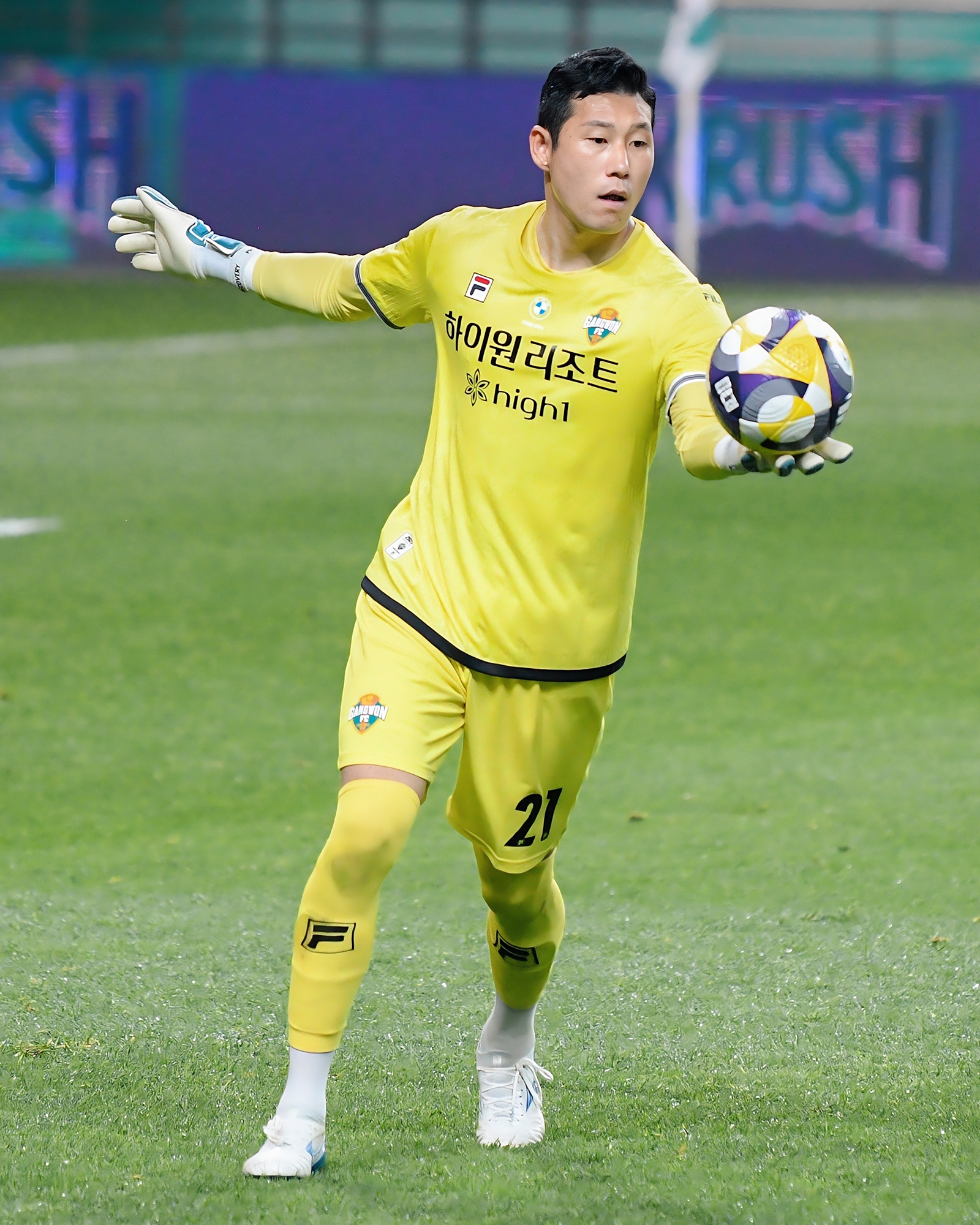
- Park in 2025

Personal information
- Full name: Park Chung-Hyo
- Date of birth: 13 February 1990 (age 36)
- Place of birth: South Korea
- Height: 1.90 m (6 ft 3 in)
- Position: Goalkeeper

Team information
- Current team: Gangwon FC
- Number: 1

College career
Years	Team	Apps	(Gls)
2009-2012	Yonsei University		

Senior career*
Years	Team	Apps	(Gls)
2013–2014	Gyeongnam FC	10	(0)
2014	→ Chungju Hummel (loan)	8	(0)
2015	Chungju Hummel	4	(0)
2016	Gangneung City	22	(0)
2017	Suwon FC	4	(0)
2018–2020	Pocheon Citizen	28	(0)
2021	Yangju Citizen	28	(0)
2022	Busan Transportation Corporation	30	(0)
2023	Gimpo Citizen	33	(0)
2024–	Gangwon FC	49	(0)
- * Club domestic league appearances and goals as of 3 August 2026

Park Chung-Hyo (Korean: 박청효; born 13 February 1990) is a South Korean footballer who plays as goalkeeper for Gangwon FC in K League 1.

== Career ==
He was selected by Gyeongnam FC in the 2013 K League draft. He played for K League 2 side Chungju Hummel, Suwon FC and Gimpo FC, He also played in K3 League and K4 League teams, such as Pocheon Citizen, Yangju Citizen and Busan Transportation Corp. Before K3 and K4, also played in National League (now defunct league) side Gangneung Citizen and awarded MVP of the season. From 2024 season, he moved to Gangwon FC.

== Career statistics ==
As of 3 August 2026.

Club	Season	League			National Cup		Continental		Other		Total	
Club	Season	Division	Apps	Goals	Apps	Goals	Apps	Goals	Apps	Goals	Apps	Goals
Gyeongnam FC	2013	K League 1	10	0	1	0	—		—		11	0
Gyeongnam FC	2014	K League 1	0	0	0	0	—		—		0	0
Gyeongnam FC	Total		10	0	1	0	—		—		11	0
Chungju Hummel (loan)	2014	K League 2	8	0	—		—		—		8	0
Chungju Hummel	2015	K League 2	4	0	1	0	—		—		5	0
Chungju Hummel	Total		12	0	1	0	—		—		13	0
Gangneung City	2016	Korea National League	22	0	2	0	—		5 (Note: Two appearances in National League Championship playoffs, three appearances in National League Cup)	0	29	0
Suwon FC	2017	K League 2	4	0	0	0	—		—		4	0
Pocheon Citizen	2018	K3 League	10	0	1	0	—		2 (Note: Appearances in K3 League Advanced Championship playoffs.)	1	13	1
Pocheon Citizen	2019	K3 League	6	0	2	0	—		—		8	0
Pocheon Citizen	2020	K4 League	12	0	0	0	—		—		12	0
Pocheon Citizen	Total		28	0	3	0	—		2	1	33	1
Yangju Citizen	2021	K3 League	28	0	5	0	—		—		33	0
Busan Transportation Corp.	2022	K3 League	30	0	3	0	—		—		33	0
Gimpo Citizen	2023	K League 2	33	0	1	0	—		3	0	37	0
Gangwon FC	2024	K League 1	9	0	1	0	—		—		10	0
Gangwon FC	2025	K League 1	19	0	2	0	4 (Note: Appearances in AFC Champions League Elite)	0	—		25	0
Gangwon FC	2025	K League 1	21	0	0	0	4	0	—		25	0
Gangwon FC	Total		49	0	3	0	8	0	—		60	0
Career total			216	0	19	0	8	0	10	1	253	1
