= Sejong SA FC =

Association football club in South Korea

Sejong SA
- Full name: Sejong SA Football Club 세종 SA 축구단
- Founded: December 2024; 20 months ago
- Ground: Sejong Civic Stadium
- Capacity: 966
- Owner: Kwon Hyuk-hoon
- Chairman: Seok Won-woong
- Manager: Kim Jong-pil
- League: K4 League
- Website: sejongsa.co.kr

Sejong SA FC (Korean: 세종 SA FC) is a South Korean football club based in the city of Sejong. The club was founded in December 2024 and competes in the K4 League, the fourth tier of men's football in South Korea.

== History ==
Sejong SA FC was founded in December 2024 and began recruiting players to compete in the 2025 K4 League.

=== Inaugural Season ===
They made their league debut on 22 February 2025 in an away match against Namyangju Citizen, which they lost 2–1. They played their first home match the following week against Daegu FC B, resulting in a 1-3 loss. They struggled to get off the mark and after the first 5 matches, their only point came from a draw against Seoul Jungnang FC. Sejong had to wait until their tenth match for their first league victory, beating title contenders Geoje Citizen.

The club's first ever home victory came in the first round of the Korea Cup when they defeated K3 League side Ulsan Citizen 3-0. They went on to defeat K League 2 club Jeonnam Dragons FC 3-1 in the second round. They were knocked out of the competition in round 3, losing 0-1 at home to K League 1 side FC Anyang.

== Squad ==
As of 23 February 2025

Note: Flags indicate national team as defined under FIFA eligibility rules; some limited exceptions apply. Players may hold more than one non-FIFA nationality.

No.	Pos.	Nation	Player
1	GK	KOR	Shim Min
3	DF	KOR	Heo Jin-seo
4	DF	KOR	Kang Byung-joon
5	DF	KOR	Lee Min-hyung
6	MF	KOR	Jang Sung-jae
7	FW	KOR	Kim Ha-jun
8	MF	KOR	Yoon Yong-ho
9	FW	KOR	Jung Si-hoo
10	MF	KOR	Kim Se-yoon
11	DF	KOR	Kim Jun-bae
12	DF	KOR	Han Ye-il
13	GK	KOR	Lee Jae-hoon
16	MF	KOR	Kim Sung-hyuk
17	MF	KOR	Hong Kwang-sub
18	FW	KOR	Um Ha-eun
19	FW	KOR	Yoo Jung-wan
20	DF	KOR	Kim Doo-ran
21	MF	KOR	Lee Seung-jun
22	DF	KOR	Jo Han-gyeol
23	MF	KOR	Bae Jung-ho

No.	Pos.	Nation	Player
24	MF	KOR	Kim Ji-sung
26	MF	KOR	Choi Si-on
27	DF	KOR	Jang Kyung-ho
29	DF	KOR	Hong Hae-sung
30	FW	KOR	Kim Chang-un
31	GK	KOR	Park Won-cheol
32	DF	KOR	Lee Eun-soo
33	DF	KOR	Lee Jae-hoon
37	DF	KOR	Kim Jun-sub
39	MF	KOR	Kyung Hyun-ho
40	MF	KOR	Lee Yong-hyuk
44	DF	KOR	Lee Young-hyun
46	MF	KOR	Hong Sung-moo
47	FW	KOR	Jeon Jae-min
55	DF	KOR	Won Ki-yeon
73	FW	KOR	Kim Tae-yoon
77	FW	KOR	Seung Jun-seo
96	FW	KOR	Kim Jae-cheol
99	MF	KOR	Choi Jun-young

== Coaching staff ==
- Technical director: (South Korea) Won- Woong Seok
- Team manager: (South Korea) Kim Jong-pil
- Head coach: (South Korea) Park Hyun-chan
- Assistant head coach: (England) Lee Roberts
- Assistant head coach: (South Korea) Lee Sang Jin
- Fitness coach: (South Korea) Lee Jiwon
- Goalkeeper coach: (South Korea) Park Junseo
- Team analyst: (South Korea) Dong Hyeon Seol
- Doctor: (South Korea) Shin Jae Won
- Media officer : (South Korea) Kim Hychoi
