= Lee Gwang-yeon =

South Korean footballer (born 1999)

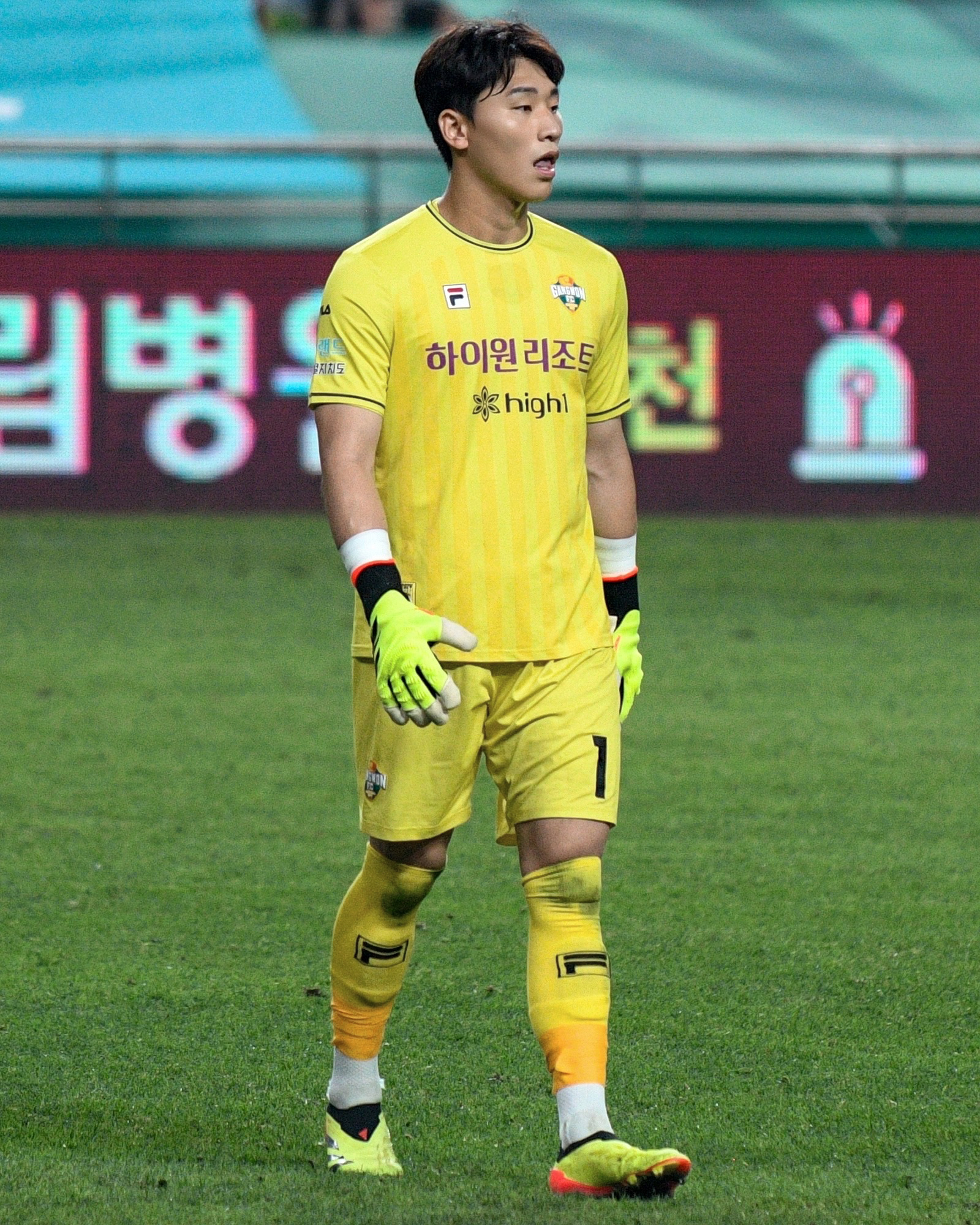
- Lee in 2024

Personal information
- Full name: Lee Gwang-yeon
- Date of birth: 11 September 1999 (age 27)
- Place of birth: Yesan, Chungcheongnam-do, South Korea
- Height: 1.85 m (6 ft 1 in)
- Position: Goalkeeper

Team information
- Current team: Seongnam FC
- Number: 1

Youth career
- 2018: Incheon National University

Senior career*
Years	Team	Apps	(Gls)
2019–2025	Gangwon FC	91	(0)
2021–2023	→ Gangwon FC B	6	(0)
2026–	Seongnam FC	14	(0)

International career^{‡}
2017-2019	South Korea U20	18	(0)
2020-2023	South Korea U23	12 (Note: Includes one appearance against another KFA team.)	(0)
Medal record
Men's football
Representing South Korea
Asian Games
Gold medal – first place	2022 Hangzhou	Team
FIFA U-20 World Cup
Runner-up	2019 Poland
- * Club domestic league appearances and goals as of 6 August 2026 ‡ National team caps and goals as of 4 October 2023 (UTC)

- Lee Gwang-yeon
- Hangul: 이광연
- RR: I Gwangyeon
- MR: I Kwangyŏn

Lee Gwang-yeon (Korean: 이광연; born 11 September 1999) is a South Korean footballer currently playing as a goalkeeper for Seongnam FC.

== Career statistics ==
=== Club ===
As of 9 December 2025.

Appearances and goals by club, season and competition
Club	Season	League			Cup		Continental		Other		Total	
Club	Season	Division	Apps	Goals	Apps	Goals	Apps	Goals	Apps	Goals	Apps	Goals
Gangwon FC	2019	K League 1	8	0	0	0	-		-		8	0
Gangwon FC	2020	K League 1	11	0	2	0	-		-		13	0
Gangwon FC	2021	K League 1	4	0	0	0	-		2 (Note: Appearance in K League Promotion-Relegation play-offs)	0	6	0
Gangwon FC	2022	K League 1	2	0	0	0	-		-		2	0
Gangwon FC	2023	K League 1	18	0	1	0	-		2	0	21	0
Gangwon FC	2024	K League 1	28	0	1	0	-		-		29	0
Gangwon FC	2025	K League 1	20	0	2	0	2	0	-		24	0
Gangwon FC	Total		91	0	6	0	2	0	4	0	103	0
Gangwon FC B	2021	K4 League	5	0	-		-		-		5	0
Gangwon FC B	2023	K4 League	1	0	-		-		-		1	0
Gangwon FC B	Total		6	0	-		-		-		6	0
Career total			97	0	6	0	2	0	4	0	109	0

== Honours ==
Gangwon FC

- K League 1 runner-up : 2024

South Korea U23

- Asian Games: 2022

South Korea U20

- FIFA U-20 World Cup runner-up: 2019
