= Bruno Oliveira (footballer, born 1996) =

Brazilian footballer (born 1996

Personal information
- Full name: Bruno de Oliveira Souza
- Date of birth: 9 June 1996 (age 30)
- Place of birth: Paiçandu, Brazil
- Height: 1.87 m (6 ft 2 in)
- Positions: Centre-back; left-back

Team information
- Current team: Ballkani
- Number: 96

Senior career*
Years	Team	Apps	(Gls)
–2017	Portuguesa	2	(0)
2017	São Paulo-RS		
2018–2019	Central	14	(1)
2019–2020	Brasiliense		
2020–2021	Lemense		
2021–2022	São Joseense	11	(1)
2022–2023	Široki Brijeg	23	(0)
2023–2024	Velež	12	(0)
2024–2025	Gwangju FC	11	(0)
2025–2026	Gangwon FC	0	(0)
2026–	Ballkani	5	(0)
- * Club domestic league appearances and goals as of 9 May 2026

Bruno de Oliveira Souza (born 9 June 1996) is a Brazilian professional footballer who plays as a centre-back or left-back for Kosovo Superleague club Ballkani.

== Career ==
Oliveira started his career with Brazilian side Portuguesa, where he made two league appearances and scored zero goals. The same year, he signed for Brazilian side São Paulo-RS, before signing for Brazilian side Central in 2018, where he made fourteen league appearances and scored one goal. One year later, he signed for Brazilian side Brasiliense. Subsequently, he signed for Brazilian side Lemense in 2020. Following his stint there, he signed for Brazilian side São Joseense in 2021, where he made eleven league appearances and scored one goal.

Ahead of the 2022–23 season, he signed for Bosnia and Herzegovina side Široki Brijeg, where he made twenty-three league appearances and scored zero goals. Brazilian news website Universo Online wrote in 2022 that he "proven himself well-adapted to the new environment, so much so that he was already named to the Bosnian national team for the first two rounds of the Bosnian championship" while playing for the club. During the summer of 2023, he signed for Bosnia and Herzegovina side Velež, where he made twelve league appearances and scored zero goals. Six months later, he signed for South Korean side Gwangju FC, where he made eleven league appearances and scored zero goals. Afterwards, he signed for South Korean side Gangwon FC in 2025. After end of 2025 season, Gangwon FC released him.

== Style of play ==
Oliveira plays as a defender. Left-footed, he is known for his speed, passing ability, and heading ability.

== Career statistics ==
As of match played 20 August 2025

Appearances and goals by club, season and competition
Club	Season	League			State league		National cup		Continental		Other		Total	
Club	Season	Division	Apps	Goals	Apps	Goals	Apps	Goals	Apps	Goals	Apps	Goals	Apps	Goals
São Joseense	2022	Paranaense	—		11	1	—		—		—		11	1
Široki Brijeg	2022–23	Bosnian Premier League	23	0	—		1	0	—		—		24	0
Velež	2023–24	Bosnian Premier League	12	0	—		2	0	—		—		14	0
Gwangju FC	2024	K League 1	4	0	—		1	0	—		—		5	0
Gwangju FC	2025	K League 1	6	0	—		0	0	1	0	—		7	0
Gwangju FC	Total		10	0	—		1	0	1	0	—		12	0
Gangwon FC	2025	K League 1	0	0	—		1	0	—		—		1	0
Career Total			45	0	11	1	5	0	1	0	0	0	62	1
