= Mo Jae-hyeon =

South Korean footballer (born 1996)

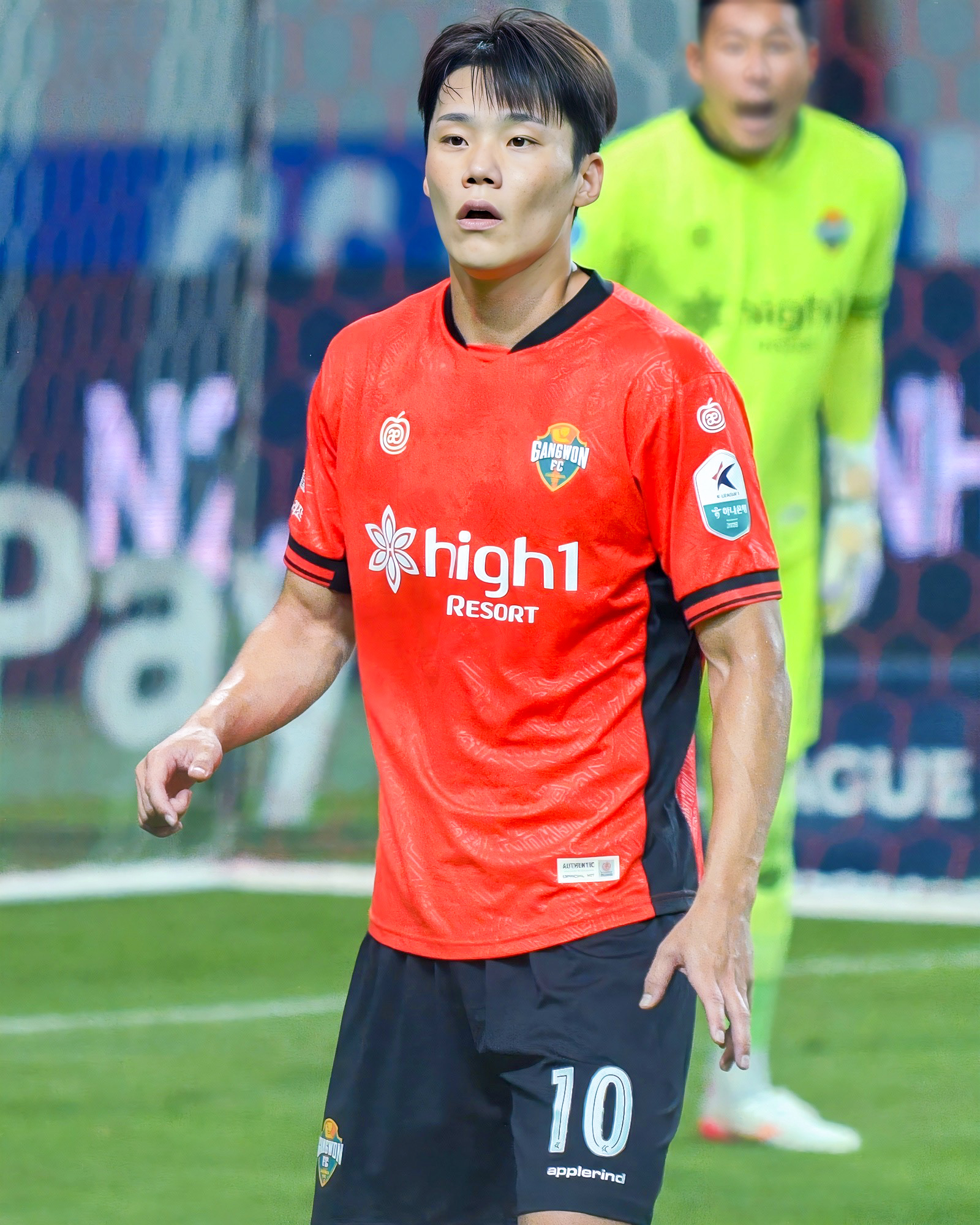
- Mo in 2026

Personal information
- Date of birth: 24 September 1996 (age 30)
- Place of birth: Mokpo, Jeonnam, South Korea
- Height: 1.84 m (6 ft 0 in)
- Position: Winger

Team information
- Current team: Gangwon FC
- Number: 10

Senior career*
Years	Team	Apps	(Gls)
2017–2020	Suwon FC	53	(6)
2019	→ FC Anyang (loan)	10	(3)
2021	FC Anyang	32	(5)
2022–2025	Gyeongnam FC	63	(11)
2024–2025	→ Gimcheon Sangmu (draft)	38	(5)
2025–	Gangwon FC	34	(7)

International career^{‡}
2025–	South Korea	2	(0)
- * Club domestic league appearances and goals as of 17 May 2026 ‡ National team caps and goals as of 11 July 2025

Mo Jae-hyeon (Korean: 모재현; born 24 September 1996) is a South Korean professional footballer who plays as a winger for Gangwon FC and the South Korea national team.

== Club career ==
Before the 2017 season, Mo signed for Korean second division side Suwon FC, where he made 53 league appearances and scored 6 goals.

== International career ==
On 26 June 2025, He was called up to the South Korea national team for the first time due to the entry list for 2025 EAFF E-1 Football Championship has been expanded from 23 to 26, adding three players to the existing roster.

== Career statistics ==
=== Club ===
As of match played 17 May 2026

Appearances and goals by club, season and competition
Club	Season	League			Cup		Continental		Other		Total	
Club	Season	Division	Apps	Goals	Apps	Goals	Apps	Goals	Apps	Goals	Apps	Goals
Suwon FC	2017	K League 2	15	3	0	0	—		—		15	3
Suwon FC	2018	K League 2	20	1	2	0	—		—		22	1
Suwon FC	2019	K League 2	1	0	1	0	—		—		2	0
Suwon FC	2020	K League 2	17	2	0	0	—		1 (Note: Appearances in K League promotion play-offs)	0	18	2
Suwon FC	Total		53	6	3	0	—		1	0	57	6
FC Anyang (loan)	2019	K League 2	10	3	—		—		2	0	12	3
FC Anyang	2021	K League 2	32	5	2	2	—		1	0	35	7
Gyeongnam FC	2022	K League 2	33	5	0	0	—		2	1	35	6
Gyeongnam FC	2023	K League 2	30	6	0	0	—		—		30	6
Gyeongnam FC	Total		63	11	0	0	—		2	1	65	12
Gimcheon Sangmu (draft)	2024	K League 1	25	4	1	0	—		—		26	4
Gimcheon Sangmu (draft)	2025	K League 1	13	1	1	0	—		—		14	1
Gimcheon Sangmu (draft)	Total		38	5	2	0	—		—		40	5
Gangwon FC	2025	K League 1	19	5	1	0	4 (Note: Appearances in AFC Champions League Elite)	2	—		24	7
Gangwon FC	2026	K League 1	15	2	0	0	4	0	—		19	2
Gangwon FC	Total		34	7	1	0	8	2	—		43	9
Career total			230	37	8	2	8	2	6	1	252	42

== Honours ==
Individual

- K League 2 Best XI: 2023
