= Lee Dong-jun (footballer) =

South Korean footballer (born 1997)

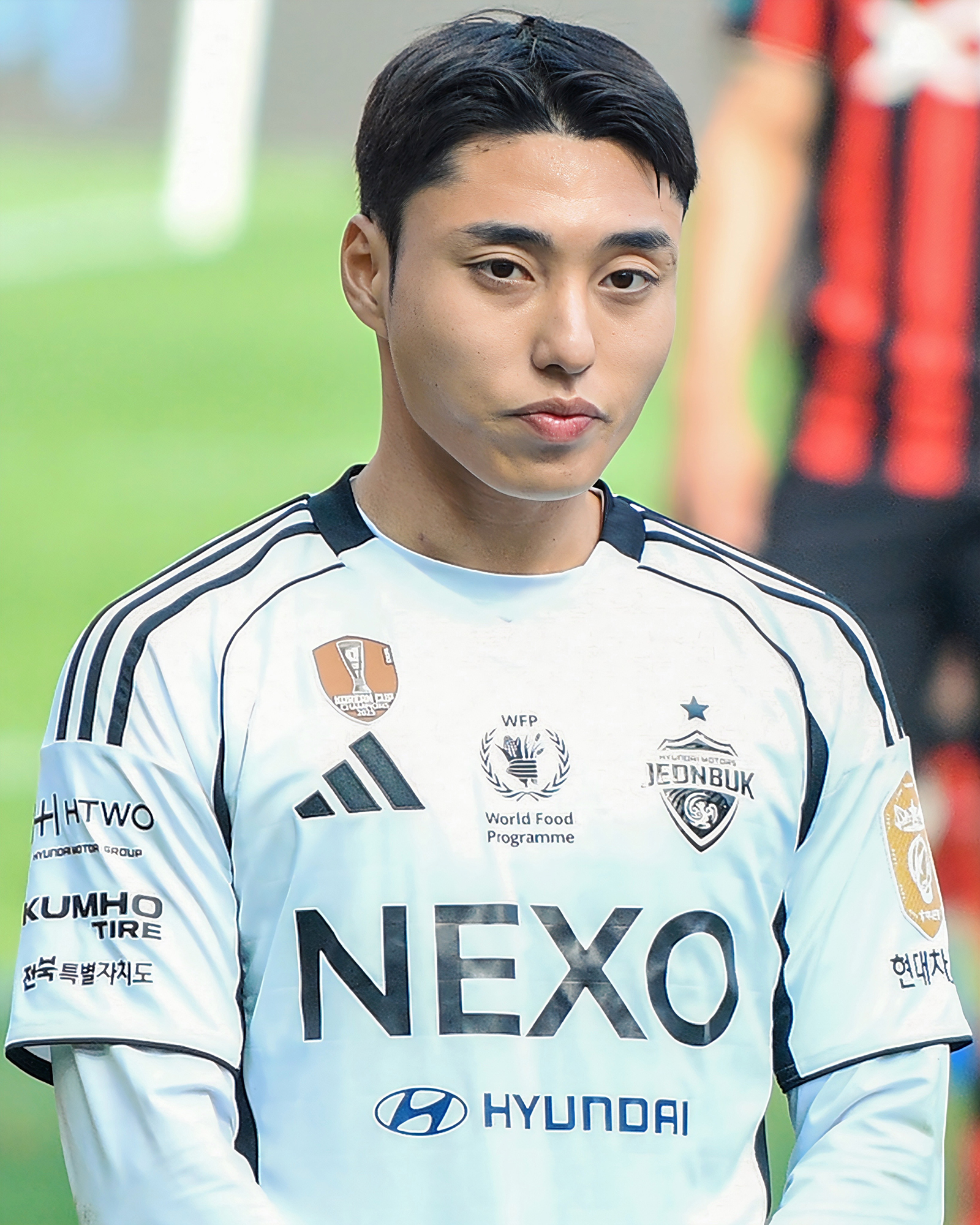
- Lee in 2026

Personal information
- Date of birth: 1 February 1997 (age 29)
- Place of birth: Busan, South Korea
- Height: 1.73 m (5 ft 8 in)
- Position: Winger

Team information
- Current team: Jeonbuk Hyundai Motors
- Number: 7

Youth career
- 2009–2014: Busan IPark (Note: Played for Silla Middle School from 2009 to 2011, and Gaesung High School from 2012 to 2014, which were academies of Busan IPark.)

College career
Years	Team	Apps	(Gls)
2015–2016	Soongsil University		

Senior career*
Years	Team	Apps	(Gls)
2017–2020	Busan IPark	92	(22)
2021	Ulsan Hyundai	32	(11)
2022	Hertha BSC	4	(0)
2023–	Jeonbuk Hyundai Motors	53	(6)
2024–2025	→ Gimcheon Sangmu (draft)	37	(6)

International career^{‡}
2015–2016	South Korea U20	22 (Note: Includes four appearances and one goal against non-national teams.)	(8)
2019–2021	South Korea U23	19	(7)
2021–	South Korea	4	(0)
Medal record
Representing South Korea
Men's football
AFC U-23 Championship
Winner	2020 Thailand
- * Club domestic league appearances and goals as of 3 August 2026 ‡ National team caps and goals as of 1 February 2022

Lee Dong-jun (Korean: 이동준; born 1 February 1997) is a South Korean professional footballer who plays as a winger for K League 1 club Jeonbuk Hyundai Motors.

== Club career ==
=== Busan IPark ===
On 21 February 2017, Lee signed with K League 2 club Busan IPark. On 25 March, he made his professional debut in a 1–0 defeat to Bucheon FC 1995. He was primarily used as a substitute for his first two years at the club.

During the 2019 season, Lee became Busan's key player under new manager Cho Deok-je, appearing in all 36 matches including 32 matches as a starter. While leading the club to a second-place finish, he had 13 goals and seven assists, and won eight penalties. He was named the K League 2 Most Valuable Player. Afterwards, Busan succeeded in promoting to the K League 1 through the promotion play-offs.

=== Ulsan Hyundai ===
After Busan was relegated to the K League 2 at the end of the 2020 season, another K League 1 club Ulsan Hyundai made Lee an offer. When playing for Ulsan in 2021, he directly exerted his influence, becoming the club's top goalscorer. Ulsan failed to win the league title by finishing second, but he was selected for the K League 1 Best XI.

=== Hertha BSC ===
On 29 January 2022, Lee signed a contract until 2025 with Bundesliga club Hertha BSC. He had difficulty in adapting to duels against Bundesliga players, revealing his physical weakness. He suffered frequent injuries, making only four appearances for a year at Hertha.

=== Jeonbuk Hyundai Motors ===
In December 2022, Lee returned to South Korea to sign for K League 1 club Jeonbuk Hyundai Motors. During the 2023 season, he struggled to recover his physical condition and sense. On 13 December 2023, he scored two goals including his first goal for Jeonbuk in a 3–2 AFC Champions League win over Bangkok United.

Lee enlisted in military football club Gimcheon Sangmu for one and a half years to do his mandatory military service. On 29 October 2025, he came back to Jeonbuk, which clinched the league title 11 days ago. On 6 December, he won his first professional title after scoring the opening goal in a 2–1 Korea Cup final win over Gwangju FC.

== International career ==
In January 2020, Lee scored against Iran and China in the group stage of the 2020 AFC U-23 Championship. After winning the tournament, he participated at the 2020 Summer Olympics.

On 25 March 2021, Lee made his debut for the South Korea national team in a 3–0 friendly defeat to Japan.

== Career statistics ==
As of 7 December 2025

Appearances and goals by club, season and competition
Club	Season	League			Cup		Continental		Other		Total	
Club	Season	Division	Apps	Goals	Apps	Goals	Apps	Goals	Apps	Goals	Apps	Goals
Busan IPark	2017	K League 2	7	0	4	1	—		3 (Note: Appearances in K League 2 promotion play-offs)	2	14	3
Busan IPark	2018	K League 2	23	4	2	0	—		2	0	27	4
Busan IPark	2019	K League 2	36	13	0	0	—		3	0	39	13
Busan IPark	2020	K League 1	26	5	2	0	—		—		28	5
Busan IPark	Total		92	22	8	1	—		8	2	108	25
Ulsan Hyundai	2021	K League 1	32	11	2	1	1 (Note: Appearances in AFC Champions League)	0	2 (Note: Appearances in FIFA Club World Cup)	0	37	12
Hertha BSC	2021–22	Bundesliga	4	0	0	0	—		—		4	0
Jeonbuk Hyundai Motors	2023	K League 1	23	0	2	0	5	2	—		30	2
Jeonbuk Hyundai Motors	2024	K League 1	6	1	0	0	4	0	—		10	1
Jeonbuk Hyundai Motors	2025	K League 1	4	2	1	1	0	0	—		5	3
Jeonbuk Hyundai Motors	Total		33	3	3	1	9	2	—		45	6
Gimcheon Sangmu (draft)	2024	K League 1	8	1	0	0	—		—		8	1
Gimcheon Sangmu (draft)	2025	K League 1	29	5	0	0	—		—		29	5
Gimcheon Sangmu (draft)	Total		37	6	0	0	—		—		37	6
Career total			198	42	13	3	10	2	10	2	231	49

== Honours ==
Jeonbuk Hyundai Motors

- Korea Cup: 2025
- K League Super Cup: 2026

South Korea U23

- AFC U-23 Championship: 2020

Individual

- K League 2 Most Valuable Player: 2019
- K League 2 Best XI: 2019
- K League 1 Best XI: 2021
