= Seo Min-woo (footballer) =

South Korean footballer

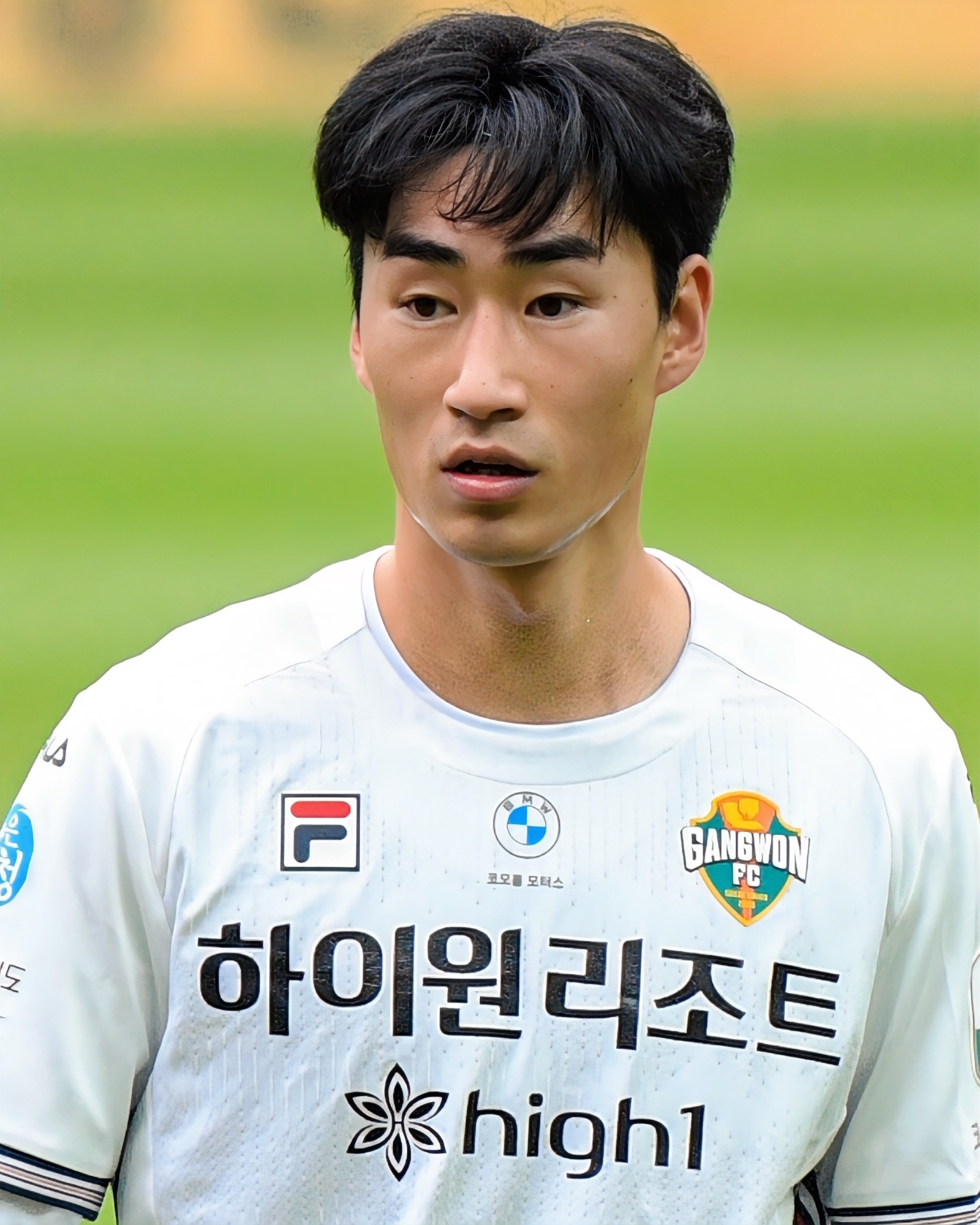
- Seo in 2025

Personal information
- Date of birth: 12 March 1998 (age 28)
- Place of birth: Busan, South Korea
- Height: 6 ft 0 in (1.84 m)
- Position: Defensive midfielder

Team information
- Current team: Gangwon FC
- Number: 4

College career
Years	Team	Apps	(Gls)
2017-2019	Yeungnam University		

Senior career*
Years	Team	Apps	(Gls)
2020–	Gangwon FC	150	(4)
2021	Gangwon FC B	6	(0)
2024–2025	→ Gimcheon Sangmu (draft)	40	(3)

International career^{‡}
2025–	South Korea	4	(0)
- * Club domestic league appearances and goals as of 8 November 2026 ‡ National team caps and goals as of 18 November 2025

Seo Min-woo (Korean: 서민우; born 12 March 1998) is a South Korean professional footballer who plays as a midfielder for K League 1 side Gangwon FC and the South Korea national team.

== Club career ==
Seo had previously played at Seoul E-Land before joining his former coach at Yeungnam University, Kim Byung-soo, at Gangwon of the K League 1. He made his professional debut for the club on 10 May 2020 in their opening match against FC Seoul. He started and played just the first half as Gangwon won 3–1.

== International career ==
On 23 June 2025, He was called up to the South Korea national football team for the first time and participated 2025 EAFF E-1 Football Championship in July 2025.

== Career statistics ==
=== Club ===
As of match played 8 November 2026

Appearances and goals by club, season and competition
Club	Season	League			Cup		Continental		Other		Total	
Club	Season	Division	Apps	Goals	Apps	Goals	Apps	Goals	Apps	Goals	Apps	Goals
Gangwon FC	2020	K League 1	8	0	2	1	—		—		10	1
Gangwon FC	2021	K League 1	23	1	4	0	—		1 (Note: Appearance in K League promotion-relegation play-offs)	0	28	1
Gangwon FC	2022	K League 1	38	0	2	0	—		—		40	0
Gangwon FC	2023	K League 1	32	2	3	0	—		2	0	37	2
Gangwon FC	2025	K League 1	16	1	1	0	5 (Note: Appearances in AFC Champions League Elite)	0	—		22	1
Gangwon FC	2026	K League 1	33	0	0	0	6 (Note: Five appearances in AFC Champions League Elite, one appearance in AFC Champions League Two)	0	—		39	0
Gangwon FC	Total		150	4	12	1	11	0	3	0	176	5
Gangwon FC B	2021	K4 League	6	0	—		—		—		6	0
Gimcheon Sangmu (draft)	2024	K League 1	25	3	1	0	—		—		26	3
Gimcheon Sangmu (draft)	2025	K League 1	15	0	0	0	—		—		15	0
Gimcheon Sangmu (draft)	Total		40	3	1	0	—		—		41	3
Career total			196	7	13	1	11	0	3	0	223	8
