= Lee Ji-ho (footballer) =

South Korean footballer (born 2002)

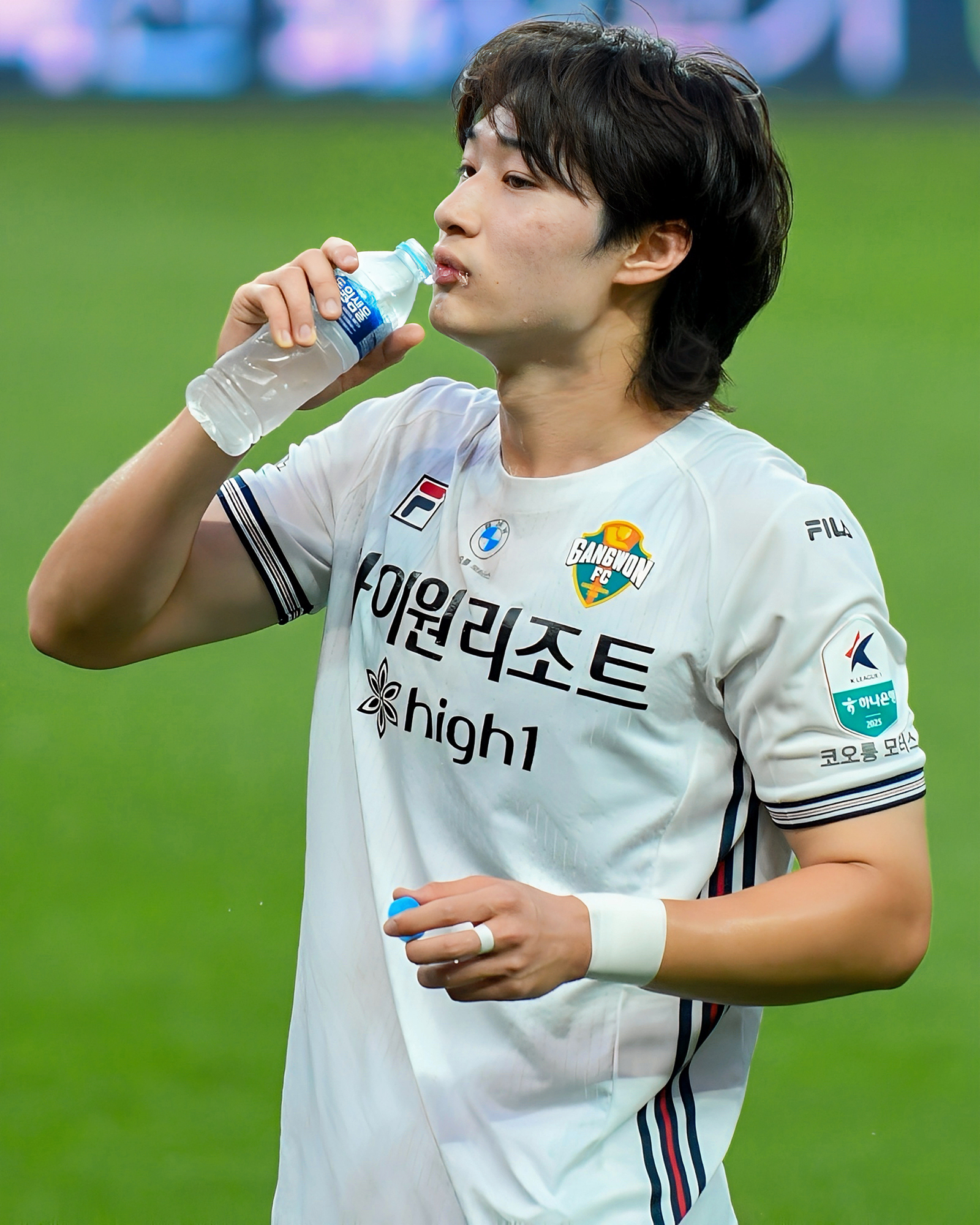
- Lee in 2025

Personal information
- Full name: Lee Ji-ho
- Date of birth: 16 April 2002 (age 24)
- Place of birth: Busan, South Korea
- Height: 1.84 m (6 ft 0 in)
- Positions: Forward; winger

Team information
- Current team: Gangwon FC
- Number: 39

Youth career
- 2015–2020: Ulsan Hyundai

College career
Years	Team	Apps	(Gls)
2021–2024	Korea University	50	(32)

Senior career*
Years	Team	Apps	(Gls)
2025–	Gangwon FC	29	(4)

International career^{‡}
2022	South Korea U23	0	(0)
Korean name
Hangul	이지호
Hanja	李志鎬
RR	I Jiho
MR	I Chiho
- * Club domestic league appearances and goals as of 3 August 2026 ‡ National team caps and goals as of 7 October 2022

Lee Ji-ho (Korean: 이지호; born 16 April 2002) is a South Korean footballer currently playing as a winger for Gangwon FC.

== Club career ==
Lee started his career with Jangsan Elementary School and moved to Ulsan to join Ulsan Hyundai youth teams at Middle school and High school levels. After graduating from high school, he failed to sign a contract with profesional-level teams, including Ulsan Hyundai, and went on to Korea University.

Upon graduating from Korea University, he began his professional career by signing with Gangwon.

== International career ==
He was called up to the South Korea Olympic team in October 2022, in preparation for the 2024 Summer Olympics.

== Career statistics ==
As of 25 May 2025.

Club	Season	League			National Cup		Continental		Total	
Club	Season	Division	Apps	Goals	Apps	Goals	Apps	Goals	Apps	Goals
Gangwon FC	2025	K League 1	14	3	0	0	0	0	14	3
Career total			14	3	0	0	0	0	14	3

Colleage statistccs

Colleage	Season	League			Other		Total	
Colleage	Season	Division	Apps	Goals	Apps	Goals	Apps	Goals
Korea University	2021	U-League	14	8	1 (Note: Appearance in U-League Championships)	0	15	8
Korea University	2022	U-League	9	3	—		9	3
Korea University	2023	U-League	15	12	—		15	12
Korea University	2024	U-League	12	9	—		12	9
Career total			50	32	1	0	51	32
