= Goo Bon-cheul =

South Korean footballer

Personal information
- Date of birth: October 11, 1999 (age 27)
- Place of birth: South Korea
- Height: 1.73 m (5 ft 8 in)
- Position: Midfielder

Team information
- Current team: Suwon FC
- Number: 14

Youth career
- 2015–2017: Incheon Daegun High School
- 2018–2019: Dankook University

Senior career*
Years	Team	Apps	(Gls)
2020–2021	Incheon United	29	(2)
2020	→ Bucheon FC 1995 (loan)	8	(0)
2022–2025	Seongnam FC	38	(6)
2023–2024	→ Gimcheon Sangmu (army)	18	(1)
2025	→ Gangwon FC (loan)	14	(0)
2026–	Suwon FC	17	(0)

International career^{‡}
2018–2019	South Korea U20	7 (Note: excludes three appearances against non-under 20 national team.)	(0)
2021	South Korea U23	3	(0)
Korean name
Hangul	구본철
Hanja	具本哲
RR	Gu Boncheol
MR	Ku Ponch'ŏl
- * Club domestic league appearances and goals as of 5 August 2026 ‡ National team caps and goals as of 31 October 2021

Goo Bon-cheul (Korean: 구본철; born October 11, 1999) is a South Korean professional football midfielder who plays for Suwon FC of the K League 1.

== Career statistics ==
=== Club ===
As of 12 January 2026.

Club	Season	League			Cup		Continental		Total	
Club	Season	Division	Apps	Goals	Apps	Goals	Apps	Goals	Apps	Goals
Bucheon FC 1995 (loan)	2020	K League 2	8	0	1	0	—		9	0
Incheon United	2021	K League 1	29	2	0	0	—		29	2
Seongnam FC	2022	K League 1	27	5	0	0	—		27	5
Seongnam FC	2024	K League 2	11	1	—		—		0	0
Seongnam FC	Total		38	6	0	0	—		38	6
Gimcheon Sangmu (army)	2023	K League 2	15	1	1	0	—		16	1
Gimcheon Sangmu (army)	2024	K League 1	3	0	1	1	—		4	1
Gimcheon Sangmu (army)	Total		18	1	2	1	—		20	2
Gangwon FC (loan)	2025	K League 1	14	0	2	2	3	1	19	3
Suwon FC	2026	K League 2	0	0	0	0	—		0	0
Career total			107	9	5	3	3	1	115	13
