= Kim Gun-hee (footballer) =

South Korean footballer (born 1995)

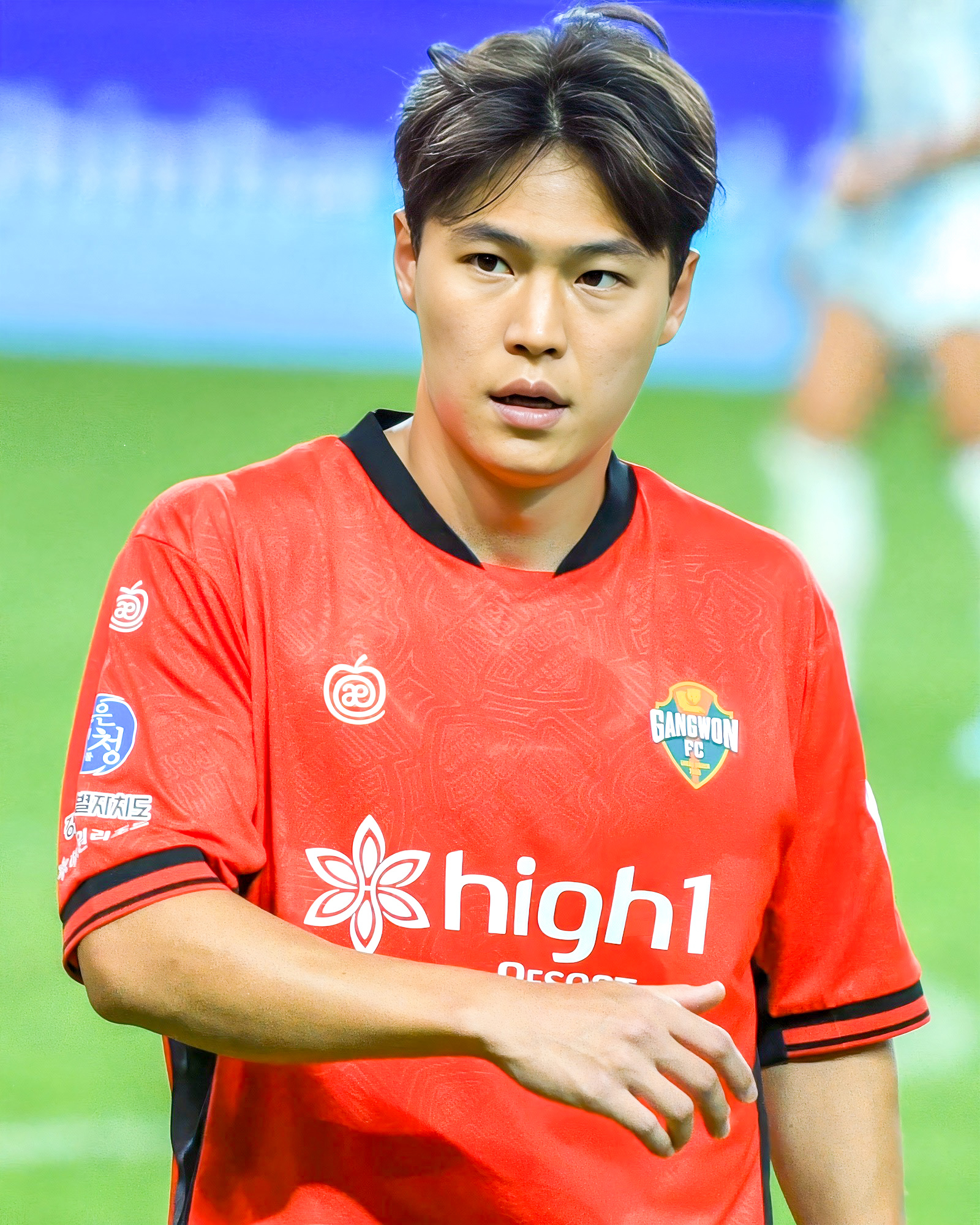
- Kim in 2026

Personal information
- Full name: Kim Gun-hee
- Date of birth: 22 February 1995 (age 31)
- Place of birth: Jeonju, South Korea
- Height: 1.86 m (6 ft 1 in)
- Position: Forward

Team information
- Current team: Gangwon FC
- Number: 16

Youth career
- 2008–2010: Jeonnam Dragons
- 2011–2013: Suwon Samsung Bluewings

College career
Years	Team	Apps	(Gls)
2014–2015	Korea University		

Senior career*
Years	Team	Apps	(Gls)
2016–2022	Suwon Samsung Bluewings	89	(12)
2018–2019	→ Sangju Sangmu (army)	10	(8)
2022–2025	Hokkaido Consadole Sapporo	48	(4)
2025–	Gangwon FC	34	(5)

International career^{‡}
2014	South Korea U-20	6	(3)
2015	South Korea Universiade	6	(0)
2018	South Korea U-23	2	(0)
2021–	South Korea	3	(0)
- * Club domestic league appearances and goals as of 3 August 2026 ‡ National team caps and goals as of 1 February 2022

- Kim Gun-hee
- Hangul: 김건희
- Hanja: 金健熙
- RR: Gim Geonhui
- MR: Kim Kŏnhŭi

Kim Gun-hee (Korean: 김건희; Hanja: 金健熙; born 22 February 1995) is a South Korean football forward who plays for Gangwon FC.

== Club career ==
Kim joined Suwon Samsung Bluewings in 2016 and made his professional debut against Gamba Osaka in AFC Champions League on 24 February 2016. On 3 May 2016, he scored 2 goals against Shanghai SIPG in AFC Champions League. Although they won the game three to zero, Suwon Samsung Bluewings couldn't advance to round of 16. He left the Suwon side to join Hokkaido Consadole Sapporo to play in the J1 League, in his first journey away from South Korea.

On 10 June 2025, Kim move to K League 1 side Gangwon FC.

== Career statistics ==
=== Club ===
As of 3 December 2023.

Club performance			League		Cup		League cup		Continental		Total	
Season	Club	League	Apps	Goals	Apps	Goals	Apps	Goals	Apps	Goals	Apps	Goals
South Korea			League		Cup		League cup		AFC CL		Total	
2016	Suwon Samsung Bluewings	K League 1	20	1	0	0	-		5	2	25	3
2017	Suwon Samsung Bluewings	K League 1	7	0	1	0	-		-		8	0
2018	Suwon Samsung Bluewings	K League 1	9	1	0	0	-		4	2	13	3
2018	Sangju Samgmu (army)	K League 1	0	0	0	0	-		-		0	0
2019	Sangju Samgmu (army)	K League 1	10	8	2	0	-		-		12	8
2020	Suwon Samsung Bluewings	K League 1	17	2	2	0	-		5	1	24	3
2021	Suwon Samsung Bluewings	K League 1	24	6	0	0	-		-		24	6
2022	Suwon Samsung Bluewings	K League 1	12	2	1	0	-		-		13	2
Japan			League		Cup		League cup		AFC CL		Total	
2022	Hokkaido Consadole Sapporo	J1 League	8	2	0	0	0	0	-		8	2
2023	Hokkaido Consadole Sapporo	J1 League	20	2	3	3	3	0	-		26	5
Total	South Korea		99	20	6	0	0	0	14	5	119	25
Total	Japan		28	4	3	3	3	0	0	0	34	7
Career total			127	24	9	3	3	0	14	5	153	32
