= Yongin Football Center =

Football youth academy in Yongin, South Korea

- Interactive map of Yongin Football Center
- Location: Yongin, Gyeonggi, South Korea
- Coordinates: 37°09′02.8″N 127°19′01.1″E
- Owner: Yongin City Hall

Construction
- Groundbreaking: December 2001
- Built: 2001–2004
- Opened: August 2004
- Demolished: 2022

Tenant
- Yongin City FC (2010–2016)

- Yongin Football Center
- Hangul: 용인축구센터
- Hanja: 龍仁蹴球센터
- RR: Yongin chukgu senteo
- MR: Yongin ch'ukku sent'ŏ

The Yongin Football Center (Korean: 용인축구센터) was a sports facility located in Yongin, South Korea. It was the home ground of Yongin City FC from 2010 to 2016.

Yongin Football Center was completed in 2004 and consisted of a football-specific stadium and training facilities. It had five football fields, two of which had natural grass and three had artificial grass.

In 2021, the land was sold to SK Hynix.

As of 2024, the training facility is partially demolished, with teams currently using temporary facilities.
