= 2024 Gangwon FC season =

Gangwon FC
2024 season
- Manager: Yoon Jong-hwan
- K League 1: Runner-up
- Korea Cup: Round of 16 (Fourth Round)
- Top goalscorer: League: Lee Sang-heon (13); All: Lee Sang-heon (13)
- Highest home attendance: 13,170 v Gwangju FC; 18 August 2024, K League 1
- Lowest home attendance: 2,457 v Hwaseong FC; 17 April 2024, Korea Cup
- Average home league attendance: 8,819
- Biggest win: 4–0 v Jeju United; 20 July 2024, K League 1
- Biggest defeat: 0–4 v Ulsan HD; 13 April 2024, K League 1; 0–4 v Suwon FC; 9 November 2024, K League 1
Home colours	Away colours

The 2024 season is the 16th season of Gangwon FC and the club's 13th season in the K League 1. Gangwon FC is competing in K League 1 and Korea Cup (formerly KFA Cup).

== Current squad ==
No.	Player	Nationality	Position(s)	Date of birth (age)
Goalkeepers
1	Lee Gwang-yeon (VC)	South Korea	GK	11 September 1999 (aged 25)
21	Park Cheong-hyo	South Korea	GK	13 February 1990 (aged 34)
31	Cho Min-kyu	South Korea	GK	30 April 2003 (aged 21)
41	Kim Yu-seong	South Korea	GK	16 November 2005 (aged 19)
Defenders
2	Kim Young-bin (VC)	South Korea	CB	20 September 1991 (aged 33)
3	Lee Ji-sol	South Korea	CB	9 July 1999 (aged 25)
5	Jo Hyun-tae	South Korea	CB	27 October 2004 (aged 20)
16	Kim Woo-seok	South Korea	CB	4 August 1996 (aged 28)
17	Yu In-soo	South Korea	LWB / LW	28 December 1994 (aged 30)
20	Yun Suk-young (C)	South Korea	LB / CB	13 February 1990 (aged 34)
30	Shin Min-ha	South Korea	CB	15 September 2005 (aged 19)
32	Park Sang-hyun	South Korea	CB	14 October 2005 (aged 19)
34	Song Jun-seok	South Korea	LB	6 February 2001 (aged 23)
66	Ryu Kwang-hyun	South Korea	LB	18 November 2003 (aged 21)
74	Marko Tući	Montenegro	CB	4 December 1998 (aged 26)
77	Park Tae-rang	South Korea	CB	4 September 2002 (aged 22)
88	Hwang Mun-ki (VC)	South Korea	RB / RWB / CM	8 December 1996 (aged 28)
Midfielders
6	Kim Yi-seok	South Korea	DM	19 June 1998 (aged 26)
13	Lee Ki-hyuk	South Korea	CM / CB	7 July 2000 (aged 24)
14	Kim Dae-woo	South Korea	CM	2 December 2000 (aged 24)
18	Kim Kang-kook	South Korea	CM	7 January 1997 (aged 27)
22	Lee Sang-heon	South Korea	AM / ST	26 February 1998 (aged 26)
24	Henry Hore	Australia	RW	17 August 1999 (aged 25)
27	Hong Sung-moo	South Korea	CM	22 May 2003 (aged 21)
42	Kim Dong-hyun	South Korea	DM	11 June 1997 (aged 27)
97	Lee You-hyeon	South Korea	CM / RB	8 February 1997 (aged 27)
Forwards
9	Franko Kovačević	Croatia	ST / CF	8 August 1999 (aged 25)
10	Vitor Gabriel	Brazil	ST / CF	20 January 2000 (aged 24)
15	Jin Jun-seo	South Korea	CF	1 February 2005 (aged 19)
19	Kim Gyeong-min	South Korea	CF	22 January 1997 (aged 27)
26	Park Kyung-bae	South Korea	CF	15 February 2001 (aged 23)
28	Cho Jin-hyuk	South Korea	LW	10 August 2000 (aged 24)
37	Jung Han-min	South Korea	ST	8 January 2001 (aged 23)
43	Kim Hae-seung	South Korea	LW	6 February 2003 (aged 21)
47	Yang Min-hyeok	South Korea	RW / LW	16 April 2006 (aged 18)
90	Kim Hyeong-jin	South Korea	RW	19 November 2006 (aged 18)
99	Irfan Hadžić	Bosnia and Herzegovina	ST	15 June 1993 (aged 31)
Out on loan
	Kim Dae-won	South Korea	LW / AM	10 February 1997 (aged 27)
	Seo Min-woo	South Korea	CB / DM	12 March 1998 (aged 26)
	Kwon Seok-joo	South Korea	RB	12 June 2003 (aged 21)
	Lee Seung-won	South Korea	CM	6 March 2003 (aged 21)
	Park Sang-hyeok	South Korea	ST	13 June 2002 (aged 22)
	Lee Dong-jin	South Korea	CB	17 December 2000 (aged 24)
	Choe Seong-min	South Korea	ST	25 September 2003 (aged 21)

Last updated: 29 July 2024.
Source: Gangwon FC

== Transfers ==
=== Out ===
Date from	Position	Nationality	Player	To	Notes	Ref.
Pre-season
24 December 2023	MF	(Uzbekistan)	Ikromjon Alibaev	(South Korea) Seongnam FC	End of contract	
31 December 2023	FW	(South Korea)	Yun Il-lok	(South Korea) Ulsan HD	End of loan	
31 December 2023	MF	(South Korea)	Lee Jae-won	(South Korea) Seongnam FC	End of loan	
31 December 2023	DF	(South Korea)	Jung Seung-yong	(South Korea) Seongnam FC	End of contract	
31 December 2023	DF	(South Korea)	Lee Woong-hee	(South Korea) Cheonan City	End of contract	
31 December 2023	FW	(South Korea)	Lee Jeong-hyeop	(South Korea) Seongnam FC	End of contract	
31 December 2023	DF	(South Korea)	Kim Ju-hyeong	Free agent	End of contract	
31 December 2023	MF	(South Korea)	Kim Ki-hwan	(South Korea) Dangjin Citizen	End of contract	
31 December 2023	DF	(South Korea)	Lee Kang-han	(South Korea) Chungbuk Cheongju	End of contract	
31 December 2023	DF	(South Korea)	Jeon Hyeon-byung	(South Korea) Chungbuk Cheongju	End of contract	
31 December 2023	FW	(South Korea)	Woo Byeong-chul	(South Korea) Gyeongju KHNP	End of contract	
31 December 2023	MF	(South Korea)	Ko Min-seok	Free agent	End of contract	
31 December 2023	DF	(South Korea)	Lee Ji-woo	(South Korea) Hwaseong FC	End of contract	
31 December 2023	FW	(South Korea)	Park Gi-hyun	(South Korea) Hwaseong FC	End of contract	
8 January 2024	GK	(South Korea)	Yu Sang-hun	(South Korea) Seongnam FC	Undisclosed	
23 January 2024	MF	(South Korea)	Kim Jin-ho	(South Korea) Gwangju FC	Undisclosed	
23 January 2024	MF	(South Korea)	Kim Hyun-kyu	Free agent	End of contract	
30 January 2024	FW	(South Korea)	Hong Seok-hwan	(South Korea) Pocheon Citizen	End of contract	
Mid-season
20 June 2024	MF	(South Korea)	Han Kook-young	(South Korea) Jeonbuk Hyundai Motors	Undisclosed	
27 June 2024	MF	(South Korea)	Kang Ji-hoon	(South Korea) Busan I'Park	Undisclosed	
1 July 2024	FW	(Brazil)	Yago Cariello	(Portugal) Portimonense	End of loan	
1 July 2024	FW	(Brazil)	Welinton Júnior	Free agent	Mutual consent	
11 July 2024	FW	(Brazil)	Galego	(South Korea) Jeju United	Mutual consent	
19 July 2024	MF	(Japan)	Yuta Kamiya	Free agent	Mutual consent	

- Note: Players will join other clubs after being released or terminated from their contract. Only the following clubs are mentioned when that club signed the player in the same transfer window.

=== Loan out ===
Date from	Position	Nationality	Player	To	Date until	Ref.
Pre-season
18 December 2023	FW	(South Korea)	Kim Dae-won	(South Korea) Gimcheon Sangmu	17 June 2025	
18 December 2023	MF	(South Korea)	Seo Min-woo	(South Korea) Gimcheon Sangmu	17 June 2025	
23 January 2024	DF	(South Korea)	Kwon Seok-joo	(South Korea) Seoul Nowon United	End of season	
Mid-season
29 April 2024	MF	(South Korea)	Lee Seung-won	(South Korea) Gimcheon Sangmu	28 October 2025	
29 April 2024	FW	(South Korea)	Park Sang-hyeok	(South Korea) Gimcheon Sangmu	28 October 2025	
9 July 2024	DF	(South Korea)	Lee Dong-jin	(South Korea) Paju Citizen	End of season	
11 July 2024	FW	(South Korea)	Choe Seong-min	(South Korea) Gangneung City	End of season	

=== In ===
Date from	Position	Nationality	Player	From	Notes	Ref.
Pre-season
24 December 2023	MF	(Japan)	Yuta Kamiya	(Japan) Shimizu S-Pulse	Undisclosed	
29 December 2023	MF	(South Korea)	Yang Min-hyeok	(South Korea) Gangwon FC U-18	Undisclosed	
1 January 2024	MF	(South Korea)	Kim Yi-seok	(South Korea) Gimpo FC	Undisclosed	
1 January 2024	MF	(South Korea)	Lee Sang-heon	(South Korea) Busan IPark	Undisclosed	
8 January 2024	MF	(South Korea)	Kim Kang-kook	(South Korea) Chungnam Asan	Undisclosed	
9 January 2024	GK	(South Korea)	Kim Yu-seong	(South Korea) Chung-Ang University High School	Undisclosed	
9 January 2024	DF	(South Korea)	Park Sang-hyun	(South Korea) Hongcheon FC U-18	Undisclosed	
9 January 2024	DF	(South Korea)	Park Tae-rang	(South Korea) Catholic Kwandong University	Undisclosed	
9 January 2024	DF	(South Korea)	Shin Min-ha	(South Korea) Yongin FC U-18	Undisclosed	
18 January 2024	DF	(South Korea)	Song Jun-seok	(South Korea) Gimpo FC	Loan return	
20 January 2024	MF	(South Korea)	Lee Ki-hyuk	(South Korea) Jeju United	Undisclosed	
23 January 2024	GK	(South Korea)	Park Cheong-hyo	(South Korea) Gimpo FC	Undisclosed	
Mid-season
27 June 2024	FW	(South Korea)	Kim Gyeong-min	(South Korea) FC Seoul	Undisclosed	
4 July 2024	FW	(South Korea)	Kim Hyeong-jin	(South Korea) Shinpyeong High School	Undisclosed	
5 July 2024	FW	(South Korea)	Jin Jun-seo	(South Korea) Incheon National University	Undisclosed	
15 July 2024	MF	(South Korea)	Kim Dong-hyun	(South Korea) Gimcheon Sangmu	Loan return	
17 July 2024	MF	(Bosnia and Herzegovina)	Irfan Hadžić	(Bosnia and Herzegovina) FK Tuzla City	Free transfer	

=== Loan in ===
Date from	Position	Nationality	Player	From	Date until	Ref.
Pre-season
7 February 2024	DF	(South Korea)	Lee You-hyeon	(South Korea) Jeonbuk Hyundai Motors	End of season	
8 March 2024	FW	(South Korea)	Jung Han-min	(South Korea) FC Seoul	End of season	
Mid-season
1 July 2024	FW	(Australia)	Henry Hore	(Australia) Brisbane Roar	End of season	
10 July 2024	FW	(Croatia)	Franko Kovačević	(Germany) SV Wehen Wiesbaden	30 June 2025	

== Competitions ==
=== Overall record ===
Competition	First match	Last match	Starting round	Final position	Record							
Competition	First match	Last match	Starting round	Final position	Pld	W	D	L	GF	GA	GD	Win %
K League 1	1 March 2024	23 November 2024	Matchday 1	Runner-up	38	19	7	12	62	56	+6	50.00
Korea Cup	17 April 2024	19 June 2024	Third round	Fourth round	2	1	1	0	3	1	+2	50.00
Total					40	20	8	12	65	57	+8	50.00

Last updated: 23 November 2024
Source: Competitions

=== K League 1 ===
==== League table ====
Pos	Team	Pld	W	D	L	GF	GA	GD	Pts	Qualification or relegation (Note: Teams played each other three times (33 matches), before the league was split into two groups, the top six and the bottom six.)
1	Ulsan HD (C)	38	21	9	8	62	40	+22	72	Qualification for Champions League Elite league stage
2	Gangwon FC	38	19	7	12	62	56	+6	64	Qualification for Champions League Elite league stage
3	Gimcheon Sangmu (Note: Military-owned team Gimcheon Sangmu cannot qualify for AFC competitions.)	38	18	9	11	55	41	+14	63	
4	FC Seoul	38	16	10	12	55	42	+13	58	Qualification for Champions League Elite league stage
5	Suwon FC	38	15	8	15	54	57	−3	53	

Source: Soccerway K League
Rules for classification: 1) Points; 2) Goals scored; 3) Goal difference; 4) Wins; 5) Head-to-head points
(C) Champions

==== Results summary ====
Overall								Home						Away					
Pld	W	D	L	GF	GA	GD	Pts	W	D	L	GF	GA	GD	W	D	L	GF	GA	GD
38	19	7	12	62	56	+6	64	12	5	2	41	22	+19	7	2	10	21	34	−13

Last updated: 23 November 2024.
Source: Soccerway

==== Results by round ====
Round	1	2	3	4	5	6	7	8	9	10	11	12	13	14	15	16	17	18	19	20	21	22	23	24	25	26	27	28	29	30	31	32	33	34	35	36	37	38
Ground	H	A	A	H	H	A	A	H	A	H	A	H	H	A	H	A	H	H	A	A	H	A	A	H	H	A	H	A	H	A	A	H	A	H	H	A	A	H
Result	D	L	D	D	W	W	L	W	L	L	W	D	W	W	W	W	W	L	L	W	W	L	D	W	W	W	W	L	D	L	L	D	W	W	W	L	L	W
Position	5	8	8	10	8	5	5	4	5	6	4	5	5	4	4	4	2	4	4	4	4	4	4	4	2	1	1	1	1	2	3	3	3	2	2	2	3	2
Points	1	1	2	3	6	9	9	12	12	12	15	16	19	22	25	28	31	31	31	34	37	37	38	41	44	47	50	50	51	51	51	52	55	58	61	61	61	64

Updated to match(es) played on 23 November 2024. Source: K League Data Portal
A = Away; H = Home; W = Win; D = Draw; L = Loss

==== Matches ====
As usual, the league season will be played with 38 matches split in two stages. After 33 league matches between the 12 participating teams, the teams are split into the Final Round (Top 6 teams, which aims to won an AFC Champions spot) and Relegation Round (Bottom 6 teams, that aims to survive relegation). On 8 October 2024, K League announced schedule of the final round.

All times are local, KST (UTC+9).

2 March 2024 1	Gangwon FC	1-1	Jeju United	Chuncheon
16:30	Lee Sang-heon (0:32)		Italo 43'	Stadium: Chuncheon Songam Sports Town; Attendance: 6,021; Referee: Ko Hyung-jin

10 March 2024 2	Gwangju FC	4-2	Gangwon FC	Gwangju
16:30	Gabriel 48', 73'; Lee Kun-hee 61'; Choi Kyoung-rok 90+7' (pen.)		Yang Min-hyeok 1'; Lee Sang-heon 66' (pen.)	Stadium: Gwangju Football Stadium; Attendance: 5,786; Referee: Choi Hyun-jae

16 March 2024 3	Daejeon Hana Citizen	1-1	Gangwon FC	Daejeon
14:00	Mlapa 87'		Yun Suk-young 61'	Stadium: Daejeon World Cup Stadium; Attendance: 17,191; Referee: Sin Yong-jun

31 March 2024 4	Gangwon FC	1-1	FC Seoul	Chuncheon
14:00	Lee Sang-heon 85'; Lee Ji-sol (yellow card) 38' (yellow-red card) 86'		Willyan 71'; Sulaka (red card) 90+5'	Stadium: Chuncheon Songam Sports Town; Attendance: 10,144; Referee: Kim Hee-gon

3 April 2024 5	Gangwon FC	3-0	Daegu FC	Chuncheon
19:30	Yun Suk-young 13'; Lee Sang-heon 64', 90'			Stadium: Chuncheon Songam Sports Town; Attendance: 3,056; Referee: Park Byung-jin

7 April 2024 6	Jeonbuk Hyundai Motors	2-3	Gangwon FC	Jeonju
14:00	Kim Tae-hwan 45+7' (pen.); Moon Seon-min 90+8'		Lee Sang-heon 41' (pen.), 73'; Tući 70'	Stadium: Jeonju World Cup Stadium; Attendance: 11,215; Referee: Choi Hyun-jae

13 April 2024 7	Ulsan HD	4-0	Gangwon FC	Ulsan
16:30	Joo Min-kyu 8', 60'; Lee Dong-gyeong 42'; Um Won-sang 54'			Stadium: Ulsan Munsu Football Stadium; Attendance: 13,874; Referee: Kim Dae-yong

21 April 2024 8	Gangwon FC	4-1	Incheon United	Chuncheon
14:00	Yago 19', 45+1', 53'; Kim Yi-seok 45+3'		Mugoša 79'	Stadium: Chuncheon Songam Sports Town; Attendance: 6,025; Referee: Park Byung-jin

27 April 2024 9	Gimcheon Sangmu	1-0	Gangwon FC	Gimcheon
16:30	Lee Joong-min 89'			Stadium: Gimcheon Stadium; Attendance: 2,338; Referee: Seol Tae-hwan

1 May 2024 10	Gangwon FC	2-4	Pohang Steelers	Chuncheon
19:00	Yang Min-hyeok 75'; Jung Han-min 83'		Jeong Jae-hee 33', 52', 62'; Lee Ho-jae 90'	Stadium: Chuncheon Songam Sports Town; Attendance: 4,157; Referee: Jeong Dong-sik

5 May 2024 11	Suwon FC	1-2	Gangwon FC	Suwon
14:00	Lee Seung-woo 75'		Cho Jin-hyuk 81'; Jung Han-min 90'	Stadium: Suwon Stadium; Attendance: 3,008; Referee: Lee Dong-jun

11 May 2024 12	Gangwon FC	3-3	Daejeon Hana Citizen	Chuncheon
19:00	Yang Min-hyeok 40'; Lee Sang-heon 62'; Yago Cariello 71'		Jung Kang-min 1'; Lee Joon-kyu 21'; Mlapa 90+12' (pen.)	Stadium: Chuncheon Songam Sports Town; Attendance: 4,263; Referee: Choi Hyun-jae

19 May 2024 13	Gangwon FC	1-0	Ulsan HD	Chuncheon
16:30	Yago Cariello 66'			Stadium: Chuncheon Songam Sports Town; Attendance: 7,850; Referee: Chae Sang-hyeob

26 May 2024 14	Daegu FC	1-2	Gangwon FC	Daegu
16:30	Jang Seong-won 75'		Kim Yi-seok 52'; Hwang Mun-ki 90+1'	Stadium: DGB Daegu Bank Park; Attendance: 11,977; Referee: Ko Hyung-jin

29 May 2024 15	Gangwon FC	2-1	Jeonbuk Hyundai Motors	Chuncheon
19:30	Yang Min-hyeok 3'; Yago Cariello 77'		Lee Yeong-jae 23'; Jeon Byung-kwan (yellow card) 53' (yellow-red card)	Stadium: Chuncheon Songam Sports Town; Attendance: 6,125; Referee: Lee Dong-jun

2 June 2024 16	Jeju United	1-2	Gangwon FC	Seogwipo
16:30	An Tae-hyun 73'; Hong Joon-ho (red card) 83'		Song Jun-seok 4'; Yago Cariello 42'	Stadium: Jeju World Cup Stadium; Attendance: 6,534; Referee: Jeong Dong-sik

15 June 2024 17	Gangwon FC	3-1	Suwon FC	Chuncheon
20:00	Yu In-soo 12'; Yago Cariello 55'; Yang Min-hyeok 65'		Lee Seung-woo 54'	Stadium: Chuncheon Songam Sports Town; Attendance: 9,704; Referee: Sin Yong-jun

22 June 2024 18	Gangwon FC	2-3	Gimcheon Sangmu	Gangneung
19:00	Kim Dae-woo 1'; Cho Jin-hyuk 35'		Seo Min-woo 23'; Mo Jae-hyeon 39'; Yu Kang-hyun 45+3'	Stadium: Gangneung Stadium; Attendance: 11,578; Referee: Park Byung-jin

26 June 2024 19	FC Seoul	2-0	Gangwon FC	Seoul
19:30	Lingard 55' (pen.); Ryu Jae-moon 73'			Stadium: Seoul World Cup Stadium; Attendance: 13,303; Referee: Kim Yong-woo

30 June 2024 20	Incheon United	0-1	Gangwon FC	Incheon
19:00			Yago Cariello 70'	Stadium: Incheon Football Stadium; Attendance: 6,164; Referee: Chae Sang-hyeob

7 July 2024 21	Gangwon FC	2-0	Gwangju FC	Gangneung
19:00	Jung Han-min 33'; Kim Jin-ho 81' (o.g.)			Stadium: Gangneung Stadium; Attendance: 10,334; Referee: Kim Woo-sung

10 July 2024 22	Pohang Steelers	2-0	Gangwon FC	Pohang
19:30	Oberdan 50'; Yun Min-ho 76'			Stadium: Pohang Steel Yard; Attendance: 5,287; Referee: Park Byung-jin

13 July 2024 23	Daejeon Hana Citizen	1-1	Gangwon FC	Daejeon
19:30	Park Jeong-in 27'		Yu In-soo 77'	Stadium: Daejeon World Cup Stadium; Attendance: 7,147; Referee: Kim Dae-yong

20 July 2024 24	Gangwon FC	4-0	Jeju United	Gangneung
19:30	Chung Woon 13' (o.g.); Yang Min-hyeok 23', 65'; Kovačević 27'			Stadium: Gangneung Stadium; Attendance: 10,710; Referee: Sin Yong-jun

26 July 2024 25	Gangwon FC	4-2	Jeonbuk Hyundai Motors	Gangneung
19:30	Yang Min-hyeok 32'; Kim Gyeong-min 54', 63'; Jin Jun-seo 85'		Song Min-kyu 61'; Kim Jin-gyu 70'	Stadium: Gangneung Stadium; Attendance: 12,272; Referee: Ko Hyung-jin

9 August 2024 26	Gimcheon Sangmu	1-2	Gangwon FC	Gimcheon
19:30	Kim Young-bin 35' (o.g.)		Lee Sang-heon 45+1', 64'	Stadium: Gimcheon Stadium; Attendance: 3,402; Referee: Kim Dae-yong

18 August 2024 27	Gangwon FC	3-2	Gwangju FC	Gangneung
19:00	Kovačević 45+3', 50'; Hore 74'		Asani 14'; Tući 21' (o.g.)	Stadium: Gangneung Stadium; Attendance: 13,170; Referee: Kim Jong-hyeok

24 August 2024 28	FC Seoul	2-0	Gangwon FC	Seoul
19:30	Lee Seung-mo 31'; Lingard 40'			Stadium: Seoul World Cup Stadium; Attendance: 34,086; Referee: Kim Woo-sung

1 September 2024 29	Gangwon FC	2-2	Suwon FC	Gangneung
	Son Jun-ho 3' (o.g.); Kovačević 47'		Anderson Oliveira 21'; Choi Kyu-baek 90+4'	Stadium: Gangneung Stadium; Attendance: 12,292; Referee: Sin Yong-jun

13 September 2024 30	Ulsan HD	2-0	Gangwon FC	Ulsan
19:30	Kang Yun-gu 14'; Ataru Esaka 79'			Stadium: Ulsan Munsu Football Stadium; Attendance: 22,010; Referee: Park Byung-jin

22 September 2024 31	Pohang Steelers	2-1	Gangwon FC	Pohang
16:30	Tući 5' (o.g.); Jorge Luiz 90+5'		Yang Min-hyeok 90+3'	Stadium: Pohang Steel Yard; Attendance: 9,427; Referee: Song Min-seok

28 September 2024 32	Gangwon FC	1-1	Daegu FC	Gangneung
16:30	Hwang Mun-ki 69'		Cesinha 74'	Stadium: Gangneung Stadium; Attendance: 12,677; Referee: Ko Hyung-jin

6 October 2024 33	Incheon United	1-3	Gangwon FC	Incheon
15:00	Jonjić (red card) 52'; Hong Si-hoo 72'		Yang Min-hyeok 33'; Lee Sang-heon 85', 90+1'	Stadium: Incheon Football Stadium; Attendance: 14,434; Referee: Kim Yong-woo

20 October 2024 34	Gangwon FC	1-0	FC Seoul	Gangneung
14:00	Kim Young-bin 46'			Stadium: Gangneung Stadium; Attendance: 12,742; Referee: Sin Yong-jun

26 October 2024 35	Gangwon FC	1-0	Gimcheon Sangmu	Gangneung
14:00	Yang Min-hyeok 63'			Stadium: Gangneung Stadium; Attendance: 9,383; Referee: Jeong Dong-sik

1 November 2024 36	Ulsan HD	2-1	Gangwon FC	Ulsan
19:30	Ludwigson 35'; Joo Min-kyu 53'		Lee Sang-heon 59'	Stadium: Ulsan Stadium; Attendance: 13,438; Referee: Ko Hyung-jin

9 November 2024 37	Suwon FC	4-0	Gangwon FC	Suwon
16:30	Jeong Seung-won 5'; Kim Tae-han 41'; Jung Seung-bae 67'; Anderson Oliveira 75'			Stadium: Suwon Stadium; Attendance: 6,778; Referee: Park Byung-jin

23 November 2024 38	Gangwon FC	1-0	Pohang Steelers	Gangneung
14:00	Yang Min-hyeok 35'			Stadium: Gangneung Stadium; Attendance: 11,426; Referee: Kim Woo-sung

=== Korea Cup ===
17 April 2024 Third Round	Gangwon FC	3-1 (a.e.t.)	Hwaseong FC	Gangneung
19:00	Kamiya 73'; Song Jun-seok 91'; Galego 120+3'		Kim Nam-seong 88'	Stadium: Gangneung Stadium

19 June 2024 Round of 16	FC Seoul	0-0 (a.e.t.) (5–4 p)	Gangwon FC	Seoul
19:30				Stadium: Seoul World Cup Stadium
	Penalties
	Paločević (penalty scored); Lim Sang-hyub (penalty scored); Park Dong-jin (penalty scored); Han Seung-gyu (penalty scored); Willyan (penalty scored)		(penalty scored) Kamiya; (penalty scored) Song Jun-seok; (penalty scored) Shin Min-ha; (penalty scored) Lee You-hyeon; (penalty missed) Ryu Kwang-hyun

== Statistics ==
=== Appearances and goals ===
Last updated on 23 November 2024.

No.	Pos	Nat	Player	Total		K League 1		Korea Cup	
No.	Pos	Nat	Player	Apps	Goals	Apps	Goals	Apps	Goals
Goalkeepers
1	GK	(South Korea) KOR	Lee Gwang-yeon	29	0	28	0	1	0
21	GK	(South Korea) KOR	Park Cheong-hyo	10	0	9	0	1	0
31	GK	(South Korea) KOR	Cho Min-kyu	0	0	0	0	0	0
41	GK	(South Korea) KOR	Kim Yu-seong	1	0	1	0	0	0
Defenders
2	DF	(South Korea) KOR	Kim Young-bin	26	1	23+2	1	0+1	0
3	DF	(South Korea) KOR	Lee Ji-sol	8	0	3+3	0	2	0
5	DF	(South Korea) KOR	Jo Hyun-tae	4	0	0+3	0	0+1	0
16	DF	(South Korea) KOR	Kim Woo-seok	5	0	1+3	0	0+1	0
17	DF	(South Korea) KOR	Yu In-soo	30	2	22+6	2	1+1	0
20	DF	(South Korea) KOR	Yun Suk-young	17	2	16+1	2	0	0
30	DF	(South Korea) KOR	Shin Min-ha	22	0	1+19	0	2	0
32	DF	(South Korea) KOR	Park Sang-hyun	0	0	0	0	0	0
34	DF	(South Korea) KOR	Song Jun-seok	24	2	15+7	1	1+1	1
66	DF	(South Korea) KOR	Ryu Kwang-hyun	2	0	0	0	1+1	0
74	DF	(Montenegro) MNE	Marko Tući	32	1	30+2	1	0	0
77	DF	(South Korea) KOR	Park Tae-rang	0	0	0	0	0	0
88	DF	(South Korea) KOR	Hwang Mun-ki	36	1	35+1	1	0	0
Midfielders
6	MF	(South Korea) KOR	Kim Yi-seok	18	2	15+3	2	0	0
13	MF	(South Korea) KOR	Lee Ki-hyuk	35	0	32+3	0	0	0
14	MF	(South Korea) KOR	Kim Dae-woo	15	1	7+7	1	1	0
18	MF	(South Korea) KOR	Kim Kang-kook	32	0	24+8	0	0	0
22	MF	(South Korea) KOR	Lee Sang-heon	37	13	33+4	13	0	0
24	MF	(Australia) AUS	Henry Hore	10	1	1+9	1	0	0
27	MF	(South Korea) KOR	Hong Sung-moo	0	0	0	0	0	0
42	MF	(South Korea) KOR	Kim Dong-hyun	12	0	11+1	0	0	0
97	MF	(South Korea) KOR	Lee You-hyeon	26	0	19+6	0	1	0
Forwards
9	FW	(Croatia) CRO	Franko Kovačević	15	4	13+2	4	0	0
10	FW	(Brazil) BRA	Vitor Gabriel	14	0	3+10	0	0+1	0
15	FW	(South Korea) KOR	Jin Jun-seo	6	1	0+6	1	0	0
19	FW	(South Korea) KOR	Kim Gyeong-min	11	2	2+9	2	0	0
26	FW	(South Korea) KOR	Park Kyung-bae	2	0	0+1	0	0+1	0
28	FW	(South Korea) KOR	Cho Jin-hyuk	28	2	8+19	2	1	0
37	FW	(South Korea) KOR	Jung Han-min	16	3	6+8	3	2	0
43	FW	(South Korea) KOR	Kim Hae-seung	1	0	0	0	1	0
47	FW	(South Korea) KOR	Yang Min-hyeok	38	12	37+1	12	0	0
90	FW	(South Korea) KOR	Kim Hyeong-jin	2	0	0+2	0	0	0
99	FW	(Bosnia and Herzegovina) BIH	Irfan Hadžić	3	0	0+3	0	0	0
Player(s) who left on loan but featured this season
19	FW	(South Korea) KOR	Park Sang-hyeok	0	0	0	0	0	0
25	DF	(South Korea) KOR	Lee Dong-jin	1	0	0	0	0+1	0
33	MF	(South Korea) KOR	Lee Seung-won	0	0	0	0	0	0
39	FW	(South Korea) KOR	Choe Seong-min	3	0	0+1	0	1+1	0
Player(s) who left permanently but featured this season
7	MF	(Japan) JPN	Yuta Kamiya	12	1	0+10	0	2	1
8	MF	(South Korea) KOR	Han Kook-young	6	0	2+4	0	0	0
11	FW	(Brazil) BRA	Galego	6	1	1+3	0	1+1	1
23	MF	(South Korea) KOR	Kang Ji-hoon	3	0	0+1	0	2	0
93	FW	(Brazil) BRA	Welinton Júnior	4	0	3	0	1	0
99	FW	(Brazil) BRA	Yago Cariello	18	9	17+1	9	0	0

=== Goalscorers ===
Italic marked players have left during the season.

Rank	Pos.	No.	Player	K League 1	Korea Cup	Total
1	MF	22	(South Korea) Lee Sang-heon	13	0	13
2	FW	47	(South Korea) Yang Min-hyeok	12	0	12
3	FW	99	(Brazil) Yago Cariello	9	0	9
4	FW	9	(Croatia) Franko Kovačević	4	0	4
5	FW	37	(South Korea) Jung Han-min	3	0	3
6	MF	6	(South Korea) Kim Yi-seok	2	0	2
6	DF	17	(South Korea) Yu In-soo	2	0	2
6	FW	19	(South Korea) Kim Gyeong-min	2	0	2
6	DF	20	(South Korea) Yun Suk-young	2	0	2
6	FW	28	(South Korea) Cho Jin-hyuk	2	0	2
6	DF	88	(South Korea) Hwang Mun-ki	2	0	2
6	DF	34	(South Korea) Song Jun-seok	1	1	2
13	DF	2	(South Korea) Kim Young-bin	1	0	1
13	MF	14	(South Korea) Kim Dae-woo	1	0	1
13	FW	15	(South Korea) Jin Jun-seo	1	0	1
13	FW	24	(Australia) Henry Hore	1	0	1
13	DF	74	(Montenegro) Marko Tući	1	0	1
13	MF	7	(Japan) Yuta Kamiya	0	1	1
13	FW	11	(Brazil) Galego	0	1	1
-	Own goals			3	0	3
Totals				62	3	65

=== Top assists ===
Italic marked players have left during the season.

Rank	Pos.	No.	Player	K League 1	Korea Cup	Total
1	DF	88	(South Korea) Hwang Mun-ki	7	0	7
2	MF	22	(South Korea) Lee Sang-heon	6	0	6
2	FW	47	(South Korea) Yang Min-hyeok	6	0	6
4	MF	13	(South Korea) Lee Ki-hyuk	4	0	4
4	DF	17	(South Korea) Yu In-soo	4	0	4
6	MF	6	(South Korea) Kim Yi-seok	2	0	2
6	MF	14	(South Korea) Kim Dae-woo	2	0	2
6	DF	20	(South Korea) Yun Suk-young	2	0	2
6	DF	74	(Montenegro) Marko Tući	2	0	2
6	FW	39	(South Korea) Choe Seong-min	0	2	2
11	DF	16	(South Korea) Kim Woo-seok	1	0	1
11	MF	18	(South Korea) Kim Kang-kook	1	0	1
11	FW	28	(South Korea) Cho Jin-hyuk	1	0	1
11	FW	37	(South Korea) Jung Han-min	1	0	1
11	MF	97	(South Korea) Lee You-hyeon	1	0	1
11	FW	99	(Brazil) Yago Cariello	1	0	1
11	FW	10	(Brazil) Vitor Gabriel	0	1	1
Totals				41	3	44

=== Clean sheets ===
Rank	No.	Player	K League 1	Korea Cup	Total
1	1	(South Korea) Lee Gwang-yeon	6	0	6
2	21	(South Korea) Park Cheong-hyo	1	1	2
3	41	(South Korea) Kim Yu-seong	1	0	1
Totals			8	1	9

=== Discipline ===
Rank	Pos.	No.	Player	K League 1			Korea Cup			Total		
Rank	Pos.	No.	Player	Yellow card	(yellow card) (yellow-red card)	Red card	Yellow card	(yellow card) (yellow-red card)	Red card	Yellow card	(yellow card) (yellow-red card)	Red card
1	DF	34	(South Korea) Song Jun-seok	8	0	0	2	0	0	10	0	0
2	MF	13	(South Korea) Lee Ki-hyuk	6	0	0	0	0	0	6	0	0
3	DF	2	(South Korea) Kim Young-bin	5	0	0	0	0	0	5	0	0
4	MF	6	(South Korea) Kim Yi-seok	4	0	0	0	0	0	4	0	0
4	DF	17	(South Korea) Yu In-soo	4	0	0	0	0	0	4	0	0
4	DF	74	(Montenegro) Marko Tući	4	0	0	0	0	0	4	0	0
4	MF	97	(South Korea) Lee You-hyeon	4	0	0	0	0	0	4	0	0
4	DF	13	(South Korea) Lee Ji-sol	0	1	0	1	0	0	1	1	0
9	GK	1	(South Korea) Lee Gwang-yeon	3	0	0	0	0	0	3	0	0
9	DF	88	(South Korea) Hwang Mun-ki	3	0	0	0	0	0	3	0	0
11	MF	14	(South Korea) Kim Dae-woo	2	0	0	0	0	0	2	0	0
11	FW	15	(South Korea) Jin Jun-seo	2	0	0	0	0	0	2	0	0
11	DF	20	(South Korea) Yun Suk-young	2	0	0	0	0	0	2	0	0
11	FW	28	(South Korea) Cho Jin-hyuk	2	0	0	0	0	0	2	0	0
11	MF	42	(South Korea) Kim Dong-hyun	2	0	0	0	0	0	2	0	0
11	FW	47	(South Korea) Yang Min-hyeok	2	0	0	0	0	0	2	0	0
11	FW	99	(Brazil) Yago Cariello	2	0	0	0	0	0	2	0	0
11	FW	11	(Brazil) Galego	1	0	0	1	0	0	2	0	0
18	MF	7	(Japan) Yuta Kamiya	1	0	0	0	0	0	1	0	0
18	MF	18	(South Korea) Kim Kang-kook	1	0	0	0	0	0	1	0	0
18	FW	19	(South Korea) Kim Gyeong-min	1	0	0	0	0	0	1	0	0
18	GK	21	(South Korea) Park Cheong-hyo	1	0	0	0	0	0	1	0	0
18	MF	22	(South Korea) Lee Sang-heon	1	0	0	0	0	0	1	0	0
18	MF	24	(Australia) Henry Hore	1	0	0	0	0	0	1	0	0
18	DF	30	(South Korea) Shin Min-ha	1	0	0	0	0	0	1	0	0
18	GK	41	(South Korea) Kim Yu-seong	1	0	0	0	0	0	1	0	0
18	FW	99	(Bosnia and Herzegovina) Irfan Hadžić	1	0	0	0	0	0	1	0	0
18	MF	23	(South Korea) Kang Ji-hoon	0	0	0	1	0	0	1	0	0
Totals				67	1	0	5	0	0	72	1	0

== Awards ==
=== Annual awards ===
Note : Only included Gangwon FC manager or players are listed.

Most Valuable Player		Young Player of the Year		Manager of the Year	
Player	Result	Player	Result	Manager	Result
(South Korea) Yang Min-hyeok (MF)	Nominated	(South Korea) Yang Min-hyeok (MF)	Won	(South Korea) Yoon Jung-hwan	Won

Best Eleven of the Year
Forwards		Midfielders		Defenders		Goalkeeper	
Player	Result	Player	Result	Player	Result	Player	Result
(South Korea) Lee Sang-heon	Won	(South Korea) Yang Min-hyeok	Won	(South Korea) Hwang Mun-ki	Won		
				(South Korea) Kim Young-bin	Nominated		
				(South Korea) Lee Ki-hyuk	Nominated		
				(Montenegro) Marko Tući	Nominated		

=== Monthly awards ===
Note : Player of the Month, Goal of the Month and Save of the Month have official nominees. Only month included Gangwon FC manager or players are listed.

Month	Player of the Month		Young Player of the Month		Goal of the Month		Save of the Month		Manager of the Month	
Month	Player	Result	Player	Result	Player	Result	Player	Result	Manager	Result
April	(South Korea) Lee Sang-heon (FW)	Nominated	(South Korea) Yang Min-hyeok (MF)	Won						
May	(Brazil) Yago Cariello (FW)	Nominated	(South Korea) Yang Min-hyeok (MF)	Won	(South Korea) Yang Min-hyeok (MF)	Nominated			(South Korea) Yoon Jung-hwan	Won
June	(South Korea) Lee Sang-heon (FW)	Nominated	(South Korea) Yang Min-hyeok (MF)	Won						
July	(South Korea) Yang Min-hyeok (MF)	Won	(South Korea) Yang Min-hyeok (MF)	Won	(South Korea) Yang Min-hyeok (MF)	Won			(South Korea) Yoon Jung-hwan	Won
August	(South Korea) Lee Sang-heon (FW)	Nominated								
October	(South Korea) Lee Ki-hyuk (DF)	Nominated	(South Korea) Yang Min-hyeok (MF)	Won					(South Korea) Yoon Jung-hwan	Won

=== Round awards ===
Note : Bold players are determined the MVP of the round. Only rounds included Gangwon FC players are listed.
