= 2019 FIFA U-20 World Cup =

Mistrzostwa Świata U-20 w Piłce Nożnej 2019

Tournament details
- Host country: Poland
- Dates: 23 May – 15 June
- Teams: 24 (from 6 confederations)
- Venues: 6 (in 6 host cities)

Final positions
- Champions: Ukraine (1st title)
- Runners-up: South Korea
- Third place: Ecuador
- Fourth place: Italy

Tournament statistics
- Matches played: 52
- Goals scored: 153 (2.94 per match)
- Attendance: 377,338 (7,257 per match)
- Top scorer(s): (Norway) Erling Haaland (9 goals)
- Best player: (South Korea) Lee Kang-in
- Best goalkeeper: (Ukraine) Andriy Lunin
- Fair play award: Japan

The 2019 FIFA U-20 World Cup was the 22nd edition of the FIFA U-20 World Cup, the biennial international men's youth football championship contested by the under-20 national teams of the member associations of FIFA, since its inception in 1977 as the FIFA World Youth Championship. The tournament was hosted by Poland between 23 May and 15 June 2019. This was the first FIFA tournament hosted by Poland; the country had hosted UEFA international football events in the past including the UEFA Euro 2012 with Ukraine and the 2017 UEFA European Under-21 Championship.

England won the previous tournament in South Korea, but did not qualify for the tournament after finishing sixth at the 2018 UEFA European Under-19 Championship in Finland. In doing so, they became the sixth consecutive incumbent title holders to fail to qualify for the subsequent tournament. The official match ball used in the tournament was Adidas Conext19.

Ukraine won their first FIFA U-20 World Cup title after beating South Korea 3–1 in the final. They did it in their first appearance further than the round of 16, becoming the first team from a former Soviet republic other than Russia to win a FIFA competition title since its dissolution in 1991. The Soviet Union, whose record is now inherited by Russia, previously won the inaugural U-20 World Cup in 1977.

In the group stage, Norway's 12–0 win against Honduras was the biggest winning margin in any FIFA men's football tournament finals, while Erling Haaland's nine goals in the same match made him the only player to score a triple hat-trick at any significant intercontinental tournament for national teams for any gender.

== Host selection ==
The bidding process to host the 2019 FIFA U-20 World Cup and the 2019 FIFA U-17 World Cup was launched by FIFA in June 2017. A member association may bid for both tournaments, but they would be awarded to different hosts.

=== Candidate countries ===
Two countries submitted formal bids to host the tournament.

- India
- Poland

FIFA announced Poland as the hosts after the FIFA Council meeting on 16 March 2018 in Bogotá, Colombia. Poland won the bid over India in a 9–5 vote.

== Qualified teams ==
A total of 24 teams qualified for the final tournament. In addition to Poland, who qualified automatically as hosts, 23 other teams qualified from six separate continental competitions. The slot allocation was approved by the FIFA Council on 10 June 2018. All 24 teams qualified had played in the tournament prior to this edition, making this the first and only (as of 2027) U-20 World Cup in which none of the teams that earned a spot were making their debut.

Confederation	Qualifying tournament	Team	Appearance	Last appearance	Previous best performance
AFC (Asia)	2018 AFC U-19 Championship	Qatar	4th	2015	Runners-up (1981)
AFC (Asia)	2018 AFC U-19 Championship	Japan	10th	2017	Runners-up (1999)
AFC (Asia)	2018 AFC U-19 Championship	South Korea	15th	2017	Fourth place (1983)
AFC (Asia)	2018 AFC U-19 Championship	Saudi Arabia	9th	2017	Round of 16 (2011, 2017)
CAF (Africa)	2019 Africa U-20 Cup of Nations	Senegal	3rd	2017	Fourth place (2015)
CAF (Africa)	2019 Africa U-20 Cup of Nations	Nigeria	12th	2015	Runners-up (1989, 2005)
CAF (Africa)	2019 Africa U-20 Cup of Nations	South Africa	4th	2017	Round of 16 (2009)
CAF (Africa)	2019 Africa U-20 Cup of Nations	Mali	7th	2015	Third place (1999, 2015)
CONCACAF (Central, North America and Caribbean)	2018 CONCACAF U-20 Championship	Mexico	16th	2017	Runners-up (1977)
CONCACAF (Central, North America and Caribbean)	2018 CONCACAF U-20 Championship	Panama	6th	2015	Group stage (2003, 2005, 2007, 2011, 2015)
CONCACAF (Central, North America and Caribbean)	2018 CONCACAF U-20 Championship	United States	16th	2017	Fourth place (1989)
CONCACAF (Central, North America and Caribbean)	2018 CONCACAF U-20 Championship	Honduras	8th	2017	Group stage (1977, 1995, 1999, 2005, 2009, 2015, 2017)
CONMEBOL (South America)	2019 South American U-20 Championship	Argentina	16th	2017	Champions (1979, 1995, 1997, 2001, 2005, 2007)
CONMEBOL (South America)	2019 South American U-20 Championship	Uruguay	15th	2017	Runners-up (1997, 2013)
CONMEBOL (South America)	2019 South American U-20 Championship	Ecuador	4th	2017	Round of 16 (2001, 2011)
CONMEBOL (South America)	2019 South American U-20 Championship	Colombia	10th	2015	Third place (2003)
OFC (Oceania)	2018 OFC U-19 Championship	New Zealand	6th	2017	Round of 16 (2015, 2017)
OFC (Oceania)	2018 OFC U-19 Championship	Tahiti	2nd	2009	Group stage (2009)
UEFA (Europe)	Host nation	Poland	5th	2007	Third place (1983)
UEFA (Europe)	2018 UEFA European Under-19 Championship	Italy	7th	2017	Third place (2017)
UEFA (Europe)	2018 UEFA European Under-19 Championship	Portugal	12th	2017	Champions (1989, 1991)
UEFA (Europe)	2018 UEFA European Under-19 Championship	Ukraine	4th	2015	Round of 16 (2001, 2005, 2015)
UEFA (Europe)	2018 UEFA European Under-19 Championship	France	7th	2017	Champions (2013)
UEFA (Europe)	2018 UEFA European Under-19 Championship	Norway	3rd	1993	Group stage (1989, 1993)

== Venues ==
Bielsko-Biała, Bydgoszcz, Gdynia, Łódź, Lublin and Tychy were the six cities hosting the competition. Lubin (not to confuse with Lublin) ended up withdrawn from the list due to hotel capacity troubles and was replaced by Bielsko-Biała.

Bielsko-Biała	Bydgoszcz	Gdynia
Stadion Miejski (Bielsko-Biała Stadium)	Stadion im. Zdzisława Krzyszkowiaka (Bydgoszcz Stadium)	Stadion Miejski (Gdynia Stadium)
Capacity: 15,076	Capacity: 20,247	Capacity: 15,139
2019 FIFA U-20 World Cup is located in Poland
Łódź	Lublin	Tychy
Stadion Widzewa (Łódź Stadium)	Arena Lublin (Lublin Stadium)	Stadion Miejski (Tychy Stadium)
Capacity: 18,008	Capacity: 15,500	Capacity: 15,600

== Organization ==
The emblem was unveiled on 14 December 2018. The emblem features a crocus, a flower that blooms every spring in Poland combined with the colors of the Polish flag, symbolising the new faces that will emerge to shape the tournament's trophy.

Grzywek, the official mascot was unveiled on 23 February 2019 one day before the final draw. Grzywek is inspired by a Polish bison distinctive name comes from the Polish word for "mane" – the long and coarse hair that adorns the neck of this striking animal – and also symbolises the country's pride at hosting its first ever FIFA competition.

== Draw and schedule ==
The match schedule was unveiled on 14 December 2018, the same day as the official emblem.

The final draw was held on 24 February 2019, 17:30 CET (UTC+1), at the Gdynia Sports Arena in Gdynia. The 24 teams were drawn into six groups of four teams. The hosts Poland were automatically seeded into Pot 1 and assigned to position A1, while the remaining teams were seeded into their respective pots based on their results in the last five FIFA U-20 World Cups (more recent tournaments weighted more heavily), and with five bonus points added to each of the 6 continental champions from the qualifying tournaments, as follows:

Pot	Team	Confederation	2009	2011	2013	2015	2017		
Pot	Team	Confederation	Points (20%)	Points (40%)	Points (60%)	Points (80%)	Points (100%)	Bonus (Note: Continental champions bonus points)	Total points
1	Poland (H)	UEFA	Host nation, automatically assigned to Pot 1						
1	Portugal	UEFA	DNQ	5.6	4.2	10.4	8	+5	33.2
1	Uruguay	CONMEBOL	1.4	0.8	8.4	4	13		27.6
1	France	UEFA	DNQ	4.8	8.4	DNQ	9		22.2
1	United States	CONCACAF	0.6	DNQ	0.6	8	8	+5	22.2
1	Mexico	CONCACAF	DNQ	4.4	1.8	2.4	7		15.6
2	Mali	CAF	DNQ	0	1.2	8.8	DNQ	+5	15.0
2	Nigeria	CAF	0.6	4.8	3.6	4.8	DNQ		13.8
2	New Zealand	OFC	DNQ	0.8	0	3.2	4	+5	13
2	Colombia	CONMEBOL	DNQ	4.8	4.8	3.2	DNQ		12.8
2	South Korea	AFC	1.4	1.6	3.6	DNQ	6		12.6
2	Italy	UEFA	1.4	DNQ	DNQ	DNQ	11		12.4
3	Saudi Arabia	AFC	DNQ	2.4	DNQ	DNQ	4	+5	11.4
3	Senegal	CAF	DNQ	DNQ	DNQ	6.4	4		10.4
3	Argentina	CONMEBOL	DNQ	4.4	DNQ	1.6	3		9
3	Ecuador	CONMEBOL	DNQ	1.6	DNQ	DNQ	2	+5	8.6
3	Ukraine	UEFA	DNQ	DNQ	DNQ	6.4	DNQ		6.4
3	Honduras	CONCACAF	0.6	DNQ	DNQ	2.4	3		6
4	Japan	AFC	DNQ	DNQ	DNQ	DNQ	4		4
4	South Africa	CAF	0.8	DNQ	DNQ	DNQ	1		1.8
4	Panama	CONCACAF	DNQ	0.4	DNQ	0.8	DNQ		1.2
4	Qatar	AFC	DNQ	DNQ	DNQ	0	DNQ		0
4	Tahiti	OFC	0	DNQ	DNQ	0	DNQ		0
4	Norway	UEFA	DNQ	DNQ	DNQ	DNQ	DNQ		0

Teams from Pot 1 were drawn first, followed by Pot 2, Pot 3, and finally Pot 4, with each team (apart from Poland) also drawn to one of the positions within their group. No group could contain more than one team from each confederation.

The draw resulted in the following groups:

Group A
Pos	Team
A1	Poland
A2	Colombia
A3	Tahiti
A4	Senegal

Group B
Pos	Team
B1	Mexico
B2	Italy
B3	Japan
B4	Ecuador

Group C
Pos	Team
C1	Honduras
C2	New Zealand
C3	Uruguay
C4	Norway

Group D
Pos	Team
D1	Qatar
D2	Nigeria
D3	Ukraine
D4	United States

Group E
Pos	Team
E1	Panama
E2	Mali
E3	France
E4	Saudi Arabia

Group F
Pos	Team
F1	Portugal
F2	South Korea
F3	Argentina
F4	South Africa

== Match officials ==
A total of 21 refereeing trios (a referee and two assistant referees), 6 support referees, and 20 video assistant referees were appointed for the tournament.

Confederation	Referee	Assistant referees	Support referee	Video assistant referees
AFC	(Oman) Ahmed Al-Kaf	(Oman) Abu Bakar Al-Amri (Oman) Rashid Al-Ghaithi	(Uzbekistan) Ilgiz Tantashev	(United Arab Emirates) Ammar Al-Jeneibi (Qatar) Khamis Al-Marri (China) Fu Ming
AFC	(Singapore) Muhammad Taqi	(Singapore) Ronnie Koh Min Kiat (Singapore) Abdul Hannan bin Abdul Hasim	(Uzbekistan) Ilgiz Tantashev	(United Arab Emirates) Ammar Al-Jeneibi (Qatar) Khamis Al-Marri (China) Fu Ming
AFC	(Jordan) Adham Makhadmeh	(Jordan) Ahmad Al-Roalle (Jordan) Mohammad Al-Kalaf	(Uzbekistan) Ilgiz Tantashev	(United Arab Emirates) Ammar Al-Jeneibi (Qatar) Khamis Al-Marri (China) Fu Ming
CAF	(Algeria) Mustapha Ghorbal	(Egypt) Mahmoud Ahmed Kamel (Algeria) Mokrane Gourari	(Burundi) Pacifique Ndabihawenimana	(The Gambia) Bakary Gassama (Egypt) Gehad Grisha (Ethiopia) Bamlak Tessema Weyesa
CAF	(Senegal) Maguette N'Diaye	(Cameroon) Elvis Noupue (Burkina Faso) Seydou Tiama	(Burundi) Pacifique Ndabihawenimana	(The Gambia) Bakary Gassama (Egypt) Gehad Grisha (Ethiopia) Bamlak Tessema Weyesa
CAF	(Democratic Republic of the Congo) Jean-Jacques Ndala	(Democratic Republic of the Congo) Olivier Safari (Comoros) Souleimane Amaldine	(Burundi) Pacifique Ndabihawenimana	(The Gambia) Bakary Gassama (Egypt) Gehad Grisha (Ethiopia) Bamlak Tessema Weyesa
CONCACAF	(United States) Ismail Elfath	(United States) Kyle Atkins (United States) Corey Parker	(El Salvador) Iván Barton	(Mexico) Adonai Escobedo (Republic of Ireland) Alan Kelly
CONCACAF	(Mexico) Fernando Guerrero	(Mexico) Pablo Hernández (Mexico) José Martínez	(El Salvador) Iván Barton	(Mexico) Adonai Escobedo (Republic of Ireland) Alan Kelly
CONCACAF	(Honduras) Saíd Martínez	(Honduras) Walter López (Dominican Republic) Helpys Feliz	(El Salvador) Iván Barton	(Mexico) Adonai Escobedo (Republic of Ireland) Alan Kelly
CONMEBOL	(Brazil) Raphael Claus	(Brazil) Danilo Manis (Brazil) Bruno Pires	(Peru) Joel Alarcón	(Chile) Julio Bascuñán (Colombia) Andrés Rojas (Brazil) Wilton Sampaio (Venezuela) Jesús Valenzuela (Bolivia) Gery Vargas
CONMEBOL	(Uruguay) Leodán González	(Uruguay) Richard Trinidad (Uruguay) Martín Soppi	(Peru) Joel Alarcón	(Chile) Julio Bascuñán (Colombia) Andrés Rojas (Brazil) Wilton Sampaio (Venezuela) Jesús Valenzuela (Bolivia) Gery Vargas
CONMEBOL	(Venezuela) Alexis Herrera	(Venezuela) Jorge Urrego (Venezuela) Tulio Moreno	(Peru) Joel Alarcón	(Chile) Julio Bascuñán (Colombia) Andrés Rojas (Brazil) Wilton Sampaio (Venezuela) Jesús Valenzuela (Bolivia) Gery Vargas
CONMEBOL	(Argentina) Fernando Rapallini	(Argentina) Diego Bonfá (Argentina) Gabriel Chade	(Peru) Joel Alarcón	(Chile) Julio Bascuñán (Colombia) Andrés Rojas (Brazil) Wilton Sampaio (Venezuela) Jesús Valenzuela (Bolivia) Gery Vargas
OFC	(French Polynesia) Abdelkader Zitouni	(Tonga) Folio Moeaki (Solomon Islands) Bernard Mutukera	(Papua New Guinea) David Yareboinen	—
UEFA	(France) Benoît Bastien	(France) Hicham Zakrani (France) Frédéric Haquette	(Switzerland) Sandro Schärer	(Portugal) Artur Soares Dias (Italy) Marco Guida (Spain) Alejandro Hernández Hernández (Spain) Juan Martínez Munuera (France) Benoît Millot (Poland) Paweł Raczkowski (Netherlands) Pol van Boekel
UEFA	(Spain) Jesús Gil Manzano	(Spain) Ángel Nevado Rodríguez (Spain) Diego Barbero Sevilla	(Switzerland) Sandro Schärer	(Portugal) Artur Soares Dias (Italy) Marco Guida (Spain) Alejandro Hernández Hernández (Spain) Juan Martínez Munuera (France) Benoît Millot (Poland) Paweł Raczkowski (Netherlands) Pol van Boekel
UEFA	(Slovakia) Ivan Kružliak	(Slovakia) Tomaš Somoláni (Slovakia) Branislav Hancko	(Switzerland) Sandro Schärer	(Portugal) Artur Soares Dias (Italy) Marco Guida (Spain) Alejandro Hernández Hernández (Spain) Juan Martínez Munuera (France) Benoît Millot (Poland) Paweł Raczkowski (Netherlands) Pol van Boekel
UEFA	(Italy) Davide Massa	(Italy) Filippo Meli (Italy) Fabiano Preti	(Switzerland) Sandro Schärer	(Portugal) Artur Soares Dias (Italy) Marco Guida (Spain) Alejandro Hernández Hernández (Spain) Juan Martínez Munuera (France) Benoît Millot (Poland) Paweł Raczkowski (Netherlands) Pol van Boekel
UEFA	(England) Michael Oliver	(England) Simon Bennett (England) Stuart Burt	(Switzerland) Sandro Schärer	(Portugal) Artur Soares Dias (Italy) Marco Guida (Spain) Alejandro Hernández Hernández (Spain) Juan Martínez Munuera (France) Benoît Millot (Poland) Paweł Raczkowski (Netherlands) Pol van Boekel
UEFA	(Germany) Daniel Siebert	(Germany) Jan Seidel (Germany) Rafael Foltyn	(Switzerland) Sandro Schärer	(Portugal) Artur Soares Dias (Italy) Marco Guida (Spain) Alejandro Hernández Hernández (Spain) Juan Martínez Munuera (France) Benoît Millot (Poland) Paweł Raczkowski (Netherlands) Pol van Boekel
UEFA	(Slovenia) Slavko Vinčić	(Slovenia) Tomaž Klančnik (Slovenia) Andraž Kovačič	(Switzerland) Sandro Schärer	(Portugal) Artur Soares Dias (Italy) Marco Guida (Spain) Alejandro Hernández Hernández (Spain) Juan Martínez Munuera (France) Benoît Millot (Poland) Paweł Raczkowski (Netherlands) Pol van Boekel

== Squads ==
Players born on or after 1 January 1999 and on or before 31 December 2003 were eligible to compete in the tournament.

Each team had to name a preliminary squad of between 22 and 50 players. From the preliminary squad, the team had to name a final squad of 21 players (three of whom must be goalkeepers) by the FIFA deadline. Players in the final squad could be replaced by a player from the preliminary squad due to serious injury or illness up to 24 hours prior to kickoff of the team's first match.

== Group stage ==
The top two teams of each group and the four best third-placed teams advanced to the round of 16.

All times are local, CEST (UTC+2).

=== Tiebreakers ===
The ranking of teams in the group stage was determined as follows:

1. Points obtained in all group matches (three points for a win, one for a draw, none for a defeat);
2. Goal difference in all group matches;
3. Number of goals scored in all group matches;
4. Points obtained in the matches played between the teams in question;
5. Goal difference in the matches played between the teams in question;
6. Number of goals scored in the matches played between the teams in question;
7. Fair play points in all group matches (only one deduction could be applied to a player in a single match):
  - Yellow card: −1 points;
  - Indirect red card (second yellow card): −3 points;
  - Direct red card: −4 points;
  - Yellow card and direct red card: −5 points;
8. Drawing of lots.

=== Group A ===
Pos	Team	Pld	W	D	L	GF	GA	GD	Pts	Qualification
1	Senegal	3	2	1	0	5	0	+5	7	Advance to knockout stage
2	Colombia	3	2	0	1	8	2	+6	6	Advance to knockout stage
3	Poland (H)	3	1	1	1	5	2	+3	4	Advance to knockout stage
4	Tahiti	3	0	0	3	0	14	−14	0	

Source: FIFA
Rules for classification: Group stage tiebreakers
(H) Hosts
23 May 2019
18:00

Tahiti	0–3	Senegal
	Report	Sagna 1', 29', 50'

Lublin Stadium, Lublin
Attendance: 4,661
Referee: Muhammad Taqi (Singapore)
23 May 2019
20:30

Poland	0–2	Colombia
	Report	Angulo 23'; Sandoval 90+3'

Łódź Stadium, Łódź
Attendance: 17,463
Referee: Mustapha Ghorbal (Algeria)

26 May 2019
18:00

Senegal	2–0	Colombia
Niane 34' (pen.); Lopy 85' (pen.)	Report

Lublin Stadium, Lublin
Attendance: 10,450
Referee: Michael Oliver (England)
26 May 2019
20:30

Poland	5–0	Tahiti
Bednarczyk 18'; Zylla 37'; Steczyk 39', 61'; Benedyczak 74'	Report

Łódź Stadium, Łódź
Attendance: 15,894
Referee: Ahmed Al-Kaf (Oman)

29 May 2019
20:30

Senegal	0–0	Poland
	Report

Łódź Stadium, Łódź
Attendance: 15,829
Referee: Raphael Claus (Brazil)
29 May 2019
20:30

Colombia	6–0	Tahiti
Sinisterra 8', 37'; Hernández 38', 42', 70'; Caicedo 87'	Report

Lublin Stadium, Lublin
Attendance: 4,693
Referee: Daniel Siebert (Germany)

=== Group B ===
Pos	Team	Pld	W	D	L	GF	GA	GD	Pts	Qualification
1	Italy	3	2	1	0	3	1	+2	7	Advance to knockout stage
2	Japan	3	1	2	0	4	1	+3	5	Advance to knockout stage
3	Ecuador	3	1	1	1	2	2	0	4	Advance to knockout stage
4	Mexico	3	0	0	3	1	6	−5	0	

Source: FIFA
Rules for classification: Group stage tiebreakers
23 May 2019
18:00

Mexico	1–2	Italy
De la Rosa 37'	Report	Frattesi 3'; Ranieri 67'

Gdynia Stadium, Gdynia
Attendance: 7,893
Referee: Raphael Claus (Brazil)
23 May 2019
20:30

Japan	1–1	Ecuador
Yamada 68'	Report	Tagawa 45' (o.g.)

Bydgoszcz Stadium, Bydgoszcz
Attendance: 3,018
Referee: Slavko Vinčić (Slovenia)

26 May 2019
15:30

Mexico	0–3	Japan
	Report	Miyashiro 21', 77'; Tagawa 52'

Gdynia Stadium, Gdynia
Attendance: 4,930
Referee: Daniel Siebert (Germany)
26 May 2019
18:00

Ecuador	0–1	Italy
	Report	Pinamonti 15'

Bydgoszcz Stadium, Bydgoszcz
Attendance: 6,717
Referee: Adham Makhadmeh (Jordan)

29 May 2019
18:00

Ecuador	1–0	Mexico
Plata 12'	Report

Gdynia Stadium, Gdynia
Attendance: 4,208
Referee: Ivan Kružliak (Slovakia)
29 May 2019
18:00

Italy	0–0	Japan
	Report

Bydgoszcz Stadium, Bydgoszcz
Attendance: 6,702
Referee: Mustapha Ghorbal (Algeria)

=== Group C ===
Pos	Team	Pld	W	D	L	GF	GA	GD	Pts	Qualification
1	Uruguay	3	3	0	0	7	1	+6	9	Advance to knockout stage
2	New Zealand	3	2	0	1	7	2	+5	6	Advance to knockout stage
3	Norway	3	1	0	2	13	5	+8	3	
4	Honduras	3	0	0	3	0	19	−19	0	

Source: FIFA
Rules for classification: Group stage tiebreakers
24 May 2019
18:00

Honduras	0–5	New Zealand
	Report	Diego 8' (o.g.); Waine 17', 27'; Singh 51'; Conroy 90+1'

Lublin Stadium, Lublin
Attendance: 4,484
Referee: Alexis Herrera (Venezuela)
24 May 2019
20:30

Uruguay	3–1	Norway
Núñez 21'; Ginella 29'; B. Rodríguez 87'	Report	Borchgrevink 47'

Łódź Stadium, Łódź
Attendance: 4,626
Referee: Ismail Elfath (United States)

27 May 2019
18:00

Honduras	0–2	Uruguay
	Report	Acevedo 41'; Schiappacasse 90+1'

Lublin Stadium, Lublin
Attendance: 6,173
Referee: Jesús Gil Manzano (Spain)
27 May 2019
20:30

Norway	0–2	New Zealand
	Report	Stensness 71'; Kitolano 83' (o.g.)

Łódź Stadium, Łódź
Attendance: 2,165
Referee: Jean-Jacques Ndala (DR Congo)

30 May 2019
18:00

Norway	12–0	Honduras
Haaland 7', 20', 36' (pen.), 43', 50', 67', 77', 88', 90'; Østigård 30'; Hauge 46'; Markovic 82'	Report

Lublin Stadium, Lublin
Attendance: 5,646
Referee: Muhammad Taqi (Singapore)
30 May 2019
18:00

New Zealand	0–2	Uruguay
	Report	Núñez 40'; B. Rodríguez 90+5'

Łódź Stadium, Łódź
Attendance: 4,385
Referee: Adham Makhadmeh (Jordan)

=== Group D ===
Pos	Team	Pld	W	D	L	GF	GA	GD	Pts	Qualification
1	Ukraine	3	2	1	0	4	2	+2	7	Advance to knockout stage
2	United States	3	2	0	1	4	2	+2	6	Advance to knockout stage
3	Nigeria	3	1	1	1	5	3	+2	4	Advance to knockout stage
4	Qatar	3	0	0	3	0	6	−6	0	

Source: FIFA
Rules for classification: Group stage tiebreakers
24 May 2019
18:00

Qatar	0–4	Nigeria
	Report	Effiom 12'; Offia 24'; Dele-Bashiru 68'; Salawudeen 74'

Tychy Stadium, Tychy
Attendance: 3,010
Referee: Fernando Guerrero (Mexico)
24 May 2019
20:30

Ukraine	2–1	United States
Buletsa 26'; Popov 51'	Report	Servania 32'

Bielsko-Biała Stadium, Bielsko-Biała
Attendance: 4,310
Referee: Maguette N'Diaye (Senegal)

27 May 2019
18:00

Qatar	0–1	Ukraine
	Report	Popov 59'

Tychy Stadium, Tychy
Attendance: 3,513
Referee: Saíd Martínez (Honduras)
27 May 2019
20:30

United States	2–0	Nigeria
Soto 18', 46'	Report

Bielsko-Biała Stadium, Bielsko-Biała
Attendance: 3,427
Referee: Benoît Bastien (France)

30 May 2019
20:30

United States	1–0	Qatar
Weah 76'	Report

Tychy Stadium, Tychy
Attendance: 3,651
Referee: Abdelkader Zitouni (Tahiti)
30 May 2019
20:30

Nigeria	1–1	Ukraine
Tijani 51' (pen.)	Report	Sikan 30'

Bielsko-Biała Stadium, Bielsko-Biała
Attendance: 3,143
Referee: Fernando Rapallini (Argentina)

=== Group E ===
Pos	Team	Pld	W	D	L	GF	GA	GD	Pts	Qualification
1	France	3	3	0	0	7	2	+5	9	Advance to knockout stage
2	Mali	3	1	1	1	7	7	0	4	Advance to knockout stage
3	Panama	3	1	1	1	3	4	−1	4	Advance to knockout stage
4	Saudi Arabia	3	0	0	3	4	8	−4	0	

Source: FIFA
Rules for classification: Group stage tiebreakers
25 May 2019
18:00

Panama	1–1	Mali
Valanta 87' (pen.)	Report	Konté 39'

Bydgoszcz Stadium, Bydgoszcz
Attendance: 2,876
Referee: Davide Massa (Italy)
25 May 2019
18:00

France	2–0	Saudi Arabia
Fofana 43'; Gouiri 75'	Report

Gdynia Stadium, Gdynia
Attendance: 6,100
Referee: Fernando Rapallini (Argentina)

28 May 2019
18:00

Panama	0–2	France
	Report	Zagadou 44'; Cuisance 52'

Bydgoszcz Stadium, Bydgoszcz
Attendance: 5,656
Referee: Leodán González (Uruguay)
28 May 2019
20:30

Saudi Arabia	3–4	Mali
Al-Buraikan 9'; Tambakti 20' (pen.); Al-Ghannam 63'	Report	S. Koïta 36'; Koné 54'; B. Traoré 70'; Camara 90'

Gdynia Stadium, Gdynia
Attendance: 1,707
Referee: Slavko Vinčić (Slovenia)

31 May 2019
18:00

Saudi Arabia	1–2	Panama
Al-Buraikan 53'	Report	Mackenzie 7'; Valanta 78'

Bydgoszcz Stadium, Bydgoszcz
Attendance: 3,305
Referee: Jean-Jacques Ndala (DR Congo)
31 May 2019
18:00

Mali	2–3	France
S. Koïta 14'; Diakite 90+5'	Report	Cuisance 12'; Diaby 65' (pen.); Gouiri 87'

Gdynia Stadium, Gdynia
Attendance: 5,445
Referee: Saíd Martínez (Honduras)

=== Group F ===
Pos	Team	Pld	W	D	L	GF	GA	GD	Pts	Qualification
1	Argentina	3	2	0	1	8	4	+4	6	Advance to knockout stage
2	South Korea	3	2	0	1	3	2	+1	6	Advance to knockout stage
3	Portugal	3	1	1	1	2	3	−1	4	
4	South Africa	3	0	1	2	3	7	−4	1	

Source: FIFA
Rules for classification: Group stage tiebreakers
25 May 2019
15:30

Portugal	1–0	South Korea
Trincão 7'	Report

Bielsko-Biała Stadium, Bielsko-Biała
Attendance: 6,344
Referee: Abdelkader Zitouni (Tahiti)
25 May 2019
20:30

Argentina	5–2	South Africa
Vera 4'; Barco 63' (pen.), 71'; Álvarez 78'; Gaich 90+2'	Report	Phillips 23'; Foster 85' (pen.)

Tychy Stadium, Tychy
Attendance: 8,351
Referee: Ivan Kružliak (Slovakia)

28 May 2019
18:00

Portugal	0–2	Argentina
	Report	Gaich 33'; Pérez 84'

Bielsko-Biała Stadium, Bielsko-Biała
Attendance: 11,874
Referee: Ismail Elfath (United States)
28 May 2019
20:30

South Africa	0–1	South Korea
	Report	Kim Hyun-woo 69'

Tychy Stadium, Tychy
Attendance: 2,698
Referee: Fernando Guerrero (Mexico)

31 May 2019
20:30

South Africa	1–1	Portugal
Monyane 53' (pen.)	Report	Leão 19'

Bielsko-Biała Stadium, Bielsko-Biała
Attendance: 7,429
Referee: Alexis Herrera (Venezuela)
31 May 2019
20:30

South Korea	2–1	Argentina
Oh Se-hun 42'; Cho Young-wook 57'	Report	Ferreira 88'

Tychy Stadium, Tychy
Attendance: 10,129
Referee: Benoît Bastien (France)

=== Ranking of third-placed teams ===
The four best third-placed teams from the six groups advanced to the knockout stage along with the six group winners and six runners-up.

Pos	Grp	Team	Pld	W	D	L	GF	GA	GD	Pts	Qualification
1	A	Poland	3	1	1	1	5	2	+3	4	Knockout stage
2	D	Nigeria	3	1	1	1	5	3	+2	4	Knockout stage
3	B	Ecuador	3	1	1	1	2	2	0	4	Knockout stage
4	E	Panama	3	1	1	1	3	4	−1	4	Knockout stage
5	F	Portugal	3	1	1	1	2	3	−1	4	
6	C	Norway	3	1	0	2	13	5	+8	3	

Source: FIFA
Rules for classification: 1) Points; 2) Goal difference; 3) Goals scored; 4) Fair play points; 5) Drawing of lots.

== Knockout stage ==
In the knockout stage, if a match was level at the end of 90 minutes of normal playing time, extra time would be played (two periods of 15 minutes each), where each team was allowed to make a fourth substitution. If still tied after extra time, the match would be decided by a penalty shoot-out to determine the winner.

In the round of 16, the four third-placed teams would be matched with the winners of groups A, B, C, and D. The specific match-ups involving the third-placed teams depended on which four third-placed teams qualified for the round of 16:

Third-placed teams qualified from groups						1A vs	1B vs	1C vs	1D vs
A	B	C	D			3C	3D	3A	3B
A	B	C		E		3C	3A	3B	3E
A	B	C			F	3C	3A	3B	3F
A	B		D	E		3D	3A	3B	3E
A	B		D		F	3D	3A	3B	3F
A	B			E	F	3E	3A	3B	3F
A		C	D	E		3C	3D	3A	3E
A		C	D		F	3C	3D	3A	3F
A		C		E	F	3C	3A	3F	3E
A			D	E	F	3D	3A	3F	3E
	B	C	D	E		3C	3D	3B	3E
	B	C	D		F	3C	3D	3B	3F
	B	C		E	F	3E	3C	3B	3F
	B		D	E	F	3E	3D	3B	3F
		C	D	E	F	3C	3D	3F	3E

=== Bracket ===
Round of 16
2 June – Łódź
Colombia (p)	1 (5)
New Zealand	1 (4)
3 June – Tychy
Ukraine	4
Panama	1
2 June – Gdynia
Italy	1
Poland	0
4 June – Bielsko-Biała
Argentina	2 (4)
Mali (p)	2 (5)
4 June – Bydgoszcz
France	2
United States	3
3 June – Lublin
Uruguay	1
Ecuador	3
4 June – Lublin
Japan	0
South Korea	1
3 June – Łódź
Senegal	2
Nigeria	1

Quarter-finals
7 June – Łódź
Colombia	0
Ukraine	1
7 June – Tychy
Italy	4
Mali	2
8 June – Gdynia
United States	1
Ecuador	2
8 June – Bielsko-Biała
South Korea (p)	3 (3)
Senegal	3 (2)

Semi-finals
11 June – Gdynia
Ukraine	1
Italy	0
11 June – Lublin
Ecuador	0
South Korea	1

Final
15 June – Łódź
Ukraine	3
South Korea	1
Third place match
14 June – Gdynia
Italy	0
Ecuador (a.e.t.)	1

=== Round of 16 ===
2 June 2019
17:30

Italy	1–0	Poland
Pinamonti 38' (pen.)	Report

Gdynia Stadium, Gdynia
Attendance: 10,232
Referee: Jesús Gil Manzano (Spain)

2 June 2019
20:30

Colombia	1–1 (a.e.t.)	New Zealand
Reyes 11'	Report	Just 35'
Penalties
Vera (penalty missed); Carbonero (penalty missed); Perea (penalty scored); Sandoval (penalty scored); Angulo (penalty scored); Balanta (penalty scored); Cuesta (penalty scored)	5–4	(penalty scored) Singh; (penalty missed) Bell; (penalty scored) Mata; (penalty missed) Stensness; (penalty scored) McCowatt; (penalty scored) Cacace; (penalty missed) Conroy

Łódź Stadium, Łódź
Attendance: 9,283
Referee: Ahmed Al-Kaf (Oman)

3 June 2019
17:30

Uruguay	1–3	Ecuador
R. Araújo 11'	Report	Alvarado 31' (pen.); Quintero 75'; Plata 83' (pen.)

Lublin Stadium, Lublin
Attendance: 10,562
Referee: Michael Oliver (England)

3 June 2019
17:30

Ukraine	4–1	Panama
Sikan 23', 45+1'; Popov 41'; Buletsa 83'	Report	Walker 50'

Tychy Stadium, Tychy
Attendance: 7,219
Referee: Leodán González (Uruguay)

3 June 2019
20:30

Senegal	2–1	Nigeria
Sagna 36'; Niane 45+3'	Report	Makanjuola 50'

Łódź Stadium, Łódź
Attendance: 6,854
Referee: Davide Massa (Italy)

4 June 2019
17:30

Japan	0–1	South Korea
	Report	Oh Se-hun 84'

Lublin Stadium, Lublin
Attendance: 10,021
Referee: Maguette N'Diaye (Senegal)

4 June 2019
17:30

France	2–3	United States
Gouiri 41'; Alioui 55'	Report	Soto 25', 74'; Rennicks 83'

Bydgoszcz Stadium, Bydgoszcz
Attendance: 8,469
Referee: Raphael Claus (Brazil)

4 June 2019
20:30

Argentina	2–2 (a.e.t.)	Mali
Gaich 49'; Diaby 91' (o.g.)	Report	Diaby 67'; Konté 120+1'
Penalties
Pérez (penalty scored); Chancalay (penalty missed); Gaich (penalty scored); Sosa (penalty scored); Vera (penalty scored)	4–5	(penalty scored) Dramé; (penalty scored) B. Traoré; (penalty scored) S. Koïta; (penalty scored) Diaby; (penalty scored) Sissoko

Bielsko-Biała Stadium, Bielsko-Biała
Attendance: 9,146
Referee: Fernando Guerrero (Mexico)

=== Quarter-finals ===
7 June 2019
15:30

Colombia	0–1	Ukraine
	Report	Sikan 11'

Łódź Stadium, Łódź
Attendance: 8,443
Referee: Mustapha Ghorbal (Algeria)

7 June 2019
18:30

Italy	4–2	Mali
Koné 12' (o.g.); Pinamonti 60', 83' (pen.); Frattesi 84'	Report	S. Koïta 38'; Camara 79'

Tychy Stadium, Tychy
Attendance: 11,567
Referee: Ismail Elfath (United States)

8 June 2019
17:30

United States	1–2	Ecuador
Weah 36'	Report	Cifuentes 30'; Espinoza 43'

Gdynia Stadium, Gdynia
Attendance: 6,389
Referee: Benoît Bastien (France)

8 June 2019
20:30

South Korea	3–3 (a.e.t.)	Senegal
Lee Kang-in 62' (pen.); Lee Ji-sol 90+8'; Cho Young-wook 96'	Report	Diagné 37'; Niane 76' (pen.); Ciss 120+1'
Penalties
Kim Jung-min (penalty missed); Cho Young-wook (penalty missed); Um Won-sang (penalty scored); Choi Jun (penalty scored); Oh Se-hun (penalty scored)	3–2	(penalty scored) Danfa; (penalty missed) Mbow; (penalty scored) Ciss; (penalty missed) Dia N'Diaye; (penalty missed) Diagné

Bielsko-Biała Stadium, Bielsko-Biała
Attendance: 10,627
Referee: Leodán González (Uruguay)

=== Semi-finals ===
11 June 2019
17:30

Ukraine	1–0	Italy
Buletsa 65'	Report

Gdynia Stadium, Gdynia
Attendance: 7,776
Referee: Raphael Claus (Brazil)

11 June 2019
20:30

Ecuador	0–1	South Korea
	Report	Choi Jun 39'

Lublin Stadium, Lublin
Attendance: 12,614
Referee: Michael Oliver (England)

=== Third place match ===
14 June 2019
20:30

Italy	0–1 (a.e.t.)	Ecuador
	Report	Mina 104'

Gdynia Stadium, Gdynia
Attendance: 8,937
Referee: Jesús Gil Manzano (Spain)

=== Final ===
15 June 2019
18:00

Ukraine	3–1	South Korea
Supryaha 34', 53'; Tsitaishvili 89'	Report	Lee Kang-in 5' (pen.)

Łódź Stadium, Łódź
Attendance: 16,344
Referee: Ismail Elfath (United States)

== Awards ==
The following awards were given at the conclusion of the tournament. They were all sponsored by Adidas, except for the FIFA Fair Play Award.

Golden Ball	Silver Ball	Bronze Ball
(South Korea) Lee Kang-in	(Ukraine) Serhiy Buletsa	(Ecuador) Gonzalo Plata
Golden Boot	Silver Boot	Bronze Boot
(Norway) Erling Haaland (9 goals, 0 assists, 270 minutes played)	(Ukraine) Danylo Sikan (4 goals, 0 assists, 280 minutes played)	(Senegal) Amadou Sagna (4 goals, 0 assists, 334 minutes played)
Golden Glove
(Ukraine) Andriy Lunin
FIFA Fair Play Trophy
Japan

== Goalscorers ==
The top scorer of the tournament was Erling Haaland; all his nine goals were scored in the same game.

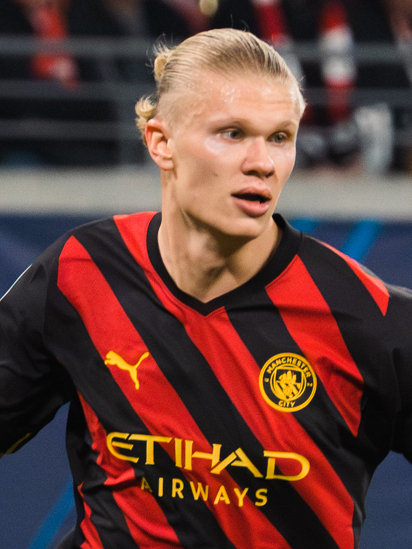
Erling Haaland, top scorer

There were 153 goals scored in 52 matches, for an average of 2.94 goals per match.

9 goals

- (Norway) Erling Haaland

4 goals

- (Italy) Andrea Pinamonti
- (Senegal) Amadou Sagna
- (Ukraine) Danylo Sikan
- (United States) Sebastian Soto

3 goals

- (Argentina) Adolfo Gaich
- (Colombia) Cucho Hernández
- (France) Amine Gouiri
- (Mali) Sékou Koïta
- (Senegal) Ibrahima Niane
- (Ukraine) Serhiy Buletsa
- (Ukraine) Denys Popov

2 goals

- (Argentina) Ezequiel Barco
- (Colombia) Luis Sinisterra
- (Ecuador) Gonzalo Plata
- (France) Michaël Cuisance
- (Italy) Davide Frattesi
- (Japan) Taisei Miyashiro
- (Mali) Mohamed Camara
- (Mali) Boubacar Konté
- (New Zealand) Ben Waine
- (Panama) Diego Valanta
- (Poland) Dominik Steczyk
- (Saudi Arabia) Firas Al-Buraikan
- (South Korea) Cho Young-wook
- (South Korea) Lee Kang-in
- (South Korea) Oh Se-hun
- (Ukraine) Vladyslav Supryaha
- (United States) Timothy Weah
- (Uruguay) Darwin Núñez
- (Uruguay) Brian Rodríguez

1 goal

- (Argentina) Julián Álvarez
- (Argentina) Cristian Ferreira
- (Argentina) Nehuén Pérez
- (Argentina) Fausto Vera
- (Colombia) Iván Angulo
- (Colombia) Deiber Caicedo
- (Colombia) Andrés Reyes
- (Colombia) Luis Sandoval
- (Ecuador) Alexander Alvarado
- (Ecuador) José Cifuentes
- (Ecuador) Jhon Espinoza
- (Ecuador) Richard Mina
- (Ecuador) Sergio Quintero
- (France) Nabil Alioui
- (France) Moussa Diaby
- (France) Youssouf Fofana
- (France) Dan-Axel Zagadou
- (Italy) Luca Ranieri
- (Japan) Kyosuke Tagawa
- (Japan) Kota Yamada
- (Mali) Abdoulaye Diaby
- (Mali) Ousmane Diakite
- (Mali) Ibrahima Koné
- (Mali) Boubacar Traoré
- (Mexico) Roberto de la Rosa
- (New Zealand) Matt Conroy
- (New Zealand) Elijah Just
- (New Zealand) Sarpreet Singh
- (New Zealand) Gianni Stensness
- (Nigeria) Tom Dele-Bashiru
- (Nigeria) Maxwell Effiom
- (Nigeria) Success Makanjuola
- (Nigeria) Okechukwu Offia
- (Nigeria) Aliu Salawudeen
- (Nigeria) Muhamed Tijani
- (Norway) Christian Borchgrevink
- (Norway) Jens Petter Hauge
- (Norway) Eman Markovic
- (Norway) Leo Skiri Østigård
- (Panama) Axel McKenzie
- (Panama) Ernesto Walker
- (Poland) Jakub Bednarczyk
- (Poland) Adrian Benedyczak
- (Poland) Marcel Zylla
- (Portugal) Rafael Leão
- (Portugal) Trincão
- (Saudi Arabia) Khalid Al-Ghannam
- (Saudi Arabia) Hassan Tambakti
- (Senegal) Amadou Ciss
- (Senegal) Cavin Diagné
- (Senegal) Dion Lopy
- (South Africa) Lyle Foster
- (South Africa) James Monyane
- (South Africa) Keenan Phillips
- (South Korea) Choi Jun
- (South Korea) Kim Hyun-woo
- (South Korea) Lee Ji-sol
- (Ukraine) Heorhiy Tsitaishvili
- (United States) Justin Rennicks
- (United States) Brandon Servania
- (Uruguay) Nicolás Acevedo
- (Uruguay) Ronald Araújo
- (Uruguay) Francisco Ginella
- (Uruguay) Nicolás Schiappacasse

1 own goal

- (Honduras) Darwin Diego (against New Zealand)
- (Japan) Kyosuke Tagawa (against Ecuador)
- (Mali) Abdoulaye Diaby (against Argentina)
- (Mali) Ibrahima Koné (against Italy)
- (Norway) John Kitolano (against New Zealand)

== Marketing ==
=== Sponsorship ===
FIFA partners	National Supporters
Adidas; Coca-Cola; Hyundai; Qatar Airways; Visa; Wanda Group	Conotoxia
