= Kim Woo-seok =

Kim Woo-seok may refer to:

- Kim Woo-seok (actor), South Korean actor
- Kim Woo-seok (footballer), South Korean footballer
- Kim Woo-seok (singer), UP10TION and X1 member
