= Sergio Quintero =

Ecuadorian footballer (born 1999)

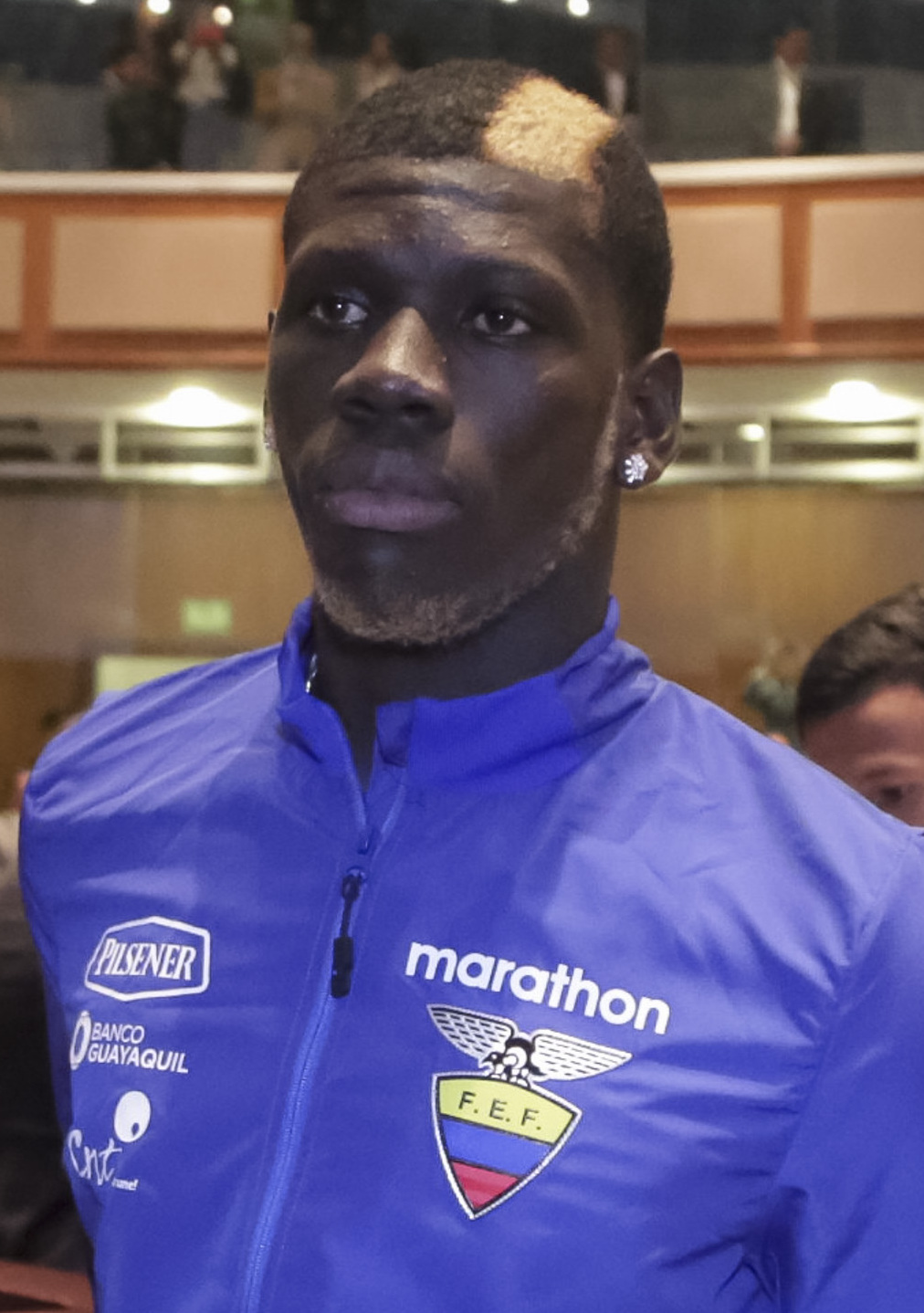

Personal information
- Full name: Sergio Saúl Quintero Chavez
- Date of birth: 12 March 1999 (age 27)
- Place of birth: San Lorenzo, Ecuador
- Height: 1.81 m (5 ft 11 in)
- Position: Defensive midfielder

Team information
- Current team: CS Emelec
- Number: 6

Senior career*
Years	Team	Apps	(Gls)
2016	Cumbayá FC		
2017–2019	Imbabura		
2020–2022	Barcelona SC	5	(0)
2021	→ Olmedo (loan)	19	(2)
2022	Sporting Covilhã	5	(0)
2023–2024	Aucas	5	(0)
2023	→ Mushuc Runa (loan)	6	(0)
2024	Esteghlal Khuzestan	0	(0)
2024–2025	Academia AV25		
2025–	CS Emelec	21	(0)

International career
2018–2019	Ecuador U-20	14	(1)
2019–2020	Ecuador U-23	5	(0)
Medal record
Men's football
Representing Ecuador
FIFA U-20 World Cup
Third place	2019 Poland
- * Club domestic league appearances and goals as of 19:21, 15 February 2026 (UTC)

Sergio Saúl Quintero Chavez (born 9 May 1999) is an Ecuadorian footballer who plays as a defensive midfielder for CS Emelec.

Quintero goes by the nickname La Máquina which means The Machine.

== Club career ==
=== Early years ===
Born and raised in San Lorenzo, Quintero left his native town at the age of 12 to try out at Independiente del Valle. However, he was rejected and returned to San Lorenzo to study.

When Quintero was 16 years old, the national team went to do some tests in San Lorenzo, where Quintero later became one out of six selected players. The six players, including Quintero, went on trials at several clubs, however, they were rejected by them all. Quintero then ended up joining Cumbayá FC. He got his debut for the club and played there for one year.

==== Later years and international career ====
After leaving Cumbayá, Quintero moved to Ibarra and later went on a trial at Mushuc Runa, who wanted to sign him, but couldn't register him.

Quintero continued to study in Ibarra and ended up joining Imbabura SC, also in Ibarra, at the age of 17 in 2017. Quintero suddenly got the opportunity to show himself of to the U-20 national team. After getting his debut for the U-20 national team in November 2018, he was also summoned to the 2019 South American U-20 Championship-playing squad, who ended up winning the tournament. In May–June 2019, he was also a part of the bronze-winning U-20 national team in the 2019 FIFA U-20 World Cup.

He ended up staying at Imbabura until the end of 2019.

=== Barcelona SC ===
After the failed negotiations with Celtic and failed move to Emelec, Quintero signed a five-year contract with Barcelona SC on 27 December 2020. He got his official debut for Barcelona on 22 February 2020 against Delfín S.C. in the Ecuadorian Serie A.

==== Loan to Olmedo ====
To gain some more minutes, after playing only 273 minutes in the 2020 season and sitting on the bench without coming on in the first four out of five games of the 2021 season, Quintero was loaned out to fellow league club C.D. Olmedo on 25 March 2021 for the rest of the year.

On 1 November 2021 Olmedo confirmed, that Quintero had been fired by the club and sent back to Barcelona. Through a statement, the club explained that the decision was made after a series of events, actions and versions issued by the player: We will not tolerate disrespect for the history of this noble institution, its fans, its coaching staff and players, the statement said. The reason behind Quintero's exclusion stemmed from some statements that he had published in a live broadcast on his social media, where he - among other things - pointed out how little interest he had in the team, following a 5–0 defeat on 31 October against Independiente del Valle, which resulted in Olmedo being relegated to the Ecuadorian Serie B for the 2022 season.

==== Return to Barcelona ====
After the controversial departure from Olmedo, Quintero returned to Barcelona SC. However, in February 2022, it was reported, that he wasn't a part of the squad, even though he was still under contract.

=== Sporting Covilhã ===
On 22 July 2022, Quintero joined Liga Portugal 2 side Sporting Covilhã, signing a deal until June 2024. However, on 3 November 2022, the club announced that Quintero's contract had been terminated. The reason was however unknown.

=== Aucas ===
In December 2022, ahead of the 2023 season, Quintero signed with Aucas.

Due to lack of playing time, Quintero joined Mushuc Runa in August 2023 on loan. Independence of Khuzestan

=== Esteghlal Khozestan ===
On 6 March 2024 Quintero was presented in the Persian Gulf Pro League club Esteghlal Khuzestan. On 9 April 2024, the media reported that Quintero had left the club after contracting hepatitis B.

=== Return to Colombia ===
In September 2024, Quintero moved to Colombian lower-league side Academia AV25.
