= Stuart Burt =

English football referee

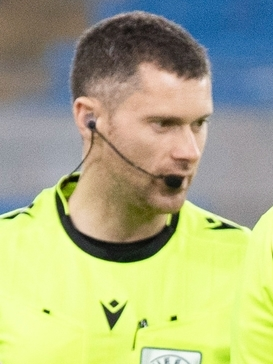
- Bert in 2020
- Born: 1984 or 1985 (age 40–41); Northampton, England

Stuart Burt (born 1984 or 1985) is an English football referee. He began refereeing in the Premier League in 2009 and is one of four officials to have officiated over 500 matches in the league. He has selected to officiate in both 2022 and 2026 World Cups.
