= Yu In-soo =

South Korean footballer (born 1994)

- Yu with in 2026

Personal information
- Full name: Yu In-soo
- Date of birth: 28 December 1994 (age 31)
- Place of birth: Yeonsu South Korea
- Height: 1.77 m (5 ft 10 in)
- Position: Attacking midfielder

Team information
- Current team: Jeju SK
- Number: 17

Youth career
- 2012–2015: Kwangwoon University

Senior career*
| Years | Team | Apps | (Gls) |
| 2016–2019 | FC Tokyo | 16 | (1) |
| 2016–2017 | → FC Tokyo U-23 (loan) | 46 | (19) |
| 2018 | → Avispa Fukuoka (loan) | 31 | (1) |
| 2019 | → FC Tokyo U-23 (loan) | 13 | (3) |
| 2020–2022 | Seongnam FC | 29 | (3) |
| 2021–2022 | → Gimcheon Sangmu (draft) | 38 | (3) |
| 2023–2024 | Gangwon FC | 55 | (3) |
| 2025– | Jeju SK | 53 | (4) |

International career^{‡}
| 2015-2016 | South Korea U23 | 9 | (0) |
- * Club domestic league appearances and goals as of 3 August 2026 ‡ National team caps and goals as of 10 November 2024

Yu In-soo (Korean: 유인수; born 28 December 1994) is a South Korean footballer who plays for Jeju SK.

He formerly played for FC Tokyo from 2016 until 2019.

== Club statistics ==
Updated to 10 November 2024.

| Club performance | | | League | | Cup | | League Cup | | Continental | | Other | | Total | |
| Season | Club | League | Apps | Goals | Apps | Goals | Apps | Goals | Apps | Goals | Apps | Goals | Apps | Goals |
| Japan | | | League | | Emperor's Cup | | J.League Cup | | AFC | | Other | | Total | |
|---|---|---|---|---|---|---|---|---|---|---|---|---|---|---|
| 2016 | FC Tokyo | J1 League | 5 | 1 | 0 | 0 | 1 | 0 | 0 | 0 | - | | 6 | 1 |
| 2017 | FC Tokyo | J1 League | 6 | 0 | 1 | 0 | 3 | 0 | - | | - | | 10 | 0 |
| 2018 | Avispa Fukuoka | J2 League | 31 | 1 | 2 | 0 | - | | - | | - | | 33 | 1 |
| 2019 | FC Tokyo | J1 League | 5 | 0 | 1 | 0 | 4 | 1 | - | | - | | 10 | 1 |
| South Korea | | | League | | KFA Cup | | League Cup | | AFC | | Other | | Total | |
| 2020 | Seongnam FC | K League 1 | 23 | 2 | 1 | 0 | - | | - | | - | | 24 | 2 |
| 2021 | Gimcheon Sangmu | K League 2 | 19 | 1 | 1 | 0 | - | | - | | - | | 20 | 1 |
| 2022 | Gimcheon Sangmu | K League 1 | 19 | 2 | 0 | 0 | - | | - | | - | | 19 | 2 |
| 2022 | Seongnam FC | K League 1 | 6 | 1 | - | | - | | - | | - | | 6 | 1 |
| 2023 | Gangwon FC | K League 1 | 25 | 1 | 2 | 1 | - | | - | | 2 (Note: Appearance in K League Promotion-Relegation play-offs) | 0 | 29 | 2 |
| 2024 | Gangwon FC | K League 1 | 27 | 2 | 2 | 0 | - | | - | | - | | 29 | 2 |
| Career total | | | 166 | 11 | 10 | 1 | 8 | 1 | 0 | 0 | 2 | 0 | 186 | 13 |

== Reserves performance ==
Last Updated: 31 December 2019

| Club performance | | | League | | Total | |
| Season | Club | League | Apps | Goals | Apps | Goals |
| Japan | | | League | | Total | |
|---|---|---|---|---|---|---|
| 2016 | FC Tokyo U-23 | J3 | 26 | 11 | 26 | 11 |
| 2017 | FC Tokyo U-23 | J3 | 20 | 8 | 20 | 8 |
| 2019 | FC Tokyo U-23 | J3 | 13 | 3 | 13 | 3 |
| Career total | | | 59 | 22 | 59 | 22 |
