= Keenan Phillips =

South African footballer

Personal information
- Full name: Keenan Leigh Phillips
- Date of birth: 7 February 2000 (age 26)
- Place of birth: Cape Town, South Africa
- Height: 1.77 m (5 ft 10 in)
- Position: Defender

Team information
- Current team: Golden Arrows
- Number: 33

Youth career
- –2020: Bidvest Wits

Senior career*
Years	Team	Apps	(Gls)
2020	Bidvest Wits	4	(0)
2021–2023	SuperSport United	43	(0)
2023–2024	Moroka Swallows	14	(1)
2024–	Golden Arrows	34	(3)

International career^{‡}
2019	South Africa U20	5	(1)
- * Club domestic league appearances and goals as of 4 January 2026 ‡ National team caps and goals as of 27 August 2020

Keenan Leigh Phillips (born 7 February 2000) is a South African soccer player currently playing as a right-back for Golden Arrows.

== Career statistics ==
As of 27 August 2020.

Club	Season	League			National Cup		League Cup		Continental		Other		Total	
Club	Season	Division	Apps	Goals	Apps	Goals	Apps	Goals	Apps	Goals	Apps	Goals	Apps	Goals
Bidvest Wits	2019–20	South African Premier Division	2	0	0	0	0	0	0	0	0	0	2	0
Career total			2	0	0	0	0	0	0	0	0	0	2	0
