= Lee Ji-sol =

Korean association football player

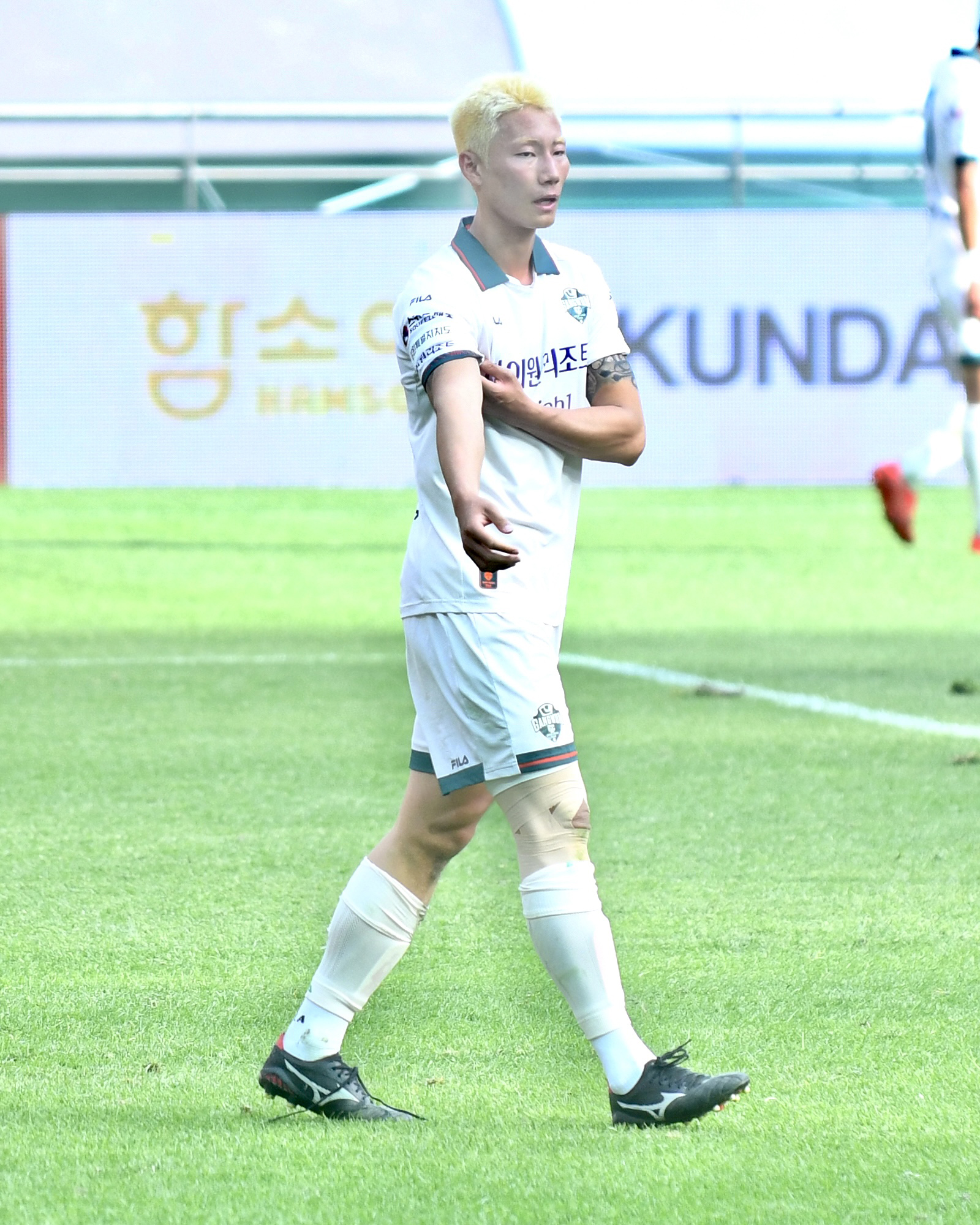
- Lee in 2023

Personal information
- Date of birth: 9 July 1999 (age 27)
- Place of birth: South Korea
- Height: 1.85 m (6 ft 1 in)
- Position: Defender

Team information
- Current team: Suwon FC
- Number: 20

Senior career*
Years	Team	Apps	(Gls)
2018–2021	Daejeon Citizen	67	(1)
2022–2023	Jeju United	16	(2)
2023–2024	Gangwon FC	12	(1)
2025–	Suwon FC	34	(1)

International career^{‡}
2016	South Korea U17	2 (Note: excludes one appearance against non-national team.)	(2)
2018–2019	South Korea U20	16 (Note: excludes three appearances against u23 national teams.)	(1)
2021	South Korea U23	2	(0)
Medal record
Men's football
Representing South Korea
FIFA U-20 World Cup
Runner-up	2019 Poland
AFC U-19 Championship
Runner-up	2018 Indonesia
- * Club domestic league appearances and goals as of 5 August 2026 ‡ National team caps and goals as of 15 June 2021

- Lee Ji-sol
- Hangul: 이지솔
- RR: I Jisol
- MR: I Chisol

Lee Ji-sol (Korean: 이지솔; born 9 July 1999) is a South Korean footballer currently playing as a defender for Suwon FC.

== Career statistics ==
=== Club ===
As of 27 May 2025

Appearances and goals by club, season and competition
Club	Season	League			National cup (Note: Includes Korean FA Cup)		Continental		Other		Total	
Club	Season	Division	Apps	Goals	Apps	Goals	Apps	Goals	Apps	Goals	Apps	Goals
Daejeon Citizen	2018	K League 2	2	0	0	0	—		2 (Note: Appearance in K League Promotion-Relegation play-offs)	0	4	0
Daejeon Citizen	2019	K League 2	23	1	0	0	—		—		23	1
Daejeon Citizen	2020	K League 2	20	0	3	0	—		1	0	24	0
Daejeon Citizen	2021	K League 2	22	0	1	0	—		4	0	27	0
Daejeon Citizen	Total		67	1	4	0	—		7	0	78	1
Jeju United	2022	K League 1	16	0	2	0	—		—		18	0
Jeju United	2023	K League 1	0	0	0	0	—		—		0	0
Jeju United	Total		16	0	2	0	—		—		18	0
Gangwon FC	2023	K League 1	6	1	—		—		0	0	6	1
Gangwon FC	2024	K League 1	6	0	2	0	—		—		8	0
Gangwon FC	Total		12	1	2	0	—		0	0	14	1
Suwon FC	2025	K League 1	12	0	0	0	—		—		12	0
Career total			107	2	8	0	—		7	0	122	2

== Honours ==
=== International ===
==== South Korea U20 ====
- FIFA U-20 World Cup runner-up: 2019
