= Kim Young-bin (footballer, born 1991) =

South Korean footballer (born 1991)

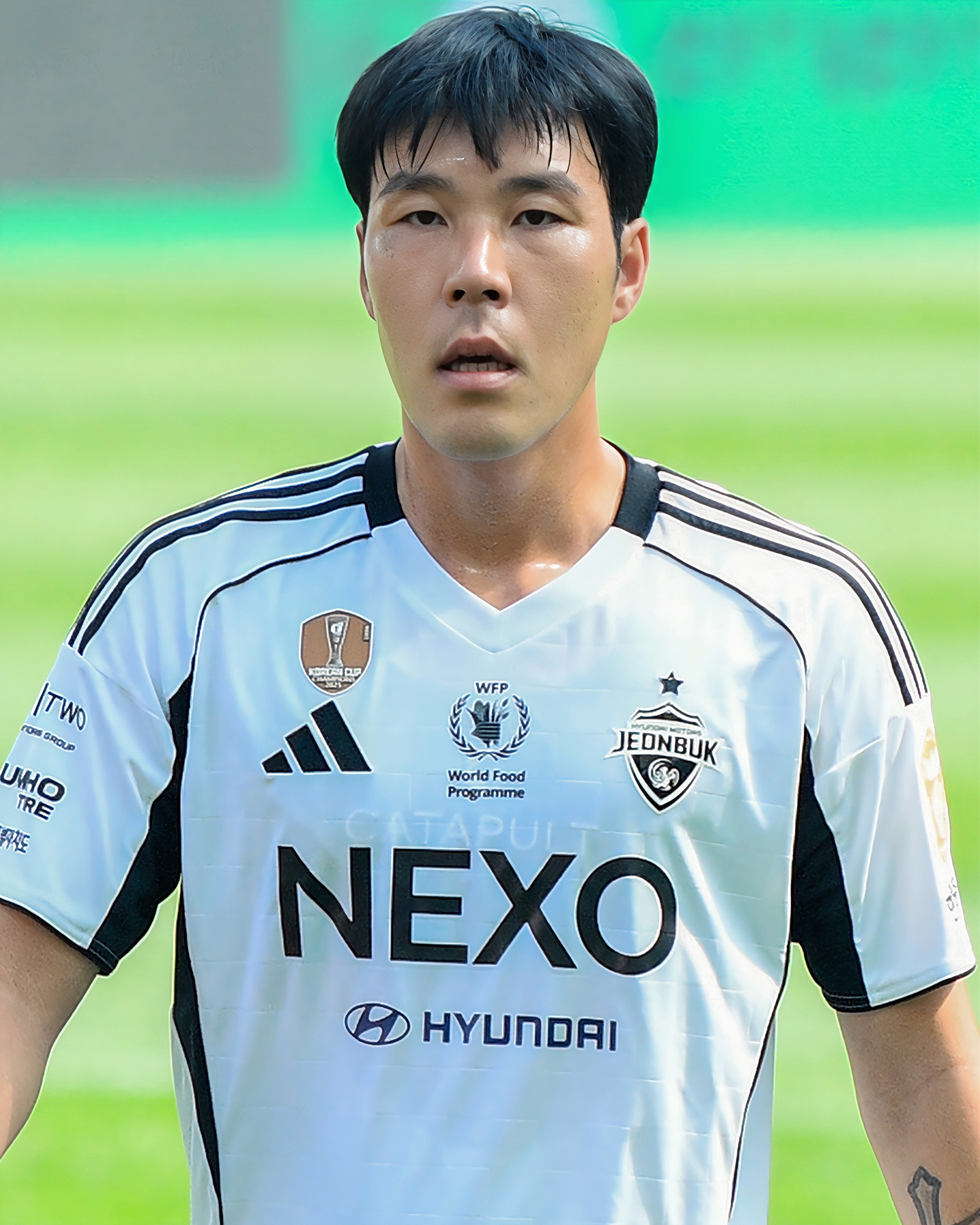
- Kim in 2026

Personal information
- Date of birth: 20 September 1991 (age 35)
- Place of birth: South Korea
- Height: 1.84 m (6 ft 1/2 in)
- Position: Centre-back

Team information
- Current team: Jeonbuk Hyundai Motors
- Number: 2

Youth career
- 2010–2013: Gwangju University

Senior career*
Years	Team	Apps	(Gls)
2014–2019	Gwangju FC	105	(5)
2018–2019	→ Sangju Sangmu (army)	41	(1)
2020–2024	Gangwon FC	158	(9)
2025–	Jeonbuk Hyundai Motors	47	(2)

International career^{‡}
2021–	South Korea	1	(0)
- * Club domestic league appearances and goals as of 3 August 2026 ‡ National team caps and goals as of 9 June 2021

Kim Young-bin (Korean: 김영빈; born 20 September 1991) is a South Korean footballer who plays as defender for Jeonbuk Hyundai Motors in K League 1.

== Club career ==
He was selected by Gwangju FC in the 2014 K League draft.

== International career ==
He made his debut for South Korea national football team on 9 June 2021 in a World Cup qualifier against Sri Lanka.

== Club career statistics ==
As of 2 January 2025

Appearances and goals by club, season and competition
Club	Season	League			Cup		Continental		Other		Total	
Club	Season	Division	Apps	Goals	Apps	Goals	Apps	Goals	Apps	Goals	Apps	Goals
Gwangju FC	2014	K League 2	24	1	2	0	—		4 (Note: Appearance in K League Promotion-Relegation play-offs)	0	30	1
Gwangju FC	2015	K League 1	28	2	1	0	—		—		29	2
Gwangju FC	2016	K League 1	27	0	0	0	—		—		27	0
Gwangju FC	2017	K League 1	23	2	1	0	—		—		24	1
Gwangju FC	2019	K League 2	3	0	—		—		—		3	0
Gwangju FC	Total		105	5	4	0	—		4	0	113	5
Sangju Sangmu (army)	2018	K League 1	18	0	1	0	—		—		19	0
Sangju Sangmu (army)	2019	K League 1	23	1	1	0	—		—		24	1
Sangju Sangmu (army)	Total		41	1	2	0	—		—		43	1
Gangwon FC	2020	K League 1	26	1	1	0	—		—		27	1
Gangwon FC	2021	K League 1	33	3	2	0	—		2	0	37	3
Gangwon FC	2022	K League 1	36	4	2	0	—		—		38	4
Gangwon FC	2023	K League 1	38	0	2	0	—		2	0	42	0
Gangwon FC	2024	K League 1	25	1	1	0	—		—		26	1
Gangwon FC	Total		158	9	8	0	—		4	0	170	9
Jeonbuk Hyundai Motors	2025	K League 1					—		—			
Career total			304	15	14	0	—		8	0	326	15

== Honours ==
Gwangju FC

- K League 2: 2019

Jeonbuk Hyundai Motors

- K League 1: 2025
- Korean FA Cup: 2025
