= Kim Dae-woo (footballer) =

South Korean footballer

Personal information
- Date of birth: December 2, 2000 (age 25)
- Place of birth: South Korea
- Height: 1.79 m (5 ft 10 in)
- Position: Midfielder

Team information
- Current team: Daegu FC
- Number: 25

Youth career
- 2016–2018: Hanyang Technical High School
- 2019–2020: Soongsil University

Senior career*
Years	Team	Apps	(Gls)
2021–2025	Gangwon FC	81	(4)
2026–	Daegu FC	17	(0)

International career^{‡}
2021–	South Korea U23	0	(0)
Korean name
Hangul	김대우
Hanja	金大禹
RR	Gim Daeu
MR	Kim Taeu
- * Club domestic league appearances and goals as of 5 August 2026 ‡ National team caps and goals as of 22 February 2022

Kim Dae-woo (Korean: 김대우; born December 2, 2000) is a South Korean professional footballer who plays as a midfielder for Daegu FC of the K League 2.

== Career statistics ==
=== Club ===
As of 22 February 2022.

Club	Season	League			Cup		Other		Total	
Club	Season	Division	Apps	Goals	Apps	Goals	Apps	Goals	Apps	Goals
Gangwon FC	2021	K League 1	21	2	2	0	2	0	25	2
Gangwon FC	2022	K League 1	1	0	0	0	—		1	0
Gangwon FC	Total		22	2	2	0	2	0	26	2
Career total			22	2	2	0	2	0	26	2
