= Yang Min-hyeok =

South Korean footballer (born 2006)

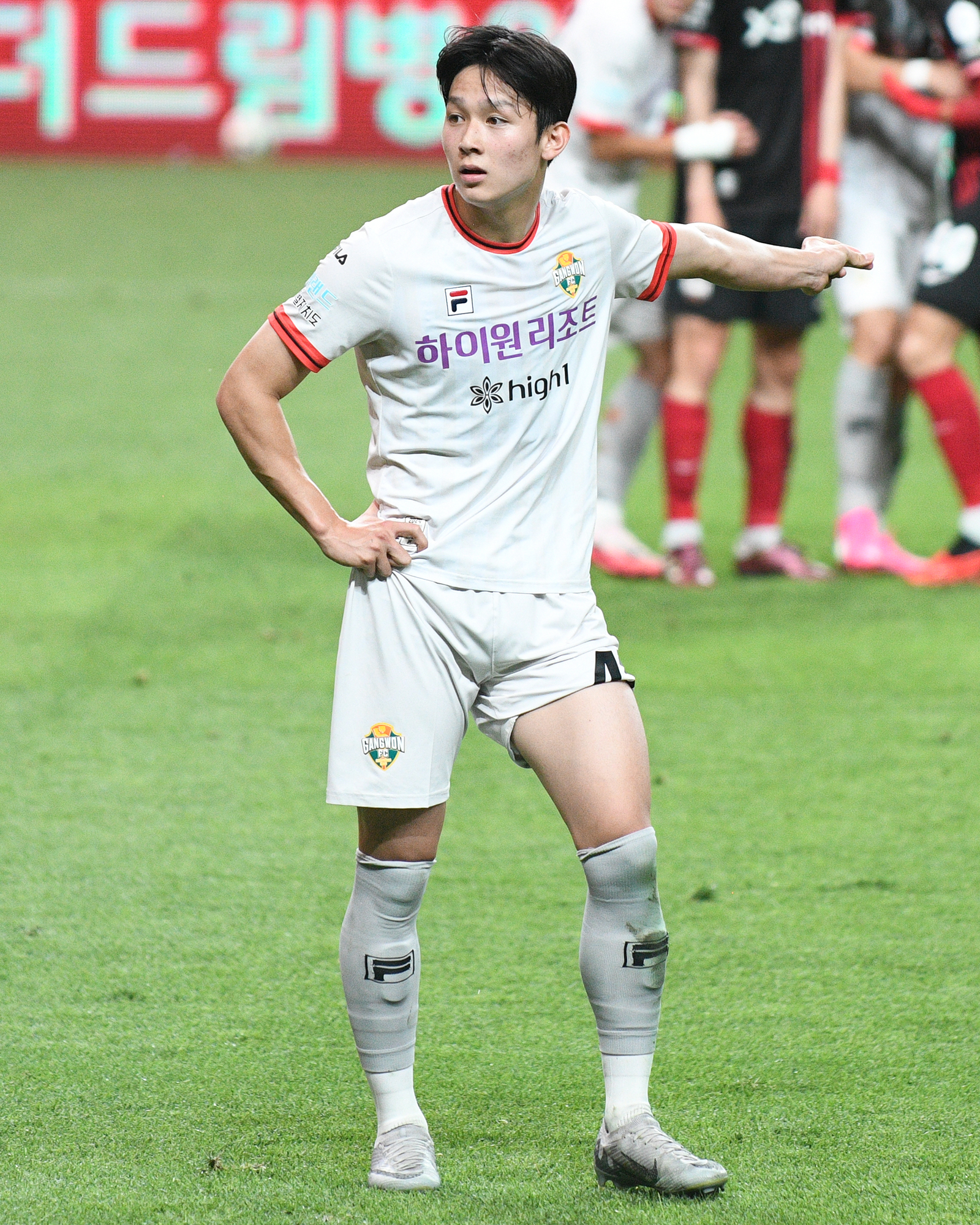
- Yang with Gangwon FC in 2024

Personal information
- Date of birth: 16 April 2006 (age 20)
- Place of birth: Gwangju, Gyeonggi, South Korea
- Height: 1.76 m (5 ft 9 in)
- Position: Winger

Team information
- Current team: Westerlo (on loan from Tottenham Hotspur)
- Number: 47

Youth career
- 2022–2023: Gangwon FC (Note: Played for Gangneung Jeil High School, which was an academy of Gangwon FC.)

Senior career*
Years	Team	Apps	(Gls)
2024	Gangwon FC	38	(12)
2025–	Tottenham Hotspur	0	(0)
2025	→ Queens Park Rangers (loan)	14	(2)
2025–2026	→ Portsmouth (loan)	15	(3)
2026	→ Coventry City (loan)	3	(0)
2026–	→ Westerlo (loan)	6	(1)

International career^{‡}
2022–2023	South Korea U17	23	(2)
2025–	South Korea U23	8	(0)
2025–	South Korea	2	(0)
Medal record
Men's football
Representing South Korea
Asian Games
Gold medal – first place	2026 Aichi–Nagoya
AFC U-17 Asian Cup
Runner-up	2023 Thailand
- * Club domestic league appearances and goals as of 8 November 2026 ‡ National team caps and goals as of 3 October 2026

Yang Min-hyeok (Korean: 양민혁; born 16 April 2006) is a South Korean footballer who plays as a winger for Belgian Pro League club Westerlo, on loan from Premier League club Tottenham Hotspur, and the South Korea national team.

== Club career ==
=== Gangwon FC ===
In 2022, Yang joined Gangneung Jeil High School and started to play for the school's football club, an academy of Gangwon FC. Prior to the 2024 season, when he was just one year away from graduating, he was promoted to the senior team. He won the K League Player of the Month award for July 2024, becoming the youngest player to win the award. He was on the list of three nominees for the K League 1 Most Valuable Player award after leading Gangwon to second place. The MVP award was given to league champion Jo Hyeon-woo, but he received the Young Player of the Year award.

=== Tottenham Hotspur ===
Yang signed a six-year contract with Tottenham Hotspur on 28 July 2024, to join the club in January 2025, allowing him to complete the 2024 K League 1 season with Gangwon. He spent part of December 2024 at the club's training ground, learning English.

==== 2024–25: Loan to Queens Park Rangers ====
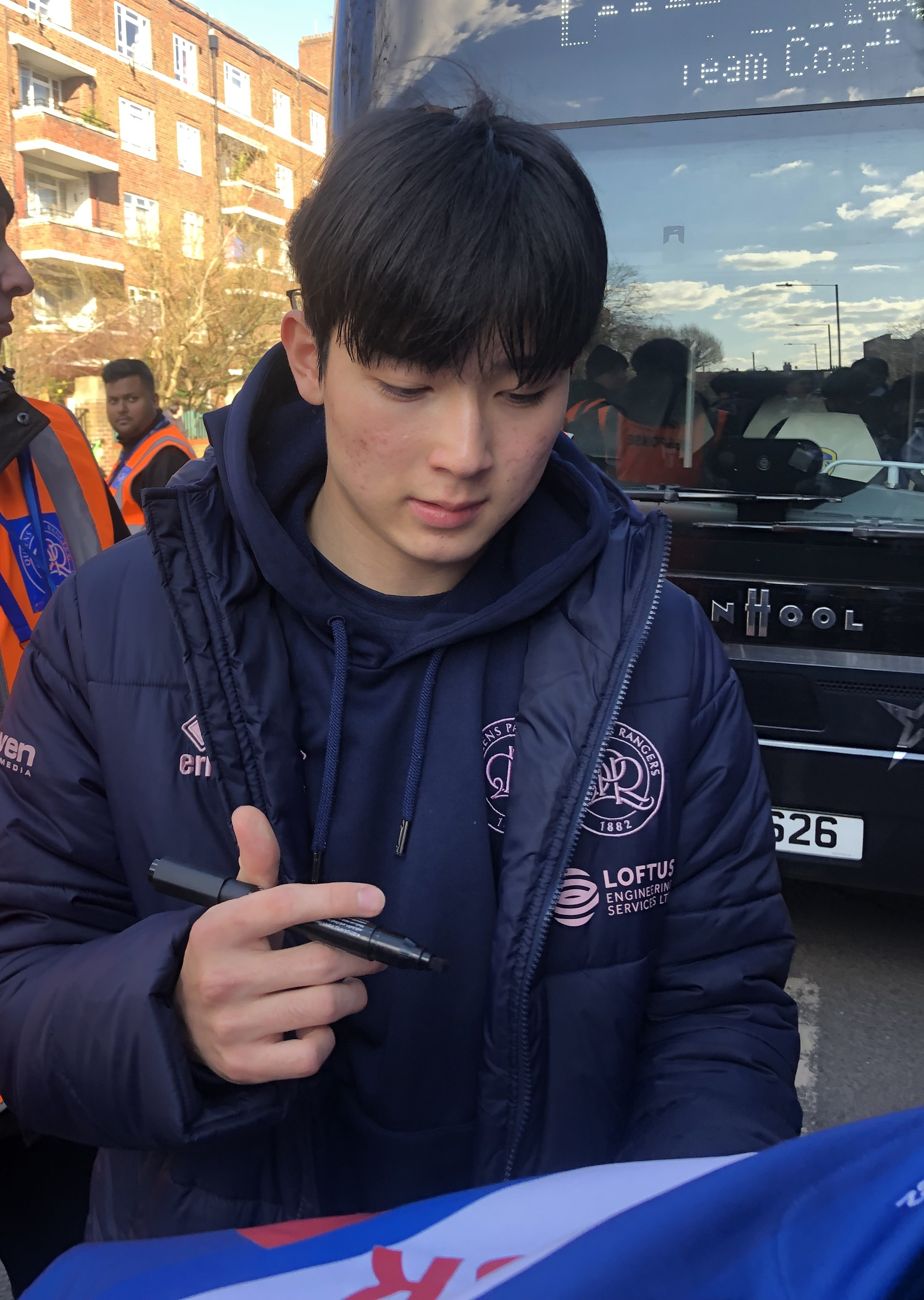
Yang with Queens Park Rangers signing autographs in March 2025

On 29 January 2025, Yang joined EFL Championship side Queens Park Rangers on loan for the remainder of the season. On 1 February, he made his Championship debut as a substitute in a 2–1 loss to Millwall. On 14 February, he provided his first Championship assist in a 4–0 win over Derby County, where he made his first start. On 29 March, he scored his first Championship goal in a 3–1 loss to Stoke City.

==== 2025–26: Loan to Portsmouth and Coventry ====
On 8 August 2025, Yang joined fellow Championship club Portsmouth on a season-long loan deal. On 1 October, he scored his first goal for the club in a 2–2 draw with Watford. On 29 December, Yang would be introduced off the bench in the 64th minute in a match against Charlton Athletic. He would go on to score a 98th-minute goal to win the game 2–1, helping Portsmouth beat Charlton Athletic at Fratton Park for the first time since April 2005.

On 6 January 2026, Yang was recalled by Tottenham Hotspur, then loaned out to Championship side Coventry City for the remainder of the season. He left Portsmouth to get more appearances, but it was hard to see him at Coventry, who were in the title race. He played only 29 minutes for Coventry until they secured the league title.

== International career ==
In 2023, Yang played for the South Korea under-17 team at the AFC U-17 Asian Cup and the FIFA U-17 World Cup. On 25 March 2025, Yang made his senior international debut during the second half of a FIFA World Cup qualifier against Jordan.

=== 2026 Asian Games and controversy ===
Yang was selected for South Korea under-23s for the 2026 Asian Games. He was criticised for being uninfluential in the first three matches by the press, and took a rest on the bench during the 2–1 semi-final win over China. But he supplied a decisive cross converted into the only goal by Eom Ji-sung in the final against Japan, and then received an exemption from compulsory military service as Asian Games gold medalist's special benefit.

In an interview just after the final win, however, Yang said the medal or trophy was really not important and he had set his sights on military exemption. His remark, which could be interpreted that he put individual benefit above responsibility as a national team player, caused public outrage in South Korea. When apologizing through his Instagram the next day, he reversed his remark and intention, and said he would repay in the stadium. Afterwards, South Korea's National Assembly started to discuss about the abolition of Asian Games gold medalists' exemption from military service.

== Career statistics ==
=== Club ===
As of 8 November 2026

Appearances and goals by club, season and competition
Club	Season	League			National cup (Note: Includes FA Cup, Belgian Cup)		League cup (Note: Includes EFL Cup)		Continental		Other		Total	
Club	Season	Division	Apps	Goals	Apps	Goals	Apps	Goals	Apps	Goals	Apps	Goals	Apps	Goals
Gangwon FC	2024	K League 1	38	12	0	0	—		—		—		38	12
Tottenham Hotspur	2024–25	Premier League	0	0	0	0	0	0	0	0	—		0	0
Queens Park Rangers (loan)	2024–25	Championship	14	2	—		—		—		—		14	2
Portsmouth (loan)	2025–26	Championship	15	3	—		1	0	—		—		16	3
Coventry City (loan)	2025–26	Championship	3	0	1	0	—		—		—		4	0
Westerlo (loan)	2026–27	Belgian Pro League	6	1	1	0	—		—		—		7	1
Career total			76	18	2	0	1	0	0	0	—		79	18

== Honours ==
South Korea U17

- AFC U-17 Asian Cup runner-up: 2023

South Korea U23

- Asian Games: 2026

Coventry City

- EFL Championship: 2025–26

Individual

- K League Young Player of the Month: April 2024, May 2024, June 2024, July 2024, October 2024
- K League All-Star: 2024
- K League Player of the Month: July 2024
- K League Goal of the Month: July 2024
- K League 1 Young Player of the Year: 2024
- K League 1 Best XI: 2024
- Korean FA Young Player of the Year: 2024
