= Henry Offia =

Nigerian footballer

Okechukwu Offia
Personal information
- Full name: Okechukwu Henry Offia
- Date of birth: 26 December 1999 (age 26)
- Place of birth: Lagos, Nigeria
- Height: 1.71 m (5 ft 7 in)
- Positions: Winger; forward

Youth career
- Dynamos Academy

Senior career*
Years	Team	Apps	(Gls)
2018–2019	Sirius	12	(1)
2018	→ Sollentuna FK (loan)	15	(1)
2020	Dalkurd FF	23	(2)
2021–2023	Trelleborgs FF	90	(24)
2024–2025	Västerås SK	17	(3)

International career
2019	Nigeria U20	3	(1)
- * Club domestic league appearances and goals as of 13 November 2024

Okechukwu Henry Offia (born 26 December 1999) is a Nigerian footballer who plays as a winger or forward.

== Career ==
Offia caught the eye of IK Sirius of Sweden in an exhibition match in Lagos and joined the club in January 2018 and was immediately loaned out to Sollentuna FK. On 23 March 2020, Offia joined Dalkurd FF.

In February 2021, Offia joined Trelleborgs FF on a deal until the end of 2023.

After the expiry of his contract at Trelleborg in November 2023, Offia joined newly-promoted Allsvenskan club Västerås SK. On 25 March 2025, Västerås confirmed that Offia's contract had been terminated by mutual agreement.
