= Dominik Steczyk =

Polish footballer

Personal information
- Full name: Dominik Patryk Steczyk
- Date of birth: 4 May 1999 (age 27)
- Place of birth: Katowice, Poland
- Height: 1.85 m (6 ft 1 in)
- Position: Forward

Youth career
- KS Śląski Chorzów
- UKS Żaczek Katowice
- 2011–2012: Ruch Chorzów
- 2013–2015: GKS Katowice
- 2015–2018: VfL Bochum

Senior career*
Years	Team	Apps	(Gls)
2018–2021	FC Nürnberg II	22	(10)
2019–2021	→ Piast Gliwice (loan)	41	(4)
2021–2022	Piast Gliwice	15	(0)
2022	→ Stal Mielec (loan)	11	(1)
2022–2023	Hallescher FC	33	(5)
2023–2024	Ruch Chorzów	13	(0)
2024	Preußen Münster	14	(1)
2024–2026	SC Verl	46	(11)
2026	Académico de Viseu	14	(0)

International career
2016	Poland U17	1	(0)
2016	Poland U18	3	(0)
2017	Poland U19	7	(1)
2018–2019	Poland U20	12	(4)
- * Club domestic league appearances and goals as of 20:27, 6 September 2026 (UTC)

Dominik Patryk Steczyk (born 4 May 1999) is a Polish professional footballer who plays as a forward.

== Club career ==
On 26 January 2024, Steczyk signed with Preußen Münster in German 3. Liga.

On 17 June 2024, he joined fellow 3. Liga club SC Verl.

On 20 January 2026, Steczyk joined Liga Portugal 2 club Académico de Viseu on a contract until June 2027. He terminated his contract by mutual consent on 6 September 2026.
