= Yūta Kamiya =

Japanese footballer (born 1997)

Yūta Kamiya 神谷 優太
Personal information
- Full name: Yūta Kamiya
- Date of birth: 24 April 1997 (age 29)
- Place of birth: Yamagata, Japan
- Height: 1.74 m (5 ft 9 in)
- Positions: Attacking midfielder; winger

Team information
- Current team: Fagiano Okayama
- Number: 33

Youth career
- 2004–2006: OSA Fortuna Yamagata
- 2007–2008: SFC Giurare
- 2009–2013: Tokyo Verdy
- 2014–2015: Aomori Yamada High School

Senior career*
Years	Team	Apps	(Gls)
2016–2019	Shonan Bellmare	21	(0)
2018–2019	→ Ehime FC (loan)	66	(13)
2020–2021	Kashiwa Reysol	44	(6)
2022–2023	Shimizu S-Pulse	44	(4)
2024	Gangwon FC	10	(0)
2024–	Fagiano Okayama	61	(2)

International career
2016	Japan U-19	2	(0)
2018	Japan U-21		
2017–2019	Japan U-23	8	(1)
Medal record
Representing Japan
Asian Games
Silver medal – second place	2018 Jakarta-Palembang	Team
AFC U-19 Championship
Gold medal – first place	2016 Bahrain
- * Club domestic league appearances and goals as of 12 August 2026

Yūta Kamiya (神谷 優太, Kamiya Yūta; born 24 April 1997) is a Japanese professional footballer who plays as an attacking midfielder or a winger for J1 League club Fagiano Okayama.

== Early life ==
In 2014, Kamiya joined Aomori Yamada High School. During his third year of high school, he played in the All Japan High School Soccer Championship, losing in the semi-finals to Kokugakuin Kugayama High School. Shonan Bellmare offered him a contract after the tournament.

== Career ==
On 19 December 2017, Kamiya joined Ehime FC on a one year loan deal.

On 25 December 2019, Kamiya was announced at Kashiwa Reysol.

On 22 December 2021, Kamiya was announced at Shimizu S-Pulse. He made his league debut against Consadole Sapporo on 19 February 2022. Kamiya scored his first league goal against Yokohama F. Marinos on 2 July 2022, scoring in the 14th minute. On 6 December 2023, the club announced they would not be renewing his contract for the 2024 season.

On 24 December 2023, Kamiya was announced at Gangwon FC. He made his league debut against Jeju SK FC on 2 March 2024.

On 21 July 2024, Kamiya was announced at Fagiano Okayama. He made his league debut against Montedio Yamagata on 3 August 2024. Kamiya scored his first league goal against Ehime FC on 14 September 2024, scoring in the 82nd minute.

== International career ==
Kamiya was called up to the Japan U19 squad for the 2016 AFC U-19 Championship.

Kamiya was called up to the Japan squad for the 2018 Asian Games.

== Club statistics ==
As of match played 6 December 2024.

Appearances and goals by club, season and competition
Club	Season	League			National cup		League cup		Other		Total	
Club	Season	Division	Apps	Goals	Apps	Goals	Apps	Goals	Apps	Goals	Apps	Goals
Shonan Bellmare	2016	J1 League	14	0	1	0	4	0	—		19	0
Shonan Bellmare	2017	J2 League	7	0	2	0	—		—		9	0
Shonan Bellmare	Total		21	0	3	0	4	0	—		28	0
Ehime FC (loan)	2018	J2 League	30	7	0	0	—		—		30	7
Ehime FC (loan)	2019	J2 League	36	6	0	0	—		—		36	6
Ehime FC (loan)	Total		66	13	0	0	—		—		66	13
Kashiwa Reysol	2020	J1 League	19	3	0	0	2	0	—		21	3
Kashiwa Reysol	2021	J1 League	25	3	1	0	3	0	—		29	3
Kashiwa Reysol	Total		44	6	1	0	5	0	—		50	6
Shimizu S-Pulse	2022	J1 League	21	1	2	0	6	1	—		29	2
Shimizu S-Pulse	2023	J2 League	22	3	0	0	2	0	1	0	25	3
Shimizu S-Pulse	Total		43	4	2	0	8	1	1	0	54	5
Gangwon FC	2024	K League 1	10	0	2	1	—		—		12	1
Fagiano Okayama	2024	J2 League	13	1	—		—		2	0	15	1
Career total			197	24	8	1	17	1	3	0	225	26
