= Kim Woo-seok (footballer) =

South Korean footballer

Personal information
- Full name: Kim Woo-seok
- Date of birth: 4 August 1996 (age 30)
- Place of birth: Ulsan, South Korea
- Height: 1.87 m (6 ft 2 in)
- Position: Defender

Team information
- Current team: Dangjin Citizen FC
- Number: 26

Youth career
- 2013–2015: Shingal High School

Senior career*
Years	Team	Apps	(Gls)
2016–2022	Daegu FC	114	(2)
2023–2024	Gangwon FC	17	(0)
2025–	Dangjin Citizen FC	0	(0)

International career^{‡}
2018	South Korea U-23	0	(0)
- * Club domestic league appearances and goals as of October 29, 2022 ‡ National team caps and goals as of March 13, 2018

- Kim Woo-seok
- Hangul: 김우석
- Hanja: 金宇碩
- RR: Gim Useok
- MR: Kim Usŏk

Kim Woo-seok (Korean: 김우석; born 4 August 1996) is a South Korean football defender who plays for Dangjin Citizen FC and former South Korea national under-23 football team.

== Club career ==
Kim joined Daegu FC in 2016, and made his debut for the club on 28 May 2017, playing against Sangju Sangmu.

From 2023 season, Kim joined Gangwon FC and after two seasons in Gangwon, he moved to Dangjin Citizen FC.

== Club career statistics ==
As of 10 February 2025

Club performance			League		Cup		Continental		Total	
Club	Season	League	Apps	Goals	Apps	Goals	Apps	Goals	Apps	Goals
South Korea			League		KFA Cup		Asia		Total	
Daegu FC	2016	K League 2	0	0	0	0	-		0	0
Daegu FC	2017	K League 1	12	1	0	0	-		12	1
Daegu FC	2018	K League 1	20	0	4	0	-		24	0
Daegu FC	2019	K League 1	35	1	1	0	6	0	42	0
Daegu FC	2020	K League 1	25	0	0	0	-		25	0
Daegu FC	2021	K League 1	12	0	1	0	1	0	13	0
Daegu FC	2022	K League 1	10	0	1	0	1	0	12	0
Daegu FC	Total		114	2	7	0	8	0	129	2
Gangwon FC	2023	K League 1	13	0	2	0	—		15	0
Gangwon FC	2024	K League 1	4	0	1	0	—		5	0
Gangwon FC	Total		17	0	3	0	—		20	0
Dangjin Citizen	2025	K4 League					—			
Career total			131	2	10	0	8	0	149	2

== Honors and awards ==
=== Player ===
Daegu FC

- Korean FA Cup Winners (1) : 2018
