= 2019 U-20 Africa Cup of Nations squads =

The 2019 Africa U-20 Cup of Nations is an international association football tournament held in Niger. The eight national teams involved in the tournament were required to register a squad of 21 players; only players in these squads are eligible to take part in the tournament. Each player had to have been born after 1 January 1999. All ages as of start of the tournament. The squads for the 2019 Africa U-20 Cup of Nations were announced on 30 January 2019.

Players marked in bold have been capped at full International level.

== Group A ==
=== Burundi ===
Head coach: Joslin Bipfubusa

No.	Pos.	Player	Date of birth (age)	Club
1	GK	Ally Kitenge	12 October 2000 (aged 18)	(Burundi) Bujumbura City
2	DF	**Chancel Ndaye**	14 April 1999 (aged 19)	(Burundi) Rukinzo FC
3	DF	Steve Nahimana	1 March 1999 (aged 19)	(Burundi) Kayanza United
4	FW	**Mohamed Amissi**	3 August 2000 (aged 18)	(Netherlands) NAC Breda
5	FW	Pascal Ramazani	3 August 2000 (aged 18)	(Burundi) Musongati FC
6	MF	**Eric Mbirizi**	20 April 1998 (aged 20)	(Tanzania) Stand United F.C.
7	FW	Jules Ulimwengu	21 April 1999 (aged 19)	(Rwanda) Sunrise FC
8	MF	Thérence Rukundo	12 March 1999 (aged 19)	(Burundi) Kayanza United
9	FW	Cedric Mavugo	10 October 1999 (aged 19)	(Burundi) Aigle Noir
10	MF	Muryango Mabano	15 December 1999 (aged 19)	(Burundi) Aigle Noir
11	DF	Ramadhan Bigirimana	20 December 1999 (aged 19)	(Tanzania) Stand United F.C.
13	FW	Saidi Irakoze	24 October 2000 (aged 18)	(Burundi) Musongati FC
14	MF	**Jospin Nshimirimana**	12 December 2001 (aged 17)	(Burundi) Aigle Noir
15	DF	Selemani Moustafa	6 September 1999 (aged 19)	(Burundi) Aigle Noir
16	MF	Abdul Karim Barandondera	20 October 2000 (aged 18)	(Burundi) Flambeau du Centre
17	MF	Armel Eza	12 November 2000 (aged 18)	(Burundi) Kayanza United
18	GK	Aimé Ndizeye	2 February 2002 (aged 16)	(Burundi) Aigle Noir
19	FW	**Bienvenue Kanakimana**	28 December 1999 (aged 19)	(Burundi) Aigle Noir
20	GK	Onésime Rukundo	9 April 1999 (aged 19)	(Burundi) Le Messager Ngozi
21	DF	Eric Ndoriyobija	17 May 1999 (aged 19)	(Tanzania) Stand United F.C.

=== Niger ===
Head coach: Ismaïla Tiemoko

No.	Pos.	Player	Date of birth (age)	Club
1	GK	Abdoul Kahar Issoufou	7 September 1999 (aged 19)	(Niger) AS Police
2	MF	Yacine Wa Massamba	9 March 2000 (aged 18)	(Niger) ASN Nigelec
3	DF	Ismael Issaka	18 July 2000 (aged 18)	(Niger) AS Police
4	DF	Nasser Mahaman	24 September 2000 (aged 18)	(Niger) Jangorzo FC
5	MF	**Abdoul Moumouni**	7 August 2002 (aged 16)	(Niger) US GN
6	MF	**Issah Salou**	4 February 1999 (aged 19)	(Ghana) Sporting Club
7	MF	Abdoul Kader Aboubacar	31 December 2000 (aged 18)	(Niger) Urana FC
8	MF	**Amadou Sabo**	30 May 2000 (aged 18)	(Niger) AS SONIDEP
9	FW	**Kairou Amoustapha**	1 January 2001 (aged 18)	(Niger) ASN Nigelec
10	MF	Rachid Alfari	30 December 2000 (aged 18)	(Niger) AS FAN
11	FW	Abdoul Malik Moustapha	12 November 2001 (aged 17)	(Niger) Racing FC
12	DF	Djibrilla Ibrahim	2 March 2002 (aged 16)	(Ghana) Cheetah FC
13	DF	Maman Bachir Moussa	8 August 2000 (aged 18)	(Niger) AS Douanes
14	DF	Inoussa Amadou	5 September 2000 (aged 18)	(Niger) AS SONIDEP
15	FW	Seyni Koudou	1 January 2000 (aged 19)	(Niger) AS Zam
16	GK	Abdoulaye Boubacar	1 January 2001 (aged 18)	(Niger) AS FAN
17	FW	**Ibrahim Marou**	1 January 2000 (aged 19)	(Slovenia) ND Ilirija 1911
18	DF	Ibrahim Namata	10 May 2000 (aged 18)	(Niger) Sahel SC
19	MF	Boubacar Goumey	14 July 2000 (aged 18)	(Niger) ASN Nigelec
20	DF	Djabiri Ibrahim	10 October 1999 (aged 19)	(Niger) Urana FC
21	GK	Khaled Lawali	15 July 2000 (aged 18)	(Niger) Sahel SC

=== Nigeria ===
Head coach: Paul Aigbogun

No.	Pos.	Player	Date of birth (age)	Club
1	GK	Akpan Udoh	18 July 1999 (aged 19)	(Nigeria) Remo Academy
2	DF	Mike Zaruma	16 April 2002 (aged 16)	(Nigeria) Plateau United F.C.
3	DF	**Ikouwem Udo**	11 November 1999 (aged 19)	(Nigeria) Enyimba International F.C.
4	MF	Peter Etim Eletu	24 January 2000 (aged 19)	(Nigeria) Prince Kazeem Football Academy
5	DF	Aliyu Olasunkanmi	28 September 1999 (aged 19)	(Nigeria) Emmanuel Amunike Soccer Academy
6	DF	**Valentine Ozornwafor**	1 June 1999 (aged 19)	(Nigeria) Enyimba International F.C.
7	MF	Quadri Liameed	8 April 2002 (aged 16)	(Nigeria) 36 Lions FC
8	FW	Ibrahim Alhassan	14 October 2000 (aged 18)	(Nigeria) Kano Pillars F.C.
9	FW	Nazifi Yahaya	16 December 2000 (aged 18)	(Denmark) SønderjyskE
10	MF	Aniekeme Okon	8 May 1999 (aged 19)	(Nigeria) Akwa United F.C.
11	FW	Ibrahim Aliyu	16 January 2002 (aged 17)	(Nigeria) Oasis FC
12	DF	Igoh Ogbu	8 February 2000 (aged 18)	(Norway) Rosenborg BK
13	DF	Ogberahwe Solomon Onome	16 May 1999 (aged 19)	(Nigeria) El-Kanemi Warriors F.C.
14	MF	Adeshina Gata	8 February 1999 (aged 19)	(Nigeria) Wikki Tourists F.C.
15	MF	Jamil Muhammad	12 November 2000 (aged 18)	(Nigeria) Kano Pillars F.C.
16	GK	Olawale Oremade	31 December 1999 (aged 19)	(Nigeria) Oasis FC
17	MF	Abubakar Ibrahim	24 January 2000 (aged 19)	(Nigeria) Plateau United F.C.
18	FW	Paschal Durugbor	22 November 1999 (aged 19)	(Sweden) Växjö United FC
19	MF	Maxwell Michael Effiom	5 November 1999 (aged 19)	(Nigeria) Enyimba International F.C.
20	MF	**Afeez Aremu**	3 October 1999 (aged 19)	(Norway) IK Start
21	GK	Detan Ogundare	8 December 2000 (aged 18)	(Nigeria) Kogi United F.C.

=== South Africa ===
Head coach: Thabo Senong

No.	Pos.	Player	Date of birth (age)	Club
1	GK	Kopano Thuntsane	30 October 1999 (aged 19)	(South Africa) Orlando Pirates
2	DF	Keenan Abrahams	27 May 1999 (aged 19)	(South Africa) Ajax Cape Town
3	DF	Givemore Khupe	20 December 1999 (aged 19)	(South Africa) Cape Umoya United
4	FW	Malebogo Modise	6 February 1999 (aged 19)	(South Africa) M Tigers
5	DF	**Sbusiso Mabiliso**	14 April 1999 (aged 19)	(South Africa) AmaZulu
6	DF	Fezile Gcaba	3 March 1999 (aged 19)	(South Africa) Pele Pele
7	FW	Promise Mkhuma	24 May 2000 (aged 18)	(South Africa) Mamelodi Sundowns
8	DF	**Njabulo Blom**	11 December 1999 (aged 19)	(South Africa) Kaizer Chiefs
9	FW	Bayanda Shangase	25 November 1999 (aged 19)	(South Africa) AmaZulu
10	MF	Thakgalo Leshabela	19 September 1999 (aged 19)	(England) Leicester City
11	MF	Nkosingiphile Ngcobo	16 November 1999 (aged 19)	(South Africa) Kaizer Chiefs
12	FW	Thabiso Monyane	30 April 2000 (aged 18)	(South Africa) Orlando Pirates
13	DF	Keenan Phillips	7 February 2000 (aged 18)	(South Africa) Bidvest Wits
14	MF	**Luke Le Roux**	10 March 2000 (aged 18)	(South Africa) SuperSport United
15	MF	Siphesihle Mkhize	5 February 1999 (aged 19)	(South Africa) M Tigers
16	GK	Glen Baadjies	27 March 2000 (aged 18)	(South Africa) Mamelodi Sundowns
17	MF	**Luvuyo Phewa**	8 November 1999 (aged 19)	(South Africa) Real Kings
18	DF	Thabo Moloisane	24 February 1999 (aged 19)	(South Africa) Mamelodi Sundowns
19	MF	Kobamelo Kodisang	28 August 1999 (aged 19)	(South Africa) Mamelodi Sundowns
20	GK	Walter Kubheka	7 January 1999 (aged 20)	(South Africa) Cape Umoya United
21	MF	Simphiwe Ncamani	18 February 1999 (aged 19)	(South Africa) TS Sporting

== Group B ==
=== Burkina Faso ===
Head coach: Séraphin Dargani

No.	Pos.	Player	Date of birth (age)	Club
1	GK	Mohamed Zegue Traoré	31 December 1999 (aged 19)	(Burkina Faso) IFFA
2	DF	**Issa Kaboré**	12 May 2001 (aged 17)	(Burkina Faso) Rahimo FC
3	DF	Pierre Kaboré	5 July 2001 (aged 17)	(Burkina Faso) ASF Bobo Dioulasso
4	DF	Abdoul Karim Komi	26 March 2002 (aged 16)	(Burkina Faso) Rahimo FC
5	DF	Sekou Tall	12 April 1999 (aged 19)	(Burkina Faso) US Ouagadougou
6	MF	**Ibrahim Bancé**	15 January 2001 (aged 18)	(Ivory Coast) ASEC Mimosas
7	FW	**Kouamé Botué**	7 August 2002 (aged 16)	(Burkina Faso) USFA
8	MF	Yaël Tiendrébéogo	25 April 2001 (aged 17)	(France) AS Nancy Lorraine
9	FW	**Abdoul Tapsoba**	23 August 2001 (aged 17)	(Ivory Coast) ASEC Mimosas
10	MF	Salifou Diarrassouba	20 December 2001 (aged 17)	(Ivory Coast) ASEC Mimosas
11	FW	**Djibril Ouattara**	19 September 1999 (aged 19)	(Morocco) RS Berkane
12	DF	Issiaka Ouédraogo	10 June 2000 (aged 18)	(Burkina Faso) AS Police
13	GK	Ibrahim Sare	31 December 2000 (aged 18)	(Burkina Faso) ASFA Yennenga
14	MF	Kalifa Nikiema	31 December 2000 (aged 18)	(Burkina Faso) Salitas FC
15	DF	Gilbert Koné	31 December 2000 (aged 18)	(Burkina Faso) IFFA
16	GK	Abib Tapsoba	1 January 2000 (aged 19)	(Burkina Faso) AS Douanes
17	FW	Hugo Passega	20 September 2000 (aged 18)	(France) FCO Firminy
18	MF	Ghislain Nikiéma	11 October 2002 (aged 16)	(Burkina Faso) Faf
19	FW	Elliass Dianda	8 August 2000 (aged 18)	(Burkina Faso) Salitas FC
20	FW	Moubarack Compaoré	24 September 2002 (aged 16)	(Burkina Faso) KFC
21	MF	Virgile Seydou Marquis	14 June 1999 (aged 19)	(Belgium) KFCO Beerschot Wilrijk

=== Ghana ===
Head coach: Jimmy Cobblah

No.	Pos.	Player	Date of birth (age)	Club
1	GK	**Ibrahim Danlad**	2 December 2002 (aged 16)	(Ghana) Asante Kotoko
2	DF	Nathaniel Adjei	21 August 2002 (aged 16)	(Ghana) Danbort FC
3	DF	Fard Ibrahim	7 January 2000 (aged 19)	(Denmark) Vejle Boldklub
4	DF	Maxwell Arthur	4 December 2000 (aged 18)	(Ghana) Dreams FC
5	MF	Sabit Abdulai	11 May 1999 (aged 19)	(Spain) Extremadura UD
6	MF	Ibrahim Sulley	6 July 2001 (aged 17)	(Ghana) Rising Star
7	MF	Emmanuel Kumah	9 February 2000 (aged 18)	(Ghana) Tudu Mighty Jets FC
8	MF	Prosper Ahiabu	10 May 1999 (aged 19)	(Ghana) WAFA
9	FW	Basit Abdul Rahman Umar	21 December 1999 (aged 19)	(Ghana) New Edubiase United
10	MF	**Mohammed Kudus**	2 August 2000 (aged 18)	(Denmark) FC Nordsjælland
11	FW	Ibrahim Sadiq	7 May 2000 (aged 18)	(Denmark) FC Nordsjælland
12	DF	Montari Kamaheni	1 February 2000 (aged 19)	(Ghana) Dreams FC
13	DF	Michael Baidoo	14 May 1999 (aged 19)	(Denmark) FC Midtjylland
14	FW	Frank Arhin	18 February 1999 (aged 19)	(Sweden) Östersunds FK
15	DF	Ishaku Konda	11 September 1999 (aged 19)	(Austria) LASK Linz
16	GK	**Abdul Manaf Nurudeen**	8 February 1999 (aged 19)	(Belgium) K.A.S. Eupen
17	FW	Enoch Atta Agyei	5 January 1999 (aged 20)	(Tanzania) Azam F.C.
18	MF	Daniel Lomotey	16 August 1999 (aged 19)	(Ghana) WAFA
19	FW	Saliw Babawo	2 March 1999 (aged 19)	(Belarus) FC Dynamo Brest
20	DF	Gideon Mensah	9 October 2000 (aged 18)	(Denmark) FC Nordsjælland
21	GK	Fredrick Asare	28 May 1999 (aged 19)	(Ghana) Accra Lions FC

=== Mali ===
Head coach: Mamoutou Kané

No.	Pos.	Player	Date of birth (age)	Club
1	GK	Alkalifa Coulibaly	3 December 2001 (aged 17)	(Mali) Onze Createurs
2	DF	Amadou Dante	7 October 2000 (aged 18)	(Mali) Yeleen Olympique
3	DF	Drissa Diarra	1 May 1999 (aged 19)	(Mali) AS Bamako
4	DF	Fodé Konaté	2 December 2000 (aged 18)	(Mali) AS Bamako
5	DF	Babou Fofana	10 April 1999 (aged 19)	(Mali) Stade Malien
6	MF	Ousmane Diakite	25 July 2000 (aged 18)	(Austria) FC Red Bull Salzburg
7	MF	Hadji Dramé	10 September 2000 (aged 18)	(Mali) Yeleen Olympique
8	MF	**Mohamed Camara**	6 January 2000 (aged 19)	(Austria) FC Red Bull Salzburg
9	FW	**El Bilal Touré**	3 October 2001 (aged 17)	(Mali) Afrique Foot Élite
10	MF	Mamadou Traoré	8 February 1999 (aged 19)	(Mali) Stade Malien
11	FW	Aboubacar Konté	2 March 2001 (aged 17)	(Mali) Étoiles Du Mandé
12	FW	Amadou Diarra	8 June 1999 (aged 19)	(Spain) Cultural Leonesa
13	DF	Clément Boubacar Kanouté	1 September 1999 (aged 19)	(Mali) CS Duguwolofila
14	MF	Sambou Sissoko	29 June 2000 (aged 18)	(Mali) USFAS Bamako
15	DF	Abdoulaye Diaby	4 July 2000 (aged 18)	(Belgium) Royal Antwerp
16	GK	Youssouf Koïta	27 August 2000 (aged 18)	(Spain) Girona FC
17	MF	Mamadou Samaké	15 May 2000 (aged 18)	(Belgium) Standard de Liege
18	MF	**Boubacar Traoré**	20 August 2001 (aged 17)	(Mali) AS Bamako
19	FW	Lassana N'Diaye	3 October 2000 (aged 18)	(Russia) CSKA Moscow
20	FW	**Sékou Koïta**	28 November 1999 (aged 19)	(Austria) FC Red Bull Salzburg
21	GK	Souleymane Coulibaly	28 August 2001 (aged 17)	(Mali) Afrique Foot Élite

=== Senegal ===
Head coach: Youssouph Dabo

No.	Pos.	Player	Date of birth (age)	Club
1	GK	Cheikh Kané Sarr	21 April 2000 (aged 18)	(Spain) Gimnàstic de Tarragona
2	DF	Moussa N'Diaye	18 June 2002 (aged 16)	(Senegal) Excellence Foot
3	DF	**Formose Mendy**	2 January 2001 (aged 18)	(Senegal) A.F. Darou Salam
4	MF	Ousseynou Diagné	5 June 1999 (aged 19)	(France) Le Mans FC
5	DF	Souleymane Aw	5 April 1999 (aged 19)	(Belgium) K.A.S. Eupen
6	MF	Lamine Diack	15 November 2000 (aged 18)	(Senegal) Oslo Football Academy
7	FW	Amadou Sagna	10 June 1999 (aged 19)	(Senegal) Cayor Foot
8	DF	Moustapha Mbow	8 March 2000 (aged 18)	(France) Stade de Reims
9	MF	Moussa Sogué	23 January 2001 (aged 18)	(Senegal) US Gorée
10	MF	**Ibrahima Dramé**	6 October 2001 (aged 17)	(Senegal) Diambars FC
11	MF	**Mamadou Danfa**	6 March 2001 (aged 17)	(Senegal) Casa Sports
12	MF	Samba Diallo	5 January 2003 (aged 16)	(Senegal) A.F. Darou Salam
13	DF	Souleymane Cissé	1 January 1999 (aged 20)	(Senegal) Stade de Mbour
14	MF	Amadou Ciss	10 April 1999 (aged 19)	(Netherlands) Fortuna Sittard
15	MF	Ousseynou Niang	12 October 2001 (aged 17)	(Senegal) Diambars FC
16	GK	Dialy Kobaly N'Diaye	4 July 1999 (aged 19)	(Senegal) Cayor Foot
17	MF	**Dion Lopy**	2 February 2002 (aged 16)	(Senegal) Oslo Football Academy
18	MF	Faly Ndaw	7 August 1999 (aged 19)	(Senegal) Teungueth FC
19	FW	**Youssouph Badji**	20 December 2001 (aged 17)	(Senegal) Casa Sports
20	FW	**Amadou Dia N'Diaye**	2 January 2000 (aged 19)	(France) FC Metz
21	GK	François Djiba	23 November 2000 (aged 18)	(Senegal) Diambars FC
