= 2019 FIFA U-20 World Cup squads =

FIFA championship roster

The following is a list of all the squads of the national teams that participated in the 2019 FIFA U-20 World Cup. Each team had to name a preliminary squad of between 22 and 50 players. From the preliminary squad, the team had to name a final squad of 21 players (three of whom must be goalkeepers) by the FIFA deadline. Players in the final squad could be replaced by a player from the preliminary squad due to serious injury or illness up to 24 hours prior to kickoff of the team's first match. Players born on or after 1 January 1999 and on or before 31 December 2003 were eligible to compete in the tournament.

The nationality for each club reflects the national association (not the league) to which the club is affiliated. A flag is included for coaches that are of a different nationality than their own national team. Those marked in bold have been capped at full international level.

== Group A ==
=== Poland ===
Head coach: Jacek Magiera

The final squad was announced on 13 April.

No.	Pos.	Player	Date of birth (age)	Club
1	GK	**Radosław Majecki**	16 November 1999 (aged 19)	(Polish Football Association) Legia Warsaw
2	DF	Maik Nawrocki	7 February 2001 (aged 18)	(German Football Association) Werder Bremen
3	DF	**Tymoteusz Puchacz**	23 January 1999 (aged 20)	(Polish Football Association) GKS Katowice
4	DF	Adrian Gryszkiewicz	13 December 1999 (aged 19)	(Polish Football Association) Górnik Zabrze
5	DF	Serafin Szota	4 March 1999 (aged 20)	(Polish Football Association) Odra Opole
6	DF	**Sebastian Walukiewicz**	5 April 2000 (aged 19)	(Polish Football Association) Pogoń Szczecin
7	MF	Tomasz Makowski	19 July 1999 (aged 19)	(Polish Football Association) Lechia Gdańsk
8	MF	**Mateusz Bogusz**	22 August 2001 (aged 17)	(The Football Association) Leeds United
9	FW	Dominik Steczyk	4 May 1999 (aged 20)	(German Football Association) 1. FC Nürnberg
10	MF	David Kopacz	29 May 1999 (aged 19)	(German Football Association) VfB Stuttgart
11	DF	Jakub Bednarczyk	2 January 1999 (aged 20)	(German Football Association) St. Pauli
12	GK	Miłosz Mleczko	1 March 1999 (aged 20)	(Polish Football Association) Puszcza Niepołomice
13	MF	**Michał Skóraś**	15 February 2000 (aged 19)	(Polish Football Association) Bruk-Bet Termalica Nieciecza
14	MF	**Nicola Zalewski**	23 January 2002 (aged 17)	(Italian Football Federation) Roma
15	DF	Jan Sobociński	20 March 1999 (aged 20)	(Polish Football Association) ŁKS Łódź
16	MF	**Bartosz Slisz**	29 March 1999 (aged 20)	(Polish Football Association) Zagłębie Lubin
17	FW	Adrian Benedyczak	24 November 2000 (aged 18)	(Polish Football Association) Pogoń Szczecin
18	MF	Adrian Stanilewicz	22 February 2000 (aged 19)	(German Football Association) Bayer Leverkusen
19	MF	Adrian Łyszczarz	22 August 1999 (aged 19)	(Polish Football Association) GKS Katowice
20	MF	Marcel Zylla	14 January 2000 (aged 19)	(German Football Association) Bayern Munich
21	GK	Karol Niemczycki	5 July 1999 (aged 19)	(Royal Dutch Football Association) NAC Breda

=== Colombia ===
Head coach: Arturo Reyes

The final squad was announced on 29 April. Yéiler Góez was replaced by Andrés Perea on 15 May due to injury.

No.	Pos.	Player	Date of birth (age)	Club
1	GK	Reinaldo Fontalvo	8 January 1999 (aged 20)	(Colombian Football Federation) Barranquilla
2	DF	**Carlos Cuesta**	9 March 1999 (aged 20)	(Colombian Football Federation) Atlético Nacional
3	DF	**Andrés Reyes**	8 September 1999 (aged 19)	(Colombian Football Federation) Atlético Nacional
4	DF	Anderson Arroyo	27 September 1999 (aged 19)	(The Football Association) Liverpool
5	DF	Andrés Balanta	18 January 2000 (aged 19)	(Colombian Football Federation) Deportivo Cali
6	MF	**Andrés Perea** (Note: Capped for United States)	14 November 2000 (aged 18)	(Colombian Football Federation) Atlético Nacional
7	MF	Iván Angulo	22 March 1999 (aged 20)	(Brazilian Football Confederation) Palmeiras
8	MF	Jaime Alvarado	26 July 1999 (aged 19)	(The Football Association) Watford
9	FW	Luis Sandoval	1 June 1999 (aged 19)	(Colombian Football Federation) Barranquilla
10	FW	**Juan Camilo Hernández**	22 April 1999 (aged 20)	(Royal Spanish Football Federation) Huesca
11	FW	**Luis Sinisterra**	17 June 1999 (aged 19)	(Royal Dutch Football Association) Feyenoord
12	GK	Juan Lemus	1 January 1999 (aged 20)	(Colombian Football Federation) Llaneros
13	GK	**Kevin Mier**	18 May 2000 (aged 19)	(Colombian Football Federation) Atlético Nacional
14	DF	Juan Palma	18 July 1999 (aged 19)	(Colombian Football Federation) Once Caldas
15	MF	Gustavo Carvajal	17 June 2000 (aged 18)	(Colombian Football Federation) América de Cali
16	DF	**Brayan Vera**	15 January 1999 (aged 20)	(Colombian Football Federation) Leones
17	FW	Déiber Caicedo	25 March 2000 (aged 19)	(Colombian Football Federation) Deportivo Cali
18	MF	Andrés Amaya	25 April 2001 (aged 18)	(Colombian Football Federation) Atlético Huila
19	FW	Carlos Terán	24 September 2000 (aged 18)	(Colombian Football Federation) Envigado
20	MF	**Johan Carbonero**	20 July 1999 (aged 19)	(Colombian Football Federation) Once Caldas
21	MF	Jean Colorado	11 September 2000 (aged 18)	(Colombian Football Federation) Cortuluá

=== Tahiti ===
Head coach: Bruno Tehaamoana

The final squad was announced on 28 April.

No.	Pos.	Player	Date of birth (age)	Club
1	GK	Josselin Capel	1 July 2002 (aged 16)	(French Football Federation) Saint-Étienne
2	DF	**Samuel Liparo**	2 October 1999 (aged 19)	(French Football Federation) US Concarneau
3	DF	**Hennel Tehaamoana**	12 April 1999 (aged 20)	(Tahitian Football Federation) Dragon
4	MF	**Kavai'ei Morgant**	8 October 2001 (aged 17)	(French Football Federation) Trélissac
5	DF	**Etienne Tave**	4 May 2000 (aged 19)	(Tahitian Football Federation) Vénus
6	MF	**Terai Bremond**	16 May 2001 (aged 18)	(French Football Federation) Toulouse
7	MF	**Ramanui Amau**	9 June 2000 (aged 18)	(Tahitian Football Federation) Vénus
8	MF	**Yann Vivi**	7 June 2000 (aged 18)	(Tahitian Football Federation) Jeunes
9	FW	**Eddy Kaspard**	27 May 2001 (aged 17)	(French Football Federation) Trélissac
10	MF	**Roonui Tehau**	15 December 1999 (aged 19)	(Tahitian Football Federation) Dragon
11	DF	**Mauri Heitaa**	31 July 1999 (aged 19)	(Tahitian Football Federation) Vénus
12	MF	**Hugo Boube**	24 November 1999 (aged 19)	(Tahitian Football Federation) Jeunes
13	FW	**Kalahani Beaumert**	14 February 2000 (aged 19)	(French Football Federation) Stade Bordelais
14	FW	**Tutehau Tufariua**	31 January 2000 (aged 19)	(Tahitian Football Federation) Taiarapu
15	MF	Tehauarii Holozet	3 June 2002 (aged 16)	(Tahitian Football Federation) Tefana
16	GK	**Tevaearai Tamatai**	15 January 2001 (aged 18)	(Tahitian Football Federation) Vénus
17	MF	**Diego Araneda**	27 July 2000 (aged 18)	(Tahitian Football Federation) Central Sport
18	DF	**Tevaitini Teumere**	2 April 2003 (aged 16)	(French Football Federation) Toulouse
19	MF	**Herehaunui Ferrand**	8 August 2001 (aged 17)	(Tahitian Football Federation) Central Sport
20	MF	**Kitin Maro**	1 May 1999 (aged 20)	(Tahitian Football Federation) Vénus
21	GK	**Moana Pito**	25 January 2000 (aged 19)	(Tahitian Football Federation) Tefana

=== Senegal ===
Head coach: Youssouph Dabo

The final squad was announced on 13 May.

No.	Pos.	Player	Date of birth (age)	Club
1	GK	Cheikh Sarr	21 April 2000 (aged 19)	(Royal Spanish Football Federation) Gimnàstic Tarragona
2	DF	**Moussa N'Diaye**	18 July 2002 (aged 16)	(Senegalese Football Federation) Excellence Foot
3	DF	**Formose Mendy**	2 January 2001 (aged 18)	(Senegalese Football Federation) AF Darou Salam
4	MF	Ousseynou Diagné	5 June 1999 (aged 19)	(French Football Federation) Le Mans
5	DF	Souleymane Aw	5 April 1999 (aged 20)	(Royal Belgian Football Association) Eupen
6	DF	**Abdoulaye Ndiaye**	10 April 2002 (aged 17)	(Senegalese Football Federation) Dakar Sacré-Cœur
7	MF	Amadou Sagna	10 June 1999 (aged 19)	(Senegalese Football Federation) Cayor Foot
8	DF	Mamadou Mbow	8 March 2000 (aged 19)	(French Football Federation) Reims
9	FW	**Dia N'Diaye**	2 January 2000 (aged 19)	(French Football Federation) Metz
10	FW	**Ibrahima Dramé**	6 October 2001 (aged 17)	(Senegalese Football Federation) Diambars
11	FW	**Mamadou Danfa**	6 March 2001 (aged 18)	(Senegalese Football Federation) Casa Sports
12	DF	Alpha Diounkou	10 October 2001 (aged 17)	(The Football Association) Manchester City
13	DF	Souleymane Cissé	1 January 1999 (aged 20)	(Senegalese Football Federation) Stade de Mbour
14	FW	Ibrahima Niane	11 March 1999 (aged 20)	(French Football Federation) Metz
15	MF	Ousseynou Niang	12 October 2001 (aged 17)	(Senegalese Football Federation) Diambars
16	GK	Dialy N'Diaye	4 July 1999 (aged 19)	(Senegalese Football Federation) Cayor Foot
17	MF	**Dion Lopy**	2 February 2002 (aged 17)	(Senegalese Football Federation) Oslo Football Academy
18	MF	Faly Ndaw	7 August 1999 (aged 19)	(Senegalese Football Federation) Teungueth
19	FW	**Youssouph Badji**	20 December 2001 (aged 17)	(Senegalese Football Federation) Casa Sports
20	MF	Amadou Ciss	10 April 1999 (aged 20)	(Royal Dutch Football Association) Fortuna Sittard
21	GK	François Djiba	23 November 2000 (aged 18)	(Senegalese Football Federation) Diambars

== Group B ==
=== Mexico ===
Head coach: Diego Ramírez

The final squad was announced on 23 April.

No.	Pos.	Player	Date of birth (age)	Club
1	GK	Carlos Higuera	18 November 2000 (aged 18)	(Mexican Football Federation) Tijuana
2	DF	**Kevin Álvarez**	15 January 1999 (aged 20)	(Mexican Football Federation) Pachuca
3	DF	**Gilberto Sepúlveda**	4 February 1999 (aged 20)	(Mexican Football Federation) Guadalajara
4	DF	Efraín Orona	22 February 1999 (aged 20)	(Mexican Football Federation) Pachuca
5	DF	Arturo Cárdenas	15 April 1999 (aged 20)	(Mexican Football Federation) Querétaro
6	MF	Alan Torres	19 February 2000 (aged 19)	(Mexican Football Federation) Guadalajara
7	MF	Diego Hernández	13 August 1999 (aged 19)	(Mexican Football Federation) Guadalajara
8	MF	Misael Domínguez	27 October 1999 (aged 19)	(Mexican Football Federation) Cruz Azul
9	FW	**José Juan Macías**	22 September 1999 (aged 19)	(Mexican Football Federation) León
10	MF	**Diego Lainez**	9 June 2000 (aged 18)	(Royal Spanish Football Federation) Real Betis
11	FW	**Roberto de la Rosa**	4 January 2000 (aged 19)	(Mexican Football Federation) Pachuca
12	GK	Luis López	20 December 1999 (aged 19)	(Mexican Football Federation) Dorados
13	DF	Mario Trejo	9 March 1999 (aged 20)	(Mexican Football Federation) Monarcas Morelia
14	DF	Oswaldo León	15 June 1999 (aged 19)	(Mexican Football Federation) América
15	MF	José Plascencia	18 June 1999 (aged 19)	(Mexican Football Federation) Necaxa
16	MF	Roberto Meraz	4 August 1999 (aged 19)	(Mexican Football Federation) Monarcas Morelia
17	FW	Daniel López	14 March 2000 (aged 19)	(Mexican Football Federation) Tijuana
18	MF	Carlos Gutiérrez	5 February 1999 (aged 20)	(Mexican Football Federation) UNAM
19	MF	Antonio Figueroa	13 June 1999 (aged 19)	(Mexican Football Federation) Pachuca
20	MF	Adrián Lozano	8 May 1999 (aged 20)	(Mexican Football Federation) Santos Laguna
21	GK	Ángel Alonzo	27 January 2000 (aged 19)	(Mexican Football Federation) Necaxa

=== Italy ===
Head coach: Paolo Nicolato

The final squad was announced on 14 April.

No.	Pos.	Player	Date of birth (age)	Club
1	GK	Alessandro Plizzari	12 March 2000 (aged 19)	(Italian Football Federation) Milan
2	DF	Antonio Candela	27 April 2000 (aged 19)	(Italian Football Federation) Genoa
3	DF	Alessandro Tripaldelli	9 February 1999 (aged 20)	(Italian Football Federation) Crotone
4	DF	Matteo Gabbia	21 October 1999 (aged 19)	(Italian Football Federation) Lucchese
5	DF	**Alessandro Buongiorno**	6 June 1999 (aged 19)	(Italian Football Federation) Carpi
6	DF	Davide Bettella	7 April 2000 (aged 19)	(Italian Football Federation) Pescara
7	MF	**Davide Frattesi**	22 September 1999 (aged 19)	(Italian Football Federation) Ascoli
8	MF	Andrea Colpani	11 May 1999 (aged 20)	(Italian Football Federation) Atalanta
9	FW	**Andrea Pinamonti** (captain)	19 May 1999 (aged 20)	(Italian Football Federation) Frosinone
10	FW	Christian Capone	28 April 1999 (aged 20)	(Italian Football Federation) Pescara
11	FW	**Gianluca Scamacca**	1 January 1999 (aged 20)	(Italian Football Federation) Sassuolo
12	GK	Marco Carnesecchi	1 July 2000 (aged 18)	(Italian Football Federation) Atalanta
13	DF	**Luca Ranieri**	23 April 1999 (aged 20)	(Italian Football Federation) Foggia
14	DF	**Raoul Bellanova**	17 May 2000 (aged 19)	(Italian Football Federation) Milan
15	DF	Enrico Del Prato	10 November 1999 (aged 19)	(Italian Football Federation) Atalanta
16	FW	Gabriele Gori	13 February 1999 (aged 20)	(Italian Football Federation) Livorno
17	DF	**Luca Pellegrini**	7 March 1999 (aged 20)	(Italian Football Federation) Cagliari
18	FW	Marco Olivieri	30 June 1999 (aged 19)	(Italian Football Federation) Juventus
19	MF	Domenico Alberico	23 January 1999 (aged 20)	(German Football Association) 1899 Hoffenheim
20	MF	**Salvatore Esposito**	7 October 2000 (aged 18)	(Italian Football Federation) Ravenna
21	GK	Leonardo Loria	28 March 1999 (aged 20)	(Italian Football Federation) Juventus

=== Japan ===
Head coach: Masanaga Kageyama

The final squad was announced on 7 May.

No.	Pos.	Player	Date of birth (age)	Club
1	GK	Tomoya Wakahara	28 December 1999 (aged 19)	(Japan Football Association) Kyoto Sanga
2	DF	Shunki Higashi	28 July 2000 (aged 18)	(Japan Football Association) Sanfrecce Hiroshima
3	DF	Yuki Kobayashi	18 July 2000 (aged 18)	(Japan Football Association) Vissel Kobe
4	DF	**Ayumu Seko**	7 June 2000 (aged 18)	(Japan Football Association) Cerezo Osaka
5	DF	**Yukinari Sugawara**	28 June 2000 (aged 18)	(Japan Football Association) Nagoya Grampus
6	MF	Yuta Goke	10 June 1999 (aged 19)	(Japan Football Association) Vissel Kobe
7	MF	**Hiroki Itō**	12 May 1999 (aged 20)	(Japan Football Association) Nagoya Grampus
8	MF	Kanya Fujimoto	1 July 1999 (aged 19)	(Japan Football Association) Tokyo Verdy
9	FW	**Kōki Saitō**	10 August 2001 (aged 17)	(Japan Football Association) Yokohama FC
10	MF	Mitsuki Saito	10 January 1999 (aged 20)	(Japan Football Association) Shonan Bellmare
11	FW	**Kyosuke Tagawa**	11 February 1999 (aged 20)	(Japan Football Association) FC Tokyo
12	GK	Shu Mogi	15 January 1999 (aged 20)	(Japan Football Association) Cerezo Osaka
13	FW	**Taisei Miyashiro**	26 May 2000 (aged 18)	(Japan Football Association) Kawasaki Frontale
14	FW	Jun Nishikawa	21 February 2002 (aged 17)	(Japan Football Association) Cerezo Osaka
15	DF	Tōichi Suzuki	30 May 2000 (aged 18)	(Japan Football Association) Shonan Bellmare
16	MF	Kota Yamada	10 July 1999 (aged 19)	(Japan Football Association) Yokohama F. Marinos
17	DF	KennedyEgbus Mikuni	23 June 2000 (aged 18)	(Japan Football Association) Avispa Fukuoka
18	FW	**Taichi Hara**	5 May 1999 (aged 20)	(Japan Football Association) FC Tokyo
19	DF	Hinata Kida	4 July 2000 (aged 18)	(Japan Football Association) Avispa Fukuoka
20	FW	**Keito Nakamura**	28 July 2000 (aged 18)	(Japan Football Association) Gamba Osaka
21	GK	**Zion Suzuki**	21 August 2002 (aged 16)	(Japan Football Association) Urawa Red Diamonds

=== Ecuador ===
Head coach: (Argentina) Jorge Célico

The final squad was announced on 25 April.

No.	Pos.	Player	Date of birth (age)	Club
1	GK	**Wellington Ramírez**	9 September 2000 (aged 18)	(Royal Spanish Football Federation) Real Sociedad
2	DF	**Jackson Porozo**	4 August 2000 (aged 18)	(Brazilian Football Confederation) Santos
3	DF	**Diego Palacios**	12 July 1999 (aged 19)	(Royal Dutch Football Association) Willem II
4	DF	**Jhon Espinoza**	24 February 1999 (aged 20)	(Ecuadorian Football Federation) Aucas
5	MF	**Jordy Alcívar**	5 August 1999 (aged 19)	(Ecuadorian Football Federation) LDU Quito
6	DF	**Gustavo Vallecilla**	28 May 1999 (aged 19)	(Ecuadorian Football Federation) Aucas
7	MF	Luis Estupiñán	13 May 1999 (aged 20)	(Ecuadorian Football Federation) Mushuc Runa
8	MF	**José Cifuentes**	12 March 1999 (aged 20)	(Ecuadorian Football Federation) América de Quito
9	FW	**Leonardo Campana**	24 July 2000 (aged 18)	(Ecuadorian Football Federation) Barcelona
10	MF	Jordan Rezabala	29 February 2000 (aged 19)	(Ecuadorian Football Federation) Independiente del Valle
11	FW	**Alexander Alvarado**	21 April 1999 (aged 20)	(Ecuadorian Football Federation) Aucas
12	GK	Pierre Bellolio	22 June 1999 (aged 19)	(Ecuadorian Football Federation) Universidad Católica
13	MF	Jefferson Arce	29 May 2000 (aged 18)	(Ecuadorian Football Federation) LDU Quito
14	DF	Richard Mina	22 July 1999 (aged 19)	(Ecuadorian Football Federation) Aucas
15	DF	Luis Castillo	26 April 1999 (aged 20)	(Ecuadorian Football Federation) Atlético Santo Domingo
16	MF	Sergio Quintero	12 March 1999 (aged 20)	(Ecuadorian Football Federation) Imbabura
17	FW	**Stiven Plaza**	11 March 1999 (aged 20)	(Royal Spanish Football Federation) Valladolid
18	DF	Luis Loor	4 October 1999 (aged 19)	(Ecuadorian Football Federation) Independiente del Valle
19	FW	Daniel Segura	17 March 1999 (aged 20)	(Ecuadorian Football Federation) América de Quito
20	FW	**Gonzalo Plata**	1 November 2000 (aged 18)	(Portuguese Football Federation) Sporting CP
21	GK	Johan Lara	28 February 1999 (aged 20)	(Ecuadorian Football Federation) Aucas

== Group C ==
=== Honduras ===
Head coach: Carlos Tábora

The final squad was announced on 4 May.

No.	Pos.	Player	Date of birth (age)	Club
1	GK	José García	28 February 2000 (aged 19)	(National Autonomous Federation of Football of Honduras) Real España
2	DF	**Elison Rivas**	20 November 1999 (aged 19)	(National Autonomous Federation of Football of Honduras) Real España
3	DF	Darwin Diego	14 July 1999 (aged 19)	(National Autonomous Federation of Football of Honduras) Vida
4	DF	Axel Gómez	28 June 2000 (aged 18)	(National Autonomous Federation of Football of Honduras) Olimpia
5	DF	**Wesly Decas**	11 August 1999 (aged 19)	(United States Soccer Federation) Atlanta United FC
6	MF	Everson López	3 November 2000 (aged 18)	(National Autonomous Federation of Football of Honduras) Motagua
7	MF	Cristian Cálix	9 September 1999 (aged 19)	(Mexican Football Federation) Atlas
8	MF	**Gerson Chávez**	31 January 2000 (aged 19)	(National Autonomous Federation of Football of Honduras) Real España
9	FW	César Romero	19 January 1999 (aged 20)	(United States Soccer Federation) Colorado Springs Switchbacks
10	MF	**Carlos Mejía**	19 February 2000 (aged 19)	(National Autonomous Federation of Football of Honduras) Vida
11	FW	Josué Villafranca	16 December 1999 (aged 19)	(National Autonomous Federation of Football of Honduras) Motagua
12	GK	Óscar Reyes	31 January 1999 (aged 20)	(National Autonomous Federation of Football of Honduras) Vida
13	MF	Selvin Guevara	15 February 1999 (aged 20)	(National Autonomous Federation of Football of Honduras) Real España
14	MF	**Joseph Rosales**	6 November 2000 (aged 18)	(Panamanian Football Federation) CAI La Chorrera
15	DF	Maynor Antúnez	21 January 2001 (aged 18)	(National Autonomous Federation of Football of Honduras) Social Sol
16	MF	Jack Jean-Baptiste	20 December 1999 (aged 19)	(United States Soccer Federation) Loudoun United
17	FW	**Luis Palma**	17 January 2000 (aged 19)	(United States Soccer Federation) Real Monarchs
18	DF	Jonathan Núñez	26 November 2001 (aged 17)	(National Autonomous Federation of Football of Honduras) Motagua
19	DF	Mariano Álvarez	2 May 1999 (aged 20)	(National Autonomous Federation of Football of Honduras) Real España
20	FW	Patrick Palacios	29 January 2000 (aged 19)	(National Autonomous Federation of Football of Honduras) Real España
21	GK	Johan Villanueva	29 July 1999 (aged 19)	(National Autonomous Federation of Football of Honduras) Marathón

=== New Zealand ===
Head coach: (England) Des Buckingham

The final squad was announced on 16 April 2019.

No.	Pos.	Player	Date of birth (age)	Club
1	GK	**Michael Woud**	16 January 1999 (aged 20)	(Royal Dutch Football Association) Willem II
2	DF	George Stanger	15 August 2000 (aged 18)	(Scottish Football Association) Hamilton Academical
3	DF	**Dalton Wilkins**	15 April 1999 (aged 20)	(Danish Football Association) FC Helsingør
4	DF	**Gianni Stensness** (Note: Capped for Australia.)	7 February 1999 (aged 20)	(New Zealand Football) Wellington Phoenix
5	DF	**Nando Pijnaker**	25 February 1999 (aged 20)	(New Zealand Football) Eastern Suburbs
6	MF	Dane Schnell	14 May 1999 (aged 20)	(New Zealand Football) Western Springs
7	MF	**Elijah Just**	1 May 2000 (aged 19)	(Danish Football Association) FC Helsingør
8	MF	**Joe Bell**	27 April 1999 (aged 20)	(United States Soccer Federation) Virginia Cavaliers
9	FW	**Max Mata**	10 July 2000 (aged 18)	(Swiss Football Association) Grasshoppers
10	MF	**Sarpreet Singh**	20 February 1999 (aged 20)	(New Zealand Football) Wellington Phoenix
11	FW	Matt Conroy	1 April 2001 (aged 18)	(New Zealand Football) Western Springs
12	GK	Cameron Brown	9 July 1999 (aged 19)	(New Zealand Football) Central United
13	DF	**Liberato Cacace**	27 September 2000 (aged 18)	(New Zealand Football) Wellington Phoenix
14	MF	Leon van den Hoven	20 April 2000 (aged 19)	(Royal Dutch Football Association) RKC Waalwijk
15	MF	Trevor Zwetsloot	16 October 1999 (aged 19)	(German Football Association) Werder Bremen
16	MF	Dominic Wooldridge	11 March 1999 (aged 20)	(New Zealand Football) Western Suburbs
17	DF	**Callan Elliot**	7 July 1999 (aged 19)	(New Zealand Football) Wellington Phoenix
18	FW	**Ben Waine**	11 June 2001 (aged 17)	(New Zealand Football) Wellington Phoenix
19	FW	**Callum McCowatt**	30 April 1999 (aged 20)	(New Zealand Football) Eastern Suburbs
20	MF	Willem Ebbinge	6 January 2001 (aged 18)	(New Zealand Football) Lower Hutt City
21	GK	Zac Jones	27 November 2000 (aged 18)	(New Zealand Football) Wellington Phoenix

=== Uruguay ===
Head coach: Gustavo Ferreyra

The final squad was announced on 6 May 2019.

No.	Pos.	Player	Date of birth (age)	Club
1	GK	**Franco Israel**	22 April 2000 (aged 19)	(Italian Football Federation) Juventus
2	DF	**Bruno Méndez** (captain)	10 September 1999 (aged 19)	(Brazilian Football Confederation) Corinthians
3	DF	**Sebastián Cáceres**	18 August 1999 (aged 19)	(Uruguayan Football Association) Liverpool
4	DF	Ezequiel Busquets	24 October 2000 (aged 18)	(Uruguayan Football Association) Peñarol
5	MF	Martín Barrios	24 January 1999 (aged 20)	(Uruguayan Football Association) Racing
6	DF	**Maximiliano Araújo**	15 February 2000 (aged 19)	(Uruguayan Football Association) Montevideo Wanderers
7	FW	Emiliano Gómez	18 September 2001 (aged 17)	(Uruguayan Football Association) Defensor Sporting
8	MF	Santiago Rodríguez	8 January 2000 (aged 19)	(Uruguayan Football Association) Nacional
9	FW	**Darwin Núñez**	24 June 1999 (aged 19)	(Uruguayan Football Association) Peñarol
10	FW	Nicolás Schiappacasse	12 January 1999 (aged 20)	(Italian Football Federation) Parma
11	FW	**Brian Rodríguez**	20 May 2000 (aged 19)	(Uruguayan Football Association) Peñarol
12	GK	Renzo Rodríguez	23 January 1999 (aged 20)	(Argentine Football Association) Independiente
13	DF	Emiliano Ancheta	9 June 1999 (aged 19)	(Uruguayan Football Association) Danubio
14	MF	Francisco Ginella	21 January 1999 (aged 20)	(Uruguayan Football Association) Montevideo Wanderers
15	DF	Edgar Elizalde	27 February 2000 (aged 19)	(Italian Football Federation) Pescara
16	MF	Nicolás Acevedo	14 April 1999 (aged 20)	(Uruguayan Football Association) Liverpool
17	MF	Thomás Chacón	17 August 2000 (aged 18)	(Uruguayan Football Association) Danubio
18	MF	**Juan Manuel Sanabria**	29 March 2000 (aged 19)	(Royal Spanish Football Federation) Atlético Madrid B
19	DF	**Ronald Araújo**	7 March 1999 (aged 20)	(Royal Spanish Football Federation) Barcelona B
20	FW	Juan Boselli	9 November 1999 (aged 19)	(Royal Spanish Football Federation) Girona
21	GK	Mauro Silveira	6 May 2000 (aged 19)	(Uruguayan Football Association) Montevideo Wanderers

=== Norway ===
Head coach: Pål Arne Johansen

The final squad was announced on 30 April 2019.

No.	Pos.	Player	Date of birth (age)	Club
1	GK	Markus Olsen Pettersen	12 February 1999 (aged 20)	(Norwegian Football Federation) Nest-Sotra
2	DF	Christian Borchgrevink	11 May 1999 (aged 20)	(Norwegian Football Federation) Vålerenga
3	DF	John Kitolano	18 October 1999 (aged 19)	(The Football Association) Wolverhampton Wanderers
4	DF	Lars Ranger	12 March 1999 (aged 20)	(Norwegian Football Federation) Ullensaker/Kisa
5	DF	**Leo Østigård**	28 November 1999 (aged 19)	(The Football Association) Brighton & Hove Albion
6	MF	Adnan Hadzic	8 March 1999 (aged 20)	(Norwegian Football Federation) IK Start
7	MF	**Hugo Vetlesen**	29 February 2000 (aged 19)	(Norwegian Football Federation) Stabæk
8	MF	Emil Bohinen	12 March 1999 (aged 20)	(Norwegian Football Federation) Stabæk
9	FW	**Kristian Thorstvedt**	13 March 1999 (aged 20)	(Norwegian Football Federation) Viking
10	MF	Eman Markovic	8 May 1999 (aged 20)	(Football Association of Bosnia and Herzegovina) HŠK Zrinjski
11	FW	**Jens Petter Hauge**	12 October 1999 (aged 19)	(Norwegian Football Federation) Bodø/Glimt
12	GK	Julian Faye Lund	20 May 1999 (aged 20)	(Norwegian Football Federation) Rosenborg
13	GK	Erik-Johannes Arnebrott	28 April 1999 (aged 20)	(Norwegian Football Federation) Viking
14	DF	Ulrik Fredriksen	17 June 1999 (aged 19)	(Norwegian Football Federation) Sogndal
15	DF	Tomas Totland	28 September 1999 (aged 19)	(Norwegian Football Federation) Sogndal
16	MF	Tobias Børkeeiet	18 April 1999 (aged 20)	(Norwegian Football Federation) Stabæk
17	DF	**Håkon Evjen**	14 February 2000 (aged 19)	(Norwegian Football Federation) Bodø/Glimt
18	MF	Tobias Svendsen	31 August 1999 (aged 19)	(Norwegian Football Federation) Sandefjord
19	FW	**Erling Haaland**	21 July 2000 (aged 18)	(Austrian Football Association) Red Bull Salzburg
20	MF	Tobias Christensen	11 May 2000 (aged 19)	(Norwegian Football Federation) IK Start
21	MF	**Ola Brynhildsen**	27 April 1999 (aged 20)	(Norwegian Football Federation) Stabæk

== Group D ==
=== Qatar ===
Head coach: (Portugal) Bruno Pinheiro

No.	Pos.	Player	Date of birth (age)	Club
1	GK	**Salah Zakaria**	24 April 1999 (aged 20)	(Royal Belgian Football Association) Eupen
2	DF	Nasir Peer	27 January 1999 (aged 20)	(Qatar Football Association) Qatar SC
3	DF	Ahmed Al-Minhali	5 May 1999 (aged 20)	(Qatar Football Association) Al-Sailiya
4	MF	Abdullah Ali Saei	17 March 1999 (aged 20)	(Royal Belgian Football Association) Eupen
5	DF	Yousef Ayman	21 March 1999 (aged 20)	(Qatar Football Association) Qatar SC
6	MF	Nasser Al Yazidi	2 February 2000 (aged 19)	(Qatar Football Association) Al-Duhail
7	FW	Abdulrasheed Umaru	12 August 1999 (aged 19)	(Qatar Football Association) Al-Ahli
8	MF	Andri Syahputra	29 June 1999 (aged 19)	(Qatar Football Association) Al-Gharafa
9	FW	**Yusuf Abdurisag**	6 August 1999 (aged 19)	(Qatar Football Association) Al-Arabi
10	MF	Khaled Mohammed	7 June 2000 (aged 18)	(Qatar Football Association) Qatar SC
11	FW	Abdullah Murisi	24 August 1999 (aged 19)	(Qatar Football Association) Al-Khor
12	DF	**Homam Ahmed**	25 August 1999 (aged 19)	(Royal Belgian Football Association) Eupen
13	DF	Ali Malolah	26 February 1999 (aged 20)	(Qatar Football Association) Al-Wakrah
14	FW	Eisa Palangi	21 February 1999 (aged 20)	(Qatar Football Association) Qatar SC
15	DF	Bahaa Mamdouh	18 April 1999 (aged 20)	(Qatar Football Association) Al-Sadd
16	FW	**Hashim Ali**	17 August 2000 (aged 18)	(Qatar Football Association) Al-Arabi
17	MF	**Mohammed Waad**	18 September 1999 (aged 19)	(Qatar Football Association) Al-Ahli
18	GK	Shehab Mamdouh	18 April 2000 (aged 19)	(Qatar Football Association) Al-Duhail
19	DF	**Ahmed Suhail**	8 February 1999 (aged 20)	(Qatar Football Association) Al-Ahli
20	MF	Ahmed Al-Sibai	6 January 1999 (aged 20)	(Qatar Football Association) Al-Duhail
21	GK	Marwan Badreldin	17 April 1999 (aged 20)	(Qatar Football Association) Al-Ahli

=== Nigeria ===
Head coach: Paul Aigbogun

The final squad was announced on 13 May 2019.

No.	Pos.	Player	Date of birth (age)	Club
1	GK	Detan Ogundare	8 December 2000 (aged 18)	(Nigeria Football Federation) Kogi United
2	DF	Zulkifilu Rabiu	1 January 2002 (aged 17)	(Nigeria Football Federation) Plateau United
3	DF	**Ikouwem Udo**	11 November 1999 (aged 19)	(Nigeria Football Federation) Enyimba
4	MF	Peter Eletu	24 January 2000 (aged 19)	(Nigeria Football Federation) Prince Kazeem FC
5	DF	Aliu Salawudeen	28 September 1999 (aged 19)	(Nigeria Football Federation) Emmanuel Amuneke Academy
6	DF	**Valentine Ozornwafor**	1 June 1999 (aged 19)	(Nigeria Football Federation) Enyimba
7	MF	Yira Sor	24 July 2000 (aged 18)	(Nigeria Football Federation) 36 Lion Soccer Academy
8	MF	Tom Dele-Bashiru	17 September 1999 (aged 19)	(The Football Association) Manchester City
9	FW	**Akor Adams**	29 January 2000 (aged 19)	(Norwegian Football Federation) Sogndal
10	MF	Aniekeme Okon	8 May 1999 (aged 20)	(Nigeria Football Federation) Akwa United
11	FW	Okechukwu Offia	26 December 1999 (aged 19)	(Swedish Football Association) Sirius
12	DF	Igoh Ogbu	8 February 2000 (aged 19)	(Norwegian Football Federation) Rosenborg
13	MF	Nathan Ofoborh	7 November 1999 (aged 19)	(The Football Association) Bournemouth
14	MF	**Kingsley Michael**	26 August 1999 (aged 19)	(Italian Football Federation) Perugia
15	DF	Jamil Muhammad	12 November 2000 (aged 18)	(Nigeria Football Federation) Kano Pillars
16	GK	Olawale Oremade	31 December 1999 (aged 19)	(Nigeria Football Federation) Oasis FC
17	MF	Success Makanjuola	24 May 2001 (aged 17)	(Nigeria Football Federation) Water FC
18	FW	Chinonso Emeka	30 August 2001 (aged 17)	(The Football Association) AFC Hayes
19	MF	Maxwell Effiom	5 November 1999 (aged 19)	(Nigeria Football Federation) Enyimba
20	FW	Muhamed Tijani	26 July 2000 (aged 18)	(Football Association of the Czech Republic) Baník Ostrava
21	GK	Jonathan Zaccala	8 October 2001 (aged 17)	(Italian Football Federation) Triestina

=== Ukraine ===
Head coach: Oleksandr Petrakov

The 25-man provisional squad was announced on 7 May 2019. Vitaliy Mykolenko was replaced by Oleh Veremiyenko on 23 May due to injury.

No.	Pos.	Player	Date of birth (age)	Club
1	GK	**Andriy Lunin**	11 February 1999 (aged 20)	(Royal Spanish Football Federation) Leganés
2	DF	**Valeriy Bondar** (C)	27 February 1999 (aged 20)	(Ukrainian Association of Football) Shakhtar Donetsk
3	DF	Oleksandr Safronov	11 June 1999 (aged 19)	(Ukrainian Association of Football) Dnipro-1
4	DF	**Denys Popov**	17 February 1999 (aged 20)	(Ukrainian Association of Football) Dynamo Kyiv
5	DF	Oleh Veremiyenko	13 February 1999 (aged 20)	(Ukrainian Association of Football) Kalush
6	MF	Maksym Chekh	3 January 1999 (aged 20)	(Ukrainian Association of Football) Shakhtar Donetsk
7	MF	**Heorhiy Tsitaishvili** (Note: Capped for Georgia.)	18 November 2000 (aged 18)	(Ukrainian Association of Football) Dynamo Kyiv
8	MF	Oleksiy Khakhlyov	6 February 1999 (aged 20)	(Royal Spanish Football Federation) Alavés
9	DF	**Viktor Korniyenko**	14 February 1999 (aged 20)	(Ukrainian Association of Football) Shakhtar Donetsk
10	MF	**Serhiy Buletsa**	16 February 1999 (aged 20)	(Ukrainian Association of Football) Dynamo Kyiv
11	FW	Vladyslav Supriaha	15 February 2000 (aged 19)	(Ukrainian Association of Football) Dynamo Kyiv
12	GK	Vladyslav Kucheruk	14 February 1999 (aged 20)	(Ukrainian Association of Football) Dynamo Kyiv
13	DF	Danylo Beskorovainyi	7 February 1999 (aged 20)	(Slovak Football Association) Zemplín
14	FW	**Danylo Sikan**	16 April 2001 (aged 18)	(Ukrainian Association of Football) Mariupol
15	MF	Kyrylo Dryshlyuk	16 September 1999 (aged 19)	(Ukrainian Association of Football) Oleksandriya
16	MF	Mykola Musolitin	21 January 1999 (aged 20)	(Ukrainian Association of Football) Chornomorets Odesa
17	DF	**Yukhym Konoplya**	26 August 1999 (aged 19)	(Ukrainian Association of Football) Shakhtar Donetsk
18	FW	Denys Ustymenko	12 April 1999 (aged 20)	(Ukrainian Association of Football) Oleksandriya
19	DF	Ihor Snurnitsyn	7 March 2000 (aged 19)	(Ukrainian Association of Football) Olimpik Donetsk
20	GK	**Dmytro Riznyk**	30 January 1999 (aged 20)	(Ukrainian Association of Football) Vorskla Poltava
21	MF	Oleksiy Kashchuk	29 June 2000 (aged 18)	(Ukrainian Association of Football) Shakhtar Donetsk

=== United States ===
Head coach: Tab Ramos

The 21-man final squad was announced on 10 May. Ayo Akinola was replaced by Julián Araujo on 22 May due to injury.

No.	Pos.	Player	Date of birth (age)	Club
1	GK	Brady Scott	30 June 1999 (aged 19)	(German Football Association) 1. FC Köln
2	DF	**Sergiño Dest**	3 November 2000 (aged 18)	(Royal Dutch Football Association) Ajax
3	DF	Chris Gloster	28 July 2000 (aged 18)	(German Football Association) Hannover 96
4	DF	**Mark McKenzie**	25 February 1999 (aged 20)	(United States Soccer Federation) Philadelphia Union
5	DF	**Chris Richards**	28 March 2000 (aged 19)	(German Football Association) Bayern Munich
6	MF	Chris Durkin	8 February 2000 (aged 19)	(United States Soccer Federation) D.C. United
7	DF	**Julián Araujo** (Note: Also capped for Mexico.)	13 August 2001 (aged 17)	(United States Soccer Federation) LA Galaxy
8	MF	Alex Mendez	6 September 2000 (aged 18)	(German Football Association) SC Freiburg
9	FW	**Sebastian Soto**	28 July 2000 (aged 18)	(German Football Association) Hannover 96
10	MF	**Paxton Pomykal**	17 December 1999 (aged 19)	(United States Soccer Federation) FC Dallas
11	FW	**Timothy Weah**	22 February 2000 (aged 19)	(French Football Federation) Paris Saint-Germain
12	GK	David Ochoa	16 January 2001 (aged 18)	(United States Soccer Federation) Real Salt Lake
13	DF	Aboubacar Keita	6 April 2000 (aged 19)	(United States Soccer Federation) Columbus Crew
14	MF	Edwin Cerrillo	3 October 2000 (aged 18)	(United States Soccer Federation) FC Dallas
15	DF	Matthew Real	10 July 1999 (aged 19)	(United States Soccer Federation) Philadelphia Union
16	MF	**Brandon Servania**	12 March 1999 (aged 20)	(United States Soccer Federation) FC Dallas
17	FW	**Konrad de la Fuente**	16 July 2001 (aged 17)	(Royal Spanish Football Federation) Barcelona
18	FW	**Ulysses Llanez**	2 April 2001 (aged 18)	(German Football Association) VfL Wolfsburg
19	FW	Justin Rennicks	20 March 1999 (aged 20)	(United States Soccer Federation) New England Revolution
20	MF	**Richard Ledezma** (Note: Also capped for Mexico.)	6 September 2000 (aged 18)	(Royal Dutch Football Association) PSV Eindhoven
21	GK	**CJ dos Santos** (Note: Capped for Cape Verde)	24 August 2000 (aged 18)	(Portuguese Football Federation) Benfica

== Group E ==
=== Panama ===
Head coach: Jorge Dely Valdés

The 23-man provisional squad was announced on 29 April 2019.

No.	Pos.	Player	Date of birth (age)	Club
1	GK	Marcos Allen	8 February 1999 (aged 20)	(Panamanian Football Federation) Plaza Amador
2	DF	Rodolfo Rodríguez	18 March 1999 (aged 20)	(Panamanian Football Federation) Leones de América
3	DF	**Guillermo Benítez**	5 March 1999 (aged 20)	(United States Soccer Federation) Atlanta United FC
4	DF	**Manuel Gamboa**	5 February 1999 (aged 20)	(Panamanian Football Federation) Universitario
5	MF	**Carlos Harvey**	3 February 2000 (aged 19)	(United States Soccer Federation) LA Galaxy
6	MF	**Ernesto Walker**	9 February 1999 (aged 20)	(United States Soccer Federation) LA Galaxy
7	FW	Efraín Bristan	20 January 1999 (aged 20)	(Panamanian Football Federation) Árabe Unido
8	MF	**Víctor Griffith**	12 December 2000 (aged 18)	(Costa Rican Football Federation) Santos
9	FW	**Eduardo Guerrero**	21 February 2000 (aged 19)	(Israel Football Association) Maccabi Tel Aviv
10	MF	**Ángel Orelién**	2 April 2001 (aged 18)	(Panamanian Football Federation) Sporting San Miguelito
11	DF	**Jorge Méndez**	6 April 2001 (aged 18)	(Panamanian Football Federation) Universitario
12	GK	Emerson Dimas	10 August 2001 (aged 17)	(Panamanian Football Federation) CAI La Chorrera
13	MF	Carlos Kirton	2 August 1999 (aged 19)	(Panamanian Football Federation) CAI La Chorrera
14	MF	**Jovani Welch**	7 December 1999 (aged 19)	(Panamanian Football Federation) Alianza
15	MF	**Diego Valanta**	8 September 2000 (aged 18)	(Panamanian Football Federation) Tauro
16	FW	**Tomás Rodríguez**	9 March 1999 (aged 20)	(Panamanian Football Federation) Alianza
17	DF	Soyell Trejos	19 April 2000 (aged 19)	(Panamanian Football Federation) Árabe Unido
18	FW	Axel McKenzie	10 July 1999 (aged 19)	(Panamanian Football Federation) Tauro
19	DF	Jesus West	19 June 1999 (aged 19)	(Canadian Soccer Association) Toronto FC
20	MF	Édgar Cunningham	2 October 2000 (aged 18)	(Panamanian Football Federation) Árabe Unido
21	GK	Kevin Mosquera	7 October 1999 (aged 19)	(Panamanian Football Federation) Sporting San Miguelito

=== Mali ===
Head coach: Mamoutou Kane

No.	Pos.	Player	Date of birth (age)	Club
1	GK	Alkalifa Coulibaly	3 December 2001 (aged 17)	(Malian Football Federation) Onze Créateurs
2	DF	Arnaud Konan	15 May 2000 (aged 19)	(Malian Football Federation) Etoiles du Mandé
3	DF	**Drissa Diarra**	1 May 1999 (aged 20)	(Malian Football Federation) AS Bamako
4	DF	Fode Konaté	2 December 2000 (aged 18)	(Malian Football Federation) AS Bamako
5	DF	Babou Fofana	10 April 1999 (aged 20)	(Malian Football Federation) Stade Malien
6	MF	**Ousmane Diakité**	25 July 2000 (aged 18)	(Austrian Football Association) Red Bull Salzburg
7	FW	Hadji Dramé	10 September 2000 (aged 18)	(Malian Football Federation) Yelleni Olimpic
8	MF	**Mohamed Camara**	6 January 2000 (aged 19)	(Austrian Football Association) Red Bull Salzburg
9	FW	**Ibrahima Koné**	16 June 1999 (aged 19)	(Norwegian Football Federation) Haugesund
10	MF	Mamadou Traoré	8 February 1999 (aged 20)	(Malian Football Federation) Stade Malien
11	FW	Boubacar Konté	2 March 2001 (aged 18)	(Norwegian Football Federation) Sarpsborg
12	FW	Mamady Diarra	26 June 2000 (aged 18)	(Malian Football Federation) Yeelen FC
13	DF	Clément Kanouté	1 September 1999 (aged 19)	(Malian Football Federation) CS Duguwolofila
14	MF	Sambou Sissoko	29 June 2000 (aged 18)	(Malian Football Federation) USFAS
15	DF	**Abdoulaye Diaby**	4 July 2000 (aged 18)	(Royal Belgian Football Association) Antwerp
16	GK	Youssouf Koïta	27 August 2000 (aged 18)	(Royal Spanish Football Federation) Girona
17	MF	Mamadou Samaké	15 May 2000 (aged 19)	(Royal Belgian Football Association) Standard Liège
18	MF	**Boubacar Traoré**	20 August 2001 (aged 17)	(Malian Football Federation) AS Bamako
19	FW	Lassana N'Diaye	3 October 2000 (aged 18)	(Russian Football Union) CSKA Moscow
20	FW	**Sékou Koïta**	28 November 1999 (aged 19)	(Austrian Football Association) Red Bull Salzburg
21	GK	Souleymane Coulibaly	28 August 2001 (aged 17)	(Malian Football Federation) Afrique Football Élite

=== France ===
Head coach: Bernard Diomède

The final squad was announced on 13 May 2019.

No.	Pos.	Player	Date of birth (age)	Club
1	GK	**Alban Lafont**	23 January 1999 (aged 20)	(Italian Football Federation) Fiorentina
2	DF	**Jean-Clair Todibo**	30 December 1999 (aged 19)	(Royal Spanish Football Federation) Barcelona
3	DF	**Evan Ndicka**	20 August 1999 (aged 19)	(German Football Association) Eintracht Frankfurt
4	DF	**Boubacar Kamara**	23 November 1999 (aged 19)	(French Football Federation) Marseille
5	DF	Dan-Axel Zagadou	3 June 1999 (aged 19)	(German Football Association) Borussia Dortmund
6	MF	Enzo Loiodice	27 November 2000 (aged 18)	(French Football Federation) Dijon
7	FW	Yacine Adli	29 July 2000 (aged 18)	(French Football Federation) Bordeaux
8	MF	Michaël Cuisance	16 August 1999 (aged 19)	(German Football Association) Borussia Mönchengladbach
9	FW	**Amine Gouiri**	16 February 2000 (aged 19)	(French Football Federation) Lyon
10	FW	**Moussa Diaby**	7 July 1999 (aged 19)	(French Football Federation) Paris Saint-Germain
11	FW	Nabil Alioui	18 February 1999 (aged 20)	(Royal Belgian Football Association) Cercle Brugge
12	DF	Sambou Sissoko	27 April 1999 (aged 20)	(French Football Federation) Reims
13	DF	Nicolas Cozza	8 January 1999 (aged 20)	(French Football Federation) Montpellier
14	MF	Ibrahima Diallo	8 March 1999 (aged 20)	(French Football Federation) Brest
15	DF	Thomas Basila	30 April 1999 (aged 20)	(French Football Federation) Nantes
16	GK	Illan Meslier	2 March 2000 (aged 19)	(French Football Federation) Lorient
17	FW	Lenny Pintor	5 August 2000 (aged 18)	(French Football Federation) Lyon
18	MF	**Youssouf Fofana**	10 January 1999 (aged 20)	(French Football Federation) Strasbourg
19	FW	**Moussa Sylla**	25 November 1999 (aged 19)	(French Football Federation) Monaco
20	MF	Boubakary Soumaré	27 February 1999 (aged 20)	(French Football Federation) Lille
21	GK	Didier Desprez	13 March 1999 (aged 20)	(French Football Federation) Drancy

=== Saudi Arabia ===
Head coach: Khaled Al-Atwi

No.	Pos.	Player	Date of birth (age)	Club
1	GK	Nawaf Al-Ghamdi	21 January 1999 (aged 20)	(Saudi Arabian Football Federation) Al-Hilal
2	DF	**Saud Abdulhamid**	18 July 1999 (aged 19)	(Saudi Arabian Football Federation) Al-Ittihad
3	DF	**Khalifah Al-Dawsari**	2 January 1999 (aged 20)	(Saudi Arabian Football Federation) Al-Qadsiah
4	DF	**Naif Almas**	18 January 2000 (aged 19)	(Saudi Arabian Football Federation) Al-Nassr
5	DF	**Hassan Tambakti**	9 February 1999 (aged 20)	(Saudi Arabian Football Federation) Al-Shabab
6	MF	Firas Al-Ghamdi	3 December 1999 (aged 19)	(Saudi Arabian Football Federation) Al-Ahli
7	FW	Yahya Al-Najei	2 March 1999 (aged 20)	(Saudi Arabian Football Federation) Al-Nassr
8	MF	**Hamed Al-Ghamdi**	2 April 1999 (aged 20)	(Saudi Arabian Football Federation) Al-Ettifaq
9	FW	**Firas Al-Buraikan**	14 May 2000 (aged 19)	(Saudi Arabian Football Federation) Al-Nassr
10	MF	**Turki Al-Ammar**	24 September 1999 (aged 19)	(Saudi Arabian Football Federation) Al-Shabab
11	MF	**Khalid Al-Ghannam**	8 November 2000 (aged 18)	(Saudi Arabian Football Federation) Al-Qadsiah
12	DF	Mohammed Al-Shanqiti	15 May 1999 (aged 20)	(Saudi Arabian Football Federation) Al-Nassr
13	DF	**Muhannad Al-Shanqeeti**	12 March 1999 (aged 20)	(Saudi Arabian Football Federation) Al-Ittihad
14	MF	Mansor Al Beshe	24 April 2000 (aged 19)	(Saudi Arabian Football Federation) Al-Hilal
15	MF	Faraj Al-Ghashayan	28 April 2000 (aged 19)	(Saudi Arabian Football Federation) Al-Nassr
16	DF	Hazim Al-Zahrani	23 April 1999 (aged 20)	(Saudi Arabian Football Federation) Al-Ittihad
17	MF	**Ibrahim Mahnashi**	18 November 1999 (aged 19)	(Saudi Arabian Football Federation) Al-Ettifaq
18	MF	Salem Al-Saleem	14 March 1999 (aged 20)	(Saudi Arabian Football Federation) Al-Hilal
19	MF	**Abdulmohsen Al-Qahtani**	5 June 1999 (aged 19)	(Saudi Arabian Football Federation) Al-Qadsiah
20	GK	Abdulrahman Al-Shammari	9 July 2000 (aged 18)	(Saudi Arabian Football Federation) Al-Nassr
21	GK	Mohammed Al-Dawsari	2 October 1999 (aged 19)	(Saudi Arabian Football Federation) Al-Shabab

== Group F ==
=== Portugal ===
Head coach: Hélio Sousa

The 22-man provisional squad was announced on 10 May 2019.

No.	Pos.	Player	Date of birth (age)	Club
1	GK	**Diogo Costa**	19 September 1999 (aged 19)	(Portuguese Football Federation) Porto
2	DF	**Diogo Dalot**	18 March 1999 (aged 20)	(The Football Association) Manchester United
3	DF	Diogo Queirós	5 January 1999 (aged 20)	(Portuguese Football Federation) Porto
4	DF	Diogo Leite	23 January 1999 (aged 20)	(Portuguese Football Federation) Porto
5	DF	Rúben Vinagre	9 April 1999 (aged 20)	(The Football Association) Wolverhampton Wanderers
6	MF	Florentino Luís	19 August 1999 (aged 19)	(Portuguese Football Federation) Benfica
7	FW	Jota	30 March 1999 (aged 20)	(Portuguese Football Federation) Benfica
8	MF	**Gedson Fernandes**	9 January 1999 (aged 20)	(Portuguese Football Federation) Benfica
9	FW	**Rafael Leão**	10 June 1999 (aged 19)	(French Football Federation) Lille
10	MF	Miguel Luís	27 February 1999 (aged 20)	(Portuguese Football Federation) Sporting CP
11	FW	Mesaque Djú	18 March 1999 (aged 20)	(The Football Association) West Ham United
12	GK	João Virgínia	10 October 1999 (aged 19)	(The Football Association) Everton
13	MF	Nuno Pina	31 March 1999 (aged 20)	(Italian Football Federation) Chievo
14	DF	Thierry Correia	9 March 1999 (aged 20)	(Portuguese Football Federation) Sporting CP
15	DF	Francisco Moura	16 August 1999 (aged 19)	(Portuguese Football Federation) Braga
16	DF	Romain Correia	6 September 1999 (aged 19)	(Portuguese Football Federation) Vitória de Guimarães
17	FW	**Francisco Trincão**	29 December 1999 (aged 19)	(Portuguese Football Federation) Braga
18	FW	**Pedro Neto**	9 March 2000 (aged 19)	(Italian Football Federation) Lazio
19	FW	Pedro Martelo	12 October 1999 (aged 19)	(Portuguese Football Federation) Braga
20	MF	Nuno Santos	2 March 1999 (aged 20)	(Portuguese Football Federation) Benfica
21	GK	Luís Maximiano	5 January 1999 (aged 20)	(Portuguese Football Federation) Sporting CP

=== South Korea ===
Head coach: Chung Jung-yong

The final squad was announced on 2 May 2019. On 12 May, Lee Kyu-hyuk was announced as a replacement for Jeong Woo-yeong after Bayern Munich declined to release him.

No.	Pos.	Player	Date of birth (age)	Club
1	GK	Lee Gwang-yeon	11 September 1999 (aged 19)	(Korea Football Association) Gangwon FC
2	DF	Hwang Tae-hyeon	29 January 1999 (aged 20)	(Korea Football Association) Ansan Greeners
3	DF	**Lee Jae-ik**	21 May 1999 (aged 20)	(Korea Football Association) Gangwon FC
4	DF	Lee Ji-sol	9 July 1999 (aged 19)	(Korea Football Association) Daejeon Hana Citizen
5	DF	Kim Hyun-woo	7 March 1999 (aged 20)	(Croatian Football Federation) Dinamo Zagreb
6	MF	**Kim Jung-min**	13 November 1999 (aged 19)	(Austrian Football Association) Red Bull Salzburg
7	FW	Jeon Se-jin	9 September 1999 (aged 19)	(Korea Football Association) Suwon Samsung Bluewings
8	DF	Lee Kyu-hyuk	4 May 1999 (aged 20)	(Korea Football Association) Jeju United
9	FW	Oh Se-hun	15 January 1999 (aged 20)	(Korea Football Association) Asan Mugunghwa
10	MF	**Lee Kang-in**	19 February 2001 (aged 18)	(Royal Spanish Football Federation) Valencia
11	FW	**Um Won-sang**	6 January 1999 (aged 20)	(Korea Football Association) Gwangju FC
12	GK	Park Ji-min	25 May 2000 (aged 18)	(Korea Football Association) Suwon Samsung Bluewings
13	MF	Go Jae-hyun	5 March 1999 (aged 20)	(Korea Football Association) Daegu FC
14	MF	Park Tae-jun	19 January 1999 (aged 20)	(Korea Football Association) Seongnam FC
15	MF	Jeong Ho-jin	6 August 1999 (aged 19)	(Korea Football Association) Korea University
16	DF	**Kim Ju-sung**	12 December 2000 (aged 18)	(Korea Football Association) FC Seoul
17	DF	Lee Sang-jun	14 October 1999 (aged 19)	(Korea Football Association) Busan IPark
18	FW	**Cho Young-wook**	5 February 1999 (aged 20)	(Korea Football Association) FC Seoul
19	DF	Cho Jun	17 April 1999 (aged 20)	(Korea Football Association) Yonsei University
20	MF	Kim Se-yun	29 April 1999 (aged 20)	(Korea Football Association) Daejeon Hana Citizen
21	GK	Choi Min-soo	26 February 2000 (aged 19)	(German Football Association) Hamburger SV

=== Argentina ===
Head coach: Fernando Batista

The final squad was announced on 3 May 2019.

No.	Pos.	Player	Date of birth (age)	Club
1	GK	Manuel Roffo	4 April 2000 (aged 19)	(Argentine Football Association) Boca Juniors
2	DF	**Nehuén Pérez**	24 June 2000 (aged 18)	(Royal Spanish Football Federation) Atlético Madrid
3	DF	Francisco Ortega	19 March 1999 (aged 20)	(Argentine Football Association) Vélez Sarsfield
4	DF	Facundo Mura	24 March 1999 (aged 20)	(Argentine Football Association) Estudiantes (LP)
5	MF	Santiago Sosa	3 May 1999 (aged 20)	(Argentine Football Association) River Plate
6	DF	Maximiliano Centurión	20 February 1999 (aged 20)	(Argentine Football Association) Argentinos Juniors
7	FW	**Julián Alvarez**	31 January 2000 (aged 19)	(Argentine Football Association) River Plate
8	MF	Agustín Almendra	11 February 2000 (aged 19)	(Argentine Football Association) Boca Juniors
9	FW	**Adolfo Gaich**	26 February 1999 (aged 20)	(Argentine Football Association) San Lorenzo
10	MF	Gonzalo Maroni	18 March 1999 (aged 20)	(Argentine Football Association) Talleres
11	MF	**Aníbal Moreno**	13 May 1999 (aged 20)	(Argentine Football Association) Newell's Old Boys
12	GK	Jerónimo Pourtau	23 January 2000 (aged 19)	(Argentine Football Association) Estudiantes (LP)
13	DF	Marcelo Weigandt	11 January 2000 (aged 19)	(Argentine Football Association) Boca Juniors
14	DF	**Facundo Medina**	28 May 1999 (aged 19)	(Argentine Football Association) Talleres
15	MF	Fausto Vera	26 March 2000 (aged 19)	(Argentine Football Association) Argentinos Juniors
16	FW	Agustín Urzi	4 May 2000 (aged 19)	(Argentine Football Association) Banfield
17	FW	Tomás Chancalay	1 January 1999 (aged 20)	(Argentine Football Association) Colón
18	MF	Cristian Ferreira	12 September 1999 (aged 19)	(Argentine Football Association) River Plate
19	FW	Pedro de la Vega	7 February 2001 (aged 18)	(Argentine Football Association) Lanús
20	MF	Esequiel Barco	29 March 1999 (aged 20)	(United States Soccer Federation) Atlanta United FC
21	GK	Joaquín Blázquez	28 January 2001 (aged 18)	(Royal Spanish Football Federation) Valencia

=== South Africa ===
Head coach: Thabo Senong

The final squad was announced on 14 May 2019.

No.	Pos.	Player	Date of birth (age)	Club
1	GK	Kopano Thuntsane	30 October 1999 (aged 19)	(South African Football Association) Orlando Pirates
2	DF	Keenan Abrahams	27 May 1999 (aged 19)	(South African Football Association) Ajax Cape Town
3	DF	Givemore Khupe	20 December 1999 (aged 19)	(South African Football Association) Cape Umoya
4	DF	Malebogo Modise	6 February 1999 (aged 20)	(South African Football Association) Mamelodi Sundowns
5	DF	**Sibusiso Mabiliso**	14 April 1999 (aged 20)	(South African Football Association) AmaZulu
6	DF	Fezile Gcaba	3 March 1999 (aged 20)	(South African Football Association) Orlando Pirates
7	MF	Promise Mkhuma	24 May 2000 (aged 18)	(South African Football Association) Mamelodi Sundowns
8	MF	**Njabulo Blom**	11 December 1999 (aged 19)	(South African Football Association) Kaizer Chiefs
9	MF	**Oswin Appollis**	25 August 2001 (aged 17)	(South African Football Association) SuperSport United
10	FW	**Lyle Foster**	3 September 2000 (aged 18)	(French Football Federation) Monaco
11	FW	Khanya Leshabela	18 September 1999 (aged 19)	(The Football Association) Leicester City
12	FW	Thabiso Monyane	30 April 2000 (aged 19)	(South African Football Association) Orlando Pirates
13	DF	Keenan Phillips	7 February 2000 (aged 19)	(South African Football Association) Bidvest Wits
14	MF	**Luke Le Roux**	10 March 2000 (aged 19)	(South African Football Association) SuperSport United
15	MF	Siphesihle Mkhize	5 February 1999 (aged 20)	(South African Football Association) Mamelodi Sundowns
16	GK	Glen Baadjies	27 March 2000 (aged 19)	(South African Football Association) Mamelodi Sundowns
17	MF	**Luvuyo Phewa**	8 November 1999 (aged 19)	(South African Football Association) Real Kings
18	FW	Leo Thethani	8 January 1999 (aged 20)	(Royal Dutch Football Association) Ajax
19	MF	**Kobamelo Kodisang**	28 August 1999 (aged 19)	(Portuguese Football Federation) Sanjoanense
20	GK	Khulekani Kubheka	7 January 1999 (aged 20)	(South African Football Association) Cape Umoya
21	DF	**Thabo Moloisane**	24 February 1999 (aged 20)	(South African Football Association) Mamelodi Sundowns
