= 2019 U-20 Africa Cup of Nations =

2019 Africa U-20 Cup of Nations
Coupe d'Afrique des nations des moins de 20 ans 2019

Tournament details
- Host country: Niger
- Dates: 2–17 February
- Teams: 8 (from 1 confederation)
- Venue: 2 (in 2 host cities)

Final positions
- Champions: Mali (1st title)
- Runners-up: Senegal
- Third place: South Africa
- Fourth place: Nigeria

Tournament statistics
- Matches played: 16
- Goals scored: 31 (1.94 per match)
- Top scorer(s): (Senegal) Youssouph Mamadou Badji (Senegal) Amadou Dia N'Diaye (3 goals each)
- Best player: (Senegal) Moussa N'Diaye
- Fair play award: Senegal

The 2019 Africa U-20 Cup of Nations was the 15th edition of the Africa U-20 Cup of Nations (22nd edition if tournaments without hosts are included), the biennial international youth football tournament organized by the Confederation of African Football (CAF) for players aged 20 and below. Niger hosted the tournament, which took place from 2 to 17 February 2019. The tournament involved 8 teams, with Niger making their U-20 Africa Cup of Nations debut.

The top four teams of the tournament qualified for the 2019 FIFA U-20 World Cup in Poland as the CAF representatives. Mali won their first title, while the other qualified teams which finished second to fourth were Senegal, South Africa and Nigeria. Defending champions Zambia failed to qualify.

== Qualification ==
The qualifiers were played between 30 March and 12 August 2018. At the end of the qualification phase, seven teams joined the hosts Niger.

=== Player eligibility ===
Players born 1 January 1999 or later are eligible to participate in the competition.

=== Qualified teams ===
The following eights teams qualified for the final tournament.

Note: All appearance statistics count only those since the introduction of final tournament in 1991.

Team	Appearance	Previous best performance
Niger (hosts)	1st	Debut
Burkina Faso	3rd	Fourth place (2003)
Burundi	2nd	Runners-up (1995)
Ghana	11th	Champions (1993, 1999, 2009)
Mali	12th	Third place (2003)
Nigeria	11th	Champions (2005, 2011, 2015)
Senegal	5th	Runners-up (2015, 2017)
South Africa	8th	Runners-up (1997)

== Venues ==
The matches were played in two venues:

Niamey	2019 U-20 Africa Cup of Nations is located in Niger	Maradi
Stade Général Seyni Kountché	2019 U-20 Africa Cup of Nations is located in Niger	Stade de Maradi
Capacity: 35,000	2019 U-20 Africa Cup of Nations is located in Niger	Capacity: 15,000

== Squads ==
Each squad can contain a maximum of 21 players.

== Draw ==
The draw of the final tournament was held on 13 December 2018, 21:00 WAT (UTC+1), at the Centre Technique de La Fenifoot in Niamey. The eight teams were drawn into two groups of four teams. The hosts Niger were seeded in Group A and allocated to position A1, while 2017 runners-up Senegal were seeded in Group B and allocated to position B1 (2017 champions Zambia did not qualify). The remaining six teams were seeded based on their results in the 2017 Africa U-20 Cup of Nations (final tournament and qualifiers), and drawn to any of the remaining three positions in each group.

Seeded	Pot 1	Pot 2
Niger (hosts); Senegal (2017 runners-up)	South Africa; Mali	Ghana; Nigeria; Burkina Faso; Burundi

== Match officials ==
A total of 12 referees and 12 assistant referees were appointed for the tournament.

Referees

- Pacifique Ndabihawenimana (Burundi)
- Antoine Effa (Cameroon)
- Souleiman Ahmed Djama (Djibouti)
- Amin Mohamed Amin Mohamed Omar (Egypt)
- Peter Waweru (Kenya)
- Boubou Traoré (Mali)
- Imtehaz Heeralall (Mauritius)
- Ali Mohamed Moussa (Niger)
- Jean Claude Ishimwe (Rwanda)
- Hassan Mohamed Hagi (Somalia)
- Kokou Ntalé (Togo)
- Haythem Guirat (Tunisia)

Assistant Referees

- Abdoulaziz Yacouba (Niger)
- (Central African Republic) Jospin Luckner Malonga (Central African Republic)
- Samir Gamal Saad Mohamed (Egypt)
- Firmino Bassafim (Guinea-Bissau)
- Lionel Hasinjarasoa (Madagascar)
- Fabien Cauvelet (Mauritius)
- Mustapha Akerkad (Morocco)
- Mathew Kanyanga (Namibia)
- Abdoul Aziz Moctar Saley (Niger)
- Hamza Hagi Abdi (Somalia)
- Dick Okello (Uganda)
- Samuel Temesgin Atango (Ethiopia)

== Group stage ==
The top two teams of each group advance to the semi-finals and qualify for the 2019 FIFA U-20 World Cup.

Tiebreakers

Teams are ranked according to points (3 points for a win, 1 point for a draw, 0 points for a loss), and if tied on points, the following tiebreaking criteria are applied, in the order given, to determine the rankings (Regulations Article 71):

1. Points in head-to-head matches among tied teams;
2. Goal difference in head-to-head matches among tied teams;
3. Goals scored in head-to-head matches among tied teams;
4. If more than two teams are tied, and after applying all head-to-head criteria above, a subset of teams are still tied, all head-to-head criteria above are reapplied exclusively to this subset of teams;
5. Goal difference in all group matches;
6. Goals scored in all group matches;
7. Drawing of lots.

All times are local, WAT (UTC+1).

=== Group A ===
Pos	Team	Pld	W	D	L	GF	GA	GD	Pts	Qualification
1	Nigeria	3	2	1	0	3	0	+3	7	Knockout stage and 2019 FIFA U-20 World Cup
2	South Africa	3	1	2	0	2	1	+1	5	Knockout stage and 2019 FIFA U-20 World Cup
3	Niger (H)	3	0	2	1	4	5	−1	2	
4	Burundi	3	0	1	2	3	6	−3	1	

Source: CAF
Rules for classification: Group stage tiebreakers
(H) Hosts
2 February 2019
16:30

Niger	1–1	South Africa
Goumey 63'	Report	Mkhize 70'

Stade Général Seyni Kountché, Niamey
Referee: Ahmad Imtehaz Heeralall (Mauritius)
2 February 2019
19:30

Nigeria	2–0	Burundi
Yahaya 55'; Effiom 71'	Report

Stade Général Seyni Kountché, Niamey
Referee: Antoine Max Depadoux Effa Essouma (Cameroon)

5 February 2019
16:30

South Africa	0–0	Nigeria
	Report

Stade Général Seyni Kountché, Niamey
Referee: Peter Waweru (Kenya)
5 February 2019
19:30

Burundi	3–3	Niger
Irakoze 45' (pen.); Ulimwengu 73'; Kanakimana 75'	Report	Salou 18' (pen.); Amoustapha 42'; Sabo 56'

Stade Général Seyni Kountché, Niamey
Referee: Amin Mohamed Amin Mohamed Omar (Egypt)

8 February 2019
16:30

Niger	0–1	Nigeria
	Report	Alhassan 73'

Stade Général Seyni Kountché, Niamey
Referee: Boubou Traore (Mali)
8 February 2019
16:30

South Africa	1–0	Burundi
Le Roux 9' (pen.)	Report

Stade de Maradi, Maradi
Referee: Haythem Guirat (Tunisia)

=== Group B ===
Pos	Team	Pld	W	D	L	GF	GA	GD	Pts	Qualification
1	Senegal	3	3	0	0	9	1	+8	9	Knockout stage and 2019 FIFA U-20 World Cup
2	Mali	3	2	0	1	2	2	0	6	Knockout stage and 2019 FIFA U-20 World Cup
3	Ghana	3	1	0	2	2	3	−1	3	
4	Burkina Faso	3	0	0	3	1	8	−7	0	

Source: CAF
Rules for classification: Group stage tiebreakers
3 February 2019
16:30

Senegal	2–0	Mali
Lopy 71'; Ndaw 90'	Report

Stade de Maradi, Maradi
Referee: Haythem Guirat (Tunisia)
4 February 2019 (Note: The Burkina Faso v Ghana match was originally scheduled for 3 February 2019, 19:30 local time, but was postponed to the following day due to mechanical issues for floodlights visual and weather. The Mali v Burkina Faso and Ghana and Senegal matches on 6 February 2019 were also brought forward from 16:30 and 19:30 to 13:30 and 16:30 for the same reason.)
16:30

Burkina Faso	0–2	Ghana
	Report	Lomotey 41', 77'

Stade de Maradi, Maradi
Referee: Mohamed Ali Moussa (Niger)

6 February 2019
13:30

Mali	1–0	Burkina Faso
M. Traoré 52'	Report

Stade de Maradi, Maradi
Referee: Souleiman Ahmed Djamal (Djibouti)
6 February 2019
16:30

Ghana	0–2	Senegal
	Report	Badji 11', 45'

Stade de Maradi, Maradi
Referee: Jean Claude Ishimwe (Rwanda)

9 February 2019
16:30

Senegal	5–1	Burkina Faso
A. N'Diaye 8', 42'; Diallo 35'; Badji 50'; Niang 90+3'	Report	Tapsoba 34'

Stade de Maradi, Maradi
Referee: Hassan Mohamed Hagi (Somalia)
9 February 2019
16:30

Mali	1–0	Ghana
Dramé 53'	Report

Stade Général Seyni Kountché, Niamey
Referee: Pacifique Ndabihawenimana (Burundi)

== Knockout stage ==
In the knockout stage, extra time and penalty shoot-out are used to decide the winner if necessary, except for the third place match where penalty shoot-out (no extra time) is used to decide the winner if necessary (Regulations Article 72).

=== Bracket ===
Semi-finals
13 February – Niamey
Nigeria	1 (3)
Mali	1 (4)
13 February – Niamey
Senegal	1
South Africa	0

Final
17 February – Niamey
Mali	1 (3)
Senegal	1 (2)
Third place match
16 February – Niamey
Nigeria	0 (3)
South Africa	0 (5)

=== Semi-finals ===
13 February 2019
16:30

Nigeria	1–1 (a.e.t.)	Mali
Durugbor 86'	Report	M. Traoré 78'
Penalties
Ozornwafor (penalty missed); Udo (penalty scored); Muhammad (penalty scored); Effiom (penalty scored); Okon (penalty missed)	3–4	(penalty missed) B. Traoré; (penalty scored) L. N'Diaye; (penalty scored) Dramé; (penalty scored) Diaby; (penalty scored) Touré

Stade Général Seyni Kountché, Niamey
Referee: Amin Mohamed Amin Mohamed Omar (Egypt)

13 February 2019
19:30

Senegal	1–0	South Africa
Khupe 70' (o.g.)	Report

Stade Général Seyni Kountché, Niamey
Referee: Pacifique Ndabihawenimana (Burundi)

=== Third place match ===
16 February 2019
16:30

Nigeria	0–0	South Africa
	Report
Penalties
Alhassan (penalty missed); Muhammad (penalty scored); Zaruma (penalty scored); Effiom (penalty scored)	3–5	(penalty scored) Khupe; (penalty scored) Le Roux; (penalty scored) Ncamani; (penalty scored) Modise; (penalty scored) Mkhize

Stade Général Seyni Kountché, Niamey
Referee: Mohamed Ali Moussa (Niger)

=== Final ===
17 February 2019
16:30

Mali	1–1 (a.e.t.)	Senegal
B. Traoré 16'	Report	A. N'Diaye 75'
Penalties
B. Traoré (penalty scored); L. N'Diaye (penalty scored); Diaby (penalty scored); Samaké (penalty missed)	3–2	(penalty missed) Lopy; (penalty scored) Mendy; (penalty scored) Diack; (penalty missed) A. N'Diaye; (penalty missed) Niang

Stade Général Seyni Kountché, Niamey
Referee: Haythem Guirat (Tunisia)

== Winners ==
2019 Africa U-20 Cup of Nations

Mali
First title

== Goalscorers ==
3 goals

- (Senegal) Youssouph Mamadou Badji
- (Senegal) Amadou Dia N'Diaye

2 goals

- (Ghana) Daniel Lomotey
- (Mali) Mamadou Traoré

1 goal

- (Burkina Faso) Abdoul Tapsoba
- (Burundi) Saidi Irakoze
- (Burundi) Bienvenue Kanakimana
- (Burundi) Jules Ulimwengu
- (Mali) Boubacar Traoré
- (Mali) Hadji Dramé
- (Niger) Kairou Amoustapha
- (Niger) Boubacar Goumey
- (Niger) Mahamadou Sabo
- (Niger) Issah Salou
- (Nigeria) Ibrahim Alhassan
- (Nigeria) Paschal Durugbor
- (Nigeria) Maxwell Effiom
- (Nigeria) Nazifi Yahaya
- (Senegal) Samba Diallo
- (Senegal) Dion Lopy
- (Senegal) Faly Ndaw
- (Senegal) Ousseynou Niang
- (South Africa) Luke Le Roux
- (South Africa) Siphesihle Mkhize

1 own goal

- (South Africa) Givemore Khupe (against Senegal)

== Awards ==
Top scorer

- (Senegal) Amadou Dia N'Diaye

Player of the tournament

- (Senegal) Moussa N'Diaye

Fair Play Award

- Senegal

== Qualified teams for FIFA U-20 World Cup ==
The following four teams from CAF qualified for the 2019 FIFA U-20 World Cup.

Team	Qualified on	Previous appearances in FIFA U-20 World Cup^{1}
Senegal	6 February 2019	2 (2015, 2017)
Nigeria	8 February 2019	11 (1983, 1985, 1987, 1989, 1999, 2005, 2007, 2009, 2011, 2013, 2015)
South Africa	8 February 2019	3 (1997, 2009, 2017)
Mali	9 February 2019	6 (1989, 1999, 2003, 2011, 2013, 2015)

^{1} Bold indicates champions for that year. Italic indicates hosts for that year.
