= Enock Atta Agyei =

Ghanaian professional footballer

Personal information
- Date of birth: 5 January 1999 (age 27)
- Place of birth: Buduburam, Ghana
- Positions: Winger; forward

Team information
- Current team: Horoya
- Number: 10

Senior career*
Years	Team	Apps	(Gls)
2014–2015	Windy Professionals	29	(17)
2016	Medeama	16	(2)
2016–2019	Azam	-	(-)
2019–	Horoya	-	(-)

International career
- Ghana U17
2019	Ghana U20	5	(0)
- * Club domestic league appearances and goals as of 7 July 2021

Enoch Atta Agyei (born 5 January 1999) is a Ghanaian footballer who plays as a winger for Horoya AC. Agyei started his career playing for Windy Professionals, he was one the highly rated youngsters on the local scene, winning the most promising player of the Division One League after scoring 17 goals in 29 appearances. He joined Medeama for a season, before joining Tanzanian club Azam. After three seasons he joined Horoya, where he won the league in his debut season, following it up with another league title the following season.

== Club career ==
=== Windy Professionals and Medeama ===
Agyei started his career with Windy Professionals then in the Ghana Division One League. He scored 17 goals in 29 league appearances during the 2015 season. He put up an impressive individual performance however Windy Professionals were unfortunately relegated to the Division Two League. He was adjudged the most promising player at the end of the season. His performances in the league attracted suitors from the Ghana Premier Leagaue, especially Medeama, the reigning FA Cup champions. He was handed a trial with the club and after impressing head coach Tom Strand, he was signed on a permanent deal in November 2015. During the 2016 Ghana Premier League season, he played 16 league matches and scored 2 goals along with winning the Ghana Super Cup after scoring the league champions Ashanti Gold.

=== Azam ===
He later moved to Tanzanian club Azam FC in November 2016. He however had to wait for over a year to make his debut after he was denied the opportunity to play due his pending paperwork. He joined the team to form a formidable defense alongside compatriot Razak Abalora.

=== Horoya ===
In June 2019, he joined Guinean top club Horoya AC. He signed a five-year contract with the side after spending three seasons playing in the Tanzanian Premier League. Upon his move to the club, he joined compatriot Patrick Razak. In December 2019, he was named on the CAF Confederation Cup team of the week after putting in an impressive showdown to help Horoya AC overcome Djoliba AC with a 1–0 win in the group stages. He had four successful dribbles from five attempts along with placing second best in passing accuracy with an 87% succession rate.

== International career ==
After putting up impressive performances at Azam, he was given his first call up to the Ghana U20 national team in 2019 during the 2019 Africa U-20 Cup of Nations qualifiers, helping Ghana to qualification ultimately for the competition 2019 Africa U-20 Cup of Nations. He was named on the team's squad for the competition. During the competition he made three appearances as his side were eliminated in the group stages.

== Personal life ==
In May 2019, Agyei made donated football equipment to his former club Windy Professionals (Winneba Sports College) as part of his philanthropic projects and social responsibility to motivate the youngsters and team members.

== Honours ==
=== Club ===
Medeama

- Ghana Super Cup: 2016

Azam

- Kagame Interclub Cup: 2018

Horoya

- Guinée Championnat National: 2019–20, 2020–21

=== Individual ===
- Division One League Most Promising Player: 2015
