= Kennedy Ugoala Nwanganga =

Nigerian footballer

Kennedy Nwanganga
Personal information
- Full name: Kennedy Ugoala Nwanganga
- Date of birth: 15 August 1990 (age 36)
- Place of birth: Aba, Abia, Nigeria
- Height: 1.88 m (6 ft 2 in)
- Positions: Striker; winger

Team information
- Current team: Beringen

Youth career
- Enyimba International F.C.
- Heartland F.C.

Senior career*
Years	Team	Apps	(Gls)
2007–2008	NAF Rockets FC		
2009–2010	Inter Turku	43	(9)
2010–2014	Genk	15	(3)
2013	→ Beerschot (loan)	7	(0)
2013–2014	→ Westerlo (loan)	12	(1)
2014–2015	Roeselare	17	(4)
2016–2017	Inter Turku	28	(4)
2017–	Dinamo Batumi	2	(0)
2017	Kamza		
2019	ASV Geel		
2019–	Beringen		
- * Club domestic league appearances and goals as of 31 March 2017

Kennedy Ugoala Nwanganga (born 15 August 1990) is a Nigerian footballer, who is currently playing for Beringen.

== Career ==
The Veikkausliiga champions FC Inter Turku have signed Nwanganga, from NAF Rockets FC. In the 2010 season he was his team's second best goalscorer with 7 goals (four behind Henri Lehtonen).

On 14 November 2010, he signed a three-and-a-half-year contract with K.R.C. Genk.

In that half season he got a few chances and eventually clinched the championship for Genk with an equalising header against Standard in the final game of the 2010-11 playoff.

On 4 April 2016, Nwanganga signed a one-year contract with FC Inter Turku.

== Honours ==
- Belgian Pro League: 2010–11
- Belgian Super Cup: 2011
