= Lee Kyu-hyuk =

Lee Kyu-hyuk may refer to:

- Lee Kyou-hyuk, South Korean speed skater
- Lee Kyu-hyuk (footballer)
