= Lawrence Iquaibom =

Nigerian weightlifter

Medal record

Men's Weightlifting

Representing Nigeria

Commonwealth Games
Silver medal – second place	1990 Snatch Lightweight	130 kg
Silver medal – second place	1990 Clean and jerk Lightweight	160 kg
Silver medal – second place	1990 Overall Lightweight	290 kg

Lawrence Iquaibom (born 5 February 1965) is a Nigerian former weightlifter. He is now a weightlifting official and coach.

Lawrence Iquaibom grew up in the state of Akwa Ibom. After ending his active career as a weightlifter he became an official coach of the weightlifting association of the state of Akwa Ibom as well as technical director of the Nigerian weightlifting association.

He competed in weightlifting at the 1984 Summer Olympics in Los Angeles and the 1988 Summer Olympics in Seoul. In 1984 he competed in the Men's Featherweight and became 14th of 21 competitors with 107.5 kg in Snatch and 130 kg in Clean and jerk, in 1988 he competed in the Men's Lightweight and became 12th of 29 competitors with 125 kg in Snatch and 160 kg in Clean and jerk. Hew won the weightlifting competition in the category until 60 kg at the 1987 All-Africa Games in Nairobi with a total of 245.0 kg. At the 1990 Commonwealth Games in Auckland he competed in the Men's Lightweight and won silver medals for 130 kg in Snatch, 160 kg in Clean and jerk and 290 kg overall.

He is chairman and former coach of Ibom Youths F.C., a football club that plays in the Nigeria National League.
