= Chancel Ndaye =

Burundian footballer

Personal information
- Date of birth: 14 April 1999 (age 27)
- Place of birth: Bujumbura, Burundi
- Height: 1.80 m (5 ft 11 in)
- Position: Defender

Team information
- Current team: AS Vita Club

Youth career
- LLB Académic

Senior career*
| Years | Team | Apps | (Gls) |
| 2016–2019 | LLB Académic | | |
| 2019–2020 | MFK Vyškov | 4 | (0) |
| 2020 | → Las Vegas Lights (loan) | 1 | (0) |
| 2023–2024 | Bumamuru FC | | |
| 2024– | AS Vita Club | | |

International career^{‡}
| 2019– | Burundi U20 | 3 | (0) |
| 2017– | Burundi | 2 | (0) |
- * Club domestic league appearances and goals as of October 4, 2020 ‡ National team caps and goals as of December 21, 2019

Chancel Ndaye (born 14 April 1999) is a Burundian footballer who currently plays as a defender.

== Career ==
He grew up in the youth sector of the LLB Académic, in February 2019 he moved to Europe signing with the Czechs of Vyškov.

On 20 December 2019 of the same year he made a permanent move to the Las Vegas Lights.

He represented the national under-20 team at the 2019 Africa U-20 Cup of Nations.
