= Ibom Youths F.C. =

Football club in Nigeria

Ibom Youths FC
- Full name: Ibom Youths Football Club
- Founded: 2016; 10 years ago
- Ground: Ikot Ekpene Stadium
- Chairman: Lawrence Iquaibom
- Manager: Emmanuel Ntuk
- League: Nigeria Nationwide League

Ibom Youths FC is a professional football club based in Ikot Ekpene, Akwa Ibom State, Nigeria. The club played in the Nigeria National League until May 2023 when they relegated to Nigeria Nationwide League.

== History ==
The club was founded in 2016 by the Akwa Ibom State Government.

== Stadium ==
The Uyo Township Stadium is home to the Ibom Youths FC team.

== Current squad ==
As of February 2022, the club unveiled some new players who will feature in the ahead of the 2021/2022 season. Among them includes;

- David Essien
- Nsikak Moses
- Salami Damilola
- Mbuotidem Charles
- Franklin Chinedu
- Alexander Momoh
- Chibuzor Onyido
- Edidiong George
- Pius James
- Ekemini James
- Hosanna Uyoh
- Goodnews Paul
- Iniobong Bassey
- Udeme Markson
- Dauda Umar
- Bassey Edet
- William William

== Former notable players ==
- Ezekiel Edidiong
