= Daniel Lomotey =

Ghanaian footballer (born 1999)

Personal information
- Full name: Daniel Agbloe Adzigodi Lomotey
- Date of birth: 16 August 1999 (age 27)
- Place of birth: Ghana
- Height: 1.77 m (5 ft 10 in)
- Position: Forward

Senior career*
Years	Team	Apps	(Gls)
2017–2021	WAFA	39	(18)
2021–2022	ES Sétif	9	(2)
2023–2024	Medeama	19	(1)
2024–2025	Young Apostles	16	(2)
2025–2026	Eleven Wonders	12	(2)
2026–2027	Nations	1	(1)

International career
2019	Ghana U20	3	(2)
- * Club domestic league appearances and goals

Daniel Agbloe Adzigodi Lomotey (born 16 August 1999) is a Ghanaian footballer who plays as a forward.

== Club career ==
=== WAFA ===
Lomotey began his senior career with WAFA, establishing himself in the first team during the 2017 Ghanaian Premier League season. In April 2017, he scored twice in a 2–1 away victory over Elmina Sharks, helping WAFA maintain their position at the top of the league table. His performances that month, during which he scored four goals and provided five assists, earned him a nomination for the NASCO Player of the Month award.

Lomotey enjoyed a prolific start to the 2020–21 Ghana Premier League season. On 3 January 2021, he scored four goals as WAFA defeated Medeama 5–4 in Sogakope, becoming the first player to score four goals in a match during the season. He left WAFA later that month having scored eight goals in nine league appearances during the campaign.

=== ES Sétif ===
In January 2021, Lomotey joined Algerian club ES Sétif on a three-year contract after his proposed move to Tunisian side AS Soliman fell through. He joined Sétif after scoring eight goals in nine league appearances for WAFA and was the joint-leading scorer in the Ghana Premier League at the time of his departure.

Lomotey scored his first Algerian league goal on 9 August 2021, coming off the bench and scoring shortly afterwards in a 4–0 victory over US Biskra. The result secured Sétif qualification for the 2021–22 CAF Champions League. He remained with the club during the 2021–22 season and featured in the CAF Champions League before leaving Sétif in 2022.

=== Medeama ===
In August 2023, Lomotey joined reigning Ghana Premier League champions Medeama on a two-year contract following his departure from ES Sétif.

He scored on his league debut for the club, coming off the bench to equalise in a 2–2 draw against Accra Lions in September 2023.

Lomotey also featured for Medeama in the 2023–24 CAF Champions League. On 1 December 2023, he scored the equaliser in a 2–1 group-stage victory over Algerian club CR Belouizdad, with Kamaradini Mamudu scoring the winning goal in stoppage time.

=== Later Career ===
In August 2024, Lomotey joined newly promoted Young Apostles on a free transfer following his departure from Medeama.

On 22 September 2024, he scored his first league goal for the club in a 1–1 draw against Asante Kotoko at the Len Clay Stadium. He later scored the only goal in a 1–0 victory over Dreams FC on 27 October. In August 2025, Lomotey joined Eleven Wonders ahead of the 2025–26 Ghana Premier League season. On 16 November 2025, he scored against his former club Medeama in a 2–1 league defeat at the Ohene Ameyaw Park.

== International career ==
Lomotey represented Ghana U20 at the 2019 Africa U-20 Cup of Nations in Niger. He was named in Ghana's 21-man squad for the tournament and started their opening group match against Burkina Faso. Lomotey scored both goals in a 2–0 victory, finding the net in the 41st and 77th minutes. He featured in all three of Ghana's matches at the tournament, finishing with two goals as Ghana were eliminated in the group stage.

Later in February 2019, Lomotey was called up to the Ghana national under-23 football team ahead of the country's Africa U-23 Cup of Nations qualifying matches against Gabon.
