= NAF Rockets F.C. =

Nigerian football club

NAF Rockets
- Full name: Nigerian Air Force Football Club
- Nickname: Rockets
- Ground: Old Parade Ground/Aguiyi Ironsi Barracks; Abuja, Nigeria
- Capacity: 5,000/unknown
- Chairman: Group Captain Patrick Akosubo
- League: Nigeria National League
Home colours	Away colours

NAF Rockets is a Nigerian football club based in Abuja that is sponsored by the Nigerian Air Force. They play in the second-tier division in Nigerian football, the Nigeria National League.

The team is mixed with both civilian and military personnel on the roster. They were banished to Lafia for the last games of the 2009 season after a pitch invasion against Kwara United and then relegated after finishing last in the division. After two years in the third tier, they were promoted for the 2012 season

== Current squad ==
Note: Flags indicate national team as defined under FIFA eligibility rules; some limited exceptions apply. Players may hold more than one non-FIFA nationality.

No.	Pos.	Nation	Player
—			
