= Stade de Maradi =

Sports venue in Maradi, Niger

- Interactive map of Stade de Maradi
- Location: Maradi, Niger
- Coordinates: 13°30′13″N 7°5′51″E
- Capacity: 10,000

Tenant

Stade de Maradi is a multi-purpose stadium in Maradi, Niger.

== Use ==
It is used mostly for football matches and serves as the home venue for Jangorzo FC.

== Capacity ==
The stadium holds 10,000 people.
