= José García (footballer, born 2000) =

Honduran footballer (born 2000)

Personal information
- Full name: José Omar Garcìa Marín
- Date of birth: 28 February 2000 (age 26)
- Place of birth: Tela, Honduras
- Height: 1.91 m (6 ft 3 in)
- Position: Goalkeeper

Team information
- Current team: Real Sociedad

Youth career
- Real España

Senior career*
Years	Team	Apps	(Gls)
2019–2021	Real España		
2021–2023	Honduras Progreso	1	(0)
2023–	Real Sociedad		

International career
2019	Honduras U20	3	(0)
- * Club domestic league appearances and goals

José Omar García Marín (born 28 February 2000) is a Honduran professional footballer who plays as a goalkeeper for Real Sociedad.

== International career ==
He received a call up to the 2019 U20 FIFA World Cup and The final squad was announced . He played all the games in the group stage for Honduras.
