= Keenan Abrahams =

South African footballer (born 1999)

Personal information
- Full name: Keenan Abrahams
- Date of birth: 1999 (age 26–27)
- Place of birth: Cape Town, South Africa
- Height: 1.80 m (5 ft 11 in)
- Position: Defender

Team information
- Current team: Steenberg United
- Number: 31

Senior career*
| Years | Team | Apps | (Gls) |
| 2018–2020 | Ajax Cape Town | 3 | (0) |
| 2020– | Steenberg United | 12 | (0) |

International career^{‡}
| 2019– | South Africa U20 | 5 | (0) |
- * Club domestic league appearances and goals as of 10:30, 17 January 2021 (UTC) ‡ National team caps and goals as of 20:36, 30 June 2019 (UTC)

Keenan Abrahams (born 1999) is a South African soccer player who plays as a defender for Steenberg United.

== Career statistics ==
As of 17 January 2021

Appearances and goals by club, season and competition
| Club | Season | League | | | National Cup | | League Cup | | Other | | Total | |
| Club | Season | Division | Apps | Goals | Apps | Goals | Apps | Goals | Apps | Goals | Apps | Goals |
|---|---|---|---|---|---|---|---|---|---|---|---|---|
| Ajax Cape Town | 2018–19 | National First Division | 2 | 0 | 0 | 0 | 0 | 0 | 0 | 0 | 2 | 0 |
| Ajax Cape Town | 2019–20 | National First Division | 1 | 0 | 0 | 0 | 0 | 0 | 0 | 0 | 1 | 0 |
| Ajax Cape Town | 2020–21 | National First Division | 0 | 0 | 0 | 0 | 0 | 0 | 0 | 0 | 0 | 0 |
| Total | | | 3 | 0 | 0 | 0 | 0 | 0 | 0 | 0 | 3 | 0 |
