= Lee Kyu-hyuk (footballer) =

Korean association football player

Personal information
- Date of birth: 4 May 1999 (age 27)
- Place of birth: South Korea
- Height: 1.75 m (5 ft 9 in)
- Position: Defender

Team information
- Current team: Jeonnam Dragons
- Number: 66

Youth career
- –2018: Dongguk University

Senior career*
| Years | Team | Apps | (Gls) |
| 2019–2021 | Jeju United | 15 | (0) |
| 2021 | → Chungnam Asan (loan) | 11 | (0) |
| 2022– | Jeonnam Dragons | 33 | (1) |

International career^{‡}
| 2014–2016 | South Korea U17 | 9 | (1) |
| 2017–2019 | South Korea U20 | 15 | (0) |
| 2021– | South Korea U23 | 6 | (1) |
- * Club domestic league appearances and goals as of 14:18, 20 February 2022 (UTC) ‡ National team caps and goals as of 14:18, 8 June 2022 (UTC)

- Lee Kyu-hyuk
- Hangul: 이규혁
- RR: I Gyuhyeok
- MR: I Kyuhyŏk

Lee Kyu-hyuk (Korean: 이규혁; born 4 May 1999) is a South Korean footballer currently playing as a defender for the Jeonnam Dragons.

== Career statistics ==
=== Club ===
As of 20 February 2022.

| Club | Season | League | | | FA Cup | | Other | | Total | |
| Club | Season | Division | Apps | Goals | Apps | Goals | Apps | Goals | Apps | Goals |
|---|---|---|---|---|---|---|---|---|---|---|
| Jeju United | 2019 | K League 1 | 0 | 0 | 1 | 0 | 0 | 0 | 1 | 0 |
| Jeju United | 2020 | K League 2 | 6 | 0 | 0 | 0 | 0 | 0 | 6 | 0 |
| Jeju United | 2021 | K League 1 | 9 | 0 | 0 | 0 | 0 | 0 | 9 | 0 |
| Chungnam Asan (loan) | 2021 | K League 2 | 11 | 0 | 0 | 0 | 0 | 0 | 11 | 0 |
| Jeonnam Dragons | 2022 | K League 2 | 1 | 0 | 0 | 0 | 0 | 0 | 1 | 0 |
| Career total | | | 27 | 0 | 1 | 0 | 0 | 0 | 28 | 0 |
