= Issah Salou =

Nigerien footballer

Personal information
- Full name: Issah Abdoulaye Salou
- Date of birth: 4 February 1999 (age 27)
- Height: 1.76 m (5 ft 9 in)

Youth career
- –2019: Sporting Club Accra

Senior career*
Years	Team	Apps	(Gls)
2019–2022	Randers	1	(0)
2021	→ Jammerbugt (loan)	16	(0)
2022–2024	Skive	57	(0)
2024–2025	Ishøj	7	(0)

International career
2019	Niger U20		
2020–	Niger	4	(1)
- * Club domestic league appearances and goals as of 14:57, 31 May 2025 (UTC)

Issah Abdoulaye Salou (born 4 February 1999) is a Nigerien professional footballer who plays as a central midfielder and also as a winger.

== Career ==
Salou joined the youth academy of Ghanaian side Sporting Club Accra.

In 2019, he signed for Randers in the Danish Superliga. During February 2021 he signed a deal for the rest of the season with Danish 2nd Division club Jammerbugt FC.

On 1 February 2022, Salou signed with Danish 2nd Division club Skive IK. He left in the summer 2024. On August 3, 2024, Salou was suddenly on the roster of newly promoted Danish 2nd Division side Ishøj IF, without any further official announcement about the transfer.
