= Aniekeme Okon =

Nigerian footballer

Personal information
- Full name: Aniekeme Asuquo Okon
- Date of birth: 5 August 1999 (age 27)
- Place of birth: Anua, Uyo, Akwa Ibom, Nigeria
- Height: 1.64 m (5 ft 5 in)
- Positions: Forward; midfielder

Team information
- Current team: Rivers United
- Number: 11

Youth career
- Greater Tomorrow Academy
- Ibom Youths
- 2016–2018: Akwa Starlets
- 2016: → Delta Force (loan)

Senior career*
Years	Team	Apps	(Gls)
2018–2020	Akwa United	28	(0)
2020	Altay	0	(0)
2020–2021	Kano Pillars	14	(0)
2021–2022	One Rocket	0	(0)
2021–2022	→ Kano Pillars (loan)	17	(0)
2022–2024	Remo Stars	31	(5)
2024–	Rivers United	62	(8)

International career
2019	Nigeria U20	7	(0)
- * Club domestic league appearances and goals as of 19:01, 21 November 2021 (UTC)

Aniekeme Asuquo Okon (born 5 August 1999) is a Nigerian footballer who plays as a forward for Rivers United.

== Club career ==
Okon started his career at the Greater Tomorrow Academy, before representing Ibom Youths and Akwa Starlets. He later joined Akwa United. Following his performances at the 2019 FIFA U-20 World Cup for Nigeria, Okon was linked with a move to United States club D.C. United, though Akwa United chairman Paul Bassey dispelled these links, stating "Okon is our player. Nobody has spoken to me." However, in May 2020, he left Akwa for Turkish TFF 1. Lig club Altay, signing a two-and-a-half year deal.

Having returned to Nigeria the same year without making an appearance for Altay, Okon spent time with Kano Pillars, also registering with lower-league club One Rocket, before a move to Remo Stars in August 2022. Okon helped the club to qualify for the CAF Champions League for the first time in their history, but could not prevent his team from losing on penalties to Ghanaian club Medeama in the first round. After scoring against former club Akwa United in Remo Stars' 3–2 loss on 19 November 2023, Okon notably did not celebrate, stating that doing so "would have been disrespectful."

In July 2024, after two years with Remo Stars, Okon joined fellow NPSL club Rivers United. Later in the same year, his performances drew the attention of English EFL League One club Wigan Athletic. In contrast to his actions in not celebrating a goal against his former club Akwa United, Okon did celebrate when scoring for Rivers United against Remo Stars on 22 August 2025 in their 1–1 draw. After the game he stated that he did not initially want to celebrate, but given it was the first goal of the season, he chose to celebrate as he was "part of that history."

== International career ==
Okon has represented Nigeria at under-20 level, featuring at the 2019 FIFA U-20 World Cup.

== Career statistics ==
=== Club ===
As of 5 July 2026.

Appearances and goals by club, season and competition
Club	Season	League			Cup		Continental		Other		Total	
Club	Season	Division	Apps	Goals	Apps	Goals	Apps	Goals	Apps	Goals	Apps	Goals
Akwa United	2018	NPFL	16	0	–		4 (Note: Appearances in the CAF Confederation Cup)	1	0	0	20	1
Akwa United	2019	NPFL	1	0	–		–		0	0	1	0
Akwa United	2019–20	NPFL	11	0	0	0	0	0	0	0	11	0
Akwa United	Total		28	0	0	0	4	1	0	0	32	1
Altay	2019–20	TFF 1. Lig	0	0	0	0	–		0	0	0	0
Kano Pillars	2020–21	NPFL	14	0	–		0	0	0	0	14	0
Kano Pillars (loan)	2021–22	NPFL	17	0	–		–		0	0	17	0
Kano Pillars (loan)	Total		31	0	0	0	0	0	0	0	31	0
Remo Stars	2022–23	NPFL	7	1	–		2	0	4 (Note: Appearances in the NPFL playoffs)	0	13	1
Remo Stars	2023–24	NPFL	24	4	–		1 (Note: Appearances in the CAF Champions League)	0	0	0	25	4
Remo Stars	Total		31	5	0	0	3	0	0	0	34	5
Rivers United	2024–25	NPFL	31	3	–		–		0	0	31	3
Rivers United	2025–26	NPFL	31	5	–		8	0	0	0	39	5
Rivers United	Total		62	8	0	0	8	0	0	0	70	8
Career total			152	13	0	0	13	1	4	0	169	14
