= Malebogo Modise =

South African professional soccer player

Personal information
- Full name: Gadinkame Malebogo Modise
- Date of birth: 6 February 1999 (age 27)
- Place of birth: Mahikeng, South Africa
- Height: 1.79 m (5 ft 10 in)
- Positions: Left-back; left midfielder

Team information
- Current team: Chippa United (on loan from Mamelodi Sundowns)
- Number: 27

Youth career
- –2018: Mamelodi Sundowns

Senior career*
Years	Team	Apps	(Gls)
2018–	Mamelodi Sundowns	0	(0)
2018–2020	→ M Tigers (loan)		
2020–2021	→ Maritzburg United (loan)	10	(0)
2021–2022	→ JDR Stars (loan)	27	(6)
2022–2023	→ All Stars (loan)	24	(0)
2023–	→ Chippa United (loan)	10	(0)

International career^{‡}
	South Africa U17	10	
- South Africa U20
- * Club domestic league appearances and goals as of 1 April 2024 ‡ National team caps and goals as of 15:18, 28 February 2021 (UTC)

Gadinkame Malebogo Modise (born 6 February 1999) is a South African professional soccer player who plays as a left-back or left midfielder for Chippa United, on loan from Mamelodi Sundowns. Modise has played internationally for South Africa at under-17 and under-20 levels.

== Club career ==
Modise was born in Mahikeng but moved to in order to join the academy of Mamelodi Sundowns. Having previously has a spell on loan at M Tigers between 2018 and 2020, he was promoted to the Sundowns senior squad in summer 2020. He joined Maritzburg United on loan for the 2020–21 season in October 2020.

== International career ==
Modise has made 10 appearances for the South Africa national under-17 team and has also represented South Africa at under-20 level.

== Style of play ==
Modise can play as a left-back or as a left midfielder, earning him the nickname 'Bale', after Gareth Bale.
