= Givemore Khupe =

South African footballer

Personal information
- Full name: Givemore Khupe
- Date of birth: 20 December 1999 (age 26)
- Height: 1.83 m (6 ft 0 in)
- Position: [[Defender (association football)|Defensive Midfielder

Team information
- Current team: Upington City

Youth career
- Bidvest Wits

Senior career*
Years	Team	Apps	(Gls)
2018–2019	Bidvest Wits	0	(0)
2018–2019	→ Cape Umoya United (loan)	12	(0)
2019–2024	Moroka Swallows	55	(3)
2024–	Upington City	10	(0)

International career^{‡}
2019–	South Africa U20	7	(0)
- * Club domestic league appearances and goals as of 14 November 2024 ‡ National team caps and goals as of 30 June 2019

Givemore Khupe (born 20 December 1999) is a South African soccer player who currently plays as a Defensive midfielder for Upington City.

== Career statistics ==
=== Club ===
As of 30 June 2019.

Club	Season	League			National Cup		League Cup		Continental		Other		Total	
Club	Season	Division	Apps	Goals	Apps	Goals	Apps	Goals	Apps	Goals	Apps	Goals	Apps	Goals
Bidvest Wits	2018–19	ABSA Premiership	0	0	0	0	0	0	0	0	0	0	0	0
Cape Umoya United (loan)	2018–19	National First Division	12	0	0	0	0	0	–		0	0	12	0
Total			12	0	0	0	0	0	0	0	0	0	12	0
