= Jamil Muhammad =

Nigerian footballer (born 2000)

Personal information
- Full name: Jamil Muhammad Muhammad
- Date of birth: 12 November 2000 (age 25)
- Place of birth: Enugu, Nigeria
- Height: 1.82 m (6 ft 0 in)
- Position: Midfielder

Team information
- Current team: Wej
- Number: 15

Senior career*
Years	Team	Apps	(Gls)
2016–2021	Kano Pillars	51	(0)
2021–2022	Katsina United	8	(0)
2022–2023	El-Kanemi Warriors	3	(0)
2023–2025	Sporting Lagos		
2025–	Wej		

International career^{‡}
2019–	Nigeria U20	7	(0)
- * Club domestic league appearances and goals as of 14:44, 12 April 2020 (UTC) ‡ National team caps and goals as of 14:44, 12 April 2020 (UTC)

Jamil Muhammad Muhammad (born 12 November 2000) is a Nigerian footballer who currently plays as a midfielder for Saudi club Wej.

On 29 August 2025, Muhammad joined Saudi Second Division League club Wej.

== Career statistics ==
=== Club ===
As of 12 April 2020.

Club	Season	League			Cup		Continental		Other		Total	
Club	Season	Division	Apps	Goals	Apps	Goals	Apps	Goals	Apps	Goals	Apps	Goals
Kano Pillars	2019	NPFL	3	0	0	0	–		0	0	3	0
Career total			3	0	0	0	0	0	0	0	3	0
