= Siphesihle Mkhize =

South African footballer

Personal information
- Full name: Siphesihle Elwin Mkhize
- Date of birth: 5 February 1999 (age 27)
- Place of birth: Umlazi, South Africa
- Height: 1.80 m (5 ft 11 in)
- Position: Midfielder

Team information
- Current team: Sekhukhune United
- Number: 15

Youth career
- –2019: Mamelodi Sundowns

Senior career*
| Years | Team | Apps | (Gls) |
| 2019–2021 | Mamelodi Sundowns | 1 | (0) |
| 2019–2020 | → Ajax Cape Town (loan) | 26 | (1) |
| 2021–2022 | → Chippa United (loan) | 26 | (1) |
| 2022–2023 | Chippa United | 22 | (0) |
| 2023– | Sekhukhune United | 62 | (2) |

International career^{‡}
| 2017–2019 | South Africa U20 | 9 | (1) |
- * Club domestic league appearances and goals as of 4 January 2026 ‡ National team caps and goals as of 21 July 2020

Siphesihle Elwin Mkhize (born 5 February 1999) is a South African soccer player who plays as a midfielder for Sekhukhune United.
