= 2022 Suwon Samsung Bluewings season =

Suwon Samsung Bluewings
2022 season
- Chairman: Lee Jun
- Head Coach: Park Kun-ha (until 15 April); Lee Byung-keun (from 18 April)
- Stadium: Suwon World Cup Stadium
- K League 1: 10th
- FA Cup: Quarter-finals
- Top goalscorer: League: Oh Hyeon-gyu (13); All: Oh Hyeon-gyu (14)
- Biggest win: 4–1 v Seongnam FC (14 August 2022); 3–0 v Suwon FC (16 October 2022)
- Biggest defeat: 0–3 v Daegu FC (8 May 2022); 0–3 v Suwon FC (25 June 2022)
Home colours	Away colours	Third colours

The 2022 season was Suwon Samsung Bluewings' 27th season in K League 1 in South Korea. They competed in the 2022 K League 1 and the FA Cup.

== Kits ==
- Kit supplier: Puma
- Main sponsor: Samsung Neo QLED 8K
- Rear sponsor: Deutsch Motors
- Sleeve partner: Galaxy S22 Series, Suwon City

Home	Away	Third

== Management team ==
Position	Name
Head coach	(South Korea) Park Kun-ha (until 15 April) (South Korea) Lee Byung-keun (since 18 April)
Assistant head coach	(South Korea) Choi Sung-yong
Assistant coach	(South Korea) Cho Jae-min
Goalkeeper coach	(South Korea) Kim Dae-hwan
Fitness coach	(South Korea) Kwon Bo-sung
Scout	(South Korea) Lee Kyung-soo
Scout	(South Korea) Lee Jong-min

== Players ==
=== Squad information ===
Players, squad numbers and age updated as of 10 September 2022.
Note: Flags indicate national team as has been defined under FIFA eligibility rules. Players may hold more than one non-FIFA nationality.

No.	Name	Nat.	Position(s)	Date of birth (age)	Signed in	Contract ends	Signed from
Goalkeepers
19	No Dong-geon	(South Korea)	GK	4 October 1991 (aged 30)	2014		(South Korea) Korea University
21	Yang Hyung-mo	(South Korea)	GK	16 July 1991 (aged 31)	2014	2023	(South Korea) Chungbuk National University
31	Lee Sung-ju	(South Korea)	GK	3 April 1999 (aged 23)	2021		(South Korea) Dongguk University
34	Park Ji-min	(South Korea)	GK	25 May 2000 (aged 22)	2018		(South Korea) Suwon Samsung Bluewings Academy
Defenders
3	Yang Sang-min	(South Korea)	CB / LB	24 February 1984 (aged 38)	2007	2022	(South Korea) Jeonnam Dragons
4	Dave Bulthuis	(Netherlands)	CB / LB	28 June 1990 (aged 32)	2022	2023	(South Korea) Ulsan Hyundai
11	Kim Tae-hwan	(South Korea)	RB / CB / RM	25 March 2000 (aged 22)	2018		(South Korea) Suwon Samsung Bluewings Academy
13	Park Hyung-jin	(South Korea)	CB / LB / LM	24 June 1990 (aged 32)	2018		(Japan) Fagiano Okayama
15	Go Myeong-seok	(South Korea)	CB / RB	27 September 1995 (aged 26)	2019		(South Korea) Daejeon Citizen
20	Lee Han-do	(South Korea)	CB	16 March 1994 (aged 28)	2022	2024	(South Korea) Gwangju FC
22	Kim Sang-jun	(South Korea)	CB / CF	1 October 2001 (aged 20)	2019		(South Korea) Suwon Samsung Bluewings Academy
23	Lee Ki-je	(South Korea)	LB / LM	9 July 1991 (aged 31)	2018		(South Korea) Ulsan Hyundai
33	Park Dae-won	(South Korea)	CB / RB / RM	25 February 1998 (aged 24)	2019		(South Korea) Korea University
35	Jang Ho-ik	(South Korea)	CB / RB / RM	4 December 1993 (aged 28)	2016	2023	(South Korea) Honam University
39	Min Sang-gi (captain)	(South Korea)	CB / LB	27 August 1991 (aged 31)	2010		(South Korea) Suwon Samsung Bluewings Academy
40	Heo Dong-ho	(South Korea)	DF	24 June 2000 (aged 22)	2022		(South Korea) Sun Moon University
45	Hwang Myeong-hyun	(South Korea)	DF	14 November 2001 (aged 20)	2022		(South Korea) Dongguk University
47	Hwang In-taek	(South Korea)	DF	1 April 2003 (aged 19)	2022		(South Korea) Suwon Samsung Bluewings Academy
90	Goo Dae-young	(South Korea)	DF	9 May 1992 (aged 30)	2019		(South Korea) FC Anyang
Midfielders
6	Han Seok-jong (third captain)	(South Korea)	DM / CM	19 July 1992 (aged 30)	2020	2023	(South Korea) Incheon United
8	Elvis Sarić	(Bosnia and Herzegovina)	MF	21 July 1990 (aged 32)	2022		(Croatia) Gorica
10	Jeong Seung-won	(South Korea)	CM / DM	27 February 1997 (aged 25)	2022	2024	(South Korea) Daegu FC
12	Kang Hyun-muk	(South Korea)	CM / DM	28 March 2001 (aged 21)	2020	2022	(South Korea) Suwon Samsung Bluewings Academy
17	Kang Tae-won	(South Korea)	CM / DM	3 March 2000 (aged 22)	2021	2023	(South Korea) Soongsil University
25	Choi Sung-keun (vice-captain)	(South Korea)	CM / DM	28 July 1991 (aged 31)	2017	2024	(Japan) Sagan Tosu
26	Yeom Ki-hun	(South Korea)	AM / CM	30 March 1983 (aged 39)	2010	2022	(South Korea) Ulsan Hyundai
30	Ryu Seung-woo	(South Korea)	AM / CM	17 December 1993 (aged 28)	2022	2023	(South Korea) Jeju United
36	Myung Jun-jae	(South Korea)	LW / AM	2 July 1994 (aged 28)	2020		(South Korea) Jeonbuk Hyundai Motors
55	Jeong Ho-jin	(South Korea)	DM	6 August 1999 (aged 23)	2022	2022	(South Korea) Jeonnam Dragons
88	Yu Je-ho	(South Korea)	CM / DM	15 August 2000 (aged 22)	2022		(South Korea) Dongguk University
92	Lee Jong-sung	(South Korea)	MF	5 August 1992 (aged 30)	2011		
Forwards
5	Manabu Saitō	(Japan)	LW	4 April 1990 (aged 32)	2022	2023	(Japan) Nagoya Grampus
7	Sebastian Grønning	(Denmark)	FW	3 February 1997 (aged 25)	2022	2023	(Denmark) Viborg
9	Kim Gun-hee	(South Korea)	FW	22 February 1995 (aged 27)	2016	2022	(South Korea) Korea University
14	Jeon Jin-woo	(South Korea)	ST / LW	9 September 1999 (aged 23)	2018		(South Korea) Suwon Samsung Bluewings Academy
16	You Ju-an	(South Korea)	LW / RW / RWB	1 October 1998 (aged 23)	2017		(South Korea) Suwon Samsung Bluewings Academy
18	Oh Hyeon-gyu	(South Korea)	RW / AM	12 April 2001 (aged 21)	2019		(South Korea) Suwon Samsung Bluewings Academy
22	An Byong-jun	(North Korea)	FW	22 May 1990 (aged 32)	2022		(South Korea) Busan IPark
77	Han Seok-hee	(South Korea)	CF / AM	16 May 1996 (aged 26)	2019	2023	(South Korea) Honam University
99	Koo Min-seo	(South Korea)	RW / AM	7 April 2002 (aged 20)	2022		(South Korea) Suwon Samsung Bluewings Academy

== Transfers ==
=== Released ===
Date	Position	Nationality	Name	Notes
1 January 2022	DF	(South Korea)	Jo Sung-jin	(Note: Jo Sung-jin retired from football in April 2022.)
7 February 2022	FW	(Serbia)	Uroš Đerić	
17 January 2022	FW	(Italy)	Nicolao Dumitru	(Note: Dumitru joined UTA Arad in January 2022.)
18 February 2022	DF	(Canada)	Doneil Henry	(Note: Henry joined Los Angeles FC in February 2022.)
31 August 2022	FW	(Denmark)	Sebastian Grønning	(Note: Grønning joined AGF on 31 August 2022.)

=== Loans in ===
Date	Position	Nationality	Name	From	Until	Ref.
1 July 2022	MF	(South Korea)	Jeong Ho-jin	(South Korea) Jeonnam Dragons	31 December 2022	

=== Loans out ===
Date	Position	Nationality	Name	To	Until	Ref.
27 December 2021	MF	(South Korea)	Kwon Chang-hoon	(South Korea) Gimcheon Sangmu	26 June 2023	
10 January 2022	MF	(South Korea)	Lee Kang-hee	(South Korea) Busan IPark	31 December 2022	
10 January 2022	DF	(South Korea)	Son Ho-jun	(South Korea) Jeonnam Dragons	31 December 2022	
7 February 2022	FW	(South Korea)	Park Hee-jun	(South Korea) Dangjin Citizen	31 December 2022	
17 June 2022	GK	(South Korea)	An Chan-gi	(South Korea) Cheongju FC	31 December 2022	
1 July 2022	MF	(South Korea)	Han Seok-hee	(South Korea) Jeonnam Dragons	31 December 2022	
6 July 2022	DF	(South Korea)	Kim Sang-jun	(South Korea) Busan IPark	31 December 2022	
14 July 2022	DF	(South Korea)	Goo Dae-young	(South Korea) FC Anyang	31 December 2022	

=== Transfers in ===
Date	Position	Nationality	Name	From	Fee	Ref.
5 January 2022	FW	(Denmark)	Sebastian Grønning	(Denmark) Viborg	€941,000	
6 January 2022	DF	(South Korea)	Lee Han-do	(South Korea) Gwangju FC	€220,000	
7 January 2022	DF	(Netherlands)	Dave Bulthuis	(South Korea) Ulsan Hyundai	Free transfer	
11 January 2022	MF	(Bosnia and Herzegovina)	Elvis Sarić	(Croatia) Gorica	Free transfer	
27 January 2022	MF	(South Korea)	Jeong Seung-won	(South Korea) Daegu FC	€221,000	
4 February 2022	MF	(South Korea)	Ryu Seung-woo	(South Korea) Jeju United	Free transfer	
30 June 2022	FW	(Japan)	Manabu Saitō	(Japan) Nagoya Grampus	Undisclosed	
5 July 2022	FW	(North Korea)	An Byong-jun	(South Korea) Busan IPark	Undisclosed	

=== Transfers out ===
Date	Position	Nationality	Name	To	Fee	Ref.
3 January 2022	DF	(South Korea)	Lee Pung-yeon	(South Korea) Bucheon FC	Undisclosed	
5 January 2022	DF	(South Korea)	Choi Jung-won	(South Korea) Jeonnam Dragons	Undisclosed	
28 January 2022	FW	(South Korea)	Jeong Sang-bin	(England) Wolverhampton Wanderers	€1.28M	
6 January 2022	MF	(South Korea)	Kim Min-woo	(China) Chengdu Rongcheng	Undisclosed	
6 July 2022	DF	(South Korea)	Lee Han-do	(South Korea) Busan IPark	Undisclosed	
5 August 2022	FW	(South Korea)	Kim Gun-hee	(Japan) Hokkaido Consadole Sapporo	Undisclosed	

== Friendlies ==
20 January 2022 Friendly	South Korea U-23	1–2	Suwon Samsung Bluewings	Jeju City
KST	Lee Ho-jae 90+2' (pen.)		Oh Hyeon-gyu 34'; Yeom Ki-hun 39' (pen.)	Stadium: Ae Hyang Stadium

29 January 2022 Friendly	Suwon Samsung Bluewings	2–0	Cheongju FC	Geoje
KST	Yeom Ki-hun 4'; Oh Hyeon-gyu 28'			Stadium: Geoje Sports Park

3 February 2022 Friendly	Suwon Samsung Bluewings	5–0	Ajou University	Geoje
KST	Grønning 39', 42', 60'; Han Seok-hee 57', 84'

5 February 2022 Friendly	Suwon Samsung Bluewings	1–2	Gimpo FC	Changwon
KST	Kang Tae-won 35'		Goal	Stadium: Changwon Football Center Auxiliary 4th Stadium

8 February 2022 Friendly	Suwon Samsung Bluewings	3–0	Hwaseong FC	Changwon
14:00 KST	Lee Ki-je 24'; Yeom Ki-hun 49'; Jeong Seung-won 65'			Stadium: Changwon Football Center Auxiliary 2th Stadium

10 February 2022 Friendly	Suwon Samsung Bluewings	0–1	FC Anyang	Changwon
KST			Jonathan 1'

== Competitions ==
=== Overview ===
Competition	First match	Last match	Starting round	Record							
Competition	First match	Last match	Starting round	Pld	W	D	L	GF	GA	GD	Win %
K League 1	19 February 2022	22 October 2022	Matchday 1	38	11	11	16	44	49	−5	28.95
FA Cup	27 April 2022	29 June 2022	Third round	3	1	1	1	3	4	−1	33.33
Total				41	12	12	17	47	53	−6	29.27

Source: Soccerway

=== K League 1 ===
==== League table ====
Pos	Team	Pld	W	D	L	GF	GA	GD	Pts	Qualification or relegation (Note: Teams played each other three times (33 matches), before the league was split into two groups, the top six and the bottom six.)
8	Daegu FC	38	10	16	12	52	59	−7	46	
9	FC Seoul	38	11	13	14	43	47	−4	46	
10	Suwon Samsung Bluewings (O)	38	11	11	16	44	49	−5	44	Qualification for relegation play-offs
11	Gimcheon Sangmu (R)	38	8	14	16	45	48	−3	38	Qualification for relegation play-offs
12	Seongnam FC (R)	38	7	9	22	37	70	−33	30	Relegation to K League 2

Source: Soccerway
Rules for classification: 1) Points; 2) Goals scored; 3) Goal difference; 4) Wins; 5) Head-to-head points
(O) Play-off winners; (R) Relegated

==== Results summary ====
Overall								Home						Away					
Pld	W	D	L	GF	GA	GD	Pts	W	D	L	GF	GA	GD	W	D	L	GF	GA	GD
38	11	11	16	44	49	−5	44	6	7	7	24	22	+2	5	4	9	20	27	−7

Source: K League

==== Results by round ====
Matchday	1	2	3	4	5	6	7	8	9	10	11	12	13	14	15	16	17	18	19	20	21	22	23	24	25	26	27	28	29	30	31	32	33	34	35	36	37	38
Ground	A	H	H	A	H	H	A	H	A	H	A	H	H	A	A	H	A	A	H	H	A	A	H	A	H	A	A	H	A	A	H	H	H	A	H	H	H	A
Result	L	W	L	D	D	D	D	L	L	W	L	W	W	D	D	L	L	L	D	D	L	L	L	W	D	W	L	W	W	L	D	L	L	W	D	L	W	W
Position	8	8	10	8	8	9	10	11	11	10	11	9	8	8	8	8	10	11	11	11	11	11	9	9	11	10	11	10	9	9	9	9	11	10	10	10	10	10

A = Away; H = Home; W = Win; D = Draw; L = Loss

==== Matches ====
All times are Korea Standard Time (KST) – UTC+9

19 February 2022 1	Incheon United	1–0	Suwon Samsung Bluewings	Incheon
16:30 KST	Lee Dong-soo (yellow card) 79'; Mugoša 90+1'	Report	Park Dae-won (yellow card) 1'; Kim Gun-hee (red card) 12'; Jeong Seung-won (yellow card) 45+3'	Stadium: Incheon Football Stadium; Attendance: 5,382; Referee: Kim Dae-yong; Assistant referees: Park Sang-jun; Kwak Seung-soon; Fourth official: Chae Sang-hyeop

26 February 2022 2	Suwon Samsung Bluewings	1–0	Suwon FC	Suwon
14:00 KST	Choi Sung-keun (yellow card) 13'; Park Hyung-jin 21'	Report	Nissilae (yellow card) 45+1'	Stadium: Suwon World Cup Stadium; Attendance: 5,626; Referee: Park Byung-jin; Assistant referees: Yoon Jae-yeol; Song Bong-keun; Fourth official: Kim Jong-hyeok

1 March 2022 3	Suwon Samsung Bluewings	0–1	Jeju United	Suwon
14:00 KST	Grønning (yellow card) 1'; Lee Han-do (yellow card) 42'	Report	Lee Chang-min (yellow card) 40'; Chung Woon (yellow card) 45+2'; Kim Ju-gong 63'; Kim Oh-gyu (yellow card) 73'	Stadium: Suwon World Cup Stadium; Attendance: 4,022; Referee: Ko Hyung-jin; Assistant referees: Ji Seung-min; Bang Ki-yeol; Fourth official: Choi Hyun-jai

5 March 2022 4	Seongnam FC	2–2	Suwon Samsung Bluewings	Seongnam
14:00 KST	Lee Jae-won (yellow card) 8'; Jeon Seong-soo 51' (pen.); Mulić 67'	Report	Park Hyung-jin (yellow card) 38'; Grønning (yellow card) 48'; Bulthuis (yellow card) 66'; Lee Han-do (yellow card) 72'; Kim Sang-jun 73'; Oh Hyeon-gyu 80'	Stadium: Tancheon Stadium; Attendance: 1,970; Referee: Choi Hyun-jai; Assistant referees: Kim Ji-wook; Yang Jae-yong; Fourth official: Kim Yong-woo

12 March 2022 5	Suwon Samsung Bluewings	1–1	Pohang Steelers	Suwon
16:30 KST	Kim Gun-hee 76' (pen.)	Report	Park Seung-wook (yellow card) 42'; Lim Sang-hyub 56' (pen.), (yellow card) 75'; Sin Jin-ho (yellow card) 86'	Stadium: Suwon World Cup Stadium; Attendance: 4,044; Referee: Kim Dong-jin; Assistant referees: Lee Jung-min; Sung Joo-kyung; Fourth official: Ahn Jae-hoon

19 March 2022 6	Suwon Samsung Bluewings	2–2	Gangwon FC	Suwon
14:00 KST	Park Dae-won (yellow card) 8'; Kim Gun-hee 46'; Yu Je-ho (yellow card) 57'; Kim Sang-jun 90+4'	Report	Yun Suk-young 23'; Hwang Mun-ki 50'; Kim Young-bin (yellow card) 79'	Stadium: Suwon World Cup Stadium; Attendance: 1,989; Referee: Park Byung-jin; Assistant referees: Ji Seung-min; Kim Ji-wook; Fourth official: Shin Yong-jun

2 April 2022 7	Gimcheon Sangmu	1–1	Suwon Samsung Bluewings	Gimcheon
16:30 KST	Cho Gue-sung 14'	Report	Sarić 62'	Stadium: Gimcheon Stadium; Attendance: 1,676; Referee: Lee Dong-jun; Assistant referees: Song Bong-keun; Jang Jong-pil; Fourth official: Cho Ji-um

5 April 2022 8	Suwon Samsung Bluewings	0–1	Jeonbuk Hyundai Motors	Suwon
19:00 KST	Grønning (yellow card) 57'; Kim Tae-hwan (yellow card) 82'	Report	Kim Jin-su (yellow card) 4'; Kim Jin-gyu 76'; Lee Yong (yellow card) 90'	Stadium: Suwon World Cup Stadium; Attendance: 3,275; Referee: Kim Dong-jin; Assistant referees: Kim Gye-yong; Kim Ji-wook; Fourth official: Kim Young-su

10 April 2022 9	FC Seoul	2–0	Suwon Samsung Bluewings	Seoul
19:00 KST	Lee Han-beom (yellow card) 19'; Lee Tae-seok (yellow card) 25'; Paločević 79'; Na Sang-ho 90+1'; Kang Seong-jin (yellow card) 90+2'	Report	Kim Gun-hee (yellow card) 43'; Kang Hyun-muk (yellow card) 84'	Stadium: Seoul World Cup Stadium; Attendance: 14,625; Referee: Lee Dong-jun; Assistant referees: Ji Seung-min; Kang Dong-ho; Fourth official: Kim Young-su

5 May 2022 10	Suwon Samsung Bluewings	1–0	Ulsan Hyundai	Suwon
16:30 KST	Grønning (yellow card) 37'; Sarić 63'; Oh Hyeon-gyu (yellow card) 74'	Report	Choi Gi-yun (yellow card) 24'; Kim Sung-joon (red card) 26'; Kim Tae-hwan (yellow card) 74'	Stadium: Suwon World Cup Stadium; Attendance: 11,418; Referee: Ko Hyung-jin; Assistant referees: Kwak Seung-soon; Park Kyun-yong; Fourth official: Park Byung-jin

8 May 2022 11	Daegu FC	3–0	Suwon Samsung Bluewings	Daegu
14:00 KST	Zeca 4'; Hong Jeong-woon (yellow card) 45'; Cesinha 59', (yellow card) 59'; Go Jae-hyun 65'; Lee Jin-yong (yellow card) 88'	Report	Jang Ho-ik (yellow card) 46'; Jeong Seung-won (yellow card) 72'	Stadium: DGB Daegu Bank Park; Attendance: 7,075; Referee: Park Byung-jin; Assistant referees: Lee Jung-min; Sung Joo-kyung; Fourth official: Cho Ji-um

14 May 2022 12	Suwon Samsung Bluewings	1–0	Seongnam FC	Suwon
19:00 KST	Han Seok-jong (yellow card) 21'; Jeon Jin-woo 90+1', (yellow card) 90+4'	Report	Goo Bon-cheul (yellow card) 61'	Stadium: Suwon World Cup Stadium; Attendance: 5,564; Referee: Song Min-seok; Assistant referees: Ji Seung-min; Kim Ji-wook; Fourth official: Seol Tae-hwan

17 May 2022 13	Suwon Samsung Bluewings	2–1	Gimcheon Sangmu	Suwon
19:00 KST	Goo Dae-young (yellow card) 25'; Lee Ki-je 29'; Yeom Ki-hun (yellow card) 52'; Jeon Jin-woo 69'	Report	Mun Ji-hwan (yellow card) 32'; Kim Han-gil (yellow card) 80'; Jung Seung-hyun (yellow card) 89'; Cho Gue-sung 90+2' (pen.); Lee Yeong-jae (yellow card) 90+3'; Kwon Hyeok-kyu (yellow card) 90+4'	Stadium: Suwon World Cup Stadium; Attendance: 2,290; Referee: Kim Dae-yong; Assistant referees: Yoon Jae-yeol; Song Bong-keun; Fourth official: Shin Yong-jun

22 May 2022 14	Jeju United	0–0	Suwon Samsung Bluewings	Seogwipo
16:30 KST	Kim Oh-kyu (yellow card) 18'; Chung Woon (yellow card) 33'	Report	Sarić (yellow card) 17'; Ryu Seung-woo (yellow card) 68'; Kang Hyun-muk (yellow card) 90+2'	Stadium: Jeju World Cup Stadium; Attendance: 4,027; Referee: Kim Yong-woo; Assistant referees: Kim Gye-yong; Kim Ji-wook; Fourth official: Choi Hyun-jai

29 May 2022 15	Gangwon FC	1–1	Suwon Samsung Bluewings	Gangneung
19:00 KST	Jung Seung-yong (yellow card) 14'; Kim Young-bin 22'; Yang Hyun-jun (yellow card) 78'	Report	Han Seok-jong (yellow card) 24'; Jeon Jin-woo (yellow card) 32'; Min Sang-gi (yellow card) 51' (yellow-red card) 79'; Oh Hyeon-gyu 64'; Bulthuis (yellow card) 69'	Stadium: Gangneung Stadium; Attendance: 2,069; Referee: Shin Yong-jun; Assistant referees: Kwak Seung-soon; Park Kyun-yong; Fourth official: Song Min-seok

19 June 2022 16	Suwon Samsung Bluewings	0–1	FC Seoul	Suwon
19:30 KST	Sarić (yellow card) 6'; Bulthuis (yellow card) 60'; Yeom Ki-hun (yellow card) 62'	Report	Cho Young-wook 57'	Stadium: Suwon World Cup Stadium; Attendance: 12,922; Referee: Ko Hyung-jin; Assistant referees: Yoon Jae-yeol; Yang Jae-yong; Fourth official: Kim Yong-woo

22 June 2022 17	Jeonbuk Hyundai Motors	2–1	Suwon Samsung Bluewings	Jeonju
19:00 KST	Barrow (yellow card) 35'; Hong Jeong-ho 48'; Kim Moon-hwan 71'	Report	Sarić 55'; Goo Dae-young (yellow card) 88'	Stadium: Jeonju World Cup Stadium; Attendance: 4,815; Referee: Park Byung-jin; Assistant referees: Park Sang-jun; Sung Joo-kyung; Fourth official: Jung Hoe-soo

25 June 2022 18	Suwon FC	3–0	Suwon Samsung Bluewings	Suwon
19:00 KST	Murilo Henrique 1'; Chang Hyuk-jin 5'; Lee Seung-woo 27'	Report	Jeong Seung-won (yellow card) 64'	Stadium: Suwon Stadium; Attendance: 6,090; Referee: Kim Jong-hyeok; Assistant referees: Kim Gye-yong; Song Bong-keun; Fourth official: Kim Yong-woo

3 July 2022 19	Suwon Samsung Bluewings	0–0	Incheon United	Suwon
19:30 KST		Report	Hong Si-hoo (yellow card) 25'; Kim Dong-min (yellow card) 53'	Stadium: Suwon World Cup Stadium; Attendance: 4,325; Referee: Song Min-seok; Assistant referees: Ji Seung-min; Kim Ji-wook; Fourth official: Shin Yong-jun

6 July 2022 20	Suwon Samsung Bluewings	1–1	Daegu FC	Suwon
19:00 KST	Jeong Ho-jin (yellow card) 19' (yellow-red card) 27'; Oh Hyeon-gyu 67'; An Byong-jun (yellow card) 85'	Report	Jo Jin-woo 29'	Stadium: Suwon World Cup Stadium; Attendance: 2,231; Referee: Lee Dong-jun; Assistant referees: Lee Jung-min; Park Kyun-yong; Fourth official: Kim Woo-Sung

10 July 2022 21	Pohang Steelers	1–0	Suwon Samsung Bluewings	Pohang
19:00 KST	Sin Jin-ho 19'; Park Seung-wook (yellow card) 42'	Report	Jang Ho-ik (yellow card) 17'; Sarić (yellow card) 58'	Stadium: Pohang Steel Yard; Attendance: 4,608; Referee: Kim Woo-sung; Assistant referees: Yoon Jae-yeol; Kang Dong-ho; Fourth official: Song Min-seok

16 July 2022 22	Ulsan Hyundai	2–1	Suwon Samsung Bluewings	Ulsan
18:00 KST	Won Du-jae (yellow card) 20'; Lee Kyu-seong (yellow card) 27', (goal) 51'; Kim Kee-hee (yellow card) 59'; Um Won-sang 63'	Report	Oh Hyeon-gyu (yellow card) 41'; Lee Jong-sung (yellow card) 62'; An Byong-jun 67'	Stadium: Ulsan Munsu Football Stadium; Attendance: 6,202; Referee: Jeong Dong-sik; Assistant referees: Ji Seung-min; Bang Ki-yeol; Fourth official: Jung Hoe-soo

27 August 2022 23	Suwon Samsung Bluewings	2–3	Gangwon FC	Suwon
18:00 KST	An Byong-jun 50'; Oh Hyeon-gyu 87'	Report	Kim Jin-ho 17', (yellow card) 83'; Rim Chang-woo 21'; Galego 53'; Lee Jeong-hyeop (yellow card) 90+3'	Stadium: Suwon World Cup Stadium; Attendance: 6,312; Referee: Shin Yong-jun; Assistant referees: Yoon Jae-yeol; Park Kyun-yong; Fourth official: Kim Woo-sung

20 August 2022 24	Jeju United	1–2	Suwon Samsung Bluewings	Seogwipo
20:00 KST	Jin Seong-uk 16'; Ahn Hyeon-beom (yellow card) 45+3'	Report	Oh Hyeon-gyu 21'; Ryu Seung-woo 30'	Stadium: Jeju World Cup Stadium; Attendance: 3,521; Referee: Kim Jong-hyeok; Assistant referees: Park Sang-jun; Bang Ki-yeol; Fourth official: Jeong Dong-sik

30 July 2022 25	Suwon Samsung Bluewings	0–0	Gimcheon Sangmu	Suwon
19:00 KST		Report	Han Chan-hee (yellow card) 69'; Myung Jun-jae (yellow card) 87'	Stadium: Suwon World Cup Stadium; Attendance: 4,072; Referee: Choi Hyun-jai; Assistant referees: Kwak Seung-soon; Jang Jong-pil; Fourth official: Chae Sang-hyeop

3 August 2022 26	Daegu FC	1–2	Suwon Samsung Bluewings	Daegu
19:30 KST	Zeca (yellow card) 14'; Cesinha 32', (yellow card) 54'; Lee Jin-yong (yellow card) 50'; Oh Seung-hoon (yellow card) 61'; Suzuki (yellow card) 90'	Report	Jeon Jin-woo 11'; Oh Hyeon-gyu 52', (yellow card) 53'; Kim Tae-hwan (yellow card) 90+3'; Lee Jong-sung (yellow card) 90+3'	Stadium: DGB Daegu Bank Park; Attendance: 8,551; Referee: Kim Young-su; Assistant referees: Yoon Jae-yeol; Sung Joo-kyung; Fourth official: Choi Hyun-jai

6 August 2022 27	Suwon FC	4–2	Suwon Samsung Bluewings	Suwon
19:30 KST	Kim Hyun 13', 68'; Jung Jae-yong 48'; Shin Se-gye (yellow card) 66'; Veldwijk 90+3'	Report	An Byong-jun 26'; Ryu Seung-woo 85'	Stadium: Suwon Stadium; Attendance: 6,022; Referee: Shin Yong-jun; Assistant referees: Park Sang-jun; Park Kyun-yong; Fourth official: Kim Yong-woo

14 August 2022 28	Suwon Samsung Bluewings	4–1	Seongnam FC	Suwon
19:30 KST	Go Myeong-seok 27'; Jeong Ho-jin (yellow card) 33'; Yang Hyung-mo (yellow card) 51'; Oh Hyeon-gyu 56'; Jeon Jin-woo 64', 80'	Report	Choi Ji-mook (yellow card) 2'; Park Soo-il 61'	Stadium: Suwon World Cup Stadium; Attendance: 4,496; Referee: Song Min-seok; Assistant referees: Lee Jung-min; Cheon Jin-hee; Fourth official: Ko Hyung-jin

4 September 2022 29	FC Seoul	1–3	Suwon Samsung Bluewings	Seoul
16:30 KST	Na Sang-ho (yellow card) 39' (yellow-red card) 56'; Iljutcenko (yellow card) 44', (goal) 89'; Yoon Jong-gyu (yellow card) 56'; Lim Min-hyeok (yellow card) 57'	Report	Oh Hyeon-gyu 27', 63'; An Byong-jun 31'; Lee Jong-sung (yellow card) 44'; Jeon Jin-woo (yellow card) 72'; Jang Ho-ik (yellow card) 90'	Stadium: Seoul World Cup Stadium; Attendance: 16,333; Referee: Jeong Dong-sik; Assistant referees: Lee Jung-min; Kim Ji-wook; Fourth official: Park Byung-jin

7 September 2022 30	Ulsan Hyundai	1–0	Suwon Samsung Bluewings	Ulsan
19:30 KST	Ádám 24'; Kim Min-jun (yellow card) 40'	Report	Saitō (yellow card) 50'	Stadium: Ulsan Munsu Football Stadium; Attendance: 4,960; Referee: Song Min-seok; Assistant referees: Kwak Seung-soon; Yang Jae-yong; Fourth official: Kim Yong-woo

11 September 2022 31	Suwon Samsung Bluewings	3–3	Incheon United	Suwon
19:00 KST	Jeong Seung-won (yellow card) 53'; Go Myeong-seok 56', 60'; Oh Hyeon-gyu 74'	Report	Kim Do-hyuk (yellow card) 23'; Lee Kang-hyun 41', (yellow card) 53'; Kim Dae-joong 90+1'; Kim Min-seog 90+6'	Stadium: Suwon World Cup Stadium; Attendance: 8,491; Referee: Kim Dae-yong; Assistant referees: Park Sang-jun; Lee Jeong-seok; Fourth official: Lee Dong-jun

14 September 2022 32	Suwon Samsung Bluewings	0–2	Pohang Steelers	Suwon
19:30 KST	Lee Jong-sung (yellow card) 60'; Lee Ki-je (yellow card) 64'	Report	Grant 28', (yellow card) 89'; Goh Young-joon 34'; Kang Hyeon-mu (yellow card) 57'; Ha Chang-rae (yellow card) 69'; Sin Jin-ho (yellow card) 88'	Stadium: Suwon World Cup Stadium; Attendance: 2,768; Referee: Kim Dong-jin; Assistant referees: Song Bong-keun; Seong Juk-yung; Fourth official: Kim Woo-sung

18 September 2022 33	Suwon Samsung Bluewings	2–3	Jeonbuk Hyundai Motors	Suwon
15:00 KST	Oh Hyeon-gyu 15'; Sarić (yellow card) 32' (yellow-red card) 37'; Bulthuis (yellow card) 56' (yellow-red card) 82'; Lee Ki-je (yellow card) 64'; Saitō 90+1'	Report	Ryu Jae-moon (yellow card) 20'; Yun Young-sun (yellow card) 40'; Cho Gue-sung 60'; Barrow (yellow card) 29', (goal) 62', 85'	Stadium: Suwon World Cup Stadium; Attendance: 10,018; Referee: Jeong Dong-sik; Assistant referees: Lee Jung-min; Park Kyun-yong; Fourth official: Seo Dong-jin

3 October 2022 34	Seongnam FC	0–2	Suwon Samsung Bluewings	Seongnam
14:00 KST	Mulić (yellow card) 74'	Report	Oh Hyeon-gyu 29'; Kwak Kwang-seon 54' (o.g.); Ryu Seung-woo (yellow card) 61'; Myung Jun-jae (yellow card) 90'	Stadium: Tancheon Stadium; Attendance: 3,024; Referee: Song Min-seok; Assistant referees: Kwak Seung-soon; Yang Jae-yong; Fourth official: Shin Yong-jun

9 October 2022 35	Suwon Samsung Bluewings	0–0	FC Seoul	Suwon
14:00 KST	Oh Hyeon-gyu (yellow card) 65' (yellow-red card) 90+5'; Lee Ki-je (yellow card) 65'; Lee Jong-sung (yellow card) 90'	Report	Kim Ju-sung (yellow card) 44'; Iljutcenko (yellow card) 65'	Stadium: Suwon World Cup Stadium; Attendance: 10,818; Referee: Kim Jong-hyeok; Assistant referees: Yoon Jae-yeol; Cheon Jin-hee; Fourth official: Ahn Jae-hoon

12 October 2022 36	Suwon Samsung Bluewings	1–2	Daegu FC	Suwon
19:30 KST	Go Myeong-seok (yellow card) 3'; Jeong Seung-won (yellow card) 41'; An Byong-jun 50', (yellow card) 74'; Bulthuis (yellow card) 90+3'	Report	Go Jae-hyun 20'; Cesinha 80'	Stadium: Suwon World Cup Stadium; Attendance: 3,093; Referee: Kim Dae-yong; Assistant referees: Kim Gye-yong; Sung Joo-kyung; Fourth official: Seo Dong-jin

16 October 2022 37	Suwon Samsung Bluewings	3–0	Suwon FC	Suwon
14:00 KST	Lee Jong-sung 25', (yellow card) 90'; Oh Hyeon-gyu 49'; Sarić (yellow card) 62'; An Byong-jun 90+1'	Report	Lee Seung-woo (yellow card) 82'	Stadium: Suwon World Cup Stadium; Attendance: 9,227; Referee: Lee Dong-jun; Assistant referees: Ji Seung-min; Song Bong-keun; Fourth official: Park Byung-jin

22 October 2022 38	Gimcheon Sangmu	1–3	Suwon Samsung Bluewings	Gimcheon
15:00 KST	Lee Joon-suk (yellow card) 16'; Choe Byeong-chan (yellow card) 33'; Kim Gyeong-min 37'; Mun Ji-hwan (yellow card) 62'; Kim Joon-beom (yellow card) 86'	Report	An Byong-jun 32', (yellow card) 85'; Jeon Jin-woo 79'; Lee Jong-sung 90+2'	Stadium: Gimcheon Stadium; Attendance: 2,460; Referee: Kim Dong-jin; Assistant referees: Kim Gye-yong; Yang Jae-yong; Fourth official: Chae Sang-hyeop

=== Promotion-relegation play-offs ===
As the tenth-placed team of the K League 1, Suwon Samsung Bluewings played against the third-placed team of the 2022 K League 2, FC Anyang, over two legs. The winner earned a place in the 2023 K League 1.

26 October 2022 First leg	FC Anyang	0–0	Suwon Samsung Bluewings	Anyang
19:30 KST	Park Jong-hyeon (yellow card) 15'	Report		Stadium: Anyang Stadium; Attendance: 4,863; Referee: Kim Jong-hyeok; Assistant referees: Kwak Seung-soon; Jang Jong-pil; Fourth official: Kim Woo-sung

29 October 2022 Second leg	Suwon Samsung Bluewings	2–1 (a.e.t.) (2–1 agg.)	FC Anyang	Suwon
14:00 KST	An Byong-jun 16'; Lee Jong-sung (yellow card) 59'; Kim Tae-hwan (yellow card) 69'; Oh Hyeon-gyu 120'	Report	Acosty 54'; Hong Chang-beom (yellow card) 61'; Lee Chang-yong (yellow card) 67'	Stadium: Suwon World Cup Stadium; Attendance: 12,842; Referee: Lee Dong-jun; Assistant referees: Yoon Jae-yeol; Bang Ki-yeol; Fourth official: Song Min-seok

Suwon Samsung Bluewings won 2–1 on aggregate.

=== FA Cup ===
The draw for the first five rounds was held on 7 February 2022.

27 April 2022 Third round	Gimcheon Sangmu	1–1 (a.e.t.) (3–4 p)	Suwon Samsung Bluewings	Gimcheon
15:00 KST	Kim Ji-hyeon 90'	Report	Min Sang-gi (yellow card) 7'; Jeong Seung-won 10'	Stadium: Gimcheon Stadium; Attendance: 522; Referee: Park Byung-jin; Assistant referees: Lee Jung-min; Kang Dong-ho; Fourth official: Seo Dong-jin
	Penalties
	Kwon Hyeok-kyu (penalty scored); Kim Ji-hyeon (penalty scored); Lee Yeong-jae (penalty scored); Cho Gue-sung (penalty missed); Kwon Chang-hoon (penalty missed)		(penalty missed) Yeom Ki-hun; (penalty scored) Lee Ki-Je; (penalty scored) Min Sang-gi; (penalty scored) Jeong Seung-won; (penalty scored) Sarić

25 May 2022 Round of 16	Suwon Samsung Bluewings	2–0	Gangwon FC	Suwon
19:00 KST	Kang Hyun-muk 31'; Grønning 40'; Sarić (yellow card) 74'	Report	Kim Dong-hyun (yellow card) 53'	Stadium: Suwon World Cup Stadium; Attendance: 983; Referee: Song Min-seok; Assistant referees: Lee Jung-min; Cheon Jin-hee; Fourth official: Park Byung-jin

29 June 2022 Quarter-finals	Jeonbuk Hyundai Motors	3–0	Suwon Samsung Bluewings	Jeonju
19:00 KST	Gustavo 40', (yellow card) 56'; Kim Jin-gyu 45+1'; Han Kyo-won 90+4'	Report	Min Sang-gi (yellow card) 20'; Bulthuis (yellow card) 67'	Stadium: Jeonju World Cup Stadium; Attendance: 2,286; Referee: Jeong Dong-sik; Assistant referees: Yoon Jae-yeol; Jang Jong-pil; Fourth official: Ko Hyung-jin

== Statistics ==
=== Appearances ===
No.	Pos.	Player	K League 1	FA Cup	Playoff	Total
3	DF	(South Korea) Yang Sang-min	5	0	2	7
4	DF	(Netherlands) Dave Bulthuis	35	3	2	40
5	FW	(Japan) Manabu Saitō	18	0	1	19
6	MF	(South Korea) Han Seok-jong	20	2	0	22
7	FW	(Denmark) Sebastian Grønning	14	2	0	16
8	MF	(Bosnia and Herzegovina) Elvis Sarić	28	3	2	33
9	FW	(South Korea) Kim Gun-hee	12	1	0	13
10	MF	(South Korea) Jeong Seung-won	29	3	0	32
11	DF	(South Korea) Kim Tae-hwan	31	0	2	33
12	MF	(South Korea) Kang Hyun-muk	29	2	2	33
13	DF	(South Korea) Park Hyung-jin	11	1	1	13
14	FW	(South Korea) Jeon Jin-woo	25	3	2	30
15	DF	(South Korea) Go Myeong-seok	23	2	2	27
16	FW	(South Korea) You Ju-an	6	1	0	7
18	FW	(South Korea) Oh Hyeon-gyu	36	1	2	39
19	GK	(South Korea) No Dong-geon	2	0	0	2
20	DF	(South Korea) Lee Han-do	13	3	0	16
21	GK	(South Korea) Yang Hyung-mo	35	3	2	40
22	DF	(South Korea) Kim Sang-jun	8	0	0	8
22	FW	(North Korea) An Byong-jun	18	0	2	20
23	DF	(South Korea) Lee Ki-je	35	2	2	39
25	MF	(South Korea) Choi Sung-keun	4	0	0	4
26	MF	(South Korea) Yeom Ki-hun	19	2	0	21
30	MF	(South Korea) Ryu Seung-woo	26	2	2	30
33	DF	(South Korea) Park Dae-won	11	0	0	11
34	GK	(South Korea) Park Ji-min	2	0	0	2
35	DF	(South Korea) Jang Ho-ik	29	3	2	34
39	DF	(South Korea) Min Sang-gi	24	3	0	27
77	FW	(South Korea) Han Seok-hee	2	0	0	2
88	MF	(South Korea) Yu Je-ho	6	1	0	7
90	DF	(South Korea) Goo Dae-young	8	0	0	8
99	FW	(South Korea) Koo Min-seo	0	0	0	0

Source: K League

=== Goalscorers ===
Rank	No.	Pos.	Player	League	FA Cup	Playoff	Total
1	18	FW	(South Korea) Oh Hyeon-gyu	13	0	1	14
2	22	FW	(North Korea) An Byong-jun	7	0	1	8
3	14	FW	(South Korea) Jeon Jin-woo	6	0	0	6
4	15	DF	(South Korea) Go Myeong-seok	3	0	0	3
5	8	MF	(Bosnia and Herzegovina) Elvis Sarić	2	0	0	2
5	9	FW	(South Korea) Kim Gun-hee	2	0	0	2
5	22	DF	(South Korea) Kim Sang-jun	2	0	0	2
5	30	FW	(South Korea) Ryu Seung-woo	2	0	0	2
5	92	MF	(South Korea) Lee Jong-sung	2	0	0	2
6	5	FW	(Japan) Manabu Saitō	1	0	0	1
6	7	FW	(Denmark) Sebastian Grønning	0	1	0	1
6	10	MF	(South Korea) Jeong Seung-won	0	1	0	1
6	12	MF	(South Korea) Kang Hyun-muk	0	1	0	1
6	13	DF	(South Korea) Park Hyung-jin	1	0	0	1
6	23	DF	(South Korea) Lee Ki-je	1	0	0	1
Own goals				2	0	0	2
Total				44	3	2	49

Source: Soccerway

=== Top assists ===
Assists counted for the K League 1 matches only.

Rank	No.	Pos.	Player	Assists
1	23	DF	(South Korea) Lee Ki-je	14
2	12	MF	(South Korea) Kang Hyun-muk	4
3	14	FW	(South Korea) Jeon Jin-woo	3
3	5	FW	(Japan) Manabu Saitō	3
4	35	DF	(South Korea) Jang Ho-ik	2
4	18	FW	(South Korea) Oh Hyeon-gyu	2
4	8	MF	(Bosnia and Herzegovina) Elvis Sarić	2
5	11	DF	(South Korea) Kim Tae-hwan	1
5	92	MF	(South Korea) Lee Jong-sung	1

Source: Soccerway

=== Discipline ===
No.	Pos.	Name	K League 1			FA Cup			Relegation play-offs			Total		
No.	Pos.	Name	Yellow card	(yellow card) (yellow-red card)	Red card	Yellow card	(yellow card) (yellow-red card)	Red card	Yellow card	(yellow card) (yellow-red card)	Red card	Yellow card	(yellow card) (yellow-red card)	Red card
4	DF	(Netherlands) Dave Bulthuis	4	1	0	1	0	0	0	0	0	5	1	0
5	FW	(Japan) Manabu Saitō	1	0	0	0	0	0	1	0	0	2	0	0
6	MF	(South Korea) Han Seok-jong	1	0	0	0	0	0	0	0	0	1	0	0
7	FW	(Denmark) Sebastian Grønning	4	0	0	0	0	0	0	0	0	4	0	0
8	MF	(Bosnia and Herzegovina) Elvis Sarić	4	1	0	1	0	0	0	0	0	5	1	0
9	FW	(South Korea) Kim Gun-hee	1	0	1	0	0	0	0	0	0	1	0	1
10	MF	(South Korea) Jeong Seung-won	5	0	0	0	0	0	0	0	0	5	0	0
11	DF	(South Korea) Kim Tae-hwan	2	0	0	0	0	0	1	0	0	3	0	0
12	MF	(South Korea) Kang Hyun-muk	2	0	0	0	0	0	0	0	0	2	0	0
13	DF	(South Korea) Park Hyung-jin	1	0	0	0	0	0	0	0	0	1	0	0
14	FW	(South Korea) Jeon Jin-woo	3	0	0	0	0	0	0	0	0	3	0	0
15	DF	(South Korea) Go Myeong-seok	1	0	0	0	0	0	0	0	0	1	0	0
18	FW	(South Korea) Oh Hyeon-gyu	3	1	0	0	0	0	1	0	0	4	1	0
20	DF	(South Korea) Lee Han-do	2	0	0	0	0	0	0	0	0	2	0	0
21	GK	(South Korea) Yang Hyung-mo	1	0	0	0	0	0	0	0	0	1	0	0
22	FW	(South Korea) An Byong-jun	2	0	0	0	0	0	0	0	0	2	0	0
23	DF	(South Korea) Lee Ki-je	3	0	0	0	0	0	0	0	0	3	0	0
25	MF	(South Korea) Choi Sung-keun	1	0	0	0	0	0	0	0	0	1	0	0
26	MF	(South Korea) Yeom Ki-hun	2	0	0	0	0	0	0	0	0	2	0	0
30	MF	(South Korea) Ryu Seung-woo	2	0	0	0	0	0	0	0	0	2	0	0
33	DF	(South Korea) Park Dae-won	2	0	0	0	0	0	0	0	0	2	0	0
35	DF	(South Korea) Jang Ho-ik	2	0	0	0	0	0	0	0	0	2	0	0
36	MF	(South Korea) Myung Jun-jae	1	0	0	0	0	0	0	0	0	1	0	0
39	DF	(South Korea) Min Sang-gi	0	1	0	2	0	0	0	0	0	2	1	0
55	MF	(South Korea) Jeong Ho-jin	1	1	0	0	0	0	0	0	0	1	1	0
77	FW	(South Korea) Han Seok-hee	1	0	0	0	0	0	0	0	0	1	0	0
88	MF	(South Korea) Yu Je-ho	1	0	0	0	0	0	0	0	0	1	0	0
90	DF	(South Korea) Goo Dae-young	2	0	0	0	0	0	0	0	0	2	0	0
92	MF	(South Korea) Lee Jong-sung	6	0	0	0	0	0	1	0	0	7	0	0
—		(South Korea) Park Kun-ha	1	0	0	0	0	0	0	0	0	1	0	0
—		(South Korea) Lee Byung-keun	2	0	0	0	0	0	0	0	0	2	0	0
—		(South Korea) Choi Sung-yong	1	0	0	0	0	0	0	0	0	1	0	0
Totals			65	5	1	4	0	0	4	0	0	73	5	1

Source: Soccerway
