= Han Seok-hee =

South Korean footballer

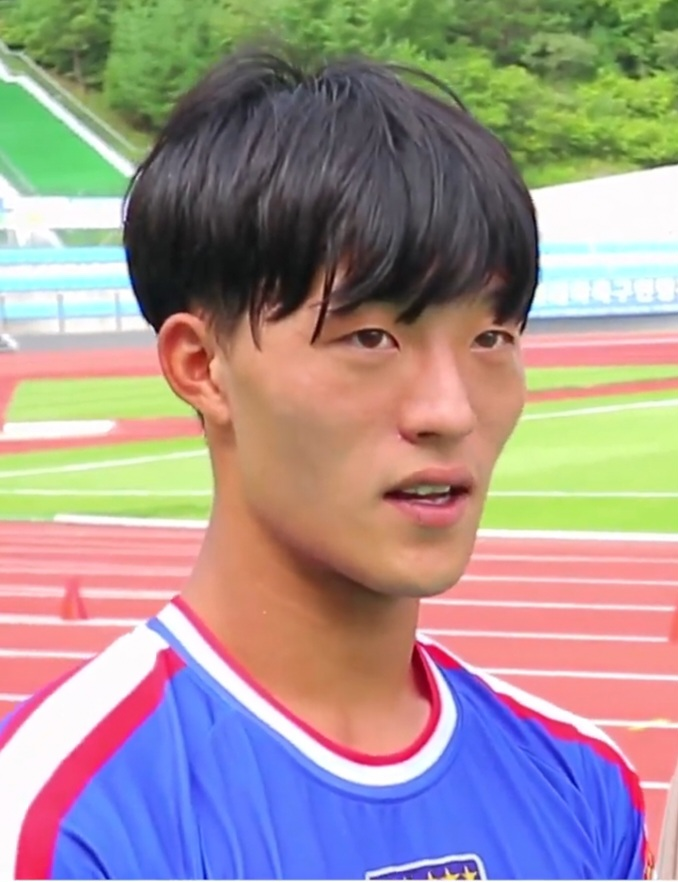

Personal information
- Full name: Han Seok-hee
- Date of birth: 16 May 1996 (age 30)
- Place of birth: Gangneung, South Korea
- Height: 1.70 m (5 ft 7 in)
- Position: Forward

Team information
- Current team: FC Mokpo

Youth career
- 2012–2015: Gangneung Jeil High School
- 2016–2018: Honam University

Senior career*
Years	Team	Apps	(Gls)
2019–2022	Suwon Samsung Bluewings	27	(4)
2022	→ Jeonnam Dragons (loan)	3	(0)
2022–2024	Cheonan City FC	8	(0)
2024–	FC Mokpo	8	(1)
- * Club domestic league appearances and goals as of 00:15 (UTC) 19 December 2024

Han Seok-Hee (Korean: 한석희; born 1 October 1998) is a South Korean professional footballer who plays as an attacker for FC Mokpo.

== Career ==
You started his career with Suwon Samsung Bluewings.

On 1 July 2022, he has been loaned to Jeonnam Dragons of K League 2, traded with Jeong Ho-jin.
