= Myung Jun-jae =

South Korean footballer

Myung Joon-jae
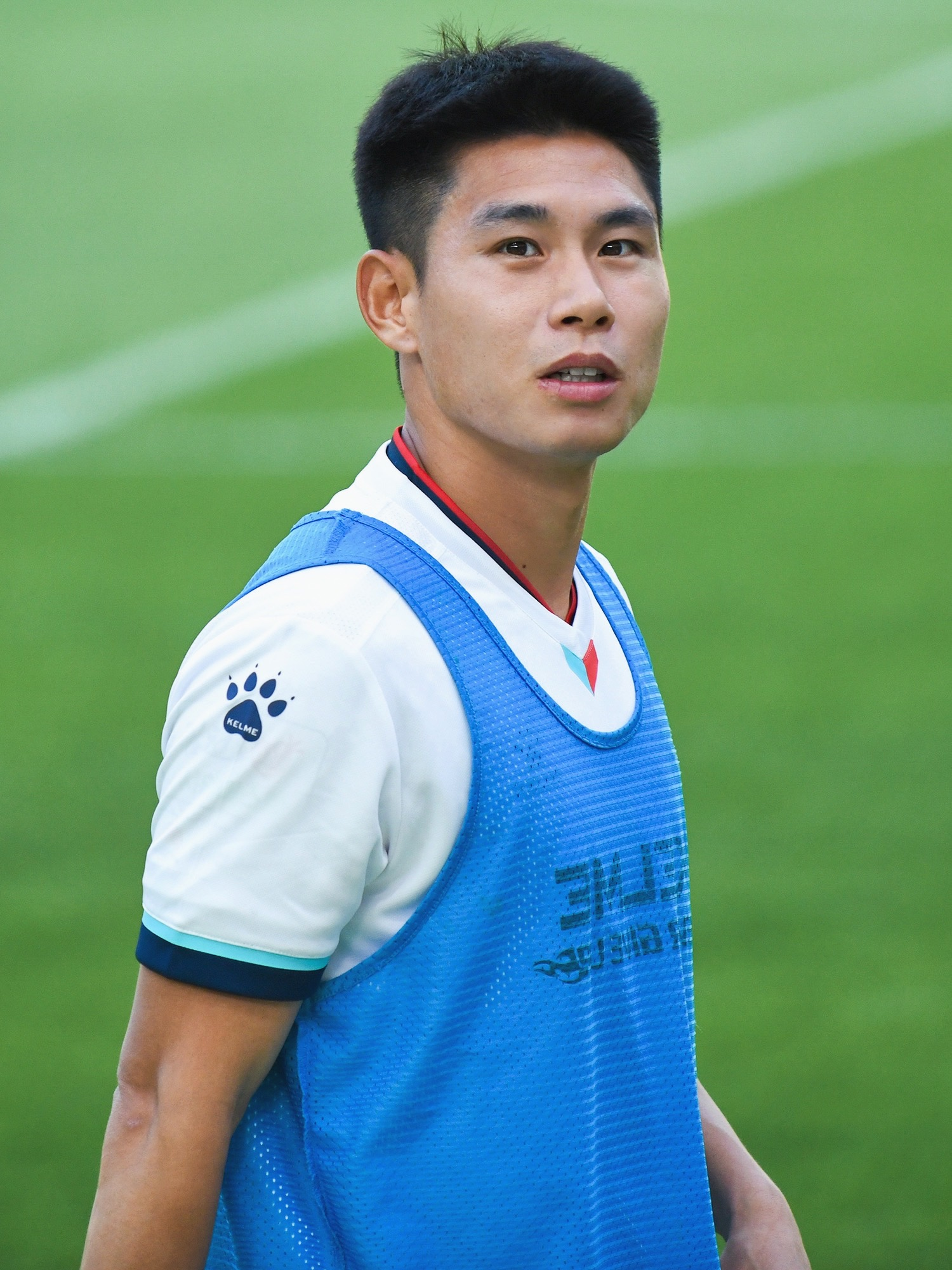
- Myung with Gimcheon Sangmu FC in May 2022

Personal information
- Full name: Myung Joon-jae
- Date of birth: 2 July 1994 (age 32)
- Place of birth: South Korea
- Height: 1.74 m (5 ft 9 in)
- Position: Midfielder

Team information
- Current team: Cheonan City
- Number: 17

Youth career
- –2015: Korea University

Senior career*
Years	Team	Apps	(Gls)
2016–2019	Jeonbuk Hyundai Motors	9	(0)
2017	→ Seoul E-Land (loan)	18	(3)
2019	→ Incheon United (loan)	16	(2)
2020–2024	Suwon Samsung Bluewings	26	(0)
2021–2022	→ Gimcheon Sangmu (army)	22	(4)
2024–	Cheonan City	27	(1)

International career
2009	South Korea U17	4	(0)
2015	South Korea U23	2	(0)
- * Club domestic league appearances and goals as of 7 January 2026

Myung Joon-jae (Korean: 명준재; born 2 July 1994) is a South Korean footballer who plays as a midfielder for Cheonan City.

== Career ==
Myung joined Jeonbuk Hyundai Motors in 2016. On 26 December 2016, he was loaned to the K League Challenge side Seoul E-Land.

== Career statistics ==
As of 26 October 2024

Appearances and goals by club, season and competition
Club	Season	League	League		Cup		Continental		Other		Total	
Club	Season	League	Apps	Goals	Apps	Goals	Apps	Goals	Apps	Goals	Apps	Goals
Jeonbuk Hyundai Motors	2016	K League 1	0	0	0	0	0	0	0	0	0	0
Jeonbuk Hyundai Motors	2018	K League 1	4	0	1	0	0	0	—		5	0
Jeonbuk Hyundai Motors	2019	K League 1	5	0	0	0	1	0	—		6	0
Jeonbuk Hyundai Motors	Total		9	0	1	0	1	0	0	0	11	0
Seoul E-Land (loan)	2017	K League 2	18	3	1	0	—		—		19	3
Incheon United (loan)	2019	K League 1	16	2	—		—		—		16	2
Suwon Samsung Bluewings	2020	K League 1	11	0	0	0	2	0	—		13	0
Suwon Samsung Bluewings	2022	K League 1	4	0	—		—		2	0	6	0
Suwon Samsung Bluewings	2023	K League 1	8	0	3	2	—		—		11	2
Suwon Samsung Bluewings	2024	K League 2	3	0	1	0	—		—		4	0
Suwon Samsung Bluewings	Total		26	0	4	2	2	0	2	0	34	2
Gimcheon Sangmu (army)	2021	K League 2	6	1	1	0	—		—		7	1
Gimcheon Sangmu (army)	2022	K League 1	16	3	0	0	—		—		16	3
Gimcheon Sangmu (army)	Total		22	4	1	0	—		—		23	4
Cheonan City	2024	K League 2	12	0	—		—		—		12	0
Career total			103	9	7	2	3	0	2	0	115	11
