= Jeong Seung-won (footballer) =

South Korean footballer (born 1997)

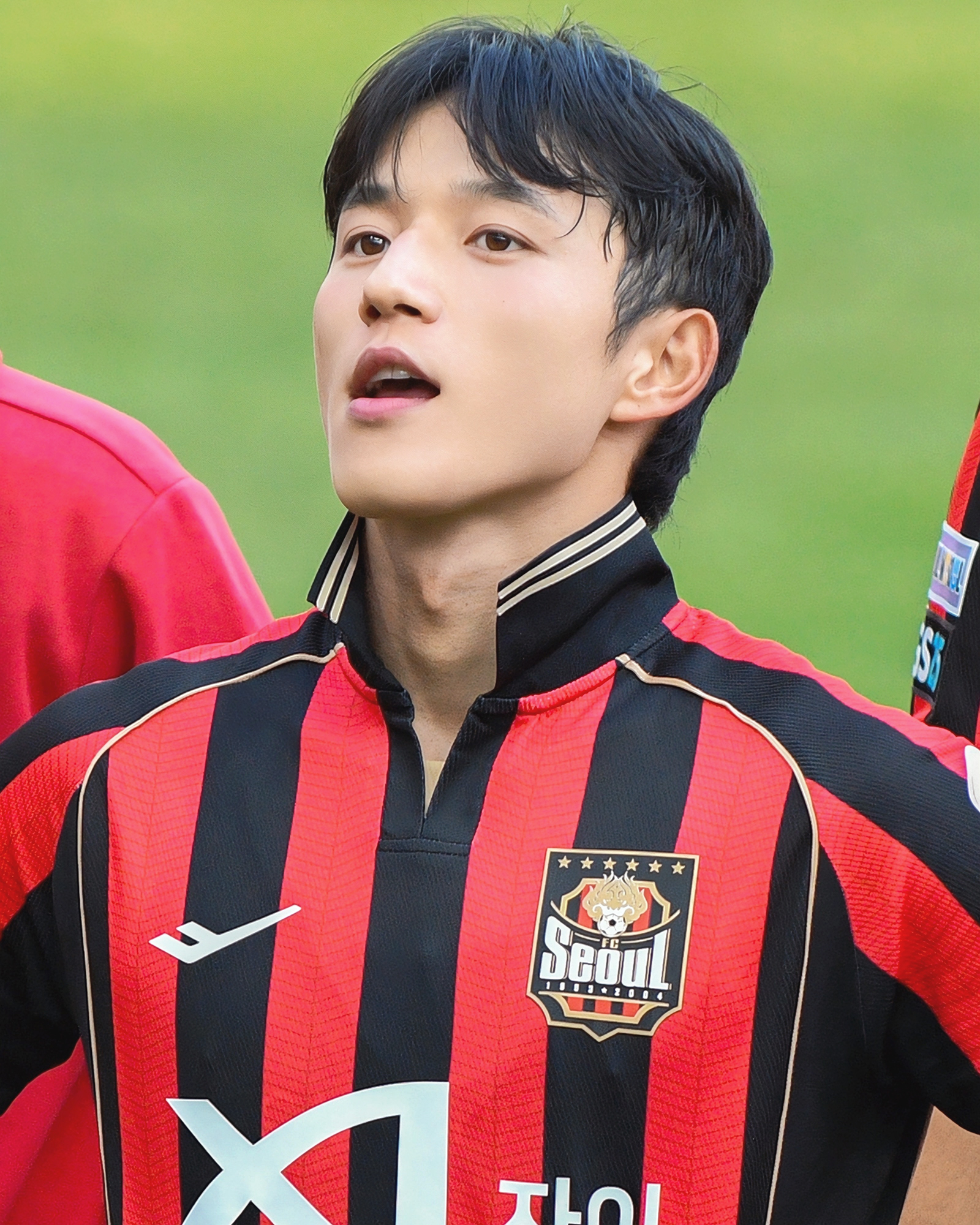
- Jeong with FC Seoul in 2026

Personal information
- Date of birth: 27 February 1997 (age 29)
- Place of birth: Jeonju, Jeonbuk, South Korea
- Height: 1.73 m (5 ft 8 in)
- Positions: Winger; midfielder; wing-back

Team information
- Current team: FC Seoul
- Number: 7

Youth career
- Andong High School

Senior career*
Years	Team	Apps	(Gls)
2016–2021	Daegu FC	121	(8)
2022–2023	Suwon Samsung Bluewings	46	(0)
2024	Suwon FC	38	(11)
2025–	FC Seoul	68	(10)

International career^{‡}
2019–2021	South Korea U23	15 (Note: Includes two appearances against another KFA team.)	(0)
2025–	South Korea	5	(0)
Medal record
Men's football
Representing South Korea
AFC U-23 Championship
Gold medal – first place	2020 Thailand
Korean name
Hangul	정승원
Hanja	鄭勝元
RR	Jeong Seungwon
MR	Chŏng Sŭngwŏn
- * Club domestic league appearances and goals as of 8 November 2026 ‡ National team caps and goals as of 6 October 2026

Jeong Seung-won (Korean: 정승원; born 27 February 1997) is a South Korean professional footballer who plays as a midfielder for K League 1 club FC Seoul and the South Korea national team.

== Club career ==
Born on 27 February 1997, Jeong made his debut as a substitute for Daegu FC on 6 May 2017, playing against Jeonbuk Hyundai Motors in the K League 1. He was a nominee for youth player of the year in the 2018 K League Awards.

== International career ==
In December 2019, Jeong was selected to be part of the South Korean squad for the 2020 AFC U-23 Championship, to be held in Thailand. South Korea won the championship, with Jeong playing in four matches.

== Career statistics ==
=== Club ===
As of match played 8 November 2026

Appearances and goals by club, season and competition
Club	Season	League			Korea Cup		Continental		Total	
Club	Season	Division	Apps	Goals	Apps	Goals	Apps	Goals	Apps	Goals
Daegu FC	2016	K League 2	0	0	0	0	—		0	0
Daegu FC	2017	K League 1	9	0	0	0	—		9	0
Daegu FC	2018	K League 1	31	4	5	0	—		36	4
Daegu FC	2019	K League 1	33	3	1	0	5 (Note: Appearances in AFC Champions League Elite)	0	39	3
Daegu FC	2020	K League 1	26	0	2	0	—		28	0
Daegu FC	2021	K League 1	22	1	1	0	1	0	24	1
Daegu FC	Total		121	8	9	0	6	0	136	8
Suwon Samsung Bluewings	2022	K League 1	29	0	3	1	—		32	1
Suwon Samsung Bluewings	2023	K League 1	17	0	1	0	—		18	0
Suwon Samsung Bluewings	Total		46	0	4	1	—		50	1
Suwon FC	2024	K League 1	38	11	0	0	—		38	11
FC Seoul	2025	K League 1	33	2	1	0	6	1	40	3
FC Seoul	2026	K League 1	35	8	0	0	3	0	38	8
FC Seoul	Total		68	10	1	0	9	1	78	11
Career total			273	29	14	1	15	1	302	31

=== International ===
As of match played 6 October 2026

Appearances and goals by national team and year
National team	Year	Apps	Goals
South Korea
South Korea	2025	2	0
South Korea	2026	3	0
Total		5	0

== Honours ==
Daegu FC

- Korean FA Cup: 2018

FC Seoul

- K League 1: 2026

South Korea U23

- AFC U-23 Championship: 2020
