= Park Hyung-jin =

South Korean footballer

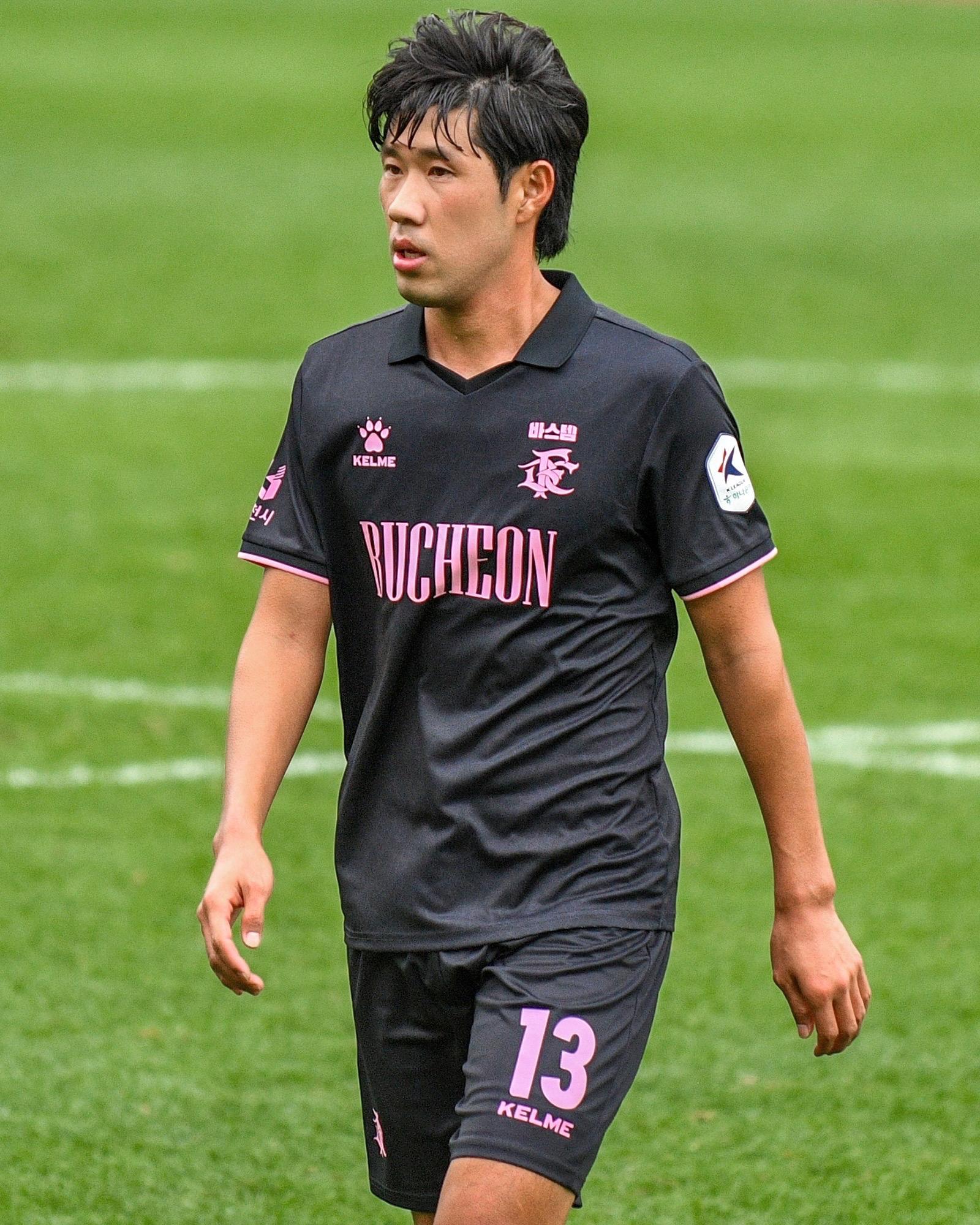
- Park in 2024

Personal information
- Date of birth: June 24, 1990 (age 36)
- Place of birth: Gyeongsangnam-do, South Korea
- Height: 1.82 m (6 ft 0 in)
- Position: Defender

Team information
- Current team: Bucheon FC 1995
- Number: 13

Youth career
- 2009–2012: Korea University

Senior career*
Years	Team	Apps	(Gls)
2013–2015	Sanfrecce Hiroshima	21	(1)
2015	→ Tochigi SC (loan)	37	(0)
2016	V-Varen Nagasaki	36	(1)
2017	Fagiano Okayama	33	(3)
2018–2022	Suwon Samsung Bluewings	54	(2)
2020–2021	Pocheon Citizen (draft)	36	(4)
2023–	Bucheon FC 1995	65	(2)
- * Club domestic league appearances and goals as of 6 January 2026

- Park Hyung-jin
- Hangul: 박형진
- Hanja: 朴亨鎭
- RR: Bak Hyeongjin
- MR: Pak Hyŏngjin

Park Hyung-jin (Korean: 박형진; 24 June 1990) is a South Korean football player. He currently plays for Bucheon FC 1995.

His elder brother, Park Jin-soo, is also a football player.

== Statistics ==
As of match played 9 November 2024.

Club	Season	League			Cup		League Cup		Continental		Other		Total	
Club	Season	Division	Apps	Goals	Apps	Goals	Apps	Goals	Apps	Goals	Apps	Goals	Apps	Goals
Sanfrecce Hiroshima	2013	J1 League	17	1	2	0	2	0	5	0	—		26	1
Sanfrecce Hiroshima	2014	J1 League	4	0	3	0	0	0	4	0	—		11	0
Sanfrecce Hiroshima	Total		21	1	5	0	2	0	9	0	—		37	1
Tochigi SC	2015	J2 League	37	0	1	0	—		—		—		38	0
V-Varen Nagasaki	2016	J2 League	36	1	1	0	—		—		—		37	1
Fagiano Okayama	2017	J2 League	33	3	—		—		—		—		33	3
Suwon Samsung Bluewings	2018	K league 1	19	1	2	0	—		5	0	—		26	1
Suwon Samsung Bluewings	2019	K league 1	23	0	5	0	—		—		—		28	0
Suwon Samsung Bluewings	2021	K league 1	1	0	—		—		—		—		1	0
Suwon Samsung Bluewings	2022	K league 1	11	1	1	0	—		—		1	0	13	1
Suwon Samsung Bluewings	Total		54	2	8	0	—		5	0	1	0	68	2
Pocheon Citizen (draft)	2020	K4 League	18	2	0	0	—		—		—		18	2
Pocheon Citizen (draft)	2021	K4 League	14	2	1	0	—		—		—		15	2
Pocheon Citizen (draft)	Total		32	4	1	0	—		—		—		33	4
Bucheon FC 1995	2023	K League 2	34	1	1	0	—		—		1	0	36	1
Bucheon FC 1995	2024	K League 2	23	1	3	1	—		—		—		26	2
Bucheon FC 1995	Total		57	2	4	1	—		—		1	0	62	3
Career total			270	13	20	1	2	0	14	0	2	0	308	14

^{1}Includes Japanese Super Cup, K League 1 Final B, K League 1 Final A and FIFA Club World Cup.
