= Lee Jong-sung =

South Korean footballer

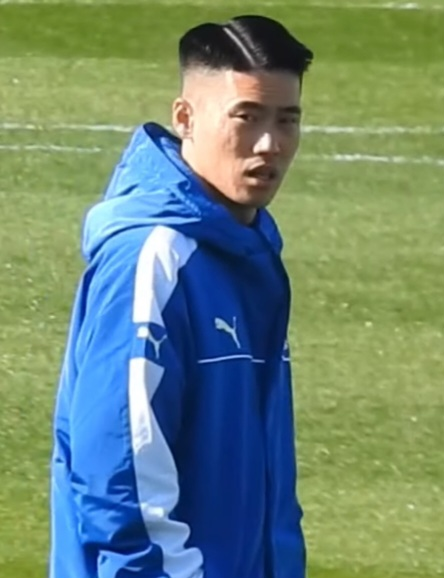
- Lee at a match between Suwon Samsung and Suwon FC, 2023

Personal information
- Date of birth: 5 August 1992 (age 34)
- Place of birth: Dangjin, South Korea
- Height: 1.87 m (6 ft 2 in)
- Position: Midfielder

Team information
- Current team: Hwaseong FC
- Number: 92

Senior career*
Years	Team	Apps	(Gls)
2011–2024	Suwon Samsung Bluewings	138	(7)
2012	→ Sangju Sangmu (loan)	0	(0)
2014	→ Daegu FC (loan)	31	(0)
2021–2022	→ Seongnam FC (loan)	36	(1)
2025	Cheonan City FC	31	(1)
2026–	Hwaseong FC	16	(0)

International career
2007–2008	South Korea U17	7	(0)
2011	South Korea U20	1	(0)
2012	South Korea U23	5	(0)
- * Club domestic league appearances and goals as of 5 August 2026

Lee Jong-sung (Korean: 이종성; born 5 August 1992) is a South Korean professional footballer who plays as a midfielder for K League 2 club Hwaseong FC.

== Career statistics ==
=== Club ===
As of 9 September 2024

Appearances and goals by club, season and competition
Club	Season	League			National Cup		Continental		Other		Total	
Club	Season	Division	Apps	Goals	Apps	Goals	Apps	Goals	Apps	Goals	Apps	Goals
Suwon Bluewings	2011	K League 1	0	0	—		1 (Note: Appearance(s) in AFC Champions League)	0	2 (Note: Appearance(s) in Korean League Cup)	0	3	0
Suwon Bluewings	2014	K League 1	3	0	—		—		—		3	0
Suwon Bluewings	2016	K League 1	19	0	3	0	2	0	—		24	0
Suwon Bluewings	2017	K League 1	35	2	2	0	3	0	—		40	2
Suwon Bluewings	2018	K League 1	24	3	2	1	9	0	—		35	4
Suwon Bluewings	2019	K League 1	5	0	3	0	—		—		8	0
Suwon Bluewings	2020	K League 1	6	0	1	0	1	0	—		8	0
Suwon Bluewings	2022	K League 1	15	2	—		—		2 (Note: Appearance(s) in promotion/relegation play-off)	0	17	2
Suwon Bluewings	2023	K League 1	21	0	2	0	—		—		23	0
Suwon Bluewings	2024	K League 2	17	1	1	0	—		—		18	1
Suwon Bluewings	Total		145	8	14	1	16	0	4	0	179	9
Sangju Sangmu (loan)	2012	K League 1	0	0	—		—		—		0	0
Daegu (loan)	2015	K League 2	31	0	—		—		—		31	0
Seongnam (loan)	2021	K League 1	26	1	—		—		—		26	1
Seongnam (loan)	2022	K League 1	10	0	1	0	—		—		11	0
Seongnam (loan)	Total		36	1	1	0	—		—		37	1
Career Total			212	9	15	1	16	0	4	0	247	10
