= Yang Hyung-mo (footballer) =

South Korean footballer

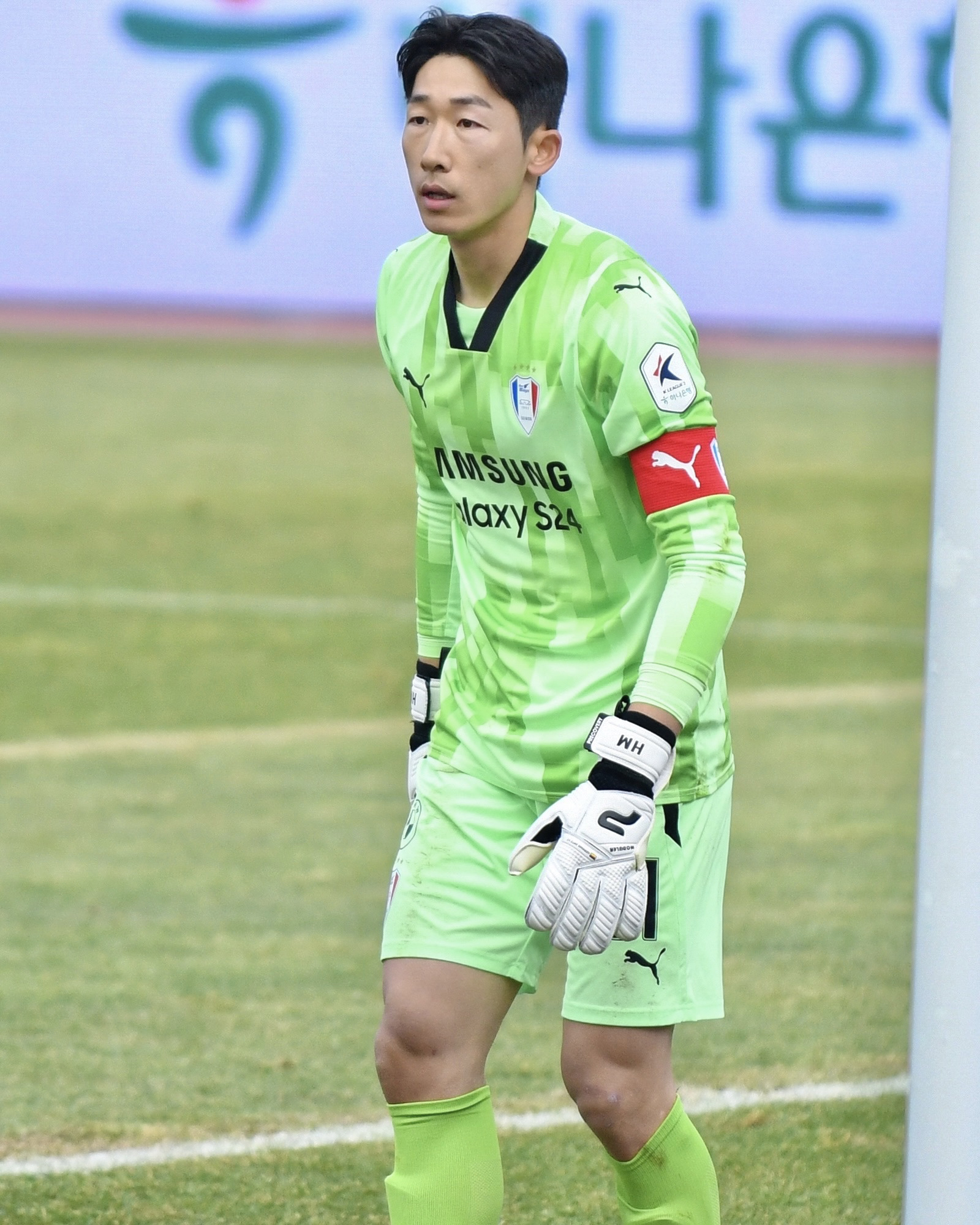
- Yang in 2024

Personal information
- Date of birth: 16 July 1991 (age 35)
- Place of birth: South Korea
- Height: 1.87 m (6 ft 2 in)
- Position: Goalkeeper

Team information
- Current team: Suwon Samsung Bluewings
- Number: 21

Youth career
- 2010–2013: Chungbuk National University

Senior career*
Years	Team	Apps	(Gls)
2014–	Suwon Samsung Bluewings	195	(0)
2015	→ Yongin City (loan)	25	(0)
2018–2019	→ Asan Mugunghwa (draft)	11	(0)
- * Club domestic league appearances and goals as of 6 January 2026

Yang Hyung-mo (Korean: 양형모; born 16 July 1991) is a South Korean footballer who plays as goalkeeper for Suwon Samsung Bluewings.

== Career statistics ==
=== Club ===
As of 8 September 2024

Appearances and goals by club, season and competition
Club	Season	League			National Cup		Continental		Other		Total	
Club	Season	Division	Apps	Goals	Apps	Goals	Apps	Goals	Apps	Goals	Apps	Goals
Yongin City (loan)	2015	K3 League	25	0	—		—		—		25	0
Suwon Bluewings	2016	K League 1	17	0	4	0	0	0	—		21	0
Suwon Bluewings	2017	K League 1	7	0	1	0	1 (Note: Appearance(s) in AFC Champions League)	0	—		9	0
Suwon Bluewings	2019	K League 1	1	0	0	0	—		—		1	0
Suwon Bluewings	2020	K League 1	16	0	0	0	5	0	—		21	0
Suwon Bluewings	2021	K League 1	23	0	0	0	—		—		23	0
Suwon Bluewings	2022	K League 1	35	0	2	0	—		2 (Note: Appearance(s) in promotion/relegation play-off)	0	39	0
Suwon Bluewings	2023	K League 1	36	0	1	0	—		—		37	0
Suwon Bluewings	2024	K League 2	22	0	1	0	—		—		23	0
Suwon Bluewings	Total		157	0	9	0	6	0	2	0	174	0
Asan Mugunghwa (draft)	2018	K League 2	4	0	2	0	—		—		6	0
Asan Mugunghwa (draft)	2019	K League 2	7	0	—		—		—		7	0
Asan Mugunghwa (draft)	Total		11	0	2	0	—		—		13	0
Career Total			193	0	11	0	6	0	2	0	212	0
