= Lee Jin-yong =

South Korean footballer (born 2001)

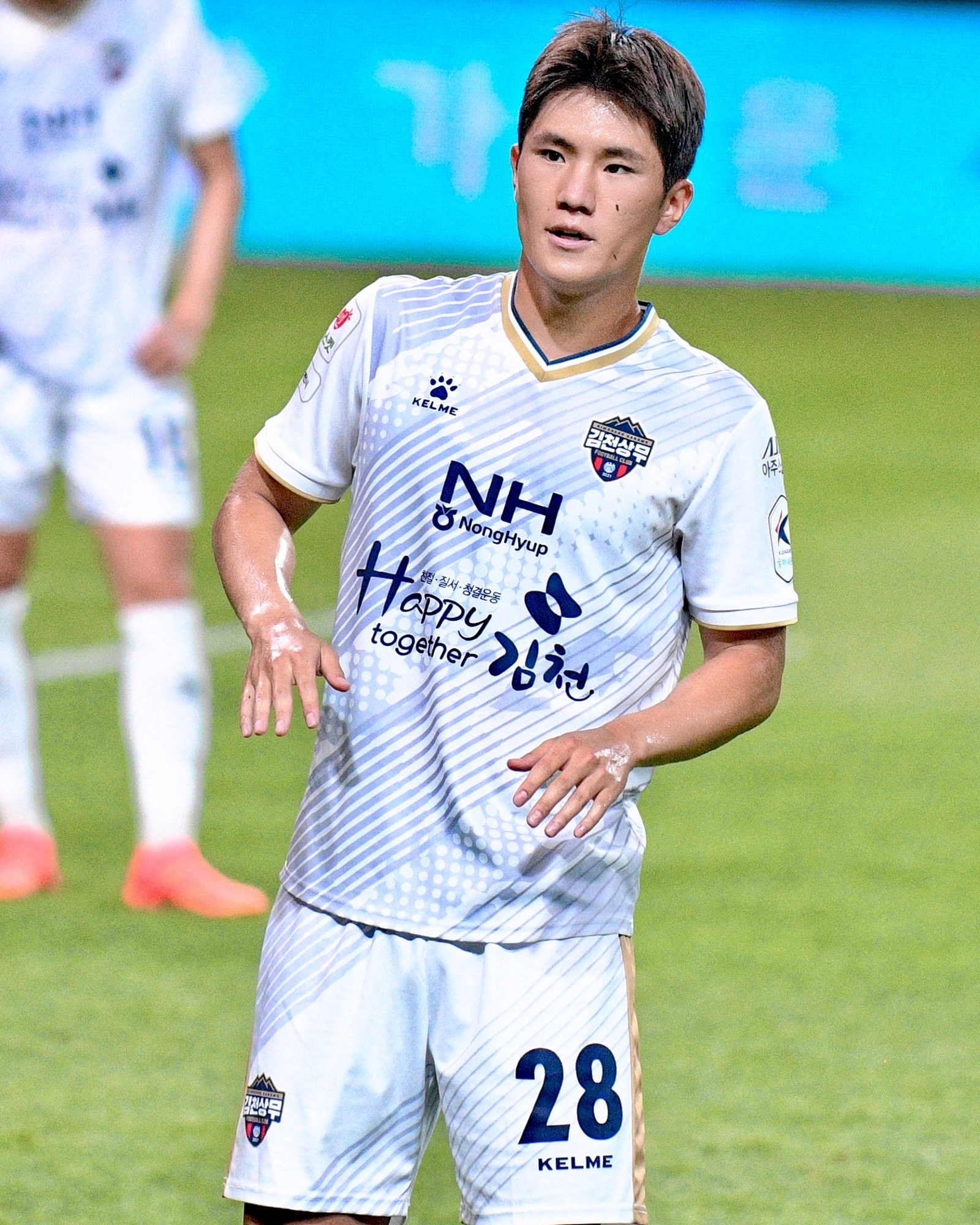
- Lee in 2024

Personal information
- Date of birth: 1 May 2001 (age 25)
- Place of birth: Daegu, South Korea
- Height: 1.80 m (5 ft 11 in)
- Position: Defender

Team information
- Current team: FC Anyang
- Number: 26

Senior career*
Years	Team	Apps	(Gls)
2020–2025	Daegu FC	100	(0)
2024–2025	→ Gimcheon Sangmu (Army)	10	(0)
2026–	FC Anyang	11	(0)

International career^{‡}
2016–2018	South Korea U17	13	(0)
2019	South Korea U20	7	(1)
2021–	South Korea U23	7	(0)
- * Club domestic league appearances and goals as of 3 August 2026 ‡ National team caps and goals as of 12 September 2023

- Lee Jin-yong
- Hangul: 이진용
- Hanja: 李鎮庸
- RR: I Jinyong
- MR: I Chinyong

Lee Jin-yong (Korean: 이진용; born 1 May 2001) is a South Korean football defender, who plays for FC Anyang in the K League 1, the highest tier of professional football in South Korea. Earlier in his career he played for Gimcheon Sangmu.

== Club career ==
Born on 1 May 2001 in Daegu, Lee made his debut for Daegu FC on 10 March 2021, playing against Gwangju FC in the K League 1. He finished the season on 29 appearances.

== Club career statistics ==
As of 5 January 2026

Club performance			League		Cup		Continental		Total	
Season	Club	League	Apps	Goals	Apps	Goals	Apps	Goals	Apps	Goals
South Korea			League		KFA Cup		Asia		Total	
2020	Daegu FC	K League 1	0	0	0	0	-		0	0
2021	Daegu FC	K League 1	29	0	3	0	5	0	37	0
2022	Daegu FC	K League 1	33	0	3	0	4	0	40	0
2023	Daegu FC	K League 1	31	0	0	0	-		31	0
2024	Gimcheon Sangmu	K League 1	10	0	2	1	-		12	1
2025	Daegu FC	K League 1	7	0	1	0	-		8	0
Career total			110	0	9	1	9	0	131	1

== Honors and awards ==
=== Player ===
Daegu FC

- Korean FA Cup Runner-up (1) : 2021
