= Elvis Sarić =

Bosnian footballer

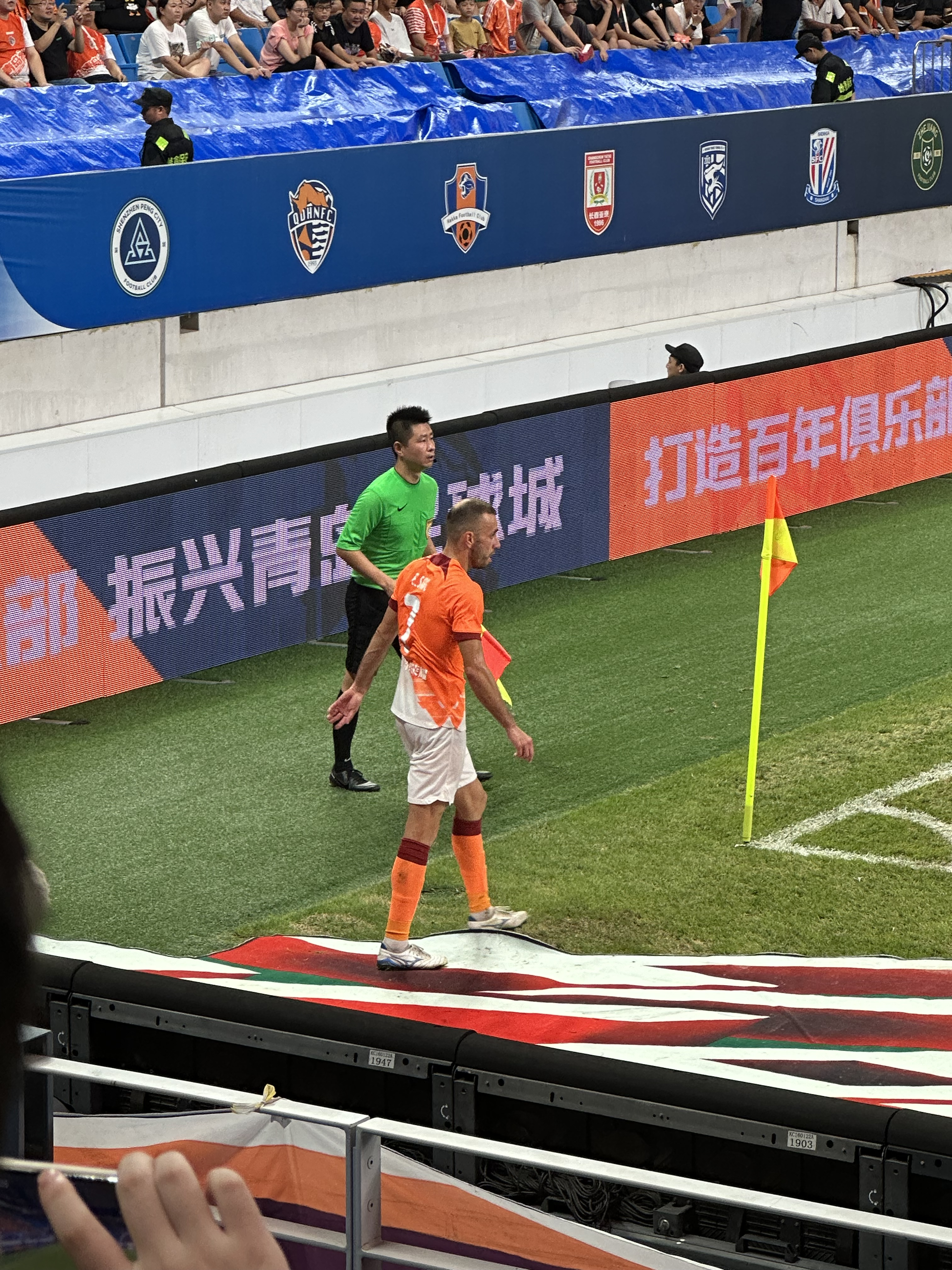
- Sarić taking a corner in August 2024

Personal information
- Full name: Elvis Sarić
- Date of birth: 21 July 1990 (age 36)
- Place of birth: Dubrovnik, SFR Yugoslavia
- Height: 1.81 m (5 ft 11 in)
- Position: Midfielder

Youth career
- GOŠK Dubrovnik

Senior career*
Years	Team	Apps	(Gls)
2008–2009	GOŠK Dubrovnik	31	(3)
2009–2013	Lučko	78	(19)
2013	Vinogradar	8	(5)
2014	Inter Zaprešić	14	(1)
2014–2016	Sloboda Tuzla	52	(5)
2016–2018	Sarajevo	55	(9)
2018–2019	Suwon Samsung Bluewings	30	(4)
2019–2021	Al Ahli	24	(0)
2021–2022	Gorica	5	(0)
2022	Suwon Samsung Bluewings	28	(2)
2023–2025	Qingdao Hainiu	79	(11)

International career
2018–2021	Bosnia and Herzegovina	19	(1)
- * Club domestic league appearances and goals as of 22 November 2025

Elvis Sarić (Bosnian pronunciation: [ělʋis sâritɕ]; born 21 July 1990) is a Bosnian professional footballer who plays as a midfielder.

Sarić started his professional career at GOŠK Dubrovnik, before joining Lučko in 2009. Four years later, he moved to Vinogradar. In 2014, he switched to Inter Zaprešić. Later that year, he went to Sloboda Tuzla. Sarić joined Sarajevo in 2016. Two years later, he signed with Suwon Bluewings. A year later, he was transferred to Al Ahli. He moved to Gorica in 2021. The following year, he went back to Suwon Bluewings.

Sarić made his senior international debut for Bosnia and Herzegovina in 2018, earning 19 caps until 2021.

== Club career ==
=== Early career ===
Sarić came through youth setup of his hometown club GOŠK Dubrovnik. He made his professional debut in 2008 at the age of 18. After leaving the team, he played in Croatia further for Lučko, Vinogradar and Inter Zaprešić.

In the summer of 2014, he joined Bosnian side Sloboda Tuzla.

In June 2016, he switched to Sarajevo.

=== Suwon Bluewings ===
In July 2018, Sarić moved to South Korean outfit Suwon Bluewings on a three-year deal. He made his competitive debut for the club on 11 July against Jeonnam Dragons. On 8 August, he scored his first goal for Suwon Bluewings in Korean FA Cup game against Cheonan City. Seven weeks later, he scored a brace against Ulsan Hyundai, his first league goals for the team.

=== Al Ahli ===
In July 2019, Sarić was transferred to Saudi Arabian side Al Ahli for an undisclosed fee. He made his official debut for the club against Al-Adalah on 22 August.

In September 2020, he suffered a severe knee injury, which was diagnosed as anterior cruciate ligament tear and was ruled out for at least six months. He returned to the pitch on 15 April 2021, over seven months after the injury.

=== Later stage of career ===
In September, Sarić signed with Gorica.

In January 2022, he returned to Suwon Bluewings.

In February 2023, Sarić joined Chinese Super League club Qingdao Hainiu.

== International career ==
In January 2018, Sarić received his first senior call-up to Bosnia and Herzegovina, for friendly games against the United States and Mexico. He debuted against the former on 28 January.

On 8 September, in a 2018–19 UEFA Nations League game against Northern Ireland, Sarić scored his first senior international goal.

== Personal life ==
Sarić married his long-time girlfriend Ivona in June 2020. He adheres to the Muslim faith.

== Career statistics ==
=== Club ===
As of match played 29 October 2023

Appearances and goals by club, season and competition
Club	Season	League			National Cup		Continental		Other		Total	
Club	Season	Division	Apps	Goals	Apps	Goals	Apps	Goals	Apps	Goals	Apps	Goals
GOŠK Dubrovnik	2008–09	Croatian Second League South	31	3	–		–		–		31	3
Lučko	2009–10	Croatian First League	24	6	—		—		—		24	6
Lučko	2010–11	Croatian First League	25	5	—		—		—		25	5
Lučko	2011–12	Croatian Football League	14	2	—		—		—		14	2
Lučko	2012–13	Croatian First League	15	6	—		—		—		15	6
Lučko	Total		78	19	—		—		—		78	19
Vinogradar	2012–13	Croatian First League	8	5	—		—		—		8	5
Inter Zaprešić	2013–14	Croatian First League	14	1	—		—		—		14	1
Sloboda Tuzla	2014–15	Bosnian Premier League	28	2	1	0	—		—		29	2
Sloboda Tuzla	2015–16	Bosnian Premier League	24	3	7	0	—		—		31	3
Sloboda Tuzla	Total		52	5	8	0	—		—		60	5
Sarajevo	2016–17	Bosnian Premier League	27	4	7	0	—		—		34	4
Sarajevo	2017–18	Bosnian Premier League	28	5	1	0	2 (Note: appearances in UEFA Europa League qualifying)	0	—		31	5
Sarajevo	Total		55	9	8	0	2	0	—		65	9
Suwon Samsung Bluewings	2018	K League 1	18	3	1	1	4 (Note: appearances in AFC Champions League)	0	—		23	4
Suwon Samsung Bluewings	2019	K League 1	12	1	2	1	—		—		14	2
Suwon Samsung Bluewings	Total		30	4	3	2	4	0	—		37	6
Al Ahli	2019–20	Saudi Professional League	24	0	4	0	0	0	—		28	0
Al Ahli	2020–21	Saudi Professional League	0	0	0	0	6 (Note: appearances in AFC Champions League)	0	—		6	0
Al Ahli	Total		24	0	4	0	6	0	—		34	0
Gorica	2021–22	Croatian Football League	5	0	0	0	—		—		5	0
Suwon Samsung Bluewings	2022	K League 1	28	2	3	0	—		2 (Note: appearances in K League 1 relegation play-offs)	0	33	2
Qingdao Hainiu	2023	Chinese Super League	28	3	2	0	—		—		30	3
Qingdao Hainiu	2024	Chinese Super League	28	3	0	0	—		—		28	3
Qingdao Hainiu	2025	Chinese Super League	23	5	1	0	—		—		24	5
Qingdao Hainiu	Total		79	11	3	0	—		—		82	11
Career total			404	59	29	2	12	0	2	0	447	61

=== International ===
As of match played 12 October 2021

Appearances and goals by national team and year
National team	Year	Apps	Goals
Bosnia and Herzegovina
Bosnia and Herzegovina	2018	12	1
Bosnia and Herzegovina	2019	6	0
Bosnia and Herzegovina	2020	0	0
Bosnia and Herzegovina	2021	1	0
Total		19	1

Scores and results list Bosnia and Herzegovina's goal tally first, score column indicates score after each Sarić goal.

List of international goals scored by Elvis Sarić
No.	Date	Venue	Cap	Opponent	Score	Result	Competition
1	8 September 2018	Windsor Park, Belfast, Northern Ireland	7	Northern Ireland	2–0	2–1	2018–19 UEFA Nations League
