= Oh Hyeon-gyu =

South Korean footballer (born 2001)

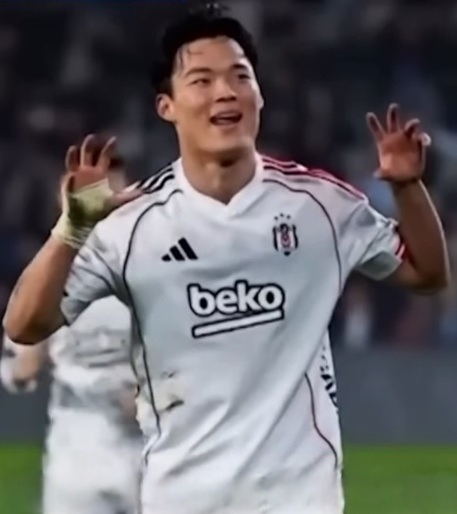
- Oh with Beşiktaş in 2026

Personal information
- Date of birth: 12 April 2001 (age 25)
- Place of birth: Namyangju, South Korea
- Height: 1.87 m (6 ft 2 in)
- Position: Forward

Team information
- Current team: Beşiktaş
- Number: 9

Youth career
- 2014–2019: Suwon Samsung Bluewings (Note: Played for Maetan Middle School from 2014 to 2016, and Maetan High School from 2017 to 2019, which were academies of Suwon Samsung Bluewings.)

Senior career*
Years	Team	Apps	(Gls)
2019–2023	Suwon Samsung Bluewings	49	(13)
2020–2021	→ Gimcheon Sangmu (draft)	38	(7)
2023–2024	Celtic	36	(11)
2024–2026	Genk	56	(15)
2026–	Beşiktaş	23	(7)

International career^{‡}
2015	South Korea U14	4	(5)
2016–2018	South Korea U17	13 (Note: Includes ten appearances and four goals against clubs.)	(4)
2019	South Korea U20	4	(2)
2021–2022	South Korea U23	4	(1)
2022–	South Korea	36	(9)
- * Club domestic league appearances and goals as of 22 November 2026 ‡ National team caps and goals as of 17 November 2026

- Oh Hyeon-gyu
- Hangul: 오현규
- Hanja: 吳賢揆
- RR: O Hyeongyu
- MR: O Hyŏn'gyu
- IPA: [o.ɦjʌn.ɡju]

Oh Hyeon-gyu (Korean: 오현규; born 12 April 2001) is a South Korean professional footballer who plays as a forward for Süper Lig club Beşiktaş and the South Korea national team.

== Club career ==
=== Suwon Samsung Bluewings ===
Oh made his professional debut in K League 1 with the Suwon Samsung Bluewings during the 2019 season, making eleven league appearances. He spent the next two seasons on loan at military club Sangju Sangmu (renamed Gimcheon Sangmu in 2021), during his duration of military service. He returned to the Bluewings in the 2022 season and was the club's top scorer with 13 league goals.

=== Celtic ===
On 25 January 2023, Oh joined Scottish Premiership club Celtic for an undisclosed fee, reported to be around of £2.5 million, signing a five-year contract. He was assigned the number 19 shirt.

He made his debut on 29 January 2023, in a league game against Dundee United, replacing Kyogo Furuhashi in the 82nd minute of an eventual 2–0 victory. Then, he scored his first goal for the club on 11 February, in a 5–1 Scottish Cup win over St. Mirren. Oh scored 11 goals during 36 league appearances including six starts, while usually playing as a substitute for main striker Furuhashi. However, he did not get playing time for half a year after Adam Idah came to the team on a loan deal.

=== Genk ===
On 14 July 2024, Oh signed a four-year contract with Belgian Pro League club Genk. On 22 September, he scored his first goal for Genk in a 4–0 win over Dender. On 28 September, he led Genk's 2–1 win by scoring twice, while playing 31 minutes as a substitute in the next Pro League match against Mechelen. He scored 1.33 goals per 90 minutes (9 goals in 610 minutes) as he played as a substitute for main striker Tolu Arokodare in his first season at Genk.

In the summer of 2025, Oh had a medical examination in Germany after receiving an offer from Bundesliga club VfB Stuttgart. However, the condition of his cruciate ligament did not satisfy Stuttgart, and they requested to convert his permanent move into a loan deal. He suffered a cruciate ligament injury in his boyhood, but his knee had no problems during his professional career until this point. Genk refused the request and cancelled his transfer. On 22 August, he scored his first goal at UEFA competitions in the UEFA Europa League play-off first leg against Lech Poznań, which ended in a 5–1 win. On 25 September, he scored the winning goal in a 1–0 win over Rangers, the first league phase match at the Europa League. He played as a main striker for Genk during the first half of the 2025–26 season, but his status at the club was lowered again after manager Thorsten Fink was sacked for poor results until December.

=== Beşiktaş ===
Oh with Beşiktaş in 2026

On 4 February 2026, Oh signed a three-and-a-half-year contract with Süper Lig club Beşiktaş, who paid a transfer fee of €14 million. On 8 February, he scored an equaliser and won a penalty in his first Süper Lig match against Alanyaspor, which ended in a 2–2 draw. He also scored a goal in each of the two subsequent matches against İstanbul Başakşehir and Göztepe, becoming the first-ever Beşiktaş player to score in all of the first three matches.

== International career ==
Oh represented South Korea at between the under-14 and under-23 level. On 11 November 2022, he made his senior international debut in a friendly against Iceland. On 10 October 2024, he scored his first goal for the senior national team in a FIFA World Cup qualifier against Jordan, which ended in a 2–0 win.

Oh was included in the South Korea squad ahead of the 2026 FIFA World Cup. On 11 June, Oh scored the decisive second goal against the Czech Republic in his country's first group stage match, leading to an eventual 2–1 victory.

== Career statistics ==
=== Club ===
As of match played 6 November 2026

Appearances and goals by club, season and competition
Club	Season	League			National cup (Note: Includes Korean FA Cup, Scottish Cup, Belgian Cup, Turkish Cup)		League cup (Note: Includes Scottish League Cup)		Continental		Other		Total	
Club	Season	Division	Apps	Goals	Apps	Goals	Apps	Goals	Apps	Goals	Apps	Goals	Apps	Goals
Suwon Samsung Bluewings	2019	K League 1	11	0	1	0	—		—		—		12	0
Suwon Samsung Bluewings	2021	K League 1	2	0	0	0	—		—		—		2	0
Suwon Samsung Bluewings	2022	K League 1	36	13	1	0	—		—		2 (Note: Appearances in K League promotion-relegation play-offs)	1	39	14
Suwon Samsung Bluewings	Total		49	13	2	0	—		—		2	1	53	14
Gimcheon Sangmu (draft)	2020	K League 1	5	2	0	0	—		—		—		5	2
Gimcheon Sangmu (draft)	2021	K League 2	33	5	2	2	—		—		—		35	7
Gimcheon Sangmu (draft)	Total		38	7	2	2	—		—		—		40	9
Celtic	2022–23	Scottish Premiership	16	6	4	1	1	0	—		—		21	7
Celtic	2023–24	Scottish Premiership	20	5	1	0	0	0	5 (Note: Appearances in UEFA Champions League)	0	—		26	5
Celtic	Total		36	11	5	1	1	0	5	0	—		47	12
Genk	2024–25	Belgian Pro League	36	9	5	3	—		—		—		41	12
Genk	2025–26	Belgian Pro League	20	6	2	0	—		10 (Note: Appearances in UEFA Europa League)	4	—		32	10
Genk	Total		56	15	7	3	—		10	4	—		73	22
Beşiktaş	2025–26	Süper Lig	13	6	3	2	—		—		—		16	8
Beşiktaş	2026–27	Süper Lig	9	1	0	0	—		10	3	—		19	4
Beşiktaş	Total		22	7	3	2	—		10	3	—		35	12
Career total			201	53	19	8	1	0	25	7	2	1	248	69

=== International ===
As of match played 17 November 2026

Appearances and goals by national team and year
National team	Year	Apps	Goals
South Korea	2022	1	0
South Korea	2023	6	0
South Korea	2024	8	2
South Korea	2025	9	4
South Korea	2026	12	3
Total		36	9

Scores and results list South Korea's goal tally first, score column indicates score after each Oh goal.

List of international goals scored by Oh Hyeon-gyu
No.	Date	Venue	Opponent	Score	Result	Competition
1	10 October 2024	Amman International Stadium, Amman, Jordan	Jordan	2–0	2–0	2026 FIFA World Cup qualification
2	15 October 2024	Yongin Mireu Stadium, Yongin, South Korea	Iraq	2–1	3–2	2026 FIFA World Cup qualification
3	5 June 2025	Basra International Stadium, Basra, Iraq	Iraq	2–0	2–0	2026 FIFA World Cup qualification
4	10 June 2025	Seoul World Cup Stadium, Seoul, South Korea	Kuwait	3–0	4–0	2026 FIFA World Cup qualification
5	9 September 2025	Geodis Park, Nashville, United States	Mexico	2–1	2–2	Friendly
6	14 October 2025	Seoul World Cup Stadium, Seoul, South Korea	Paraguay	2–0	2–0	Friendly
7	11 June 2026	Estadio Akron, Zapopan, Mexico	Czech Republic	2–1	2–1	2026 FIFA World Cup
8	24 September 2026	Suwon World Cup Stadium, Suwon, South Korea	Ecuador	1–0	3–0	Friendly
9	13 November 2026	Jassim bin Hamad Stadium, Al Rayyan, Qatar	Saudi Arabia	1–1	2–3	Friendly

== Honours ==
Suwon Samsung Bluewings

- Korean FA Cup: 2019

Gimcheon Sangmu

- K League 2: 2021

Celtic

- Scottish Premiership: 2022–23, 2023–24
- Scottish Cup: 2022–23, 2023–24
- Scottish League Cup: 2022–23

Individual

- K League Goal of the Month: September 2022
- Süper Lig Goal of the Month: February 2026
