= Choi Ji-mook =

South Korean footballer

Personal information
- Date of birth: October 9, 1998 (age 28)
- Place of birth: South Korea
- Height: 1.78 m (5 ft 10 in)
- Positions: Centre-back; left-back

Team information
- Current team: Suwon Samsung Bluewings
- Number: 18

Youth career
- 2014–2016: Ulsan Hyundai High School
- 2017–2019: Ulsan University

Senior career*
Years	Team	Apps	(Gls)
2020–2022	Seongnam FC	55	(1)
2023	Busan IPark	26	(1)
2024–	Suwon Samsung Bluewings	3	(0)
- * Club domestic league appearances and goals as of 6 January 2026

Choi Ji-mook (Korean: 최지묵; born October 9, 1998) is a South Korean professional footballer who plays as a defender for the Suwon Samsung Bluewings of the K League 2.

== Career statistics ==
=== Club ===
As of 13 December 2023.

Club	Season	League			Cup		Other		Total	
Club	Season	Division	Apps	Goals	Apps	Goals	Apps	Goals	Apps	Goals
Seongnam FC	2020	K League 1	10	0	2	0	—		12	0
Seongnam FC	2021	K League 1	22	1	2	0	—		24	1
Seongnam FC	2022	K League 1	23	0	2	0	—		25	0
Busan IPark	2023	K League 2	26	1	1	1	—		27	2
Total			81	2	7	1	—		88	3
Career total			81	2	7	1	0	0	88	3
