= Lee Han-do =

South Korean footballer (born 1994)

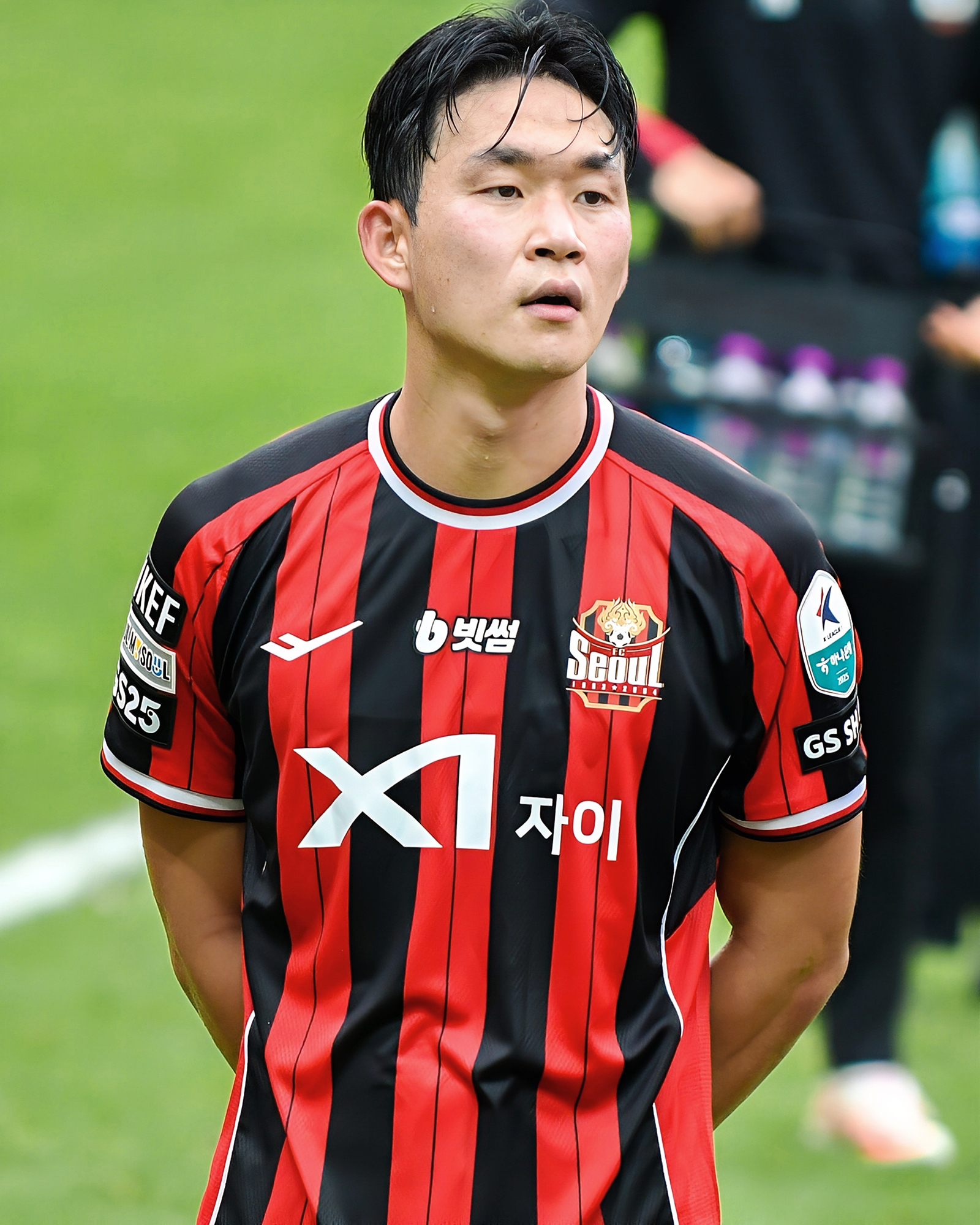
- Lee in 2025

Personal information
- Full name: Lee Han-do
- Date of birth: 16 March 1994 (age 32)
- Place of birth: Gimhae, South Korea
- Height: 1.85 m (6 ft 1 in)
- Position: Centre-back

Team information
- Current team: FC Seoul
- Number: 20

Senior career*
Years	Team	Apps	(Gls)
2016	Jeonbuk Hyundai Motors	0	(0)
2017–2021	Gwangju FC	118	(4)
2022	Suwon Samsung Bluewings	13	(0)
2022–	Busan IPark	59	(4)
2025–	FC Seoul	17	(0)
- * Club domestic league appearances and goals as of 14:39, 25 October 2026 (UTC)

Lee Han-do (Korean: 이한도; born 16 March 1994) is a South Korean professional footballer who plays as a centre-back for K League 1 club FC Seoul.

== Club career ==
Han-do joined FC Seoul on 5 January 2025.

== Honours ==
FC Seoul

- K League 1: 2026
