= Ryu Seung-woo =

South Korean footballer

Ryu Seung-woo 류승우
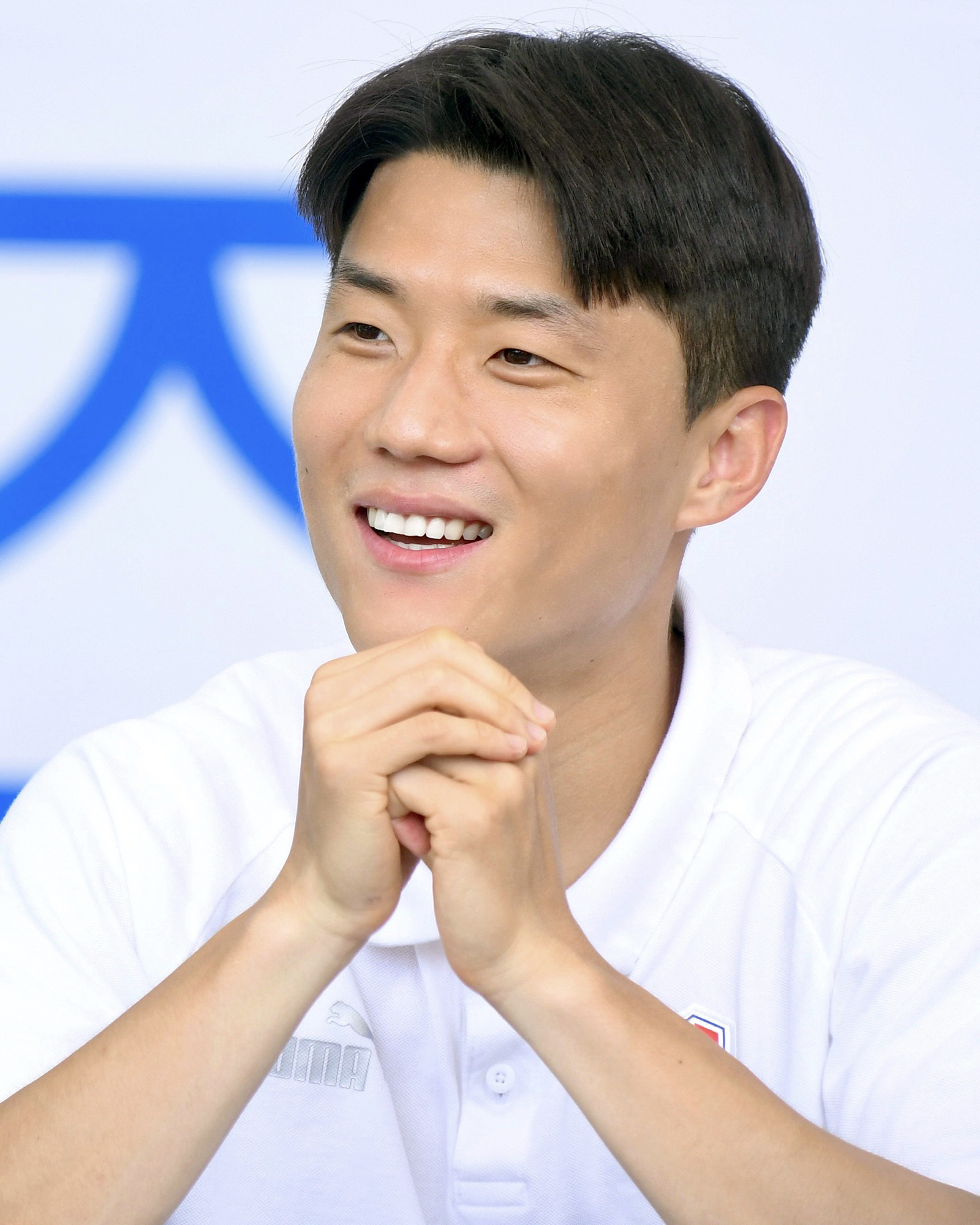
- Ryu with Suwon Samsung Bluewings in 2023

Personal information
- Date of birth: 17 December 1993 (age 32)
- Place of birth: Gimhae, South Korea
- Height: 1.71 m (5 ft 7 in)
- Positions: Attacking midfielder; winger

Team information
- Current team: Ansan Greeners
- Number: 7

Youth career
- 2012–2013: Chung-Ang University

Senior career*
Years	Team	Apps	(Gls)
2014	Jeju SK	0	(0)
2014	→ Bayer Leverkusen (loan)	2	(0)
2014–2017	Bayer Leverkusen	0	(0)
2014–2015	→ Eintracht Braunschweig (loan)	16	(4)
2016	→ Arminia Bielefeld (loan)	10	(0)
2016–2017	→ Ferencváros (loan)	11	(1)
2017–2021	Jeju SK	52	(4)
2019–2020	→ Gimcheon Sangmu (loan)	13	(1)
2022–2023	Suwon Samsung Bluewings	36	(2)
2023	FC Anyang	3	(0)
2024–2025	Khon Kaen United	25	(4)
2025–2026	Garudayaksa	13	(4)
2026–	Ansan Greeners	11	(2)

International career
2012–2013	South Korea U20	13	(3)
2014–2016	South Korea U23	26	(7)
- * Club domestic league appearances and goals as of 6 August 2026

- Ryu Seung-woo
- Hangul: 류승우
- Hanja: 柳承佑
- RR: Ryu Seungu
- MR: Ryu Sŭngu

Ryu Seung-woo (Korean: 류승우; born 17 December 1993) is a South Korean footballer who plays as an attacking midfielder or winger for K League 2 club Ansan Greeners.

== Club career ==
=== Bayer Leverkusen ===
Although Ryu signed his first professional contract with Jeju United from the K League on 6 November 2013 as a free agent, only a month later, without playing a single professional game in K-League, the Korean club loaned him out to Bayer Leverkusen for the purpose of his professional development. Before moving to Bundesliga, Ryu showed his credentials on the international stage, scoring a couple of goals to help South Korea into the knockout round of the 2013 FIFA U-20 World Cup in Turkey. Ryu grabbed his first goal for Bayer Leverkusen in the second half of an hour-long friendly against Dutch side SC Heerenveen. Bayer Leverkusen's skipper Simon Rolfes praised Ryu for his "intelligent play, good movement and use of space." On 25 January 2014, Ryu made his first official Bundesliga debut against SC Freiburg, substituting his South Korean compatriot Son Heung-Min in the second half. Unfortunately, the game ended in a 3–2 defeat for Leverkusen.

==== Eintracht Braunschweig (loan) ====
On 15 August 2014, Ryu joined Eintracht Braunschweig on a half-season long loan to replace the injured Jan Hochscheidt. The loan spell was extended for another six months in December 2014.

==== Arminia Bielefeld (loan) ====
He was loaned to Arminia Bielefeld on 1 February 2016.

==== Ferencváros (loan) ====
He was loaned to Ferencvárosi TC on 1 August 2016.

=== Return to Jeju united ===
In July 2017 Ryu signed again with his boyhood club Jeju United.

== International career ==
Ryu plays in the South Korea U20 football team. He was called up for South Korea's 21-man squad for the 2013 FIFA U-20 World Cup in Turkey, and scored the winning goal against Cuba in the side's opening match of the tournament. On 24 June 2013, Ryu netted an equalizer in South Korea's 2–2 draw against Portugal. On 27 June 2013, Ryu was injured and substituted during South Korea's final game of the group stage against Nigeria, forcing him to miss out their Round of 16 match against Colombia, and subsequently, their quarter-final loss against Iraq.

== Honours ==
South Korea U20

- AFC U-19 Championship: 2012
