= Jeong Ho-jin =

South Korean footballer (born 1999)

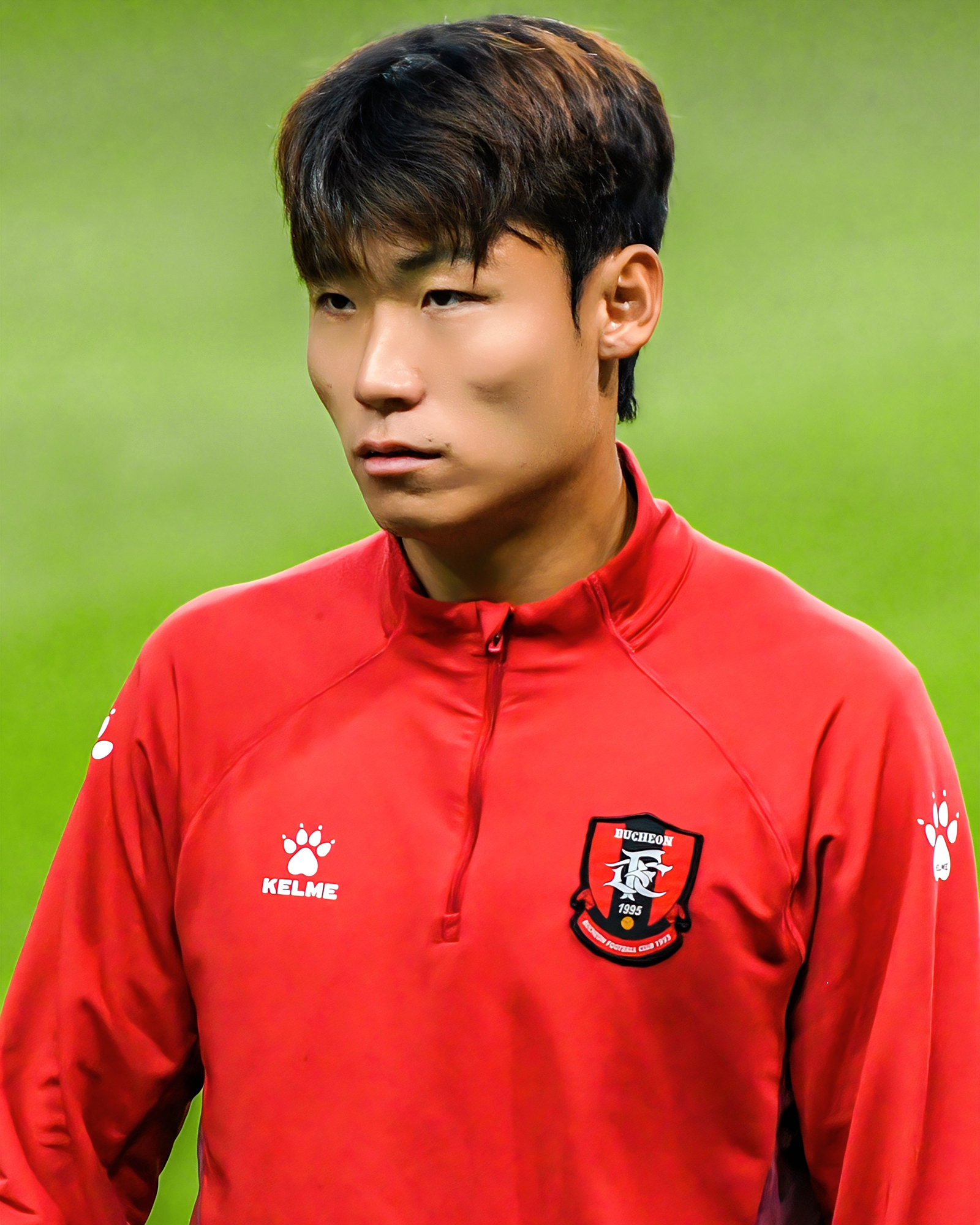
- Jeong in 2026

Personal information
- Date of birth: 6 August 1999 (age 27)
- Place of birth: South Korea
- Height: 1.82 m (6 ft 0 in)
- Position: Midfielder

Team information
- Current team: Bucheon FC 1995
- Number: 6

Youth career
- 2009: Seocho FCMB
- 2010–2011: Seoul Jamwon Elementary School
- 2012–2014: Doonchon Middle School
- 2015–2017: Yeongdeungpo High School
- 2018–2019: Korea University

Senior career*
| Years | Team | Apps | (Gls) |
| 2020–2023 | Jeonnam Dragons | 38 | (0) |
| 2022 | → Suwon Samsung Bluewings (loan) | 2 | (0) |
| 2024– | Bucheon FC 1995 | 64 | (0) |

International career
| 2017–2019 | South Korea U20 | 28 | (1) |
- * Club domestic league appearances and goals as of 4 August 2026

- Jeong Ho-jin
- Hangul: 정호진
- RR: Jeong Hojin
- MR: Chŏng Hojin

Jeong Ho-jin (Korean: 정호진; born 6 August 1999) is a South Korean footballer who plays as a midfielder for Bucheon FC 1995.

== Career statistics ==
=== Club ===
As of 14 August 2022

Appearances and goals by club, season and competition
| Club | Season | League | | | National cup | | Continental | | Total | |
| Club | Season | Division | Apps | Goals | Apps | Goals | Apps | Goals | Apps | Goals |
|---|---|---|---|---|---|---|---|---|---|---|
| Jeonnam Dragons | 2020 | K League 2 | 12 | 0 | 2 | 0 | 0 | 0 | 14 | 0 |
| Jeonnam Dragons | 2021 | K League 2 | 13 | 0 | 2 | 0 | 0 | 0 | 15 | 0 |
| Jeonnam Dragons | 2022 | K League 2 | 10 | 0 | 0 | 0 | 4 | 0 | 14 | 0 |
| Suwon Samsung Bluewings | 2022 | K League 1 | 2 | 0 | 0 | 0 | 0 | 0 | 2 | 0 |
| Career total | | | 37 | 0 | 4 | 0 | 4 | 0 | 45 | 0 |
