= 2022 K League 1 =

40th season of the top division of professional football in South Korea

Hana 1Q K League 1
- Season: 2022
- Dates: 19 February – 29 October 2022
- Champions: Ulsan Hyundai (3rd title)
- Relegated: Gimcheon Sangmu; Seongnam FC
- Champions League: Ulsan Hyundai; Jeonbuk Hyundai Motors; Pohang Steelers; Incheon United
- Matches: 228
- Best player: Lee Chung-yong
- Top goalscorer: Cho Gue-sung; Joo Min-kyu (17 goals each)

The 2022 K League 1, also known as the Hana 1Q K League 1 for sponsorship reasons, was the 40th season of the top division of professional football in South Korea, and the tenth season of the K League 1.

After progressing 33 regular rounds as ever, the league was divided into two groups, the top six and the bottom six, and each team played five matches against other teams in its group.

== Teams ==
=== Team changes ===
Relegated to K League 2

- Gwangju FC

Promoted from K League 2

- Gimcheon Sangmu

=== Locations ===
Locations of the 2022 K League 1 teams
Locations of the 2022 K League 1 teams in the Seoul Capital Area

The following twelve clubs will compete in the K League 1 during the 2022 season.

Team	City/Province	Abbreviation
Daegu FC	Daegu	Daegu
Gangwon FC	Gangwon	Gangwon
Gimcheon Sangmu	Gimcheon	Gimcheon
Incheon United	Incheon	Incheon
Jeju United	Jeju	Jeju
Jeonbuk Hyundai Motors	Jeonbuk	Jeonbuk
Pohang Steelers	Pohang	Pohang
Seongnam FC	Seongnam	Seongnam
FC Seoul	Seoul	Seoul
Suwon FC	Suwon	Suwon FC
Suwon Samsung Bluewings	Suwon	Suwon
Ulsan Hyundai	Ulsan	Ulsan

=== Stadiums ===
Jeju United	Daegu FC	Incheon United
Jeju World Cup Stadium	DGB Daegu Bank Park	Incheon Football Stadium
Capacity: **29,791**	Capacity: **12,415**	Capacity: **20,891**
Pohang Steelers	Suwon FC	Seongnam FC
Pohang Steel Yard	Suwon Stadium	Tancheon Stadium
Capacity: **17,443**	Capacity: **11,808**	Capacity: **16,146**
FC Seoul	Ulsan Hyundai	Suwon Samsung Bluewings
Seoul World Cup Stadium	Ulsan Munsu Football Stadium	Suwon World Cup Stadium
Capacity: **66,704**	Capacity: **44,102**	Capacity: **44,031**
Gimcheon Sangmu	Jeonbuk Hyundai Motors	
Gimcheon Stadium	Jeonju World Cup Stadium	
Capacity: **25,000**	Capacity: **42,477**	
Gangwon FC		
Chuncheon Songam Leports Town	Gangneung Stadium	
Capacity: **20,000**	Capacity: **22,333**	

=== Personnel and sponsoring ===
Team	Manager	Main sponsor	Kit manufacturer	Other sponsor(s)
Daegu FC	(South Korea) Choi Won-kwon (caretaker)	Daegu Government	Goal Studio	DGB Daegu Bank; AJIN Industrial Co., Ltd.
Gangwon FC	(South Korea) Choi Yong-soo	Gangwon Provincial Government	Fila	Kangwon Land
Gimcheon Sangmu	(South Korea) Kim Tae-wan	Republic of Korea Armed Forces; Gimcheon Government	Kelme	
Incheon United	(South Korea) Jo Sung-hwan	Incheon Government	Macron	Shinhan Bank; Incheon International Airport
Jeju United	(South Korea) Nam Ki-il	SK Energy	Fila	
Jeonbuk Hyundai Motors	(South Korea) Kim Sang-sik	Hyundai Motor Company	Adidas	
Pohang Steelers	(South Korea) Kim Gi-dong	POSCO	Puma	Pohang Government
Seongnam FC	(South Korea) Chung Kyung-ho (caretaker)	Seongnam Government	Umbro	
FC Seoul	(South Korea) An Ik-soo	GS Group	Pro-Specs	
Suwon Samsung Bluewings	(South Korea) Lee Byung-keun	Cheil Worldwide	Puma	Samsung Electronics
Suwon FC	(South Korea) Kim Do-kyun	Suwon Government	Hummel	
Ulsan Hyundai	(South Korea) Hong Myung-bo	Hyundai Heavy Industries	Adidas	Hyundai Oil Bank

=== Foreign players ===
Restricting the number of foreign players strictly to five per team, including a slot for a player from the Asian Football Confederation countries and a slot for a player from the Association of Southeast Asian Nations. Gimcheon Sangmu FC, being a military-owned team, is not allowed to sign any foreign players. A team could use five foreign players on the field each game, including at least one player from the AFC confederation.

North Korean player An Byong-jun was deemed as a native player in K League by South Korean law and passport.

Players in bold were registered during the mid-season transfer window.

Team	Player 1	Player 2	Player 3	AFC player	ASEAN player (Note: Did not exist in the regulation of AFC.)	Former player(s)
Daegu FC	(Brazil) Césinha	(Brazil) Zeca	(Brazil) **Daniel Penha**	(Japan) Keita Suzuki		(Brazil) Edgar (Brazil) Lamas
Gangwon FC	(Sweden) Kevin Höög Jansson	(Montenegro) **Balša Sekulić**	(Brazil) **Galego**			(Montenegro) Dino Islamović (Bulgaria) Momchil Tsvetanov (Japan) Yuki Kobayashi
Incheon United	(Costa Rica) Elías Aguilar	(Brazil) **Hernandes**		(Australia) Harrison Delbridge		(Montenegro) Stefan Mugoša
Jeju United	(Guinea-Bissau) Gerso Fernandes	(Sweden) Jonathan Ring				(Poland) Oskar Zawada
Jeonbuk Hyundai Motors	(The Gambia) Modou Barrow	(Brazil) Gustavo				(Russia) Stanislav Iljutcenko (Japan) Takahiro Kunimoto
Pohang Steelers	(Brazil) Wanderson			(Australia) Alex Grant		(Colombia) Manuel Palacios (Nigeria) Moses Ogbu
Seongnam FC	(Serbia) Fejsal Mulić	(Colombia) Manuel Palacios	(Montenegro) **Miloš Raičković**			
FC Seoul	(Spain) Osmar	(Serbia) Aleksandar Paločević	(Russia) **Stanislav Iljutcenko**	(Japan) **Keijiro Ogawa**		(Brazil) Ricardo Silva (Australia) Ben Halloran
Suwon Samsung Bluewings	(Netherlands) Dave Bulthuis	(Bosnia and Herzegovina) Elvis Sarić	(North Korea) **An Byong-jun** (Note: Deemed as a native player in K League.)	(Japan) **Manabu Saitō**		(Denmark) Sebastian Grønning
Suwon FC	(South Africa) Lars Veldwijk	(Brazil) Murilo	(Finland) Urho Nissilä	(Australia) Lachlan Jackson		
Ulsan Hyundai	(Georgia (country)) Valeri Qazaishvili	(Brazil) Leonardo	(Hungary) **Martin Ádám**	(Japan) Jun Amano		(Hungary) Márk Koszta

== League table ==
Pos	Team	Pld	W	D	L	GF	GA	GD	Pts	Qualification or relegation (Note: Teams played each other three times (33 matches), before the league was split into two groups, the top six and the bottom six.)
1	Ulsan Hyundai (C)	38	22	10	6	57	33	+24	76	Qualification for Champions League group stage
2	Jeonbuk Hyundai Motors	38	21	10	7	56	36	+20	73	Qualification for Champions League group stage
3	Pohang Steelers	38	16	12	10	52	41	+11	60	Qualification for Champions League group stage
4	Incheon United	38	13	15	10	46	42	+4	54	Qualification for Champions League play-off round
5	Jeju United	38	14	10	14	52	50	+2	52	
6	Gangwon FC	38	14	7	17	50	52	−2	49	
7	Suwon FC	38	13	9	16	56	63	−7	48	
8	Daegu FC	38	10	16	12	52	59	−7	46	
9	FC Seoul	38	11	13	14	43	47	−4	46	
10	Suwon Samsung Bluewings (O)	38	11	11	16	44	49	−5	44	Qualification for relegation play-offs
11	Gimcheon Sangmu (R)	38	8	14	16	45	48	−3	38	Qualification for relegation play-offs
12	Seongnam FC (R)	38	7	9	22	37	70	−33	30	Relegation to K League 2

Source: Soccerway
Rules for classification: 1) Points; 2) Goals scored; 3) Goal difference; 4) Wins; 5) Head-to-head points
(C) Champions; (O) Play-off winners; (R) Relegated

== Positions by matchday ==
Leaders
Qualification for Champions League group stage
Qualification for Champions League play-off round
Qualification for relegation play-offs
Relegation to K League 2

=== Round 1–33 ===
Team ╲ Round	1	2	3	4	5	6	7	8	9	10	11	12	13	14	15	16	17	18	19	20	21	22	23	24	25	26	27	28	29	30	31	32	33
Ulsan Hyundai	6	3	1	1	1	1	1	1	1	1	1	1	1	1	1	1	1	1	1	1	1	1	1	1	1	1	1	1	1	1	1	1	1
Jeonbuk Hyundai Motors	4	5	7	9	11	11	8	6	4	6	5	5	3	2	3	3	2	2	2	2	2	2	2	2	2	2	2	2	2	2	2	2	2
Pohang Steelers	1	7	3	2	2	4	4	3	3	3	2	4	5	4	5	4	5	5	3	3	3	3	3	3	3	3	3	3	3	3	3	3	3
Incheon United	4	5	2	5	3	2	2	2	2	2	4	3	4	5	4	5	4	4	5	5	5	5	5	5	4	5	4	4	4	4	4	4	4
Jeju United	12	10	9	7	4	3	3	5	5	4	3	2	2	3	2	2	3	3	4	4	4	4	4	4	5	4	5	5	5	5	5	5	5
Gangwon FC	2	3	6	4	7	5	7	7	8	9	10	11	10	10	10	11	11	10	9	10	8	7	8	7	7	7	8	7	6	7	6	7	6
Suwon FC	8	11	12	12	10	8	9	9	7	7	9	10	11	11	11	10	8	8	8	6	6	6	6	6	6	6	6	6	7	6	7	6	7
FC Seoul	2	1	4	6	8	10	11	10	8	8	7	6	6	7	7	6	7	7	7	8	9	9	7	8	8	8	7	8	8	8	8	8	8
Daegu FC	10	9	8	10	6	7	6	8	10	11	8	8	9	6	6	7	6	6	6	7	7	8	9	9	9	9	10	10	11	11	11	10	9
Gimcheon Sangmu	6	2	5	3	5	5	5	4	6	5	6	7	7	9	9	9	9	9	10	9	10	10	10	11	10	11	11	11	10	10	10	11	10
Suwon Samsung Bluewings	8	8	10	8	8	9	10	11	11	10	11	9	8	8	8	8	10	11	11	11	11	11	11	10	11	10	9	9	9	9	9	9	11
Seongnam FC	10	12	11	11	12	12	12	12	12	12	12	12	12	12	12	12	12	12	12	12	12	12	12	12	12	12	12	12	12	12	12	12	12

Source: K League

=== Round 34–38 ===
Team ╲ Round	34	35	36	37	38
Ulsan Hyundai	1	1	1	1	1
Jeonbuk Hyundai Motors	2	2	2	2	2
Pohang Steelers	3	3	3	3	3
Incheon United	4	4	4	4	4
Jeju United	6	6	5	5	5
Gangwon FC	5	5	6	6	6
Suwon FC	7	7	7	7	7
Daegu FC	9	9	8	8	8
FC Seoul	8	8	9	9	9
Suwon Samsung Bluewings	10	10	10	10	10
Gimcheon Sangmu	11	11	11	11	11
Seongnam FC	12	12	12	12	12

Source: K League

== Results ==
=== Matches 1–22 ===
Teams played each other twice, once at home, once away.

Home \ Away	DGU	GWN	GCS	ICU	JJU	JHM	PHS	SNM	SEL	SSB	SWN	USH
Daegu FC	—	3–0	1–0	1–2	1–0	1–1	2–2	3–1	0–2	3–0	0–0	1–1
Gangwon FC	2–0	—	3–2	0–1	4–2	1–2	1–1	2–0	1–0	1–1	0–2	1–3
Gimcheon Sangmu	1–1	1–0	—	0–1	4–0	1–2	3–2	1–1	2–0	1–1	0–1	0–2
Incheon United	2–2	4–1	1–0	—	2–2	0–1	0–1	1–0	1–1	1–0	0–1	1–1
Jeju United	0–0	0–0	3–1	2–1	—	2–0	0–3	3–2	2–2	0–0	0–0	1–2
Jeonbuk Hyundai Motors	1–1	1–1	1–1	2–2	0–2	—	0–1	3–2	1–1	2–1	1–0	0–1
Pohang Steelers	1–1	3–1	1–1	2–0	1–1	0–1	—	1–0	1–1	1–0	2–0	2–0
Seongnam FC	1–1	0–2	0–3	0–1	1–2	0–4	1–4	—	0–0	2–2	2–2	0–2
FC Seoul	2–1	2–2	2–2	1–1	1–2	0–1	1–0	0–1	—	2–0	3–1	1–2
Suwon Samsung Bluewings	1–1	2–2	2–1	0–0	0–1	0–1	1–1	1–0	0–1	—	1–0	1–0
Suwon FC	4–3	2–4	3–2	2–2	1–3	0–1	1–0	3–4	4–3	3–0	—	1–2
Ulsan Hyundai	3–1	2–1	0–0	2–2	1–0	1–3	2–0	0–0	2–1	2–1	2–1	—

Source: K League
Legend: Blue = home team win; Yellow = draw; Red = away team win.

=== Matches 23–33 ===
Teams played each other once, either at home or away.

Home \ Away	DGU	GWN	GCS	ICU	JJU	JHM	PHS	SNM	SEL	SSB	SWN	USH
Daegu FC	—	—	0–0	2–3	—	0–5	—	1–0	3–0	1–2	—	—
Gangwon FC	1–0	—	0–1	—	2–1	2–1	—	—	—	—	2–3	—
Gimcheon Sangmu	—	—	—	1–0	1–2	2–2	0–1	—	1–2	—	—	1–2
Incheon United	—	0–1	—	—	—	3–1	—	—	2–0	—	1–1	0–0
Jeju United	2–2	—	—	0–1	—	—	5–0	1–2	—	1–2	—	1–1
Jeonbuk Hyundai Motors	—	—	—	—	1–0	—	2–2	1–0	0–0	—	—	1–1
Pohang Steelers	4–1	2–1	—	1–1	—	—	—	—	1–2	—	—	—
Seongnam FC	—	0–4	1–4	3–1	—	—	1–1	—	—	—	2–1	2–0
FC Seoul	—	1–0	—	—	0–2	—	—	2–0	—	1–3	2–2	—
Suwon Samsung Bluewings	—	2–3	0–0	3–3	—	2–3	0–2	4–1	—	—	—	—
Suwon FC	2–2	—	2–1	—	2–2	0–1	1–0	—	—	4–2	—	—
Ulsan Hyundai	4–0	2–1	—	—	—	—	1–2	—	1–1	1–0	2–0	—

Source: K League
Legend: Blue = home team win; Yellow = draw; Red = away team win.

=== Matches 34–38 ===
Teams played each other once, either at home or away.

==== Final A ====
Home \ Away	GWN	ICU	JJU	JHM	PHS	USH
Gangwon FC	—	0–0	—	—	—	1–2
Incheon United	—	—	3–1	—	1–1	0–3
Jeju United	1–2	—	—	1–2	—	—
Jeonbuk Hyundai Motors	1–0	2–1	—	—	3–1	—
Pohang Steelers	1–0	—	1–2	—	—	1–1
Ulsan Hyundai	—	—	1–2	2–1	—	—

Source: K League
Legend: Blue = home team win; Yellow = draw; Red = away team win.

==== Final B ====
Home \ Away	DGU	GCS	SNM	SEL	SSB	SWN
Daegu FC	—	1–1	—	—	—	2–1
Gimcheon Sangmu	—	—	1–1	—	1–3	—
Seongnam FC	4–4	—	—	—	0–2	—
FC Seoul	2–3	1–1	0–1	—	—	—
Suwon Samsung Bluewings	1–2	—	—	0–0	—	3–0
Suwon FC	—	2–2	2–1	0–2	—	—

Source: K League
Legend: Blue = home team win; Yellow = draw; Red = away team win.

== Relegation play-offs ==
The tenth-placed team and the eleventh-placed team played against the play-offs winners and the runners-up of the K League 2, respectively, in the relegation play-offs.

Team 1	Agg.	Team 2	1st leg	2nd leg
FC Anyang	1–2	Suwon Samsung Bluewings	0–0	1–2 (a.e.t.)
Daejeon Hana Citizen	6–1	Gimcheon Sangmu	2–1	4–0

26 October 2022
19:30 UTC+9

FC Anyang	0–0	Suwon Samsung Bluewings
	Report

Anyang Stadium, Anyang
Attendance: 4,863
Referee: Kim Jong-hyeok
29 October 2022
14:00 UTC+9

Suwon Samsung Bluewings	2–1 (a.e.t.)	FC Anyang
An Byong-jun 17'; Oh Hyeon-gyu 120'	Report	Acosty 55'

Suwon World Cup Stadium, Suwon
Attendance: 12,842
Referee: Lee Dong-jun

Suwon Samsung Bluewings won 2–1 on aggregate and therefore both clubs remain in their respective leagues.

26 October 2022
19:30 UTC+9

Daejeon Hana Citizen	2–1	Gimcheon Sangmu
Cho Yu-min 36'; Ju Se-jong 74'	Report	Mun Ji-hwan 22'

Daejeon World Cup Stadium, Daejeon
Attendance: 8,545
Referee: Lee Dong-jun
29 October 2022
16:00 UTC+9

Gimcheon Sangmu	0–4	Daejeon Hana Citizen
	Report	Lee Jin-hyun 31', 53'; Kim In-gyun 74'; Kim Seung-sub 84'

Gimcheon Stadium, Gimcheon
Attendance: 2,918
Referee: Kim Jong-hyeok

Daejeon Hana Citizen won 6–1 on aggregate and was promoted to K League 1, while Gimcheon Sangmu was relegated to K League 2.

== Statistics ==
=== Top goalscorers ===
Cho Gue-sung, who appeared in less matches than Joo Min-kyu, won the top goalscorer award.

Rank	Player	Club	Goals
1	(South Korea) Cho Gue-sung	Gimcheon Sangmu; Jeonbuk Hyundai Motors	17
1	(South Korea) Joo Min-kyu	Jeju United	17
3	(Montenegro) Stefan Mugoša	Incheon United	14
3	(South Korea) Lee Seung-woo	Suwon FC	14
5	(The Gambia) Modou Barrow	Jeonbuk Hyundai Motors	13
5	(South Korea) Go Jae-hyun	Daegu FC	13
5	(South Korea) Oh Hyeon-gyu	Suwon Samsung Bluewings	13
8	(Brazil) Césinha	Daegu FC	12
8	(South Korea) Um Won-sang	Ulsan Hyundai	12
8	(South Korea) Kim Dae-won	Gangwon FC	12

=== Top assist providers ===
Rank	Player	Club	Assists
1	(South Korea) Lee Ki-je	Suwon Samsung Bluewings	14
2	(South Korea) Kim Dae-won	Gangwon FC	13
3	(South Korea) Sin Jin-ho	Pohang Steelers	10
4	(Brazil) Zeca	Daegu FC	7
4	(South Africa) Lars Veldwijk	Suwon FC	7
4	(South Korea) Joo Min-kyu	Jeju United	7
4	(Guinea-Bissau) Gerso Fernandes	Jeju United	7
4	(South Korea) Lee Yeong-jae	Gimcheon Sangmu	7
4	(South Korea) Cho Young-wook	FC Seoul	7
10	(The Gambia) Modou Barrow	Jeonbuk Hyundai Motors	6
10	(Brazil) Césinha	Daegu FC	6
10	(South Korea) Um Won-sang	Ulsan Hyundai	6

=== Hat-tricks ===
Player	For	Against	Result	Date
(South Korea) Joo Min-kyu	Jeju United	Gimcheon Sangmu	3–1	8 May 2022
(Montenegro) Stefan Mugoša	Incheon United	Gangwon FC	4–1	22 June 2022

== Awards ==
=== Weekly awards ===
Round	Player of the Round	
Round	Player	Club
1	(South Korea) Lim Sang-hyub	Pohang Steelers
2	(Japan) Jun Amano	Ulsan Hyundai
3	(South Korea) Jeong Jae-hee	Pohang Steelers
4	(South Korea) Cho Gue-sung	Gimcheon Sangmu
5	(Brazil) Edgar	Daegu FC
6	(South Korea) Lee Seung-woo	Suwon FC
7	(South Korea) Park Soo-il	Seongnam FC
8	(South Korea) Sin Jin-ho	Pohang Steelers
9	(South Korea) Lee Seung-woo	Suwon FC
10	(Bosnia and Herzegovina) Elvis Sarić	Suwon Samsung Bluewings
11	(South Korea) Um Won-sang	Ulsan Hyundai
12	(South Korea) Lee Chang-min	Jeju United
13	(South Korea) Jeon Jin-woo	Suwon Samsung Bluewings
14	(South Korea) Jeong Jae-hee	Pohang Steelers
15	(South Korea) Joo Min-kyu	Jeju United
16	(Japan) Takahiro Kunimoto	Jeonbuk Hyundai Motors
17	(Montenegro) Stefan Mugoša	Incheon United
18	(South Korea) Kim Dae-won	Gangwon FC
19	(South Korea) Kim Seung-dae	Pohang Steelers

Round	Player of the Round	
Round	Player	Club
20	(South Korea) Heo Yong-joon	Pohang Steelers
21	(South Korea) Jung Jae-yong	Suwon FC
22	(South Korea) Yang Hyun-jun	Gangwon FC
23	(Colombia) Manuel Palacios	Seongnam FC
24	(Hungary) Martin Ádám	Ulsan Hyundai
25	(South Korea) Park Soo-il	Seongnam FC
26	(Serbia) Fejsal Mulić	Seongnam FC
27	(South Korea) Kim Hyun	Suwon FC
28	(South Korea) Jeon Jin-woo	Suwon Samsung Bluewings
29	(South Korea) Sin Jin-ho	Pohang Steelers
30	(Brazil) Zeca	Daegu FC
31	(The Gambia) Modou Barrow	Jeonbuk Hyundai Motors
32	(South Korea) Lee Seung-woo	Suwon FC
33	(South Korea) Kim Young-bin	Gangwon FC
34	(Brazil) Césinha	Daegu FC
35	(Hungary) Martin Ádám	Ulsan Hyundai
36	(Brazil) Césinha	Daegu FC
37	(Hungary) Martin Ádám	Ulsan Hyundai
38	(South Korea) Cho Gue-sung	Jeonbuk Hyundai Motors

=== Monthly Awards ===
Month	Player of the Month		Young Player of the Month		Manager of the Month		
Month	Player	Club	Player	Club	Manager	Club	Div.
February/March	(Montenegro) Stefan Mugoša	Incheon	(South Korea) Jeon Seong-soo	Seongnam	(South Korea) Hong Myung-bo	Ulsan	1
April	(Montenegro) Stefan Mugoša	Incheon	(South Korea) Yang Hyun-jun	Gangwon	(South Korea) Lee Jung-hyo	Gwangju	2
May	(Brazil) Cesinha	Daegu	(South Korea) Hwang Jae-won	Daegu	(South Korea) Nam Ki-il	Jeju	1
June	(South Korea) Lee Seung-woo	Suwon FC	(South Korea) Yang Hyun-jun	Gangwon	(South Korea) Kim Do-kyun	Suwon FC	1
July	(Brazil) Gustavo	Jeonbuk	(South Korea) Yang Hyun-jun	Gangwon	(South Korea) Kim Sang-sik	Jeonbuk	1
August	(Brazil) Hernandes	Incheon	(South Korea) Kim Jin-ho	Gangwon	(South Korea) Jo Sung-hwan	Incheon	1
September	(The Gambia) Modou Barrow	Jeonbuk	(South Korea) Yang Hyun-jun	Gangwon	(South Korea) Lee Jung-hyo	Gwangju	2
October	(Brazil) Cesinha	Daegu	(South Korea) Hong Si-hoo	Incheon	(South Korea) Choi Won-kwon	Daegu	1

Month	Goal of the Month (Note: Officially known as the "G Moment Award".)		Performance of the Month	
Month	Player	Club	Player	Club
February	(Japan) Jun Amano	Ulsan	—	
March	(South Korea) Cho Gue-sung	Gimcheon	—	
April	(South Korea) Kim Gyeong-min	Gimcheon	—	
May	(South Korea) Joo Min-kyu	Jeju	(South Korea) Lee Seung-woo	Suwon FC
June	(South Korea) Lee Seung-woo	Suwon FC	(South Korea) Choi Young-jun	Jeju
July	(South Korea) Yang Hyun-jun	Gangwon	(South Korea) Yang Hyun-jun	Gangwon
August	(South Korea) Kim Hyun	Suwon FC	(South Korea) Jeon Jin-woo	Suwon
September	(South Korea) Oh Hyeon-gyu	Suwon	(South Korea) Sin Jin-ho	Pohang
October	(South Korea) Um Won-sang	Ulsan	—	

=== Annual awards ===
The 2022 K League Awards was held on 24 October 2022.

Award	Winner	Club
Most Valuable Player	(South Korea) Lee Chung-yong	Ulsan Hyundai
Young Player of the Year	(South Korea) Yang Hyun-jun	Gangwon FC
Top goalscorer	(South Korea) Cho Gue-sung	Gimcheon Sangmu; Jeonbuk Hyundai Motors
Top assist provider	(South Korea) Lee Ki-je	Suwon Samsung Bluewings
Manager of the Year	(South Korea) Hong Myung-bo	Ulsan Hyundai

Position	Best XI			
Goalkeeper	(South Korea) Jo Hyeon-woo (Ulsan)			
Defenders	(South Korea) Kim Tae-hwan (Ulsan)	(South Korea) Park Jin-seob (Jeonbuk)	(South Korea) Kim Young-gwon (Ulsan)	(South Korea) Kim Jin-su (Jeonbuk)
Midfielders	(South Korea) Lee Chung-yong (Ulsan)	(Brazil) Cesinha (Daegu)	(South Korea) Sin Jin-ho (Pohang)	(South Korea) Kim Dae-won (Gangwon)
Forwards	(South Korea) Joo Min-kyu (Jeju)		(South Korea) Cho Gue-sung (Gimcheon, Jeonbuk)	

== See also ==
- 2022 in South Korean football
- 2022 Korean FA Cup
