= 2023 K League 1 =

41st season of the top division of professional football in South Korea

Hana 1Q K League 1
- Season: 2023
- Dates: 25 February – 3 December 2023
- Champions: Ulsan Hyundai (4th title)
- Relegated: Suwon Samsung Bluewings
- Champions League Elite: Ulsan Hyundai; Pohang Steelers; Gwangju FC
- Champions League Two: Jeonbuk Hyundai Motors
- Matches: 174
- Goals: 447 (2.57 per match)
- Best player: Kim Young-gwon
- Top goalscorer: Joo Min-kyu; Tiago Orobó (17 goals each)
- Biggest home win: Gwangju 5–0 Incheon (18 March 2023)
- Biggest away win: Suwon FC 0–5 Jeju (14 May 2023)
- Highest scoring: Seoul 7–2 Suwon FC (12 July 2023)
- Longest winning run: 6 matches Ulsan Hyundai
- Longest unbeaten run: 9 matches Gwangju FC; Pohang Steelers
- Longest winless run: 15 matches Gangwon FC
- Longest losing run: 5 matches Suwon Samsung Bluewings
- Highest attendance: 45,007; Seoul 3–0 Daegu (8 April 2023)

The 2023 K League 1, also known as the Hana 1Q K League 1 for sponsorship reasons, was the 41st season of the top division of professional football in South Korea, and the eleventh season of the K League 1. Defending champions Ulsan Hyundai successfully defended their title.

After progressing 33 regular rounds as ever, the league was divided into two groups, the top six and the bottom six, and each team played five matches against other teams in its group.

== Teams ==
=== Team changes ===
Gwangju FC and Daejeon Hana Citizen (both promoted after absences of one and seven years, respectively) were promoted from the 2022 K League 2. Gimcheon Sangmu and Seongnam FC (both relegated after one and four years in the top flight, respectively) were relegated to 2023 K League 2.

▲ Promoted from K League 2	▼ Relegated to K League 2
Gwangju FC; Daejeon Hana Citizen	Gimcheon Sangmu; Seongnam FC

=== Locations ===
Locations of the 2023 K League 1 teams
Locations of the 2023 K League 1 teams in the Seoul Capital Area

The following twelve clubs competed in the K League 1 during the 2023 season.

Team	City/Province	Abbreviation
Daegu FC	Daegu	Daegu
Daejeon Hana Citizen	Daejeon	Daejeon
Gangwon FC	Gangwon	Gangwon
Gwangju FC	Gwangju	Gwangju
Incheon United	Incheon	Incheon
Jeju United	Jeju	Jeju
Jeonbuk Hyundai Motors	Jeonbuk	Jeonbuk
Pohang Steelers	Pohang	Pohang
FC Seoul	Seoul	Seoul
Suwon Samsung Bluewings	Suwon	Suwon
Suwon FC	Suwon	Suwon FC
Ulsan Hyundai	Ulsan	Ulsan

=== Stadiums ===
Jeju United	Daegu FC	Incheon United
Jeju World Cup Stadium	DGB Daegu Bank Park	Incheon Football Stadium
Capacity: **29,791**	Capacity: **12,415**	Capacity: **20,891**
Pohang Steelers	Suwon FC	Daejeon Hana Citizen
Pohang Steel Yard	Suwon Stadium	Daejeon World Cup Stadium
Capacity: **17,443**	Capacity: **11,808**	Capacity: **40,903**
FC Seoul	Ulsan Hyundai	Suwon Samsung Bluewings
Seoul World Cup Stadium	Ulsan Munsu Football Stadium	Suwon World Cup Stadium
Capacity: **66,704**	Capacity: **44,102**	Capacity: **44,031**
Gwangju FC	Jeonbuk Hyundai Motors	
Gwangju Football Stadium	Jeonju World Cup Stadium	
Capacity: **10,007**	Capacity: **42,477**	
Gangwon FC		
Chuncheon Songam Leports Town	Gangneung Stadium	
Capacity: **20,000**	Capacity: **22,333**	

=== Personnel and sponsoring ===
Team	Manager	Main sponsor	Kit manufacturer	Other sponsor(s)
Daegu FC	(South Korea) Choi Won-kwon	Daegu Government	Goal Studio	DGB Daegu Bank; AJIN Industrial Co., Ltd.
Daejeon Hana Citizen	(South Korea) Lee Min-sung	Hana Financial Group	Astore	
Gangwon FC	(South Korea) Yoon Jong-hwan	Gangwon Provincial Government	Fila	High1 Resort
Gwangju FC	(South Korea) Lee Jung-hyo	Gwangju Government	Kelme	
Incheon United	(South Korea) Jo Sung-hwan	Incheon Government	Macron	Shinhan Bank; Incheon International Airport
Jeju United	(South Korea) Nam Ki-il	SK Energy	Fila	
Jeonbuk Hyundai Motors	(Romania) Dan Petrescu	Hyundai Motor Company	Adidas	
Pohang Steelers	(South Korea) Kim Gi-dong	POSCO	Puma	Pohang Government
FC Seoul	(South Korea) An Ik-soo	GS Group	Pro-Specs	
Suwon Samsung Bluewings	(South Korea) Kim Byung-soo	Cheil Worldwide	Puma	Samsung Electronics; Deutsch Motors
Suwon FC	(South Korea) Kim Do-kyun	Suwon Government	Hummel	
Ulsan Hyundai	(South Korea) Hong Myung-bo	Hyundai Heavy Industries	Adidas	Hyundai Oil Bank

=== Foreign players ===
The number of allowed foreign players was kept strictly to six per team, including a guaranteed slot for a player from the Asian Football Confederation countries. Teams could field at most five foreign players at any given time, including at least one player from the AFC confederation.

North Korean player An Byong-jun, who played for Suwon Samsung Bluewings, was deemed as a native player by South Korean nationality law.

Players in bold were registered during the mid-season transfer window.

Team	Player 1	Player 2	Player 3	Player 4	Player 5	AFC player	Former player(s)
Daegu FC	(Brazil) Césinha	(Brazil) Edgar	(Brazil) Lucas Barcellos	(Brazil) **Victor Bobsin**		(Japan) Keita Suzuki	(Brazil) Daniel Penha (Brazil) Marcos Serrato
Daejeon Hana Citizen	(Azerbaijan) Anton Kryvotsyuk	(Brazil) Leandro Ribeiro	(Brazil) Tiago Orobó	(Latvia) **Vladislavs Gutkovskis**		(Japan) Masatoshi Ishida	
Gangwon FC	(Brazil) Galego	(Brazil) **Vitor Gabriel**	(Brazil) **Welinton Júnior**	(Brazil) **Yago Cariello**	(Montenegro) **Marko Tući**	(Uzbekistan) Ikromjon Alibaev	(Montenegro) Dino Islamović (Sweden) Kevin Höög Jansson
Gwangju FC	(Albania) Jasir Asani	(Brazil) Thomás Bedinelli	(Georgia (country)) **Beka Mikeltadze**	(Netherlands) Timo Letschert		(Australia) Aaron Calver	(Brazil) Sandro Lima
Incheon United	(Brazil) Hernandes	(Democratic Republic of the Congo) Paul-José M'Poku	(Guinea-Bissau) Gerso Fernandes	(Montenegro) **Stefan Mugoša**		(Australia) Harrison Delbridge	
Jeju United	(Brazil) Reis	(Brazil) Yuri	(Sweden) Jonathan Ring				
Jeonbuk Hyundai Motors	(Brazil) André Luis	(Brazil) Gustavo	(Brazil) Rafael Silva	(Czech Republic) **Tomáš Petrášek**	(Ghana) **Nana Boateng**	(Japan) Jun Amano	
Pohang Steelers	(Brazil) Oberdan	(Brazil) Wanderson	(Brazil) Zeca			(Australia) Alex Grant	
FC Seoul	(Brazil) Willyan	(Norway) **Bjørn Maars Johnsen**	(Russia) Stanislav Iljutcenko	(Serbia) Aleksandar Paločević	(Spain) Osmar	(Syria) Hosam Aiesh	
Suwon Samsung Bluewings	(Brazil) Rodrigo Bassani	(Brazil) **Werik Popó**	(Ghana) Boadu Maxwell Acosty	(Netherlands) Dave Bulthuis	(Serbia) Fejsal Mulić	(Japan) **Kazuki Kozuka**	
Suwon FC	(Brazil) **Hugo Gomes**	(Brazil) **Ricardo Lopes**	(Brazil) **Walterson**			(Australia) Lachlan Jackson	(Brazil) Luan Ferreira (Brazil) Murilo Henrique (South Africa) Lars Veldwijk
Ulsan Hyundai	(Georgia (country)) Valeri Qazaishvili	(Hungary) Martin Ádám	(Sweden) Darijan Bojanić	(Sweden) Gustav Ludwigson		(Japan) Ataru Esaka	

== League table ==
Pos	Team	Pld	W	D	L	GF	GA	GD	Pts	Qualification or relegation (Note: Teams played each other three times (33 matches), before the league was split into two groups, the top six and the bottom six.)
1	Ulsan Hyundai (C)	38	23	7	8	63	42	+21	76	Qualification for Champions League Elite league stage (Note: Since second-placed team Pohang Steelers qualified for the Champions League Elite as the Korean FA Cup champions, the spot given to the second-placed team was passed to the third-placed team.)
2	Pohang Steelers	38	16	16	6	53	40	+13	64	Qualification for Champions League Elite league stage
3	Gwangju FC	38	16	11	11	47	35	+12	59	Qualification for Champions League Elite league stage
4	Jeonbuk Hyundai Motors	38	16	9	13	45	35	+10	57	Qualification for Champions League Two group stage
5	Incheon United	38	14	14	10	46	42	+4	56	
6	Daegu FC	38	13	14	11	42	43	−1	53	
7	FC Seoul	38	14	13	11	63	49	+14	55	
8	Daejeon Hana Citizen	38	12	15	11	56	58	−2	51	
9	Jeju United	38	10	11	17	43	49	−6	41	
10	Gangwon FC (O)	38	6	16	16	30	41	−11	34	Qualification for relegation play-offs
11	Suwon FC (O)	38	8	9	21	44	76	−32	33	Qualification for relegation play-offs
12	Suwon Samsung Bluewings (R)	38	8	9	21	35	57	−22	33	Relegation to K League 2

Source: Soccerway, K League
Rules for classification: 1) Points; 2) Goals scored; 3) Goal difference; 4) Wins; 5) Head-to-head points
(C) Champions; (O) Play-off winners; (R) Relegated

== Positions by matchday ==
Leader, and qualification for Champions League Elite league stage
Qualification for Champions League Elite league stage
Qualification for Champions League 2 group stage
Qualification for relegation play-offs
Relegation to K League 2

=== Round 1–33 ===
Team ╲ Round	1	2	3	4	5	6	7	8	9	10	11	12	13	14	15	16	17	18	19	20	21	22	23	24	25	26	27	28	29	30	31	32	33
Ulsan Hyundai	3	3	1	1	1	1	1	1	1	1	1	1	1	1	1	1	1	1	1	1	1	1	1	1	1	1	1	1	1	1	1	1	1
Pohang Steelers	1	1	2	4	3	2	2	3	2	3	3	4	4	4	4	4	2	2	2	2	2	2	2	2	2	2	2	2	2	2	2	2	2
Gwangju FC	5	5	8	5	5	5	5	5	5	6	7	8	9	9	8	7	6	8	5	7	8	8	6	5	5	5	5	3	3	3	3	3	3
Jeonbuk Hyundai Motors	9	9	6	8	8	7	9	7	9	10	10	7	8	7	7	8	7	5	8	4	4	4	4	4	3	3	3	4	5	6	5	7	4
Daegu FC	8	8	9	6	6	8	10	8	8	7	8	9	6	6	6	5	8	6	7	8	5	5	5	7	6	9	8	7	6	4	6	4	5
Incheon United	9	7	5	7	7	9	8	9	10	9	9	10	10	10	10	10	9	9	9	9	9	9	9	8	8	7	6	6	7	7	7	6	6
FC Seoul	3	2	3	2	4	3	4	2	4	2	2	2	2	2	2	3	3	3	3	3	3	3	3	3	4	4	4	5	4	5	4	5	7
Daejeon Hana Citizen	2	4	4	3	2	4	3	4	3	4	4	3	5	5	5	6	5	7	6	6	6	6	7	6	7	6	7	8	8	8	8	8	8
Jeju United	6	6	10	10	12	10	7	10	7	5	5	5	3	3	3	2	4	4	4	5	7	7	8	9	9	8	9	9	9	9	9	9	9
Suwon FC	6	10	7	9	9	6	6	6	6	8	6	6	7	8	9	9	10	10	10	10	10	10	10	10	10	10	10	10	10	10	10	10	10
Gangwon FC	12	12	12	11	10	11	11	11	11	11	11	11	11	11	11	11	11	11	11	11	11	11	11	12	12	11	12	12	12	11	11	11	11
Suwon Samsung Bluewings	11	10	11	12	11	12	12	12	12	12	12	12	12	12	12	12	12	12	12	12	12	12	12	11	11	12	11	11	11	12	12	12	12

Source: K League

=== Round 34–38 ===
Team ╲ Round	34	35	36	37	38
Ulsan Hyundai	1	1	1	1	1
Pohang Steelers	2	2	2	2	2
Gwangju FC	3	3	3	3	3
Jeonbuk Hyundai Motors	4	4	4	4	4
Incheon United	5	5	5	5	5
Daegu FC	6	6	6	6	6
FC Seoul	7	7	7	7	7
Daejeon Hana Citizen	8	8	8	8	8
Jeju United	9	9	9	9	9
Gangwon FC	11	11	11	10	10
Suwon FC	10	10	10	11	11
Suwon Samsung Bluewings	12	12	12	12	12

Source: K League

== Results ==
=== Matches 1–22 ===
Teams played each other twice, once at home, once away.

Home \ Away	DGU	DHC	GWN	GJU	ICU	JJU	JHM	PHS	SEL	SSB	SWN	USH
Daegu FC	—	1–0	0–0	3–4	2–2	1–1	2–0	1–1	1–0	1–1	3–1	0–3
Daejeon Hana Citizen	0–1	—	2–0	1–1	1–3	0–3	2–2	0–0	3–2	2–2	2–1	2–1
Gangwon FC	1–1	1–2	—	1–1	0–2	0–1	1–2	0–0	3–2	0–2	1–2	0–1
Gwangju FC	0–2	0–0	0–0	—	5–0	0–1	2–0	4–2	0–2	2–1	2–0	0–1
Incheon United	0–0	3–3	1–0	1–1	—	1–0	0–0	0–1	1–1	0–1	2–2	0–1
Jeju United	1–2	1–1	2–2	0–0	2–0	—	0–2	2–1	1–2	2–1	0–0	1–3
Jeonbuk Hyundai Motors	1–0	1–2	0–1	2–0	2–0	2–0	—	1–2	2–1	1–1	3–1	2–0
Pohang Steelers	3–2	3–2	1–1	2–0	0–2	2–1	1–0	—	1–1	3–1	1–0	0–1
FC Seoul	3–0	0–0	1–0	3–1	2–1	1–1	1–1	1–1	—	3–1	7–2	1–2
Suwon Samsung Bluewings	0–1	1–3	1–1	0–1	0–0	2–3	0–3	1–1	0–1	—	1–2	2–3
Suwon FC	1–1	5–3	2–0	0–2	2–2	0–5	1–0	1–2	0–3	2–0	—	1–3
Ulsan Hyundai	3–1	3–3	1–0	2–1	1–2	5–1	2–1	2–2	3–2	2–1	3–0	—

Source: K League
Legend: Blue = home team win; Yellow = draw; Red = away team win.

Matchday 1 (25–26 February)
25 February 2023
14:00 (UTC+9)

Ulsan Hyundai	2–1	Jeonbuk Hyundai Motors
Um Won-sang 44'; Ludwigson 65'		Song Min-kyu 11'

Ulsan Munsu Stadium, Ulsan
Attendance: 28,039
25 February 2023
16:30 (UTC+9)

FC Seoul	2–1	Incheon United
Lim Sang-hyub 30'; Kim Ju-sung 70'		Oh Ban-suk 88'

Seoul World Cup Stadium, Seoul
25 February 2023
16:30 (UTC+9)

Suwon Samsung Bluewings	0–1	Gwangju FC
		Asani 88'

Suwon World Cup Stadium, Suwon
26 February 2023
14:00 (UTC+9)

Jeju United	0–0	Suwon FC

Jeju World Cup Stadium, Seogwipo, Jeju Province
26 February 2023
14:30 (Note: Kick-off time was delayed due to the problem of electric power of Pohang Steel Yard.) (UTC+9)

Pohang Steelers	3–2	Daegu FC
Jeong Jae-hee 45+1'; Lee Ho-jae 85', 90'		Go Jae-hyun 30'; Césinha 65' (pen.)

Pohang Steel Yard, Pohang
Attendance: 14,089
26 February 2023
16:30 (UTC+9)

Daejeon Hana Citizen	2–0	Gangwon FC
Tiago 10'; Leandro 23'

Daejeon World Cup Stadium, Daejeon

Matchday 2 (4–5 March)
4 March 2023
14:00 (UTC+9)

Incheon United	3–3	Daejeon Hana Citizen
Lee Myung-joo 8'; Hernandes 76'; M'Poku 81'		Tiago 20'; Kim In-gyun 67', 89'

Incheon Football Stadium, Incheon
4 March 2023
14:00 (UTC+9)

Suwon FC	1–2	Pohang Steelers
Murilo 47'		Goh Young-joon 20'; Jeong Jae-hee 33'

Suwon Sports Complex, Suwon
4 March 2023
16:30 (UTC+9)

Daegu FC	1–1	Jeju United
Barcellos 68' (pen.)		Reis 32'

DGB Daegu Bank Park, Daegu
5 March 2023
14:00 (UTC+9)

Jeonbuk Hyundai Motors	1–1	Suwon Samsung Bluewings
Cho Gue-sung 10' (pen.)		Acosty 60'

Jeonju World Cup Stadium, Jeonju
Attendance: 19,660
5 March 2023
14:00 (UTC+9)

Gangwon FC	0–1	Ulsan Hyundai
		Um Won-sang 50'

Chuncheon Songam Sports Town, Chuncheon
5 March 2023
16:30 (UTC+9)

Gwangju FC	0–2	FC Seoul
		Osmar 59'; Park Dong-jin 90+1'

Gwangju Football Stadium, Gwangju

Matchday 3 (11–12 March)
11 March 2023
14:00 (UTC+9)

Suwon FC	2–1	Suwon Samsung Bluewings
Lee Gwang-hyeok 40'; Murilo 52'		Kim Kyung-jung 68'

Suwon Sports Complex, Suwon
11 March 2023
14:00 (UTC+9)

Daejeon Hana Citizen	0–0	Pohang Steelers

Daejeon World Cup Stadium, Daejeon
11 March 2023
16:30 (UTC+9)

Gangwon FC	1–1	Daegu FC
Marcos Serrato 24' (o.g.)		Edgar 11'

Chuncheon Songam Sports Town, Chuncheon
12 March 2023
14:00 (UTC+9)

FC Seoul	1–2	Ulsan Hyundai
Na Sang-ho 53'		Joo Min-kyu 55'; Lee Chung-yong 88'

Seoul World Cup Stadium, Seoul
12 March 2023
16:30 (UTC+9)

Jeonbuk Hyundai Motors	2–0	Gwangju FC
Moon Seon-min 74', 76'

Jeonju World Cup Stadium, Jeonju
12 March 2023
16:30 (UTC+9)

Incheon United	1–0	Jeju United
Gerso Fernandes 20'

Incheon Football Stadium, Incheon

Matchday 4 (18–19 March)
18 March 2023
14:00 (UTC+9)

Pohang Steelers	1–1	Gangwon FC
Lee Ho-jae 90'		Galego 19' (pen.)

Pohang Steel Yard, Pohang
18 March 2023
14:00 (UTC+9)

Gwangju FC	5–0	Incheon United
Asani 9', 69', 72'; Eom Ji-sung 20'; Lee Hee-gyun 50'

Gwangju Football Stadium, Gwangju
18 March 2023
16:30 (UTC+9)

Jeju United	1–2	FC Seoul
Song Ju-Hun 90+2'		Kim Bong-soo 67' (o.g.); Paločević 90+5'

Jeju World Cup Stadium, Seogwipo, Jeju Province
19 March 2023
14:00 (UTC+9)

Daegu FC	2–0	Jeonbuk Hyundai Motors
Kim Jin-hyuk 11'; Césinha 90+5'

DGB Daegu Bank Park, Daegu
19 March 2023
14:00 (UTC+9)

Suwon Samsung Bluewings	1–3	Daejeon Hana Citizen
Acosty 68'		Lee Jin-hyun 62'; Byeon Jun-soo 90'; Kim Min-deok 90+3'

Suwon World Cup Stadium, Suwon
19 March 2023
16:30 (UTC+9)

Ulsan Hyundai	3–0	Suwon FC
Ludwigson 25'; Joo Min-kyu 53'; Seol Young-woo 82'

Ulsan Munsu Stadium, Ulsan

Matchday 5 (1–2 April)
1 April 2023
14:00 (UTC+9)

Jeonbuk Hyundai Motors	1–2	Pohang Steelers
Ryu Jae-moon 17'		Baek Sung-dong 58'; Zeca 90+9'

Jeonju World Cup Stadium, Jeonju
1 April 2023
16:30 (UTC+9)

Gwangju FC	2–0	Suwon FC
Lee Min-ki 5'; Park Han-bin 36'

Gwangju Football Stadium, Gwangju
1 April 2023
16:30 (UTC+9)

Incheon United	0–0	Daegu FC

Incheon Football Stadium, Incheon
1 April 2023
19:00 (UTC+9)

Daejeon Hana Citizen	3–2	FC Seoul
Osmar 14' (o.g.); Cho Yu-min 20'; Ishida 88'		Iljutcenko 24'; Na Sang-ho 50'

Daejeon World Cup Stadium, Daejeon
2 April 2023
14:00 (UTC+9)

Jeju United	1–3	Ulsan Hyundai
Yuri 45+2' (pen.)		Jung Seung-hyun 7'; Joo Min-kyu 18'; Kang Yun-gu 29'

Jeju World Cup Stadium, Seogwipo, Jeju
2 April 2023
16:30 (UTC+9)

Suwon Samsung Bluewings	1–1	Gangwon FC
Bassani 45+2'		Kim Jin-ho 73'

Suwon World Cup Stadium, Suwon

Matchday 6 (8–9 April)
8 April 2023
14:00 (UTC+9)

Ulsan Hyundai	2–1	Suwon Samsung Bluewings
Ludwigson 32', 34'		Kim Kyung-jung 79'

Ulsan Munsu Football Stadium, Ulsan
8 April 2023
16:30 (UTC+9)

FC Seoul	3–0	Daegu FC
Hwang Ui-jo 11' (pen.); Na Sang-ho 32'; Paločević 41'

Seoul World Cup Stadium, Seoul
8 April 2023
19:00 (UTC+9)

Pohang Steelers	2–0	Gwangju FC
Goh Young-joon 47'; Baek Sung-dong 58'

Pohang Steel Yard, Pohang
9 April 2023
15:00 (UTC+9)

Suwon FC	5–3	Daejeon Hana Citizen
Lee Yong 56'; Veldwijk 66', 70' (pen.); Yoon Bit-garam 81'; Murilo Henrique 88'		Lee Hyeon-sik 5'; Tiago 39', 61'

Suwon Sports Complex, Suwon
9 April 2023
16:30 (UTC+9)

Jeonbuk Hyundai Motors	2–0	Incheon United
Amano 58'; Rafael Silva 89'

Jeonju World Cup Stadium, Jeonju
9 April 2023
19:00 (UTC+9)

Gangwon FC	0–1	Jeju United
		Seo Jin-su 76'

Chuncheon Song-am Sports Town, Chuncheon

Matchday 7 (15–16 April)
15 April 2023
14:00 (UTC+9)

Suwon Samsung Bluewings	2–3	Jeju United
Bassani 8'; Yu Je-ho 80'		Yuri 22'; Reis 48', 62' (pen.)

Suwon World Cup Stadium, Suwon
15 April 2023
16:30 (UTC+9)

Pohang Steelers	1–1	FC Seoul
Kim In-sung 43'		Na Sang-ho 2'

Pohang Steel Yard, Pohang
15 April 2023
19:00 (UTC+9)

Suwon FC	1–0	Jeonbuk Hyundai Motors
Veldwijk 27'

Suwon Sports Complex, Suwon
16 April 2023
14:00 (UTC+9)

Gangwon FC	0–2	Incheon United
		Kim Jun-yeop 22'; Hernandes 85'

Chuncheon Song-am Sports Town, Chuncheon
16 April 2023
16:30 (UTC+9)

Daejeon Hana Citizen	2–1	Ulsan Hyundai
Lee Jin-hyun 9'; Lee Hyeon-sik 45+2'		Ludwigson 19'

Daejeon World Cup Stadium, Daejeon
Attendance: 16,359
16 April 2023
19:00 (UTC+9)

Daegu FC	3–4	Gwangju FC
Go Jae-hyun 64', 78'; Suzuki 81'		Kim Han-gil 19'; Sandro Lima 43'; Heo Yool 60'; Ha Seung-woon 86'

DGB Daegu Bank Park, Daegu

Matchday 8 (22–23 April)
22 April 2023
14:00 (UTC+9)

FC Seoul	3–1	Suwon Samsung Bluewings
Na Sang-ho 38'; Hwang Ui-jo 53'; Paločević 82'		Mulić 89'

Seoul World Cup Stadium, Seoul
22 April 2023
16:30 (UTC+9)

Daegu FC	1–0	Daejeon Hana Citizen
Césinha 19' (pen.)

DGB Daegu Bank Park, Daegu
22 April 2023
16:30 (UTC+9)

Ulsan Hyundai	2–2	Pohang Steelers
Joo Min-kyu 61'; Qazaishvili 90'		Go Young-joon 14', 55'

Ulsan Munsu Football Stadium, Ulsan
22 April 2023
19:00 (UTC+9)

Incheon United	2–2	Suwon FC
Cheon Seong-hoon 19', 60'		Veldwijk 57'; Yoon Bit-garam 86'

Incheon Football Stadium, Incheon
23 April 2023
14:00 (UTC+9)

Gwangju FC	0–0	Gangwon FC

Gwangju Football Stadium, Gwangju
23 April 2023
16:30 (UTC+9)

Jeju United	0–2	Jeonbuk Hyundai Motors
		Song Min-kyu 41'; Han Kyo-won 90'

Jeju World Cup Stadium, Seogwipo, Jeju

Matchday 9 (25–26 April)
25 April 2023
19:30 (UTC+9)

Incheon United	0–1	Ulsan Hyundai
		Martin Ádám 10'

Incheon Football Stadium, Incheon
25 April 2023
19:30 (UTC+9)

Pohang Steelers	1–0	Suwon Samsung Bluewings
Kim Seung-dae 4'

Pohang Steel Yard, Pohang
26 April 2023
19:00 (UTC+9)

Gwangju FC	0–1	Jeju United
		Seo Jin-su 77'

Gwangju Football Stadium, Gwangju
26 April 2023
19:00 (UTC+9)

Gangwon FC	3–2	FC Seoul
Park Sang-hyeok 25'; Jung Seung-yong 46'; Lee Woong-hee 90+1'		Lim Sang-hyub 53', 69'

Chuncheon Song-am Sports Town, Chuncheon
26 April 2023
19:30 (UTC+9)

Suwon FC	1–1	Daegu FC
Lee Gwang-hyeok 51'		Edgar 76'

Suwon Sports Complex, Suwon
26 April 2023
19:30 (UTC+9)

Jeonbuk Hyundai Motors	1–2	Daejeon Hana Citizen
Jeong Tae-wook 86'		Kryvotsyuk 51'; Lee Jin-hyun 74'

Jeonju World Cup Stadium, Jeonju

Matchday 10 (29–30 April)
29 April 2023
14:00 (UTC+9)

Suwon FC	0–3	FC Seoul
		Han Chan-hee 22'; Na Sang-ho 51' (pen.), 72'

Suwon Sports Complex, Suwon
29 April 2023
16:30 (UTC+9)

Jeonbuk Hyundai Motors	0–1	Gangwon FC
		Yang Hyun-jun 90+5'

Jeonju World Cup Stadium, Jeonju
30 April 2023
14:00 (UTC+9)

Daejeon Hana Citizen	0–3	Jeju United
		Kim Oh-gyu 21'; Chung Woon 33'; Kim Bong-soo 78'

Daejeon World Cup Stadium, Daejeon
30 April 2023
15:00 (UTC+9)

Pohang Steelers	0–2	Incheon United
		Mun Ji-hwan 56'; Cheon Seong-hoon 66'

Pohang Steel Yard, Pohang
30 April 2023
16:30 (UTC+9)

Suwon Samsung Bluewings	0–1	Daegu FC
		Edgar 54'

Suwon World Cup Stadium, Suwon
30 April 2023
19:00 (UTC+9)

Ulsan Hyundai	2–1	Gwangju FC
Qazaishvili 86'; Joo Min-kyu 90'		Lee Kang-hyun 81'

Ulsan Munsu Football Stadium, Ulsan

Matchday 11 (5–6 May)
5 May 2023
14:00 (UTC+9)

FC Seoul	1–1	Jeonbuk Hyundai Motors
Park Dong-jin 78'		Gustavo 1'

Seoul World Cup Stadium, Seoul
5 May 2023
14:00 (UTC+9)

Daegu FC	0–3	Ulsan Hyundai
		Hwang Jae-hwan 12', 41'; Qazaishvili 39'

DGB Daegu Bank Park, Daegu
5 May 2023
16:30 (UTC+9)

Incheon United	0–1	Suwon Samsung Bluewings
		Lee Ki-je 30'

Incheon Football Stadium, Incheon
6 May 2023
14:00 (UTC+9)

Jeju United	2–1	Pohang Steelers
Ha Chang-rae 49' (o.g.); Kim Bong-soo 56'		Baek Sung-dong 24'

Jeju World Cup Stadium, Seogwipo, Jeju Province
6 May 2023
16:30 (UTC+9)

Suwon FC	2–0	Gangwon FC
Veldwijk 5'; Murilo 89'

Suwon Sports Complex, Suwon
6 May 2023
19:00 (UTC+9)

Gwangju FC	0–0	Daejeon Hana Citizen

Gwangju Football Stadium(Gwangju World Cup Stadium 2), Gwangju

Matchday 12 (9–10 May)
9 May 2023
19:00 (UTC+9)

Ulsan Hyundai	1–0	Gangwon FC
Joo Min-kyu 52' (pen.)

Ulsan Munsu Football Stadium, Ulsan
9 May 2023
19:30 (UTC+9)

Daegu FC	1–1	Pohang Steelers
Suzuki 38'		Grant 21'

DGB Daegu Bank Park, Daegu
9 May 2023
19:30 (UTC+9)

FC Seoul	3–1	Gwangju FC
Willyan 10'; Na Sang-ho 66'; Park Dong-jin 87'		Heo Yool 51'

Seoul World Cup Stadium, Seoul
10 May 2023
19:30 (UTC+9)

Jeju United	2–0	Incheon United
Ahn Hyeon-beom 18'; Reis 90'

Jeju World Cup Stadium, Seogwipo, Jeju Province
10 May 2023
19:30 (UTC+9)

Suwon Samsung Bluewings	0–3	Jeonbuk Hyundai Motors
		Moon Seon-min 1'; Paik Seung-ho 41', 66'

Suwon World Cup Stadium, Suwon
10 May 2023
19:30 (UTC+9)

Daejeon Hana Citizen	2–1	Suwon FC
Ishida 16'; Jeon Byung-kwan 57'		Veldwijk 61'

Daejeon World Cup Stadium, Daejeon

Matchday 13 (13–14 May)
13 May 2023
14:00 (UTC+9)

Pohang Steelers	3–2	Daejeon Hana Citizen
Baek Sung-dong 52'; Grant 67'; Goh Young-joon 90+1'		Cho Yu-min 54'; Jeon Byung-kwan 77'

Pohang Steel Yard, Pohang
13 May 2023
16:30 (UTC+9)

Gwangju FC	0–2	Daegu FC
		Park Se-jin 64'; Go Jae-hyun 78'

Gwangju Football Stadium(Gwangju World Cup Stadium 2), Gwangju
13 May 2023
19:00 (UTC+9)

Gangwon FC	0–2	Suwon Samsung Bluewings
		Han Ho-gang 33'; An Byong-jun 58'

Chuncheon Songam Sports Town, Chuncheon
14 May 2023
14:30 (UTC+9)

Ulsan Hyundai	3–2	FC Seoul
Martin Ádám 15'; Qazaishvili 49', 68'		Kim Sin-jin 46'; Park Soo-il 90+2'

Ulsan Munsu Football Stadium, Ulsan
14 May 2023
16:30 (UTC+9)

Incheon United	0–0	Jeonbuk Hyundai Motors

Incheon Football Stadium, Incheon
14 May 2023
19:00 (UTC+9)

Suwon FC	0–5	Jeju United
		Seo Jin-su 43' (pen.), 69'; An Tae-hyun 77'; Kim Ju-gong 84'; Yuri 90'

Suwon Sports Complex, Suwon

Matchday 14 (20–21 May)
20 May 2023
16:30 (UTC+9)

Incheon United	1–1	Gwangju FC
Kweon Han-jin 80'		Ahn Young-kyu 8'

Incheon Football Stadium, Incheon
20 May 2023
18:00 (UTC+9)

FC Seoul	1–1	Jeju United
Willyan 83'		Yuri 78'

Seoul World Cup Stadium, Seoul
20 May 2023
19:00 (UTC+9)

Daejeon Hana Citizen	0–1	Daegu FC
		Go Jae-hyun 45+2'

Daejeon World Cup Stadium, Daejeon
21 May 2023
16:30 (UTC+9)

Gangwon FC	0–0	Pohang Steelers

Chuncheon Songam Sports Town, Chuncheon
21 May 2023
18:00 (UTC+9)

Suwon Samsung Bluewings	2–3	Ulsan Hyundai
An Byong-jun 8'; Lee Ki-je 61'		Ludwigson 5'; Kim Young-gwon 40'; Martin Ádám 86' (pen.)

Suwon World Cup Stadium
21 May 2023
19:00 (UTC+9)

Jeonbuk Hyundai Motors	3–1	Suwon FC
Paik Seung-ho 8'; Song Min-kyu 53'; Park Jin-seob 84'		Lee Seung-woo 14'

Jeonju World Cup Stadium, Jeonju

Matchday 15 (27–28 May)
27 May 2023
16:30 (UTC+9)

Jeju United	2–1	Suwon Samsung Bluewings
Seo Jin-su 21' (pen.); Lim Chai-min 84'		An Byong-jun 16'

Jeju World Cup Stadium, Seogwipo, Jeju Province
27 May 2023
19:00 (UTC+9)

Daegu FC	2–2	Incheon United
Edgar 51', 56'		Sin Jin-ho 31'; Hong Si-hoo 90+1'

DGB Daegu Bank Park, Daegu
28 May 2023
16:30 (UTC+9)

FC Seoul	1–0	Gangwon FC
Willyan 28'

Seoul World Cup Stadium, Seoul
28 May 2023
18:00 (UTC+9)

Suwon FC	0–2	Gwangju FC
		Letschert 76'; Asani 84'

Suwon Sports Complex, Suwon
28 May 2023
19:00 (UTC+9)

Ulsan Hyundai	3–3	Daejeon Hana Citizen
Kim Min-deok 21' (o.g.); Joo Min-kyu 77', 89'		Leandro Ribeiro 25'; Ishida 33', 43'

Ulsan Munsu Football Stadium, Ulsan
29 May 2023
16:30 (UTC+9)

Pohang Steelers	1–0	Jeonbuk Hyundai Motors
Goh Young-joon 67'

Pohang Steel Yard, Pohang

Matchday 16 (3–4 June)
3 June 2023
16:30 (UTC+9)

Jeonbuk Hyundai Motors	2–0	Ulsan Hyundai
Cho Gue-sung 84'; Moon Seon-min 90+4'

Jeonju World Cup Stadium, Jeonju
3 June 2023
18:00 (UTC+9)

Suwon Samsung Bluewings	1–2	Suwon FC
Han Ho-gang 82'		Yoon Bit-garam 44'; Oh In-pyo 67'

Suwon World Cup Stadium, Suwon
3 June 2023
19:00 (UTC+9)

Jeju United	2–2	Gangwon FC
Reis 46'; Yuri 52'		Kim Dae-won 39'; Park Sang-hyeok 80'

Jeju World Cup Stadium, Seogwipo, Jeju Province
3 June 2023
19:30 (UTC+9)

Gwangju FC	4–2	Pohang Steelers
Oberdan 26' (o.g.); Doo Hyeon-seok 56'; Eom Ji-sung 65'; Ahn Young-kyu 82'		Zeca 11'; Lee Ho-jae 75'

Gwangju Football Stadium, Gwangju
4 June 2023
16:30 (UTC+9)

Daejeon Hana Citizen	1–3	Incheon United
Tiago Orobó 59'		M'Poku 42' (pen.); Kim Bo-sub 49', 77'

Daejeon World Cup Stadium, Daejeon
4 June 2023
19:00 (UTC+9)

Daegu FC	1–0	FC Seoul
Césinha 15'

DGB Daegu Bank Park, Daegu

Matchday 17 (6–7 June)
6 June 2023
16:30 (UTC+9)

Suwon FC	1–3	Ulsan Hyundai
Yoon Bit-garam 17'		Martin Ádám 70'; Joo Min-kyu 88'; Kazaishvili 90+3'

Suwon Sports Complex, Suwon
6 June 2023
18:00 (UTC+9)

Pohang Steelers	2–1	Jeju United
Lee Ho-jae 20'; Park Seung-wook 90+2'		Reis 81' (pen.)

Pohang Steel Yard, Pohang
7 June 2023
19:00 (UTC+9)

Gwangju FC	2–1	Suwon Samsung Bluewings
Thomás Bedinelli 68', 90+1'		An Byong-jun 40'

Gwangju Football Stadium, Gwangju
7 June 2023
19:00 (UTC+9)

Jeonbuk Hyundai Motors	1–0	Daegu FC
Song Min-kyu 57'

Jeonju World Cup Stadium, Jeonju
7 June 2023
19:30 (UTC+9)

Incheon United	1–1	FC Seoul
Gerso 19'		Hwang Ui-jo 52'

Incheon Football Stadium, Incheon
7 June 2023
19:30 (UTC+9)

Gangwon FC	1–2	Daejeon Hana Citizen
Park Sang-hyeok 49'		Tiago Orobó 27'; Ju Se-jong 60'

Chuncheon Song-am Sports Town, Chuncheon

Matchday 18 (10–11 June)
10 June 2023
16:30 (UTC+9)

Daegu FC	3–1	Suwon FC
Lucas Barcellos 49'; Césinha 89'; Hwang Jae-won 90+9'		Lee Seung-woo 76'

DGB Daegu Bank Park, Daegu
10 June 2023
18:00 (UTC+9)

Ulsan Hyundai	5–1	Jeju United
Qazaishvili 31' (pen.), 90+4'; Esaka 52'; Um Won-sang 54'; Joo Min-kyu 71'		Yuri 79'

Ulsan Munsu Football Stadium, Ulsan
10 June 2023
20:00 (UTC+9)

Daejeon Hana Citizen	1–1	Gwangju FC
Kim In-kyun 90+3'		Jeong Ho-yeon 40'

Daejeon World Cup Stadium, Daejeon
11 June 2023
16:30 (UTC+9)

Gangwon FC	1–2	Jeonbuk Hyundai Motors
Jeong Tae-wook 46' (o.g.)		Cho Gue-sung 58', 77'

Chuncheon Song-am Sports Town, Chuncheon
11 June 2023
18:00 (UTC+9)

FC Seoul	1–1	Pohang Steelers
Hwang Ui-jo 37'		Ha Chang-rae 90+4'

Seoul World Cup Stadium, Seoul
Attendance: 18,108
11 June 2023
19:00 (UTC+9)

Suwon Samsung Bluewings	0–0	Incheon United

Suwon World Cup Stadium, Suwon

Matchday 19 (24–25 June)
24 June 2023
16:30 (UTC+9)

Suwon Samsung Bluewings	0–1	FC Seoul
		Willyan 87'

Suwon World Cup Stadium, Suwon
24 June 2023
18:00 (UTC+9)

Jeju United	1–1	Daejeon Hana Citizen
Kim Seung-sub 76'		Tiago Orobó 86'

Jeju World Cup Stadium, Seogwipo, Jeju Province
24 June 2023
19:00 (UTC+9)

Gwangju FC	2–0	Jeonbuk Hyundai Motors
Lee Soon-min 19'; Lee Kun-hee 90+1'

Gwangju Football Stadium, Gwangju
24 June 2023
19:30 (UTC+9)

Ulsan Hyundai	3–1	Daegu FC
Kim Tae-hwan 3'; Qazaishvili 66', 90+4'		Barcellos 87'

Ulsan Munsu Football Stadium, Ulsan
25 June 2023
16:30 (UTC+9)

Incheon United	0–1	Pohang Steelers
		Zeca 12'

Incheon Football Stadium, Incheon
25 June 2023
19:00 (UTC+9)

Suwon FC	1–1	Gangwon FC
Veldwijk 66'		Lee Jeong-hyeop 26'

Suwon Sports Complex, Suwon

Matchday 20 (1–2 July)
1 July 2023
18:00 (UTC+9)

Jeonbuk Hyundai Motors	2–0	Jeju United
Lim Chai-min 10' (o.g.); Moon Seon-min 84'

Jeonju World Cup Stadium, Jeonju
1 July 2023
19:00 (UTC+9)

Daegu FC	1–1	Suwon Samsung Bluewings
Césinha 90'		Jo Jin-woo 54' (o.g.)

DGB Daegu Bank Park, Daegu
1 July 2023
19:30 (UTC+9)

FC Seoul	0–0	Daejeon Hana Citizen

Seoul World Cup Stadium, Seoul
2 July 2023
18:00 (UTC+9)

Gwangju FC	0–1	Ulsan Hyundai
		Park Yong-woo 60'

Gwangju Football Stadium, Gwangju
2 July 2023
19:00 (UTC+9)

Pohang Steelers	3–1	Suwon FC
Grant 42'; Zeca 59'; Han Chan-hee 90+2'		Veldwijk 88'

Pohang Steel Yard, Pohang
2 July 2023
20:00 (UTC+9)

Incheon United	1–0	Gangwon FC
Kim Min-seok 5'

Incheon Football Stadium, Incheon

Matchday 21 (7–9 July)
7 July 2023
19:30 (UTC+9)

Gangwon FC	1–1	Gwangju FC
Han Kook-young 90+8'		Letschert 90+2'

Gangneung Stadium, Gangneung
7 July 2023
19:30 (UTC+9)

Jeju United	1–2	Daegu FC
Yeon Je-woon 5'		Hong Chul 14'; Jang Seong-won 90'

Jeju World Cup Stadium, Seogwipo, Jeju Province
8 July 2023
18:00 (UTC+9)

Pohang Steelers	0–1	Ulsan Hyundai
		Joo Min-kyu 23'

Pohang Steel Yard, Pohang
8 July 2023
19:00 (UTC+9)

Suwon FC	2–2	Incheon United
Yoon Bit-garam 9', 33'		Cheon Seong-hoon 42'; Hugo Gomes 48' (o.g.)

Suwon Sports Complex, Suwon
8 July 2023
19:30 (UTC+9)

Jeonbuk Hyundai Motors	2–1	FC Seoul
Cho Gue-sung 67'; Rafael Silva 76'		Na Sang-ho 90+8' (pen.)

Jeonju World Cup Stadium, Jeonju
9 July 2023
19:00 (UTC+9)

Daejeon Hana Citizen	2–2	Suwon Samsung Bluewings
Kim In-kyun 17'; Shin Sang-eun 28'		Ko Seung-beom 31'; Mulić 57'

Daejeon World Cup Stadium, Daejeon

Matchday 22 (11–12 July)
11 July 2023
19:00 (UTC+9)

Daegu FC	0–0	Gangwon FC

DGB Daegu Bank Park, Daegu
11 July 2023
19:30 (UTC+9)

Jeju United	0–0	Gwangju FC

Jeju World Cup Stadium, Seogwipo, Jeju Province
12 July 2023
19:00 (UTC+9)

Ulsan Hyundai	1–2	Incheon United
Martin Ádám 90'		Kim Bo-sub 55'; Hernandes 90+5'

Ulsan Munsu Stadium, Ulsan
12 July 2023
19:30 (UTC+9)

FC Seoul	7–2	Suwon FC
Na Sang-ho 8', 48'; Kim Sin-jin 14', 56'; Kim Ju-sung 45+4'; Willyan 64'; Kim Gyeong-min 68'		Yoon Bit-garam 50'; Lee Seung-woo 53'

Seoul World Cup Stadium, Seoul
12 July 2023
19:30 (UTC+9)

Suwon Samsung Bluewings	1–1	Pohang Steelers
Mulić 62'		Zeca 79' (pen.)

Suwon World Cup Stadium, Suwon
12 July 2023
19:30 (UTC+9)

Daejeon Hana Citizen	2–2	Jeonbuk Hyundai Motors
Kim In-kyun 76'; Shin Sang-eun 90+2'		Song Min-kyu 19'; Rafael Silva 90+4'

Daejeon World Cup Stadium, Daejeon

=== Matches 23–33 ===
Teams played each other once, either at home or away.

Home \ Away	DGU	DHC	GWN	GJU	ICU	JJU	JHM	PHS	SEL	SSB	SWN	USH
Daegu FC	—	—	1–0	—	—	1–0	—	0–0	—	—	2–2	0–0
Daejeon Hana Citizen	1–0	—	—	—	—	1–0	—	—	4–3	3–1	0–1	—
Gangwon FC	—	1–1	—	—	1–1	—	—	1–1	1–1	1–2	—	2–0
Gwangju FC	1–1	3–0	1–0	—	—	—	0–1	—	—	4–0	—	—
Incheon United	3–1	2–0	—	2–2	—	2–1	—	0–2	—	2–0	—	—
Jeju United	—	—	1–1	1–2	—	—	0–0	—	1–3	—	3–0	—
Jeonbuk Hyundai Motors	1–3	1–1	1–3	—	2–0	—	—	—	—	1–1	1–0	—
Pohang Steelers	—	4–3	—	1–1	—	4–2	2–1	—	—	—	2–0	0–0
FC Seoul	2–2	—	—	0–1	0–1	—	0–2	2–2	—	—	—	2–2
Suwon Samsung Bluewings	0–1	—	—	—	—	1–0	—	1–0	0–1	—	0–2	3–1
Suwon FC	—	—	1–1	0–1	1–2	—	—	—	1–1	—	—	2–3
Ulsan Hyundai	—	1–1	—	0–2	0–0	2–1	1–0	—	—	—	—	—

Source: K League
Legend: Blue = home team win; Yellow = draw; Red = away team win.

Matchday 23 (15–16 July)
15 July 2023
19:00 (UTC+9)

Suwon Samsung Bluewings	3–1	Ulsan Hyundai
Jeon Jin-woo 40'; Fejsal Mulić 74'; Kim Ju-chan 90+1'		Qazaishvili 90+5'

Suwon World Cup Stadium, Suwon
15 July 2023
19:30 (UTC+9)

Gangwon FC	1–1	FC Seoul
Yu In-soo 31'		Osmar Ibáñez 68'

Gangneung Stadium, Gangneung
15 July 2023
20:00 (UTC+9)

Gwangju FC	1–1	Daegu FC
Ju Young-jae 16'		Lee Keun-ho 23'

Gwangju Football Stadium, Gwangju
16 July 2023
19:00 (UTC+9)

Jeonbuk Hyundai Motors	1–0	Suwon FC
Gustavo 13'

Jeonju World Cup Stadium, Jeonju
16 July 2023
19:30 (UTC+9)

Pohang Steelers	4–2	Jeju United
Go Young-joon 16'; Grant 73'; Wanderson 74'; Kim Seung-dae 90+8'		Kim Ju-gong 55'; Yeon Je-woon 71'

Pohang Steel Yard, Pohang
16 July 2023
20:00 (UTC+9)

Incheon United	2–0	Daejeon Hana Citizen
Gerso 84'; Hernandes 90+2'

Incheon Football Stadium, Incheon

Matchday 24 (21–22 July)
21 July 2023
19:00 (UTC+9)

Pohang Steelers	2–1	Jeonbuk Hyundai Motors
Han Chan-hee 35'; Lee Ho-jae 89'		Moon Seon-min 47'

Pohang Steel Yard, Pohang
21 July 2023
19:00 (UTC+9)

Ulsan Hyundai	2–1	Jeju United
Kim Min-hyeok 30'; Lee Dong-gyeong 35'		Kim Ju-gong 55'

Ulsan Munsu Stadium, Ulsan
22 July 2023
19:00 (UTC+9)

Suwon FC	0–1	Gwangju FC
		44' Doo Hyeon-seok

Suwon Sports Complex, Suwon
22 July 2023
19:00 (UTC+9)

Gangwon FC	1–2	Suwon Samsung Bluewings
Seo Min-woo 41'		Kim Ju-chan 23'; Ko Seung-beom 61'

Gangneung Stadium, Gangneung
22 July 2023
19:00 (UTC+9)

FC Seoul	0–1	Incheon United
		M'Poku 45'

Seoul World Cup Stadium, Seoul
22 July 2023
19:00 (UTC+9)

Daejeon Hana Citizen	1–0	Daegu FC
Bae Jun-ho 62'

Daejeon World Cup Stadium, Daejeon

Matchday 25 (4–6 August)
4 August 2023
19:30 (UTC+9)

FC Seoul	2–2	Pohang Steelers
Kim Sin-jin 54'; Paločević 68'		Oberdan 64'; Ha Chang-rae 90+4'

Seoul World Cup Stadium, Seoul
4 August 2023
19:30 (UTC+9)

Gwangju FC	3–0	Daejeon Hana Citizen
Kim Han-gil 8'; Jeong Ho-yeon 13'; Lee Kun-hee 63'

Gwangju Football Stadium, Gwangju
5 August 2023
19:00 (UTC+9)

Suwon Samsung Bluewings	0–2	Suwon FC
		Veldwijk 26'; Lee Seung-woo 45+3'

Suwon World Cup Stadium, Suwon
5 August 2023
19:30 (UTC+9)

Daegu FC	0–0	Ulsan Hyundai

DGB Daegu Bank Park, Daegu
6 August 2023
19:00 (UTC+9)

Jeonbuk Hyundai Motors	2–0	Incheon United
Park Jae-yong 15'; Han Kyo-won 45'

Jeonju World Cup Stadium, Jeonju
6 August 2023
19:30 (UTC+9)

Jeju United	1–1	Gangwon FC
Reis 90+5' (pen.)		Park Sang-hyeok 82'

Jeju World Cup Stadium, Seogwipo, Jeju Province

Matchday 26 (12–13 August)
12 August 2023
19:00 (UTC+9)

Jeonbuk Hyundai Motors	1–1	Suwon Samsung Bluewings
Han Kyo-won 66'		Han Ho-gang 31'

Jeonju World Cup Stadium, Jeonju
12 August 2023
19:30 (UTC+9)

Gangwon FC	2–0	Ulsan Hyundai
Seo Min-woo 38'; Yago Cariello 90+7'

Gangneung Stadium, Gangneung
12 August 2023
20:00 (UTC+9)

Jeju United	3–0	Suwon FC
Yuri 35', 45+3'; Reis 63'

Jeju World Cup Stadium, Seogwipo, Jeju Province
13 August 2023
19:00 (UTC+9)

Daejeon Hana Citizen	4–3	FC Seoul
Tiago Orobó 32', 42' (pen.); Bae Jun-ho 86'; Kang Yoon-sung 90'		Willyan 45'; Han Seung-gyu 89'; Iljutcenko 90+3'

Daejeon World Cup Stadium, Daejeon
13 August 2023
19:30 (UTC+9)

Incheon United	3–1	Daegu FC
Mugoša 23'; Mun Ji-hwan 32'; Gerso Fernandes 45+1'		Césinha 84' (pen.)

Incheon Football Stadium, Incheon
13 August 2023
20:00 (UTC+9)

Pohang Steelers	1–1	Gwangju FC
Goh Young-jun 20'		Letschert 67'

Pohang Steel Yard, Pohang

Matchday 27 (18–20 August)
18 August 2023
19:30 (UTC+9)

Suwon Samsung Bluewings	1–0	Jeju United
Bulthuis 85'

Suwon World Cup Stadium, Suwon
Attendance: 7,258
18 August 2023
19:30 (UTC+9)

Incheon United	2–2	Gwangju FC
Gerso 49', 59'		Asani 78'; Lee Kun-hee 90+2'

Incheon Football Stadium, Incheon
Attendance: 5,870
19 August 2023
19:00 (UTC+9)

Gangwon FC	1–2	Suwon FC
Tući 21'		Lee Seung-woo 49'; Yoon Bit-garam 90+5'

Gangneung Stadium, Gangneung
19 August 2023
19:00 (UTC+9)

Ulsan Hyundai	1–0	Jeonbuk Hyundai Motors
Um Won-sang 72'

Ulsan Munsu Football Stadium, Ulsan
Attendance: 30,008
19 August 2023
19:30 (UTC+9)

FC Seoul	2–2	Daegu FC
Oh Seung-hoon 9' (o.g.); Kim Sin-jin 42'		Lee Keun-ho 25'; Edgar 82'

Seoul World Cup Stadium, Seoul
20 August 2023
19:00 (UTC+9)

Pohang Steelers	4–3	Daejeon Hana Citizen
Zeca 41', 51'; Kim Seung-dae 76'; Hong Yun-sang 90+8'		Tiago Orobó 80', 83', 90+6'

Pohang Steel Yard, Pohang

Matchday 28 (25–27 August)
25 August 2023
19:00 (UTC+9)

Suwon FC	1–2	Incheon United
Lee Seung-woo 46'		Cheon Seong-hoon 45+4'; Oh Ban-suk 90+7'

Suwon Sports Complex, Suwon
25 August 2023
19:30 (UTC+9)

Jeonbuk Hyundai Motors	1–1	Daejeon Hana Citizen
Song Min-kyu 38'		Tiago Orobó 33'

Jeonju World Cup Stadium, Jeonju
26 August 2023
19:00 (UTC+9)

Daegu FC	1–0	Jeju United
Go Jae-hyun 62'

DGB Daegu Bank Park, Daegu
Attendance: 12,136
26 August 2023
19:30 (UTC+9)

Gangwon FC	1–1	Pohang Steelers
Alibaev 34'		Hong Yun-sang 17'

Gangneung Stadium, Gangneung
27 August 2023
19:00 (UTC+9)

FC Seoul	2–2	Ulsan Hyundai
Iljutcenko 10'; Willyan 90+7'		Joo Min-kyu 65', 69'

Seoul World Cup Stadium, Seoul
27 August 2023
19:30 (UTC+9)

Gwangju FC	4–0	Suwon Samsung Bluewings
Lee Hee-gyun 19'; Asani 38'; Eom Ji-sung 47', 52'

Gwangju Football Stadium, Gwangju

Matchday 29 (1–3 September)
1 September 2023
19:00 (UTC+9)

Daejeon Hana Citizen	0–1	Suwon FC
		Lee Seung-woo 32'

Daejeon World Cup Stadium, Daejeon
1 September 2023
19:30 (UTC+9)

Daegu FC	1–0	Gangwon FC
Césinha 14'

DGB Daegu Bank Park, Daegu
2 September 2023
16:30 (UTC+9)

Suwon Samsung Bluewings	0–1	FC Seoul
		Iljutcenko 1'

Suwon World Cup Stadium, Suwon
Attendance: 22,882
2 September 2023
19:00 (UTC+9)

Incheon United	0–2	Pohang Steelers
		Zeca 64' (pen.); Wanderson 87' (pen.)

Incheon Football Stadium, Incheon
3 September 2023
16:30 (UTC+9)

Ulsan Hyundai	0–2	Gwangju FC
		Lee Kun-hee 17'; Mikeltadze 54'

Ulsan Munsu Football Stadium, Ulsan
Attendance: 18,358
3 September 2023
19:00 (UTC+9)

Jeju United	0–0	Jeonbuk Hyundai Motors

Jeju World Cup Stadium, Seogwipo, Jeju Province

Matchday 30 (16–17 September)
16 September 2023
14:00 (UTC+9)

Jeonbuk Hyundai Motors	1–3	Gangwon FC
Gustavo 6' (pen.)		Vitor Gabriel 45+1'; Galego 45+3'; Kim Dae-won 76'

Jeonju World Cup Stadium, Jeonju
16 September 2023
14:00 (UTC+9)

Incheon United	2–1	Jeju United
Lee Myung-joo 30'; Hernandes 90+4'		Kim Seung-sub 68'

Incheon Football Stadium, Incheon
16 September 2023
16:30 (UTC+9)

Pohang Steelers	2–0	Suwon FC
Zeca 29', 45'

Pohang Steel Yard, Pohang
16 September 2023
19:00 (UTC+9)

Ulsan Hyundai	1–1	Daejeon Hana Citizen
Joo Min-kyu 30' (pen.)		Kim In-kyun 1'

Ulsan Munsu Football Stadium, Ulsan
17 September 2023
14:00 (UTC+9)

FC Seoul	0–1	Gwangju FC
		Heo Yool 4'

Seoul World Cup Stadium, Seoul
17 September 2023
16:30 (UTC+9)

Suwon Samsung Bluewings	0–1	Daegu FC
		Barcellos 90+'

Suwon World Cup Stadium, Suwon

Matchday 31 (23–24 September)
23 September 2023
14:00 (UTC+9)

Daejeon Hana Citizen	3–1	Suwon Samsung Bluewings
Kim In-kyun 15'; Yu Kang-hyun 37'; Tiago Orobó 90+10'		Kozuka 58'

Daejeon World Cup Stadium, Daejeon
23 September 2023
16:30 (UTC+9)

Jeju United	1–3	FC Seoul
Reis 73'		Lee Seung-mo 40', 50'; Iljutcenko 66'

Jeju World Cup Stadium, Seogwipo, Jeju Province
24 September 2023
14:00 (UTC+9)

Suwon FC	2–3	Ulsan Hyundai
Oh In-pyo 68'; Walterson 78'		Lee Dong-gyeong 24'; Esaka 55'; Joo Min-kyu 81'

Suwon Sports Complex, Suwon
24 September 2023
14:00 (UTC+9)

Gwangju FC	0–1	Jeonbuk Hyundai Motors
		Ahn Hyeon-beom 73'

Gwangju Football Stadium, Gwangju
24 September 2023
16:30 (UTC+9)

Gangwon FC	1–1	Incheon United
Lee Ji-sol 6'		Mugoša 12'

Gangneung Stadium, Gangneung
24 September 2023
19:00 (UTC+9)

Daegu FC	0–0	Pohang Steelers

DGB Daegu Bank Park, Daegu

Matchday 32 (30 September – 1 October)
30 September 2023
14:00 (UTC+9)

Suwon FC	1–1	FC Seoul
Ricardo Lopes 74' (pen.)		Ki Sung-yueng 81'

Suwon Sports Complex, Suwon
30 September 2023
14:00 (UTC+9)

Pohang Steelers	0–0	Ulsan Hyundai

Pohang Steel Yard, Pohang
30 September 2023
16:30 (UTC+9)

Jeonbuk Hyundai Motors	1–3	Daegu FC
Boateng 25'		Go Jae-hyun 1', 58'; Barcelos 16'

Jeonju World Cup Stadium, Jeonju
30 September 2023
19:00 (UTC+9)

Incheon United	2–0	Suwon Samsung Bluewings
Mugoša 20' (pen.); Cheon Seong-hoon 82'

Incheon Football Stadium, Incheon
1 October 2023
14:00 (UTC+9)

Gangwon FC	1–1	Daejeon Hana Citizen
Kim Dae-won 21'		Ishida 19'

Gangneung Stadium, Gangneung
1 October 2023
16:30 (UTC+9)

Jeju United	1–2	Gwangju FC
Yuri 81'		Eom Ji-sung 65'; Ha Seung-un 90+4'

Jeju World Cup Stadium, Seogwipo, Jeju Province

Matchday 33 (8 October)
8 October 2023
15:00 (UTC+9)

Daegu FC	2–2	Suwon FC
Go Jae-hyun 31'; Victor Bobsin 70'		Lee Seung-woo 45+1', 67'

DGB Daegu Bank Park, Daegu
8 October 2023
15:00 (UTC+9)

Daejeon Hana Citizen	1–0	Jeju United
Kim Min-deok 41'

Daejeon World Cup Stadium, Daejeon
8 October 2023
15:00 (UTC+9)

Gwangju FC	1–0	Gangwon FC
Kim Han-gil 50'

Gwangju Football Stadium, Gwangju
8 October 2023
15:00 (UTC+9)

FC Seoul	0–2	Jeonbuk Hyundai Motors
		Han Kyo-won 60'; Gustavo 75'

Seoul World Cup Stadium, Seoul
8 October 2023
15:00 (UTC+9)

Suwon Samsung Bluewings	1–0	Pohang Steelers
Kim Ju-chan 23'

Suwon World Cup Stadium, Suwon
8 October 2023
15:00 (UTC+9)

Ulsan Hyundai	0–0	Incheon United

Ulsan Munsu Football Stadium, Ulsan

=== Matches 34–38 ===
Teams played each other once, either at home or away.

==== Final A ====
Home \ Away	DGU	GJU	ICU	JHM	PHS	USH
Daegu FC	—	1–1	2–1	1–2	—	—
Gwangju FC	—	—	0–2	—	0–0	1–0
Incheon United	—	—	—	1–1	—	3–1
Jeonbuk Hyundai Motors	—	2–0	—	—	1–1	—
Pohang Steelers	1–0	—	1–1	—	—	—
Ulsan Hyundai	2–0	—	—	1–0	3–2	—

Source: K League
Legend: Blue = home team win; Yellow = draw; Red = away team win.

Matchday 34 (20–21 October)
20 October 2023
19:30 UTC+9

Pohang Steelers	1–1	Incheon United
Zeca 78' (pen.)		Gerso 27'

Pohang Steel Yard, Pohang
21 October 2023
14:00 UTC+9

Gwangju FC	1–0	Ulsan Hyundai
Lee Kun-hee 88'

Gwangju Football Stadium, Gwangju
21 October 2023
16:30 UTC+9

Daegu FC	1–2	Jeonbuk Hyundai Motors
Edgar 34'		Han Kyo-won 30'; Gustavo 90' (pen.)

DGB Daegu Bank Park, Daegu

Matchday 35 (28–29 October)
28 October 2023
14:00 UTC+9

Jeonbuk Hyundai Motors	1–1	Pohang Steelers
Gustavo 54' (pen.)		Zeca 70' (pen.)

Jeonju World Cup Stadium, Jeonju
28 October 2023
16:30 UTC+9

Gwangju FC	0–2	Incheon United
		Choi Woo-jin 76'; Kim Min-seok 84'

Gwangju Football Stadium, Gwangju
29 October 2023
14:00 UTC+9

Ulsan Hyundai	2–0	Daegu FC
Kim Min-hyeok 68'; Jang Si-young 90'

Ulsan Munsu Football Stadium, Ulsan

Matchday 36 (11–12 November)
11 November 2023
16:30 UTC+9

Daegu FC	1–1	Gwangju FC
Kim Gang-san 40'		Mikeltadze 19'

DGB Daegu Bank Park, Daegu
Attendance: 12,222
12 November 2023
14:00 UTC+9

Incheon United	1–1	Jeonbuk Hyundai Motors
Kim Do-hyuk 60'		Park Jae-yong 68'

Incheon Football Stadium, Incheon
12 November 2023
16:30 UTC+9

Ulsan Hyundai	3–2	Pohang Steelers
Seol Young-woo 46'; Esaka 50'; Joo Min-kyu 62'		Kang Hyeon-je 32'; Lee Ho-jae 82' (pen.)

Ulsan Munsu Football Stadium, Ulsan

Matchday 37 (24–25 November)
24 November 2023
19:30 UTC+9

Incheon United	3–1	Ulsan Hyundai
Park Seung-ho 51'; Hong Si-hoo 74'; Oh Ban-suk 76'		Joo Min-kyu 89' (pen.)

Incheon Football Stadium, Incheon
25 November 2023
14:00 UTC+9

Jeonbuk Hyundai Motors	2–0	Gwangju FC
Ahn Hyeon-beom 17'; Song Min-kyu 45+1'

Jeonju World Cup Stadium, Jeonju
25 November 2023
16:30 UTC+9

Pohang Steelers	1–0	Daegu FC
Lee Ho-jae 89' (pen.)

Pohang Steel Yard, Pohang

Matchday 38 (3 December)
3 December 2023
15:00 UTC+9

Ulsan Hyundai	1–0	Jeonbuk Hyundai Motors
Seol Young-woo 32'

Ulsan Munsu Football Stadium, Ulsan
3 December 2023
15:00 UTC+9

Gwangju FC	0–0	Pohang Steelers

Gwangju Football Stadium, Gwangju
3 December 2023
15:00 UTC+9

Daegu FC	2–1	Incheon United
Edgar 41', 57'		Hernandes Rodrigues 75'

DGB Daegu Bank Park, Daegu

==== Final B ====
Home \ Away	DHC	GWN	JJU	SEL	SSB	SWN
Daejeon Hana Citizen	—	0–1	—	2–2	—	1–1
Gangwon FC	—	—	1–1	—	—	2–0
Jeju United	0–2	—	—	0–0	2–0	—
FC Seoul	—	2–1	—	—	0–1	—
Suwon Samsung Bluewings	2–2	0–0	—	—	—	—
Suwon FC	—	—	1–1	3–4	2–3	—

Source: K League
Legend: Blue = home team win; Yellow = draw; Red = away team win.

Matchday 34 (22 October)
22 October 2023
14:00 UTC+9

FC Seoul	2–1	Gangwon FC
Na Sang-ho 53'; Ji Dong-won 80'		Vitor Gabriel 76'

Seoul World Cup Stadium, Seoul
22 October 2023
16:30 UTC+9

Jeju United	2–0	Suwon Samsung Bluewings
Kim Geon-ung 4'; Yuri 25'

Jeju World Cup Stadium, Seogwipo, Jeju Province
22 October 2023
16:40 UTC+9

Daejeon Hana Citizen	1–1	Suwon FC
Tiago Orobó 62'		Kim Hyun 33'

Daejeon World Cup Stadium, Daejeon

Matchday 35 (28–29 October)
28 October 2023
16:30 UTC+9

Gangwon FC	1–1	Jeju United
Vitor Gabriel 51'		Chung Woon 90+6'

Gangneung Stadium, Gangneung
29 October 2023
14:00 UTC+9

Suwon Samsung Bluewings	2–2	Daejeon Hana Citizen
Kim Ju-chan 21'; Acosty 30'		Tiago Orobó 81'; Ishida 90+4'

Suwon World Cup Stadium, Suwon
29 October 2023
16:30 UTC+9

Suwon FC	3–4	FC Seoul
Ricardo Lopes 30', 90+2' (pen.); Lee Seung-woo 67'		Na Sang-ho 57'; Willyan 59'; Johnsen 73'; Kim Gyeong-min 90+3'

Suwon Sports Complex, Suwon

Matchday 36 (11–12 November)
11 November 2023
14:00 UTC+9

Daejeon Hana Citizen	0–1	Gangwon FC
		Kim Dae-won 69'

Daejeon World Cup Stadium, Daejeon
11 November 2023
16:30 UTC+9

Jeju United	0–0	FC Seoul

Jeju World Cup Stadium, Seogwipo, Jeju Province
12 November 2023
14:00 UTC+9

Suwon FC	2–3	Suwon Samsung Bluewings
Hugo Gomes 31'; KIM Hyun 61'		Acosty 45+4'; An Byong-jun 54'; Kim Ju-chan 79'

Suwon Sports Complex, Suwon

Matchday 37 (25 November)
25 November 2023
14:00 UTC+9

Jeju United	0–2	Daejeon Hana Citizen
		Shin Sang-eun 84'; Kim In-kyun 90+1'

Jeju World Cup Stadium, Seogwipo, Jeju Province
25 November 2023
16:30 UTC+9

FC Seoul	0–1	Suwon Samsung Bluewings
		Bassani 63'

Seoul World Cup Stadium, Seoul
25 November 2023
16:30 UTC+9

Gangwon FC	2–0	Suwon FC
Lee Jeong-hyeop 19'; Kim Jin-ho 82'

Gangneung Stadium, Gangneung

Matchday 38 (2 December)
2 December 2023
15:00 UTC+9

Daejeon Hana Citizen	2–2	FC Seoul
Tiago Orobó 22'; Shin Sang-eun 90+7'		Kang Seong-jin 6', 62'

Daejeon World Cup Stadium, Daejeon
2 December 2023
15:00 UTC+9

Suwon FC	1–1	Jeju United
Lee Yeong-jae 50'		Kim Geon-ung 6'

Suwon Sports Complex, Suwon
2 December 2023
15:00 UTC+9

Suwon Samsung Bluewings	0–0	Gangwon FC

Suwon World Cup Stadium, Suwon

== Relegation play-offs ==
The tenth-placed team and the eleventh-placed team played against the play-offs winners and the runners-up of the K League 2, respectively, in the relegation play-offs.

Team 1	Agg.	Team 2	1st leg	2nd leg
Gimpo FC	1–2	Gangwon FC	0–0	1–2
Busan IPark	4–6	Suwon FC	2–1	2–5 (a.e.t.)

6 December 2023
19:00 UTC+9

Gimpo FC	0–0	Gangwon FC
	Report

Gimpo Solteo Football Field, Gimpo
Attendance: 3,736
Referee: Jeong Dong-sik
9 December 2023
14:00 UTC+9

Gangwon FC	2–1	Gimpo FC
Vitor Gabriel 51', 76'	Report	Cho Sung-gwon 59'

Gangneung Stadium, Gangneung
Attendance: 10,130
Referee: Lee Dong-jun

Gangwon FC won 2–1 on aggregate and therefore both clubs remain in their respective leagues.

6 December 2023
19:00 UTC+9

Busan IPark	2–1	Suwon FC
Bruno Lamas 85' (pen.), 90+9' (pen.)	Report	Jang Jae-woong 43'

Busan Asiad Main Stadium, Busan
Attendance: 4,047
Referee: Ko Hyung-jin
9 December 2023
14:00 UTC+9

Suwon FC	5–2 (a.e.t.)	Busan IPark
Kim Hyun 79'; Lee Yeong-jae 86'; Lee Gwang-hyeok 96'; Jung Jae-yong 101'; Ricardo Lopes 118'	Report	Choi Jun 16'; Kim Jeong-hwan 115'

Suwon Sports Complex, Suwon
Attendance: 6,987
Referee: Kim Jong-hyeok

Suwon FC won 6–4 on aggregate and therefore both clubs remain in their respective leagues.

== Statistics ==
=== Top goalscorers ===
Joo Min-kyu, who appeared in less time than Tiago Orobó, won the top goalscorer award.

Rank	Player	Team	Goals
1	(South Korea) Joo Min-kyu	Ulsan Hyundai	17
1	(Brazil) Tiago Orobó	Daejeon Hana Citizen	17
3	(Brazil) Zeca	Pohang Steelers	12
3	(South Korea) Na Sang-ho	FC Seoul	12
5	(Georgia (country)) Valeri Qazaishvili	Ulsan Hyundai	11
6	(Brazil) Yuri	Jeju United	10
6	(South Korea) Lee Seung-woo	Suwon FC	10
8	(South Africa) Lars Veldwijk	Suwon FC	9
8	(Brazil) Edgar	Daegu FC	9
8	(South Korea) Go Jae-hyun	Daegu FC	9

=== Top assist providers ===
Rank	Player	Team	Assists
1	(South Korea) Baek Sung-dong	Pohang Steelers	8
2	(Brazil) Leandro Ribeiro	Daejeon Hana Citizen	7
2	(South Korea) Kim Seung-dae	Pohang Steelers	7
2	(Brazil) Tiago Orobó	Daejeon Hana Citizen	7
2	(Brazil) Zeca	Pohang Steelers	7
2	(South Korea) Doo Hyeon-seok	Gwangju FC	7
7	(South Korea) Kim In-kyun	Daejeon Hana Citizen	6
7	(South Korea) Hong Chul	Daegu FC	6
7	(Guinea-Bissau) Gerso Fernandes	Incheon United	6
10	7 Players		5

=== Hat-tricks ===
Player	For	Against	Result	Date
(Albania) Jasir Asani	Gwangju FC	Incheon United	5–0	23 March 2023
(Brazil) Tiago Orobó	Daejeon Hana Citizen	Pohang Steelers	3–4	20 August 2023

== Awards ==
=== Weekly awards ===
Round	Player of the Round	
Round	Player	Club
1	(South Korea) Lee Ho-jae	Pohang Steelers
2	(South Korea) Goh Young-joon	Pohang Steelers
3	(South Korea) Moon Seon-min	Jeonbuk Hyundai Motors
4	(Albania) Jasir Asani	Gwangju FC
5	(South Korea) Baek Sung-dong	Pohang Steelers
6	(South Africa) Lars Veldwijk	Suwon FC
7	(South Korea) Lee Jin-hyun	Daejeon Hana Citizen
8	(South Korea) Cheon Seong-hoon	Incheon United
9	(Azerbaijan) Anton Kryvotsyuk	Daejeon Hana Citizen
10	(South Korea) Na Sang-ho	FC Seoul
11	(South Korea) Hwang Jae-hwan	Ulsan Hyundai
12	(South Korea) Paik Seung-ho	Jeonbuk Hyundai Motors
13	(Georgia (country)) Valeri Qazaishvili	Ulsan Hyundai
14	(South Korea) Song Min-kyu	Jeonbuk Hyundai Motors
15	(South Korea) Goh Young-joon	Pohang Steelers
16	(South Korea) Kim Bo-sub	Incheon United
17	(Brazil) Thomás Bedinelli	Gwangju FC
18	(Brazil) Cesinha	Daegu FC
19	(Georgia (country)) Valeri Qazaishvili	Ulsan Hyundai

Round	Player of the Round	
Round	Player	Club
20	(Brazil) Oberdan	Pohang Steelers
21	(South Korea) Oh Seung-hoon	Daegu FC
22	(South Korea) Na Sang-ho	FC Seoul
23	(Guinea-Bissau) Gerso Fernandes	Incheon United
24	(South Korea) Ko Seung-beom	Suwon Samsung Bluewings
25	(South Korea) Lee Seung-woo	Suwon FC
26	(Brazil) Yuri	Jeju United
27	(Brazil) Zeca	Pohang Steelers
28	(South Korea) Eom Ji-sung	Gwangju FC
29	(Brazil) Hugo Gomes	Suwon FC
30	(Brazil) Zeca	Pohang Steelers
31	(South Korea) Lee Seung-mo	FC Seoul
32	(South Korea) Go Jae-hyun	Daegu FC
33	(South Korea) Kim Ju-chan	Suwon Samsung Bluewings
34	(South Korea) Kim Geon-ung	Jeju United
35	(Brazil) Willyan	FC Seoul
36	(South Korea) Kim Dae-won	Gangwon FC
37	(South Korea) Park Seung-ho	Incheon United
38	(Brazil) Edgar	Daegu FC

=== Monthly awards ===
Month	Player of the Month		Young Player of the Month		Goal of the Month	
Month	Player	Club	Player	Club	Player	Club
February/March	(South Korea) Joo Min-kyu	Ulsan	(South Korea) Jeong Ho-yeon	Gwangju	(South Korea) Lee Jin-hyun	Daejeon
April	(South Korea) Na Sang-ho	Seoul	(South Korea) Cheon Seong-hoon	Incheon	(South Korea) Na Sang-ho	Seoul
May	(South Korea) Paik Seung-ho	Jeonbuk	(South Korea) Hwang Jae-won	Daegu	(South Korea) Lee Ki-je	Suwon
June	(Georgia (country)) Valeri Qazaishvili	Ulsan	(South Korea) Lee Ho-jae	Pohang	(South Korea) Joo Min-kyu	Ulsan
July	(South Korea) Na Sang-ho	Seoul	(South Korea) Kim Ju-chan	Suwon	(South Korea) Kim Ju-chan	Suwon
August	(South Korea) Lee Seung-woo	Suwon FC	(South Korea) Eom Ji-sung	Gwangju	(Brazil) Tiago Orobó	Daejeon
September	(Brazil) Zeca	Pohang	(South Korea) Heo Yool	Gwangju	(Georgia (country)) Beka Mikeltadze	Gwangju
October–December	(South Korea) Seol Young-woo	Ulsan	(South Korea) Kim Ju-chan	Suwon	(South Korea) Ki Sung-yueng	Seoul

Month	Manager of the Month			Save of the Month	
Month	Manager	Club	Div.	Player	Club
February/March	(South Korea) Hong Myung-bo	Ulsan	1	(South Korea) Kim Kyeong-min	Gwangju
April	(South Korea) Ko Jeong-woon	Gimpo	2	(South Korea) Lee Chang-geun	Daejeon
May	(South Korea) Nam Ki-il	Jeju	1	(South Korea) Hwang In-jae	Pohang
June	(South Korea) Lee Jung-hyo	Gwangju	1	(South Korea) Lee Chang-geun	Daejeon
July	(South Korea) Jo Sung-hwan	Incheon	1	(South Korea) Lee Chang-geun	Daejeon
August	(South Korea) Choi Yun-kyum	Chungbuk Cheongju	2	(South Korea) Jo Hyeon-woo	Ulsan
September	(South Korea) Park Jin-sub	Busan	2	(South Korea) Jo Hyeon-woo	Ulsan
October–December	(South Korea) Chung Jung-yong	Gimcheon	2	(South Korea) Lee Chang-geun	Daejeon

=== Annual awards ===
The 2023 K League Awards was held on 4 December 2023.

Award	Winner	Club
Most Valuable Player	(South Korea) Kim Young-gwon	Ulsan Hyundai
Young Player of the Year	(South Korea) Jeong Ho-yeon	Gwangju FC
Top goalscorer	(South Korea) Joo Min-kyu	Ulsan Hyundai
Top assist provider	(South Korea) Baek Sung-dong	Pohang Steelers
Manager of the Year	(South Korea) Hong Myung-bo	Ulsan Hyundai

Position	Best XI			
Goalkeeper	(South Korea) Jo Hyeon-woo (Ulsan)			
Defenders	(South Korea) Seol Young-woo (Ulsan)	(Australia) Alex Grant (Pohang)	(South Korea) Kim Young-gwon (Ulsan)	(Brazil) Wanderson (Pohang)
Midfielders	(South Korea) Um Won-sang (Ulsan)	(South Korea) Lee Soon-min (Gwangju)	(Brazil) Oberdan (Pohang)	(Guinea-Bissau) Gerso Fernandes (Incheon)
Forwards	(Brazil) Zeca (Pohang)		(South Korea) Joo Min-kyu (Ulsan)	

== Attendance ==
Attendants who entered with free ticket are not counted.

Pos	Team	Total	High	Low	Average	Change
1	FC Seoul	430,029	45,007	10,236	22,663	+157.9%
2	Ulsan Hyundai	345,990	30,756	5,318	18,210	+108.3%
3	Daejeon Hana Citizen	244,274	20,592	8,377	12,857	+466.4%^{†}
4	Jeonbuk Hyundai Motors	238,759	27,797	5,067	12,566	+108.8%
5	Suwon Samsung Bluewings	224,177	24,932	4,727	11,799	+101.7%
6	Daegu FC	208,340	12,334	6,943	10,965	+71.0%
7	Incheon United	169,826	15,738	5,076	8,938	+69.9%
8	Pohang Steelers	164,295	14,640	3,080	8,647	+81.1%
9	Gangwon FC	122,772	11,084	2,581	6,462	+198.5%
10	Jeju United	114,015	10,041	3,280	6,001	+90.4%
11	Suwon FC	98,580	9,221	1,605	5,188	+64.1%
12	Gwangju FC	86,090	7,357	1,871	4,831	+269.6%^{†}
	League total	2,447,147	45,007	1,605	10,733	+122.7%

Updated to games played on 1 December 2023
Source: K League
Notes:
^{†} Teams that played previous season in K League 2.

== See also ==
- 2023 in South Korean football
- 2023 Korean FA Cup
