= Kim Ju-chan =

South Korean footballer (born 2004)

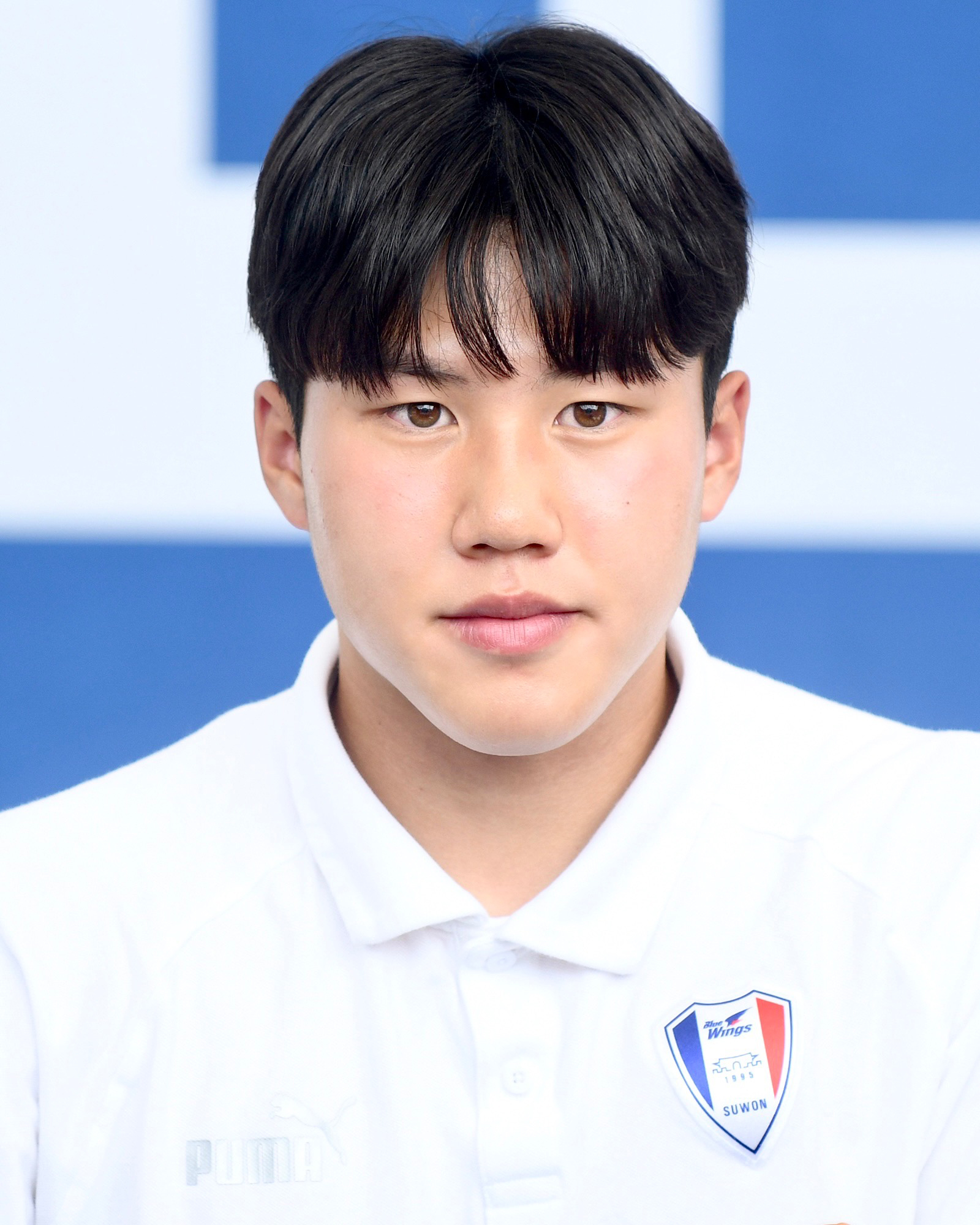
- Kim in 2023

Personal information
- Date of birth: March 29, 2004 (age 22)
- Place of birth: South Korea
- Height: 1.74 m (5 ft 8 1/2 in)
- Position: Winger

Team information
- Current team: Gimcheon Sangmu
- Number: 17

Youth career
- 2015–2017: Seryu Elementary School
- 2017–2020: Chung-Ang University Middle School
- 2020–2021: Chung-Ang University High School
- 2021–2023: Suwon High School

Senior career*
Years	Team	Apps	(Gls)
2023–	Suwon Samsung Bluewings	53	(7)
2025–	→ Gimcheon Sangmu (draft)	18	(3)

International career
2022	South Korea under-20	0	(0)
2023–	South Korea under-23	0	(0)
Korean name
Hangul	김주찬
Hanja	金主贊
RR	Gim Juchan
MR	Kim Chuch'an
- * Club domestic league appearances and goals as of August 4, 2026

Kim Ju-chan (Korean: 김주찬; born March 29, 2004) is a South Korean professional footballer who plays as a winger for K League 1 club Gimcheon Sangmu. He made his debut professional appearance in the 2023 K League 1 season with Suwon Samsung Bluewings.

== Life and career ==
=== Early life ===
Kim Ju-chan was born on March 29, 2004. He has one older sister. His family moved to Suwon when he was six years old. His father was an aspiring footballer, which influenced him to start playing the sport in 2010. Kim transferred to Seryu Elementary School after being scouted by one of its coaches. He attended Chung-Ang University Middle School and was enrolled at Chung-Ang University High School. After one year, he transferred to Suwon High School and played as a striker for its football club. Leading up to his final year in high school, he was notified of Suwon Samsung Bluewings' interest in him by his agent.

=== Senior career ===
In 2022, Kim was recruited by Suwon Samsung Bluewings as a free selection. He made his debut professional appearance in the first round of the 2023 K League 1 season as the team faced off against Gwangju FC. In May, he scored his debut goal in the fourth round of the 2023 Korean FA Cup, leading his team to a 1–0 victory against Daegu FC and advancing it into the quarterfinals.

Kim's first K League 1 goal came two months later in his twelfth appearance and first full game, where he scored the team's third goal in the 45th minute on the second half of the match, defeating Ulsan Hyundai FC 3–1. He was selected as one of the K League 1 R23 MVP Best 11 due to his performance. He scored a goal in the following round against Gangwon FC and his team won 2–1; Suwon Samsung Bluewings was granted a second consecutive victory. Having ranked last among the twelve teams in the league, Kim was credited in part for the rise in his club's ranking to number eleven after the matches.

Kim enlisted in the military football team Gimcheon Sangmu FC in April 2025 to fulfill his mandatory military service.

== International career ==
In 2022, Kim was called up to the South Korea national under-20 football team. He was one of three high school students, and the only among them not part of a squad or youth team in the top professional division. The following year, he was called up to the under-23 team for the 2024 AFC U-23 Asian Cup qualifiers.

== Style of play ==
Kim plays as a winger noted for his "exceptional" dribbling, shooting abilities, and speed. He cites Yeom Ki-hun has his favorite footballer.

== Career statistics ==
=== Club ===
As of August 4, 2026.

Club	Season	League			Cup		Continental		Other		Total	
Club	Season	Division	Apps	Goals	Apps	Goals	Apps	Goals	Apps	Goals	Apps	Goals
Suwon Samsung Bluewings	2023	K League 1	25	5	0	0	0	0	0	0	25	5
Suwon Samsung Bluewings	2024	K League 2	26	2	0	0	0	0	0	0	26	2
Suwon Samsung Bluewings	2025	K League 2	2	0	0	0	0	0	0	0	2	0
Suwon Samsung Bluewings	Total		53	7	0	0	—		—		53	7
Gimcheon Sangmu (draft)	2025	K League 1	5	1	0	0	—		—		5	1
Gimcheon Sangmu (draft)	2026	K League 1	13	2	0	0	—		—		13	2
Gimcheon Sangmu (draft)	Total		18	3	0	0	—		—		18	3
Career total			71	10	0	0	0	0	0	0	71	10
