= Mun Ji-hwan =

South Korean footballer

Personal information
- Date of birth: 26 July 1994 (age 32)
- Place of birth: Deokjin-gu, Jeonju, Jeollabuk-do, South Korea
- Height: 1.85 m (6 ft 1 in)
- Positions: Defender; midfielder

Team information
- Current team: Incheon United
- Number: 6

Youth career
- 2013–2016: Dankook University

Senior career*
Years	Team	Apps	(Gls)
2017–2019	Seongnam FC	39	(0)
2020–2021	Incheon United	27	(1)
2021–2023	→ Gimcheon Sangmu (army)	14	(0)
2023–	Incheon United	65	(4)
- * Club domestic league appearances and goals as of 6 January 2026

Mun Ji-hwan (Korean: 문지환; born 26 July 1994) is a South Korean footballer who plays for Incheon United.

== Career ==
Mun joined K League 2 side Seongnam FC before the 2017 season.

== Career statistics ==
As of 25 October 2023

Club	Season	League			National Cup		Continental		Other		Total	
Club	Season	Division	Apps	Goals	Apps	Goals	Apps	Goals	Apps	Goals	Apps	Goals
Seongnam FC	2017	K League 2	12	0	2	0	—		1	0	15	0
Seongnam FC	2018	K League 2	6	0	1	0	—		—		7	0
Seongnam FC	2019	K League 1	21	0	1	0	—		—		22	0
Seongnam FC	Total		39	0	4	0	—		1	0	44	0
Incheon United	2020	K League 1	19	0	1	0	—		—		20	0
Incheon United	2021	K League 1	8	1	1	0	—		—		9	1
Incheon United	2023	K League 1	27	2	3	0	4	0	—		34	2
Incheon United	Total		54	3	5	0	4	0	—		63	3
Gimcheon Sangmu (army)	2021	K League 2	7	1	1	0	—		—		8	1
Gimcheon Sangmu (army)	2022	K League 1	19	0	0	0	—		2	1	21	1
Gimcheon Sangmu (army)	Total		26	1	1	0	—		2	1	29	2
Career Total			119	4	10	0	4	0	3	1	136	5
