= Lucas Barcellos =

Brazilian footballer (born 1998)

Personal information
- Full name: Lucas Barcellos Damasceno
- Date of birth: 19 July 1998 (age 28)
- Place of birth: Rio de Janeiro, Brazil
- Height: 1.82 m (6 ft 0 in)
- Position: Forward

Team information
- Current team: Tokushima Vortis
- Number: 11

Youth career
- –2016: Itaboraí
- 2017: Bangu
- 2017–2019: Fluminense

Senior career*
Years	Team	Apps	(Gls)
2019–2022	Fluminense	4	(0)
2019	→ Perilima (loan)	5	(0)
2020	→ Figueirense (loan)	13	(3)
2021	→ Confiança (loan)	10	(5)
2022	CSA	37	(7)
2023–2024	Daegu FC	48	(6)
2025–	Tokushima Vortis	49	(24)
- * Club domestic league appearances and goals as of 14 August 2026

Lucas Barcellos Damasceno (born 19 July 1998) is a Brazilian professional footballer who plays for Japan club Tokushima Vortis as a forward.

== Career statistics ==
=== Club ===
As of match played 10 November 2024.

Appearances and goals by club, season and competition
Club	Season	League			State League		Cup		Continental		Other		Total	
Club	Season	Division	Apps	Goals	Apps	Goals	Apps	Goals	Apps	Goals	Apps	Goals	Apps	Goals
Fluminense	2019	Série A	0	0	—		0	0	—		—		0	0
Fluminense	2020	Série A	—		4 (Note: Appearances in the Campeonato Carioca)	0	0	0	0	0	—		4	0
Fluminense	Total		0	0	4	0	0	0	0	0	—		4	0
Perilima (loan)	2019	Paraibano	—		5 (Note: Appearances in the Campeonato Paraibano)	0	—		—		—		5	0
Figueirense (loan)	2020	Série B	13	3	—		—		—		—		13	3
Confiança (loan)	2021	Série B	2	0	8 (Note: Appearances in the Campeonato Sergipano)	5	1	0	—		7 (Note: Appearances in the Copa do Nordeste)	0	18	5
CSA (loan)	2022	Série B	26	6	10 (Note: Appearances in the Campeonato Alagoano)	1	3	1	—		8	2	47	10
Daegu FC	2023	K League 1	31	5	—		2	1	—		—		33	6
Daegu FC	2024	K League 1	17	1	—		1	0	—		—		18	1
Daegu FC	Total		48	6	—		3	1	—		—		51	7
Career total			89	15	27	6	7	2	0	0	15	2	138	25
