= Chung Woon =

South Korean footballer (born 1989)

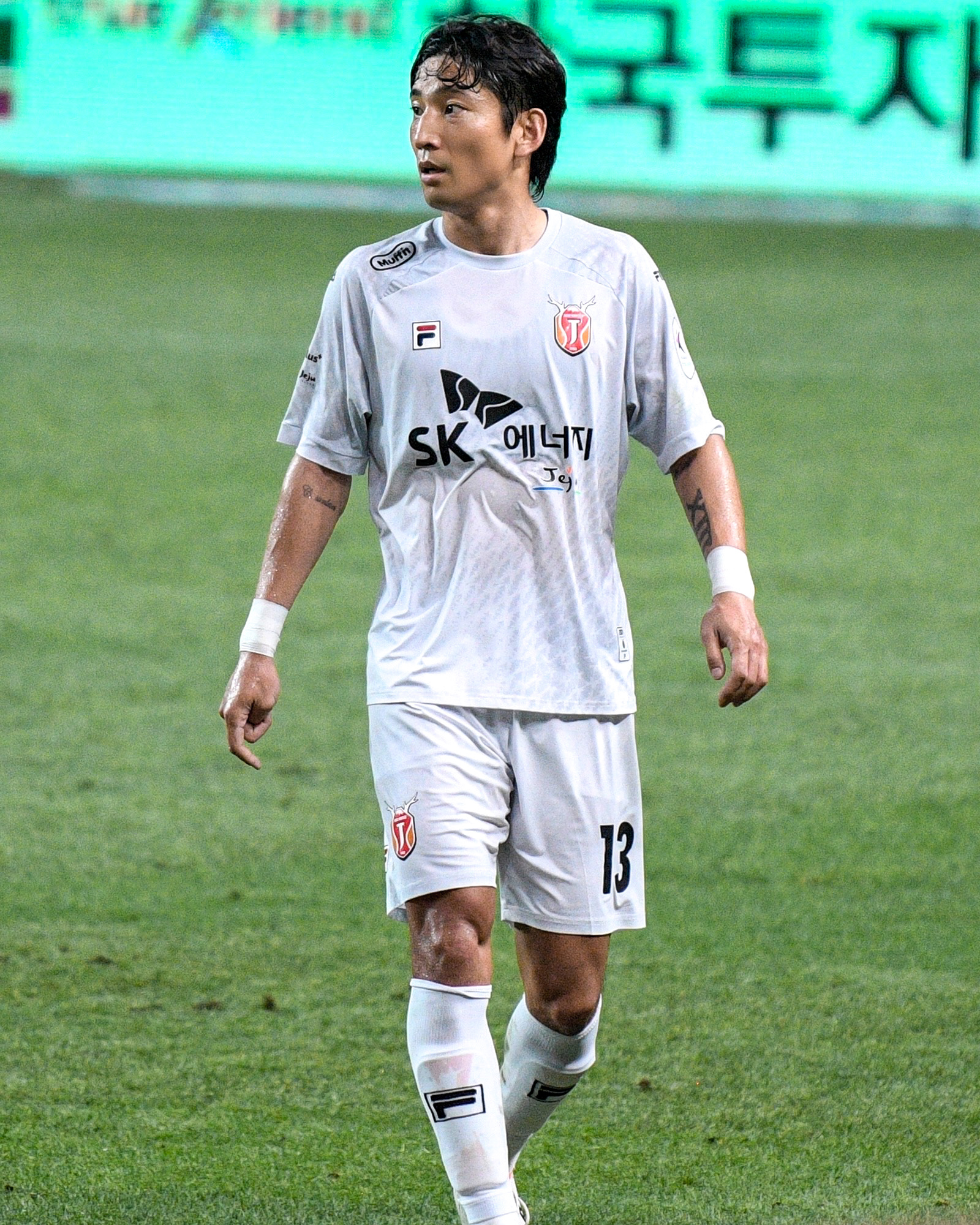
- Chung in 2024

Personal information
- Date of birth: 30 June 1989 (age 37)
- Place of birth: Ulsan, South Korea
- Height: 1.80 m (5 ft 11 in)
- Position: Left-back

Team information
- Current team: Jeju United
- Number: 13

Youth career
- –2002: Hakseong Elementary School
- 2002–2005: Hyundai Middle School
- 2005–2008: Hyundai High School
- 2008–2011: Myongji University

Senior career*
| Years | Team | Apps | (Gls) |
| 2012 | Ulsan Hyundai | 0 | (0) |
| 2013–2015 | Istra 1961 | 54 | (1) |
| 2015–2016 | RNK Split | 21 | (0) |
| 2016– | Jeju United | 223 | (7) |
| 2018–2019 | → Gimpo Citizen (draft) | 0 | (0) |
- * Club domestic league appearances and goals as of 5 January 2026

- Chung Woon
- Hangul: 정운
- Hanja: 鄭澐
- RR: Jeong Un
- MR: Chŏng Un

Chung Woon (Korean: 정운; born 30 June 1989) is a South Korean footballer who plays as a left-back for Jeju United.

== Club career ==
Chung Woon started playing football at Hakseong Elementary School, close to the Ulsan Hyundai, going on to the Hyundai Middle and High schools, before going to Myongji University in Seoul. He was drafted in the 2012 K League draft by Ulsan Hyundai as a 2008 secured player, officially having replaced at some point another player. His career at his hometown club only lasted during the 2012 season, being unable to secure a single first team cap.

He went to Croatia in early 2013 and passed a trial with the Prva HNL team Istra 1961 from Pula, signing a two-and-a-half-year contract. He quickly established himself as the first choice on the left-back, but also made rare appearances on both wings and on centre-back positions, and kept his position at the beginning of the 2013–14 season. He made what was both his first-team and professional debut on 23 February 2013 in a goalless away draw with Osijek, coming for Adnan Aganović in the 67th minute, and scored his first goal in another away match against the same team, on 18 August 2013, scoring his team's third goal in a 3–1 win.

After two years with Istra 1961, Woon moved to RNK Split, along with his teammate Slavko Blagojević, signing a three-and-a-half-year contract.

== Career statistics ==
=== Club ===
As of 27 May 2024

| Club | Season | League | | | Cup | | Continental | | Total | |
| Club | Season | Division | Apps | Goals | Apps | Goals | Apps | Goals | Apps | Goals |
|---|---|---|---|---|---|---|---|---|---|---|
| Ulsan | 2012 | K League 1 | 0 | 0 | — | | 0 | 0 | 0 | 0 |
| Istra 1961 | 2012-13 | First Croatian Football League | 12 | 0 | — | | — | | 12 | 0 |
| Istra 1961 | 2013-14 | First Croatian Football League | 26 | 1 | 4 | 0 | — | | 30 | 1 |
| Istra 1961 | 2014-15 | First Croatian Football League | 16 | 0 | 2 | 0 | — | | 18 | 0 |
| Istra 1961 | Total | | 54 | 1 | 6 | 0 | — | | 60 | 1 |
| RNK Split | 2014-15 | First Croatian Football League | 9 | 0 | 4 | 0 | — | | 13 | 0 |
| RNK Split | 2015-16 | First Croatian Football League | 12 | 0 | — | | — | | 12 | 0 |
| RNK Split | Total | | 21 | 0 | 4 | 0 | — | | 25 | 0 |
| Jeju United | 2016 | K League 1 | 32 | 1 | — | | — | | 32 | 1 |
| Jeju United | 2017 | K League 1 | 30 | 1 | 1 | 0 | 6 (Note: Appearances in AFC Champions League) | 1 | 37 | 2 |
| Jeju United | 2018 | K League 1 | 12 | 0 | — | | 2 | 0 | 14 | 0 |
| Jeju United | 2020 | K League 2 | 24 | 2 | 1 | 0 | — | | 25 | 2 |
| Jeju United | 2021 | K League 1 | 35 | 1 | — | | — | | 35 | 1 |
| Jeju United | 2022 | K League 1 | 32 | 0 | 1 | 0 | — | | 33 | 0 |
| Jeju United | 2023 | K League 1 | 25 | 2 | 3 | 0 | — | | 28 | 2 |
| Jeju United | 2024 | K League 1 | 6 | 0 | — | | — | | 6 | 0 |
| Jeju United | Total | | 207 | 7 | 6 | 0 | 8 | 1 | 221 | 8 |
