= Yuri Tanque =

Brazilian footballer

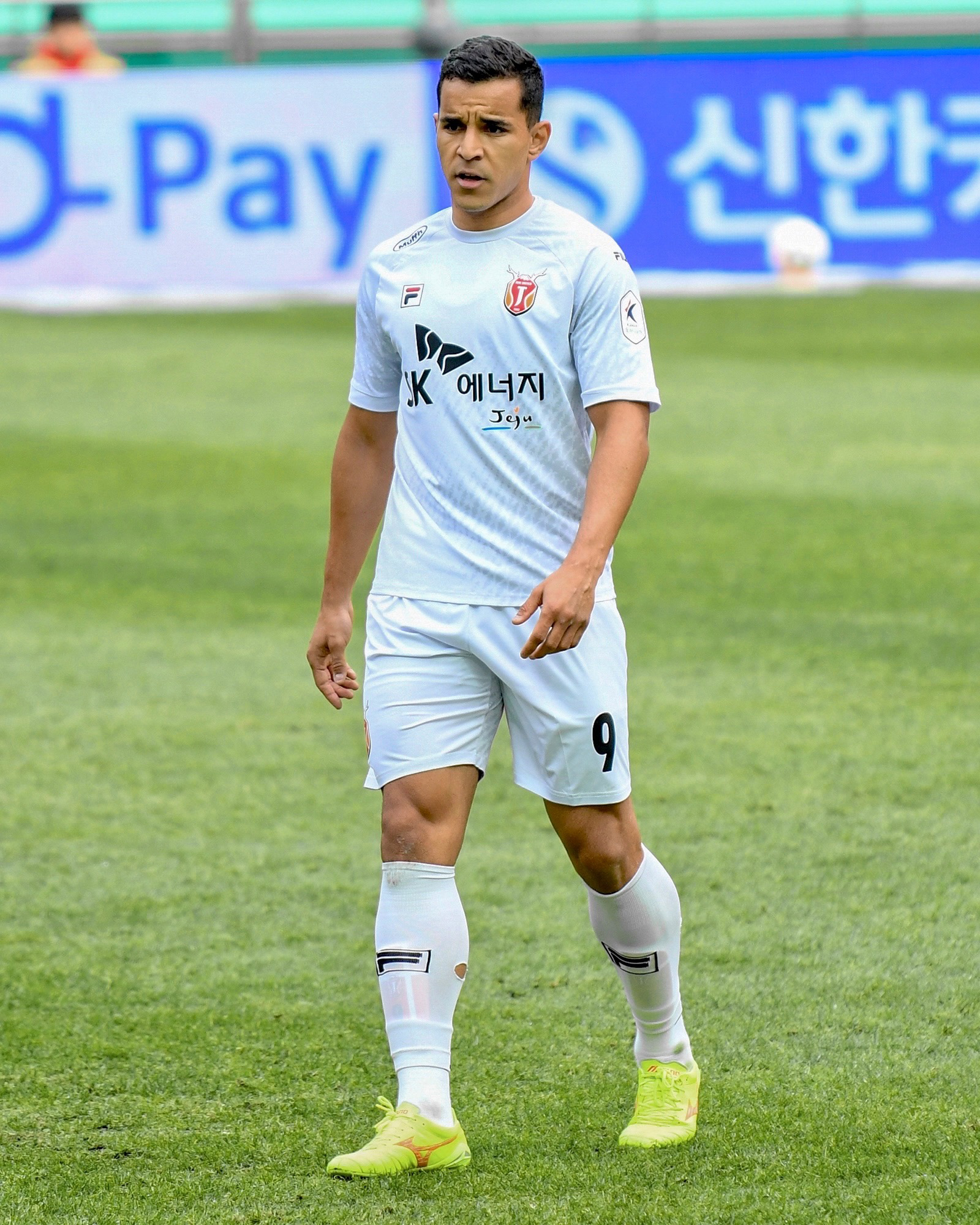
- Yuri in 2024

Personal information
- Full name: Yuri Jonathan Vitor Coelho
- Date of birth: 12 June 1998 (age 28)
- Place of birth: Nova Era, Brazil
- Height: 1.85 m (6 ft 1 in)
- Position: Forward

Team information
- Current team: Criciúma
- Number: 90

Senior career*
| Years | Team | Apps | (Gls) |
| 2017–2018 | Ponte Preta | 3 | (0) |
| 2018–2022 | Coimbra | 5 | (0) |
| 2019 | → Gainare Tottori (loan) | 13 | (2) |
| 2020–2021 | → Ferroviária (loan) | 5 | (0) |
| 2021 | → Ferroviária (loan) | 2 | (0) |
| 2021–2022 | → Leixões (loan) | 4 | (0) |
| 2022 | → Capivariano (loan) | 19 | (10) |
| 2022–2023 | Estrela da Amadora | 0 | (0) |
| 2022 | → Guarani (loan) | 17 | (7) |
| 2023–2025 | Jeju SK | 90 | (27) |
| 2026– | Criciúma | 0 | (0) |
- * Club domestic league appearances and goals as of 5 January 2026

Yuri Jonathan Vitor Coelho (born 12 June 1998), commonly known as Yuri Tanque, is a Brazilian footballer who plays as a forward for Criciúma.

== Career ==
Having started his career at Ponte Preta, Tanque particularly distinguished himself while playing for Jeju United in the K League 1 and for Capivariano, where he was the top scorer of the 2022 edition of Campeonato Paulista Série A3. For the 2026 season, he signed a contract with Criciúma.

== Career statistics ==
As of 2 December 2023

Appearances and goals by club, season and competition
| Club | Season | League | | | State League | | National cup | | League cup | | Continental | | Other | | Total | |
| Club | Season | Division | Apps | Goals | Apps | Goals | Apps | Goals | Apps | Goals | Apps | Goals | Apps | Goals | Apps | Goals |
|---|---|---|---|---|---|---|---|---|---|---|---|---|---|---|---|---|
| Ponte Preta | 2017 | Série A | 3 | 0 | 4 (Note: Appearances in the Campeonato Paulista) | 1 | 0 | 0 | – | | 3 (Note: Appearances in the Copa Sudamericana) | 0 | – | | 10 | 1 |
| Ponte Preta | 2018 | Série B | 0 | 0 | 10 | 1 | 4 (Note: Appearances in the Copa do Brasil) | 1 | – | | – | | – | | 14 | 2 |
| Ponte Preta | Total | | 3 | 0 | 14 | 2 | 4 | 1 | 0 | 0 | 3 | 0 | 0 | 0 | 24 | 3 |
| Coimbra | 2021 | – | | | 5 (Note: Appearances in the Campeonato Mineiro) | 0 | 0 | 0 | – | | – | | – | | 5 | 0 |
| Gainare Tottori (loan) | 2019 | J3 League | 13 | 2 | – | | 0 | 0 | – | | – | | – | | 13 | 2 |
| Ferroviária (loan) | 2020 | – | | | 5 | 0 | 0 | 0 | – | | – | | – | | 5 | 0 |
| Ferroviária (loan) | 2021 | Série D | 2 | 0 | – | | – | | – | | – | | – | | 2 | 0 |
| Leixões (loan) | 2021–22 | Liga Portugal 2 | 4 | 0 | – | | 3 (Note: Appearances in the Taça de Portugal) | 1 | 0 | 0 | – | | – | | 7 | 1 |
| Capivariano (loan) | 2022 | – | | | 19 | 10 | – | | – | | – | | – | | 19 | 10 |
| Guarani (loan) | 2022 | Série B | 17 | 7 | – | | – | | – | | – | | – | | 14 | 2 |
| Jeju United | 2023 | K League 1 | 33 | 10 | – | | 4 (Note: Appearances in the Korean FA Cup) | 1 | – | | – | | – | | 37 | 11 |
| Career total | | | 72 | 19 | 43 | 12 | 11 | 3 | 0 | 0 | 3 | 0 | 0 | 0 | 129 | 34 |
