= Hong Si-hoo =

South Korean footballer (born 2001)

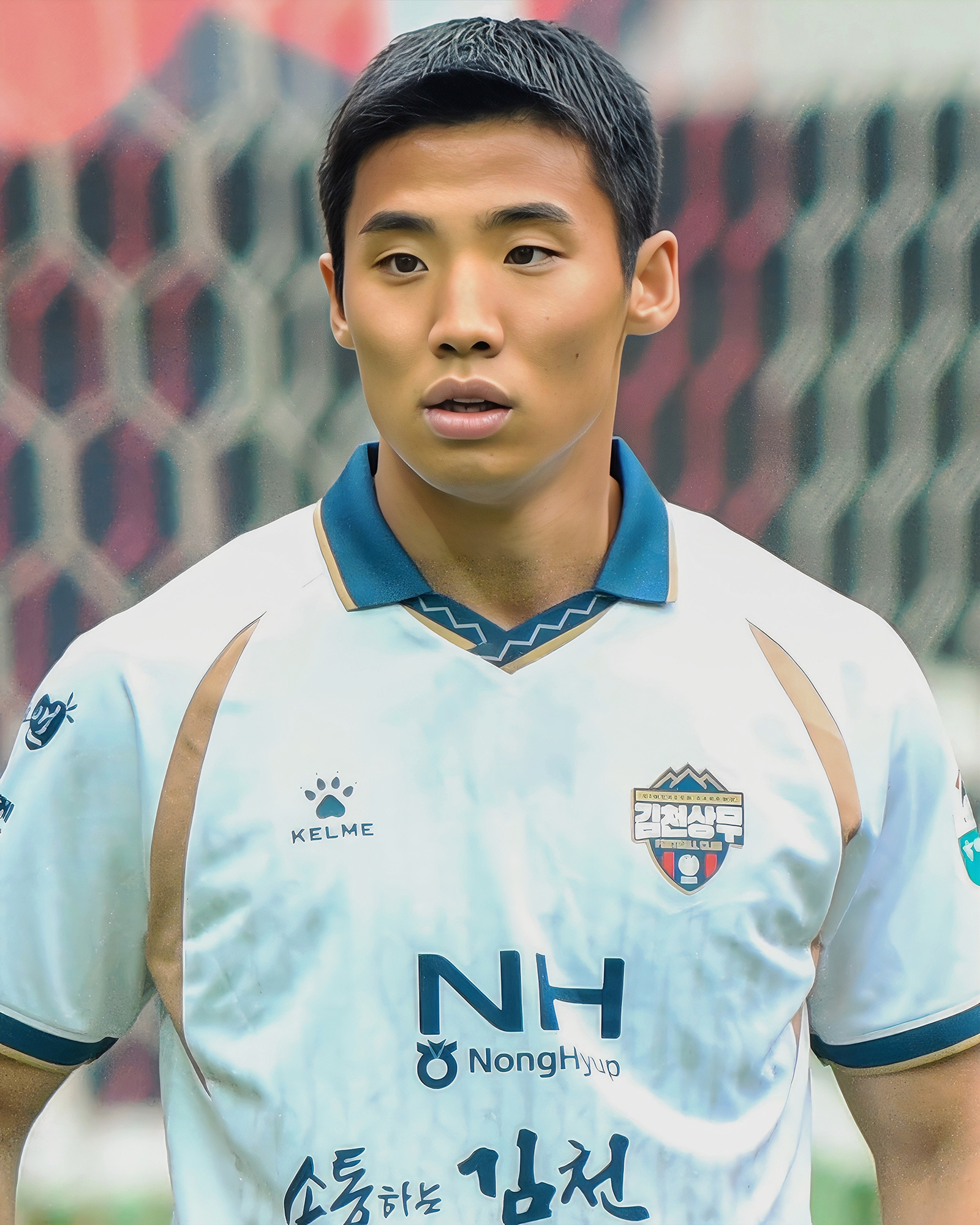
- Hong in 2026

Personal information
- Full name: Hong Si-hoo
- Date of birth: 8 January 2001 (age 25)
- Place of birth: Seoul, South Korea
- Height: 1.75 m (5 ft 9 in)
- Position: Forward

Team information
- Current team: Gimcheon Sangmu (on loan from Incheon United /in army)
- Number: 42

Youth career
- 2012–2013: Seoul Dongmyeong Elementary School
- 2014–2016: Cheonan Football Center
- 2017–2019: Sangmoon High School

Senior career*
Years	Team	Apps	(Gls)
2020–2021	Seongnam FC	37	(1)
2022–	Incheon United	64	(3)
2025	→ Gimpo (loan)	7	(0)
2025–	→ Gimcheon Sangmu (army)	7	(0)

International career^{‡}
2021–2024	South Korea U23	6	(2)
- * Club domestic league appearances and goals as of 4 August 2026 ‡ National team caps and goals as of 29 March 2023 (UTC)

Hong Si-hoo (Korean: 홍시후; born 8 January 2001) is a South Korean professional footballer who plays as a midfielder for K League 1 side Gimcheon Sangmu, on loan from Incheon United, where he hold his army-duty.

== Club career ==
Hong made his professional debut for K League 1 side Seongnam on 9 May 2020 against Gwangju. He came on as a 76th minute substitute for Choe Byeong-chan as Seongnam won 2–0.

== Career statistics ==
=== Club ===
As of match played 11 June 2023

Appearances and goals by club, season and competition
Club	Season	League			National cup		Continental		Total	
Club	Season	Division	Apps	Goals	Apps	Goals	Apps	Goals	Apps	Goals
Seongnam FC	2020	K League 1	12	1	1	0	—		13	1
Seongnam FC	2021	K League 1	25	0	2	0	—		27	0
Incheon United	2022	K League 1	28	1	1	1	—		29	2
Incheon United	2023	K League 1	8	1	1	1	—		9	2
Career total			73	3	5	2	0	0	78	5
