= Kim Han-gil (footballer) =

South Korean footballer (born 1995)

Personal information
- Date of birth: 21 June 1995 (age 31)
- Place of birth: Incheon, South Korea
- Height: 1.78 m (5 ft 10 in)
- Position: Midfielder

Team information
- Current team: Yongin FC
- Number: 22

Youth career
- 2014–2016: Ajou University

Senior career*
Years	Team	Apps	(Gls)
2017–2020	FC Seoul	34	(1)
2020–2022	Jeonnam Dragons	8	(0)
2021–2022	→ Gimcheon Sangmu (army)	39	(0)
2023–2025	Gwangju FC	66	(3)
2026–	Yongin FC	14	(0)

International career
2013	South Korea U-20	0	(0)
2017–2018	South Korea U-23	0	(0)
- * Club domestic league appearances and goals as of 6 August 2026

- Kim Han-gil
- Hangul: 김한길
- Hanja: 金한길
- RR: Gim Hangil
- MR: Kim Han'gil

Kim Han-gil (Korean: 김한길; born 21 June 1995) is a South Korean footballer who plays as a midfielder for Yongin FC.

== Club career ==
=== FC Seoul ===
Kim Han-gil made his debut in the K League 1, against Suwon Samsung Bluewings on March 5, 2017.

== Career statistics ==
As of 3 December 2023.

Club	Season	League			Cup		Continental		Other		Total	
Club	Season	Division	Apps	Goals	Apps	Goals	Apps	Goals	Apps	Goals	Apps	Goals
FC Seoul	2017	K League 1	10	0	0	0	2	0	—		12	0
FC Seoul	2018	K League 1	12	1	1	0	—		1	0	14	1
FC Seoul	2019	K League 1	12	0	0	0	—		—		12	0
FC Seoul	2020	K League 1	4	0	—		2	0	—		6	0
FC Seoul	Total		38	1	1	0	4	0	1	0	44	1
Jeonnam Dragons	2020	K League 2	3	0	0	0	—		—		3	0
Jeonnam Dragons	2021	K League 2	5	0	3	1	—		—		8	1
Jeonnam Dragons	Summate		8	0	3	1	—		—		11	1
Gimcheon Sangmu (army)	2021	K League 2	3	0	1	0	—		—		4	0
Gimcheon Sangmu (army)	2022	K League 1	34	2	1	0	—		2	0	37	2
Gimcheon Sangmu (army)	Total		37	2	2	0	—		2	0	41	1
Gwangju FC	2023	K League 1	29	3	1	0	—		—		30	3
Career total			112	6	7	1	4	0	3	0	126	7
