= Zeca (footballer, born 1997) =

Brazilian footballer (born 1997)

Personal information
- Full name: José Joaquim de Carvalho
- Date of birth: 6 March 1997 (age 29)
- Place of birth: Salvador, Brazil
- Height: 1.92 m (6 ft 4 in)
- Position: Forward

Team information
- Current team: Shandong Taishan
- Number: 19

Youth career
- Bahia
- 2017: Vitória

Senior career*
Years	Team	Apps	(Gls)
2016	Bahia	0	(0)
2016	→ Ypiranga-BA (loan)	5	(2)
2017–2019	Boavista B	39	(16)
2019–2020	Goiás	4	(0)
2020	→ Criciúma (loan)	8	(0)
2021	Oeste	27	(4)
2021	Londrina	10	(5)
2022	Mirassol	11	(6)
2022	→ Daegu (loan)	28	(7)
2023	Pohang Steelers	37	(12)
2024–	Shandong Taishan	50	(22)
- * Club domestic league appearances and goals as of 8 November 2026

José Joaquim de Carvalho (born 6 March 1997), commonly known as Zeca, is a Brazilian professional footballer who plays as a forward for Chinese Super League club Shandong Taishan.

== Club career ==
Zeca was born in Salvador, Bahia, and was a Bahia youth graduate. He made his senior debut while on loan at Ypiranga-BA in 2016, but later moved to Vitória and returned to the youth setup.

In 2017, Zeca moved abroad and joined Portuguese side Boavista, being assigned to the reserve team. He returned to his home country in 2019, signing for Goiás and being initially a part of the under-23 team.

Zeca was definitely promoted to the main squad for the 2020 season, and made his Série A debut on 12 August of that year, coming on as a late substitute for Vinícius Lopes in a 1–2 away loss against Athletico Paranaense. After featuring in a further two top tier matches, he was loaned to Série C side Criciúma.

On 17 February 2021, Zeca agreed to a contract with Oeste also in the third division. A regular starter, he moved to Londrina in the Série B on 29 September, and was an important unit as the club narrowly avoided relegation in the last round.

On 31 December 2021, Zeca signed for Mirassol. The following 27 March, after scoring six goals in the 2022 Campeonato Paulista, he was loaned to South Korean side Daegu FC until the end of the year.

On 6 January 2023, Zeca officially returned to the K League, joining Pohang Steelers on a permanent deal.

On 26 January 2024, Zeca joined Chinese Super League club Shandong Taishan.

== Career statistics ==
As of match played 8 November 2026

Appearances and goals by club, season and competition
Club	Season	League			State League		National cup		Continental		Other		Total	
Club	Season	Division	Apps	Goals	Apps	Goals	Apps	Goals	Apps	Goals	Apps	Goals	Apps	Goals
Ypiranga-BA	2016	Baiano 2ª Divisão	—		5	2	—		—		—		5	2
Boavista B	2017–18	AF Porto Divisão de Elite	14	3	—		—		—		—		14	3
Boavista B	2018–19	AF Porto Divisão de Elite	25	13	—		—		—		—		25	13
Boavista B	Total		39	16	—		—		—		—		39	16
Goiás	2019	Série A	0	0	—		—		—		2 (Note: Appearance(s) in Copa Verde)	0	2	0
Goiás	2020	Série A	3	0	1	0	0	0	—		—		4	0
Goiás	Total		3	0	1	0	0	0	—		2	0	6	0
Criciúma	2020	Série C	8	0	—		—		—		—		8	0
Oeste	2021	Serie C	14	1	13	3	—		—		—		27	4
Londrina	2021	Série B	10	5	—		—		—		—		10	5
Mirassol	2022	Série C	0	0	11	6	2	0	—		—		13	6
Daegu FC (loan)	2022	K League 1	28	7	—		3	2	7 (Note: Appearance(s) in AFC Champions League)	7	—		38	16
Pohang Steelers	2023	K League 1	37	12	—		3	2	4	3	—		44	17
Shandong Taishan	2024	Chinese Super League	4	1	—		1	1	5	1	—		10	3
Shandong Taishan	2025	Chinese Super League	23	12	—		2	0	1	1	—		26	13
Shandong Taishan	2026	Chinese Super League	23	9	—		3	3	—		—		26	12
Shandong Taishan	Total		50	22	—		6	4	6	2	—		62	28
Career total			189	63	31	11	12	8	17	12	2	0	251	94

== Honours ==
Londrina

- Campeonato Paranaense: 2014

Operário Ferroviário

- Campeonato Brasileiro Série D: 2017
- Campeonato Paranaense Segunda Divisão: 2018
- Campeonato Brasileiro Série C: 2018

Ypiranga-RS

- Campeonato Gaúcho Série A2: 2019

Pohang Steelers

- Korean FA Cup winner 2023

Individual

- K League 1 Best XI: 2023
