= Jeong Ho-yeon =

South Korean footballer (born 2000)

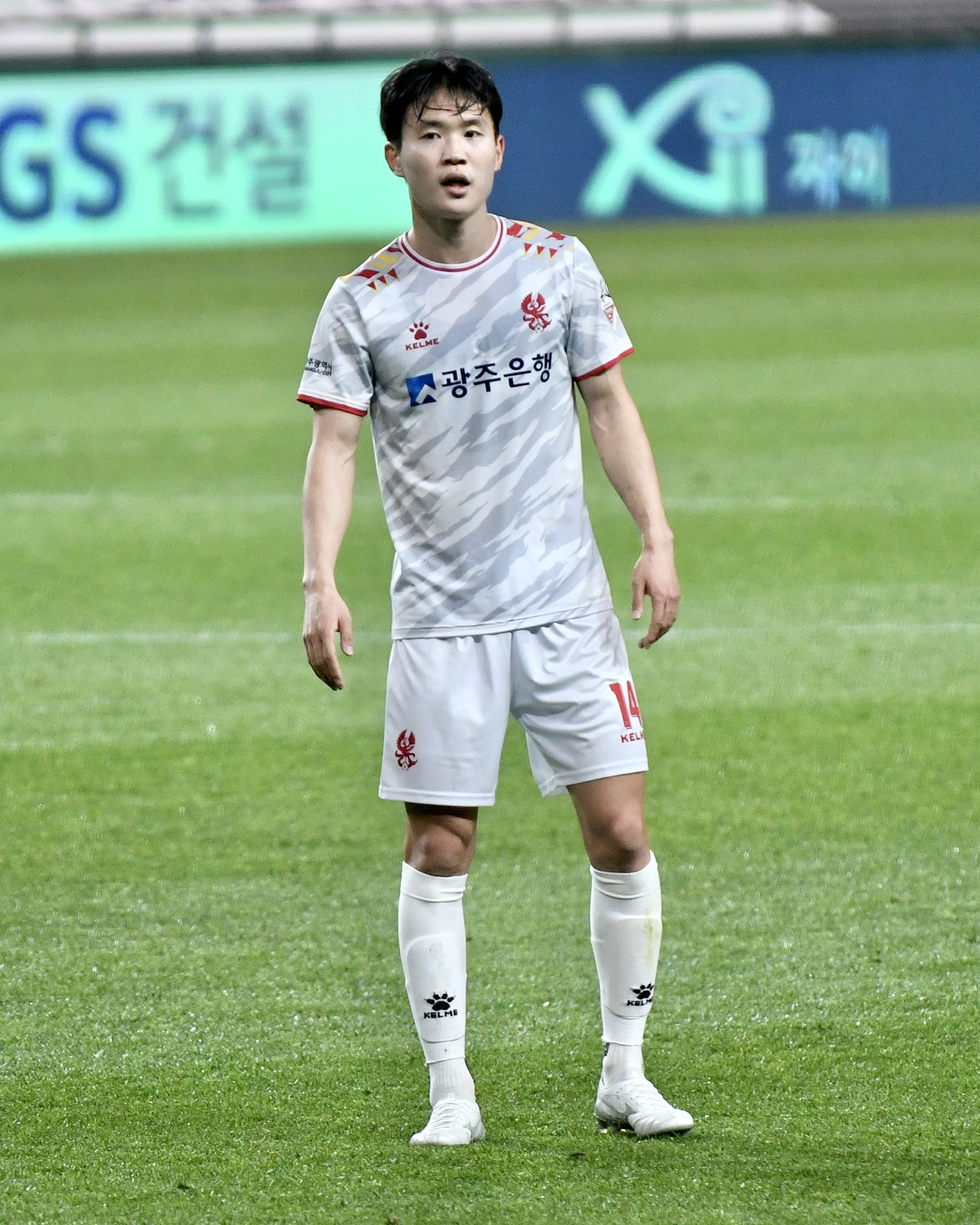
- Jeong in 2023

Personal information
- Date of birth: 28 September 2000 (age 26)
- Place of birth: Mokpo, Jeonnam, South Korea
- Height: 1.80 m (5 ft 11 in)
- Position: Midfielder

Team information
- Current team: Suwon Samsung Bluewings (on loan from Minnesota United)
- Number: 14

Youth career
- 2016–2019: Kumho High School
- 2019–2022: Dankook University

Senior career*
Years	Team	Apps	(Gls)
2022–2024	Gwangju FC	106	(3)
2025–	Minnesota United	4	(0)
2025	Minnesota United 2	2	(0)
2026–	→ Suwon Samsung Bluewings (loan)	18	(1)

International career^{‡}
2022–	South Korea U23	9	(0)
2024–	South Korea	1	(0)
Medal record
Men's football
Representing South Korea
Asian Games
Gold medal – first place	2022 Hangzhou	Team
- * Club domestic league appearances and goals as of 5 August 2026 ‡ National team caps and goals as of 26 March 2024

- Jeong Ho-yeon
- Hangul: 정호연
- RR: Jeong Hoyeon
- MR: Chŏng Hoyŏn

Jeong Ho-yeon (Korean: 정호연; born 28 September 2000) is a South Korean footballer who plays as a midfielder for K League 2 club Suwon Samsung Bluewings, on loan from Major League Soccer club Minnesota United and the South Korea national team.

== Style of play ==
He shows how active he is to match the central midfielder. He still shows the highest amount of activity in the K-League, and plays an important role in linking defense and offense.

== International career ==
Jeong made his debut for the senior South Korea national team on 26 March 2024 in a World Cup qualifier against Thailand.

== Career statistics ==
As of 15 June 2025

Appearances and goals by club, season and competition
Club	Season	League			Cup (Note: Includes Korean FA Cup, U.S. Open Cup)		Continental		Play-offs		Total	
Club	Season	Division	Apps	Goals	Apps	Goals	Apps	Goals	Apps	Goals	Apps	Goals
Gwangju FC	2022	K League 2	36	1	1	0	—		—		37	1
Gwangju FC	2023	K League 1	34	2	0	0	—		—		34	2
Gwangju FC	2024	K League 1	36	0	0	0	6 (Note: Appearances in AFC Champions League Elite)	0	—		42	0
Gwangju FC	Total		106	3	1	0	6	0	—		113	3
Minnesota United	2025	MLS	4	0	2	0	—		—		6	0
Minnesota United 2	2025	MLS Next Pro	2	0	—		—		—		2	0
Career total			112	3	3	0	6	0	0	0	121	3

== Honours ==
Gwangju FC

- K League 2: 2022

South Korea U23

- Asian Games: 2022

Individual

- K League Young Player of the Year: 2023
