= Kim Bong-soo (footballer, born 1999) =

South Korean footballer

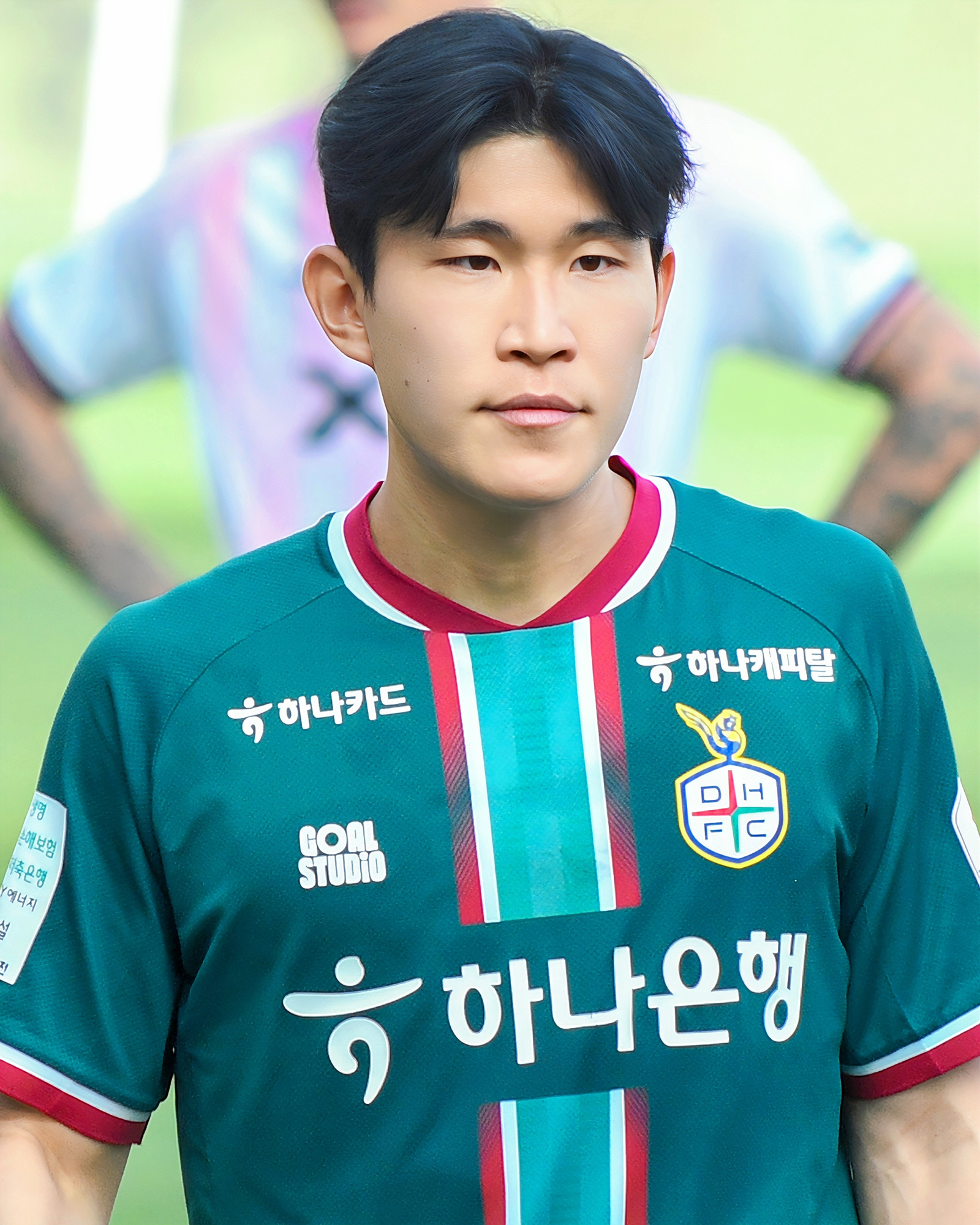
- Kim in 2026

Personal information
- Date of birth: December 26, 1999 (age 26)
- Place of birth: Daegu, South Korea
- Height: 1.83 m (6 ft 0 in)
- Positions: Defensive midfielder; centre-back

Team information
- Current team: Daejeon Hana Citizen
- Number: 30

Youth career
- 2015–2017: Daegu Technical High School
- 2018–2020: Gwangju University

Senior career*
Years	Team	Apps	(Gls)
2021–2025	Jeju United	96	(5)
2024–2025	→ Gimcheon Sangmu (draft)	53	(0)
2025–	Daejeon Hana Citizen	52	(0)

International career^{‡}
2023	South Korea U23	2	(0)
2025–	South Korea	7	(0)
Korean name
Hangul	김봉수
Hanja	金奉首
RR	Gim Bongsu
MR	Kim Pongsu
- * Club domestic league appearances and goals as of 8 November 2026 ‡ National team caps and goals as of 17 November 2026

Kim Bong-soo (Korean: 김봉수; born December 26, 1999) is a South Korean professional footballer who plays as a defensive midfielder or centre-back playing for Daejeon Hana Citizen of the K League 1 and the South Korea national team.

== Career statistics ==
=== Club ===
As of 3 November 2026.

Club	Season	League			Cup		Continental		Other		Total	
Club	Season	Division	Apps	Goals	Apps	Goals	Apps	Goals	Apps	Goals	Apps	Goals
Jeju United	2021	K League 1	28	3	0	0	—		—		28	3
Jeju United	2022	K League 1	33	0	2	1	—		—		35	1
Jeju United	2023	K League 1	35	2	4	0	—		—		39	2
Jeju United	Total		96	5	6	1	—		—		102	6
Gimcheon Sangmu (draft)	2024	K League 1	38	0	0	0	—		—		38	0
Gimcheon Sangmu (draft)	2025	K League 1	15	0	0	0	—		—		15	0
Gimcheon Sangmu (draft)	Total		53	0	0	0	—		—		53	0
Daejeon Hana Citizen	2025	K League 1	20	0	0	0	—		—		20	0
Daejeon Hana Citizen	2026	K League 1	32	0	1	0	4 (Note: Appearance in AFC Champions League Elite)	0	1 (Note: Appearance in K League Super Cup)	0	38	0
Daejeon Hana Citizen	Total		52	0	1	0	4	0	1	0	58	0
Career total			201	5	7	1	4	0	1	0	213	6
