= Kim Bo-sub =

South Korean footballer

Personal information
- Date of birth: 10 January 1998 (age 28)
- Place of birth: Incheon, South Korea
- Height: 1.83 m (6 ft 0 in)
- Position: Midfielder

Team information
- Current team: Yongin
- Number: 27

Youth career
- 2014–2016: Incheon Daegun High School

Senior career*
| Years | Team | Apps | (Gls) |
| 2017–2025 | Incheon United | 162 | (11) |
| 2020–2021 | → Sangju / Gimcheon Sangmu (army) | 23 | (1) |
| 2026– | Yongin | 19 | (0) |
Korean name
| Hangul | 김보섭 |
| Hanja | 金甫燮 |
| RR | Gim Boseop |
| MR | Kim Posŏp |
- * Club domestic league appearances and goals as of 6 August 2026 ‡ National team caps and goals as of April 12, 2019

Kim Bo-sub (Korean: 김보섭; born 10 January 1998) is a South Korean football midfielder who plays for Yongin.

== Career statistics ==
As of match played on 12 March 2023

Club statistics
| Club | Season | League | | | National Cup | | Other | | Total | |
| Club | Season | Division | Apps | Goals | Apps | Goals | Apps | Goals | Apps | Goals |
|---|---|---|---|---|---|---|---|---|---|---|
| Incheon United | 2017 | K League Classic | 2 | 0 | 1 | 0 | — | | 3 | 0 |
| Incheon United | 2018 | K League 1 | 21 | 2 | 2 | 0 | — | | 23 | 2 |
| Incheon United | 2019 | K League 1 | 13 | 0 | 0 | 0 | — | | 13 | 0 |
| Incheon United | 2020 | K League 1 | 0 | 0 | 0 | 0 | — | | 0 | 0 |
| Incheon United | 2021 | K League 1 | 15 | 0 | 0 | 0 | — | | 15 | 0 |
| Incheon United | 2022 | K League 1 | 34 | 5 | 0 | 0 | — | | 34 | 5 |
| Incheon United | 2023 | K League 1 | 4 | 0 | 0 | 0 | — | | 4 | 0 |
| Total | | | 89 | 7 | 3 | 0 | 0 | 0 | 92 | 7 |
| Sangju Samgmu (loan) | 2020 | K League 1 | 17 | 1 | 0 | 0 | — | | 17 | 1 |
| Sangju Samgmu (loan) | 2021 | K League 2 | 6 | 0 | 2 | 0 | — | | 8 | 0 |
| Sangju Samgmu (loan) | Total | | 23 | 1 | 2 | 0 | 0 | 0 | 25 | 1 |
| Career totals | | | 112 | 8 | 5 | 0 | 0 | 0 | 117 | 8 |
