= Tiago Orobó =

Brazilian footballer (born 1993)

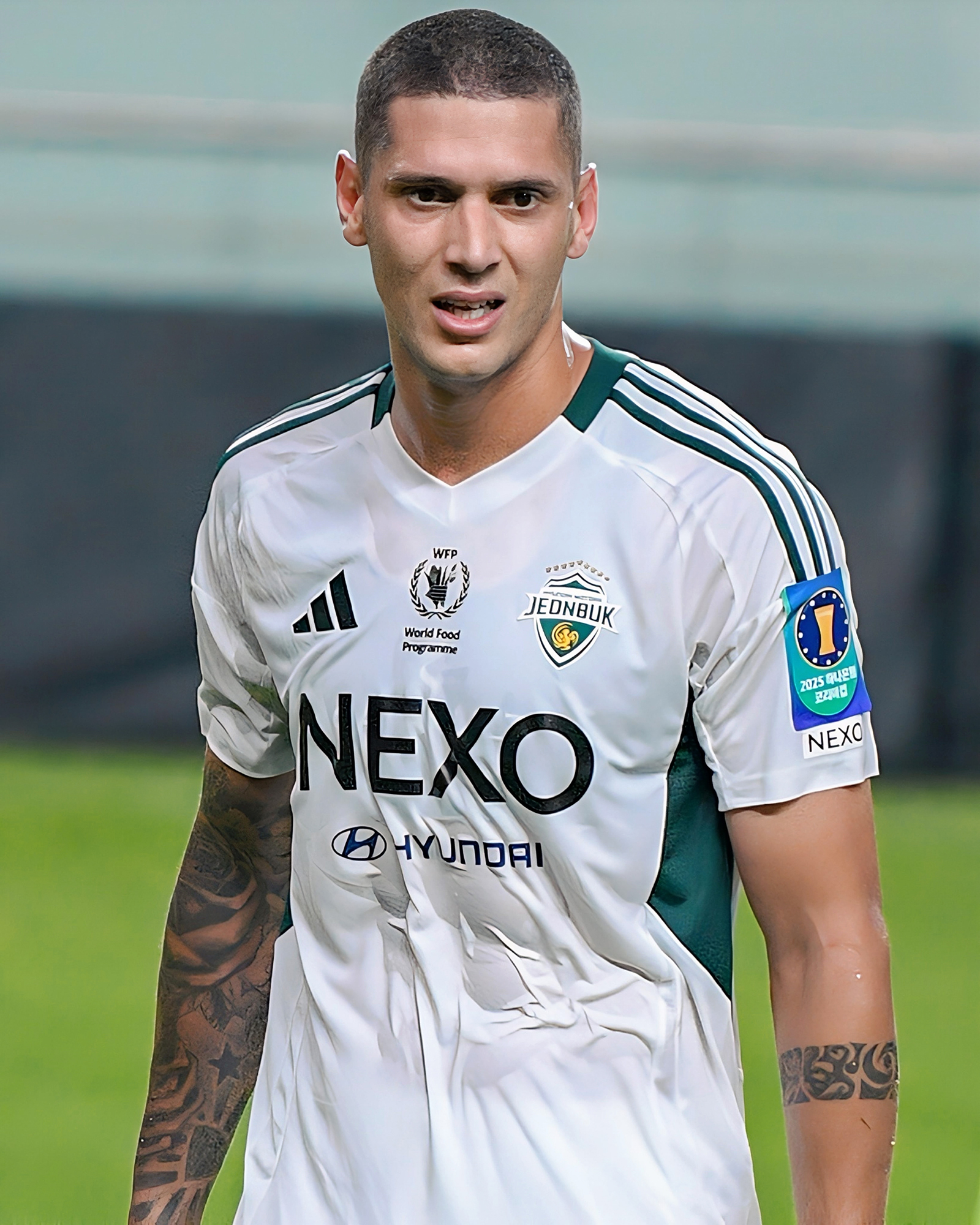
- Orobó in 2025

Personal information
- Full name: Tiago Pereira da Silva
- Date of birth: 28 October 1993 (age 33)
- Place of birth: Orobó, Brazil
- Height: 1.90 m (6 ft 3 in)
- Position: Forward

Team information
- Current team: Jeonbuk Hyundai Motors
- Number: 9

Senior career*
Years	Team	Apps	(Gls)
2012	Araripina	5	(0)
2012–2014	Porto de Caruaru	24	(1)
2014	→ Socorrense (loan)	14	(5)
2014–2015	Socorrense	17	(5)
2015–2016	Coruripe	0	(0)
2016	Jacuipense	8	(4)
2016	Confiança	14	(5)
2017	Campinense	14	(5)
2017–2018	Qadsia	?	(4)
2019	Maringá	11	(3)
2020	América de Natal	10	(10)
2020–2021	Fortaleza	8	(1)
2020	→ Ponte Preta (loan)	11	(2)
2021	→ Londrina (loan)	18	(0)
2021–2022	Al-Jabalain	15	(5)
2022	Gyeongnam FC	37	(19)
2023	Daejeon Hana Citizen	36	(17)
2024–	Jeonbuk Hyundai Motors	79	(22)
- * Club domestic league appearances and goals as of 3 August 2026

Tiago Pereira da Silva (born 28 October 1993), better known as Tiago Orobó, is a Brazilian professional footballer who plays as a forward for K League 1 club Jeonbuk Hyundai Motors.

== Professional career ==
Orobó joined the Araripina youth academy at age 16. Orobó made his professional debut with Araripina in a 1-0 Campeonato Pernambucano loss to Belo Jardim on 16 February 2012. He spent most of his early career with various semi-pro clubs in Brazil, before signing with Fortaleza in 2020. Prior to joining Fortaleza, he was in a fine goalscoring form at América de Natal and, previously, spent the latter part of 2019 unemployed and even having an informal job at a bakery. Before the suspension of all football matches in Brazil and worldwide due to the COVID-19 pandemic, he was the top goalscorer of 2020 in Brazil, all competitions counted.

On 17 August 2021, Orobó joined Saudi Arabian club Al-Jabalain. He was released on 13 January 2022.

On 27 December 2023, Orobó joined K League 1 side Jeonbuk Hyundai Motors on a permanent deal, following two seasons with fellow South Korean clubs Gyeongnam FC and Daejeon Hana Citizen.
