= Doo Hyeon-seok =

South Korean footballer (born 1995)

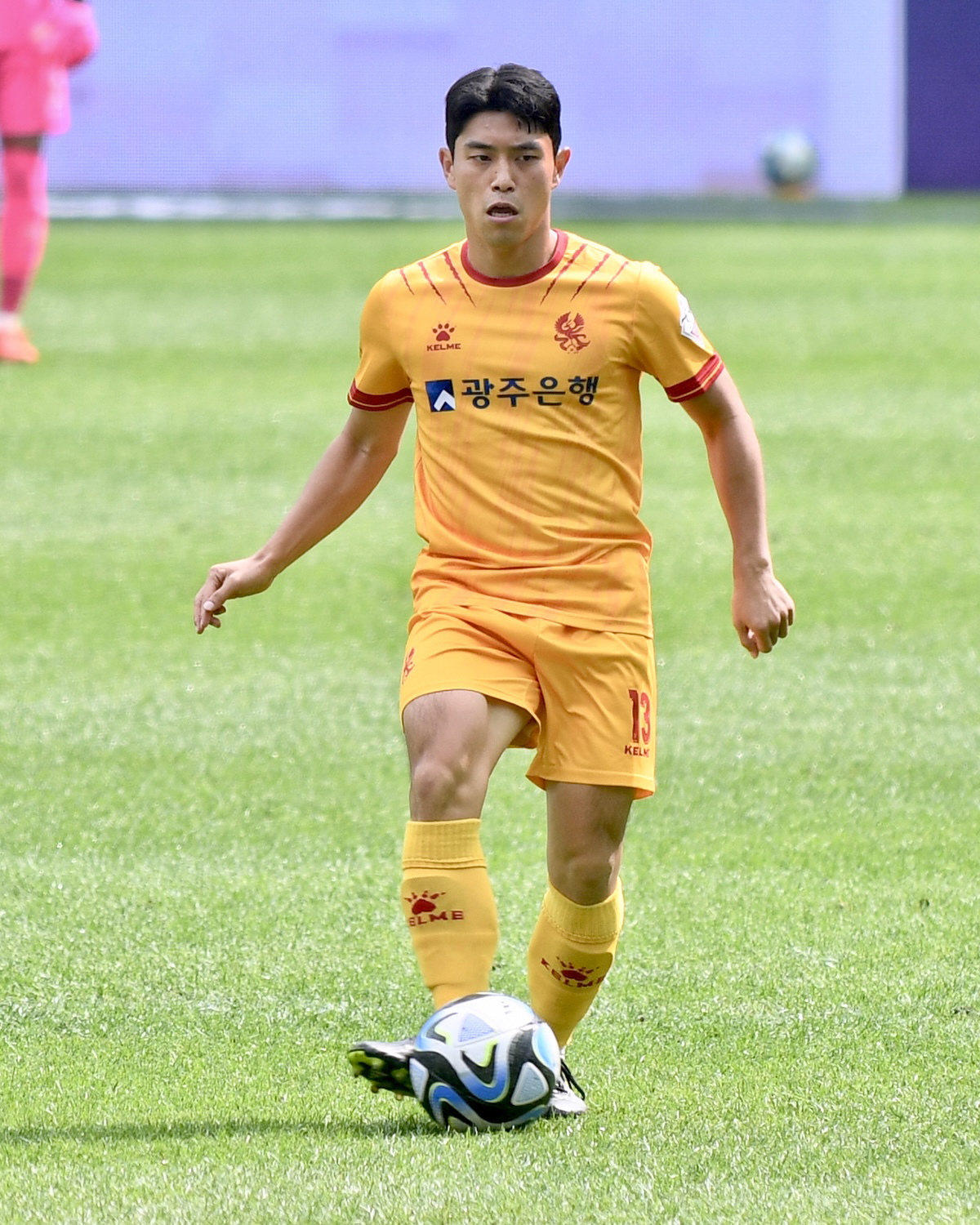
- Doo in 2023

Personal information
- Full name: Doo Hyeon-seok
- Date of birth: 21 December 1995 (age 30)
- Place of birth: South Korea
- Height: 1.69 m (5 ft 6 1/2 in)
- Position: Midfielder

Team information
- Current team: Gwangju FC
- Number: 13

Youth career
- 2014–2017: Yonsei University

Senior career*
Years	Team	Apps	(Gls)
2018–	Gwangju FC	153	(14)
- * Club domestic league appearances and goals as of 14 January 2021

Doo Hyeon-seok (Korean: 두현석; born 21 December 1995) is a South Korean footballer who plays as midfielder for Gwangju FC.

== Career ==
Doo joined K League 2 side Gwangju FC before 2018 season starts.
