= Daegu iM Bank Park =

Football stadium in Daegu, South Korea

- Forest Arena
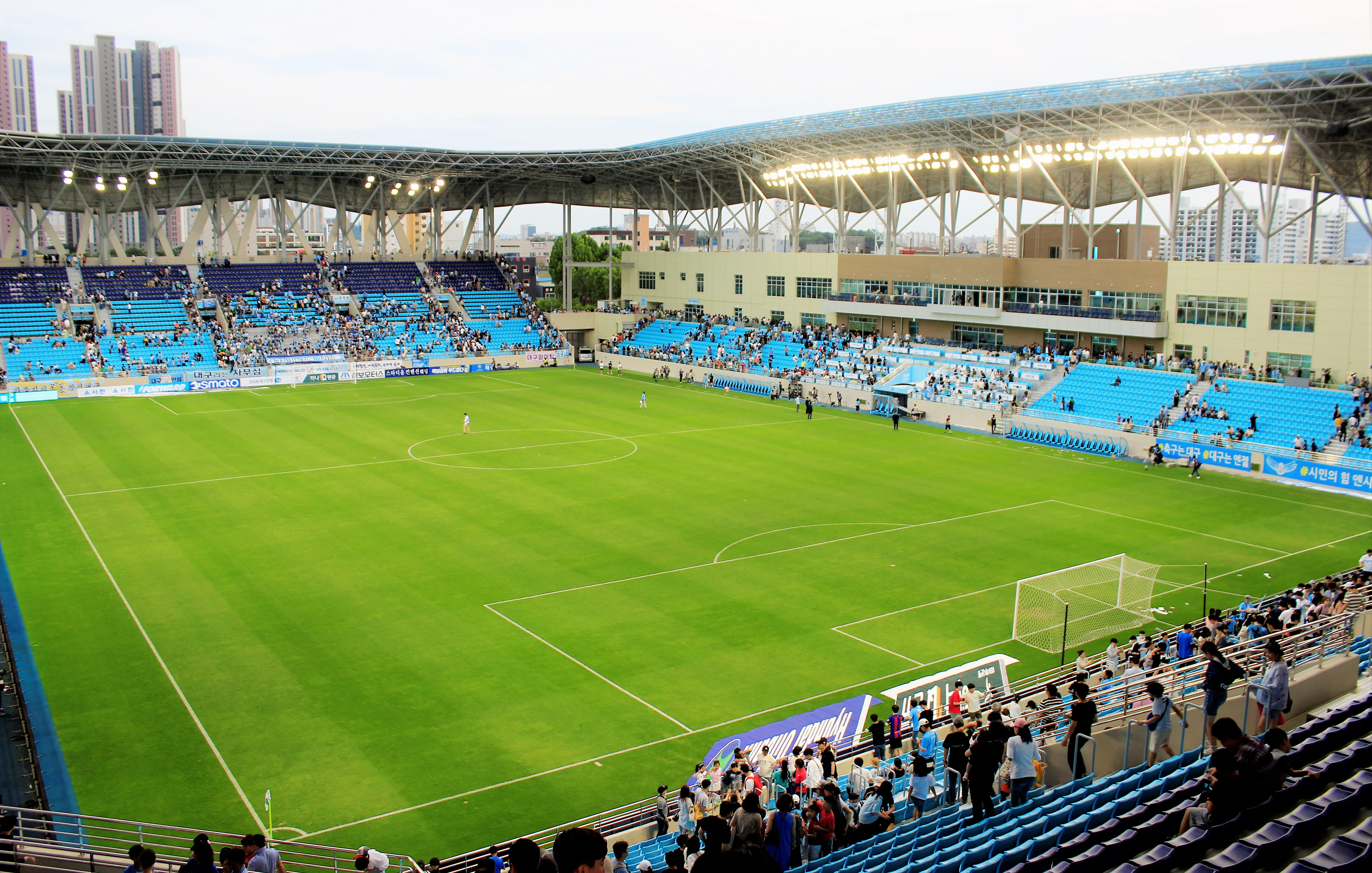
- Interactive map of Daegu iM Bank Park
- Former names: DGB Daegu Bank Park (2019–2025)
- Location: Buk District, Daegu, South Korea
- Coordinates: 35°52′53″N 128°35′18″E
- Owner: Daegu Metropolitan City Hall
- Operator: Daegu FC
- Capacity: 12,419
- Surface: Grass
- Field size: 117 by 83 metres (128 by 91 yards)

Construction
- Groundbreaking: 29 June 2017
- Built: 2017–2019
- Opened: 9 March 2019
- Cost: 51.5 billion won

Tenant
- Daegu FC (2019–present)

Daegu iM Bank Park (Korean: 대구iM뱅크파크), known as the Daegu Forest Arena (Korean: 대구포레스트아레나) in the Asian Football Confederation (AFC) international matches, is a football-specific stadium located in Daegu, South Korea, and is the home stadium of the K League 2 club Daegu FC. The stadium opened in March 2019 and has a seating capacity of 12,419 spectators.

== History ==
Exterior of the stadium

During the construction, the working name of the stadium was Daegu Forest Arena. DGB Financial Group bought the naming rights and named the stadium DGB Daegu Bank Park in February 2019, becoming the first stadium with naming rights in the K League history. However, this name cannot be used when hosting AFC events, since these governing bodies have policies forbidding corporate sponsorship from companies that are not official tournament partners. In AFC club matches, it is known as the Daegu Forest Arena.

In January 2025, the stadium name was changed to Daegu iM Bank Park.
