= Oh In-pyo =

South Korean footballer

Personal information
- Date of birth: 18 March 1997 (age 29)
- Place of birth: Anyang, Gyeonggi, South Korea
- Height: 1.77 m (5 ft 10 in)
- Position: Midfielder

Team information
- Current team: Seoul E-Land FC
- Number: 13

Youth career
- 2010–2012: Hyundai Middle School (Youth)
- 2013–2015: Hyundai High School (Youth)

College career
Years	Team	Apps	(Gls)
2016–2017	Sungkyunkwan University		

Senior career*
Years	Team	Apps	(Gls)
2018–2019	Ulsan Hyundai	0	(0)
2017–2019	→ Juniors OÖ (loan)	8	(0)
2017–2019	→ LASK Linz (loan)	3	(0)
2019–2022	Juniors OÖ	51	(1)
2019–2020	LASK Linz	0	(0)
2022–2023	Ulsan Hyundai	2	(0)
2023	→ Suwon FC (on loan)	32	(2)
2024–	Seoul E-Land FC	21	(2)
2024–2025	→ Gimcheon Sangmu FC (military)	17	(0)

International career^{‡}
2015–2017	South Korea U20	10	(1)
- * Club domestic league appearances and goals as of 5 August 2026 ‡ National team caps and goals as of 26 June 2018

- Oh In-pyo
- Hangul: 오인표
- RR: O Inpyo
- MR: O Inp'yo

Oh In-pyo (Korean: 오인표; born 18 March 1997) is a South Korean professional footballer who plays as a midfielder for Seoul E-Land FC.

== Club career ==
On 4 January 2022, Oh returned to Ulsan Hyundai.

On 16 January 2024, In-pyo joined Seoul E-Land FC of K League 2.

In April 2024, he joined Gimcheon Sangmu FC for his military service.
