= 2021 Suwon Samsung Bluewings season =

Suwon Samsung Bluewings
2021 season
- Chairman: Lee Jun
- Head Coach: Park Kun-ha
- Stadium: Suwon World Cup Stadium
- K League 1: 6th
- FA Cup: Quarter-finals
- Top goalscorer: League: Uroš Đerić; Kim Gun-hee; Jeong Sang-bin; Kim Min-woo (6 each); All: Uroš Đerić (7)
- Highest home attendance: 5,315 v Ulsan Hyundai; 28 November 2021
- Lowest home attendance: 1,680 v Jeju United; 12 May 2021
- Average home league attendance: 3,744
- Biggest win: 3–0 v Pohang Steelers (17 March 2021); 3–0 v Ulsan Hyundai (18 April 2021); 3–0 v FC Seoul (29 May 2021)
- Biggest defeat: 0–4 v Jeonbuk Hyundai Motors (30 October 2021)
Home colours	Away colours

The 2021 season was Suwon Samsung Bluewings' 26th season in K League 1 in South Korea. They competed in the 2021 K League 1 and the FA Cup.

== Kits ==
- Kit supplier: Puma
- Main sponsor: Samsung Neo QLED
- Rear sponsor: Deutsch Motors
- Sleeve partner: Galaxy S21 Series, Suwon City

Home	Away	Third

== Management team ==
Position	Name
Head coach	(South Korea) Park Kun-ha
Assistant head coach	(South Korea) Lee Kyung-soo
Assistant coach	(South Korea) Cho Jae-min
Goalkeeper coach	(South Korea) Kim Dae-hwan
Fitness coach	(South Korea) Kwon Bo-sung
Scout	(South Korea) Lee Jong-min

== Squad ==
=== Squad information ===
The age of the players is stated as of 1 March 2021.

Squad No.	Name	Nationality	Position(s)	Date of birth (age)
Goalkeepers
19	No Dong-geon	(South Korea)	GK	4 October 1991 (aged 29)
21	Yang Hyung-mo	(South Korea)	GK	16 July 1991 (aged 29)
31	Lee Sung-ju	(South Korea)	GK	3 April 1999 (aged 21)
34	Park Ji-min	(South Korea)	GK	25 May 2000 (aged 20)
99	An Chan-gi	(South Korea)	GK	6 April 1998 (aged 22)
Defenders
2	Choi Jung-won	(South Korea)	DF	16 August 1995 (aged 25)
3	Yang Sang-min	(South Korea)	DF	24 February 1984 (aged 37)
4	Doneil Henry	(Canada)	DF	20 April 1993 (aged 27)
5	Jo Sung-jin	(South Korea)	DF	14 December 1990 (aged 30)
8	Park Hyung-jin	(South Korea)	DF	24 June 1990 (aged 30)
15	Lee Pung-yeon	(South Korea)	DF	4 May 2000 (aged 20)
18	Kim Tae-hwan	(South Korea)	DF	25 March 2000 (aged 20)
20	Kim Sang-jun	(South Korea)	DF	1 October 2001 (aged 19)
23	Lee Ki-je	(South Korea)	DF	9 July 1991 (aged 29)
33	Park Dae-won	(South Korea)	DF	25 February 1998 (aged 23)
35	Jang Ho-ik	(South Korea)	DF	4 December 1993 (aged 27)
39	Min Sang-gi (VC)	(South Korea)	DF	27 August 1991 (aged 29)
42	Go Myeong-seok	(South Korea)	DF	27 September 1995 (aged 25)
66	Son Ho-jun	(South Korea)	DF	3 July 2002 (aged 18)
90	Goo Dae-young	(South Korea)	DF	9 May 1992 (aged 28)
Midfielders
6	Han Seok-jong	(South Korea)	MF	19 July 1992 (aged 28)
10	Kim Min-woo (C)	(South Korea)	MF	25 February 1990 (aged 31)
14	Kang Hyun-muk	(South Korea)	MF	28 March 2001 (aged 19)
16	Lee Kang-hee	(South Korea)	MF	24 August 2001 (aged 19)
17	Kang Tae-won	(South Korea)	MF	3 March 2000 (aged 20)
22	Kwon Chang-hoon	(South Korea)	MF	30 June 1994 (aged 26)
25	Choi Sung-keun	(South Korea)	MF	28 July 1991 (aged 29)
26	Yeom Ki-hun	(South Korea)	MF	30 March 1983 (aged 37)
Forwards
7	Jeon Se-jin	(South Korea)	FW	9 September 1999 (aged 21)
9	Kim Gun-hee	(South Korea)	FW	22 February 1995 (aged 26)
11	Han Seok-hee	(South Korea)	FW	16 May 1996 (aged 24)
12	Oh Hyeon-gyu	(South Korea)	FW	12 April 2001 (aged 19)
13	You Ju-an	(South Korea)	FW	1 October 1998 (aged 22)
27	Nicolao Dumitru	(Italy)	FW	12 October 1991 (aged 29)
29	Jeong Sang-bin	(South Korea)	FW	1 April 2002 (aged 18)
55	Uroš Đerić	(Serbia)	FW	28 May 1992 (aged 28)

Last updated: 27 November 2021.
Source: Suwon Samsung Bluewings

== Transfers ==
=== Released ===
Date	Position	Nationality	Name	To	Notes
6 November 2020	FW	(Bosnia and Herzegovina)	Sulejman Krpić	Free agent	
4 January 2021	MF	(South Korea)	Lim Sang-hyub	Free agent	
5 January 2021	DF	(South Korea)	Lee Yong-hyeok	Free agent	
6 January 2021	DF	(South Korea)	Han Eui-kwon	Free agent	
6 January 2021	MF	(South Korea)	Lee Yong-eon	Free agent	
6 January 2021	MF	(South Korea)	Shin Sang-whi	Free agent	
8 January 2021	MF	(South Korea)	Kim Joon-hyung	Free agent	
13 January 2021	GK	(South Korea)	Kim Da-sol	Free agent	
27 January 2021	MF	(South Korea)	Lee Sang-min	Free agent	
1 March 2021	GK	(South Korea)	Lee I-gi	Free agent	
19 July 2021	DF	(South Korea)	Choi Jeong-hoon	Free agent	

=== Loans out ===
Date	Position	Nationality	Name	To	Until	Ref.
6 January 2021	MF	(South Korea)	Lee Jong-sung	(South Korea) Seongnam FC	31 December 2021	
2 February 2021	FW	(South Korea)	Park Hee-Jun	(South Korea) Gimhae FC	7 September 2022	
8 March 2021	DF	(South Korea)	Myung Jun-jae	(South Korea) Gimcheon Sangmu	8 September 2022	
8 March 2021	FW	(South Korea)	Park Sang-hyeok	(South Korea) Gimcheon Sangmu	8 September 2022	
21 June 2021	MF	(South Korea)	Ko Seung-beom	(South Korea) Gimcheon Sangmu	21 December 2022	
16 July 2021	DF	(South Korea)	Yoon Seo-ho	(South Korea) Siheung Citizen	14 June 2023	

=== Transfers in ===
Date	Position	Nationality	Name	From	Fee	Ref.
11 January 2021	DF	(South Korea)	Choi Jung-won	(Japan) Fagiano Okayama	Free transfer	
20 January 2021	FW	(Italy)	Nicolao Dumitru	(Romania) Gaz Metan Mediaș	Undisclosed	
26 January 2021	FW	(Serbia)	Uroš Đerić	(South Korea) Gyeongnam FC	Undisclosed	
1 July 2021	FW	(South Korea)	Kwon Chang-hoon	(Germany) SC Freiburg	Free transfer	

=== Transfers out ===
Date	Position	Nationality	Name	To	Fee	Ref.
6 January 2021	MF	(South Korea)	Kim Jong-woo	(South Korea) Gwangju FC	Undisclosed	
9 January 2021	FW	(Australia)	Adam Taggart	(Japan) Cerezo Osaka	Undisclosed	
25 July 2021	MF	(Australia)	Terry Antonis	(Australia) Western Sydney Wanderers	Undisclosed	

== Friendlies ==
28 January 2021 Friendly	Suwon Samsung Bluewings	5–0	Kwangwoon University	Jeju
10:00 KST	Kim Gun-hee 1Q 8'; Kang Hyun-muk 2Q 28'; You Ju-an 2Q 38'; Son Ho-jun 3Q 9'; Jeong Sang-bin 3Q 18'; Suwon Samsung Bluewings		Kwangwoon University	Stadium: Ae Hyang Stadium

6 February 2021 Friendly	Suwon Samsung Bluewings	2–0	Gimhae FC	Geoje
KST	Kang Hyun-muk 50', 90+4'; Suwon Samsung Bluewings		Gimhae FC	Stadium: Geoje Sports Park; Referee: Park Byung-jin

11 February 2021 Friendly	Suwon Samsung Bluewings	2–0	Soongsil University	Geoje
KST	Jeong Sang-bin 4'; Choi Jung-won 54'

13 February 2021 Friendly	Suwon Samsung Bluewings	1–0	Jeonnam Dragons	Changwon
KST	Yeom Ki-hun 66'; Suwon Samsung Bluewings		Jeonnam Dragons	Stadium: Changwon Football Center Auxiliary 4th Stadium

16 February 2021 Friendly	Suwon Samsung Bluewings	2–1	Gimhae FC	Changwon
14:00 KST	Jeong Sang-bin 22'; Kang Tae-won 26'; Suwon Samsung Bluewings		?; Gimhae FC	Stadium: Changwon Football Center Auxiliary 2th Stadium

18 February 2021 Friendly	Suwon Samsung Bluewings	1–1	FC Anyang	Changwon
KST	Kim Min-woo 10'		Ha Seung-un 1'

24 February 2021 Friendly	Suwon Samsung Bluewings	3–0	Dangjin Citizen	Hwaseong
KST	Đerić 58'; You Ju-an 82'; Lee Kang-hee 90+3'			Stadium: Hwaseong Club House

28 June 2021 Friendly	Suwon Samsung Bluewings	?–?	Jeju International University	Namhae
KST	Suwon Samsung Bluewings		Jeju International University

== Competitions ==
=== Overview ===
Competition	First match	Last match	Starting round	Record							
Competition	First match	Last match	Starting round	Pld	W	D	L	GF	GA	GD	Win %
K League 1	28 February 2021	5 December 2021	Matchday 1	38	12	10	16	42	50	−8	31.58
FA Cup	14 April 2021	11 August 2021	Third round	3	1	1	1	2	3	−1	33.33
Total				41	13	11	17	44	53	−9	31.71

Last updated: 5 December 2021
Source: Soccerway

=== K League 1 ===
==== League table ====
Pos	Team	Pld	W	D	L	GF	GA	GD	Pts	Qualification or relegation (Note: Teams played each other three times (33 matches), before the league was split into two groups, the top six and the bottom six.)
4	Jeju United	38	13	15	10	52	44	+8	54	
5	Suwon FC	38	14	9	15	53	57	−4	51	
6	Suwon Samsung Bluewings	38	12	10	16	42	50	−8	46	
7	FC Seoul	38	12	11	15	46	46	0	47	
8	Incheon United	38	12	11	15	38	45	−7	47	

Source: K League
Rules for classification: 1) Points; 2) Goals scored; 3) Goal difference; 4) Wins; 5) Head-to-head points

==== Results summary ====
Overall								Home						Away					
Pld	W	D	L	GF	GA	GD	Pts	W	D	L	GF	GA	GD	W	D	L	GF	GA	GD
38	12	10	16	42	50	−8	46	5	6	8	21	29	−8	7	4	8	21	21	0

Last updated: 5 December 2021.
Source: kleague

==== Results by round ====
Matchday	1	2	3	4	5	6	7	8	9	10	11	12	13	14	15	16	17	18	19	20	21	22	23	24	25	26	27	28	29	30	31	32	33	34	35	36	37	38
Ground	H	H	A	H	A	H	H	A	A	H	A	A	H	A	H	A	H	A	A	H	H	A	H	H	A	H	A	H	A	H	H	A	A	H	A	A	H	A
Result	W	W	D	D	W	L	L	D	L	W	L	W	D	W	W	D	D	W	W	L	L	L	D	L	L	L	D	D	L	W	L	W	W	L	L	L	D	L
Position	4	3	3	3	3	4	4	4	6	3	5	4	5	4	3	3	3	3	3	3	3	4	3	3	5	6	7	6	6	5	6	6	6	6	6	6	6	6

Updated to match(es) played on 5 December 2021. Source: League Fixtures and Results
A = Away; H = Home; W = Win; D = Draw; L = Loss

==== Matches ====
All times are Korea Standard Time (KST) – UTC+9

28 February 2021 1	Suwon Samsung Bluewings	1–0	Gwangju FC	Suwon
16:30 KST	Kim Gun-hee 51'; Suwon Samsung Bluewings	Report	Lee Chan-dong (yellow card) 40'; Kim Won-sik (yellow card) 43'; Kim Hyo-gi (yellow card) 71'; Gwangju FC	Stadium: Suwon World Cup Stadium; Attendance: 3,258; Referee: Chae Sang-hyeop; Assistant referees: Lee Jung-min; Yang Jae-yong; Fourth official: Kim Jae-hong Video assistant referee: Kim Woo-sung Assistant video assistant referee: Cho Ji-um; Man of the Match: Kim Gun-hee (Suwon Samsung Bluewings)

7 March 2021 2	Suwon Samsung Bluewings	1–0	Seongnam FC	Suwon
14:00 KST	Kim Min-woo 41'; Suwon Samsung Bluewings	Report	Mulić (yellow card) 4'; Park Jeong-su (yellow card) 21' (yellow-red card) 38'; Lee Jong-sung (yellow card) 37'; Seongnam FC	Stadium: Suwon World Cup Stadium; Attendance: 3,087; Referee: Ko Hyung-jin; Assistant referees: Kim Gye-yong; Jang Jong-pil; Fourth official: Kim Dae-yong Video assistant referee: Kim Woo-sung Assistant video assistant referee: Lee Seul-gi; Man of the Match: Kim Min-woo (Suwon Samsung Bluewings)

10 March 2021 3	Suwon FC	0–0	Suwon Samsung Bluewings	Suwon
19:30 KST	Yun Young-sun (yellow card) 40'; Jeong Dong-ho (yellow card) 77'; Suwon FC	Report	Suwon Samsung Bluewings	Stadium: Suwon Stadium; Attendance: 1,104; Referee: Lee Dong-jun; Assistant referees: Lee Jung-min; Park Kyun-yong; Fourth official: Chae Sang-hyeop Video assistant referee: Kim Jong-hyeok Assistant video assistant referee: Kim Dong-in; Man of the Match: Yoo Hyun (Suwon FC)

14 March 2021 4	Suwon Samsung Bluewings	1–1	Gangwon FC	Suwon
16:30 KST	Đerić 33'; Kim Gun-hee (yellow card) 81'; Suwon Samsung Bluewings	Report	Silađi 10'; Han Kook-young (yellow card) 35'; Cho Jae-wan (yellow card) 64'; Yun Suk-young (yellow card) 90+2'; Gangwon FC	Stadium: Suwon World Cup Stadium; Attendance: 2,880; Referee: Park Byung-jin; Assistant referees: Seol Gui-sun; Park Sang-jun; Fourth official: Jeong Dong-sik Video assistant referee: Kim Dae-yong Assistant video assistant referee: Lee Seul-gi; Man of the Match: Uroš Đerić (Suwon Samsung Bluewings)

17 March 2021 5	Pohang Steelers	0–3	Suwon Samsung Bluewings	Pohang
19:00 KST	Song Min-kyu (yellow card) 90+2'; Pohang Steelers	Report	Kim Gun-hee 7'; Jang Ho-ik (yellow card) 19'; Jeong Sang-bin 38'; Lee Ki-je 52'; No Dong-geon (yellow card) 90+2'; Suwon Samsung Bluewings	Stadium: Pohang Steel Yard; Attendance: 1,839; Referee: Kim Dae-yong; Assistant referees: Kwak Seung-soon; Yang Jae-yong; Fourth official: Chae Sang-hyeop Video assistant referee: Kim Young-su Assistant video assistant referee: Park Jin-ho; Man of the Match: Kim Gun-hee (Suwon Samsung Bluewings)

21 March 2021 6	Suwon Samsung Bluewings	1–2	FC Seoul	Suwon
16:30 KST	Jeong Sang-bin 15'; Ko Seung-beom (yellow card) 48'; Suwon Samsung Bluewings	Report	Ki Sung-yueng 45+4'; Ko Kwang-min (yellow card) 72'; Park Jung-bin 80'; FC Seoul	Stadium: Suwon World Cup Stadium; Attendance: 3,311; Referee: Ko Hyung-jin; Assistant referees: Yoon Kwang-yeol; Park Kyun-yong; Fourth official: Choi Gwang-ho Video assistant referee: Kim Hee-gon Assistant video assistant referee: Lee Seul-gi; Man of the Match: Ki Sung-yueng (FC Seoul)

3 April 2021 7	Suwon Samsung Bluewings	1–3	Jeonbuk Hyundai Motors	Suwon
14:00 KST	Jang Ho-ik (yellow card) 20'; Yeom Ki-hun 90+5' (pen.); Suwon Samsung Bluewings	Report	Choi Bo-kyung 7'; Iljutcenko 38'; Barrow 52'; Jeonbuk Hyundai Motors	Stadium: Suwon World Cup Stadium; Attendance: 3,169; Referee: Kim Woo-sung; Assistant referees: Park Sang-jun; Jang Jong-pil; Fourth official: Kim Jae-hong Video assistant referee: Park Byung-jin Assistant video assistant referee: Park Jin-ho; Man of the Match: Choi Bo-kyung (Jeonbuk Hyundai Motors)

7 April 2021 8	Incheon United	0–0	Suwon Samsung Bluewings	Incheon
19:30 KST	Kim Do-hyuk (yellow card) 5'; Negueba (yellow card) 52'; Incheon United	Report	Kang Hyun-muk (yellow card) 55'; Suwon Samsung Bluewings	Stadium: Incheon Football Stadium; Attendance: 1,930; Referee: Kim Dong-jin; Assistant referees: Kim Gye-yong; Jang Jong-pil; Fourth official: Kim Young-su Video assistant referee: Song Min-seok Assistant video assistant referee: Choi Hyun-jai; Man of the Match: Kim Hyun (Incheon United)

11 April 2021 9	Jeju United	2–1	Suwon Samsung Bluewings	Seogwipo
16:00 KST	Jang Ho-ik 79' (o.g.); Joo Min-kyu 87'; Jeju United	Report	Choi Jung-won 13', (yellow card) 17'; Suwon Samsung Bluewings	Stadium: Jeju World Cup Stadium; Attendance: 2,366; Referee: Park Byung-jin; Assistant referees: Seol Gui-sun; Lee Jung-min; Fourth official: Chae Sang-hyeop Video assistant referee: Mae Ho-young Assistant video assistant referee: Choi Gyu-hyeon; Man of the Match: Joo Min-kyu (Jeju United)

18 April 2021 10	Suwon Samsung Bluewings	3–0	Ulsan Hyundai	Suwon
14:00 KST	Kim Gun-hee 14'; Kang Hyun-muk 47'; Kim Tae-hwan (yellow card) 49'; Jeong Sang-bin 70'; Park Dae-won (yellow card) 79'; Suwon Samsung Bluewings	Report	Kim Kee-hee (yellow card) 58'; Ulsan Hyundai	Stadium: Suwon World Cup Stadium; Attendance: 2,761; Referee: Kim Dae-yong; Assistant referees: Yoon Kwang-yeol; Park Kyun-yong; Fourth official: Ko Hyung-jin Video assistant referee: Kim Young-su Assistant video assistant referee: Kim Woo-sung; Man of the Match: Kim Gun-hee (Suwon Samsung Bluewings)

21 April 2021 11	Daegu FC	1–0	Suwon Samsung Bluewings	Daegu
19:30 KST	Kim Jae-woo (yellow card) 19'; Edgar 73' (pen.); Lee Yong-rae (yellow card) 75'; Serginho (yellow card) 90+7'; Daegu FC	Report	Park Dae-won (yellow card) 55'; Choi Sung-keun (red card) 68'; Jeong Sang-bin (yellow card) 83'; Lee Ki-je (yellow card) 90+4'; Min Sang-gi (yellow card) 90+4'; Suwon Samsung Bluewings	Stadium: DGB Daegu Bank Park; Attendance: 2,037; Referee: Kim Young-su; Assistant referees: Ji Seung-min; Kang Dong-ho; Fourth official: Choi Hyun-jai Video assistant referee: Mae Ho-young Assistant video assistant referee: Kim Kyoung-min; Man of the Match: Jeong Tae-wook (Daegu FC)

25 April 2021 12	Seongnam FC	0–1	Suwon Samsung Bluewings	Seongnam
19:00 KST	Lee Jong-sung (yellow card) 43'; Kang Jae-woo (yellow card) 45+2'; Richard (yellow card) 75'; Seongnam FC	Report	Ko Seung-beom (yellow card) 41'; Kim Tae-hwan (yellow card) 71'; Jeong Sang-bin (yellow card) 77'; Lee Ki-je 83'; Antonis (yellow card) 90+4'; Suwon Samsung Bluewings	Stadium: Tancheon Stadium; Attendance: 1,360; Referee: Kim Hee-gon; Assistant referees: Park Sang-jun; Sung Joo-kyung; Fourth official: Lee Dong-jun Video assistant referee: Kim Jong-hyeok Assistant video assistant referee: Choi Gyu-hyeon; Man of the Match: Lee Ki-je (Suwon Samsung Bluewings)

1 May 2021 13	Suwon Samsung Bluewings	1–1	Pohang Steelers	Suwon
16:30 KST	Antonis (yellow card) 45+3'; Kim Tae-hwan 88'; Goo Dae-young (yellow card) 90+4'; Suwon Samsung Bluewings	Report	Lim Sang-hyub 3'; Shin Kwang-hoon (yellow card) 27' (red card) 90+2'; Gwon Wan-gyu (yellow card) 90+4'; Pohang Steelers	Stadium: Suwon World Cup Stadium; Attendance: 3,045; Referee: Kim Dae-yong; Assistant referees: Lee Jung-min; Yang Jae-yong; Fourth official: Cho Ji-um Video assistant referee: Kim Jong-hyeok Assistant video assistant referee: Seo Dong-jin; Man of the Match: Kim Tae-hwan (Suwon Samsung Bluewings)

9 May 2021 14	Jeonbuk Hyundai Motors	1–3	Suwon Samsung Bluewings	Jeonju
16:30 KST	Iljutcenko (yellow card) 52', (goal) 90+1' (pen.); Jeonbuk Hyundai Motors	Report	Ko Seung-beom 63'; Jeong Sang-bin 66'; Lee Ki-je 72'; Jang Ho-ik (yellow card) 76'; Choi Sung-keun (yellow card) 87'; Park Dae-won (yellow card) 90'; Suwon Samsung Bluewings	Stadium: Jeonju World Cup Stadium; Attendance: 5,478; Referee: Kim Jong-hyeok; Assistant referees: Kwak Seung-soon; Park Kyun-yong; Fourth official: Choi Hyun-jai Video assistant referee: Kim Sung-ho Assistant video assistant referee: Choi Gyu-hyeon; Man of the Match: Jeong Sang-bin (Suwon Samsung Bluewings)

12 May 2021 15	Suwon Samsung Bluewings	3–2	Jeju United	Suwon
19:00 KST	Jang Ho-ik (yellow card) 21'; Kim Gun-hee 51'; Đerić 58' (pen.); Henry 86'; Ko Seung-beom (yellow card) 89'; Jeong Sang-bin (yellow card) 90+8'; Suwon Samsung Bluewings	Report	Joo Min-kyu 18', 45+3'; Hong Sung-wook (yellow card) 23'; Chung Woon (yellow card) 30'; Kim Young-uk (yellow card) 49' (yellow-red card) 80'; Jeju United	Stadium: Suwon World Cup Stadium; Attendance: 1,680; Referee: Lee Dong-jun; Assistant referees: Yoon Jae-yeol; Jang Jong-pil; Fourth official: Oh Hyun-jin Video assistant referee: Ko Hyung-jin Assistant video assistant referee: Kim Do-yeon; Man of the Match: Kim Gun-hee (Suwon Samsung Bluewings)

16 May 2021 16	Ulsan Hyundai	1–1	Suwon Samsung Bluewings	Ulsan
16:30 KST	Kim Tae-hwan (yellow card) 52'; Seol Young-woo 84'; Bulthuis (yellow card) 90+1'; Ulsan Hyundai	Report	Đerić 5'; Park Dae-won (yellow card) 17'; Henry (yellow card) 42'; Min Sang-gi (yellow card) 86'; Suwon Samsung Bluewings	Stadium: Ulsan Munsu Football Stadium; Attendance: 2,728; Referee: Park Byung-jin; Assistant referees: Park Sang-jun; Park Kyun-yong; Fourth official: Shin Yong-jun Video assistant referee: Ko Hyung-jin Assistant video assistant referee: Choi Gyu-hyeon; Man of the Match: Seol Young-woo (Ulsan Hyundai)

19 May 2021 17	Suwon Samsung Bluewings	1–1	Daegu FC	Suwon
19:00 KST	Choi Sung-keun (yellow card) 49'; Jang Ho-ik (yellow card) 59'; Kim Min-woo 73' (pen.); Suwon Samsung Bluewings	Report	Edgar (yellow card) 42'; Hong Jeong-woon 90+1'; Daegu FC	Stadium: Suwon World Cup Stadium; Attendance: 3,304; Referee: Kim Dae-yong; Assistant referees: Kwak Seung-soon; Jang Jong-pil; Fourth official: Jeong Dong-sik Video assistant referee: Song Min-seok Assistant video assistant referee: Park Jin-ho; Man of the Match: Cesinha (Daegu FC)

23 May 2021 18	Gwangju FC	3–4	Suwon Samsung Bluewings	Gwangju
16:30 KST	Han Hee-hoon 7'; Reis 58' (pen.); Lee Min-ki (yellow card) 78'; Kim Jong-woo 90+5' (pen.); Lee Han-do (yellow card) 90+6'; Gwangju FC	Report	Kim Min-woo 16'; Đerić 48' (pen.); Kim Tae-hwan (yellow card) 68'; Goo Dae-young (yellow card) 75'; Kim Gun-hee 84'; Henry (yellow card) 90+1'; Lee Ki-je 90+8'; Suwon Samsung Bluewings	Stadium: Gwangju Football Stadium; Attendance: 1,269; Referee: Lee Dong-jun; Assistant referees: Lee Jung-min; Sung Joo-kyung; Fourth official: Chae Sang-hyeop Video assistant referee: Kim Jong-hyeok Assistant video assistant referee: Lim Jung-soo; Man of the Match: Lee Ki-je (Suwon Samsung Bluewings)

29 May 2021 19	FC Seoul	0–3	Suwon Samsung Bluewings	Seoul
19:00 KST	Hwang Hyun-soo (yellow card) 38'; Kwon Sung-yun (yellow card) 65'; FC Seoul	Report	Kim Gun-hee 39' (pen.), (yellow card) 53'; Kim Min-woo 50'; Min Sang-gi 67'; Suwon Samsung Bluewings	Stadium: Seoul World Cup Stadium; Attendance: 4,976; Referee: Kim Jong-hyeok; Assistant referees: Kang Dong-ho; Park Kyun-yong; Fourth official: Cho Ji-um Video assistant referee: Kim Sung-ho Assistant video assistant referee: Kim Do-yeon; Man of the Match: Kim Gun-hee (Suwon Samsung Bluewings)

20 July 2021 20	Suwon Samsung Bluewings	1–2	Suwon FC	Suwon
19:30 KST	Han Seok-jong (yellow card) 34' (yellow-red card) 73'; Jang Ho-ik (yellow card) 66'; Kim Dong-woo 70' (o.g.); Jeong Sang-bin (yellow card) 74'; Suwon Samsung Bluewings	Report	Lars 82'; Lee Yeong-jae 89' (pen.); Suwon FC	Stadium: Suwon World Cup Stadium; Attendance: 0 Referee: Kim Woo-sung; Assistant referees: Kwak Seung-soon; Jang Jong-pil; Fourth official: Ahn Jae-hoon Video assistant referee: Kim Sung-ho Assistant video assistant referee: Park Jin-ho; Man of the Match: Lars (Suwon FC)

23 July 2021 21	Suwon Samsung Bluewings	1–2	Incheon United	Suwon
19:30 KST	Đerić 46' Suwon Samsung Bluewings	Report	Mugoša 59' (pen.), 88'; Jeong Hyuk (yellow card) 71'; Incheon United	Stadium: Suwon World Cup Stadium; Attendance: 0 Referee: Park Byung-jin; Assistant referees: Ji Seung-min; Sung Joo-kyung; Fourth official: Chae Sang-hyeop Video assistant referee: Ko Hyung-jin Assistant video assistant referee: Kim Do-yeon; Man of the Match: Stefan Mugoša (Incheon United)

1 August 2021 22	Gangwon FC	3–0	Suwon Samsung Bluewings	Chuncheon
20:00 KST	Rim Chang-woo (yellow card) 16'; Ko Moo-yeol 35', 78'; Song Jun-seok (yellow card) 40'; Yun Suk-young 52'; Gangwon FC	Report	Park Dae-won (yellow card) 40'; Jang Ho-ik (yellow card) 66'; Choi Sung-keun (yellow card) 70'; Suwon Samsung Bluewings	Stadium: Chuncheon Songam Sports Town; Attendance: 1,086; Referee: Lee Dong-jun; Assistant referees: Lee Jung-min; Yang Jae-yong; Fourth official: Song Min-seok Video assistant referee: Kim Dong-jin Assistant video assistant referee: Mae Ho-young; Man of the Match: Ko Moo-yeol (Gangwon FC)

7 August 2021 23	Suwon Samsung Bluewings	0–0	Jeju United	Suwon
20:00 KST	Han Seok-jong (yellow card) 70'; Suwon Samsung Bluewings	Report	Joo Min-kyu (yellow card) 36'; Jin Seong-uk (yellow card) 65'; Jeju United	Stadium: Suwon World Cup Stadium; Attendance: 0 Referee: Ko Hyung-jin; Assistant referees: Ji Seung-min; Seol Gui-sun; Fourth official: Kim Yong-woo Video assistant referee: Kim Sung-ho Assistant video assistant referee: Kim Do-yeon; Man of the Match: Min Sang-gi (Suwon Samsung Bluewings)

14 August 2021 25	Suwon Samsung Bluewings	1–2	Seongnam FC	Suwon
20:00 KST	Nicolao 57'; Henry (yellow card) 86'; Choi Sung-keun (yellow card) 90+1'; Suwon Samsung Bluewings	Report	Kang Jae-woo (yellow card) 18'; Richard 26'; Mulić 89'; Seongnam FC	Stadium: Suwon World Cup Stadium; Attendance: 0 Referee: Kim Dong-jin; Assistant referees: Yoon Jae-yeol; Sung Joo-kyung; Fourth official: Park Byung-jin Video assistant referee: Chae Sang-hyeop Assistant video assistant referee: Jung Hoe-soo; Man of the Match: Fejsal Mulić (Seongnam FC)

22 August 2021 26	Ulsan Hyundai	3–1	Suwon Samsung Bluewings	Ulsan
19:30 KST	Kim Tae-hwan (yellow card) 12'; Lee Chung-yong 39', 82'; Koh Myong-jin (yellow card) 64'; Lee Dong-jun 90+2'; Ulsan Hyundai	Report	Kim Min-woo 15' (pen.); Henry (yellow card) 83'; Lee Ki-je (yellow card) 88'; Suwon Samsung Bluewings	Stadium: Ulsan Munsu Football Stadium; Attendance: 3,155; Referee: Park Byung-jin; Assistant referees: Kwak Seung-soon; Yang Jae-yong; Fourth official: Shin Yong-jun Video assistant referee: Kim Jong-hyeok Assistant video assistant referee: Lim Jung-soo; Man of the Match: Lee Chung-yong (Ulsan Hyundai)
Note: The match was originally scheduled to begin at 20 o'clock, but it was 30 minutes earlier.

25 August 2021 27	Suwon Samsung Bluewings	0–3	Suwon FC	Suwon
20:00 KST	Jang Ho-ik (yellow card) 28' (yellow-red card) 51'; Kwon Chang-hoon (yellow card) 30'; Jeon Se-jin (yellow card) 90+2'; Suwon Samsung Bluewings	Report	Jackson 57', (yellow card) 82'; Lee Yeong-jae 80'; Kim Ju-yeop (yellow card) 90'; Yang Dong-hyen 90+3'; Suwon FC	Stadium: Suwon World Cup Stadium; Attendance: 0 Referee: Lee Dong-jun; Assistant referees: Park Sang-jun; Kang Dong-ho; Fourth official: Jung Hoe-soo Video assistant referee: Kim Dong-jin Assistant video assistant referee: Choi Gyu-hyeon; Man of the Match: Lee Yeong-jae (Suwon FC)

28 August 2021 28	Pohang Steelers	0–0	Suwon Samsung Bluewings	Pohang
18:00 KST	Park Seung-wook (yellow card) 14'; Shin Kwang-hoon (yellow card) 25'; Grant (yellow card) 59'; Lee Ho-jae (yellow card) 90+2'; Pohang Steelers	Report	Suwon Samsung Bluewings	Stadium: Pohang Steel Yard; Attendance: 1,894; Referee: Jung Hoe-soo; Assistant referees: Yoon Jae-yeol; Seol Gui-sun; Fourth official: Chae Sang-hyeop Video assistant referee: Kim Jong-hyeok Assistant video assistant referee: Lee Seul-gi; Man of the Match: Kang Hyeon-mu (Pohang Steelers)

11 September 2021 29	Suwon Samsung Bluewings	2–2	Gwangju FC	Suwon
19:00 KST	Min Sang-gi (yellow card) 4', (goal) 58'; Jeong Sang-bin (yellow card) 32', (goal) 41'; Suwon Samsung Bluewings	Report	Heo Yool (yellow card) 29', (goal) 50'; Kim Ju-gong 54'; Gwangju FC	Stadium: Suwon World Cup Stadium; Attendance: 0 Referee: Jeong Dong-sik; Assistant referees: Lee Jung-min; Lee Yang-woo; Fourth official: Song Min-seok Video assistant referee: Lee Dong-jun Assistant video assistant referee: Choi Gyu-hyeon; Man of the Match: Jeong Sang-bin (Suwon Samsung Bluewings)

18 September 2021 30	Jeonbuk Hyundai Motors	1–0	Suwon Samsung Bluewings	Jeonju
14:20 KST	Kim Min-hyeok (yellow card) 45+1'; Paik Seung-ho 50' (pen.); Choi Chul-soon (yellow card) 82'; Jeonbuk Hyundai Motors	Report	Suwon Samsung Bluewings	Stadium: Jeonju World Cup Stadium; Attendance: 3,837; Referee: Lee Dong-jun; Assistant referees: Kim Gye-yong; Park Kyun-yong; Fourth official: Seo Dong-jin Video assistant referee: Kim Sung-ho Assistant video assistant referee: Choi Dae-woo; Man of the Match: Moon Seon-min (Jeonbuk Hyundai Motors)
Note: The match was originally scheduled to begin at 14 o'clock, but the time was changed due to broadcasting.

21 September 2021 31	Suwon Samsung Bluewings	3–2	Gangwon FC	Suwon
14:00 KST	Goo Dae-young (yellow card) 11'; Han Seok-jong (yellow card) 31'; Jeong Sang-bin 37'; Jo Sung-jin (yellow card) 45'; Lee Ki-je 45+7'; Kim Young-bin 52' (o.g.); Henry (yellow card) 69'; Kim Min-woo (yellow card) 86'; Suwon Samsung Bluewings	Report	Tsvetanov (yellow card) 8'; Kim Dae-woo (yellow card) 29'; Ko Moo-yeol 45+3' (pen.); Cho Jae-wan 47', (yellow card) 90+4'; Kim Young-bin (yellow card) 63'; Gangwon FC	Stadium: Suwon World Cup Stadium; Attendance: 0 Referee: Song Min-seok; Assistant referees: Kwak Seung-soon; Song Bong-keun; Fourth official: Choi Hyun-jai Video assistant referee: Kim Jong-hyeok Assistant video assistant referee: Cho Ji-um; Man of the Match: Lee Ki-je (Suwon Samsung Bluewings)

26 September 2021 32	Suwon Samsung Bluewings	0–2	FC Seoul	Suwon
15:00 KST	Jang Ho-ik (yellow card) 84'; Kang Hyun-muk (yellow card) 76'; Suwon Samsung Bluewings	Report	Lee Han-beom (yellow card) 29'; Cho Young-wook 64'; Na Sang-ho 86' (pen.); Lee Tae-seok (yellow card) 88'; FC Seoul	Stadium: Suwon World Cup Stadium; Attendance: 0 Referee: Lee Dong-jun; Assistant referees: Park Sang-jun; Park Kyun-yong; Fourth official: Chae Sang-hyeop Video assistant referee: Kim Sung-ho Assistant video assistant referee: Choi Gyu-hyeon; Man of the Match: Cho Young-wook (FC Seoul)
Note: The match was originally scheduled to begin at 14 o'clock, but the time was changed due to broadcasting.

2 October 2021 33	Incheon United	0–1	Suwon Samsung Bluewings	Incheon
19:00 KST	Delbridge (yellow card) 24'; Gang Yoon-goo (yellow card) 30'; Kim Yeon-soo (yellow card) 76'; Negueba (yellow card) 84'; Incheon United	Report	Han Seok-jong (yellow card) 29'; Kwon Chang-hoon 54'; Yeom Ki-hun (yellow card) 88'; Suwon Samsung Bluewings	Stadium: Incheon Football Stadium; Attendance: 0 Referee: Ko Hyung-jin; Assistant referees: Yoon Jae-yeol; Seol Gui-sun; Fourth official: Seo Dong-jin Video assistant referee: Mae Ho-young Assistant video assistant referee: Kim Dong-in; Man of the Match: Kwon Chang-hoon (Suwon Samsung Bluewings)
Note: The match originally scheduled to be held at 15 o'clock on 3 October 2021, but the match schedule was changed due to the outbreak of COVID-19 in the K League.

24 October 2021 24	Daegu FC	0–2	Suwon Samsung Bluewings	Daegu
15:00 KST	Jeong Tae-wook (yellow card) 64'; Daegu FC	Report	Lee Ki-je (yellow card) 44'; Đerić 47'; Henry (yellow card) 59', (goal) 65'; Suwon Samsung Bluewings	Stadium: DGB Daegu Bank Park; Attendance: 3,108; Referee: Kim Dae-yong; Assistant referees: Ji Seung-min; Yang Jae-yong; Fourth official: Sung Duck-hyo Video assistant referee: Song Min-seok Assistant video assistant referee: Shin Yong-jun; Man of the Match: Henry (Suwon Samsung Bluewings)
Note: The match originally scheduled to be held on 10 August 2021, but was postponed due to the outbreak of COVID-19 in the K League.

30 October 2021 34	Suwon Samsung Bluewings	0–4	Jeonbuk Hyundai Motors	Suwon
16:30 KST	Jang Ho-ik (yellow card) 32'; Kim Tae-hwan (yellow card) 84'; Suwon Samsung Bluewings	Report	Kunimoto 11'; Kim Jin-su (yellow card) 27'; Kim Bo-kyung 67'; Iljutcenko 73' (pen.), 82'; Jeonbuk Hyundai Motors	Stadium: Suwon World Cup Stadium; Attendance: 2,208; Referee: Kim Dong-jin; Assistant referees: Kwak Seung-soon; Park Kyun-yong; Fourth official: Jung Hoe-soo Video assistant referee: Mae Ho-young Assistant video assistant referee: Cho Ji-um; Man of the Match: Takahiro Kunimoto (Jeonbuk Hyundai Motors)

6 November 2021 35	Jeju United	2–0	Suwon Samsung Bluewings	Seogwipo
14:00 KST	Joo Min-kyu 27' (pen.), 75'; Kim Kyung-jae (yellow card) 30'; Lee Jung-moon (yellow card) 90+4'; Jeju United	Report	Kim Min-woo (yellow card) 29'; Henry (yellow card) 53'; Jang Ho-ik (yellow card) 55'; Suwon Samsung Bluewings	Stadium: Jeju World Cup Stadium; Attendance: 1,633; Referee: Song Min-seok; Assistant referees: Jang Jong-pil; Kim Ji-wook; Fourth official: Seo Dong-jin Video assistant referee: Jeong Dong-sik Assistant video assistant referee: Kim Dong-in; Man of the Match: Joo Min-kyu (Jeju United)

21 November 2021 36	Daegu FC	2–1	Suwon Samsung Bluewings	Daegu
16:30 KST	Lee Keun-ho 20'; Kim Jin-hyuk (yellow card) 27'; Hong Jeong-woon (yellow card) 53'; Jo Jin-woo 75', (yellow card) 90+5'; Lamas (yellow card) 88'; Daegu FC	Report	Jeong Sang-bin (yellow card) 19'; Kim Min-woo 47'; Suwon Samsung Bluewings	Stadium: DGB Daegu Bank Park; Attendance: 4,562; Referee: Lee Dong-jun; Assistant referees: Yoon Jae-yeol; Ji Seung-min; Fourth official: Chae Sang-hyeop Video assistant referee: Kim Sung-ho Assistant video assistant referee: Choi Gyu-hyeon; Man of the Match: Jo Jin-woo (Daegu FC)

28 November 2021 37	Suwon Samsung Bluewings	0–0	Ulsan Hyundai	Suwon
14:40 KST	Choi Sung-keun (yellow card) 36'; Suwon Samsung Bluewings	Report	Kim Tae-hwan (yellow card) 25'; Lim Jong-eun (yellow card) 83'; Ulsan Hyundai	Stadium: Suwon World Cup Stadium; Attendance: 5,315; Referee: Park Byung-jin; Assistant referees: Park Sang-jun; Kang Dong-ho; Fourth official: Shin Yong-jun Video assistant referee: Kim Dong-jin Assistant video assistant referee: Cho Ji-um; Man of the Match: No Dong-geon (Suwon Samsung Bluewings)
Note: The match was originally scheduled to begin at 14 o'clock, but the time was changed due to broadcasting.

5 December 2021 38	Suwon FC	2–0	Suwon Samsung Bluewings	Suwon
15:00 KST	Kim Sang-won (yellow card) 10'; Lee Yeong-jae 41', (yellow card) 72'; Jung Jae-yong 55'; Suwon FC	Report	Suwon Samsung Bluewings	Stadium: Suwon World Cup Stadium; Attendance: 3,619; Referee: Kim Jong-hyeok; Assistant referees: Kwak Seung-soon; Sung Joo-kyung; Fourth official: Kim Young-su Video assistant referee: Shin Yong-jun Assistant video assistant referee: Sung Duck-hyo; Man of the Match: Lars (Suwon FC)

=== FA Cup ===
The draw for the first four rounds was held on 4 February 2021. The quarter-finals draw was made by Kim Byung-ji on Monday, 14 June.

14 April 2021 Third round	Daejeon Hana Citizen	1–2	Suwon Samsung Bluewings	Daejeon
19:00 KST	Baio 7'; Daejeon Hana Citizen		Đerić 2'; Choi Jung-won 66'; Goo Dae-young (yellow card) 86'; Suwon Samsung Bluewings	Stadium: Daejeon World Cup Stadium; Attendance: 1,043; Referee: Ko Hyung-jin; Assistant referees: Yoon Kwang-yeol; Sung Joo-kyung; Fourth official: Sung Duck-hyo

26 May 2021 Round of 16	Suwon Samsung Bluewings	0–0 (a.e.t.) (4–2 p)	FC Anyang	Suwon
19:00 KST	Han Seok-jong (yellow card) 43'; Suwon Samsung Bluewings		FC Anyang	Stadium: Suwon World Cup Stadium; Attendance: 1,871; Referee: Jung Hoe-soo; Assistant referees: Kwak Seung-soon; Jang Jong-pil; Fourth official: Park Jong-myeong
	Penalties
	Kang Hyun-muk (penalty scored); Antonis (penalty scored); Choi Jung-won (penalty scored); Jeong Sang-bin (penalty scored)		(penalty scored) Nilson Júnior; (penalty scored) Mo Jae-hyeon; (penalty missed) Tamura; (penalty missed) Ha Seung-un

11 August 2021 Quarter-finals	Gangwon FC	2–0	Suwon Samsung Bluewings	Chuncheon
19:00 KST	Ashurmatov (yellow card) 8'; Kim Dae-won 49', 90+1' (pen.); Silađi (yellow card) 69'; Kim Hyun-jun (yellow card) 87'; Gangwon FC		Jo Sung-jin (yellow card) 89'; Suwon Samsung Bluewings	Stadium: Chuncheon Songam Sports Town; Attendance: 748; Referee: Park Byung-jin; Assistant referees: Park Sang-jun; Kang Dong-ho; Fourth official: Chae Sang-hyeop
Note: The match was originally scheduled to be held on 18 August 2021, but the match schedule was changed due to the outbreak of COVID-19 in the K League.

== Statistics ==
=== Appearances ===
No.	Pos.	Player	K League 1		FA Cup		Total	
No.	Pos.	Player	Apps	Goals	Apps	Goals	Apps	Goals
Goalkeepers
19	GK	(South Korea) No Dong-geon	15	0	2	0	17	0
21	GK	(South Korea) Yang Hyung-mo	23	0	1	0	24	0
31	GK	(South Korea) Lee Sung-ju	0	0	0	0	0	0
34	GK	(South Korea) Park Ji-min	0	0	0	0	0	0
99	GK	(South Korea) An Chan-gi	0	0	0	0	0	0
Defenders
2	DF	(South Korea) Choi Jung-won	19	1	3	1	22	2
3	DF	(South Korea) Yang Sang-min	9	0	0	0	9	0
4	DF	(Canada) Doneil Henry	21	2	1	0	22	2
5	DF	(South Korea) Jo Sung-jin	6	0	3	0	9	0
8	DF	(South Korea) Park Hyung-jin	1	0	0	0	1	0
15	DF	(South Korea) Lee Pung-yeon	0	0	1	0	1	0
18	DF	(South Korea) Kim Tae-hwan	36	1	0	0	37	1
20	DF	(South Korea) Kim Sang-jun	3	0	2	0	5	0
23	DF	(South Korea) Lee Ki-je	38	5	0	0	38	5
33	DF	(South Korea) Park Dae-won	27	0	1	0	28	0
35	DF	(South Korea) Jang Ho-ik	34	0	1	0	35	0
39	DF	(South Korea) Min Sang-gi	30	2	1	0	31	2
42	DF	(South Korea) Go Myeong-seok	2	0	0	0	2	0
66	DF	(South Korea) Son Ho-jun	0	0	1	0	1	0
90	DF	(South Korea) Goo Dae-young	17	0	3	0	20	0
Midfielders
6	MF	(South Korea) Han Seok-jong	29	0	2	0	31	0
10	MF	(South Korea) Kim Min-woo	33	6	0	0	33	6
14	MF	(South Korea) Kang Hyun-muk	33	1	3	0	36	1
16	MF	(South Korea) Lee Kang-hee	0	0	2	0	2	0
17	MF	(South Korea) Kang Tae-won	0	0	2	0	2	0
22	MF	(South Korea) Kwon Chang-hoon	11	1	0	0	11	1
25	MF	(South Korea) Choi Sung-keun	21	0	0	0	21	0
26	MF	(South Korea) Yeom Ki-hun	27	1	3	0	30	1
Forwards
7	FW	(South Korea) Jeon Se-jin	10	0	1	0	11	0
9	FW	(South Korea) Kim Gun-hee	24	6	0	0	24	6
11	FW	(South Korea) Han Seok-hee	0	0	0	0	0	0
12	FW	(South Korea) Oh Hyeon-gyu	2	0	0	0	2	0
13	FW	(South Korea) You Ju-an	8	0	3	0	11	0
27	FW	(Italy) Nicolao Dumitru	17	1	2	0	19	1
29	MF	(South Korea) Jeong Sang-bin	28	6	1	0	29	6
55	FW	(Serbia) Uroš Đerić	27	6	2	1	29	7
Players who have been loaned out or left the club
7	MF	(South Korea) Ko Seung-beom	15	1	0	0	15	1
8	MF	(Australia) Terry Antonis	4	0	2	0	6	0
24	DF	(South Korea) Choi Jeong-hoon	0	0	0	0	0	0
44	DF	(South Korea) Yoon Seo-ho	0	0	0	0	0	0

Source: K League

=== Goal scorers ===
Rank	No.	Pos.	Player	K League 1	FA Cup	Total
1	55	FW	(Serbia) Uroš Đerić	6	1	7
2	9	FW	(South Korea) Kim Gun-hee	6	0	6
2	29	FW	(South Korea) Jeong Sang-bin	6	0	6
2	10	MF	(South Korea) Kim Min-woo	6	0	6
3	23	DF	(South Korea) Lee Ki-je	5	0	5
4	2	DF	(South Korea) Choi Jung-won	1	1	2
4	39	DF	(South Korea) Min Sang-gi	2	0	2
4	4	DF	(Canada) Doneil Henry	2	0	2
5	26	MF	(South Korea) Yeom Ki-hun	1	0	1
5	14	MF	(South Korea) Kang Hyun-muk	1	0	1
5	18	DF	(South Korea) Kim Tae-hwan	1	0	1
5	7	MF	(South Korea) Ko Seung-beom	1	0	1
5	27	FW	(Italy) Nicolao Dumitru	1	0	1
5	22	MF	(South Korea) Kwon Chang-hoon	1	0	1
Own goals				2	0	2
Total				42	2	44

Source: Soccerway

=== Assists ===
Rank	No.	Pos.	Player	K League 1	FA Cup	Total
1	18	DF	(South Korea) Kim Tae-hwan	5	0	5
1	23	DF	(South Korea) Lee Ki-je	5	0	5
2	7	MF	(South Korea) Ko Seung-beom	4	0	4
3	10	MF	(South Korea) Kim Min-woo	3	0	3
4	26	MF	(South Korea) Yeom Ki-hun	0	2	2
4	14	MF	(South Korea) Kang Hyun-muk	2	0	2
5	55	FW	(Serbia) Uroš Đerić	1	0	1
5	29	FW	(South Korea) Jeong Sang-bin	1	0	1
5	9	FW	(South Korea) Kim Gun-hee	1	0	1
5	6	MF	(South Korea) Han Seok-jong	1	0	1
5	13	FW	(South Korea) You Ju-an	1	0	1
Total				24	2	26

Source: Soccerway

=== Clean sheets ===
Rank	No.	Pos.	Player	K League 1	FA Cup	Total
1	21	GK	(South Korea) Yang Hyung-mo	8	0	8
2	19	GK	(South Korea) No Dong-geon	7	1	8
Total				15	1	16

Source: K League

=== Discipline ===
No.	Pos.	Player	K League 1			FA Cup			Total		
No.	Pos.	Player	Yellow card	(yellow card) (yellow-red card)	Red card	Yellow card	(yellow card) (yellow-red card)	Red card	Yellow card	(yellow card) (yellow-red card)	Red card
2	DF	(South Korea) Choi Jung-won	1	0	0	0	0	0	1	0	0
4	DF	(Canada) Doneil Henry	7	0	0	0	0	0	7	0	0
5	DF	(South Korea) Jo Sung-jin	1	0	0	1	0	0	2	0	0
6	MF	(South Korea) Han Seok-jong	3	1	0	1	0	0	4	1	0
7	MF	(South Korea) Ko Seung-beom	3	0	0	0	0	0	3	0	0
7	FW	(South Korea) Jeon Se-jin	1	0	0	0	0	0	1	0	0
8	MF	(Australia) Terry Antonis	2	0	0	0	0	0	2	0	0
9	FW	(South Korea) Kim Gun-hee	3	0	0	0	0	0	3	0	0
10	MF	(South Korea) Kim Min-woo	2	0	0	0	0	0	2	0	0
14	MF	(South Korea) Kang Hyun-muk	2	0	0	0	0	0	2	0	0
18	DF	(South Korea) Kim Tae-hwan	4	0	0	0	0	0	4	0	0
19	GK	(South Korea) No Dong-geon	1	0	0	0	0	0	1	0	0
22	MF	(South Korea) Kwon Chang-hoon	1	0	0	0	0	0	1	0	0
23	DF	(South Korea) Lee Ki-je	3	0	0	0	0	0	3	0	0
25	MF	(South Korea) Choi Sung-keun	5	0	1	0	0	0	5	0	1
26	MF	(South Korea) Yeom Ki-hun	1	0	0	0	0	0	1	0	0
29	FW	(South Korea) Jeong Sang-bin	6	0	0	0	0	0	6	0	0
33	DF	(South Korea) Park Dae-won	5	0	0	0	0	0	5	0	0
35	DF	(South Korea) Jang Ho-ik	10	1	0	0	0	0	10	1	0
39	DF	(South Korea) Min Sang-gi	3	0	0	0	0	0	3	0	0
90	DF	(South Korea) Goo Dae-young	3	0	0	1	0	0	4	0	0
Total			67	2	1	3	0	0	70	2	1

Source: Soccerway

== Awards ==
=== Manager ===
Manager	Award	Source
(South Korea) Park Kun-ha	Hyundai Oilbank's Kazen Manager of the Month (May)	
