= Kyung-jae =

- Hangul: 경재
- RR: Gyeongjae
- MR: Kyŏngjae

Kyung-jae, Gyeong-jae, and Kyoung-jae are various Latin-alphabet spellings of a single Korean given name.

People with this name include:

- Shōkei Arai (birth name Bak Gyeong-jae; 1948–1988), Japan's first naturalised legislator, who represented the former Tokyo 2nd District
- Lee Kyung-jae (born 1954), ethnic Korean community organiser in Japan
- Yun Gyeong-jae (born 1962), South Korean wrestler
- Myung Kyungjae (born 1968), South Korean biologist
- Kim Kyung-jae (c. 1978 – 2002), South Korean man who died from thrombosis after a prolonged video gaming session
- Eli Kim (born Kim Kyoungjae, 1991), member of South Korean boy band U-KISS
- Kim Kyung-jae (footballer) (born 1993), South Korean football defender

== See also ==
- List of Korean given names
