= Dae-won (name) =

- Hangul: 대원
- RR: Daewon
- MR: Taewŏn

Dae-won, also spelled Dai-won or Tae-won, is a Korean given name.

== People ==
- Daewon (born Moon Jae-hyeon, 1936), South Korean Zen master
- Dai-won Moon (born 1968), South Korean-born Mexican taekwondo master
- Kim C (born Kim Dae-won, 1971), South Korean singer
- Daewon Song (born 1975), American skateboarder
- Im Dae-won (born 1976), South Korean Greco-Roman wrestler
- Ha Dae-won (born 1985), South Korean football player
- Bae Dae-won (born 1988), South Korean football player
- Tochinowaka Michihiro (born Lee Dae-won, 1988), Japanese sumo wrestler
- Kim Dae-won (footballer, born 1992), South Korean football player
- Kim Dae-won (footballer, born 1997), South Korean football player
- Park Dae-won (born 1998), South Korean football player

== See also ==
- List of Korean given names
