= Kim Joon-hyung =

Kim Joon-hyung may refer to:

- Kim Joon-hyung (footballer)
- Kim Joon-hyung (professor)
