= Kim Dae-won =

Kim Dae-won may refer to:

- Kim Dae-won (footballer, born 1992)
- Kim Dae-won (footballer, born 1997)
