= Park Ji-min =

Park Ji-min may refer to:

- Jimin (born Park Ji-min, 1995), South Korean singer, dancer, and member of the boy band BTS
- Jamie (singer) (born Park Ji-min, 1997), South Korean singer and former member of the vocal duo 15&
- Park Ji-min (footballer) (born 2000), South Korean footballer
- Park Ji-min (actress), South Korean-born French actress and visual artist
