= Son Ho-jun (footballer) =

Korean association football player

Personal information
- Date of birth: 3 July 2002 (age 24)
- Place of birth: South Korea
- Height: 1.75 m (5 ft 9 in)
- Positions: Defender; forward

Team information
- Current team: Gyeongnam FC
- Number: 27

Youth career
- 2013–2014: Jinju Ko Bong-woo FC
- 2015–2016: Sancheong FC
- 2017–2021: Suwon Samsung Bluewings

Senior career*
Years	Team	Apps	(Gls)
2021–2025	Suwon Samsung Bluewings	16	(1)
2022	→ Jeonnam Dragons (loan)	13	(1)
2026–	Gyeongnam FC	19	(2)

International career
2018	South Korea U16	5	(0)
2019	South Korea U17	7	(0)
2019	South Korea U18	1	(0)
- * Club domestic league appearances and goals as of 6 August 2026

- Son Ho-jun
- Hangul: 손호준
- RR: Son Hojun
- MR: Son Hojun

Son Ho-jun (Korean: 손호준; born 3 July 2002) is a South Korean footballer who plays as a forward for K League 2 side Gyeongnam FC.

== Club career ==
Son signed a semi-professional contract with Suwon Samsung Bluewings in July 2020. For the 2022 season, he was loaned to K League 2 side Jeonnam Dragons.

== International career ==
In 2015, Son was called up to the South Korean under-13 side.

== Career statistics ==
=== Club ===
As of 6 August 2026.

Appearances and goals by club, season and competition
Club	Season	League			Cup		Continental		Other		Total	
Club	Season	Division	Apps	Goals	Apps	Goals	Apps	Goals	Apps	Goals	Apps	Goals
Suwon Samsung Bluewings	2021	K League 1	0	0	1 (Note: Appearances in the Korean FA Cup)	0	0	0	0	0	1	0
Suwon Samsung Bluewings	2022	K League 1	0	0	0	0	0	0	0	0	0	0
Suwon Samsung Bluewings	2023	K League 1	12	0	1	0	0	0	0	0	13	0
Suwon Samsung Bluewings	2024	K League 2	3	0	1	0	0	0	0	0	4	0
Suwon Samsung Bluewings	2025	K League 2	16	0	0	0	0	0	0	0	16	0
Suwon Samsung Bluewings	Total		16	0	2	0	0	0	0	0	18	0
Jeonnam Dragons (loan)	2022	K League 2	13	1	1	0	1 (Note: Appearances in the AFC Champions League)	0	0	0	15	1
Gyeongnam FC	2026	K League 2	19	2	0	0	0	0	0	0	19	2
Career total			48	3	3	0	1	0	0	0	52	3
