= No Dong-geon =

South Korean footballer

Noh Dong-geon
Personal information
- Date of birth: 4 October 1991 (age 35)
- Place of birth: South Korea
- Height: 1.91 m (6 ft 3 in)
- Position: Goalkeeper

Team information
- Current team: Chungbuk Cheongju
- Number: 1

Youth career
- 2010–2013: Korea University

Senior career*
Years	Team	Apps	(Gls)
2014–2022	Suwon Samsung Bluewings	120	(0)
2017	→ Pohang Steelers (loan)	13	(0)
2023–2024	Suwon FC	26	(0)
2025	Seoul E-Land	18	(0)
2026–	Chungbuk Cheongju	3	(0)

International career^{‡}
2009–2011	South Korea U20	14	(0)
2012–2014	South Korea U23	8	(0)
Medal record
Representing South Korea
Asian Games
Gold medal – first place	2014 Incheon	Team
- * Club domestic league appearances and goals as of 6 August 2026 ‡ National team caps and goals as of 2 August 2015

Noh Dong-geon (Korean: 노동건; born 4 October 1991) is a South Korean footballer who plays as a goalkeeper for the Chungbuk Cheongju.

== Career statistics ==
As of 2 December 2023

Club	Season	League			Cup		Continental		Other		Total	
Club	Season	Division	Apps	Goals	Apps	Goals	Apps	Goals	Apps	Goals	Apps	Goals
Suwon Samsung Bluewings	2014	K League 1	4	0	0	0	—		—		4	0
Suwon Samsung Bluewings	2015	K League 1	16	0	0	0	5	0	—		21	0
Suwon Samsung Bluewings	2016	K League 1	22	0	1	0	6	0	—		29	0
Suwon Samsung Bluewings	2018	K League 1	21	0	2	0	4	0	—		27	0
Suwon Samsung Bluewings	2019	K League 1	29	0	6	0	—		—		35	0
Suwon Samsung Bluewings	2020	K League 1	11	0	2	0	2	0	—		15	0
Suwon Samsung Bluewings	2021	K League 1	15	0	2	0	—		—		17	0
Suwon Samsung Bluewings	2022	K League 1	2	0	0	0	—		0	0	2	0
Suwon Samsung Bluewings	Total		120	0	13	0	17	0	0	0	150	0
Pohang Steelers (loan)	2017	K League 1	13	0	0	0	—		—		13	0
Suwon FC	2023	K League 1	23	0	0	0	—		2	0	25	0
Career total			156	0	13	0	17	0	2	0	188	0
