= Kim Kyung-jae =

South Korean gamer (1978–2002)

Kim Kyung-jae (c. 1978 – 2002) was the first human being to die from playing video games too much. He died of deep-vein thrombosis (DVT) after playing the Webzen video game Mu for 86 hours in Gwangju, with pauses only to purchase cigarettes and to use the bathroom. No medical report is available in English. Prolonged immobility as well as vein condition are diatheses that increase the odds of contracting deep vein thrombosis.

== Life ==
Kim Kyung-jae was born in 1978 in Gwangju, South Korea. He died in 2002 in Seoul, South Korea.
