= Han Seok-jong =

South Korean footballer (born 1992)

Personal information
- Full name: Han Seok-jong
- Date of birth: 19 July 1992 (age 34)
- Place of birth: South Korea
- Height: 1.86 m (6 ft 1 in)
- Position: Midfielder

Team information
- Current team: Gyeongnam FC
- Number: 63

Youth career
- Soongsil University

Senior career*
Years	Team	Apps	(Gls)
2014–2016	Gangwon FC	80	(5)
2017–2018	Incheon United FC	63	(4)
2019–2020	→ Sangju Sangmu (army)	28	(0)
2020–2023	Suwon Samsung Bluewings	65	(1)
2024	Seongnam FC	20	(0)
2025–	Gyeongnam FC	17	(0)
- * Club domestic league appearances and goals as of 7 January 2026

Han Seok-jong (Korean: 한석종; born 19 July 1992) is a South Korean footballer who plays as midfielder for Gyeongnam FC.

== Career ==
He signed with Gangwon FC on 13 December 2013.

In 2017, he joined Incheon United FC.
