= An Chan-gi =

South Korean footballer (born 1998)

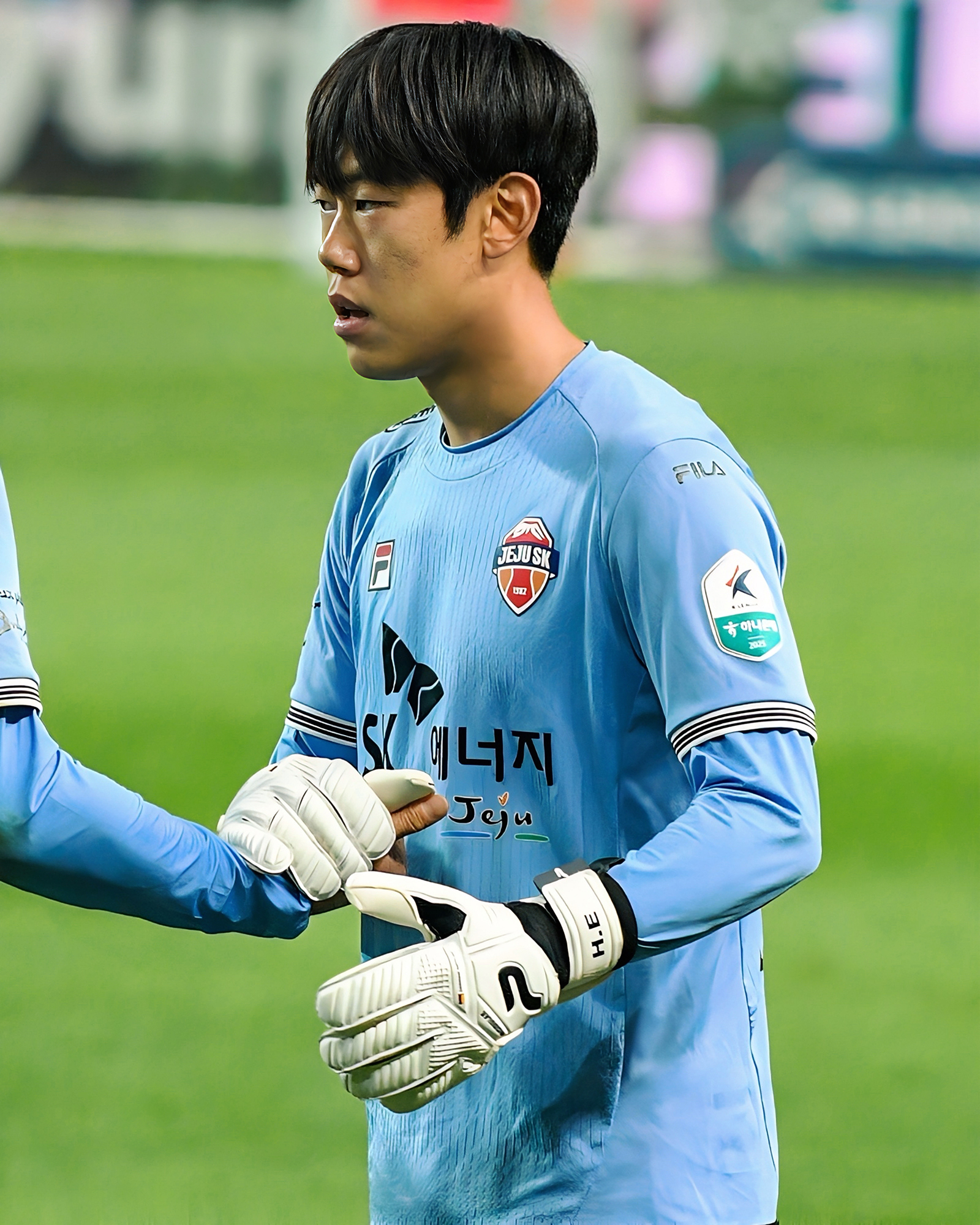
- An in 2025

Personal information
- Date of birth: April 6, 1998 (age 28)
- Place of birth: South Korea
- Height: 1.87 m (6 ft 2 in)
- Position: Goalkeeper

Team information
- Current team: Jeju SK FC
- Number: 21

Youth career
- 2014–2016: Maetan High School
- 2017–2019: Incheon National University

Senior career*
| Years | Team | Apps | (Gls) |
| 2020–2023 | Suwon Samsung Bluewings | 3 | (0) |
| 2022 | → Cheongju FC (loan) | 12 | (0) |
| 2024– | Jeju SK FC | 16 | (0) |

International career
| 2016 | South Korea U20 | 1 | (0) |
| 2019–2021 | South Korea U23 | 4 (Note: Includes one appearance against another KFA team.) | (0) |
| 2023– | South Korea | 0 | (0) |
Korean name
| Hangul | 안찬기 |
| RR | An Changi |
| MR | An Ch'an'gi |
- * Club domestic league appearances and goals as of 5 January 2026

An Chan-gi (Korean: 안찬기; born April 6, 1998) is a South Korean footballer who plays as a goalkeeper for K League 1 side Jeju SK FC. He competed at the 2020 Summer Olympics.
