= Lee Sung-ju =

North Korean activist (born 1991)

- Born: 1991 (age 34–35); Pyongyang, North Korea
- Other name: Kim Sung-joo
- Education: Sogang University
- Alma mater: University of Warwick
- Occupations: Author; advocate; writer; human rights activist
- Years active: 2023–present

Lee Sung-ju (Korean: 이성주) is a North Korean defector, human rights advocate, and author. He is best known for his 2016 memoir, Every Falling Star: The True Story of How I Survived and Escaped North Korea, which chronicles his transition from a privileged childhood in Pyongyang to becoming a homeless gang leader during the North Korean famine.

== Early life ==
He was born in Pyongyang to a high-ranking military officer, Lee spent his early childhood in relative luxury, living in a three-bedroom apartment with a refrigerator and a baby grand piano. In 1994, following the death of Kim Il-sung, Lee's father fell out of political favor after expressing skepticism about the regime's future. The family was subsequently stripped of their status and exiled to Gyeong-seong, an impoverished rural area in the northeast.

== Survival and gang life ==
During the Arduous March (the North Korean famine of the late 1990s), Lee's parents separately disappeared in search of food. At age 12, Lee became a kotjebi (homeless child) and formed a street gang with six other boys to survive. Using his Taekwondo training, he led the group in thievery and fighting for survival across various towns for four years, during which time he witnessed public executions and lost close friends to violence and starvation.

== Defection and education ==
In 2002, Lee was located by a broker sent by his father, who had successfully defected to South Korea. Lee escaped across the Tumen River into China and eventually reached South Korea using a fake passport. In South Korea, Lee attended Sogang University, earning a bachelor's degree in Political Science and Journalism. He later moved to the United Kingdom, where he became the first North Korean defector to study at the University of Warwick and pursued a PhD focused on Korean reunification.

Lee works as an activist with the Citizens' Alliance for North Korean Human Rights (NKHR), focusing on the protection of North Korean women and children in China. His life story is chronicled in the memoir Every Falling Star: The True Story of How I Survived and Escaped North Korea, co-authored with Susan Elizabeth McClelland and published in 2016.

Lee continues his advocacy work and maintains a prominent role in international discourse regarding the North Korean regime. He remains hopeful for a future reunification that would allow him to search for his mother, who is still missing.

== Advocacy ==
Lee is a consultant for the Citizens' Alliance for North Korean Human Rights (NKHR) and a frequent international speaker on North Korean political and social issues. In 2018, he received the Democracy Award from the National Endowment for Democracy (NED).

== Awards and honours ==
- In 2018, he received the Democracy Award from the National Endowment for Democracy (NED).
