= Jang Ho-ik =

South Korean footballer (born 1993)

Personal information
- Full name: Jang Ho-ik
- Date of birth: 4 December 1993 (age 32)
- Place of birth: South Korea
- Height: 1.73 m (5 ft 8 in)
- Position: Defender

Team information
- Current team: Busan IPark
- Number: 77

Youth career
- 2012-2015: Honam University

Senior career*
Years	Team	Apps	(Gls)
2016–2024	Suwon Samsung Bluewings	172	(0)
2019	→ Sangju Sangmu (loan)	0	(0)
2025–	Busan IPark	55	(1)
- * Club domestic league appearances and goals as of 5 August 2026

Jang Ho-ik (Korean: 장호익; born 4 December 1993) is a South Korean professional footballer who plays as a defender for K League 2 side Busan IPark.

== Club career ==
Jang joined Suwon Samsung Bluewings in 2016.

== Career statistics ==
=== Clubs ===
Appearances and goals by club, season and competition
Club performance			League		National cup		Continental		Total	
Season	Club	League	Apps	Goals	Apps	Goals	Apps	Goals	Apps	Goals
South Korea			League		KFA Cup		Asia		Total	
2016	Suwon Samsung Bluewings	K League 1	16	0	6	0	—		22	0
2017	Suwon Samsung Bluewings	K League 1	19	0	3	0	3	0	25	0
2018	Suwon Samsung Bluewings	K League 1	24	0	1	0	7	0	32	0
2019	Sangju Samgmu	K League 1	0	0	1	0	—		1	0
2020	Suwon Samsung Bluewings	K League 1	18	0	1	0	5	0	24	0
Career total			77	0	12	0	15	0	104	0
