= Jo Jin-woo =

South Korean footballer (born 1999)

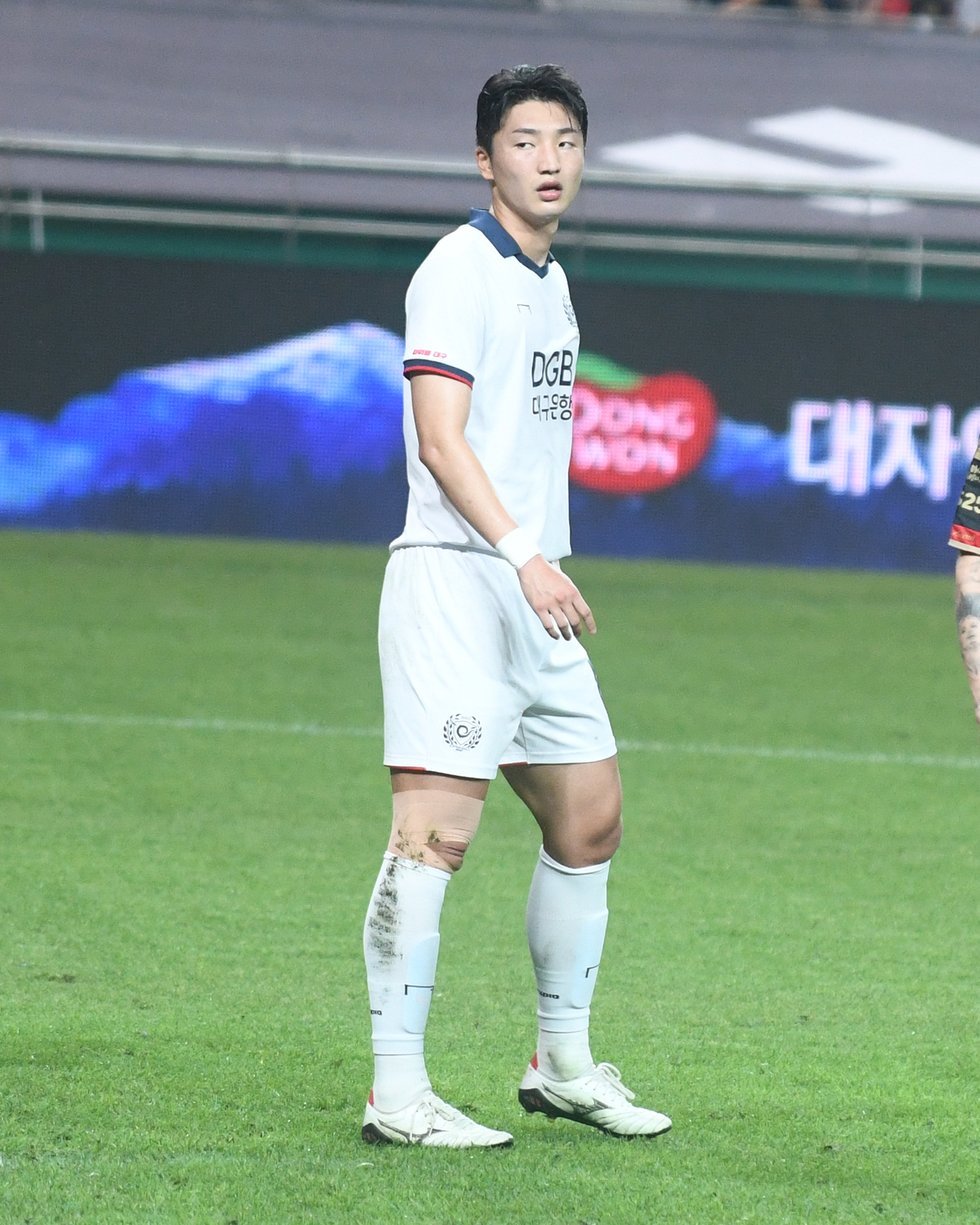
- Jo in 2023

Personal information
- Full name: Jo Jin-woo
- Date of birth: 17 November 1999 (age 26)
- Place of birth: Incheon, South Korea
- Height: 1.89 m (6 ft 2 in)
- Position: Defender

Team information
- Current team: Suwon FC
- Number: 16

Youth career
- 2015–2017: Incheon Nam High School

Senior career*
Years	Team	Apps	(Gls)
2018–2019	Matsumoto Yamaga	0	(0)
2020–2025	Daegu FC	100	(3)
2024–2025	→ Gimcheon Sangmu (draft)	2	(0)
2026–	Suwon FC	8	(1)

International career
2018	South Korea U20	5	(0)
2021	South Korea U23	1	(0)
- * Club domestic league appearances and goals as of 5 August 2026

- Jo Jin-woo
- Hangul: 조진우
- Hanja: 趙珍友
- RR: Jo Jinu
- MR: Cho Chinu

Jo Jin-woo (Korean: 조진우; born 17 November 1999) is a South Korean footballer who plays as a defender for Suwon FC.

== Early life ==
Jo was born in Incheon. He studied at Incheon Nam High School.

== Career ==
Jo started his career with Matsumoto Yamaga, but struggled to break into the first team, being named on the bench twice in matches in the J-League Cup. Jo moved to Daegu in 2020, and made his debut in a 2–1 win against Seongnam on 7 June 2020, coming off in the 83rd minute for Kim Dong-jin. He finished the season on 19 appearances.

Jo scored his first goal for Daegu in a 2–1 win on 21 November 2021, scoring the winning goal in the 75th minute.

== International career ==
Jo has international caps at youth level for South Korea.

== Career statistics ==
=== Club ===
As of 20 February 2022

Appearances and goals by club, season and competition
Club	Season	League			National cup		Other		Total	
Club	Season	Division	Apps	Goals	Apps	Goals	Apps	Goals	Apps	Goals
Matsumoto Yamaga	2018	J2 League	0	0	0	0	0	0	0	0
Matsumoto Yamaga	2019	J1 League	0	0	0	0	0	0	0	0
Matsumoto Yamaga	Total		0	0	0	0	0	0	0	0
Daegu FC	2020	K League 1	19	0	2	0	0	0	21	0
Daegu FC	2021	K League 1	16	1	3	0	6 (Note: Appearances in AFC Champions League)	0	25	1
Daegu FC	2022	K League 1	0	0	0	0	0	0	0	0
Daegu FC	Total		35	1	5	0	6	0	46	1
Career total			35	1	5	0	6	0	46	1
