= Jo Sung-jin =

South Korean footballer (born 1990)

Personal information
- Date of birth: 14 December 1990 (age 35)
- Place of birth: Daejeon, South Korea
- Height: 1.86 m (6 ft 1 in)
- Position: Defender

Youth career
- 2006–2008: Yuseong Life Science High School

Senior career*
Years	Team	Apps	(Gls)
2009–2011	Roasso Kumamoto	53	(1)
2012	Kamatamare Sanuki	33	(2)
2013	Consadole Sapporo	37	(1)
2014–2021	Suwon Samsung Bluewings	128	(3)
- * Club domestic league appearances and goals

- Jo Sung-jin
- Hangul: 조성진
- Hanja: 趙成鎭
- RR: Jo Seongjin
- MR: Cho Sŏngjin

Jo Sung-jin (Korean: 조성진; born 14 December 1990) is a South Korean football defender.

== Career ==
After graduating from Yuseong Bio Science Technology High School, he joined Roasso Kumamoto on 25 March 2009. He scored his first goal with Shonan Bellmare on 3 June 2009.
