= Kim Gyeong-jae =

South Korean footballer (born 1993)

Personal information
- Date of birth: 24 July 1993 (age 33)
- Place of birth: South Korea
- Height: 1.83 m (6 ft 0 in)
- Position: Defender

Team information
- Current team: Jeonnam Dragons
- Number: 23

Youth career
- 2009–2011: Yuseong Bio Science Technology High School
- 2012–2015: Ajou University

Senior career*
Years	Team	Apps	(Gls)
2016–2019	Jeonnam Dragons	17	(0)
2018–2019	→ Sangju Sangmu (army)	38	(0)
2020–2022	Jeju United	45	(1)
2023–2024	Gwangju FC	13	(0)
2025–	Jeonnam Dragons	23	(0)
Korean name
Hangul	김경재
Hanja	金徑栽
RR	Gim Gyeongjae
MR	Kim Kyŏngjae
- * Club domestic league appearances and goals as of 8 August 2026

Kim Gyeong-jae (Korean: 김경재; born 24 July 1993) is a South Korean footballer who plays for Jeonnam Dragons.
