= Lee Min-ki (footballer) =

South Korean footballer (born 1993)

Personal information
- Full name: Lee Min-ki
- Date of birth: 19 May 1993 (age 33)
- Place of birth: Seoul, South Korea
- Height: 1.75 m (5 ft 9 in)
- Position: Left-back

Team information
- Current team: Gwangju FC
- Number: 3

Youth career
- 2004–2005: Seoul Shinyongsan Elementary School
- 2006–2008: Yonggang Middle School
- 2009–2011: Yeouido High School

College career
Years	Team	Apps	(Gls)
2012–2015	Jeonju University		

Senior career*
Years	Team	Apps	(Gls)
2016–	Gwangju FC	155	(4)
2018–2019	→ Sangju Sangmu (army)	17	(0)
- * Club domestic league appearances and goals as of 4 August 2026

Lee Min-ki (Korean: 이민기; born 19 May 1993) is a South Korean professional footballer who plays as a left-back for Gwangju FC in the K League 1.
