= Goo Dae-young =

South Korean footballer (born 1992)

Personal information
- Full name: Goo Dae-young
- Date of birth: 9 May 1992 (age 34)
- Place of birth: South Korea
- Height: 1.77 m (5 ft 9 1/2 in)
- Position: Full-back

Team information
- Current team: Cheonan City FC
- Number: 90

Youth career
- 2011–2013: Hongik University

Senior career*
Years	Team	Apps	(Gls)
2014–2019	FC Anyang	85	(0)
2017–2019	→ Asan Mugunghwa (army)	24	(1)
2019–2022	Suwon Samsung Bluewings	52	(2)
2022-2023	FC Anyang	27	(0)
2024-	Cheonan City FC	31	(0)
- * Club domestic league appearances and goals as of 7 January 2026

Goo Dae-young (Korean: 구대영; born 9 May 1992) is a South Korean footballer who plays as full-back for Cheonan City FC in K League 2.

== Career ==
Goo joined K League Challenge side FC Anyang before the 2014 season starts.

== Career statistics ==
=== Club ===
Club performance			League		Cup		Continental		Other		Total	
Season	Club	League	Apps	Goals	Apps	Goals	Apps	Goals	Apps	Goals	Apps	Goals
South Korea			League		KFA Cup		Asia		Other		Total	
2014	FC Anyang	K League 2	14	0	2	0	-		-		16	0
2015	FC Anyang	K League 2	34	0	1	0	-		-		35	0
2016	FC Anyang	K League 2	27	0	2	0	-		-		29	0
2017	FC Anyang	K League 2	10	0	1	0	-		-		11	0
2017	Asan Mugunghwa	K League 2	10	0	0	0	-		1	0	11	0
2018	Asan Mugunghwa	K League 2	14	1	2	0	-		-		16	1
2019	Suwon Samsung Bluewings	K League 1	18	2	4	0	-		-		22	2
2020	Suwon Samsung Bluewings	K League 1	9	0	2	0	2	0	-		13	0
Total	South Korea		136	3	14	0	2	0	1	0	153	3
Career total			136	3	14	0	2	0	1	0	153	3
