= Choi Sung-keun =

South Korean footballer

Personal information
- Full name: Choi Sung-keun
- Date of birth: 28 July 1991 (age 35)
- Place of birth: South Korea
- Height: 1.81 m (5 ft 11 in)
- Position: Midfielder

Team information
- Current team: Chungbuk Cheongju
- Number: 25

Youth career
- Korea University

Senior career*
| Years | Team | Apps | (Gls) |
| 2012–2014 | Ventforet Kofu | 10 | (0) |
| 2014–2017 | Sagan Tosu | 40 | (0) |
| 2016 | → FC Gifu (loan) | 9 | (0) |
| 2017–2024 | Suwon Samsung Bluewings | 105 | (2) |
| 2025– | Chungbuk Cheongju | 7 | (0) |

International career
| 2009–2011 | South Korea U-20 | 23 | (0) |
| 2009–2013 | South Korea U-23 | 13 | (0) |
Medal record
Representing South Korea
Men's football
Asian Games
| Gold medal – first place | 2014 Incheon | Team |
- * Club domestic league appearances and goals as of 7 January 2026

Choi Sung-keun (Korean: 최성근; born 28 July 1991) is a South Korean footballer, who plays as a midfielder for Chungbuk Cheongju.

== Career statistics ==
As of 2 April 2023.

| Club | Season | League | | | Cup | | League Cup | | Continental | | Other | | Total | |
| Club | Season | Division | Apps | Goals | Apps | Goals | Apps | Goals | Apps | Goals | Apps | Goals | Apps | Goals |
|---|---|---|---|---|---|---|---|---|---|---|---|---|---|---|
| Ventforet Kofu | 2012 | J2 League | 9 | 0 | 0 | 0 | — | | — | | — | | 9 | 0 |
| Ventforet Kofu | 2013 | J1 League | 1 | 0 | 3 | 0 | 4 | 0 | — | | — | | 8 | 0 |
| Ventforet Kofu | Total | | 10 | 0 | 3 | 0 | 4 | 0 | — | | — | | 17 | 0 |
| Sagan Tosu | 2014 | J1 League | 7 | 0 | 1 | 0 | 4 | 0 | — | | — | | 12 | 0 |
| Sagan Tosu | 2015 | J1 League | 19 | 0 | 3 | 0 | 4 | 0 | — | | — | | 26 | 0 |
| Sagan Tosu | 2016 | J1 League | 14 | 0 | — | | 6 | 0 | — | | — | | 20 | 0 |
| Sagan Tosu | Total | | 40 | 0 | 4 | 0 | 14 | 0 | — | | — | | 58 | 0 |
| FC Gifu (loan) | 2016 | J2 League | 9 | 0 | 0 | 0 | — | | — | | — | | 9 | 0 |
| Suwon Samsung Bluewings | 2017 | K League 1 | 22 | 0 | 3 | 0 | — | | 1 | 0 | — | | 26 | 0 |
| Suwon Samsung Bluewings | 2018 | K League 1 | 20 | 0 | 3 | 0 | — | | 9 | 1 | — | | 32 | 1 |
| Suwon Samsung Bluewings | 2019 | K League 1 | 30 | 2 | 5 | 0 | — | | — | | — | | 35 | 2 |
| Suwon Samsung Bluewings | 2020 | K League 1 | 5 | 0 | 0 | 0 | — | | 4 | 0 | — | | 9 | 0 |
| Suwon Samsung Bluewings | 2021 | K League 1 | 21 | 0 | 0 | 0 | — | | — | | — | | 21 | 0 |
| Suwon Samsung Bluewings | 2022 | K League 1 | 4 | 0 | 0 | 0 | — | | — | | 0 | 0 | 4 | 0 |
| Suwon Samsung Bluewings | 2023 | K League 1 | 1 | 0 | 0 | 0 | — | | — | | — | | 1 | 0 |
| Suwon Samsung Bluewings | Total | | 103 | 2 | 11 | 0 | — | | 14 | 1 | 0 | 0 | 128 | 3 |
| Career total | | | 162 | 2 | 18 | 0 | 18 | 0 | 14 | 1 | 0 | 0 | 212 | 3 |
