= Min Sang-gi =

South Korean footballer

Min Sang-Gi
Personal information
- Full name: Min Sang-Gi
- Date of birth: 27 August 1991
- Place of birth: South Korea
- Height: 1.84 m (6 ft 0 in)
- Position: Defender

Team information
- Current team: Gwangju
- Number: 39

Youth career
- 2007: Taesung High School
- 2007–2008: → Watford (KFA Youth Project)
- 2008–2009: Suwon Samsung Bluewings

Senior career*
Years	Team	Apps	(Gls)
2010–2024	Suwon Samsung Bluewings	175	(1)
2017–2018	→ Asan Mugunghwa (loan)	36	(1)
2023	→ Busan IPark (loan)	12	(0)
2024	Pohang Steelers	5	(0)
2025–	Gwangju	25	(0)

International career
2010–2011	Korea Republic U-20	4	(0)
2013	Korea Republic U-23	1	(0)
- * Club domestic league appearances and goals as of 4 August 2026

Min Sang-Gi (Korean: 민상기; born 27 August 1991) is a South Korean football midfielder who plays for Gwangju.

== Club career ==
Min joined Suwon Samsung Bluewings in 2010.

== Career statistics ==
As of 2 June 2024

Appearances and goals by club, season and competition
Club	Season	League	League		Cup		League Cup		Continental		Other		Total	
Club	Season	League	Apps	Goals	Apps	Goals	Apps	Goals	Apps	Goals	Apps	Goals	Apps	Goals
Suwon Samsung Bluewings	2010	K League 1	0	0	0	0	1	0	0	0	—		1	0
Suwon Samsung Bluewings	2011	K League 1	1	0	1	0	0	0	1	0	—		3	0
Suwon Samsung Bluewings	2012	K League 1	5	0	0	0	—		—		—		5	0
Suwon Samsung Bluewings	2013	K League 1	30	0	2	0	—		1	0	—		33	0
Suwon Samsung Bluewings	2014	K League 1	20	0	1	0	—		—		—		21	0
Suwon Samsung Bluewings	2015	K League 1	7	1	1	0	—		4	0	—		12	1
Suwon Samsung Bluewings	2016	K League 1	8	0	2	0	—		4	1	—		14	1
Suwon Samsung Bluewings	2017	K League 1	7	0	1	0	—		2	0	—		10	0
Suwon Samsung Bluewings	2019	K League 1	20	0	5	0	—		—		—		25	0
Suwon Samsung Bluewings	2020	K League 1	21	0	1	0	—		6	0	—		28	0
Suwon Samsung Bluewings	2021	K League 1	30	2	1	0	—		—		—		31	2
Suwon Samsung Bluewings	2022	K League 1	24	0	3	0	—		—		0	0	27	0
Suwon Samsung Bluewings	2023	K League 1	1	0	2	0	—		—		—		3	0
Suwon Samsung Bluewings	2024	K League 2	1	0	1	0	—		—		—		2	0
Suwon Samsung Bluewings	Total		175	3	21	0	1	0	18	1	0	0	215	4
Asan Mugunghwa (loan)	2017	K League 2	7	1	0	0	—		—		2	0	9	1
Asan Mugunghwa (loan)	2018	K League 2	27	0	2	0	—		—		—		29	0
Asan Mugunghwa (loan)	Total		34	1	2	0	—		—		2	0	38	1
Busan IPark (loan)	2023	K League 2	12	0	—		—		—		1	0	13	0
Career total			221	4	23	0	1	0	18	1	3	0	266	5
