= Kang Hyun-muk =

South Korean footballer (born 2001)

Personal information
- Date of birth: 28 March 2001 (age 25)
- Place of birth: South Korea
- Height: 1.75 m (5 ft 9 in)
- Position: Midfielder

Team information
- Current team: Suwon Samsung Bluewings
- Number: 17

Youth career
- 2018-2020: Suwon Samsung Bluewings Academy

Senior career*
Years	Team	Apps	(Gls)
2020–	Suwon Samsung Bluewings	108	(7)
2023–2024	→ Gimcheon Sangmu (army)	38	(8)

International career^{‡}
2022–	South Korea U23	3	(1)
- * Club domestic league appearances and goals as of 5 August 2026 ‡ National team caps and goals as of 12 September 2023

- Kang Hyun-muk
- Hangul: 강현묵
- RR: Gang Hyeonmuk
- MR: Kang Hyŏnmuk

Kang Hyun-muk (Korean: 강현묵; born 28 March 2001) is a South Korean professional footballer who plays as a midfielder for Suwon Samsung Bluewings.

== Career statistics ==
As of 3 November 2024.

Appearances and goals by club, season and competition
Club	Season	League			National cup		Continental		Other		Total	
Club	Season	Division	Apps	Goals	Apps	Goals	Apps	Goals	Apps	Goals	Apps	Goals
Suwon Samsung Bluewings	2020	K League 1	1	0	0	0	2	0	—		3	0
Suwon Samsung Bluewings	2021	K League 1	33	1	3	0	—		—		36	1
Suwon Samsung Bluewings	2022	K League 1	29	0	2	0	—		2	1	33	1
Suwon Samsung Bluewings	2024	K League 2	11	0	—		—		—		11	0
Suwon Samsung Bluewings	Total		74	1	5	0	2	0	2	1	83	2
Gimcheon Sangmu (army)	2023	K League 2	23	6	2	1	—		—		25	7
Gimcheon Sangmu (army)	2024	K League 1	15	2	0	0	—		—		15	2
Gimcheon Sangmu (army)	Total		38	8	2	1	—		—		40	9
Career total			112	9	7	1	2	0	2	1	123	11
