= Ha Seung-un =

South Korean footballer (born 1998)

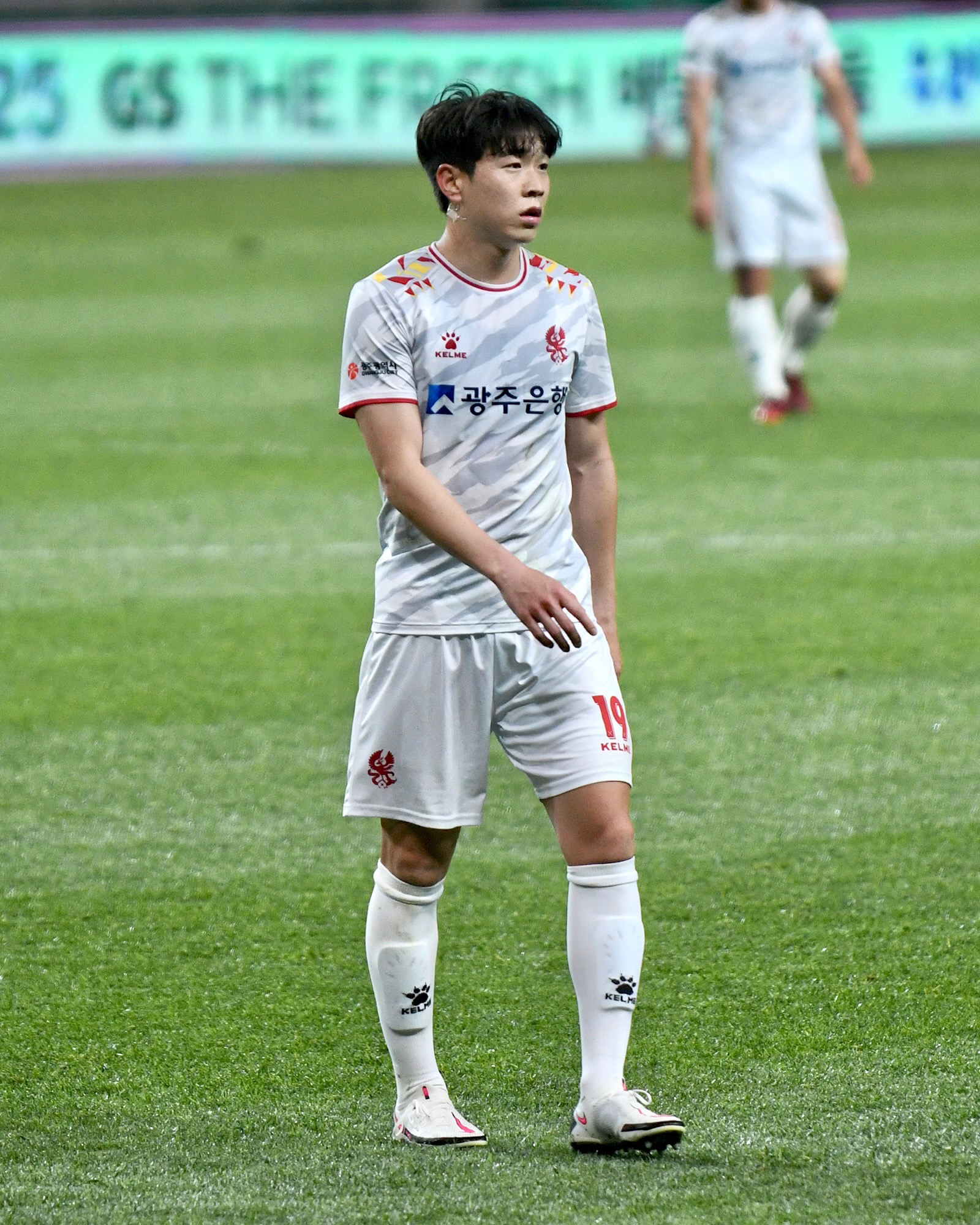
- Ha in 2023

Personal information
- Full name: Ha Seung-un
- Date of birth: 4 May 1998 (age 28)
- Place of birth: South Korea
- Height: 1.77 m (5 ft 10 in)
- Position: Forward

Team information
- Current team: Gwangju FC
- Number: 9

Youth career
- 2014–2017: Yongdungpo Technical High School
- 2017–2019: Yonsei University

Senior career*
Years	Team	Apps	(Gls)
2019–2021	Pohang Steelers	15	(2)
2020	→ Jeonnam Dragons (loan)	23	(2)
2021	→ FC Anyang (loan)	16	(1)
2022–	Gwangju FC	91	(5)

International career^{‡}
2017	South Korea U20	9	(0)
- * Club domestic league appearances and goals as of 4 August 2026 ‡ National team caps and goals as of 7 April 2019

- Ha Seung-un
- Hangul: 하승운
- RR: Ha Seungun
- MR: Ha Sŭngun

Ha Seung-un (Korean: 하승운; born 4 May 1998) is a South Korean football forward who plays for Gwangju FC.
