= Kim Joon-hyung (footballer) =

South Korean footballer (born 1996)

Personal information
- Full name: Kim Joon-hyung
- Date of birth: 5 April 1996 (age 30)
- Place of birth: South Korea
- Height: 1.77 m (5 ft 10 in)
- Position: Midfielder

Team information
- Current team: Bucheon FC 1995
- Number: 88

Senior career*
Years	Team	Apps	(Gls)
2017–2020	Suwon Samsung Bluewings	20	(0)
2019	→ Gwangju FC (loan)	16	(0)
2021	Suwon FC	12	(0)
2022 -	Bucheon FC 1995	35	(0)

International career^{‡}
2018–	South Korea	0	(0)
- * Club domestic league appearances and goals as of 8 October 2022 ‡ National team caps and goals as of 4 December 2018

- Kim Joon-hyung
- Hangul: 김준형
- RR: Gim Junhyeong
- MR: Kim Chunhyŏng

Kim Joon-hyung (Korean: 김준형; born 5 April 1996) is a South Korean football midfielder who plays for Bucheon 1995 FC.

== Career statistics ==
=== Clubs ===
Club performance			League		Cup		Continental		Total	
Season	Club	League	Apps	Goals	Apps	Goals	Apps	Goals	Apps	Goals
South Korea			League		KFA Cup		Asia		Total	
2017	Suwon Samsung Bluewings	K League 1	0	0	0	0	0	0	0	0
2018	Suwon Samsung Bluewings	K League 1	5	0	3	2	1	0	9	2
2019	Gwangju FC	K League 2	16	0	2	1	-		18	1
2020	Suwon Samsung Bluewings	K League 1	2	0	0	0	0	0	2	0
Total	South Korea		23	0	5	3	1	0	29	3
Career total			23	0	5	3	1	0	29	3
