= Kim Tae-hwan (footballer, born 2000) =

South Korean footballer

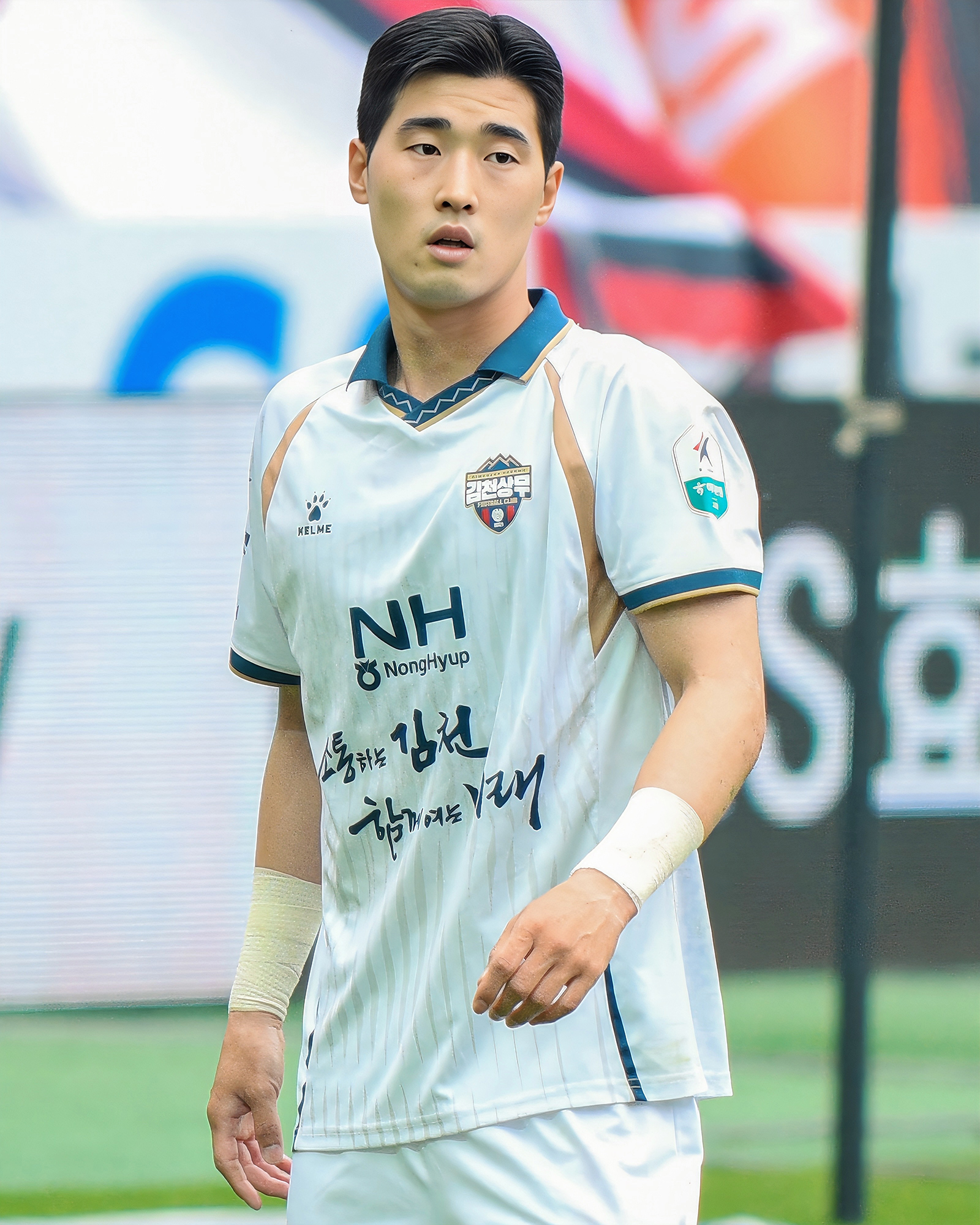
- Kim in 2026

Personal information
- Date of birth: 25 March 2000 (age 26)
- Place of birth: Seoul, South Korea
- Height: 1.79 m (5 ft 10 in)
- Position: Defender

Team information
- Current team: Gimcheon Sangmu
- Number: 11

Youth career
- 2016–2019: Maetan High School

Senior career*
Years	Team	Apps	(Gls)
2018–2023	Suwon Samsung Bluewings	11	(2)
2024–	Jeju SK	34	(2)
2025–	→ Gimcheon Sangmu (army)	25	(0)

International career^{‡}
2015–2016	South Korea U-17	14	(1)
2017	South Korea U-20	1	(0)
2020–2023	South Korea U-23	3	(1)
Korean name
Hangul	김태환
RR	Gim Taehwan
MR	Kim T'aehwan
- * Club domestic league appearances and goals as of 4 August 2026 ‡ National team caps and goals as of 11:10, 5 June 2022 (UTC)

Kim Tae-hwan (Korean: 김태환; born 25 March 2000) is a South Korean football defender who plays for Gimcheon Sangmu.
