= Choi Jung-won (footballer) =

South Korean footballer

Personal information
- Full name: Choi Jung-won
- Date of birth: August 16, 1995 (age 31)
- Place of birth: South Korea
- Height: 1.86 m (6 ft 1 in)
- Position: Defender

Team information
- Current team: Gyeongnam
- Number: 26

Senior career*
Years	Team	Apps	(Gls)
2018–2020	Fagiano Okayama	45	(0)
2021	Suwon Samsung Bluewings	19	(1)
2022–2025	Jeonnam Dragons	39	(0)
2023–2024	→ Dangjin Citizen (loan)	23	(3)
2026–	Gyeongnam	17	(1)
- * Club domestic league appearances and goals as of 6 August 2026

Choi Jung-won (Korean: 최정원; born August 16, 1995) is a South Korean football player who plays as a defender for K League 2 club Gyeongnam.
