= You Ju-an =

South Korean footballer

Personal information
- Full name: You Ju-an
- Date of birth: 1 October 1998 (age 28)
- Place of birth: Gwangmyeong, South Korea
- Height: 1.76 m (5 ft 9 in)
- Position: Forward

Team information
- Current team: Seongnam FC
- Number: 23

Youth career
- 2014–2016: Maetan High School

Senior career*
Years	Team	Apps	(Gls)
2017–2023	Suwon Samsung Bluewings	51	(4)
2020	→ Suwon FC (loan)	9	(0)
2023–	Seongnam FC	19	(1)
2024–2025	→ Namyangju FC (loan)	37	(10)

International career^{‡}
2013–2015	South Korea U-17	26	(10)
2016–	South Korea U-20	1	(0)
- * Club domestic league appearances and goals as of 6 August 2026 ‡ National team caps and goals as of June 25, 2017

- You Ju-an
- Hangul: 유주안
- RR: Yu Juan
- MR: Yu Chuan

You Ju-an (Korean: 유주안; born 1 October 1998) is a South Korean football forward who plays for Seongnam FC.

== Career ==
You started his career with Suwon Samsung Bluewings.
