= Lee Ki-je =

South Korean footballer

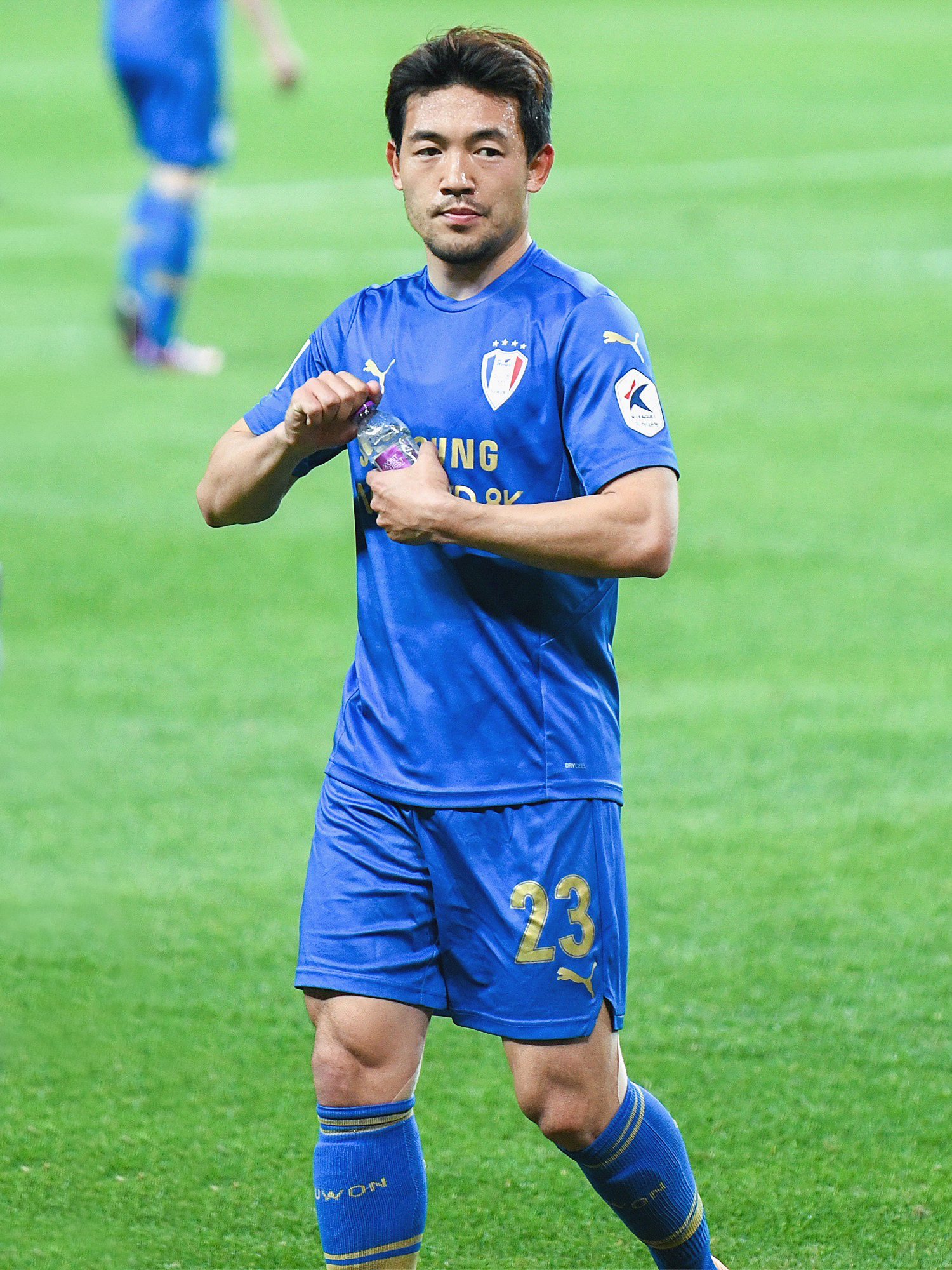
- Lee with Suwon Bluewings in April 2022

Personal information
- Full name: Lee Ki-Je
- Date of birth: July 9, 1991 (age 35)
- Place of birth: Changnyeong, South Korea
- Height: 1.76 m (5 ft 9 1/2 in)
- Position: Left back

Team information
- Current team: Bangkok United
- Number: 23

Youth career
- 2010–2011: Dongguk University

Senior career*
Years	Team	Apps	(Gls)
2012–2014	Shimizu S-Pulse	57	(1)
2015	Newcastle Jets	20	(2)
2016–2017	Ulsan Hyundai	43	(0)
2018–2026	Suwon Samsung Bluewings	182	(15)
2019–2020	→ Gimpo Citizen (draft)	32	(9)
2026	Mes Rafsanjan	5	(0)
2026–	Bangkok United	1	(0)

International career^{‡}
2010–2011	South Korea U-20	14	(2)
2014	South Korea U-23	1	(0)
2021–2024	South Korea	14	(0)
- * Club domestic league appearances and goals as of 13 April 2026 ‡ National team caps and goals as of 20 January 2024

Lee Ki-je (Korean: 이기제; born July 9, 1991) is a South Korean professional footballer who plays as a left back for Thai League 1 club Bangkok United.

== International career ==
He made his debut for South Korea national football team on 5 June 2021 in a World Cup qualifier against Turkmenistan.

== Club statistics ==
As of 3 November 2024

Club performance			League		Cup		League Cup		Continental		Other		Total	
Season	Club	League	Apps	Goals	Apps	Goals	Apps	Goals	Apps	Goals	Apps	Goals	Apps	Goals
Japan			League		Emperor's Cup		J.League Cup		ACL		—		Total	
2012	Shimizu S-Pulse	J1 League	33	0	2	0	6	1	—		—		41	1
2013	Shimizu S-Pulse	J1 League	17	1	0	0	4	0	—		—		21	1
2014	Shimizu S-Pulse	J1 League	7	0	5	1	1	0	—		—		13	1
Australia			League		FFA Cup		—		ACL		—		Total	
2014–15	Newcastle Jets	A-League	12	2	0	0	—		—		—		12	2
2015–16	Newcastle Jets	A-League	8	0	0	0	—		—		—		8	0
South Korea			League		KFA Cup		—		ACL		Play-offs		Total	
2016	Ulsan Hyundai	K League 1	35	0	3	0	—		—		—		38	0
2017	Ulsan Hyundai	K League 1	8	0	3	0	—		7 (Note: Appearances in AFC Champions League)	0	—		18	0
2018	Suwon Samsung Bluewings	K League 1	19	2	3	0	—		13	2	—		35	4
2019	Gimpo Citizen (draft)	K3 League	17	6	0	0	—		—		—		17	6
2020	Gimpo Citizen (draft)	K3 League	15	3	2	2	—		—		—		17	5
2020	Suwon Samsung Bluewings	K League 1	4	0	—		—		5	0	—		9	0
2021	Suwon Samsung Bluewings	K League 1	38	5	0	0	—		—		—		38	5
2022	Suwon Samsung Bluewings	K League 1	35	1	2	0	—		—		2 (Note: Appearances in K League promotion-relegation playoffs)	0	39	1
2023	Suwon Samsung Bluewings	K League 1	31	2	1	0	—		—		—		32	2
2024	Suwon Samsung Bluewings	K League 2	21	2	1	0	—		—		—		22	2
Country	Japan		57	1	7	1	11	1	—		—		75	3
Country	Australia		20	2	0	0	—		—		—		20	2
Country	South Korea		223	21	15	2	—		25	2	2	0	265	25
Total			300	24	22	3	11	1	25	2	2	0	360	30

== Honours ==
=== Club ===
Ulsan Hyundai

- KFA Cup: 2017

=== Individual ===
- K League 1 Best XI: 2021
- K League 1 top assist provider: 2022
