= Park Ji-min (footballer) =

Korean association football player

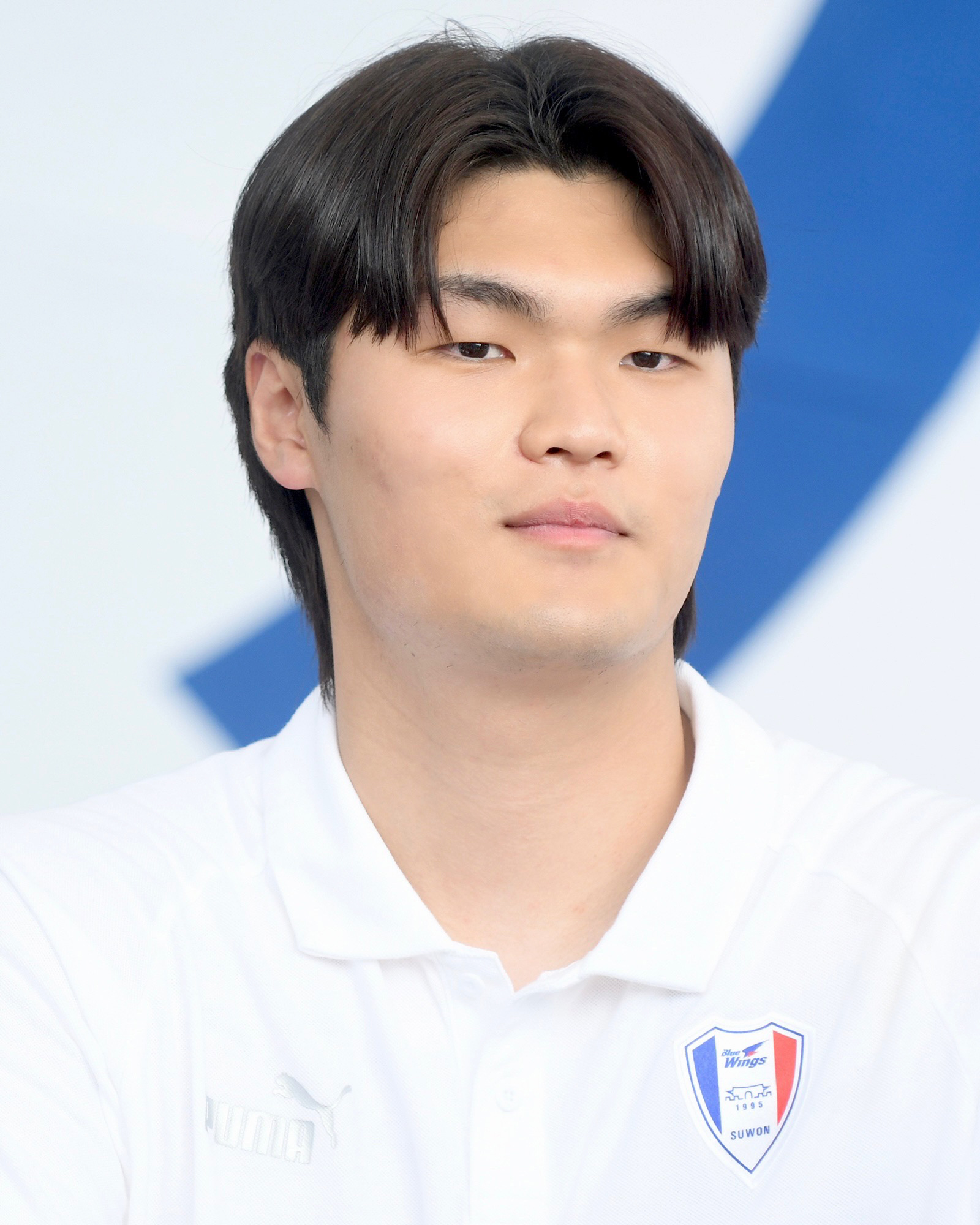
- Park with Suwon Bluewings in 2023

Personal information
- Date of birth: 25 May 2000 (age 26)
- Place of birth: Suwon, South Korea
- Height: 1.89 m (6 ft 2 in)
- Position: Goalkeeper

Team information
- Current team: Busan IPark
- Number: 34

Senior career*
Years	Team	Apps	(Gls)
2018–2025	Suwon Samsung Bluewings	13	(0)
2020–2021	→ Gimcheon Sangmu (army)	4	(0)
2025	→ Seongnam FC (loan)	7	(0)
2026–	Busan IPark	0	(0)

International career
2015–2016	South Korea U17	12	(0)
2018–2019	South Korea U20	4	(0)
2021–	South Korea U23	0	(0)
Medal record
Men's football
Representing South Korea
FIFA U-20 World Cup
Runner-up	2019 Poland
- * Club domestic league appearances and goals as of 5 August 2026

- Park Ji-min
- Hangul: 박지민
- RR: Bak Jimin
- MR: Pak Chimin

Park Ji-min (Korean: 박지민; born 25 May 2000) is a South Korean footballer currently playing as a goalkeeper for Busan IPark.

== Career statistics ==
=== Club ===
As of 20 February 2022.

Club	Season	League			Cup		Other		Total	
Club	Season	Division	Apps	Goals	Apps	Goals	Apps	Goals	Apps	Goals
Suwon Samsung Bluewings	2018	K League 1	0	0	0	0	0	0	0	0
Suwon Samsung Bluewings	2019	K League 1	1	0	0	0	0	0	1	0
Sangju Sangmu; Gimcheon Sangmu (army)	2020	K League 1	3	0	0	0	0	0	3	0
Sangju Sangmu; Gimcheon Sangmu (army)	2021	K League 2	1	0	0	0	0	0	1	0
Suwon Samsung Bluewings	2021	K League 1	0	0	0	0	0	0	0	0
Suwon Samsung Bluewings	2022	K League 1	1	0	0	0	0	0	0	0
Career total			6	0	0	0	0	0	6	0

== Honours ==
=== International ===
==== South Korea U20 ====
- FIFA U-20 World Cup runner-up: 2019
