= Park Dae-won =

South Korean footballer

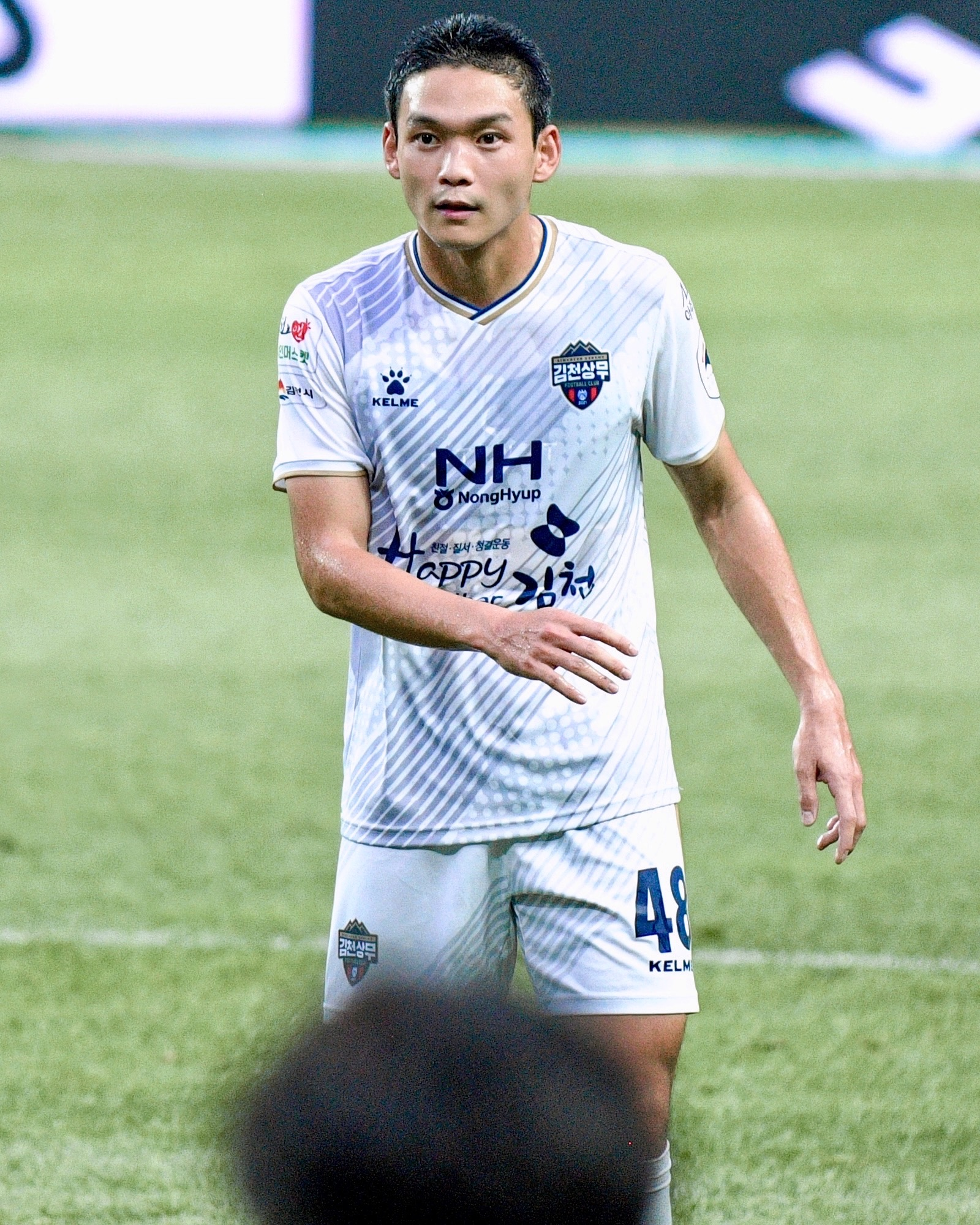
- Park in 2024

Personal information
- Date of birth: 25 February 1998 (age 28)
- Place of birth: Suwon, South Korea
- Height: 1.79 m (5 ft 10 in)
- Position: Defender

Team information
- Current team: Suwon Samsung Bluewings
- Number: 33

Youth career
- 2014–2016: Maetan High School
- 2017–2018: Korea University

Senior career*
Years	Team	Apps	(Gls)
2019–	Suwon Samsung Bluewings	94	(0)
2024–2025	→ Gimcheon Sangmu (army)	25	(0)

International career^{‡}
2013–2015	South Korea U-17	13	(1)
- * Club domestic league appearances and goals as of 5 August 2026 ‡ National team caps and goals as of 6 September 2015

- Park Dae-won
- Hangul: 박대원
- Hanja: 朴大元
- RR: Bak Daewon
- MR: Pak Taewŏn

Park Dae-won (Korean: 박대원; born 25 February 1998) is a South Korean football defender who plays for Suwon Samsung Bluewings.

== Career statistics ==
As of 28 April 2024.

Club	Season	League			Cup		Continental		Other		Total	
Club	Season	Division	Apps	Goals	Apps	Goals	Apps	Goals	Apps	Goals	Apps	Goals
Suwon Samsung Bluewings	2019	K League 1	4	0	1	0	—		—		5	0
Suwon Samsung Bluewings	2020	K League 1	4	0	0	0	2	0	—		6	0
Suwon Samsung Bluewings	2021	K League 1	27	0	1	0	—		—		28	0
Suwon Samsung Bluewings	2022	K League 1	11	0	0	0	—		0	0	11	0
Suwon Samsung Bluewings	2023	K League 1	31	0	2	0	—		—		33	0
Suwon Samsung Bluewings	2024	K League 2	7	0	0	0	—		—		7	0
Career total			84	0	4	0	2	0	0	0	90	0
