= Kim Dae-won (footballer, born 1992) =

South Korean footballer

Daewon Kim
Personal information
- Date of birth: 24 April 1992 (age 34)
- Position: Midfielder

Team information
- Current team: Pardubice
- Number: 19

Youth career
- FC Seoul
- FVE 08

Senior career*
Years	Team	Apps	(Gls)
- Blau-Weiß Friesdorf
2014–2016	Pardubice	47	(4)
- * Club domestic league appearances and goals as of 6 October 2019

Daewon Kim (born 24 April 1992) is a former professional South Korean football midfielder, who last played for FK Pardubice in the Czech National Football League.
