= Gwangju FC =

Association football club in South Korea

- Full name: Gwangju Football Club 광주시민프로축구단
- Founded: 2010; 16 years ago
- Ground: Gwangju World Cup Stadium
- Capacity: 40,245
- Owner: Gwangju Metropolitan City
- Chairman: Min Hyung-bae (Mayor of Jeonnam-Gwangju)
- Manager: Lee Jung-kyu
- League: K League 1
- 2025: K League 1, 7th of 12
- Website: www.gwangjufc.com
Home colours	Away colours

Gwangju FC (Korean: 광주 FC) is a South Korean professional football club based in Gwangju that competes in the K League 1, the top tier of South Korean football. They joined the K League in the 2011 season.

== History ==
Gwangju FC was founded in December 2010, becoming the 16th club in the K League, with Choi Man-hee appointed as the first manager. They finished their first season in 11th place. The club was relegated to the newly-formed second division K League Challenge (now K League 2) the following season after finishing in 15th place. In 2014, they were promoted back to the top tier for the 2015 season.

The club oscillated between the first and second tiers, winning the second division championship in 2019 and 2022.

In the 2023 K League 1 season, Gwangju achieved its best-ever performance under the leadership of Lee Jung-hyo, finishing third in the league and earning a spot in the AFC Champions League Elite for the first time. Under Lee's attacking playing style, Gwangju upset J1 League sides Yokohama F. Marinos 7–3 and Kawasaki Frontale 1–0 in their debut continental matches in the 2024–25 edition, qualifying for the knockout stage as the only South Korean club. After losing 2–0 in the first leg of the round of 16 against Vissel Kobe, they secured a 3–0 victory at home and advanced with a 3–2 aggregate score, becoming the first citizen club to reach the quarter-finals of the AFC Champions League.

After guiding Gwangju to the 2025 Korea Cup final, the club's first ever major cup final (which they lost 2–1 to Jeonbuk Hyundai Motors), Lee left the club for Suwon Samsung Bluewings at the end of the season.

== Stadium ==
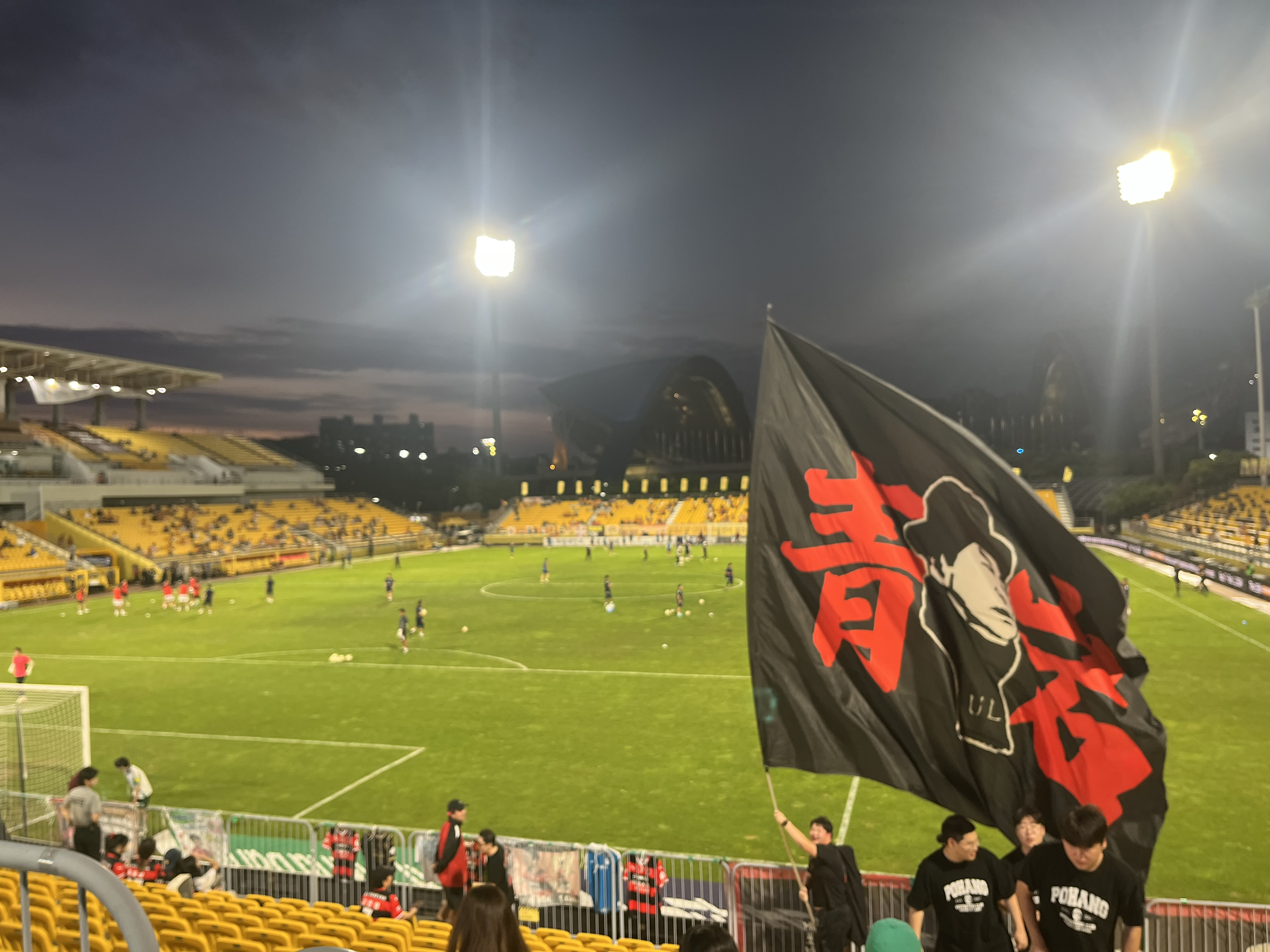
The Gwangju Football Stadium was the home of Gwangju FC between 2020 and 2024

Gwangju FC plays its home games at the 40,245-capacity Gwangju World Cup Stadium. Between 2020 and 2024, they played at the Gwangju Football Stadium, but had to move back to the World Cup Stadium ahead of the 2025 season due to the small size of the field and lack of seating.

== Rivalries and supporters ==
Gwangju's primary rivals are Daegu FC in a match dubbed the Moonlight Derby. The rivalry between the two clubs mirrors the strong baseball rivalry of Kia Tigers in Gwangju and Samsung Lions in Daegu, partially stemming from the stark difference in political leaning between the two cities.

Gwangju also shares a rivalry with nearby Jeonnam Dragons in the Yellow Derby.

The club's main supporters' group is called Bitgoeul, the native Korean name for Gwangju.

== Players ==
=== Current squad ===
As of 16 November 2026

Note: Flags indicate national team as defined under FIFA eligibility rules; some limited exceptions apply. Players may hold more than one non-FIFA nationality.

No.	Pos.	Nation	Player
1	GK	KOR	Kim Kyeong-min
2	DF	KOR	Jang Seok-hwan (on loan from Suwon Samsung Bluewings)
3	DF	KOR	Lee Min-ki
4	DF	NED	Teun van Grunsven
6	DF	KOR	Ahn Young-kyu (captain)
7	FW	SLO	Emir Saitoski
8	MF	KOR	Ju Se-jong
9	FW	KOR	Ha Seung-un
10	MF	KOR	Choi Kyoung-rok (vice-captain)
11	FW	ISL	Hólmbert Friðjónsson
13	DF	KOR	Doo Hyeon-seok
14	MF	KOR	Yoo Je-ho
16	MF	KOR	Jung Ji-hun
17	DF	BRA	João Pedro
18	FW	AUS	John Iredale
19	FW	KOR	An Hyuk-joo
20	DF	KOR	Lim Seung-gyeom
21	MF	KOR	Kim Jong-suk
22	MF	KOR	Kwon Sung-yoon

No.	Pos.	Nation	Player
23	GK	KOR	Kim Dong-hwa
24	DF	KOR	Kim Yong-hyeok
25	FW	KOR	Kim Yun-ho
26	DF	KOR	Kong Bae-hyeon
28	MF	KOR	Park Sung-hyun
33	DF	KOR	Park Won-jae
37	MF	PRK	Ri Yong-jik
39	DF	KOR	Min Sang-gi
40	FW	KOR	Sin Chang-moo (vice-captain)
42	MF	KOR	Kang Hee-soo
50	FW	CIV	Adriel Ba Loua
66	DF	KOR	Bae Jin-woo
70	MF	KOR	Kim Woo-jin
71	GK	KOR	Lee Yun-sung
77	MF	KOR	Oh Ha-jong
79	MF	KOR	Jeong Kyu-min
88	MF	KOR	Moon Min-seo
99	MF	KOR	Hong Yong-jun

=== Out on loan ===
Note: Flags indicate national team as defined under FIFA eligibility rules; some limited exceptions apply. Players may hold more than one non-FIFA nationality.

No. / Pos. / Nation / Player; — / DF / KOR / Kim Jin-ho (at Gimcheon Sangmu for military service)	No. / Pos. / Nation / Player; — / MF / KOR / Park Tae-jun (at Gimcheon Sangmu for military service)

== Backroom staff ==
=== Coaching staff ===
- Manager: (South Korea) Lee Jung-kyu
- Head coach: (South Korea) Ma Chul-jun
- Coach: (South Korea) Cho Yong-tae
- Goalkeeping coach: (South Korea) Shin Jeong-hwan
- Fitness coach: (South Korea) Kim Kyung-do
- Analysis coach: (South Korea) Park Won-gyo

=== Support staff ===
- Analyst: (South Korea) Yook Tae-hun
- Medical staff: (South Korea) Shin Yong-sub, (South Korea) Kim Min-shik, (South Korea) Go Han-seul, (South Korea) Yang Jae-hyuk
- Interpreter: (South Korea) Choi Hyuk-soon
- Kit manager: (South Korea) Oh Dong-yeong
- Logistics manager: (South Korea) Jeon Chung-hwi
- Team doctor: (South Korea) Lee Jun-young

Source: Official website

== Managers ==
No.	Name	From	To	Season(s)
1	(South Korea) Choi Man-hee	2010/10/18	2012/12/01	2011–2012
2	(South Korea) Yeo Bum-kyu	2012/12/06	2013/08/16	2013
C	(South Korea) Nam Ki-il	2013/08/16	2015/01/03	2013–2014
3	(South Korea) Nam Ki-il	2015/01/04	2017/08/14	2015–2017
4	(South Korea) Kim Hak-bum	2017/08/16	2017/11/18	2017
5	(South Korea) Park Jin-sub	2017/12/16	2020/12/01	2018–2020
6	(South Korea) Kim Ho-young	2020/12/22	2021/12/04	2021
7	(South Korea) Lee Jung-hyo	2021/12/28	2025/12/21	2022–2025
8	(South Korea) Lee Jung-kyu	2025/12/24		2026–

== Honours ==
- K League 2
  - Winners (2): 2019, 2022
  - Runners-up (1): 2014
- Korea Cup
  - Runners-up (1): 2025

== Season-by-season records ==
=== Domestic ===
Season	League										Cup
Season	Division	GP	W	D	L	GF	GA	GD	Pts	Pos.	Cup
2011	1	30	9	8	13	32	43	–11	35	11	Ro32
2012	1	44	10	15	19	57	67	–10	45	15↓	Ro16
2013	2	35	16	5	14	55	54	+1	53	3	Ro16
2014	2	36	13	12	11	40	35	+5	51	4↑	Ro16
2015	1	38	10	12	16	35	44	–9	42	10	Ro32
2016	1	38	11	14	13	41	45	–4	47	8	Ro16
2017	1	38	6	12	20	33	61	–28	30	12↓	QF
2018	2	36	11	15	10	51	41	+10	48	5	3R
2019	2	36	21	10	5	59	31	+28	73	1↑	Ro16
2020	1	27	6	7	14	32	46	–14	25	6	Ro16
2021	1	38	10	7	21	42	54	–12	37	12↓	3R
2022	2	40	25	11	4	68	32	+36	86	1↑	Ro16
2023	1	38	16	11	11	47	35	+12	59	3	QF
2024	1	38	14	5	19	42	49	–7	47	9	SF
2025	1	38	15	9	14	40	41	–1	54	7	RU

Key

- RU = Runners-up
- SF = Semi-final
- QF = Quarter-final
- Ro16 = Round of 16
- Ro32 = Round of 32
- 3R = Third round

=== Continental ===
All results list Gwangju's goal tally first.

==== AFC Champions League Elite ====
Season	Round	Opposition	Home	Away	Aggregate
2024–25	League stage	(Japan) Yokohama F. Marinos	7–3	—N/a	4th out of 12
2024–25	League stage	(Japan) Kawasaki Frontale	—N/a	1–0	4th out of 12
2024–25	League stage	(Malaysia) Johor Darul Ta'zim	3–1	—N/a	4th out of 12
2024–25	League stage	(Japan) Vissel Kobe	—N/a	0–2	4th out of 12
2024–25	League stage	(China) Shanghai Shenhua	1–0	—N/a	4th out of 12
2024–25	League stage	(China) Shanghai Port	—N/a	1–1	4th out of 12
2024–25	League stage	(China) Shandong Taishan	—N/a	1–3 (voided)	4th out of 12
2024–25	League stage	(Thailand) Buriram United	2–2	—N/a	4th out of 12
2024–25	Round of 16	(Japan) Vissel Kobe	3–0 (a.e.t.)	0–2	3–2
2024–25	Quarter-final	(Saudi Arabia) Al Hilal	0–7 (Note: Played at a neutral venue.)		—N/a
