= Jang (Korean surname) =

Romanization of the common Korean surname 장

- Hangul: 장
- Hanja: 張; 章; 莊; 蔣
- RR: Jang
- MR: Chang

Jang, Chang and (less often) Zang are romanizations of the common Korean surname 장. As of the South Korean census of 2015, there were 1,021,107 people by this name in South Korea or 2.05% of the population.

== Romanization ==
In a study by the National Institute of the Korean Language based on 2007 application data for South Korean passports, it was found that 84.5% of people with this surname spelled it in Latin letters as Jang in their passports. Another 14.9% spelled it as Chang, and 0.2% as Zhang. Rare alternative spellings included Jahng and Jean.

== Distribution ==
During the 2000 South Korean Census, there were close to 920,000 people in South Korea– 2.1% of the general population–with this surname, most written with the hanja 張.

Jang is a relatively common surname in the United States and was listed 5,531st overall during the 2000 US Census, and 11th among Asian and Pacific Islanders in 2000. Zang was much less common and ranked 14,627th.

In China, the Chinese surnames Zhang (Hanja 張), Zhang (章), Zhuang (莊) and Jiang (蔣) use the same Chinese characters as the Korean surname Jang.

== List of people with the surname ==
=== Historical figures ===
- Chang Pogo (787–846), military leader of late Silla
- Chang Kyehyang (1598–1680), Joseon writer
- Chang Hŭnghyo (1564–1633), Joseon Neo-Confucianism principal scholar
- Jang Hui-bin (1659–1701), Joseon concubine
- Chang Hyŏn'gwang (1554–1637), Joseon politician and educator
- Jang Nok-su (c. 1485–1506), Joseon concubine
- Jang Seung-eop (1843–1897), Joseon painter
- Chang Yŏngsil (1390–c. 1450), Joseon scientist and astronomer

=== Modern figures ===
==== Jang ====
- Jang Baek-gyu (born 1991), South Korean footballer
- Jang Beom-june (born 1989), South Korean singer-songwriter
- Jang Byeong-cheol (born 1976), South Korean volleyball player
- Jang Chan-jae (born 1989), South Korean former professional cyclist
- Jang Chang (born 1996), South Korean footballer
- Jang Chang-ha (born 1964), North Korean general and politician
- Jang Chealmun (born 1966), South Korean poet and writer
- Jang Cheol-soo (born 1974), South Korean film director
- Jang Chol (born 1955), North Korean politician and scientist
- Jang Chul-min (born 1972), South Korean former footballer
- Jang Chul-woo (born 1971), South Korean retired footballer
- Jang Dae-hyeon (born 1997), South Korean singer, member of boy band WEi
- Jang Dae-il (born 1975), South Korean former footballer
- Jang Dae-kyu (born 1976), South Korean sport shooter
- Jang Deog-cheon (born 1965), South Korean lawyer and politician
- Jang Deok-jin (1934–2017), South Korean lawyer and politician
- Jang Do-yeon (born 1985), South Korean comedian
- Jang Do-yoon (born 1995), South Korean actor
- Jang Dok-ryong (born 1953), North Korean former wrestler
- Jang Dong-gun (born 1972), South Korean actor and musician
- Jang Dong-hyuk (born 1983), South Korean footballer
- Jang Dong-hyun (handballer) (born 1995), South Korean handball player
- Jang Dong-joo (born 1994), South Korean actor
- Jang Dong-kyu (born 1988), South Korean professional golfer
- Jang Dong-min (born 1979), South Korean comedian
- Jang Dong-shin (born 1976), South Korean ice sledge hockey player, Paralympic bronze medalist
- Jang Dong-suk (born 1970), South Korean former field hockey player
- Jang Dong-woo (born 1990), South Korean singer and rapper, member of boy band Infinite
- Jang Dong-yoon (born 1992), South Korean actor
- Jang Eu-suk, South Korean taekwondo practitioner
- Jang Eui-soo (born 1990), South Korean actor and model
- Jang Eun-jin (born 1976), South Korean writer
- Jang Eun-kyu (born 1992), South Korean footballer
- Jang Gil-hyeok (born 1987), South Korean footballer
- Jang Gil-su (born 1984), North Korean defector
- Jang Gwang (born 1952), South Korean actor
- Jang Gyeol-hee (born 1998), South Korean former footballer
- Jang Gyeong-hwan (born 1991), South Korean retired esports player
- Jang Gyu-ri (born 1997), South Korean actress and former singer
- Jang Ha-na (born 1992), South Korean professional golfer
- Jang Hak-young (born 1981), South Korean footballer
- Jang Han-byul (born 1990), Australian singer and actor
- Jang Hang-jun (born 1969), South Korean filmmaker
- Jang Hee-jin (born 1983), South Korean actress
- Jang Hee-jung (born 1982), South Korean actress
- Jang Hee-mang (born 1992), South Korean footballer
- Jang Hee-ryung (born 1993), South Korean actress and model
- Jang Hee-sun (born 1986), South Korean field hockey player
- Jang Ho-ik (born 1993), South Korean professional footballer
- Jang Hong-won (born 1990), South Korean former footballer
- Jang Hoon (born 1975), South Korean film director
- Isao Harimoto (born Jang Hun, 1940), Zainichi Korean former baseball player
- Jang Hye-ji (born 1997), South Korean curler
- Jang Hye-jin (born 1975), South Korean actress
- Jang Hye-ock (born 1977), South Korean badminton player
- Jang Hye-young (born 1987), South Korean politician and human rights activist
- Jang Hyo-jo (1956–2011), South Korean baseball player
- Jang Hyuk (born 1976), South Korean actor and rapper
- Jang Hyuk-jin (born 1971), South Korean actor
- Jang Hyun-kyu (1981–2012), South Korean footballer
- Jang Hyun-sik (born 1995), South Korean professional baseball player
- Jang Hyun-soo (born 1991), South Korean professional footballer
- Jang Hyun-soo (footballer, born 1993), South Korean footballer
- Jang Hyun-seung (born 1989), South Korean singer, member of boy band Highlight
- Jang Hyun-sung (born 1970), South Korean actor
- Jang Hyung-seok (born 1972), South Korean football player
- Jang Ik-jae (born 1973), South Korean professional golfer
- Jang In-gwon (born 1945), South Korean judoka
- Jang In-hwan (1875–1930) Korean independence activist
- Jang In-sub (born 1987), South Korean actor
- Jang In-won (born 1936), South Korean speed skater
- Jang Ja-yeon (1982–2009), South Korean actress
- Jang Jae-ho (born 1986), South Korean professional gamer
- Jang Jae-hyun (born 1981), South Korean film director and screenwriter
- Jang Jae-in (born 1991), South Korean singer-songwriter
- Jang Jae-keun (born 1962), South Korean former sprinter
- Jang Jae-sim (born 1980), South Korean retired judoka
- Jang Jae-sung (born 1975), South Korean retired wrestler
- Jang Jeong (born 1980), South Korean golfer
- Jang Jeongil (born 1962), South Korean poet, playwright, novelist
- Jang Jeong-min (born 1994), South Korean rugby sevens player
- Jang Jin (born 1971), South Korean film director, playwright, screenwriter
- Jang Jin-young (1972–2009), South Korean actress
- Jang Jo-yoon (born 1988), South Korean retired footballer
- Jang Jong-ho (born 1984), South Korean ice sledge hockey player, Paralympic bronze medalist
- Jang Jong-hyun (born 1984), South Korean field hockey player
- Jang Jong-nam (born c. 1960), North Korean military and politician
- Jang Joon-hwan (born 1970), South Korean film director
- Jang Ju-won (born 1937), South Korean master of jade carver
- Jang Jun (born 2000), South Korean taekwondo practitioner, Olympic bronze medalist
- Jang Jun-young (born 1993), South Korean footballer
- Jang Jung (born 1964), South Korean former footballer
- Chae Jung-an (born Jang Jung-an, 1977) South Korean actress
- Jang Jung-hee (born 1958), South Korean actress
- Jang Keun-suk (born 1987), South Korean actor and singer
- Jang Ki-bum (born 1990), South Korean actor
- Jang Ki-yong (born 1992), South Korean actor and model
- Jang Kuk-chol (born 1994), North Korean professional footballer
- Jang Kun-jae (born 1977), South Korean film director, screenwriter, cinematographer
- Jang Kyung-gu (born 1990), South Korean road bicycle racer
- Jang Kyung-ik (born 1972), South Korean producer and entertainment executive
- Jang Kyung-jin (born 1983), South Korean footballer
- Jang Kyung-tae (born 1983), South Korean politician
- Jang Mi-inae (born 1984), South Korean former actress
- Jang Mi-ja (1941–2025), South Korean actress
- Jang Mi-kwan (born 1989), South Korean model and actor
- Jang Mi-ran (born 1983), South Korean weightlifter, Olympic gold medalist
- Jang Min-chul (born 1991), South Korean professional esports player
- Jang Min-hee (born 1999), South Korean archer, Olympic gold medalist
- Jang Min-gyu (born 1999), South Korean footballer
- Jang Min-hyeok (born 1978), South Korean voice actor
- Jang Minho (born 1977), South Korean singer
- Jang Myeong-hui (born 1969), South Korean rower
- Jang Na-ra (born 1981), South Korean actress and singer
- Jang Nam-seok (born 1983), South Korean former footballer
- Jang Ok-gyong (born 1980), North Korean footballer
- Jang Ok-rim (born 1948), North Korean former volleyball player
- Jang Ok-sun (born 1967), South Korean government official
- Jang Pill-joon (born 1988), South Korean baseball player
- Jang Ri-ra (born 1969), South Korean team handball player, Olympic gold medalist
- Jang Sa-ik (born 1949), South Korean singer
- Jang Sang-won (born 1977), South Korean footballer
- Jang Se-hong (born 1953), North Korean retired wrestler, Olympic silver medalist
- Jang Sel-gi (born 1994), South Korean footballer
- Jang Seo-hee (born 1972), South Korean actress
- Jang Seok-hwan (born 2004), South Korean footballer
- Jang Seoknam (born 1965), South Korean poet
- Jang Seong-beom (born 1995) South Korean actor
- Jang Seong-man (1932–2015), South Korean politician
- Jang Seong-min (born 1992), South Korean rugby sevens player
- Jang Seong-won (born 1997), South Korean footballer
- Jang Seung-jo (born 1981), South Korean actor
- Jang Shin-young (born 1984), South Korean actress
- Jang Si-hwan (born 1987), South Korean professional baseball player
- Jang Sin-kweon (born 1983), South Korean long-distance runner
- Jang So-hee (born 1978), South Korean handball player, Olympic silver medalist
- Jang So-yeon (born 1980), South Korean actress
- Jang Song-man (born 1985), North Korean table tennis player
- Jang Song-thaek (1946–2013), North Korean politician
- Jang Song-u (1933–2009), North Korean politician and general
- Jang Soo-ji (born 1987), South Korean field hockey player
- Jang Soo-young (born 1988), South Korean badminton player
- Jang Su-jeong (born 1995), South Korean tennis player
- Jang Su-won (born 1980), South Korean actor and singer, member of boy band Sechs Kies
- Jang Sun-hyoung (born 1975), South Korean former basketball player
- Jang Sun-jae (born 1984), South Korean former professional cyclist
- Jang Sun-woo (born 1952), South Korean film director
- Jang Sun-yong (born 1951), North Korean archer
- Jang Sung-ho (baseball) (born 1977), South Korean baseball player
- Jang Sung-ho (judoka) (born 1978), South Korean judoka, Olympic silver medalist
- Jang Sung-kyu (born 1983), South Korean television host and former news announcer
- Jang Sung-min (born 1963), South Korean politician
- Jang Sung-woo (born 1990), South Korean baseball player
- Jang Tae-eun (born 1964), South Korean gymnast
- Jang Tae-sung (born 1980), South Korean actor
- Jang Tae-wan (1931–2010), South Korean army general and politician
- Jang Tae-yoo (born 1972), South Korean television director
- Jang Won-sam (born 1983), South Korean baseball player
- Jang Won-seok (born 1986), South Korean footballer
- Jang Won-young (born 2004), South Korean singer, member of girl group IVE
- Jang Woo-hyuk (born 1978), South Korean singer and rapper, member of boy band H.O.T.
- Jang Woo-jin (born 1995), South Korean table tennis player
- Jang Wooyoung (born 1989), South Korean singer, member of boy band 2PM
- Jang Ye-eun (born 1998), South Korean singer and rapper, member of girl group CLC
- Jang Ye-won (born 1990), South Korean television personality and host
- Jang Yeong (born 1934), South Korean speed skater
- Jang Yeong-cheol (born 1964), South Korean sprint canoeist
- Jang Yeong-jin (born 1957/1958), the only openly gay North Korean defector
- Jang Yeong-jin (table tennis) (born 1993), South Korean para table tennis player, Paralympic silver medalist
- Jang Yeon-hak (born 1997), South Korean weightlifter
- Jang Jung-hyuk (born 1997), North Korean MMA fighter
- Jang Yong (born 1945), South Korean actor
- Jang Yong-chol (1964–2014?), North Korean former diplomat
- Jang Yong-ho (born 1976), South Korean archer, Olympic gold medalist
- Jang Yong-ok (born 1982), North Korean former footballer
- Jang Yoo-sang (born 1991), South Korean actor and model
- Jang Yoon-jeong (Miss Korea) (born 1970), South Korean actress, host, Miss Korea 1987
- Jang Yoon-jeong (singer) (born 1980), South Korean trot singer
- Jang Yoon-ju (born 1980), South Korean model, actress, singer-songwriter
- Jang Yoon-jung (born 1966), South Korean former taekwondo practitioner
- Jang Young-chul (politician) (1936–2023), South Korean politician
- Jang Young-chul (born 1968), South Korean television screenwriter
- Jang Young-nam (born 1973), South Korean actress
- Jang Young-ran (born 1979), South Korean actress and trot singer
- Jang Young-sik (born 1935), South Korean economist
- Jang Young-soo (born 1982), South Korean badminton player

==== Chang ====
- Chang Byung-gyu (born 1973), South Korean business executive and investor
- Chang Chang-sun (born 1942), South Korean retired wrestler, Olympic silver medalist
- Chang Chun-ha (1918–1975), Korean independence activist, journalist and politician
- Chang Dae-whan (born 1952), South Korean businessman
- David Chang (born 1977), American restaurateur
- Chang Deok-soo (1894–1947), Korean politician, independence activist, journalist
- Do Won Chang (born 1954), Korean-born American businessman, founder of Forever 21
- Chang Do-yong (1923–2012), South Korean general and politician
- Chang Eui-jong (born 1969), South Korean former tennis player
- Chang Eun-jung (born 1970), South Korean former field hockey player, Olympic silver medalist
- Chang Eun-kyung (1951–1996), South Korean judoka, Olympic silver medalist
- Chang Gyu-cheol (born 1992), South Korean swimmer
- Ha-Joon Chang (born 1963), South Korean economist specializing in development economics
- Hasok Chang (born 1967), Korean-born American historian and philosopher of science
- Chang Ho-chirl (born 1962), South Korean-Taiwanese singer
- Chang Hye-jin (born 1987), South Korean former recurve archer, Olympic gold medalist
- Chang Hyo-hui (1948–2003), South Korean Protestant pastor, social activist, theologian
- Chang Hyuk-jin (born 1989), South Korean professional footballer
- Chang Je-won (1967–2025), South Korean politician
- Juju Chang (born 1965), American journalist
- Chang Jung-koo (born 1963), South Korean former professional boxer
- Chang Jung-sook (born 1952), South Korean politician
- Chang Jung-yeon (born 1977), South Korean javelin thrower
- Chang Kang-myoung (born 1975), South Korean writer
- Katie Chang (born 1995), American actress
- Chang Kee-ryo (1911–1995), South Korean physician
- Chang Kiha (born 1982), South Korean entertainer
- Leonard Chang, Korean American writer
- Chang Mi-hee (born 1958), South Korean actress
- Chang Myon (1899–1966), South Korean politician
- Chang Myung-sam (1963–2012), South Korean taekwondo practitioner
- Chang Myung-su (born 1956), South Korean former figure skater
- Chang Pyung-soon (born 1951), South Korean businessman
- Chang Ri-jin (1917–unknown), Japanese-Korean basketball player
- Chang Ryul (born 1989), South Korean actor and model
- Chang Sang (born 1939), South Korean academic and politician
- Sarah Chang (born 1980), Korean-American violinist
- Chang So-yun (born 1974), South Korean volleyball player
- Chang Song-rok (born 1969), North Korean cross-country skier
- Chang Tae-il (born 1965), South Korean retired boxer
- Chang Tae-suk (born 1968), South Korean fencer
- Chang Taek-sang (1893–1969), South Korean politician
- Tommy Chang (martial artist) (born 1966), South Korean-Canadian martial artist, stunt performer, actor
- Chang Ucchin (1917–1990), South Korean painter, one of the most representative modern Korean artists
- Chang Ung (born 1938), North Korean sports administrator
- Chang Wang-rok (1924–1994), South Korean literary scholar, founding figure in translation and critique of English literature
- Chang Woe-ryong (born 1959), South Korean football coach and former player
- Chang Won-jun (born 1985), South Korean baseball player
- Chung Woo-taik (born 1953), South Korean politician
- Chang Wook-jin, South Korean diplomat
- Chang Woon-soo (1928–1992), South Korean football manager
- Chang Yong-ae, North Korean former track and field runner
- Chang Yong-hak (1921–1999), South Korean writer
- Chang Yong-heung (born 1993), South Korean rugby sevens player
- Chang Yong-joon (stage name Noel, born 2000), South Korean rapper
- Chang Yong-ok, North Korean former international table tennis player
- Chang Yoon-chang (1960–2025), South Korean volleyball player
- Chang Yoon-hee (born 1970), South Korean retired volleyball player
- Chang Yoon-hyun (born 1967), South Korean film director
- Chang Young-hee (1952–2009), South Korean professor and scholar
- Chang Youngsuk (born 1988), South Korean professional esports player

=== Fictional characters ===
- Ben Chang, character in the TV series Community
- Chang Koehan, character in the video game series King of Fighters

== See also ==
- Korean name
- List of Korean surnames
- Zhang (surname)
- Chang (surname)
