= 2014 AFC U-16 Championship =

ฟุตบอลเอเชียเยาวชนอายุไม่เกิน 16 ปี 2014

Tournament details
- Host country: Thailand
- Dates: 6–20 September
- Teams: 16 (from 1 confederation)
- Venue: 2 (in 2 host cities)

Final positions
- Champions: North Korea (2nd title)
- Runners-up: South Korea

Tournament statistics
- Matches played: 31
- Goals scored: 94 (3.03 per match)
- Attendance: 9,954 (321 per match)
- Top scorer(s): (South Korea) Lee Seung-woo (5 goals)
- Best player: (South Korea) Lee Seung-woo

The 2014 AFC U-16 Championship was the 16th edition of the biennial international youth football tournament organized by the Asian Football Confederation (AFC) for players aged 16 and below. Thailand were approved as hosts of the competition on 25 April 2013. The tournament was held from 6 to 20 September 2014, with the top four teams qualifying for the 2015 FIFA U-17 World Cup in Chile.

North Korea won the tournament, and were joined by South Korea, Australia, and Syria as AFC qualifiers for the 2015 FIFA U-17 World Cup.

== Venues ==
Bangkok	Nonthaburi
Rajamangala Stadium	Thunderdome Stadium
Capacity: 49,722	Capacity: 15,000
Location of stadiums of the 2014 AFC U-16 Championship

== Qualification ==
The draw for the qualifiers was held on 26 April 2013 in Kuala Lumpur, Malaysia.

=== Qualified teams ===
- Australia
- China
- Hong Kong
- Iran
- Japan
- Kuwait
- Malaysia
- Nepal
- North Korea
- Oman
- Qatar
- Saudi Arabia
- South Korea
- Syria
- Thailand (hosts)
- Uzbekistan

== Draw ==
The draw for the competition was held on 6 April 2014 in Bangkok, Thailand.

Pot 1 (Host & Seeds)	Pot 2	Pot 3	Pot 4
Thailand; Uzbekistan; Japan; Iran	South Korea; Syria; Kuwait; Australia	China; Oman; North Korea; Saudi Arabia	Qatar; Nepal; Malaysia; Hong Kong

== Group stage ==
The top two teams from each group advanced to the quarter-finals.

If two or more teams are equal on points on completion of the group matches, the following criteria were applied to determine the rankings.

1. Greater number of points obtained in the group matches between the teams concerned;
2. Goal difference resulting from the group matches between the teams concerned;
3. Greater number of goals scored in the group matches between the teams concerned;
4. Goal difference in all the group matches;
5. Greater number of goals scored in all the group matches;
6. Kicks from the penalty mark if only two teams are involved and they are both on the field of play;
7. Fewer score calculated according to the number of yellow and red cards received in the group matches;
8. Drawing of lots.

All times are local (UTC+7).

=== Group A ===
Team	Pld	W	D	L	GF	GA	GD	Pts
South Korea	3	3	0	0	6	1	+5	9
Malaysia	3	2	0	1	3	2	+1	6
Thailand	3	1	0	2	1	3	−2	3
Oman	3	0	0	3	2	6	−4	0

6 September 2014
16:00

South Korea	3–1	Oman
Kim Jung-min 22'; Yoo Seung-min 86'; You Ju-an 90'	Report	Al-Yahmadi 31'

SCG Stadium, Nonthaburi
Attendance: 200
Referee: Alireza Faghani (Iran)
6 September 2014
20:00

Thailand	0–1	Malaysia
	Report	Syazwan 34'

SCG Stadium, Nonthaburi
Attendance: 2,000
Referee: Yuichi Nishimura (Japan)

8 September 2014
16:00

Malaysia	0–1	South Korea
	Report	Lee Seung-woo 15'

SCG Stadium, Nonthaburi
Attendance: 100
Referee: Ali Shaban (Kuwait)
8 September 2014
20:00

Oman	0–1	Thailand
	Report	Samart 60'

SCG Stadium, Nonthaburi
Attendance: 700
Referee: Peter Green (Australia)

10 September 2014
20:00

Thailand	0–2	South Korea
	Report	Lee Seung-woo 45+1'; Hwang Tae-hyeon 62'

SCG Stadium, SCG Stadium, Nonthaburi
Attendance: 800
Referee: Ammar Al Junaibi (United Arab Emirates)
10 September 2014
20:00

Oman	1–2	Malaysia
Al-Ubaidani 68'	Report	Najmuddin 64', 77'

Rajamangala Stadium, Bangkok
Attendance: 101
Referee: Dmitriy Mashentsev (Kyrgyzstan)

=== Group B ===
Team	Pld	W	D	L	GF	GA	GD	Pts
Australia	3	3	0	0	9	2	+7	9
Japan	3	2	0	1	7	4	+3	6
China	3	1	0	2	2	6	−4	3
Hong Kong	3	0	0	3	0	6	−6	0

6 September 2014
16:00

Japan	2–0	Hong Kong
Doan 53'; Suga 73'	Report

Rajamangala Stadium, Bangkok
Attendance: 154
Referee: Valentin Kovalenko (Uzbekistan)
6 September 2014
19:00

Australia	3–0	China
Bandiera 16'; Joice 60'; Petratos 72'	Report

Rajamangala Stadium, Bangkok
Attendance: 130
Referee: Mohanad Qasim Sarray (Iraq)

8 September 2014
16:00

Hong Kong	0–2	Australia
	Report	Devereux 27'; Reiners 86'

Rajamangala Stadium, Bangkok
Attendance: 102
Referee: Ammar Al Junaibi (United Arab Emirates)
8 September 2014
19:00

China	0–3	Japan
	Report	Suga 48' (pen.); Onozawa 54'; Nagasawa 57'

Rajamangala Stadium, Bangkok
Attendance: 200
Referee: Fahad Jaber Al Marri (Qatar)

10 September 2014
16:00

Japan	2–4	Australia
Sasaki 27'; Yasui 69'	Report	Brimmer 15', 59'; Joice 25', 81'

SCG Stadium, Nonthaburi
Attendance: 350
Referee: Alireza Faghani (Iran)
10 September 2014
16:00

China	2–0	Hong Kong
He Xin 25' (pen.); Duan Liuyu 66'	Report

Rajamangala Stadium, Bangkok
Attendance: 50
Referee: Ali Shaban (Kuwait)

=== Group C ===
Team	Pld	W	D	L	GF	GA	GD	Pts
Uzbekistan	3	2	1	0	8	5	+3	7
North Korea	3	2	0	1	9	4	+5	6
Nepal	3	1	1	1	4	6	−2	4
Kuwait	3	0	0	3	3	9	−6	0

7 September 2014
16:00

Uzbekistan	1–1	Nepal
Kuchimov 54' (pen.)	Report	Sunar 90+4'

SCG Stadium, Nonthaburi
Attendance: 165
Referee: Tan Hai (China)
7 September 2014
20:00

Kuwait	0–3	North Korea
	Report	Han Kwang-song 5' (pen.); Jong Chang-bom 73'; Choe Song-hyok 83'

SCG Stadium, Nonthaburi
Attendance: 130
Referee: Nagor Amir Noor Mohamed (Malaysia)

9 September 2014
16:00

Nepal	2–1	Kuwait
Al-Khaldi 3' (o.g.); Magar 81' (pen.)	Report	Al-Bariki 75' (pen.)

SCG Stadium, Nonthaburi
Attendance: 110
Referee: Kim Dong-jin (South Korea)
9 September 2014
20:00

North Korea	2–3	Uzbekistan
Han Kwang-song 17'; Jong Chang-bom 60'	Report	Nurulloev 40', 59'; Ganijonov 45+2'

SCG Stadium, Nonthaburi
Attendance: 103
Referee: Yuichi Nishimura (Japan)

11 September 2014
16:00

Uzbekistan	4–2	Kuwait
Abramov 9'; Kuchimov 43'; Nurulloev 68'; Kholikov 90+4'	Report	Al Hadiyah 45'; Khaled 45+2'

SCG Stadium, Nonthaburi
Attendance: 200
Referee: Mohanad Qasim Sarray (Iraq)
11 September 2014
16:00

North Korea	4–1	Nepal
Ju Hyon-hyok 4'; Choe Song-hyok 23', 45+1'; Han Kwang-song 27'	Report	Tamang 26'

Rajamangala Stadium, Bangkok
Attendance: 152
Referee: Fahad Jaber Al Marri (Qatar)

=== Group D ===
Team	Pld	W	D	L	GF	GA	GD	Pts
Iran	3	2	0	1	6	5	+1	6
Syria	3	1	2	0	3	2	+1	5
Qatar	3	0	2	1	4	5	−1	2
Saudi Arabia	3	0	2	1	2	3	−1	2

7 September 2014
16:00

Iran	3–2	Qatar
Karimi 22'; Shekari 48', 61'	Report	Palang 4', 59'

Rajamangala Stadium, Bangkok
Attendance: 30
Referee: Kim Dong-jin (South Korea)
7 September 2014
19:00

Syria	0–0	Saudi Arabia
	Report

Rajamangala Stadium, Bangkok
Attendance: 50
Referee: Dmitriy Mashentsev (Kyrgyzstan)

9 September 2014
16:00

Qatar	1–1	Syria
Mazeed 60'	Report	Al-Aji 21'

Rajamangala Stadium, Bangkok
Attendance: 50
Referee: Valentin Kovalenko (Uzbekistan)
9 September 2014
19:00

Saudi Arabia	1–2	Iran
Abdullah 41'	Report	Shamsi 64'; Karimi 65'

Rajamangala Stadium, Bangkok
Attendance: 50
Referee: Nagor Amir Noor Mohamed (Malaysia)

11 September 2014
20:00

Iran	1–2	Syria
Soltanimehr 45+2'	Report	Jaddoua 26'; Naem 40'

SCG Stadium, Nonthaburi
Attendance: 50
Referee: Tan Hai (China)
11 September 2014
20:00

Saudi Arabia	1–1	Qatar
Dubaysh 86'	Report	Palang 90+4'

Rajamangala Stadium, Bangkok
Attendance: 50
Referee: Peter Green (Australia)

== Knockout stage ==
In the knockout stage, penalty shoot-out is used to decide the winner if necessary (extra time is not used).

Quarter-finals
14 September 2014
South Korea	2
Japan	0
14 September 2014
Uzbekistan	2
Syria	5
14 September 2014
Australia	2
Malaysia	1
14 September 2014
Iran	0 (2)
North Korea (p)	0 (4)

Semi-finals
17 September 2014
South Korea	7
Syria	1
17 September 2014
Australia	1 (1)
North Korea (p)	1 (4)

Final
20 September 2014
South Korea	1
North Korea	2

=== Quarter-finals ===
14 September 2014
15:30

South Korea	2–0	Japan
Lee Seung-woo 42', 47'	Report

Rajamangala Stadium, Bangkok
Attendance: 954
Referee: Peter Green (Australia)

14 September 2014
15:30

Australia	2–1	Malaysia
Joice 35'; Maskin 76'	Report	Kogileswaran 31'

SCG Stadium, Nonthaburi
Attendance: 200
Referee: Kim Dong-jin (South Korea)

14 September 2014
20:00

Uzbekistan	2–5	Syria
Mahmudkhojiyev 62', 87' (pen.)	Report	Barakat 16', 30', 48'; Jaddoua 52'; Al-Aji 55'

Rajamangala Stadium, Bangkok
Attendance: 100
Referee: Alireza Faghani (Iran)

14 September 2014
20:00

Iran	0–0	North Korea
	Report
Penalties
Soltanpour (penalty scored); Karimi (penalty scored); Daghestani (penalty missed); Shekari (penalty missed)	2–4	(penalty scored) Han Kwang-song; (penalty scored) Kim Wi-song; (penalty scored) Kim Ye-bom; (penalty scored) Ri Kuk-hyon

SCG Stadium, Nonthaburi
Attendance: 100
Referee: Valentin Kovalenko (Uzbekistan)

=== Semi-finals ===
17 September 2014
16:00

South Korea	7–1	Syria
Jang Gyeol-hee 6', 49'; Lee Seung-woo 47' (pen.); Jang Jae-won 52'; Park Sang-hyeok 57'; Lee Sang-heon 60'; Lee Sang-min 62'	Report	Al-Aji 61'

Rajamangala Stadium, Bangkok
Attendance: 423
Referee: Nagor Amir Noor Mohamed (Malaysia)

17 September 2014
20:00

Australia	1–1	North Korea
Arzani 85'	Report	Pak Yong-gwan 47'
Penalties
Brimmer (penalty missed); Rowles (penalty scored); Bandiera (penalty missed)	1–4	(penalty scored) Kim Wi-song; (penalty scored) Kim Ye-bom; (penalty scored) Ri Kuk-hyon; (penalty scored) Jang Song-il

Rajamangala Stadium, Bangkok
Attendance: 150
Referee: Fahad Jaber Al Marri (Qatar)

=== Final ===
20 September 2014
18:00

South Korea	1–2	North Korea
Choi Jae-young 34'	Report	Han Kwang-song 50'; Choe Song-hyok 67'

Rajamangala Stadium, Bangkok
Attendance: 2,000
Referee: Mohanad Qasim Sarray (Iraq)

== Winners ==
AFC U-16 Championship 2014 winners

North Korea
Second title

== Qualified teams for FIFA U-17 World Cup ==
The following four teams from AFC qualify for the 2015 FIFA U-17 World Cup.

Team	Qualified on	Previous appearances in FIFA U-17 World Cup^{1}
Australia	14 September 2014	11 (1985^{2}, 1987^{2}, 1989^{2}, 1991^{2}, 1993^{2}, 1995^{2}, 1999^{2}, 2001^{2}, 2003^{2}, 2005^{2}, 2011)
North Korea	14 September 2014	3 (2005, 2007, 2011)
South Korea	14 September 2014	4 (1987, 2003, 2007, 2009)
Syria	14 September 2014	1 (2007)

^{1} Bold indicates champions for that year. Italic indicates hosts for that year.
^{2} Australia qualified as a member of the OFC between 1985 and 2005.

== Awards ==
Award	Winner
Top scorer	(South Korea) Lee Seung-woo
MVP	(South Korea) Lee Seung-woo
Fair Play Award	South Korea

== Goalscorers ==
5 goals

- (South Korea) Lee Seung-woo

4 goals

- (Australia) Cameron Joice
- (North Korea) Han Kwang-song
- (Syria) Anas Al-Aji

3 goals

- (North Korea) Choe Song-hyok
- (Qatar) Hassan Palang
- (Syria) Abd Al-Rahman Barakat
- (Uzbekistan) Sukhrob Nurulloev

2 goals

- (Australia) Jake Brimmer
- (Iran) Reza Karimi
- (Iran) Reza Shekari
- (Japan) Suga Daiki
- (North Korea) Jong Chang-bom
- (Malaysia) Najmuddin Samat
- (South Korea) Jang Gyeol-hee
- (Syria) Mohammad Jaddoua
- (Uzbekistan) Jonibek Kuchimov
- (Uzbekistan) Shokhrukh Mahmudkhojiyev

1 goal

- (Australia) Daniel Arzani
- (Australia) Jackson Bandiera
- (Australia) Charlie Devereux
- (Australia) Daniel Maskin
- (Australia) Kosta Petratos
- (Australia) Jamal Reiners
- (China) Duan Liuyu
- (China) He Xin
- (Iran) Mohammad Shamsi
- (Iran) Mohammad Soltanimehr
- (Japan) Ryosuke Nagasawa
- (Japan) Doan Ritsu
- (Japan) Sasaki Takumi
- (Japan) Yasui Takuya
- (Japan) Onozawa Toshiki
- (Kuwait) Salem Al-Bariki
- (Kuwait) Abdulaziz Al-Hadiyah
- (Kuwait) Khaled Mohammad
- (Malaysia) Kogileswaran Raj
- (Malaysia) Syazwan Salihin
- (Nepal) Bimal Magar
- (Nepal) Kiran Sunar
- (Nepal) Ananta Tamang
- (North Korea) Ju Hyon-hyok
- (North Korea) Pak Yong-gwan
- (Oman) Mohammad Al-Ubaidani
- (Oman) Dhakil Al-Yahmadi
- (Qatar) Khalid Mazeed
- (Saudi Arabia) Mashhour Abdullah
- (Saudi Arabia) Khalid Dubaysh
- (South Korea) Choi Jae-young
- (South Korea) Hwang Tae-hyeon
- (South Korea) Jang Jae-won
- (South Korea) Kim Jung-min
- (South Korea) Lee Sang-heon
- (South Korea) Lee Sang-min
- (South Korea) Park Sang-hyeok
- (South Korea) You Ju-an
- (South Korea) Yoo Seung-min
- (Syria) Naeim Naem
- (Thailand) Samart Authairatsamee
- (Uzbekistan) Saveliy Abramov
- (Uzbekistan) Abdugani Ganijonov
- (Uzbekistan) Khudoberdi Kholikov

Own goal

- (Kuwait) Shabaib Al-Khaldi (playing against Nepal)
