= He Xin =

He Xin may refer to:

- He Xin (footballer)
- He Xin (ice hockey)
