= Eun-jin (name) =

- Hangul: 은진
- RR: Eunjin
- MR: Ŭnjin
- IPA: [ɯndʑin]

Eun-jin also spelled Un-jin, is a Korean given name.

== People ==
People with this name include:

- Bang Eun-jin (born 1965), South Korean actress and film director
- Un-Jin Moon (born 1967), Korean American equestrian
- Jang Eun-jin (born 1976), South Korean writer
- Yangpa (born Lee Eun-jin, 1979), South Korean singer
- Shim Eun-jin (born 1981), South Korean singer and actress
- Kang Eun-jin (born 1982), South Korean actress
- Ahn Eun-jin (born 1991), South Korean actress

== See also ==
- List of Korean given names
