= Korean jade carving =

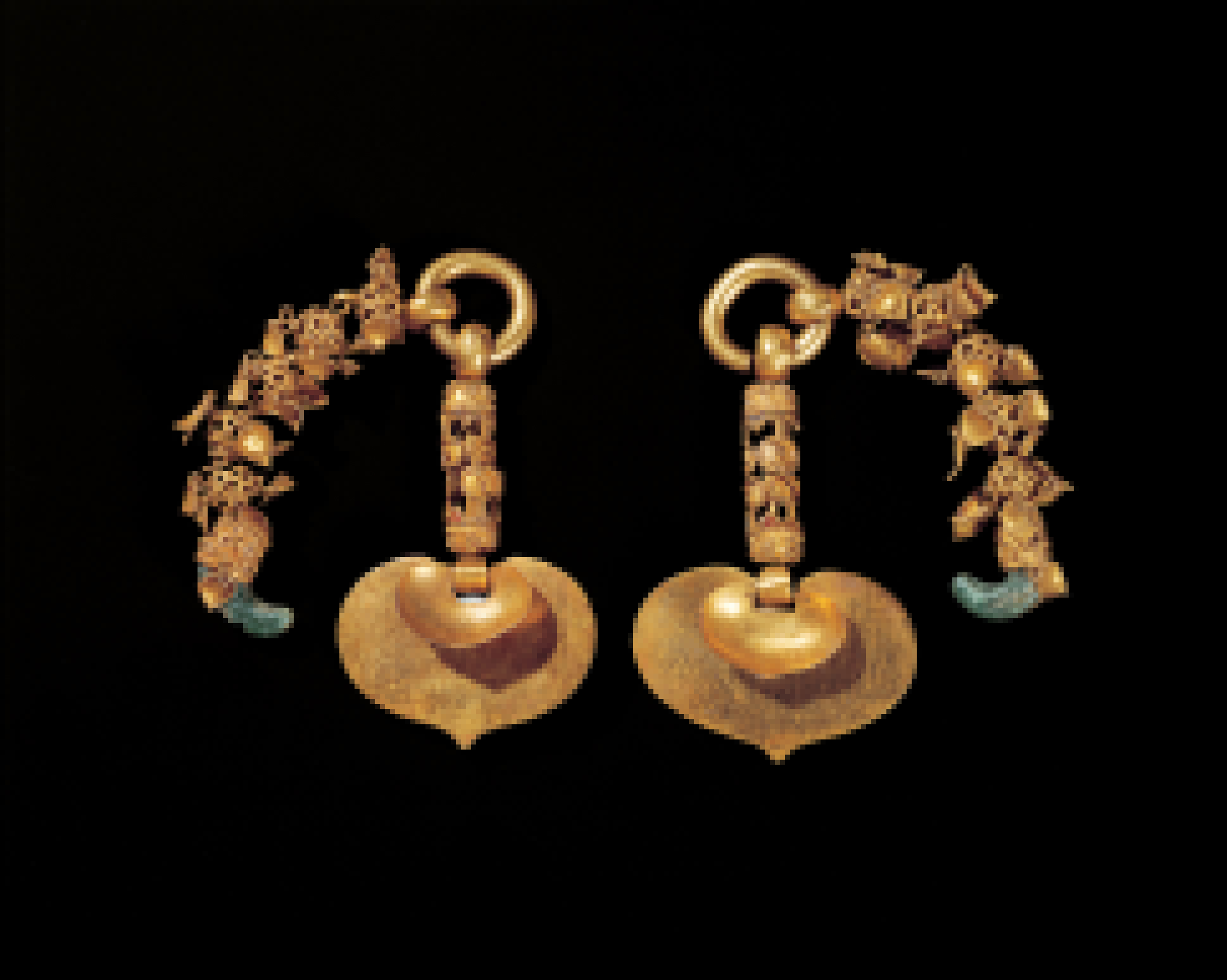
A pair of king's earrings, made from gold and jade, early 6th century (Baekje). From tomb of King Munyeong

The tradition of Korean jade carving dates back to Neolithic finds along the Namgang river basin in Gyeongju. Jade rings and accessories made from both nephrite and jadeite were worn by the higher classes of society, especially women, from the three kingdoms period and reached their peak in the Joseon dynasty, the golden age of jadework. Carved jade artifacts found in Silla dynasty tombs appear to be made from jade originating from Japan and Taiwan, suggested sea trade of jade existed prior to the 5th century AD. Korean jadework often includes Buddhist motifs, cicadas, and small peanut-shaped or comma-shaped good luck talismans (called magatama or gogok), as well as larger-scale architectural pieces. A gold crown featuring 58 hanging jade pendants and a gold girdle with 13 jade pendants were both found in the Silla-era tomb of an unknown king, called Cheonmachong (or 'sky horse tomb'), first excavated in 1973.

== Contemporary jade market ==
In the local markets of Korea there now exists a wide variety of jade carvings and jewelry available for purchase. These items are much less costly than their Chinese counterparts. Mokpo is also the site of master jade carver Jang Ju-won's atelier and exhibit hall.

== See also ==
- Korean art
- Korean culture
