= Reza Karimi (footballer) =

Iranian footballer (born 1998)

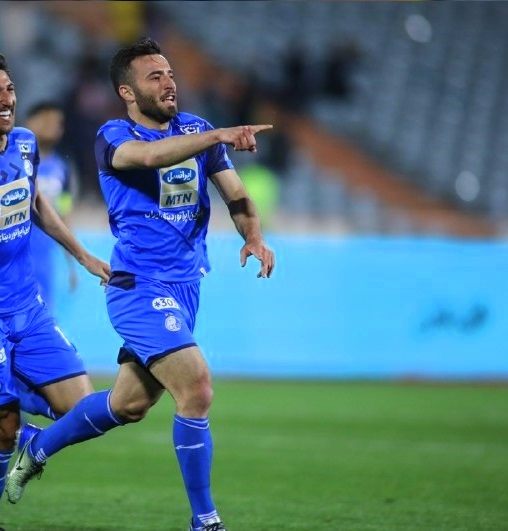
- Reza Karimi

Personal information
- Full name: Reza Habel Karimi
- Date of birth: 23 August 1998 (age 28)
- Place of birth: Ardabil, Iran
- Height: 1.72 m (5 ft 7 1/2 in)
- Position: Forward

Youth career
- 2010–2012: Moghavemat Tehran
- 2012–2014: Shahrdari Ardabil
- 2014–2015: Frenz United

Senior career*
| Years | Team | Apps | (Gls) |
| 2015–2016 | Gostaresh Foolad | 2 | (1) |
| 2016–2018 | Skënderbeu Korçë | 6 | (0) |
| 2017–2018 | → Teuta Durrës (loan) | 11 | (0) |
| 2018–2020 | Esteghlal | 3 | (1) |
| 2020–2021 | Machine Sazi F.C. | 8 | (0) |

International career
| 2012–2014 | Iran U17 | 17 | (12) |
| 2014–2017 | Iran U20 | 9 | (5) |
- * Club domestic league appearances and goals as of 24 September 2021

Reza Karimi (Persian: رضا کریمی, born 23 August 1998) is an Iranian footballer. He primarily plays as a forward.

== Club career ==
=== Early years ===
Reza Karimi started his career with Moghavemat Tehran in 2010 as a youth player.

He moved to the Frenz United youth academy in the summer of 2014. He participated in the Frenz International Cup 2015 in which he gave an excellent performance by scoring 2 magnificent goals against Liverpool and 1 goal against Guangzhou Evergrande.

=== Gostaresh Foolad ===
Reza Karimi moved to Gostaresh Foolad in summer 2015. He made his debut on 7 February 2016 against FC Mashhad, formerly known as Siah Jamegan Khorasan F.C.

On September 10, 2015, he played 90 minutes in the Hazfi Cup match against Razakan and scored in the 41st minute. Gostaresh eventually won 2–0.

=== Skënderbeu Korçë ===
In the summer of 2016 Karimi signed with Albanian champions Skënderbeu Korçë. Karimi had issues with his ITC and was only allowed to play in official matches in January 2017. He made his league debut on 25 February 2017 in a 1–0 victory against Vllaznia.

On 31 May 2017, Karimi came on in the 77th minute of the Albanian Cup Final against KF Tirana. Skënderbeu eventually lost 3–1 in extra time.

=== KF Teuta ===
In September 2017, Karimi was loaned to the Teuta Durrës. He made his league debut on 4 November 2017 in a 1–1 draw against Lachi. In the next tour, he assisted on the first goal in the match against KF Luftëtari and his team won 3–2.

=== Esteghlal Tehran ===
Karimi signed a contract with Esteghlal Tehran in December 2018. He made his league debut on 3 April 2019 in a 0–0 draw against Saipa. On May 1 of the same year, he scored his first goal in the match against Khuzestan's Esteghlal club. In an interview with the press, he commented on this match:

"I am always grateful to Mr. Farhad Majidi. I spent the best night of my life."

On 6 May 2019, Karimi came on in the 83rd minute of the AFC Champions League against Al-Duhail.

=== Machine Sazi ===
Karimi signed a contract with Machine Sazi in August 2021. He made his league debut on 7 October 2020 in a 0–3 loss against Shahr Khodro.

== International career ==
=== Youth ===
Karimi was selected to join Iran under-16 to take part in the 2014 AFC U-16 Championship, under manager Mostafa Ghanbarpour. He made his debut for Iran's opening match against Sri Lanka and scored two goals in Iran's 8–0 victory. He also played in matches against Pakistan and the UAE. In the final round of the tournament, he scored 1 goal in the game with his Qatari peers and was chosen as the man of the match. In the next match against Saudi Arabia, Iran celebrated a 2–1 victory thanks to Karimi's goal, and Karimi was chosen as the man of the match in this match as well. Iran lost to North Korea's 16-year-old national team in a penalty shootout in the quarterfinals. Reza Karimi left the tournament despite a clear penalty kick.

== Personal life ==
In an interview with the press, he said that he is a fan of Cristiano Ronaldo.

== Career statistics ==
=== Club ===
As of 31 December 2021

Appearances and goals by club, season and competition
| Club | Division | Season | League | | Cup | | Continental | | Total | |
| Club | Division | Season | Apps | Goals | Apps | Goals | Apps | Goals | Apps | Goals |
|---|---|---|---|---|---|---|---|---|---|---|
| Gostaresh Foulad | PGPL | 2015–16 | 1 | 0 | 1 | 1 | – | – | 2 | 1 |
| Skënderbeu Korçë | Albanian Superliga | 2016-17 | 6 | 0 | 3 | 0 | – | – | 9 | 0 |
| Teuta Durrës | Albanian Superliga | 2017-18 | 11 | 0 | 2 | 0 | – | – | 13 | 0 |
| Esteghlal Tehran | PGPL | 2018–19 | 2 | 1 | 0 | 0 | 1 | – | 3 | 1 |
| Machine Sazi | PGPL | 2020–21 | 7 | 0 | 1 | 0 | - | – | 8 | 0 |
| Career total | | | 27 | 1 | 7 | 1 | 1 | 0 | 35 | 2 |

=== International ===
As of match played 31 December 2021

Official appearances and goals by national team and year
| National team | Year | Apps | Goals |
|---|---|---|---|
| Iran under-17 | AFC U-16, 2014 | 7 | 4 |
| Iran under-17 | Total | 7 | 4 |

== Honours ==
=== Domestic ===
KF Skënderbeu Korçë

- Runners-up (1): Albanian Cup: 2016–17
