= Jang In-won =

South Korean speed skater

Personal information
- Nationality: South Korean
- Born: 1936 (age 88–89)

Sport
- Sport: Speed skating

Jang In-won (born 1936) is a South Korean speed skater. He competed in three events at the 1960 Winter Olympics.
