= Jang Ju-won =

Korean jade carver

- 장주원
- Born: 1937 (age 88–89); Mokpo, Korea
- Known for: Korean jade carving

Jang Ju-won (Korean: 장주원; born 1937) is a modern-day master of Korean jade carving or jadecraft. In 1996 the Cultural Heritage Administration of the Korean government designated jade carving (Okjang) in South Jeolla Province as Intangible Cultural Heritage No. 100, and named Jang as Korea's designated master craftsman in the art.

Jang was largely self-taught, as there were no books, equipment or teachers available to him when he took up jadecraft in the 1960s. Jang works around 40 per cent using traditional methods, combined with his own techniques and skills such as the "loop chain method"—joining two pieces of jade using a carved chain—and a method of creating a circular hole in jade, a technique which took 30 years to master.

Jang is president of the Korea Important Intangible Cultural Asset Craftsmanship & Arts Association, and was also chair of the Department of Jewelry and Metal Design at Kyonggi University, which awarded him an honorary doctorate in fine arts, and established an exhibition hall in the College of Arts to display his works.

Since 2005, Jang has operated an exhibition hall displaying his work in his hometown of Mokpo.
