= Jang Ok-sun =

- 장옥선

Executive Vice President of Korea Land and Housing Corporation
- In office 5 August 2019 – 29 January 2020
- Preceded by: Yoo Dae-jin
- Succeeded by: Paik Kyung-hoon

Personal details
- Born: 1967 (age 58–59)
- Education: Kangwon National University

Jang Ok-sun (Korean: 장옥선; born 1967) is a South Korean bureaucrat previously served as Korea Land and Housing Corporation (LH)'s Executive Vice President - the first woman to assume this post since creation of LH in 2009 and its preceding agencies in 1962.

Jang has been working for LH for over 29 years since she first joined the corporation in 1988. She has taken numerous roles including director of Office of Housing Welfare, Office of City Planning and Industry Complex Office. When she was the director of Administration Management Office, she was responsible for restructuring the LH under the new policies of President Moon Jae-in.

In January 2018 Jang was appointed member of its board of directors with two-year term becoming the first woman and the youngest to join its board in its history - and led its Administration Innovation Division and Planning and Finance Division. In August 2019, she was promoted to the deputy head of LH.

She holds a bachelor's degree in business studies from Kangwon National University.
