= Chang Wook-jin =

South Korean diplomat

- Hangul: 장욱진
- RR: Jang Ukjin
- MR: Chang Ukchin

Chang Wook-jin is the Deputy Minister for Multilateral and Global Affairs for the South Korean Ministry of Foreign Affairs. Previously, he served as Chief of the NGO Branch within the Department of Economic and Social Affairs (DESA), United Nations, a position he held since March 2022.
