= Chang Young-hee =

South Korean writer

- Hangul: 장영희
- Hanja: 張英嬉
- RR: Jang Yeonghui
- MR: Chang Yŏnghŭi

Jang Yeong-hui (Korean: 장영희; September 14, 1952 – May 9, 2009) was a South Korean professor, scholar, translator, and essayist.

== Biography ==
Chang was born to father Chang Wang-rok (장왕록), a noted scholar of English literature, and mother Yi Gil-ja (이길자) in Seoul in 1952. When she was one year old, she suffered poliomyelitis, which caused paralysis of both legs and right arm.

She read English literature at Sogang University and finished her undergraduate and graduate studies in 1975 and 1977. She received a doctoral degree from State University of New York at Albany in 1985 with the thesis titled Journeys between Real and the Ideal. Since 1985, Chang had worked as a professor at the department of English literature, Sogang University. She wrote columns for The Korea Times and JoongAng Ilbo respectively since 1987 and 2001. Chang also had served as an executive director and editor for the Korea Hawthorne Society since 1995 and the Korea Mark Twain Society since 2003.

After being diagnosed with breast cancer in 2001, Chang had two surgeries and chemotherapy to remove the tumour. However, Chang died of spinal cancer at Yonsei Severance Hospital on May 9, 2009. It was meyastasised from breast cancer after her eight years' struggling against the disease.

== Works ==
=== Authored books ===
- Teaching English (영어교육)
- English Textbooks for Elementary, Middle, and High Schools (초중고 영어교과서)
- Joureys between the Real and the ideal
- Crazy Quilt /Dongmunsa (동문사) / 1971—English Essay
- Only once in my life (내 생애 단 한번), Essay written in Korean (수필집) / 샘터사 /September 2000
- Big Fish (큰물고기)/동아시아/February 15, 2004
- But Love remains (그러나 사랑은 남는것)/샘터/June 30, 2004
- To you with no name (이름없는 너에게)/창비/August 30, 2004
- Song of sad cafe (슬픈 카페의 노래)/열림원/January 15, 2005
- Strolling the Woods of Literature (문학의 숲을 거닐다)/샘터사/March 15, 2005
- Birthday (생일)/April 2006/비채
- Blessing - the biggest blessing in the world is Hope (축복-세상에서 제일 큰 축복은 희망입니다)/July 2006/도서출판 비채
- To you who become twenty years old (스무살이 되는 당신 여자에게)(공저)/February 2007/한겨레출판
- Miracle being lived and to live (살아온 기적 살아갈 기적)(샘터)

*The titles of the above books were literally translated. Not official English titles.

=== Translations by Chang ===
- Jongi sigye (종이시계)/Dongmunsa (동문사), 1991
- Gone with the Wind (바람과 함께 사라지다,공역)
- Scarlet 스칼렛(공역)/교원문고/1993
- 살아있는 갈대(공역)/동문사/1996
- 바너비 스토리(역)/프레스21/2001.04.01
- 백년자작나무 숲에 살자(역)/2004
- 피터팬(역)/비룡소/2004.01.30
- 세상을 다 가져라(역)/이레/2004.02.10

== Thesis ==
- Disability as Metaphor in American Literature (은유로서의 신체장애: 미국문학의 경우) (July, 2001) (in Korean), The American Studies Association of Korea
- Still on the Trail: Emerson, Thoreau, and Failure of Transcendentalism, (December, 2002), Korea Hawthorne Society
- The City as Psyche in The Scarlet Letter and Sister Carrie, (May, 2003) Korea Hawthorne Society, The American Fiction Association of Korea
- Huckleberry Finns Dual Vision:A Journey towards Ishmaelian Equal Eye, The Korean Society Of British And American Fiction 근대영미소설학회/2003.10
- Korean Sources & References in Jack Londons, (December, 2003), The Star Rover, The American Studies Association of Korea

== Awards ==
- 1981 Korean literature translation prize, award hosted by Hankook Ilbo
- March, 2002, This year's writing, awarded by National Cultural Movement Headquarters올해의 문장상/국민문화운동본부
- December, 2005 the 10th Proud Sogang alumni award by Sogang University Alumni Association
