= Jang Jung-hyuk =

North Korean defector MMA fighter

- Born: Jang Jung-hyuk; 1997 (age 28–29); North Hamgyong Province, North Korea
- Other names: Jang Jung-hyuck
- Occupations: MMA fighter; Martial arts fighter; Human rights activist
- Years active: 2018 - present

Jang Jung-hyuk (Korean: 장정혁; born 1997) is a North Korea defector and professional mixed martial arts (MMA) fighter based in South Korea, where he is now a citizen. Known by the nickname "North Korean Defector Fighter," he competes in the lightweight and welterweight divisions and has become a prominent public figure through his advocacy for North Korean human rights.

== Early life and defection ==
Jang was born in a remote mountain village in North Hamgyeong Province during the height of the "Arduous March" famine. His early childhood was marked by severe hunger and the absence of his father, who his mother left shortly after Jang's birth due to domestic abuse.

At a young age, Jang and his mother fled to China to escape starvation. For several years, they lived as undocumented migrants, during which time Jang was subjected to forced labor at construction sites and chicken farms. He frequently worked without pay and lived in constant fear of repatriation before eventually reaching South Korea as a teenager.

== Career ==
=== Mixed Martial Arts ===
Jang began training in martial arts at age 18 in Seoul, initially as a way to cope with psychological trauma. He made his professional debut in March 2018. Jang made his professional debut in March 2018 at TFC Dream 5, where he secured a technical knockout (TKO) victory against Japanese fighter Yamato Nishikawa.

In July 2024, Jang reached a career peak by capturing the welterweight title in the Japanese organization A-Toys Challenge Fight (ACF). He also holds a South Korean kickboxing title. His professional MMA record stands at 6 wins, 5 losses, and 3 draws. His most recent recorded about was a decision loss against Hyun Bin-park at Fighter100 - Club 002 on November 29, 2024.

== Personal life ==
In late 2025, Jang announced the opening of his own MMA gym in Seoul, aiming to provide a training space for aspiring athletes and fellow defectors. He often speaks about the "freedom with responsibility" he found in South Korea, contrasting it with the "dictatorship and pain" of his early life.

== Mixed Martial Arts Record ==
No.	Result	Record	Opponent	Method	Event	Date
4	Loss	6–4–3	Hyun Bin-park	Decision (Unanimous)	Fighter100 - Club 002	Nov 29, 2024
3	Win	6–3–3	Hwan Sung-lee	TKO (Body kick & punches)	Black Combat - CL 24-25	Oct 19, 2024
2	Win	5–3–3	Young Je-jung	Decision (Unanimous)	Black Combat - Rise 3	Jun 22, 2024
1	Draw	4–3–3	Walter Luna	Draw	ACF 100th	Mar 20, 2024

== Media and Public Image ==
Jang has leveraged his unique background to become a public figure in South Korea, frequently appearing in combat sports media and reality television. He gained significant fame through his participation in the popular YouTube-based promotion Black Combat, where he served as a central figure in multiple "RISE" events through 2024.

Beyond the ring, Jang is an active YouTuber and has expressed deep commitment to North Korean human rights activism. He has stated that his goal is to prove that defectors can not only survive but excel in South Korean society.
