= Jang Mi-ja =

South Korean actress (1941–2025)

- 장미자
- Jang on a talk show in November 2012
- Born: February 3, 1941; Gimpo, Korea, Empire of Japan
- Died: January 27, 2025 (aged 83); Seoul National University Hospital, Seoul, South Korea
- Spouse: Park Woong (m. 1968)
- Children: 2

Jang Mi-ja (Korean: 장미자; Hanja: 張美子; February 3, 1941 – January 27, 2025) was a South Korean actress and voice actor. Beginning her career in around 1959, she debuted in the play Without the Pain of Breaking the Shell in 1962 and joined DBS Dong-A Broadcasting (which was later merged into the sixth public recruitment of KBS) as a part of their first generation of voice actors in 1963. In 1981, she began her screen career in the movie "Ban Geum-ryeon". She was nicknamed "The Nation's Mother-in-Law" after her portrayal of a mother-in-law in the drama The Clinic for Married Couples: Love and War.

Jang was also known for her extensive contributions to theater. She was a member of the Theater Actors' Association and led the theater company Samgaksan. Her stage performances included plays such as One Flew Over the Cuckoo's Nest, Drying Peppers, Golden Pond, and Human Time.

In addition to her stage work, Jang appeared in several well-known television dramas such as Dalmuri, Land, The Second Republic, The Sons of Sol Pharmacy House, Believe in Love, and The Light in Your Eyes. In 2023, she appeared in the JTBC drama King the Land, in what would become one of her final screen roles.

Jang was married to Park Woong, a fellow voice actor and actor. The couple frequently collaborated on stage productions, notably performing together in the play Dancing Silver Portrait in 2024. They had two sons; Park Kang and Park Joon. Their second son, Park Joon, has pursued a career in acting.

Jang died on January 27, 2025 at the Seoul National University Hospital due to a chronic illness. Her funeral was held on January 29, 2025, at the Seoul City Cemetery.

== Filmography ==
=== Dramas ===
Broadcasting company	Year	Name of drama
KBS	1981	Dalmuri
KBS2	1982	Match Made in Heaven
KBS	1983	The Foundation
KBS	1984	Dongnimmun
KBS1	1987	Land
MBC	1989	The Second Republic
MBC	1989	500 Years of Joseon
KBS1	1990	Seoul Ddukbaegi
KBS2	1990	TV's The Art of War
KBS1	1992	Your Name is Hyo-ja
SBS	1992	A Love Without Fear
KBS1	1996	New Generation Report: Adults Don't Know
KBS	2000	Commi Fairy
KBS	2000	The Clinic for Married Couples: Love and War
MBC	2002	Man in Crisis
KBS2	2009	My Too Perfect Sons
KBS2	2011	My Love, My Family
JTBC	2019	The Light in Your Eyes
JTBC	2023	King the Land

=== Film ===
Year	Name of film
1981	Ban Geum-ryeon
2012	Confession of Murder
