= Jang Gyeol-hee =

Korean footballer (born 1998)

Jang Gyeol hee
Personal information
- Date of birth: 4 April 1998 (age 28)
- Place of birth: Seongbuk District, Seoul, South Korea
- Height: 1.70 m (5 ft 7 in)
- Position: Forward

Youth career
- 2011: Pohang Steelers
- 2011–2017: Barcelona
- 2017–2018: Asteras Tripolis

Senior career*
Years	Team	Apps	(Gls)
2018–2019	Pohang Steelers	0	(0)
2021	Pyeongtaek Citizen	9	(0)
2022	Seoul Jungnang	2	(0)
2022	Anseong Citizen		

International career
- South Korea U16
2017	South Korea U20	1	(0)
- * Club domestic league appearances and goals

- Jang Gyeol-hee
- Hangul: 장결희
- RR: Jang Gyeolhui
- MR: Chang Kyŏrhŭi

Jang Gyeol-hee (Korean: 장결희; born 4 April 1998) is a South Korean former footballer who played as a forward.

== Club career ==
Born in Seoul, Jang began his career with Pohang Steelers, before joining Spanish side Barcelona in 2011, following similar deals for compatriots Lee Seung-woo and Paik Seung-ho. These deals, along with multiple others, would cause Barcelona to be sanctioned by international body FIFA in 2014, for breach of their rules regarding recruitment of youth players. Due to this, Jang was banned for three years, and briefly moved back to South Korea, along with Lee, to train with K League 2 side Suwon FC.

In the summer of 2017, having failed to achieve promotion to Barcelona's B squad, he was released. He was approached by numerous Japanese sides, but decided to stay in Europe, signing with Greek side Asteras Tripolis in July 2017. After failing to break into the first team at Asteras Tripolis, he returned to South Korea in 2018 to sign for Pohang Steelers, but was unable to play until 2019 due to issues with his registration.

Having left Pohang Steelers at the end of 2019, a proposed deal to join K3 League side Yangju Citizen collapsed in 2020. In February of the following year, he signed with Pyeongtaek Citizen. Despite being a relatively bright player in Pyeongtaek Citizen's 8–0 Korean FA Cup loss to Gimcheon Sangmu, he only managed a total of eleven appearances in 2021, scoring once.

The following year, he played for both Seoul Jungnang and Anseong Citizen.

== International career ==
Jang represented South Korea at U-16 and under-20 level. He was set to play in the 2015 FIFA U-17 World Cup, but missed out due to an ankle injury.

== Coaching career ==
Having left Pyeongtaek Citizen at the end of 2021, Jang went into youth football coaching. His first role was managing a youth team in Pyeongtaek. He continued this endeavour after leaving Seoul Jungnang in 2022.

== Career statistics ==
=== Club ===
Club	Season	League			Cup		Other		Total	
Club	Season	Division	Apps	Goals	Apps	Goals	Apps	Goals	Apps	Goals
Pohang Steelers	2018	K League 1	0	0	0	0	0	0	0	0
Pohang Steelers	2019	K League 1	0	0	0	0	0	0	0	0
Pohang Steelers	Total		0	0	0	0	0	0	0	0
Pyeongtaek Citizen	2021	K3 League	9	0	2 (Note: Appearances in the Korean FA Cup)	1	0	0	11	1
Seoul Jungnang	2022	K4 League	2	0	0	0	0	0	2	0
Career total			11	0	2	1	0	0	13	1
