= Chang Pyung-soon =

South Korean businessman (born 1951)

- Born: 1951 (age 74–75); Dangjin, South Korea
- Education: Yonsei University
- Occupation: Businessman
- Employer: Kyowon Group

Korean name
- Hangul: 장평순
- Hanja: 張平淳
- RR: Jang Pyeongsun
- MR: Chang P'yŏngsun

Chang Pyung-soon (Korean: 장평순; born 1951) is a South Korean businessman. The founder and chairman of Kyowon Group, he is among the richest people in South Korea. In April 2024, Forbes estimated his net worth at US$1 billion and ranked him 41st richest in the country.

== Biography ==
Chang was born in 1951 in Dangjin, South Korea as the eldest son of seven children. He grew up in poverty. His parents left to work in Incheon, and left him in the care of his grandparents until he was five. His poverty was so significant that he became malnourished; he had to be given intravenous injections several times.

He turned to studying in an effort to escape poverty. He graduated from Incheon High School in 1968, and entered Yonsei University. He attempted to become a civil servant, but failed the exam. He then became a successful cabbage salesman. He came to enjoy being a salesman; he described himself as a natural in that role.

In 1985, he founded a company (Korean name 중앙교육연구원) that eventually developed into Kyowon Group. He focused the company on selling educational books. The company grew rapidly into the 1990s and became dominant in that field. In 2000, he began expanding the business by purchasing real estate and building hotels. He continued establishing companies in various industries from then.

== Personal life ==
He has one son and one daughter. He claims to be introverted, and reportedly enjoys fishing and the game baduk.
