= Jang Gil-su =

North Korean defector (born 1984)

- Hangul: 장길수
- RR: Jang Gilsu
- MR: Chang Kilsu

Jang Gil-su (Korean: 장길수; born 1984) is a North Korean defector who fled North Korea in 1999 at age 15.

== Defection ==
In January 1999, Jang Gil-su and his family, living in Hoeryeong, North Hamgyeong Province, crossed the Tumen River into China. They lived in China with the help of some ethnic Koreans in China and South Korean activist groups. During this time, he had to avoid Chinese surveillance and had to beg for food. Later, Jang returned twice to North Korea, risking arrest and execution, to smuggle out more of his relatives. In March 2000, Jang Gil-su's mother, Chung Sun-mi, was repatriated and handed over to the North Korean State Security Agency. On June 26, 2001, after storming the office of the United Nations High Commissioner for Refugees, Jang and few of his relatives were permitted to stay in the office of the UNHCR in Beijing. He requested to be sent to South Korea, and on June 30 of that same year, he arrived in South Korea via Manila.

== Life after defection ==
In 2004, Jang Gil-su graduated from high school three years from the time he first arrived in South Korea. Once in college, he planned on majoring in North Korean studies. He chose North Korean studies because it is an area he knows most about, and he felt he needed to do something for those trapped in North Korea; in particular, his parents.

In a letter sent to South Korean Ambassador to the United States, Yang Sung-chul, on August 13, 2002, Senator Sam Brownback, supported by Senator Edward Kennedy, invited teenage defector Jang Kil-soo and his family to a photograph exhibition and reception in their honor to be held in the U.S. Capitol Rotunda in early September, and the senators urged the South Korean government to allow Jang to visit it.

== Memoir ==
Jang's memoir, 눈물로 그린 무지개, or The Rainbow I Painted With My Tears: A refugee boy's story in his own words and drawings, was published by Moonhak Soochop (Seoul). It was also published in Japan (ISBN 9784833131308).

His story is told in English (and illustrated by Gil Su) through a book, Out of North Korea.

== See also ==
- North Korean defectors
