= Chang Hyo-hui =

- Hangul: 장효희
- Hanja: 張孝熙
- RR: Jang Hyohui
- MR: Chang Hyohŭi

Chang Hyo-hui (장효희 張孝熙, 1948 – December 2, 2003) was a South Korean Protestant pastor, social activist, theologian, and philosopher. He served as president of the Representative Council of the Presbyterian Church, chairman of the Christian Council of Incheon, and co-chairman of the Christian Council.

He held the degrees of Bachelor of Theology from the Linda Vista Theological Seminary of San Diego, Master of Theology from Yonsei University and Cheonan University, and Doctor of Philosophy from the California Graduate School of Theology.

On December 1, 2003, he was with a congregation member's wife at her 9th-floor apartment in Incheon when her husband came home; Chang crawled out onto the ledge in an attempt to hide, but fell down to his death.

== Work book ==
- discipleship expression de James (야고보식 제자 훈련)
- The grace of God (하나님의 은혜)
- Kgolmangtae (꼴망태)
