= Hwang Tae-hyeon =

South Korean footballer (born 1999)

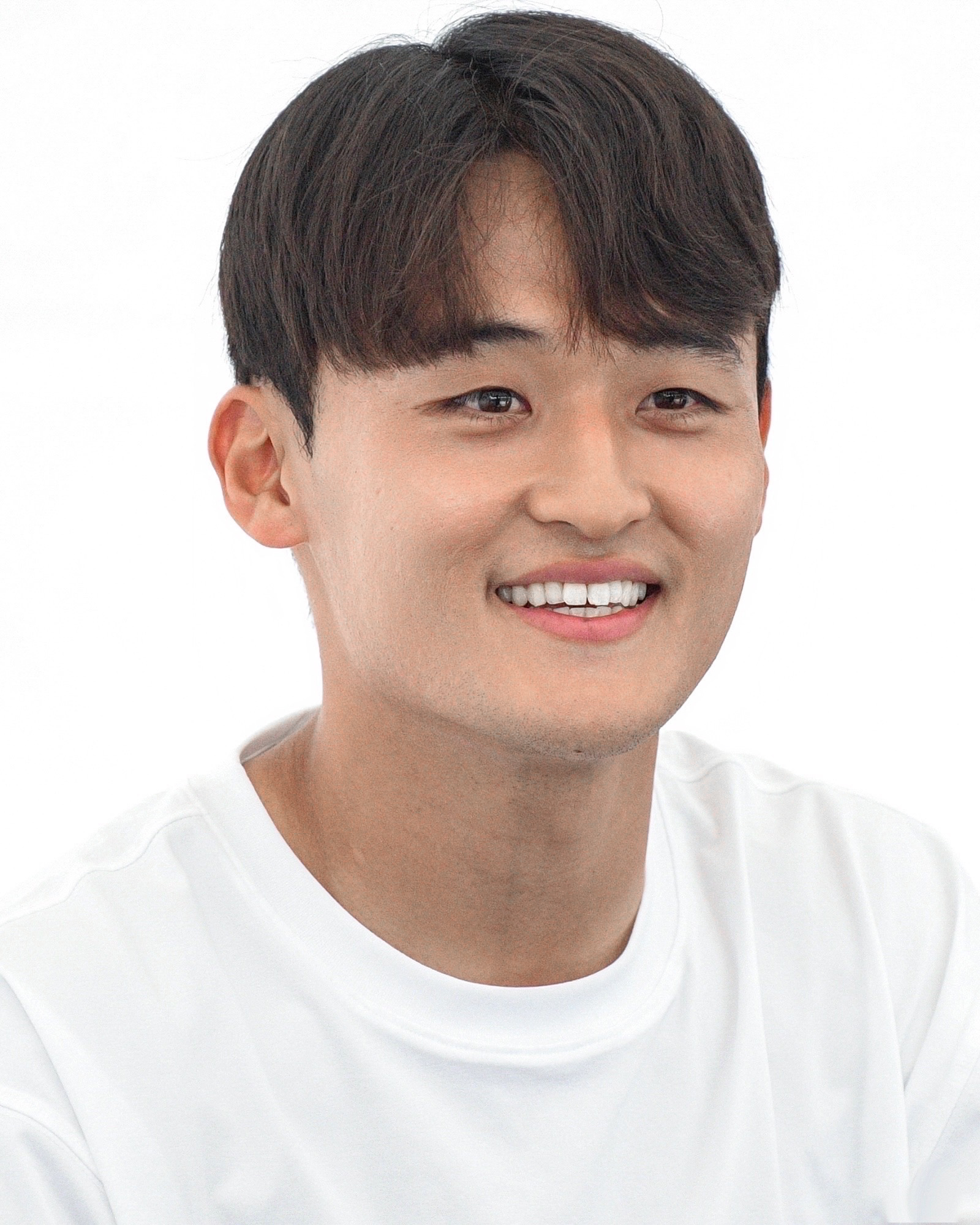
- Hwang in 2024

Personal information
- Date of birth: 29 January 1999 (age 27)
- Place of birth: South Korea
- Height: 1.80 m (5 ft 11 in)
- Positions: Right-back; defensive midfielder

Team information
- Current team: Seoul E-Land
- Number: 2

Youth career
- 2014–2016: Gwangyang Jecheol High School
- 2017: Chung-Ang University

Senior career*
Years	Team	Apps	(Gls)
2018–2019	Ansan Greeners	20	(0)
2020	Daegu FC	4	(0)
2021–	Seoul E-Land	61	(3)

International career^{‡}
2014–2016	South Korea U17	14	(2)
2017–2019	South Korea U20	16	(0)
Medal record
Men's football
Representing South Korea
FIFA U-20 World Cup
Runner-up	2019 Poland
- * Club domestic league appearances and goals as of 20 February 2022 ‡ National team caps and goals as of 3 November 2018

- Hwang Tae-hyeon
- Hangul: 황태현
- Hanja: 黄泰賢
- RR: Hwang Taehyeon
- MR: Hwang T'aehyŏn

Hwang Tae-hyeon (Korean: 황태현; born 29 January 1999) is a South Korean footballer who plays as a right-back or a defensive midfielder for Seoul E-Land.

== Career statistics ==
=== Club ===
As of 20 February 2022

Club performance			League		Cup		Continental		Total	
Season	Club	League	Apps	Goals	Apps	Goals	Apps	Goals	Apps	Goals
South Korea			League		KFA Cup		Asia		Total	
2018	Ansan Greeners	K League 2	2	0	0	0	—		2	0
2019	Ansan Greeners	K League 2	18	0	0	0	—		18	1
2020	Daegu FC	K League 1	4	0	0	0	—		4	0
2021	Seoul E-Land	K League 2	20	1	0	0	—		20	1
2022	Seoul E-Land	K League 2	1	0	0	0	—		1	0
Country	South Korea		45	1	0	0	0	0	45	1
Career total			45	1	0	0	0	0	45	1

== Honours ==
=== International ===
==== South Korea U20 ====
- FIFA U-20 World Cup runner-up: 2019
