= Lee Seung-woo =

South Korean footballer (born 1998)

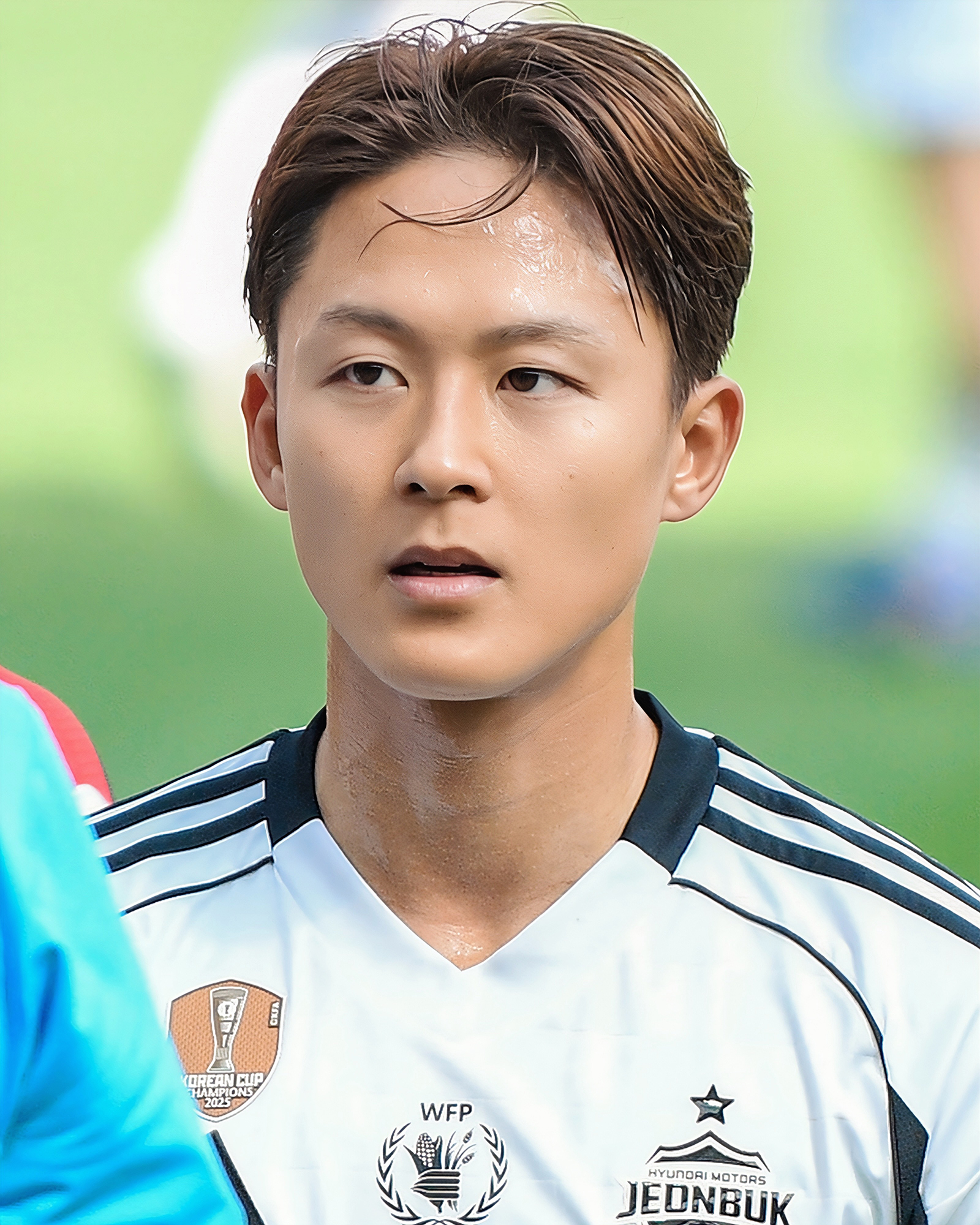
- Lee with Jeonbuk Hyundai Motors in 2026

Personal information
- Full name: Lee Seung-woo
- Date of birth: 6 January 1998 (age 28)
- Place of birth: Suwon, Gyeonggi, South Korea
- Height: 1.70 m (5 ft 7 in)
- Positions: Winger; attacking midfielder

Team information
- Current team: Jeonbuk Hyundai Motors
- Number: 10

Youth career
- 2010–2011: Kwangsung Middle School
- 2011–2016: Barcelona

Senior career*
Years	Team	Apps	(Gls)
2016–2017	Barcelona B	1	(0)
2017–2019	Hellas Verona	37	(2)
2019–2021	Sint-Truiden	17	(2)
2021	→ Portimonense (loan)	4	(0)
2022–2024	Suwon FC	88	(34)
2024–	Jeonbuk Hyundai Motors	72	(14)

International career^{‡}
2013–2015	South Korea U17	18	(13)
2015–2017	South Korea U20	16	(7)
2018–2021	South Korea U23	10	(4)
2018–	South Korea	12	(0)
Medal record
Representing South Korea
Men's football
Asian Games
Gold medal – first place	2018 Jakarta-Palembang	Team
AFC U-16 Championship
Silver medal – second place	2014 Thailand	Team
- * Club domestic league appearances and goals as of 21 November 2026 ‡ National team caps and goals as of 15 October 2024

- Lee Seung-woo
- Hangul: 이승우
- Hanja: 李昇祐
- RR: I Seungu
- MR: I Sŭngu

Lee Seung-woo (Korean: 이승우; born 6 January 1998) is a South Korean footballer who plays as a left winger for Jeonbuk Hyundai Motors and the South Korea national team.

== Early life ==
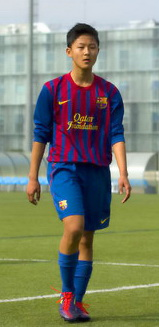
Lee in 2012

Aged 12, Lee caught the attention of FC Barcelona after he finished as the top scorer in the 2010 Danone Nations Cup, one of the most prestigious youth football tournaments. He joined Barcelona's youth academy, La Masia, and scored 39 goals in 29 appearances during his first season. He was also named the best player in four youth tournaments: Torneo Canillas, Memorial Gaetano Scirea, Trofeo San Bonifacio, and Gabala Cup. He was nicknamed the "Korean Messi" after showing his talent.

However, he was banned from playing in the regular season for three years until his 18th birthday by transfer regulations of FIFA. On 13 March 2016, he made his senior debut for the B team.

== Club career ==
=== Hellas Verona ===
On 31 August 2017, Lee joined Serie A club Hellas Verona on a four-year deal, for a fee of €1.5 million. Barcelona retained the option to repurchase him until 2019 for an undisclosed fee.

On 24 September, he made his Serie A debut for Verona in the second half of the game against Lazio. On 6 May 2018, he scored his first Serie A goal in an away match against Milan, but his team lost 4–1.

Verona was relegated to the Serie B by finishing the league in 19th place. He scored one goal and provided two assists during 27 appearances in the 2018–19 Serie B. Verona was promoted to the Serie A by winning the promotion play-offs, but he was excluded from Verona's plan for the next season.

=== Sint-Truiden ===
On 30 August 2019, Lee joined Belgian First Division A side Sint-Truiden. He was excluded from the list of the squad for twelve consecutive matches, and this situation caused much controversy in South Korea. His name was on the list for the first time against Genk on 29 November, and he made his Belgian league debut against Waasland-Beveren on 26 December. He finished his first season due to early termination of the Belgian league caused by the COVID-19 pandemic after making only four appearances.

On 13 September 2020, he scored his second and third goal for Sint-Truiden against Royal Antwerp, but his team lost 3–2 despite his two goals. However, he failed to score in six games where he played as a starter excluding a game against Antwerp, and his team also did not get a victory at the same time. When he was being excluded from the squad again, some South Korean journalists recommended playing in South Korea to him.

On 1 February 2021, Lee joined Primeira Liga side Portimonense on a six-month loan deal with an option to buy. He had difficulty in leaving special impression on the new club. He left Portimonense after the end of his contract.

=== Suwon FC ===
In December 2021, Lee returned to his hometown of Suwon, signing with K League 1 side Suwon FC on a multi-year deal.

Lee still showed weak physical strength, pace and defensive skills, which had been followed by his failure in Italy and Belgium, but his accurate shots and momentary movements stood out in South Korea. In his first K League 1 season, he became the third highest scorer without a penalty, and was selected as one of the four best left wingers, who were nominated for the K League Best XI.

In his second season, Lee struggled somewhat due to his weaknesses grasped by opponents, but helped Suwon avoid relegation by scoring the most goals among team members. He received an offer from Serie A club Frosinone in the middle of the season, but was more cautious about his challenge in Europe after the hardship at Sint-Truiden.

For the first half of the 2024 season, his third season at Suwon, Lee dominated the league and already reached double-digit goals. Another club in the same league, Jeonbuk Hyundai Motors, offered him the league's highest salary in the summer transfer window.

=== Jeonbuk Hyundai Motors ===
On 24 July 2024, Lee joined Jeonbuk Hyundai Motors on a four-and-a-half year deal. Unlike Suwon, Jeonbuk did not plan tactics centered on Lee. His influence sharply decreased at the new club, and he played as a starter in only two matches for half a year.

Lee still played as a substitute after Gus Poyet was appointed the new manager the next year, but became a champion at the K League 1 and the Korea Cup. In the 2025 Korea Cup final against Gwangju FC on 6 December, which ended in a 2–1 win, he scored the winning goal before being sent off for an unsportsmanlike foul.

== International career ==
Lee made his international debut as a part of the South Korea under-16 team in the 2014 AFC U-16 Championship qualification. He scored four goals in a qualifier against Laos.

In the 2014 AFC U-16 Championship, he showed overwhelming performances, leading South Korea to the final. He scored winning goals against Malaysia and Thailand in the group stage. Afterwards, in the quarter-finals, he scored all two goals in a 2–0 win over Japan, and left a memorable scene. He destroyed Japan's defense by dribbling for about 50 meters, scoring his second goal. In the semi-finals against Syria, he recorded one goal and four assists. He became the tournament's best player and top goalscorer, although his team lost the final to North Korea.

Lee played for South Korea in the 2015 FIFA U-17 World Cup, but he missed a crucial penalty against Belgium. South Korea lost to Belgium in the round of 16.

Lee participated in the 2017 FIFA U-20 World Cup hosted by South Korea. He scored the winning goal and provided one assist in the first group match against Guinea. He scored the opening goal after dribbling alone for 40 meters in the second match against Argentina. South Korea was eliminated by a loss to Portugal in the round of 16.

In a friendly against Honduras just before the 2018 FIFA World Cup, Lee made his senior international debut and showed impressive performance including an assist. He was selected for the World Cup team, playing two World Cup matches as a substitute.

Lee was named in the South Korea under-23 squad for the 2018 Asian Games in Jakarta-Palembang. In the round of 16 against Iran, he scored his first goal of the tournament. In the semi-finals against Vietnam, he led South Korea to a 3–1 victory with two goals and one assist. In extra time of the final, he scored the crucial opening goal, contributing to a 2–1 victory over Japan. He won a gold medal after the final.

Lee was selected to the Korean national team roster for the 2026 World Cup qualifiers in October 2024 and returned to the national team after 5 years and 4 months. Lee was selected as a replacement due to injuries to Hwang Hee-chan and Eom Ji-sung. He needed to join the training urgently, so he arrived at the training using standing room on the train.

== Career statistics ==
=== Club ===
As of match played 21 November 2026

Appearances and goals by club, season and competition
Club	Season	League			Cup		Continental		Other		Total	
Club	Season	Division	Apps	Goals	Apps	Goals	Apps	Goals	Apps	Goals	Apps	Goals
Barcelona B	2015–16	Segunda División B	1	0	—		—		—		1	0
Barcelona B	2016–17	Segunda División B	0	0	—		—		—		0	0
Barcelona B	Total		1	0	—		—		—		1	0
Hellas Verona	2017–18	Serie A	14	1	2	0	—		—		16	1
Hellas Verona	2018–19	Serie B	23	1	1	0	—		3 (Note: Appearances in Serie B Promotion play-offs)	0	27	1
Hellas Verona	Total		37	2	3	0	—		3	0	43	2
Sint-Truiden	2019–20	Belgian First Division A	4	0	0	0	—		—		4	0
Sint-Truiden	2020–21	Belgian First Division A	13	2	0	0	—		—		13	2
Sint-Truiden	Total		17	2	0	0	—		—		17	2
Portimonense (loan)	2020–21	Primeira Liga	4	0	—		—		—		4	0
Suwon FC	2022	K League 1	35	14	0	0	—		—		35	14
Suwon FC	2023	K League 1	35	10	0	0	—		1 (Note: Appearance in K League promotion-relegation play-offs)	0	36	10
Suwon FC	2024	K League 1	18	10	0	0	—		—		18	10
Suwon FC	Total		88	34	0	0	—		1	0	89	34
Jeonbuk Hyundai Motors	2024	K League 1	12	2	0	0	2 (Note: Appearances in AFC Champions League Two)	1	1	0	15	3
Jeonbuk Hyundai Motors	2025	K League 1	25	4	6	1	2	0	—		33	5
Jeonbuk Hyundai Motors	2026	K League 1	35	8	0	0	4 (Note: Appearance in AFC Champions League Elite)	0	1 (Note: Appearance in K League Super Cup)	0	40	8
Jeonbuk Hyundai Motors	Total		72	14	6	1	8	1	2	0	88	16
Career total			219	52	9	1	8	1	6	0	242	54

=== International ===
As of 15 October 2024

Appearances and goals by national team and year
National team	Year	Apps	Goals
South Korea	2018	7	0
South Korea	2019	4	0
South Korea	2024	1	0
Career total		12	0

== Honours ==
South Korea U17

- AFC U-16 Championship runner-up: 2014

South Korea U23

- Asian Games: 2018

Jeonbuk Hyundai Motors

- K League 1: 2025
- Korea Cup: 2025
- K League Super Cup: 2026

Individual

- AFC U-16 Championship Most Valuable Player: 2014
- AFC U-16 Championship top goalscorer: 2014
- AFC Youth Player of the Year: 2017
- Korean FA Goal of the Year: 2017
- K League All-Star: 2022, 2023, 2024, 2026
- K League Player of the Month: June 2022, August 2023, May 2024
- K League Goal of the Month: June 2022, March 2024
