= Chang Wang-rok =

South Korean literary scholar (1924–1994)

- Born: February 29, 1924; Seohwa-myeon, Ryonggang-gun, Korea, Empire of Japan
- Died: July 17, 1994 (aged 70); Sokcho, Gangwon Province, South Korea
- Resting place: Cheonan Memorial Foundation, Cheonan
- Education: Seoul National University, University of Iowa
- Occupations: Professor, Translator, Literary Scholar
- Spouse: Lee Gilja
- Children: Chang Young-hee
- Writing career
- Language: Korean

Korean name
- Hangul: 장왕록
- Hanja: 張旺祿
- RR: Jang Wangrok
- MR: Chang Wangnok

Art name
- Hangul: 우보
- Hanja: 又步
- RR: Ubo
- MR: Ubo

Chang Wang-rok (Korean: 장왕록; 29 February 1924 – 17 July 1994) was a South Korean literary scholar, professor, novelist, a founding figure in translation, and critique of English literature. Also known by his art name Woobo (Korean: 우보; Hanja: 又步), his works contributed to the introduction of American literature in South Korean academy. His oeuvre includes more than 60 translations of canonical literary texts, such as The Good Earth by Pearl Buck, Absalom, Absalom! by William Faulkner, and Gone with the Wind by Margaret Mitchell, and bridged the pathway between modern American novelists and Korean readers. In 1984, Compilation of Articles Dedicated to Chang Wang-rok (우보장왕록박사회갑기념논문집) was published, a monumental piece consisting of 1,297 pages and 80 articles on English literature, to commemorate his career.

== Biography ==
=== Personal life ===
Chang was born on February 29, 1924, in Yonggang-dong, Pyeongannam-do as the third son of the family. He learned Hanhak (漢學) as a child, which influenced his later translations of Pearl S. Buck's works. He received secondary education in Pyongyang Jae-II Middle School (평양제2중학교).

In 1943, Chang entered Keijō Imperial University (경성제국대학) as a humanities major and enrolled in its English literature degree program. After Korea's independence, he continued his study and completed the course at Seoul National University in 1948. He proceeded to earn his master's degree from the same university in 1950, becoming the first person in Korea to write a master's thesis on English literature.

After graduating, Chang worked as a manager in the Translation and Interpretation department of the Far East Air Force (United States) (미극동공군) for three years. He returned to school when he was hired as a lecturer at Seoul National University in 1953. During this period, he was also recruited as a teacher by Ewha Women's High School.

He became an assistant professor in the education department at Seoul National University in 1955, but soon left school temporarily to study in the United States. In 1958, he received an MA in literature from the University of Iowa. Upon return, Chang continued his career as a professor while pursuing further studies. In February 1974, he received a Ph.D. in literature from Seoul National University and began teaching papers and courses in literature. After 35 years in Seoul National University, he retired in 1989.

After his retirement, he was invited to and joined Hanlim University as a professor emeritus in English literature.

=== Career ===
Chang worked to promote the study of 19th-century American novelists, particularly Nathaniel Hawthorne, Mark Twain, and Henry James. In addition to producing extensive publications on the topic, Chang pursued further to create grounds for academic discussions, organizing and attaining multiple roles in English literature associations. He served as the vice president, and the president, of the English Language and Literature Association of Korea (한국영어영문학회) in 1975 and 1977. He was also the founder and president of the Hawthorne Association of Korea (한국호손학회), which would later be the American Fiction Association of Korea (미국소설학회). He then established The Mark Twain Circle of Korea (한국마크트웨인학회) in 1989 with Cho Seounggyu and Park Yeop and became its first president. Chang also attempted to institute Henry James Society of Korea (한국헨리제임스학회) with Yoon Kihan in the 1980s. Yoon contacted Leon Edel, an authority on Henry James, at the University of Hawaii, Manoa in May 1984 and requested his assistance in the foundation of a Korean association concerning Henry James. However, Edel refused due to his advanced age, and Chang and Yoon's attempt could not be completed until a decade later. In 1993, The Henry James Society of Korea was finally established to facilitate discussions concerning the author. Chang actively interacted with American writers such as Pearl S. Buck, Henry Miller, and John Updike to discuss literary texts and provide advanced translations to audiences. He provided a textual book for literary students by translating and introducing Literary History of the United States (미국문학사) by Robert Ernest Spiller and An Introduction to English Literature (영문학사) by John Mulgan and Dan Davin to South Korea. Chang also wrote Migrating Birds on the Charles River (1984), a 360-page book comprising twelve short stories, three plays, and four essays in English.

== Works ==
=== Translation ===
Chang's landmark publications include classic texts such as Gone With the Wind by Margaret Mitchell and The Moon and Sixpence by William Somerset Maugham. However, he was most noted for his integral works on Pearl Buck. Chang translated more than twenty novels by her, popularizing her works among a wider readership. His works include Love and the Morning Calm, The Living Reed, The New Year, and The Good Earth. Chang's translative attempts were an effort to depict accurate form of the cultural inheritance and history as well as bring out the texts' full meaning. While Pearl Buck's works portray diverse and complex understanding of Korean history and culture, researched by the author herself, these elements were carefully crosschecked when Chang set to work on the translations. His such attempts to fully interact with the text includes his attempt to translate the title "The Living Reed" to "갈대는 바람에 시달려도 (The English translation of this title is closest to "The Reed May Suffer from the Wind")", of which bears Korean connotations on the word reed and the content of the novel. Chang also established a postcolonial approach toward modern English literature. Chang believed that providing translated versions of foreign literature to South Korean readers was crucial in expanding the nation's philosophical and theoretical knowledge. Chang insisted on an industrial change in the twentieth century Korea to establish both academic development and the proliferation of popular culture. He believed that transcripts of foreign novels must semantically hold both the essence of the target text and the natural tone of the readers' language. He delineates the process of translation to be closer to an interpretive rewriting rather than a mechanical substitution of words. By incisively noting the inherent disparity between the syntax and lexicon of English and Korean language, he proposed a moderate distancing from the strict replacement of words to better capture the essence of the text. His perspective influenced the modern translations and production of American literature. Chang conducted interviews with revered figures of literary history to procure detailed translations. Interactions with Pearl Buck, Henry Miller, and John Updike provided Korean readers with a brief insight into American ideology. Chang received the Modern Korean Literature Translation Award by The Korea Times with his translation of Trees on the Mountain Slopes, in 1970. and a Moran Medal for his endeavor in the academic field in 1989. He was awarded the Thornton Wilder Prize for his contribution to the translation of American literature in 1991.

== Relationship with Chang Young-hee ==
Chang Young-hee is the daughter of Chang Wang-rok and a professor, translator, and scholar of English literature. She collaborated with her father in translating English texts including The Good Earth, Gone With the Wind, and Scarlett. The Good Earth was published after Chang Wang-rok's death.

The elder Chang and the daughter is thought to have shared a close relationship both as comrades at work and as kindred family. Chang Wang-rok was the one who noticed her talent and aided her throughout her childhood to reach academic success. When her disability restricted her from taking the university admission tests, Chang Wang-rok attempted to persuade the presidents of universities to dismiss such social discriminations. Chang's contact with Jerome E. Breunig, the head of the English literature department at Sogang University, finally allowed her the opportunity that began her academic career. His concentrated interest in Pearl S. Buck is thought to have stemmed from his awareness of his daughter. Pearl S. Buck had a daughter diagnosed with phenylketonuria, and her novel To My Daughters, With Love contains her advices on women, inspired by her daughters and Helen Keller. Chang seems to have been influenced by such aspects of Pearl Buck's life and constantly interacted with her through interviews and letters. His works were in some part a reflection of his consideration for his daughter.

In 2004, she edited and published the book But Love Remains, a collection of articles and essays by Chang Wang-rok, as a tribute to his life.

== Publications ==
=== Selected translations (in chronological order) ===
Buck, Pearl S. The Hidden Flower (숨은 꽃, 1955)

Maugham, William Somerset. Of Human Bondage (인생의 굴레, 1957)

Anderson, Sherwood. Winesburg, Ohio (괴상한 사람들, 1959)

Buck, Pearl S. The Good Earth (대지, 1960)

Buck, Pearl S. The Living Reed (갈대는 바람에 시달려도, 1963)

Kim, Richard. The Martyred (순교자, 1964)

Wolfe, Thomas. You Can't Go Home Again (그대 다시는 고향에 못 가리, 1966)

Miller, Henry. Sexus (섹서스, 1969)

Buck, Pearl S. The Three Daughters of Madame Liang (양마담의 세딸, 1969)

Mulgan, John and Dan Davin. An Introduction to English Literature (영문학사, 1971)

Spiller, Robert E. Literary History of the United States (미국 문화사, 1973)

Mitchell, Margaret. Gone With the Wind (바람과 함께 사라지다, 1974)

Maugham, William Somerset. The Moon and Sixpence (달과 육펜스, 1976)

Wilde, Oscar. The Happy Prince (행복한 왕자, 1976)

Hemingway, Ernest. A Farewell to Arms (무기여 잘 있거라, 1980)

James, Henry. The Ambassadors (대사들, 1982)

Hawthorne, Nathaniel. The Scarlet Letter (1982)

=== Authored books ===
Turning Back Upon the Road (가던 길 멈추어 서서: 장왕록 에세이, 1989)

Migrating Birds on the Charles River (1984)
