= Chang Yong-hak =

South Korean writer (1921–1999)

- 장용학
- Born: 25 April 1921; Hamyeong Buk-do, korea
- Died: 31 August 1999 (aged 78); Seoul, South Korea
- Education: Waseda University
- Occupations: Writer; Educator
- Writing career
- Language: Korean language

Korean name
- Hangul: 장용학
- Hanja: 張龍鶴
- RR: Jang Yonghak
- MR: Chang Yonghak

Chang Yong-hak (Korean: 장용학; 25 April 1921 – 31 August 1999) was a South Korean writer.

== Biography ==
Chang was born in 1921 in Puryong County, North Hamgyong Province, Chōsen, Empire of Japan (now in North Korea). He graduated from Kyongsong High School in 1940. He studied at Waseda University in Japan (which he entered in 1942 as a business major), before being drafted into the Japanese army. After the end of World War Two, he was a teacher at Chongjin girl's middle school in North Korea but in 1947 he defected to South Korea and worked as a teacher at Hanyang industrial high school and Muhak girl's high school. In the early 1960s he worked as a professor at Deokseong women's university, but soon began to work in journalism, working as a commentator at the Dong-a Ilbo and Kyonghyang sinmun, writing fiction on the side.

== Works ==
While he worked as a teacher in Hanyang industrial high school. he wrote his first work "Yuksu (肉囚, The prisoned body)" in 1947 and published his work "Huihwa (희화, The funny painting)" on the Yonhap sinmun in 1949. The first work he got famous as an author was his short story, translated as "The Poems of John the Baptist" (available in English translation in Ten Korean Short Stories, edited by Ken O'Rouke, 1993), was a critical success in Korea.

== Literary style ==
Chang has been characterized as an idea novelist influenced by Sartre and philosophical ideas both Oriental and Occidental and as a writer of fantasy.
