= Park Sang-hyeok =

Korean association football player

Personal information
- Date of birth: 20 April 1998 (age 28)
- Place of birth: Seoul, South Korea
- Height: 1.68 m (5 ft 6 in)
- Position: Midfielder

Team information
- Current team: Seongnam FC
- Number: 21

Youth career
- –2010: Seoul Daedong Elementary School
- 2011–2013: Seoul Joongdong Middle School
- 2014–2016: Suwon Bluewings
- 2017–2018: Korea University

Senior career*
Years	Team	Apps	(Gls)
2019–2022	Suwon Samsung Bluewings	25	(1)
2021–2022	Gimcheon Sangmu (Army)	28	(3)
2023	Seongnam FC	25	(1)
2024	Suwon Samsung Bluewings	3	(0)
2025–	Seongnam FC	20	(1)

International career^{‡}
2012	South Korea U14	1	(0)
2015	South Korea U17	6	(0)
2016	South Korea U18	1	(0)
2016	South Korea U19	1	(0)
- * Club domestic league appearances and goals as of 6 August 2026 ‡ National team caps and goals as of 14:18, 10 December 2020 (UTC)

- Park Sang-hyeok
- Hangul: 박상혁
- Hanja: 朴相赫
- RR: Bak Sanghyeok
- MR: Pak Sanghyŏk

Park Sang-hyeok (Korean: 박상혁; born 20 April 1998) is a South Korean footballer currently playing as a midfielder for Seongnam FC.

== Career statistics ==
=== Club ===
As of 27 October 2024.

Club	Season	League			Cup		Continental		Other		Total	
Club	Season	Division	Apps	Goals	Apps	Goals	Apps	Goals	Apps	Goals	Apps	Goals
Suwon Samsung Bluewings	2019	K League 1	2	0	0	0	—		—		2	0
Suwon Samsung Bluewings	2020	K League 1	20	1	2 (Note: Appearances in the Korean FA Cup)	0	5 (Note: Appearances in the AFC Champions League)	1	—		27	2
Suwon Samsung Bluewings	2022	K League 1	3	1	—		—		0	0	27	2
Suwon Samsung Bluewings	Total		25	1	2	0	5	1	0	0	32	2
Gimcheon Sangmu (army)	2021	K League 2	15	2	1	0	—		—		16	2
Gimcheon Sangmu (army)	2022	K League 1	13	1	1	0	—		—		14	1
Gimcheon Sangmu (army)	Total		28	3	2	0	—		—		30	3
Seongnam FC	2023	K League 2	25	1	1	0	—		—		26	1
Suwon Samsung Bluewings	2024	K League 2	3	0	0	0	—		—		3	0
Career total			81	5	5	0	5	1	0	0	91	6
