= Jang Eun-jin =

South Korean writer (born 1976)

- Born: 1976 (age 49–50)
- Writing career
- Language: Korean

Korean name
- Hangul: 장은진
- RR: Jang Eunjin
- MR: Chang Ŭnjin

Jang Eun-Jin (Korean: 장은진; born 1976) is a female South Korean writer.

== Life ==
Jang Eun-Jin was born in 1976 in Gwangju City, Jeollanamdo, South Korea. She has a twin sister, Kim Hee-jin. Jang attended Cheonam National University in Gwangju from which she graduated with a degree in Geography. In 2004, Jang won the Jooggang Daily New Writers Award for her debut titled Kitchen Laboratory, which was eventually published as a book in 2008.

== Work ==
Jang has published four novels and a collection of short stories and has won three literary prizes in total The Chonnam Ilbo New Short Story Award in 2002, the Joongang Ilbo New Writers Contest in 2004, and the 14th annual Munhakdongne Award in 2009.

Jang has had one book translated into English, No One Writes Back (Translated by Jung Yewon), which The Guardian reviewed as, “An extraordinarily rich and moving novel about a young man's journey through South Korea with his dog”.

== Selected works ==
=== Works in translation ===
- No One Writes Back

=== Works in Korean (partial) ===
- 날짜없음
- 빈집을 두드리다
- 그녀의 집은 어디인가 (Where is that Woman's House?)
- 아무도 편지하지 않다 (No One Writes Back)
- 앨리스의 생활 방식 (How Alice Lives)
- 키친 실험실 (Kitchen Laboratories: Short Stories)

== Awards ==
- The Chonnam Ilbo New Short Story Award in 2002
- Joongang Ilbo New Writers Contest in 2004
- 14th annual Munhakdongne Award in 2009
