= He Xin (footballer) =

Chinese association football player

He Xin 和鑫
Personal information
- Date of birth: 18 April 1999 (age 27)
- Place of birth: Lijiang, Yunnan
- Height: 1.79 m (5 ft 10 in)
- Position: Midfielder

Youth career
- –2015: Shaoxing Keqiao Yuejia
- 2018–2020: Guangzhou Evergrande

Senior career*
Years	Team	Apps	(Gls)
2020–2022	Chengdu Rongcheng	27	(1)
2022	→ Shaanxi Chang'an Athletic (loan)	27	(0)
2023	Yunnan Yukun	6	(0)
- * Club domestic league appearances and goals as of 14:01, 8 January 2023 (UTC)

He Xin (Chinese: 和鑫; pinyin: Hé Xīn; born 18 April 1999) is a Chinese footballer currently playing as a midfielder.

== Club career ==
He Xin would play for the Guangzhou youth team before joining second tier football club Chengdu Rongcheng on 10 September 2020. He would go on to make his debut for the club in a league game on 12 September 2020 against Beijing Renhe, which ended in a 3-2 victory. The following season he would establish himself as a vital member within the team and aid them to promotion to the top tier at the end of the 2021 league campaign.

== Career statistics ==
As of 8 January 2023.

Club	Season	League			Cup		Continental		Other		Total	
Club	Season	Division	Apps	Goals	Apps	Goals	Apps	Goals	Apps	Goals	Apps	Goals
Chengdu Rongcheng	2020	China League One	4	0	0	0	–		–		4	0
Chengdu Rongcheng	2021	China League One	23	1	2	0	–		0 (Note: Appearance(s) in CSL Relegation play-offs)	0	25	1
Chengdu Rongcheng	Total		27	1	2	0	0	0	0	0	29	1
Shaanxi Chang'an Athletic (loan)	2022	China League One	27	0	1	0	–		–		28	0
Career total			54	1	3	0	0	0	0	0	57	1
